= 1985 Galician regional election =

Election in the Spanish region of Galicia

- 24 November 1985

All 71 seats in the Parliament of Galicia 36 seats needed for a majority
- Opinion polls
- Registered: 2,226,449 ▲2.4%
- Turnout: 1,277,897 (57.4%) ▲11.1 pp
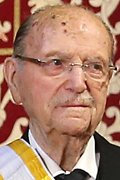

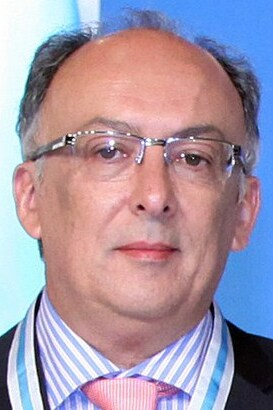

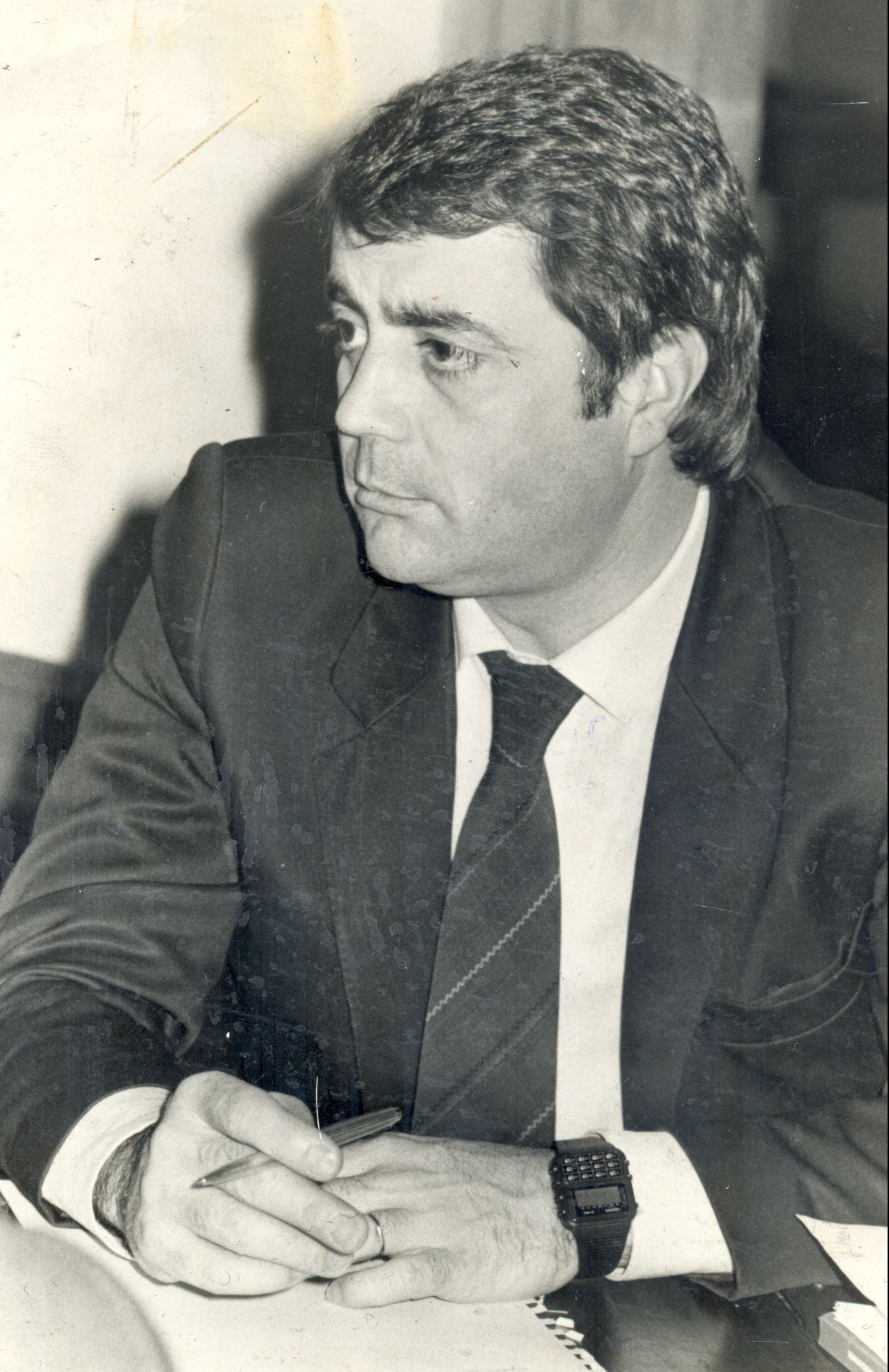

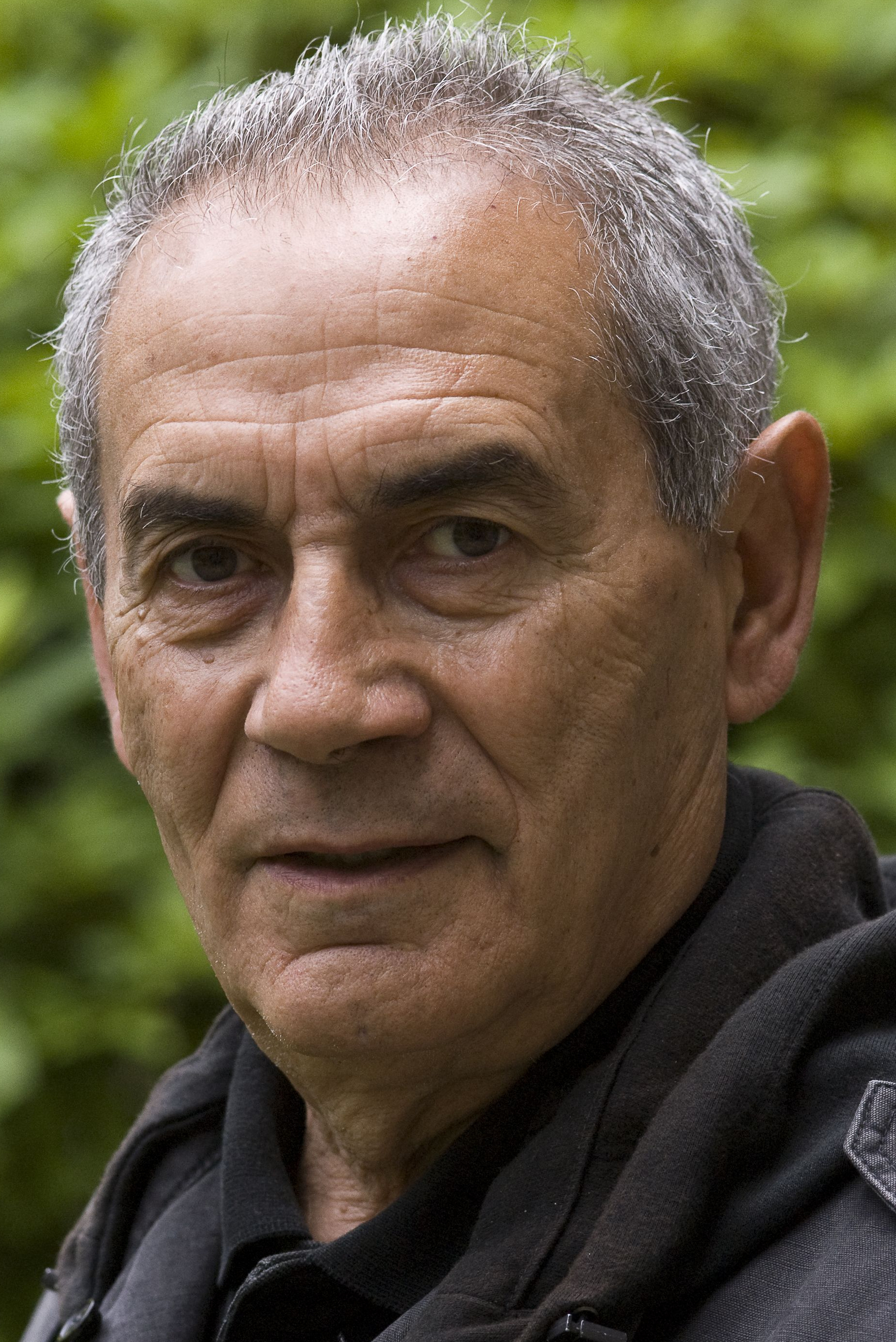

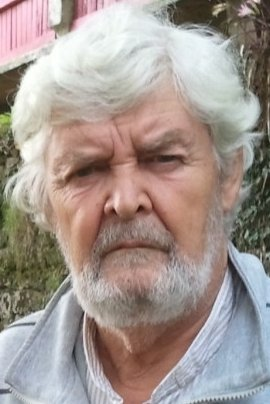
	First party	Second party	Third party
Leader	Gerardo Fernández Albor	Fernando González Laxe	Pablo González Mariñas
Party	AP–PDP–PL–CdG	PSdG–PSOE	CG
Leader since	1981	19 June 1985	23 July 1985
Leader's seat	La Coruña	La Coruña	La Coruña
Last election	26 seats, 30.5% (Note: Results for AP in the 1981 election.)	16 seats, 19.6%	Did not contest
Seats won	34	22	11
Seat change	▲8	▲6	▲11
Popular vote	516,218	361,946	163,425
Percentage	40.9%	28.7%	12.9%
Swing	▲10.4 pp	▲9.1 pp	New party
	Fourth party	Fifth party
Leader	Camilo Nogueira	Xosé Manuel Beiras
Party	PSG–EG	BNG
Leader since	1980	1982
Leader's seat	Pontevedra	La Coruña
Last election	1 seat, 3.4% (Note: Results for EG in the 1981 election.)	3 seats, 6.3% (Note: Results for BNPG–PSG in the 1981 election.)
Seats won	3	1
Seat change	▲2	▼2
Popular vote	71,599	53,072
Percentage	5.7%	4.2%
Swing	▲2.3 pp	▼2.1 pp
- Constituency results map for the Parliament of Galicia
President before election
Gerardo Fernández Albor
AP–PDP–PL–CdG
President after election
Gerardo Fernández Albor
AP–PDP–PL–CdG

A regional election was held in Galicia on 24 November 1985 to elect the 2nd Parliament of the autonomous community. All 71 seats in the Parliament were up for election.

== Overview ==
Under the 1981 Statute of Autonomy, the Parliament of Galicia was the unicameral legislature of the homonymous autonomous community, having legislative power in devolved matters, as well as the ability to grant or withdraw confidence from a regional president. The electoral and procedural rules were supplemented by national law provisions.

=== Date ===
The term of the Parliament of Galicia expired four years after the date of its previous election. The election decree was required to be issued no later than 25 days before the scheduled expiration date of parliament and published on the following day in the Official Journal of Galicia (DOG), with election day taking place between 54 and 60 days after the decree's publication. The previous election was held on 20 October 1981, which meant that the legislature's term would have expired on 20 October 1985. The election decree was required to be published in the DOG no later than 26 September 1985, setting the latest possible date for election day on 25 November 1985.

The Parliament of Galicia could not be dissolved before the expiration date of parliament, except in the event of an investiture process failing to elect a regional president within a two-month period from the first ballot. In such a case, the Parliament was to be automatically dissolved and a snap election called.

The election to the Parliament of Galicia was officially called on 26 September 1985 with the publication of the corresponding decree in the DOG, setting election day for 24 November and scheduling for the chamber to reconvene on 17 December.

=== Electoral system ===
Voting for the Parliament was based on universal suffrage, comprising all Spanish nationals over 18 years of age, registered in Galicia and with full political rights, provided that they had not been deprived of the right to vote by a final sentence, nor were legally incapacitated.

The Parliament of Galicia had a minimum of 60 and a maximum of 80 seats, with electoral provisions fixing its size at 71. All were elected in four multi-member constituencies—corresponding to the provinces of A Coruña, Lugo, Ourense and Pontevedra, each of which was assigned a fixed number of seats—using the D'Hondt method and closed-list proportional voting, with a three percent-threshold of valid votes (including blank ballots) in each constituency. The use of this electoral method resulted in a higher effective threshold depending on district magnitude and vote distribution.

As a result of the aforementioned allocation, each Parliament constituency was entitled the following seats:

Seats	Constituencies
22	La Coruña
19	Pontevedra
15	Lugo, Orense

The law did not provide for by-elections to fill vacant seats; instead, any vacancies arising after the proclamation of candidates and during the legislative term were filled by the next candidates on the party lists or, when required, by designated substitutes.

=== Outgoing parliament ===
The table below shows the composition of the parliamentary groups in the chamber at the time of dissolution.

Parliamentary composition in September 1985
Groups	Parties	Legislators	
Groups	Parties	Seats	Total
People's Alliance of Galicia Parliamentary Group	AP	26	26
Socialists of Galicia's Parliamentary Group	PSdG–PSOE	16	16
Galician Coalition Parliamentary Group	CG	10	10
Independents' Parliamentary Group	PDP	1	8
Independents' Parliamentary Group	INDEP	7	8
Centrist of Galicia Parliamentary Group	CdG	5	5
Mixed Parliamentary Group	UPG	2	5
Mixed Parliamentary Group	PSG–EG	2	5
Mixed Parliamentary Group	PCE–PCG	1	5

== Opinion polls ==
The tables below list opinion polling results in reverse chronological order, showing the most recent first and using the dates when the survey fieldwork was done, as opposed to the date of publication. Where the fieldwork dates are unknown, the date of publication is given instead. The highest percentage figure in each polling survey is displayed with its background shaded in the leading party's colour. If a tie ensues, this is applied to the figures with the highest percentages. The "Lead" column on the right shows the percentage-point difference between the parties with the highest percentages in a poll.

=== Voting intention estimates ===
The table below lists weighted voting intention estimates. Refusals are generally excluded from the party vote percentages, while question wording and the treatment of "don't know" responses and those not intending to vote may vary between polling organisations. When available, seat projections determined by the polling organisations are displayed below (or in place of) the percentages in a smaller font; 36 seats were required for an absolute majority in the Parliament of Galicia.

Polling firm/Commissioner	Fieldwork date	Sample size	Turnout	AP	UCD	PSdG–PSOE	BNG	PSG–EG	PCG	CDS	AP–PDP–PL–CdG	CG	Lead
1985 regional election	24 Nov 1985	—N/a	57.4	(Note: Within CP.)	–	28.7; 22	4.2; 1	5.7; 3	0.8; 0	3.3; 0	40.9; 34	12.9; 11	12.2
Alef/El País	13–14 Nov 1985	1,200	?		–	30.6; 23/25	6.1; 2/3	4.9; 2	1.0; 0	7.5; 4	40.0; 32/34	8.1; 5/6	9.4
Aresco/ABC	4–8 Nov 1985	1,050	?		–	28.8; 21/25	4.2; 0/2	4.9; 0/3	2.0; 0	6.6; 2/5	41.3; 35/40	7.1; 3/7	12.5
Alef/El País	23–25 Oct 1985	1,000	64.7		–	31.9; 23/27	6.0; 3	–	2.0; 2	7.3; 3/4	40.0; 32/36	7.3; 4/5	8.1
Sofemasa/CEOE	24 Jun–7 Jul 1985	1,865	?		–	31.9; 27	2.9; 0	3.5; 2	1.0; 0	3.5; 1	45.1; 38	5.9; 3	13.2
Typol/AP	18 Sep–9 Oct 1984	2,003	65.5		–	33.5; 26/28	6.2; 1/3	3.5; 1/2	2.7; 0	3.7; 1	38.9; 30/34	9.2; 6/8	5.4
1982 general election	28 Oct 1982	—N/a	63.7	37.6 (31)	17.7 (15)	32.8 (25)	3.0 (0)	1.7 (Note: Results for EG.) (0)	1.5 (0)	2.6 (0)	–	–	4.8
1981 regional election	20 Oct 1981	—N/a	46.3	30.5; 26	27.8; 24	19.6; 16	6.3; 3	3.4; 1	2.9; 1	–	–	–	2.7

== Results ==
=== Overall ===
← Summary of the 24 November 1985 Parliament of Galicia election results →
Parties and alliances	Popular vote			Seats	
Parties and alliances	Votes	%	±pp	Total	+/−
People's Coalition (AP–PDP–PL–CdG)^{1}	516,218	40.89	+10.37	34	+8
Socialists' Party of Galicia (PSdG–PSOE)	361,946	28.67	+9.05	22	+6
Galician Coalition (CG)	163,425	12.94	New	11	+11
Galician Socialist Party–Galician Left (PSG–EG)^{2}	71,599	5.67	+2.27	3	+2
Galician Nationalist Bloc (BNG)^{3}	53,072	4.20	−2.07	1	−2
Democratic and Social Centre (CDS)	41,411	3.28	New	0	±0
Communist Party of Galicia (PCE–PCG)	10,625	0.84	−2.09	0	−1
Workers' Socialist Party (PST)	9,689	0.77	−1.08	0	±0
Communist Party of Galicia (Revolutionary Marxist) (PCG (m–r))	8,318	0.66	New	0	±0
Humanist Platform (PH)	7,280	0.58	New	0	±0
Galician Party of the Country (PGC)	3,172	0.25	New	0	±0
Spanish Phalanx of the CNSO (FE–JONS)	2,922	0.23	+0.08	0	±0
Communist Party of Spain (Marxist–Leninist) (PCE (m–l))	1,554	0.12	±0.00	0	±0
Galician Socialist Unity (USG)	1,379	0.11	−1.18	0	±0
Communist Movement of Galicia (MCG)	1,327	0.11	−0.38	0	±0
Union of the Democratic Centre (UCD)	n/a	n/a	−27.80	0	−24
Blank ballots	8,627	0.68	+0.68		
Total	1,262,564			71	±0
Valid votes	1,262,564	98.80	+0.79		
Invalid votes	15,333	1.20	−0.79		
Votes cast / turnout	1,277,897	57.40	+11.12		
Abstentions	948,552	42.60	−11.12		
Registered voters	2,226,449				
Sources
Footnotes: ^{1} People's Coalition results are compared to People's Alliance totals in the 1981 election.; ^{2} Galician Socialist Party–Galician Left results are compared to Galician Left totals in the 1981 election.; ^{3} Galician Nationalist Bloc results are compared to Galician National-Popular Bloc–Galician Socialist Party totals in the 1981 election.

Popular vote
CP	40.89%
PSdG–PSOE	28.67%
CG	12.94%
PSG–EG	5.67%
BNG	4.20%
CDS	3.28%
Others	3.66%
Blank ballots	0.68%

Seats
CP	47.89%
PSdG–PSOE	30.99%
CG	15.49%
PSG–EG	4.23%
BNG	1.41%

=== Distribution by constituency ===
Constituency	CP		PSdG		CG		PSG–EG		BNG	
Constituency	%	S	%	S	%	S	%	S	%	S
La Coruña	38.0	10	32.3	8	9.9	2	5.7	1	5.2	1
Lugo	44.9	8	24.4	4	20.4	3	2.0	–	3.3	–
Orense	40.1	7	25.7	4	22.8	4	3.0	–	3.0	–
Pontevedra	43.0	9	27.4	6	8.9	2	8.6	2	3.9	–
Total	40.9	34	28.7	22	12.9	11	5.7	3	4.2	1

== Aftermath ==
=== Government formation ===
Investiture; Nomination of Gerardo Fernández Albor (AP)
Ballot →	16 January 1986	17 January 1986
Required majority →	36 out of 71	Simple
Yes: • AP–PDP–PL–CdG (34)	34 / 71	34 / 71
No: • PSdG (22); • CG (11); • PSG–EG (3); • BNG (1)	37 / 71	37 / 71
Abstentions	0 / 71	0 / 71
Absentees	0 / 71	0 / 71

Investiture; Nomination of Gerardo Fernández Albor (AP)
Ballot →	20 February 1986	21 February 1986
Required majority →	36 out of 71	Simple
Yes: • AP–PDP–PL–CdG (34) (33 on 20 Feb)	33 / 71	34 / 71
No: • PSdG (22); • PSG–EG (3); • BNG (1)	26 / 71	26 / 71
Abstentions: • CG (11) (10 on 20 Feb)	10 / 71	11 / 71
Absentees: • AP–PDP–PL–CdG (1) (on 20 Feb); • CG (1) (on 20 Feb)	2 / 71	0 / 71

=== 1987 motion of no confidence ===
Motion of no confidence Nomination of Fernando González Laxe (PSdG)
Ballot →	23 September 1987
Required majority →	36 out of 71
Yes: • PSdG (22); • CG–UDG (10); • PNG (5); • PSG–EG (3)	40 / 71
No: • AP–PDP–PL–CdG (29)	29 / 71
Abstentions: • AP–PDP–PL–CdG (1); • BNG (1)	2 / 71
Absentees	0 / 71

== Bibliography ==
- Ley Orgánica 1/1981, de 6 de abril, de Estatuto de Autonomía para Galicia (Organic Law 1/1981). Official State Gazette (in Spanish). 6 April 1981 [version as of 28 April 1981]. BOE-A-1981-9564.
- Ley 1/1983, de 22 de febrero, reguladora de la Junta y su Presidente (Law 1/1983). Official State Gazette (in Spanish). 22 February 1983 [version as of 21 March 1983]. BOE-A-1983-23788.
- Ley Orgánica 5/1985, de 19 de junio, del Régimen Electoral General (Organic Law 5/1985). Official State Gazette (in Spanish). 19 June 1985 [version as of 20 June 1985]. BOE-A-1985-11672.
- Ley 8/1985, de 13 de agosto, de elecciones al Parlamento de Galicia (Law 8/1985). Official State Gazette (in Spanish). 13 August 1985 [version as of 16 August 1985]. BOE-A-1985-21380.
- Decreto 194/1985, do 25 de setembro, polo que se convocan eleccións ó Parlamento de Galicia (PDF) (Decree 194/1985). Official Journal of Galicia (in Galician). 25 September 1985.
