= 1987 Spanish local elections in Galicia =

This article presents the results breakdown of the local elections held in Galicia on 10 June 1987. The following tables show detailed results in the autonomous community's most populous municipalities, sorted alphabetically.

== City control ==
The following table lists party control in the most populous municipalities, including provincial capitals (highlighted in bold). Gains for a party are highlighted in that party's colour.

| Municipality | Population | Previous control | New control |
|---|---|---|---|
| **A Coruña** | 239,150 | Socialists' Party of Galicia (PSdG–PSOE) | Socialists' Party of Galicia (PSdG–PSOE) |
| Ferrol | 86,154 | Socialists' Party of Galicia (PSdG–PSOE) | People's Alliance (AP) (PSdG–PSOE in 1989) |
| **Lugo** | 75,623 | Galician Progressive Coalition (PDP–PL–CG) | Galician Progressive Coalition (PDP–PL–CG) |
| **Ourense** | 100,143 | People's Alliance (AP) | People's Alliance (AP) (PSdG–PSOE in 1987; IG in 1990) |
| **Pontevedra** | 67,289 | Independents of Galicia (IG) | Independents of Galicia (IG) |
| Santiago de Compostela | 86,250 | People's Alliance (AP) | Socialists' Party of Galicia (PSdG–PSOE) |
| Vigo | 261,878 | Socialists' Party of Galicia (PSdG–PSOE) | Socialists' Party of Galicia (PSdG–PSOE) |

== Municipalities ==
=== A Coruña ===
Population: 239,150

← Summary of the 10 June 1987 City Council of A Coruña election results →
| Parties and alliances | Popular vote | | | Seats | |
| Parties and alliances | Votes | % | ±pp | Total | +/− |
|---|---|---|---|---|---|
| Socialists' Party of Galicia (PSdG–PSOE) | 55,900 | 50.97 | +7.32 | 17 | +3 |
| People's Alliance (AP)^{1} | 27,094 | 24.70 | −1.23 | 8 | ±0 |
| Democratic and Social Centre (CDS) | 7,967 | 7.26 | +5.76 | 2 | +2 |
| Galician Progressive Coalition (PDP–PL–CG)^{2} | 5,096 | 4.65 | +4.10 | 0 | ±0 |
| Galician Socialist Party–Galician Left (PSG–EG)^{3} | 4,026 | 3.67 | +0.22 | 0 | ±0 |
| Galician Nationalist Bloc (BNG) | 2,700 | 2.46 | +0.54 | 0 | ±0 |
| United Left (EU–IU)^{4} | 2,422 | 2.21 | −0.40 | 0 | ±0 |
| Corunnan Union (UC) | 1,520 | 1.39 | New | 0 | ±0 |
| Galician Nationalist Party (PNG) | 512 | 0.47 | New | 0 | ±0 |
| Workers' Socialist Party (PST) | 492 | 0.45 | −0.28 | 0 | ±0 |
| Workers' Party of Galicia–Communist Unity (PTG–UC) | 400 | 0.36 | New | 0 | ±0 |
| Humanist Platform (PH) | 241 | 0.22 | New | 0 | ±0 |
| United La Coruña (LCU) | n/a | n/a | −16.03 | 0 | −5 |
| Blank ballots | 1,309 | 1.19 | +1.19 | | |
| Total | 109,679 | | | 27 | ±0 |
| Valid votes | 109,679 | 98.60 | −1.40 | | |
| Invalid votes | 1,552 | 1.40 | +1.40 | | |
| Votes cast / turnout | 111,231 | 58.97 | +0.31 | | |
| Abstentions | 77,396 | 41.03 | −0.31 | | |
| Registered voters | 188,627 | | | | |
Sources
Footnotes: ^{1} People's Alliance results are compared to People's Coalition totals in the 1983 election.; ^{2} Galician Progressive Coalition results are compared to Galicianist Party–Convergence of Independents of Galicia totals in the 1983 election.; ^{3} Galician Socialist Party–Galician Left results are compared to the combined totals of Galician Left and Galician Socialist Party in the 1983 election.; ^{4} United Left results are compared to Communist Party of Galicia totals in the 1983 election.

=== Ferrol ===
Population: 86,154

← Summary of the 10 June 1987 City Council of Ferrol election results →
| Parties and alliances | Popular vote | | | Seats | |
| Parties and alliances | Votes | % | ±pp | Total | +/− |
|---|---|---|---|---|---|
| People's Alliance (AP)^{1} | 11,911 | 30.93 | −5.82 | 10 | ±0 |
| Socialists' Party of Galicia (PSdG–PSOE) | 8,037 | 20.87 | −17.18 | 6 | −5 |
| United Left (EU–IU)^{2} | 5,882 | 15.27 | +1.67 | 5 | +1 |
| Democratic and Social Centre (CDS) | 5,360 | 13.92 | +10.32 | 4 | +4 |
| Galician Nationalist Bloc (BNG) | 1,808 | 4.69 | +1.37 | 0 | ±0 |
| Workers' Party of Galicia–Communist Unity (PTG–UC) | 1,658 | 4.31 | New | 0 | ±0 |
| Galician Socialist Party–Galician Left (PSG–EG)^{3} | 1,532 | 3.98 | −0.70 | 0 | ±0 |
| Galician Progressive Coalition (PDP–PL–CG) | 1,455 | 3.78 | New | 0 | ±0 |
| Galician Nationalist Party (PNG) | 276 | 0.72 | New | 0 | ±0 |
| Humanist Platform (PH) | 165 | 0.43 | New | 0 | ±0 |
| Blank ballots | 429 | 1.11 | +1.11 | | |
| Total | 38,513 | | | 25 | ±0 |
| Valid votes | 38,513 | 98.86 | −1.14 | | |
| Invalid votes | 445 | 1.14 | +1.14 | | |
| Votes cast / turnout | 38,958 | 58.93 | +2.97 | | |
| Abstentions | 27,151 | 41.07 | −2.97 | | |
| Registered voters | 66,109 | | | | |
Sources
Footnotes: ^{1} People's Alliance results are compared to People's Coalition totals in the 1983 election.; ^{2} United Left results are compared to Communist Party of Galicia totals in the 1983 election.; ^{3} Galician Socialist Party–Galician Left results are compared to the combined totals of Galician Socialist Party and Galician Left in the 1983 election.

=== Lugo ===
Population: 75,623

← Summary of the 10 June 1987 City Council of Lugo election results →
| Parties and alliances | Popular vote | | | Seats | |
| Parties and alliances | Votes | % | ±pp | Total | +/− |
|---|---|---|---|---|---|
| People's Alliance (AP)^{1} | 10,937 | 28.69 | −9.15 | 9 | −2 |
| Galician Progressive Coalition (PDP–PL–CG)^{2} | 10,650 | 27.93 | +12.24 | 9 | +5 |
| Socialists' Party of Galicia (PSdG–PSOE) | 7,978 | 20.92 | −9.69 | 6 | −2 |
| Democratic and Social Centre (CDS) | 2,070 | 5.43 | +3.84 | 1 | +1 |
| Nationalist Galicianist Party (PGN) | 1,282 | 3.36 | New | 0 | ±0 |
| Galician Nationalist Party (PNG) | 1,134 | 2.97 | New | 0 | ±0 |
| Galician Nationalist Bloc (BNG) | 1,116 | 2.93 | +0.54 | 0 | ±0 |
| Workers' Party of Galicia–Communist Unity (PTG–UC) | 860 | 2.26 | New | 0 | ±0 |
| Galician Socialist Party–Galician Left (PSG–EG)^{3} | 756 | 1.98 | +1.05 | 0 | ±0 |
| United Left (EU–IU)^{4} | 605 | 1.59 | −2.33 | 0 | ±0 |
| Ecologist Alternative of Galicia (AEG) | 321 | 0.84 | New | 0 | ±0 |
| Humanist Platform (PH) | 49 | 0.13 | New | 0 | ±0 |
| Independents (INDEP) | n/a | n/a | −7.04 | 0 | −2 |
| Blank ballots | 369 | 0.97 | +0.97 | | |
| Total | 38,127 | | | 25 | ±0 |
| Valid votes | 38,127 | 98.66 | −1.34 | | |
| Invalid votes | 518 | 1.34 | +1.34 | | |
| Votes cast / turnout | 38,645 | 62.62 | +3.18 | | |
| Abstentions | 23,069 | 37.38 | −3.18 | | |
| Registered voters | 61,714 | | | | |
Sources
Footnotes: ^{1} People's Alliance results are compared to People's Coalition totals in the 1983 election.; ^{2} Galician Progressive Coalition results are compared to Galicianist Party–Convergence of Independents of Galicia totals in the 1983 election.; ^{3} Galician Socialist Party–Galician Left results are compared to Galician Left totals in the 1983 election.; ^{4} United Left results are compared to Communist Party of Galicia totals in the 1983 election.

=== Ourense ===
Population: 100,143

← Summary of the 10 June 1987 City Council of Ourense election results →
| Parties and alliances | Popular vote | | | Seats | |
| Parties and alliances | Votes | % | ±pp | Total | +/− |
|---|---|---|---|---|---|
| People's Alliance–Centrists of Galicia (AP–CdG)^{1} | 15,192 | 33.46 | −4.43 | 11 | ±0 |
| Socialists' Party of Galicia (PSdG–PSOE) | 13,273 | 29.23 | −5.62 | 10 | ±0 |
| Independents of Galicia (IG) | 4,351 | 9.58 | New | 3 | +3 |
| Democratic and Social Centre (CDS) | 4,047 | 8.91 | +7.28 | 3 | +3 |
| United Left (EU–IU)^{2} | 1,565 | 3.45 | +0.39 | 0 | ±0 |
| Galician Socialist Party–Galician Left (PSG–EG)^{3} | 1,350 | 2.97 | +0.44 | 0 | ±0 |
| Independent Solution (SI) | 1,237 | 2.72 | New | 0 | ±0 |
| Galician Nationalist Bloc (BNG) | 1,234 | 2.72 | −0.73 | 0 | ±0 |
| Galician Progressive Coalition (PDP–PL–CG)^{4} | 1,176 | 2.59 | −14.01 | 0 | −4 |
| Group of Independents of Orense (AdeI–O) | 1,093 | 2.41 | New | 0 | ±0 |
| Humanist Platform (PH) | 109 | 0.24 | New | 0 | ±0 |
| Galician Nationalist Party (PNG) | 105 | 0.23 | New | 0 | ±0 |
| Workers' Party of Galicia–Communist Unity (PTG–UC) | 85 | 0.19 | New | 0 | ±0 |
| Spanish Phalanx of the CNSO (FE–JONS) | 67 | 0.15 | New | 0 | ±0 |
| Blank ballots | 521 | 1.15 | +1.15 | | |
| Total | 45,405 | | | 27 | +2 |
| Valid votes | 45,405 | 98.63 | −1.37 | | |
| Invalid votes | 632 | 1.37 | +1.37 | | |
| Votes cast / turnout | 46,037 | 54.48 | +1.53 | | |
| Abstentions | 38,472 | 45.52 | −1.53 | | |
| Registered voters | 84,509 | | | | |
Sources
Footnotes: ^{1} People's Alliance–Centrists of Galicia results are compared to People's Coalition totals in the 1983 election.; ^{2} United Left results are compared to Communist Party of Galicia totals in the 1983 election.; ^{3} Galician Socialist Party–Galician Left results are compared to the combined totals of Galician Socialist Party and Galician Left in the 1983 election.; ^{4} Galician Progressive Coalition results are compared to Galicianist Party–Centrists of Ourense totals in the 1983 election.

=== Pontevedra ===
Population: 67,289

← Summary of the 10 June 1987 City Council of Pontevedra election results →
| Parties and alliances | Popular vote | | | Seats | |
| Parties and alliances | Votes | % | ±pp | Total | +/− |
|---|---|---|---|---|---|
| Independents of Galicia (IG) | 10,439 | 33.37 | New | 10 | +10 |
| Socialists' Party of Galicia (PSdG–PSOE) | 7,151 | 22.86 | −3.59 | 6 | −2 |
| People's Alliance (AP)^{1} | 6,422 | 20.53 | −36.37 | 6 | −11 |
| Democratic and Social Centre (CDS) | 2,490 | 7.96 | +5.84 | 2 | +2 |
| Galician Nationalist Bloc (BNG) | 1,594 | 5.10 | +1.98 | 1 | +1 |
| Galician Socialist Party–Galician Left (PSG–EG)^{2} | 1,259 | 4.02 | +0.16 | 0 | ±0 |
| Galician Nationalist Party (PNG) | 627 | 2.00 | New | 0 | ±0 |
| Rural Unity (UR) | 537 | 1.72 | New | 0 | ±0 |
| United Left (EU–IU)^{3} | 222 | 0.71 | −1.57 | 0 | ±0 |
| Humanist Platform (PH) | 92 | 0.29 | New | 0 | ±0 |
| Nationalist Galicianist Party (PGN) | 91 | 0.29 | New | 0 | ±0 |
| Workers' Party of Galicia–Communist Unity (PTG–UC) | 75 | 0.24 | New | 0 | ±0 |
| Blank ballots | 281 | 0.90 | +0.90 | | |
| Total | 31,280 | | | 25 | ±0 |
| Valid votes | 31,280 | 99.19 | −0.81 | | |
| Invalid votes | 256 | 0.81 | +0.81 | | |
| Votes cast / turnout | 31,536 | 65.20 | +8.71 | | |
| Abstentions | 16,835 | 34.80 | −8.71 | | |
| Registered voters | 48,371 | | | | |
Sources
Footnotes: ^{1} People's Alliance–Centrists of Galicia results are compared to People's Coalition totals in the 1983 election.; ^{2} Galician Socialist Party–Galician Left results are compared to the combined totals of Galician Left and Galician Socialist Party in the 1983 election.; ^{3} United Left results are compared to Communist Party of Galicia totals in the 1983 election.

=== Santiago de Compostela ===
Population: 86,250

← Summary of the 10 June 1987 City Council of Santiago de Compostela election results →
| Parties and alliances | Popular vote | | | Seats | |
| Parties and alliances | Votes | % | ±pp | Total | +/− |
|---|---|---|---|---|---|
| Socialists' Party of Galicia (PSdG–PSOE) | 14,887 | 39.27 | +8.03 | 13 | +3 |
| People's Alliance (AP)^{1} | 11,644 | 30.72 | −5.98 | 10 | −1 |
| Democratic and Social Centre (CDS) | 2,998 | 7.91 | +5.79 | 2 | +2 |
| Galician Socialist Party–Galician Left (PSG–EG)^{2} | 1,720 | 4.54 | −0.11 | 0 | ±0 |
| Galician Nationalist Bloc (BNG) | 1,364 | 3.60 | +1.09 | 0 | ±0 |
| Galician Progressive Coalition (PDP–PL–CG) | 1,283 | 3.38 | New | 0 | ±0 |
| Nationalist Galicianist Party (PGN) | 909 | 2.40 | New | 0 | ±0 |
| United Left (EU–IU)^{3} | 844 | 2.23 | −2.91 | 0 | −1 |
| Independents of Galicia (IG) | 842 | 2.22 | New | 0 | ±0 |
| Galician Nationalist Party (PNG) | 655 | 1.73 | New | 0 | ±0 |
| Workers' Party of Galicia–Communist Unity (PTG–UC) | 209 | 0.55 | New | 0 | ±0 |
| Republican Popular Unity (UPR) | 107 | 0.28 | New | 0 | ±0 |
| Humanist Platform (PH) | 66 | 0.17 | New | 0 | ±0 |
| Liberal Democratic Party (PDL) | n/a | n/a | −10.67 | 0 | −3 |
| Blank ballots | 379 | 1.00 | +1.00 | | |
| Total | 37,907 | | | 25 | ±0 |
| Valid votes | 37,907 | 98.80 | −1.20 | | |
| Invalid votes | 459 | 1.20 | +1.20 | | |
| Votes cast / turnout | 38,366 | 60.58 | +8.99 | | |
| Abstentions | 24,963 | 39.42 | −8.99 | | |
| Registered voters | 63,329 | | | | |
Sources
Footnotes: ^{1} People's Alliance–Centrists of Galicia results are compared to People's Coalition totals in the 1983 election.; ^{2} Galician Socialist Party–Galician Left results are compared to Galician Left totals in the 1983 election.; ^{3} United Left results are compared to Communist Party of Galicia totals in the 1983 election.

=== Vigo ===
Population: 261,878

← Summary of the 10 June 1987 City Council of Vigo election results →
| Parties and alliances | Popular vote | | | Seats | |
| Parties and alliances | Votes | % | ±pp | Total | +/− |
|---|---|---|---|---|---|
| Socialists' Party of Galicia (PSdG–PSOE) | 42,731 | 35.20 | −3.60 | 11 | −1 |
| People's Alliance (AP)^{1} | 37,035 | 30.51 | −3.05 | 9 | −2 |
| Galician Socialist Party–Galician Left (PSG–EG)^{2} | 20,232 | 16.67 | +12.19 | 5 | +5 |
| Democratic and Social Centre (CDS) | 10,618 | 8.75 | +6.74 | 2 | +2 |
| Galician Nationalist Bloc (BNG) | 2,250 | 1.85 | −0.02 | 0 | ±0 |
| Independent Democratic Vigo Group (AVDI) | 2,066 | 1.70 | New | 0 | ±0 |
| United Left (EU–IU)^{3} | 1,803 | 1.49 | −4.18 | 0 | −1 |
| Workers' Party of Galicia–Communist Unity (PTG–UC) | 1,594 | 1.31 | New | 0 | ±0 |
| Galician Progressive Coalition (PDP–PL–CG)^{4} | 1,070 | 0.88 | New | 0 | ±0 |
| Green Party of Galicia (PVG) | 527 | 0.43 | New | 0 | ±0 |
| Humanist Platform (PH) | 289 | 0.24 | New | 0 | ±0 |
| Spanish Phalanx of the CNSO (FE–JONS) | 175 | 0.14 | New | 0 | ±0 |
| Governing Independent Viguese (VIGO) | n/a | n/a | −9.90 | 0 | −3 |
| Blank ballots | 1,004 | 0.83 | +0.83 | | |
| Total | 121,394 | | | 27 | ±0 |
| Valid votes | 121,394 | 99.21 | −0.79 | | |
| Invalid votes | 964 | 0.79 | +0.79 | | |
| Votes cast / turnout | 122,358 | 64.73 | +8.07 | | |
| Abstentions | 66,660 | 35.27 | −8.07 | | |
| Registered voters | 189,018 | | | | |
Sources
Footnotes: ^{1} People's Alliance–Centrists of Galicia results are compared to People's Coalition totals in the 1983 election.; ^{2} Galician Socialist Party–Galician Left results are compared to Galician Left totals in the 1983 election.; ^{3} United Left results are compared to Communist Party of Galicia totals in the 1983 election.; ^{4} Galician Progressive Coalition results are compared to Galicianist Party totals in the 1983 election.
