= 1983 Spanish local elections in Galicia =

This article presents the results breakdown of the local elections held in Galicia on 8 May 1983. The following tables show detailed results in the autonomous community's most populous municipalities, sorted alphabetically.

== City control ==
The following table lists party control in the most populous municipalities, including provincial capitals (highlighted in bold). Gains for a party are highlighted in that party's colour.

Municipality	Population	Previous control	New control
El Ferrol del Caudillo	87,691	Socialists' Party of Galicia (PSdG–PSOE)	Socialists' Party of Galicia (PSdG–PSOE)
**La Coruña**	231,721	Union of the Democratic Centre (UCD)	Socialists' Party of Galicia (PSdG–PSOE)
**Lugo**	72,574	Union of the Democratic Centre (UCD)	People's Coalition (AP–PDP–UL) (CPG in 1987)
**Orense**	94,346	Union of the Democratic Centre (UCD)	People's Coalition (AP–PDP–UL)
**Pontevedra**	64,184	Union of the Democratic Centre (UCD)	People's Coalition (AP–PDP–UL) (IG in 1987)
Santiago de Compostela	82,404	Liberal Democratic Party (PDL)	Socialists' Party of Galicia (PSdG–PSOE) (AP in 1986)
Vigo	261,331	Socialists' Party of Galicia (PSdG–PSOE)	Socialists' Party of Galicia (PSdG–PSOE)

== Municipalities ==
=== El Ferrol del Caudillo ===
Population: 87,691

← Summary of the 8 May 1983 City Council of El Ferrol del Caudillo election results →
Parties and alliances	Popular vote			Seats	
Parties and alliances	Votes	%	±pp	Total	+/−
Socialists' Party of Galicia (PSdG–PSOE)	14,140	38.05	+10.79	11	+3
People's Coalition (AP–PDP–UL)^{1}	13,657	36.75	+27.06	10	+8
Communist Party of Galicia (PCE–PCG)	5,052	13.60	−5.37	4	−1
Democratic and Social Centre (CDS)	1,336	3.60	New	0	±0
Galician Nationalist Bloc (BNG)^{2}	1,233	3.32	−0.89	0	±0
Galician Socialist Party (PSG)	1,104	2.97	New	0	±0
Galician Left (EG)	636	1.71	New	0	±0
Union of the Democratic Centre (UCD)	n/a	n/a	−24.84	0	−7
Galician Unity (PG–POG–PSG)	n/a	n/a	−13.49	0	−3
Blank ballots	0	0.00	±0.00		
Total	37,158			25	±0
Valid votes	37,158	100.00	+0.94		
Invalid votes	0	0.00	−0.94		
Votes cast / turnout	37,158	55.96	+0.57		
Abstentions	29,246	44.04	−0.57		
Registered voters	66,404				
Sources
Footnotes: ^{1} People's Coalition results are compared to Democratic Coalition totals in the 1979 election.; ^{2} Galician Nationalist Bloc results are compared to Galician National-Popular Bloc totals in the 1979 election.

=== La Coruña ===
Population: 231,721

← Summary of the 8 May 1983 City Council of La Coruña election results →
Parties and alliances	Popular vote			Seats	
Parties and alliances	Votes	%	±pp	Total	+/−
Socialists' Party of Galicia (PSdG–PSOE)	43,595	43.65	+23.14	14	+8
People's Coalition (AP–PDP–UL)^{1}	25,898	25.93	+12.84	8	+4
United La Coruña (LCU)	16,007	16.03	New	5	+5
Communist Party of Galicia (PCE–PCG)	2,609	2.61	−6.14	0	−2
Galician Left (EG)	2,138	2.14	New	0	±0
Galician Nationalist Bloc (BNG)^{2}	1,913	1.92	−6.41	0	−2
Rainbow Electoral Group (AEA)	1,554	1.56	New	0	±0
Democratic and Social Centre (CDS)	1,498	1.50	New	0	±0
Galician Socialist Party (PSG)	1,312	1.31	New	0	±0
Independents (INDEP)	889	0.89	New	0	±0
Friends of La Coruña (AC)	823	0.82	New	0	±0
Workers' Socialist Party (PST)	731	0.73	New	0	±0
Galicianist Party–Convergence of Independents of Galicia (PG–CIGA)^{3}	552	0.55	−16.71	0	−5
Galician Ecologist Movement (MEG)	347	0.35	New	0	±0
Union of the Democratic Centre (UCD)	n/a	n/a	−28.05	0	−8
Blank ballots	0	0.00	±0.00		
Total	99,866			27	±0
Valid votes	99,866	100.00	+1.86		
Invalid votes	0	0.00	−1.86		
Votes cast / turnout	99,866	58.66	+5.12		
Abstentions	70,366	41.34	−5.12		
Registered voters	170,232				
Sources
Footnotes: ^{1} People's Coalition results are compared to Democratic Coalition totals in the 1979 election.; ^{2} Galician Nationalist Bloc results are compared to Galician National-Popular Bloc totals in the 1979 election.; ^{3} Galicianist Party–Convergence of Independents of Galicia results are compared to Galician Unity totals in the 1979 election.

=== Lugo ===
Population: 72,574

← Summary of the 8 May 1983 City Council of Lugo election results →
Parties and alliances	Popular vote			Seats	
Parties and alliances	Votes	%	±pp	Total	+/−
People's Coalition (AP–PDP–UL)^{1}	12,846	37.84	+22.86	11	+7
Socialists' Party of Galicia (PSdG–PSOE)	10,391	30.61	+17.04	8	+4
Galicianist Party–Convergence of Independents of Galicia (PG–CIGA)	5,325	15.69	New	4	+4
Independents (INDEP)	2,389	7.04	−7.46	2	−2
Communist Party of Galicia (PCE–PCG)	1,330	3.92	−0.99	0	±0
Galician Nationalist Bloc (BNG)^{2}	813	2.39	−4.82	0	−2
Democratic and Social Centre (CDS)	539	1.59	New	0	±0
Galician Left (EG)	316	0.93	New	0	±0
Union of the Democratic Centre (UCD)	n/a	n/a	−27.20	0	−8
Blank ballots	0	0.00	±0.00		
Total	33,949			25	±0
Valid votes	33,949	100.00	±0.00		
Invalid votes	0	0.00	±0.00		
Votes cast / turnout	33,949	59.44	+2.65		
Abstentions	23,161	40.56	−2.65		
Registered voters	57,110				
Sources
Footnotes: ^{1} People's Coalition results are compared to Democratic Coalition totals in the 1979 election.; ^{2} Galician Nationalist Bloc results are compared to Galician National-Popular Bloc totals in the 1979 election.

=== Orense ===
Population: 94,346

← Summary of the 8 May 1983 City Council of Orense election results →
Parties and alliances	Popular vote			Seats	
Parties and alliances	Votes	%	±pp	Total	+/−
People's Coalition (AP–PDP–UL)^{1}	14,821	37.89	+17.55	11	+6
Socialists' Party of Galicia (PSdG–PSOE)	13,633	34.85	+16.87	10	+5
Galicianist Party–Centrists of Orense (PG–CdO)	6,492	16.60	New	4	+4
Galician Nationalist Bloc (BNG)^{2}	1,348	3.45	−5.54	0	−2
Communist Party of Galicia (PCE–PCG)	1,196	3.06	−6.02	0	−2
Galician Socialist Party (PSG)	790	2.02	New	0	±0
Democratic and Social Centre (CDS)	636	1.63	New	0	±0
Galician Left (EG)	198	0.51	New	0	±0
Union of the Democratic Centre (UCD)	n/a	n/a	−32.22	0	−9
Independents (INDEP)	n/a	n/a	−6.86	0	−2
Blank ballots	0	0.00	±0.00		
Total	39,114			25	±0
Valid votes	39,114	100.00	+1.22		
Invalid votes	0	0.00	−1.22		
Votes cast / turnout	39,114	52.95	+1.83		
Abstentions	34,755	47.05	−1.83		
Registered voters	73,869				
Sources
Footnotes: ^{1} People's Coalition results are compared to Democratic Coalition totals in the 1979 election.; ^{2} Galician Nationalist Bloc results are compared to Galician National-Popular Bloc totals in the 1979 election.

=== Pontevedra ===
Population: 64,184

← Summary of the 8 May 1983 City Council of Pontevedra election results →
Parties and alliances	Popular vote			Seats	
Parties and alliances	Votes	%	±pp	Total	+/−
People's Coalition (AP–PDP–UL)^{1}	14,852	56.90	+50.87	17	+16
Socialists' Party of Galicia (PSdG–PSOE)	6,905	26.45	+14.64	8	+5
Galicianist Party (PG)^{2}	1,193	4.57	−17.86	0	−6
Galician Nationalist Bloc (BNG)^{3}	815	3.12	−2.46	0	−1
Communist Party of Galicia (PCE–PCG)	594	2.28	−3.15	0	−1
Galician Left (EG)	554	2.12	New	0	±0
Democratic and Social Centre (CDS)	554	2.12	New	0	±0
Galician Socialist Party (PSG)	453	1.74	New	0	±0
Pontevedran Unity (UP)	182	0.70	New	0	±0
Union of the Democratic Centre (UCD)	n/a	n/a	−32.00	0	−9
Independent Candidacy (CI)	n/a	n/a	−13.77	0	−4
Blank ballots	0	0.00	±0.00		
Total	26,102			25	±0
Valid votes	26,102	100.00	+1.29		
Invalid votes	0	0.00	−1.29		
Votes cast / turnout	26,102	56.49	+3.17		
Abstentions	20,102	43.51	−3.17		
Registered voters	46,204				
Sources
Footnotes: ^{1} People's Coalition results are compared to Democratic Coalition totals in the 1979 election.; ^{2} Galicianist Party results are compared to Galician Unity totals in the 1979 election.; ^{3} Galician Nationalist Bloc results are compared to Galician National-Popular Bloc totals in the 1979 election.

=== Santiago de Compostela ===
Population: 82,404

← Summary of the 8 May 1983 City Council of Santiago de Compostela election results →
Parties and alliances	Popular vote			Seats	
Parties and alliances	Votes	%	±pp	Total	+/−
People's Coalition (AP–PDP–UL)^{1}	11,659	36.70	+23.29	11	+8
Socialists' Party of Galicia (PSdG–PSOE)	9,924	31.24	+19.24	10	+7
Liberal Democratic Party (PDL)	3,391	10.67	New	3	+3
Communist Party of Galicia (PCE–PCG)	1,633	5.14	−4.15	1	−1
Galician Left (EG)	1,478	4.65	New	0	±0
Independents (INDEP)	1,309	4.12	New	0	±0
Galician Coalition–Convergence of Independents of Galicia (CG–CIGA)^{2}	905	2.85	−14.83	0	−5
Galician Nationalist Bloc (BNG)^{3}	797	2.51	−6.85	0	−2
Democratic and Social Centre (CDS)	675	2.12	New	0	±0
Union of the Democratic Centre (UCD)	n/a	n/a	−35.07	0	−10
Blank ballots	0	0.00	±0.00		
Total	31,771			25	±0
Valid votes	31,771	100.00	+2.07		
Invalid votes	0	0.00	−2.07		
Votes cast / turnout	31,771	51.59	+2.53		
Abstentions	29,807	48.41	−2.53		
Registered voters	61,578				
Sources
Footnotes: ^{1} People's Coalition results are compared to Democratic Coalition totals in the 1979 election.; ^{2} Galician Coalition–Convergence of Independents of Galicia results are compared to Galician Unity totals in the 1979 election.; ^{3} Galician Nationalist Bloc results are compared to Galician National-Popular Bloc totals in the 1979 election.

=== Vigo ===
Population: 261,331

← Summary of the 8 May 1983 City Council of Vigo election results →
Parties and alliances	Popular vote			Seats	
Parties and alliances	Votes	%	±pp	Total	+/−
Socialists' Party of Galicia (PSdG–PSOE)	41,364	38.80	+12.50	12	+4
People's Coalition (AP–PDP–UL)^{1}	35,776	33.56	+21.77	11	+8
Governing Independent Viguese (VIGO)	10,556	9.90	New	3	+3
Communist Party of Galicia (PCE–PCG)	6,048	5.67	−4.60	1	−2
Galician Left (EG)	4,780	4.48	New	0	±0
Democratic and Social Centre (CDS)	2,145	2.01	New	0	±0
Galician Nationalist Bloc (BNG)^{2}	1,994	1.87	−4.47	0	−1
Galicianist Party (PG)^{3}	1,915	1.80	−8.52	0	−3
Workers' Socialist Party (PST)	1,223	1.15	New	0	±0
Pontevedran Unity (UP)	814	0.76	New	0	±0
Union of the Democratic Centre (UCD)	n/a	n/a	−30.19	0	−9
Blank ballots	0	0.00	±0.00		
Total	106,615			27	±0
Valid votes	106,615	100.00	+1.77		
Invalid votes	0	0.00	−1.77		
Votes cast / turnout	106,615	56.66	+5.12		
Abstentions	81,553	43.34	−5.12		
Registered voters	188,168				
Sources
Footnotes: ^{1} People's Coalition results are compared to Democratic Coalition totals in the 1979 election.; ^{2} Galician Nationalist Bloc results are compared to Galician National-Popular Bloc totals in the 1979 election.; ^{3} Galicianist Party results are compared to Galician Unity totals in the 1979 election.
