= 1989 Galician regional election =

Election in the Spanish region of Galicia

- 17 December 1989

All 75 seats in the Parliament of Galicia 38 seats needed for a majority
- Opinion polls
- Registered: 2,246,455 ▲0.9%
- Turnout: 1,336,578 (59.5%) ▲2.1 pp
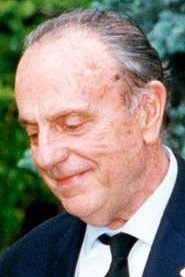

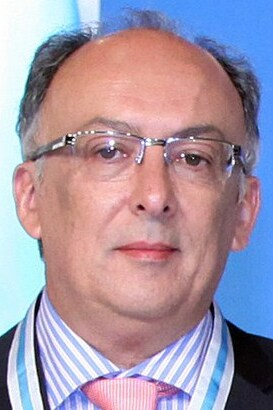

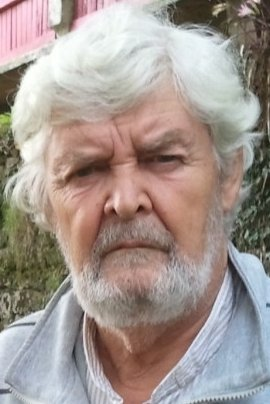

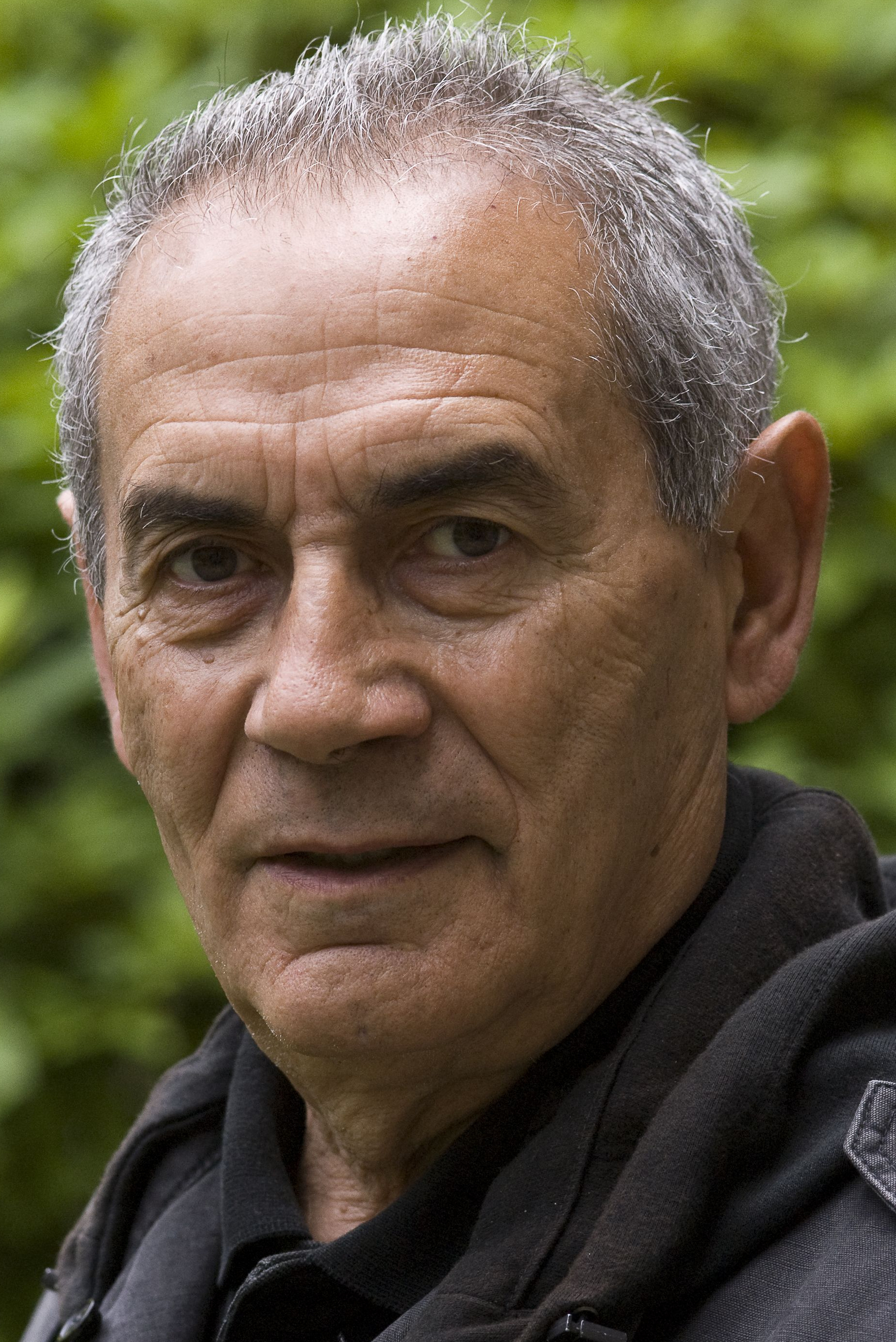

	First party	Second party	Third party
Leader	Manuel Fraga	Fernando González Laxe	Xosé Manuel Beiras
Party	PP	PSdeG–PSOE	BNG
Leader since	1989	19 June 1985	1982
Leader's seat	Lugo	La Coruña	La Coruña
Last election	34 seats, 40.9% (Note: Results for AP–PDP–PL–CdG in the 1985 election.)	22 seats, 28.7%	1 seat, 4.2%
Seats won	38	28	5
Seat change	▲4	▲6	▲4
Popular vote	583,579	433,256	105,703
Percentage	44.0%	32.7%	8.0%
Swing	▲3.1 pp	▲4.0 pp	▲3.8 pp
	Fourth party	Fifth party
Leader	Camilo Nogueira	Xosé Luís Barreiro
Party	PSG–EG	CG
Leader since	1980	22 November 1987
Leader's seat	Pontevedra	Orense
Last election	3 seats, 5.7%	11 seats, 12.9%
Seats won	2	2
Seat change	▼1	▼9
Popular vote	50,047	48,208
Percentage	3.8%	3.6%
Swing	▼1.9 pp	▼9.3 pp
- Constituency results map for the Parliament of Galicia
President before election
Fernando González Laxe
PSdeG–PSOE
President after election
Manuel Fraga
PP

A regional election was held in Galicia on 17 December 1989 to elect the 3rd Parliament of the autonomous community. All 75 seats in the Parliament were up for election.

== Overview ==
Under the 1981 Statute of Autonomy, the Parliament of Galicia was the unicameral legislature of the homonymous autonomous community, having legislative power in devolved matters, as well as the ability to grant or withdraw confidence from a regional president. The electoral and procedural rules were supplemented by national law provisions.

=== Date ===
The term of the Parliament of Galicia expired four years after the date of its previous election, unless it was dissolved earlier. The election decree was required to be issued no later than 25 days before the scheduled expiration date of parliament and published on the following day in the Official Journal of Galicia (DOG), with election day taking place between 54 and 60 days after the decree's publication. The previous election was held on 24 November 1985, which meant that the legislature's term would have expired on 24 November 1989. The election decree was required to be published in the DOG no later than 31 October 1989, setting the latest possible date for election day on 30 December 1989.

Amendments in 1988 granted the regional president the prerogative to dissolve the Parliament of Galicia at any given time and call a snap election, provided that it did not occur before one year after a previous one under this procedure. In the event of an investiture process failing to elect a regional president within a two-month period from the first ballot, the Parliament was to be automatically dissolved and a fresh election called.

The Parliament of Galicia was officially dissolved on 24 October 1989 with the publication of the corresponding decree in the DOG, setting election day for 17 December and scheduling for the chamber to reconvene on 16 January 1990.

=== Electoral system ===
Voting for the Parliament was based on universal suffrage, comprising all Spanish nationals over 18 years of age, registered in Galicia and with full political rights, provided that they had not been deprived of the right to vote by a final sentence, nor were legally incapacitated.

The Parliament of Galicia had a minimum of 60 and a maximum of 80 seats, with electoral provisions fixing its size at 75. All were elected in four multi-member constituencies—corresponding to the provinces of A Coruña, Lugo, Ourense and Pontevedra, each of which was assigned an initial minimum of 10 seats and the remaining 35 distributed in proportion to population—using the D'Hondt method and closed-list proportional voting, with a three percent-threshold of valid votes (including blank ballots) in each constituency. The use of this electoral method resulted in a higher effective threshold depending on district magnitude and vote distribution.

As a result of the aforementioned allocation, each Parliament constituency was entitled the following seats:

Seats	Constituencies
24	La Coruña^{(+2)}
21	Pontevedra^{(+2)}
15	Lugo, Orense

The law did not provide for by-elections to fill vacant seats; instead, any vacancies arising after the proclamation of candidates and during the legislative term were filled by the next candidates on the party lists or, when required, by designated substitutes.

=== Outgoing parliament ===
The table below shows the composition of the parliamentary groups in the chamber at the time of dissolution.

Parliamentary composition in October 1989
Groups	Parties	Legislators	
Groups	Parties	Seats	Total
People's Parliamentary Group of Galicia	PP	27	29
People's Parliamentary Group of Galicia	CdG	2	29
Socialists of Galicia's Parliamentary Group	PSdeG–PSOE	20	20
Galician Coalition Parliamentary Group	CG	11	11
Mixed Parliamentary Group	PSG–EG	3	11
Mixed Parliamentary Group	PNG–PG	3	11
Mixed Parliamentary Group	EN	1	11
Mixed Parliamentary Group	INDEP	4 (Note: Alfredo Atria and Francisco González Amadiós, former PSdeG–PSOE legislators; Lois Cordeiro and Carlos Mella, former PNG–PG legislators.)	11

== Opinion polls ==
The tables below list opinion polling results in reverse chronological order, showing the most recent first and using the dates when the survey fieldwork was done, as opposed to the date of publication. Where the fieldwork dates are unknown, the date of publication is given instead. The highest percentage figure in each polling survey is displayed with its background shaded in the leading party's colour. If a tie ensues, this is applied to the figures with the highest percentages. The "Lead" column on the right shows the percentage-point difference between the parties with the highest percentages in a poll.

=== Voting intention estimates ===
The table below lists weighted voting intention estimates. Refusals are generally excluded from the party vote percentages, while question wording and the treatment of "don't know" responses and those not intending to vote may vary between polling organisations. When available, seat projections determined by the polling organisations are displayed below (or in place of) the percentages in a smaller font; 38 seats were required for an absolute majority in the Parliament of Galicia (36 in the 1985 election). (Note: The Law No. 2 of 13 August 1985 set the Parliament's size at 75, but it was established that such a provision would not be applicable to the first election held after the law's passing.)

Polling firm/Commissioner	Fieldwork date	Sample size	Turnout	AP–PDP–PL–CdG	PSdeG–PSOE	CG	PSG–EG	BNG	CDS	EU	AP	PP	ARM	Lead
1989 regional election	17 Dec 1989	—N/a	59.5	–	32.7; 28	3.6; 2	3.8; 2	8.0; 5	2.9; 0	1.5; 0	(Note: Within PP.)	44.0; 38	0.5; 0	11.3
El Correo Gallego	11 Dec 1989	?	?	–	? 24/27	? 4/5	? 1/2	? 1/2	? 1/3	? 1		? 37/39	–	?
Demoscopia/El País	30 Nov–4 Dec 1989	1,600	58–60	–	34.0; 30/31	? 2	? 2	? 3	? 2	? 0		39.0; 35/36	–	5.0
Sigma Dos/COPE	2 Dec 1989	?	?	–	32.2; 25/27	? 2	? 3	? 2/3	5.4; 3/4	? 2		40.0; 34/38	–	7.8
Demoscopia/El País	14–19 Nov 1989	1,600	55–60	–	? 27/30	? 2	? 2/3	? 2/3	? 3/4	? 0/1		? 33/37	–	?
1989 general election	29 Oct 1989	—N/a	60.1	–	34.6 (29)	3.4 (2)	2.6 (0)	3.6 (2)	7.8 (6)	3.3 (1)		39.0 (35)	1.0 (0)	4.4
Eco Consulting	16 Jul 1989	?	?	–	? 28	? 2	? 4	? 3	? 3	–		? 35	–	?
1989 EP election	15 Jun 1989	—N/a	42.7	–	33.0 (30)	3.1 (2)	3.3 (2)	4.2 (2)	6.7 (5)	2.0 (0)		33.5 (32)	4.3 (2)	0.5
Gallup/Ya	18–19 Sep 1987	?	?	–	28.3	7.2	–	–	–	–	43.0	–	–	14.7
1987 EP election	10 Jun 1987	—N/a	57.1	–	29.6 (26)	–	2.9 (0)	3.7 (1)	10.2 (7)	1.3 (0)	41.7 (41)	–	–	12.1
1986 general election	22 Jun 1986	—N/a	57.9	39.2 (34)	35.8 (29)	6.2 (5)	3.6 (2)	2.1 (0)	8.6 (5)	1.1 (0)	(Note: Within CP.)	–	–	3.4
1985 regional election	24 Nov 1985	—N/a	57.4	40.9; 34	28.7; 22	12.9; 11	5.7; 3	4.2; 1	3.3; 0	0.8; 0		–	–	12.2

== Results ==
=== Overall ===
← Summary of the 17 December 1989 Parliament of Galicia election results →
Parties and alliances	Popular vote			Seats	
Parties and alliances	Votes	%	±pp	Total	+/−
People's Party (PP)^{1}	583,579	44.02	+3.13	38	+4
Socialists' Party of Galicia (PSdeG–PSOE)	433,256	32.68	+4.01	28	+6
Galician Nationalist Bloc (BNG)	105,703	7.97	+3.77	5	+4
Galician Socialist Party–Galician Left (PSG–EG)	50,047	3.78	−1.89	2	−1
Galician Coalition (CG)	48,208	3.64	−9.30	2	−9
Democratic and Social Centre (CDS)	38,214	2.88	−0.40	0	±0
United Left (EU)^{2}	19,774	1.49	+0.65	0	±0
Galician Nationalist Party–Galicianist Party (PNG–PG)	18,036	1.36	New	0	±0
Ruiz-Mateos Group (ARM)	7,058	0.53	New	0	±0
Workers' Socialist Party (PST)	3,724	0.28	−0.49	0	±0
The Greens of Galicia (OVG)	3,214	0.24	New	0	±0
The Ecologist Greens (OVE)	2,789	0.21	New	0	±0
Galician People's Front (FPG)	2,629	0.20	New	0	±0
Communist Party of the Galician People (PCPG)	989	0.07	New	0	±0
Humanist Platform (PH)	748	0.06	−0.52	0	±0
United Galicia Party (PGU)	746	0.06	New	0	±0
Spanish Phalanx of the CNSO (FE–JONS)	691	0.05	−0.18	0	±0
Communist Party of Spain (Marxist–Leninist) (PCE (m–l))	530	0.04	−0.08	0	±0
Alliance for the Republic (AxR)	437	0.03	New	0	±0
Blank ballots	5,285	0.40	−0.28		
Total	1,325,657			75	+4
Valid votes	1,325,657	99.18	+0.38		
Invalid votes	10,921	0.82	−0.38		
Votes cast / turnout	1,336,578	59.50	+2.10		
Abstentions	909,877	40.50	−2.10		
Registered voters	2,246,455				
Sources
Footnotes: ^{1} People's Party results are compared to People's Coalition totals in the 1985 election.; ^{2} United Left results are compared to Communist Party of Galicia totals in the 1985 election.

Popular vote
PP	44.02%
PSdeG–PSOE	32.68%
BNG	7.97%
PSG–EG	3.78%
CG	3.64%
CDS	2.88%
EU	1.49%
PNG–PG	1.36%
Others	1.78%
Blank ballots	0.40%

Seats
PP	50.67%
PSdeG–PSOE	37.33%
BNG	6.67%
PSG–EG	2.67%
CG	2.67%

=== Distribution by constituency ===
Constituency	PP		PSdeG		BNG		PSG–EG		CG	
Constituency	%	S	%	S	%	S	%	S	%	S
La Coruña	40.9	11	35.3	10	9.3	2	4.1	1	1.6	–
Lugo	48.1	8	30.9	5	6.6	1	1.7	–	7.2	1
Orense	44.1	8	32.8	6	5.4	–	2.1	–	6.4	1
Pontevedra	45.8	11	30.2	7	8.1	2	5.1	1	3.1	–
Total	44.0	38	32.7	28	8.0	5	3.8	2	3.6	2

== Aftermath ==
=== Government formation ===
Investiture; Nomination of Manuel Fraga (PP)
Ballot →	31 January 1990
Required majority →	38 out of 75
Yes: • PP–CdG (38)	38 / 75
No: • PSdeG (28); • BNG (5); • CG (2); • PSG–EG (2)	37 / 75
Abstentions	0 / 75
Absentees	0 / 75

== Bibliography ==
- Ley Orgánica 1/1981, de 6 de abril, de Estatuto de Autonomía para Galicia (Organic Law 1/1981). Official State Gazette (in Spanish). 6 April 1981 [version as of 28 April 1981]. BOE-A-1981-9564.
- Ley 1/1983, de 22 de febrero, reguladora de la Junta y su Presidente (Law 1/1983). Official State Gazette (in Spanish). 22 February 1983 [version as of 10 October 1989]. BOE-A-1983-23788.
- Ley Orgánica 5/1985, de 19 de junio, del Régimen Electoral General (Organic Law 5/1985). Official State Gazette (in Spanish). 19 June 1985 [version as of 3 April 1987]. BOE-A-1985-11672.
- Ley 8/1985, de 13 de agosto, de elecciones al Parlamento de Galicia (Law 8/1985). Official State Gazette (in Spanish). 13 August 1985 [version as of 16 August 1985]. BOE-A-1985-21380.
- Decreto 213/1989, de 23 de octubre, de disolución del Parlamento de Galicia y de convocatoria de elecciones (Decree 213/1989). Official State Gazette (in Spanish). 23 October 1989. BOE-A-1989-25725.
