= 1981 Galician regional election =

Election in the Spanish region of Galicia

- 20 October 1981

All 71 seats in the Parliament of Galicia 36 seats needed for a majority
- Opinion polls
- Registered: 2,174,246
- Turnout: 1,006,222 (46.3%)
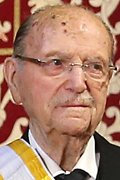

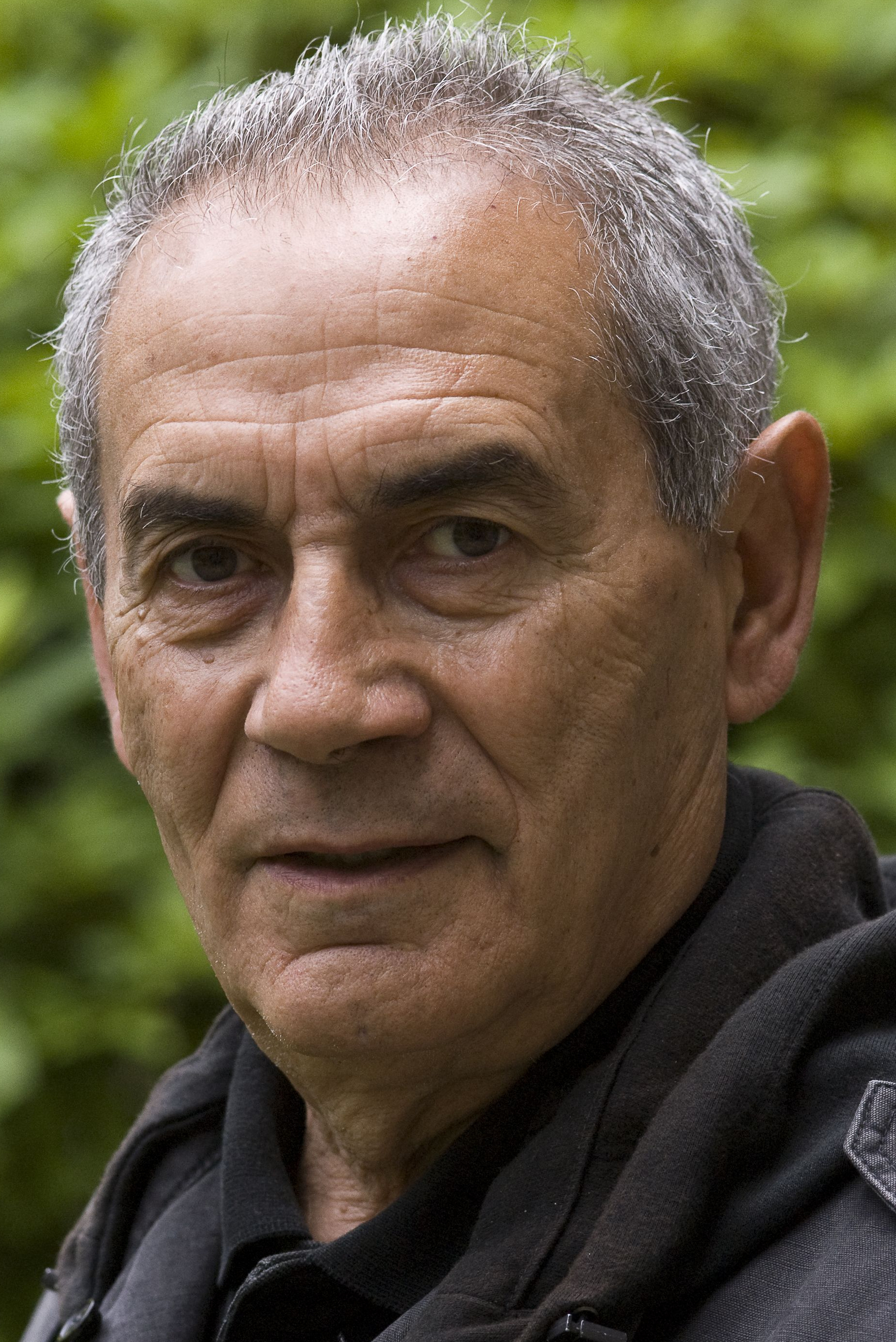

	First party	Second party	Third party
Leader	Gerardo Fernández Albor	José Quiroga Suárez	Francisco Vázquez
Party	AP	UCD	PSdG–PSOE
Leader since	27 August 1981	9 June 1979	1980
Leader's seat	La Coruña	Orense	La Coruña
Seats won	26	24	16
Popular vote	301,039	274,191	193,456
Percentage	30.5%	27.8%	19.6%
	Fourth party	Fifth party	Sixth party
Leader	Bautista Álvarez	Camilo Nogueira	Joaquín Alvarez Corbacho
Party	BNPG–PSG	EG	PCE
Leader since	1977	1980	6 September 1981
Leader's seat	La Coruña	Pontevedra	Pontevedra (lost)
Seats won	3	1	1
Popular vote	61,870	33,497	28,927
Percentage	6.3%	3.4%	2.9%
- Constituency results map for the Parliament of Galicia
President before election
José Quiroga Suárez
UCD
President after election
Gerardo Fernández Albor
AP

A regional election was held in Galicia on 20 October 1981 to elect the 1st Parliament of the autonomous community. All 71 seats in the Parliament were up for election. It was held concurrently with a Statute of Autonomy referendum in Andalusia.

The governing Union of the Democratic Centre (UCD), which had been expected to maintain its primacy in a region where it had obtained favourable results in the general elections of 1977 and 1979, won 27.8% and 24 seats to come in second place to Manuel Fraga's People's Alliance (AP), which won the election with 30.5% of the vote and 26 seats. The Socialists' Party of Galicia (PSdG–PSOE), while faring better that in the general elections, did not secure the expected gains, obtaining 19.6% of the vote and 16 seats. The Communist Party of Galicia (PCE–PCG) secured 1 seat after the voiding of 1,100 PSOE votes in the La Coruña constituency deprived the Socialists from a 17th seat. Of the nationalist parties, only the Galician National-Popular Bloc–Galician Socialist Party (BNPG–PSG) and Galician Left (EG) secured parliamentary representation, with 3 and 1 seat respectively.

An agreement between AP and UCD allowed Gerardo Fernández Albor to be elected as regional president, at the head of a minority cabinet with UCD's external support. The 1981 Galician election marked the beginning of the end for the UCD as a relevant political force in Spanish politics, confirming its ever more dwindling support among voters and AP's growth at its expense. The 1982 Andalusian election held seven months later would signal a further blow to UCD, accelerating the internal decomposition of the party into the next general election.

== Background ==
Negotiations for a new statute of autonomy for Galicia had its roots in the 1936 Statute, voted in referendum and submitted to the Spanish parliament for ratification, but never enforced due to the outbreak of the Spanish Civil War. Galicia was granted a pre-autonomic regime after Francisco Franco's death in 1975 and during the Spanish transition to democracy, together with the Valencian Country, Aragon and the Canary Islands and based on the examples of Catalonia and the Basque Country. The establishment of the Regional Government of Galicia (Galician: Xunta de Galicia) was formalized with its official approval on 18 March 1978 and the appointment of the first provisional government under UCD's Antonio Rosón in June that year. The subsequent Spanish Constitution of 1978 and the celebration in Spain of the first ordinary general election paved the way for the re-establishment of the "historical communities" of the Basque Country, Catalonia and Galicia, under the "fast-track" procedure of Article 151 of the Constitution, setting the first steps for the institutionalization of the so-called "State of the Autonomies".

Negotiations between the various parties led to the signing of the "Hostel Pacts" (Spanish: Pacto del Hostal) on 26 September 1980, and the subsequent approval of a draft Statute of Autonomy for Galicia that was to be ratified in referendum. Above 70% of those voting in the referendum held on 21 December 1980 supported the Statute, albeit under a very low turnout of 28%. The result prompted the UCD to remain alone in government, after the resignation of its only AP member and the PSOE's refusal to rejoin it—having left in November 1979 over disagreements on the Statute issue—without a profound renovation, which the UCD rejected.

Plans to hold the first regional election by the end of April or the beginning of May 1981 were cast off as a result of a delay in the approval of the regional Statute, amid accusations that UCD was holding off the text from final ratification in the Cortes Generales over the party's deteriorating situation in Galicia as a result of the referendum's outcome. The Statute was finally brought to the Congress where it passed on 17 February 1981 with 301 ayes, 3 abstentions and no negative votes, being finally ratified by the Senate on 17 March. As a result, executive procedures were initiated so as to establish the new autonomous community and hold the first Parliament election, which was finally set for 20 October 1981.

== Overview ==
Under the 1981 Statute of Autonomy, the Parliament of Galicia was the unicameral legislature of the homonymous autonomous community, having legislative power in devolved matters, as well as the ability to grant or withdraw confidence from a regional president. The electoral and procedural rules were supplemented by national law provisions (which were those used in the 1977 general election).

=== Date ===
The Provisional Government of Galicia, in agreement with the Government of Spain, was required to call an election to the Parliament of Galicia within 120 days after the date of enactment of the Statute, with election day taking place within 60 days after the call. The Statute was published in the Official State Gazette on 28 April 1981, setting the latest possible election date for the Parliament on 25 October 1981.

Initially, 15 or 18 October 1981 were considered as the most likely dates for the election, but members of the governing Union of the Democratic Centre (UCD) did not rule out it taking place up to one week later, with 25 October also being considered to have election day on a Sunday. On 21 August, and after deliberation by the Provisional Government and in agreement with the State Government, President José Quiroga called the election for 20 October.

=== Electoral system ===
Voting for the Parliament is based on universal suffrage, comprising all Spanish nationals over 18 years of age, registered in Galicia and with full political rights, provided that they have not been deprived of the right to vote by a final sentence, nor were legally incapacitated.

The Parliament of Galicia had 71 seats in its first election. All were elected in four multi-member constituencies—corresponding to the provinces of A Coruña, Lugo, Ourense and Pontevedra, each of which was assigned a fixed number of seats—using the D'Hondt method and closed-list proportional voting, with a three percent-threshold of valid votes (including blank ballots) in each constituency. The use of this electoral method resulted in a higher effective threshold depending on district magnitude and vote distribution.

As a result of the aforementioned allocation, each Parliament constituency was entitled the following seats:

Seats	Constituencies
22	La Coruña
19	Pontevedra
15	Lugo, Orense

The law did not provide for by-elections to fill vacant seats; instead, any vacancies arising after the proclamation of candidates and during the legislative term were filled by the next candidates on the party lists or, when required, by designated substitutes.

== Parties and candidates ==
The electoral law allowed for parties and federations registered in the interior ministry, alliances and groupings of electors to present lists of candidates. Parties and federations intending to form an alliance were required to inform the relevant electoral commission within 15 days of the election call, whereas groupings of electors needed to secure the signature of at least one permille—and, in any case, 500 signatures—of the electorate in the constituencies for which they sought election, disallowing electors from signing for more than one list.

Below is a list of the main parties and alliances which contested the election:

Candidacy	Parties and alliances	Leading candidate	Ideology	Gov.	Ref.
UCD	List: Union of the Democratic Centre (UCD)	José Quiroga	Christian democracy Social democracy Liberalism	Yes	
PSdG–PSOE	List: Socialists' Party of Galicia (PSdG–PSOE)	Francisco Vázquez	Social democracy	No	
AP	List: People's Alliance (AP)	Gerardo Fernández Albor	Conservatism; National conservatism	No	
BNPG–PSG	List: Galician People's Union (UPG); Galician National-Popular Assembly (ANPG); Galician Socialist Party (PSG)	Bautista Álvarez	Galician nationalism Left-wing nationalism	No	
EG	List: Galician Left (EG)	Camilo Nogueira	Galician nationalism Left-wing nationalism	No	
PG	List: Galicianist Party (PG)	Alfonso Alvarez Gándara	Galician nationalism Social liberalism	No	
PCE–PCG	List: Communist Party of Galicia (PCE–PCG)	Joaquín Alvarez Corbacho	Eurocommunism	No	

José María David Suárez Núñez, rector of the University of Santiago de Compostela, had been initially proposed by UCD as their leading candidate replacing José Quiroga, but in an unexpected move Quiroga's supporters outnumbered Suárez Núñez's candidacy by two votes, provoking a crisis within the Galician branch of the UCD over the disputed Quiroga's candidacy. The various UCD factions reached a compromise to put off internal quarrelling to prevent giving voters an image of disunity, by maintaining Quiroga as candidate over the difficulties in finding a replacement before the deadline for presenting lists of candidates expired.

The Socialists' Party of Galicia (PSdG–PSOE) included many Galician intellectuals within their lists, while the People's Alliance (AP) chose Gerardo Fernández Albor as their leading candidate. While an electoral coalition between UCD and AP was considered, both parties discarded such a possibility. In July 1980, the Galician Socialist Party (PSG) and the constituent parties of the Galician National-Popular Bloc (BNPG), the Galician People's Union (UPG) and the Galician National-Popular Assembly (ANPG), agreed to form an alliance. The Galicianist Party (PG) had sufferent an important internal crisis in June 1981.

A total of 986 candidates from 18 political parties stood for election, with eleven candidacies running in all four provinces: the main parties UCD, PSOE, AP, BNPG–PSG, EG, PG and PCE, as well as the Galician Socialist Unity–PSOE (historical) (USG–PSOE), the Revolutionary Communist League–Communist Movement (LCR–MCG) alliance, the Spanish Ruralist Party (PRE) and the Workers' Socialist Party (PST).

== Campaign ==
The campaign was dominated by the perception that the ruling Union of the Democratic Centre (UCD) would achieve a precarious victory, as well as on the question of turnout, as it was feared that the high abstention rates that had dominated elections and referendums in Galicia up until that time would be repeated: 39.3% in the 1977 general election, 49.8% in the 1978 constitutional referendum, 50.8% in the 1979 general election and 71.7% in the 1980 Statute referendum.

Party slogans
Candidacies	Original slogan	English translation	Ref.
UCD	« Defiende lo tuyo »	"Defend what is yours"	
PSdG–PSOE	« Galicia quiere vivir » « Haz Galicia viva »	"Galicia wants to live" "Make Galicia alive"	
AP	« Galegos coma ti »	"Galician like yourself"	
PG	« Somos gallegos »	"We are Galician"	

The UCD emphasized the defense of values such as personal freedom and regional culture, the modernization of key economic sectors such as fishing and agriculture, the identity of the Spanish nation and an efficient autonomy for Galicia. The party's aim was to maintain the regional hegemony that it obtained in the 1977 and 1979 by preserving the vote from conservative, small landowners. The UCD campaign was notable for keeping with a policy of inauguration of public works and the involvement of several high-ranking ministers and members, such as Prime Minister Leopoldo Calvo-Sotelo, or his predecessor Adolfo Suárez. Politically, the party failed at targeting a single rival: some members sought to minimize losses to AP whereas others advocated for discrediting the PSOE as a viable government alternative to UCD, while concurrently discarding any-post election alliance with either party.

The Spanish Socialist Workers' Party (PSOE), the main opposition party of Spain at the time, advocated for an improvement of the Statute and in presenting a renewed image of moderation ahead of incoming elections throughout the rest of the country. Party leader Felipe González campaigned throughout Galicia with the aim of consolidating the party's gains in opinion polls, while the party considered the eventuality of a UCD–PSOE post-election arrangement as "unlikely", convinced that the UCD would choose to pact with AP instead.

The right-wing People's Alliance (AP) focused on the personal appeal of its national leader, Manuel Fraga—of Galician descent—a move which received criticism from other political parties, which dubbed it as "a trap to the electorate", because Fraga was not standing as candidate in the election. AP also tried to highlight the party's alleged "Galician personality" by campaigning extensively throughout rural areas—which had remained UCD strongholds in previous elections—aiming at securing strong gains in the region at the expense of the ruling party. The party's secretary general Jorge Verstrynge went on to claim that AP was "entirely committed to the Galician election".

The various Galician nationalist parties—mainly the Galician National-Popular Bloc–Galician Socialist Party (BNPG–PSG) alliance, the Galicianist Party (PG) and Galician Left (EG)—had little prospects of posing a challenge to the main Spanish political parties as a result of internal infighting, a shortage of economic resources and a small membership. Concurrently, the Regional Government of Galicia launched a 120 million Pta-worth institutional campaign under the "Vote for yours" (Spanish: Vota a los tuyos) slogan to try to fire up turnout. The Galician Businessmen Confederation launched their own campaign by investing 110 million Pta into prompting turnout while showing their rejection of proposals from left-wing parties. Galician bishops also entered the campaign by asking to vote "for the options that, at least, will not act against some of the fundamental elements that integrate the common good from the perspective of the Christian faith".

At the end of their respective campaigns, UCD and AP denounced each other for foul playing: the UCD accused AP of using Calvo-Sotelo's image in their benefit, whereas the latter accused the former of handing out leaflets falsely claiming that Fraga was asking for voting UCD. Calls for tactical voting were also common from UCD, PSOE and AP.

== Opinion polls ==
The tables below lists opinion polling results in reverse chronological order, showing the most recent first and using the dates when the survey fieldwork was done, as opposed to the date of publication. Where the fieldwork dates are unknown, the date of publication is given instead. The highest percentage figure in each polling survey is displayed with its background shaded in the leading party's colour. If a tie ensues, this is applied to the figures with the highest percentages. The "Lead" column on the right shows the percentage-point difference between the parties with the highest percentages in a poll.

=== Voting intention estimates ===
The table below lists weighted voting intention estimates. Refusals are generally excluded from the party vote percentages, while question wording and the treatment of "don't know" responses and those not intending to vote may vary between polling organisations. When available, seat projections determined by the polling organisations are displayed below (or in place of) the percentages in a smaller font; 36 seats were required for an absolute majority in the Parliament of Galicia.

Polling firm/Commissioner	Fieldwork date	Sample size	Turnout	UCD	PSdG–PSOE	AP	BNPG	PG	PCE–PCG	EG	Lead
1981 regional election	20 Oct 1981	—N/a	46.3	27.8; 24	19.6; 16	30.5; 26	6.3; 3	3.3; 0	2.9; 1	3.4; 1	2.7
UCD	18 Oct 1981	?	?	35.0; 30	? 17	? 13	–	–	–	–	?
CEOE	17 Oct 1981	?	?	? 13	? 21	? 24	? 7	? 5	? 1	–	?
UCD	30 Sep–2 Oct 1981	?	45	? 30/32	? 20/22	? 12/14	–	–	–	–	?
Carballo	25 Aug 1981	1,007	51	26.0	33.0	–	–	–	–	–	7.0
PSdG–PSOE (Note: Undecided and/or abstentionists excluded.)	15 Jul 1981	2,000	?	27.0	32.0	13.5	12.5	7.5	3.5	3.5	5.0
Metra Seis	9 Jun 1981	?	?	28.5	13.0	26.5	14.5	8.0	9.5	–	2.0
UCD	29 Jan 1981	?	?	29.0	13.0	26.0	14.5	8.0	8.0	–	3.0
1979 local elections	3 Apr 1979	—N/a	51.5	36.4	14.4	13.8 (Note: Results for CD.)	7.3	6.4 (Note: Results for UG.)	4.5	–	22.0
1979 general election	1 Mar 1979	—N/a	49.2	48.2 (40)	17.3 (12)	14.2 (11)	6.0 (4)	5.4 (2)	4.2 (2)	–	30.9

=== Voting preferences ===
The table below lists raw, unweighted voting preferences.

Polling firm/Commissioner	Fieldwork date	Sample size	UCD	PSdG–PSOE	AP	BNPG	PG	PCE–PCG	EG	Question	X mark	Lead
1981 regional election	20 Oct 1981	—N/a	12.6	8.9	13.8	2.8	1.5	1.3	1.5	—N/a	53.7	1.2
Emopública/CIS	1 Oct 1981	2,000	11.5	13.5	12.7	3.4	3.4	1.4	–	38.0	14.0	0.8
Emopública/CIS	1 Sep 1981	2,000	14.0	17.0	11.0	3.0	3.0	2.0	–	32.0	16.0	3.0
Carballo	25 Aug 1981	1,007	19.0	24.0	–	–	–	–	–	–	–	5.0
PSdG–PSOE	15 Jul 1981	2,000	22.0	26.0	11.0	10.0	6.0	3.0	3.0	–	–	4.0
Metra Seis	9 Jun 1981	?	21.5	10.0	20.0	11.0	6.0	7.0	–	–	–	1.5
ECO/CIS	1 May 1981	1,600	10.0	15.0	5.0	3.0	1.0	1.0	–	60.0	5.0	5.0
UCD	29 Jan 1981	?	22.0	10.0	19.5	11.0	6.0	6.0	–	26.5		2.5
DATA/CIS	23 Sep–1 Oct 1980	1,686	19.0	13.2	7.0	3.9	5.2	1.8	–	34.3	15.2	5.8
1979 local elections	3 Apr 1979	—N/a	18.5	7.3	7.0*	3.7	3.2**	2.3	–	—N/a	48.5	11.2
1979 general election	1 Mar 1979	—N/a	23.3	8.4	6.9*	2.9	2.6**	2.0	–	—N/a	50.8	14.9
(*) Results for Democratic Coalition. (**) Results for Galician Unity.

=== Victory likelihood ===
The table below lists opinion polling on the perceived likelihood of victory for each party in the event of a regional election taking place.

Polling firm/Commissioner	Fieldwork date	Sample size	UCD	PSdG–PSOE	AP	BNPG	PG	PCE–PCG	EG	Other/ None	Question	Lead
Emopública/CIS	1 Oct 1981	2,001	27.9	9.1	10.7	0.5	0.8	0.5	–	0.2	50.3	17.2
Emopública/CIS	1 Sep 1981	2,000	32.0	16.0	6.0	1.0	1.0	–	–	–	44.0	16.0

== Results ==
=== Overall ===
Summary of the 20 October 1981 Parliament of Galicia election results →
Parties and alliances	Popular vote			Seats	
Parties and alliances	Votes	%	±pp	Total	+/−
People's Alliance (AP)	301,039	30.52	n/a	26	n/a
Union of the Democratic Centre (UCD)	274,191	27.80	n/a	24	n/a
Socialists' Party of Galicia (PSdG–PSOE)	193,456	19.62	n/a	16	n/a
Galician National-Popular Bloc–Galician Socialist Party (BNPG–PSG)	61,870	6.27	n/a	3	n/a
Galician Left (EG)	33,497	3.40	n/a	1	n/a
Galicianist Party (PG)	32,623	3.31	n/a	0	n/a
Communist Party of Galicia (PCE–PCG)	28,927	2.93	n/a	1	n/a
Workers' Socialist Party (PST)	18,249	1.85	n/a	0	n/a
Galician Socialist Unity–PSOE (USG–PSOE)	12,709	1.29	n/a	0	n/a
La Coruña Capital Defense Independents (IDC)	5,486	0.56	n/a	0	n/a
Galician Brotherhood (IG)	4,929	0.50	n/a	0	n/a
Revolutionary Communist League–Communist Movement (LCR–MCG)	4,858	0.49	n/a	0	n/a
Spanish Ruralist Party (PRE)	4,291	0.44	n/a	0	n/a
New Force (FN)	3,950	0.40	n/a	0	n/a
Spanish Democratic Right (DDE)	2,022	0.21	n/a	0	n/a
Spanish Phalanx of the CNSO (FE–JONS)	1,498	0.15	n/a	0	n/a
Liberated Galiza (GC)	1,433	0.15	n/a	0	n/a
Communist Party of Spain (Marxist–Leninist) (PCE (m–l))	1,216	0.12	n/a	0	n/a
Blank ballots	0	0.00	n/a		
Total	986,244			71	n/a
Valid votes	986,244	98.01	n/a		
Invalid votes	19,978	1.99	n/a		
Votes cast / turnout	1,006,222	46.28	n/a		
Abstentions	1,168,024	53.72	n/a		
Registered voters	2,174,246				

Popular vote
AP	30.52%
UCD	27.80%
PSdG–PSOE	19.62%
BNPG–PSG	6.27%
EG	3.40%
PG	3.31%
PCG–PCE	2.93%
PST	1.85%
USG–PSOE	1.29%
Others	3.01%
Blank ballots	0.00%

Seats
AP	36.62%
UCD	33.80%
PSdG–PSOE	22.54%
BNPG–PSG	4.23%
EG	1.41%
PCG–PCE	1.41%

=== Distribution by constituency ===
Constituency	AP		UCD		PSdG		B–PSG		EG		PCG	
Constituency	%	S	%	S	%	S	%	S	%	S	%	S
La Coruña	32.7	9	19.5	5	24.0	6	6.7	1	3.3	–	3.4	1
Lugo	31.4	5	35.0	6	16.1	3	8.0	1	0.9	–	1.5	–
Orense	28.0	5	42.7	7	16.4	3	5.2	–	0.5	–	2.0	–
Pontevedra	28.6	7	28.2	6	17.2	4	5.5	1	5.9	1	3.4	–
Total	30.5	26	27.8	24	19.6	16	6.3	3	3.4	1	2.9	1

== Aftermath ==
=== Analysis ===
The victory of AP over UCD caught many by surprise. The then-ruling party of Spain had not been able to win in one its most favourable regions, scoring third in the most populous province of Galicia, La Coruña—taking 19.5% of the vote, behind PSOE's 24.0% and AP's 32.7%—while also narrowly failing to win in the other Atlantic province of Pontevedra. The party was able to keep its primacy in the provinces of Lugo and Orense, but it did so with much reduced majorities when compared to its results in the region at the 1979 general election. AP went on to win much of the urban vote, with UCD support mostly confined to the rural areas.

The success of AP was attributed to Fraga's personal charisma in his home region, but also on the scale of the UCD collapse, a result of a poor popular perception of the UCD's action of government at the national level—first under Adolfo Suárez, then under Leopoldo Calvo-Sotelo—its handling of economic crisis, the autonomic process—including the party's past stance on the Galician statute—and internal conflicts over the party's future and direction since its first electoral defeats in 1980—namely, in the Basque and Catalan elections and in the Andalusian referendum. However, Galicia was considered a safe UCD stronghold, and while it was expected that the party would lose ground, an electoral defeat under AP had not been foreseen. As a result, the election outcome came as a shock to the ruling party in Spain and aggravated the internal crisis between the different party families.

In the aftermath of the Galician election, Calvo-Sotelo would oust Agustín Rodríguez Sahagún as UCD national president to take the reins of the party himself, just as the government's parliamentary standing would weaken over a number of defections within the party's caucuses in the Cortes Generales: on the one hand, former justice minister Francisco Fernández Ordóñez would leave in November 1981, together with other nine Congress deputies, to establish the Democratic Action Party (PAD); on the other hand, three further deputies would defect to AP in January 1982. Going into 1982, the UCD would be trailing the PSOE in opinion polls at the national level by double digits, with a sustainable migration of voters to AP being detected by pollsters after the Galician election. In the May 1982 Andalusian election, the UCD would further collapse to third place behind both PSOE and AP, and by the time of the October 1982 general election it would become a minor political force slightly below 7% nationally, all of which would eventually lead to the party's dissolution in February 1983.

=== Government formation ===
After the election, AP sought an agreement with UCD and the implementation of their "natural majority" policy, under which the understanding of the right-of-centre political parties in Spain would lead to their eventual merging. UCD leaders were split on whether accepting AP's offer of forming a full coalition government, limiting themselves to granting external support to a minority AP cabinet from or not supporting AP at all over fears that such a pact would "denature" UCD's centrist appeal and push it to the right. Any government agreement between UCD or AP with the PSOE was discarded after the Socialists discarded themselves such possibility, while the post-election crisis within UCD delayed the start of formal negotiations well into November. The date of the regional Parliament's constitution was set for 19 December by the regional UCD government almost one month after the election, a move which received criticism from other political parties which considered it an improvisation, but which allowed AP enough time to organize the future government's composition.

AP and UCD formally agreed to have former UCD's regional president Antonio Rosón elected as the Parliament's new speaker, who was elected to the post with the support of 50 out of 71 votes. Both parties reached an investiture agreement to elect AP candidate Gerardo Fernández Albor, who was voted into the office of President of Galicia's Regional Government on 8 January 1982, and sworn in on 21 January at the helm of a minority cabinet.

Investiture; Nomination of Gerardo Fernández Albor (AP)
Ballot →	8 January 1982
Required majority →	36 out of 71
Yes: • AP (26); • UCD (23); • PSdG (3)	52 / 71
No: • PSdG (12); • BNPG–PSG (3); • EG (1); • PCG (1)	17 / 71
Abstentions: • PSdG (1)	1 / 71
Absentees: • UCD (1)	1 / 71

The government's stability throughout its first year of tenure would remain tenuous, with UCD not pledging a stable support and forcing AP to seek it on a case-by-case basis to avoid parliamentary defeats by an uneasy UCD–PSOE collaboration. This situation would last until the 1982 general election, when UCD's collapse and subsequent dissolution as a political party in February 1983 would lead to 12 of its former deputies to sign an agreement with AP, providing the government with a stable majority in exchange for their incorporation as cabinet members.

== Bibliography ==
- Real Decreto-ley 20/1977, de 18 de marzo, sobre Normas Electorales (Royal Decree-Law 20/1977). Official State Gazette (in Spanish). 18 March 1977. BOE-A-1977-7445.
- Ley Orgánica 1/1981, de 6 de abril, de Estatuto de Autonomía para Galicia (Organic Law 1/1981). Official State Gazette (in Spanish). 6 April 1981 [version as of 28 April 1981]. BOE-A-1981-9564.
- Decreto 30/1981, de 21 de agosto, de convocatoria de elecciones al Parlamento de Galicia (PDF) (Decree 30/1981). Official Journal of Galicia (in Spanish). 21 August 1981.
