= Galician Socialist Party–Galician Left =

Galician Socialist Party-Galician Left Partido Socialista Galego-Esquerda Galega
- Leader: Camilo Nogueira
- Founded: 1984
- Dissolved: 1993
- Merger of: Galician Left; Galician Socialist Party
- Youth wing: Youth Collectives of the PSG-EG
- Membership: 1,130 (1993)
- Ideology: Democratic socialism Galician nationalism Left-wing nationalism Pacifism; Ecologism
- Colors: Green

The Galician Socialist Party–Galician Left (PSG-EG, Partido Socialista Galego-Esquerda Galega in Galician language) was a Galician nationalist and left-wing party of Galiza.

== History ==
It was founded in 1984 with the union of the Galician Socialist Party (PSG) and Galician Left, led by Camilo Nogueira Román. In 1993 the PSG-EG formed with nationalist centre-left sectors a new Galician Unity coalition. In the general and autonomic elections of 1993 the party concurred with the United Left (EU) coalition, forming the Galician Unity-United Left (UG-EU) coalition. After the defeat in the elections, some members of the party converged with EU forming the Galician Left-United Left and the others joined the Galician Nationalist Bloc as Galician Unity. The party had 2 mayors: Narón (1985-1993) and Porqueira (1984-1987).

In 1993 it had 1,130 members in 67 local chapters, Vigo being the largest, with 160 members.

== Electoral results ==
=== Elections ===
Election	Votes	%	Seats	Mayors
Spanish municipal elections, 1983	28,995	2.21%	48 / 4,033	2 / 312
Galician parliamentary election, 1985	71,599	5.71%	3 / 71	-
Spanish general election, 1986	45,574	3.57%	0 / 350	-
Spanish municipal elections, 1987	57,062	4.25%	60 / 4,040	1 / 312
Galician parliamentary election, 1989	50,047	3.79%	2 / 75	-
Spanish general election, 1989	34,131	2.59%	0 / 350	-
Spanish municipal elections, 1991	39,116	2.83%	48 / 4,033	1 / 313
Galician parliamentary election, 1993 (Note: In the Galician Unity-United Left coalition.)	44,902	3.09%	0 / 75	-
Spanish general election, 1993 (Note: In the Galician Unity-United Left coalition.)	74,605	4.75%	0 / 350	-

== Gallery ==
PSG-EG Youth Collective sticker for peace. It says: Woman for peace. The PSG-EG was known for its strong pacifist and antimilitarist positions.
