= 1991 Spanish local elections in Galicia =

This article presents the results breakdown of the local elections held in Galicia on 26 May 1991. The following tables show detailed results in the autonomous community's most populous municipalities, sorted alphabetically.

== City control ==
The following table lists party control in the most populous municipalities, including provincial capitals (highlighted in bold). Gains for a party are highlighted in that party's colour.

Municipality	Population	Previous control	New control
**A Coruña**	256,579	Socialists' Party of Galicia (PSdeG–PSOE)	Socialists' Party of Galicia (PSdeG–PSOE)
Ferrol	86,272	Socialists' Party of Galicia (PSdeG–PSOE)	People's Party (PP) (PSdeG–PSOE in 1991)
**Lugo**	81,493	Galician Coalition (CG)	People's Party (PP)
**Ourense**	109,283	Independents of Galicia (IG)	Socialists' Party of Galicia (PSdeG–PSOE)
**Pontevedra**	70,356	Independents of Galicia (IG)	People's Party (PP)
Santiago de Compostela	91,419	Socialists' Party of Galicia (PSdeG–PSOE)	Socialists' Party of Galicia (PSdeG–PSOE)
Vigo	279,986	Socialists' Party of Galicia (PSdeG–PSOE)	Socialists' Party of Galicia (PSdeG–PSOE)

== Municipalities ==
=== A Coruña ===
Population: 256,579

← Summary of the 26 May 1991 City Council of A Coruña election results →
Parties and alliances	Popular vote			Seats	
Parties and alliances	Votes	%	±pp	Total	+/−
Socialists' Party of Galicia (PSdeG–PSOE)	66,445	59.26	+8.29	18	+1
People's Party (PP)^{1}	32,353	28.86	+4.16	9	+1
Galician Nationalist Bloc (BNG)	5,389	4.81	+2.35	0	±0
Galician Socialist Party–Galician Left (PSG–EG)	2,288	2.04	−1.63	0	±0
United Left (EU)	2,121	1.89	−0.32	0	±0
Democratic and Social Centre (CDS)	1,368	1.22	−6.04	0	−2
The Greens Ecologist–Humanist List (LVLE–H)^{2}	570	0.51	+0.29	0	±0
Workers' Socialist Party (PST)	344	0.31	−0.14	0	±0
Galicianist Party (PG)	149	0.13	New	0	±0
Blank ballots	1,089	0.97	−0.22		
Total	112,116			27	±0
Valid votes	112,116	99.73	+1.13		
Invalid votes	300	0.27	−1.13		
Votes cast / turnout	112,416	56.55	−2.42		
Abstentions	86,365	43.45	+2.42		
Registered voters	198,781				
Sources
Footnotes: ^{1} People's Party results are compared to People's Alliance totals in the 1987 election.; ^{2} The Greens Ecologist–Humanist List results are compared to Humanist Platform totals in the 1987 election.

=== Ferrol ===
Population: 86,272

← Summary of the 26 May 1991 City Council of Ferrol election results →
Parties and alliances	Popular vote			Seats	
Parties and alliances	Votes	%	±pp	Total	+/−
People's Party (PP)^{1}	13,453	38.05	+7.12	10	±0
Socialists' Party of Galicia (PSdeG–PSOE)	10,368	29.33	+8.46	8	+2
United Left (EU)	6,158	17.42	+2.15	5	±0
Galician Nationalist Bloc (BNG)	2,477	7.01	+2.32	2	+2
Galician Socialist Party–Galician Left (PSG–EG)	1,209	3.42	−0.56	0	±0
Democratic and Social Centre (CDS)	557	1.58	−12.34	0	−4
Galician Nationalist Convergence (CG–CdG)^{2}	413	1.17	−2.61	0	±0
Left Municipal Platform (PME)	159	0.45	New	0	±0
United People's Assembly (APU)	101	0.29	New	0	±0
Blank ballots	459	1.30	+0.19		
Total	35,354			25	±0
Valid votes	35,354	99.59	+0.31		
Invalid votes	146	0.41	−0.31		
Votes cast / turnout	35,500	51.98	−6.95		
Abstentions	32,790	48.02	+6.95		
Registered voters	68,290				
Sources
Footnotes: ^{1} People's Party results are compared to People's Alliance totals in the 1987 election.; ^{2} Galician Nationalist Convergence results are compared to Galician Progressive Coalition totals in the 1987 election.

=== Lugo ===
Population: 81,493

← Summary of the 26 May 1991 City Council of Lugo election results →
Parties and alliances	Popular vote			Seats	
Parties and alliances	Votes	%	±pp	Total	+/−
People's Party (PP)^{1}	16,231	41.47	+12.78	12	+3
Socialists' Party of Galicia (PSdeG–PSOE)	9,616	24.57	+3.65	7	+1
Galician Nationalist Convergence (CG–CdG)^{2}	3,926	10.03	−17.90	3	−6
Galician Nationalist Bloc (BNG)	2,880	7.36	+4.43	2	+2
United Left (EU)	2,298	5.87	+4.28	1	+1
Galicianist Party (PG)	1,557	3.98	+0.62	0	±0
The Greens of Galicia (OVG)	1,000	2.56	New	0	±0
Democratic and Social Centre (CDS)	601	1.54	−3.89	0	−1
Galician Socialist Party–Galician Left (PSG–EG)	521	1.33	−0.65	0	±0
Blank ballots	507	1.30	+0.33		
Total	39,137			25	±0
Valid votes	39,137	99.48	+0.82		
Invalid votes	206	0.52	−0.82		
Votes cast / turnout	39,343	58.68	−3.94		
Abstentions	27,699	41.32	+3.94		
Registered voters	67,042				
Sources
Footnotes: ^{1} People's Party results are compared to People's Alliance totals in the 1987 election.; ^{2} Galician Nationalist Convergence results are compared to Galician Progressive Coalition totals in the 1987 election.

=== Ourense ===
Population: 109,283

← Summary of the 26 May 1991 City Council of Ourense election results →
Parties and alliances	Popular vote			Seats	
Parties and alliances	Votes	%	±pp	Total	+/−
Socialists' Party of Galicia (PSdeG–PSOE)	17,367	36.42	+7.19	12	+2
People's Party (PP)^{1}	15,114	31.70	−1.76	10	−1
Centrist Convergence–Democratic and Social Centre (CC–CDS)^{2}	5,441	11.41	−0.09	3	±0
Galician Nationalist Bloc (BNG)	3,022	6.34	+3.62	2	+2
Galicianist Party (PG)	1,654	3.47	New	0	±0
United Left (EU)	1,413	2.96	+0.49	0	±0
Independent Socialists of Orense (SI–OR)	1,347	2.82	New	0	±0
Independent Electors' Group of Orense (ADEI–O)^{3}	726	1.52	−0.89	0	±0
Galician Socialist Party–Galician Left (PSG–EG)	614	1.29	−1.68	0	±0
The Greens (OV)	198	0.42	New	0	±0
Galician People's Front (FPG)	152	0.32	New	0	±0
The Greens Ecologist–Humanist List (LVLE–H)^{4}	130	0.27	+0.03	0	±0
Independents of Galicia (IG)	n/a	n/a	−9.58	0	−3
Blank ballots	507	1.06	−0.09		
Total	47,685			27	±0
Valid votes	47,685	99.24	+0.61		
Invalid votes	366	0.76	−0.61		
Votes cast / turnout	48,051	56.23	+1.75		
Abstentions	37,403	43.77	−1.75		
Registered voters	85,454				
Sources
Footnotes: ^{1} People's Party results are compared to People's Alliance totals in the 1987 election.; ^{2} Centrist Convergence–Democratic and Social Centre results are compared to the combined totals of Galician Progressive Coalition and Democratic and Social Centre in the 1987 election.; ^{3} Independent Electors' Group of Orense results are compared to Group of Independents of Orense totals in the 1987 election.; ^{4} The Greens Ecologist–Humanist List results are compared to Humanist Platform totals in the 1987 election.

=== Pontevedra ===
Population: 70,356

← Summary of the 26 May 1991 City Council of Pontevedra election results →
Parties and alliances	Popular vote			Seats	
Parties and alliances	Votes	%	±pp	Total	+/−
People's Party (PP)^{1}	12,238	40.01	+19.48	12	+6
Socialists' Party of Galicia (PSdeG–PSOE)	6,851	22.40	−0.46	6	±0
Galician Nationalist Bloc (BNG)	4,135	13.52	+8.42	4	+3
Galician Nationalist Convergence (CG–CdG)	3,261	10.66	New	3	+3
United Pontevedra (PU)	1,406	4.60	New	0	±0
Galician Socialist Party–Galician Left (PSG–EG)	1,142	3.73	−0.29	0	±0
Democratic and Social Centre (CDS)	702	2.30	−5.66	0	−2
United Left (EU)	305	1.00	+0.29	0	±0
Left Neighbour Platform (PVE)	98	0.32	New	0	±0
Galicianist Party (PG)	80	0.26	−0.03	0	±0
Independents of Galicia (IG)	n/a	n/a	−33.37	0	−10
Blank ballots	366	1.20	+0.30		
Total	30,584			25	±0
Valid votes	30,584	99.21	+0.02		
Invalid votes	245	0.79	−0.02		
Votes cast / turnout	30,829	59.17	−6.03		
Abstentions	21,275	40.83	+6.03		
Registered voters	52,104				
Sources
Footnotes: ^{1} People's Party results are compared to People's Alliance totals in the 1987 election.; ^{2} Centrist Convergence–Democratic and Social Centre results are compared to the combined totals of Galician Progressive Coalition and Democratic and Social Centre in the 1987 election.; ^{3} The Greens Ecologist–Humanist List results are compared to Humanist Platform totals in the 1987 election.

=== Santiago de Compostela ===
Population: 91,419

← Summary of the 26 May 1991 City Council of Santiago de Compostela election results →
Parties and alliances	Popular vote			Seats	
Parties and alliances	Votes	%	±pp	Total	+/−
Socialists' Party of Galicia (PSdeG–PSOE)	17,527	42.52	+3.25	13	±0
People's Party (PP)^{1}	15,813	38.36	+7.64	11	+1
Galician Nationalist Bloc (BNG)	2,267	5.50	+1.90	1	+1
Galician Socialist Party–Galician Left (PSG–EG)	1,568	3.80	−0.74	0	±0
Democratic and Social Centre (CDS)	1,347	3.27	−4.64	0	−2
United Left (EU)	735	1.78	−0.45	0	±0
Galician Nationalist Convergence (CG–CdG)^{2}	572	1.39	−1.99	0	±0
Unitary Neighbour Platform (PVU)	376	0.91	New	0	±0
The Greens (OV)	285	0.69	New	0	±0
Galician People's Front (FPG)	133	0.32	New	0	±0
The Ecologists (LE)	91	0.22	New	0	±0
United People's Assembly (APU)	60	0.15	New	0	±0
Blank ballots	450	1.09	+0.09		
Total	41,224			25	±0
Valid votes	41,224	99.57	+0.77		
Invalid votes	178	0.43	−0.77		
Votes cast / turnout	41,402	59.98	−0.60		
Abstentions	27,627	40.02	+0.60		
Registered voters	69,029				
Sources
Footnotes: ^{1} People's Party results are compared to People's Alliance totals in the 1987 election.; ^{2} Galician Nationalist Convergence results are compared to Galician Progressive Coalition totals in the 1987 election.

=== Vigo ===
Population: 279,986

← Summary of the 26 May 1991 City Council of Vigo election results →
Parties and alliances	Popular vote			Seats	
Parties and alliances	Votes	%	±pp	Total	+/−
People's Party (PP)^{1}	51,776	41.81	+11.30	13	+4
Socialists' Party of Galicia (PSdeG–PSOE)	46,722	37.73	+2.53	11	±0
Galician Socialist Party–Galician Left (PSG–EG)	9,511	7.68	−8.99	2	−3
Galician Nationalist Bloc (BNG)	6,217	5.02	+3.17	1	+1
United Left (EU)	2,695	2.18	+0.69	0	±0
Democratic and Social Centre (CDS)	1,837	1.48	−7.27	0	−2
Galician Nationalist Convergence (CG–CdG)^{2}	1,072	0.87	−0.01	0	±0
Left Neighbour Platform (PVE)	886	0.72	New	0	±0
The Greens Ecologist–Humanist List (LVLE–H)^{3}	824	0.67	+0.43	0	±0
Independents of Vigo Coalition (CIV)	560	0.45	New	0	±0
United People's Assembly (APU)	137	0.11	New	0	±0
Blank ballots	1,589	1.28	+0.45		
Total	123,826			27	±0
Valid votes	123,826	99.52	+0.31		
Invalid votes	598	0.48	−0.31		
Votes cast / turnout	124,424	58.94	−5.79		
Abstentions	86,662	41.06	+5.79		
Registered voters	211,086				
Sources
Footnotes: ^{1} People's Party results are compared to People's Alliance totals in the 1987 election.; ^{2} Galician Nationalist Convergence results are compared to Galician Progressive Coalition totals in the 1987 election.; ^{3} The Greens Ecologist–Humanist List results are compared to Humanist Platform totals in the 1987 election.
