= Galician Progressive Coalition =

Galician Progressive Coalition Coalición Progresista Galega
- Founded: 1987
- Dissolved: 1991
- Merger of: Galician Coalition; People's Democratic Party; Liberal Party
- Political position: Centre to centre-right

Galician Progressive Coalition (Galician: Coalición Progresista Galega, CPG) was a centre-right Galician political coalition formed for the municipal elections of 1987.

== Member parties ==
- Galician Coalition
- People's Democratic Party
- Liberal Party

== History ==
=== Coalition ===
CPG was born after the rupture of People's Coalition in Galicia. The smaller parties of the former coalition joined the Galician nationalist party Galician Coalition, that had just suffered the split of the Galician Nationalist Party. CPG was the third most voted party in the elections, with very good results in the Province of A Coruña. In total, the coalition won 54 mayors and 610 local seats.

== Election results ==
=== Local councils ===
Local councils
Election	Spain			Galicia		
Election	Votes	%	Seats won	Votes	%	Seats won
1987	148,436	0.76	610 / 65,577	148,436	10.98	610 / 4,044
