= Galician Nationalist Party–Galicianist Party =

Galician Nationalist Party–Galicianist Party Partido Nacionalista Galego–Partido Galeguista
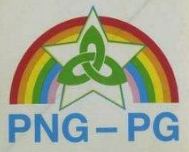
- Leader: Xosé Mosquera Casero
- Founded: 1987
- Dissolved: 2012
- Merger of: Galician Nationalist Party; Nationalist Galicianist Party
- Merged into: Commitment to Galicia
- Youth wing: Mocidades Galeguistas
- Ideology: Liberalism; Galician nationalism Progressivism; Social liberalism
- Political position: Centre

The Galician Nationalist Party–Galicianist Party (Galician: Partido Nacionalista Galego–Partido Galeguista, PNG–PG) was a Galician nationalist and liberal political party, coming from a split of the Galician Coalition. The PNG–PG had 132 members in 2002 (the party had more than 500 shortly after its founding). Xosé Mosquera Casero was the last secretary general, after the VIII Congress in September 2011. The party merged with Commitment to Galicia in 2012.

== History ==
Founded in January 1987 as the Galician Nationalist Party (PNG) when a sector of the Galician Coalition, led by Pablo González Mariñas and Xosé Henrique Rodríguez Peña promoted a more progressive and nationalist organization. The PNG was joined the same year by the small Partido Galeguista (Nationalist), leading to the creation of the PNG–PG. In September 1987, the PNG–PG supported a motion against the Galician president Xerardo Fernández Albor, that led to the fall of the government. The party entered the new socialist government of Fernando González Laxe taking control of two consellerías (autonic ministers).

In 1987 and 1989 participated in the elections to the European Parliament together with Eusko Alkartasuna and the Republican Left of Catalonia without obtaining representation.

Due to the poor results of the elections of 1989 the PNG–PG joined the Galician Nationalist Bloc. After IX National Congress, on 18 March 2012, the party decided to leave the BNG. In late March of that year the party announced that they were working on a common project of a Galician nationalist centre party, along with Terra Galega (TEGA), Alternativa Popular Galega (APG), Converxencia XXI (CXXI) and the Partido Galeguista Demócrata (PGD). The project did not materialize. After that the PNG-PG joined Compromiso por Galicia.

== Elections ==
Election	Votes	%	Seats
European Parliament election, 1987	18,354	1.00	0 / 60
1987 local elections	18,354	1.36	38 / 4,044
European Parliament election, 1989	12,906	1.38	0 / 60
1989 Galician parliamentary election	18,036	1.36	0 / 75
1989 Spanish general election	14,411	1.08	0 / 350
1991 local elections	4,773	0.34	3 / 4,033
