= Camilo Nogueira Román =

Spanish politician (born 1936)

Camilo Nogueira
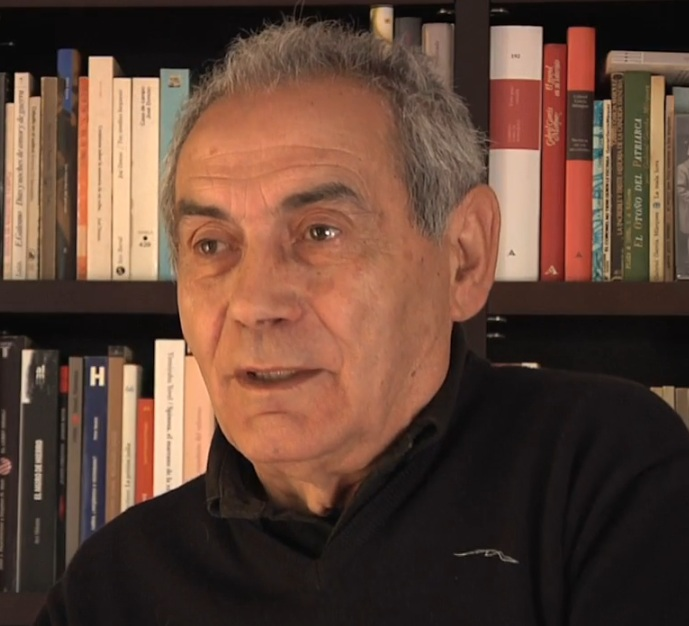

Member of the European Parliament
- In office 20 July 1999 – 19 July 2004

Personal details
- Born: Camilo Nogueira Román; November 22, 1936 (age 89) Lavadores, Galicia, Spain
- Party: Galician Nationalist Bloc
- Profession: Economist, Engineer

Camilo Nogueira Román (born 22 November 1936) is a Spanish politician and engineer. He was a Member of the European Parliament between 1999 and 2004. He was part of the Galician Nationalist Bloc (BNG) and the Democratic Party of the Peoples of Europe, which took part in the Greens–European Free Alliance.

Nogueira finished his studies in industrial engineering in 1964, and graduated with a degree in economics in 1975. He worked as an engineer for Citroën in Vigo between 1964 and 1972. After that he became the Projects and Development Director of the Society for the Industrial Development of Galicia (SODIGA) between 1973 and 1987. Nogueira has always been actively involved in politics.

As a politician, he was a member of the executive board of the Galician People's Union (UPG) from 1970–1977. He split from the UPG during the Spanish transition to democracy and became founding member and leader of the Galician Workers' Party (POG). The Galician Workers' Party dissolved itself into the Galician Left (EG), which he led throughout its existence from 1980 to 1984. After the Galician Left fused with the Galician Socialist Party he became a member of the executive board of the resulting Galician Socialist Party–Galician Left (PSG-EG) from 1984 to 1996. He was the leader of Unidade Galega (Galician Unity), a political alliance which eventually integrated in the Galician Nationalist Bloc (BNG) coalition. He was a member of the executive board of BNG from 1996 to 1999.

At present he is member of the municipal council of his birth city of Vigo and Deputy in the Galician Parliament representing the BNG.

Nogueira is author of a number of publications on economics and politics in connection with the "Galician Question" (issues related to or having to do with Galicia).

In European Parliament, Camilo Nogueira was very active. His posts while he was a member of the European Parliament were:

- Committee on Regional Policy, Transport and Tourism, Member
- Committee on Constitutional Affairs, Substitute
- Committee on Fisheries, Substitute
- Delegation for relations with the United States, Member

Nogueira made headlines when, following the example of José Posada, he made his oral and written communications in Galician at the European chamber, and this was accepted as a variety of Portuguese. Since then, he has been considered a reintegrationist and was offered honorary membership of the AGAL (Galician Association of the Language), which he accepted.
