= Association for the Ecological Defense of Galicia =

Galician ecological group

ADEGA
- Purpose: Environmentalism; Human rights Defence of the rural areas.
- Region served: Galicia, Spain
- Members: 14 comarcal groups
- Website: adega.gal/web/portada.php

The Asociación para a Defensa Ecolóxica de Galiza (English: Association for the Ecological Defense of Galicia) is a Galician ecological group founded in 1974 and registered in 1976. ADEGA has always been linked with the Galician nationalist movement. The organization has chapters in the comarcas of A Mariña, Santiago, Coruña, Costa da Morte, Lugo, O Carballiño, Ourense, A Paradanta, Barbanza, Ordes, A Ulloa, Pontevedra, Trasancos, and Vigo.

== History ==
Domingo Quiroga was the first president of the association. The first board of directors included: Francisco Bermejo, Professor of Analytical Chemistry; Xosé Bar Boo, architect; Xosé Luis Rodríguez Pardo, lawyer; Xosé Manuel Beiras, national spokesman of the Galician Nationalist Bloc for many years; and Fernando González Laxe, president of the Xunta de Galicia between 1987 and 1989.

The organization gained prominence participating in the anti-nuclear movement against the construction of a nuclear power plant in the municipality of Xove. After a series of mass protests, plans to build the plant were ultimately abandoned. ADEGA again gained international attention in the 1980s for a campaign against the dumping of radioactive materials in the Atlantic, in collaboration with other organizations including Greenpeace. The campaign managed to block the dumping by putting Galician fishing boats alongside the boats carrying the nuclear waste. The fire aboard the cargo vessel Cason, which caused a toxic cloud in Costa da Morte, sparked another campaign by ADEGA. In the late 1980s ADEGA also led successful campaigns against the building of new dams on the Eume and Navia rivers. The organization's activities have since diversified, to address numerous environmental problems. ADEGA also has a very important presence in social movements like Nunca Máis and, more recently, in the movement against mining that stopped the Corcoesto gold mine in the municipality of Coristanco.

Since 1986, ADEGA has published a quarterly magazine called Cerna, dealing with environmental global problems and their impact on Galicia. Since 2004 ADEGA has promoted the Proxecto Ríos (Project Rivers), an educational and citizens' initiative in defense of the Galician rivers under which volunteers conduct inspections, make an annual report, and hold conferences and cleaning campaigns when necessary in a river that passes through their municipality.

In 2005, Verdegaia was founded as an offshoot of ADEGA. ADEGA was criticized by Galiza non se vende (Galicia is not for sale), a network of social movements that has organized a series of mass protests since 2007, for its excessive dependence on the UPG and BNG.
