= Galician Left =

Galician Left Esquerda Galega
- Leader: Camilo Nogueira
- Founded: 1 December 1980
- Dissolved: 24 June 1984
- Ideology: Galician nationalism Left-wing nationalism Democratic socialism Ecologism; Pacifism

Galician Left (EG, Esquerda Galega in Galician language) was a Galician nationalist and leftist political party of Galicia.

== History ==
It was founded in December 1980 as a refoundation of the Galician Workers Party, integrating the majority of the members of the self-dissolved Galician Workers Party and members of the BN-PG, Galician Socialist Party, Communist Party of Galicia and the Communist Movement of Galicia. The party celebrated its First Congress in March 1981, accepting the constitutional framework and the autonomous institutions as a valid framework to achieve the self-determination of Galicia.

In the Galician elections of 1981 EG obtained 33,497 votes (3.32%) and a seat for its leader, Camilo Nogueira, who achieved great prominence in the Galician Parliament, although the party suffered a sharp setback in the 1982 general elections with only 22,310 votes (1.72%).

In 1984 the party merged with the Galician Socialist Party to create the Galician Socialist Party-Galician Left (PSG-EG).

== Elections ==
Election	Votes	%	Seats
Galician parliamentary election, 1981	33,497	3.32%	1 / 71
Spanish general election, 1982	22,310	1.57%	0 / 350
Spanish municipal elections, 1983	19,173	1.57%	22 / 4,033
