= Gerardo Fernández Albor =

Spanish physician

- Fernández in 1994

President of the Regional Government of Galicia
- In office 13 January 1982 – 23 September 1987
- Monarch: Juan Carlos I
- Preceded by: Xosé Quiroga Suárez
- Succeeded by: Fernando González Laxe
Parliamentary offices
Member of the Parliament of Galicia
In office 20 October 1981 – 25 July 1989
Constituency	A Coruña
Member of the European Parliament for Spain
In office 25 July 1989 – 19 July 1999

Personal details
- Born: 7 September 1917 Santiago de Compostela, A Coruña, Spain
- Died: 12 July 2018 (aged 100) Santiago de Compostela, Galicia, Spain
- Party: People's Party (from 1989); People's Alliance (until 1989); Galician Unity (1979–1980)

Gerardo Fernández Albor (Galician: Xerardo Fernández Albor; 7 September 1917 – 12 July 2018) was a Spanish politician who served as President of the Regional Government of Galicia from 1982 to 1987. A conservative, he was the first president of the government under Galicia's statute of autonomy. He later served as a member of the European Parliament from 1989 to 1999.

== Biography ==
Fernández Albor, a physician by profession, went to university in Santiago de Compostela prior to the outbreak of the Spanish Civil War. He later went to Germany, where he took piloting courses under the supervision of the Luftwaffe. In the late 1970s, he was a member of Galician Unity.

In 1981, following a proposal from Manuel Fraga, leader of the People's Alliance, Fernández Albor agreed to run as a candidate for president of the Xunta de Galicia in the party's electoral list for the 1981 Galician regional election. The party defeated the Union of the Democratic Centre at the election, with 26 seats in parliament, and Fernández Albor was subsequently elected president by the new parliament.

In 1987, he was defeated in a constructive vote of no confidence which resulted in Fernando González Laxe of the Socialists' Party of Galicia succeeding him as president of the government.

Fernández Albor turned 100 on 7 September 2017. Less than a year later, he died in Santiago de Compostela on 12 July 2018. The government of Galicia declared three days of official mourning following his death. He was married to Asunción Baltar Tojo, who died on 2 August 2022.

== Honours ==
- Knight Grand Cross of the Order of Isabella the Catholic (5 March 2012)
- Recipient of the Medal of Merit in Labour in Gold (12 June 2017)
- Knight Grand Cross of the Order of Charles III (posthumous) (23 December 2025)
