= Galician National-Popular Bloc =

Galician National-Popular Bloc Bloque Nacional-Popular Galego
- Leader: Lois Diéguez; Bautista Álvarez
- Founded: 1977
- Dissolved: 1982
- Merger of: UPG and the AN-PG
- Succeeded by: Galician Nationalist Bloc
- Student wing: Galician Revolutionary Students
- Peasant wing: Sindicato Labrego Galego
- Ideology: Galician nationalism Revolutionary socialism Sovereignism; Left-wing nationalism
- Union affiliation: INTG
- Parliament of Galicia (1981–1982): 2 / 71
- Provincial deputations of Galicia (1979-1982): 3 / 105
- Town councillors (1979–1982): 258 / 4,069

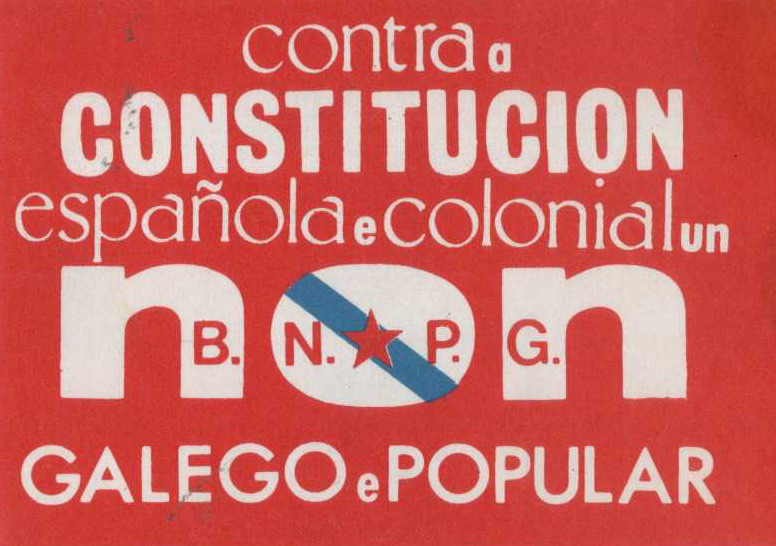
BN-PG sticker against the 1978 Spanish Constitution, supporting NO in the Spanish constitutional referendum of 1978. It says: Against the Spanish and colonial Constitution a Galician and popular NO

The Galician National-Popular Bloc (BNPG or BN-PG, Bloque Nacional-Popular Galego in Galician language) was a Galician electoral candidacy. It had as the national sovereignty for Galiza as its main objective and as an alternative to autonomism. It was formed by the Galician People's Union (UPG) and Galician National-Popular Assembly (ANPG).

== History ==
The candidacy was boosted by the UPG and was created as a group of voters to stand in the general election of 1977, since both the UPG and the AN-PG were not legal. In these elections the BN-PG obtained 22,771 votes, 2.02% of the votes in Galiza.

BN-PG organized numerous protests over a variety of issues (self-determination, ecologist causes, normalization of the Galician language, international solidarity, amnesty, ...). Among the biggest were the traditional demonstrations in the National Day of Galicia, were the BN-PG usually convocated large crowds. The biggest one was the 1978 demonstration, with around 35.000 protestors (according to Europa Press).

The party was heavily linked to the Intersindical Nacional Galega (industrial and services workers) and Sindicato Labrego Galego (peasants) unions and to a series of mass social movements and platforms, like the ecologist ADEGA.

The candidacy, already as a coalition, repeated in the general election of 1979, in which obtained 60,889 votes and the 5.95% of the votes in Galiza. In neither of the two elections the BN-PG won any parliamentary representation. In the municipal elections of 1979 it reached its electoral ceiling, obtaining the 7.1% of the Galician vote and gained representation in a lot of Galician municipalities (including five of the seven major municipalities in Galiza), with a total of 253 town councillors.

The BN-PG called to vote "no" for both the Spanish Constitution of 1978 and the Statute of Autonomy of Galicia.

In the Galician parliamentary elections of 1981 the BN-PG presented a joint list with the Galician Socialist Party (PSG). The coalition won 61,870 votes (6.15%), which resulted in 3 seats (1 for A Coruña, another Lugo and another one for Pontevedra). Two corresponded to BNPG and the remaining one for the PSG.

In 1982 the BN-PG became the Galician Nationalist Bloc.

== Electoral results ==
Election	Year	Votes	%	Seats	Mayors
General elections	1977	22,771	2.02	0 / 350	
General elections	1979	60,889	5.95	0 / 350	
Local elections	1979	78,216	7.32	258 / 4,072	9 / 313
Galician parliament (Note: In a coalition with the Galician Socialist Party that won 3 seats.)	1981	61,870	6.27	2 / 71	
General elections	1982	38,437	2.97	0 / 350	

The electoral results of the bloc varied over years. In the first elections the result was weaker than expected, but the bad result didn't cause any internal crisis in the bloc, since it was more focused in street protest and workers and peasant struggles than electoral politics. In 1979 there were both local and general elections, with the BN-PG gaining better results, and stabilizing in a 6-7% of the vote until the general elections of 1982, in which the front lost numerous votes to the PSOE of Felipe González.

The strongholds of the party were either industrial towns or rural areas with a strong presence of the Sindicato Labrego Galego (SLG). In the province of A Coruña the bloc tended to have its best results in the metro area of Ferrol and in the Eume comarca, specially in Fene (11.95% of the vote in the general elections of 1979) and As Pontes de García Rodríguez (13.64% in the same elections). In the Province of Lugo the BN-PG was stronger in the eastern area, specially in the Ancares mountains, were the SLG was very active. The results were particularly high in Becerreá (18.01%), Castroverde (27.84%) Pedrafita do Cebreiro (37.15%), Ribeira de Piquín (15.93%), As Nogais (33.67%) and Navia de Suarna (19.92%). In the Province of Ourense the BN-PG had its main bases of support in the Allariz - Maceda comarca, specially in the municipalities of Allariz (14.71%), Maceda (19.02%) and Baños de Molgas (12.8%) and Montederramo (14.94%). In the Province of Pontevedra O Morrazo and the whole Ría de Vigo were the main stronghold of the "national-populars".

In the local elections of 1979 the bloc gained 258 town councillors and 9 mayors (out of 313). The towns that had a BN-PG mayor in the 1979–1982 were: Ourol, Pedrafita do Cebreiro, Bueu, Fene, Láncara, Moaña, As Nogais, Ribeira de Piquín, Bóveda and Corcubión (1980-1982, the mayor was elected in the lists of the Party of Labour of Spain (PTE), but after the disapparition of this party in 1980 the local PTE assembly joined the BN-PG).
