= Galician Socialist Party (1963) =

Galician Socialist Party Partido Socialista Galego
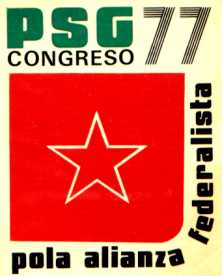
- Secretary-General: Xosé Manuel Beiras
- Founded: 1963
- Dissolved: 1984
- Merged into: PSG-EG; BNG
- Membership (1979): 650
- Ideology: Democratic socialism Galician nationalism Marxism; Federalism
- Political position: Left-wing
- Trade union affiliation: Intersindical Nacional dos Traballadores Galegos (INTG)
- Parliament of Galicia (1981) (Note: In a coalition with the Galician National-Popular Bloc.): 1 / 71
- Local seats (1983): 22 / 4,033

The Galician Socialist Party (Partido Socialista Galego, in Galician language) was a socialist and Galician nationalist political party active in Galicia.

== History ==
=== Foundation ===
Founded on 23 August 1963 with the intention of forming a nationalist and social democratic party in Galiza, subsequently radicalized its positions, approaching the communist Galician People's Union (UPG). Among its founders stand out Mario Orxajes Pita, Salvador Rei, Salvador García Bodaño, Xosé Luís Rodríguez Pardo, Cesáreo Saco, Manuel Caamaño and Ramón Piñeiro, that created the party in a clandestine meeting.

The new party attracted former members of the Partido Galeguista as Francisco Fernández del Riego, who was elected party president, Luis Viñas Cortegoso, Amado Losada, Domingo Pombo and young influenced by Ramón Piñeiro like Xosé Manuel Beiras or Ramón Lugrís.

=== Francoism ===
In 1966 the party started publishing Adiante (Forward, in Galician language) magazine in Perpignan, that since 1969 was published in Galiza named Galicia Socialista. In 1972 the PSG selected Xosé Manuel Beiras as the party general secretary. This led the PSG to an ideological radicalization and to an increase of its membership. The PSG accepts the theory of internal colonialism and marxism. In 1974 the PSG participates in the Iberian Socialist Conference (CSI), with the PSOE, the Socialist Movement of Catalonia (MSC), the Socialist Party of the Valencian Country (PSPV) and the Unión Sindical Obrera (USO). In 1976 the PSG, MSC, PSPV and the USO broke with the PSOE and formed the Federation of Socialist Parties (FPS). In 1975 the Galician Socialist Movement joined the PSG.

=== Transition ===
The poor results of the general elections of 1977 and the PSOE pressures caused the rupture of the FPS, and the PSG entered in a severe crisis. Xosé Manuel Beiras left the party leadership and some supporters wanted to approach to the PSOE. This group organized the Socialist Collective-PSG led by Xosé Luis Rodríguez Pardo, Ceferino Díaz and Fernando González Laxe, that had around 100 militants. The direction opted to expel this group from the PSG. After the expulsion they joined the PSOE.

The PSG participated in the Galician Unity (UG) coalition to take part in the general and local elections in 1979, but unlike the other member parties of UG, refused to join the Committee of the 16, which had to prepare the draft for the Statute of Autonomy.

At the Second Congress in June 1980 the possibility to merge with the Galician Workers Party was discarded, but the creation of the Mesa de Forzas Políticas Galegas with the Galician National-Popular Bloc was approved. This decision to approach the BNPG caused a strong discontent within the PSG and many militants left the party after this congress.

For the elections of 1981, the PSG made an electoral coalition with the BNPG. Of the three members elected, Claudio González Garrido was a member of the PSG. When the BNG was formed, the PSG joined the new front, but in 1983 decided to leave. This decision led to the disintegration of the party: one part entered the BNG as the Socialist Collective and the rest, led by Domingos Merino, merged with the Galician Left in 1984 to form the PSG-EG.

== Membership ==
The PSG was a party of cadres. Until 1975 it did not exceed 100 members, and reached 650 in 1980.

== Electoral results ==
Election	Year	Votes	%	Seats	Mayors
General elections	1977	27,197	2.41	0 / 350	
General elections (Note: In the Galician Unity coalition.)	1979	55,555	5.43	0 / 350	
Local elections (Note: In the Galician Unity coalition.)	1979	78,216	7.32	141 / 4,072	9 / 312
Galician parliament (Note: In a coalition with the Galician National-Popular Bloc that won 3 seats.)	1981	61,870	6.27	1 / 71	
General elections (Note: As part of the Galician Nationalist Bloc.)	1982	38,437	2.96	0 / 350	
Local elections	1983	7,084	0.58	21 / 4,033	1 / 312

== Gallery ==
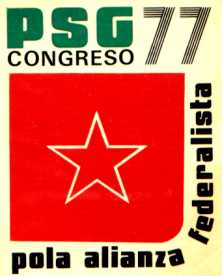
Poster of the 1977 congress of the PSG. The PSG never advocated for the independence of Galiza but defended a federation of the peoples of Spain.
