= Liberal Party (Spain, 1976) =

Liberal Party Partido Liberal
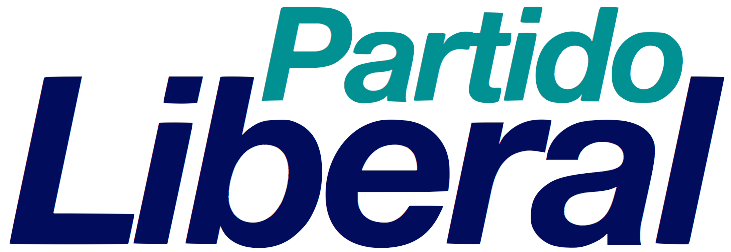
- Founder: Enrique Larroque
- Founded: 9 April 1976
- Dissolved: 15 March 1989
- Merged into: People's Party
- Ideology: Classical liberalism Conservative liberalism
- Political position: Centre-right
- National affiliation: People's Coalition (1983–1987)

The Liberal Party (Spanish: Partido Liberal; PL) was a liberal political party in Spain founded in 1976.

== History ==
The PL was initially scheduled to contest the 1977 Spanish general election within Adolfo Suárez's Union of the Democratic Centre (UCD) platform, but on 8 May 1977, the party announced that it would withdraw from the UCD and would not be contesting the upcoming election. It would then rejoin the UCD after the 1979 Spanish general election and until 1983, when it aligned itself with the People's Alliance (AP), the People's Democratic Party (PDP) and the Liberal Union (UL). On 22 December 1984, the latter merged into the Liberal Party. These three parties formed the People's Coalition for the 1986 election.

In 1989, the party, along with AP and PDP, merged to form the new People's Party (PP).

Esperanza Aguirre, now a leading PP figure, was a Liberal member.

== Electoral performance ==
=== Cortes Generales ===
Cortes Generales
Election	Leading candidate	Congress			Senate			Gov.
Election	Leading candidate	Votes	%	Seats	Votes	%	Seats	Gov.
1979	Enrique Larroque	15,774	0.1 (#30)	0 / 350	110,347	0.2 (#25)	0 / 208	—
1982	Manuel Fraga	Within AP–PDP		2 / 350	Within AP–PDP		0 / 208	No
1986	Manuel Fraga	Within AP–PDP–PL		12 / 350	Within AP–PDP–PL		8 / 208	No
