= Communist Party of Galicia =

Communist Part of Galicia Partido Comunista de Galicia
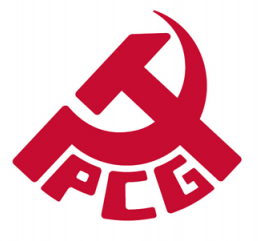
- Secretary-General: Jorge Crego
- Founded: 1968
- Newspaper: A Voz do Pobo
- Youth wing: Xuventude Comunista Galega (XC)
- Ideology: Communism; Galicianism; Republicanism; Revolutionary socialism
- National affiliation: Communist Party of Spain; United Left
- Colors: Red
- Congreso de los Diputados (Galician seats): 1 / 23 Within Unidas Podemos
- Spanish Senate (Galician seats): 0 / 18
- Parliament of Galicia: 0 / 75

Website
- www.pcgalicia.org

The Communist Party of Galicia (Galician: Partido Comunista de Galicia, PCG), is the affiliate of the Communist Party of Spain in Galicia.

== History ==
It was founded by Santiago Álvarez Gómez (1913–2002). During the late years of Francoism and the Spanish democratic transition the party lost influence, with some sectors of its traditional social base joining the Spanish Socialist Workers' Party (PSOE) or the Galician People's Union (UPG).

In the local elections of 1979 the party gained 70 town councillors and 3 mayors (Cangas do Morrazo, O Grove and Mugardos). In the Galician elections of 1981 the PCG won a seat in the Parliament of Galicia for the Province of A Coruña. In 1985 the party lost its representation in parliament, not gaining any seat again until the Galician elections of 2012, when the coalition Galician Left Alternative won 9 deputies (5 - later 4 - of them were PCG members):

Eva Solla, elected in 2014 an in charge until 2022, was the first woman to lead the party

== Election results ==
Year and type of election	Votes	Percentage	Deputies/Town councillors
1977 Spanish legislative election	34,188	3.03	0
1979 Spanish municipal elections	48,482	4.53	70
1979 Spanish legislative election	42,594	4.16	0
1981 Galician parliamentary election	28,927	2.93	1
