= People's Coalition (Spain) =

Defunct Spanish electoral coalition

People's Coalition Coalición Popular
- Leader: Manuel Fraga
- Founded: 13 September 1982 (Note: As People's Alliance–People's Democratic Party); 2 March 1983 (Note: As People's Coalition)
- Dissolved: 19 January 1987
- Preceded by: Democratic Coalition
- Succeeded by: People's Party
- Headquarters: Madrid
- Ideology: Conservatism; Christian democracy
- Political position: Centre-right to right-wing
- Colors: Blue; Orange

The People's Coalition (Spanish: Coalición Popular) was a Spanish political coalition comprising national and regional right-wing parties to contest various general, regional and municipal elections between 1983 and 1987.

== History ==
The coalition precedents date back to the 1982 general election, when the "People's Coalition" had not yet been formalized and the force was known simply as AP–PDP, using the initials of the political parties that had formed it: the People's Alliance (AP) and the People's Democratic Party (PDP). Both parties joined to contest together the October 1982 general election, for which both of them signed a coalition agreement on 13 September 1982 jointly with regionalist parties Navarrese People's Union (UPN), Regionalist Aragonese Party (PAR) and Valencian Union (UV), as well as with the Union of the Democratic Centre (UCD) in the Basque Country.

The first time that the term People's Coalition was coined was during the first months of 1983, ahead of the municipal and regional elections of 8 May 1983. Coalition members AP and PDP, as well as the Liberal Union (UL) and regionalists UPN, PAR and UV, formed a coordinating committee of parties on 2 March of that year.

After the 1986 election, the PDP left the coalition to contest the regional and local elections of 1987 on its own, with its deputies in the Congress of Deputies leaving the People's Group and joining the Mixed Group on 15 July 1986. After that, in 1988 it was renamed as Christian Democracy, led by Javier Rupérez, and merged into the People's Party (PP) in 1989, like AP, PL and CdG. The pact between AP and PDP was formally scrapped on 21 July 1986, although the agreements for the regional the governments of Cantabria, Galicia and the Balearic Islands lasted until 1989. On 19 January 1987, PL deputies left the People's Group in Congress and moved to the Mixed Group, thus putting an end to the People's Coalition.

== Member parties ==
Nationwide components:

- People's Alliance (AP)
- People's Democratic Party (PDP) (until 1986)
- Liberal Union (UL) (1983–84)
- Liberal Party (PL) (1983–87)

Regional components:

- Aragon: Regionalist Aragonese Party (PAR) (until 1983)
- Galicia: Centrists of Galicia (CdG) (from 1985)
- Navarre: Navarrese People's Union (UPN)
- Valencian Community: Valencian Union (UV) (until 1983)

== Electoral performance ==
=== Cortes Generales ===
Cortes Generales
Election	Leading candidate	Congress			Senate			Gov.
Election	Leading candidate	Votes	%	Seats	Votes	%	Seats	Gov.
1982	Manuel Fraga	5,548,107	26.4 (#2)	107 / 350	15,084,392	25.7 (#2)	54 / 208	No
1986	Manuel Fraga	5,247,677	26.0 (#2)	105 / 350	14,485,103	26.1 (#2)	63 / 208	No
