= Galician Unity =

Galician Unity Unidade Galega
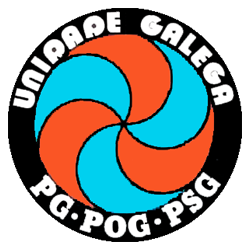
- Founded: 1979
- Dissolved: 1980
- Ideology: Galician nationalism Progressivism; Factions: Galician autonomy Federalism; Socialism; Social democracy Social liberalism Marxism
- Political position: Centre-left to left-wing
- Trade union affiliation: Central de Traballadores Galegos (CTG)
- Local seats (1979-1982): 141 / 4,072
- Provincial deputations of Galicia (1979-1982): 2 / 105

Galician Unity (Galician: Unidade Galega; UG) was a Galician nationalist and social democratic political coalition formed by the Galician Workers Party, Galician Socialist Party, and the Galicianist Party in 1979.

== History ==
The coalition aimed at promoting a degree of autonomy and self-governance of Galicia from Spain equal to that of Catalonia and the Basque Country, other autonomous communities of Spain. The coalition also promoted the adoption of a statute of autonomy for Galicia (like the 1978 Statute of Autonomy of the Basque Country and the 1979 Statute of Autonomy of Catalonia). This goal was achieved with the Galician Statute of Autonomy of 1981.

UG obtained more than 58,000 votes in the 1979 Spanish general election, but failed to gain any parliamentary representation in the Cortes Generales. In the municipal elections of 1979, UG candidate Domingos Merino was elected mayor of A Coruña, the second largest city of Galicia. UG candidates were also elected mayors in Cambados, Narón, Rairiz de Veiga, Redondela, As Pontes de García Rodríguez, Touro, Vilaboa and Malpica de Bergantiños.

Galician Unity was partially absorbed into the Bloque Nacionalista Galego in 1982.

== Elections ==
Election	Votes	%	Seats	Mayors
Spanish municipal elections, 1979	68,759	6.35%	141 / 4,072	9 / 312
Spanish general election, 1979	58,391	5.35%	0 / 350	-
