= Centrists of Galicia =

Defunct political party in Spain

Centrists of Galicia Centristas de Galicia
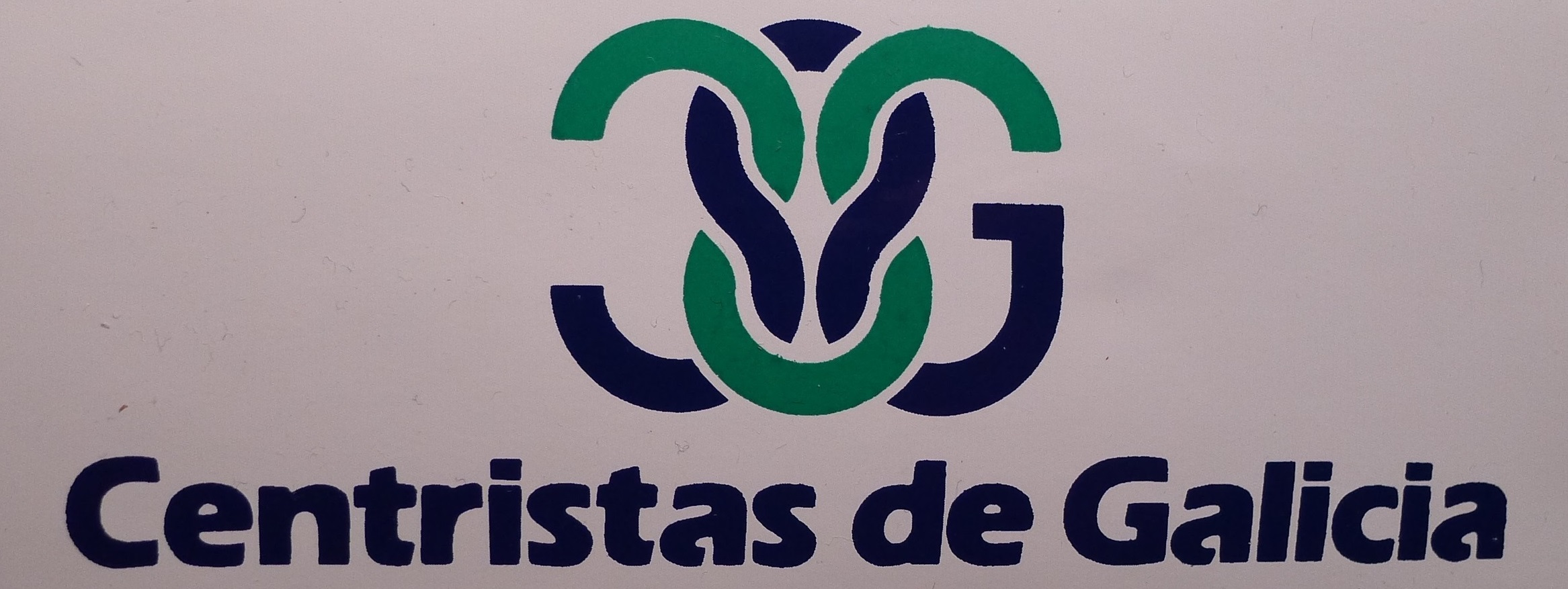
- Leader: Victorino Núñez Rodríguez
- Founded: 1985
- Dissolved: 1991
- Split from: Galician Coalition
- Merged into: People's Party
- Ideology: Galician nationalism Conservatism
- Political position: Centre-right

Centrists of Galicia (Spanish: Centristas de Galicia, CdG) was a political party in Galicia, based mainly in the province of Ourense between 1985 and 1991.

It emerged as a split from Galician Coalition, bringing together many provincial mayors of the province from the former Union of the Democratic Centre (UCD), who, after the disappearance of the UCD, formed Centrists of Ourense. It contested most elections jointly with the People's Alliance, except in the 1991 municipal elections, which it contested together with Galician Coalition under the Galician Nationalist Convergence label. In the province of Ourense it participated in coalition with the Democratic and Social Centre (CDS) under the name of Centrists of Galicia Convergence. That same year it joined the People's Party. Victorino Núñez and José Luis Baltar were its main leaders.
