= Galician Party of the Proletariat =

Defunct political party in Spain

Galician Party of the Proletariat Partido Galego do Proletariado
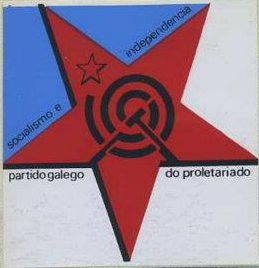
- Leader: Xosé Luís Méndez Ferrín; Luís Soto
- Founded: 1978
- Dissolved: 1980
- Newspaper: Sempre en Galiza
- Student wing: Galician Revolutionary Students (ERGA)
- Armed wing: Loita Armada Revolucionaria (LAR)
- Ideology: Galician independence Marxism-leninism; Socialism; Anti-imperialism
- Political position: Radical left
- National affiliation: Galiza Ceibe-OLN
- Trade union affiliation: Intersindical Nacional Galega (ING), Movimento Asambleario de Traballadores (MAT) and Intersindical Nacional dos Traballadores Galegos.
- Local seats in Galicia (1979-1980): 5 / 4,072

The Galician Party of the Proletariat (PGP) was a party galician independentist and Marxist-Leninist party formed in March 1978, as a continuation of Galician People's Union-Proletarian Line, a split of the original Galician People's Union. The Central Committee was clandestine, and even the party militants didn't know the members of it. The party supported armed struggle, which considered as anti-imperialist and anti-oligarchic. Its official magazine was called Sempre en Galiza.

== History ==
In 1979 Galician Unity included, as independent candidates, several militants of the PGP in their lists for the municipal elections. In those elections the PGP got three of its members elected as town councillors (Santiago de Compostela, Monforte de Lemos and Vilaboa). The PGP also constituted a platform that ran the elections in the municipality of Vigo and supported other lists, obtaining two town councillors in Salvaterra de Miño. The PGP also presented several lists, under the common name of Agrupación Electoral Galicia Ceibe in other towns, without gaining any representation.

After the local elections, the party formed Galiza Ceibe-OLN as its mass front and Loita Armada Revolucionaria as its armed wing. The emergence of Loita Armada Revolucionaria caused the police arrest in 1980 of several leaders of the organization, including Xosé Luís Méndez Ferrín. The party also had a remarkable influence in the Intersindical Nacional dos Traballadores Galegos.

The party dissolved in 1980.

== Sources ==
- Miguel Anxo Fernández Baz, A formación do nacionalismo galego contemporáneo (1963-1984), Santiago de Compostela, 2003.
