= Galiza Ceibe-OLN =

Galiza Ceibe-National Liberation Organization Galiza Ceibe-Organización de Liberación Nacional
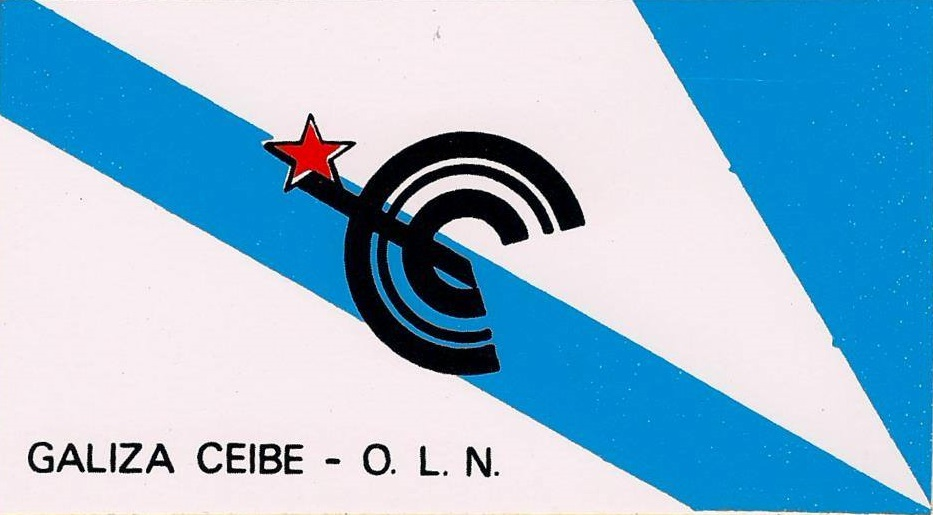
- Leader: Xosé Luís Méndez Ferrín
- Founded: 1979
- Dissolved: 1989
- Student wing: Galician Revolutionary Students (ERGA)
- Youth wing: Xerfas
- Ideology: Galician independence Socialism; Galician nationalism
- Political position: Left-wing
- National affiliation: Galician People's Front
- Trade union affiliation: Intersindical Nacional dos Traballadores Galegos (INTG)
- Colors: Red, white, blue
- Local seats in Galicia (1983–1987): 4 / 4,072

Galiza Ceibe-OLN (in English: Liberated Galiza-National Liberation Organization) was an independentist and socialist political party in Galicia, Spain. Galiza Ceibe was founded on 1980 by the Galician Party of the Proletariat (Partido Galego do Proletariado, PGP) as a political and electoral front, originally to present a list in Vigo and in other Galician municipalities under the name Agrupación Electoral Galicia Ceibe in the 1979 local elections.

== History ==
=== Foundation and dissolution of the PGP ===
The list gained 1,926 votes (2.22%) and no seats in Vigo and 2 town councillors in Salvaterra de Miño. In 1980 the PGP transformed Galiza Ceibe-OLN into a political party. In 1981 the PGP dissolved itself, and its militants joined Galiza Ceibe. Espiral was the party newspaper. The same year 16 Galician nationalists were arrested by police charged with membership of an armed band. Among the arrested were several members of Galiza Ceibe. The arrests led to protests and riots, with the participation of the Galician People's Union and the AN-PG. All the detainees were released between 1981 and 1983. In the 1980 autonomy referendum Galiza Ceibe supported both abstention and negative vote.

=== Alliances and electoral participation ===
In the autonomic elections of 1981 Galiza Ceibe and the PGP presented a candidacy to use the public media. The electoral campaign was used to support and raise awareness about the independentist prisoners and to call for abstention. At the end of the campaign the party announced its withdrawal from the elections. Despite the withdrawal and their calls for abstention, Galicia Ceibe gained 1,433 (0.15%) votes. The same year the organization called for a demonstration in Santiago de Compostela in the National Day of Galicia under the slogan Independencia e Socialismo (Independence and Socialism).

In 1982 it was one of the forces that founded the BNG but left the organization in the Constituent Assembly when the majority decided to participate in the general and autonomic elections.

In the elections of 1983 formed with the PCOE and independents the Popular Unity Candidates (Candidaturas de Unidade Popular), that presented lists in Vigo and Pontevedra. The party also supported and participated in the Unidade dos Viciños list in Melide, that gained 4 town councillors and the 26,71% of the vote (1,073 votes); and supported, but not participated, the Unión Galega list in Cambados (that gained 11 town councillors and the mayor) and the Agrupación Nacionalista Galega de Narón in Narón (6 town councillors and the mayor). Due to the poor results achieved Xosé Luís Méndez Ferrín proposed later this year in the VI National Assembly the dissolution of the organization, which was rejected by the majority. After that assembly part of the militancy left the organization. The National Assembly also decided to rename the organization as Galiza Ceive-OLN and adopt reintegrationism. Antom Árias Curto became the most prominent leader. The organization gave ideological and political support to the Exército Guerrilheiro do Povo Galego Ceive (EGPGC, Guerrilla Army of the Free Galician People).

Galiza Ceibe called for abstention in the 1985 autonomic elections, criticizing the BNG for taking the oath of the Spanish constitution.

=== Dissolution ===
In 1988, along with the Communist Party of National Liberation and local groups, formed the Galician People's Front. The following year Galiza-Ceive OLN decided to leave the organization because of the political differences in the organization's strategy (specially on the support of the EGPGC armed struggle, that Galiza Ceive supported but not the PCLN), and dissolved itself to form the Assembleia do Povo Unido.
