= Galician People's Union-Proletarian Line =

Galician People's Union-Proletarian Line Unión do Povo Galego-liña proletaria
- Leader: Xosé Luís Méndez Ferrín, Luís Soto
- Founded: 1977
- Dissolved: 1978
- Merged into: Galician Party of the Proletariat
- Student wing: Galician Revolutionary Students (ERGA)
- Ideology: Galician independence Marxism-leninism
- Political position: Radical left
- Trade union affiliation: Intersindical Nacional Galega (ING)

The Galician People's Union-Proletarian Line (UPG-lp) was a galician independentist and communist party that supported armed struggle. They edited the magazine Terra e Tempo.

== History ==
Fruit of a split of the Galician People's Union, which occurred in 1977 when Xosé Luís Méndez Ferrín, who accused the UPG of rightism, gradual compliance of the Spanish institutions and interclasism, was expelled from the organization due to their discrepancies in the policy union, his opposition to the legalization of the ING, on the participation in the elections and also for his support to the armed struggle. A significant number of militants followed Ferrín and departed from the organization. In the general elections of 1977 the party called for abstention.

It was renamed in March 1978 as the Galician Party of the Proletariat.
