= Loita Armada Revolucionaria =

Spanish separatist terrorist group

Loita Armada Revolucionaria (LAR)
- Dates active: 1978 - 1984
- Active regions: Galicia
- Ideology: Marxism-Leninism; Galician independentism Left-wing Nationalism
- Status: Disarticulated

Loita Armada Revolucionaria (LAR) (English: Revolutionary Armed Struggle) was an armed Galician nationalist and left-wing independentist organisation. Linked to the political party Galician Party of the Proletariat and the organization Galiza Ceibe-OLN, the group was formed in 1978 and carried out several attacks around Galicia, such as bank assaults and bombing campaigns.

== History ==
LAR's first action was on 28 July 1978, with the burning of some trucks in Santiago de Compostela. Shortly after, the band tried to assault, unsuccessfully, a Gunpowder magazine in Noia. LAR also carried out other armed actions, the best known were the robbery of a subsidiary of the Caja de Ahorros of Ourense, attributed to Antom Árias Curto and the placement of explosives in the works of the Highway AP-9 (September 17, 1979).

In 1980, an important police raid led to the arrest of several members of the organization, including prominent activists and writers, among them writer and poet Xosé Luís Méndez Ferrín. The rest of the militants took refuge in Portugal. The detainees were subject to the antiterrorist law in force, remaining 10 days in solitary confinement, where they reported being tortured. After the arrest only two of the detained were released without charge. The rest of the detainees entered different prisons of Galiza, although later they would be subject of dispersion, applied by the Spanish legal system for the cases of terrorism, being relocated first to Madrid and then Segovia. The organization in support of Galician prisoners, Xuntas Galegas pola Amnistía was formed as a result of the arrests. In 1981 the majority of the prisoners were released, although 5 of them remained in prison. The trial took place in April 1982 in the Audiencia Nacional at Madrid, and resulted in the conviction of all the remaining prisoners.

The government of Felipe González declared an amnesty for all the LAR prisoners in 1983. After the release of most of its members, the group announced its dissolution in 1984.

== Aftermath ==
Loita Armada Revolucionaria was the first armed organization fighting for the independence of Galicia. Later, Liga Armada Galega, Exército Guerrilheiro do Povo Galego Ceive and more recently Resistência Galega would follow the steps of LAR. The group had been linked with other independentist organizations active in Spain, such as ETA.
