= Exército Guerrilheiro do Povo Galego Ceive =

Spanish armed organization 1986–1991

Exército Guerrilheiro do Povo Galego Ceive Guerrilla Army of the Free Galician People
- Dates active: 1986-1991
- Active regions: Galicia
- Ideology: Revolutionary socialism Galician independence Feminism; Ecologism
- Status: Inactive

The Exército Guerrilheiro do Povo Galego Ceive (Guerrilla Army of the Free Galician People in Galician language; EGPGC) was an armed organization formed in 1986 mainly by members of Galiza Ceibe-OLN. It was considered a terrorist organisation by the Spanish Government. The main goals of the organization were the independence of Galicia and the transformation of society according to the principles of socialism. The EGPGC was operative between 1987 and 1991, a time during which the EGPGC made a total of 90 armed actions and a multitude of provisioning actions.

== History ==
=== Origins ===
The EGPGC was founded in 1986 by militants of two nationalist and socialist organizations and Galician, Galiza Ceibe-OLN and the Communist Party of National Liberation, a split of the Galician People's Union (UPG) in 1986, when the V Congress of the UPG decided to accept the Spanish Constitution of 1978 and to abandon the idea of armed struggle. The first leader of EGPGC, Antom Árias Curto came from a previous armed organization, Loita Armada Revolucionaria (LAR), active between 1978 and 1980.

=== First actions ===
The first action of EGPGC took place in January 1987 and consisted in the robbery of dynamite from the mines of As Pontes de García Rodríguez. This dynamite was used in seven bombs that were placed in banks on 5 February of the same year. The attacks were claimed on Radio Galicia as a sign of support for the three independentist militants who were being tried in the Provincial Court of A Coruña that morning: Manuel Chao Dobarro (Galiza Ceibe-OLN), Jaime Castro Leal and José Manuel Sanmartín Bouza. and the prosecutors requested 15 years in prison by frustrated robbery, unlawful annuity weapons and exchange of vehicle plates.

On May 1, the EGPGC struck again with eight bombs, in banks of A Coruña, Compostela, Vigo, Betanzos and As Pontes de García Rodríguez, causing serious material damage. The attack was claimed by the group two days later. On 12 November, the EGPGC blew a tower of a high-voltage line in Matamá (Vigo). Another bomb against a similar infrastructure was placed two days later in Lugo. On 17 December, the Guerrilla Army bombed the delegation of the Spanish government in A Coruña, and exploded an artifact in the city of Ferrol. 1988 continued with the line of attacks on banking interests in Galicia.

=== Security forces and Manuel Fraga ===
In spring 1988 the EGPGC opened another line of targets for their actions. Without abandoning the attacks on banks and industrial facilities, in March the group redirected its attacks against the Spanish security forces. On 9 and 14 March of that year the EGPGC attacked different vehicles of the security forces, destroying various vehicles of the Guardia Civil in Santiago de Compostela and 1 of the National Police in Vigo. The night of the 14th a tower of electric supply was attacked in Castro Caldelas. Due to the use of Portuguese explosives in those attacks, the police considered that the EGPGC maintained contacts with the Popular Forces 25 April. On 30 April 1988 the EGPGC attempted against two chemical companies in Pontevedra: ENCE and ELNOSA. The attacks were motivated by the social opposition to those plants due to the continuing uncontrolled dumping of waste in the Ría of Pontevedra, managing to paralyze the industries for two days.

In the same month, on the 27th, the EGPGC carried forward one of their most important attacks by destroying the summer residence of Manuel Fraga Iribarne, former Minister of Information and Tourism (1962–1969) during the dictatorship of Francisco Franco, MEP at the time by the Popular Alliance, and that only two years later would become president of Galicia. That was the first and only action against a politician by the EGPGC. The attack also caused interest and preoccupation in the Spanish press, until then much more concerned by the activity of ETA. The coincidence of the attack on Manuel Fraga with the murder of the A Coruña businessman Claudio San Martín by the First of October Anti-Fascist Resistance Groups (GRAPO), made the press speculate about the possibility of an intense relationship between the two organizations, which was discarded later by the police. During the election campaign of 1989 in Galicia Manuel Fraga blamed the PSOE for the situation of political violence in Galicia caused by the GRAPO and the EGPGC.

=== First arrests ===
The first arrests occurred on 29 May 1988. The Civil Guard arrested six people in Castro Caldelas. Among them were Antom Árias Curto, main leader of EGPGC; Miguel Anxo Campuzano, union leader and general secretary of the fishers union of the Intersindical Nacional dos Traballadores Galegos (INTG) or Susana Maria Lopes Pogas, who was accused of belonging to the Popular Forces 25 April.

The next day, the Civil Guard arrested another four people. The Civil Governor of A Coruña then stated that he considered the EGPGC to be "disarticulated". However, a phone call on behalf of EGPGC directed the Radio Galicia ensured that the structure of the group remained intact. After the arrests the leaders of all the nationalist arties rejected the EGPGC, with the exception of the Communist Party of National Liberation. Later in the same day (31 May) another supposed member of the EGPGC was arrested. The members of the group denounced tortures by the security forces, which led the Galician Socialist Party-Galician Left (PSG-EG) and the Galician Nationalist Bloc (BNG) to denounce tortures and to demand a decent treatment for the detainees. Two of the arrested were later freed without charges, while the rest were sent to prison and dispersed. All of them, with the exception of Manuel Campuzano, recognized being members of the EGPGC.

As a response to this process, the EGPGC exploded a car bomb in the police station of Ourense, leaving an injured policeman. The next day the members of the EGPGC started a hunger strike to protest dispersion and isolation. Due to this strike the 11 members of the EGPGC were relocated in the jail of Alcalá-Meco. On 25 July of that year more than 100 people went to celebrate the National Day of Galicia as a denounce of the health conditions of the prisoners. On August 9 the EGPGC attacked the statue of Francisco Franco in Ferrol with a bomb.

=== New Galician Poetry manifesto ===
On August 31, 1988, the Guerrilla Army made a public manifesto with the title of New Galician Poetry (Nova Poesía Galega), which set as targets foreign companies, entities that manufacture in Galicia harmful products, drug traffickers, beneficiaries of burned wood in the hills during the common summer forest fires in Galicia and the fascist symbolism maintained since the death of Francisco Franco. The EGPGC rejected, however, "direct confrontation" with the "occupation forces".

=== New offensive and new arrests ===
Despite significant members of EGPGC being in prison, the actions of the armed group continued to be directed against their usual targets, causing only material damage. Just a week after sending the first statement, the EGPGC exploded seven bombs in Compostela, A Coruña, Ferrol and Vigo, against banks and the electric Unión Fenosa.

The decision of not to attack people's lives or physical integrity constituted a differential facts of the EGPGC on other armed groups acting at the time, like the maoist GRAPO, ETA in the Basque Country or Terra Lliure in Catalonia. In this line, the leader of the group Antom Árias Curto assured that the EGPGC would not undermine human lives.

On February 2, 1989, the EGPGC starred, however, an important qualitative leap: a command formed by four militants attacked two Guardia Civil officers in the municipality of Irixoa. One of the agents died and the other was severely wounded. Minutes later, two of the four members of the command were arrested by the Guardia Civil in the vicinity of the place, while the two others managed to escape. That was the first time that a person was killed in an EGPGC attack. Two days after the events, Josefa Rodríguez Porca was arrested in A Coruña, accused of being the leader of the Irixoa command. As a result of the Irixoa shooting a total of 8 people were jailed and took to a prison in Madrid. One of them, Ramón Piñeiro, member of the INTG nationalist union, said that the death have occurred "in random way" and that the goal of the operation was not murder the agent, but to steal their weapons. All the arrested denounced being tortured by the Guardia Civil, including Francisco Niño and some the other detainees that denied being part of the EGPGC.

The press speculated then that the qualitative leap of EGPGC responded to an infiltration of militants of the GRAPO in the EGPGC, a hipotesis that was rejected by the autoridades. Soon later the EGPGC attempted again with a bomb, this time against the Vigo police station. The EGPGC continued, in effect, attacking industrial facilities and on December 18 bombed one electric tower near the Alumina-Aluminio factory in San Cibrán (Lugo), where the toxic products recovered from the Cason boat (sunk at A Costa da Morte) were relocated, which had produced a great social conflict in the region.

=== New objective: drug trafficking ===
Since 1990, the EGPGC began to attack narcos and known drug dealers. On 6 February, the Spanish police defused a bomb placed in a car of a dealer in A Coruña that was linked to the laundering of money from drug trafficking. The group also continued attacks against interests of foreign companies in Galiza. At the beginning of June that year, coinciding with the trials of various militants of the organization, the Guerrilla Army attacked Unión Fenosa and Telefónica facilities in Dozón and Ourense, respectively. On the morning of July 2, the EGPGC attacked a bank in Cerceda and two INEM offices in A Coruña and Ferrol.

The group attacked narcos again on 11 October 1990: a bomb in a disco in Santiago de Compostela that should have exploded when the local was empty, was accidentally activated prematurely causing injuries of varying severity to 49 people and the death of three people, including two members of the EGPGC commando that were putting the bomb in the nightclub, owned by several drug traffickers, among them Oubiña Laureano and Manuel Charlin. This attack led to widespread condemnation of the EGPGC actions and a sharp fall in popularity of the group. Simultaneously to this, other bombs in the Arousa area exploded, causing property damage in shops linked to drug trafficking in Vilanova de Arousa, Vilagarcía de Arousa and Pontevedra. After the attack, the EGPGC claimed that the deaths had been a "human error" and "understood and feel the pain in the act". The group also continued attacking industrial facilities: on March 1, 1991, five electricity towers were destroyed in O Bierzo; on July 10 explosives were placed in ENCE, Pontevedra. Simultaneously, other articles plow explosion causing property damage in shops linked to drug trafficking also in Vilanova de Arousa, Vila Garcia de Arousa and Pontevedra. That was the second action with fatalities in EGPGC and produced an important condemns response among students of the University of Santiago de Compostela. In the attack claim, the EGPGC claimed to have been a "human error" and "understand and feel the pain in the act" [8] and continued attacking industrial facilities: March 1, 1991, electric deputy minister five towers were destroyed in region of Bierzo; July 10 explosives were placed in ENCE and timber Tafisa, both in Ponte Vedra; and on the 13th two electricity towers were attacked in Ferrolterra, leaving 300,000 people without electricity.

=== End of the EGPGC ===
According to police informations in 1991, the leadership of EGPGC was based in Portugal, including its leader, Manuel Chao Dobarro, who was in charge of the organization since 1988, after the historical leader, Antom Árias Curto, was jailed. The Guerrilla Army had not acted since July 1990, and was very weakened after the arrests and the loss of social prestige due to the Clangor bombing. A part of the organization continued advocating for armed struggle, led by Manuel Chao Dobarro from Portugal. On September 21, 1991, the Spanish police arrested Manuel Chao and other members of EGPGC in the Franco-Spanish border in Catalonia, dismantling the organization. The wave of arrests continued and on November 19 eight people linked with the Assembleia do Povo Unido were arrested.

Despite this, several members of the group were arrested in 1998 and 2002.

== See also ==
- Liga Armada Galega

== Sources ==
- Various authors. A Gran Historia de Galicia XVI: a Galicia autónoma (dende a Transición). Volume 1: A Transición en Galicia, Arrecife Edicións Galegas/La Voz de Galicia, 2007, A Coruña.
- Rios Bergantinhos, Noa. A esquerda independentista galega (1977-1995). Abrente Editora, Santiago de Compostela, 2002.
