= Manuel María Fernández Teixeiro =

Spanish poet (1929–2004)

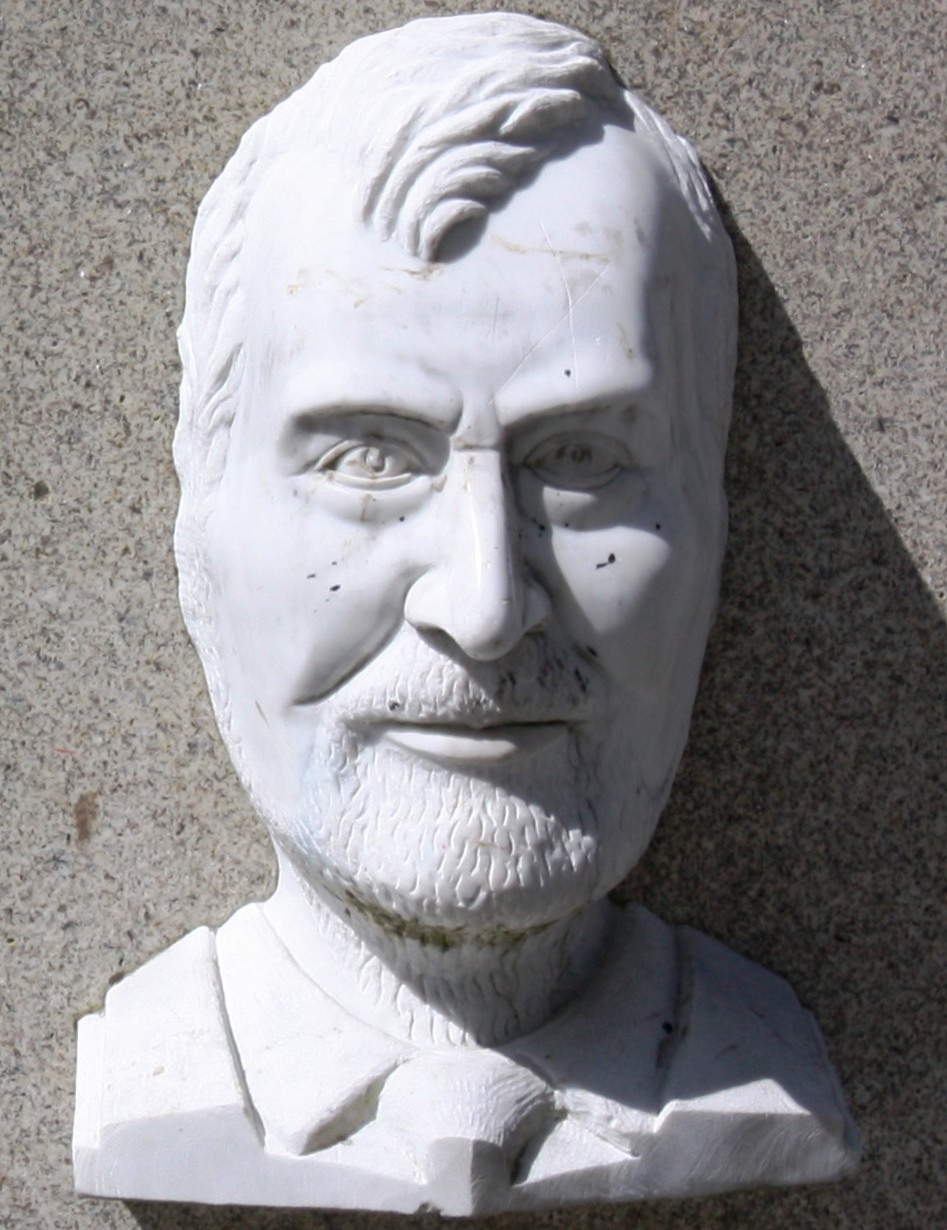
- The bust of Manuel Maria in the Plaza Mayor de Lugo
- Born: October 6, 1929; Outeiro de Rei, Galicia
- Died: September 8, 2004 (aged 74); A Coruña, Galicia
- Occupations: Poet, Academic

Manuel María Fernández Teixeiro, better known as Manuel María (October 6, 1929, Outeiro de Rei–September 8, 2004, A Coruña), was a Spanish poet and academic who wrote in the Galician language. He was notable for his combative character and his political commitment. His poetry touched on themes of love, art, his own political commitment, drawing attention to wrongs, ethnography, physics, history, immateriality, mythology, the animal world, poetic expression, the passing of time, religion, society, language, agricultural labour, urbanism, and geography. The Day of Galician Literature was devoted to him in 2016.

== Biography ==
Manuel María was the son of two well-to-do farmers, Antonio Fernández Núñez, who was the mayor of Outeiro de Rei, and Pastora Teixeiro Casanova. He went to primary school in his small village of Rábade. In 1942 he moved to Lugo to carry out his secondary studies at the Marist Brothers school. In Lugo, at the age of 20, he began his precocious literary career participating in a conference circuit called "Jóvenes valores lucenses." This helped him get in touch with members of a group that met at the Méndez Núñez cafeteria: Luís Pimentel, Ánxel Fole, Juan Rof Codina, Aquilino Iglesia Alvariño, and others. This was his introduction to Galicianism and the Galician literary world. His friendship with Uxío Novoneyra also dates from this period.

In 1950 he published his first collection of poems, Muiñeiro de brétemas ("Miller of mists"), which inaugurated the so-called "Escola da Tebra" (School of Shadows). His disappointment after failing the entrance exams to the University of Santiago inspired his second collection of poems, Morrendo a cada intre ("Dying every minute"). He did his military service in Santiago de Compostela and there he attended a gathering at Café Español, where he became a great friend of Carlos Maside. He then returned to Lugo, where he studied to become an attorney. In 1954 he won a prize at the Xogos Florais (Floral Games) in Ourense. In 1958 he became a court attorney in Monforte de Lemos, where he remained most of the rest of his life. To that city he dedicated a collection of poems, Cancioneiro de Monforte de Lemos. The following year he married Saleta Goi García in Lugo.

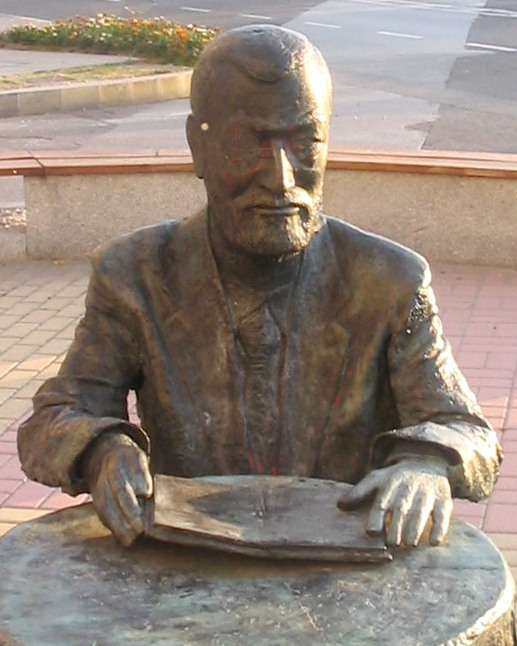
Statue of Manuel María, in Monforte de Lemos.

Although poetry was his preferred medium, Manuel María also attempted essays, narratives and plays. He moved away from a pessimistic existentialist position towards social and political commitment. In the troubled period of the 1960s and 1970s, he took part in the undercover reorganisation of the Galician nationalist political parties; he also worked with various organisations devoted to restoring Galician culture, arranging conferences and reciting poems. He managed the Xistral publishing house and together with its founder he ran the bookshop of the same name. He was made a corresponding member of the Royal Galician Academy in 1970, but renounced his membership in a public letter that appeared in the Galician newspapers in 1975.

A grass-root militant of the Galician People's Union and of the Frente Cultural of the Galician National-Popular Assembly, he was elected councillor in Monforte in 1979 for the Galician National-Popular Bloc. He resigned in 1985, and moved to A Coruña to fully devote himself to literary and cultural activities. His column, Walking on Earth, appeared in the newspaper Our Earth. One of the last campaigns in which he took part was in response to the Prestige oil spill disaster, under the names of Burla Negra (" Black Mockery") and the Plataforma Nunca Máis ("Never More" Platform).

In 1997 he was appointed partner of honour of the Galician Writers Association. He was re-admitted to the Royal Galician Academy in February 2003, under the sponsorship of Xosé Luís Méndez Ferrín and others. respondido por Méndez Ferrín.

He died at A Coruña on 8 September 2004, and was buried in the church of Santa Isabel, Outeiro de Rei.

== Honours ==
On 7 September 2013 his house-museum in Outeiro de Rei was opened, Casa das Hortas ("the House of the Vegetable gardens"). On 4 July 2015, it was announced that the Royal Galician Academy would dedicate Galician Literature Day (May 17) of 2016 to his memory.

== Work ==
=== Works in Galician ===
==== Poetry ====
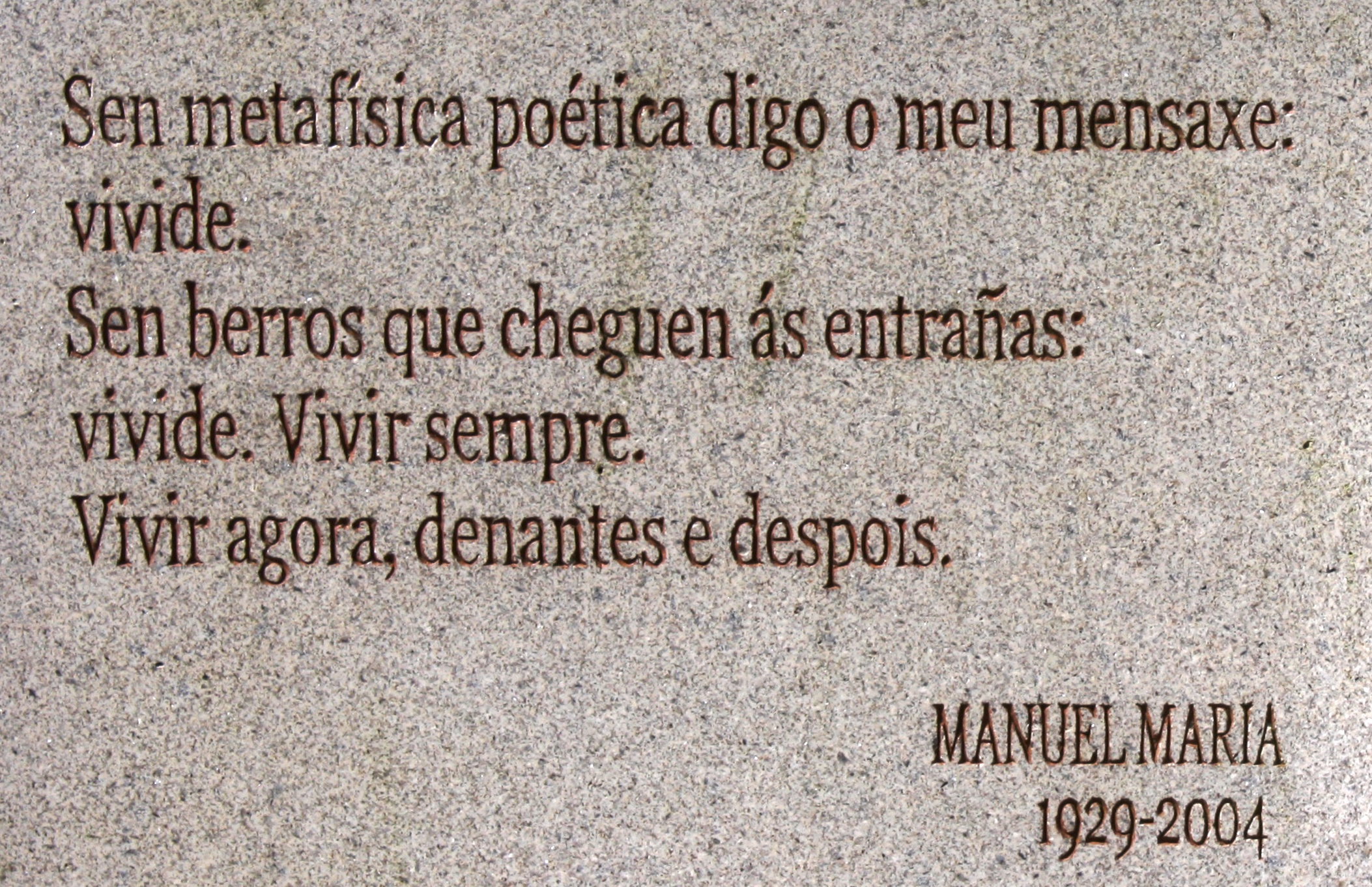
Plaque in the main square of Lugo: Sen metafísica poética digo o meu mensaxe: vivide. Sen berros que cheguen ás entrañas: vivide. Vivir sempre. Vivir agora, denantes e despois.

- Muiñeiro de brétemas (1950, Colección Benito Soto). (Note: A list of most of his work may be consulted at his RAG file.)
- Morrendo a cada intre (1952, La Voz de la Verdad, Lugo).
- Advento (1954, Ediciones Galicia, Centro Galego de Buenos Aires).
- Terra Chá (1954).
- Libro de cantigas (1955, Lugo).
- Documentos personaes (1958, Celta).
- Libro de pregos (1962, Celta).
- Mar Maior (1963, Galaxia).
- Versos frolecidos en louvanza de Foz (1967).
- Proba documental (1968, Xistral).
- Manuel María. Poemas ditos coa súa voz (1969, Edigsa/Xistral, Barcelona). Disco de vinilo de 45 r.p.m.
- Versos pra un país de minifundios (1969, Nós, Buenos Aires).
- Versos pra cantar en feiras e romaxes (1969, Patronato da Cultura Galega de Montevideo).
- Remol (1970 Nós, Buenos Aires).
- Canciós do lusco ao fusco (1970, Xistral, Monforte de Lemos).
- 99 poemas de Manuel María (1972, Razão Actual, Porto).
- Odas nun tempo de paz e de ledicia (1972, Razão Actual, Porto).
- Aldraxe contra a xistra (1973, Roi Xordo).
- Informe pra axudar a alcender unha cerilla (1973, Patronato da Cultura Galega, Montevideo).
- Laio e clamor pola Bretaña (1973, Roi Xordo).
- Seis pétalos de rosa en xeito de retrato (1973, edición do autor). Asinado co pseudónimo Xohán Carneiro.
- Cantos rodados para alleados e colonizados (1976, Xistral).
- Poemas ó outono (1977, Xistral).
- Poemas para construír unha patria (1977, AN-PG).
- O libro das baladas (1978, Follas Novas).
- Catavento de neutrós domesticados (1979, Alvarellos).
- Brétemas do muiñeiro e poema da neboa aferrollada (1980, Xistral).
- Versos de trinta outonos: (escolma 1950-1979) (1980, Xistral). Escolma de Camilo Gómez Torres.
- Escolma de poetas de Outeiro de Rei (1982, Xerais).
- Versos do lume e do vagalume (1982, Galiza Editora).
- Cantigueiro do Orcellón (1984, A. C. Avantar, O Carballiño).
- A luz ressuscitada (1984, AGAL).
- O camiño é unha nostalxia (1985, Arracada Galería de Artes).
- Poemas da labarada estremecida (1985, Xistral).
- Oráculos para cavalinhos-do-demo (1986, Caixa Ourense).
- Ritual para unha tribu capital do concello (1986, Follas secas).
- As lúcidas lúas do outono (1988, Vía Láctea).
- Sonetos ao Val de Quiroga (1988, Concello de Quiroga).
- Saturno (1989, Asociación Cultural Rosalía Castro de Barakaldo). Edición bilíngüe galego-éuscaro.
- Cancioneiro de Monforte de Lemos (1990, Concello de Monforte).
- Homenaxe ao regato do Cepelo (1990, edición do autor).
- Compendio de orballos e incertezas (1991, El Correo Gallego).
- Hinos pra celebrar ao século futuro (1991, Editorial Compostela).
- Panxoliñas (1992, Asociación Cultural Xermolos).
- Antoloxía poética (1993, Espiral Maior).
- Os lonxes do solpor (1993, publicado póstumamente en 2012).
- Poemas a Compostela (1993, El Correo Gallego).
- A primavera de Venus (1993, Espiral Maior).
- Cantigas e cantos de Pantón (1994, Concello de Pantón).
- Poemas para dicirlle a dúas lagoas (1994, Espiral Maior).
- O Miño, canle de luz e néboa (1996, Espiral Maior).
- Antoloxía poética (1997, AS-PG/A Nosa Terra).
- Sonetos á casa de Hortas (1997, Espiral Maior).
- MiniEscolma (1998, edición do autor).
- Camiños de luz e sombra (2000).
- Obra poética completa I (1950-1979) e II (1981-2000) (2001, Espiral Maior).
- Elexías á miña vida pequeniña (2004, Instituto de Estudos Chairegos).
- Cecais hai unha luz (2010, Fundación Manuel María).

==== Prose ====
- Contos en cuarto crecente e outras prosas (1952, Celta).
- O xornaleiro e sete testemuñas máis (1971, Ediciones Galicia. Centro Galego de Buenos Aires).
- Kricoi, Fanoi e Don Lobonis (1973, Editorial Castrelos).
- Os ontes do silencio (1990, Nova Galicia).
- Novena a Santa Isabel, por un devoto de Outeiro de Rei (1995, Asociación Cultural Xermolos).
- Historias do empardecer (2003, Laiovento).

==== Drama ====
- Auto do taberneiro. 4 ventos (1957. 2ª edición no 1970, en Xistral).
- Auto do labrego. Céltiga nº 4 (1961).
- Auto do mariñeiro (brevísima farsa dramática en tres tempos) (1970, Xistral).
- Barriga verde (1973, Castrelos. Edición do 1996 a cargo de Santiago Esteban Radío).
- Unha vez foi o trebón (1976).
- Auto trascendental do ensino tradicional (1979).
- Aventuras e desventuras dunha espiña de toxo chamada Berenguela (1979, Cadernos da Escola Dramática Galega, 1981, Xistral).
- Auto do Maio esmaiolado (1985, Cadernos da Escola Dramática Galega).
- Abril de lume e ferro (1989, Concello de Carral).
- Auto do Castromil ou a revolución dos baúles (1992, Contos do Castromil).
- Unha vez foi o trebón e Farsa de Bululú (1992, Biblioteca 114, El Correo Gallego).
- A lúa vai encoberta (1992, Diario 16 de Galicia).
- Edipo (2003, Universidade da Coruña). Edición de Miguel Anxo Mato.

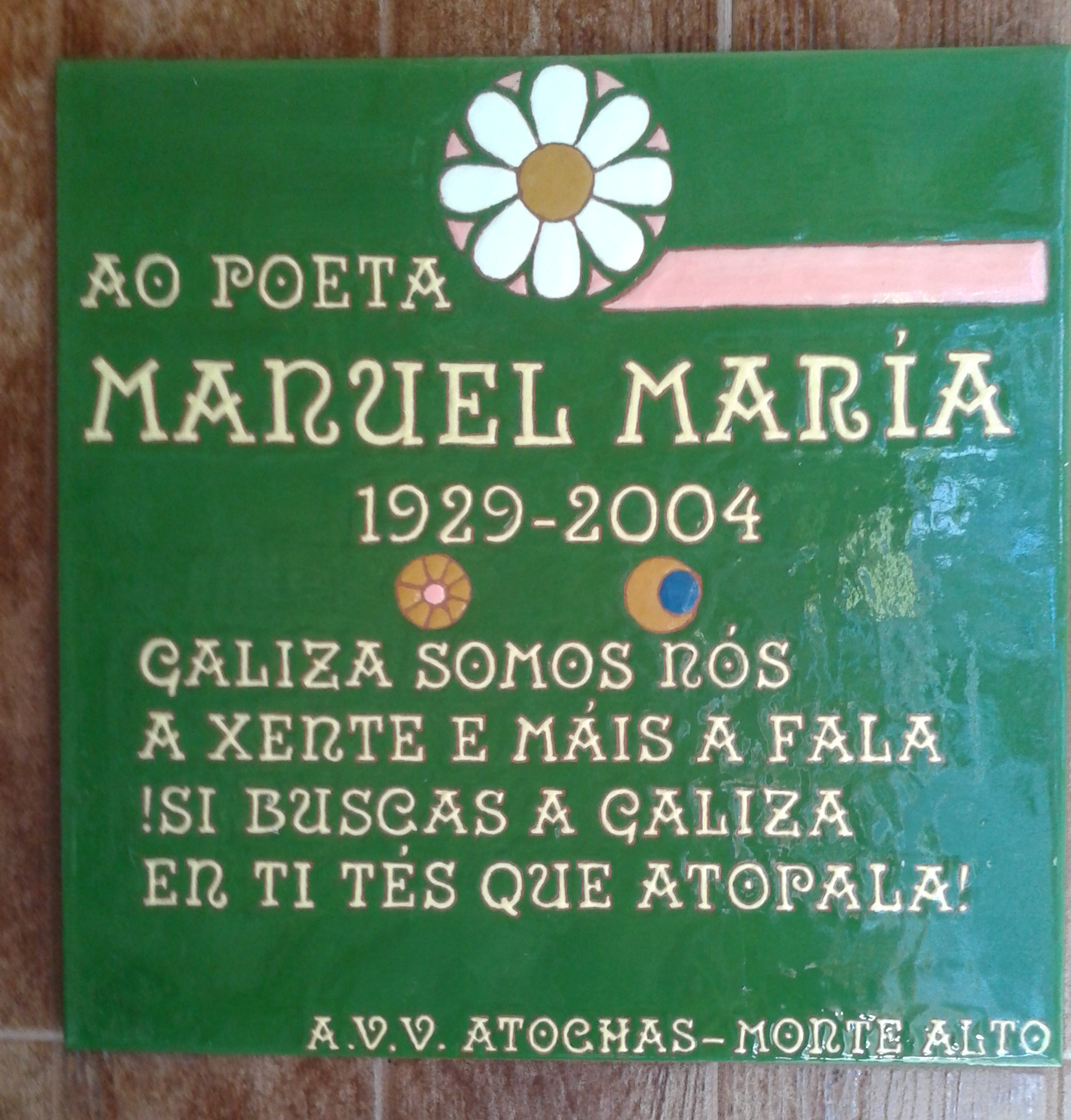
Plaque in homage to Manuel María in his house in Coruña, with some verses of the poem "Galicia".

==== Juvenile works ====
- Os soños na gaiola (1968. Reeditado en Xerais).
- As rúas do vento ceibe (1979, Xistral).
- A tribo ten catro ríos (1991, S. M.).
- Unha sombra vai polo camiño; Como desapareceu a Atlántida e apareceron os lagartos (1991, Xerais).
- Cando o mar foi polo río (1992, S. M.).
- Viaxes e vagancias de M. P. (1994, S. M.).
- As ribeiras son escuras (1997, Everest Galicia).
- O bigote de Mimí (2003, Everest Galicia).

==== Essays ====
- Notas en col da poesía de Fermín Bouza-Brei (1958, separata da Real Academia Galega).
- Noticia da vida e da poesía de Xosé Crecente Vega (1968, Universidade de Coimbra).
- Noticia da poesía galega de posguerra (1972, Sociedade da Língua Portuguesa).
- Andando a Terra (1990, A Nosa Terra). Co pseudónimo de Manuel Hortas Vilanova.
- A Terra Chá: poesía e paisaxe (2003, Real Academia Galega).
- Galiza (2010, Fundación Manuel María).

==== Correspondence ====
- Correspondencia entre Manuel María e Ramón Otero Pedrayo (1951-1974) (2014, Fundación Manuel María). Edición de Xosé Manuel Sánchez Rei e Estefanía Mosquera Castro.

==== Collections ====
- Sursum corda. Poesía galego-portuguesa ao Viño (2000, Laiovento).
- Rosalia de Castro. Antologia poética. Cancioneiro rosaliano, poema A Rosalía. (1963).
- A nova canción galega a altura do ano 70 en (1971) Galicia ano 70. Ediciones Celta, Lugo. Canda Díaz Pardo, Ánxel Fole et al.
- II Festival da Poesía do Condado (1982, S. C. D. Condado).
- III Festival da Poesía no Condado (1983, S. C. D. Condado).
- IV Festival da Poesía no Condado (1984, S. C. D. Condado).
- VI Festival da Poesía no Condado (1986, S. C. D. Condado).
- VII Festival da Poesia no Condado (1987, S. C. D. Condado).
- VIII Festival da Poesia no Condado. Escolma Poética (1988, S. C. D. Condado).
- IX Festival da Poesia no Condado. Escolma Poética (1989, S. C. D. Condado).
- X Festival da Poesia no Condado. Escolma Poética (1990, S. C. D. Condado).
- 12 anos na búsqueda da nosa identidade (1990, Xermolos).
- XI Festival da Poesia no Condado (1991, S. C. D. Condado).
- XIII Festival da Poesia no Condado (1993, S. C. D. Condado).
- Desde mil novecentos trinta e seis: homenaxe da poesía e da plástica galega aos que loitaron pola liberdade (1995, Edicións do Castro).
- Construír a paz (1996, Xerais).
- Novo do trinque (1997, BNG).
- Poetas entre a tradición e a modernidade: antoloxía (1997, AS-PG/A Nosa Terra). Coeditor con Anxo Gómez Sánchez.
- 16 poemas galegos para Ernesto Che Guevara contra a súa morte (1967-1973) (1997, Universidade de Santiago de Compostela).
- Neste silencio: Arredor de Uxío Novoneyra (2000, Noitarenga).
- Poemas e contos da muralla (2001, A Nosa Terra).
- Poetas e narradores nas súas voces. I (2001, Consello da Cultura Galega).
- Alma de beiramar (2003, Asociación de Escritores en Lingua Galega).
- Antoloxía consultada da poesía galega 1976-2000 (2003, Tris Tram). Por Arturo Casas.
- Homenaxe poética ao trobador Xohan de Requeixo (2003).
- Intifada. Ofrenda dos poetas galegos a Palestina (2003, Fundación Araguaney).
- Negra sombra. Intervención poética contra a marea negra (2003, Espiral Maior).
- 23 poetas galegos cantan a don Antonio Machado (2004, Hipocampo).
- Xela Arias, quedas en nós (2004, Xerais).
- Cartafol poético para Alexandre Bóveda (2006, Espiral Maior).
- Do máis fondo do silencio saen voces (2006, Asociación Cultural Panda de Relacións Laborais, A Coruña).
- Poemas pola memoria (1936-2006) (2006, Xunta de Galicia).
- Tamén navegar (2011, Toxosoutos).

==== Articles in Grial magazine ====
- "A poesía galega de Celso Emilio Ferreiro", revista Grial nº 6 (1964).
- "As augas van caudales", revista Grial nº 9 (1965).
- "Os alugados", revista Grial nº 14 (1966).
- "Raimon, poeta de noso tempo", revista Grial nº 18 (1967).

=== Works in Spanish ===
==== Poetry ====
- Sermón para decir en cualquier tiempo (1960).

== Bibliography ==
- Manuel María. Fotobiografía sonora. Sarria: Ouvirmos. 2005. ISBN 978-8460971689.
- Losada Castro, Basilio (1969). Manuel María. Antología poética. Escolma poética, in Col. Adonais. Ediciones Rialp. ISBN 9788432115851.
- Cabana Yanes, Darío Xohán (2006). «De Manuel María a Ferrín: A grande xeración», discurso de ingreso na RAG.
- Freixeiro Mato, Xosé Ramón (2007). Cucou o cuco cuqueiro. (Lingua e estilo na obra de Manuel María). Fundación Caixa Galicia.
- García Fernández, Xosé Lois (1994). Lectura e itinerario posíbel polo Terra Chá de Manuel María, Deputación de Lugo.
- García Negro, María Pilar; Dobarro Paz, Xosé María et al. «Manuel María», in Gran Enciclopedia Galega (on DVD), 2005.
- Queixas Zas, Mercedes (2016). Labrego con algo de poeta. Editorial Galaxia.
- Veiga, Manuel: «Manuel María, opera omnia. Revisión dos cincuenta anos de poesía do autor chairego» A Nosa Terra n.º 1 090, 10–16 July 2003. Year XXVI.
- Veiga, Manuel (2016): Manuel María, buscando un país. Edicións Xerais de Galicia.
