= Assembleia do Povo Unido =

Assembly of the United People Assembleia do Povo Unido
- Founded: 1989
- Dissolved: 1995
- Newspaper: Povo Unido
- Youth wing: AMI
- Women's wing: Galician Nationalist Women (MNG)
- Ideology: Galician independence Socialism; Feminism
- Political position: Radical left
- Trade union affiliation: Intersindical Nacional dos Traballadores Galegos (INTG) and Confederación Intersindical Galega (CIG)
- Colors: Red, white, blue

The Assembly of the United People (APU) (Galician language: Assembleia do Povo Unido) was a Galician political organization, with an independentist, socialist and feminist ideology. It was formed in 1989 from a split of the first Galician People's Front, and disappeared with its self-dissolution in 1995.

== The birth of APU: political-ideological principles ==
The Assembly of the United People was born in June 1989 from a severe crisis in FPG, fractured into two fractions confronted within the Galician independence movement that coexist in the said FPG, the PCLN, the EGPGC (Guerrilla Army of the Free Galician People, armed organization) the Comités Anti-repressivos (Anti-repressive Committees), the JUGA (Juntas Galegas pola Amnistia) and MNG (Galician Nationalist Women). On the 28 and 29 October 1989, the National Constituent Assembly of the APU was held in Santiago de Compostela. The assembly blamed the Communist Party of National Liberation for the split of the FPG and said that the majority of the front's membership supported them.

The APU follows the classic model of the national liberation movements in the Third World. That was reflected in the foundational political documents, that said "The revolutionary advancement as the sum of the political and military struggle", and that claims the validity of revolutionary violence to take the power, using examples like Cuba, Algeria, Vietnam or Nicaragua.

The organization aspired to the creation of a "Popular Unity" or "National Liberation Front" agglutinating the Galician worker people and the popular classes: the industrial proletariat, sailors, peasants and petty bourgeoisie", standing as the indispensable principles to integrate this front, the understanding of the armed struggle in Galicia and the fundamental role of the National Liberation process, the Total Amnesty, understood as the freedom of the galician political prisoners and the development of a political, social and economic program in accord to the interests of the popular classes. This unity for national liberation as proposed by the APU had as potential partners the other nationalist and left-wing organizations existing in Galicia at the time: BNG, PSG-EG and the FPG, but this never took place.

At the linguistic level, the APU advocated and practiced reintegracionism (defence of the Galician-Portuguese-Brazilian language unity) and used the Galician Association of Language standard.

== History ==
The JUGA were their reference anti-repressive organization of reference and Galician Nationalist Women (MNG) were the feminist organization of reference. The party had some influence in the trade union field, through the INTG, integrated later in the Confederación Intersindical Galega.

In 1990 APU conducted a campaign for the self-determination of Galicia. The following year, present municipal candidates in Santiago de Compostela, Vigo and Ferrol, with the slogan O independentismo aos concelhos. The election results were considered disappointing. There was also an extraordinary assembly in which the fall of the regimes of Eastern Europe was debated. In 1992, eleven militants of the APU were expelled from the INTG accused of supporting the armed struggle of the EGPGC. The following year, the party organized the III National Assembly and soon after launched the double campaign This is not Spain and Because Galiza is not Spain, and promoted abstention to the general elections of that year. In October of the same year, the APU presented a list for the elections to the autonomous Galician Parliament and won 1,492 votes (0.10%). In 1994 and 1995 takes place, in two parts, the IV National Assembly. In the second assembly (February 1995) the dissolution of the organization is approved due to the poor electoral results, the lack of influence in the galician society and the end of the EGPGC's armed struggle.

=== Campaigns and political activities ===
In 1990 the organization conducted a campaign in favor of self-determination of Galicia. Between 1989 and 1994, the APU called for demonstrations in the Day of the Galician Fatherland (July 25) in various ways. At 89, together with FPG, with the motto "Independence"; at 90, announces in conjunction with FPG, LCR, PCE (ML) and PCPG with the motto Autodeterminación, camiño da independencia; at 91, alone, with the motto Em luita pola independência; at 92, also alone, with the motto Adiante pola independência; in 1993 again alone with the motto Porque a Galiza non é España... independência and in 1994 called for their last July 25 demonstration with the motto A Galiza sen medo berra independência!.

The APU edited 11 numbers of its national magazine, Povo Unido, publishing the first number in February 1990 and the last in July, 1994 In September 1993, also published a Draft for the Constitution of Galiza.

== Electoral results ==
=== Local elections ===
| Election | Votes | % | Seats |
|---|---|---|---|
| Ferrol city council election, 1991 | 101 | 0.29 | 0 / 25 |
| Santiago de Compostela city council election, 1991 | 60 | 0.15 | 0 / 25 |
| Vigo city council election, 1991 | 137 | 0.11 | 0 / 25 |

=== Galician elections ===
| Election | Votes | % | Seats |
|---|---|---|---|
| 1993 Galician regional election | 1,492 | 0.10 | 0 / 75 |

== Gallery ==
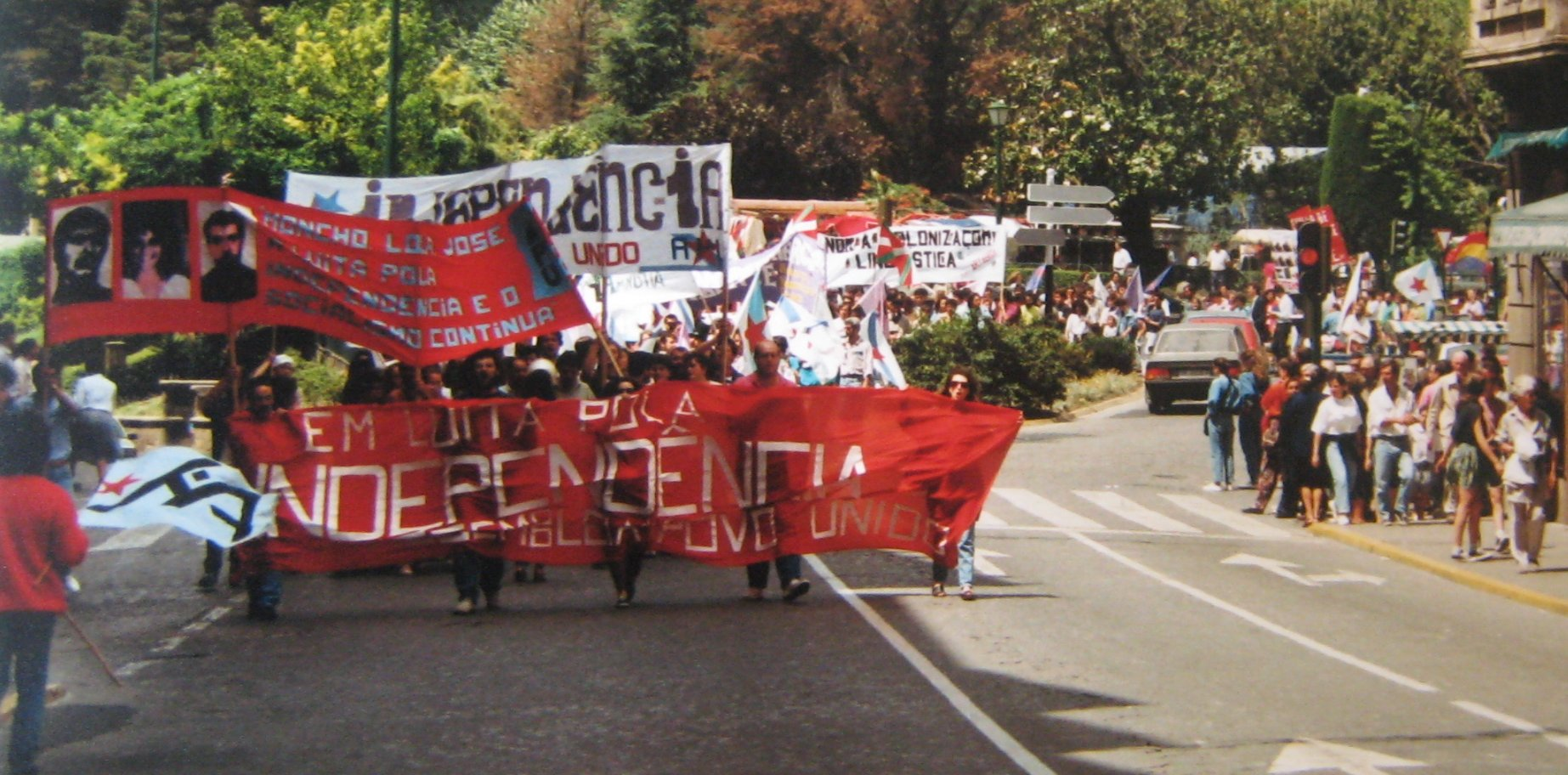
Demonstration in the 1991 Día Nacional de Galicia.

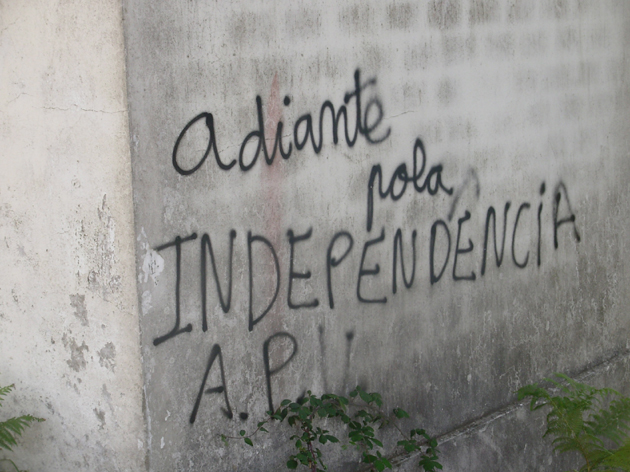
Graffiti supporting the organization.

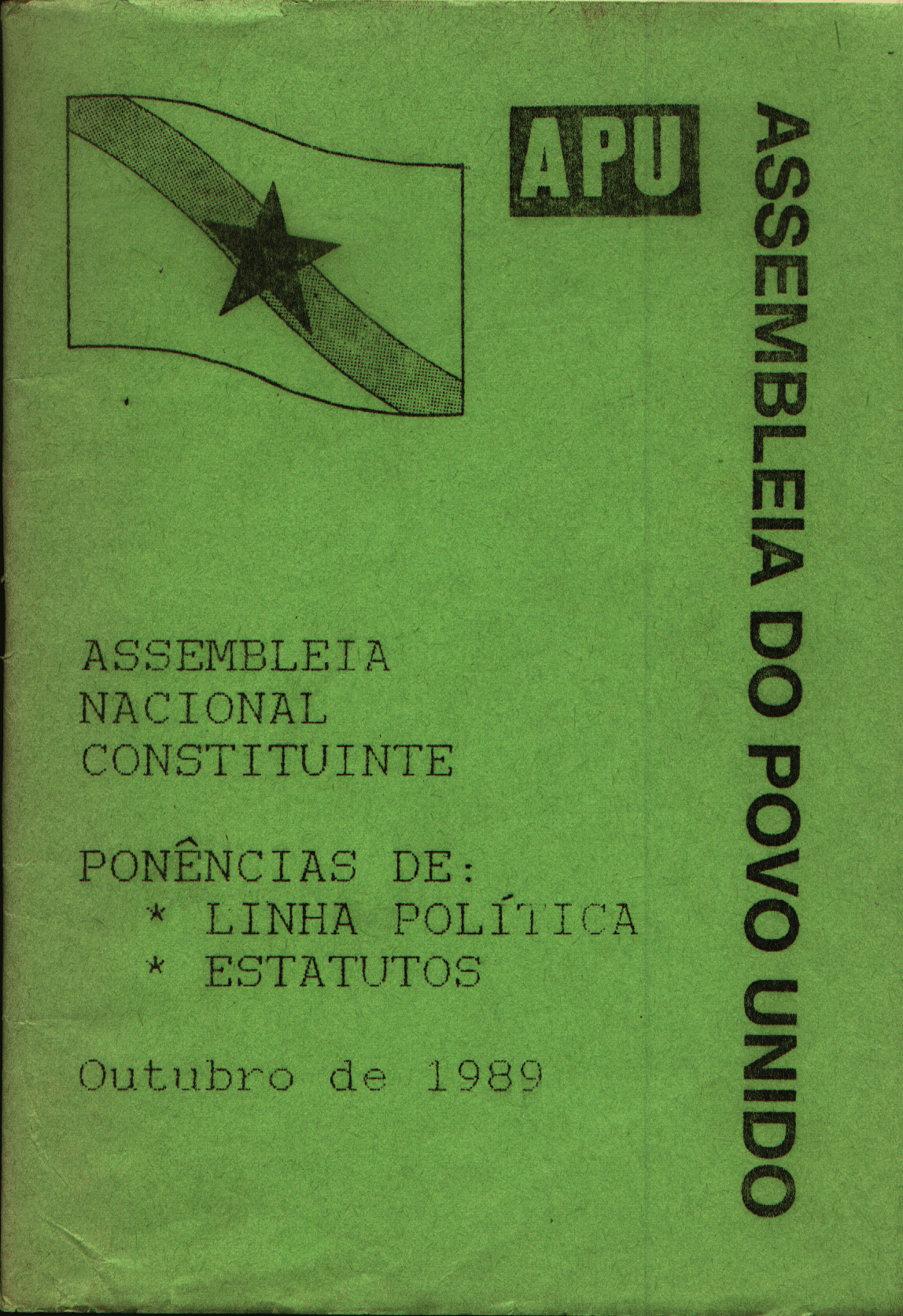
Document of the I National Assembly.
