= Resistência Galega =

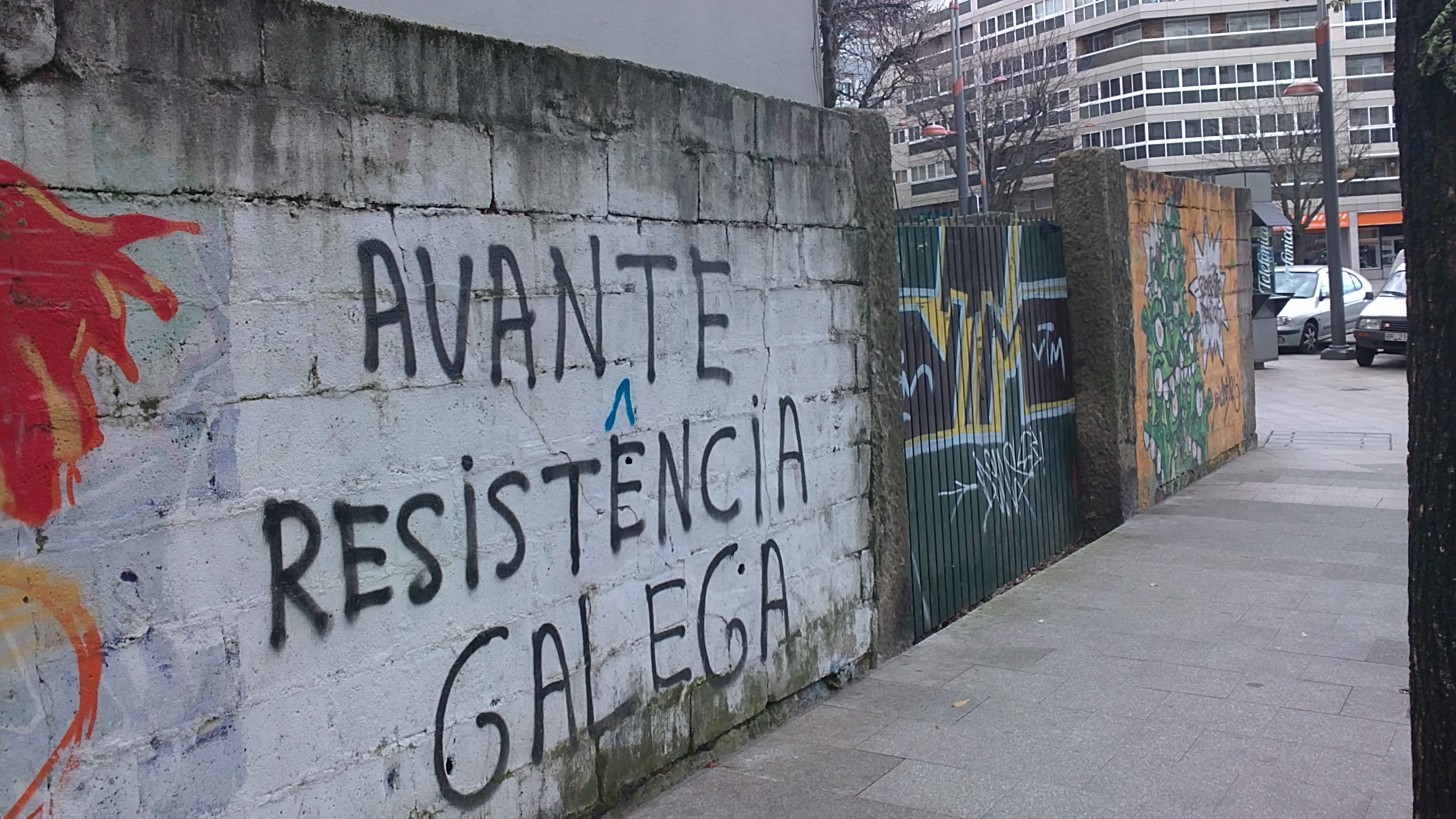
Graffiti in support of Resistência Galega (REGA)

Resistência Galega (English: Galician Resistance), sometimes referred to as REGA, is the term used by a series of left-wing and Galician separatist organisations and individuals to claim attacks in Galicia. The term was first used in 2005 when a manifesto named Manifesto da Resistência Galega appeared on the Internet. Since then, Resistência Galega has carried out dozens of attacks against political party offices and banks across Galicia.

== Overview ==
Resistência Galega is the continuation of several Galician separatist groups active in the 1970s and 80s such as the Loita Armada Revolucionaria, "Liga Armada Galega" or "Exército Guerrilheiro do Povo Galego Ceive". The organisation was reportedly created by the Assembleia da Mocidade Independentista (English: Assembly of Independentist Youth) in 2005 and it became known to the public with a manifesto published on the internet on 20 November that same year. In it, several attacks against political party offices, the Spanish Army, and incidents which occurred during the Prestige oil spill crisis were claimed.

According to Spanish police, the group has three active cells with each one consisting of four members. Two of them based in the cities of Santiago and Vigo, and another one moving around Galicia. The group also has around 200 sympathizers and supporters. Its leader is suspected to be Antonio García Matos, former member of the extinct organisation "Exército Guerrilheiro". Also known as "Toninho", he was arrested in November 2005 and was soon released, being on the run since then. He is believed to be hiding in Portugal, from where he orders the organisation's attacks. There were also reported contacts with ETA. Some activists have reportedly been trained in the mountains in rural Galicia. In October 2010, it was announced that the Spanish High Court would designate Resistência Galega as a terrorist group, comparing the group with other armed organisations in Spain, such as ETA. Following a petrol bomb attack in January 2011, authorities labelled the incident as a "terrorist attack" and announced that the High Court would take part in the investigation, as a "case of terrorism".

== Attacks ==
=== 2005 ===
- July 23: On the eve of the National Day of Galicia, Resistência Galega commits its first attack by planting a bomb in a bank office in Santiago de Compostela.

=== 2007 ===
- March 27: Police officers safely defuse a bomb placed in a construction site in Nigrán, Pontevedra.
- May 9: Police officers safely detonate a bomb placed in a construction site in Cangas do Morrazo, Pontevedra.
- May 15: A bomb explodes in an industrial park in O Ceao, Lugo. No one was injured in the attack, which heavily damaged the building.
- September 25: A bomb explodes in Mugardos, A Coruña. No one was injured in the attack, which destroyed two houses.
- November 15: A powerful bomb destroys an estate agency in Cangas do Morrazo, Pontevedra. No one was injured.

=== 2008 ===
- February 8: A bomb explodes in a construction company building in Perbes, A Coruña. No one was injured.

=== 2009 ===
- June 16: A bomb explodes in a bank in Vigo. No one was injured. Another bomb went off at a businessman's house in Bease and an arson fire was set in a car dealership in Priegue, Pontevedra.
- July 9: An explosive device destroys a bank office in Cangas do Morrazo, Pontevedra. No one was injured.
- July 23: A bomb placed in front of a bank office in Vigo is safely exploded by police.

=== 2010 ===
- January 1: Two explosive devices placed under two local police patrol cars go off in Santiago. No one was injured.
- January 28: An explosive device goes off in the house of professor Blanco Valdés in Santiago de Compostela. No one was injured.
- April 19: A petrol bomb is thrown at the People's Party office in Nigrán, Pontevedra. No one was injured.
- July 20: A bomb goes off in an employer's organization office in Vigo. The bomb caused great damage to the building, but no one was injured.
- July 26: A homemade bomb explodes in front of the house of judge Míguez Poza in Santiago de Compostela. No one was injured.
- September 16: A bomb explodes in a Socialist Party office in A Estrada. No one was injured in the attack, which damaged the office building.
- September 27: A small bomb explodes in front of an employers' organization in Lugo, causing damage to the building. No one was injured.
- September 28: An explosive device goes off in a Socialist Party office in Salceda de Caselas, Pontevedra. No one was injured. Hours later, another Socialist office was attacked in Salvaterra do Miño.
- December 25: A bomb explodes in a Socialist Party office in Teo, A Coruña. No one was injured.

=== 2011 ===
- January 4: Four petrol bombs are thrown at a Socialist Party office in Betanzos, A Coruña. No one was injured.
- January 18: Two petrol bombs are thrown at a Socialist Party office in Carral, A Coruña. No one was injured.
- January 27: As part of a general strike in Galicia, a molotov cocktail is thrown at a bank in Vigo. Three individuals were arrested and later released.
- February 1: An explosive device, planted in solidarity with Greek and Chilean anarchist prisoners, goes off at a courthouse in Betanzos, A Coruña.
- February 9: A petrol bomb is thrown at the Unión General de Trabajadores (UGT) trade union office in A Coruña.
- February 10: An explosive device fails to explode in front of a bank office in Vigo. No one was injured.
- March 9: A bomb explodes at the former house of the Santiago de Compostela mayor. No one was injured.
- June 13: A bomb explodes in front of a PP office in Ordes, destroying the office and damaging cars and buildings. No one was injured.
