= Galician People's Assembly =

Galician People's Assembly Asemblea Popular Galega
- Leader: Xan López Facal
- Founded: 1976
- Dissolved: 1977
- Split from: AN-PG
- Succeeded by: Galician Workers Party
- Ideology: Galician nationalism Socialism; Left-wing nationalism Ecologism
- Union affiliation: Comités de Traballadores Galegos and Comisións Labregas Terra

The Galician People's Assembly (APG; Asemblea Popular Galega, in Galician language) was a political organization founded on October 10, 1976 by a splinter group of the Galician National-Popular Assembly. The APG considered AN-PG to close to the Galician People's Union. Its leaders were Xan López Facal, César Portela, Carlos Vázquez and Mario López Rico. The organization held its first congress in December 1976. The APG supported the Galician Socialist Party, a splinter of the agrarian union Comisións Labregas, called Comisións Labregas Terra and the Comités de Traballadores Galegos. The APG participated in the launching of the magazine Teima (1976-1977). The APG ceased to exist on December 4, 1977; that same year part of his membership helped to found the Galician Workers Party (POG).
