= Galician Workers Union =

Historic Galician political organisation

SOG
- Galician Workers Union
- Sindicato Obreiro Galego
- Founded: 1975
- Dissolved: 1977
- Headquarters: Santiago de Compostela
- Location: Galicia

The Galician Workers Union (SOG, Sindicato Obreiro Galego in Galician language), was a Galician nationalist and anticapitalist union in Galiza.

Its official publication was O Eixo, editing at the same time other comarcal and sectorial publications. The SOG was founded in May 1975 when the Frente Obreiro (Workers Front) of the Galician People's Union decided to become a union. The SOG was part of the Galician National Popular Assembly (AN-PG). The SOG defended "combative" unionism and rejected any kind of collaboration with the Patronal.

In April 1976, the organization held its first General Assembly. However, it disappeared just a year later, in March 1977 to found, with other unions, the Intersindical Nacional Galega (ING).
