= Néstor Rego =

Spanish politician (born 1962)

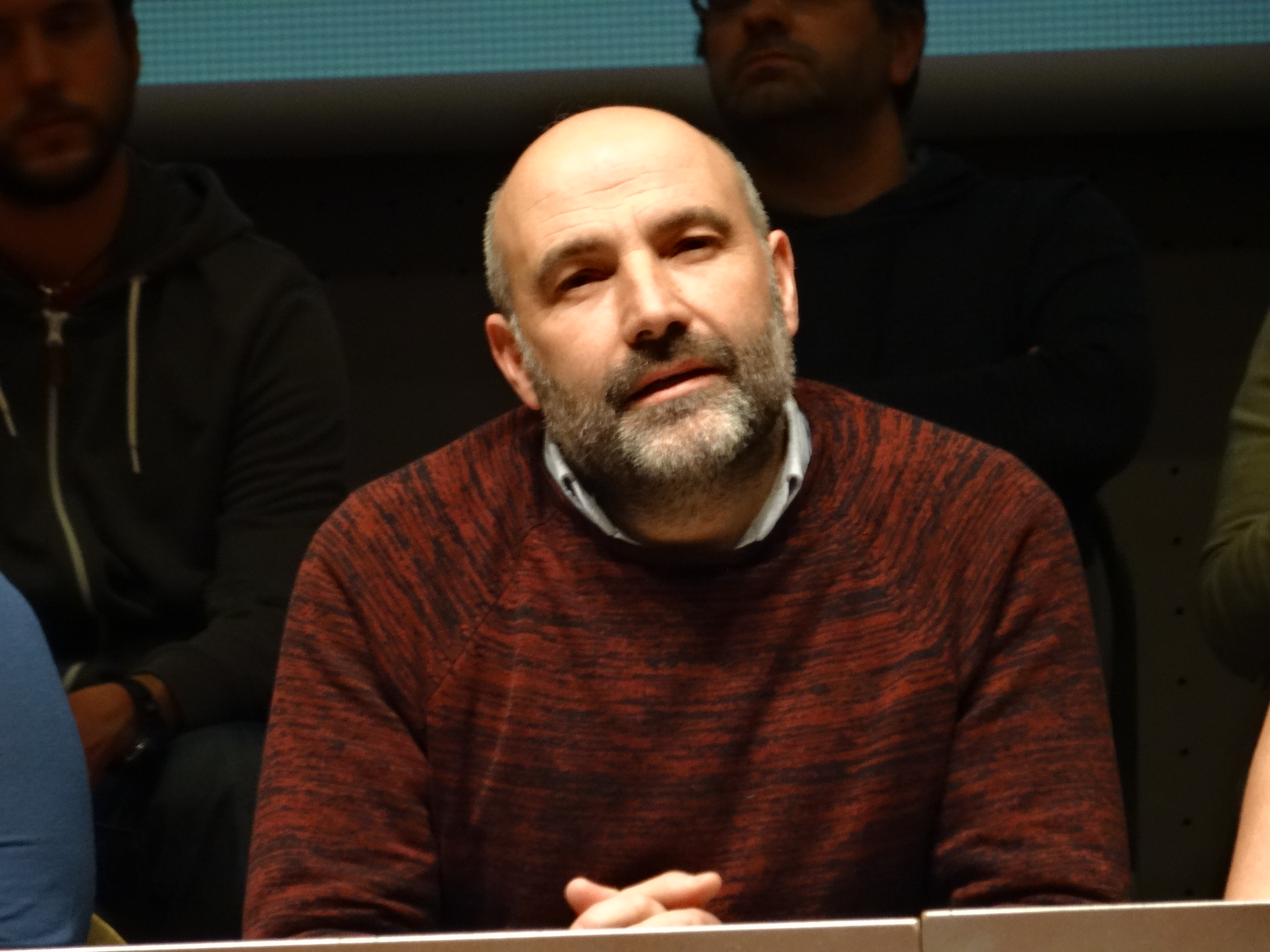
- Rego in February 2016

Member of the Congress of Deputies of Spain
- Incumbent
- Assumed office 3 December 2019
- Constituency: A Coruña

Deputy Mayor of Santiago de Compostela
- In office 2003–2008

Member of Santiago de Compostela Municipal Council
- In office 1995–2008

Personal details
- Born: Néstor Rego Candamil; 2 April 1962 (age 64) O Vicedo, Galicia, Spain
- Party: Galician People's Union; Galician Nationalist Bloc (since 1982)
- Other political affiliations: Galician Revolutionary Students (1977–1988)
- Education: University of Santiago de Compostela
- Occupation: Teacher

Néstor Rego Candamil (born 2 April 1962) is a Galician teacher, politician and a member of the Congress of Deputies of Spain. He is leader of the Galician People's Union.

== Early life ==
Rego was born on 2 April 1962 in O Vicedo, Galicia. He grew up in A Mariña where he was acquainted with other young Galician nationalists including Hernán Naval. He was educated in Viveiro where he joined the Galician Revolutionary Students (ERGA) in 1977. He was one of the founders of the Galician Youth Union (UMG), the youth wing of the Galician People's Union (UPG).

Rego has a degree in geography and history from the University of Santiago de Compostela. Whilst at university he helped found the Comités Abertos de Faculdade, a student organization. When the Galician Nationalist Bloc (BNG) was founded in 1982 Rego joined its leadership as a representative of ERGA.

== Career ==
Rego taught Galician language and literature in high schools. He has taught at the Antón Losada Diéguez Institute in A Estrada and the Antón Fraguas Institute in Santiago de Compostela.

Rego was elected to Santiago de Compostela Municipal Council at the 1995 local election as a BNG candidate. He was re-elected at the 1999, 2003 and 2007 local elections. Following the 1999 election the BNG formed an administration with the Socialists' Party of Galicia and Rego was appointed councillor for the environment. He was deputy mayor in charge of cultural affairs from 2003 to 2008. He resigned in 2008 to return to teaching.

Rego was elected general-secretary of the Galician People's Union (UPG) in June 2012. He was elected to the BNG's executive in March 2013. At the April 2019 general election he was placed first on BNG's list of candidates in the Province of A Coruña but the alliance failed to win any seats in the province. He contested the 2019 November general election as a BNG candidate in the Province of A Coruña and was elected to the Congress of Deputies.

== Electoral history ==
Electoral history of Néstor Rego
Election	Constituency	Party	Alliance	No.	Result
1995 local	Santiago de Compostela	Galician People's Union	Galician Nationalist Bloc	2	Elected
1999 local	Santiago de Compostela	Galician People's Union	Galician Nationalist Bloc		Elected
2003 local	Santiago de Compostela	Galician People's Union	Galician Nationalist Bloc	1	Elected
2007 local	Santiago de Compostela	Galician People's Union	Galician Nationalist Bloc	1	Elected
2019 April general	Province of A Coruña	Galician People's Union	Galician Nationalist Bloc	1	Not elected
2019 November general	Province of A Coruña	Galician People's Union	Galician Nationalist Bloc	1	Elected
