= Galicia Socialista =

- Secretary-General: Camilo Nogueira Román; Xan López Facal
- Founded: 1968
- Dissolved: 1972
- Merged into: Galician People's Union
- Headquarters: Vigo
- Ideology: Revolutionary socialism Galician nationalism Antifascism

Galicia Socialista (transl. Socialist Galicia) was a clandestine anti-Francoist group that operated in Galicia, mainly in the city of Vigo.

== History ==
The group was founded by Camilo Nogueira and Xan López Facal, and was basically composed of industrial workers, especially from the Citroën factory of Vigo, were they tried unsuccessfully to create a Galician nationalist union. Galicia Socialista also had a relevant presence in Santiago de Compostela, mainly among college students.

Originally, the group maintained contacts with the Popular Liberation Front (FLP) and worked within Comisiones Obreras (CCOO). In 1972 Galicia Socialista broke with the Spanish movements and joined the Galician People's Union (UPG). Many of its political cadres would later participate in the foundation of the Galician Workers Party (POG).
