= Galician People's Front =

Galician People's Front Frente Popular Galega
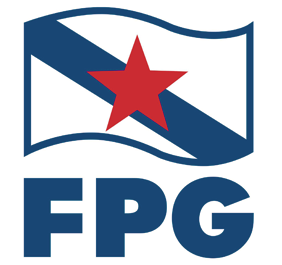
- Spokesperson: Mariano Abalo
- Founded: 1986
- Merger of: Communist Party of National Liberation; Galiza Ceibe-OLN; Colectivos Nacionalistas de Trasancos; Grupos Independentistas Galegos; Colectivo Iskeiro
- Student wing: Asemblea Nacional das Estudantes Galegas
- Youth wing: Xeira; Adiante-Galician Revolutionary Youth (2004–2013)
- Ideology: Communism; Galician independence Marxism-Leninism
- Political position: Far-left
- National affiliation: Anova-Nationalist Brotherhood
- Trade union affiliation: Central Unitaria de Traballadores (CUT)
- Colors: Red, white, blue
- Local Government (2019–2023) (Note: Difficult to count because the party didn't run on its own lists, but on coalitions. At least 1 councillor in Vigo, 2 in Cangas do Morrazo, 1 in Santiago de Compostela, 1 at A Coruña and 1 in Ribadavia.): 6 / 3,811

Website
- frentepopular.gl

The Galician People's Front (Galician: Frente Popular Galega) is a Galician political organization with a socialist and independentist ideology.

== History ==
After the Galician People's Union (UPG) accepted the participation of the Bloque Nacionalista Galego (BNG) in the Galician Parliament in 1986, 13 members of its Central Committee led by Mariano Abalo and Xan Carballo left the party and created the Communist Collective. On 25 July 1986, the group was transformed into the Communist Party of National Liberation (PCLN). Later, the 3rd National Assembly of the BNG expelled the group because they gave support to Herri Batasuna.

In 1987, PCLN and Galiza Ceibe-OLN, along with other small organizations, created the FPG. In June 1989, they suffered a split as the sectors that supported the armed struggle of the EGPGC broke away and formed Assembleia do Povo Unido. In the Elections for the Galician Parliament 2001, the group obtained 3,176 votes (0.3%), in the Elections for the Spanish Parliament 2004, it obtained 2,257 votes (0.12%), and in the Elections for the Galician Parliament 2005, it obtained 2,982 votes (0.2%).

Since 2012, the FPG is part of Anova-Nationalist Brotherhood.

== Elections ==
Election	Votes	%	Seats	Mayors
Galician parliamentary election, 1989	2,629	0.20	0 / 75	
Spanish general election, 1989	3,657	0.27	0 / 350	
Spanish local elections, 1991 (Note: Only presented lists in Cangas, Pontevedra, where the FPG won 4 seats and the 16.68% of the votes, Carnota, where they won 2 seats and the 13.25% of the votes, O Barco de Valdeorras where the FPG won no seats and the 1.32% of the votes, Ourense where they won no seats and the 0.32% of the vote, Muros, A Coruña where they won no seats and the 3.54% of the vote and Santiago de Compostela where they won no seats and the 0.32% of the vote.)	2,708	0.19	6 / 4,033	0 / 314
Spanish local elections, 1995 (Note: Only presented lists in Cangas, Pontevedra, under the name of Unidade Popular (Popular Unity), that won 2 seats and the 8.95% of the votes, Vigo, where they gained no seats and the 0.13% of the votes and Muros, A Coruña, where they won no seats and the 1.91% of the votes.)	1.380	0.18	2 / 4,033	0 / 315
Spanish general election, 1996	2,065	0.12	0 / 350	
Galician parliamentary election, 1997	3,395	0.21	0 / 75	
Spanish local elections, 1999 (Note: Only presented a list in Cangas, Pontevedra, that won 1 seat and the 5.31% of the votes.)	645	0.04	1 / 4,033	0 / 316
Spanish general election, 2000	2,252	0.14	0 / 350	
Galician parliamentary election, 2001	3,176	0.21	0 / 75	
Spanish local elections, 2003 (Note: Only presented listS in Cangas, Pontevedra, that won 1 seat and the 6.94% of the votes and Arteixo that won no seats and the 3.43% of the vote.)	1,394	0.08	1 / 4,033	0 / 316
Spanish general election, 2004	2,257	0.12	0 / 350	
Galician parliamentary election, 2005	2,982	0.18	0 / 75	
Spanish local elections, 2007 (Note: Only presented lists in Cangas, Pontevedra, a coalition with Esquerda Unida called Cangas Left Alternative, that won 3 seats (2 FPG and 1 EU) and the 13.11% of the vote, and Vigo, that won no seats and the 0.36% of the votes. The FPG also supported the Iniciativa Polo Morrazo list in Moaña, that won the 9.92% of the votes and 1 seat.)	2,434	0.15	2 / 4,033	0 / 316
Galician parliamentary election, 2009	2,903	0.17	0 / 75	
Spanish local elections, 2011 (Note: Only presented lists in Cangas, Pontevedra in a coalition with Esquerda Unida called Cangas Left Alternative, that won 3 seats (2 FPG and 1 EU) and the 13.11% of the votes, Vigo, that won no seats and the 0.39% of the votes and Redondela, where the list gained no seats and the 3.87% of the vote. In this elections the FPG also supported and participated in the Alternativa Esquerdas Nigrán list in Nigrán, that won 334 (3,5%) votes and no seats.)	3,258	0.20	2 / 4,033	0 / 316
Galician parliamentary election, 2012 (Note: As part of Galician Left Alternative.)	200,828	13.91	0 / 75	
Spanish local elections, 2015 (Note: Difficult to count because the party didn't run on its own lists, but on coalitions. At least 2 councillors in Vigo, 2 in Cangas do Morrazo, 1 in Santiago de Compostela, 1 at A Coruña and 1 in Ribadavia.)			7 / 4,033	0 / 315
Spanish general election, 2015 (Note: As part of En Marea.)	410,698	25.01	1 / 350	
Spanish general election, 2016 (Note: As part of En Marea.)	347,542	22.18	1 / 350	
Galician parliamentary election, 2016 (Note: As part of En Marea.)	273,523	19.07	0 / 75	

== Gallery ==
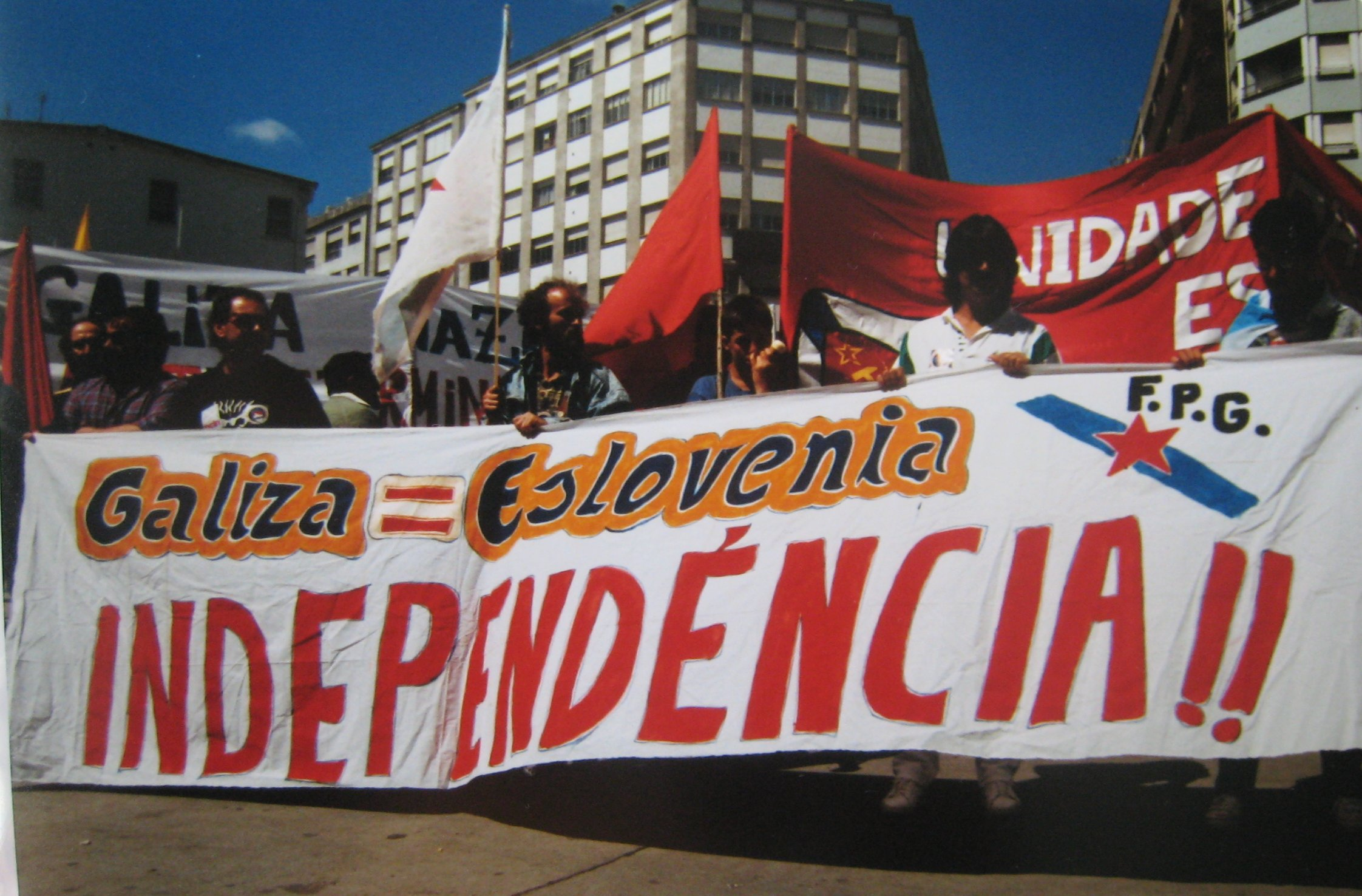
Demonstration in the Día Nacional de Galicia.
