= Communist Party of National Liberation =

Communist Party of National Liberation Partido Comunista de Liberación Nacional
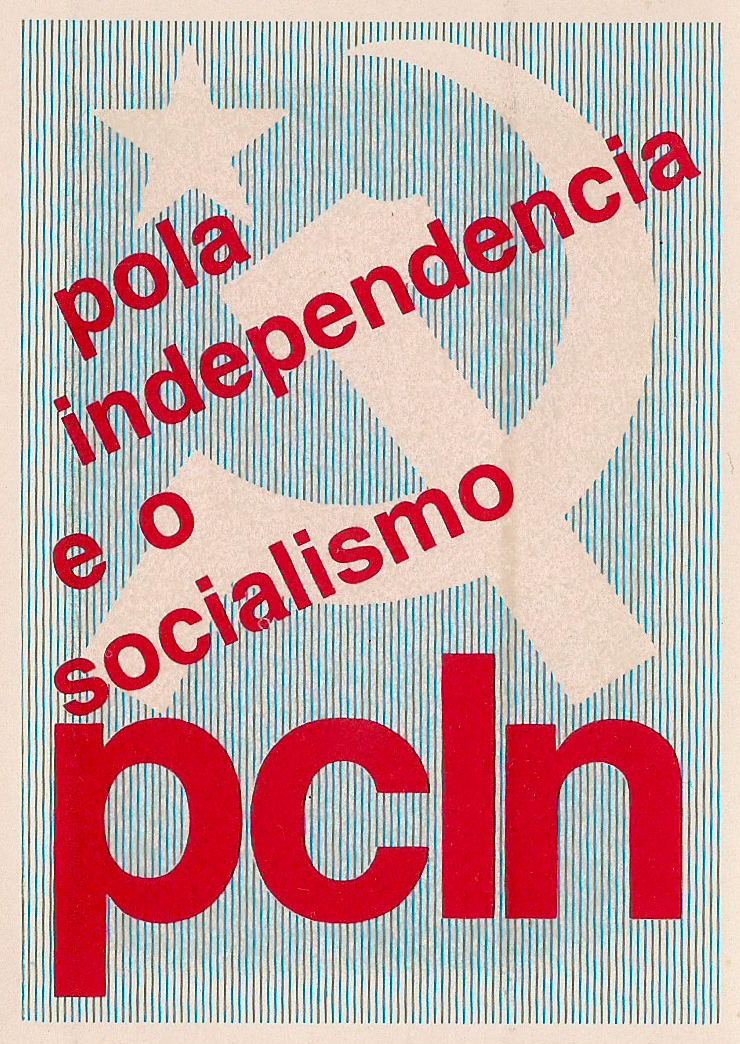
- Spokesperson: Mariano Abalo, Manuel Camaño
- Founded: 1986
- Dissolved: 1990
- Student wing: Galician Revolutionary Students (ERGA)
- Ideology: Communism; Marxism-leninism; Galician independence
- Political position: Far-left
- National affiliation: Galician People's Front
- Trade union affiliation: Intersindical Nacional dos Traballadores Galegos (INTG)
- Colors: Red, white, blue

Communist Party of National Liberation (in Galician: Partido Comunista de Liberación Nacional) was a separatist political party in Galicia, Spain. PCLN was founded on 25 July 1986 by the 22 March Communist Collective (Colectivo Comunista 22 de marzo). The collective had been launched earlier by 13 Central Committee members of the Galician People's Union (UPG) left UPG in protest of the decision of the Galician Nationalist Bloc (BNG, the coalition led by UPG) to participate in the Galician parliament. Front figures of the collective was Mariano Abalo, general secretary of UPG, and Xan Carballo, general secretary of INTG.

== History ==
The 3rd National Assembly of BNG, held in O Carballiño (Ourense) in 1987, expelled PCLN on the grounds that the party had supported Herri Batasuna in elections to the European Parliament.

In 1987 PCLN, Galiza Ceibe-OLN, Nationalist Collective of Trasancos, Nationalist Collective of Vigo, Galician Independentist Groups from Santiago de Compostela, the Iskreiro collective from A Coruña and non-organised individuals launched the Galician Popular Front (FPG). Within FPG, PCLN aimed to keep independence of the member organisations within the front. Galiza Ceibe-OLN wanted to dissolve the member organisations, and make FPG a unitary organisation. The line of PCLN became the leading one within FPG.

PCLN registered itself with the Interior Ministry on 13 February 1988.

Soon divisions surged within FPG. PCLN had certain reservations towards supporting the armed struggle of EGPGC, which Galiza Ceibe-OLN did. An extraordinary National Assembly of FPG was convened. Galiza Ceibe-OLN broke away from FPG and formed the Assembleia do Povo Unido (APU).

In the early 1990s PCLN dissolved itself into FPG, as FPG became a unitary political party.
