= Confederación Xeral de Traballadores Galegos-Intersindical Nacional =

Nationalist trade union centre in Galicia, Spain

CXTG-IN
- Confederación Xeral de Traballadores Galegos-Intersindical Nacional
- Founded: 1985
- Dissolved: 1994
- Location: Spain
- Key people: Fernando Acuña, general secretary

Confederación Xeral de Traballadores Galegos-Intersindical Nacional ('General Confederation of Galician Workers', abbreviated CXTG-IN) was a nationalist trade union centre in Galicia. CXTG-IN was founded in 1985, as a split from the Intersindical Nacional dos Traballadores Galegos (INTG). Fernando Acuña served as the general secretary of the organization. Politically the movement was close to Galician leftwing groups.

== Split from INTG ==
In 1985 INTG was torn by internal divisions, over questions such as the tactics of general strikes and the building of a new political movement. CXTG was founded as a result of this split.

== 1986 elections ==
CXTG-IN participated in the 1986 trade union elections, winning 1,104 delegates (0.62% of the company committees representative seats in all of Spain).

== 1988 general strike ==
On December 14, 1988 a general strike was organized across Spain. In Galicia two separate mobilizations were organized, one by CC.OO. and UGT and one by CXTG and INTG.

== Publication ==
CXTG-IN published the journal Adiante.

== Affiliated unions ==
The CXTG-IN union in the health care sector was the Sindicato Galego da Sanidade-CXTG (SGS-CXTG). The metal workers' union of CXTG was Sindicato Galego do Metal.

The teachers' union of CXTG-IN was called Sindicato Galego do Ensino ea Investigación/CXTG (SGEI-CXTG). SGEI-CXTG won around 10% of the votes in the teachers' union elections of 1987. In 1987 the CXTG teachers' union launched a 'Permanent Seminary for Education for Peace', which later became an independent institution. The Permanent Seminary published didactic materials on human rights, marginalization and eco-pacifism. Through the Permanent Seminary, the CXTG sought to promote non-sexist education.

== Merger with INTG ==
On April 2, 1990 CXTG-IN and INTG signed a cooperation treaty.

INTG and CXTG contested the 1990 trade union elections jointly, winning 3,527 delegates (23.2% of the representative seats in Galicia). On January 18, 1992 CXTG held an extraordinary congress in Narón, with the slogan 'Forward on the path of unity'. The third congress of CXTG was held in Vigo January 16–17, 1993, with the slogan 'Build the future of trade unionism'.

In March 1994 the two trade union centres merged at a founding congress of Confederación Intersindical Galega (CIG). The CXTG-IN leader Acuña became the founding general secretary of the new union.

SGM-CXTG merged with the INTG metal workers' union (FTM), forming CIG-METAL.
