= Xeira =

Marxist-Leninist youth organization

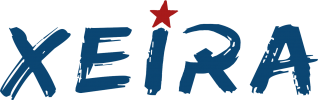
- Ideology: Marxism–Leninism; Galician independence Antifascism; Internationalism
- Website: xeiramocidade.org

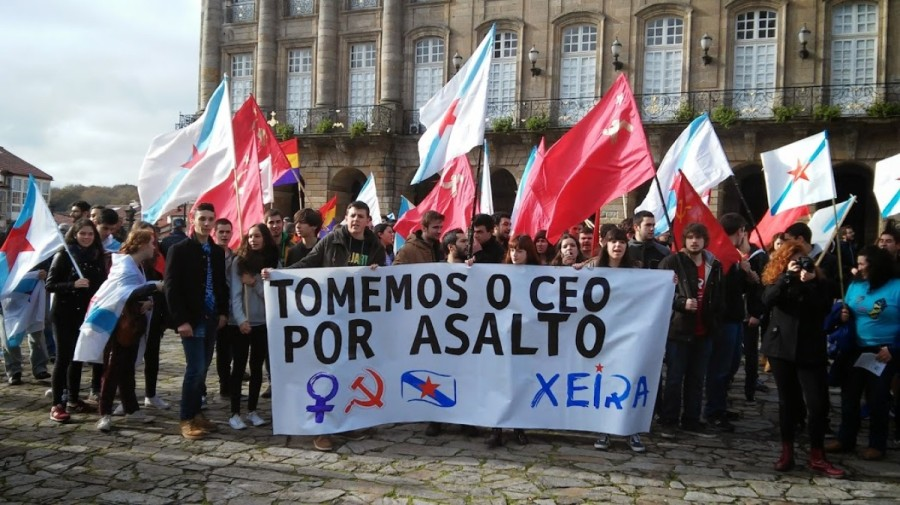
Members of Xeira in a demonstration in Santiago de Compostela (2014).

Xeira (in English: time or sequence) is a Marxist-Leninist political youth organization in Galicia, with a pro-independence stance. It was founded in December 2013 to fill the political space of Adiante-Galician Revolutionary Youth, that self-dissolved weeks before the constitution of Xeira.

It is the youth organization of the Galician People's Front (FPG), one of the organizations participating in Anova-Nationalist Brotherhood.
