= Galician National-Popular Assembly =

Galician National-Popular Assembly Asemblea Nacional-Popular Galega
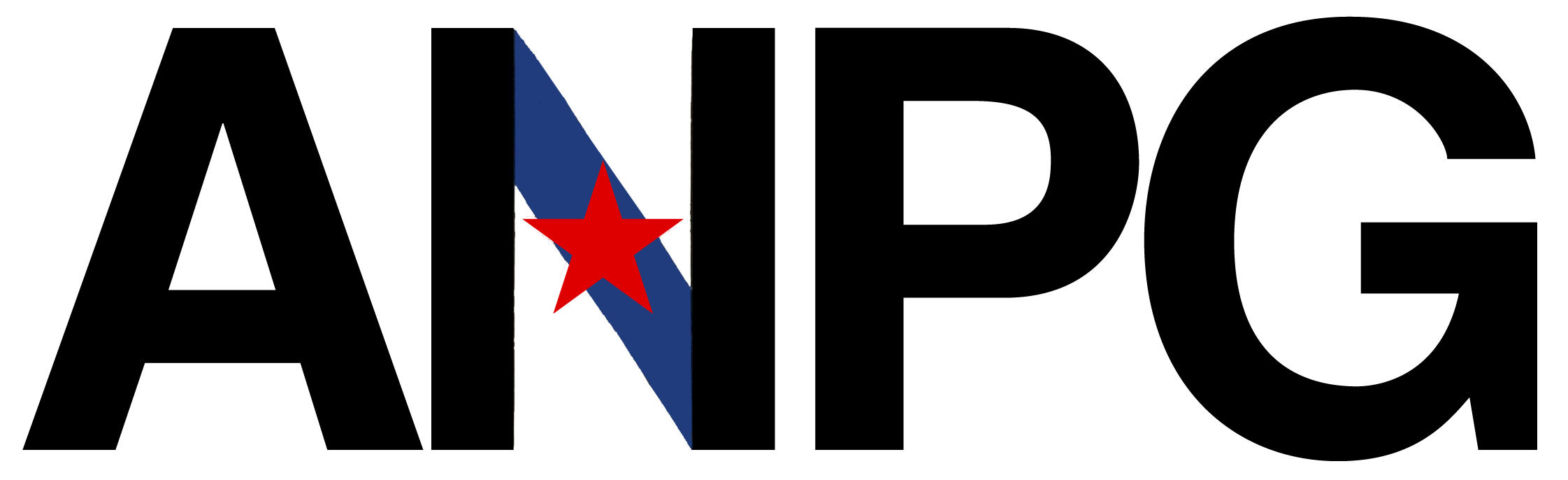
- Leader: Lois Diéguez
- Founded: 1975
- Dissolved: 1982
- Student wing: Galician Revolutionary Students
- Ideology: Galician nationalism Left-wing nationalism Socialism; Antifascism
- National affiliation: BN-PG
- Union affiliation: Intersindical Nacional Galega
- Parliament of Galicia (1981): 1 / 71

The Galician National-Popular Assembly (AN-PG, Asemblea Nacional-Popular Galega in Galician language) was suprapartisan umbrella organization established in 1975 created to coordinate various political fronts of the left-wing Galician nationalist movement.

== History ==
The principles of the AN-PG were self-determination, self-government, anti-colonialism, democracy and the promoting the creation of Galician political forces and had as it main objective the formation of a Galician provisional government after getting power. The AN-PG used the estreleira as its flag and organized protests on July 25, considered as "Día Nacional de Galicia" or the "Day of the Galician Fatherland".

The AN-PG held its first plenary in April 1976, which resulted in the split of a sector that considered the AN-PG excessively linked to the Galician People's Union (UPG). This sector was the Galician People's Assembly. In the III Plenary held in October 1977 the AN-PG approved its statutes, in which the organization was defined as "interclassist, nonpartisan organization directed by a collegiate secretary," in which Lois Diéguez served as spokesman. After the municipal elections of 1979, the AN-PG was restructured to promote greater coordination among its counselors, creating local assemblies.

In 1981 it suffered a major internal crisis that marked the celebration of V Plenary in March 1982, which led to the departure of the organization of two members of the National Direction and a group of 50 militants. Finally, in the last plenary of the organization there were calls for a reformulation of the organizational model. The journey of the AN-PG ended in the same 1982, leading to the formation of the Galician Nationalist Bloc (BNG).

The AN-PG was opposed to the introduction of a Statute of Autonomy for Galiza, that was considered a colony that had to achieve sovereignty through constitutional grounds. The Cultural Front AN-PG was one of the most active sections of the AN-PG, where people like Darius Xohán Cabana, Manuel María, or Xesús Picouto Emiliano Vázquez. The Cultural Front of the AN-PG was one of the most active sections of the Assembly, with members like Darío Xohán Cabana, Manuel María, Emiliano Picouto or Xesús Vázquez.
