= Intersindical Nacional dos Traballadores Galegos =

Left-Wing Spanish Union

INTG
- National Inter-Union of the Galician Workers
- Intersindical Nacional dos Traballadores Galegos
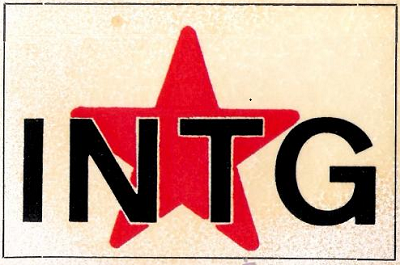
- Logo
- Founded: 1980
- Dissolved: 1993
- Headquarters: Santiago de Compostela, Galicia
- Location: Spain
- Key people: Lois Ríos, first general secretary. Xan Carballo, second general secretary.
- Affiliations: WFTU

The National Inter-Union of the Galician Workers (Galician: Intersindical Nacional dos Traballadores Galegos, INTG) was a Galician union with an anticapitalist, leftist and Galician nationalist ideology, direct heir of the Intersindical Nacional Galega (ING), and precursor of Confederación Intersindical Galega (CIG).

== Foundation ==
The INTG was founded after the 1980 union elections, in which the two galician nationalist unions ran together; the Intersindical Nacional Galega (ING) and the Central de Traballadores Galegos (CTG). Between both, they got 1679 delegates (17.5%), which was more than the 15% of the union representation required by the Spanish law to become a more representative union - which in practice, allows the presence of the union in the negotiations of the collective agreements. The strategic success represented by the unity of the ING and the CTG favored the consolidation of the unification of both unions into a single combative, leftist and Galician nationalist union, which occurred definitely in 1981 when both unions united and formed the INTG.

== Early years (1982–1984) ==
In January 1982, the INTG celebrated its First Congress, where Lois Ríos was elected as general secretary. That same year, the Confederación Sindical Galega, a split of the Spanish Unión Sindical Obrera (USO) and linked with the Galician Socialist Party. In that year's election, the INTG got 1649 delegates (18.5%).

In 1983, Xan Carballo, one of the main figures of the Communist Party of National Liberation (PCLN), was elected as the new general secretary of the INTG.

=== The three strikes against naval conversion ===
After the so-called Pactos de la Castellana, the central government wanted to reconvert the public shipbuilding companies, the INTG, jointly with the Spanish trade unions CCOO and UGT called a strike in the comarca of Vigo, one of the most affected cities by the new state policy., on April 15, 1983. The tension continued to grow in the following months, and the INTG, called for a general strike on February 14, 1984: the first general strike since the Spanish Civil War, which was supported Galician Nationalist Bloc (BNG), Galiza Ceibe-OLN, the PSG-EG, the MCG and the Galician Revolutionary Students. CCOO and UGT also called to strike, but only in the cities of Vigo and Ferrol, where the main Galician shipyards were located.

The success of the strike of February 14 made CCOO join INTG in to the call for another general strike, to be celebrated on July 12. The UGT did not call a strike, due to its closed relationship with the PSOE, which at the time ruled on Spain. Further, the UGT accused CCOO and the INTG of trying to create a climate of violence and unrest in Galicia, and compared the situation in Galicia to that in the Basque Country. The strike was considered a great success by the INTG and the rest of the galician nationalist organizations, which facilitated a third call to a general strike for November 29 of that same year (1984), then against the New social pact (AES) signed between UGT and the Spanish government, which advanced in line of the dismantling of the shipbuilding industry in the Ria de Vigo area. Again, CCOO joined the call of the INTG and the strike was a new success, mobilizing a large number of Galician comarcas and especially in Vigo, where there were more than 100 000 protesters. The three general strikes generated a considerable increase in support for nationalist unionism through the figure of INTG.

== The split of the 1984 and the recovery of 1990 ==
Despite the great success of the general strikes led by the INTG, that same year of 1984 a critical internal current with the union leadership and its general secretary, Xan Carballo, emerged. This current, called Converxencia Sindical Nacionalista (CSN), was linked with the PSG-EG, founded that year and directed by Camilo Nogueira. The CSN decided to abandon the INTG in 1985, forming the Confederación Xeral de Traballadores Galegos-Intersindical Nacional (CXTG), which celebrated in October of that year its first Congress. In it, Fernando Acuña was elected secretary general of the new union. In the union elections of 1986, the CXTG won 1087 delegates and the INTG 1067 delegates.

On the other hand, the relationship with CXTG also produced a fracture inside the INTG, that explained the four different candidates to the internal elections in the Third Congress, held in 1987. In it, the list close to the BNG reached 6 representatives, the list close to the FPG reached 3 representatives and the candidacy close to the gained APU 1 representative. Manuel Mera was elected secretary general.

== Recovering unity: creation of the CIG ==
On April 2, 1990, the INTG and CXTG made an unified list to the union elections, known as the Converxencia Intersindical Galega.

After the unified candidacy in 1990, there was an organic unification in 1993, giving birth to the Confederación Intersindical Galega. Fernando Acuña, who came from the CXTG, and that was linked to the Galician Unity party, was appointed as the general secretary in the first two conferences of the union.
