= Liga Armada Galega =

Liga Armada Galega Galician Armed League
- Dates active: 1978–1980
- Active regions: Galicia
- Ideology: Marxism-leninism
- Status: Disarticulated

The Galician Armed League (Liga Armada Galega in Galician language) was an armed organization formed by former members of the GRAPO. They injured two policemen in 1978, and claimed to have killed a Guardia Civil the same year in Santiago de Compostela, though the GRAPO also claimed the murder. The group was completed disbanded in 1980.

The punk band Siniestro Total mentions this organization in one of their most emblematic songs: "Miña Terra Galega".

== See also ==
- Exército Guerrilheiro do Povo Galego Ceive

== Sources ==
- Various authors. A Gran Historia de Galicia XVI: a Galicia autónoma (dende a Transición). Volume 1: A Transición en Galicia, Arrecife Edicións Galegas/La Voz de Galicia, 2007, A Coruña.
- Rios Bergantinhos, Noa. A esquerda independentista galega, (1977–1995). Abrente Editora, Santiago de Compostela, 2002.
