= Galician Workers' Party =

Galician Workers' Party Partido Obreiro Galego
- Leader: Camilo Nogueira
- Founded: October 3, 1977
- Dissolved: November 1, 1980
- Merger of: Galician People's Assembly and independents.
- Succeeded by: Galician Left
- Membership: Around 200
- Ideology: Socialism; Galician nationalism Left-wing nationalism Marxism
- National affiliation: Galician Unity (1979-1980)

Galician Workers' Party (in Galician: Partido Obreiro Galego) was a political party in Galicia, Spain.

== History ==
POG was founded in October 1977, following a split from the Galician National-Popular Bloc (BN-PG). POG was led by Camilo Nogueira and Xan López Facal. The founders of POG saw autonomy as a first step towards Galician self-rule. POG attracted members from various parties, like Communist Movement of Galicia, Galician Socialist Party, Communist Party of Galicia and Workers Party of Spain. The majority of the membership of the Galician People's Assembly also entered the new party.

At its peak POG had around 200 members, mainly based in Vigo and Santiago de Compostela.

In the 1979 general and municipal elections POG formed part of the coalition Galician Unity (Unidade Galega). In the 1980 plebiscite on the Galician Statute, POG advocated a blank vote.

In December 1980 the party was reconstructed as Galician Left (Esquerda Galega).

== Sources ==
- Manuel Anxo Fernández Baz, A formación do nacionalismo galego contemporáneo (1963-1984), Laiovento, 2003.
- Beramendi, X.G. (2007): De provincia a nación. Historia do galeguismo político. Xerais, Vigo
