= Confederación Intersindical Galega =

CIG
- Galician Unions Confederacy
- Confederación Intersindical Galega
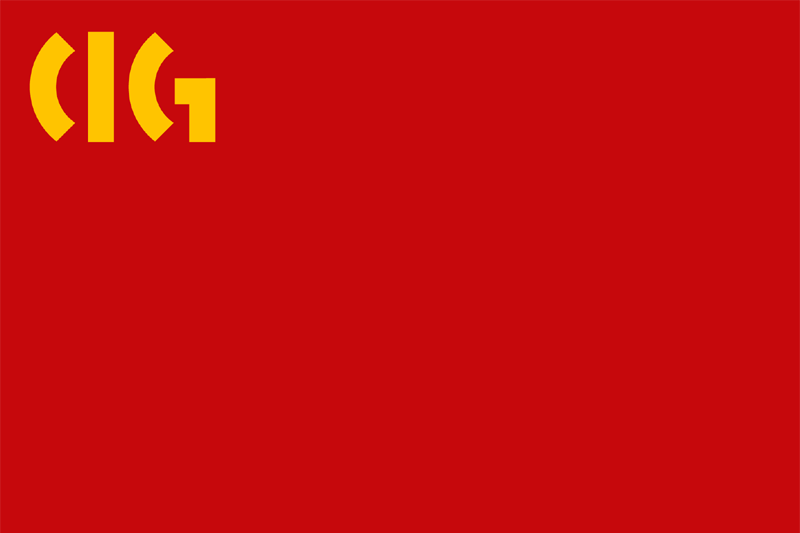
- Logo
- Founded: 1993
- Headquarters: Santiago de Compostela, Galicia
- Location: Spain
- Members: more than 80,000
- Key people: Paulo Carril, general secretary
- Affiliations: WFTU
- Website: galizacig.gal

The Galician Unions Confederacy (Galician: Confederación Intersindical Galega, CIG) is a trade union that was created after the merge of two previous unions: the INTG and the CXTG. It has a Galician nationalist and socialist ideology and generally defends a combative labour model, as opposed to the perceived mild tactics of the other two main unions in Galicia, CCOO and the UGT. The union has organized 6 general strikes in Galicia since its creation.

Currently the CIG has 4,480 labour delegates (28.28% of the total) and more than 80,000 members, being the largest union in Galicia both in membership and delegates.

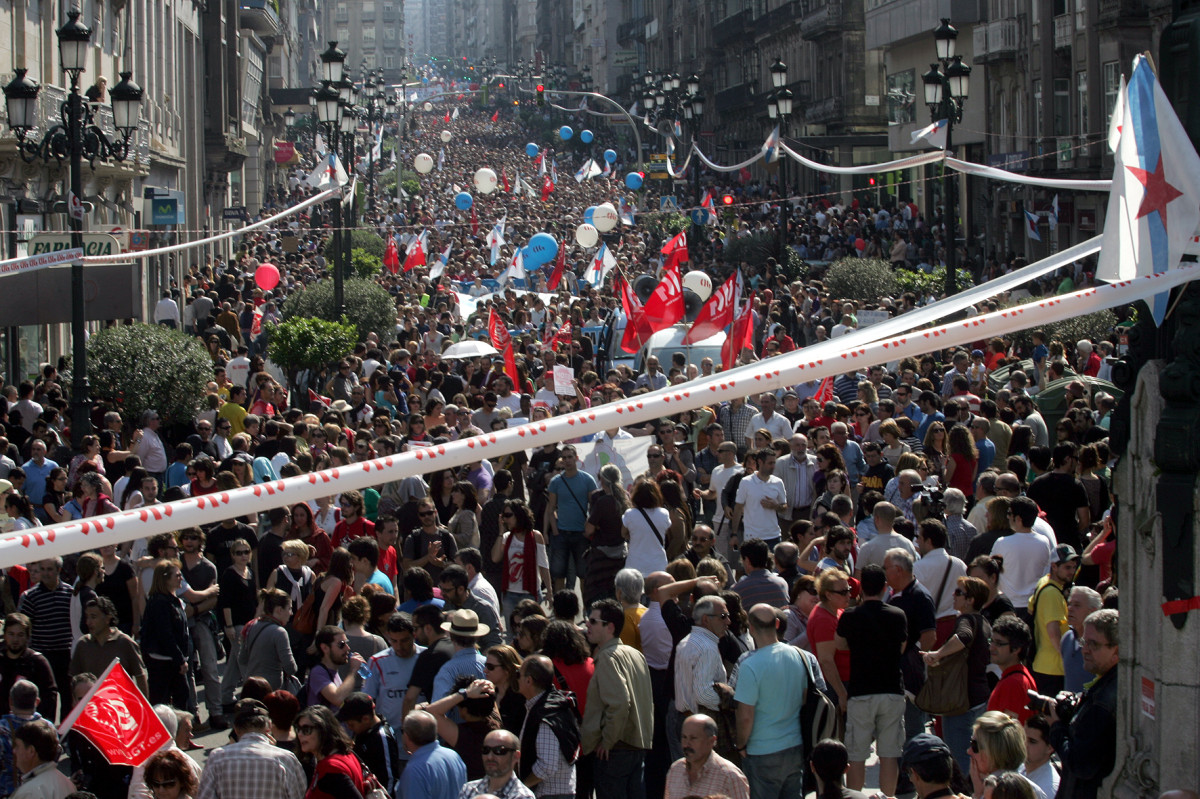
CIG demonstration in Vigo

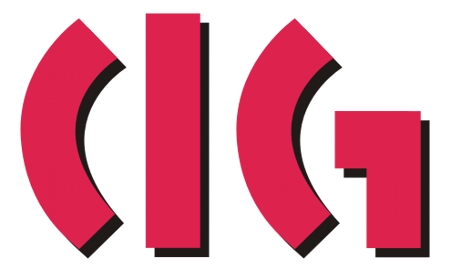
CIG logo

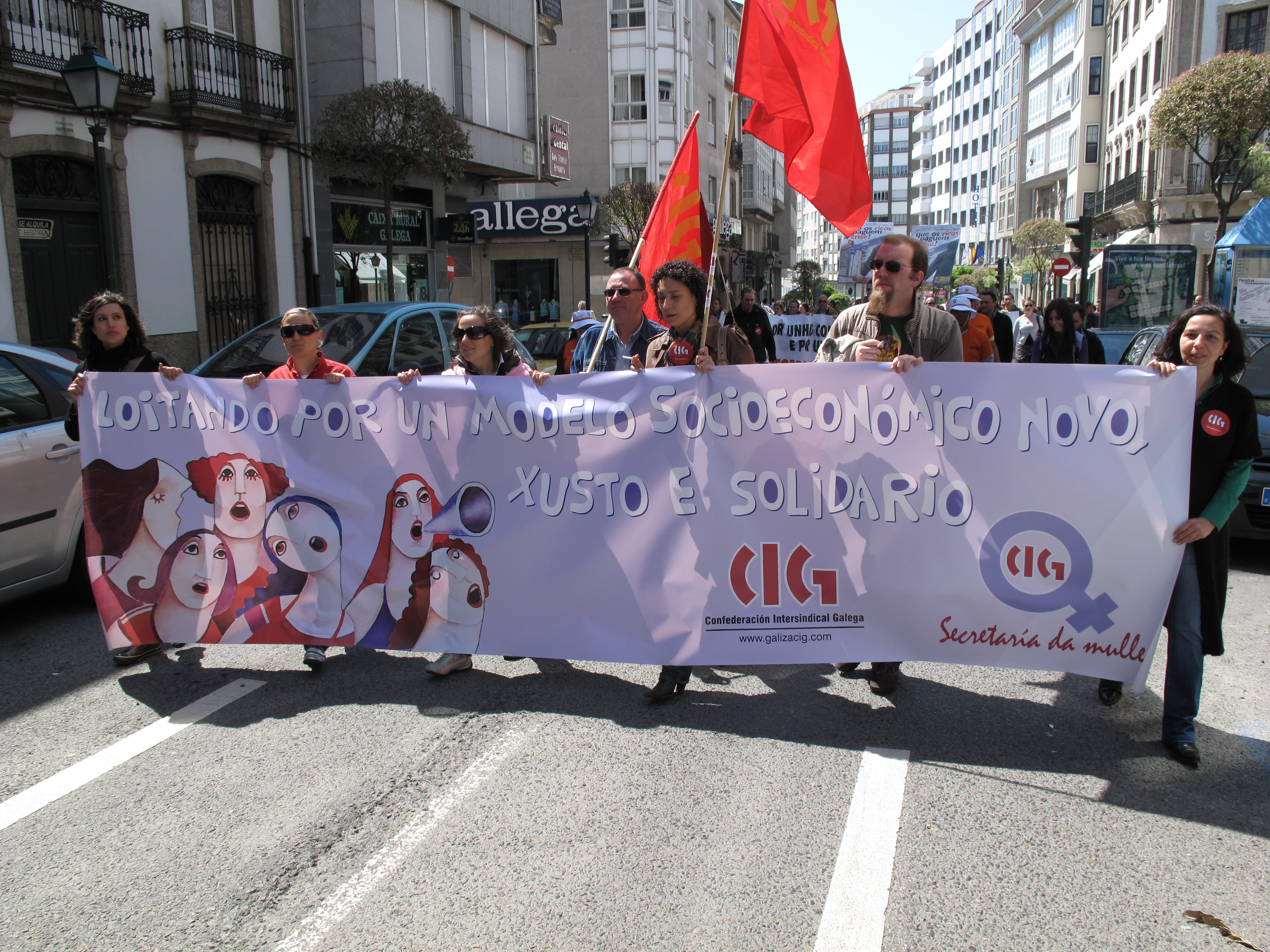
CIG in the International Workers' Day in Santiago de Compostela.
