= Intersindical Nacional Galega =

ING
- Galician National Inter-Union
- Intersindical Nacional Galega
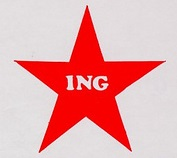
- Logo
- Founded: 1977
- Dissolved: 1981
- Headquarters: Santiago de Compostela, Galiza
- Location: Spain
- Key people: Francisco García Montes, Secretary General.
- Affiliations: WFTU

The Intersindical Nacional Galega (Galician National Inter-Union in English language) was a nationalist and anticapitalist galician union formed in March 1977 as a result of the merge of the Galician Workers Union, UTEG, UTSG, UTBG, STGAP and the SGTM. Francisco García Montes was elected Secretary General. The ING celebrated its first Congress in October 1977.

In the first union elections of 1978 the ING became the third most voted union in Galiza, with 722 elected delegates (13.5%). In September 1980 the ING merged with the Central de Traballadores Galegos, achieving then the most representative union status, exceeding the 15% required and gaining 1,679 delegates (17.5%). In 1981 the union was refounded and renamed as the INTG.
