= Xosé Luís Méndez Ferrín =

Galician writer & poet (1938–2026)

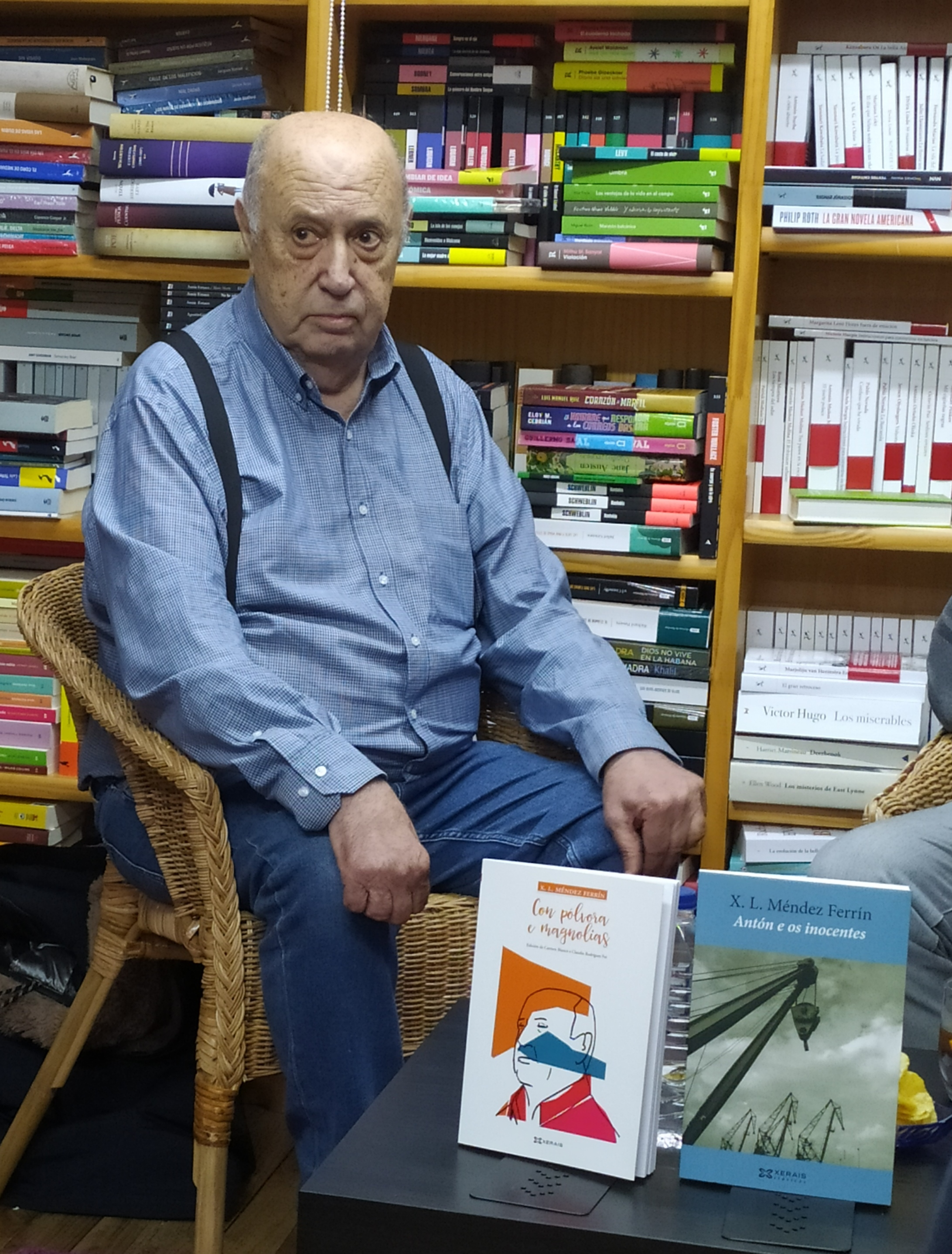
2020

Xosé Luís Méndez Ferrín (7 August 1938 – 18 November 2026) was a Galician writer and poet and is widely considered the highest representative of contemporary Galician literature. A doctor in philology, he studied philosophy at the University of Santiago de Compostela and Romanic philology at the University of Madrid.

He was born in Ourense. He taught literature at the Instituto Santa Irene in Vigo. He also wrote for the daily newspaper Faro de Vigo and directed the quarterly political critic magazine A Trabe Ouro. Méndez Ferrín was a member of the Real Academia Galega (Galician Royal Academy). He was the president of that Academy from January 2010 until February 2013, when he resigned, accused of hiring relatives. On 1 March 2013 he resigned his chair of academic. He was Doctor Honoris Causa of the University of Vigo.

He was proposed for the Nobel Prize in literature by the Galician Writers Association in 1999. He has been awarded the Galician Critics Prize, Spanish Critics Prize and National Critics Prize.

Méndez Ferrín died in Vigo on 18 November 2026, aged 88.

== Politics ==
Méndez Ferrín had an active political activist life; he supported political and social initiatives such as Redes Escarlata and was a member of the nationalist literary group Brais Pinto.

He was a founding member of Unión do Povo Galego (Union of the Galician People) and centered in a Marxist independentist ideology. Also member of Frente Popular Galega (Popular Galician Front) and founder of Galiza Ceibe-OLN.

== Literary work ==
As a poet he became notorious with his first work Voce na néboa (Voice in the Fog) 1957.

- Antoloxía Popular (transl. Popular Anthology), 1972, with the pseudonym Heriberto Bens.
- Sirventés pola destrucción de Occitania (transl. Servants for the Destruction of Occitania), 1975.
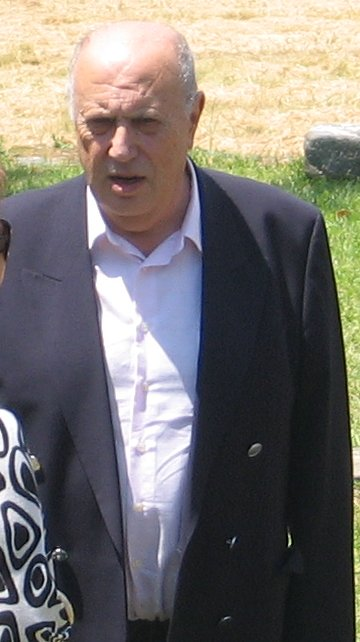
- Xosé Luís Méndez Ferrín
  Con pólvora e magnolias (transl. With Gunpowder and Magnolias), 1977.
- Poesía enteira de Heriberto Bens (transl. Complete Poetry of Heriberto Bens), 1980.
- O fin dun canto (transl. The End of a Song), 1982.
- Erótica (transl. Erotic), 1992.
- Estirpe (transl. Lineage), 1994.
- O outro (transl. The Other One), 2002.
- Contra Maquieiro (transl. Against Maquieiro), 2005

His works in prose include narrative and essay:

- Percival e outras historias (transl. Percival and Other Stories), 1958.
- O crepúsculo e as formigas (transl. The twilight and the Ants), 1961.
- Arrabaldo do norte (transl. Northern Outskirts), 1964.
- Retorno a Tagen Ata (transl. Return to Tagen Ata), 1971.
- Elipsis e outras sombras (transl. Ellipsis and Other Shadows), 1974.
- Antón e os inocentes (transl. Antón and the Innocents), 1976.
- Crónica de nós (transl. Chronicles of Us), 1980.
- Amor de Artur (transl. The Love of Artur), 1982.
- Arnoia, Arnoia, 1985.
- Bretaña, Esmeraldina (transl. Brittany, Emerald), 1987.
- De Pondal a Novoneyra (transl. From Pondal to Novoneyra), 1984.
- Arraianos (transl. Borderlanders), 1991
- No ventre do silencio (transl. Inside the Womb of the Silence), 1999.
