= Galician People's Union =

Galician People's Union Unión do Povo Galego (Note: The name of the party is still written in the old pre-2003 AS-PG orthographic rules. In modern orthographic norm the name of the party is written as Unión do Pobo Galego.)
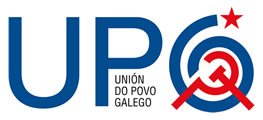
- Secretary-General: Néstor Rego
- Founder: Xosé Luís Méndez Ferrín; Bautista Álvarez; Reimundo Patiño; Xosé Antonio Arjona
- Founded: November 1963
- Headquarters: Santiago de Compostela, Spain
- Newspaper: Terra e tempo
- Youth wing: Union of the Galician Youth
- Ideology: Communism; Marxism–Leninism; Galician nationalism
- Political position: Far-left
- Regional affiliation: Galician National-Popular Bloc (1977–1982); Galician Nationalist Bloc
- Colors: Red
- Galician Parliament: 4 / 75

Website
- upg.gal

The Galician People's Union (Galician: Unión do Povo Galego (Note: The name of the party is still written in the old pre-2003 AS-PG orthographic rules. In modern orthographic norm the name of the party is written as Unión do Pobo Galego.)) is a Galician nationalist and Marxist-Leninist political party, and is one of the registered political parties of Spain. The party publishes the magazine Terra e Tempo, and the secretary general is Néstor Rego.

It was founded in 1964 with the intention of the independence of Galicia and its transformation into a socialist state. It caused the creation of nationalist fronts such as the Galician National-Popular Assembly and the Bloque Nacionalista Galego. Since 1982 it is one of the parties in the coalition. The current National Spokesperson (Ana Pontón) of the BNG is a member of the UPG.

== History ==
=== First foundation ===
In November 1963, Xosé Luís Méndez Ferrín, Bautista Álvarez, Reimundo Patiño and Xosé Antonio Arjona, members of the literary group Brais Pinto, founded Unión do Pobo Galego as a communist and nationalist political party.

=== Refoundation ===
In 1964 the Youth Council, under the direction of Ramón Piñeiro, expelled the leftist sector, which proceeded to refound the UPG in Santiago de Compostela on July 25, 1964, integrating the Brais Pinto group, former militants of the Federation of the Galicianist Youth (Note: Youth wing of the original Galicianist Party.) (as Celso Emilio Ferreiro) and the Communist Party of Spain (Luís Soto) and independent left nationalists, a total no more than 25 people. In the first two years the party activities are reduced to sporadic contacts of its members and the publication of the journal Terra e Tempo, in which its first program was published in 1965:

U.P.G. (Galician People's Union)

A front that proposes to all Galicians to support the next minimum 10 principles:

1. Galiza is a nation, and as such has the right to self-determination.
2. The galician people shall exercise the power in Galiza.
3. The means of production, distribution and credit belong to the people.
4. The collectivization of the rural land will start with a cooperative stage, as a previous phase to more developed forms of socialization.
5. The small artisan business and industry will be concentrated in higher production units.
6. The large capitalist enterprise will be socialized in an immediate.
7. The administrative organization of the galician rural areas shall have as the core division the parish, which will be integrated in the Bisbarras. The urban territory shall be administered by concellos (municipalities), composed of districts.
8. The education will be at the service of the people.
9. The official language of Galiza will be the galician.
10. The Galician national liberation doesn't discard a federation of Galiza with other peoples of the Iberian Peninsula.

— The Ten Points of the UPG, Terra e Tempo Nº1

At first the UPG had a line of collaboration with the PCE, but this collaboration did not last long, and the UPG and the PCE became rivals for the hegemony in the galician communist movement. The PCE was accused by the UPG of españolismo (Spanish nationalism/Hispanocentrism). The opposition to the construction of the dam of Castrelo de Miño (1966) was the first major public action of the UPG. The UPG organized the local peasants in Assault brigades that torched and burned the machinery. The UPG also helped the local peasants through an advocate of the organization.

In 1971 the expulsion of Xosé Torres and his followers, who joined the Communist Movement of Spain, left the organization almost without militants in Ferrol and Santiago de Compostela. Vigo thus became the core of an organization which at that time did not exceed 50 members.

=== Expansion ===
It is not until the formation of Galician Revolutionary Students (ERGA) by Manuel Mera in 1972 when the UPG started to increase its social base. The same year, the 10 of march, the Spanish police killed 2 workers in a demonstration in Ferrol. This led to a series of strikes and demonstrations in all Galiza in solidarity with the Ferrol workers. This movement culminate in the 1972 General Strike in Vigo, when the city was paralyzed for 20 days. The UPG was very involved in the strike and took contact with two organizations of Vigo: Galicia Socialista and Organización Obreira. The first one was a marxist group that organized workers in some factories in the city and the second one was a radical split from CCOO. Galicia Socialista and a sector of Organización Obreira (Note: The other sector would eventually join the PCE (r).) joined the UPG. This helped the UPG to have a far more important role among the working class and helped the organization to increase its membership significantly. The strike ended the 26 of September, with the final result of 6,000 workers fired. After a new wave of protest finally the number of fired workers went down to 400. Although the strike failed in its goals, the UPG left this period significantly strengthened, more militants, more prestige among the workers and much more experience. This helped the UPG to become the main alternative to the Communist Party of Galicia among the opposition to the Francoist State in Galicia.

This was followed in the spring of 1973 by the formation of the Fronte Obreira (Workers Front), directed by Moncho Reboiras and that acted as a union liked to the party. The following year Comisións Labregas was created to organiza the peasants.

In the context of the relationships established with other nationalist parties without states in Europe, the UPG signed in February 1974, with the Breton Democratic Union and the Irish republican movement (which comprised the Provisional Irish Republican Army and the Sinn Féin) the Charter of Brest. In that chart the signing organizations defended the right to self-determination of the peoples of Europe to a future Socialist Europe of the Peoples. The document was later also signed by Herriko Alderdi Sozialista, Cymru Goch, PSAN-Provisional, Esquerra Catalana dels Treballadors, Su Populu Sardu and Lucha Occitana. The UPG also developed contacts after the Carnation Revolution (April 25, 1974) with forces of the Portuguese radical left, specially the Liga de Unidade e Ação Revolucionária (LUAR), the Revolutionary Party of the Proletariat – Revolutionary Brigades (PRP-BR) or the Movement of the Armed Forces (MFA).

Moreover, since 1970 there were voices within the party that postulated the need for an armed phase in the context of the national-popular revolution and with the support of ETA (pm) the UPG formed the Fronte Armada (FA, Armed Front. No more than 10 people). The FA did some robberies and some minor armed actions, but in August 1975 the police killed Moncho Reboiras and arrested 4 members of the armed group. After these events the party abandoned the armed struggle.

=== Transition ===
After the Ferrol events the party leadership exiled in Portugal and although some joint events still be carried with ETA, the UPG stopped the armed actions, giving priority to the political action. The UPG supported the Galician National-Popular Assembly (AN-PG), which was presented publicly in January 1976 and was intended to unite the different left-wing galician nationalist organizations and to lead the formation of a provisional Galician government after taking power. At the same time, also in January 1976, on the initiative of the UPG, the Galician Political Forces Council was formed, and was joined by the PSG, the Galician Social Democratic Party and the UPG itself. The Consello published in April 1976 the Bases Constitucionais (Constitutional Bases), in which the right to self-determination of Galicia was demanded. Later, the Carlist Party and the Communist Movement of Galicia (MCG) entered the consello. In November the CFPG entered in a crisis after the inclusion of the MCG, which refused to leave CCOO to enter the Sindicato Obreiro Galego (Note: Galician Workers Union, the Galician nationalist union at the time.) as requested by the UPG. As a result, the UPG and the PGSD left the CFPG.

To concur to the first democratic elections in 1977, the UPG articulated a nationalist front, the Galician National-Popular Bloc (BN-PG), that was integrated by the UPG and the AN-PG. The BN-PG gained only 22,771 votes (2.02%). After the elections the sector headed by Camilo Nogueira Román who formed the Galician Workers' Party split. Previously, the hardline militant Xosé Luís Méndez Ferrín, who had been expelled from the direction of UPG, left the party and accused the UPG of rightism, progressive compliance with the Spanish institutions and interclassism. Méndez Ferrín founded in 1977 a new party: the Galician People's Union-Proletarian Line. In the Spanish constitutional referendum of 1978 the UPG supported a No vote. In the 1979 elections the UPG supported again the BN-PG, gaining 60,889 votes, the 6% of the vote in Galiza, making a hughe gain since the first elections, although, again the BN-PG didn't get representants in the Spanish Congress. The progressive growth of the popular support to the BN-PG was confirmed by the results of the local elections of the same year. The BN-PG won the 7.32% of the vote in all Galiza (78,216 votes) and gained 258 town councillors and 9 mayors.

Between the months of April and May in 1981 the UPG experienced an internal crisis between the supporters of professionalizing and giving more weight to the BN-PG, that were the minority, and those who opposed them, the majority. The crisis ended with the expulsion of the minority sector (they were the majority, however, in Vigo), led by Francisco García Montes, Secretary General of the INTG; Requeixo Bernardo Fernandez, general secretary of Comisións Labregas and Agustín Malvido.

After these dissensions, the UPG turned left and supported campaigns for the ETA prisoners, increased its relations with Herri Batasuna and even made joint events with the Communist Party of Spain (Reconstituted), the political wing of the GRAPO. In February 1982 the centrist wing of the party left the UPG, led by Pedro Luaces (former secretary general) and strong in Lugo. After the victory of the PSOE in the elections of 1982, the UPG declared himself opposed to any cooperation, since they saw the socialist government as the kind face of capitalism. In this environment, in December 1983 Mariano Abalo was elected secretary general of the UPG.

=== Acceptance of the institutions ===
In 1986, the UPG, and the Galician Nationalist Bloc (in which the BN-PG had been transformed) agreed to participate in the institutions, this led Xosé Manuel Beiras to the Galician parliament to promise to act according to the Constitution. This led to the split in July 1986 of 13 Central Committee members and a few dozen militants who founded the Communist Party of National Liberation. Among the founders of the new party there were Mariano Abalo, Xan Carballo and Ramiro Oubiña. Since that moment, the workplace of the UPG has been the Galician Nationalist Bloc. With the BNG the UPG got important institutional positions: Members of the Parliament of Galicia, deputies in the Spanish Congress, provincial deputies, mayors and numerous town council members, always under the banner of the BNG.

The party has also focused on social work through the nationalist unionism, unified under the banner Confederación Intersindical Galega (CIG). It held its Eleventh National Congress in January 2005 in Santiago de Compostela. Being re-elected Secretary General Francisco Rodríguez Sánchez. On 15 and 16 November the XII Congress was held in Santiago de Compostela with the slogan: O nacionalismo, a alternativa á globalización. Vivir, traballar e producir na nosa Terra ("Nationalism, the alternative to globalization. Living, working and producing in our land").
