= Día Nacional de Galicia =

National holiday of Galicia, Spain

Dia Nacional de Galicia
- Flag of Galicia
- Official name: Día Nacional de Galicia
- Also called: Día da Patria Galega, Día de Galicia
- Observed by: Galicia
- Date: 25 July
- Next time: 25 July 2026
- Frequency: annual
- Related to: Feast of Saint James

Dia Nacional de Galicia ("National Day of Galicia") is when the autonomous community of Galicia in Spain celebrates its national holiday. It falls on 25 July.

It is also called Día da Patria Galega ("Day of the Galician Fatherland"), or simply Día de Galicia ("Galicia Day"), but the official full denomination is the "National Day of Galicia", as established by the Galician government in 1979.

== History of the celebration ==
The origins of the celebration can be traced back to 1919, when the Assembly of the Galicianist organization Irmandades da Fala met in the Galician capital, Santiago de Compostela. It was then decided to celebrate the National Day on 25 July the following year. The date was chosen as it is the Feast of Saint James, patron saint of both Galicia and the Galician capital city.

It was celebrated openly until the Francoist dictatorship (1939–1977), when any display of non-Spanish nationalism was prohibited. During that time the National Day would still be celebrated as such by the Galician emigrant communities abroad. In Galicia, the Galicianists would gather with the pretext of offering a Mass for Galician poet and literary icon Rosalia de Castro. The Francoist regime institutionalized the religious celebration of Saint James as the "patron saint of Spain".

Nonetheless, from 1968 Galicianists attempted to celebrate the day in Compostela, still during the dictatorship. The Partido Socialista de Galicia ("Galician Socialist Party") and the Unión do Povo Galego ("Galician People's Union") called for public political demonstrations every 25 July. These demonstrations would invariably result in riots with the Spanish police. Even during the first years of democracy, after 1977, any demonstration organised by the Asemblea Nacional-Popular Galega and the BN-PG (later transformed into the Galician Nationalist Bloc) would still be forbidden. It is only during the mid-1980s when the National Day started to, gradually, be celebrated with some degree of normality. Although, the events from the late 1960s onwards transformed the National Day celebrations into a date with deep political implications. At present, Galician political parties (mostly nationalist, but not only) organise large demonstrations at the capital city and/or a number of activities to commemorate the day.

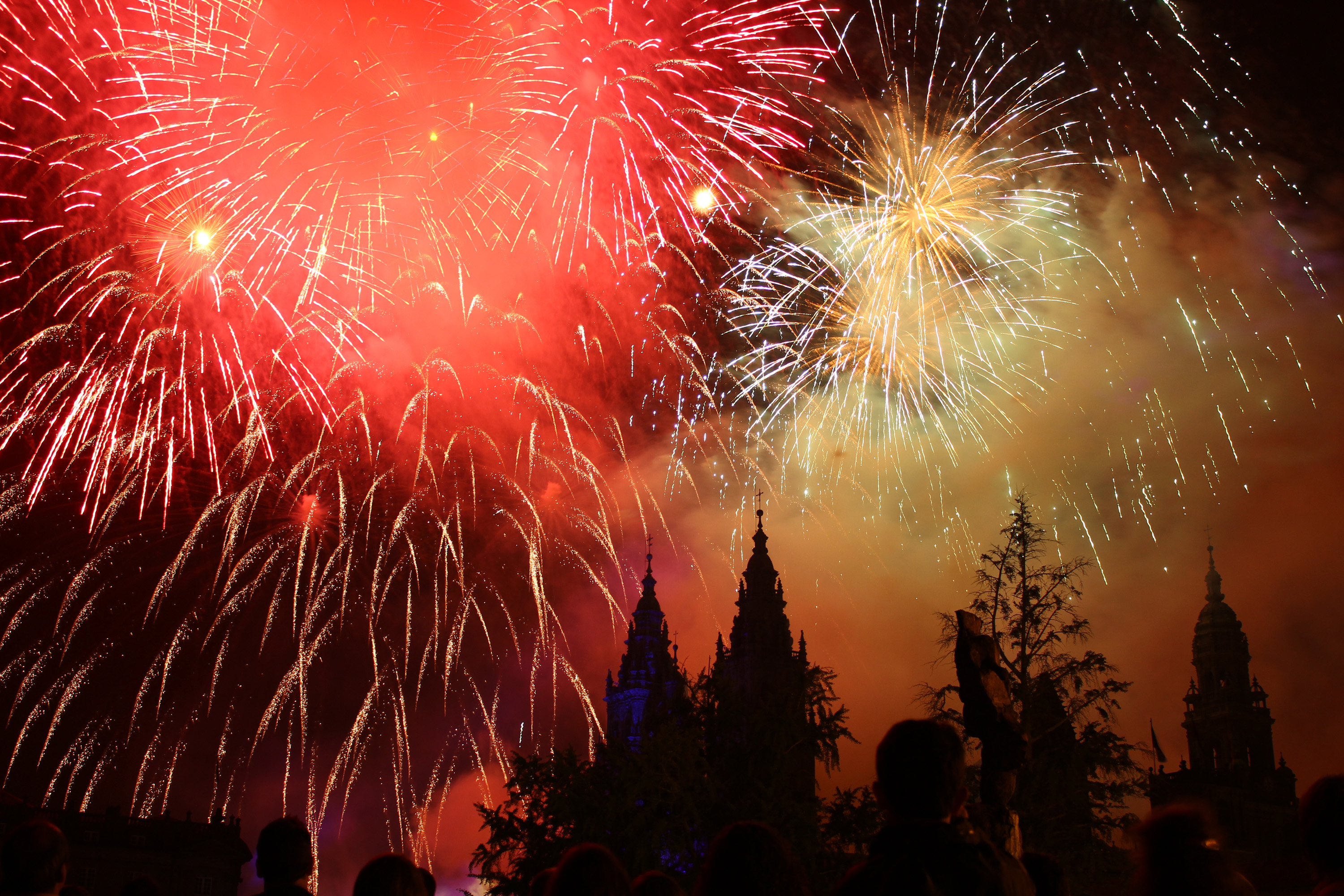
Fireworks in Santiago de Compostela, known as Fogos do Apóstolo.

The political and institutional activities are normally all based in Santiago de Compostela, and the day is an official public holiday celebrated with solemnity by the Galician government. Apart from that, a number of festivities take place from the night of the 24th until high hours in the morning of the 26th, celebrated by many.

The 2013 festivities in Santiago de Compostela were canceled due to the fatal train crash that occurred the previous day.

== See also ==
- Galician people
- History of Galicia
- Timeline of Galician history
- Galician nationalism
- Irmandades da Fala
