= Galician Revolutionary Students =

Galician Revolutionary Students Estudantes Revolucionarios Galegos
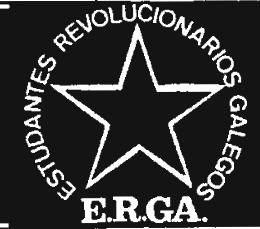
- Founded: 1972
- Dissolved: 1988
- Headquarters: Santiago de Compostela, Galicia
- Ideology: Galician nationalism Socialism; Galician independence Antifascism
- Mother party: Galician People's Union and the Galician Nationalist Bloc

Galician Revolutionary Students (in Galician: Estudantes Revolucionarios Galegos) was a leftwing nationalist students organization in Galicia, Spain. ERGA functioned as the students wing of the Galician People's Union (UPG). ERGA was founded in 1972. ERGA published a monthly, Lume. ERGA was the first mass organization of nationalism after the Spanish Civil War, got a broad presence in the universities and high schools of Galiza and formed future UPG leaders and militants.

== History ==
ERGA was founded on the initiative of the Galician People's Union (UPG), in a climate of tension that followed the strikes at the University of Santiago de Compostela and the death of a student, Chema Fuentes, by the police in December 1972. The initiative was commissioned to Manuel Mera, that had just arrived from Argentina and knew the experience of the Maoist Communist Vanguard university organization, that had to organize an organization that could put together university and high school students. In Santiago de Compostela, with the help of supporters UPG, ERGA was able to capture a group of university students and secured the incorporation of some members of the Communist Movement of Galicia, including Elvira Souto. A few months later ERGA reached 40 militants, including Carreira Anselmo López, Alfredo Suárez Canal and Chus Pato. In 1976 the organization held his first assembly and in 1977 the second.

In January 1978 the I Congress was attended by 1,000 delegates and organized a permanent direction. When the Galician Nationalist Bloc (BNG) was formed in 1982, ERGA was integrated in it. ERGA had the organ of the Lume newsletter published its first issue in February 1973, ERGA was the first mass organization of nationalism after the civil war, got a broad presence in universities and high schools of Galiza and "trained" future leaders of the UPG and the BNG. The organization was illegal for almost all its existence. It was only legalized in early 1988, a few months before its self-dissolution.

In 1988 ERGA merged into the youth wing of the Galician Nationalist Bloc (BNG), Galiza Nova.

== Bibliography ==
- Various authors. ERGA. Un lume que prendeu. Edicións Terra e Tempo, Compostela, 1999. Authorized PDF version here (in Galician language).
- Beramendi, X.G. and Núñez Seixas, X.M. (1996): O nacionalismo galego. A Nosa Terra, Vigo
- Beramendi, X.G. (2007): De provincia a nación. Historia do galeguismo político. Xerais, Vigo
