= A Coruña (Parliament of Galicia constituency) =

Coordinates: 43°22′N 8°24′W

- Parliament of Galicia; Electoral constituency
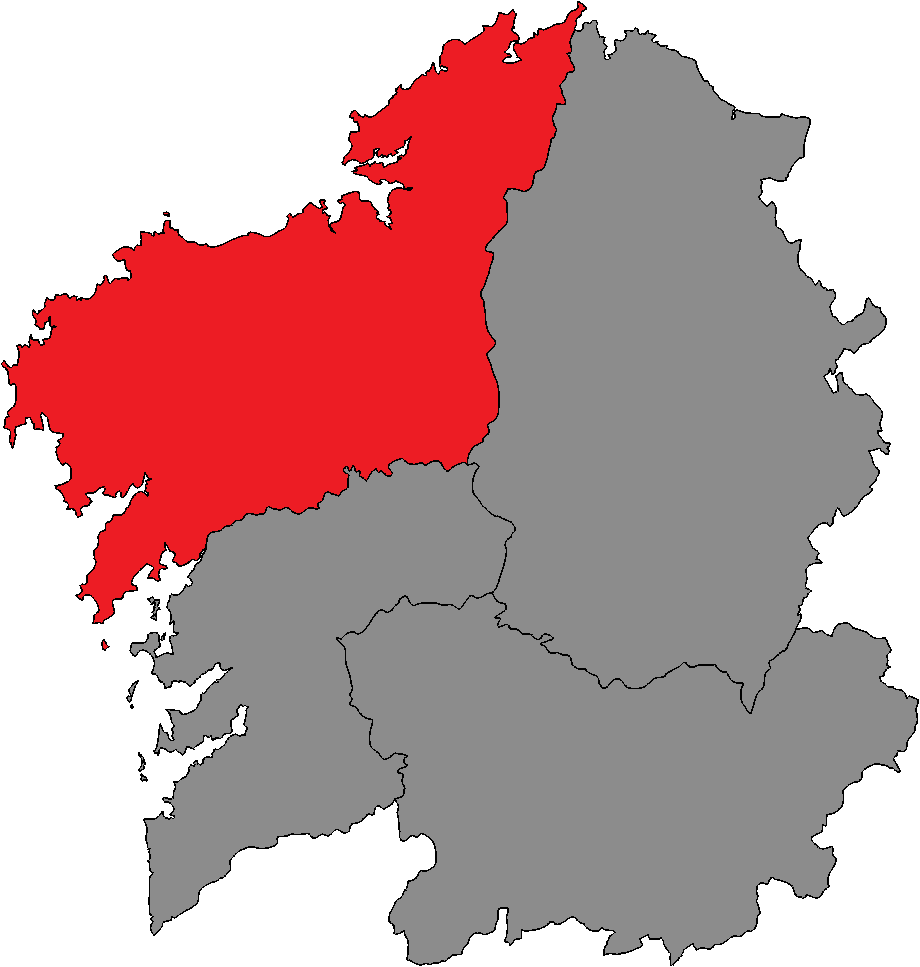
- Location of A Coruña within Galicia
- Province: A Coruña
- Autonomous community: Galicia
- Population: ▲1,128,320 (2024)
- Electorate: ▲1,088,529 (2024)
- Major settlements: A Coruña, Santiago de Compostela, Ferrol

Current constituency
- Created: 1981
- Seats: 22 (1981–1989); 24 (1989–2016); 25 (2016–present)
- Members: PP (13); BNG (9); PSdeG (3)

A Coruña (Spanish: La Coruña, English: Corunna) is one of the four constituencies (Spanish: circunscripciones) represented in the Parliament of Galicia, the regional legislature of the autonomous community of Galicia. The constituency currently elects 25 deputies. Its boundaries correspond to those of the Spanish province of A Coruña. The electoral system uses the D'Hondt method and closed-list proportional representation, with a minimum threshold of five percent.

== Electoral system ==
The constituency was created as per the Statute of Autonomy for Galicia of 1981 and was first contested in the 1981 regional election. The Statute provided for the four provinces in Galicia—A Coruña, Lugo, Ourense and Pontevedra—to be established as multi-member districts in the Parliament of Galicia, with this regulation being maintained under the 1985 regional electoral law. Each constituency is entitled to an initial minimum of 10 seats, with the remaining 35 being distributed in proportion to their populations. In the 1981 and 1985 elections, each constituency was allocated a fixed number of seats: 22 for A Coruña, 15 for Lugo, 15 for Ourense and 19 for Pontevedra.

Voting is on the basis of universal suffrage, which comprises all nationals over eighteen, registered in Galicia and in full enjoyment of their political rights. Amendments to the electoral law in 2011 required for Galicians abroad to apply for voting before being permitted to vote, a system known as "begged" or expat vote (Spanish: Voto rogado) which was abolished in 2022. Seats are elected using the D'Hondt method and a closed list proportional representation, with an electoral threshold of five percent of valid votes—which includes blank ballots; until a 1993 reform, the threshold was set at three percent—being applied in each constituency. The use of the D'Hondt method may result in a higher effective threshold, depending on the district magnitude.

The electoral law allows for parties and federations registered in the interior ministry, coalitions and groupings of electors to present lists of candidates. Parties and federations intending to form a coalition ahead of an election are required to inform the relevant Electoral Commission within ten days of the election call—fifteen before 1985—whereas groupings of electors need to secure the signature of at least one percent of the electorate in the constituencies for which they seek election—one-thousandth of the electorate, with a compulsory minimum of 500 signatures, until 1985—disallowing electors from signing for more than one list of candidates.

== Deputies ==
Deputies 1981–present
Key to parties BNPG/BNG PCG AGE En Marea PSG–EG PSdeG CG UCD PP CP AP
Parliament	Election	Distribution
1st	1981	1 / 1 / 6 / 5 / 9
2nd	1985	1 / 1 / 8 / 2 / 10
3rd	1989	2 / 1 / 10 / 11
4th	1993	5 / 6 / 13
5th	1997	6 / 5 / 13
6th	2001	6 / 6 / 12
7th	2005	5 / 8 / 11
8th	2009	4 / 8 / 12
9th	2012	2 / 4 / 5 / 13
10th	2016	2 / 5 / 5 / 13
11th	2020	7 / 4 / 14
12th	2024	9 / 3 / 13

== Regional elections ==
=== 2024 ===
Summary of the 18 February 2024 Parliament of Galicia election results in A Coruña
Parties and alliances	Popular vote			Seats	
Parties and alliances	Votes	%	±pp	Total	+/−
People's Party (PP)	292,651	47.65	–1.50	13	–1
Galician Nationalist Bloc (BNG)	199,462	32.48	+7.62	9	+2
Socialists' Party of Galicia (PSdeG–PSOE)	79,804	12.99	–3.77	3	–1
Vox (Vox)	15,399	2.51	+0.39	0	±0
Unite Galicia (Sumar Galicia)^{1}	14,014	2.28	n/a	0	±0
Animalist Party with the Environment (PACMA)^{2}	2,551	0.42	–0.05	0	±0
We Can Galicia (Podemos–AV)^{1}	1,999	0.33	n/a	0	±0
Blank Seats (EB)	1,170	0.19	New	0	±0
For a Fairer World (PUM+J)	694	0.11	+0.04	0	±0
Galicianist Common Space (ECG)	441	0.07	New	0	±0
Blank ballots	5,938	0.97	–0.03		
Total	614,123			25	±0
Valid votes	614,123	99.15	–0.05		
Invalid votes	5,286	0.85	+0.05		
Votes cast / turnout	619,409	56.90	+7.27		
Abstentions	469,120	43.10	–7.27		
Registered voters	1,088,529				
Sources
Footnotes: ^{1} Within the Galicia in Common–Renewal–Tides alliance in the 2020 election.; ^{2} Animalist Party with the Environment results are compared to Animalist Party Against Mistreatment of Animals totals in the 2020 election.

=== 2020 ===
Summary of the 12 July 2020 Parliament of Galicia election results in A Coruña
Parties and alliances	Popular vote			Seats	
Parties and alliances	Votes	%	±pp	Total	+/−
People's Party (PP)	263,293	49.15	+1.34	14	+1
Galician Nationalist Bloc (BNG)	133,144	24.86	+16.06	7	+5
Socialists' Party of Galicia (PSdeG–PSOE)	89,767	16.76	–0.41	4	–1
Galicia in Common–Renewal–Tides (Podemos–EU–Anova)^{1}	23,757	4.43	–14.96	0	–5
Vox (Vox)	11,359	2.12	New	0	±0
Citizens–Party of the Citizenry (Cs)	2,943	0.55	–2.79	0	±0
Animalist Party Against Mistreatment of Animals (PACMA)	2,503	0.47	–0.59	0	±0
Galicianist Tide (En Marea–CxG–PG)^{2}	1,289	0.24	–0.09	0	±0
Equo Galicia (Equo)	505	0.09	New	0	±0
Zero Cuts–Common Space–The Greens–Municipalists (RC–EsCo–OV–M)	468	0.09	–0.06	0	±0
Communist Party of the Workers of Galicia (PCTG)	364	0.07	New	0	±0
For a Fairer World (PUM+J)	353	0.07	New	0	±0
Libertarian Party (P–LIB)	312	0.06	+0.02	0	±0
Democratic Centre Coalition–Self-employed (CCD–AUTONOMO)	266	0.05	New	0	±0
Blank ballots	5,352	1.00	–0.14		
Total	535,675			25	±0
Valid votes	535,675	99.20	+0.14		
Invalid votes	4,321	0.80	–0.14		
Votes cast / turnout	539,996	49.63	–4.42		
Abstentions	548,068	50.37	+4.42		
Registered voters	1,088,064				
Sources
Footnotes: ^{1} Galicia in Common–Renewal–Tides results are compared to In Tide totals in the 2016 election.; ^{2} Galicianist Tide results are compared to Commitment to Galicia totals in the 2016 election.

=== 2016 ===
Summary of the 25 September 2016 Parliament of Galicia election results in A Coruña
Parties and alliances	Popular vote			Seats	
Parties and alliances	Votes	%	±pp	Total	+/−
People's Party (PP)	278,295	47.81	+2.42	13	±0
In Tide (En Marea)^{1}	112,893	19.39	+2.78	5	+1
Socialists' Party of Galicia (PSdeG–PSOE)	99,934	17.17	–1.61	5	±0
Galician Nationalist Bloc–We–Galician Candidacy (BNG–Nós)	51,246	8.80	–0.81	2	±0
Citizens–Party of the Citizenry (C's)	19,419	3.34	New	0	±0
Animalist Party Against Mistreatment of Animals (PACMA)	6,198	1.06	+0.45	0	±0
Commitment to Galicia (CxG)	1,898	0.33	–0.62	0	±0
Zero Cuts–Green Group (Recortes Cero–GV)	883	0.15	New	0	±0
Let's Win Galicia: Yes We Can (Gañemos)	875	0.15	New	0	±0
Anti-Corruption and Justice Party (PAyJ)	848	0.15	New	0	±0
Citizens–Centrum (C–C)	840	0.14	New	0	±0
Communists of Galicia (PCPE–CdG)	629	0.11	–0.05	0	±0
Independent Alternative of Galicia (AIG)	367	0.06	New	0	±0
United for the Future! (Unidos SI–DEF)	296	0.05	New	0	±0
Citizens of Galicia Democratic Action (ADCG)	289	0.05	New	0	±0
Libertarian Party (P–LIB)	210	0.04	New	0	±0
XXI Convergence (C21)	193	0.03	–0.03	0	±0
Galicia New Way (VN)	129	0.02	New	0	±0
Blank ballots	6,656	1.14	–1.88		
Total	582,098			25	+1
Valid votes	582,098	99.06	+1.36		
Invalid votes	5,535	0.94	–1.36		
Votes cast / turnout	587,633	54.05	–0.45		
Abstentions	499,660	45.95	+0.45		
Registered voters	1,087,293				
Sources
Footnotes: ^{1} In Tide results are compared to Galician Left Alternative totals in the 2012 election.

=== 2012 ===
Summary of the 21 October 2012 Parliament of Galicia election results in A Coruña
Parties and alliances	Popular vote			Seats	
Parties and alliances	Votes	%	±pp	Total	+/−
People's Party (PP)	263,167	45.39	–0.12	13	+1
Socialists' Party of Galicia (PSdeG–PSOE)	108,886	18.78	–11.80	5	–3
Galician Left Alternative (United Left–Anova) (AGE)^{1}	96,278	16.61	+15.51	4	+4
Galician Nationalist Bloc (BNG)	55,716	9.61	–6.12	2	–2
Union, Progress and Democracy (UPyD)	10,438	1.80	+0.11	0	±0
Blank Seats (EB)	8,709	1.50	New	0	±0
Commitment to Galicia (CxG)^{2}	5,503	0.95	–1.39	0	±0
Animalist Party Against Mistreatment of Animals (PACMA)	3,510	0.61	New	0	±0
Civil Society and Democracy (SCD)	2,824	0.49	New	0	±0
Land Party (PT)	1,651	0.28	New	0	±0
Corunnan Union (UC)	1,172	0.20	New	0	±0
Communists of Galicia (PCPE–CdG)	929	0.16	New	0	±0
Communist Unification of Spain (UCE)	815	0.14	New	0	±0
Humanist Party (PH)	740	0.13	+0.02	0	±0
Spanish Phalanx of the CNSO (FE–JONS)	610	0.11	New	0	±0
Internationalist Solidarity and Self-Management (SAIn)	489	0.08	+0.02	0	±0
Liberal Democratic Centre (CDL)	444	0.08	New	0	±0
XXI Convergence (C.XXI)	367	0.06	New	0	±0
Blank ballots	17,489	3.02	+1.08		
Total	579,737			24	±0
Valid votes	579,737	97.70	–1.48		
Invalid votes	13,621	2.30	+1.48		
Votes cast / turnout	593,358	54.50	–8.50		
Abstentions	495,438	45.50	+8.50		
Registered voters	1,088,796				
Sources
Footnotes: ^{1} Galician Left Alternative results are compared to United Left totals in the 2009 election.; ^{2} Commitment to Galicia results are compared to Terra Galega totals in the 2009 election.

=== 2009 ===
Summary of the 1 March 2009 Parliament of Galicia election results in A Coruña
Parties and alliances	Popular vote			Seats	
Parties and alliances	Votes	%	±pp	Total	+/−
People's Party (PP)	304,779	45.51	+2.57	12	+1
Socialists' Party of Galicia (PSdeG–PSOE)	204,779	30.58	–2.63	8	±0
Galician Nationalist Bloc (BNG)	105,344	15.73	–4.77	4	–1
Galician Land (TeGa)	15,653	2.34	New	0	±0
Union, Progress and Democracy (UPyD)	11,345	1.69	New	0	±0
United Left (EU–IU)	7,348	1.10	+0.10	0	±0
The Greens–Green Group (OV–GV)	3,109	0.46	New	0	±0
For a Fairer World (PUM+J)	1,165	0.17	New	0	±0
Galician People's Front (FPG)	860	0.13	±0.00	0	±0
We–People's Unity (Nós–UP)	666	0.10	±0.00	0	±0
Humanist Party (PH)	463	0.07	–0.07	0	±0
Internationalist Solidarity and Self-Management (SAIn)	420	0.06	New	0	±0
More Galicia (+G)	362	0.05	New	0	±0
Electronic Voting Assembly (AVE)	230	0.03	New	0	±0
Liberal Centrist Union (UCL)	228	0.03	New	0	±0
Blank ballots	12,997	1.94	+0.52		
Total	669,748			24	±0
Valid votes	669,748	99.18	–0.40		
Invalid votes	5,507	0.82	+0.40		
Votes cast / turnout	675,255	63.00	–0.21		
Abstentions	396,643	37.00	+0.21		
Registered voters	1,071,898				

=== 2005 ===
Summary of the 19 June 2005 Parliament of Galicia election results in A Coruña
Parties and alliances	Popular vote			Seats	
Parties and alliances	Votes	%	±pp	Total	+/−
People's Party (PP)	286,278	42.94	–5.73	11	–1
Socialists' Party of Galicia (PSdeG–PSOE)	221,436	33.21	+10.30	8	+2
Galician Nationalist Bloc (BNG)	136,696	20.50	–3.58	5	–1
United Left (EU–IU)	6,691	1.00	+0.30	0	±0
Party of Self-employed and Professionals (AUTONOMO)	1,348	0.20	–0.21	0	±0
Democratic and Social Centre (CDS)	1,074	0.16	New	0	±0
Humanist Party (PH)	920	0.14	–0.16	0	±0
Galician People's Front (FPG)	836	0.13	–0.05	0	±0
We–People's Unity (Nós–UP)	692	0.10	New	0	±0
National Democracy (DN)	550	0.08	New	0	±0
Galician Identity (IG)	376	0.06	New	0	±0
Spanish Phalanx of the CNSO (FE–JONS)	375	0.06	New	0	±0
Blank ballots	9,434	1.42	–0.44		
Total	666,706			24	±0
Valid votes	666,706	99.58	+0.28		
Invalid votes	2,836	0.42	–0.28		
Votes cast / turnout	669,542	63.21	+4.16		
Abstentions	389,690	36.79	–4.16		
Registered voters	1,059,232				

=== 2001 ===
Summary of the 21 October 2001 Parliament of Galicia election results in A Coruña
Parties and alliances	Popular vote			Seats	
Parties and alliances	Votes	%	±pp	Total	+/−
People's Party (PP)	296,734	48.67	–1.13	12	–1
Galician Nationalist Bloc (BNG)	146,816	24.08	–2.17	6	±0
Socialists' Party of Galicia (PSdeG–PSOE)	139,662	22.91	+2.80	6	+1
United Left (EU–IU)	4,278	0.70	–0.18	0	±0
Galician Progressive Democracy (DPG)	3,032	0.50	–0.25	0	±0
Party of Self-employed and Professionals (AUTONOMO)	2,492	0.41	+0.07	0	±0
Left of Galicia (EdeG)	2,447	0.40	New	0	±0
Humanist Party (PH)	1,822	0.30	+0.15	0	±0
Galician People's Front (FPG)	1,104	0.18	–0.02	0	±0
Blank ballots	11,352	1.86	+0.48		
Total	609,739			24	±0
Valid votes	609,739	99.30	–0.18		
Invalid votes	4,280	0.70	+0.18		
Votes cast / turnout	614,019	59.05	–2.06		
Abstentions	425,767	40.95	+2.06		
Registered voters	1,039,786				

=== 1997 ===
Summary of the 19 October 1997 Parliament of Galicia election results in La Coruña
Parties and alliances	Popular vote			Seats	
Parties and alliances	Votes	%	±pp	Total	+/−
People's Party (PP)	316,003	49.80	+0.82	13	±0
Galician Nationalist Bloc (BNG)	166,556	26.25	+6.64	6	+1
Socialists' Party–Galician Left–The Greens (PSdeG–PSOE/EU–EG/Os Verdes)^{1}	127,587	20.11	–8.53	5	–1
United Left (IU)	5,608	0.88	New	0	±0
Galician Democracy (DG)	4,771	0.75	New	0	±0
Party of Self-employed and Professionals (AUTONOMO)	2,136	0.34	New	0	±0
Galician People's Front (FPG)	1,300	0.20	New	0	±0
The Move (Movida)	939	0.15	New	0	±0
Humanist Party (PH)	927	0.15	–0.05	0	±0
Blank ballots	8,770	1.38	+0.35		
Total	634,597			24	±0
Valid votes	634,597	99.48	+0.04		
Invalid votes	3,300	0.52	–0.04		
Votes cast / turnout	637,897	61.11	–1.28		
Abstentions	405,896	38.89	+1.28		
Registered voters	1,043,793				
Sources
Footnotes: ^{1} Socialists' Party–Galician Left–The Greens results are compared to the combined totals of the Socialists' Party of Galicia, United Left–Galician Unity and The Greens of Galicia in the 1993 election.

=== 1993 ===
Summary of the 17 October 1993 Parliament of Galicia election results in La Coruña
Parties and alliances	Popular vote			Seats	
Parties and alliances	Votes	%	±pp	Total	+/−
People's Party (PP)	281,578	48.98	+8.06	13	+2
Socialists' Party of Galicia (PSdeG–PSOE)	141,544	24.62	–10.72	6	–4
Galician Nationalist Bloc (BNG)^{1}	112,713	19.61	+8.91	5	+3
United Left–Galician Unity (EU–UG)^{2}	21,253	3.70	–2.38	0	–1
Galician Alternative (AG)	2,478	0.43	New	0	±0
Galician Coalition (CG)	2,197	0.38	–1.22	0	±0
The Greens of Galicia (Os Verdes)	1,851	0.32	+0.02	0	±0
Ruiz-Mateos Group–European Democratic Alliance (ARM–ADE)	1,829	0.32	–0.24	0	±0
The Ecologists (LE)	1,236	0.22	±0.00	0	±0
Humanist Citizen Platform (PCH)	1,133	0.20	+0.15	0	±0
United People's Assembly (APU)	606	0.11	New	0	±0
Coalition for a New Socialist Party (NPS)	503	0.09	New	0	±0
Blank ballots	5,938	1.03	+0.60		
Total	574,859			24	±0
Valid votes	574,859	99.44	+0.55		
Invalid votes	3,256	0.56	–0.55		
Votes cast / turnout	578,115	62.39	+3.11		
Abstentions	348,474	37.61	–3.11		
Registered voters	926,589				
Sources
Footnotes: ^{1} Galician Nationalist Bloc results are compared to the combined totals of Galician Nationalist Bloc and Galician Nationalist Party–Galicianist Party totals in the 1989 election.; ^{2} United Left–Galician Unity results are compared to the combined totals of Galician Socialist Party–Galician Left and United Left totals in the 1989 election.

=== 1989 ===
Summary of the 17 December 1989 Parliament of Galicia election results in La Coruña
Parties and alliances	Popular vote			Seats	
Parties and alliances	Votes	%	±pp	Total	+/−
People's Party (PP)^{1}	211,847	40.92	+2.97	11	+1
Socialists' Party of Galicia (PSdeG–PSOE)	182,970	35.34	+3.00	10	+2
Galician Nationalist Bloc (BNG)	48,257	9.32	+4.14	2	+1
Galician Socialist Party–Galician Left (PSG–EG)	21,438	4.14	–1.54	1	±0
Democratic and Social Centre (CDS)	15,586	3.01	–0.38	0	±0
United Left (EU)^{2}	10,033	1.94	+0.93	0	±0
Galician Coalition (CG)	8,262	1.60	–8.33	0	–2
Galician Nationalist Party–Galicianist Party (PNG–PG)	7,144	1.38	New	0	±0
Ruiz-Mateos Group (ARM)	2,898	0.56	New	0	±0
Workers' Socialist Party (PST)	1,697	0.33	–0.67	0	±0
The Greens of Galicia (OVG)	1,551	0.30	New	0	±0
The Ecologist Greens (OVE)	1,148	0.22	New	0	±0
Galician People's Front (FPG)	824	0.16	New	0	±0
United Galicia Party (PGU)	576	0.11	New	0	±0
Communist Party of the Galician People (PCPG)	497	0.10	New	0	±0
Spanish Phalanx of the CNSO (FE–JONS)	296	0.06	–0.18	0	±0
Humanist Platform (PH)	263	0.05	–0.58	0	±0
Communist Party of Spain (Marxist–Leninist) (PCE (m–l))	225	0.04	–0.12	0	±0
Blank ballots	2,214	0.43	–0.32		
Total	517,726			24	+2
Valid votes	517,726	98.89	+0.47		
Invalid votes	5,801	1.11	–0.47		
Votes cast / turnout	523,527	59.28	+0.19		
Abstentions	359,650	40.72	–0.19		
Registered voters	883,177				
Sources
Footnotes: ^{1} People's Party results are compared to People's Coalition totals in the 1985 election.; ^{2} United Left results are compared to Communist Party of Galicia totals in the 1985 election.

=== 1985 ===
Summary of the 24 November 1985 Parliament of Galicia election results in La Coruña
Parties and alliances	Popular vote			Seats	
Parties and alliances	Votes	%	±pp	Total	+/−
People's Coalition (AP–PDP–PL)^{1}	190,356	37.95	+5.29	10	+1
Socialists' Party of Galicia (PSdG–PSOE)	162,247	32.34	+8.38	8	+2
Galician Coalition (CG)	49,800	9.93	New	2	+2
Galician Socialist Party–Galician Left (PSG–EG)^{2}	28,473	5.68	+2.34	1	+1
Galician Nationalist Bloc (BNG)^{3}	25,970	5.18	–1.52	1	±0
Democratic and Social Centre (CDS)	16,981	3.39	New	0	±0
Communist Party of Galicia (PCE–PCG)	5,072	1.01	–2.42	0	–1
Workers' Socialist Party (PST)	5,031	1.00	–1.54	0	±0
Communist Party of Galicia (Revolutionary Marxist) (PCG (m–r))	4,185	0.83	New	0	±0
Humanist Platform (PH)	3,145	0.63	New	0	±0
Galician Party of the Country (PGC)	2,528	0.50	New	0	±0
Galician Socialist Unity (USG)	1,379	0.27	–1.26	0	±0
Spanish Phalanx of the CNSO (FE–JONS)	1,185	0.24	±0.00	0	±0
Communist Party of Spain (Marxist–Leninist) (PCE (m–l))	799	0.16	–0.15	0	±0
Communist Movement of Galicia (MCG)	710	0.14	–0.47	0	±0
Union of the Democratic Centre (UCD)	n/a	n/a	–19.50	0	–5
Blank ballots	3,776	0.75	+0.75		
Total	501,637			22	±0
Valid votes	501,637	98.42	+0.27		
Invalid votes	8,051	1.58	–0.27		
Votes cast / turnout	509,688	59.09	+11.70		
Abstentions	352,876	40.91	–11.70		
Registered voters	862,564				
Sources
Footnotes: ^{1} People's Coalition results are compared to People's Alliance totals in the 1981 election.; ^{2} Galician Socialist Party–Galician Left results are compared to Galician Left totals in the 1981 election.; ^{3} Galician Nationalist Bloc results are compared to Galician National-Popular Bloc–Galician Socialist Party totals in the 1981 election.

=== 1981 ===
Summary of the 20 October 1981 Parliament of Galicia election results in La Coruña
Parties and alliances	Popular vote			Seats	
Parties and alliances	Votes	%	±pp	Total	+/−
People's Alliance (AP)	128,287	32.66	n/a	9	n/a
Socialists' Party of Galicia (PSdG–PSOE)	94,127	23.96	n/a	6	n/a
Union of the Democratic Centre (UCD)	76,591	19.50	n/a	5	n/a
Galician National-Popular Bloc–Galician Socialist Party (BNPG–PSG)	26,303	6.70	n/a	1	n/a
Communist Party of Galicia (PCG–PCE)	13,488	3.43	n/a	1	n/a
Galician Left (EG)	13,124	3.34	n/a	0	n/a
Galicianist Party (PG)	11,219	2.86	n/a	0	n/a
Workers' Socialist Party (PST)	9,969	2.54	n/a	0	n/a
Galician Socialist Unity–PSOE (USG–PSOE)	6,001	1.53	n/a	0	n/a
La Coruña Capital Defense Independents (IDC)	5,486	1.40	n/a	0	n/a
New Force (FN)	2,244	0.57	n/a	0	n/a
Revolutionary Communist League–Communist Movement (LCR–MCG)	2,242	0.57	n/a	0	n/a
Spanish Ruralist Party (PRE)	1,530	0.39	n/a	0	n/a
Communist Party of Spain (Marxist–Leninist) (PCE (m–l))	1,216	0.31	n/a	0	n/a
Spanish Phalanx of the CNSO (FE–JONS)	945	0.24	n/a	0	n/a
Blank ballots	0	0.00	n/a		
Total	392,772			22	n/a
Valid votes	392,772	98.15	n/a		
Invalid votes	7,415	1.85	n/a		
Votes cast / turnout	400,187	47.39	n/a		
Abstentions	444,319	52.61	n/a		
Registered voters	844,506				
