= Ourense (Parliament of Galicia constituency) =

Coordinates: 42°10′N 7°30′W

- Parliament of Galicia; Electoral constituency
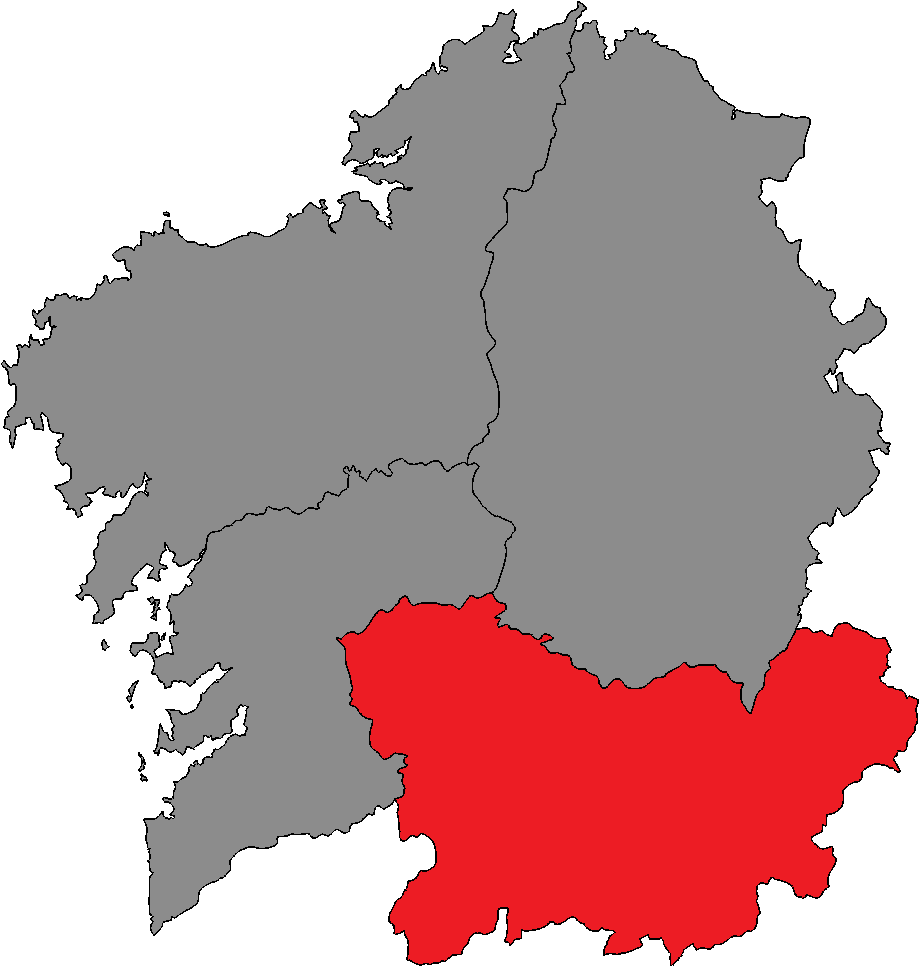
- Location of Ourense within Galicia
- Province: Ourense
- Autonomous community: Galicia
- Population: ▲304,592 (2024)
- Electorate: ▼355,833 (2024)
- Major settlements: Ourense

Current constituency
- Created: 1981
- Seats: 15 (1981–1997); 14 (1997–present)
- Members: PP (8); BNG (4); PSdeG (1); DO (1)

Ourense (Spanish: Orense) is one of the four constituencies (Spanish: circunscripciones) represented in the Parliament of Galicia, the regional legislature of the autonomous community of Galicia. The constituency currently elects 14 deputies. Its boundaries correspond to those of the Spanish province of Ourense. The electoral system uses the D'Hondt method and closed-list proportional representation, with a minimum threshold of five percent.

== Electoral system ==
The constituency was created as per the Statute of Autonomy for Galicia of 1981 and was first contested in the 1981 regional election. The Statute provided for the four provinces in Galicia—A Coruña, Lugo, Ourense and Pontevedra—to be established as multi-member districts in the Parliament of Galicia, with this regulation being maintained under the 1985 regional electoral law. Each constituency is entitled to an initial minimum of 10 seats, with the remaining 35 being distributed in proportion to their populations. In the 1981 and 1985 elections, each constituency was allocated a fixed number of seats: 22 for A Coruña, 15 for Lugo, 15 for Ourense and 19 for Pontevedra.

Voting is on the basis of universal suffrage, which comprises all nationals over eighteen, registered in Galicia and in full enjoyment of their political rights. Amendments to the electoral law in 2011 required for Galicians abroad to apply for voting before being permitted to vote, a system known as "begged" or expat vote (Spanish: Voto rogado) which was abolished in 2022. Seats are elected using the D'Hondt method and a closed list proportional representation, with an electoral threshold of five percent of valid votes—which includes blank ballots; until a 1993 reform, the threshold was set at three percent—being applied in each constituency. The use of the D'Hondt method may result in a higher effective threshold, depending on the district magnitude.

The electoral law allows for parties and federations registered in the interior ministry, coalitions and groupings of electors to present lists of candidates. Parties and federations intending to form a coalition ahead of an election are required to inform the relevant Electoral Commission within ten days of the election call—fifteen before 1985—whereas groupings of electors need to secure the signature of at least one percent of the electorate in the constituencies for which they seek election—one-thousandth of the electorate, with a compulsory minimum of 500 signatures, until 1985—disallowing electors from signing for more than one list of candidates.

== Deputies ==
Deputies 1981–present
Key to parties BNG AGE En Marea PSdeG CG DO UCD PP CP AP
| Parliament | Election | Distribution |
| 1st | 1981 | 3 / 7 / 5 |
| 2nd | 1985 | 4 / 4 / 7 |
| 3rd | 1989 | 6 / 1 / 8 |
| 4th | 1993 | 2 / 4 / 9 |
| 5th | 1997 | 3 / 3 / 8 |
| 6th | 2001 | 3 / 3 / 8 |
| 7th | 2005 | 2 / 4 / 8 |
| 8th | 2009 | 2 / 5 / 7 |
| 9th | 2012 | 1 / 1 / 4 / 8 |
| 10th | 2016 | 1 / 2 / 2 / 9 |
| 11th | 2020 | 3 / 3 / 8 |
| 12th | 2024 | 4 / 1 / 1 / 8 |

== Regional elections ==
=== 2024 ===
Summary of the 18 February 2024 Parliament of Galicia election results in Ourense
| Parties and alliances | Popular vote | | | Seats | |
| Parties and alliances | Votes | % | ±pp | Total | +/− |
|---|---|---|---|---|---|
| People's Party (PP) | 88,694 | 50.07 | –3.03 | 8 | ±0 |
| Galician Nationalist Bloc (BNG) | 44,222 | 24.97 | +5.07 | 4 | +1 |
| Socialists' Party of Galicia (PSdeG–PSOE) | 22,042 | 12.44 | –7.25 | 1 | –2 |
| Ourensan Democracy (DO) | 15,442 | 8.72 | New | 1 | +1 |
| Vox (Vox) | 2,961 | 1.67 | –0.37 | 0 | ±0 |
| Unite Galicia (Sumar Galicia)^{1} | 979 | 0.55 | n/a | 0 | ±0 |
| Galicianist Common Space (ECG) | 560 | 0.32 | New | 0 | ±0 |
| Animalist Party with the Environment (PACMA)^{2} | 478 | 0.27 | –0.09 | 0 | ±0 |
| We Can Galicia (Podemos–AV)^{1} | 309 | 0.17 | n/a | 0 | ±0 |
| Blank Seats (EB) | 175 | 0.10 | +0.04 | 0 | ±0 |
| For a Fairer World (PUM+J) | 160 | 0.09 | +0.01 | 0 | ±0 |
| Blank ballots | 1,105 | 0.62 | –0.18 | | |
| Total | 177,127 | | | 14 | ±0 |
| Valid votes | 177,127 | 99.31 | +0.22 | | |
| Invalid votes | 1,226 | 0.69 | –0.22 | | |
| Votes cast / turnout | 178,353 | 50.12 | +6.20 | | |
| Abstentions | 177,480 | 49.88 | –6.20 | | |
| Registered voters | 355,833 | | | | |
Sources
Footnotes: ^{1} Within the Galicia in Common–Renewal–Tides alliance in the 2020 election.; ^{2} Animalist Party with the Environment results are compared to Animalist Party Against Mistreatment of Animals totals in the 2020 election.

=== 2020 ===
Summary of the 12 July 2020 Parliament of Galicia election results in Ourense
| Parties and alliances | Popular vote | | | Seats | |
| Parties and alliances | Votes | % | ±pp | Total | +/− |
|---|---|---|---|---|---|
| People's Party (PP) | 83,016 | 53.10 | –0.03 | 8 | –1 |
| Galician Nationalist Bloc (BNG) | 31,117 | 19.90 | +13.90 | 3 | +2 |
| Socialists' Party of Galicia (PSdeG–PSOE) | 30,784 | 19.69 | +2.07 | 3 | +1 |
| Galicia in Common–Renewal–Tides (Podemos–EU–Anova)^{1} | 3,386 | 2.17 | –11.60 | 0 | –2 |
| Vox (Vox) | 3,190 | 2.04 | New | 0 | ±0 |
| Citizens–Party of the Citizenry (Cs) | 1,557 | 1.00 | –1.76 | 0 | ±0 |
| Common Space–Zero Cuts–The Greens–Municipalists (EsCo–RC–OV–M)^{3} | 846 | 0.54 | +0.43 | 0 | ±0 |
| Animalist Party Against Mistreatment of Animals (PACMA) | 566 | 0.36 | –0.42 | 0 | ±0 |
| Galicianist Tide (En Marea–CxG–PG)^{2} | 188 | 0.12 | –0.18 | 0 | ±0 |
| For a Fairer World (PUM+J) | 123 | 0.08 | New | 0 | ±0 |
| With You, We Are Democracy (Contigo) | 117 | 0.07 | New | 0 | ±0 |
| Communist Party of the Workers of Galicia (PCTG) | 99 | 0.06 | New | 0 | ±0 |
| Blank Seats (EB) | 99 | 0.06 | New | 0 | ±0 |
| Blank ballots | 1,255 | 0.80 | +0.04 | | |
| Total | 156,343 | | | 14 | ±0 |
| Valid votes | 156,343 | 99.09 | –0.05 | | |
| Invalid votes | 1,437 | 0.91 | +0.05 | | |
| Votes cast / turnout | 157,780 | 43.92 | –4.78 | | |
| Abstentions | 201,476 | 56.08 | +4.78 | | |
| Registered voters | 359,256 | | | | |
Sources
Footnotes: ^{1} Galicia in Common–Renewal–Tides results are compared to In Tide totals in the 2016 election.; ^{2} Galicianist Tide results are compared to Commitment to Galicia totals in the 2016 election.; ^{3} Common Space–Zero Cuts–The Greens results are compared to Zero Cuts–Green Group totals in the 2016 election.

=== 2016 ===
Summary of the 25 September 2016 Parliament of Galicia election results in Ourense
| Parties and alliances | Popular vote | | | Seats | |
| Parties and alliances | Votes | % | ±pp | Total | +/− |
|---|---|---|---|---|---|
| People's Party (PP) | 93,487 | 53.13 | +3.96 | 9 | +1 |
| Socialists' Party of Galicia (PSdeG–PSOE) | 31,006 | 17.62 | –6.05 | 2 | –2 |
| In Tide (En Marea)^{1} | 24,222 | 13.77 | +5.99 | 2 | +1 |
| Galician Nationalist Bloc–We–Galician Candidacy (BNG–Nós) | 10,558 | 6.00 | –2.46 | 1 | ±0 |
| Ourensan Democracy (DO) | 7,723 | 4.39 | +2.07 | 0 | ±0 |
| Citizens–Party of the Citizenry (C's) | 4,864 | 2.76 | New | 0 | ±0 |
| Animalist Party Against Mistreatment of Animals (PACMA) | 1,375 | 0.78 | +0.39 | 0 | ±0 |
| Commitment to Galicia (CxG) | 529 | 0.30 | –1.49 | 0 | ±0 |
| Anti-Corruption and Justice Party (PAyJ) | 202 | 0.11 | New | 0 | ±0 |
| Zero Cuts–Green Group (Recortes Cero–GV) | 190 | 0.11 | New | 0 | ±0 |
| Let's Win Galicia: Yes We Can (Gañemos) | 187 | 0.11 | New | 0 | ±0 |
| Galicia New Way (VN) | 152 | 0.09 | New | 0 | ±0 |
| Communists of Galicia (PCPE–CdG) | 114 | 0.06 | New | 0 | ±0 |
| Blank ballots | 1,335 | 0.76 | –1.44 | | |
| Total | 175,944 | | | 14 | ±0 |
| Valid votes | 175,944 | 99.14 | +1.46 | | |
| Invalid votes | 1,524 | 0.86 | –1.46 | | |
| Votes cast / turnout | 177,468 | 48.70 | –2.80 | | |
| Abstentions | 186,930 | 51.30 | +2.80 | | |
| Registered voters | 364,398 | | | | |
Sources
Footnotes: ^{1} In Tide results are compared to Galician Left Alternative totals in the 2012 election.

=== 2012 ===
Summary of the 21 October 2012 Parliament of Galicia election results in Ourense
| Parties and alliances | Popular vote | | | Seats | |
| Parties and alliances | Votes | % | ±pp | Total | +/− |
|---|---|---|---|---|---|
| People's Party (PP) | 90,026 | 49.17 | +0.64 | 8 | +1 |
| Socialists' Party of Galicia (PSdeG–PSOE) | 43,340 | 23.67 | –8.20 | 4 | –1 |
| Galician Nationalist Bloc (BNG) | 15,492 | 8.46 | –7.50 | 1 | –1 |
| Galician Left Alternative (United Left–Anova) (AGE)^{1} | 14,245 | 7.78 | +7.25 | 1 | +1 |
| Ourensan Democracy (DO) | 4,245 | 2.32 | +1.85 | 0 | ±0 |
| Commitment to Galicia (CxG)^{2} | 3,270 | 1.79 | +1.54 | 0 | ±0 |
| Civil Society and Democracy (SCD) | 2,938 | 1.60 | New | 0 | ±0 |
| Blank Seats (EB) | 2,079 | 1.14 | New | 0 | ±0 |
| Union, Progress and Democracy (UPyD) | 1,151 | 0.63 | –0.05 | 0 | ±0 |
| Animalist Party Against Mistreatment of Animals (PACMA) | 720 | 0.39 | New | 0 | ±0 |
| For a Fairer World (PUM+J) | 386 | 0.21 | –0.07 | 0 | ±0 |
| Pirates of Galicia (Pirata.gal) | 336 | 0.18 | New | 0 | ±0 |
| Land Party (PT) | 260 | 0.14 | New | 0 | ±0 |
| Liberal Democratic Centre (CDL) | 187 | 0.10 | New | 0 | ±0 |
| Spanish Phalanx of the CNSO (FE–JONS) | 123 | 0.07 | +0.02 | 0 | ±0 |
| XXI Convergence (C.XXI) | 115 | 0.06 | New | 0 | ±0 |
| Communist Unification of Spain (UCE) | 98 | 0.05 | New | 0 | ±0 |
| Community Integration Party (PYC) | 53 | 0.03 | New | 0 | ±0 |
| Blank ballots | 4,033 | 2.20 | +1.13 | | |
| Total | 183,097 | | | 14 | ±0 |
| Valid votes | 183,097 | 97.68 | –1.57 | | |
| Invalid votes | 4,340 | 2.32 | +1.57 | | |
| Votes cast / turnout | 187,437 | 51.50 | –12.63 | | |
| Abstentions | 176,553 | 48.50 | +12.63 | | |
| Registered voters | 363,990 | | | | |
Sources
Footnotes: ^{1} Galician Left Alternative results are compared to United Left totals in the 2009 election.; ^{2} Commitment to Galicia results are compared to Terra Galega totals in the 2009 election.

=== 2009 ===
Summary of the 1 March 2009 Parliament of Galicia election results in Ourense
| Parties and alliances | Popular vote | | | Seats | |
| Parties and alliances | Votes | % | ±pp | Total | +/− |
|---|---|---|---|---|---|
| People's Party (PP) | 109,852 | 48.53 | –2.29 | 7 | –1 |
| Socialists' Party of Galicia (PSdeG–PSOE) | 72,144 | 31.87 | +1.01 | 5 | +1 |
| Galician Nationalist Bloc (BNG) | 36,126 | 15.96 | –0.36 | 2 | ±0 |
| Union, Progress and Democracy (UPyD) | 1,539 | 0.68 | New | 0 | ±0 |
| United Left (EU–IU) | 1,202 | 0.53 | +0.19 | 0 | ±0 |
| Ourensan Democracy (DO) | 1,066 | 0.47 | +0.20 | 0 | ±0 |
| For a Fairer World (PUM+J) | 625 | 0.28 | New | 0 | ±0 |
| Galician Land (TeGa) | 575 | 0.25 | New | 0 | ±0 |
| Galician People's Front (FPG) | 242 | 0.11 | +0.01 | 0 | ±0 |
| Humanist Party (PH) | 136 | 0.06 | –0.04 | 0 | ±0 |
| United Galicia (GU) | 122 | 0.05 | New | 0 | ±0 |
| Spanish Phalanx of the CNSO (FE–JONS) | 121 | 0.05 | ±0.00 | 0 | ±0 |
| We–People's Unity (Nós–UP) | 113 | 0.05 | –0.03 | 0 | ±0 |
| Liberal Centrist Union (UCL) | 83 | 0.04 | New | 0 | ±0 |
| Blank ballots | 2,429 | 1.07 | +0.22 | | |
| Total | 226,375 | | | 14 | ±0 |
| Valid votes | 226,375 | 99.25 | –0.31 | | |
| Invalid votes | 1,704 | 0.75 | +0.31 | | |
| Votes cast / turnout | 228,079 | 64.13 | –0.32 | | |
| Abstentions | 127,587 | 35.87 | +0.32 | | |
| Registered voters | 355,666 | | | | |

=== 2005 ===
Summary of the 19 June 2005 Parliament of Galicia election results in Ourense
| Parties and alliances | Popular vote | | | Seats | |
| Parties and alliances | Votes | % | ±pp | Total | +/− |
|---|---|---|---|---|---|
| People's Party (PP) | 115,684 | 50.82 | –6.55 | 8 | ±0 |
| Socialists' Party of Galicia (PSdeG–PSOE) | 70,251 | 30.86 | +11.58 | 4 | +1 |
| Galician Nationalist Bloc (BNG) | 37,141 | 16.32 | –3.95 | 2 | –1 |
| United Left (EU–IU) | 766 | 0.34 | –0.09 | 0 | ±0 |
| Ourensan Democracy (DO) | 623 | 0.27 | New | 0 | ±0 |
| Party of Self-employed and Professionals (AUTONOMO) | 241 | 0.11 | –0.07 | 0 | ±0 |
| Humanist Party (PH) | 239 | 0.10 | –0.10 | 0 | ±0 |
| Galician People's Front (FPG) | 238 | 0.10 | –0.09 | 0 | ±0 |
| Democratic and Social Centre (CDS) | 214 | 0.09 | New | 0 | ±0 |
| We–People's Unity (Nós–UP) | 186 | 0.08 | New | 0 | ±0 |
| Spanish Phalanx of the CNSO (FE–JONS) | 112 | 0.05 | New | 0 | ±0 |
| Blank ballots | 1,944 | 0.85 | –0.31 | | |
| Total | 227,639 | | | 14 | ±0 |
| Valid votes | 227,639 | 99.56 | +0.16 | | |
| Invalid votes | 1,008 | 0.44 | –0.16 | | |
| Votes cast / turnout | 228,647 | 64.45 | +3.91 | | |
| Abstentions | 126,133 | 35.55 | –3.91 | | |
| Registered voters | 354,780 | | | | |

=== 2001 ===
Summary of the 21 October 2001 Parliament of Galicia election results in Ourense
| Parties and alliances | Popular vote | | | Seats | |
| Parties and alliances | Votes | % | ±pp | Total | +/− |
|---|---|---|---|---|---|
| People's Party (PP) | 121,073 | 57.37 | +0.71 | 8 | ±0 |
| Galician Nationalist Bloc (BNG) | 42,780 | 20.27 | –1.03 | 3 | ±0 |
| Socialists' Party of Galicia (PSdeG–PSOE) | 40,695 | 19.28 | –0.30 | 3 | ±0 |
| Galician Progressive Democracy (DPG) | 1,561 | 0.74 | +0.13 | 0 | ±0 |
| United Left (EU–IU) | 910 | 0.43 | –0.14 | 0 | ±0 |
| Humanist Party (PH) | 426 | 0.20 | +0.06 | 0 | ±0 |
| Galician People's Front (FPG) | 392 | 0.19 | ±0.00 | 0 | ±0 |
| Party of Self-employed and Professionals (AUTONOMO) | 388 | 0.18 | New | 0 | ±0 |
| Left of Galicia (EdeG) | 359 | 0.17 | New | 0 | ±0 |
| Blank ballots | 2,440 | 1.16 | +0.21 | | |
| Total | 211,024 | | | 14 | ±0 |
| Valid votes | 211,024 | 99.40 | –0.11 | | |
| Invalid votes | 1,268 | 0.60 | +0.11 | | |
| Votes cast / turnout | 212,292 | 60.54 | –3.13 | | |
| Abstentions | 138,351 | 39.46 | +3.13 | | |
| Registered voters | 350,643 | | | | |

=== 1997 ===
Summary of the 19 October 1997 Parliament of Galicia election results in Orense
| Parties and alliances | Popular vote | | | Seats | |
| Parties and alliances | Votes | % | ±pp | Total | +/− |
|---|---|---|---|---|---|
| People's Party (PP) | 123,697 | 56.66 | +2.20 | 8 | –1 |
| Galician Nationalist Bloc (BNG) | 46,502 | 21.30 | +4.34 | 3 | +1 |
| Socialists' Party–Galician Left–The Greens (PSdeG–PSOE/EU–EG/Os Verdes)^{1} | 42,757 | 19.58 | –7.07 | 3 | –1 |
| Galician Democracy (DG) | 1,325 | 0.61 | New | 0 | ±0 |
| United Left (IU) | 1,251 | 0.57 | New | 0 | ±0 |
| Galician People's Front (FPG) | 418 | 0.19 | New | 0 | ±0 |
| Humanist Party (PH) | 301 | 0.14 | –0.01 | 0 | ±0 |
| Blank ballots | 2,078 | 0.95 | +0.33 | | |
| Total | 218,329 | | | 14 | –1 |
| Valid votes | 218,329 | 99.51 | –0.08 | | |
| Invalid votes | 1,077 | 0.49 | +0.08 | | |
| Votes cast / turnout | 219,406 | 63.67 | +0.02 | | |
| Abstentions | 125,198 | 36.33 | –0.02 | | |
| Registered voters | 344,604 | | | | |
Sources
Footnotes: ^{1} Socialists' Party–Galician Left–The Greens results are compared to the combined totals of the Socialists' Party of Galicia, United Left–Galician Unity and The Greens of Galicia in the 1993 election.

=== 1993 ===
Summary of the 17 October 1993 Parliament of Galicia election results in Orense
| Parties and alliances | Popular vote | | | Seats | |
| Parties and alliances | Votes | % | ±pp | Total | +/− |
|---|---|---|---|---|---|
| People's Party (PP) | 108,932 | 54.46 | +10.04 | 9 | +1 |
| Socialists' Party of Galicia (PSdeG–PSOE) | 50,865 | 25.43 | –7.37 | 4 | –2 |
| Galician Nationalist Bloc (BNG)^{1} | 33,914 | 16.96 | +8.50 | 2 | +2 |
| United Left–Galician Unity (EU–UG)^{2} | 1,990 | 0.99 | –1.94 | 0 | ±0 |
| Galician Coalition (CG) | 1,006 | 0.50 | –5.89 | 0 | –1 |
| Ruiz-Mateos Group–European Democratic Alliance (ARM–ADE) | 784 | 0.39 | –0.45 | 0 | ±0 |
| The Greens of Galicia (Os Verdes) | 454 | 0.23 | New | 0 | ±0 |
| Humanist Citizen Platform (PCH) | 302 | 0.15 | +0.10 | 0 | ±0 |
| The Ecologists (LE) | 231 | 0.12 | –0.06 | 0 | ±0 |
| United People's Assembly (APU) | 180 | 0.09 | New | 0 | ±0 |
| Galician Alternative (AG) | 111 | 0.06 | New | 0 | ±0 |
| Blank ballots | 1,250 | 0.62 | +0.32 | | |
| Total | 200,019 | | | 15 | ±0 |
| Valid votes | 200,019 | 99.59 | +0.30 | | |
| Invalid votes | 820 | 0.41 | –0.30 | | |
| Votes cast / turnout | 200,839 | 63.65 | +9.43 | | |
| Abstentions | 114,709 | 36.35 | –9.43 | | |
| Registered voters | 315,548 | | | | |
Sources
Footnotes: ^{1} Galician Nationalist Bloc results are compared to the combined totals of Galician Nationalist Bloc and Galician Nationalist Party–Galicianist Party totals in the 1989 election.; ^{2} United Left–Galician Unity results are compared to the combined totals of Galician Socialist Party–Galician Left and United Left totals in the 1989 election.

=== 1989 ===
Summary of the 17 December 1989 Parliament of Galicia election results in Orense
| Parties and alliances | Popular vote | | | Seats | |
| Parties and alliances | Votes | % | ±pp | Total | +/− |
|---|---|---|---|---|---|
| People's Party (PP)^{1} | 81,563 | 44.06 | +3.93 | 8 | +1 |
| Socialists' Party of Galicia (PSdeG–PSOE) | 60,712 | 32.80 | +7.15 | 6 | +2 |
| Galician Coalition (CG) | 11,827 | 6.39 | –16.42 | 1 | –3 |
| Galician Nationalist Bloc (BNG) | 10,086 | 5.45 | +2.42 | 0 | ±0 |
| Democratic and Social Centre (CDS) | 6,349 | 3.43 | +0.54 | 0 | ±0 |
| Galician Nationalist Party–Galicianist Party (PNG–PG) | 5,564 | 3.01 | New | 0 | ±0 |
| Galician Socialist Party–Galician Left (PSG–EG) | 3,881 | 2.10 | –0.86 | 0 | ±0 |
| Ruiz-Mateos Group (ARM) | 1,555 | 0.84 | New | 0 | ±0 |
| United Left (EU)^{2} | 1,533 | 0.83 | +0.33 | 0 | ±0 |
| Galician People's Front (FPG) | 435 | 0.23 | New | 0 | ±0 |
| Workers' Socialist Party (PST) | 357 | 0.19 | –0.39 | 0 | ±0 |
| The Ecologist Greens (OVE) | 340 | 0.18 | New | 0 | ±0 |
| Alliance for the Republic (AxR) | 126 | 0.07 | New | 0 | ±0 |
| Humanist Platform (PH) | 91 | 0.05 | –0.29 | 0 | ±0 |
| Communist Party of Spain (Marxist–Leninist) (PCE (m–l)) | 73 | 0.04 | New | 0 | ±0 |
| Spanish Phalanx of the CNSO (FE–JONS) | 72 | 0.04 | –0.16 | 0 | ±0 |
| Blank ballots | 547 | 0.30 | –0.24 | | |
| Total | 185,111 | | | 15 | ±0 |
| Valid votes | 185,111 | 99.29 | +0.34 | | |
| Invalid votes | 1,321 | 0.71 | –0.34 | | |
| Votes cast / turnout | 186,432 | 54.22 | +3.98 | | |
| Abstentions | 157,382 | 45.78 | –3.98 | | |
| Registered voters | 343,814 | | | | |
Sources
Footnotes: ^{1} People's Party results are compared to People's Coalition totals in the 1985 election.; ^{2} United Left results are compared to Communist Party of Galicia totals in the 1985 election.

=== 1985 ===
Summary of the 24 November 1985 Parliament of Galicia election results in Orense
| Parties and alliances | Popular vote | | | Seats | |
| Parties and alliances | Votes | % | ±pp | Total | +/− |
|---|---|---|---|---|---|
| People's Coalition (AP–PDP–PL–CdG)^{1} | 68,945 | 40.13 | +12.12 | 7 | +2 |
| Socialists' Party of Galicia (PSdG–PSOE) | 44,075 | 25.65 | +9.26 | 4 | +1 |
| Galician Coalition (CG) | 39,186 | 22.81 | New | 4 | +4 |
| Galician Nationalist Bloc (BNG)^{2} | 5,210 | 3.03 | –2.13 | 0 | ±0 |
| Galician Socialist Party–Galician Left (PSG–EG)^{3} | 5,080 | 2.96 | +2.44 | 0 | ±0 |
| Democratic and Social Centre (CDS) | 4,973 | 2.89 | New | 0 | ±0 |
| Workers' Socialist Party (PST) | 995 | 0.58 | –0.50 | 0 | ±0 |
| Communist Party of Galicia (PCE–PCG) | 861 | 0.50 | –1.51 | 0 | ±0 |
| Humanist Platform (PH) | 592 | 0.34 | New | 0 | ±0 |
| Communist Party of Galicia (Revolutionary Marxist) (PCG (m–r)) | 471 | 0.27 | New | 0 | ±0 |
| Spanish Phalanx of the CNSO (FE–JONS) | 344 | 0.20 | New | 0 | ±0 |
| Communist Movement of Galicia (MCG) | 161 | 0.09 | –0.26 | 0 | ±0 |
| Union of the Democratic Centre (UCD) | n/a | n/a | –42.71 | 0 | –7 |
| Blank ballots | 924 | 0.54 | +0.54 | | |
| Total | 171,817 | | | 15 | ±0 |
| Valid votes | 171,817 | 98.95 | +1.93 | | |
| Invalid votes | 1,831 | 1.05 | –1.93 | | |
| Votes cast / turnout | 173,648 | 50.24 | +8.76 | | |
| Abstentions | 172,002 | 49.76 | –8.76 | | |
| Registered voters | 345,650 | | | | |
Sources
Footnotes: ^{1} People's Coalition results are compared to People's Alliance totals in the 1981 election.; ^{2} Galician Nationalist Bloc results are compared to Galician National-Popular Bloc–Galician Socialist Party totals in the 1981 election.; ^{3} Galician Socialist Party–Galician Left results are compared to Galician Left totals in the 1981 election.

=== 1981 ===
Summary of the 20 October 1981 Parliament of Galicia election results in Orense
| Parties and alliances | Popular vote | | | Seats | |
| Parties and alliances | Votes | % | ±pp | Total | +/− |
|---|---|---|---|---|---|
| Union of the Democratic Centre (UCD) | 61,103 | 42.71 | n/a | 7 | n/a |
| People's Alliance (AP) | 40,077 | 28.01 | n/a | 5 | n/a |
| Socialists' Party of Galicia (PSdG–PSOE) | 23,448 | 16.39 | n/a | 3 | n/a |
| Galician National-Popular Bloc–Galician Socialist Party (BNPG–PSG) | 7,377 | 5.16 | n/a | 0 | n/a |
| Galicianist Party (PG) | 3,314 | 2.32 | n/a | 0 | n/a |
| Communist Party of Galicia (PCG–PCE) | 2,871 | 2.01 | n/a | 0 | n/a |
| Galician Socialist Unity–PSOE (USG–PSOE) | 1,651 | 1.15 | n/a | 0 | n/a |
| Workers' Socialist Party (PST) | 1,542 | 1.08 | n/a | 0 | n/a |
| Galician Left (EG) | 748 | 0.52 | n/a | 0 | n/a |
| Revolutionary Communist League–Communist Movement (LCR–MCG) | 505 | 0.35 | n/a | 0 | n/a |
| Spanish Ruralist Party (PRE) | 433 | 0.30 | n/a | 0 | n/a |
| Blank ballots | 0 | 0.00 | n/a | | |
| Total | 143,069 | | | 15 | n/a |
| Valid votes | 143,069 | 97.02 | n/a | | |
| Invalid votes | 4,397 | 2.98 | n/a | | |
| Votes cast / turnout | 147,466 | 41.48 | n/a | | |
| Abstentions | 208,042 | 58.52 | n/a | | |
| Registered voters | 355,508 | | | | |
