= Lugo (Parliament of Galicia constituency) =

Coordinates: 43°00′N 7°30′W

- Parliament of Galicia; Electoral constituency
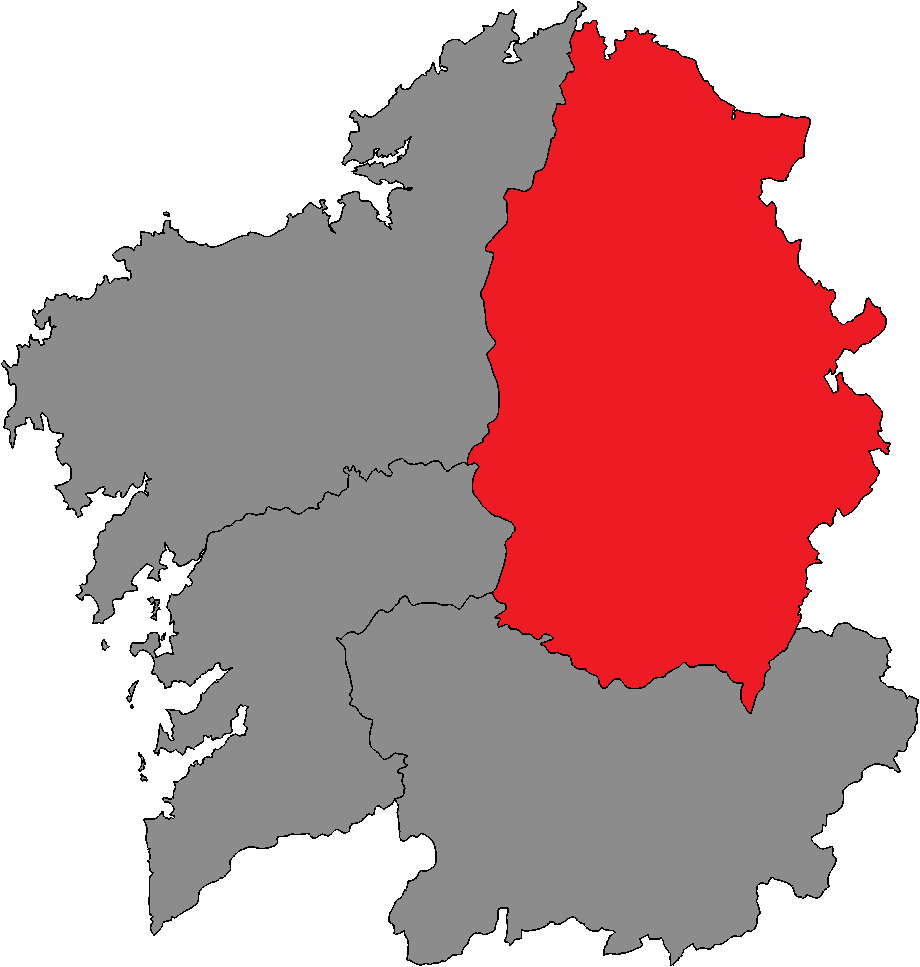
- Location of Lugo within Galicia
- Province: Lugo
- Autonomous community: Galicia
- Population: ▲324,842 (2024)
- Electorate: ▼337,745 (2024)
- Major settlements: Lugo

Current constituency
- Created: 1981
- Seats: 15 (1981–2016); 14 (2016–present)
- Members: PP (8); BNG (4); PSdeG (2)

Lugo is one of the four constituencies (Spanish: circunscripciones) represented in the Parliament of Galicia, the regional legislature of the autonomous community of Galicia. The constituency currently elects 14 deputies. Its boundaries correspond to those of the Spanish province of Lugo. The electoral system uses the D'Hondt method and closed-list proportional representation, with a minimum threshold of five percent.

== Electoral system ==
The constituency was created as per the Statute of Autonomy for Galicia of 1981 and was first contested in the 1981 regional election. The Statute provided for the four provinces in Galicia—A Coruña, Lugo, Ourense and Pontevedra—to be established as multi-member districts in the Parliament of Galicia, with this regulation being maintained under the 1985 regional electoral law. Each constituency is entitled to an initial minimum of 10 seats, with the remaining 35 being distributed in proportion to their populations. In the 1981 and 1985 elections, each constituency was allocated a fixed number of seats: 22 for A Coruña, 15 for Lugo, 15 for Ourense and 19 for Pontevedra.

Voting is on the basis of universal suffrage, which comprises all nationals over eighteen, registered in Galicia and in full enjoyment of their political rights. Amendments to the electoral law in 2011 required for Galicians abroad to apply for voting before being permitted to vote, a system known as "begged" or expat vote (Spanish: Voto rogado) which was abolished in 2022. Seats are elected using the D'Hondt method and a closed list proportional representation, with an electoral threshold of five percent of valid votes—which includes blank ballots; until a 1993 reform, the threshold was set at three percent—being applied in each constituency. The use of the D'Hondt method may result in a higher effective threshold, depending on the district magnitude.

The electoral law allows for parties and federations registered in the interior ministry, coalitions and groupings of electors to present lists of candidates. Parties and federations intending to form a coalition ahead of an election are required to inform the relevant Electoral Commission within ten days of the election call—fifteen before 1985—whereas groupings of electors need to secure the signature of at least one percent of the electorate in the constituencies for which they seek election—one-thousandth of the electorate, with a compulsory minimum of 500 signatures, until 1985—disallowing electors from signing for more than one list of candidates.

== Deputies ==
Deputies 1981–present
Key to parties BNPG/BNG AGE En Marea PSdeG CG UCD PP CP AP
Parliament	Election	Distribution
1st	1981	1 / 3 / 6 / 5
2nd	1985	4 / 3 / 8
3rd	1989	1 / 5 / 1 / 8
4th	1993	2 / 4 / 9
5th	1997	3 / 3 / 9
6th	2001	3 / 3 / 9
7th	2005	2 / 5 / 8
8th	2009	2 / 5 / 8
9th	2012	1 / 1 / 4 / 9
10th	2016	1 / 2 / 3 / 8
11th	2020	3 / 2 / 9
12th	2024	4 / 2 / 8

== Regional elections ==
=== 2024 ===
Summary of the 18 February 2024 Parliament of Galicia election results in Lugo
Parties and alliances	Popular vote			Seats	
Parties and alliances	Votes	%	±pp	Total	+/−
People's Party (PP)	100,123	53.33	–1.31	8	–1
Galician Nationalist Bloc (BNG)	46,940	25.00	+3.47	4	+1
Socialists' Party of Galicia (PSdeG–PSOE)	32,403	17.26	–0.16	2	±0
Vox (Vox)	3,517	1.87	–0.20	0	±0
Unite Galicia (Sumar Galicia)^{1}	1,198	0.64	n/a	0	±0
Blank Seats (EB)	577	0.31	New	0	±0
Animalist Party with the Environment (PACMA)^{2}	499	0.27	–0.05	0	±0
We Can Galicia (Podemos–AV)^{1}	381	0.20	n/a	0	±0
For a Fairer World (PUM+J)	256	0.14	+0.10	0	±0
Galicianist Common Space (ECG)	176	0.09	New	0	±0
Blank ballots	1,663	0.89	–0.04		
Total	187,733			14	±0
Valid votes	187,733	98.84	+0.16		
Invalid votes	2,206	1.16	–0.16		
Votes cast / turnout	189,939	56.24	+7.97		
Abstentions	147,806	43.76	–7.97		
Registered voters	337,745				
Sources
Footnotes: ^{1} Within the Galicia in Common–Renewal–Tides alliance in the 2020 election.; ^{2} Animalist Party with the Environment results are compared to Animalist Party Against Mistreatment of Animals totals in the 2020 election.

=== 2020 ===
Summary of the 12 July 2020 Parliament of Galicia election results in Lugo
Parties and alliances	Popular vote			Seats	
Parties and alliances	Votes	%	±pp	Total	+/−
People's Party (PP)	89,266	54.64	+1.83	9	+1
Galician Nationalist Bloc (BNG)	35,178	21.53	+14.16	3	+2
Socialists' Party of Galicia (PSdeG–PSOE)	28,465	17.42	–1.63	2	–1
Galicia in Common–Renewal–Tides (Podemos–EU–Anova)^{1}	3,715	2.27	–13.08	0	–2
Vox (Vox)	3,381	2.07	New	0	±0
Citizens–Party of the Citizenry (Cs)	592	0.36	–2.42	0	±0
Animalist Party Against Mistreatment of Animals (PACMA)	529	0.32	–0.49	0	±0
Galicianist Tide (En Marea–CxG–PG)^{2}	367	0.22	–0.02	0	±0
Zero Cuts–Common Space–The Greens–Municipalists (RC–EsCo–OV–M)	94	0.06	–0.12	0	±0
Communist Party of the Workers of Galicia (PCTG)	83	0.05	New	0	±0
Equo Galicia (Equo)	83	0.05	New	0	±0
For a Fairer World (PUM+J)	64	0.04	New	0	±0
XXI Convergence (C21)	40	0.02	–0.02	0	±0
Blank ballots	1,520	0.93	–0.03		
Total	163,377			14	±0
Valid votes	163,377	98.68	–0.14		
Invalid votes	2,189	1.32	+0.14		
Votes cast / turnout	165,566	48.27	–5.28		
Abstentions	177,417	51.73	+5.28		
Registered voters	342,983				
Sources
Footnotes: ^{1} Galicia in Common–Renewal–Tides results are compared to In Tide totals in the 2016 election.; ^{2} Galicianist Tide results are compared to Commitment to Galicia totals in the 2016 election.

=== 2016 ===
Summary of the 25 September 2016 Parliament of Galicia election results in Lugo
Parties and alliances	Popular vote			Seats	
Parties and alliances	Votes	%	±pp	Total	+/−
People's Party (PP)	97,323	52.81	+1.33	8	–1
Socialists' Party of Galicia (PSdeG–PSOE)	35,099	19.05	–3.62	3	–1
In Tide (En Marea)^{1}	28,285	15.35	+5.06	2	+1
Galician Nationalist Bloc–We–Galician Candidacy (BNG–Nós)	13,579	7.37	–1.34	1	±0
Citizens–Party of the Citizenry (C's)	5,117	2.78	New	0	±0
Animalist Party Against Mistreatment of Animals (PACMA)	1,491	0.81	+0.39	0	±0
Anti-Corruption and Justice Party (PAyJ)	466	0.25	New	0	±0
Commitment to Galicia (CxG)	439	0.24	–0.37	0	±0
Zero Cuts–Green Group (Recortes Cero–GV)	338	0.18	New	0	±0
Let's Win Galicia: Yes We Can (Gañemos)	311	0.17	New	0	±0
XXI Convergence (C21)	72	0.04	–0.01	0	±0
Blank ballots	1,770	0.96	–1.68		
Total	184,290			14	–1
Valid votes	184,290	98.82	+1.67		
Invalid votes	2,198	1.18	–1.67		
Votes cast / turnout	186,488	53.55	–2.45		
Abstentions	161,756	46.45	+2.45		
Registered voters	348,244				
Sources
Footnotes: ^{1} In Tide results are compared to Galician Left Alternative totals in the 2012 election.

=== 2012 ===
Summary of the 21 October 2012 Parliament of Galicia election results in Lugo
Parties and alliances	Popular vote			Seats	
Parties and alliances	Votes	%	±pp	Total	+/−
People's Party (PP)	98,284	51.48	+3.67	9	+1
Socialists' Party of Galicia (PSdeG–PSOE)	43,370	22.72	–9.98	4	–1
Galician Left Alternative (United Left–Anova) (AGE)^{1}	19,639	10.29	+9.65	1	+1
Galician Nationalist Bloc (BNG)	16,622	8.71	–5.87	1	–1
Union, Progress and Democracy (UPyD)	1,730	0.91	–0.22	0	±0
Blank Seats (EB)	1,440	0.75	New	0	±0
Commitment to Galicia (CxG)^{2}	1,173	0.61	–0.13	0	±0
Hartos.org (Hartos.org)	868	0.45	New	0	±0
Animalist Party Against Mistreatment of Animals (PACMA)	805	0.42	New	0	±0
Civil Society and Democracy (SCD)	623	0.33	New	0	±0
Land Party (PT)	352	0.18	New	0	±0
Liberal Democratic Centre (CDL)	234	0.12	New	0	±0
For a Fairer World (PUM+J)	233	0.12	–0.12	0	±0
Spanish Phalanx of the CNSO (FE–JONS)	184	0.10	+0.04	0	±0
Communist Unification of Spain (UCE)	138	0.07	New	0	±0
Community Integration Party (PYC)	106	0.06	New	0	±0
XXI Convergence (C.XXI)	87	0.05	New	0	±0
Blank ballots	5,036	2.64	+0.97		
Total	190,924			15	±0
Valid votes	190,924	97.15	–1.78		
Invalid votes	5,609	2.85	+1.78		
Votes cast / turnout	196,533	56.00	–10.92		
Abstentions	154,413	44.00	+10.92		
Registered voters	350,946				
Sources
Footnotes: ^{1} Galician Left Alternative results are compared to United Left totals in the 2009 election.; ^{2} Commitment to Galicia results are compared to Terra Galega totals in the 2009 election.

=== 2009 ===
Summary of the 1 March 2009 Parliament of Galicia election results in Lugo
Parties and alliances	Popular vote			Seats	
Parties and alliances	Votes	%	±pp	Total	+/−
People's Party (PP)	109,574	47.81	–1.09	8	±0
Socialists' Party of Galicia (PSdeG–PSOE)	74,949	32.70	–1.85	5	±0
Galician Nationalist Bloc (BNG)	33,415	14.58	+0.06	2	±0
Union, Progress and Democracy (UPyD)	2,579	1.13	New	0	±0
Galician Land (TeGa)	1,689	0.74	New	0	±0
United Left (EU–IU)	1,464	0.64	+0.29	0	±0
For a Fairer World (PUM+J)	540	0.24	New	0	±0
Galician People's Front (FPG)	268	0.12	±0.00	0	±0
United Galicia (GU)	247	0.11	New	0	±0
Humanist Party (PH)	168	0.07	–0.04	0	±0
We–People's Unity (Nós–UP)	164	0.07	–0.01	0	±0
More Galicia (+G)	163	0.07	New	0	±0
Spanish Phalanx of the CNSO (FE–JONS)	146	0.06	±0.00	0	±0
Blank ballots	3,831	1.67	+0.65		
Total	229,197			15	±0
Valid votes	229,197	98.93	–0.57		
Invalid votes	2,481	1.07	+0.57		
Votes cast / turnout	231,678	66.92	–1.65		
Abstentions	114,515	33.08	+1.65		
Registered voters	346,193				

=== 2005 ===
Summary of the 19 June 2005 Parliament of Galicia election results in Lugo
Parties and alliances	Popular vote			Seats	
Parties and alliances	Votes	%	±pp	Total	+/−
People's Party (PP)	115,650	48.90	–7.11	8	–1
Socialists' Party of Galicia (PSdeG–PSOE)	81,709	34.55	+12.95	5	+2
Galician Nationalist Bloc (BNG)	34,350	14.52	–5.01	2	–1
United Left (EU–IU)	836	0.35	–0.19	0	±0
Party of Self-employed and Professionals (AUTONOMO)	379	0.16	–0.03	0	±0
Democratic and Social Centre (CDS)	285	0.12	New	0	±0
Galician People's Front (FPG)	278	0.12	–0.05	0	±0
Humanist Party (PH)	270	0.11	–0.09	0	±0
We–People's Unity (Nós–UP)	193	0.08	New	0	±0
Spanish Phalanx of the CNSO (FE–JONS)	142	0.06	New	0	±0
Blank ballots	2,421	1.02	–0.22		
Total	236,513			15	±0
Valid votes	236,513	99.50	+0.22		
Invalid votes	1,196	0.50	–0.22		
Votes cast / turnout	237,709	68.57	+4.03		
Abstentions	108,974	31.43	–4.03		
Registered voters	346,683				

=== 2001 ===
Summary of the 21 October 2001 Parliament of Galicia election results in Lugo
Parties and alliances	Popular vote			Seats	
Parties and alliances	Votes	%	±pp	Total	+/−
People's Party (PP)	124,042	56.01	–1.70	9	±0
Socialists' Party of Galicia (PSdeG–PSOE)	47,838	21.60	+2.66	3	±0
Galician Nationalist Bloc (BNG)	43,252	19.53	–0.25	3	±0
United Left (EU–IU)	1,195	0.54	–0.32	0	±0
Galician Progressive Democracy (DPG)	650	0.29	–0.96	0	±0
Left of Galicia (EdeG)	492	0.22	New	0	±0
Humanist Party (PH)	445	0.20	+0.05	0	±0
Party of Self-employed and Professionals (AUTONOMO)	419	0.19	New	0	±0
Galician People's Front (FPG)	367	0.17	–0.02	0	±0
Blank ballots	2,752	1.24	+0.13		
Total	221,452			15	±0
Valid votes	221,452	99.28	–0.15		
Invalid votes	1,598	0.72	+0.15		
Votes cast / turnout	223,050	64.54	–0.45		
Abstentions	122,548	35.46	+0.45		
Registered voters	345,598				

=== 1997 ===
Summary of the 19 October 1997 Parliament of Galicia election results in Lugo
Parties and alliances	Popular vote			Seats	
Parties and alliances	Votes	%	±pp	Total	+/−
People's Party (PP)	131,270	57.71	+1.19	9	±0
Galician Nationalist Bloc (BNG)	44,992	19.78	+3.36	3	+1
Socialists' Party–Galician Left–The Greens (PSdeG–PSOE/EU–EG/Os Verdes)^{1}	43,082	18.94	–6.07	3	–1
Galician Democracy (DG)	2,843	1.25	New	0	±0
United Left (IU)	1,959	0.86	New	0	±0
Galician People's Front (FPG)	441	0.19	New	0	±0
Humanist Party (PH)	345	0.15	+0.05	0	±0
Blank ballots	2,531	1.11	+0.68		
Total	227,463			15	±0
Valid votes	227,463	99.43	–0.04		
Invalid votes	1,294	0.57	+0.04		
Votes cast / turnout	228,757	64.99	–1.86		
Abstentions	123,254	35.01	+1.86		
Registered voters	352,011				
Sources
Footnotes: ^{1} Socialists' Party–Galician Left–The Greens results are compared to the combined totals of the Socialists' Party of Galicia, United Left–Galician Unity and The Greens of Galicia in the 1993 election.

=== 1993 ===
Summary of the 17 October 1993 Parliament of Galicia election results in Lugo
Parties and alliances	Popular vote			Seats	
Parties and alliances	Votes	%	±pp	Total	+/−
People's Party (PP)	123,020	56.52	+8.44	9	+1
Socialists' Party of Galicia (PSdeG–PSOE)	50,270	23.09	–7.84	4	–1
Galician Nationalist Bloc (BNG)^{1}	35,838	16.46	+9.26	2	+1
United Left–Galician Unity (EU–UG)^{2}	3,329	1.53	–0.94	0	±0
Galician Coalition (CG)	936	0.43	–6.82	0	–1
Ruiz-Mateos Group–European Democratic Alliance (ARM–ADE)	920	0.42	+0.09	0	±0
The Greens of Galicia (Os Verdes)	854	0.39	+0.12	0	±0
The Ecologists (LE)	299	0.14	+0.02	0	±0
Galician Alternative (AG)	223	0.10	New	0	±0
Humanist Citizen Platform (PCH)	216	0.10	+0.08	0	±0
United People's Assembly (APU)	186	0.09	New	0	±0
Blank ballots	1,584	0.43	+0.40		
Total	217,675			15	±0
Valid votes	217,675	99.47	+0.05		
Invalid votes	1,167	0.53	–0.05		
Votes cast / turnout	218,842	66.85	+3.74		
Abstentions	108,509	33.15	–3.74		
Registered voters	327,351				
Sources
Footnotes: ^{1} Galician Nationalist Bloc results are compared to the combined totals of Galician Nationalist Bloc and Galician Nationalist Party–Galicianist Party totals in the 1989 election.; ^{2} United Left–Galician Unity results are compared to the combined totals of Galician Socialist Party–Galician Left and United Left totals in the 1989 election.

=== 1989 ===
Summary of the 17 December 1989 Parliament of Galicia election results in Lugo
Parties and alliances	Popular vote			Seats	
Parties and alliances	Votes	%	±pp	Total	+/−
People's Party (PP)^{1}	101,146	48.08	+3.20	8	±0
Socialists' Party of Galicia (PSdeG–PSOE)	65,058	30.93	+6.57	5	+1
Galician Coalition (CG)	15,250	7.25	–13.17	1	–2
Galician Nationalist Bloc (BNG)	13,902	6.61	+3.34	1	+1
Democratic and Social Centre (CDS)	5,499	2.61	+0.13	0	±0
Galician Socialist Party–Galician Left (PSG–EG)	3,587	1.71	–0.29	0	±0
United Left (EU)^{2}	1,605	0.76	+0.14	0	±0
Galician Nationalist Party–Galicianist Party (PNG–PG)	1,241	0.59	New	0	±0
Ruiz-Mateos Group (ARM)	685	0.33	New	0	±0
The Greens of Galicia (OVG)	571	0.27	New	0	±0
Workers' Socialist Party (PST)	274	0.13	New	0	±0
The Ecologist Greens (OVE)	251	0.12	New	0	±0
United Galicia Party (PGU)	170	0.08	New	0	±0
Galician People's Front (FPG)	164	0.08	New	0	±0
Communist Party of Spain (Marxist–Leninist) (PCE (m–l))	77	0.04	–0.06	0	±0
Alliance for the Republic (AxR)	72	0.03	New	0	±0
Spanish Phalanx of the CNSO (FE–JONS)	63	0.03	–0.09	0	±0
Humanist Platform (PH)	44	0.02	–0.36	0	±0
Blank ballots	701	0.33	–0.31		
Total	210,360			15	±0
Valid votes	210,360	99.42	+0.42		
Invalid votes	1,235	0.58	–0.42		
Votes cast / turnout	211,595	63.11	+6.15		
Abstentions	123,661	36.89	–6.15		
Registered voters	335,256				
Sources
Footnotes: ^{1} People's Party results are compared to People's Coalition totals in the 1985 election.; ^{2} United Left results are compared to Communist Party of Galicia totals in the 1985 election.

=== 1985 ===
Summary of the 24 November 1985 Parliament of Galicia election results in Lugo
Parties and alliances	Popular vote			Seats	
Parties and alliances	Votes	%	±pp	Total	+/−
People's Coalition (AP–PDP–PL)^{1}	85,904	44.88	+13.53	8	+3
Socialists' Party of Galicia (PSdG–PSOE)	46,627	24.36	+8.28	4	+1
Galician Coalition (CG)	39,080	20.42	New	3	+3
Galician Nationalist Bloc (BNG)^{2}	6,260	3.27	–4.76	0	–1
Democratic and Social Centre (CDS)	4,742	2.48	New	0	±0
Galician Socialist Party–Galician Left (PSG–EG)^{3}	3,826	2.00	+1.09	0	±0
Communist Party of Galicia (PCE–PCG)	1,182	0.62	–0.85	0	±0
Communist Party of Galicia (Revolutionary Marxist) (PCG (m–r))	760	0.40	New	0	±0
Humanist Platform (PH)	720	0.38	New	0	±0
Galician Party of the Country (PGC)	644	0.34	New	0	±0
Spanish Phalanx of the CNSO (FE–JONS)	226	0.12	New	0	±0
Communist Party of Spain (Marxist–Leninist) (PCE (m–l))	199	0.10	New	0	±0
Union of the Democratic Centre (UCD)	n/a	n/a	–35.03	0	–6
Blank ballots	1,231	0.64	+0.64		
Total	191,401			15	±0
Valid votes	191,401	99.00	+0.71		
Invalid votes	1,943	1.00	–0.71		
Votes cast / turnout	193,344	56.96	+14.44		
Abstentions	146,065	43.04	–14.44		
Registered voters	339,409				
Sources
Footnotes: ^{1} People's Coalition results are compared to People's Alliance totals in the 1981 election.; ^{2} Galician Nationalist Bloc results are compared to Galician National-Popular Bloc–Galician Socialist Party totals in the 1981 election.; ^{3} Galician Socialist Party–Galician Left results are compared to Galician Left totals in the 1981 election.

=== 1981 ===
Summary of the 20 October 1981 Parliament of Galicia election results in Lugo
Parties and alliances	Popular vote			Seats	
Parties and alliances	Votes	%	±pp	Total	+/−
Union of the Democratic Centre (UCD)	48,733	35.03	n/a	6	n/a
People's Alliance (AP)	43,617	31.35	n/a	5	n/a
Socialists' Party of Galicia (PSdG–PSOE)	22,376	16.08	n/a	3	n/a
Galician National-Popular Bloc–Galician Socialist Party (BNPG–PSG)	11,175	8.03	n/a	1	n/a
Galicianist Party (PG)	5,779	4.15	n/a	0	n/a
Communist Party of Galicia (PCG–PCE)	2,039	1.47	n/a	0	n/a
Galician Socialist Unity–PSOE (USG–PSOE)	1,546	1.11	n/a	0	n/a
Workers' Socialist Party (PST)	1,498	1.08	n/a	0	n/a
Galician Left (EG)	1,272	0.91	n/a	0	n/a
Spanish Ruralist Party (PRE)	654	0.47	n/a	0	n/a
Revolutionary Communist League–Communist Movement (LCR–MCG)	437	0.31	n/a	0	n/a
Blank ballots	0	0.00	n/a		
Total	139,126			15	n/a
Valid votes	139,126	98.29	n/a		
Invalid votes	2,415	1.71	n/a		
Votes cast / turnout	141,541	42.52	n/a		
Abstentions	191,361	57.48	n/a		
Registered voters	332,902				
