= Anxo Guerreiro =

Spanish politician

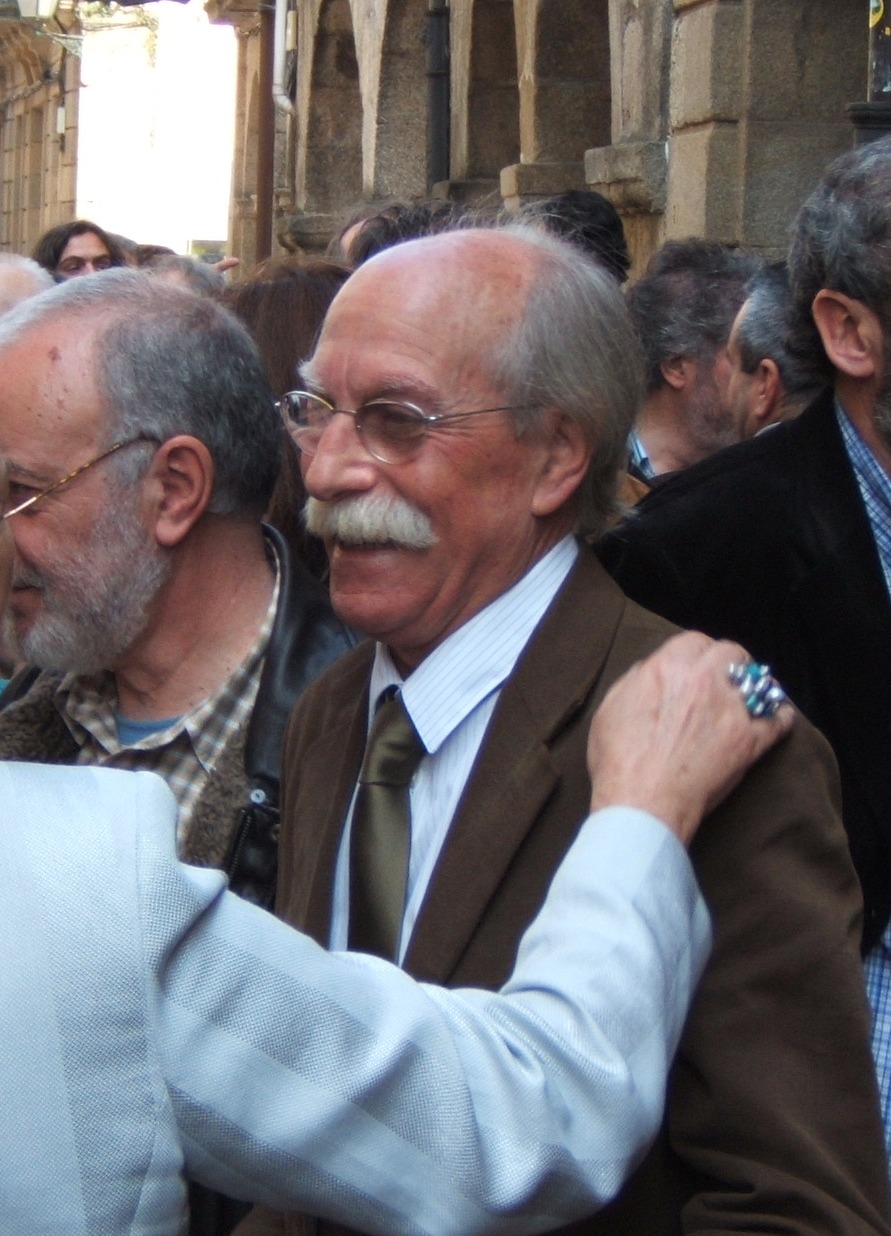
Guerreiro in 2007

Ángel Guerreiro Carreiras (28 August 1945 – 18 July 2013), mostly known by the forename Anxo (the Galician form of the Spanish Ángel) and nicknamed "Geluco", was a Spanish politician. He was a member of the Parliament of Galicia for the Communist Party of Galicia (1981–1985) and the Left of Galicia (1997–2001), and led both parties.

== Biography ==
Guerreiro was born in Xermade in the Province of Lugo. While studying chemistry at the University of Santiago de Compostela, he joined the Communist Party of Spain (PCE) which was still outlawed by Francisco Franco. Inspired by the May 68 protests in Paris, he took part in clandestine political activity and was imprisoned three times.

In the late 1970s, Guerreiro became part of the central committees of both the Communist Party of Galicia (PCG) and the nationwide party, before becoming secretary general of the former in 1979. In 1981, he was the only Communist voted into the Galician Parliament in the region's first elections. He was one of 16 authors of the region's Statute of Autonomy. In November 1983, he was replaced as party leader by Julio Pérez de la Fuente, who stood on a more pro-Soviet platform than Guerreiro's reformist Eurocommunism.

Having lost his seat in the 1985 election, in 1987 Guerreiro founded Galicia's United Left, the regional branch of the PCE-led coalition of the same name. In 1997, he wished to contest the Galician elections in alliance with the Spanish Socialist Workers' Party (PSOE), which was rejected by the national United Left. Because of this, he set up a new party called Left of Galicia (EdeG), and was re-reelected. The pact was not renewed for 2001 and he failed re-election, resigning and dissolving the party the following year.

In his later years, Guerreiro remained active as a political pundit. He died on 18 July 2013 in A Coruña, at age 67.
