= 2001 Galician regional election =

Election in the Spanish region of Galicia

- 21 October 2001

All 75 seats in the Parliament of Galicia 38 seats needed for a majority
- Opinion polls
- Registered: 2,567,670 ▲0.1%
- Turnout: 1,544,687 (60.2%) ▼2.3 pp
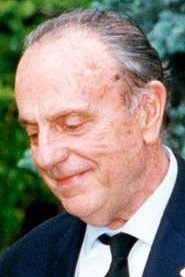

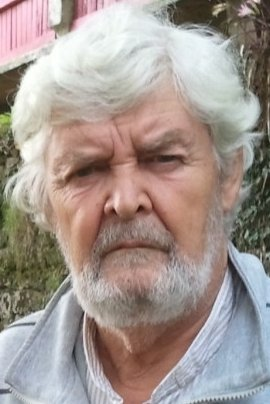

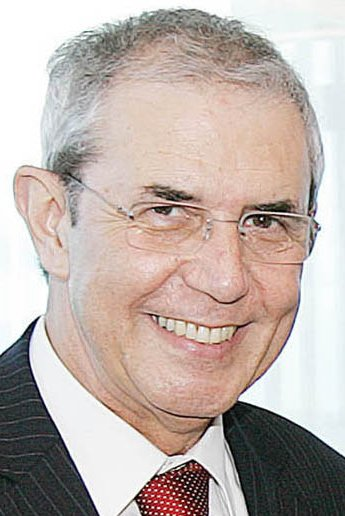
	First party	Second party	Third party
Leader	Manuel Fraga	Xosé Manuel Beiras	Emilio Pérez Touriño
Party	PP	BNG	PSdeG–PSOE
Leader since	1989	1982	10 October 1998
Leader's seat	Lugo	A Coruña	Pontevedra
Last election	42 seats, 52.2%	18 seats, 24.8%	15 seats, 19.5% (Note: Results for PSdeG–PSOE/EU–EG/OV in the 1997 election.)
Seats won	41	17	17
Seat change	▼1	▼1	▲2
Popular vote	791,885	346,430	334,819
Percentage	51.6%	22.6%	21.8%
Swing	▼0.6 pp	▼2.2 pp	▲2.3 pp
- Constituency results map for the Parliament of Galicia
President before election
Manuel Fraga
PP
President after election
Manuel Fraga
PP

A regional election was held in Galicia on 21 October 2001 to elect the 6th Parliament of the autonomous community. All 75 seats in the Parliament were up for election.

== Overview ==
Under the 1981 Statute of Autonomy, the Parliament of Galicia was the unicameral legislature of the homonymous autonomous community, having legislative power in devolved matters, as well as the ability to grant or withdraw confidence from a regional president. The electoral and procedural rules were supplemented by national law provisions.

=== Date ===
The term of the Parliament of Galicia expired four years after the date of its previous election, unless it was dissolved earlier. The election decree was required to be issued no later than 25 days before the scheduled expiration date of parliament and published on the following day in the Official Journal of Galicia (DOG), with election day taking place 54 days after the decree's publication. The previous election was held on 19 October 1997, which meant that the legislature's term would have expired on 19 October 2001. The election decree was required to be published in the DOG no later than 25 September 2001, setting the latest possible date for election day on 18 November 2001.

The regional president had the prerogative to dissolve the Parliament of Galicia at any given time and call a snap election, provided that it did not occur before one year after a previous one under this procedure. In the event of an investiture process failing to elect a regional president within a two-month period from the first ballot, the Parliament was to be automatically dissolved and a fresh election called.

The Parliament of Galicia was officially dissolved on 28 August 2001 with the publication of the corresponding decree in the DOG, setting election day for 21 October and scheduling for the chamber to reconvene on 20 November.

=== Electoral system ===
Voting for the Parliament was based on universal suffrage, comprising all Spanish nationals over 18 years of age, registered in Galicia and with full political rights, provided that they had not been deprived of the right to vote by a final sentence, nor were legally incapacitated.

The Parliament of Galicia had a minimum of 60 and a maximum of 80 seats, with electoral provisions fixing its size at 75. All were elected in four multi-member constituencies—corresponding to the provinces of A Coruña, Lugo, Ourense and Pontevedra, each of which was assigned an initial minimum of 10 seats and the remaining 35 distributed in proportion to population—using the D'Hondt method and closed-list proportional voting, with a five percent-threshold of valid votes (including blank ballots) in each constituency. The use of this electoral method resulted in a higher effective threshold depending on district magnitude and vote distribution.

As a result of the aforementioned allocation, each Parliament constituency was entitled the following seats:

Seats	Constituencies (Note: The provinces of La Coruña and Orense were officially renamed as "A Coruña" and "Ourense" on 4 April 1998.)
24	A Coruña
22	Pontevedra
15	Lugo
14	Ourense

The law did not provide for by-elections to fill vacant seats; instead, any vacancies arising after the proclamation of candidates and during the legislative term were filled by the next candidates on the party lists or, when required, by designated substitutes.

=== Outgoing parliament ===
The table below shows the composition of the parliamentary groups in the chamber at the time of dissolution.

Parliamentary composition in August 2001
Groups	Parties	Legislators	
Groups	Parties	Seats	Total
People's Parliamentary Group of Galicia	PP	42	42
Galician Nationalist Bloc's Parliamentary Group	BNG	18	18
Socialists of Galicia's Parliamentary Group	PSdeG–PSOE	13	13
Mixed Parliamentary Group	EdeG	2	2

== Parties and candidates ==
The electoral law allowed for parties and federations registered in the interior ministry, alliances and groupings of electors to present lists of candidates. Parties and federations intending to form an alliance were required to inform the relevant electoral commission within 10 days of the election call, whereas groupings of electors needed to secure the signature of at least one percent of the electorate in the constituencies for which they sought election, disallowing electors from signing for more than one list.

Below is a list of the main parties and alliances which contested the election:

Candidacy	Parties and alliances	Leading candidate	Ideology	Previous result		Gov.	Ref.
Candidacy	Parties and alliances	Leading candidate	Ideology	Vote %	Seats	Gov.	Ref.
PP	List: People's Party (PP)	Manuel Fraga	Conservatism; Christian democracy	52.2%	42	Yes	
BNG	List: Galician Nationalist Bloc (BNG) – Galician People's Union (UPG) – Socialist Collective (CS) – Galician Nationalist Party–Galicianist Party (PNG–PG) – Nationalist Left (EN) – Inzar (Inzar) – Galician Unity (UG)	Xosé Manuel Beiras	Galician nationalism Left-wing nationalism Socialism	24.8%	18	No	
PSdeG– PSOE	List: Socialists' Party of Galicia (PSdeG–PSOE)	Emilio Pérez Touriño	Social democracy	19.5%	15	No	

== Opinion polls ==
The tables below list opinion polling results in reverse chronological order, showing the most recent first and using the dates when the survey fieldwork was done, as opposed to the date of publication. Where the fieldwork dates are unknown, the date of publication is given instead. The highest percentage figure in each polling survey is displayed with its background shaded in the leading party's colour. If a tie ensues, this is applied to the figures with the highest percentages. The "Lead" column on the right shows the percentage-point difference between the parties with the highest percentages in a poll.

=== Voting intention estimates ===
The table below lists weighted voting intention estimates. Refusals are generally excluded from the party vote percentages, while question wording and the treatment of "don't know" responses and those not intending to vote may vary between polling organisations. When available, seat projections determined by the polling organisations are displayed below (or in place of) the percentages in a smaller font; 38 seats were required for an absolute majority in the Parliament of Galicia.

Color key:

Poll conducted after legal ban on opinion polls Exit poll

Polling firm/Commissioner	Fieldwork date	Sample size	Turnout	PP	BNG	PSdeG–PSOE	EU–IU	Lead
2001 regional election	21 Oct 2001	—N/a	60.2	51.6; 41	22.6; 17	21.8; 17	0.7; 0	29.0
Ipsos–Eco/TVG	21 Oct 2001	25,000	?	52.2; 42/44	23.4; 18/19	19.1; 13/14	0.9; 0	28.8
Sigma Dos/Antena 3	21 Oct 2001	18,000	?	52.0; 41/43	25.1; 18/19	19.8; 14/15	–	26.9
Sondaxe/Tele 5	12–20 Oct 2001	4,375	?	51.4; 42/43	27.1; 18/19	19.0; 13/14	–	24.3
Sondaxe/La Voz de Galicia	9–13 Oct 2001	2,500	?	51.3; 41	25.9; 19	20.5; 15	–	25.4
Sondaxe/La Voz de Galicia	8–12 Oct 2001	2,500	?	50.8; 41	26.3; 19	20.7; 15	–	24.5
Sondaxe/La Voz de Galicia	7–11 Oct 2001	2,500	?	51.7; 41	25.7; 19	20.5; 15	–	26.0
Sondaxe/La Voz de Galicia	6–10 Oct 2001	2,500	?	51.6; 42	25.6; 18	20.5; 15	–	26.0
USC	5–10 Oct 2001	?	?	48.3; 39/41	26.8; 18/20	23.1; 15/18	–	21.5
Sondaxe/La Voz de Galicia	5–9 Oct 2001	2,500	?	51.6; 41	25.9; 19	20.4; 15	–	25.7
Sondaxe/La Voz de Galicia	4–8 Oct 2001	2,500	?	50.6; 41	26.6; 19	20.8; 15	–	24.0
Sondaxe/La Voz de Galicia	3–7 Oct 2001	2,500	?	50.0; 40	26.8; 20	21.2; 15	–	23.2
Sondaxe/La Voz de Galicia	2–6 Oct 2001	2,500	?	49.5; 39	26.7; 20	21.6; 16	–	22.8
Celeste-Tel/Terra	5 Oct 2001	?	?	49.7; 40	24.4; 18	22.7; 17	–	25.3
Sondaxe/La Voz de Galicia	1–5 Oct 2001	2,500	?	49.3; 40	26.4; 19	22.0; 16	–	22.9
Sondaxe/La Voz de Galicia	30 Sep–4 Oct 2001	2,500	?	50.6; 40	25.6; 19	21.7; 16	–	25.0
Sondaxe/La Voz de Galicia	29 Sep–3 Oct 2001	2,500	?	51.7; 42	24.9; 17	21.2; 16	–	26.8
Opina/Cadena SER	2 Oct 2001	?	?	50.0; 39/40	26.0; 19/20	20.5; 15/17	1.0; 0	24.0
Sondaxe/La Voz de Galicia	28 Sep–2 Oct 2001	2,500	?	51.8; 42	25.0; 18	21.0; 15	–	26.8
Sondaxe/La Voz de Galicia	27 Sep–1 Oct 2001	2,500	?	51.7; 42	25.1; 18	20.9; 15	–	26.6
Sondaxe/La Voz de Galicia	26–30 Sep 2001	2,500	?	51.7; 41	25.4; 19	20.7; 15	–	26.3
CIS	15–30 Sep 2001	2,991	64.0	49.7; 39/41	25.2; 18/20	21.4; 15/17	1.0; 0	24.5
Sondaxe/La Voz de Galicia	25–29 Sep 2001	2,500	?	51.2; 41	25.6; 19	20.8; 15	–	25.6
Infortécnica/La Región	10–17 Sep 2001	?	?	49.6; 38/40	24.8; 18	23.6; 17/19	–	24.8
Sondaxe/La Voz de Galicia	3–7 Sep 2001	2,400	?	50.4; 40/41	26.0; 19	21.2; 15/16	–	24.4
Infortécnica/La Región	Aug 2001	?	?	49.1; 38/40	26.2; 19/20	22.7; 16/17	–	22.9
PP	29 Jul 2001	2,000	?	? 39/41	? 17/18	? 17/18	–	?
USC	18 Jul 2001	?	?	49.9; 39/40	25.7; 18	23.3; 17/18	–	24.2
Sondaxe/La Voz de Galicia	14 Jul 2001	?	?	47.1; 37/40	27.2; 19/20	22.8; 16/18	–	19.9
PSOE	Jul 2001	?	?	? 38/39	? 18	? 18/19	–	?
PP	2 Jun 2001	?	?	? 39	? 20	? 16	–	?
Infortécnica/La Región	Jun 2001	?	?	50.7; 40	27.0; 20	21.4; 15	–	23.7
Sondaxe/La Voz de Galicia (Note: Undecided and/or abstentionists excluded.)	14 Apr 2001	?	61.5	50.7	24.4	19.5	–	26.3
Sondaxe/BNG	24 Mar 2001	?	?	46.2; 37	28.0; 21	23.0; 17	–	18.2
Sondaxe/La Voz de Galicia	1 Jan 2001	?	71.0	48.0	28.5	18.7	–	19.5
USC	11–23 Dec 2000	?	?	50.1; 39	25.5; 18	23.9; 18	–	24.6
Sondaxe/La Voz de Galicia	23 Sep 2000	?	71.5	48.7	28.5	17.1	–	20.2
Sondaxe/La Voz de Galicia	2 Jul 2000	?	73.8	50.3	28.3	15.7	–	22.0
Sondaxe/La Voz de Galicia	2 Apr 2000	?	73.1	48.4	31.6	15.0	–	16.8
2000 general election	12 Mar 2000	—N/a	65.0	54.0 (45)	18.6 (13)	23.7 (17)	1.3 (0)	30.3
Sondaxe/La Voz de Galicia	23 Jan 2000	?	71.2	50.3	30.2	18.8	–	20.1
Sondaxe/La Voz de Galicia	19 Sep 1999	?	73.9	49.4	30.9	18.0	–	18.5
1999 EP election	13 Jun 1999	—N/a	60.8	49.9 (42)	22.0 (16)	23.6 (17)	1.1 (0)	26.3
1997 regional election	19 Oct 1997	—N/a	62.5	52.2; 42	24.8; 18	19.5; 15	0.9; 0	27.4

=== Voting preferences ===
The table below lists raw, unweighted voting preferences.

Polling firm/Commissioner	Fieldwork date	Sample size	PP	BNG	PSdeG–PSOE	EU–IU	Question	X mark	Lead
2001 regional election (Note: Does not include non-resident citizens.)	21 Oct 2001	—N/a	29.0	13.3	12.5	0.4	—N/a	35.8	15.7
CIS	15–30 Sep 2001	2,991	31.2	13.2	12.1	0.6	34.7	4.5	18.0
2000 general election	12 Mar 2000	—N/a	37.1	13.2	16.2	0.9	—N/a	30.5	20.9
1999 EP election	13 Jun 1999	—N/a	32.4	14.5	15.2	0.7	—N/a	34.4	17.2
1997 regional election	19 Oct 1997	—N/a	30.9	15.3	11.6	0.5	—N/a	33.7	15.6

=== Victory preferences ===
The table below lists opinion polling on the victory preferences for each party in the event of a regional election taking place.

Polling firm/Commissioner	Fieldwork date	Sample size	PP	BNG	PSdeG–PSOE	EU–IU	Other/ None	Question	Lead
CIS	15–30 Sep 2001	2,991	35.7	14.7	14.4	0.6	7.3	27.2	21.0

=== Preferred President ===
The table below lists opinion polling on leader preferences to become president of the Regional Government of Galicia.

Polling firm/Commissioner	Fieldwork date	Sample size				Other/ None/ Not care	Question	Lead
Polling firm/Commissioner	Fieldwork date	Sample size	Fraga PP	Beiras BNG	Touriño PSdeG	Other/ None/ Not care	Question	Lead
CIS	15–30 Sep 2001	2,991	37.2	14.8	12.2	13.5	22.4	22.4

== Results ==
=== Overall ===
← Summary of the 21 October 2001 Parliament of Galicia election results →
Parties and alliances	Popular vote			Seats	
Parties and alliances	Votes	%	±pp	Total	+/−
People's Party (PP)	791,885	51.62	−0.57	41	−1
Galician Nationalist Bloc (BNG)	346,430	22.58	−2.20	17	−1
Socialists' Party of Galicia (PSdeG–PSOE)	334,819	21.83	+2.37	17	+2
United Left (EU–IU)	10,431	0.68	−0.20	0	±0
Galician Progressive Democracy (DPG)	6,938	0.45	−0.27	0	±0
Left of Galicia (EdeG)	5,001	0.33	New	0	±0
Party of Self-employed and Professionals (AUTONOMO)	4,481	0.29	+0.16	0	±0
Humanist Party (PH)	4,137	0.27	+0.11	0	±0
Galician People's Front (FPG)	3,176	0.21	±0.00	0	±0
Social Democratic Party of Law (SDD)	646	0.04	−0.03	0	±0
Blank ballots	25,988	1.69	+0.38		
Total	1,533,932			75	±0
Valid votes	1,533,932	99.30	−0.20		
Invalid votes	10,755	0.70	+0.20		
Votes cast / turnout	1,544,687	60.16	−2.35		
Abstentions	1,022,983	39.84	+2.35		
Registered voters	2,567,670				

Popular vote
PP	51.62%
BNG	22.58%
PSdeG–PSOE	21.83%
Others	2.27%
Blank ballots	1.69%

Seats
PP	54.67%
BNG	22.67%
PSdeG–PSOE	22.67%

=== Distribution by constituency ===
Constituency	PP		BNG		PSdeG	
Constituency	%	S	%	S	%	S
A Coruña	48.7	12	24.1	6	22.9	6
Lugo	56.0	9	19.5	3	21.6	3
Ourense	57.4	8	20.3	3	19.3	3
Pontevedra	50.8	12	23.1	5	21.7	5
Total	51.6	41	22.6	17	21.8	17

== Aftermath ==
=== Government formation ===
Investiture; Nomination of Manuel Fraga (PP)
Ballot →	5 December 2001
Required majority →	38 out of 75
Yes: • PP (41)	41 / 75
No: • BNG (17); • PSdeG (17)	34 / 75
Abstentions	0 / 75
Absentees	0 / 75

=== 2002 motions of no confidence ===
Motion of no confidence Nomination of Xosé Manuel Beiras (BNG)
Ballot →	12 December 2002
Required majority →	38 out of 75
Yes: • BNG (17); • PSdeG (17)	34 / 75
No: • PP (41)	41 / 75
Abstentions	0 / 75
Absentees	0 / 75

Motion of no confidence Nomination of Emilio Pérez Touriño (PSdeG)
Ballot →	12 December 2002
Required majority →	38 out of 75
Yes: • BNG (17); • PSdeG (17)	34 / 75
No: • PP (41)	41 / 75
Abstentions	0 / 75
Absentees	0 / 75

== Bibliography ==
- Ley Orgánica 1/1981, de 6 de abril, de Estatuto de Autonomía para Galicia (Organic Law 1/1981). Official State Gazette (in Spanish). 6 April 1981 [version as of 4 March 1998]. BOE-A-1981-9564.
- Ley 1/1983, de 22 de febrero, reguladora de la Junta y su Presidente (Law 1/1983). Official State Gazette (in Spanish). 22 February 1983 [version as of 10 October 1989]. BOE-A-1983-23788.
- Ley Orgánica 5/1985, de 19 de junio, del Régimen Electoral General (Organic Law 5/1985). Official State Gazette (in Spanish). 19 June 1985 [version as of 30 June 2000]. BOE-A-1985-11672.
- Ley 8/1985, de 13 de agosto, de elecciones al Parlamento de Galicia (Law 8/1985). Official State Gazette (in Spanish). 13 August 1985 [version as of 4 January 1993]. BOE-A-1985-21380.
- Ley 2/1998, 3 de marzo, sobre el cambio de denominación de las provincias de La Coruña y Orense (Law 2/1998). Official State Gazette (in Spanish). 3 March 1998. BOE-A-1998-5184.
- Decreto 197/2001, de 27 de agosto, de disolución del Parlamento de Galicia y de convocatoria de elecciones (Decree 197/2001). Official Journal of Galicia (in Spanish). 27 August 2001.
