= 1993 Galician regional election =

Election in the Spanish region of Galicia

- 17 October 1993

All 75 seats in the Parliament of Galicia 38 seats needed for a majority
- Opinion polls
- Registered: 2,293,169 ▲2.1%
- Turnout: 1,472,017 (64.2%) ▲4.7 pp
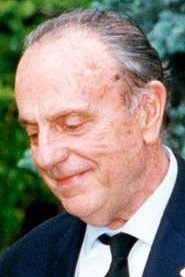

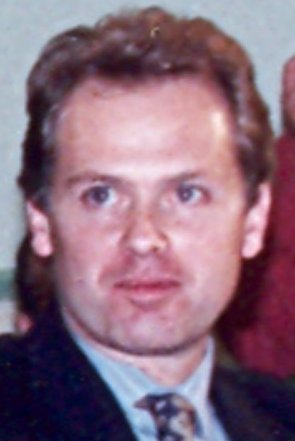

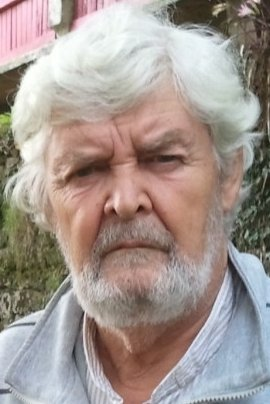
	First party	Second party	Third party
Leader	Manuel Fraga	Antolín Sánchez	Xosé Manuel Beiras
Party	PP	PSdeG–PSOE	BNG
Leader since	1989	10 February 1991	1982
Leader's seat	Lugo	La Coruña	La Coruña
Last election	38 seats, 44.0%	28 seats, 32.7%	5 seats, 9.3% (Note: Results for BNG (8.0%, 5 seats) and PNG–PG (1.4%, 0 seats) in the 1989 election.)
Seats won	43	19	13
Seat change	▲5	▼9	▲8
Popular vote	763,839	346,831	269,233
Percentage	52.1%	23.7%	18.4%
Swing	▲8.1 pp	▼9.0 pp	▲9.1 pp
- Constituency results map for the Parliament of Galicia
President before election
Manuel Fraga
PP
President after election
Manuel Fraga
PP

A regional election was held in Galicia on 17 October 1993 to elect the 4th Parliament of the autonomous community. All 75 seats in the Parliament were up for election.

The People's Party (PP) won with an increased absolute majority over 1989, resulting in Manuel Fraga being re-elected for a second term in office as President of Galicia. The Socialists' Party of Galicia (PSdeG–PSOE) suffered from a crisis of leadership and from a desire of punishment to the national government of Felipe González, losing many votes in the way. Meanwhile, the Galician Nationalist Bloc (BNG) began to appear as the main alternative to power thanks to its spokesman, Xosé Manuel Beiras's, charisma.

The Galician Unity coalition of United Left (EU) and the Galician Socialist Party–Galician Left (PSG–EG) did not enter Parliament due to a change of the electoral law which raised the electoral threshold from 3% to 5%. Galician Coalition (CG) also failed to enter Parliament, and only got 0.4% of the share.

== Overview ==
Under the 1981 Statute of Autonomy, the Parliament of Galicia was the unicameral legislature of the homonymous autonomous community, having legislative power in devolved matters, as well as the ability to grant or withdraw confidence from a regional president. The electoral and procedural rules were supplemented by national law provisions.

=== Date ===
The term of the Parliament of Galicia expired four years after the date of its previous election, unless it was dissolved earlier. The election decree was required to be issued no later than 25 days before the scheduled expiration date of parliament and published on the following day in the Official Journal of Galicia (DOG), with election day taking place between 54 and 60 days after the decree's publication. The previous election was held on 17 December 1989, which meant that the legislature's term would have expired on 17 December 1993. The election decree was required to be published in the DOG no later than 23 November 1993, setting the latest possible date for election day on 22 January 1994.

The regional president had the prerogative to dissolve the Parliament of Galicia at any given time and call a snap election, provided that it did not occur before one year after a previous one under this procedure. In the event of an investiture process failing to elect a regional president within a two-month period from the first ballot, the Parliament was to be automatically dissolved and a fresh election called.

The Parliament of Galicia was officially dissolved on 24 August 1993 with the publication of the corresponding decree in the DOG, setting election day for 17 October and scheduling for the chamber to reconvene on 16 November.

=== Electoral system ===
Voting for the Parliament was based on universal suffrage, comprising all Spanish nationals over 18 years of age, registered in Galicia and with full political rights, provided that they had not been deprived of the right to vote by a final sentence, nor were legally incapacitated.

The Parliament of Galicia had a minimum of 60 and a maximum of 80 seats, with electoral provisions fixing its size at 75. All were elected in four multi-member constituencies—corresponding to the provinces of A Coruña, Lugo, Ourense and Pontevedra, each of which was assigned an initial minimum of 10 seats and the remaining 35 distributed in proportion to population—using the D'Hondt method and closed-list proportional voting, with a five (Note: Amendments earlier in 1993 had seen the electoral threshold being increased from three to five percent.) percent-threshold of valid votes (including blank ballots) in each constituency. The use of this electoral method resulted in a higher effective threshold depending on district magnitude and vote distribution.

As a result of the aforementioned allocation, each Parliament constituency was entitled the following seats:

Seats	Constituencies
24	La Coruña
21	Pontevedra
15	Lugo, Orense

The law did not provide for by-elections to fill vacant seats; instead, any vacancies arising after the proclamation of candidates and during the legislative term were filled by the next candidates on the party lists or, when required, by designated substitutes.

=== Outgoing parliament ===
The table below shows the composition of the parliamentary groups in the chamber at the time of dissolution.

Parliamentary composition in August 1993
Groups	Parties	Legislators	
Groups	Parties	Seats	Total
People's Parliamentary Group of Galicia	PP	38	38
Socialists of Galicia's Parliamentary Group	PSdeG–PSOE	28	28
Galician Nationalist Bloc's Parliamentary Group	UPG	2	5
Galician Nationalist Bloc's Parliamentary Group	EN	2	5
Galician Nationalist Bloc's Parliamentary Group	CS	1	5
Mixed Parliamentary Group	UG	2	4
Mixed Parliamentary Group	CG	2	4

== Parties and candidates ==
The electoral law allowed for parties and federations registered in the interior ministry, alliances and groupings of electors to present lists of candidates. Parties and federations intending to form an alliance were required to inform the relevant electoral commission within 10 days of the election call, whereas groupings of electors needed to secure the signature of at least one percent of the electorate in the constituencies for which they sought election, disallowing electors from signing for more than one list.

Below is a list of the main parties and alliances which contested the election:

Candidacy	Parties and alliances	Leading candidate	Ideology	Previous result		Gov.	Ref.
Candidacy	Parties and alliances	Leading candidate	Ideology	Vote %	Seats	Gov.	Ref.
PP	List: People's Party (PP)	Manuel Fraga	Conservatism; Christian democracy	44.0%	38	Yes	
PSdeG– PSOE	List: Socialists' Party of Galicia (PSdeG–PSOE)	Antolín Sánchez	Social democracy	32.7%	28	No	
BNG	List: Galician Nationalist Bloc (BNG) – Galician People's Union (UPG) – Socialist Collective (CS) – Galician Nationalist Party–Galicianist Party (PNG–PG) – Nationalist Left (EN) – Inzar (Inzar)	Xosé Manuel Beiras	Galician nationalism Left-wing nationalism Socialism	9.3%	5	No	
EU–UG	List: United Left (EU); Galician Unity (UG)	Camilo Nogueira	Socialism; Communism	5.3% (Note: Results for PSG–EG (3.8%, 2 seats) and EU (1.5%, 0 seats) in the 1989 election.)	2	No	
CG	List: Galician Coalition (CG)	César Quintián Noas	Galician nationalism Liberalism; Christian democracy	3.6%	2	No	

== Opinion polls ==
The tables below list opinion polling results in reverse chronological order, showing the most recent first and using the dates when the survey fieldwork was done, as opposed to the date of publication. Where the fieldwork dates are unknown, the date of publication is given instead. The highest percentage figure in each polling survey is displayed with its background shaded in the leading party's colour. If a tie ensues, this is applied to the figures with the highest percentages. The "Lead" column on the right shows the percentage-point difference between the parties with the highest percentages in a poll.

=== Voting intention estimates ===
The table below lists weighted voting intention estimates. Refusals are generally excluded from the party vote percentages, while question wording and the treatment of "don't know" responses and those not intending to vote may vary between polling organisations. When available, seat projections determined by the polling organisations are displayed below (or in place of) the percentages in a smaller font; 38 seats were required for an absolute majority in the Parliament of Galicia.

Polling firm/Commissioner	Fieldwork date	Sample size	Turnout	PP	PSdG–PSOE	BNG	PSG–EG	CG	EU–UG	Lead
1993 regional election	17 Oct 1993	—N/a	64.2	52.1; 43	23.7; 19	18.4; 13	(Note: Within EU–UG.)	0.4; 0	3.0; 0	28.4
Demoscopia/El País	10 Oct 1993	2,500	66	51.9; 43	25.5; 19/21	15.4; 11		–	3.8; 0/2	26.4
ICP–Research/Diario 16	10 Oct 1993	?	61.9	47.0; 39/43	27.8; 22/24	13.3; 9/10		–	? 0/2	19.2
Sigma Dos/El Mundo	10 Oct 1993	?	?	? 39	? 24	? 11		–	? 1	?
Eco Consulting/Faro de Vigo	10 Oct 1993	?	?	? 40/42	? 20/22	? 11/12		–	? 2	?
Ecom 6/El Correo Gallego	10 Oct 1993	?	?	? 38/41	? 21/25	? 10/12		–	? 0/2	?
Gallup/La Voz de Galicia	10 Oct 1993	?	?	? 40/43	? 22	? 9		–	? 2/3	?
Sondaxe/La Voz de Galicia	3 Oct 1993	?	?	51.0; 40	24.1; 20/21	16.5; 12		–	? 1/2	26.9
PP	3 Oct 1993	1,800	?	? 38/42	? 22/24	? 10/12		–	? 0/1	?
ABC	17 Sep 1993	?	?	? 38	? 23	? 13		–	? 1	?
1993 general election	6 Jun 1993	—N/a	69.6	47.1 (38)	36.0 (29)	8.0 (6)		0.3 (0)	4.7 (2)	11.1
IMOP	18–29 May 1990	?	?	45.2	30.6	9.6	–	–	–	14.6
1989 regional election	17 Dec 1989	—N/a	59.5	44.0; 38	32.7; 28	8.0; 5	3.8; 2	3.6; 2	1.5; 0	11.3

=== Voting preferences ===
The table below lists raw, unweighted voting preferences.

Polling firm/Commissioner	Fieldwork date	Sample size	PP	PSdG–PSOE	BNG	PSG–EG	CG	EU–UG	Question	X mark	Lead
1993 regional election (Note: Does not include non-resident citizens.)	17 Oct 1993	—N/a	32.7	14.7	11.7		0.3	1.9	—N/a	34.2	18.0
CIS	24 Sep–5 Oct 1993	2,199	27.7	12.9	10.8		0.4	3.1	37.3	5.9	14.8
1993 general election	6 Jun 1993	—N/a	33.6	25.2	5.8		0.2	3.4	—N/a	28.7	8.4
CIS	7–19 Nov 1992	2,192	20.3	13.3	6.6	2.8	0.7	1.1	42.1	11.6	7.0
1989 regional election	17 Dec 1989	—N/a	25.8	19.0	4.7	2.2	2.1	0.9	—N/a	40.8	6.8

=== Victory preferences ===
The table below lists opinion polling on the victory preferences for each party in the event of a regional election taking place.

Polling firm/Commissioner	Fieldwork date	Sample size	PP	PSdG–PSOE	Other/ None	Question	Lead
CIS	24 Sep–5 Oct 1993	2,199	36.0	20.4	10.2	33.4	15.6

=== Victory likelihood ===
The table below lists opinion polling on the perceived likelihood of victory for each party in the event of a regional election taking place.

Polling firm/Commissioner	Fieldwork date	Sample size	PP	PSdG–PSOE	Other/ None	Question	Lead
CIS	24 Sep–5 Oct 1993	2,199	59.5	4.1	6.5	29.9	55.4

== Results ==
=== Overall ===
← Summary of the 17 October 1993 Parliament of Galicia election results →
Parties and alliances	Popular vote			Seats	
Parties and alliances	Votes	%	±pp	Total	+/−
People's Party (PP)	763,839	52.14	+8.12	43	+5
Socialists' Party of Galicia (PSdeG–PSOE)	346,831	23.68	−9.00	19	−9
Galician Nationalist Bloc (BNG)^{1}	269,233	18.38	+9.05	13	+8
United Left–Galician Unity (EU–UG)^{2}	44,902	3.07	−2.20	0	−2
Galician Coalition (CG)	6,098	0.42	−3.22	0	−2
Ruiz-Mateos Group–European Democratic Alliance (ARM–ADE)	5,293	0.36	−0.17	0	±0
The Greens of Galicia (Os Verdes)	4,682	0.32	+0.08	0	±0
Galician Alternative (AG)	3,187	0.22	New	0	±0
The Ecologists (LE)	2,987	0.20	−0.01	0	±0
Humanist Citizen Platform (PCH)	2,508	0.17	+0.11	0	±0
United People's Assembly (APU)	1,492	0.10	New	0	±0
Coalition for a New Socialist Party (NPS)^{3}	503	0.03	±0.00	0	±0
Blank ballots	13,355	0.91	+0.51		
Total	1,464,910			75	±0
Valid votes	1,464,910	99.52	+0.34		
Invalid votes	7,107	0.48	−0.34		
Votes cast / turnout	1,472,017	64.19	+4.69		
Abstentions	821,152	35.81	−4.69		
Registered voters	2,293,169				
Sources
Footnotes: ^{1} Galician Nationalist Bloc results are compared to the combined totals of Galician Nationalist Bloc and Galician Nationalist Party–Galicianist Party totals in the 1989 election.; ^{2} United Left–Galician Unity results are compared to the combined totals of Galician Socialist Party–Galician Left and United Left totals in the 1989 election.; ^{3} Coalition for a New Socialist Party results are compared to Alliance for the Republic totals in the 1989 election.

Popular vote
PP	52.14%
PSdeG–PSOE	23.68%
BNG	18.38%
EU–UG	3.07%
Others	1.83%
Blank ballots	0.91%

Seats
PP	57.33%
PSdeG–PSOE	25.33%
BNG	17.33%

=== Distribution by constituency ===
Constituency	PP		PSdeG		BNG	
Constituency	%	S	%	S	%	S
La Coruña	49.0	13	24.6	6	19.6	5
Lugo	56.5	9	23.1	4	16.5	2
Orense	54.5	9	25.4	4	17.0	2
Pontevedra	53.0	12	22.0	5	18.4	4
Total	52.1	43	23.7	19	18.4	13

== Aftermath ==
=== Government formation ===
Investiture; Nomination of Manuel Fraga (PP)
Ballot →	1 December 1993
Required majority →	38 out of 75
Yes: • PP (43)	43 / 75
No: • PSdeG (19); • BNG (13)	32 / 75
Abstentions	0 / 75
Absentees	0 / 75

== Bibliography ==
- Ley Orgánica 1/1981, de 6 de abril, de Estatuto de Autonomía para Galicia (Organic Law 1/1981). Official State Gazette (in Spanish). 6 April 1981 [version as of 28 April 1981]. BOE-A-1981-9564.
- Ley 1/1983, de 22 de febrero, reguladora de la Junta y su Presidente (Law 1/1983). Official State Gazette (in Spanish). 22 February 1983 [version as of 10 October 1989]. BOE-A-1983-23788.
- Ley Orgánica 5/1985, de 19 de junio, del Régimen Electoral General (Organic Law 5/1985). Official State Gazette (in Spanish). 19 June 1985 [version as of 3 November 1992]. BOE-A-1985-11672.
- Ley 8/1985, de 13 de agosto, de elecciones al Parlamento de Galicia (Law 8/1985). Official State Gazette (in Spanish). 13 August 1985 [version as of 4 January 1993]. BOE-A-1985-21380.
- Decreto 198/1993, de 23 de agosto, de disolución del Parlamento de Galicia y de convocatoria de elecciones (PDF) (Decree 198/1993). Official Journal of Galicia (in Spanish). 27 August 2001.
