= 1997 Galician regional election =

Election in the Spanish region of Galicia

- 19 October 1997

All 75 seats in the Parliament of Galicia 38 seats needed for a majority
- Opinion polls
- Registered: 2,565,369 ▲11.9%
- Turnout: 1,603,731 (62.5%) ▼1.7 pp
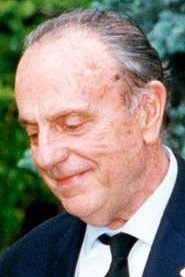

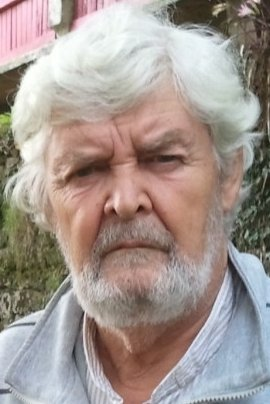

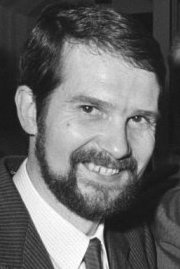
	First party	Second party	Third party
Leader	Manuel Fraga	Xosé Manuel Beiras	Abel Caballero
Party	PP	BNG	PSdeG–PSOE/ EU–EG/OV
Leader since	1989	1982	26 October 1996
Leader's seat	Lugo	La Coruña	Pontevedra
Last election	43 seats, 52.1%	13 seats, 18.4%	19 seats, 27.1% (Note: Results for PSdeG–PSOE (23.7%, 19 seats), EU–UG (3.1%, 0 seats) and Os Verdes (0.3%, 0 seats) in the 1993 election.)
Seats won	42	18	15
Seat change	▼1	▲5	▼4
Popular vote	832,751	395,435	310,508
Percentage	52.2%	24.8%	19.5%
Swing	▲0.1 pp	▲6.4 pp	▼7.6 pp
- Constituency results map for the Parliament of Galicia
President before election
Manuel Fraga
PP
President after election
Manuel Fraga
PP

A regional election was held in Galicia on 19 October 1997 to elect the 5th Parliament of the autonomous community. All 75 seats in the Parliament were up for election.

== Overview ==
Under the 1981 Statute of Autonomy, the Parliament of Galicia was the unicameral legislature of the homonymous autonomous community, having legislative power in devolved matters, as well as the ability to grant or withdraw confidence from a regional president. The electoral and procedural rules were supplemented by national law provisions.

=== Date ===
The term of the Parliament of Galicia expired four years after the date of its previous election, unless it was dissolved earlier. The election decree was required to be issued no later than 25 days before the scheduled expiration date of parliament and published on the following day in the Official Journal of Galicia (DOG), with election day taking place 54 days after the decree's publication. The previous election was held on 17 October 1993, which meant that the legislature's term would have expired on 17 October 1997. The election decree was required to be published in the DOG no later than 23 September 1997, setting the latest possible date for election day on 22 November 1997.

The regional president had the prerogative to dissolve the Parliament of Galicia at any given time and call a snap election, provided that it did not occur before one year after a previous one under this procedure. In the event of an investiture process failing to elect a regional president within a two-month period from the first ballot, the Parliament was to be automatically dissolved and a fresh election called.

The Parliament of Galicia was officially dissolved on 26 August 1997 with the publication of the corresponding decree in the DOG, setting election day for 19 October and scheduling for the chamber to reconvene on 18 November.

=== Electoral system ===
Voting for the Parliament was based on universal suffrage, comprising all Spanish nationals over 18 years of age, registered in Galicia and with full political rights, provided that they had not been deprived of the right to vote by a final sentence, nor were legally incapacitated.

The Parliament of Galicia had a minimum of 60 and a maximum of 80 seats, with electoral provisions fixing its size at 75. All were elected in four multi-member constituencies—corresponding to the provinces of A Coruña, Lugo, Ourense and Pontevedra, each of which was assigned an initial minimum of 10 seats and the remaining 35 distributed in proportion to population—using the D'Hondt method and closed-list proportional voting, with a five percent-threshold of valid votes (including blank ballots) in each constituency. The use of this electoral method resulted in a higher effective threshold depending on district magnitude and vote distribution.

As a result of the aforementioned allocation, each Parliament constituency was entitled the following seats:

Seats	Constituencies
24	La Coruña
22	Pontevedra^{(+1)}
15	Lugo
14	Orense^{(−1)}

The law did not provide for by-elections to fill vacant seats; instead, any vacancies arising after the proclamation of candidates and during the legislative term were filled by the next candidates on the party lists or, when required, by designated substitutes.

=== Outgoing parliament ===
The table below shows the composition of the parliamentary groups in the chamber at the time of dissolution.

Parliamentary composition in August 1997
Groups	Parties	Legislators	
Groups	Parties	Seats	Total
People's Parliamentary Group of Galicia	PP	43	43
Socialists of Galicia's Parliamentary Group	PSdeG–PSOE	19	19
Galician Nationalist Bloc's Parliamentary Group	BNG	13	13

== Parties and candidates ==
The electoral law allowed for parties and federations registered in the interior ministry, alliances and groupings of electors to present lists of candidates. Parties and federations intending to form an alliance were required to inform the relevant electoral commission within 10 days of the election call, whereas groupings of electors needed to secure the signature of at least one percent of the electorate in the constituencies for which they sought election, disallowing electors from signing for more than one list.

Below is a list of the main parties and alliances which contested the election:

Candidacy	Parties and alliances	Leading candidate	Ideology	Previous result		Gov.	Ref.
Candidacy	Parties and alliances	Leading candidate	Ideology	Vote %	Seats	Gov.	Ref.
PP	List: People's Party (PP)	Manuel Fraga	Conservatism; Christian democracy	52.1%	43	Yes	
PSdeG– PSOE/EU– EG/OV	List: Socialists' Party of Galicia (PSdeG–PSOE); United Left–Galician Left (EU–EG); The Greens of Galicia (OVG)	Abel Caballero	Social democracy	27.1%	19	No	
BNG	List: Galician Nationalist Bloc (BNG) – Galician People's Union (UPG) – Socialist Collective (CS) – Galician Nationalist Party–Galicianist Party (PNG–PG) – Nationalist Left (EN) – Inzar (Inzar) – Galician Unity (UG)	Xosé Manuel Beiras	Galician nationalism Left-wing nationalism Socialism	18.4%	13	No	

== Opinion polls ==
The tables below list opinion polling results in reverse chronological order, showing the most recent first and using the dates when the survey fieldwork was done, as opposed to the date of publication. Where the fieldwork dates are unknown, the date of publication is given instead. The highest percentage figure in each polling survey is displayed with its background shaded in the leading party's colour. If a tie ensues, this is applied to the figures with the highest percentages. The "Lead" column on the right shows the percentage-point difference between the parties with the highest percentages in a poll.

=== Voting intention estimates ===
The table below lists weighted voting intention estimates. Refusals are generally excluded from the party vote percentages, while question wording and the treatment of "don't know" responses and those not intending to vote may vary between polling organisations. When available, seat projections determined by the polling organisations are displayed below (or in place of) the percentages in a smaller font; 38 seats were required for an absolute majority in the Parliament of Galicia.

Color key:

Poll conducted after legal ban on opinion polls

Polling firm/Commissioner	Fieldwork date	Sample size	Turnout	PP	PSdeG–PSOE	BNG	IU	Lead
1997 regional election	19 Oct 1997	—N/a	62.5	52.2; 42	19.5; 15	24.8; 18	0.9; 0	27.4
PP	17 Oct 1997	?	?	? 42/43	? 14/15	? 18	–	?
Sigma Dos/El Mundo	6–9 Oct 1997	1,000	?	50.0– 52.0; 40/42	22.0– 24.0; 16/19	20.0– 22.0; 15/18	2.0– 3.0; 0	28.0
Demoscopia/El País	3–8 Oct 1997	2,500	63–64	51.5; 41/42	23.1; 16/18	22.8; 16/18	1.1; 0	28.4
PP	7 Oct 1997	?	?	52.3; 41/42	24.5; 17/19	20.5; 15/16	–	27.8
Opina/La Vanguardia	3–4 Oct 1997	1,000	65	50.7; 39/40	25.1; 21/22	21.5; 14/15	1.2; 0	25.6
PP	29 Sep 1997	?	?	? 40/41	? 18/19	? 16/17	–	?
Sondaxe/La Voz de Galicia	28 Sep 1997	?	?	? 39	? 19	? 17	–	?
DECO/PSOE	23–28 Sep 1997	2,265	?	46.1; 37/38	31.6; 23/25	19.3; 13/14	–	14.5
CIS	19–26 Sep 1997	2,196	69.3	51.5; 41/42	25.2; 19/20	20.5; 14	1.4; 0	26.3
Sondaxe/La Voz de Galicia	26 Jul 1997	2,904	?	50.0; 40	24.0; 20	19.0; 15	–	26.0
Infortécnica	20 Jun–8 Jul 1997	3,091	?	? 37/41	? 19/23	? 15/16	–	?
DECO/PSOE	10–20 Apr 1997	2,000	?	? 36/37	? 25/26	? 12/13	–	?
Obradoiro de Socioloxía/PP	1–4 Apr 1997	1,400	?	48.0; 40	20.0; 18	20.0; 17	–	28.0
Sondaxe/La Voz de Galicia	22 Nov 1996	3,200	?	? 37	? 23	? 15	–	?
1996 general election	3 Mar 1996	—N/a	71.4	48.3 (40)	33.5 (27)	12.9 (8)	3.6 (0)	14.8
1994 EP election	12 Jun 1994	—N/a	50.3	54.6 (47)	24.8 (19)	11.4 (7)	5.1 (2)	29.8
1993 regional election	17 Oct 1993	—N/a	64.2	52.1; 43	23.7; 19	18.4; 13	3.0; 0	28.4

=== Voting preferences ===
The table below lists raw, unweighted voting preferences.

Polling firm/Commissioner	Fieldwork date	Sample size	PP	PSdeG–PSOE	BNG	IU	Question	X mark	Lead
1997 regional election (Note: Does not include non-resident citizens.)	19 Oct 1997	—N/a	30.9	11.6	15.3	0.5	—N/a	33.7	15.6
CIS	19–26 Sep 1997	2,196	35.9	12.7	14.4	–	29.2	5.0	21.5
1996 general election	3 Mar 1996	—N/a	35.6	24.2	9.7	2.7	—N/a	26.2	11.4
1994 EP election	12 Jun 1994	—N/a	28.3	12.6	5.9	2.6	—N/a	48.2	15.7
1993 regional election	17 Oct 1993	—N/a	32.7	14.7	11.7	1.9	—N/a	34.2	18.0

=== Victory preferences ===
The table below lists opinion polling on the victory preferences for each party in the event of a regional election taking place.

Polling firm/Commissioner	Fieldwork date	Sample size	PP	PSdeG–PSOE	BNG	IU	Other/ None	Question	Lead
Opina/La Vanguardia	3–4 Oct 1997	1,000	36.9	16.0	13.8	0.6	4.4	28.3	20.9

=== Victory likelihood ===
The table below lists opinion polling on the perceived likelihood of victory for each party in the event of a regional election taking place.

Polling firm/Commissioner	Fieldwork date	Sample size	PP	PSdeG–PSOE	BNG	IU	Other/ None	Question	Lead
Opina/La Vanguardia	3–4 Oct 1997	1,000	77.6	2.9	1.0	0.0	0.3	18.2	74.7

=== Preferred President ===
The table below lists opinion polling on leader preferences to become president of the Regional Government of Galicia.

Polling firm/Commissioner	Fieldwork date	Sample size				Other/ None/ Not care	Question	Lead
Polling firm/Commissioner	Fieldwork date	Sample size	Fraga PP	Caballero PSdeG	Beiras BNG	Other/ None/ Not care	Question	Lead
Opina/La Vanguardia	3–4 Oct 1997	1,000	37.7	13.6	13.3	6.3	29.1	24.1

=== Predicted President ===
The table below lists opinion polling on the perceived likelihood for each leader to become president of the Regional Government of Galicia.

Polling firm/Commissioner	Fieldwork date	Sample size				Other/ None/ Not care	Question	Lead
Polling firm/Commissioner	Fieldwork date	Sample size	Fraga PP	Caballero PSdeG	Beiras BNG	Other/ None/ Not care	Question	Lead
Opina/La Vanguardia	3–4 Oct 1997	1,000	76.7	3.4	1.3	1.3	17.3	73.3

== Results ==
=== Overall ===
← Summary of the 19 October 1997 Parliament of Galicia election results →
Parties and alliances	Popular vote			Seats	
Parties and alliances	Votes	%	±pp	Total	+/−
People's Party (PP)	832,751	52.19	+0.05	42	−1
Galician Nationalist Bloc (BNG)	395,435	24.78	+6.40	18	+5
Socialists' Party–Galician Left–The Greens (PSdeG–PSOE/EU–EG/Os Verdes)^{1}	310,508	19.46	−7.61	15	−4
United Left (IU)	13,964	0.88	New	0	±0
Galician Democracy (DG)	11,538	0.72	New	0	±0
Galician People's Front (FPG)	3,395	0.21	New	0	±0
Humanist Party (PH)	2,543	0.16	−0.01	0	±0
Party of Self-employed and Professionals (AUTONOMO)	2,136	0.13	New	0	±0
Social Democratic Party of Law (SDD)	1,129	0.07	New	0	±0
The Move (Movida)	939	0.06	New	0	±0
Galician Phalanx of the CNSO (FG–JONS)	392	0.02	New	0	±0
Blank ballots	20,937	1.31	+0.40		
Total	1,595,667			75	±0
Valid votes	1,595,667	99.50	−0.02		
Invalid votes	8,064	0.50	+0.02		
Votes cast / turnout	1,603,731	62.51	−1.68		
Abstentions	961,638	37.49	+1.68		
Registered voters	2,565,369				
Sources
Footnotes: ^{1} Socialists' Party–Galician Left–The Greens results are compared to the combined totals of the Socialists' Party of Galicia, United Left–Galician Unity and The Greens of Galicia in the 1993 election.

Popular vote
PP	52.19%
BNG	24.78%
PSdeG/EG/OV	19.46%
Others	2.26%
Blank ballots	1.31%

Seats
PP	56.00%
BNG	24.00%
PSdeG/EG/OV	20.00%

=== Distribution by constituency ===
Constituency	PP		BNG		PSdeG	
Constituency	%	S	%	S	%	S
La Coruña	49.8	13	26.3	6	20.1	5
Lugo	57.7	9	19.8	3	18.9	3
Orense	56.7	8	21.3	3	19.6	3
Pontevedra	50.8	12	26.7	6	18.8	4
Total	52.2	42	24.8	18	19.5	15

== Aftermath ==
=== Government formation ===
Investiture; Nomination of Manuel Fraga (PP)
Ballot →	3 December 1997
Required majority →	38 out of 75
Yes: • PP (42)	42 / 75
No: • BNG (18); • PSdeG (13); • EU–EG (2)	33 / 75
Abstentions	0 / 75
Absentees	0 / 75

=== 2001 motion of no confidence ===
Motion of no confidence Nomination of Xosé Manuel Beiras (BNG)
Ballot →	29 January 2001
Required majority →	38 out of 75
Yes: • BNG (18)	18 / 75
No: • PP (41)	41 / 75
Abstentions: • PSdeG (13); • EU–EG (2)	15 / 75
Absentees: • PP (1)	1 / 75

== Bibliography ==
- Ley Orgánica 1/1981, de 6 de abril, de Estatuto de Autonomía para Galicia (Organic Law 1/1981). Official State Gazette (in Spanish). 6 April 1981 [version as of 5 August 1997]. BOE-A-1981-9564.
- Ley 1/1983, de 22 de febrero, reguladora de la Junta y su Presidente (Law 1/1983). Official State Gazette (in Spanish). 22 February 1983 [version as of 10 October 1989]. BOE-A-1983-23788.
- Ley Orgánica 5/1985, de 19 de junio, del Régimen Electoral General (Organic Law 5/1985). Official State Gazette (in Spanish). 19 June 1985 [version as of 31 May 1997]. BOE-A-1985-11672.
- Ley 8/1985, de 13 de agosto, de elecciones al Parlamento de Galicia (Law 8/1985). Official State Gazette (in Spanish). 13 August 1985 [version as of 4 January 1993]. BOE-A-1985-21380.
- Decreto 225/1997, de 25 de agosto, de disolución del Parlamento de Galicia y de convocatoria de elecciones (Decree 225/1997). Official Journal of Galicia (in Spanish). 25 August 1997.
