= Left of Galicia =

Left of Galicia Esquerda de Galicia
- Leader: Anxo Guerreiro
- Founded: 1997
- Dissolved: 2002
- Split from: United Left of Galicia
- Ideology: Socialism; Eurocommunism; Republicanism; Eco-socialism
- Political position: Left-wing

Website
- www.edeg.es/ (archived)

Left of Galicia (Galician: Esquerda de Galicia, EdeG) was a political party in Galicia, Spain, led by Anxo Guerreiro and active between 1997 and 2002.

== History ==
In 1997 a sector of United Left of Galicia, led by the General coordinator Anxo Guerreiro (supported from Madrid by the Democratic Party of the New Left), decided to form a coalition with the Socialists' Party of Galicia (PSdeG-PSOE) in the 1997 Galician elections, against the decisions of the national conference. Another sector was against that decision, and run with their own lists, and with the support of the federal United Left.

Left of Galicia won two seats (held by Miguel Anxo Guerreiro and Xosé Manuel Pazos). The results of the leftist coalition, however, were very disappointing. Altogether the coalition only obtained 15 seats (behind both the People's Party of Galicia and the Galician Nationalist Bloc). In the 1999 local elections the party run in various municipalities, gaining 10 local councillors.

In the 2001 Galician elections EdeG only gained 5,001 (0.33%) votes, losing both seats. The party was dissolved in 2002.

== See also ==
- United Left of Galicia
- Democratic Party of the New Left
