= Communist Party of Galicia (Revolutionary Marxist) =

Communist Party of Galicia (Revolutionary Marxist) Partido Comunista de Galicia (Marxista-Revolucionario)
- Secretary-General: Julio Pérez de la Fuente
- Founded: 1985
- Dissolved: 1991
- Split from: Communist Party of Galicia
- Merged into: PSdeG
- Headquarters: Avenida de Lugo, 231, Santiago de Compostela
- Ideology: Until 1989: Eurocommunism; Revolutionary Marxism; 1989-1991: Democratic socialism Postcommunism
- Political position: Left-wing
- National affiliation: Workers' Party of Spain – Communist Unity
- Town councillors (1987-1991): 8 / 4,033

Communist Party of Galicia (Revolutionary Marxist) (in Galician: Partido Comunista de Galicia (Marxista-Revolucionario), PCG-MR) was a communist political party in Galiza, founded by the followers of Santiago Carrillo after their expulsion from the Communist Party of Galicia (PCG) in October 1985.

== History ==
PCG-MR participated in the 1985 Galician elections, gaining 8,318 votes (0.66%) and failing to win any seat. In the municipal elections of 1987, PCG-MR had 8 town councillors elected. In the general elections of 1986, the party gained 12,072 votes and, again, no seats.

Following the bad result of the 1989 general elections, PCG-MR merged into the Spanish Socialist Workers' Party in 1991, and organized itself as an internal tendency called Left Unity (Unidade da Esquerda).

== Election results ==
Election	Votes	%	MPs or town councillors
Galician parliamentary election, 1985	8.318	0.66	-
Spanish general election, 1986	12,072	0.94	-
European Parliament election, 1987	13,091	1.06	-
Spanish municipal elections, 1987	10,113	0.75	8
Spanish general election, 1989	5,280	0.4	-
