= Converxencia XXI =

Convergence XXI Converxencia XXI
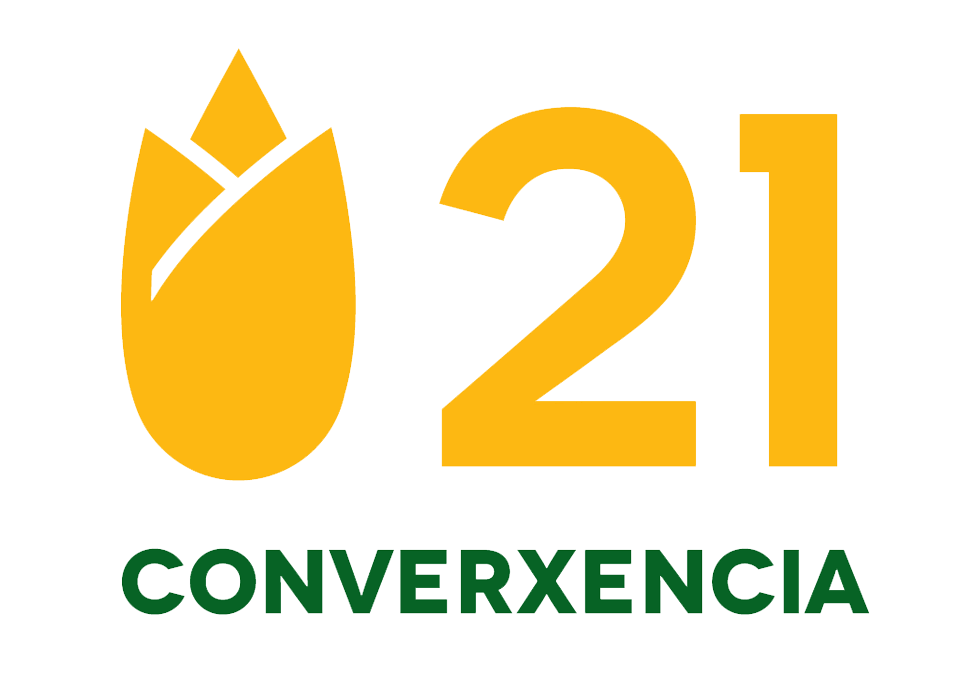
- Leader: Carlos Vázquez Padín
- Founded: 4 May 2009
- Dissolved: 5 April 2025
- Student wing: Asociación Liberal do Estudantado Galego
- Ideology: Liberalism; Galician nationalism Economic liberalism Pro-Europeanism
- Political position: Centre
- European affiliation: ALDE
- International affiliation: Liberal International

Website
- converxencia.eu

Convergence XXI (Galician: Converxencia XXI), sometimes styled as Convergence 21 (Galician: Converxencia 21), was a Galician political party. It describes itself as Galicianist, pro-European and liberal. The party was dissolved in April 2025.

== Views ==
Converxencia XXI tries to provide solutions from a centrist point of view, which could help define the real needs of Galician society, which was plunged into a severe economic and social crisis around the time of the party's formation.

These initiatives include the development of a robust internal infrastructure to support commercial activity and the strategic promotion of Galician provincial capitals. The measures aim to modernize administrative processes and reduce traditional regional dependencies or localized patronage systems.

Converxencia XXI emphasises multilingualism, European integration and cultural opening. The final goal is to provide social conditions that can develop the maximum potential of all individuals.

== History ==
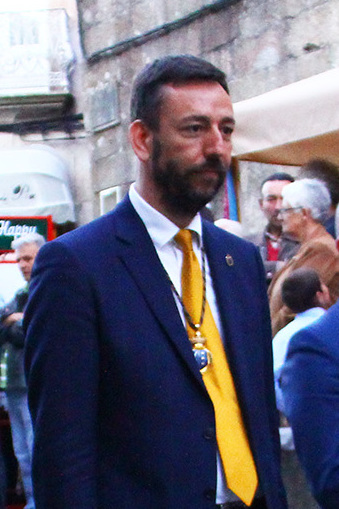
Carlos Vázquez Padín, president of Converxencia XXI.

Founded in May 2009 by its later elected First Secretary, Carlos Vázquez Padín, Converxencia XXI started contacts with other European organisations. The party entered into an early expansion stage, building up its militancy mostly via compromised citizens who share their ideological Liberal-Democrat and Reform basis.

The party achieved representation in the 2010 local elections, while concentrating on the largest Galician cities. For 2011 general elections, and for the first time in Spanish history, some parties were required to submit a minimum number of signatures to participate in elections. Converxencia XXI presented signatures and won the right to participate in all Galicia territory, having the best election result in its history and consolidating itself as the country's second Galician political force.

CXXI became the first centrist-Galicianist party to stand for all territories in a general election since 1991.

At the party's 7th National Congress on 5 April 2025, members of CXXI voted to dissolve the party. In a statement on the dissolution, party leader Carlos Vázquez Padín said, "there is no sense or dignity in begging for votes when you are not a desirable party for society", claiming, "society is not ready to take up liberalism". The party failed to gain representation in the Galician Parliament throughout its existence, while the conservative Spanish national People's Party again retained its majority following the 2024 Galician regional elections, having been in majority government in Galicia since 2009.

== Achievements ==
The party's earliest achievements involved the foundation of the first internationally homologated Galician Think Tank, known as GALIDEM, within the European Liberal Forum. GALIDEM emphasises social research, economic studies and the knowledge society from a Liberal point of view. GALIDEM hosted the 2012 Iberian Liberal Encounter. The current First Secretary is known for his articles in several media over the Internet. These have been summarized into a single book, first published in early 2011.
