= Galician Unity (1991) =

Defunct nationalist party in Spain

Galician Unity Unidade Galega
- Spokesperson: Camilo Nogueira
- Founded: 1991
- Dissolved: September 20, 2003
- Preceded by: PSG-EG
- Ideology: Federalism; Galician nationalism Democratic Socialism; Ecologism; Pacifism
- Political position: Left
- National affiliation: BNG (1994-2003)
- Trade union affiliation: Confederación Intersindical Galega (CIG)
- Local seats (1991-1995): 46 / 4,033

Galician Unity (Galician: Unidade Galega; UG) was a Galician nationalist and democratic socialist party formed by the Galician Socialist Party-Galician Left (PSG-EG) in 1991.

== History ==
UG was founded as the successor of the PSG-EG in 1991. Despite this the PSG-EG would not fully disappear until 1993. The party presented a coalition with United Left (EU) for the Galician elections of 1993 and for the Spanish elections of the same year, failing to gain any seats in both. In fact, UG, lost the 2 MPs that the PSG-EG had in the Parliament of Galicia between 1989 and 1993. UG got 74,605 votes (4.67%) in the general elections and 44,902 votes (3.07%) in the Galician ones.

After the election failure, UG joined the BNG in 1994. On the 20 of September 2003 UG decided to disappear as a political party and became an "opinion current" inside the BNG.
