= Ourense (Congress of Deputies constituency) =

Electoral constituency in Spain

Coordinates: 42°10′N 7°30′W

- Congress of Deputies; Electoral constituency
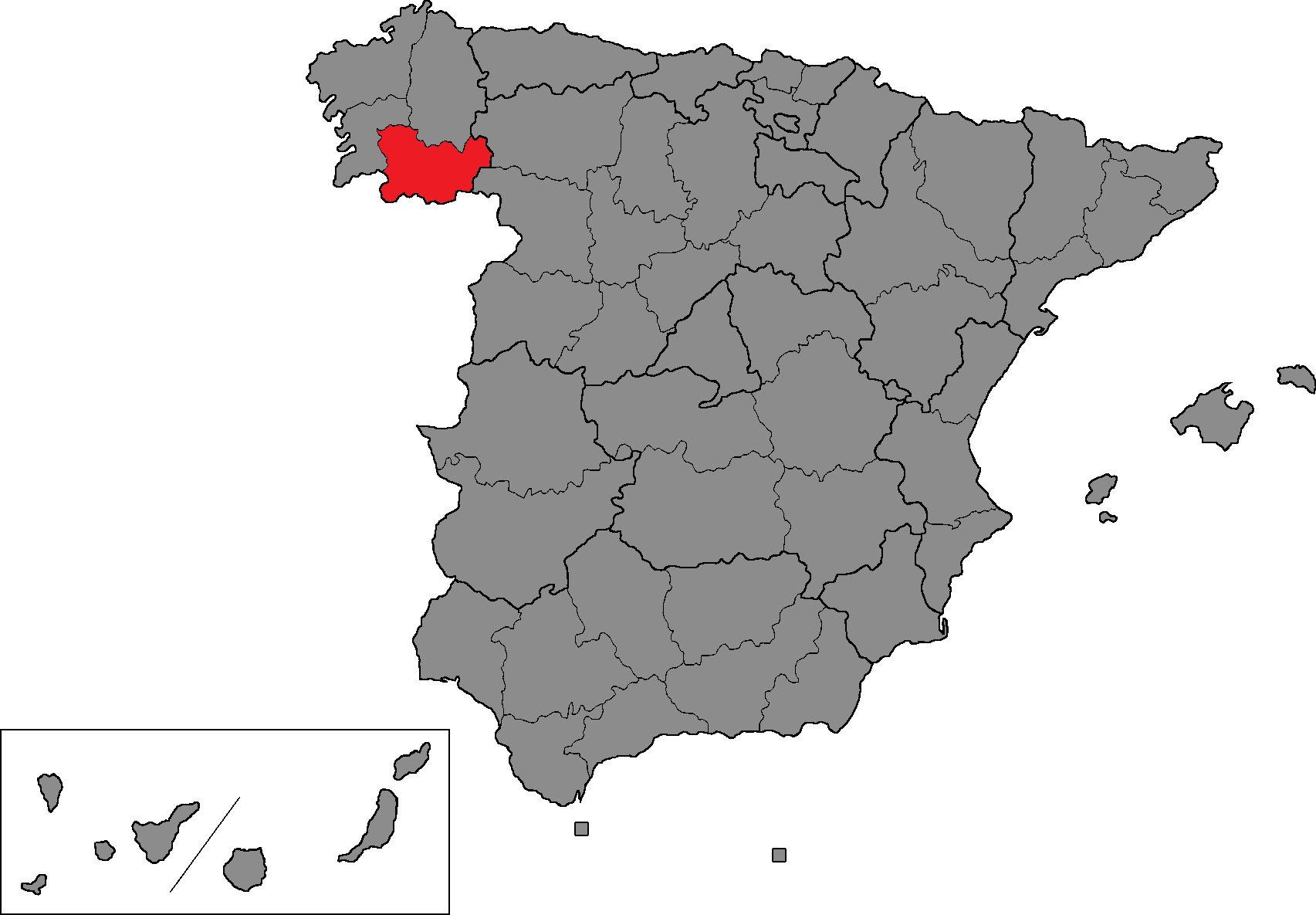
- Location of Ourense within Spain
- Province: Ourense
- Autonomous community: Galicia
- Population: ▲304,592 (2024)
- Electorate: ▼355,765 (2023)
- Major settlements: Ourense

Current constituency
- Created: 1977
- Seats: 5 (1977–1993); 4 (1993–present)
- Members: PP (3); PSOE (1)

Ourense (Spanish: Orense) is one of the 52 constituencies represented in the Congress of Deputies, the lower chamber of the Spanish parliament, the Cortes Generales. The constituency (whose boundaries correspond to those of the homonymous province) currently elects four deputies. The electoral system uses the D'Hondt method and closed-list proportional voting, with a minimum threshold of three percent.

== Electoral system ==
The constituency was created as per the Political Reform Law and was first contested in the 1977 general election. The Law provided for the provinces of Spain to be established as multi-member districts in the Congress of Deputies, with this regulation being maintained under the Spanish Constitution of 1978. Additionally, the Constitution requires for any modification of the provincial limits to be approved under an organic law, needing an absolute majority in the Cortes Generales.

Voting is based on universal suffrage, comprising all Spanish nationals over 18 years of age with full political rights, provided that they have not been deprived of the right to vote by a final sentence. The only exception was in 1977, when this was limited to nationals over 21 years of age and in full enjoyment of their political and civil rights. Amendments in 2011 required non-resident citizens to apply for voting, a system known as "begged" voting (Spanish: Voto rogado). which was abolished in 2022. Further, amendments in 2018 granted the right to vote to those legally incapacitated. The Congress of Deputies has a minimum of 300 and a maximum of 400 seats, with electoral provisions fixing its size at 350. Of these, 348 are elected in 50 multi-member constituencies corresponding to the provinces of Spain—each of which is assigned an initial minimum of two seats and the remaining 248 distributed in proportion to population—using the D'Hondt method and closed-list proportional voting, with a three percent-threshold of valid votes (including blank ballots) in each constituency. The remaining two seats are allocated to Ceuta and Melilla as single-member districts elected by plurality voting. The use of this electoral method may result in a higher effective threshold depending on district magnitude and vote distribution. The law does not provide for by-elections to fill vacant seats; instead, any vacancies arising after the proclamation of candidates and during the legislative term are filled by the next candidates on the party lists or, when required, by designated substitutes.

The electoral law allows for parties and federations registered in the interior ministry, alliances and groupings of electors to present lists of candidates. Parties and federations intending to form an alliance are required to inform the relevant electoral commission within 10 days of the election call—15 before 1985—whereas groupings of electors need to secure the signature of at least one percent of the electorate in the constituencies for which they seek election—one permille of the electorate, with a compulsory minimum of 500 signatures, until 1985—disallowing electors from signing for more than one list. Also since 2011, parties, federations or alliances that have not obtained a mandate in either chamber of the Cortes at the preceding election are required to secure the signature of at least 0.1 percent of electors in the aforementioned constituencies. Amendments in 2007 required a balanced composition of men and women in the electoral lists, so that candidates of either sex made up at least 40 percent of the total composition; further amendments in 2024 required the use of a zipper system.

== Deputies ==
Deputies 1977–present
Key to parties En Marea PSOE CG UCD PP CP CD AP
Legislature	Election	Distribution
Constituent	1977	4 / 1
1st	1979	1 / 3 / 1
2nd	1982	1 / 2 / 2
3rd	1986	2 / 1 / 2
4th	1989	2 / 3
5th	1993	2 / 2
6th	1996	2 / 2
7th	2000	1 / 3
8th	2004	1 / 3
9th	2008	2 / 2
10th	2011	1 / 3
11th	2015	1 / 1 / 2
12th	2016	1 / 3
13th	2019 (Apr)	2 / 2
14th	2019 (Nov)	2 / 2
15th	2023	1 / 3

== General elections ==
=== 2026 ===
Summary of the 29 November 2026 Congress of Deputies election results in Ourense
Parties and alliances	Popular vote			Seats	
Parties and alliances	Votes	%	±pp	Total	+/−
People's Party (PP)					
Socialists' Party of Galicia (PSdeG–PSOE)					
Galician Nationalist Bloc (BNG)					
Broad Front (Frente Amplio/Fronte Ampla)^{1}			n/a		
We Can (Podemos)^{1}			n/a		
Vox (Vox)					
Workers' Front (FO)					
For a Fairer World (M+J)					
Communist Party of the Workers of Galicia (PCTG)					
The Party is Over (SALF)			New		
Blank ballots					
Total				4	±0
Valid votes					
Invalid votes					
Votes cast / turnout					
Abstentions					
Registered voters	360,252				
Sources
Footnotes: ^{1} Within the Unite Galicia alliance in the 2023 election.

=== 2023 ===
Summary of the 23 July 2023 Congress of Deputies election results in Ourense
Parties and alliances	Popular vote			Seats	
Parties and alliances	Votes	%	±pp	Total	+/−
People's Party (PP)	93,182	50.02	+10.61	3	+1
Socialists' Party of Galicia (PSdeG–PSOE)	56,035	30.08	–3.12	1	–1
Galician Nationalist Bloc (BNG)	15,317	8.22	+2.24	0	±0
Unite Galicia (Sumar)^{1}	10,171	5.46	–2.46	0	±0
Vox (Vox)	9,080	4.87	–2.88	0	±0
Animalist Party with the Environment (PACMA)^{2}	700	0.38	–0.26	0	±0
Workers' Front (FO)	182	0.10	New	0	±0
Citizens of Democratic Centre (CCD)	153	0.08	New	0	±0
For a Fairer World (PUM+J)	144	0.08	–0.10	0	±0
Communist Party of the Workers of Galicia (PCTG)	101	0.05	–0.04	0	±0
Zero Cuts (Recortes Cero)	97	0.05	–0.08	0	±0
Blank ballots	1,109	0.60	–0.37		
Total	186,271			4	±0
Valid votes	186,271	99.05	+0.28		
Invalid votes	1,794	0.95	–0.28		
Votes cast / turnout	188,065	52.86	+4.68		
Abstentions	167,700	47.14	–4.68		
Registered voters	355,765				
Sources
Footnotes: ^{1} Unite Galicia results are compared to In Common–United We Can totals in the November 2019 election.; ^{2} Animalist Party with the Environment results are compared to Animalist Party Against Mistreatment of Animals totals in the November 2019 election.

=== November 2019 ===
Summary of the 10 November 2019 Congress of Deputies election results in Ourense
Parties and alliances	Popular vote			Seats	
Parties and alliances	Votes	%	±pp	Total	+/−
People's Party (PP)	67,580	39.41	+4.60	2	±0
Socialists' Party of Galicia (PSdeG–PSOE)	56,934	33.20	+0.32	2	±0
In Common–United We Can (Podemos–EU)	13,573	7.92	–1.02	0	±0
Vox (Vox)	13,285	7.75	+2.56	0	±0
Galician Nationalist Bloc (BNG)	10,256	5.98	+2.06	0	±0
Citizens–Party of the Citizenry (Cs)	6,397	3.73	–7.02	0	±0
Animalist Party Against Mistreatment of Animals (PACMA)	1,094	0.64	–0.18	0	±0
For a Fairer World (PUM+J)	307	0.18	+0.07	0	±0
Zero Cuts–Green Group (Recortes Cero–GV)	221	0.13	+0.03	0	±0
Communist Party of the Workers of Galicia (PCTG)	158	0.09	+0.02	0	±0
Blank ballots	1,666	0.97	+0.03		
Total	171,471			4	±0
Valid votes	171,471	98.77	±0.00		
Invalid votes	2,127	1.23	±0.00		
Votes cast / turnout	173,598	48.18	–5.78		
Abstentions	186,704	51.82	+5.78		
Registered voters	360,302				

=== April 2019 ===
Summary of the 28 April 2019 Congress of Deputies election results in Ourense
Parties and alliances	Popular vote			Seats	
Parties and alliances	Votes	%	±pp	Total	+/−
People's Party (PP)	67,020	34.81	–14.89	2	–1
Socialists' Party of Galicia (PSdeG–PSOE)	63,304	32.88	+9.55	2	+1
Citizens–Party of the Citizenry (Cs)	20,689	10.75	+3.70	0	±0
In Common–United We Can (Podemos–EU–Mareas en Común–Equo)^{1}	17,213	8.94	–6.71	0	±0
Vox (Vox)	9,984	5.19	New	0	±0
Galician Nationalist Bloc (BNG)	7,548	3.92	+1.71	0	±0
In Tide (En Marea)	2,220	1.15	New	0	±0
Animalist Party Against Mistreatment of Animals (PACMA)	1,576	0.82	–0.08	0	±0
Living Ourense (VOU)	335	0.17	New	0	±0
Commitment to Galicia (CxG)	272	0.14	New	0	±0
For a Fairer World (PUM+J)	213	0.11	New	0	±0
Zero Cuts–Green Group (Recortes Cero–GV)	202	0.10	–0.12	0	±0
Communist Party of the Workers of Galicia (PCTG)	143	0.07	New	0	±0
Blank ballots	1,804	0.94	+0.12		
Total	192,523			4	±0
Valid votes	192,523	98.77	+0.03		
Invalid votes	2,390	1.23	–0.03		
Votes cast / turnout	194,913	53.96	+2.22		
Abstentions	166,275	46.04	–2.22		
Registered voters	361,188				
Sources
Footnotes: ^{1} In Common–United We Can results are compared to Podemos–Anova–EU totals in the 2016 election.

=== 2016 ===
Summary of the 26 June 2016 Congress of Deputies election results in Ourense
Parties and alliances	Popular vote			Seats	
Parties and alliances	Votes	%	±pp	Total	+/−
People's Party (PP)	92,539	49.70	+4.78	3	+1
Socialists' Party of Galicia (PSdeG–PSOE)	43,429	23.33	+0.15	1	±0
In Tide (Podemos–Anova–EU)	29,136	15.65	–2.16	0	–1
Citizens–Party of the Citizenry (C's)	13,133	7.05	–0.81	0	±0
Galician Nationalist Bloc–We–Galician Candidacy (BNG–Nós)^{1}	4,107	2.21	–1.14	0	±0
Animalist Party Against Mistreatment of Animals (PACMA)	1,671	0.90	+0.17	0	±0
Zero Cuts–Green Group (Recortes Cero–GV)	417	0.22	+0.01	0	±0
Communists of Galicia (PCPE–CdG)	218	0.12	New	0	±0
Blank ballots	1,527	0.82	–0.09		
Total	186,177			4	±0
Valid votes	186,177	98.74	+0.04		
Invalid votes	2,385	1.26	–0.04		
Votes cast / turnout	188,562	51.74	–1.74		
Abstentions	175,907	48.26	+1.74		
Registered voters	364,469				
Sources
Footnotes: ^{1} Galician Nationalist Bloc–We–Galician Candidacy results are compared to We–Galician Candidacy totals in the 2015 election.

=== 2015 ===
Summary of the 20 December 2015 Congress of Deputies election results in Ourense
Parties and alliances	Popular vote			Seats	
Parties and alliances	Votes	%	±pp	Total	+/−
People's Party (PP)	86,673	44.92	–11.76	2	–1
Socialists' Party of Galicia (PSdeG–PSOE)	44,726	23.18	–4.89	1	±0
In Tide (Podemos–Anova–EU)^{1}	34,357	17.81	+14.93	1	+1
Citizens–Party of the Citizenry (C's)	15,174	7.86	New	0	±0
We–Galician Candidacy (Nós)^{2}	6,455	3.35	–5.98	0	±0
Animalist Party Against Mistreatment of Animals (PACMA)	1,406	0.73	+0.40	0	±0
For the Left (X Esq)	873	0.45	New	0	±0
Union, Progress and Democracy (UPyD)	777	0.40	–0.42	0	±0
Zero Cuts–Green Group (Recortes Cero–GV)	399	0.21	New	0	±0
Land Party (PT)	344	0.18	New	0	±0
Blank ballots	1,749	0.91	–0.49		
Total	192,933			4	±0
Valid votes	192,933	98.70	+0.08		
Invalid votes	2,542	1.30	–0.08		
Votes cast / turnout	195,475	53.48	–3.63		
Abstentions	170,038	46.52	+3.63		
Registered voters	365,513				
Sources
Footnotes: ^{1} In Tide results are compared to United Left–The Greens: Plural Left totals in the 2011 election.; ^{2} We–Galician Candidacy results are compared to Galician Nationalist Bloc totals in the 2011 election.

=== 2011 ===
Summary of the 20 November 2011 Congress of Deputies election results in Ourense
Parties and alliances	Popular vote			Seats	
Parties and alliances	Votes	%	±pp	Total	+/−
People's Party (PP)	115,796	56.68	+9.39	3	+1
Socialists' Party of Galicia (PSdeG–PSOE)	57,340	28.07	–10.91	1	–1
Galician Nationalist Bloc (BNG)	19,054	9.33	–1.51	0	±0
United Left–The Greens: Plural Left (EU–V)	4,757	2.33	+1.64	0	±0
Union, Progress and Democracy (UPyD)	1,677	0.82	+0.37	0	±0
Equo (Equo)	1,125	0.55	New	0	±0
Animalist Party Against Mistreatment of Animals (PACMA)	679	0.33	New	0	±0
For a Fairer World (PUM+J)	654	0.32	+0.09	0	±0
XXI Convergence (C.XXI)	191	0.09	New	0	±0
Communist Unification of Spain (UCE)	156	0.08	New	0	±0
Blank ballots	2,857	1.40	+0.66		
Total	204,286			4	±0
Valid votes	204,286	98.62	–0.70		
Invalid votes	2,854	1.38	+0.70		
Votes cast / turnout	207,140	57.11	–11.46		
Abstentions	155,539	42.89	+11.46		
Registered voters	362,679				

=== 2008 ===
Summary of the 9 March 2008 Congress of Deputies election results in Ourense
Parties and alliances	Popular vote			Seats	
Parties and alliances	Votes	%	±pp	Total	+/−
People's Party (PP)	114,433	47.29	–7.98	2	–1
Socialists' Party of Galicia (PSdeG–PSOE)	94,315	38.98	+7.88	2	+1
Galician Nationalist Bloc (BNG)	26,235	10.84	–0.06	0	±0
United Left–Alternative (EU–IU)	1,658	0.69	–0.17	0	±0
Union, Progress and Democracy (UPyD)	1,101	0.45	New	0	±0
For a Fairer World (PUM+J)	558	0.23	New	0	±0
The Greens of Europe (LVdE)	508	0.21	New	0	±0
Communist Party of the Galician People (PCPG)	319	0.13	New	0	±0
Social Democratic Party (PSD)	288	0.12	New	0	±0
Liberal Democratic Centre (CDL)	181	0.07	New	0	±0
Humanist Party (PH)	137	0.06	–0.03	0	±0
Spanish Phalanx of the CNSO (FE de las JONS)	126	0.05	+0.02	0	±0
Citizens–Party of the Citizenry (C's)	115	0.05	New	0	±0
Family and Life Party (PFyV)	104	0.04	New	0	±0
National Democracy (DN)	82	0.03	±0.00	0	±0
Spanish Alternative (AES)	43	0.02	New	0	±0
Blank ballots	1,783	0.74	–0.33		
Total	241,986			4	±0
Valid votes	241,986	99.32	–0.04		
Invalid votes	1,653	0.68	+0.04		
Votes cast / turnout	243,639	68.57	+0.54		
Abstentions	111,650	31.43	–0.54		
Registered voters	355,289				

=== 2004 ===
Summary of the 14 March 2004 Congress of Deputies election results in Ourense
Parties and alliances	Popular vote			Seats	
Parties and alliances	Votes	%	±pp	Total	+/−
People's Party (PP)	132,631	55.27	–1.92	3	±0
Socialists' Party of Galicia (PSdeG–PSOE)	74,636	31.10	+8.02	1	±0
Galician Nationalist Bloc (BNG)	26,153	10.90	–6.06	0	±0
United Left (EU–IU)	2,055	0.86	+0.14	0	±0
Galician Coalition (CG)	586	0.24	–0.08	0	±0
Democratic and Social Centre (CDS)	233	0.10	+0.02	0	±0
Party of Self-employed and Professionals (AUTONOMO)	231	0.10	–0.01	0	±0
Humanist Party (PH)	215	0.09	+0.01	0	±0
Galician People's Front (FPG)	195	0.08	±0.00	0	±0
Spanish Democratic Party (PADE)	91	0.04	New	0	±0
Republican Left–Galician Republican Left (IR–ERG)	87	0.04	New	0	±0
Spanish Phalanx of the CNSO (FE de las JONS)	83	0.03	New	0	±0
National Democracy (DN)	75	0.03	New	0	±0
The Phalanx (FE)	70	0.03	–0.04	0	±0
Republican Social Movement (MSR)	53	0.02	New	0	±0
Blank ballots	2,559	1.07	+0.16		
Total	239,953			4	±0
Valid votes	239,953	99.36	–0.04		
Invalid votes	1,545	0.64	+0.04		
Votes cast / turnout	241,498	68.03	+2.85		
Abstentions	113,510	31.97	–2.85		
Registered voters	355,008				

=== 2000 ===
Summary of the 12 March 2000 Congress of Deputies election results in Ourense
Parties and alliances	Popular vote			Seats	
Parties and alliances	Votes	%	±pp	Total	+/−
People's Party (PP)	128,535	57.19	+8.40	3	+1
Socialists' Party of Galicia–Progressives (PSdeG–PSOE–p)	51,864	23.08	–13.18	1	–1
Galician Nationalist Bloc (BNG)	38,106	16.96	+4.89	0	±0
United Left (EU–IU)	1,626	0.72	–0.98	0	±0
Galician Coalition (CG)	714	0.32	New	0	±0
Galician Democracy (DG)	688	0.31	New	0	±0
Party of Self-employed and Professionals (AUTONOMO)	256	0.11	New	0	±0
Spain 2000 Platform (ES2000)	230	0.10	New	0	±0
Galician People's Front (FPG)	184	0.08	±0.00	0	±0
Democratic and Social Centre–Centrist Union (CDS–UC)	180	0.08	–0.02	0	±0
Humanist Party (PH)	169	0.08	+0.03	0	±0
The Phalanx (FE)	149	0.07	New	0	±0
Blank ballots	2,037	0.91	+0.22		
Total	224,738			4	±0
Valid votes	224,738	99.40	+0.15		
Invalid votes	1,367	0.60	–0.15		
Votes cast / turnout	226,105	65.18	–5.68		
Abstentions	120,783	34.82	+5.68		
Registered voters	346,888				

=== 1996 ===
Summary of the 3 March 1996 Congress of Deputies election results in Orense
Parties and alliances	Popular vote			Seats	
Parties and alliances	Votes	%	±pp	Total	+/−
People's Party (PP)	112,326	48.79	–0.33	2	±0
Socialists' Party of Galicia (PSdeG–PSOE)	83,474	36.26	–2.97	2	±0
Galician Nationalist Bloc (BNG)	27,779	12.07	+5.71	0	±0
United Left–Galician Left (EU–EG)	3,915	1.70	–0.58	0	±0
The European Greens–The Greens of Galicia (VE–VG)	611	0.27	–0.03	0	±0
Centrist Union (UC)	231	0.10	–1.09	0	±0
Galician People's Front (FPG)	193	0.08	New	0	±0
Humanist Party (PH)	110	0.05	+0.01	0	±0
Blank ballots	1,583	0.69	+0.01		
Total	230,222			4	±0
Valid votes	230,222	99.15	–0.36		
Invalid votes	1,981	0.85	+0.36		
Votes cast / turnout	232,203	70.86	+4.59		
Abstentions	95,503	29.14	–4.59		
Registered voters	327,706				

=== 1993 ===
Summary of the 6 June 1993 Congress of Deputies election results in Orense
Parties and alliances	Popular vote			Seats	
Parties and alliances	Votes	%	±pp	Total	+/−
People's Party (PP)	106,471	49.12	+8.39	2	–1
Socialists' Party of Galicia (PSdeG–PSOE)	85,035	39.23	+3.87	2	±0
Galician Nationalist Bloc (BNG)	13,780	6.36	+3.75	0	±0
United Left–Galician Unity (EU–UG)	4,952	2.28	+0.32	0	±0
Democratic and Social Centre (CDS)	2,570	1.19	–4.38	0	±0
Ruiz-Mateos Group–European Democratic Alliance (ARM–ADE)	688	0.32	–0.11	0	±0
The Greens (Os Verdes)^{1}	653	0.30	–0.22	0	±0
The Ecologists (LE)	344	0.16	New	0	±0
Communist Party of the Galician People (PCPG)	244	0.11	+0.02	0	±0
Coalition for a New Socialist Party (CNPS)	146	0.07	New	0	±0
Galician Alternative (AG)	144	0.07	New	0	±0
Party of El Bierzo (PB)	123	0.06	New	0	±0
Humanist Party (PH)	80	0.04	–0.04	0	±0
Natural Law Party (PLN)	69	0.03	New	0	±0
Communist Unification of Spain (UCE)	0	0.00	New	0	±0
Blank ballots	1,472	0.68	±0.00		
Total	216,771			4	–1
Valid votes	216,771	99.51	+0.61		
Invalid votes	1,061	0.49	–0.61		
Votes cast / turnout	217,832	66.27	+10.62		
Abstentions	110,858	33.73	–10.62		
Registered voters	328,690				
Sources
Footnotes: ^{1} The Greens results are compared to The Greens–Green List totals in the 1989 election.

=== 1989 ===
Summary of the 29 October 1989 Congress of Deputies election results in Orense
Parties and alliances	Popular vote			Seats	
Parties and alliances	Votes	%	±pp	Total	+/−
People's Party–Centrists of Galicia (PP–CdeG)^{1}	76,707	40.73	+2.20	3	+1
Socialists' Party of Galicia (PSdeG–PSOE)	66,592	35.36	+1.56	2	±0
Galician Coalition (CG)	14,578	7.74	–6.06	0	–1
Democratic and Social Centre (CDS)	10,486	5.57	+0.07	0	±0
Galician Nationalist Bloc (BNG)	4,921	2.61	+1.01	0	±0
Galician Nationalist Party–Galicianist Party (PNG–PG)	3,764	2.00	New	0	±0
United Left (EU)	3,691	1.96	+0.91	0	±0
Galician Socialist Party–Galician Left (PSG–EG)	2,455	1.30	–0.25	0	±0
The Greens–Green List (LV–LV)	974	0.52	New	0	±0
Ruiz-Mateos Group (Ruiz-Mateos)	805	0.43	New	0	±0
Galician People's Front (FPG)	577	0.31	New	0	±0
Workers' Socialist Party (PST)	551	0.29	–0.19	0	±0
Workers' Party of Spain–Communist Unity (PTE–UC)^{2}	238	0.13	–0.26	0	±0
Communist Party of the Galician People (PCPG)	166	0.09	New	0	±0
Humanist Party (PH)	155	0.08	New	0	±0
Revolutionary Workers' Party of Spain (PORE)	136	0.07	New	0	±0
Spanish Phalanx of the CNSO (FE–JONS)	129	0.07	–0.07	0	±0
Asturianist Party (PAS)	115	0.06	New	0	±0
Blank ballots	1,276	0.68	+0.18		
Total	188,316			5	±0
Valid votes	188,316	98.90	+0.05		
Invalid votes	2,099	1.10	–0.05		
Votes cast / turnout	190,415	55.65	+4.85		
Abstentions	151,737	44.35	–4.85		
Registered voters	342,152				
Sources
Footnotes: ^{1} People's Party–Centrists of Galicia results are compared to People's Coalition totals in the 1986 election.; ^{2} Workers' Party of Spain–Communist Unity results are compared to Communists' Unity Board totals in the 1986 election.

=== 1986 ===
Summary of the 22 June 1986 Congress of Deputies election results in Orense
Parties and alliances	Popular vote			Seats	
Parties and alliances	Votes	%	±pp	Total	+/−
People's Coalition (AP–PDP–PL)^{1}	67,128	38.53	+2.93	2	±0
Socialists' Party of Galicia (PSdG–PSOE)	58,876	33.80	+5.56	2	+1
Galician Coalition (CG)	24,045	13.80	New	1	+1
Democratic and Social Centre (CDS)	9,584	5.50	+3.57	0	±0
Group of Independent Electors (ADEI)	3,857	2.21	New	0	±0
Galician Nationalist Bloc (BNG)	2,783	1.60	–0.68	0	±0
Galician Socialist Party–Galician Left (PSG–EG)^{2}	2,702	1.55	+1.20	0	±0
Galicianist and United Left Platform (PG–EU)^{3}	1,823	1.05	+0.19	0	±0
Workers' Socialist Party (PST)	841	0.48	–0.11	0	±0
Communists' Unity Board (MUC)	675	0.39	New	0	±0
Republican Popular Unity (UPR)^{4}	422	0.24	+0.13	0	±0
Communist Unification of Spain (UCE)	369	0.21	+0.02	0	±0
Spanish Phalanx of the CNSO (FE–JONS)	241	0.14	+0.05	0	±0
Union of the Democratic Centre (UCD)	n/a	n/a	–29.17	0	–2
Blank ballots	865	0.50	+0.14		
Total	174,211			5	±0
Valid votes	174,211	98.85	+0.11		
Invalid votes	2,021	1.15	–0.11		
Votes cast / turnout	176,232	50.80	–4.23		
Abstentions	170,652	49.20	+4.23		
Registered voters	346,884				
Sources
Footnotes: ^{1} People's Coalition results are compared to People's Alliance–People's Democratic Party totals in the 1982 election.; ^{2} Galician Socialist Party–Galician Left results are compared to Galician Left totals in the 1982 election.; ^{3} Galicianist and United Left Platform results are compared to Communist Party of Galicia totals in the 1982 election.; ^{4} Republican Popular Unity results are compared to Communist Party of Spain (Marxist–Leninist) totals in the 1982 election.

=== 1982 ===
Summary of the 28 October 1982 Congress of Deputies election results in Orense
Parties and alliances	Popular vote			Seats	
Parties and alliances	Votes	%	±pp	Total	+/−
People's Alliance–People's Democratic Party (AP–PDP)^{1}	63,801	35.60	+16.84	2	+1
Union of the Democratic Centre (UCD)	52,282	29.17	–23.32	2	–1
Socialists' Party of Galicia (PSdG–PSOE)	50,619	28.24	+12.00	1	±0
Galician Nationalist Bloc–Galician Socialist Party (B–PSG)^{2}	4,081	2.28	–5.56	0	±0
Democratic and Social Centre (CDS)	3,467	1.93	New	0	±0
Communist Party of Galicia (PCE–PCG)	1,534	0.86	–1.81	0	±0
Workers' Socialist Party (PST)	1,056	0.59	New	0	±0
Galician Left (EG)	632	0.35	New	0	±0
New Force (FN)^{3}	399	0.22	New	0	±0
Communist Unification of Spain (UCE)	339	0.19	New	0	±0
Communist Party of Spain (Marxist–Leninist) (PCE (m–l))	190	0.11	New	0	±0
Spanish Phalanx of the CNSO (FE–JONS)	169	0.09	New	0	±0
Communist Left (LCR–MC)^{4}	0	0.00	–0.75	0	±0
Blank ballots	652	0.36	+0.36		
Total	179,221			5	±0
Valid votes	179,221	98.74	–1.26		
Invalid votes	2,283	1.26	+1.26		
Votes cast / turnout	181,504	55.03	+13.67		
Abstentions	148,343	44.97	–13.67		
Registered voters	329,847				
Sources
Footnotes: ^{1} People's Alliance–People's Democratic Party results are compared to Democratic Coalition totals in the 1979 election.; ^{2} Galician Nationalist Bloc–Galician Socialist Party results are compared to the combined totals of the Galician National-Popular Bloc and Galician Unity in the 1979 election.; ^{3} New Force results are compared to National Union totals in the 1979 election.; ^{4} Communist Left results are compared to the combined totals of Communist Movement of Galicia–Organization of Communist Left and Revolutionary Communist League in the 1979 election.

=== 1979 ===
Summary of the 1 March 1979 Congress of Deputies election results in Orense
Parties and alliances	Popular vote			Seats	
Parties and alliances	Votes	%	±pp	Total	+/−
Union of the Democratic Centre (UCD)	75,271	52.49	–9.24	3	–1
Democratic Coalition (CD)^{1}	26,901	18.76	+5.41	1	±0
Spanish Socialist Workers' Party (PSOE)^{2}	23,292	16.24	+1.69	1	+1
Galician National-Popular Bloc (BNPG)	7,899	5.51	+4.01	0	±0
Communist Party of Spain (PCE)	3,829	2.67	+1.04	0	±0
Galician Unity (PG–POG–PSG)^{3}	3,348	2.33	+0.80	0	±0
Party of Labour of Spain (PTE)^{4}	741	0.52	–0.94	0	±0
Communist Movement of Galicia–Organization of Communist Left (MCG–OIC)	622	0.43	New	0	±0
Carlist Party (PC)	606	0.42	New	0	±0
Revolutionary Communist League (LCR)	465	0.32	New	0	±0
Workers' Revolutionary Organization (ORT)	417	0.29	New	0	±0
Blank ballots	0	0.00	–0.37		
Total	143,391			5	±0
Valid votes	143,391	100.00	+1.76		
Invalid votes	0	0.00	–1.76		
Votes cast / turnout	143,391	41.36	–10.69		
Abstentions	203,269	58.64	+10.69		
Registered voters	346,660				
Sources
Footnotes: ^{1} Democratic Coalition results are compared to People's Alliance totals in the 1977 election.; ^{2} Spanish Socialist Workers' Party results are compared to the combined totals of Spanish Socialist Workers' Party and People's Socialist Party–Socialist Unity in the 1977 election.; ^{3} Galician Unity results are compared to Galician Socialist Party totals in the 1977 election.; ^{4} Party of Labour of Spain results are compared to Democratic Left Front totals in the 1977 election.

=== 1977 ===
Summary of the 15 June 1977 Congress of Deputies election results in Orense
Parties and alliances	Popular vote			Seats	
Parties and alliances	Votes	%	±pp	Total	+/−
Union of the Democratic Centre (UCD)	99,440	61.73	n/a	4	n/a
People's Alliance (AP)	21,502	13.35	n/a	1	n/a
Spanish Socialist Workers' Party (PSOE)	21,079	13.09	n/a	0	n/a
Christian Democratic Team of the Spanish State (PGSD–PPG)	3,384	2.10	n/a	0	n/a
Spanish Social Reform (RSE)	2,884	1.79	n/a	0	n/a
Communist Party of Spain (PCE)	2,627	1.63	n/a	0	n/a
Galician Socialist Party (PSG)	2,458	1.53	n/a	0	n/a
Galician National-Popular Bloc (BNPG)	2,412	1.50	n/a	0	n/a
People's Socialist Party–Socialist Unity (PSP–US)	2,358	1.46	n/a	0	n/a
Democratic Left Front (FDI)	2,347	1.46	n/a	0	n/a
Blank ballots	590	0.37	n/a		
Total	161,081			5	n/a
Valid votes	161,081	98.24	n/a		
Invalid votes	2,880	1.76	n/a		
Votes cast / turnout	163,961	52.05	n/a		
Abstentions	151,072	47.95	n/a		
Registered voters	315,033				

== Bibliography ==
- Ley 1/1977, de 4 de enero, para la Reforma Política (Fundamental Law 1/1977). Official State Gazette (in Spanish). 4 January 1977. BOE-A-1977-165.
- Real Decreto-ley 20/1977, de 18 de marzo, sobre Normas Electorales (Royal Decree-Law 20/1977). Official State Gazette (in Spanish). 18 March 1977. BOE-A-1977-7445.
- Constitución Española (Constitution). Official State Gazette (in Spanish). 27 December 1978. BOE-A-1978-31229.
- Ley Orgánica 5/1985, de 19 de junio, del Régimen Electoral General (Organic Law 5/1985). Official State Gazette (in Spanish). 19 June 1985. BOE-A-1985-11672.
- Carreras de Odriozola, Albert; Tafunell Sambola, Xavier (2005) [1989]. Estadísticas históricas de España, siglos XIX-XX (PDF) (in Spanish). Vol. 1 (II ed.). Bilbao: Fundación BBVA. pp. 1072–1097. ISBN 84-96515-00-1. Archived from the original (PDF) on 24 September 2015.
