= Pontevedra (Congress of Deputies constituency) =

Electoral constituency in Spain

Coordinates: 42°30′N 8°30′W

- Congress of Deputies; Electoral constituency
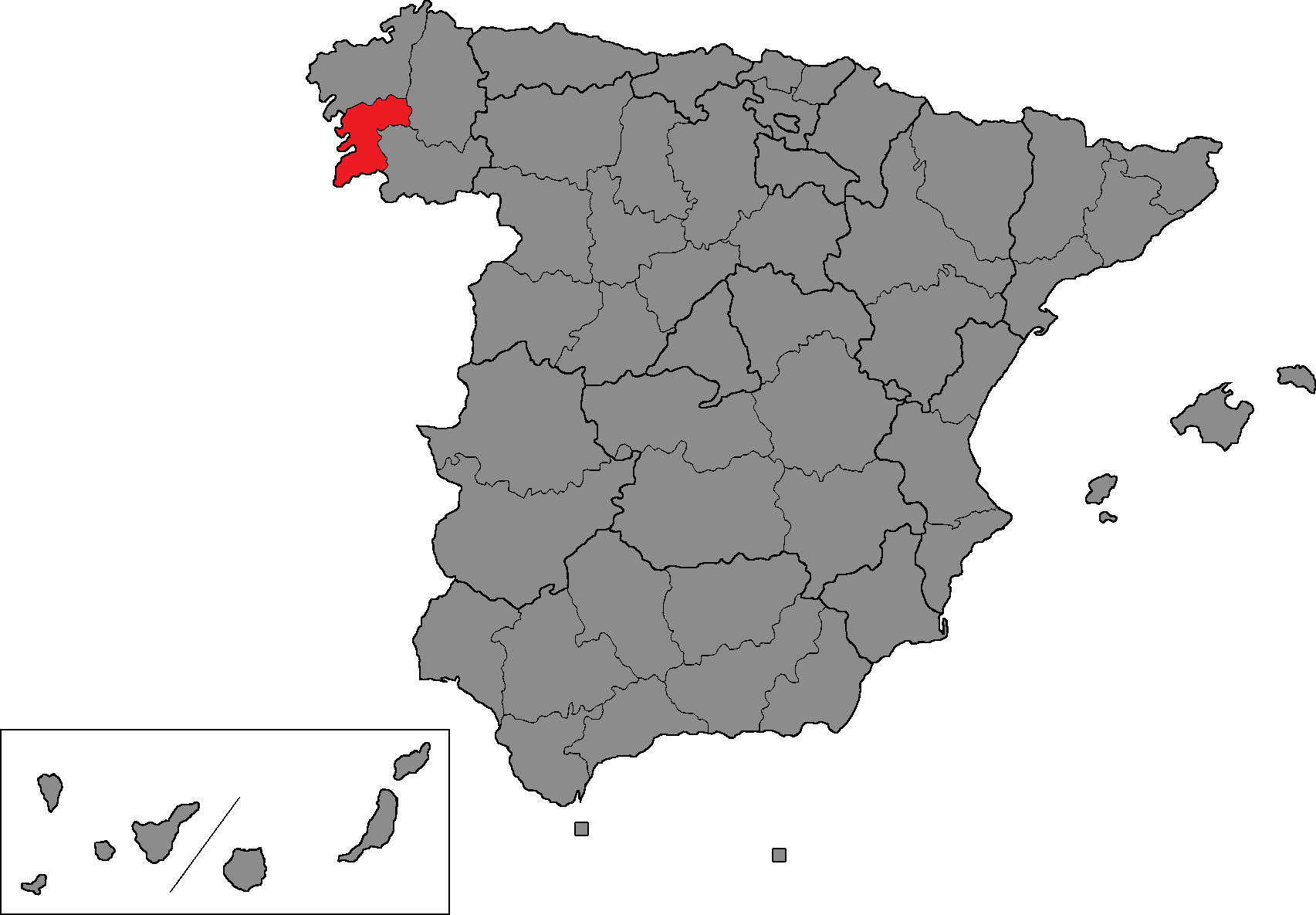
- Location of Pontevedra within Spain
- Province: Pontevedra
- Autonomous community: Galicia
- Population: ▲945,599 (2024)
- Electorate: ▲909,434 (2023)
- Major settlements: Vigo, Pontevedra

Current constituency
- Created: 1977
- Seats: 8 (1977–2004); 7 (2004–present)
- Members: PP (3); PSOE (3); Sumar (1)

Pontevedra is one of the 52 constituencies represented in the Congress of Deputies, the lower chamber of the Spanish parliament, the Cortes Generales. The constituency (whose boundaries correspond to those of the homonymous province) currently elects seven deputies. The electoral system uses the D'Hondt method and closed-list proportional voting, with a minimum threshold of three percent.

== Electoral system ==
The constituency was created as per the Political Reform Law and was first contested in the 1977 general election. The Law provided for the provinces of Spain to be established as multi-member districts in the Congress of Deputies, with this regulation being maintained under the Spanish Constitution of 1978. Additionally, the Constitution requires for any modification of the provincial limits to be approved under an organic law, needing an absolute majority in the Cortes Generales.

Voting is based on universal suffrage, comprising all Spanish nationals over 18 years of age with full political rights, provided that they have not been deprived of the right to vote by a final sentence. The only exception was in 1977, when this was limited to nationals over 21 years of age and in full enjoyment of their political and civil rights. Amendments in 2011 required non-resident citizens to apply for voting, a system known as "begged" voting (Spanish: Voto rogado). which was abolished in 2022. Further, amendments in 2018 granted the right to vote to those legally incapacitated. The Congress of Deputies has a minimum of 300 and a maximum of 400 seats, with electoral provisions fixing its size at 350. Of these, 348 are elected in 50 multi-member constituencies corresponding to the provinces of Spain—each of which is assigned an initial minimum of two seats and the remaining 248 distributed in proportion to population—using the D'Hondt method and closed-list proportional voting, with a three percent-threshold of valid votes (including blank ballots) in each constituency. The remaining two seats are allocated to Ceuta and Melilla as single-member districts elected by plurality voting. The use of this electoral method may result in a higher effective threshold depending on district magnitude and vote distribution. The law does not provide for by-elections to fill vacant seats; instead, any vacancies arising after the proclamation of candidates and during the legislative term are filled by the next candidates on the party lists or, when required, by designated substitutes.

The electoral law allows for parties and federations registered in the interior ministry, alliances and groupings of electors to present lists of candidates. Parties and federations intending to form an alliance are required to inform the relevant electoral commission within 10 days of the election call—15 before 1985—whereas groupings of electors need to secure the signature of at least one percent of the electorate in the constituencies for which they seek election—one permille of the electorate, with a compulsory minimum of 500 signatures, until 1985—disallowing electors from signing for more than one list. Also since 2011, parties, federations or alliances that have not obtained a mandate in either chamber of the Cortes at the preceding election are required to secure the signature of at least 0.1 percent of electors in the aforementioned constituencies. Amendments in 2007 required a balanced composition of men and women in the electoral lists, so that candidates of either sex made up at least 40 percent of the total composition; further amendments in 2024 required the use of a zipper system.

== Deputies ==
Deputies 1977–present
Key to parties BNG En Marea EC–UP Sumar PSOE CDS Cs UCD PP CP CD AP
| Legislature | Election | Distribution |
| Constituent | 1977 | 1 / 6 / 1 |
| 1st | 1979 | 2 / 5 / 1 |
| 2nd | 1982 | 3 / 1 / 4 |
| 3rd | 1986 | 3 / 1 / 4 |
| 4th | 1989 | 4 / 4 |
| 5th | 1993 | 3 / 5 |
| 6th | 1996 | 1 / 3 / 4 |
| 7th | 2000 | 1 / 2 / 5 |
| 8th | 2004 | 1 / 3 / 3 |
| 9th | 2008 | 1 / 3 / 3 |
| 10th | 2011 | 1 / 2 / 4 |
| 11th | 2015 | 2 / 2 / 3 |
| 12th | 2016 | 2 / 2 / 3 |
| 13th | 2019 (Apr) | 1 / 3 / 1 / 2 |
| 14th | 2019 (Nov) | 1 / 3 / 3 |
| 15th | 2023 | 1 / 3 / 3 |

== General elections ==
=== 2026 ===
Summary of the 29 November 2026 Congress of Deputies election results in Pontevedra
| Parties and alliances | Popular vote | | | Seats | |
| Parties and alliances | Votes | % | ±pp | Total | +/− |
|---|---|---|---|---|---|
| People's Party (PP) | | | | | |
| Socialists' Party of Galicia (PSdeG–PSOE) | | | | | |
| Broad Front (Frente Amplio/Fronte Ampla)^{1} | | | n/a | | |
| We Can (Podemos)^{1} | | | n/a | | |
| Galician Nationalist Bloc (BNG) | | | | | |
| Vox (Vox) | | | | | |
| Workers' Front (FO) | | | | | |
| Communist Party of the Workers of Galicia (PCTG) | | | | | |
| The Party is Over (SALF) | | | New | | |
| Blank Seats to Leave Empty Seats (EB) | | | New | | |
| Blank ballots | | | | | |
| Total | | | | 7 | ±0 |
| Valid votes | | | | | |
| Invalid votes | | | | | |
| Votes cast / turnout | | | | | |
| Abstentions | | | | | |
| Registered voters | 926,408 | | | | |
Sources
Footnotes: ^{1} Within the Unite alliance in the 2023 election.

=== 2023 ===
Summary of the 23 July 2023 Congress of Deputies election results in Pontevedra
| Parties and alliances | Popular vote | | | Seats | |
| Parties and alliances | Votes | % | ±pp | Total | +/− |
|---|---|---|---|---|---|
| People's Party (PP) | 227,658 | 39.72 | +10.66 | 3 | ±0 |
| Socialists' Party of Galicia (PSdeG–PSOE) | 179,737 | 31.36 | –0.45 | 3 | ±0 |
| Unite Galicia (Sumar)^{1} | 75,615 | 13.19 | –4.26 | 1 | ±0 |
| Galician Nationalist Bloc (BNG) | 53,828 | 9.39 | +1.91 | 0 | ±0 |
| Vox (Vox) | 27,539 | 4.81 | –2.48 | 0 | ±0 |
| Animalist Party with the Environment (PACMA)^{2} | 3,003 | 0.52 | –0.36 | 0 | ±0 |
| Workers' Front (FO) | 884 | 0.15 | New | 0 | ±0 |
| Zero Cuts (Recortes Cero) | 510 | 0.09 | –0.06 | 0 | ±0 |
| Communist Party of the Workers of Galicia (PCTG) | 485 | 0.08 | –0.01 | 0 | ±0 |
| Blank ballots | 3,865 | 0.67 | –0.31 | | |
| Total | 573,124 | | | 7 | ±0 |
| Valid votes | 573,124 | 98.96 | +0.30 | | |
| Invalid votes | 6,001 | 1.04 | –0.30 | | |
| Votes cast / turnout | 579,125 | 63.68 | +5.18 | | |
| Abstentions | 330,309 | 36.32 | –5.18 | | |
| Registered voters | 909,434 | | | | |
Sources
Footnotes: ^{1} Unite Galicia results are compared to the combined totals of In Common–United We Can and More Country–Equo in the November 2019 election.; ^{2} Animalist Party with the Environment results are compared to Animalist Party Against Mistreatment of Animals totals in the November 2019 election.

=== November 2019 ===
Summary of the 10 November 2019 Congress of Deputies election results in Pontevedra
| Parties and alliances | Popular vote | | | Seats | |
| Parties and alliances | Votes | % | ±pp | Total | +/− |
|---|---|---|---|---|---|
| Socialists' Party of Galicia (PSdeG–PSOE) | 166,377 | 31.81 | –0.43 | 3 | ±0 |
| People's Party (PP) | 151,961 | 29.06 | +4.02 | 3 | +1 |
| In Common–United We Can (Podemos–EU) | 81,041 | 15.50 | –1.95 | 1 | ±0 |
| Galician Nationalist Bloc (BNG) | 39,125 | 7.48 | +1.90 | 0 | ±0 |
| Vox (Vox) | 38,119 | 7.29 | +2.53 | 0 | ±0 |
| Citizens–Party of the Citizenry (Cs) | 23,984 | 4.59 | –6.49 | 0 | –1 |
| More Country–Equo (Más País–Equo) | 10,207 | 1.95 | New | 0 | ±0 |
| Animalist Party Against Mistreatment of Animals (PACMA) | 4,619 | 0.88 | –0.31 | 0 | ±0 |
| Zero Cuts–Green Group (Recortes Cero–GV) | 790 | 0.15 | –0.02 | 0 | ±0 |
| Blank Seats (EB) | 692 | 0.13 | –0.02 | 0 | ±0 |
| Communist Party of the Workers of Galicia (PCTG) | 493 | 0.09 | –0.01 | 0 | ±0 |
| For a Fairer World (PUM+J) | 447 | 0.09 | New | 0 | ±0 |
| Blank ballots | 5,142 | 0.98 | +0.07 | | |
| Total | 522,997 | | | 7 | ±0 |
| Valid votes | 522,997 | 98.66 | +0.13 | | |
| Invalid votes | 7,080 | 1.34 | –0.13 | | |
| Votes cast / turnout | 530,077 | 58.50 | –6.12 | | |
| Abstentions | 376,034 | 41.50 | +6.12 | | |
| Registered voters | 906,111 | | | | |

=== April 2019 ===
Summary of the 28 April 2019 Congress of Deputies election results in Pontevedra
| Parties and alliances | Popular vote | | | Seats | |
| Parties and alliances | Votes | % | ±pp | Total | +/− |
|---|---|---|---|---|---|
| Socialists' Party of Galicia (PSdeG–PSOE) | 185,785 | 32.24 | +10.43 | 3 | +1 |
| People's Party (PP) | 144,290 | 25.04 | –13.32 | 2 | –1 |
| In Common–United We Can (Podemos–EU–Mareas en Común–Equo)^{1} | 100,547 | 17.45 | –7.72 | 1 | –1 |
| Citizens–Party of the Citizenry (Cs) | 63,867 | 11.08 | +2.21 | 1 | +1 |
| Galician Nationalist Bloc (BNG) | 32,132 | 5.58 | +2.50 | 0 | ±0 |
| Vox (Vox) | 27,426 | 4.76 | New | 0 | ±0 |
| Animalist Party Against Mistreatment of Animals (PACMA) | 6,859 | 1.19 | ±0.00 | 0 | ±0 |
| In Tide (En Marea) | 6,705 | 1.16 | New | 0 | ±0 |
| Zero Cuts–Green Group (Recortes Cero–GV) | 1,007 | 0.17 | –0.08 | 0 | ±0 |
| Blank Seats (EB) | 886 | 0.15 | +0.01 | 0 | ±0 |
| Commitment to Galicia (CxG) | 825 | 0.14 | New | 0 | ±0 |
| Communist Party of the Workers of Galicia (PCTG) | 601 | 0.10 | New | 0 | ±0 |
| Blank ballots | 5,257 | 0.91 | +0.10 | | |
| Total | 576,187 | | | 7 | ±0 |
| Valid votes | 576,187 | 98.53 | –0.19 | | |
| Invalid votes | 8,609 | 1.47 | +0.19 | | |
| Votes cast / turnout | 584,796 | 64.62 | +3.40 | | |
| Abstentions | 320,245 | 35.38 | –3.40 | | |
| Registered voters | 905,041 | | | | |
Sources
Footnotes: ^{1} In Common–United We Can results are compared to Podemos–Anova–EU totals in the 2016 election.

=== 2016 ===
Summary of the 26 June 2016 Congress of Deputies election results in Pontevedra
| Parties and alliances | Popular vote | | | Seats | |
| Parties and alliances | Votes | % | ±pp | Total | +/− |
|---|---|---|---|---|---|
| People's Party (PP) | 208,921 | 38.36 | +3.87 | 3 | ±0 |
| In Tide (Podemos–Anova–EU) | 137,088 | 25.17 | –2.75 | 2 | ±0 |
| Socialists' Party of Galicia (PSdeG–PSOE) | 118,816 | 21.81 | +1.00 | 2 | ±0 |
| Citizens–Party of the Citizenry (C's) | 48,302 | 8.87 | –0.13 | 0 | ±0 |
| Galician Nationalist Bloc–We–Galician Candidacy (BNG–Nós)^{1} | 16,793 | 3.08 | –1.56 | 0 | ±0 |
| Animalist Party Against Mistreatment of Animals (PACMA) | 6,497 | 1.19 | +0.26 | 0 | ±0 |
| Zero Cuts–Green Group (Recortes Cero–GV) | 1,360 | 0.25 | ±0.00 | 0 | ±0 |
| Union, Progress and Democracy (UPyD) | 975 | 0.18 | –0.38 | 0 | ±0 |
| Blank Seats (EB) | 785 | 0.14 | New | 0 | ±0 |
| Communists of Galicia (PCPE–CdG) | 718 | 0.13 | –0.11 | 0 | ±0 |
| Blank ballots | 4,418 | 0.81 | –0.15 | | |
| Total | 544,673 | | | 7 | ±0 |
| Valid votes | 544,673 | 98.72 | +0.08 | | |
| Invalid votes | 7,089 | 1.28 | –0.08 | | |
| Votes cast / turnout | 551,762 | 61.22 | –3.04 | | |
| Abstentions | 349,471 | 38.78 | +3.04 | | |
| Registered voters | 901,233 | | | | |
Sources
Footnotes: ^{1} Galician Nationalist Bloc–We–Galician Candidacy results are compared to We–Galician Candidacy totals in the 2015 election.

=== 2015 ===
Summary of the 20 December 2015 Congress of Deputies election results in Pontevedra
| Parties and alliances | Popular vote | | | Seats | |
| Parties and alliances | Votes | % | ±pp | Total | +/− |
|---|---|---|---|---|---|
| People's Party (PP) | 197,201 | 34.49 | –16.35 | 3 | –1 |
| In Tide (Podemos–Anova–EU)^{1} | 159,638 | 27.92 | +22.56 | 2 | +2 |
| Socialists' Party of Galicia (PSdeG–PSOE) | 118,988 | 20.81 | –7.27 | 2 | ±0 |
| Citizens–Party of the Citizenry (C's) | 51,453 | 9.00 | New | 0 | ±0 |
| We–Galician Candidacy (Nós)^{2} | 26,537 | 4.64 | –7.39 | 0 | –1 |
| Animalist Party Against Mistreatment of Animals (PACMA) | 5,315 | 0.93 | +0.41 | 0 | ±0 |
| Union, Progress and Democracy (UPyD) | 3,177 | 0.56 | –0.78 | 0 | ±0 |
| Zero Cuts–Green Group (Recortes Cero–GV) | 1,439 | 0.25 | New | 0 | ±0 |
| Communists of Galicia (PCPE–CdG) | 1,377 | 0.24 | +0.01 | 0 | ±0 |
| Land Party (PT) | 1,158 | 0.20 | New | 0 | ±0 |
| Blank ballots | 5,481 | 0.96 | –0.48 | | |
| Total | 571,764 | | | 7 | ±0 |
| Valid votes | 571,764 | 98.64 | +0.35 | | |
| Invalid votes | 7,883 | 1.36 | –0.35 | | |
| Votes cast / turnout | 579,647 | 64.26 | +0.39 | | |
| Abstentions | 322,323 | 35.74 | –0.39 | | |
| Registered voters | 901,970 | | | | |
Sources
Footnotes: ^{1} In Tide results are compared to United Left–The Greens: Plural Left totals in the 2011 election.; ^{2} We–Galician Candidacy results are compared to Galician Nationalist Bloc totals in the 2011 election.

=== 2011 ===
Summary of the 20 November 2011 Congress of Deputies election results in Pontevedra
| Parties and alliances | Popular vote | | | Seats | |
| Parties and alliances | Votes | % | ±pp | Total | +/− |
|---|---|---|---|---|---|
| People's Party (PP) | 284,079 | 50.84 | +7.15 | 4 | +1 |
| Socialists' Party of Galicia (PSdeG–PSOE) | 156,880 | 28.08 | –12.45 | 2 | –1 |
| Galician Nationalist Bloc (BNG) | 67,227 | 12.03 | +0.52 | 1 | ±0 |
| United Left–The Greens: Plural Left (EU–V) | 25,834 | 4.62 | +3.05 | 0 | ±0 |
| Union, Progress and Democracy (UPyD) | 7,460 | 1.34 | +0.79 | 0 | ±0 |
| Equo (Equo) | 4,132 | 0.74 | New | 0 | ±0 |
| Animalist Party Against Mistreatment of Animals (PACMA) | 2,932 | 0.52 | +0.29 | 0 | ±0 |
| Communist Party of the Peoples of Spain (PCPE) | 809 | 0.14 | New | 0 | ±0 |
| XXI Convergence (C.XXI) | 518 | 0.09 | New | 0 | ±0 |
| Communist Unification of Spain (UCE) | 432 | 0.08 | New | 0 | ±0 |
| Internationalist Solidarity and Self-Management (SAIn) | 408 | 0.07 | New | 0 | ±0 |
| Blank ballots | 8,068 | 1.44 | +0.39 | | |
| Total | 558,779 | | | 7 | ±0 |
| Valid votes | 558,779 | 98.29 | –0.96 | | |
| Invalid votes | 9,706 | 1.71 | +0.96 | | |
| Votes cast / turnout | 568,485 | 63.87 | –7.41 | | |
| Abstentions | 321,569 | 36.13 | +7.41 | | |
| Registered voters | 890,054 | | | | |

=== 2008 ===
Summary of the 9 March 2008 Congress of Deputies election results in Pontevedra
| Parties and alliances | Popular vote | | | Seats | |
| Parties and alliances | Votes | % | ±pp | Total | +/− |
|---|---|---|---|---|---|
| People's Party (PP) | 268,446 | 43.69 | –2.30 | 3 | ±0 |
| Socialists' Party of Galicia (PSdeG–PSOE) | 249,086 | 40.53 | +3.00 | 3 | ±0 |
| Galician Nationalist Bloc (BNG) | 70,735 | 11.51 | –0.14 | 1 | ±0 |
| United Left–Alternative (EU–IU) | 9,623 | 1.57 | –0.60 | 0 | ±0 |
| Union, Progress and Democracy (UPyD) | 3,373 | 0.55 | New | 0 | ±0 |
| Anti-Bullfighting Party Against Mistreatment of Animals (PACMA) | 1,444 | 0.23 | New | 0 | ±0 |
| The Greens–Green Group (OV–GV) | 1,030 | 0.17 | New | 0 | ±0 |
| The Greens of Europe (LVdE) | 943 | 0.15 | New | 0 | ±0 |
| Social Democratic Party (PSD) | 865 | 0.14 | New | 0 | ±0 |
| For a Fairer World (PUM+J) | 575 | 0.09 | New | 0 | ±0 |
| Citizens–Party of the Citizenry (C's) | 396 | 0.06 | New | 0 | ±0 |
| Humanist Party (PH) | 386 | 0.06 | –0.12 | 0 | ±0 |
| Spanish Phalanx of the CNSO (FE de las JONS) | 380 | 0.06 | +0.01 | 0 | ±0 |
| Family and Life Party (PFyV) | 321 | 0.05 | New | 0 | ±0 |
| National Democracy (DN) | 213 | 0.03 | –0.03 | 0 | ±0 |
| Spanish Front (Frente) | 114 | 0.02 | New | 0 | ±0 |
| Spanish Alternative (AES) | 100 | 0.02 | New | 0 | ±0 |
| Blank ballots | 6,471 | 1.05 | –0.60 | | |
| Total | 614,501 | | | 7 | ±0 |
| Valid votes | 614,501 | 99.25 | –0.01 | | |
| Invalid votes | 4,617 | 0.75 | +0.01 | | |
| Votes cast / turnout | 619,118 | 71.28 | –0.85 | | |
| Abstentions | 249,442 | 28.72 | +0.85 | | |
| Registered voters | 868,560 | | | | |

=== 2004 ===
Summary of the 14 March 2004 Congress of Deputies election results in Pontevedra
| Parties and alliances | Popular vote | | | Seats | |
| Parties and alliances | Votes | % | ±pp | Total | +/− |
|---|---|---|---|---|---|
| People's Party (PP) | 279,454 | 45.99 | –7.43 | 3 | –2 |
| Socialists' Party of Galicia (PSdeG–PSOE) | 228,016 | 37.53 | +14.50 | 3 | +1 |
| Galician Nationalist Bloc (BNG) | 70,763 | 11.65 | –7.93 | 1 | ±0 |
| United Left (EU–IU) | 13,158 | 2.17 | +0.69 | 0 | ±0 |
| Humanist Party (PH) | 1,121 | 0.18 | +0.02 | 0 | ±0 |
| Galician People's Front (FPG) | 1,067 | 0.18 | –0.06 | 0 | ±0 |
| Democratic and Social Centre (CDS) | 991 | 0.16 | +0.04 | 0 | ±0 |
| Party of Self-employed and Professionals (AUTONOMO) | 911 | 0.15 | –0.03 | 0 | ±0 |
| Galician Coalition (CG) | 611 | 0.10 | ±0.00 | 0 | ±0 |
| Republican Left–Galician Republican Left (IR–ERG) | 378 | 0.06 | New | 0 | ±0 |
| National Democracy (DN) | 366 | 0.06 | New | 0 | ±0 |
| Spanish Phalanx of the CNSO (FE de las JONS)^{1} | 308 | 0.05 | –0.01 | 0 | ±0 |
| The Phalanx (FE) | 252 | 0.04 | –0.01 | 0 | ±0 |
| Republican Social Movement (MSR) | 211 | 0.03 | New | 0 | ±0 |
| Blank ballots | 10,009 | 1.65 | +0.26 | | |
| Total | 607,616 | | | 7 | –1 |
| Valid votes | 607,616 | 99.26 | –0.01 | | |
| Invalid votes | 4,521 | 0.74 | +0.01 | | |
| Votes cast / turnout | 612,137 | 72.13 | +6.81 | | |
| Abstentions | 236,570 | 27.87 | –6.81 | | |
| Registered voters | 848,707 | | | | |
Sources
Footnotes: ^{1} Spanish Phalanx of the CNSO results are compared to Independent Spanish Phalanx–Phalanx 2000 totals in the 2000 election.

=== 2000 ===
Summary of the 12 March 2000 Congress of Deputies election results in Pontevedra
| Parties and alliances | Popular vote | | | Seats | |
| Parties and alliances | Votes | % | ±pp | Total | +/− |
|---|---|---|---|---|---|
| People's Party (PP) | 284,955 | 53.42 | +6.31 | 5 | +1 |
| Socialists' Party of Galicia–Progressives (PSdeG–PSOE–p) | 122,834 | 23.03 | –9.45 | 2 | –1 |
| Galician Nationalist Bloc (BNG) | 104,453 | 19.58 | +4.99 | 1 | ±0 |
| United Left (EU–IU) | 7,883 | 1.48 | –2.58 | 0 | ±0 |
| Galician People's Front (FPG) | 1,301 | 0.24 | +0.10 | 0 | ±0 |
| Party of Self-employed and Professionals (AUTONOMO) | 952 | 0.18 | New | 0 | ±0 |
| Humanist Party (PH) | 839 | 0.16 | +0.05 | 0 | ±0 |
| Galician Democracy (DG) | 685 | 0.13 | New | 0 | ±0 |
| Centrist Union–Democratic and Social Centre (UC–CDS) | 634 | 0.12 | –0.01 | 0 | ±0 |
| Galician Coalition (CG) | 508 | 0.10 | New | 0 | ±0 |
| Independent Spanish Phalanx–Phalanx 2000 (FEI–FE 2000) | 329 | 0.06 | New | 0 | ±0 |
| The Phalanx (FE) | 247 | 0.05 | New | 0 | ±0 |
| Spanish Democratic Party (PADE) | 213 | 0.04 | New | 0 | ±0 |
| Spain 2000 Platform (ES2000) | 199 | 0.04 | New | 0 | ±0 |
| Blank ballots | 7,419 | 1.39 | +0.39 | | |
| Total | 533,458 | | | 8 | ±0 |
| Valid votes | 533,458 | 99.27 | –0.04 | | |
| Invalid votes | 3,913 | 0.73 | +0.04 | | |
| Votes cast / turnout | 537,371 | 65.32 | –6.73 | | |
| Abstentions | 285,316 | 34.68 | +6.73 | | |
| Registered voters | 822,687 | | | | |

=== 1996 ===
Summary of the 3 March 1996 Congress of Deputies election results in Pontevedra
| Parties and alliances | Popular vote | | | Seats | |
| Parties and alliances | Votes | % | ±pp | Total | +/− |
|---|---|---|---|---|---|
| People's Party (PP) | 259,634 | 47.11 | –0.08 | 4 | –1 |
| Socialists' Party of Galicia (PSdeG–PSOE) | 178,981 | 32.48 | –2.09 | 3 | ±0 |
| Galician Nationalist Bloc (BNG) | 80,408 | 14.59 | +5.95 | 1 | +1 |
| United Left–Galician Left (EU–EG) | 22,377 | 4.06 | –1.65 | 0 | ±0 |
| The European Greens–The Greens of Galicia (VE–VG) | 2,026 | 0.37 | +0.05 | 0 | ±0 |
| Galician People's Front (FPG) | 797 | 0.14 | New | 0 | ±0 |
| Centrist Union (UC) | 715 | 0.13 | –1.36 | 0 | ±0 |
| Humanist Party (PH) | 607 | 0.11 | +0.04 | 0 | ±0 |
| Blank ballots | 5,526 | 1.00 | +0.13 | | |
| Total | 551,071 | | | 8 | ±0 |
| Valid votes | 551,071 | 99.31 | –0.10 | | |
| Invalid votes | 3,856 | 0.69 | +0.10 | | |
| Votes cast / turnout | 554,927 | 72.05 | +1.07 | | |
| Abstentions | 215,312 | 27.95 | –1.07 | | |
| Registered voters | 770,239 | | | | |

=== 1993 ===
Summary of the 6 June 1993 Congress of Deputies election results in Pontevedra
| Parties and alliances | Popular vote | | | Seats | |
| Parties and alliances | Votes | % | ±pp | Total | +/− |
|---|---|---|---|---|---|
| People's Party (PP) | 239,286 | 47.19 | +8.23 | 5 | +1 |
| Socialists' Party of Galicia (PSdeG–PSOE) | 175,307 | 34.57 | +1.65 | 3 | –1 |
| Galician Nationalist Bloc (BNG) | 43,806 | 8.64 | +4.85 | 0 | ±0 |
| Galician Unity–United Left (UG–EU) | 28,948 | 5.71 | +2.02 | 0 | ±0 |
| Democratic and Social Centre (CDS) | 7,539 | 1.49 | –6.62 | 0 | ±0 |
| The Ecologists (LE) | 1,804 | 0.36 | –0.72 | 0 | ±0 |
| Ruiz-Mateos Group–European Democratic Alliance (ARM–ADE) | 1,759 | 0.35 | –1.07 | 0 | ±0 |
| The Greens (Os Verdes)^{1} | 1,600 | 0.32 | New | 0 | ±0 |
| Communist Party of the Galician People (PCPG) | 849 | 0.17 | –0.03 | 0 | ±0 |
| Galician Alternative (AG) | 642 | 0.13 | New | 0 | ±0 |
| Humanist Party (PH) | 338 | 0.07 | –0.09 | 0 | ±0 |
| Party of El Bierzo (PB) | 291 | 0.06 | New | 0 | ±0 |
| Coalition for a New Socialist Party (CNPS) | 285 | 0.06 | New | 0 | ±0 |
| Natural Law Party (PLN) | 279 | 0.06 | New | 0 | ±0 |
| Communist Unification of Spain (UCE) | 0 | 0.00 | New | 0 | ±0 |
| Blank ballots | 4,388 | 0.87 | –0.06 | | |
| Total | 507,121 | | | 8 | ±0 |
| Valid votes | 507,121 | 99.41 | +0.29 | | |
| Invalid votes | 2,999 | 0.59 | –0.29 | | |
| Votes cast / turnout | 510,120 | 70.98 | +8.53 | | |
| Abstentions | 208,546 | 29.02 | –8.53 | | |
| Registered voters | 718,666 | | | | |
Sources
Footnotes: ^{1} The Greens results are compared to The Greens–Green List totals in the 1989 election.

=== 1989 ===
Summary of the 29 October 1989 Congress of Deputies election results in Pontevedra
| Parties and alliances | Popular vote | | | Seats | |
| Parties and alliances | Votes | % | ±pp | Total | +/− |
|---|---|---|---|---|---|
| People's Party (PP)^{1} | 164,378 | 38.96 | –0.94 | 4 | ±0 |
| Socialists' Party of Galicia (PSdeG–PSOE) | 138,910 | 32.92 | –2.24 | 4 | +1 |
| Democratic and Social Centre (CDS) | 34,230 | 8.11 | –0.80 | 0 | –1 |
| Galician Nationalist Bloc (BNG) | 15,990 | 3.79 | +1.86 | 0 | ±0 |
| United Left (EU) | 15,558 | 3.69 | +2.52 | 0 | ±0 |
| Galician Socialist Party–Galician Left (PSG–EG) | 13,424 | 3.18 | –2.01 | 0 | ±0 |
| Galician Coalition (CG) | 12,030 | 2.85 | –1.40 | 0 | ±0 |
| Ruiz-Mateos Group (Ruiz-Mateos) | 5,983 | 1.42 | New | 0 | ±0 |
| The Ecologist Greens (LVE) | 4,541 | 1.08 | New | 0 | ±0 |
| Galician Nationalist Party–Galicianist Party (PNG–PG) | 3,885 | 0.92 | New | 0 | ±0 |
| Workers' Socialist Party (PST) | 2,662 | 0.63 | –0.23 | 0 | ±0 |
| Workers' Party of Spain–Communist Unity (PTE–UC)^{2} | 1,957 | 0.46 | –0.60 | 0 | ±0 |
| Galician People's Front (FPG) | 1,539 | 0.36 | New | 0 | ±0 |
| Communist Party of the Galician People (PCPG) | 845 | 0.20 | New | 0 | ±0 |
| Humanist Party (PH) | 696 | 0.16 | New | 0 | ±0 |
| Spanish Phalanx of the CNSO (FE–JONS) | 592 | 0.14 | –0.07 | 0 | ±0 |
| Revolutionary Workers' Party of Spain (PORE) | 523 | 0.12 | New | 0 | ±0 |
| Asturianist Party (PAS) | 300 | 0.07 | New | 0 | ±0 |
| Communist Party of Spain (Marxist–Leninist) (PCE (m–l))^{3} | 0 | 0.00 | –0.13 | 0 | ±0 |
| Blank ballots | 3,906 | 0.93 | +0.41 | | |
| Total | 421,949 | | | 8 | ±0 |
| Valid votes | 421,949 | 99.12 | +0.23 | | |
| Invalid votes | 3,758 | 0.88 | –0.23 | | |
| Votes cast / turnout | 425,707 | 62.45 | +2.43 | | |
| Abstentions | 255,918 | 37.55 | –2.43 | | |
| Registered voters | 681,625 | | | | |
Sources
Footnotes: ^{1} People's Party results are compared to People's Coalition totals in the 1986 election.; ^{2} Workers' Party of Spain–Communist Unity results are compared to Communists' Unity Board totals in the 1986 election.; ^{3} Communist Party of Spain (Marxist–Leninist) results are compared to Republican Popular Unity totals in the 1986 election.

=== 1986 ===
Summary of the 22 June 1986 Congress of Deputies election results in Pontevedra
| Parties and alliances | Popular vote | | | Seats | |
| Parties and alliances | Votes | % | ±pp | Total | +/− |
|---|---|---|---|---|---|
| People's Coalition (AP–PDP–PL)^{1} | 162,434 | 39.90 | +2.37 | 4 | ±0 |
| Socialists' Party of Galicia (PSdG–PSOE) | 143,118 | 35.16 | +4.70 | 3 | ±0 |
| Democratic and Social Centre (CDS) | 36,292 | 8.91 | +5.99 | 1 | +1 |
| Galician Socialist Party–Galician Left (PSG–EG)^{2} | 21,115 | 5.19 | +2.23 | 0 | ±0 |
| Galician Coalition (CG) | 17,321 | 4.25 | New | 0 | ±0 |
| Galician Nationalist Bloc (BNG) | 7,864 | 1.93 | –0.97 | 0 | ±0 |
| Galicianist and United Left Platform (PG–EU)^{3} | 4,754 | 1.17 | –0.78 | 0 | ±0 |
| Communists' Unity Board (MUC) | 4,296 | 1.06 | New | 0 | ±0 |
| Workers' Socialist Party (PST) | 3,492 | 0.86 | –0.22 | 0 | ±0 |
| Spanish Vertex Ecological Development Revindication (VERDE) | 1,420 | 0.35 | New | 0 | ±0 |
| Communist Unification of Spain (UCE) | 881 | 0.22 | +0.02 | 0 | ±0 |
| Spanish Phalanx of the CNSO (FE–JONS) | 864 | 0.21 | +0.03 | 0 | ±0 |
| Party of the Communists of Catalonia (PCC) | 582 | 0.14 | New | 0 | ±0 |
| Republican Popular Unity (UPR)^{4} | 523 | 0.13 | –0.04 | 0 | ±0 |
| Union of the Democratic Centre (UCD) | n/a | n/a | –18.48 | 0 | –1 |
| Blank ballots | 2,137 | 0.52 | +0.04 | | |
| Total | 407,093 | | | 8 | ±0 |
| Valid votes | 407,093 | 98.89 | +0.65 | | |
| Invalid votes | 4,570 | 1.11 | –0.65 | | |
| Votes cast / turnout | 411,663 | 60.02 | –8.06 | | |
| Abstentions | 274,238 | 39.98 | +8.06 | | |
| Registered voters | 685,901 | | | | |
Sources
Footnotes: ^{1} People's Coalition results are compared to People's Alliance–People's Democratic Party totals in the 1982 election.; ^{2} Galician Socialist Party–Galician Left results are compared to Galician Left totals in the 1982 election.; ^{3} Galicianist and United Left Platform results are compared to Communist Party of Galicia totals in the 1982 election.; ^{4} Republican Popular Unity results are compared to Communist Party of Spain (Marxist–Leninist) totals in the 1982 election.

=== 1982 ===
Summary of the 28 October 1982 Congress of Deputies election results in Pontevedra
| Parties and alliances | Popular vote | | | Seats | |
| Parties and alliances | Votes | % | ±pp | Total | +/− |
|---|---|---|---|---|---|
| People's Alliance–People's Democratic Party (AP–PDP)^{1} | 155,556 | 37.53 | +24.81 | 4 | +3 |
| Socialists' Party of Galicia (PSdG–PSOE) | 126,228 | 30.46 | +13.56 | 3 | +1 |
| Union of the Democratic Centre (UCD) | 76,575 | 18.48 | –28.83 | 1 | –4 |
| Galician Left (EG) | 12,262 | 2.96 | New | 0 | ±0 |
| Democratic and Social Centre (CDS) | 12,099 | 2.92 | New | 0 | ±0 |
| Galician Nationalist Bloc–Galician Socialist Party (B–PSG)^{2} | 12,002 | 2.90 | –10.52 | 0 | ±0 |
| Communist Party of Galicia (PCE–PCG) | 8,070 | 1.95 | –3.58 | 0 | ±0 |
| Workers' Socialist Party (PST) | 4,487 | 1.08 | New | 0 | ±0 |
| New Force (FN)^{3} | 930 | 0.22 | –0.72 | 0 | ±0 |
| Spanish Solidarity (SE) | 867 | 0.21 | New | 0 | ±0 |
| Communist Unification of Spain (UCE) | 827 | 0.20 | New | 0 | ±0 |
| Spanish Phalanx of the CNSO (FE–JONS) | 741 | 0.18 | New | 0 | ±0 |
| Communist Unity Candidacy (CUC) | 704 | 0.17 | New | 0 | ±0 |
| Communist Party of Spain (Marxist–Leninist) (PCE (m–l)) | 698 | 0.14 | New | 0 | ±0 |
| Communist Left (LCR–MC)^{4} | 425 | 0.10 | –0.86 | 0 | ±0 |
| Blank ballots | 1,997 | 0.48 | +0.18 | | |
| Total | 414,468 | | | 8 | ±0 |
| Valid votes | 414,468 | 98.24 | +0.12 | | |
| Invalid votes | 7,429 | 1.76 | –0.12 | | |
| Votes cast / turnout | 421,897 | 68.08 | +19.99 | | |
| Abstentions | 197,817 | 31.92 | –19.99 | | |
| Registered voters | 619,714 | | | | |
Sources
Footnotes: ^{1} People's Alliance–People's Democratic Party results are compared to Democratic Coalition totals in the 1979 election.; ^{2} Galician Nationalist Bloc–Galician Socialist Party results are compared to the combined totals of the Galician National-Popular Bloc and Galician Unity in the 1979 election.; ^{3} New Force results are compared to National Union totals in the 1979 election.; ^{4} Communist Left results are compared to the combined totals of Communist Movement of Galicia–Organization of Communist Left and Revolutionary Communist League in the 1979 election.

=== 1979 ===
Summary of the 1 March 1979 Congress of Deputies election results in Pontevedra
| Parties and alliances | Popular vote | | | Seats | |
| Parties and alliances | Votes | % | ±pp | Total | +/− |
|---|---|---|---|---|---|
| Union of the Democratic Centre (UCD) | 137,769 | 47.31 | –9.54 | 5 | –1 |
| Spanish Socialist Workers' Party (PSOE)^{1} | 49,213 | 16.90 | –3.72 | 2 | +1 |
| Democratic Coalition (CD)^{2} | 37,046 | 12.72 | +1.22 | 1 | ±0 |
| Galician Unity (PG–POG–PSG)^{3} | 21,160 | 7.27 | +5.55 | 0 | ±0 |
| Galician National-Popular Bloc (BNPG) | 17,909 | 6.15 | +3.73 | 0 | ±0 |
| Communist Party of Spain (PCE) | 16,111 | 5.53 | +2.14 | 0 | ±0 |
| National Union (UN) | 2,733 | 0.94 | New | 0 | ±0 |
| Party of Labour of Spain (PTE)^{4} | 2,637 | 0.91 | +0.40 | 0 | ±0 |
| Communist Movement of Galicia–Organization of Communist Left (MCG–OIC) | 1,693 | 0.58 | New | 0 | ±0 |
| Revolutionary Communist League (LCR)^{5} | 1,099 | 0.38 | +0.38 | 0 | ±0 |
| Workers' Revolutionary Organization (ORT)^{6} | 1,081 | 0.37 | +0.11 | 0 | ±0 |
| Republican Left (IR) | 970 | 0.33 | New | 0 | ±0 |
| Carlist Party (PC) | 877 | 0.30 | New | 0 | ±0 |
| Blank ballots | 884 | 0.30 | +0.04 | | |
| Total | 291,182 | | | 8 | ±0 |
| Valid votes | 291,182 | 98.12 | –0.15 | | |
| Invalid votes | 5,588 | 1.88 | +0.15 | | |
| Votes cast / turnout | 296,770 | 48.09 | –16.58 | | |
| Abstentions | 320,357 | 51.91 | +16.58 | | |
| Registered voters | 617,127 | | | | |
Sources
Footnotes: ^{1} Spanish Socialist Workers' Party results are compared to the combined totals of Spanish Socialist Workers' Party and People's Socialist Party–Socialist Unity in the 1977 election.; ^{2} Democratic Coalition results are compared to People's Alliance totals in the 1977 election.; ^{3} Galician Unity results are compared to Galician Socialist Party totals in the 1977 election.; ^{4} Party of Labour of Spain results are compared to Democratic Left Front totals in the 1977 election.; ^{5} Revolutionary Communist League results are compared to Front for Workers' Unity totals in the 1977 election.; ^{6} Workers' Revolutionary Organization results are compared to Workers' Electoral Group totals in the 1977 election.

=== 1977 ===
Summary of the 15 June 1977 Congress of Deputies election results in Pontevedra
| Parties and alliances | Popular vote | | | Seats | |
| Parties and alliances | Votes | % | ±pp | Total | +/− |
|---|---|---|---|---|---|
| Union of the Democratic Centre (UCD) | 198,231 | 56.85 | n/a | 6 | n/a |
| Spanish Socialist Workers' Party (PSOE) | 54,642 | 15.67 | n/a | 1 | n/a |
| People's Alliance (AP) | 40,104 | 11.50 | n/a | 1 | n/a |
| People's Socialist Party–Socialist Unity (PSP–US) | 17,265 | 4.95 | n/a | 0 | n/a |
| Communist Party of Spain (PCE) | 11,835 | 3.39 | n/a | 0 | n/a |
| Galician National-Popular Bloc (BNPG) | 8,423 | 2.42 | n/a | 0 | n/a |
| Christian Democratic Team of the Spanish State (PGSD–PPG) | 6,956 | 1.99 | n/a | 0 | n/a |
| Galician Socialist Party (PSG) | 5,999 | 1.72 | n/a | 0 | n/a |
| Democratic Left Front (FDI) | 1,777 | 0.51 | n/a | 0 | n/a |
| Spanish Social Reform (RSE) | 1,689 | 0.48 | n/a | 0 | n/a |
| Workers' Electoral Group (AET) | 891 | 0.26 | n/a | 0 | n/a |
| Front for Workers' Unity (FUT) | 0 | 0.00 | n/a | 0 | n/a |
| Blank ballots | 898 | 0.26 | n/a | | |
| Total | 348,710 | | | 8 | n/a |
| Valid votes | 348,710 | 98.27 | n/a | | |
| Invalid votes | 6,154 | 1.73 | n/a | | |
| Votes cast / turnout | 354,864 | 64.67 | n/a | | |
| Abstentions | 193,847 | 35.33 | n/a | | |
| Registered voters | 548,711 | | | | |

== Bibliography ==
- Ley 1/1977, de 4 de enero, para la Reforma Política (Fundamental Law 1/1977). Official State Gazette (in Spanish). 4 January 1977. BOE-A-1977-165.
- Real Decreto-ley 20/1977, de 18 de marzo, sobre Normas Electorales (Royal Decree-Law 20/1977). Official State Gazette (in Spanish). 18 March 1977. BOE-A-1977-7445.
- Constitución Española (Constitution). Official State Gazette (in Spanish). 27 December 1978. BOE-A-1978-31229.
- Ley Orgánica 5/1985, de 19 de junio, del Régimen Electoral General (Organic Law 5/1985). Official State Gazette (in Spanish). 19 June 1985. BOE-A-1985-11672.
- Carreras de Odriozola, Albert; Tafunell Sambola, Xavier (2005) [1989]. Estadísticas históricas de España, siglos XIX-XX (PDF) (in Spanish). Vol. 1 (II ed.). Bilbao: Fundación BBVA. pp. 1072–1097. ISBN 84-96515-00-1. Archived from the original (PDF) on 24 September 2015.
