= A Coruña (Congress of Deputies constituency) =

Electoral constituency in Spain

Coordinates: 43°22′N 8°24′W

- Congress of Deputies; Electoral constituency
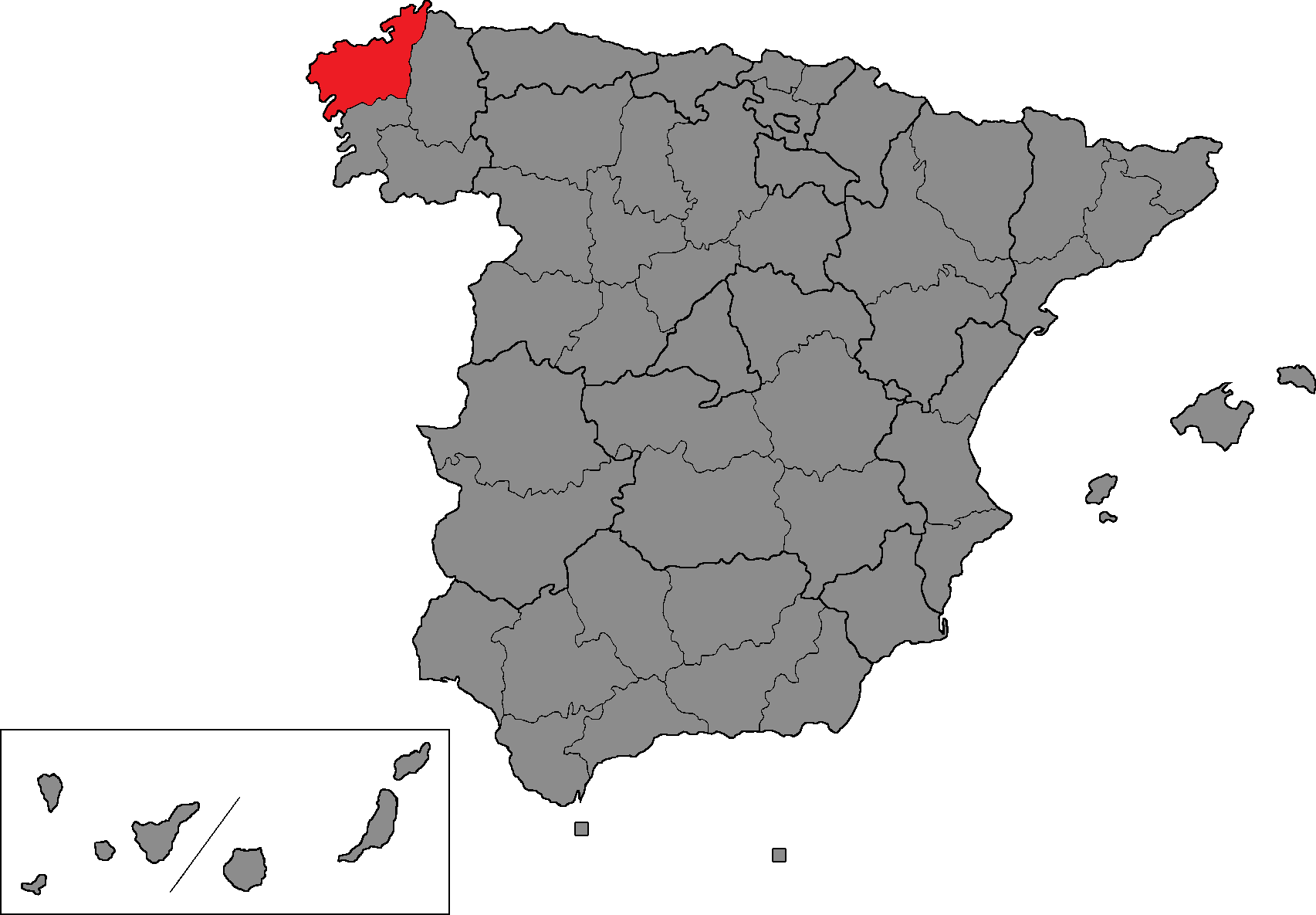
- Location of A Coruña within Spain
- Province: A Coruña
- Autonomous community: Galicia
- Population: ▲1,128,320 (2024)
- Electorate: ▼1,085,673 (2023)
- Major settlements: A Coruña, Santiago de Compostela, Ferrol

Current constituency
- Created: 1977
- Seats: 9 (1977–2008); 8 (2008–present)
- Members: PP (4); PSOE (2); Sumar (1); BNG (1)

A Coruña (Spanish: La Coruña, English: Corunna) is one of the 52 constituencies represented in the Congress of Deputies, the lower chamber of the Spanish parliament, the Cortes Generales. The constituency (whose boundaries correspond to those of the homonymous province) currently elects 8 deputies. The electoral system uses the D'Hondt method and closed-list proportional voting, with a minimum threshold of three percent.

== Electoral system ==
The constituency was created as per the Political Reform Law and was first contested in the 1977 general election. The Law provided for the provinces of Spain to be established as multi-member districts in the Congress of Deputies, with this regulation being maintained under the Spanish Constitution of 1978. Additionally, the Constitution requires for any modification of the provincial limits to be approved under an organic law, needing an absolute majority in the Cortes Generales.

Voting is based on universal suffrage, comprising all Spanish nationals over 18 years of age with full political rights, provided that they have not been deprived of the right to vote by a final sentence. The only exception was in 1977, when this was limited to nationals over 21 years of age and in full enjoyment of their political and civil rights. Amendments in 2011 required non-resident citizens to apply for voting, a system known as "begged" voting (Spanish: Voto rogado). which was abolished in 2022. Further, amendments in 2018 granted the right to vote to those legally incapacitated. The Congress of Deputies has a minimum of 300 and a maximum of 400 seats, with electoral provisions fixing its size at 350. Of these, 348 are elected in 50 multi-member constituencies corresponding to the provinces of Spain—each of which is assigned an initial minimum of two seats and the remaining 248 distributed in proportion to population—using the D'Hondt method and closed-list proportional voting, with a three percent-threshold of valid votes (including blank ballots) in each constituency. The remaining two seats are allocated to Ceuta and Melilla as single-member districts elected by plurality voting. The use of this electoral method may result in a higher effective threshold depending on district magnitude and vote distribution. The law does not provide for by-elections to fill vacant seats; instead, any vacancies arising after the proclamation of candidates and during the legislative term are filled by the next candidates on the party lists or, when required, by designated substitutes.

The electoral law allows for parties and federations registered in the interior ministry, alliances and groupings of electors to present lists of candidates. Parties and federations intending to form an alliance are required to inform the relevant electoral commission within 10 days of the election call—15 before 1985—whereas groupings of electors need to secure the signature of at least one percent of the electorate in the constituencies for which they seek election—one permille of the electorate, with a compulsory minimum of 500 signatures, until 1985—disallowing electors from signing for more than one list. Also since 2011, parties, federations or alliances that have not obtained a mandate in either chamber of the Cortes at the preceding election are required to secure the signature of at least 0.1 percent of electors in the aforementioned constituencies. Amendments in 2007 required a balanced composition of men and women in the electoral lists, so that candidates of either sex made up at least 40 percent of the total composition; further amendments in 2024 required the use of a zipper system.

== Deputies ==
Deputies 1977–present
Key to parties BNG En Marea EC–UP Sumar PSOE CDS Cs UCD PP CP CD AP
Legislature	Election	Distribution
Constituent	1977	2 / 6 / 1
1st	1979	2 / 6 / 1
2nd	1982	4 / 1 / 4
3rd	1986	4 / 1 / 4
4th	1989	4 / 1 / 4
5th	1993	4 / 5
6th	1996	1 / 3 / 5
7th	2000	2 / 2 / 5
8th	2004	1 / 4 / 4
9th	2008	1 / 3 / 4
10th	2011	1 / 2 / 5
11th	2015	2 / 2 / 1 / 3
12th	2016	2 / 2 / 4
13th	2019 (Apr)	1 / 3 / 1 / 3
14th	2019 (Nov)	1 / 1 / 3 / 3
15th	2023	1 / 1 / 2 / 4

== General elections ==
=== 2026 ===
Summary of the 29 November 2026 Congress of Deputies election results in A Coruña
Parties and alliances	Popular vote			Seats	
Parties and alliances	Votes	%	±pp	Total	+/−
People's Party (PP)					
Socialists' Party of Galicia (PSdeG–PSOE)					
Broad Front (Frente Amplio/Fronte Ampla)^{1}			n/a		
We Can (Podemos)^{1}			n/a		
Galician Nationalist Bloc (BNG)					
Vox (Vox)					
Workers' Front (FO)					
The Party is Over (SALF)			New		
Communist Party of the Workers of Galicia (PCTG)			New		
Blank ballots					
Total				8	±0
Valid votes					
Invalid votes					
Votes cast / turnout					
Abstentions					
Registered voters	1,106,690				
Sources
Footnotes: ^{1} Within the Unite alliance in the 2023 election.

=== 2023 ===
Summary of the 23 July 2023 Congress of Deputies election results in A Coruña
Parties and alliances	Popular vote			Seats	
Parties and alliances	Votes	%	±pp	Total	+/−
People's Party (PP)	292,272	43.13	+12.63	4	+1
Socialists' Party of Galicia (PSdeG–PSOE)	190,897	28.17	–1.85	2	–1
Unite Galicia (Sumar)^{1}	82,618	12.19	–2.43	1	±0
Galician Nationalist Bloc (BNG)	67,653	9.98	+0.50	1	±0
Vox (Vox)	34,410	5.08	–3.12	0	±0
Animalist Party with the Environment (PACMA)^{2}	3,096	0.46	–0.29	0	±0
Workers' Front (FO)	1,011	0.15	New	0	±0
Zero Cuts (Recortes Cero)	548	0.08	–0.07	0	±0
Blank ballots	5,197	0.77	–0.42		
Total	677,702			8	±0
Valid votes	677,702	99.20	+0.34		
Invalid votes	5,485	0.80	–0.34		
Votes cast / turnout	683,187	62.93	+5.89		
Abstentions	402,486	37.07	–5.89		
Registered voters	1,085,673				
Sources
Footnotes: ^{1} Unite Galicia results are compared to the combined totals of In Common–United We Can and More Country–Equo in the November 2019 election.; ^{2} Animalist Party with the Environment results are compared to Animalist Party Against Mistreatment of Animals totals in the November 2019 election.

=== November 2019 ===
Summary of the 10 November 2019 Congress of Deputies election results in A Coruña
Parties and alliances	Popular vote			Seats	
Parties and alliances	Votes	%	±pp	Total	+/−
People's Party (PP)	187,127	30.50	+4.99	3	±0
Socialists' Party of Galicia (PSdeG–PSOE)	184,178	30.02	–1.38	3	±0
In Common–United We Can (Podemos–EU)	77,069	12.56	–2.21	1	±0
Galician Nationalist Bloc (BNG)	58,135	9.48	+2.82	1	+1
Vox (Vox)	50,325	8.20	+2.56	0	±0
Citizens–Party of the Citizenry (Cs)	28,469	4.64	–7.42	0	–1
More Country–Equo (Más País–Equo)	12,619	2.06	New	0	±0
Animalist Party Against Mistreatment of Animals (PACMA)	4,572	0.75	–0.31	0	±0
Spanish Communist Workers' Party (PCOE)	1,689	0.28	+0.01	0	±0
Zero Cuts–Green Group (Recortes Cero–GV)	925	0.15	–0.05	0	±0
For a Fairer World (PUM+J)	607	0.10	New	0	±0
Communist Party of the Workers of Galicia (PCTG)	472	0.08	–0.01	0	±0
Blank ballots	7,307	1.19	+0.02		
Total	613,494			8	±0
Valid votes	613,494	98.86	+0.18		
Invalid votes	7,056	1.14	–0.18		
Votes cast / turnout	620,550	57.04	–6.06		
Abstentions	467,289	42.96	+6.06		
Registered voters	1,087,839				

=== April 2019 ===
Summary of the 28 April 2019 Congress of Deputies election results in A Coruña
Parties and alliances	Popular vote			Seats	
Parties and alliances	Votes	%	±pp	Total	+/−
Socialists' Party of Galicia (PSdeG–PSOE)	212,665	31.40	+9.64	3	+1
People's Party (PP)	172,799	25.51	–14.57	3	–1
In Common–United We Can (Podemos–EU–Mareas en Común–Equo)^{1}	100,019	14.77	–8.32	1	–1
Citizens–Party of the Citizenry (Cs)	81,677	12.06	+2.68	1	+1
Galician Nationalist Bloc (BNG)	45,095	6.66	+3.65	0	±0
Vox (Vox)	38,187	5.64	+5.48	0	±0
Animalist Party Against Mistreatment of Animals (PACMA)	7,176	1.06	–0.01	0	±0
In Tide (En Marea)	6,806	1.00	New	0	±0
Spanish Communist Workers' Party (PCOE)	1,814	0.27	New	0	±0
Zero Cuts–Green Group (Recortes Cero–GV)	1,331	0.20	–0.05	0	±0
Commitment to Galicia (CxG)	1,272	0.19	New	0	±0
Communist Party of the Workers of Galicia (PCTG)	600	0.09	New	0	±0
Blank ballots	7,901	1.17	+0.13		
Total	677,342			8	±0
Valid votes	677,342	98.68	–0.14		
Invalid votes	9,067	1.32	+0.14		
Votes cast / turnout	686,409	63.10	+3.23		
Abstentions	401,447	36.90	–3.23		
Registered voters	1,087,856				
Sources
Footnotes: ^{1} In Common–United We Can results are compared to Podemos–Anova–EU totals in the 2016 election.

=== 2016 ===
Summary of the 26 June 2016 Congress of Deputies election results in A Coruña
Parties and alliances	Popular vote			Seats	
Parties and alliances	Votes	%	±pp	Total	+/−
People's Party (PP)	257,855	40.08	+4.58	4	+1
In Tide (Podemos–Anova–EU)	148,566	23.09	–3.25	2	±0
Socialists' Party of Galicia (PSdeG–PSOE)	139,973	21.76	+1.33	2	±0
Citizens–Party of the Citizenry (C's)	60,347	9.38	–0.53	0	–1
Galician Nationalist Bloc–We–Galician Candidacy (BNG–Nós)^{1}	19,343	3.01	–1.53	0	±0
Animalist Party Against Mistreatment of Animals (PACMA)	6,857	1.07	+0.30	0	±0
Zero Cuts–Green Group (Recortes Cero–GV)	1,583	0.25	+0.02	0	±0
Vox (Vox)	1,026	0.16	–0.02	0	±0
Communists of Galicia (PCPE–CdG)	754	0.12	–0.09	0	±0
Internationalist Solidarity and Self-Management (SAIn)	392	0.06	±0.00	0	±0
Blank ballots	6,693	1.04	–0.10		
Total	643,389			8	±0
Valid votes	643,389	98.82	+0.07		
Invalid votes	7,676	1.18	–0.07		
Votes cast / turnout	651,065	59.87	–2.83		
Abstentions	436,407	40.13	+2.83		
Registered voters	1,087,472				
Sources
Footnotes: ^{1} Galician Nationalist Bloc–We–Galician Candidacy results are compared to We–Galician Candidacy totals in the 2015 election.

=== 2015 ===
Summary of the 20 December 2015 Congress of Deputies election results in A Coruña
Parties and alliances	Popular vote			Seats	
Parties and alliances	Votes	%	±pp	Total	+/−
People's Party (PP)	239,303	35.50	–16.02	3	–2
In Tide (Podemos–Anova–EU)^{1}	177,581	26.34	+21.03	2	+2
Socialists' Party of Galicia (PSdeG–PSOE)	137,734	20.43	–6.89	2	±0
Citizens–Party of the Citizenry (C's)	66,784	9.91	New	1	+1
We–Galician Candidacy (Nós)^{2}	30,618	4.54	–7.16	0	–1
Animalist Party Against Mistreatment of Animals (PACMA)	5,169	0.77	+0.36	0	±0
Union, Progress and Democracy (UPyD)	3,531	0.52	–0.80	0	±0
Zero Cuts–Green Group (Recortes Cero–GV)	1,548	0.23	New	0	±0
Communists of Galicia (PCPE–CdG)	1,447	0.21	+0.01	0	±0
Vox (Vox)	1,246	0.18	New	0	±0
Land Party (PT)	1,119	0.17	New	0	±0
Internationalist Solidarity and Self-Management (SAIn)	429	0.06	–0.01	0	±0
Blank ballots	7,674	1.14	–0.69		
Total	674,183			8	±0
Valid votes	674,183	98.75	+0.30		
Invalid votes	8,562	1.25	–0.30		
Votes cast / turnout	682,745	62.70	+0.33		
Abstentions	406,077	37.30	–0.33		
Registered voters	1,088,822				
Sources
Footnotes: ^{1} In Tide results are compared to United Left–The Greens: Plural Left totals in the 2011 election.; ^{2} We–Galician Candidacy results are compared to Galician Nationalist Bloc totals in the 2011 election.

=== 2011 ===
Summary of the 20 November 2011 Congress of Deputies election results in A Coruña
Parties and alliances	Popular vote			Seats	
Parties and alliances	Votes	%	±pp	Total	+/−
People's Party (PP)	343,270	51.52	+8.85	5	+1
Socialists' Party of Galicia (PSdeG–PSOE)	182,056	27.32	–13.69	2	–1
Galician Nationalist Bloc (BNG)	77,945	11.70	–0.27	1	±0
United Left–The Greens: Plural Left (EU–V)	30,557	4.59	+3.02	0	±0
Union, Progress and Democracy (UPyD)	8,812	1.32	+0.72	0	±0
Equo (Equo)	4,802	0.72	New	0	±0
Animalist Party Against Mistreatment of Animals (PACMA)	2,709	0.41	+0.22	0	±0
For a Fairer World (PUM+J)	1,241	0.19	+0.09	0	±0
Communist Party of the Peoples of Spain (PCPE)	776	0.12	New	0	±0
Humanist Party (PH)	694	0.10	+0.05	0	±0
XXI Convergence (C.XXI)	487	0.07	New	0	±0
Internationalist Solidarity and Self-Management (SAIn)	476	0.07	+0.03	0	±0
Communist Unification of Spain (UCE)	319	0.05	New	0	±0
Blank ballots	12,173	1.83	+0.65		
Total	666,317			8	±0
Valid votes	666,317	98.45	–0.85		
Invalid votes	10,520	1.55	+0.85		
Votes cast / turnout	676,837	62.37	–7.59		
Abstentions	408,395	37.63	+7.59		
Registered voters	1,085,232				

=== 2008 ===
Summary of the 9 March 2008 Congress of Deputies election results in A Coruña
Parties and alliances	Popular vote			Seats	
Parties and alliances	Votes	%	±pp	Total	+/−
People's Party (PP)	316,688	42.67	–1.92	4	±0
Socialists' Party of Galicia (PSdeG–PSOE)	304,398	41.01	+2.11	3	–1
Galician Nationalist Bloc (BNG)	88,830	11.97	+0.27	1	±0
United Left–Alternative (EU–IU)	11,669	1.57	–0.34	0	±0
Union, Progress and Democracy (UPyD)	4,468	0.60	New	0	±0
The Greens of Europe (LVdE)	1,800	0.24	New	0	±0
Anti-Bullfighting Party Against Mistreatment of Animals (PACMA)	1,410	0.19	New	0	±0
Social Democratic Party (PSD)	1,060	0.14	New	0	±0
For a Fairer World (PUM+J)	773	0.10	New	0	±0
Citizens–Party of the Citizenry (C's)	496	0.07	New	0	±0
Humanist Party (PH)	381	0.05	–0.10	0	±0
Spanish Phalanx of the CNSO (FE de las JONS)	341	0.05	+0.02	0	±0
National Democracy (DN)	288	0.04	–0.02	0	±0
Family and Life Party (PFyV)	288	0.04	New	0	±0
Internationalist Solidarity and Self-Management (SAIn)	287	0.04	New	0	±0
Electronic Voting Assembly (AVE)	144	0.02	New	0	±0
Spanish Alternative (AES)	127	0.02	New	0	±0
Blank ballots	8,783	1.18	–0.63		
Total	742,231			8	–1
Valid votes	742,231	99.30	+0.01		
Invalid votes	5,232	0.70	–0.01		
Votes cast / turnout	747,463	69.96	–0.64		
Abstentions	320,970	30.04	+0.64		
Registered voters	1,068,433				

=== 2004 ===
Summary of the 14 March 2004 Congress of Deputies election results in A Coruña
Parties and alliances	Popular vote			Seats	
Parties and alliances	Votes	%	±pp	Total	+/−
People's Party (PP)	329,389	44.59	–7.35	4	–1
Socialists' Party of Galicia (PSdeG–PSOE)	287,324	38.90	+14.14	4	+2
Galician Nationalist Bloc (BNG)	86,459	11.70	–7.57	1	–1
United Left (EU–IU)	14,125	1.91	+0.49	0	±0
Party of Self-employed and Professionals (AUTONOMO)	1,659	0.22	–0.04	0	±0
Humanist Party (PH)	1,130	0.15	+0.04	0	±0
Republican Left–Galician Republican Left (IR–ERG)	1,082	0.15	New	0	±0
Democratic and Social Centre (CDS)	1,012	0.14	+0.05	0	±0
Galician Coalition (CG)	827	0.11	–0.01	0	±0
Galician People's Front (FPG)	775	0.10	+0.01	0	±0
National Democracy (DN)	438	0.06	New	0	±0
Spanish Democratic Party (PADE)	430	0.06	+0.01	0	±0
Spanish Phalanx of the CNSO (FE de las JONS)	243	0.03	New	0	±0
The Phalanx (FE)	234	0.03	–0.03	0	±0
Republican Social Movement (MSR)	207	0.03	New	0	±0
Blank ballots	13,347	1.81	+0.32		
Total	738,681			9	±0
Valid votes	738,681	99.29	±0.00		
Invalid votes	5,255	0.71	±0.00		
Votes cast / turnout	743,936	70.60	+6.76		
Abstentions	309,802	29.40	–6.76		
Registered voters	1,053,738				

=== 2000 ===
Summary of the 12 March 2000 Congress of Deputies election results in A Coruña
Parties and alliances	Popular vote			Seats	
Parties and alliances	Votes	%	±pp	Total	+/−
People's Party (PP)	340,434	51.94	+4.65	5	±0
Socialists' Party of Galicia–Progressives (PSdeG–PSOE–p)	162,273	24.76	–9.09	2	–1
Galician Nationalist Bloc (BNG)	126,287	19.27	+6.53	2	+1
United Left (EU–IU)	9,321	1.42	–2.88	0	±0
Party of Self-employed and Professionals (AUTONOMO)	1,676	0.26	New	0	±0
Galician Democracy (DG)	1,347	0.21	New	0	±0
Galician Coalition (CG)	788	0.12	New	0	±0
Humanist Party (PH)	746	0.11	+0.02	0	±0
Centrist Union–Democratic and Social Centre (UC–CDS)	619	0.09	–0.09	0	±0
Galician People's Front (FPG)	606	0.09	–0.03	0	±0
Natural Law Party (PLN)	531	0.08	New	0	±0
The Phalanx (FE)	379	0.06	New	0	±0
Spanish Democratic Party (PADE)	320	0.05	New	0	±0
Spain 2000 Platform (ES2000)	319	0.05	New	0	±0
Blank ballots	9,741	1.49	+0.51		
Total	655,387			9	±0
Valid votes	655,387	99.29	–0.14		
Invalid votes	4,654	0.71	+0.14		
Votes cast / turnout	660,041	63.84	–6.99		
Abstentions	373,924	36.16	+6.99		
Registered voters	1,033,965				

=== 1996 ===
Summary of the 3 March 1996 Congress of Deputies election results in La Coruña
Parties and alliances	Popular vote			Seats	
Parties and alliances	Votes	%	±pp	Total	+/−
People's Party (PP)	325,922	47.29	+3.06	5	±0
Socialists' Party of Galicia (PSdeG–PSOE)	233,344	33.85	–3.42	3	–1
Galician Nationalist Bloc (BNG)	87,824	12.74	+4.38	1	+1
United Left–Galician Left (EU–EG)	29,669	4.30	–1.14	0	±0
The Greens of Galicia (Os Verdes)	3,102	0.45	+0.09	0	±0
Centrist Union (UC)	1,228	0.18	–1.60	0	±0
Galician People's Front (FPG)	825	0.12	New	0	±0
Humanist Party (PH)	619	0.09	+0.04	0	±0
Blank ballots	6,736	0.98	+0.01		
Total	689,269			9	±0
Valid votes	689,269	99.43	+0.36		
Invalid votes	3,928	0.57	–0.36		
Votes cast / turnout	693,197	70.83	+1.11		
Abstentions	285,422	29.17	–1.11		
Registered voters	978,619				

=== 1993 ===
Summary of the 6 June 1993 Congress of Deputies election results in La Coruña
Parties and alliances	Popular vote			Seats	
Parties and alliances	Votes	%	±pp	Total	+/−
People's Party (PP)	281,077	44.23	+8.40	5	+1
Socialists' Party of Galicia (PSdeG–PSOE)	236,812	37.27	+0.45	4	±0
Galician Nationalist Bloc (BNG)	53,153	8.36	+4.27	0	±0
United Left–Galician Unity (EU–UG)	34,550	5.44	+1.50	0	±0
Democratic and Social Centre (CDS)	11,328	1.78	–7.23	0	–1
The Greens (Os Verdes)^{1}	2,276	0.36	–0.22	0	±0
Galician Alternative (AG)	2,252	0.35	New	0	±0
The Ecologists (LE)	1,883	0.30	–0.09	0	±0
Galician Nationalist Convergence (CNG)	1,357	0.21	New	0	±0
Workers' Socialist Party (PST)	1,355	0.21	–0.42	0	±0
Ruiz-Mateos Group–European Democratic Alliance (ARM–ADE)	1,156	0.18	–0.83	0	±0
Communist Party of the Galician People (PCPG)	874	0.14	+0.02	0	±0
Coalition for a New Socialist Party (CNPS)^{2}	340	0.05	–0.03	0	±0
Humanist Party (PH)	336	0.05	–0.03	0	±0
Natural Law Party (PLN)	281	0.04	New	0	±0
Party of El Bierzo (PB)	277	0.04	New	0	±0
Communist Unification of Spain (UCE)	0	0.00	New	0	±0
Blank ballots	6,136	0.97	+0.05		
Total	635,443			9	±0
Valid votes	635,443	99.07	+0.59		
Invalid votes	5,938	0.93	–0.59		
Votes cast / turnout	641,381	69.72	+9.90		
Abstentions	278,586	30.28	–9.90		
Registered voters	919,967				
Sources
Footnotes: ^{1} The Greens results are compared to The Greens–Green List totals in the 1989 election.; ^{2} Coalition for a New Socialist Party results are compared to Alliance for the Republic totals in the 1989 election.

=== 1989 ===
Summary of the 29 October 1989 Congress of Deputies election results in La Coruña
Parties and alliances	Popular vote			Seats	
Parties and alliances	Votes	%	±pp	Total	+/−
Socialists' Party of Galicia (PSdeG–PSOE)	190,844	36.82	–2.33	4	±0
People's Party (PP)^{1}	185,709	35.83	–0.23	4	±0
Democratic and Social Centre (CDS)	46,675	9.01	–1.10	1	±0
Galician Nationalist Bloc (BNG)	21,202	4.09	+1.53	0	±0
United Left (EU)	20,397	3.94	+2.64	0	±0
Galician Socialist Party–Galician Left (PSG–EG)	15,670	3.02	–0.63	0	±0
Galician Nationalist Party–Galicianist Party (PNG–PG)	5,539	1.07	New	0	±0
Ruiz-Mateos Group (Ruiz-Mateos)	5,255	1.01	New	0	±0
Galician Coalition (CG)	5,173	1.00	–2.64	0	±0
Workers' Socialist Party (PST)	3,258	0.63	+0.02	0	±0
The Greens–Green List (LV–LV)	3,029	0.58	New	0	±0
Workers' Party of Spain–Communist Unity (PTE–UC)^{2}	2,713	0.52	–0.66	0	±0
The Ecologist Greens (LVE)	2,008	0.39	New	0	±0
Spanish Vertex Ecological Development Revindication (VERDE)	1,539	0.30	New	0	±0
Galician People's Front (FPG)	1,346	0.26	New	0	±0
Revolutionary Workers' Party of Spain (PORE)	646	0.12	New	0	±0
Communist Party of the Galician People (PCPG)	633	0.12	New	0	±0
Spanish Phalanx of the CNSO (FE–JONS)	570	0.11	–0.10	0	±0
Asturianist Party (PAS)	434	0.08	New	0	±0
Alliance for the Republic (AxR)^{3}	430	0.08	–0.11	0	±0
Humanist Party (PH)	421	0.08	New	0	±0
Communist Party of Spain (Marxist–Leninist) (PCE (m–l))^{4}	0	0.00	–0.19	0	±0
Blank ballots	4,775	0.92	+0.33		
Total	518,266			9	±0
Valid votes	518,266	98.48	+0.05		
Invalid votes	8,012	1.52	–0.05		
Votes cast / turnout	526,278	59.82	+0.21		
Abstentions	353,484	40.18	–0.21		
Registered voters	879,762				
Sources
Footnotes: ^{1} People's Party results are compared to People's Coalition totals in the 1986 election.; ^{2} Workers' Party of Spain–Communist Unity results are compared to Communists' Unity Board totals in the 1986 election.; ^{3} Alliance for the Republic results are compared to Internationalist Socialist Workers' Party totals in the 1986 election.; ^{4} Communist Party of Spain (Marxist–Leninist) results are compared to Republican Popular Unity totals in the 1986 election.

=== 1986 ===
Summary of the 22 June 1986 Congress of Deputies election results in La Coruña
Parties and alliances	Popular vote			Seats	
Parties and alliances	Votes	%	±pp	Total	+/−
Socialists' Party of Galicia (PSdG–PSOE)	200,522	39.15	+0.93	4	±0
People's Coalition (AP–PDP–PL)^{1}	184,681	36.06	+0.90	4	±0
Democratic and Social Centre (CDS)	51,763	10.11	+7.36	1	+1
Galician Socialist Party–Galician Left (PSG–EG)^{2}	18,669	3.65	+2.02	0	±0
Galician Coalition (CG)	18,662	3.64	New	0	±0
Galician Nationalist Bloc (BNG)	13,092	2.56	–0.65	0	±0
Galicianist and United Left Platform (PG–EU)^{3}	6,639	1.30	–0.47	0	±0
Communists' Unity Board (MUC)	6,042	1.18	New	0	±0
Workers' Socialist Party (PST)	3,130	0.61	–0.54	0	±0
Communist Unification of Spain (UCE)	1,528	0.30	+0.11	0	±0
Internationalist Socialist Workers' Party (POSI)	975	0.19	New	0	±0
Republican Popular Unity (UPR)^{4}	953	0.19	+0.05	0	±0
Spanish Phalanx of the CNSO (FE–JONS)	942	0.18	New	0	±0
Party of the Communists of Catalonia (PCC)	834	0.16	New	0	±0
National Unity Coalition (CUN)	692	0.14	New	0	±0
Union of the Democratic Centre (UCD)	n/a	n/a	–12.98	0	–1
Blank ballots	3,017	0.59	+0.06		
Total	512,141			9	±0
Valid votes	512,141	98.43	+0.20		
Invalid votes	8,188	1.57	–0.20		
Votes cast / turnout	520,329	59.61	–5.40		
Abstentions	352,549	40.39	+5.40		
Registered voters	872,878				
Sources
Footnotes: ^{1} People's Coalition results are compared to People's Alliance–People's Democratic Party totals in the 1982 election.; ^{2} Galician Socialist Party–Galician Left results are compared to Galician Left totals in the 1982 election.; ^{3} Galicianist and United Left Platform results are compared to Communist Party of Galicia totals in the 1982 election.; ^{4} Republican Popular Unity results are compared to Communist Party of Spain (Marxist–Leninist) totals in the 1982 election.

=== 1982 ===
Summary of the 28 October 1982 Congress of Deputies election results in La Coruña
Parties and alliances	Popular vote			Seats	
Parties and alliances	Votes	%	±pp	Total	+/−
Socialists' Party of Galicia (PSdG–PSOE)	196,359	38.22	+20.32	4	+2
People's Alliance–People's Democratic Party (AP–PDP)^{1}	180,619	35.16	+23.38	4	+3
Union of the Democratic Centre (UCD)	66,689	12.98	–33.63	1	–5
Galician Nationalist Bloc–Galician Socialist Party (B–PSG)^{2}	16,469	3.21	–8.75	0	±0
Democratic and Social Centre (CDS)	14,146	2.75	New	0	±0
Communist Party of Galicia (PCE–PCG)	9,113	1.77	–2.94	0	±0
Galician Left (EG)	8,350	1.63	New	0	±0
Workers' Socialist Party (PST)	5,912	1.15	New	0	±0
Independent Galician Electoral Group (AEGI)	5,512	1.07	New	0	±0
Galician Independents and Migrants (IDG)	2,236	0.44	New	0	±0
Spanish Communist Workers' Party (PCOE)	1,653	0.32	New	0	±0
New Force (FN)^{3}	1,216	0.24	–1.59	0	±0
Spanish Solidarity (SE)	1,036	0.20	New	0	±0
Communist Unification of Spain (UCE)	980	0.19	New	0	±0
Communist Party of Spain (Marxist–Leninist) (PCE (m–l))	740	0.14	New	0	±0
Communist Left (LCR–MC)^{4}	0	0.00	–0.81	0	±0
Blank ballots	2,708	0.53	+0.44		
Total	513,738			9	±0
Valid votes	513,738	98.23	+0.13		
Invalid votes	9,281	1.77	–0.13		
Votes cast / turnout	523,019	65.01	+11.69		
Abstentions	281,442	34.99	–11.69		
Registered voters	804,461				
Sources
Footnotes: ^{1} People's Alliance–People's Democratic Party results are compared to Democratic Coalition totals in the 1979 election.; ^{2} Galician Nationalist Bloc–Galician Socialist Party results are compared to the combined totals of the Galician National-Popular Bloc and Galician Unity in the 1979 election.; ^{3} New Force results are compared to National Union totals in the 1979 election.; ^{4} Communist Left results are compared to the combined totals of Communist Movement of Galicia–Organization of Communist Left and Revolutionary Communist League in the 1979 election.

=== 1979 ===
Summary of the 1 March 1979 Congress of Deputies election results in La Coruña
Parties and alliances	Popular vote			Seats	
Parties and alliances	Votes	%	±pp	Total	+/−
Union of the Democratic Centre (UCD)	200,120	46.61	–2.63	6	±0
Spanish Socialist Workers' Party (PSOE)^{1}	76,873	17.90	–4.85	2	±0
Democratic Coalition (CD)^{2}	50,588	11.78	+0.63	1	±0
Galician Unity (PG–POG–PSG)^{3}	28,136	6.55	+2.86	0	±0
Galician National-Popular Bloc (BNPG)	23,247	5.41	+3.63	0	±0
Communist Party of Spain (PCE)	20,213	4.71	+0.99	0	±0
Spanish Socialist Workers' Party (historical) (PSOEh)^{4}	12,368	2.88	+1.83	0	±0
National Union (UN)^{5}	4,285	1.00	+0.53	0	±0
Party of Labour of Spain (PTE)^{6}	3,043	0.71	+0.11	0	±0
Workers' Communist Party (PCT)	2,271	0.53	New	0	±0
Communist Movement of Galicia–Organization of Communist Left (MCG–OIC)	2,254	0.52	New	0	±0
Republican Left (IR)	1,490	0.35	New	0	±0
Communist Organization of Spain (Red Flag) (OCE–BR)	1,446	0.34	New	0	±0
Workers' Revolutionary Organization (ORT)^{7}	1,423	0.33	–0.08	0	±0
Revolutionary Communist League (LCR)^{8}	1,224	0.29	–0.10	0	±0
Blank ballots	402	0.09	–0.46		
Total	429,383			9	±0
Valid votes	429,383	98.10	+0.48		
Invalid votes	8,319	1.90	–0.48		
Votes cast / turnout	437,702	53.32	–9.82		
Abstentions	383,172	46.68	+9.82		
Registered voters	820,874				
Sources
Footnotes: ^{1} Spanish Socialist Workers' Party results are compared to the combined totals of Spanish Socialist Workers' Party and People's Socialist Party–Socialist Unity in the 1977 election.; ^{2} Democratic Coalition results are compared to People's Alliance totals in the 1977 election.; ^{3} Galician Unity results are compared to Galician Socialist Party totals in the 1977 election.; ^{4} Spanish Socialist Workers' Party (historical) results are compared to Democratic Socialist Alliance totals in the 1977 election.; ^{5} National Union results are compared to National Alliance July 18 totals in the 1977 election.; ^{6} Party of Labour of Spain results are compared to Democratic Left Front totals in the 1977 election.; ^{7} Workers' Revolutionary Organization results are compared to Workers' Electoral Group totals in the 1977 election.; ^{8} Revolutionary Communist League results are compared to Front for Workers' Unity totals in the 1977 election.

=== 1977 ===
Summary of the 15 June 1977 Congress of Deputies election results in La Coruña
Parties and alliances	Popular vote			Seats	
Parties and alliances	Votes	%	±pp	Total	+/−
Union of the Democratic Centre (UCD)	221,996	49.24	n/a	6	n/a
Spanish Socialist Workers' Party (PSOE)	78,598	17.43	n/a	2	n/a
People's Alliance (AP)	50,256	11.15	n/a	1	n/a
People's Socialist Party–Socialist Unity (PSP–US)	23,978	5.32	n/a	0	n/a
Communist Party of Spain (PCE)	16,777	3.72	n/a	0	n/a
Galician Socialist Party (PSG)	16,660	3.69	n/a	0	n/a
Christian Democratic Team of the Spanish State (PGSD–PPG)	12,674	2.81	n/a	0	n/a
Galician National-Popular Bloc (BNPG)	8,027	1.78	n/a	0	n/a
Democratic Socialist Alliance (ASDCI)	4,728	1.05	n/a	0	n/a
Galician Democratic Party (PDG)	3,196	0.71	n/a	0	n/a
Democratic Left Front (FDI)	2,705	0.60	n/a	0	n/a
National Alliance July 18 (AN18)	2,116	0.47	n/a	0	n/a
Spanish Social Reform (RSE)	2,000	0.44	n/a	0	n/a
Workers' Electoral Group (AET)	1,833	0.41	n/a	0	n/a
Front for Workers' Unity (FUT)	1,738	0.39	n/a	0	n/a
Spanish Phalanx of the CNSO (Authentic) (FE–JONS(A))	1,144	0.25	n/a	0	n/a
Blank ballots	2,458	0.55	n/a		
Total	450,884			9	n/a
Valid votes	450,884	97.62	n/a		
Invalid votes	10,986	2.38	n/a		
Votes cast / turnout	461,870	63.14	n/a		
Abstentions	269,629	36.86	n/a		
Registered voters	731,499				

== Bibliography ==
- Ley 1/1977, de 4 de enero, para la Reforma Política (Fundamental Law 1/1977). Official State Gazette (in Spanish). 4 January 1977. BOE-A-1977-165.
- Real Decreto-ley 20/1977, de 18 de marzo, sobre Normas Electorales (Royal Decree-Law 20/1977). Official State Gazette (in Spanish). 18 March 1977. BOE-A-1977-7445.
- Constitución Española (Constitution). Official State Gazette (in Spanish). 27 December 1978. BOE-A-1978-31229.
- Ley Orgánica 5/1985, de 19 de junio, del Régimen Electoral General (Organic Law 5/1985). Official State Gazette (in Spanish). 19 June 1985. BOE-A-1985-11672.
- Carreras de Odriozola, Albert; Tafunell Sambola, Xavier (2005) [1989]. Estadísticas históricas de España, siglos XIX-XX (PDF) (in Spanish). Vol. 1 (II ed.). Bilbao: Fundación BBVA. pp. 1072–1097. ISBN 84-96515-00-1. Archived from the original (PDF) on 24 September 2015.
