= A Coruña (disambiguation) =

A Coruña is a city and municipality of Galicia, Spain.

A Coruña, La Coruña or Coruña may also refer to:

== Places ==
- Province of A Coruña, a province in Galicia, Spain
- A Coruña (comarca), in the Province of A Coruña, Galicia, Spain
- Coruña del Conde, a village and municipality in the southern province of Burgos, Castile and León Spain
- A Coruña Airport, the airport serving the Galician city of A Coruña, Galicia, Spain
- A Coruña (Congress of Deputies constituency), one of the 52 electoral districts used for the Spanish Congress of Deputies
- University of A Coruña, a public university located in the city of A Coruña, Galicia, Spain
- Coliseum da Coruña, a stadium for concerts and shows used in A Coruña, Galicia, Spain
- Port of A Coruña, a port in A Coruña, Spain, on the Atlantic Ocean
- Coruña (mountain), in the region of Tacna, Peru

== Sport ==
- Deportivo de La Coruña, a Spanish professional football club based in the city of A Coruña, Galicia, Spain
  - Deportivo de La Coruña B, the reserve team of Real Club Deportivo de La Coruña
- CB Coruña, a professional basketball team based in A Coruña, Galicia, Spain
- HC Liceo La Coruña, a rink hockey club based in A Coruña, Galicia, Spain
- Deportivo La Coruña Brasil Futebol Clube, a Brazilian football club based in Rio de Janeiro, Rio de Janeiro state

== See also ==
- Corunna (disambiguation)
