= Santa Cruz Futebol Clube (disambiguation) =

Santa Cruz Futebol Clube is a professional football club in Recife, Pernambuco, Brazil.

Santa Cruz Futebol Clube may also refer to these football clubs:

- Santa Cruz Futebol Clube (Minas Gerais), in Belo Horizonte, Brazil
- Santa Cruz Futebol Clube (Rio Grande do Norte), in Natal, Brazil
- Santa Cruz Futebol Clube (Rio de Janeiro), in Rio de Janeiro, Brazil
- Santa Cruz F.C. (Timor-Leste), in Dili, Timor-Leste
- Futebol Clube Santa Cruz, in Santa Cruz do Sul, Rio Grande do Sul, Brazil
