= Estádio Eduardo Guinle =

Multi-use stadium in Nova Friburgo, Brazil

Coordinates: 22°17′55″S 42°32′29″W

- Interactive map of Estádio Eduardo Guinle
- Full name: Estádio Ildo Meneghetti
- Location: Nova Friburgo, Brazil
- Capacity: 12,000

Tenants
- Deportivo La Coruña Brasil Futebol Clube; Friburguense Atlético Clube; Santa Cruz Futebol Clube

Estádio Eduardo Guinle is a multi-use stadium located in Nova Friburgo, Brazil. It is used mostly for football matches and hosts the home matches of Friburguense Atlético Clube, Deportivo La Coruña Brasil Futebol Clube and Santa Cruz Futebol Clube. The stadium has a maximum capacity of 12,000 people.
