= Corunna (disambiguation) =

Corunna is the traditional English name of the city of A Coruña in Spain and the surrounding province of A Coruña.

Corunna may also refer to:

== Battles ==
- Battle of Corunna, fought near Corunna in 1809
- Second Battle of the Corunna Road, 1936–37
- Third Battle of the Corunna Road, 1937

== Places ==
=== Australia ===
- Corunna, New South Wales, a small town and rural locality
- Corunna Station, a pastoral lease in South Australia

=== United States ===
- Corunna, Indiana
- Corunna, Michigan
  - Corunna High School

=== Other ===
- Corunna, Ontario, Canada, named for the 1809 battle
- Corunna Barracks, former barracks in Ludgershall, Wiltshire, England

== Other uses ==
- HMS Corunna (D97), United Kingdom warship

== See also ==
- A Coruña (disambiguation)
