= Santa Cruz Futebol Clube (Rio de Janeiro) =

Santa Cruz
- Full name: Santa Cruz Futebol Clube
- Founded: October 1, 2007
- Ground: Estádio Eduardo Guinle, Nova Friburgo, Rio de Janeiro state, Brazil
- Capacity: 6,550
Home colours	Away colours	colours

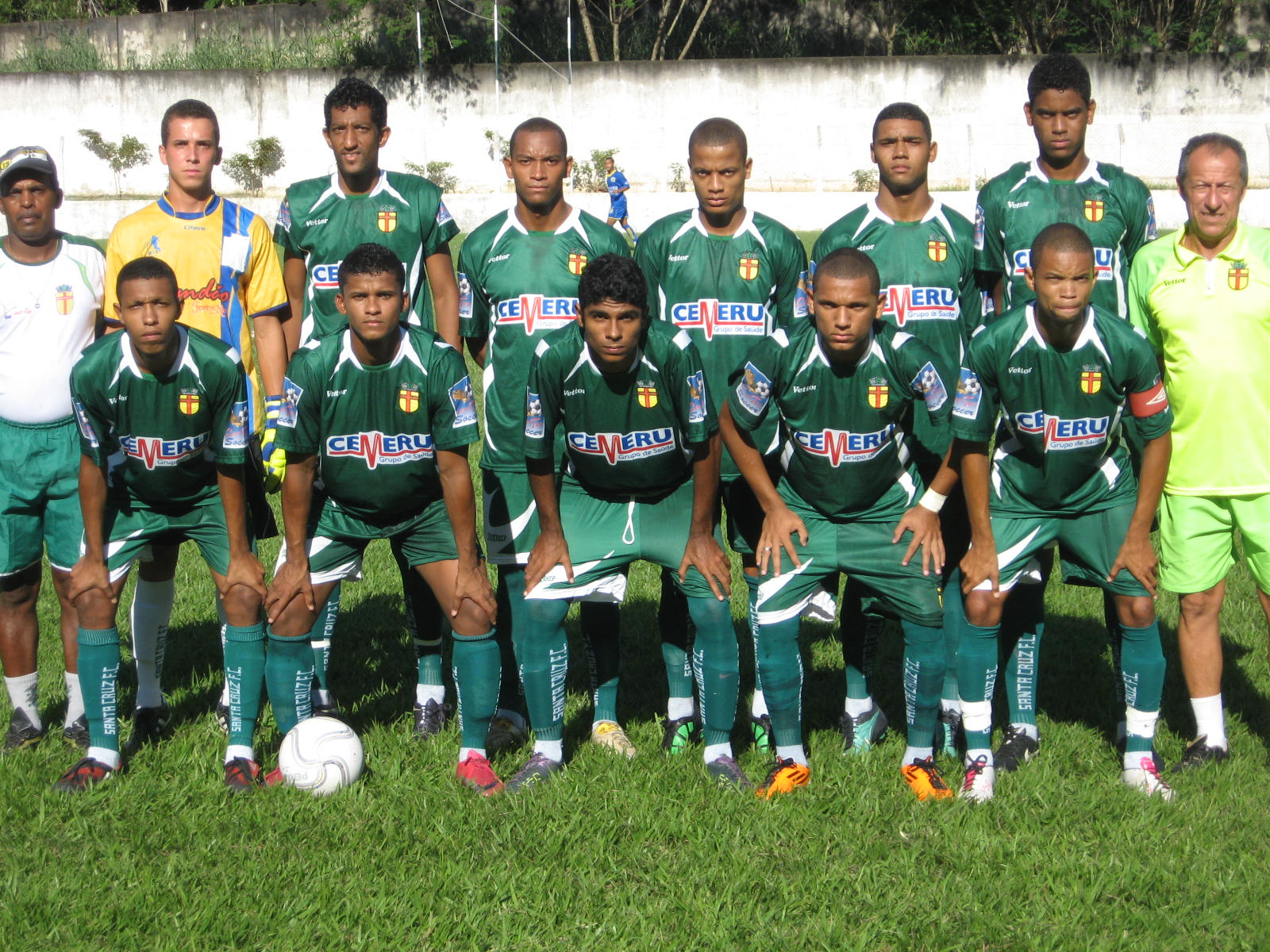
Team photo from the 2011 season

Santa Cruz Futebol Clube, commonly known as Santa Cruz, is a Brazilian football club based in Rio de Janeiro, Rio de Janeiro state.

== History ==
The club was founded on October 1, 2007. The club professionalized its football department in 2009, competing in the same year in the Campeonato Carioca Third Level.

== Stadium ==
Santa Cruz Futebol Clube play their home games at Estádio Eduardo Guinle, located in Nova Friburgo. The stadium has a maximum capacity of 6,550 people.
