= We–Galician Candidacy =

We–Galician Candidacy Nós–Candidatura Galega
- Founded: 6 November 2015
- Dissolved: 2016
- Ideology: Galician nationalism; Left-wing nationalism; Socialism
- Political position: Left-wing

Website
- www.polaunion.gal

We–Galician Candidacy (Galician: Nós–Candidatura Galega) was an electoral alliance of Galician nationalist parties formed ahead of the 2015 Spanish general election by the Galician Nationalist Bloc (BNG), Galician Coalition (CG), Galicianist Party (PG), Communist Party of the Galician People (PCPG) and Galician Workers' Front (FOGA). The alliance failed in securing parliamentary representation in the general election, leaving the BNG out of the Congress of Deputies for the first time in 20 years.

== History ==
The alliance had its roots in the "Initiative for the Union" citizen platform (Galician: Iniciativa pola Unión, IxU), which grouped the Galician Nationalist Bloc (BNG), Galician Coalition (CG), Galicianist Party (PG), Communist Party of the Galician People (PCPG) and Galician Workers' Front (FOGA) around the common goal of contesting the 2015 Spanish general election under a joint candidacy comprising all Galician nationalist parties. Negotiations with the parties coalescing around the similarly-purposed "Citizen Meeting for a Galician Tide" (Galician: Encontro Cidadán por unha Marea Galega) platform foundered, and the parties within the IxU platform agreed to run on their own under the "We–Galician Candidacy" label. The BNG agreed to renounce to its trademark and dilute it into a larger umbrella, as well as giving up all media presence rights and economic support in favour of the alliance, which it defended as "the only true choice" for a Galician-only candidacy. Carlos Callón was selected as the candidacy's leading candidate, running in the A Coruña constituency, with old members from CG and the PG also being included in the lists.

After the negative results in the 2015 election, the BNG chose to recover its trademark ahead of the 2016 general election. The PG and CG dropped out from the list, and the alliance was rearranged as a supplement to the BNG, but on 26 June it underperformed its previous 2015 result. The alliance's structure was maintained ahead of the 2016 Galician regional election.

On 27 January 2017, the FOGA was integrated as an internal current within the BNG.

== Composition ==
Party	Notes
Galician Nationalist Bloc (BNG)	
Galician Workers' Front (FOGA)	
Communist Party of the Galician People (PCPG)	
Galicianist Party (PG)	In the 2015 general election.
Galician Coalition (CG)	In the 2015 general election.

== Electoral performance ==
=== Cortes Generales ===
==== Nationwide ====
Cortes Generales
Election	Congress					Senate		Leading candidate	Status in legislature
Election	Votes	%	#	Seats	+/–	Seats	+/–	Leading candidate	Status in legislature
2015	70,863	0.28%	13th	0 / 350	2 (Note: Compared to Galician Nationalist Bloc totals in the 1982 general election.)	0 / 208	0	Carlos Callón	No seats

==== Regional breakdown ====
Cortes Generales
Election	Galicia						
Election	Congress					Senate	
Election	Votes	%	#	Seats	+/–	Seats	+/–
2015	70,863	4.32%	5th	0 / 23	2	0 / 16	0
