= Deportivo La Coruña Brasil Futebol Clube =

La Coruña
- Full name: Deportivo La Coruña Brasil Futebol Clube
- Founded: November 15, 1994 (31 years ago)
- Ground: Estádio Eduardo Guinle, Nova Friburgo, Rio de Janeiro state, Brazil
- Capacity: 6,550
- President: Maria Geralda dos Santos
Home colors	Away colors	colors

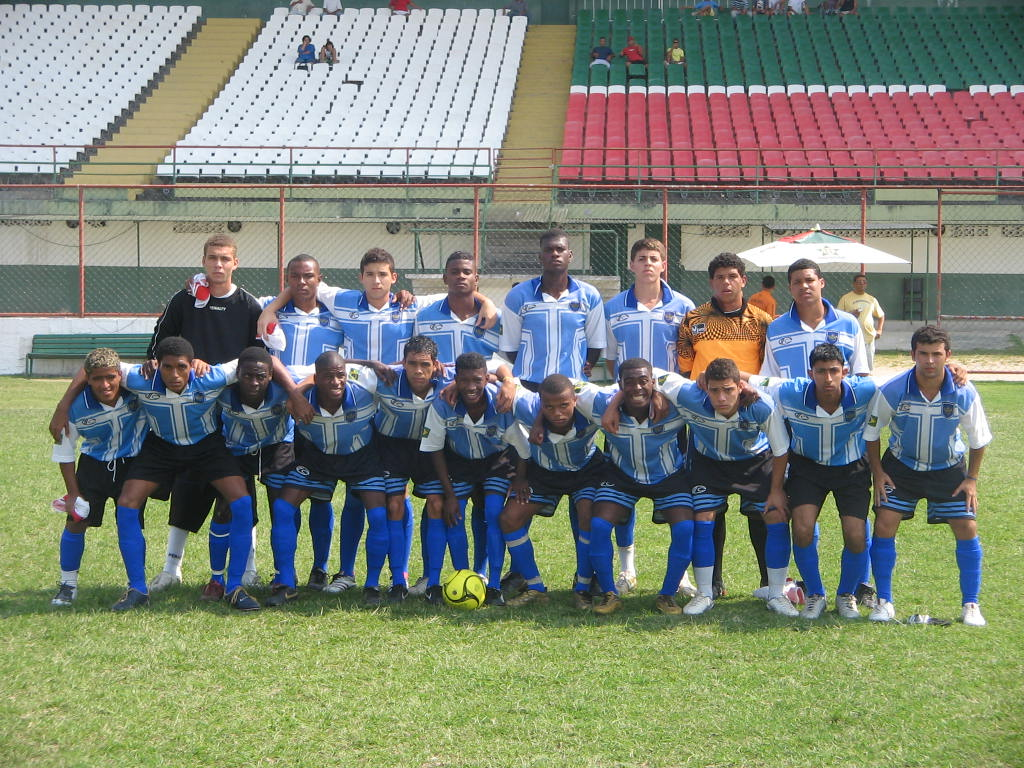
Team photo from the 2007 season

Deportivo La Coruña Brasil Futebol Clube, commonly known as La Coruña, is a Brazilian football club based in Rio de Janeiro, Rio de Janeiro state.

== History ==
The club was founded on November 15, 1994, being named after the spanish club Deportivo de A Coruña (at the time named Deportivo de La Coruña), by the club's lifelong president, Maria Geralda dos Santos, due to Bebeto's spell at the spanish team.

== Stadium ==
Deportivo La Coruña Brasil Futebol Clube play their home games at Estádio Eduardo Guinle, located in Nova Friburgo. The stadium has a maximum capacity of 6,550 people.
