= Communist Movement of Galicia =

Communist Movement of Galicia Movemento Comunista de Galiza
- Secretary-General: Xesús Veiga Buxán
- Founded: 1976
- Dissolved: 1991
- Merged into: Inzar
- Headquarters: Santiago de Compostela, Spain
- Newspaper: Galicia en Loita
- Youth wing: Galician Revolutionary Youth
- Ideology: Communism; Galician nationalism Leninism; Maoism (until 1983)
- Colors: Red
- Local seats (1979-1983): 5 / 4,033

Communist Movement of Galicia (Galician: Movemento Comunista de Galiza, MCG) was a communist political party created in Galicia during the last years of the dictatorship of Franco as the Galician section of the Communist Movement, although in practice the MCG acted as an independent party. The leaders of the MCG were Xesús Veiga Buxán and Carmen Santos Castroviejo. Unlike other sections of Spanish left-wing political parties, the MCG was close to the Galician nationalist movement and supported self-determination and national sovereignty for Galicia.

== History ==
During the transition, the MCG was part of the Council of Galician Political Forces (CFPG), along with the Galician Socialist Party (PSG), the Galician People's Union (UPG), the Galician Social Democratic Party (PGSD) and the Carlist Party of Galicia. In the Spanish elections of 1977, the MCG supported the Galician Democratic Candidacy, a coalition of socialists, communists and Christian democrats to the Senate. The MCG supported the self-determination of the Galician people, promoting the "No" in the 1980 Statute of Autonomy referendum, since the organization considered the autonomy not enough.

In the first Galician elections, in 1981, the MCG presented a list in coalition with the Revolutionary Communist League (LCR), obtaining 4,858 votes (0.49%). In the elections to the Parliament of Galicia 1985 the candidacy of the MCG (without the LCR) gained only 1,327 votes (0.11%). In the municipal elections of 1987 and 1991 the MCG gained a town councilor in Padrón.

In 1991 the MCG was integrated into a new group, Inzar along with the LCR, a group that a few years later joined the Galician Nationalist Bloc (BNG).
