= Communist Party of the Galician People =

Communist Party of the Galician People Partido Comunista do Pobo Galego
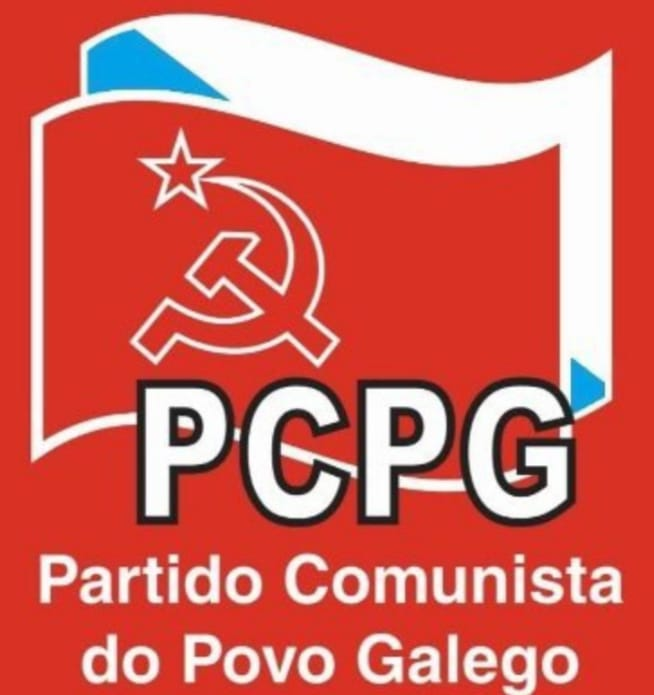
- Spokesperson: Xosé Collazo Castro
- Founded: 1984
- Ideology: Communism; Galician independence Marxism-leninism
- Political position: Far-left
- National affiliation: None (2012-today). Close to the Galician Nationalist Bloc; Forum for the Galician Communist Unity (2011–2012); Communist Party of the Peoples of Spain (1984–2008)
- International affiliation: World Anti-Imperialist Platform
- Trade union affiliation: Confederación Intersindical Galega (CIG)

Website
- pcpg.gal

The Communist Party of the Galician People (Galician: Partido Comunista do Pobo Galego, PCPG) is a Galician political organization with a communist and independentist ideology founded in 1984.

== History ==
The PCPG was established in 1984, in parallel to the process of rebuilding unity of the pro-Soviet Spanish communists that was happening across Spain, with the participation of various communist parties, like the Party of Communists of Catalonia or the Unified Communist Party of Spain, against the prevailing eurocommunism in the direction of the PCE and PCG. This process led to the founding of the Communist Party (PC), the predecessor of which was then Communist Party of the Peoples of Spain (PCPE).

The PCPG has participated in many elections. Its last participation was in the general elections 2008, presenting 3 candidates for the Spanish Senate in the province of Ourense, obtaining 4,243 (1.04% of the total), 3,428 (0.86%) and 3,413 votes (0.83%) respectively. The party also got 507 votes for the Congreso de los Diputados (188 in the Province of Lugo and 319 in the Province of Ourense).

In 2008 the PCPG broke with the PCPE due to their different view of the Galician national question.

Since 2007 the PCPG has participated in the Cangas Left Alternative coalition in Cangas do Morrazo, which since 2015 governs that municipality.

In 2011 and 2012 the PCPG participated in the Forum for the Galician Communist Unity (FUCG), trying to find the unity of the Galician independentist communism, along with the Maoist collective Ateneu Proletário Galego and the classical Leninist organization Forxa.

Since 2014 the party has become closer to the Galician Nationalist Bloc (BNG). In the European elections of 2014 the party called to vote for The Peoples Decide (a coalition of the BNG and various independentist parties from the rest of Spain). In the 2015 local elections the PCPG called to vote the BNG candidatures. Various PCPG members joined some lists of the BNG.

In the general elections of 2015 the party joined Us-Galician Candidacy, a coalition led by the Galician Nationalist Bloc, that got the 4.32% of the vote. In the same elections the general secretary of the party run as a candidate for the Spanish senate in the Province of Pontevedra, getting 31,375 votes (2.08% of the total), failing to win a seat.

== Elections ==
Election	Votes	%	Seats
1989 Galician regional election	989	0.07	0 / 75
Congress of Deputies, 2008	507	0.11	0 / 350

=== Spanish Senate elections ===
Year	Votes	Percentage	Elected
2008 (María Hortensia Núñez Insua for a Senate seat in Ourense)	2,768	0.83	No
2008 (Emilio José López Blanco for a Senate seat in Ourense)	2,877	0.86	No
2008 (Begoña Ares Piñeiro for a Senate seat in Ourense)	3,467	1.04	No
2008 (Consuelo Ares Piñeiro for a Senate seat in Lugo)	272	0.08	No
2015 (Xosé Collazo Castro for a Senate seat in Pontevedra)	31,375	2.08	No
