= Galician People's Party =

Galician People's Party Partido Popular Galego
- President: Xaime Illa Couto
- Founded: 1976
- Dissolved: 1979
- Merger of: Unión Democrática de Galicia; Esquerda Democrática Galega
- Membership (February 1977): 117
- Ideology: Galician nationalism Christian democracy Federalism
- National affiliation: Equipo Demócrata Cristiano del Estado Español

The Galician People's Party (Galician: Partido Popular Galego, Galician: Partido Popular Gallego, PPG) was a Galician political party in the first years of the Spanish democracy.

== History ==
It was founded in July 1976 as a result of the union of the Democratic Union of Galicia, led by Xaime Illa Couto, and the Galician Democratic Left, led by Fernando García Agudín. They participated in the activities of the Christian Democratic Team of the Spanish State, but they didn't enter it. In the general elections of 1977 it allied with the Galician Social Democratic Party. It disappeared in 1979. Some of its members joined the Partido Galeguista and others the Democratic Center Union.
