= Partido Galeguista (1978) =

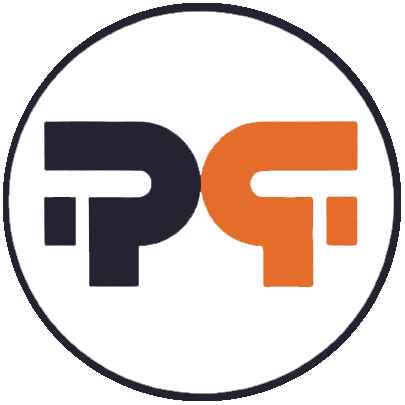
- Leader: Luís Sobrado and Álvarez Gándara
- Founded: 6 November 1978
- Dissolved: 1984
- Merger of: Galician Social Democratic Party and the Galician People's Party
- Succeeded by: Galician Coalition and Partido Galeguista (Nationalist)
- Ideology: Galician nationalism Social democracy Social liberalism Federalism
- Political position: Center to center-left
- Colors: Orange; Black

The Partido Galeguista (English: Galicianist Party) was a Galician party founded in 1978, referring to itself as the historical descendant of the Partido Galeguista in the Second Spanish Republic (1931-1939).

== History ==
After the electoral failure of the coalition of the Galician People's Party and the Galician Social-Democratic Party, members of both decided to re-form the Partido Galeguista, convoking a conference in November 1978.

In the Spanish General and regional elections of 1979, the party formed a coalition called the Unidade Galega and supported a "Yes" vote in the referendum for the Statute that granted autonomy to Galicia in 1980. At the Party conference in June 1981, the Partido Galeguista's policies took a right-wing turn, and Álvarez Gándara was chosen as president. The left-wing faction of the Party, led by Luís Sobrado, was expelled. In the Galician elections of 1981, the party obtained 32,623 votes (3.23%), and in the municipal elections of 1983 only 10,752 votes.

In the extraordinary assembly of February 1984, many members supported the merger of the party into the Galician Coalition. After this, Manuel Beiras left the party and founded the Partido Galeguista (Nationalist).

== Elections ==
Election	Votes	%	Seats
Galician regional election, 1981	32,623	3.31%	0 / 71
