= Galician Social Democratic Party =

Galician Social Democratic Party Partido Galego Social Demócrata
- Leader: Xosé Luís Fontela
- Founded: 1974
- Dissolved: 1977
- Succeeded by: Partido Galeguista
- Ideology: Social democracy Galician nationalism

The Galician Social Democratic Party (PGSD, Partido Galego Social Demócrata in Galician language) was a Galician political party with a Galician nationalist and social democratic ideology.

It was founded under the name of Galician Social-Democratic Union in March 1974, led by Xosé Luís Fontela and Alfonso Zulueta de Haz. The PGSD just had some relevant presence in the cities. The PGSD was part of the Council of the Galician Political Forces (CFPG, 1976), leaving the council, along with the Galician People's Union in 1977, due to disagreements on the acceptance of the Communist Movement of Galicia in the CFPG.

The PGSD concurred in coalition with the Galician People's Party (PPG) in the Spanish general election of 1977. The poor results (23,014 votes, 2.04% of the vote in Galicia) led to the formation of a new party formed by the PGSD and PPG, the new Partido Galeguista, and the disappearance of PGSD.
