= List of nationalist organizations =

This is a list of nationalist organizations. Clarification of which sort of nationalism is given after some entries. This list does not include governments and formal armies.

== Africa ==
=== Egypt ===
- Union of State Supporters- nationalist group

=== Ethiopia ===
- Oromo Liberation Front – ethnic nationalism
- Ogaden National Liberation Front – ethnic nationalism
- National Movement of Amhara – ethnic nationalism
- Sidama Liberation Front – ethnic nationalism
- Amhara Democratic Party – ethnic nationalism
- Oromo Democratic Party – ethnic nationalism
- Afar National Democratic Party – ethnic nationalism
- Benishangul-Gumuz People's Democratic Unity Front – ethnic nationalism
- Ethiopian Somali People's Democratic Party – ethnic nationalism
- Gambela People's Democratic Movement – ethnic nationalism
- Hareri National League – ethnic nationalism
- Tigray People's Liberation Front – ethnic nationalism
- Argoba Nationality Democratic Organization – ethnic nationalism
- Oromo Federalist Democratic Movement – ethnic nationalism

=== South Africa ===
- National Party – White nationalist
- Pan Africanist Congress – Black nationalist, liberation movement
- AWB – White nationalist
- Freedom Front Plus – moderate, Afrikaner nationalist and separatist
- Inkatha Freedom Party – populist, Zulu nationalist and conservative
- Blanke Bevrydingsbeweging (English: White Liberation Movement) (BBB) – The BBB sought a white South Africa by the removal of the black population.
- Herstigte Nasionale Party (English: Reconstituted National Party) – A far-right wing party supporting Afrikaner nationalism and a return to apartheid.
- South African Gentile National Socialist Movement

=== Zimbabwe ===
- ZANU–PF

== Europe ==
=== Albania ===
- Democratic Party of Albania - centre-right nationalist political party
- Party for Justice, Integration and Unity - right-wing, ethnic nationalist political party
- Red and Black Alliance - right-wing, ethnic nationalist political party
- Albanian Fascist Party
- Albanian National Front Party - nationalist political party with branches in North Macedonia and Kosovo
- Democratic National Front Party
- Movement for United Albania - irredentist and nationalist political movement
- National Unity Party - ultra-nationalist political party, supports a pan-Albanian confederation
- Natural Albania - pacifist, nationalist political party supporting Greater Albania and union with Kosovo

=== Armenia ===
- Adequate Party – far-right, nationalist political party
- Hosank – far-right, extremist, nationalist political movement
- Sasna Tsrer Pan-Armenian Party – right-wing, nationalist political party

=== Austria ===
- Austrian Freedom Party – right-wing to far-right, classical liberal, Pan-German nationalist, anti-immigration

=== Belgium ===
==== Nationwide ====
- National Front
- Bloed, Bodem, Eer en Trouw
- Parti Communautaire National-Européen
- Parti Communautaire Européen
- Racial Volunteer Force

==== Flanders ====
- New Flemish Alliance – Flemish nationalist, centre-right
- Vlaams Belang – Flemish nationalist, right-wing to far-right
- Spirit – liberal Flemish nationalistic
- Order of Flemish Militants – Flemish nationalist, far-right
- Nationalistische Studentenvereniging - far-right student organisation
- Schild & Vrienden - far-right youth organisation linked with Identitarian movement

==== Wallonia ====
- Rassemblement Wallonie France – Walloon secessionist, aiming to unite French-speaking Belgians with France

=== Bosnia and Herzegovina ===
==== Bosniak ====
- Bosnian Movement of National Pride - Bosniak far-right nationalist political organization
- Bosnian-Herzegovinian Patriotic Party - Bosniak centre-right nationalist political party
- Independent Bloc - Bosniak centrist nationalist conservative political party
- Movement of Democratic Action - Bosniak right-wing regionalist nationalist conservative political party
- Party for Bosnia and Herzegovina - Bosniak centrist nationalist political party
- Party of Democratic Activity - Bosniak right-wing nationalist conservative political party

==== Croat ====
- Croat People's Union - former Croat nationalist, conservative political party favouring decentralization
- Croatian Coalition - Croat nationalist, right-wing, favouring decentralization, former coalition of Croatian Democratic Union 1990 and Croatian Party of Rights of Bosnia and Herzegovina
- Croatian Democratic Union 1990 - Croat nationalist, conservative, federalist centre-right political party
- Croatian Democratic Union of Bosnia and Herzegovina - Croat nationalist, conservative, federalist, Christian democratic political party
- Croatian National Assembly - federalist political organisation of Croat political parties in Bosnia and Herzegovina
- Croatian Party of Rights of Bosnia and Herzegovina - Croat nationalist far-right political party
- Croatian Peasant Party of Bosnia and Herzegovina - Christian democratic, agrarian, Croat nationalist, federalist, centrist political party
- Party of Croatian Right - Croat nationalist, conservative, eurosceptic right-wing political party
- Party of Rights of Bosnia and Herzegovina 1861 - a Croat party that's a pendant of the Croatian Party of Rights 1861 in Croatia. It is a Croat nationalist, conservative, eurosceptic right-wing political party

==== Serb ====
- Serbian Radical Party "9th January" - Serb nationalist far-right party in Republika Srpska
- Serbian Radical Party of Republika Srpska - Serb nationalist centre-right political party in Republika Srpska
- Alliance of Independent Social Democrats - Serb left-wing nationalist and separatist political party
- Democratic People's Alliance - regionalist, national conservative, Serb nationalist centre-right political party
- Party of Democratic Progress - national conservative, Serb nationalist centre-right political party
- Serb Democratic Party - Serb right-wing nationalist and separatist political party
- United Srpska - Serb nationalist political party in Republika Srpska

=== Bulgaria ===
- VMRO-BND - nationalist anti-macedonian political party
- NFSB - far-right political party
- Revival - far-right pro-russian political party
- Atack - neo-fascist political party
- KOD - right-wing to far-right political party
- SPS „Defense“ - nationalist political party
- Volya Movement - far-right nationalist political party
- OMO Ilinden-Pirin - macedonian minority nationalist political party

=== Croatia ===
- Croatian Pure Party of Rights - far-right political party

=== Cyprus ===
- EOKA - a defunct a Greek Cypriot nationalist guerrilla organisation that fought a campaign for the end of British rule in Cyprus, for the island's self-determination and for eventual union with Greece
- EOKA-B - defunct Greek Cypriot paramilitary organisation
- TMT - Turkish Cypriot pro-taksim paramilitary organisation
- Union of Cypriots - Cypriot nationalist (left-wing)

=== Denmark ===
- Bornholm's Self-Government Party - Bornholm separatism

=== Estonia ===
- Vaps Movement – historic
- Estonian Independence Party – ethnic
- Conservative People's Party of Estonia – ethnic nationalist, traditionalist party
- Sinine Äratus – nationalist youth organization linked with Identitarian movement

=== Finland ===
- Perussuomalaiset
- Suomen Sisu
- Blue and White Front
- Pohjoismainen Vastarintaliike – (Nordic Resistance Movement)

=== France ===
==== National ====
- Action Française – integralist and monarchist
- Croix de Feu – far-right
- National Rally – support of Jus sanguinis and return to traditional values
- Debout la France – eurosceptic, national-conservative and souverainist
- The Patriots – eurosceptic, right-wing populist and souverainist
- Party of France
- Renouveau français
- Identity Bloc
- Unité Radicale
- Fédération d'action nationale et européenne
- Jeunesses Patriotes
- Groupe Union Défense
- Third Way
- Nouvelle Résistance
- Revolutionary Nationalist Groups
- Party of New Forces

==== Breton ====
- Adsav – Breton nationalist secessionist party
- Party for the Organization of a Free Brittany
- Unvaniezh Demokratel Breizh - left-wing Breton nationalist, autonomist, and regionalist political party
- Breton Autonomist Party
- Breton Communist Party
- Breton Federalist League
- Breton National Party
- Breton Nationalist Party
- Breton Party
- Breton Social-National Workers' Movement
- Emgann
- Young Bretons Movement/Ar Vretoned Yaouank

==== Corsican ====
- Armata Corsa - an underground separatist terrorist organization in Corsica, today disbanded
- Corsica Nazione – Corsican nationalist party
- Corsican Nationalist Alliance - political party endorsing Corsican nationalism
- Corsican Workers' Trade Union - nationalist labour union
- National Liberation Front of Corsica - secessionist militant group
- Party of the Corsican Nation - Corsican nationalist and autonomist political party
- Pè a Corsica - Corsican nationalist political party
- Union of the Corsican People - defunct Corsican nationalist political favouring self-government and pacifism
- Unione Naziunale - Corsican nationalist group of secessionist political parties

=== Georgia ===
- Conservative Party of Georgia - Centre-right and nationalist political party
- Free Georgia - centre-left nationalist political party
- Georgian March - far-right nationalist Organization
- Georgian Dream - Right-wing populist political party
- Georgian Troupe - Left-wing nationalist political party

=== Germany ===
- Alternative for Germany (AfD) – far-right
- The Homeland – far-right, ethnic
- German People's Union – ethnic
- National Socialist German Workers Party (Nazi Party) – far-right, ethnic

=== Greece ===
- Golden Dawn – far-right, Greek ultranationalist party and convicted criminal organization
- Greeks for the Fatherland - a successor of Golden Dawn
- National Popular Consciousness - a successor of Golden Dawn
- Greek National Socialist Party
- National Union of Greece
- 4th of August Party
- Front Line
- New Right
- Independent Greeks
- Popular Orthodox Rally

=== Hungary ===
- Fidesz – Right-wing national conservative political party
- Jobbik – Conservative and radically patriotic Christian party
- Hungarian Justice and Life Party – Nationalist political party
- Sixty-Four Counties Youth Movement - Far-right movement
- Force and Determination – Far-right Hungarian nationalist political movement
- Our Homeland Movement – Far-right political party

=== Ireland ===
- Young Irelanders
- Fenian Brotherhood
- Irish Republican Army – historic organisation, led the independence war
- Provisional Irish Republican Army – modern organisation, led a campaign during The Troubles 1969–1998
- Continuity Irish Republican Army and Real Irish Republican Army – small splinter groups, opposed to the peace process
- Sinn Féin – republican, left-wing
- Social Democratic and Labour Party – Northern Ireland based, moderate
- Irish Parliamentary Party – 19th century, pro home rule
- National Party – nationalist, right-wing

=== Italy ===
- Brothers of Italy-National Alliance – support of Jus sanguinis and national conservatism
- CasaPound – far-right neo-fascist
- New Force – ultranationalism
- The Right – right-wing
- Tricolour Flame – far-right neo-fascist
- Italian Social Movement – right-wing to far-right, from 1946 to 1995
- National Fascist Party – historic, ruled Italy from 1922 to 1943
- Republican Fascist Party
- Fascism and Freedom Movement – far-right, neo-fascist and anti-zionist, split from Italian Social Movement

=== Kosovo ===
==== Albanian ====
- Albanian Alliance
- Albanian National Front Party - nationalist political party branch of the main party in Albania
- Albanian Christian Democratic Party of Kosovo
- Alliance for the Future of Kosovo
- National Movement for the Liberation of Kosovo
- People's Movement of Kosovo
- Movement for Integration and Unification - irredentist movement
- Movement for Unification
- Social Democratic Initiative
- Vetëvendosje

==== Serbian ====
- Independent Liberal Party
- New Democracy
- Progressive Democratic Party (Kosovo)
- Serb Civic Initiative
- Serb Kosovo-Metohija Party
- Serb List
- Serb People's Party
- Serbian List for Kosovo and Metohija
- Serbian National Council of Kosovo and Metohija
- Union of Independent Social Democrats of Kosovo and Metohija

=== Latvia ===
- All for Latvia!
- National Alliance
- National Union
- National Union "Justice"
- Pērkonkrusts
- Rising Sun for Latvia

=== Montenegro ===
- Party of Serb Radicals - Serbian far-right nationalist political party

=== Netherlands ===
- Party for Freedom
- Forum for Democracy
- Dutch People's Union

=== North Macedonia ===
==== Albanian ====
- Albanian National Front Party - nationalist political party branch of the main party in Albania
- Alliance for Albanians
- Democratic Party of Albanians

==== Macedonian ====
- VMRO-DPMNE, Christian democratic, nationalist political party
- United for Macedonia - right wing conservative-nationalist political party

=== Norway ===
- Nasjonal Samling (National Gathering) – fascist
- Norges Nasjonalsosialistiske Bevegelse (National Socialist Movement of Norway)
- Vigrid
- Heathen Front

=== Poland ===
- National Radical Camp
- All-Polish Youth
- National Movement - main national democratic political party strongly working with the All-Polish Youth (part of the Confederation)
- League of Polish Families - national democratic political party
- National Revival of Poland - national radical political party (working with National Radical Camp)
- Falanga - illegal and unregistered national radical organization considered to be terrorist
- Camp of Great Poland

=== Portugal ===
- National Renovator Party - far-right nationalist party
- New Social Order - neo-fascist political movement

=== Romania ===
- Noua Dreaptă - Far-right
- Everything For the Country Party - Neo-Legionarism
- Greater Romania Party – Nationalism
- United Romania Party – Nationalism

=== Russia ===
- United Russia - Right-wing
- Liberal Democratic Party of Russia - Far-right
- Great Russia - Far-right

=== Serbia ===
- Serbian Radical Party
- Dveri
- Obraz
- Serbian Action

=== Slovakia ===
- Slovenská národná strana – nationalist, right-wing
- We Are Family – nationalist and conservative, centre-right to right-wing
- Kotleba – People's Party Our Slovakia – far-right ultranationalist party, regarded as neo-fascist or neo-Nazi

=== Spain ===
==== Nationwide ====
- Falange – fascist
- National Democracy – far-right ultranationalist
- National Alliance – far-right and neo-Nazi
- Vox - far-right political party
- Spanish Alternative
- España 2000
- Republican Social Movement – third-positionist political party
- European Nation State – European nationalist political party of Spain.
- Bases Autónomas – violent neo-Nazi group that was active in Spain in the 80's and 90's.
- CEDADE – national-socialist cultural and political association, founded in 1966 and dissolved in 1993.

==== Asturias ====
- Conceyu Nacionalista Astur – left-wing (Marxist, socialist and anarchist) independentist (defunct)
- Movimiento Comunista d'Asturies – Maoist party in favour of the self-determination (defunct)
- Unidá Nacionalista Asturiana – left-wing independentist (refounded in 2007)
- Andecha Astur – left-wing independentist
- Andecha Obrera – far left-wing independentist armed group in the 1980s (not to be confused with "Andecha Astur")

==== Basque Country ====
- Amaiur – left-wing independentist party
- Basque Nationalist Party, Christian-Democrat political party
- Basque National Liberation Movement – virtual union between left-wing independentist parties, youths
- Batasuna – left-wing independentist (banned in Spain, not in France, see Abertzaleen Batasuna)
- EH Bildu – left-wing independentist party
- ETA – Marxist–Leninist armed group active from the 1960s to 2018.
- Haika, Segi and Jarrai – left-wing independentist youth organizations (banned in Spain)
- Langile Abertzaleen Batzordeak – left-wing independentist workers union

==== Canary Islands ====
- Canary Islands Independence Movement - defunct Canarian nationalist independentist organization
- National Congress of the Canaries - separatist political party
- Popular Front of the Canary Islands - Canarian nationalist independentist leftist political party
- Azarug
- Canarian Assembly
- Canarian Coalition
- Canarian Convergence
- Canarian Independent Groups
- Canarian Nationalist Alternative
- Canarian Nationalist Left
- Canarian Nationalist Party
- Canarian People's Union
- Canarian Popular Alternative
- Communist Cells
- Provisional Communist Party of the Canary Islands
- Independent Herrenian Group
- Inekaren
- Nationalist Canarian Assembly
- Nationalist Canarian Initiative
- Party of Communist Unification in the Canaries
- Tenerife Group of Independents
- United Canarian People
- Unity of the People
- We Are Lanzarote - left-wing Canarian and ecologist political party based on the island of Lanzarote

==== Catalonia ====
- Catalan European Democratic Party (PDECAT) - right-wing pro-independence party.
- Democratic Convergence of Catalonia - right-wing pro-independence party refounded as PDECAT.
- Esquerra Republicana de Catalunya (ERC) – left-wing independentist party.
- Òmnium Cultural - nationalist pro-independence cultural association
- Platform for Catalonia – Far-right xenophobic and Spanish unionist organization.
- PSAN – communist independentist party
- Popular Unity Candidature (CUP) - far-left pro-independence party.
- Terra Lliure – left-wing independentist armed group

==== Galicia ====
- Galician Nationalist Bloc – left-wing independentist party

=== Sweden ===
- Nordic Resistance Movement
- National Socialist Front a former Neo-Nazi political party.
- Party of the Swedes – White nationalist
- Sweden Democrats – social conservative with a nationalist foundation, but has been characterised by others as far-right, right-wing populist, national-conservative, and anti-immigration.
- The Nordic Realm Party
- Alternative for Sweden

=== Switzerland ===
- Campaign for an Independent and Neutral Switzerland – Pro-Swiss neutrality and independence
- Swiss People's Party
- Freedom Party of Switzerland
- National Front
- Party of Farmers, Traders and Independents
- Swiss Nationalist Party

=== Turkey ===
==== Nationwide ====
- Grey Wolves – ultra-nationalist organisation
- Ergenekon – allegedly clandestine, secularist ultra-nationalist organization
- Victory Party (Turkey) – Turkish nationalism, Kemalist and anti-immigration
- Turkish Revenge Brigade
- Nationalist Movement Party
- Good Party – Kemalist and nationalist
- Great Union Party – Islamist and ultra-nationalist
- Rights and Equality Party – Kemalist and nationalist
- Nationalist and Conservative Party
- Independent Turkey Party
- Nation Party
- National Party
- People's Ascent Party – Kemalist, centrist, social democratic and nationalist political party
- Homeland Party – right-wing, nationalist and conservative, political party

=== Ukraine ===
- Organization of Ukrainian Nationalists
- Tryzub (organization)
- Congress of Ukrainian Nationalists
- Svoboda – right-wing to far-right Ukrainian nationalist political party
- Right Sector
- Azov Battalion
- Patriots of Ukraine
- Social-National Party of Ukraine
- Social-National Assembly

=== United Kingdom ===
==== Union-wide ====
- British National Party – fascist, far-right
- National Front – far-right
- British Union of Fascists – fascist, defunct
- Britain First – far-right, neo-fascist
- League of Empire Loyalists – far-right, imperialist, defunct
- National Action – neo-Nazi, youth organisation, proscribed
- UK Independence Party – Right-wing to far-right

==== Cornwall ====
- Mebyon Kernow – centre-left, social democratic, civic nationalism
- Cornish Nationalist Party – centre-right, Pan-Celticism

==== England ====
- English Democrats – in favour of English parliament and autonomy within the UK
- English independence – a political stance in favour of English independence from the UK

==== Northern Ireland ====
- Ulster Volunteer Force – loyalist, sectarian
- Ulster Defence Association – loyalist, sectarian
- Ulster Protestant Volunteers – loyalist, sectarian, populist
- Loyalist Volunteer Force – loyalist, fundamentalist, sectarian

==== Scotland ====
- Scottish National Party – centre-left, separatist, civic nationalism
- Grand Orange Lodge of Scotland – loyalist, sectarian

==== Wales ====
- Plaid Cymru – progressive, separatist, civic nationalism
- Free Wales Army – nationalist paramilitary
- Mudiad Amddiffyn Cymru- nationalist paramilitary

== Asia ==
=== Afghanistan ===
- National Islamic Movement of Afghanistan
- National Islamic Unity Party of Afghanistan
- National and Islamic Prosperity Party of Afghanistan
- National and Islamic Moderate Party of Afghanistan
- Solidarity Party of Afghanistan

=== Arab nations ===
- Arab Socialist Ba'ath Party
- Arab Socialist Ba'ath Party – Iraq Region
- Arab Socialist Ba'ath Party – Syria Region
- Arab Socialist Union (Egypt)
- National Union (United Arab Republic)
- National Liberation Front (Algeria)
- Palestine Liberation Organization
- Syrian Social Nationalist Party
- Hezbollah
- Guardians of the Cedars
- Kataeb Party
- Lebanese Forces Party

==== Palestine ====
- PLO - nationalist, left-wing, anti-zionism
- Fatah - Palestinian nationalism, anti-zionism, anti-imperialist, secularism
- Hamas - Palestinian nationalism, Islamist, anti-zionism
- Islamic Jihad Movement - islamist, religious nationalist, anti-zionism

=== Bangladesh ===
- Bangladesh Nationalist Party

=== China ===
- Kuomintang
- Young China Party
- Chinese Communist Party

=== India ===
- Bharatiya Janata Party
- Indian National Congress
- Shiv Sena
- Sangh Parivar

=== Iran ===
- Aria Party
- Azure Party
- Freedom Movement of Iran
- Nation Party of Iran
- National Front of Iran
- Nationalist-Religious movement
- Pan-Iranist Party
- SUMKA

=== Israel ===
==== Jewish ====
- Agudat Yisrael
- Degel HaTorah
- Eretz Yisrael Shelanu
- Hilltop Youth
- Lehava
- Likud
- Mishmeret tzniyut
- Nachala
- New Right
- Noam
- Otzma Yehudit
- Religious Zionist Party
- Shas
- The Revolt
- United Torah Judaism
- Yachad

==== Mix Arab-Jewish ====
- Da'am Workers Party
- Arab National Party
- Balad
- Ta'al
- United Arab List

=== Japan ===
- Greater Japan Patriotic Party - Japanese far-right political party
- Ishin Seito Shimpu - Japanese far-right political party
- Japan First Party - Japanese far-right political party
- Liberal Democratic Party (Japan) - Japanese nationalist, conservative
- National Socialist Japanese Workers' Party - Neo-Nazi political party
- Nippon Kaigi - Japanese ultranationalist and religious nationalist
- Sanseito - Japanese nationalist, ultraconservative
- Zaitokukai - Ultra-nationalist and far-right extremist political organization

==== local ====
- Nippon Ishin no Kai - Japanese nationalist, conservative
- Okinawa Social Mass Party - Left-wing nationalist, Okinawa regionalism

=== Korea ===
==== North Korea ====
- Workers' Party of Korea

==== South Korea ====
- People Power Party – Right-wing nationalist, national conservative, anti-communist
- United Future Party – Right-wing nationalist, anti-communist
- Future Korea Party – Right-wing nationalist, anti-communist
- Democratic Party of Korea – Liberal nationalist and Korean nationalist
- Minjung Party – Left-wing nationalist, Anti-imperialism

=== Kyrgyzstan ===
- Kyrk Choro

=== Nepal ===
- Rastriya Prajatantra Party
- Rastriya Prajatantra Party Nepal
- Hindu Prajatantrik Party
- GFP Ramdir Sena

=== Pakistan ===
==== Nationwide ====
- Pakistan Muslim League (Z) – far-right nationalists
- Muttahida Majlis-e-Amal – right-wing to far-right, religious nationalist

==== Muhajir ====
- Muttahida Qaumi Movement – London
- Mohajir Qaumi Movement Pakistan
- Muttahida Qaumi Movement – Pakistan

==== Balochistan ====
- Balochistan Liberation Army
- Balochistan Liberation Front/Baluchi Liberation Front
- Baluch People's Liberation Front
- Popular Front for Armed Resistance
- Baluchi Autonomist Movement

==== Pashtunistan ====
- Qaumi Watan Party

==== Sindh ====
- Jeay Sindh Muttahida Mahaz – nationalist, Liberal, liberation movement
- Sindhudesh Liberation Army – Militant, liberation movement

=== Sri Lanka ===
- Bodu Bala Sena
- Patriotic People's Front (Sri Lanka)
- Liberation Tigers of Tamil Eelam (Tamil Tigers) – independentist

=== Taiwan ===
- Democratic Progressive Party - Progressive, Taiwanese nationalism
- New Power Party - Progressive, Taiwanese nationalism
- Taiwan Statebuilding Party - Progressive, Taiwanese nationalism
- Kuomintang - Conservative, Chinese nationalism
- New Party - Conservative, Chinese nationalism
- Labor Party - Left-wing, Chinese nationalism

=== Vietnam ===
- Vietminh – communist, nationalist
- Vietcong – communist, nationalist
- Viet Quoc - nationalist
- Communist Party of Vietnam

== Americas ==
=== Brazil ===
- Brazilian Labour Renewal Party - right-wing to far-right party
- Patriota - Christian ultranationalist party
- Social Liberal Party - National conservative party
- Carecas do ABC – neo-Nazi group
- Alliance for Brazil - Right-wing populist party with a New nationalist ideology
- Party of the Reconstruction of the National Order - Right-wing political party to the far right. Extinct in 2006

=== Canada ===
==== Canadian nationalism ====
- Council of Canadians – progressive, anti-integration
- Canadian Action Party
- Confederation of Regions Party – ethnic nationalist, Far Right
- Canada First – historic
- The Waffle – (Defunct) radical faction of the New Democratic Party of Canada, later unsuccessful political party
- Western Block Party

==== Quebec nationalism ====
- Alliance laurentienne
- Bloc Québécois
- Parti indépendantiste
- Republic of Quebec Party
- Parti Québécois
- Quebec Liberal Party – federalist (opposed to independence), cultural nationalist
- Front de liberation du Quebec – independentist armed group
- Mouvement national des Québécoises et Québécois
- Rally for National Independence
- SPQ Libre

=== United States ===
- American Freedom Party – American white nationalist
- American Indian Movement – Panindianist
- America First Political Action Conference – White nationalist
- Choctaw Youth Movement – Choctaw nationalist
- Constitution Party – Paleoconservative nationalist
- Identity Evropa – Identitarian
- Ku Klux Klan – White supremacist
- League of the South – Southern nationalism, separatist
- New Black Panther Party – Black nationalist
- Patriot Front – White nationalist
- Proud Boys – American civic nationalist
- Moms for Liberty – American civic nationalist

== Oceania ==
=== Australia ===
- Pauline Hanson's One Nation – right-wing, anti-immigration, conservative, nationalist, populist
- Pauline's United Australia Party – right-wing, nationalist, conservative, protectionist
- Katter's Australian Party
- United Patriots Front
- Liberal Party of Australia
- Australia First Party – ultranationalist and neo-Nazi, far-right
- Antipodean Resistance – neo-Nazi group
- National Action – ethnic nationalist, far-right
- Fraser Anning's Conservative National Party - nationalist, conservative, anti-immigration
- WAR - Warriors of the Aboriginal Resistance - Ethnic (Aboriginal) Nationalism, decolonisation

=== Fiji ===
- George Speight and other participants in the 2000 Fijian coup d'état

=== New Zealand ===
- New Zealand First – populist, conservative, nationalist
- New Zealand National Front – far-right ultranationalist
