= List of political parties in the Canary Islands =

This article lists political parties in the Canary Islands.

== The parties ==
Most of the Spanish political parties are active in the Canary Islands. In addition are the following regional parties:

- People's Alternative for the Canary Islands (Alternativa Popular Canaria)
- Azarug
- Canarian Assembly (Asamblea Canaria)
- Canarian Coalition (Coalición Canaria)
- Canary Islands Independence Movement (Movimiento por la Autodeterminación e Independencia del Archipiélago Canario)
- Canarian Nationalist Alternative (Alternativa Nacionalista Canaria)
- Canarian Nationalist Party
- Canarian People's Union (Unión del Pueblo Canario)
- Canarian United Left
- Communist Cells (Células Comunistas)
- Communist Party of the Canaries (Partido Comunista de Canarias)
- Democratic Arucasian Union (Unión Aruquense Democrática)
- Inekaren (Organización Revolucionaria de Jóvenes Canarios Los Alzados)
- National Congress of the Canaries (Congreso Nacional de Canarias)
- New Canarias (Nueva Canarias)
- Party of Communist Unification in the Canaries (Partido de Unificación Comunista en Canarias)
- Popular Front of the Canary Islands (Frente Popular de las Islas Canarias)
- Socialist Canarian Party (Partido Canario Socialista)
- Unity of the People (Unidad del Pueblo)

== See also ==
- List of political parties by country
