= List of historical separatist movements in Europe =

This is a list of historical separatist movements in Europe. Separatism includes autonomism and secessionism.

== Criteria ==
What is and is not considered an autonomist or secessionist movement is sometimes contentious. Entries on this list must meet three criteria:

1. They are no longer an active movement with active members.
2. They are demanded greater autonomy or self-determination for a geographic region (as opposed to personal autonomy).
3. They were citizens/people of the conflict area and did not come from another country.

Under each region listed is one or more of the following:

- De facto state (de facto entity): for unrecognized regions with de facto autonomy.
- Proposed state: proposed name for a seceding sovereign state.
- Proposed autonomous area: for movements towards greater autonomy for an area but not outright secession.
  - De facto autonomous government: for governments with de facto autonomous control over a region.
  - Government-in-exile: for a government based outside of the region in question, with or without control.
  - Political party (or parties): for political parties involved in a political system to push for autonomy or secession.
  - Militant organization(s): for armed organizations.
  - Advocacy group(s): for non-belligerent, non-politically participatory entities.
  - Ethnic/ethno-religious/racial/regional/religious group(s).

== List ==
=== Albania ===
- League of Prizren
- Northern Epirus

=== Belgium ===
- Political parties
  - Flemish
    - Vlaams Belang, New Flemish Alliance
    - Sociaal-Liberale Partij member of the European Free Alliance

=== Bulgaria ===
- Militant organizations: Bulgarian Revolutionary Central Committee, Internal Revolutionary Organization, Internal Macedonian Revolutionary Organization

=== Czech Republic ===
- Political party: Young Czech Party, Czech National Social Party

=== Finland ===
- Political movement: Fennoman
- Political party: Finnish Party, Young Finnish Party
  - Rebel organization: Kagal
- Åland Islands
  - Political movement: Åland movement

=== France ===
- Basque Country (also in Spain)
  - Political parties: Basque Nationalist Party, Basque Unity, Patriot Unity
  - Rebel organization: Basque homeland and Freedom (ETA), Iparretarrak
- Corsica
  - Political parties: Corsica Nazione, Partitu di a Nazione Corsa
- Brittany
  - Political parties: Union Démocratique Bretonne, Breton Party
  - Rebel organization: Breton Revolutionary Army, Liberation Front of Brittany
- Alsace
  - Political parties : Alsace d'abord *

=== Germany ===
- Short-lived Republic: Rhenish Republic
- Lower Saxony
- Alemannic Separatism
- Bavarian Soviet Republic
- (Saar Protectorate) Saarland
  - Political parties: Christian People's Party of Saarland, Social Democratic Party of Saarland
  - Goals: De facto independence of Saarland under status of a European territory, acceptance of the Saar statute

=== Greece ===
(Gained independence from the Ottoman Empire after the Greek War of Independence)

- Society: Filiki Eteria
- Unrecognized state: Areopagus of Eastern Continental Greece, Peloponnesian Senate, Senate of Western Continental Greece, Provisional Administration of Greece (after 1822)
- Militant organizations: Armatoloi/Klephts, Sacred Band, Hellenic Army, Hellenic Navy
- Aromanians (Aromanian nationalism)
  - Samarina Republic, Principality of the Pindus

=== Ireland ===
(See also under UK, for pre-division Ireland)

- Home Rule League
- Irish National League
- Irish Parliamentary Party
- Irish Republican Brotherhood
- Provisional Government of the Irish Republic
- Sinn Féin
- Society of United Irishmen
- United Irish League
- Young Ireland

=== Italy ===
- Sardinia (Sardinian nationalism)
- Sicily (Sicilian nationalism)
- Veneto (Venetian nationalism)

=== North Macedonia ===
Albanian-inhabited communities in SR Macedonia and the Republic of Macedonia

- Ethnic group: Albanians
- Political parties: N/A
- Goals: Unification of Albanian-inhabited areas in western Macedonia with a proposed seventh Yugoslav republic Kosovo (1980s), autonomy or independence of Albanian-inhabited regions in western Macedonia (1990s)
- Events: Unofficial 1992 autonomy referendum, with 90 percent of Albanians voting and more than 99 percent being in favor
- Timespan: 1980s-1990s

Serbian-inhabited communities in the Republic of Macedonia

- Ethnic group: Serbs
- Political parties: Democratic Party of Serbs in Macedonia, Radical Party of the Serbs in Macedonia
- Goals: Autonomy (Serbian Autonomous Region of Kumanovo Valley and Skopska Crna Gora)
- Timespan: 1992

=== Ottoman Empire ===
- Ethnic group: Greeks
  - Organization: Filiki Eteria
- Ethnic group: Serbs
  - Organization: Serbian rebels
- Ethnic group: Bulgarians
  - Organization: Bulgarian revolutionaries, Opalchentsi

=== Poland ===
- Narodowa Demokracja
- Towarzystwo Demokratyczne Polskie (Polish Democratic Society)
- Union of Upper Silesians
- Silesian People's Party

=== Russian Empire ===
Armenia

- Armenian National Council

Azerbaijan

- Azerbaijani National Council

Bashkortostan

- Bashkir Regional Bureau
- Millät Mäclese

Belarus

- Belarusian National Council

Crimea

- Qurultay of the Crimean Tatar People

Don

- Krug for the Salvation of the Don

Estonia

- Estonian Provisional Government

Finland

- Parliament of Finland
- White Guard

Georgia

- Social Democratic Party of Georgia

Idel-Ural

- Collegium for the implementation of the Idel-Ural State

North Ingermanland

- Provisional Committee of Northern Ingria

Karelia

- Union of White Sea Karelians

Kuban

- Kuban Military Council
- Kuban Rada

Latvia

- People's Council of Latvia

Lithuania

- Council of Lithuania

Moldova

- Sfatul Țării

Mountainous Republic of the Northern Caucasus

- Union of the Peoples of the Northern Caucasus
- Executive Committee

Poland

- Regency Council
- Polish political parties

Transcaucasia

- Transcaucasian Commissariat

Ukraine

- Central Council of Ukraine
- General Secretariat of Ukraine

=== Slovakia ===
- Political party: Slovak National Party

=== Soviet Union ===
- Political parties:
- Azerbaijani Popular Front Party
- Belarusian People's Front
- Rahvarinne
- Popular Front of Latvia, Latvian National Independence Movement
- Sąjūdis
- Moldovan Popular Front
- People's Movement of Ukraine (Rukh)
- Organization of Ukrainian Nationalists
- Ukrainian Insurgent Army

=== Spain ===
- (Basque Country (autonomous community)) Basque Country (also in France)
  - Political parties: Aralar Party, Basque Nationalist Party, Batasuna, Eusko Abertzale Ekintza, Eusko Alkartasuna, Nafarroa Bai
  - Rebel organizations: Basque homeland and Freedom (ETA), SEGI
- Catalonia
  - Political parties: Convergence and Union (Democratic Convergence of Catalonia + Democratic Union of Catalonia), Republican Left of Catalonia, Catalan State, Popular Unity Candidacy, Democrats of Catalonia, Left Movement, Catalan Solidarity for Independence, Reagrupament, National Front of Catalonia
  - Rebel organizations: Terra Lliure (disbanded), Exèrcit Popular Català (disbanded)
  - Organizations: Assemblea Nacional Catalana, Òmnium Cultural
  - Labour unions: Intersindical-CSC, Coordinadora Obrera Sindical
- Galicia
  - Political Parties: Galician Nationalist Bloc, Nós-Unidade Popular
- Asturias
  - Political parties: Bloque por Asturies, Unidá Nacionalista Asturiana, Andecha Astur
  - Rebel organization: Andecha Obrera (disbanded)
- Canary Islands
  - Political party: Congreso Nacional de Canarias, Frepic-Awañak, Unión del Pueblo Canario
  - Organizations: MPAIAC
  - Armed groups: Fuerzas Armadas Guanches

=== Sweden ===
- Fennia
  - Ethnic Groups: Forest Finns, Tornedalians
  - Location: Värmland, Dalarna
  - Political movement: Forest Finn Autonomism/Nationalism

=== United Kingdom ===
- Cornwall: New Cornish Tertia army, An Gof, Cornish Solidarity
- Isle of Wight: Vectis National Party
- Ireland: Irish Republican Brotherhood, Clan na Gael, Young Ireland, Home Rule League, Irish Socialist Republican Party, Irish Parliamentary Party, All-for-Ireland League, Nationalist Party (Northern Ireland), Irish Independence Party
- Scotland: Scottish National Liberation Army
- Wales: Cymru Fydd, Cymru Goch, Welsh Socialist Alliance, Welsh Republican Movement

==== Isle of Man ====
- Isle of Man: Fo Halloo, Manx National Party

=== Yugoslavia ===
- Croatia (SR Croatia, SFR Yugoslavia)
- Ethnic group: Croats
- Political parties: Croatian Democratic Union, Croatian Party of Rights, Croatian Peasant Party
- Armed organizations: Croatian National Guard
- Events: Croatian Spring, War in Croatia
- Goals: Independence

Republic of Kosovo (AP Kosovo and Metohija, SR Serbia, FR Yugoslavia)

- Ethnic group: Albanians in Kosovo
- Political parties: Democratic League of Kosovo, Alliance for the Future of Kosovo, Democratic Party of Kosovo, National Movement for the Liberation of Kosovo, The People's Movement for Kosovo
- Armed organizations: Kosovo Liberation Army, Armed Forces of the Republic of Kosovo
- Events: Insurgency in Kosovo (1993–98), Kosovo War
- Goals: Larger autonomy (until 1989); Independence (1990–2003)

Preševo Valley (Serbia, FR Yugoslavia)

- Ethnic group: Albanians in southern Serbia
- Events: Insurgency in the Preševo Valley

== See also ==
- List of historical unrecognized states and dependencies
- List of active separatist movements recognized by intergovernmental organizations
- Lists of separatist movements
