= United Canarian People =

Political party in the Canary Islands

United Canarian People Pueblo Canario Unido
- Spokesperson: Fernando Sagaseta; Carlos Suárez
- Founded: 1977
- Dissolved: 1979
- Merged into: Canarian People's Union
- Ideology: Canarian nationalism Socialism; Anti-capitalism; Environmentalism; Canarian independence (some factions)
- Political position: Radical left
- Trade union affiliation: Sindicato Obrero Canario (SOC)

The Canarian United People (Spanish: Pueblo Canario Unido, PCU) was a left-wing nationalist political coalition operating in the Canary Islands. The party aim was self-determination for the islands and socialism. It was a coalition between various political parties and groups, with a communist, pro-independence or nationalist ideology. The coalition received the support of the MPAIAC.

== Members of the coalition ==
The political parties that formed the Coalition were:

- Communist Party of the Canary Islands (provisional) (PCC(p)), later called Party of the Canarian Revolution.
- Células Comunistas (CC)

== History ==
In the Spanish elections of 1977 PCU only presented a candidacy to the Province of Las Palmas, obtaining 17,717 votes (the third most voted list), but no representation.

In 1979 PCU was banned from participating in the general elections because it was considered and "anti-constitutional" candidacy. This led the organizations that formed the coalition to create a new movement: Canarian People's Union (UPC). UPC was joined by the Party of Communist Unification in the Canaries (PUCC), Socialist Party of the Canaries, Canarian Assembly and Canarian Nationalist Autonomous Confederation. A sector of PCU that was critical with the political direction of the coalition, which they considered that was moderating towards autonomist positions, left the PCC(p) and CC and formed a movement called Radicales de Base de PCU, that finally also joined UPC.

== Election results ==
=== Congress of Deputies ===
Year	Votes	Vote % (Canaries)	Vote % (Las Palmas)	Seats
1977	17,717	3.24%	6,25%	0

== See also ==
- Canarian nationalism
