= Communist Party of the Canary Islands (provisional) =

Defunct political party in the Canary Islands, Spain

Communist Party of the Canary Islands (provisional) Party of the Canarian Revolution Partido Comunista Canario-provisional Partido de la Revolución Canaria
- Leader: Gonzalo Angulo González
- Founded: 1973
- Dissolved: 1991
- Split from: PCE
- Merged into: Canarian United Left
- Ideology: Canarian nationalism Marxism-Leninism; Anti-capitalism; Antifascism
- Political position: Far-left
- National affiliation: None (1973-1977); United Canarian People (1977-1979); Canarian People's Union (1979-1986); United Canarian Left (1986-1991)
- Trade union affiliation: Sindicato Obrero Canario (SOC)
- Parliament of the Canary Islands (1983-1987): 1 / 60

Communist Party of the Canary Islands (provisional) (Spanish: Partido Comunista Canario-provisional, PCC(p)), later Party of the Canarian Revolution (Spanish: Partido de la Revolución Canaria), PRC) was a Marxist-Leninist and Canarian nationalist political party operating in the Canary Islands. The party aim was self-determination for the islands and socialism.

== History ==
The party was created by ex-members of the Communist Party of Spain-Communist Party of the Canaries (PCE-PCC) who opposed the reformist trend that ended being called "Eurocommunism" supported by the VIII Congress of the PCE. Another reason of the split were the different positions regarding the Canarian national question. In 1976 the party created the Sindicato Obrero Canario (SOC, Canarian Workers Union in English). Originally, the party was clandestine (like all other Anti-Francoist organizations), starting to act legally by 1977 and being fully legalized in 1979.

The party defended the creation of a "National-Popular Front" that would unite all the nationalist forces that rejected autonomism. Nonetheless, unlike the MPAIAC, the party did not consider independence an immediate objective, but rather one to achieve in a long-term and gradual struggle.

In 1977 PCC(p) founded, along with Communist Cells (CC), the coalition United Canarian People, that in 1979 became Canarian People's Union (UPC). UPC gained an MP in the legislative elections of 1979, Fernando Sagaseta, which was a member of CC. UPC also gained 29 local representatives in the local elections of 1979 and the mayoral elections of some municipalities, including the city of Las Palmas de Gran Canaria.

In the 80s the importance of the PCC(p) -now renamed Party of the Canarian Revolution- declined. In the Canarian elections of 1983 UPC gained 2 seats. One of the MPs was the leader of the PRC, Gonzalo Angulo González. In 1984 an internal crisis arose in the Canarian People's Union (UPC), leading to the de facto dissolution of the coalition (which would officially happen in 1986). During the 1984 crisis the PCC(p) was one of two the forces (the other one being the Canarian Party of the Popular Vanguard, and split of Communist Cells, led by the ex-MP Fernando Sagaseta) that opposed the dissolution of the coalition.

During 1985 and 1986 the party campaigned against the permanence of the Canary Islands in the North Atlantic Treaty Organization (NATO). After the NATO membership referendum of 1986 the party asked the Spanish government to declare the Canaries as an international neutral zone, since the "leave" option had won in the islands. The same year, the party joined United Canarian Left (ICU), the Canarian branch of the Spanish coalition United Left. ICU was a coalition of the Communist Party of the Canaries (PCC), the Communist Party of the Peoples of Spain and the Party of the Canarian Revolution itself. ICU won 2 seats in the Canarian Parliament in the elections of 1987. In 1991 ICU, Canarian Nationalist Assembly and Canarian Nationalist Left created Nationalist Canarian Initiative (ICAN). The party disappeared during the formation of ICAN.

== See also ==
- Canarian nationalism
