= GFP =

GFP may refer to:

== Organisations ==
- Gaelic Football Provence, a French Gaelic Athletic Association club
- Geheime Feldpolizei, the German secret military police during the Second World War
- French Group for the Study of Polymers and their Application, also called French Polymer Group, a French society for the promotion of polymer science

=== Politics ===
- GFP Ramdir Sena, a militant Hindu nationalist group in Nepal
- Goa Forward Party, a political party in Goa, India
- Great Fatherland Party, a Russian political party

== Science and technology ==
- Generic Framing Procedure, a multiplexing technique
- Greatest fixed point, in mathematics
- Green fluorescent protein
- Ground-fault protection, an electrical safety device
- General factor of personality, in personality psychology

== Other uses ==
- Generalized first-price auction
- Government-Furnished Property, a term of art for property furnished by the US Federal government to fulfill contract obligations under Federal Acquisition Regulations
