= Attempted assassination of Antonio Cubillo =

Failed assassination attempt on Antonio Cubillo by agents of Spanish police

- Location: 36°42′00″N 3°13′00″E; Algiers, Algeria
- Date: 5 April 1978; 08:01 (GMT)
- Target: Antonio Cubillo
- Attack type: Attempted murder
- Weapon: Knives
- Deaths: 0
- Injuries: 1
- Perpetrator: Mercenaries of the Spanish government

On 5 April 1978, a failed attempt was made to assassinate Antonio Cubillo by agents of the Spanish police services. The assassination attempt followed a secret meeting in February of that year in Tripoli, the capital of Libya, of an ad hoc Liberation Committee of the defunct Organization of African Unity (OAU), predecessor of the African Union, led by Algeria, which intended to send a Commission to the Canary Islands to oversee their "decolonization".

== Background ==
Between 13 and 18 February 1978, a so-called OAU Liberation Committee met in Tripoli, the composition of which is unknown in the absence of minutes of the meetings, which were secret. The Committee, according to a high-ranking Tanzanian military officer, had decided to support the Movement for the Independence and Self-determination of the Canaries Archipelago (MPAIAC), led by Antonio Cubillo, and to send a commission formed by Libya, Senegal, Nigeria and Guinea, in addition to Algeria, to supervise a "decolonization process" in the Canary Islands. The Committee would also have agreed, all at Cubillo's request, to raise the matter with the then secretary general of the OAU, William Eteki, although the OAU Council of Ministers refused to deal with the issue. Cubillo also intended to travel to New York City and present a resolution favorable to the independence of the archipelago before the United Nations General Assembly.

That Committee was in the specific interests of Algeria, which was thereby intended to divert attention from its political and economic problems. Two days after the meeting, Morocco and Mauritania withdrew their support for the Committee, also denying that the Canary Islands were African territory, as intended at the meeting.

For its part, the Congress of Deputies of Spain, in the session of 14 February 1978, with a vote against and at the proposal of all parliamentary groups, described the agreement of the Tripoli meeting as "interference in the internal affairs of Spain." Parties from across the parliamentary arc protested the interference and requested the planning of the military defense of the Canary Islands. Juan de Borbón, father of Juan Carlos I, had previously traveled to Libya to get Colonel Gaddafi to withdraw the support Cubillo had obtained from the Tripoli regime.

According to speculation in the newspaper Der Spiegel, the government of the Federal Republic of Germany would have assigned Werner Mauss, a special agent of the Lower Saxony police, to Las Palmas de Gran Canaria to obtain information from the MPAIAC. With this information he would have gone to Algiers to infiltrate the armed organization, although he would have been rejected. Even so, he would have remained in the city planning the murder.

== The attack ==
José Luis Espinosa Pardo, a former Servicio Central de Documentación (SECED) infiltrator of the Communist Party of Spain (Reconstituted) (PCE(r)) and the Revolutionary Antifascist Patriotic Front (FRAP), who had previously offered to support Cubillo, hired mercenaries Juan Antonio Alfonso González and José Luis Cortés to carry out the assassination. Both moved to Algiers on the morning of 5 April 1978. The two men were waiting in front of the elevator of Cubillo's residence on Peking Avenue in that city. Upon arrival in front of the elevator, he was stabbed twice by surprise, receiving serious injuries to the back and abdomen. The mercenaries were about to cut his neck when they were surprised by the abrupt arrival of an Algerian official, so they were forced to flee. Antonio Cubillo had to use crutches after the attack.

According to Cubillo in later interviews, he went to the hospital on his own, arriving in a timely manner because street traffic was light due to an important football match. He also relates that the then President of Algeria, Houari Boumédiène, was personally concerned about the matter and ordered the arrest without further cause of all the Spaniards who were in the capital and the withholding of their passports; that was how Cubillo recognized his attackers. The police chief came to the conclusion that they were Spaniards because "If they have not insulted him while stabbing him it is because they were not Algerians." Cubillo, once he returned to Madrid, would blame the operation on interior minister Rodolfo Martín Villa.

== Aftermath ==
The Algerian government concealed the attack on its protégé for several days, although the perpetrators of the attack were arrested on 5 April and sentenced to death by Boumédiène, but pardoned seven years later. These in turn declared after their release that they worked for José Luis Espinosa, whose whereabouts were unknown. However, on 22 October 1988, Espinosa was captured by the Spanish police forces and transferred to the provisional prison of Carabanchel under orders from the Audiencia Nacional. The matter also implicated the authorities and secret services of Lower Saxony for the involvement of agent Werner Mauss.

In 2003, the Audencia Nacional approved compensation of €150,253 for the terrorist action.

In 2009 Juan Antonio Alfonso apologized to Cubillo in a face-to-face meeting for a documentary.

== Popular culture ==
A year after the events, Jordi Sierra i Fabra published the novel En canarias se ha puesto el Sol ("The Sun has set in the Canary Islands"). This novel deals with a hypothetical wave of MPAIAC attacks, including the hijacking in Barcelona of a train loaded with plutonium and a massacre at the Santiago Bernabéu Stadium with several thousand dead, followed by the invasion of the Canary Islands by Algerian submarines. In the novel Cubillo dies, serving as a pretext for the invasion.

== See also ==
- State terrorism
