= Newry Bosco GFC =

- Cumann Naomh Eoin Bosco
- Founded: 1963
- County: Down
- Nickname: Bosco
- Colours: Yellow and Blue
- Grounds: Jack Mackin Park
- Coordinates: 54°10′54.58″N 6°20′42.42″W

Playing kits
Standard colours

Newry Bosco GFC are a Gaelic Athletic Association gaelic football club in Newry, County Armagh, Northern Ireland.

Although the club plays its home games at Jack Mackin Park which is in County Armagh, Bosco plays in the South Down league.

== Chronology ==
2014: G4MO Established

2011: Received: IRISH NEWS SPECIAL RECOGNITION AWARD

2010: IRISH NEWS CLUB OF THE YEAR as South Down Under 14 'B' League Champions

2009: All County Division 4 League Champions (promoted with a 100% league record going undefeated all season in the league)

2007:

- All County Junior Football Champions
- South Down Under 16 Football League
- All County Under 14 'B' Football Championship
- South Down Under 14 'B' Football Championship
- South Down Ladies Under 14 Football Championship

2005:

- South Down Under 12 'B' Football Championship

2004

- All County Senior Ladies Football Championship
- All County Senior Ladies Football League
- All County Under 14 Football League

2002:

- Ulster Under 17 Club Football Championship
- All County Minor Football Championship
- All County Minor Football League
- South Down Minor Football Championship
- South Down Under 12 'A' Football Championship
- All County Senior Ladies Football Championship (as Iveagh Bosco)
- All County Senior Ladies Football League (as Iveagh Bosco)

2001:

- All County Senior Ladies Football Championship (as Iveagh Bosco)
- All County Senior Ladies Football League (as Iveagh Bosco)
- All County Under 16 'A' Football Championship
- South Down Under 12 Football League
- South Down Under 11 Football League

1999:

- Ulster Intermediate Ladies Football Championship
- All County Senior Ladies Football Championship (as Iveagh Bosco)
- All County Senior Ladies Football League (as Iveagh Bosco)

1998:

- All County Senior Ladies Football Championship (as Iveagh Bosco)
- All County Senior Ladies Football League (as Iveagh Bosco)

1996: All County Intermediate Football Championship

1990: All County Senior Reserve Football Championship

1981:

- All County Under 12 'A' Football Championship
- South Down Under 12 'A' Football Championship

1980: South Down Under 12 'A' Football Championship

1975:

- All County Minor Football Championship
- South Down Minor Football League
- All County Under 16 'A' Football Championship
- South Down Under 16 'A' Football Championship
- South Down Under 16 Football League

1972: South Down Under 16 Football League

Successes per age group:

- All County Division 4 Champions 2009
- County Intermediate Championship 1996
- County Junior Championship 2007
- County Senior Reserve Championship 1990
- County Minor Championship 1975 and 2002
- County Minor League 2002
- South Down Minor League 1975 and 2002
- Ulster U17 Championship 2002
- County U16 Championship 1975 and 2001
- South Down Under 16 Championship 1975
- South Down U16 League 1972, 1975 and 2007
- County U14 League 2004
- County Under 14 'B' FC 2007
- South Down Under 14 'B' FC 2007
- South Down Under 14 'C' League 2010
- County U12 Championship 1981
- South Down U12 Championship 1980, 1981 and 2002
- South Down U12 'B' Championship 2005
- South Down U12 League 2001
- South Down U11 League 2001

== See also ==
- Down Senior Club Football Championship
- List of Gaelic Athletic Association clubs
