= 1979 Spanish local elections in the Canary Islands =

This article presents the results breakdown of the local elections held in the Canary Islands on 3 April 1979. The following tables show detailed results in the autonomous community's most populous municipalities, sorted alphabetically.

== City control ==
The following table lists party control in the most populous municipalities, including provincial capitals (highlighted in bold).

Municipality	Population	New control
Arona	12,740	Union of the Democratic Centre (UCD)
La Laguna	112,472	Spanish Socialist Workers' Party (PSOE)
**Las Palmas de Gran Canaria**	345,925	Canarian People's Union (UPC) (PSOE in 1980, UCD in 1982)
**Santa Cruz de Tenerife**	183,583	Union of the Democratic Centre (UCD) (ATI in 1983)
Telde	57,428	Neighbours' Assembly of Telde (AVT)

== Municipalities ==
=== Arona ===
Population: 12,740

Summary of the 3 April 1979 City Council of Arona election results →
Parties and alliances	Popular vote			Seats	
Parties and alliances	Votes	%	±pp	Total	+/−
Union of the Democratic Centre (UCD)	2,717	64.35	n/a	**13**	n/a
Independent Group of the Arona Municipality (GIMA)	571	13.52	n/a	**2**	n/a
Spanish Socialist Workers' Party (PSOE)	292	6.92	n/a	**1**	n/a
Canarian People's Union (UPC)	224	5.31	n/a	**1**	n/a
Communist Party of Spain (PCE)	207	4.90	n/a	0	n/a
Democratic Coalition (CD)	187	4.43	n/a	0	n/a
Workers' Revolutionary Organization (ORT)	24	0.57	n/a	0	n/a
Blank ballots	0	0.00	n/a		
**Total**	**4,222**			**17**	**n/a**
Valid votes	4,222	98.07	n/a		
Invalid votes	83	1.93	n/a		
**Votes cast / turnout**	**4,305**	**55.18**	**n/a**		
Abstentions	3,497	44.82	n/a		
**Registered voters**	**7,802**				

=== La Laguna ===
Population: 112,472

Summary of the 3 April 1979 City Council of La Laguna election results →
Parties and alliances	Popular vote			Seats	
Parties and alliances	Votes	%	±pp	Total	+/−
Union of the Democratic Centre (UCD)	12,792	43.64	n/a	**13**	n/a
Spanish Socialist Workers' Party (PSOE)	5,999	20.47	n/a	**6**	n/a
Canarian People's Union (UPC)	4,661	15.90	n/a	**4**	n/a
Laguneran Assembly Electors' Group (AEAL)	2,434	8.30	n/a	**2**	n/a
Communist Party of Spain (PCE)	1,547	5.28	n/a	**1**	n/a
Democratic Coalition (CD)	1,465	5.00	n/a	**1**	n/a
Workers' Revolutionary Organization (ORT)	414	1.41	n/a	0	n/a
Blank ballots	0	0.00	n/a		
**Total**	**29,312**			**27**	**n/a**
Valid votes	29,312	96.09	n/a		
Invalid votes	1,193	3.91	n/a		
**Votes cast / turnout**	**30,505**	**39.44**	**n/a**		
Abstentions	46,832	60.56	n/a		
**Registered voters**	**77,337**				

=== Las Palmas de Gran Canaria ===
Population: 345,925

Summary of the 3 April 1979 City Council of Las Palmas de Gran Canaria election results →
Parties and alliances	Popular vote			Seats	
Parties and alliances	Votes	%	±pp	Total	+/−
Union of the Democratic Centre (UCD)	50,900	43.06	n/a	**14**	n/a
Canarian People's Union (UPC)	34,775	29.42	n/a	**9**	n/a
Spanish Socialist Workers' Party (PSOE)	16,738	14.16	n/a	**4**	n/a
Neighbours' Assembly (AdeV)	6,994	5.92	n/a	**2**	n/a
Communist Party of Spain (PCE)	5,501	4.65	n/a	0	n/a
Party of the Canarian Country (PPC)	2,671	2.26	n/a	0	n/a
Workers' Revolutionary Organization (ORT)	576	0.49	n/a	0	n/a
Democratic Coalition (CD)	65	0.05	n/a	0	n/a
Blank ballots	0	0.00	n/a		
**Total**	**118,220**			**29**	**n/a**
Valid votes	118,220	97.79	n/a		
Invalid votes	2,668	2.21	n/a		
**Votes cast / turnout**	**120,888**	**56.73**	**n/a**		
Abstentions	92,196	43.27	n/a		
**Registered voters**	**213,084**				

=== Santa Cruz de Tenerife ===
Population: 183,583

Summary of the 3 April 1979 City Council of Santa Cruz de Tenerife election results →
Parties and alliances	Popular vote			Seats	
Parties and alliances	Votes	%	±pp	Total	+/−
Union of the Democratic Centre (UCD)	18,815	33.29	n/a	**10**	n/a
Canarian People's Union (UPC)	11,208	19.83	n/a	**6**	n/a
Spanish Socialist Workers' Party (PSOE)	10,700	18.93	n/a	**5**	n/a
Free Electoral Group of Tenerife (AL)	8,815	15.60	n/a	**4**	n/a
Communist Party of Spain (PCE)	3,805	6.73	n/a	**2**	n/a
Canarian Workers' Socialist Union (USOC)	2,669	4.72	n/a	0	n/a
Workers' Revolutionary Organization (ORT)	503	0.89	n/a	0	n/a
Blank ballots	0	0.00	n/a		
**Total**	**56,515**			**27**	**n/a**
Valid votes	56,515	97.31	n/a		
Invalid votes	1,564	2.69	n/a		
**Votes cast / turnout**	**58,079**	**46.58**	**n/a**		
Abstentions	66,618	53.42	n/a		
**Registered voters**	**124,697**				

=== Telde ===
Population: 57,428

Summary of the 3 April 1979 City Council of Telde election results →
Parties and alliances	Popular vote			Seats	
Parties and alliances	Votes	%	±pp	Total	+/−
Union of the Democratic Centre (UCD)	9,413	42.72	n/a	**11**	n/a
Neighbours' Assembly of Telde (AVT)	6,395	29.02	n/a	**7**	n/a
Communist Party of Spain (PCE)	2,561	11.62	n/a	**3**	n/a
Spanish Socialist Workers' Party (PSOE)	1,835	8.33	n/a	**2**	n/a
Independent Group of Telde (GIT)	1,662	7.54	n/a	**2**	n/a
Workers' Revolutionary Organization (ORT)	169	0.77	n/a	0	n/a
Blank ballots	0	0.00	n/a		
**Total**	**22,035**			**25**	**n/a**
Valid votes	22,035	97.61	n/a		
Invalid votes	540	2.39	n/a		
**Votes cast / turnout**	**22,575**	**66.97**	**n/a**		
Abstentions	11,132	33.03	n/a		
**Registered voters**	**33,707**				
