= Azarug =

- Leader: Collective leadership
- Founded: 1992
- Ideology: Canarian nationalism Socialism; Amazighism; Ecologism; Feminism; Antifascism

Party flag

Website
- azarug.org

Flag of Tknara proposed by Azarug

Azarug is a leftist youth organization of the Canary Islands founded in 1992 that seeks the independence of the archipelago.

It defines itself as a leftist revolutionary pro-independence organization. Its principles include anti-imperialism, anticapitalism, ecologism, antimilitarism and feminism, as well as the strengthening of Canarian culture and identity (la difusión, fortalecimiento y defensa de los valores que constituyen la Identidad Nacional Canaria) by promoting Amazighism.

It functions as an assembly-centered and horizontal organization, seeking to implement direct democracy and autogestion within its structure.

== History ==
Azarug was founded in Tenerife by uniting the youth wings of the National Congress of the Canaries (CNC) and the Popular Front of the Canary Islands (FREPIC-AWAÑAK), seeking to overcome the confrontation between these two political parties. Later members of other parties such as Izquierda Verde - Izegzawen joined Azarug. After the creation of a new island assembly in Gran Canaria the group became increasingly leftist, adding the socialist red star to its symbol.

Although it disagrees with some of the policies of Antonio Cubillo, since Azarug does not condemn the past violent policies of the MPAIAC, it is viewed by rightists as one of the groups that seek to minimize terrorism in the Canary Islands.

== See also ==
- Canarian nationalism
- List of active separatist movements in Africa
