= 1979 Canarian island council elections =

Elections in the Spanish region of the Canary Islands

Island council elections were held in the Canary Islands on 3 April 1979 to elect the 1st Island Councils (the cabildos insulares) of El Hierro, Fuerteventura, Gran Canaria, La Gomera, La Palma, Lanzarote and Tenerife. All 137 seats in the seven island councils were up for election. They were held concurrently with local elections all across Spain.

== Overall ==
Summary of the 3 April 1979 Canarian island council election results →
Parties and alliances	Popular vote			Seats	
Parties and alliances	Votes	%	±pp	Total	+/−
Union of the Democratic Centre (UCD)	247,180	48.61	n/a	79	n/a
Spanish Socialist Workers' Party (PSOE)	92,333	18.16	n/a	26	n/a
Canarian People's Union (UPC)	77,549	15.25	n/a	8	n/a
Communist Party of Spain (PCE)	28,363	5.58	n/a	4	n/a
Neighbours' Assembly (AV)	26,540	5.22	n/a	2	n/a
Democratic Coalition (CD)	15,422	3.03	n/a	2	n/a
Party of the Canarian Country (PPC)	6,970	1.37	n/a	0	n/a
Majorera Assembly (AM)	5,085	1.00	n/a	9	n/a
Workers' Revolutionary Organization (ORT)	2,519	0.50	n/a	0	n/a
Independent Herrenian Group (AHI)	1,680	0.33	n/a	6	n/a
Assembly Independent Party (PIT)	1,226	0.24	n/a	1	n/a
Independent Group (GI)	878	0.17	n/a	0	n/a
Blank ballots	2,718	0.53	n/a		
Total	508,463			137	n/a
Valid votes	508,463	98.27	n/a		
Invalid votes	8,968	1.73	n/a		
Votes cast / turnout	517,431	57.66	n/a		
Abstentions	379,914	42.34	n/a		
Registered voters	897,345				

Popular vote
UCD	48.61%
PSOE	18.16%
UPC	15.25%
PCE	5.58%
AV	5.22%
CD	3.03%
PPC	1.37%
AM	1.00%
AHI	0.33%
PIT	0.24%
Others	0.67%
Blank ballots	0.53%

Seats
UCD	57.66%
PSOE	18.98%
AM	6.57%
UPC	5.84%
AHI	4.38%
PCE	2.92%
AV	1.46%
CD	1.46%
PIT	0.73%

== Island control ==
The following table lists party control in the island councils.

Island	Population	New control
El Hierro	?	Independent Herrenian Group (AHI)
Fuerteventura	?	Majorera Assembly (AM)
Gran Canaria	?	Union of the Democratic Centre (UCD)
La Gomera	?	Union of the Democratic Centre (UCD) (AGI in 1983)
La Palma	?	Union of the Democratic Centre (UCD) (AP in 1983)
Lanzarote	?	Union of the Democratic Centre (UCD)
Tenerife	?	Union of the Democratic Centre (UCD) (ATI in 1983)

== Islands ==
=== El Hierro ===
Summary of the 3 April 1979 Island Council of El Hierro election results →
Parties and alliances	Popular vote			Seats	
Parties and alliances	Votes	%	±pp	Total	+/−
Independent Herrenian Group (AHI)	1,680	53.92	n/a	6	n/a
Union of the Democratic Centre (UCD)	1,401	44.96	n/a	5	n/a
Democratic Coalition (CD)	23	0.74	n/a	0	n/a
Blank ballots	12	0.39	n/a		
Total	3,116			11	n/a
Valid votes	3,116	99.58	n/a		
Invalid votes	13	0.42	n/a		
Votes cast / turnout	3,129	54.21	n/a		
Abstentions	2,643	45.79	n/a		
Registered voters	5,772				

=== Fuerteventura ===
Summary of the 3 April 1979 Island Council of Fuerteventura election results →
Parties and alliances	Popular vote			Seats	
Parties and alliances	Votes	%	±pp	Total	+/−
Majorera Assembly (AM)	5,085	49.54	n/a	9	n/a
Union of the Democratic Centre (UCD)	3,677	35.82	n/a	6	n/a
Democratic Coalition (CD)	921	8.97	n/a	1	n/a
Spanish Socialist Workers' Party (PSOE)	575	5.60	n/a	1	n/a
Blank ballots	7	0.07	n/a		
Total	10,265			17	n/a
Valid votes	10,265	99.57	n/a		
Invalid votes	44	0.43	n/a		
Votes cast / turnout	10,309	64.80	n/a		
Abstentions	5,601	35.20	n/a		
Registered voters	15,910				

=== Gran Canaria ===
Summary of the 3 April 1979 Island Council of Gran Canaria election results →
Parties and alliances	Popular vote			Seats	
Parties and alliances	Votes	%	±pp	Total	+/−
Union of the Democratic Centre (UCD)	119,217	47.46	n/a	17	n/a
Canarian People's Union (UPC)	50,998	20.30	n/a	5	n/a
Spanish Socialist Workers' Party (PSOE)	32,241	12.84	n/a	3	n/a
Neighbours' Assembly (AV)	26,540	10.57	n/a	2	n/a
Communist Party of Spain (PCE)	12,653	5.04	n/a	0	n/a
Party of the Canarian Country (PPC)	6,970	2.77	n/a	0	n/a
Democratic Coalition (CD)	1,226	0.49	n/a	0	n/a
Blank ballots	1,339	0.53	n/a		
Total	251,184			27	n/a
Valid votes	251,184	97.90	n/a		
Invalid votes	5,382	2.10	n/a		
Votes cast / turnout	256,566	68.44	n/a		
Abstentions	118,322	31.56	n/a		
Registered voters	374,888				

==== Distribution by constituency ====
Constituency	UCD		UPC		PSOE		AV	
Constituency	%	S	%	S	%	S	%	S
Guía de Gran Canaria	61.5	3	17.1	1	14.1	−	1.3	−
Las Palmas	45.4	3	25.2	1	13.9	1	6.3	−
Telde	46.1	3	7.0	−	8.9	−	29.1	1
Gran Canaria (at-large)	47.5	8	20.3	3	12.8	2	10.6	1
Total	47.5	17	20.3	5	12.8	3	10.6	2

=== La Gomera ===
Summary of the 3 April 1979 Island Council of La Gomera election results →
Parties and alliances	Popular vote			Seats	
Parties and alliances	Votes	%	±pp	Total	+/−
Union of the Democratic Centre (UCD)	3,748	48.96	n/a	9	n/a
Spanish Socialist Workers' Party (PSOE)	2,830	36.96	n/a	6	n/a
Communist Party of Spain (PCE)	976	12.75	n/a	2	n/a
Canarian People's Union (UPC)	91	1.19	n/a	0	n/a
Blank ballots	11	0.14	n/a		
Total	7,656			17	n/a
Valid votes	7,656	99.29	n/a		
Invalid votes	55	0.71	n/a		
Votes cast / turnout	7,711	43.94	n/a		
Abstentions	9,836	56.06	n/a		
Registered voters	17,547				

=== La Palma ===
Summary of the 3 April 1979 Island Council of La Palma election results →
Parties and alliances	Popular vote			Seats	
Parties and alliances	Votes	%	±pp	Total	+/−
Union of the Democratic Centre (UCD)	19,785	65.01	n/a	15	n/a
Spanish Socialist Workers' Party (PSOE)	6,218	20.43	n/a	4	n/a
Communist Party of Spain (PCE)	4,290	14.10	n/a	2	n/a
Blank ballots	141	0.46	n/a		
Total	30,434			21	n/a
Valid votes	30,434	98.57	n/a		
Invalid votes	442	1.43	n/a		
Votes cast / turnout	30,876	53.69	n/a		
Abstentions	26,628	46.31	n/a		
Registered voters	57,504				

==== Distribution by constituency ====
Constituency	UCD		PSOE		PCE	
Constituency	%	S	%	S	%	S
Los Llanos de Aridane	72.0	4	15.9	1	11.8	−
Santa Cruz de La Palma	58.9	3	24.4	1	16.1	1
La Palma (at-large)	65.0	8	20.4	2	14.1	1
Total	65.0	15	20.4	4	14.1	2

=== Lanzarote ===
Summary of the 3 April 1979 Island Council of Lanzarote election results →
Parties and alliances	Popular vote			Seats	
Parties and alliances	Votes	%	±pp	Total	+/−
Union of the Democratic Centre (UCD)	9,777	56.39	n/a	11	n/a
Spanish Socialist Workers' Party (PSOE)	4,141	23.88	n/a	5	n/a
Assembly Independent Party (PIT)	1,226	7.07	n/a	1	n/a
Independent Group (GI)	878	5.06	n/a	0	n/a
Canarian People's Union (UPC)	669	3.86	n/a	0	n/a
Communist Party of Spain (PCE)	608	3.51	n/a	0	n/a
Blank ballots	40	0.23	n/a		
Total	17,339			17	n/a
Valid votes	17,339	99.13	n/a		
Invalid votes	152	0.87	n/a		
Votes cast / turnout	17,491	58.22	n/a		
Abstentions	12,554	41.78	n/a		
Registered voters	30,045				

=== Tenerife ===
Summary of the 3 April 1979 Island Council of Tenerife election results →
Parties and alliances	Popular vote			Seats	
Parties and alliances	Votes	%	±pp	Total	+/−
Union of the Democratic Centre (UCD)	89,575	47.53	n/a	16	n/a
Spanish Socialist Workers' Party (PSOE)	46,328	24.58	n/a	7	n/a
Canarian People's Union (UPC)	25,791	13.68	n/a	3	n/a
Democratic Coalition (CD)	13,252	7.03	n/a	1	n/a
Communist Party of Spain (PCE)	9,836	5.22	n/a	0	n/a
Workers' Revolutionary Organization (ORT)	2,519	1.34	n/a	0	n/a
Blank ballots	1,168	0.62	n/a		
Total	188,469			27	n/a
Valid votes	188,469	98.49	n/a		
Invalid votes	2,880	1.51	n/a		
Votes cast / turnout	191,349	48.36	n/a		
Abstentions	204,330	51.64	n/a		
Registered voters	395,679				

==== Distribution by constituency ====
Constituency	UCD		PSOE		UPC		CD	
Constituency	%	S	%	S	%	S	%	S
Granadilla	65.2	2	18.0	−	4.5	−	6.9	−
Icod	55.8	2	22.9	−	7.1	−	4.2	−
La Laguna	46.9	2	24.0	1	14.6	−	7.9	−
La Orotava	47.2	2	32.7	1	8.5	−	7.5	−
Santa Cruz	40.5	1	23.1	1	20.4	1	7.0	−
Tenerife (at-large)	47.5	7	24.6	4	13.7	2	7.0	1
Total	47.5	16	24.6	7	13.7	3	7.0	1
