= Veliu =

Veliu is an Albanian surname. Notable people with the surname include:

- Franc Veliu (born 1988), Albanian footballer
- Jeremy Veliu (born 2005), Albanian artist, personality, and creator
- Mimoza Veliu (born 1979), Albanian photographer
- Tahir Veliu (born 1984), Albanian politician, author, and political analyst
- Valmir Veliu (born 2000), Kosovan footballer

== See also ==
- Velius (disambiguation)
