= 1983 Spanish local elections in the Canary Islands =

This article presents the results breakdown of the local elections held in the Canary Islands on 8 May 1983. The following tables show detailed results in the autonomous community's most populous municipalities, sorted alphabetically.

== City control ==
The following table lists party control in the most populous municipalities, including provincial capitals (highlighted in bold). Gains for a party are highlighted in that party's colour.

Municipality	Population	Previous control	New control
Arona	13,556	Union of the Democratic Centre (UCD)	Spanish Socialist Workers' Party (PSOE)
La Laguna	106,146	Spanish Socialist Workers' Party (PSOE)	Spanish Socialist Workers' Party (PSOE)
**Las Palmas de Gran Canaria**	360,098	Union of the Democratic Centre (UCD)	Spanish Socialist Workers' Party (PSOE)
**Santa Cruz de Tenerife**	185,899	Tenerife Group of Independents (ATI)	Tenerife Group of Independents (ATI)
Telde	62,509	Canarian Assembly (AC)	Canarian Assembly (AC)

== Municipalities ==
=== Arona ===
Population: 13,556

← Summary of the 8 May 1983 City Council of Arona election results →
Parties and alliances	Popular vote			Seats	
Parties and alliances	Votes	%	±pp	Total	+/−
Democratic and Social Centre (CDS)	1,936	35.78	New	**6**	+6
Spanish Socialist Workers' Party (PSOE)	1,794	33.15	+26.23	**6**	+5
People's Coalition (AP–PDP–UL)^{1}	837	15.47	+11.04	**3**	+3
Tenerife Group of Independents (ATI)	441	8.15	New	**1**	+1
Communist Party of the Canaries (PCC–PCE)	403	7.45	+2.55	**1**	+1
Union of the Democratic Centre (UCD)	n/a	n/a	−64.35	0	−13
Independent Group of the Arona Municipality (GIMA)	n/a	n/a	−13.52	0	−2
Canarian People's Union (UPC)	n/a	n/a	−5.31	0	−1
Blank ballots	0	0.00	±0.00		
**Total**	**5,411**			**17**	**±0**
Valid votes	5,411	99.94	+1.87		
Invalid votes	3	0.06	−1.87		
**Votes cast / turnout**	**5,414**	**62.60**	**+7.42**		
Abstentions	3,234	37.40	−7.42		
**Registered voters**	**8,648**				
Sources
Footnotes: ^{1} People's Coalition results are compared to Democratic Coalition totals in the 1979 election.

=== La Laguna ===
Population: 106,146

← Summary of the 8 May 1983 City Council of La Laguna election results →
Parties and alliances	Popular vote			Seats	
Parties and alliances	Votes	%	±pp	Total	+/−
Spanish Socialist Workers' Party (PSOE)	17,778	46.34	+25.87	**15**	+9
People's Coalition (AP–PDP–UL)^{1}	6,878	17.93	+12.93	**5**	+4
Tenerife Group of Independents (ATI)	5,648	14.72	New	**4**	+4
Canarian People's Union–Canarian Assembly (UPC–AC)	4,645	12.11	−3.79	**3**	−1
Democratic and Social Centre (CDS)	1,385	3.61	New	0	±0
Communist Party of the Canaries (PCC–PCE)	992	2.59	−2.69	0	−1
Workers' Socialist Party (PST)	644	1.68	New	0	±0
Seven Green Stars (SEV)	395	1.03	New	0	±0
Union of the Democratic Centre (UCD)	n/a	n/a	−43.64	0	−13
Laguneran Assembly Electors' Group (AEAL)	n/a	n/a	−8.30	0	−2
Blank ballots	0	0.00	±0.00		
**Total**	**38,365**			**27**	**±0**
Valid votes	38,365	98.03	+1.94		
Invalid votes	772	1.97	−1.94		
**Votes cast / turnout**	**39,137**	**57.02**	**+17.58**		
Abstentions	29,506	42.98	−17.58		
**Registered voters**	**68,643**				
Sources
Footnotes: ^{1} People's Coalition results are compared to Democratic Coalition totals in the 1979 election.

=== Las Palmas de Gran Canaria ===
Population: 360,098

← Summary of the 8 May 1983 City Council of Las Palmas de Gran Canaria election results →
Parties and alliances	Popular vote			Seats	
Parties and alliances	Votes	%	±pp	Total	+/−
Spanish Socialist Workers' Party (PSOE)	56,041	43.24	+29.08	**15**	+11
People's Coalition (AP–PDP–UL)^{1}	40,507	31.25	+31.20	**10**	+10
Canarian People's Union–Canarian Assembly (UPC–AC)^{2}	9,593	7.40	−27.94	**2**	−9
Communist Party of the Canaries (PCC–PCE)	8,133	6.27	+1.62	**2**	+2
Liberal Canarian Party (PCL)	5,190	4.00	New	0	±0
Democratic and Social Centre (CDS)	4,518	3.49	New	0	±0
Party of the Canarian Country (PPC)	4,356	3.36	+1.10	0	±0
Assembly (Tagoror)	653	0.50	New	0	±0
Popular Struggle Coalition (CLP)	620	0.48	New	0	±0
Union of the Democratic Centre (UCD)	n/a	n/a	−43.06	0	−14
Blank ballots	0	0.00	±0.00		
**Total**	**129,611**			**29**	**±0**
Valid votes	129,611	96.77	−1.02		
Invalid votes	4,322	3.23	+1.02		
**Votes cast / turnout**	**133,933**	**55.14**	**−1.59**		
Abstentions	108,964	44.86	+1.59		
**Registered voters**	**242,897**				
Sources
Footnotes: ^{1} People's Coalition results are compared to Democratic Coalition totals in the 1979 election.; ^{2} Canarian People's Union–Canarian Assembly results are compared to the combined totals of Canarian People's Union and Neighbours' Assembly in the 1979 election.

=== Santa Cruz de Tenerife ===
Population: 185,899

← Summary of the 8 May 1983 City Council of Santa Cruz de Tenerife election results →
Parties and alliances	Popular vote			Seats	
Parties and alliances	Votes	%	±pp	Total	+/−
Tenerife Group of Independents (ATI)	40,445	53.78	New	**16**	+16
Spanish Socialist Workers' Party (PSOE)	17,912	23.82	+4.89	**7**	+2
People's Coalition (AP–PDP–UL)	9,901	13.17	New	**4**	+4
Canarian People's Union–Canarian Assembly (UPC–AC)	2,740	3.64	−16.19	0	−6
Communist Party of the Canaries (PCC–PCE)	2,197	2.92	−3.81	0	−2
Workers' Socialist Party (PST)	767	1.02	New	0	±0
Democratic and Social Centre (CDS)	652	0.87	New	0	±0
Seven Green Stars (SEV)	589	0.78	New	0	±0
Union of the Democratic Centre (UCD)	n/a	n/a	−33.29	0	−10
Free Electoral Group of Tenerife (AL)	n/a	n/a	−15.60	0	−4
Blank ballots	0	0.00	±0.00		
**Total**	**75,203**			**27**	**±0**
Valid votes	75,203	98.29	+0.98		
Invalid votes	1,310	1.71	−0.98		
**Votes cast / turnout**	**76,513**	**59.77**	**+13.19**		
Abstentions	51,496	40.23	−13.19		
**Registered voters**	**128,009**				

=== Telde ===
Population: 62,509

← Summary of the 8 May 1983 City Council of Telde election results →
Parties and alliances	Popular vote			Seats	
Parties and alliances	Votes	%	±pp	Total	+/−
Canarian Assembly (AC)	10,135	38.95	+9.93	**11**	+4
People's Coalition (AP–PDP–UL)	7,485	28.77	New	**8**	+8
Spanish Socialist Workers' Party (PSOE)	3,545	13.62	+5.29	**3**	+1
Communist Party of the Canaries (PCC–PCE)	2,661	10.23	−1.39	**2**	−1
Liberal Canarian Party (PCL)	1,506	5.79	New	**1**	+1
Democratic and Social Centre (CDS)	688	2.64	New	0	±0
Union of the Democratic Centre (UCD)	n/a	n/a	−42.72	0	−11
Independent Group of Telde (GIT)	n/a	n/a	−7.54	0	−2
Blank ballots	0	0.00	±0.00		
**Total**	**26,020**			**25**	**±0**
Valid votes	26,020	97.54	−0.07		
Invalid votes	657	2.46	+0.07		
**Votes cast / turnout**	**26,019**	**66.68**	**−0.29**		
Abstentions	13,333	33.32	+0.29		
**Registered voters**	**40,010**				

== See also ==
- 1983 Canarian regional election
