= Ibrahim Elgarhi =

Ebrahim Elgarhi
- ابراهيم الجارحي
- Born: 9 November 1975
- Occupations: Journalist and TV anchor
- Known for: TV, Facebook
- Children: 2 daughters
- Awards: Radio For Peacebuilding Africa award 2006
- Website: http://www.ibrahim-elgarhi.com

Ibrahim Elgarhi (born November 1975) is an Egyptian Journalist and TV and radio anchor. He is part of the Union of State Supporters group's administration.

== Personal life ==
Ibrahim Elgarhi graduated from the Faculty of Law at Mansoura University in 2000. He is married and has two daughters.

== Career ==
Ibrahim Elgarhi worked as a caricaturist in the Egyptian newspaper Al Wafd the year he graduated for one and a half years. He then moved among newspapers including Sout Al Omma, Al Ghadd, and Al Ahali.

In 2003, Elgarhi joined the Arabic service of BBC, where he worked as an editor on its Arabic website, then as a director, presenter and reporter on Arabic Radio from a number of countries, including Algeria, Sudan and Ghana.

In 2006, BBC Humanitarian Aid sent Elgarhi to Darfur, Sudan to lead the team in the production of programs for refugees in the stricken region. Their program Draw your Place on the Ground was awarded with Radio For Peace-building Africa Award.

At the beginning of 2008, Elgarhi founded Teet Radio, the first free Egyptian radio station. The station was successful throughout its broadcasting period of three years, during which hundreds of critical episodes were broadcast.

In 2009, Elgarhi moved to ONTV as editor in chief of the newsroom, however, he left that position after less than one year to join the Arabic team of Thomson Reuters, where he worked as a journalist and editor of Arabic news.

== Shows ==
In 2013, Ibrahim Elgarhi started his program Garhi Show on the internet, and then on ONTV. The show is aired weekly at 10 pm on Saturdays. Elgarhi also presented a program on Mega FM Radio station in 2014 Citizen Garhi, which he ceased after a few months in solidarity with the rights of his fellow journalists at the station.

Elgarhi is considered one of the most prominent bloggers on the social media networks where he is followed by hundreds of thousands.

== Writings ==
Elgarhi has three published books, namely; Haret Dabaa – Dabaa Alley (Novel), Parachute (Travel Literature), and Morsi #Quessa_Quassira_Hazine – Morsi #A_Sad_Short_Story (Historic Literature).
