= Velius =

Velius may refer to:

- Norbertas Vėlius (1938–1996), Lithuanian folklorist
- Velius Longus, 2nd-century Latin grammarian
- Caspar Ursinus Velius (1493–1539), German humanist

== See also ==
- Veliu, a surname
