= Secundino Delgado =

Canarian journalist and politician (1867–1912)

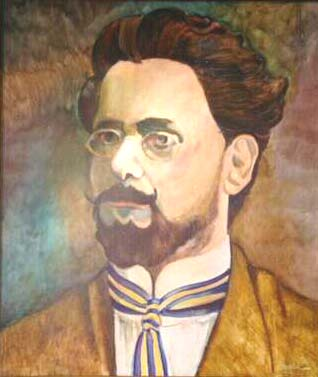
- Painting of Delgado
- Born: Secundino Delgado Rodríguez; 5 October 1867; Santa Cruz de Tenerife, Canary Islands, Spain
- Died: 4 May 1912 (aged 44); Santa Cruz de Tenerife, Canary Islands, Spain
- Citizenship: Spanish (1867–1881); American (1881–1900); Cuban (1900–1912)
- Occupations: Journalist, politician
- Political party: Federal Democratic Republican Party
- Other political affiliations: Autonomist People's Party
- Movement: Anarcho-syndicalism, Canarian nationalism
- Spouse: Mary Tifft
- Children: Secundino Delgado Trifft; Lila Delgado Trifft
- Parents: Secundino Delgado del Castillo (father); María Rodríguez Hernández (mother)

Secundino Delgado Rodríguez (1867–1912) was a Canarian journalist and politician, considered by some to be the father of Canarian nationalism.

== Biography ==
Secundino Delgado was born on the Canary Island of Tenerife, in 1867. He grew up during a period when a large proportion of Canarians (about one quarter) were emigrating to the Americas. In 1881, he emigrated to the United States where he met and married Mary Tifft, with whom he had two children, and was naturalised as a US citizen. He lived Florida and worked in Tampa's tobacco industry, within which he joined the growing anarcho-syndicalist movement. In 1894, he became editor-in-chief of the anarchist newspaper El Esclavo. He was arrested his involvement in organising a strike action and for his writings in support of anarchism and Cuban independence, which together informed his developing perspective of Canarian nationalism.

When the Cuban War of Independence broke out, Delgado went to Cuba to support the liberation movement, but was soon forced to leave after he was accused of bombing a Spanish military base in Havana. In 1896, he and his family moved to the Canary Islands, but they were again forced to move on after Delgado came to the attention of colonial governor Valeriano Weyler. In 1897, they moved to Venezuela, where Delgado met up with other Canarian emigrants and established the Canarian nationalist newspaper El Guanche, in which he criticised the waning Spanish Empire and called for an anti-colonial insurrection in the Canary Islands. As the newspaper was funded by the Canarian petty bourgeoisie, Delgado toned down his anarchist ideology and emphasised Canarian nationalism as an ideology to unite Canarian workers and small business owners. El Guanche was never distributed in the Canary Islands, but was widely read among the Canarian diaspora in Venezuela, causing tensions between Canarians and other Spanish expatriates. After two years of publication, the Venezuelan government censored the paper, under pressure from Spain, and Delgado was exiled to Curaçao.

After the establishment of a United States Military Government in Cuba, Delgado began to fear a US invasion of the Canary Islands, which led him to temper his criticisms of Spain. After staying in Cuba for a brief time and becoming a Cuban citizen, in 1900, he returned to the Canary Islands. Back on his home island of Tenerife, he established a trade union and an autonomist political party, in collaboration with anarchists and liberals. After his party failed to win seats in the 1901 Spanish general election, Delgado joined the Federal Democratic Republican Party, within which he continued to advocate for workers' rights and Canarian autonomy. The following year, the Minister of War Valeriano Weyler demanded Delgado be imprisoned for the Havana bombing in 1896. Although Delgado insisted he was innocent, he was taken to Madrid and kept in prison for 11 months. In 1903, he was released following intervention by the United States embassy, which had pointed out that Delgado was a Cuban citizen, not a Spanish one.

Aided by the republican politician Nicolás Estévanez and the anarchist activist Fermín Salvochea, Delgado returned to Tenerife, where he began working for the Canarian left-wing newspaper Vacaguaré. Unable to overtly advocate for Canarian independence or anarchism, under the surveillance of the Spanish state, Delgado advocated instead for Canarian self-governance and workers' self-management, which were considered acceptable political proposals under the Bourbon Restoration. He increasingly expressed goodwill towards sympathetic Spanish thought leaders and criticised the native Canarian ruling class for perpetuating Spanish colonialism. He also began to consider Canarian identity within the broader context of Hispanidad, while keeping it distinct from Spanish identity. In 1904, he released his autobiography, which was published in Mexico to avoid Spanish censorship. The following year, he traveled to Argentina and Uruguay, where he visited local Canarian communities. He also briefly lived in Mexico and Cuba until 1910, when he finally returned to Tenerife. Both his children died shortly after his return. In 1912, Delgado died from tuberculosis in Santa Cruz de Tenerife.

== Political thought ==
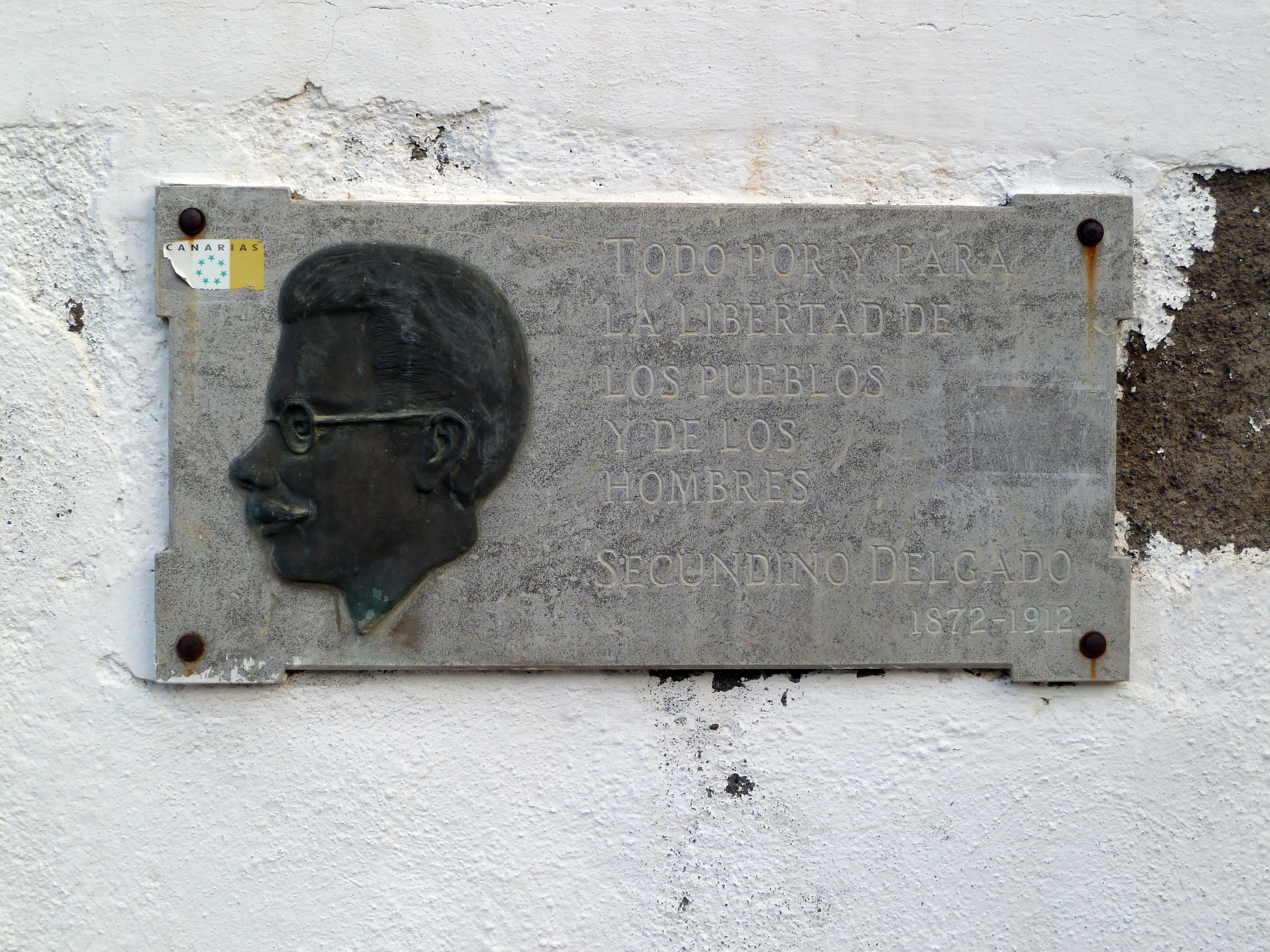
Plaque commemorating Delgado, citing his motto "Todo por y para la libertad de los pueblos y de los hombres" (English: All for the freedom of peoples and men)

Delgado's conception of Canarian nationalism was transnational and cosmopolitan, inspired by his travels and the dispersion of the Canarian diaspora throughout the Americas. Delgado's nationalism was an anti-colonial rather than ethnonationalist ideology, eschewing the idea of a unified ethnicity and instead centreing the shared class conditions of Canarian people. Delgado saw Canarians as a subaltern and considered the Spanish identity to be inherently hegemonic. He encouraged modern Canarians to emulate their Guanche ancestors and fight against Spanish colonialism; to Delgado, being Guanche meant being a rebel.

Delgado recognised his own Spanish heritage and often referred to himself as a settler colonist, while also refusing to consciously self-identify as Spanish. He viewed Canarian identity within the context of Hispanidad, in which Spaniards had an "illegitimate pretension to rule all Hispanic territories", including the Canary Islands and Cuba. Delgado thus identified Canarians as an "equal and independent" part of the Hispanic family, highlighting the commonalities between Hispanic peoples oppressed by Spanish colonialism and native Spaniards oppressed by the Spanish state.

Delgado's synthesis of anarchism and Canarian nationalism was inspired by Mikhail Bakunin, who advocated for social revolution while also supporting anti-imperialism. In his autobiography, Delgado described himself as "a revolutionary but never a partisan. Words also enslave, even the words republic, socialism, anarchy. No, I am just a revolutionary, a rebel – no more than that."

== See also ==
- Independence anarchism

== Bibliography ==
- Galián, Laura (2020). "Mediterranean Anarchist Meeting: The Unresolved Postcolonial Question". Colonialism, Transnationalism, and Anarchism in the South of the Mediterranean. Palgrave Macmillan. pp. 55–89. doi:10.1007/978-3-030-45449-4_3. ISBN 978-3-030-45448-7.
- Galván Álvarez, Enrique (2014). "The Haunted Island-Nation: Irish Intersections in Canary Islands Narratives". Revista Canaria de Estudios Ingleses (68): 27–42. ISSN 0211-5913.
- Galván-Álvarez, Enrique (2017). "Anarchism and the Anti-Colonial Canarian Imagination: the Missing Flag". History Workshop Journal. 83 (1): 253–271. doi:10.1093/hwj/dbx023.
- Shaffer, Kirk (2011). "Tropical Libertarians: Anarchist Movements And Networks In The Caribbean, Southern United States, And Mexico, 1890s–1920s". Anarchism and Syndicalism in the Colonial and Postcolonial World, 1870-1940. Brill. pp. 273–320. doi:10.1163/ej.9789004188495.i-432.80. ISBN 978-90-04-18849-5.
- Westphal, Bertrand (2010). "The Canaries". In Cabo Aseguinolaza, Fernando; Domínguez, César; Abuín González, Anxo (eds.). A Comparative History of Literatures in the Iberian Peninsula. Vol. 1. John Benjamins Publishing Company. ISBN 9789027288394.
