= Intersindical Canaria =

- Founded: 1994
- Headquarters: Av. Los Menceyes, 210. La Higuerita. La Laguna
- Location: Spain
- Members: 1,200 labor delegates (12% of the total)
- Affiliations: World Federation of Trade Unions
- Website: intersindicalcanaria.com

Intersindical Canaria is a left-wing nationalist trade union movement in the Canary Islands.

== History ==
Intersindical Canaria was founded in 1994, through the merger of Confederación Autónoma Nacionalista de Canarias (CANC), Sindicato Obrero de Canarias (SOC), Confederación Canaria de Trabajadores (CCT), Sindicato de Trabajadores de la Enseñanza de Canarias (STEC, teachers' union) and Sindicato Canario de la Salud (health care union). The organization advocates independence of the Canary Islands from Spain. It has a socialist and feminist profile. Intersindical Canaria joined the World Federation of Trade Unions in the period of 2006-2010.

The organization held its fourth congress in La Laguna in October 2009. In 2017 Aisha Hernández, a member of the union, was jailed after an altercation with the police when he made a graffiti that read "75% youth unemployment". The case has been very controversial.

== See also ==
- Canarian nationalism
- List of active separatist movements in Africa
