= Serb Civic Initiative =

Serb Civic Initiative, or Serbian Civic Initiative, or Civic Initiative Serbia may refer to:

- Civic Initiative Serbia, the initial name (2004-2005) of the Serbian Democratic Party of Kosovo and Metohija
- Civic Initiative Serbia, Democracy, Justice - political organization founded in 2009 and led by Oliver Ivanović, that registered for 2013 elections under the changed name: Civic Initiative Freedom, Democracy, Justice.
- Civic Initiative Serbia, initial name of the political alliance founded in 2013, that changed its name into Civic Initiative Srpska, and was transformed in 2014 into the Serb List (Kosovo)

== See also ==
- Serb List
