= Destacamentos Armados Canarios =

The Destacamentos Armados Canarios (Canarian Armed Detachments) (DAC) were a Canarian terrorist organization within the Movement for the Self-Determination and Independence of the Canary Archipelago (MPAIAC), which acted during the 1970s pursuing independence of the Canary Islands from Spain and alignment with Algeria.

== History ==
It emerged in 1978 as a reorganization of the Fuerzas Armadas Guanches, after several of its members had been imprisoned. The DAC was mainly made up of minors.

Their actions included writing on large bills "Canarias libre, fuera españoles" and changing them, demanding the freedom of MPAIAC prisoners. They also used armed struggle, placing bombs at the Gran Canaria Airport and the Port of Las Palmas, as well as at the police headquarters of Gran Canaria, the recruitment center of Las Palmas and at the Spanish police confederation. The DAC took control of a radio station in Las Palmas, holding a hostage in exchange for money.
