= Kastriot Berissa =

Albanian politician, author and political analyst

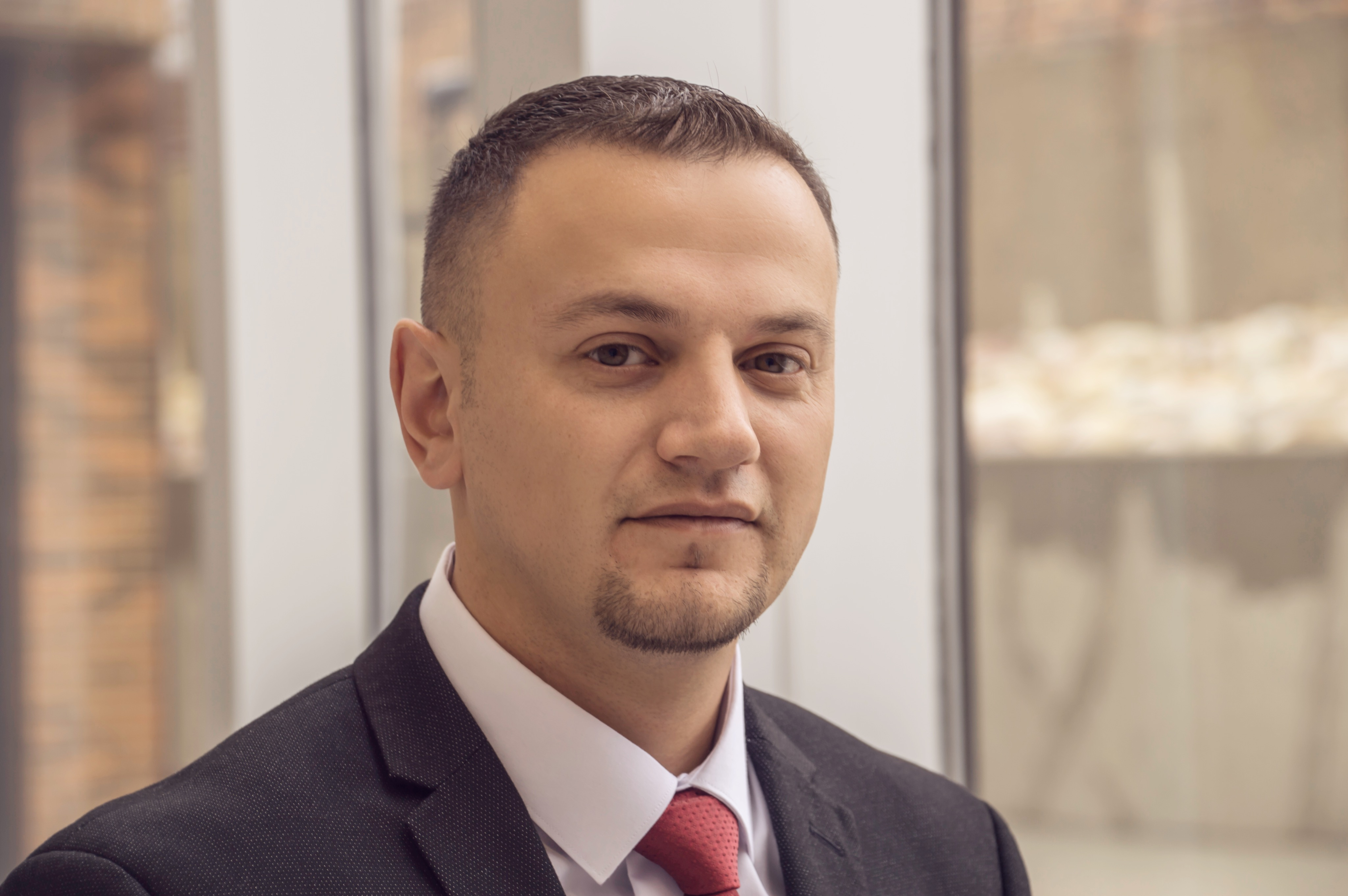

President of the Movement for United Albania
- Incumbent
- Assumed office 16 July 2016
- Preceded by: Post established

Personal details
- Born: Tahir Veliu; 19 February 1984 (age 42) Glogovac, SFR Yugoslavia
- Resting place: Tirana, Albania
- Party: Movement for United Albania
- Profession: Politician, author and political analyst

Kastriot Berissa (born Tahir Veliu; born 19 February 1984) and formerly as Kastriot Berishaj, is an Albanian politician, author and political analyst. He is leader of the nationalist Movement for United Albania and the author of the book "Platforma për Shqipëri të Bashkuar" (The Platform for United Albania).

== Political life ==
On 16 July 2016, Berissa was elected as the president of the Movement for United Albania, following its founding convention held in Pristina.

Because of his activities in all of Albanian territories, on 7 August 2016, he was declared as persona non grata in Serbia. Likewise, on 13 August 2016, he was banned from entering Greece. Veliu was arrested by the Greek authorities and subsequently deported to the border crossing of Kakavija, as he is considered a threat to Greece, because of his extremist political views on uniting the Albanian and foreign territories into a single Greater Albanian state.

On 6 June 2017, he was arrested by the Albanian Police at the Albania-Kosovo border and is currently facing charges of burning foreign flags, igniting national hatred, distribution of unconstitutional printed material, and creation of unconstitutional parties & associations.

On 11 July 2017, the court of Tirana, deemed Veliu's Movement for United Albania to be legal according to the constitution of the Republic of Albania, which recognizes the right to national unification as a legitimate and constitutional right.

Tahir Veliu considered his full birth name to be an unwanted "imposition" of Turkish culture on Albanians from the Ottoman era and in April 2018, he announced that his name and surname was changed to Kastriot Berishaj.

In 2018, he after changing the full name had an assassination attempt, but escaped and moved to Canada and changed his surname from Berishaj to Berissa.

== Published titles ==
- Veliu, Tahir (2016). Platforma për Shqipëri të Bashkuar (The Platform for United Albania). Shqipëria e Bashkuar.AL. ISBN 9780994809803.
