= Natural Albania =

Political party in Albania

Natural Albania Shqiperia Natyrale
- Leader: Koço Danaj
- Founded: 2010
- Headquarters: Tirana
- Ideology: Albanian nationalism Kosovar–Albanian unionism

Website
- www.shqiperianatyrale.org

Natural Albania (Albanian: Shqiperia Natyrale) is a nationalist political party in Albania created in 2010 by Koço Danaj. The main objective of the party is to propose a pacific solution to establish Greater Albania. The idea of unification has roots in the events of the Treaty of London in 1913, when roughly half of the predominantly Albanian territories and 40% of the population were left outside the new country's border.
