= Serb List =

Serb List may refer to the following political parties or alliances:

- Serb List (2006), defunct, now New Serb Democracy political party in Montenegro
- Serb List (2012), nationalist extra-parliamentary political party in Montenegro
- Serb List (Kosovo), Serbian ethnic minority political party in Kosovo
