= Movement for United Albania =

The Movement for United Albania Lëvizja për Shqipëri të Bashkuar
- President: Kastriot Berishaj
- Founder: Kastriot Berishaj
- Founded: July 16, 2016
- Headquarters: Tirana, Albania
- Ideology: Ultranationalism; Albanian irredentism Right-wing populism
- Political position: Far-right
- Slogan: "Një Komb, Një Shtet - Shqipëria e Bashkuar" (One Nation, One State - United Albania.)

Election symbol
- LSHB

Website
- www.levizjalshb.com

The Movement for United Albania (Albanian: Lëvizja për Shqipëri të Bashkuar) is an irredentist and nationalist political movement in Albania.

== History ==
On July 16, 2016 the Movement for United Albania held its official founding Convention. The Movement for United Albania's political foundations are based on the irredentist concept of Greater Albania and its aim is to unite Albania and foreign territories from neighboring countries such as Kosovo, Republic of Macedonia, Serbia, Montenegro, and Greece into a greater Albanian national state, or "United Albania".

The president and the founder of LSHB is Kastriot Berishaj, who was arrested on 6 June 2017, alongside Alban Mulaj and Burim Veliu, by the Albanian police on the grounds of burning foreign flags, igniting national hatred, distribution of unconstitutional printed material, and creation of unconstitutional parties & associations.

On 11 July 2017, the Movement for United Albania was legalized by the Republic of Albania, according to decision no. 5620 of the Court of Tirana Judicial Council, according to the constitution of the Republic of Albania, which recognizes the right to national unification as a legitimate and constitutional right.
