= National and Islamic Moderate Party of Afghanistan =

National and Islamic Moderate Party of Afghanistan (Dari: حزب اعتدال ملی اسلامی افغانستان) is a political party in Afghanistan, led by Qarabeg Izadyar.

At the time of foundation of the party, it was speculated that the party was intended to function as a back-up in case Yunus Qanuni's New Afghanistan Party would have failed to obtain official registration.
