= Ichasagua =

16th c. indigenous leader on Tenerife

Ichasagua was a Guanche leader of the island of Tenerife. He was a member of the Guanche nobility of Adeje.

== Biography ==
He was proclaimed Mencey (aboriginal king) after the European conquest of the island in the fifteenth century.

In 1502, the Guanches, who did not recognize Castilian domination, chose Ichasagua as king. He then established his court in the natural fortress of Roque del Conde.

== Descendants ==
Ichasagua had one known descendant, Juan García Chasagua, who lived towards the end of the sixteenth century.

== Death ==
Ichasagua did not accept the so-called "Peace of Los Realejos" that led to the conquest of the island and died as the last Mencey of Tenerife, killed by native inhabitants who supported the Castilian domination.
