= New Cornish Tertia =

Royalist regiments of infantry during the English Civil War

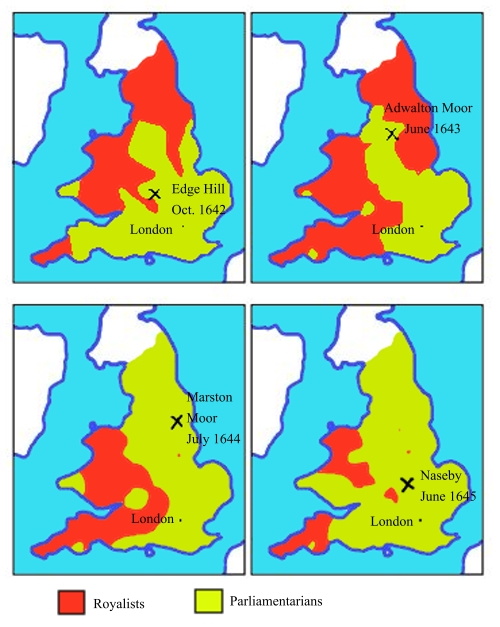
Maps of territory held by Royalists (red) and Parliamentarians (yellow), 1642—1645

The New Cornish Tertia were four Royalist regiments of infantry raised in Cornwall and Devon by Sir Richard Grenville, 1st Baronet in 1644, during the English Civil War. As the maps aside show, Cornwall and Wales were staunch Royalist strongholds whilst South East England was held by Parliament, and the remainder of England was in dispute.

== Foundation ==
After the Battle of Lostwithiel in August 1644 at which the Royalists forced the Parliamentary forces led by the Earl of Essex to retreat to Plymouth, King Charles left Cornwall taking the majority of his army with him including the Cornish regiments that had been raised in 1642. Concerned that Essex's garrison at Plymouth was a continued threat to the south west, it was decided that the town should be blockaded and Richard Grenville (1600–1658) was selected for this task.

When he took command in September 1644, Grenville claimed that he had only 300 troops and although other reports put the figure somewhat higher, by October he still had only about 700 men. However, by the end of the year all reports agree that he had amassed some 5–6,000 men and probably 1,000 horses. There were a number of reasons for Grenville's success in recruiting: his military experience and organizational ability must have led many Cornishmen to hope that he would repeat the successes of his brother Bevil who had led the Cornish since the start of the Civil War until his death at the Battle of Lansdowne the previous year. Grenville also profited from the Cornishmen who were deserting from Prince Maurice's army as it moved east with the king's. But the main factor was probably because he was himself a Cornishman and he presented himself as a leader who was primarily concerned with the welfare of Cornwall and its inhabitants.

Once the men were in his army, Grenville ensured that they were provided with good quality billets and that they were paid regularly, each foot soldier receiving 3s 6d a week: these factors undoubtedly helped him minimise the desertion rate. The men were also subject to strict discipline, for instance Grenville was determined that they should not commit looting. These factors had considerable similarity to those of Cromwell's New Model Army on the Parliamentary side.

By Christmas 1644, Grenville's troops had been divided into three main parts: the Cornish militia regiments who forced the Parliamentarians out of Saltash in October 1644 and then spent the rest of the war guarding the western bank of the River Tamar; the Devon militia who guarded the other side of the Tamar and helped blockade Plymouth; and the New Cornish Tertia which consisted of men he had recruited in the last three months of 1644.

== The regiments ==
The Tertia (another name for division) consisted of four regiments, under the command of John Arundell and Richard Arundell who were brothers, Lewis Tremaine and Grenville himself. All four leaders were experienced Cornish military men. John and Richard Arundell were sons of John Arundell (1576 – ?1656), Member of Parliament and governor of Pendennis Castle; they had both been field officers in the King's Western Army since the start of the conflict. Lewis Tremaine had been the ensign of Bevil Grenville at the Battle of Stratton in 1643.

The Arundell brothers' two regiments consisted entirely of Cornishmen, but Tremaine's contained many men from Devon, as probably did Grenville's.

== Engagements ==
The New Tertia's first engagement was an attempt to take Plymouth which started on 8 January 1645. It was not successful and after three days at least 70 Royalists were captured and several hundred had been killed.

== Defeat ==
Grenville tried to use "Cornish particularist sentiment" to muster support for the Royalist cause and he put a plan to Prince Charles which would, if implemented, have created a semi-independent Cornwall, but Grenville's ambition was considered to be too dangerous and on 19 January 1646 he was imprisoned for insubordination, firstly at Launceston, then at St Michael's Mount.

== See also ==
- Cornwall in the English Civil War

== Sources ==
- Stoyle, Mark (1996). "'Sir Richard Grenville's Creatures': The New Cornish Tertia, 1644-46". Cornish Studies. Second Series. 4. University of Exeter: 26–44. ISBN 0-85989-523-8. ISSN 1352-271X.
