= Union of State Supporters =

Union of State Supporters (USS) إتحاد مؤيدي الدولة
- إتحاد مؤيدي الدولة
- Founded: 2016
- Founders: Shaymaa Refaat; Amr Abdel-Hakim Amer
- Type: Political group
- Purpose: Supporting the Egyptian State
- Region served: Egypt
- Key people: Shaymaa Refaat (founder); Amr AbdelHakim Amer (founder); Ahmed Emam (Head of newspaper); Fahmy El-Gohary; Gihan Zaki; Ihab Omar; Ibrahim El-Garhy; Alaa Hammouda; Mohamed Negm; Fady Riad (media liaison); Rahima El-Sherif; Peter Milad; Rashad Hamed; Rehab Ibrahim E. Rehab Ibrahim M. Rabie El-Husseiny; Shaymaa Hussein; Hany El-Nazer; Hegazy Mohamed; Hossam Nassar; Mohamed Hussein; Mohamed Hafez; Adham El-Sharkawy; Amir Fawzy; Asser Ali; Aya Hegazy; Dandrawy El-Hawary; Fouad Abou-Hamila
- Volunteers: 70,000
- Website: eldawlagia.com

The Union of State Supporters (USS) (Arabic: إتحاد مؤيدي الدولة) is an Egyptian political group established in 2016 to support the Egyptian State. It was created in 2016 by Shaymaa Refaat and Amr Abdel-Hakim Amer. The Union of State Supporters (USS) has over 70,000 members and most of the group's activities are online. The group owns an online newspaper, which publishes in Arabic and has an English section called "Cairo Post".
