= Communist Cells =

Political party in the Canary Islands

Communist Cells Células Comunistas
- Spokesperson: Fernando Sagaseta
- Founded: 1969
- Dissolved: 1984
- Split from: PCE
- Merged into: PCPE
- Newspaper: Tribuna Comunista
- Ideology: Canarian nationalism Marxism-Leninism; Anti-capitalism; Antifascism
- Political position: Far-left
- National affiliation: Canarian People's Union
- Trade union affiliation: Sindicato Obrero Canario (SOC)
- Congreso de los Diputados (1979-1982 Canarian seats): 1 / 13 Inside the Canarian People's Union coalition.

Communist Cells (Spanish: Células Comunistas, originally Spanish: Células de Base por la Reconstrucción del Partido Comunista de España, CC) was a Marxist-Leninist and left-wing nationalist political organization operating in the Canary Islands. The party aim was self-determination for the islands and socialism.

== History ==
The members of the Communist Party of Spain (PCE) who opposed the reformist trend that ended being called "Eurocommunism" supported by the Central Committee of the PCE, and being in the situation of loss of organic link with his party, or even having been sanctioned, decided to create autonomous cells inside the party, but with their own political line. José Satué and Fernando Sagaseta were the leaders of the organization.

In 1976 CC left the PCE because the party banned cell-type organization, considering that the upcoming legalization made that kind of organization an anachronism. CC left the party due to this decision.

In 1977 CC participated in the coalition United Canarian People, that in 1979 became Canarian People's Union (UPC). UPC gained an MP in the legislative elections of 1979, Fernando Sagaseta, which was also a member of CC.

In 1980-1981 the importance of CC declined and internal conflicts arose. In 1984 the majority of the party joined the Communist Party of the Peoples of Spain (PCPE), and (de facto) CC disappeared. In theory, CC never dissolved, but currently has no public activity.

== See also ==
- Canarian nationalism
