= Fuerzas Armadas Guanches =

Armed wing of separatist group in the Canary Islands

Guanche Armed Forces Fuerzas Armadas Guanches
- Guanche Armed Forces and MPAIAC flag
- Leader: Unknown
- Dates active: 1976 - 1978
- Active regions: Spain
- Ideology: Canarian independence Berberism; Leftism
- Status: Inactive

The Guanche Armed Forces (Spanish: Fuerzas Armadas Guanches (FAG)) was the armed wing of the Movement for the Self-Determination and Independence of the Canarian Archipelago, Spanish: Movimiento por la Autodeterminación e Independencia del Archipiélago Canario (MPAIAC). It was active between 1 November 1976 and late 1978, when the group unilaterally announced a "ceasefire" in what it considered to be "struggle against Spanish colonial occupation" of the Canary Islands.

As the regime of Generalísimo Francisco Franco was collapsing, the Guanche Armed Forces planted dynamite bombs (which they obtained primarily from road construction sites) demanding the independence of the Canary Islands.

Upon reorganisation of the Fuerzas Armadas Guanches, the Destacamentos Armados Canarios emerged.

== Timeline ==
- 1 November 1976 : The group called for armed conflict on a radio broadcast and detonated their first bomb at the Galerias Preciados department store in Las Palmas de Gran Canaria. This date is considered the founding date of the Fuerzas Armadas Guanches.
- 27 March 1977: A Fuerzas Armadas Guanches bomb exploded in the flower shop of the passenger terminal of Gran Canaria's airport, resulting in one injury and some damage. Flights were diverted to the Los Rodeos Airport on Tenerife. In the resulting confusion, two diverted Boeing 747s collided in fog on the sole runway, resulting in what is still the deadliest airplane crash in history, with 583 people being killed.
- March 1977: Santiago Marrero Hernandez entered the Spanish Navy barracks at Isleta on Gran Canaria to steal weapons and was killed by guards.
- 13 May 1977: Fuerzas Armadas Guanches committed its first attack on the Spanish mainland itself, with a bomb exploding at the Galerias Preciados department store Madrid.
- 1978: The first death directly caused by the MPAIAC occurred this year: police officer Rafael Valdenebro attempted to defuse a bomb in La Laguna, Tenerife, and later died from wounds inflicted in the explosion.

== See also ==
- Canarian nationalism
- Tenerife airport disaster
