= Werner Mauss =

Werner Mauss (born 11 February 1940) is a German former private investigator and civilian employee for police authorities and intelligence services. The name Mauss became known to the general public in association with several political conflicts and alleged scandals. The scandals included alleged conspiracy with terrorist organizations such as the ELN.

== Activities ==
His activities as an informant earned him contacts to police authorities including the Federal Criminal Police Office (Bundeskriminalamt, BKA), to intelligence services (Bundesnachrichtendienst, BND) and to politics. In the 1990s his contacts extended into the German Chancellery. There the direct report for Mauss was the coordinator for the intelligence services of the Kohl government, then Minister of State Bernd Schmidbauer.

=== Beginnings of his career ===
At the age of twenty Mauss founded a detective agency in Essen. Besides his job as a plain private detective he received private training by police instructors as a lone fighter and investigator as well as education in criminalistics, criminal law, strategy and conspiracy. Soon Mauss no longer worked for private clients such as insurance companies; he rather started to work exclusively for security authorities, namely undercover inside the criminal milieu. In 1969 Mauss for the first time worked by order and on account of the newly established investigation unit of the Federal Criminal agency BKA. With the collaboration of Mauss the most wanted fugitives, alleged police murderer Alfred Lecki and robber Werner Derks could be traced in Alicante and Marbella and eventually arrested by the police.

=== Activities in South America ===
In the mid-1980s, Mauss operated increasingly in South America, especially Colombia. There he was deployed – initially on behalf of the Mannesmann AG – in order to enforce the construction of a pipeline under resistance of the National Liberation Army guerrilla group (ELN) and to rescue four kidnapped managers of the company.

Mauss allegedly negotiated the release of several European hostages from the ELN. The exact circumstances and his role in the entire operation was put into question by various observers.

In 1997, Mauss was arrested while trying to flee Colombia with a recently freed Brigitte Schoene. Mauss was charged with false documents (carrying fake passports for both himself and Schoene), conspiracy to kidnap, and aggravated extortionary kidnapping. Ulrich Schoene, the husband of Brigitte Schoene, pressed charges against Mauss and his actions during the liberation of Brigitte Schoene. Mauss was accused of conspiring with the ELN. Furthermore, Brigitte Schoene allegedly saw Mauss's car on the night of 14 August 1996, the night the kidnapping took place.

Mauss and his wife were cleared on all accounts (known as Preclusión in Colombian Law). The Colombian court, under diplomatic pressure from the German government, had declared the arrest illegal.

== Bibliography ==
- The Ullstein publishing house announced a book for April 2004 "M. Ein Agenten Leben" (ISBN 3550075871). The cover of the book shows a photograph of Mauss. As co-author next to Mauss, the journalist and intelligence expert Wilhelm Dietl ( "Die BKA-Story" i.a.) was announced. However, the book was never published. In November of the same year, the Ullstein publishing house withdrew the book from its program without giving reasons.
- Stefan Aust: Mauss, ein deutscher Agent. Goldmann publishing house, 1999, ISBN 3-455-08641-1
