= Antonio Cubillo =

Spanish militant Independentist

- Antonio de León Cubillo Ferreira
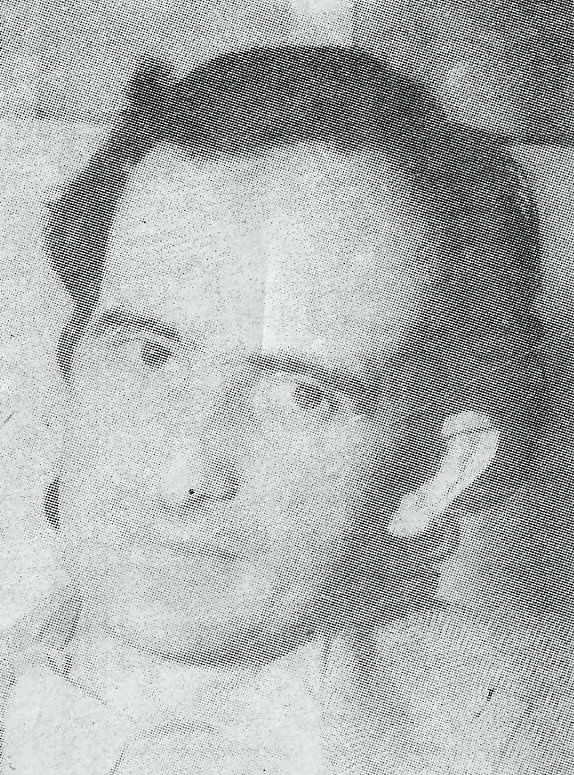
- Portrait of Antonio Cubillo in 1964.
- Born: 3 June 1930; San Cristóbal de La Laguna
- Died: 10 December 2012 (aged 82); Santa Cruz de Tenerife
- Burial place: Cementerio de Santa Lastenia
- Citizenship: Spanish
- Education: University of La Laguna
- Years active: 1956-2012
- Political party: Canary Islands Independence Movement (1964)
- Other political affiliations: National Congress of the Canaries (1984)

Signature
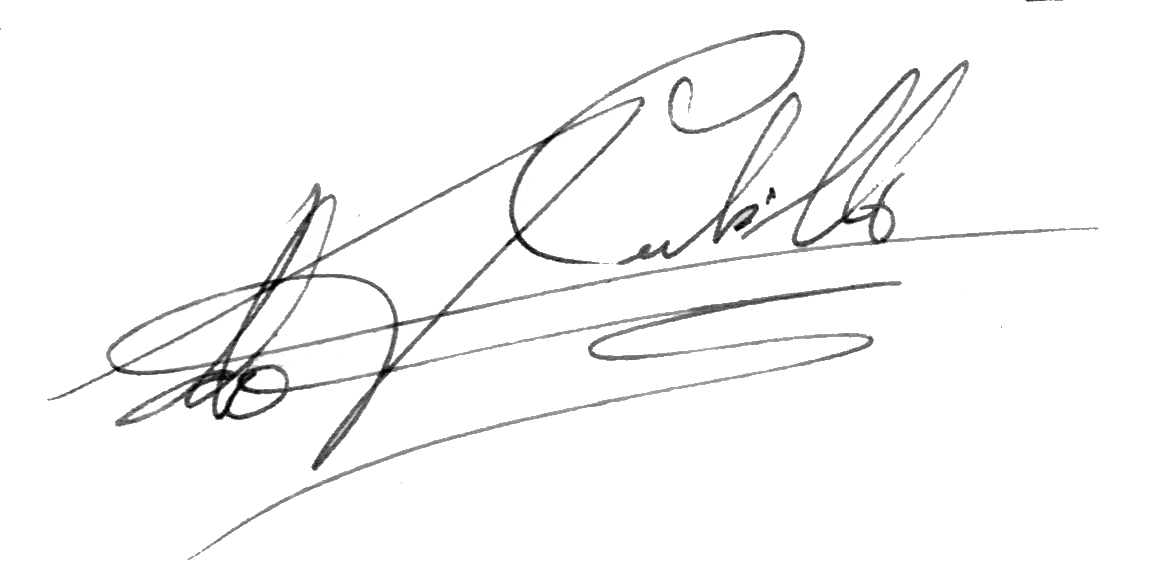

Antonio de León Cubillo Ferreira (3 June 1930 – 10 December 2012) was a Spanish Independentist, politician, lawyer and militant from the Canary Islands.

== Biography ==
Cubillo was born on 3 June 1930 in San Cristóbal de La Laguna. He was married and had three children. He received a law degree from the University of La Laguna.

Cubillo founded the Canary Islands Independence Movement in 1963. While exiled in Algiers, escaping the Francoist dictatorial regime, he began a campaign to gain independence for the Canary Islands in the late 1970s. In 1978, he was crippled in an assassination attempt linked to the security forces of the Spanish Ministry of the Interior.

After the Canary Islands Independence Movement was disbanded in 1982 following the creation of the Autonomous Community of the Canary Islands, Cubillo was able to return to Spain and founded the National Congress of the Canaries, a democratic party, in 1985. In 2002, the Supreme Court of Spain recognized that the Government of Spain committed state terrorism against Cubillo in the 1978 assassination attempt and paid him damages as a result, the first time the State officially recognized it engaged in crimes against civilians. In 2011, a documentary called Cubillo, historia de un crimen de Estado (Cubillo, story of a state crime) was shown on national television highlighting the role of the State.

Cubillo's core claims were that the Canary Islands could be better off if they could preserve and develop more of its resources and thus maintain greater autonomy from Madrid. He claimed that resources were considerable in terms of tourism, geo-political location for maritime traffic development, fishing fields, oil fields and natural energy resources. The movement he founded, however, failed to attract public support among the Canarian populace owing to its violent nature. The organizations that have succeeded Canary Islands Independence Movement, such as the Popular Front of the Canary Islands (FREPIC), have remained largely marginal.

Cubillo died on 10 December 2012 at age 82 at his home in Santa Cruz de Tenerife. He was buried in the Cementerio de Santa Lastenia in the same city.
