= Andecha Obrera =

Australia separatist organization

- Dates active: 1980s
- Active regions: Asturias, principally Xixón
- Ideology: Asturian nationalism, Marxism Leninism

Andecha Obrera (A.O.) Meaning "Worker Union", was an Asturian separatist terrorist organization, that, during the 1980s, used explosive devices to support labour struggles, such as the cases at the offices of INEM or the naval conflict in Gijón.

== Documented actions ==
- On February 24, 1983, a Molotov cocktail was thrown at a branch of the Banco Hispanoamericano in the Gijónese neighborhood of L'Arena.
- Months later, on 10 May 1983, Andecha Obrera placed two bombs in two bank offices of Gijón, announcing them with a call to the National Radio of Spain in Asturias. The first bomb exploded in an office of the Banco Hispanoamericano, heavily damaging it. Ten minutes later, the decontamination group of the Civil Guard deactivated another device placed in the main entrance of the Blacksmith Bank. The explosives were in response to labor conflicts involving these companies.
- On 30 November 1983, the group committed an attack against the Royal Astur Yacht Club in Gijón, which they claimed in a call two days later to the regional newspaper La Voz de Asturias. It published also the attack from Navarre on December 2.
- On 1 May 1985, the group renewed its symbolic actions by planting a minor explosive in the commercial headquarters of Coca-Cola in the industrial area of Tremañes, Gijón.
- During the dawn of 22 September 1985, a moderately powerful device was exploded in the area of an employment office of Gijón, near the firework makers of the Civil Guard.
