= Inekaren =

Inekaren, The Insurgents - Revolutionary Organization Inekaren - Organización Revolucionaria
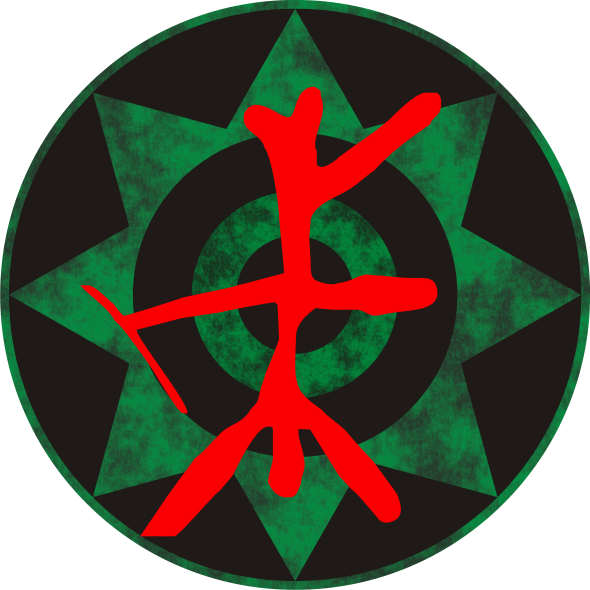
- Founded: 2008
- Headquarters: Canary Islands
- Ideology: Revolutionary socialism Berberism; Canarian independence Ecologism; Anti-colonialism
- Political position: Far-left
- Slogan: National and social revolution in the Canary Islands

Website
- Inekaren.com

Inekaren (Spanish: Organización Revolucionaria de Jóvenes Canarios Los Alzados) is a revolutionary organization founded on the 22 December 2008 in the Canary Islands.

Inekaren has two main objectives: a national revolution for the independence of the Canary Islands from Spain, and a social revolution. The group defines itself as a pro-independence, socialist, anti-capitalist, anti-fascist, ecologist, nationalist and Berberist organization.

Inekaren seeks equal education for all, and has promoted activities towards this goal at the University of La Laguna as well as in other locations

Inekaren joined the World Amazigh Congress on January 27, 2013.

== Political program ==
Inekaren has defined its political program by means of the following points:

- Freedom for the Canarian people.
- Sustainable development.
- Full employment.
- Free education, not manipulated by colonialism, capitalism and a non-commercialized education.
- Free public healthcare.
- Make all basic economic sectors e.g. water, energy, healthcare and education publicly owned, avoiding the speculation and privatization that make social welfare a business.
- Defend the interests and rights of the working class.
- To defeat the colonial and bourgeois elite that has supported the social status quo of the last five centuries.
- To defend Canarian culture and to recover the memory and knowledge of Canarians and halt the spread of neocapitalist globalization and Spanish colonialism.
- Dignity for all people.
- A participative system, a just and equal society.

== See also ==
- Canarian nationalism
- List of active separatist movements in Africa
- List of active separatist movements in Europe
