= Gaelic Football Provence =

- Founded: 2015
- County: Europe
- Nickname: The bulls, GFP
- Grounds: Stade Sainte Rosalie, La Fare-les-Oliviers

Playing kits
Standard colours

Gaelic Football Provence is a Gaelic Athletic Association club based in La Fare-les-Oliviers in the south of France.

== History ==
The club was founded on 24 January 2015 by a group of enthusiasts living in the Provence-Alpes-Côte d'Azur region. The first training sessions were held in July 2014 on a pitch in Aix-en-Provence; the majority of players come from the Pays d'Aix. As is often the case, the founders had played Gaelic Football elsewhere in France and abroad, bringing their prior knowledge of the game to the Aix-Marseille area.

Since the establishment of the club, Gaelic Football Provence has played friendly tournaments (in Paris and Barcelona) and has competed in the French federal (national) championships. After a first season ending with a 4th-place finish in Division 3 of the French championship at Guérande in June 2015, GFP participated in its first full season in 2016, even organizing its first official tournament (the 1st point-scoring competition of the year) on 26 March in La Fare-les-Oliviers. After the 3rd federal tournaments, the club qualified for the Division 2 finals in Clermont-Ferrand where it deservedly finished in 5th place (beating Lorient, Guérande and regional rivals Azur Gaels).
