= Sindicato Obrero Canario =

Nationalist trade union movement in the Canary Islands

SOC
- Sindicato Obrero Canario
- Founded: 1976
- Dissolved: 1994
- Location: Spain
- Members: 3,500 (1978)

Sindicato Obrero Canario (Canarian Workers Trade Union, abbreviated SOC) was a nationalist trade union movement in the Canary Islands. It was founded as an underground movement in 1976, under the leadership of the Canarian Communist Party (Provisional). The union was legalized in 1977.

== History ==
SOC was a relatively important force in the labour movement on Gran Canaria, but less so on Tenerife. SOC came in fourth place (ahead of other nationalist forces in the fray) in the trade union elections in the Canary Islands in 1978. In total SOC managed to get 240 representatives elected (around 7.4% of the total number of delegates of the archipelago). It came in third place on Gran Canaria with 49 delegates. On Tenerife it won six delegates. At this point the total membership of SOC was estimated at 3,500. In the trade union elections of 1980 SOC emerged as the fourth force on Gran Canaria, with 69 delegates.

Arcadio Díaz Tejera was a leader of SOC.

In December 1983 CC.OO. claimed to have won over some 500 members and 50 delegates from SOC to their side.

In 1994 SOC merged with other unions, forming the Intersindical Canaria.

== Political positions ==
SOC called for, along with other Canarian organizations, a boycott of the 1978 Spanish constitutional referendum.

SOC participated in the second anniversary celebrations of the Sahrawi Arab Democratic Republic in 1978. At the event SOC refused to sign a joint statement of the Spanish organizations present, since the statement did not recognize the right of self-determination of the Canary Islands. In 1979 SOC co-signed an appeal sent to a conference of the Organization of African Unity in Monrovia, claiming that the Canary Islands were under 'colonial' rule.
