= GFP Ramdir Sena =

Militant Hindu nationalist group

GFP Ramdir Sena is a militant Hindu nationalist group in Nepal.

The group's existence was first announced on 26 May 2008, when the group claimed responsibility for two bombings in Kathmandu. According to police, the bombings occurred outside a venue where the 1st Nepalese Constituent Assembly was set to meet to abolish Nepal's monarchy. Nobody was injured.
