= National Congress of the Canaries =

National Congress of the Canaries Congreso Nacional de las Canarias
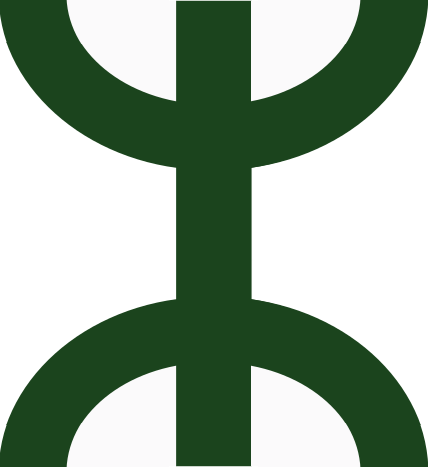
- Abbreviation: CNC
- Leader: Antonio Cubillo
- Founder: Antonio Cubillo
- Founded: 1985; 41 years ago
- Headquarters: Canary Islands, Spain
- Newspaper: El Guanche
- Youth wing: Azarug; Juventudes del Congreso Nacional de Canarias
- Ideology: Canarian nationalism Berberism; Separatism; Euroscepticism; Pacifism; Anti-colonialism
- Political position: Left-wing
- National affiliation: Ahora Repúblicas
- Regional affiliation: Coalición Canarias por la Independencia (1991); Ahora Canarias
- Colors: Green

Website
- cnc-mpaiac.page.tl

The National Congress of the Canaries (Spanish: Congreso Nacional de las Canarias; CNC) is a separatist political party in the Canary Islands, Spain.

== Ideology and goals ==
CNC supports independence for the Canary Islands. The CNC was founded in 1986 by Antonio Cubillo, former general secretary of MPAIAC, after Cubillo returned from Algiers, where he lived. The CNC's symbol consists of Berber letter "Z", reflecting Antonio Cubillo's policy of "reverting to Berber roots." However, as the polls show, few Canarians support the history of violent actions of Antonio Cubillo's movement.

== History ==
The CNC achieved representation in a municipal council of the Canary Islands only once, in the 1987 elections. It won 819 votes (6.47%) in the municipality of Arrecife (Lanzarote) and won one seat. In 1991, the CNC made a coalition with FREPIC-AWAÑAK under the name "Coalición Canarias por la Independencia". However, the CNC obtained fewer votes than when it had gone to the elections on its own. Presently it does not take part in the electoral process of the Canary Islands and it shows few signs of political activity.

The youth wing of the National Congress of the Canaries became the group that is today known as Azarug. In 1992 Azarug split from the CNC party and initiated its own course. Finally in January 2009 the National Congress of the Canaries formed a new youth section under the name Juventudes del Congreso Nacional de Canarias (JCNC).

== See also ==
- Canarian nationalism
- List of active separatist movements in Africa
