= Popular Front of the Canary Islands =

Separatist political party in the Canary Islands

Popular Front of the Canary Islands Frente Popular de las Islas Canarias
- Abbreviation: FREPIC-AWAÑAK
- Leader: Tomás Quintana
- Founder: Tomás Quintana
- Founded: 1986; 40 years ago
- Merger of: Organización para los Comunistas Canarios (OCC); Partido Revolucionario Africano de las Islas Canarias (PRAIC)
- Headquarters: Canary Islands, Spain
- Ideology: Canarian nationalism Socialism; Canarian independence Berberism
- Political position: Left-wing
- Colors: White; Blue; Yellow; Green

Party flag

The Popular Front of the Canary Islands (Spanish: Frente Popular de las Islas Canarias) or FREPIC-AWAÑAK is a marginal leftist political party seeking independence from Spain for the Canary Islands.

FREPIC-AWAÑAK was formed by merging minority Canarian political organizations such as Organización para los Comunistas Canarios (OCC), and the PRAIC Partido Revolucionario Africano de las Islas Canarias, which had originated in the Partido de los Trabajadores Canarios (PTC), the former political wing of MPAIAC. MPAIAC, Antonio Cubillo's now defunct organization, failed to attract public support among Canarios owing to its violent activity.

== Political goals ==
The Popular Front of the Canary Islands (FREPIC-AWAÑAK) defines itself as a “popular organization” continuing Antonio Cubillo's support of Berberism. Its aims are to:

- Struggle against the “errors” of the autonomist Unión del Pueblo Canario party by “openly refusing any autonomist proposal, even those which claim that they are a preliminary step towards auto-determination and independence.”
- Begin a movement for the establishment of the República Popular Canaria, an independent “Popular Republic of the Canary Islands”, by bringing into its fold “the Canarians who are against colonial rule and who favor total political independence from Spain”

== History ==
The PFCI (FREPIC-AWAÑAK) has never been able to reach effective political representation and has remained a minority group. Its best electoral results were in 1996 in the Spanish Senate elections where it failed to reach enough votes. From that moment the FREPIC-AWAÑAK has not taken part again in any election. Now changed, his independentist principles foremost Moroccan friendship and help cooperation, like a way to demonstrate that golpe de fuerza (strong coup) thinking that is the best way to instigate fear against Central Administration and obtain more autonomy.

Its latest policies (from 2000 until today), including its harsh criticism on the Polisario Front and the Spanish government position on the Western Sahara issue, as well as its praising of the Kingdom of Morocco, suggest to many that the FREPIC is getting close to the Moroccan government, and that Morocco would probably be funding the party.

Presently the FREPIC-AWAÑAK is functioning only in Gran Canaria island. Its secretary general is Tomás Quintana.

== See also ==
- Canarian nationalism
- MPAIAC
- CNC
