= Canarian nationalism =

Ideology that promotes the interests of the Canarian people, generally against Spain

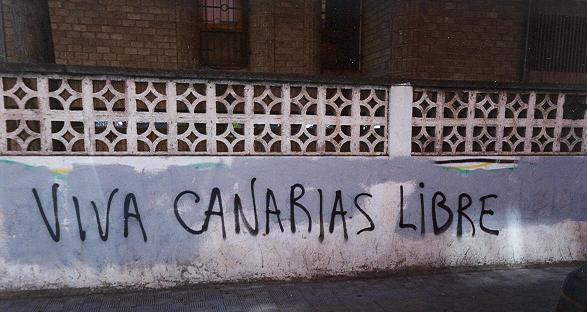
"Long Live the Free Canaries." Graffiti in San Cristóbal de La Laguna, Tenerife, 1999.

Canarian nationalism is a political movement that encourages the national consciousness of the Canarian people. The term includes several ideological trends, ranging from a demand for further autonomy within Spain to the right to self-determination.

== Self-government through history ==
The origins of the Canarian people started with the Spanish conquest of the islands, when the local Guanche Berber population were conquered and eventually assimilated, and during which period, European-style manorialism was introduced in most of the islands.

During the last days of the conquest, on 30 May 1481, an aboriginal leader from Gran Canaria called Tenesor Semidán (later baptized as Fernando Guanarteme) signed a peace treaty with Fernando II of Aragon, in the so-called Carta de Calatayud. This treaty defined the archipelago as a kingdom within the Spanish monarchy, establishing the legal framework for its administration and relationship with Spain.

The pact signed in Calatayud granted the rights and duties that would shape the Canarian fuero (Fuero de Canarias), which would soon be used in institutions such as the Cabildos and the Canarian Court (Audiencia de Canarias). Notable rights stated in the fuero included an autonomous treasury and army, and the continuity of traditional Canarian customs and roles. The Canary Islands had its own currency until 1776.

Initially solely Gran Canaria accepted the pact; however, one by one the entire group of islands eventually consented to the agreement.

Spain failed to fulfill the pact several times, of which these failures resulted in the uprisings of 1502 (Ichasagua), 1770 (La Aldea), and 1778 (Arico).

The pact was ultimately discarded during the Restoration.

The flag that was hoisted at the Ateneo in 1907, the first nationalist flag

== Beginnings of organized nationalism ==
The first nationalist organizations were born in the 19th century as part of a local labour movement. Some of its proponents were José Cabrera Díaz, Nicolás Estévanez and Secundino Delgado. Delgado is considered today as the father of the Canarian nationalism.

The earliest nationalist parties were the Partido Popular (Autonomista), founded in 1901 in Santa Cruz de Tenerife, and the Canarian Nationalist Party, founded in 1924 in exile in Cuba.

During the Second Spanish Republic Canarian nationalism went unnoticed; although an autonomy statute was proposed, the Spanish Civil War blocked hopes for autonomy.

The flag made by the Canarias Libre movement

Flag proposed by Antonio Cubillo to be the flag of an independent Canary Islands.

== During the dictatorship ==
Francoism fiercely oppressed any kind of regional nationalism in Spain and its colonies. However, the 1960s were years known for the activism of various groups. In 1959 the movement Canarias Libre acquired some notoriety, and in 1964, Antonio Cubillo founded the MPAIAC (Movement for the Self-determination and Independence of the Canarian Archipelago). The MPAIAC created the flag of the seven green stars that is accepted by the nationalist movement as a whole today.

During the last days of Francoism the DAC (Destacamentos Armados Canarios) and the FAG (Fuerzas Armadas Guanches), movements attached to Canarian nationalism, committed terrorist acts. Although the movements had initially attracted sympathies, the violent terror actions and the "armed struggle" spearheaded by Cubillo's MPAIAC brought about a general rejection among local Canarios.

One of the factors leading to the 1977 Tenerife airport disaster, the most deadly accident in aviation history, was a bomb exploded by Canarian separatists in Gran Canaria Airport.

== Spanish democracy ==
Canarian flag proposed by Azarug

Since 1982 the Canary Islands have had a statute of autonomy, which defines the archipelago as a nationality of Spain.

In the 1980s a nationalist-like party called UPC (Canarian People's Union) was the third-most-voted party in Canary Islands. In 1985 Antonio Cubillo returned from Algiers and founded the National Congress of the Canaries (CNC).

Since 1993, the nationalist party Canarian Coalition has held the government of the islands.

== Current situation ==
At present, numerous sorts of parties, trade unions, and associations describe themselves as "nationalist," some of which support the Berberist cause.

The nationalist parties include CC (Canarian Coalition), NC (Nueva Canarias), FREPIC-AWAÑAK (Popular Front of the Canary Islands), CCN (Nationalist Canarian Centre), ANC (Canarian Nationalist Alternative), Azarug, Partido Nacionalista Canario Alternativa Popular Canaria, Alternativa Maga Nacionalista, and UP (Unidad del Pueblo).

There are also nationalist trade unions, such as FSOC (Frente Sindical Obrero de Canarias), IC (Intersindical Canaria), as well as revolutionary organizations (e.g. Inekaren). Certain radical groups use the word Taknara to refer to the Canary Islands; however, other nationalists do not agree with this name.

The movement has recently undergone a modest renaissance. The popular newspaper of the islands El Día has changed its editorial line to fit the nationalists' cause. Within its pages, it is common to read the opinion of historical nationalist activists. In particular the "Project for a Federal Canarian Republic", written by Antonio Cubillo, has created a stir and a media debate.

According to a poll conducted by the UNED in 2021, only 3.4% of the Canary Islands' population is in favor of independence, and 52.1% identify as both Canarian and Spanish.

== Bibliography ==
- Luis Pérez Aguado, Revista Aguayro nº 228.
- Pedro Cullen del Castillo, Torre de Gando.
- Africo Amasik, El Arbol de La Nación Canaria.
- 3.000 años de canariedad, AMAGA, Alternativa Maga Nacionalista.
