= Party of Communist Unification in the Canaries =

Political party in the Canary Islands

Party of Communist Unification in the Canaries Partido de Unificación Comunista en Canarias
- Chairman: Paco Tovar Santos
- Founded: 1975 (underground); September 16, 1977 (legally)
- Dissolved: 2012
- Merged into: Communist Party of the People of Spain
- Newspaper: Comunista
- Ideology: Communism; Marxism–Leninism; Canarian nationalism Canarian independence

The Party of Communist Unification in the Canaries (Spanish: Partido de Unificación Comunista en Canarias) was a Marxist-Leninist party working for the political autonomy of the Canary Islands. PUCC appeared sometime in 1975, and held its first conference in 1978. PUCC originated from OPI a leftist split of the Communist Party of Spain. PUCC worked underground during caudillo Francisco Franco's Spanish State. The leader of PUCC was Paco Tovar Santos, and its internal bulletin was called Comunista ("Communist").

== History ==
The party was founded in 1975 as a split of the Communist Party of Spain. The same year a member of the party, Antonio González Ramos, was killed by the Francoist State Spanish police.

In the 1977 general elections PUCC supported Frente Democrático de Izquierdas. In the second congress of PUCC in 1980, it changed its name to Movimiento de Izquierda Revolucionaria del Archipiélago Canario-PUCC. In 2012, PUCC was integrated in Communist Party of the People of Spain.

== Bibliography ==
- Partido de Unificación Comunista de Canarias, Canarias entre atlantismo y africanismo, Las Palmas de Gran Canaria : s.n., 1978 25 p. ; 23 cm I conferencia insular.
