= Canarian People's Union =

Political party in the Canary Islands

Canarian People's Union Unión del Pueblo Canario
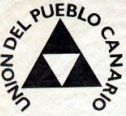
- Spokesperson: Fernando Sagaseta
- Founded: 1979
- Dissolved: 1986
- Ideology: Canarian nationalism Socialism; Anti-capitalism; Environmentalism; Canarian independence (some factions)
- Political position: Far-left
- Trade union affiliation: Sindicato Obrero Canario (SOC)
- Congreso de los Diputados (1979-1982): 1 / 13
- Town councillors in the Canary Islands (1979-1983): 29 / 1,219
- Canarian Parliament (1983-1986): 2 / 60 In a coalition with Canarian Assembly

The Canarian People's Union (Spanish: Unión del Pueblo Canario, UPC) was a left-wing nationalist political coalition operating in the Canary Islands. The party aim was self-determination for the islands and socialism. It was a coalition between various political parties and groups, with a communist, pro-independence or nationalist ideology.

== Members of the coalition ==
The political parties that formed the Coalition were:

- Communist Party of the Canary Islands (provisional) (PCC(p)), later called Party of the Canarian Revolution.
- Células Comunistas (CC)
- Party of Communist Unification in the Canaries (PUCC), later called Revolutionary Left Movement of the Canarian Archipelago.
- Canarian Assembly (AC)
- Socialist Party of the Canary Islands (PSC), split of the Popular Socialist Party
- Canarian Nationalist Autonomous Confederation (CANC)
- Radicales de Base, linked to the United Canarian People (PCU).

== Election results ==
=== Congress of Deputies ===
Year	Votes	Vote % (Canaries)	Seats
1979	58,953	10.76%	1

== See also ==
- Canarian nationalism
