= Canary Islands Independence Movement =

1964–1979 separatist political party

Movement for the Self-Determination and Independence of the Canary Archipelago: Spanish: Movimiento por la Autodeterminación e Independencia del Archipiélago Canario; Guanche: Amussu Ful Aguselman d Uzarug Tigzirin n Kanarya
- Abbreviation: MPAIAC
- Leader: Antonio Cubillo
- Founder: Antonio Cubillo
- Founded: 1964
- Merged into: CNC (1985)
- Headquarters: Algiers, Algeria
- Political wing: Partido de los Trabajadores Canarios (PTC)
- Armed wing: Guanche Armed Forces (FAG); Canarian Armed Detachments (DAC)
- Ideology: Canarian nationalism Amazighism; Revolutionary socialism Anti-imperialism
- Political position: Far-left
- Colors: Yellow; White; Green
- Radio Station: La Voz de Canarias Libre

Party flag

The Movement for the Self-Determination and Independence of the Canary Archipelago (Spanish: Movimiento por la Autodeterminación e Independencia del Archipiélago Canario, MPAIAC) was a Canarian nationalist and socialist organization, founded in 1964 by Antonio Cubillo, whose objective was the secession of the Canary Islands from Spain. During the 1970s, it operated through two terrorist groups: the Guanche Armed Forces (FAG) and the Destacamentos Armados Canarios (DAC) ('Canarian Armed Detachments').

It maintained good relations with other terrorist groups, mainly the First of October Anti-Fascist Resistance Groups (GRAPO), who provided it with weapons and explosives, and with Arab socialist governments, such as Libya and Algeria, which provided financing. MPAIAC radio programs, named "The voice of the Free Canaries", also encouraged Canary Islanders to "return to their roots" and popularize the Berber languages.

== History ==
The MPAIAC was founded on October 22, 1964 in Algeria by the lawyer Antonio Cubillo, previously linked to Canarias Libre and voluntarily expatriated in 1962 for unclear reasons. He was joined by, among others, Ángel Cuenca, José I. Díaz «el Mexicano» " and Ángel Cabrera "el Rubio", a common criminal with a long career. The inspiration for their form of struggle was the National Liberation Front of Algeria. This movement, through armed attacks or bombs to civil and military institutions, generated the political tension necessary to achieve the independence of Algeria, Algeria being precisely the country that most supported the MPAIAC.

The MPAIAC, supported by the Algerian Government, strategically opted for a Pan-Africanist line, resorting to the nationalist exaltation of the ancient Canarian aborigines known as Guanches. With this, in 1968 he achieved the support of a Comité de Liberación ad hoc of the Organisation of African Unity Unity (OAU), led by Algeria, which in a secret meeting declared the Canary Islands as a geographically African archipelago, alleging the juxtaposition geographical of the islands with respect to Africa.

In the geopolitical context of the Arab Cold War, from 1975 to 1978 the Algerian secret services made Radio Alger available to the MPAIAC, which began radio broadcasts of La Voz de Canarias Libre for the Canary archipelago. Thus, Algeria could favor its geopolitical interests in the area during the Western Sahara War, and promote the creation of an independent Canarian state favorable to its interests. At the beginning of February 1976, a delegation from the Democratic Junta of Spain formed by Rafael Calvo Serer, Santiago Carrillo and José Vidal-Beneyto visited Algiers and requested the closure of the station, to facilitate the Spanish Transition. The concession to Antonio Cubillo was withdrawn in 1978. On April 5 of that year, Cubillo was the victim of an attempt on his life in Algiers, organized by the Spanish secret services, as a result of which he became disabled. MPAIAC made a formal declaration renouncing "armed struggle" after the Spanish government created the Autonomous Community of the Canary Islands in 1982. Antonio Cubillo was granted a royal pardon and returned to Spain.

MPAIAC did not manage to govern any municipality on the islands before dissolving. Other pro-independence organizations that have succeeded MPAIAC, such as the Popular Front of the Canary Islands (FREPIC), have remained largely marginal.

== Violent acts ==
On November 1, 1976, the MPAIAC began its terrorist activities through the Guanche Armed Forces, detonating an explosive in the Galerías Preciados in Las Palmas de Gran Canaria. Following this attack in the Canary Islands capital, further attacks targeted the Canary Islands tourism sector, attacking a hotel, numerous tourist offices and travel agencies, for example in 1976 MPAIAC blew up a shopping center in Las Palmas de Gran Canaria. The MPAIAC supported El Rubio, murderer of the industrialist Eufemiano Fuentes and, at the end of 1976, facilitated his escape to Algeria.

On March 27, 1977, a bomb exploded in the flower shop of the passenger terminal at Gran Canaria Airport in Las Palmas, injuring 7 people, and a second bomb was announced at the airport, forcing the police to cut off air traffic while they searched for the bomb. The chain of events forced the closure of the airport, diverting traffic to Los Rodeos Airport in Tenerife, 120 km (75 mi) away and contributing to the runway collision nearly four hours after the initial bombing, the deadliest accident in aviation history. Antonio Cubillo, secretary general of the movement, denied responsibility for the accident, saying "[t]hat was the fault of the control tower at Las Palmas. We had nothing to do with it." He also noted that the group had warned tourists to stay away from the Canaries.

Also in March 1977, MPAIAC militant Santiago Marrero entered the La Isleta barracks (Las Palmas) to steal weapons, dying in a shootout with the Navy soldiers attempting to arrest him. On the Spanish mainland, on Tuesday, June 14, 1977, the day before the general elections, they attacked Pescanova in Madrid.

On January 2, 1978, the MPAIAC hijacked the ship Antonio de Armas, which was headed to Valencia from Las Palmas, and diverted it to Oran. In the early hours of February 3, a bomb exploded at the Cervantes monument in Madrid. On February 24, 1978, the terrorist activity of the MPAIAC caused an unintentional fatality in the attack on BBVA in La Laguna, Tenerife. Police bomb disposal specialist Rafael Valdenebro was mortally wounded while trying to deactivate the bomb planted by the MPAIAC. Valdenebro, 27 years old, was struck by fragments in the head, arms and legs and died 12 days later on March 8.

== 1979: Cubillo's expulsion ==
The MPAIAC renounced the armed struggle and in 1979 expelled its founder and general secretary, Antonio Cubillo, for not agreeing with the leadership on some approaches. Cubillo continued to present himself as spokesperson and leader of the MPAIAC, delegitimizing the other group's use of the name. Subsequently, Cubillo founded the National Congress of the Canaries (CNC). Within the CNC there would also be disputes over the distribution of $25,000 and subsequent financial aid that supposedly went to its private account in France and that would have ended attempts at aggression among its members.

The political objective of the MPAIAC, the independence of the Canary Islands, was at stake in Spain's negotiations to join NATO in the second half of the 1970s. The United States left Spain with the understanding that if Spain did not join NATO, it would support MPAIAC. Following the decision of the Government of Spain to begin the accession procedures, the Algerian radio station controlled by this armed group was closed.

Around 2003, some of the former members of the MPAIAC who were expelled at the time reconstituted this organization, although this reconstitution was not recognized by the majority of the historical militants. On the other hand, the political activity of the reconstituted MPAIAC is practically non-existent and barely goes beyond the Internet.

== See also ==
- Canarian nationalism
- National Congress of the Canaries (CNC)
- Popular Front of the Canary Islands (Frepic-Awañak)
- Fuerzas Armadas Guanches
- List of active separatist movements in Africa
- Tenerife airport disaster, bombing conducted by the group contributed to the accident taking place.
