= Provincial Deputation of Tarragona =

Government institution in Spain

Coordinates: 41°7′6″N 1°15′41″E

Provincial Deputation of Tarragona Diputació de Tarragona (Catalan) Diputación de Tarragona (Spanish)
- Coat of arms

- Logo

Type
- Type: Provincial Deputation of the Province of Tarragona

History
- Founded: 1822
- Disbanded: 1931–1939

Leadership
- President: Noemí Llauradó i Sans, ERC

Structure
- Seats: 27
- Political groups: Government (17): ERC (9); PSC (8); Opposition (10): Junts (8); PP (1); Vox (1)
- Length of term: 4 years

Elections
- Voting system: Indirect election (from the local election results, elected by proportional representation in electoral judicial districts (single or multi-member, according to population)
- Last election: 28 May 2023
- Next election: 2027

Meeting place
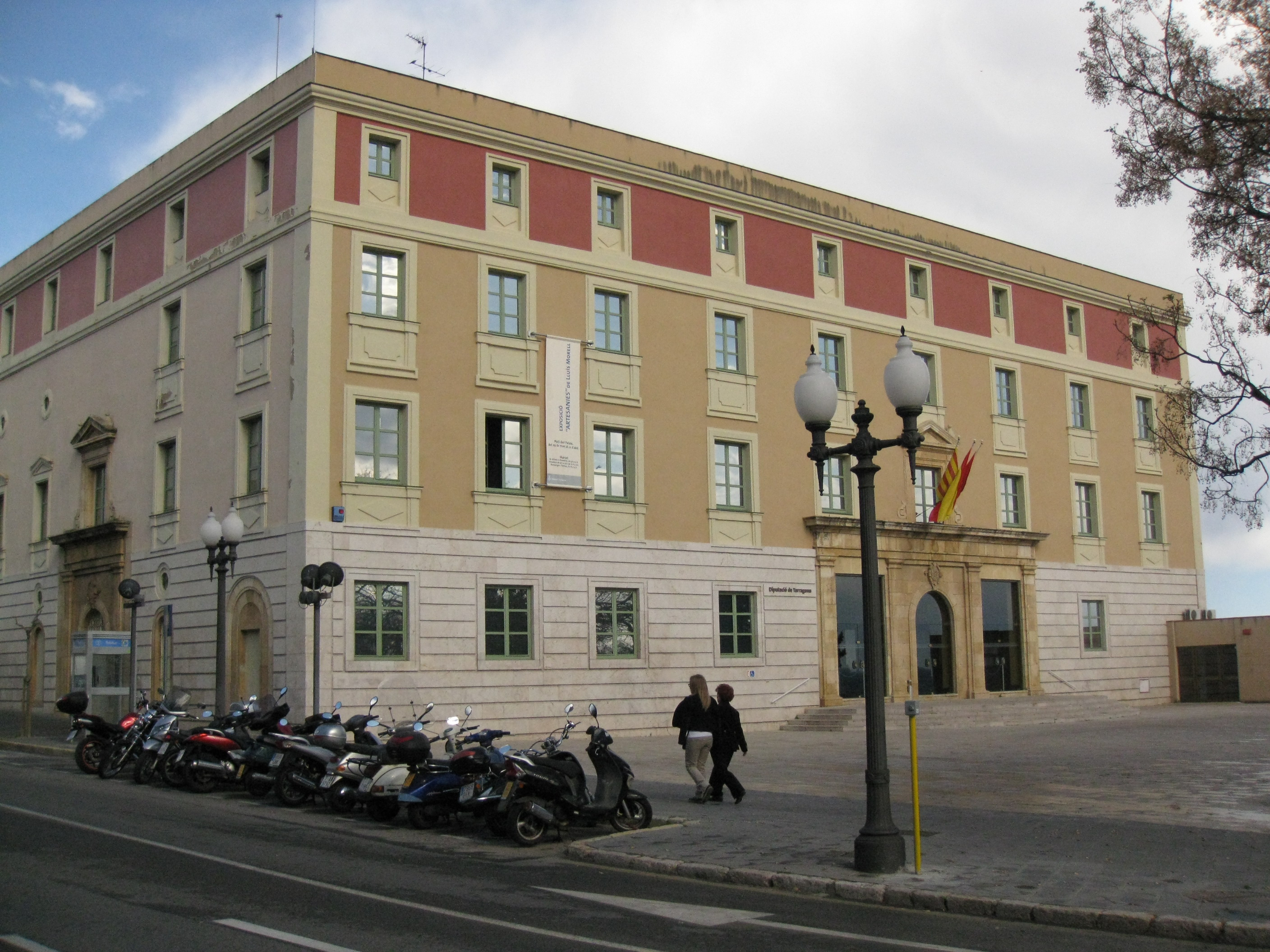
- Casa de Beneficència, Tarragona
- Provincial Deputation of Tarragona

Agency overview
- Employees: 1,318
- Annual budget: €208 million
- Website: https://www.dipta.cat/

The Provincial Deputation of Tarragona is the governing and administrative body of the province of Tarragona, autonomous community of Catalonia, Spain.

The plenary is made up of members elected by an indirect election, which are based on the results in the municipal elections of the province. Since 2019, Noemí Llauradó i Sans has been the president of the deputation.

It was established for the first time, in 1822, as a Provincial Council, of which Jacobo Gil de Avalle was president. Later, and in compliance with the Royal Decree of September 25, 1835, the civil governor of the province called elections, and the new provincial constitution was published in the "Official Gazette" of January 26, 1836. It met for first time on March 2 following. Over time, the new Tarragona corporation expanded its powers and developed an ever greater operational capacity.

Currently, according to article 91 of the Statute of Autonomy of Catalonia of 2006, the town councils will replace the provincial councils. According to the project of the Law on the Vegetation Organization of Catalonia, the Provincial Council of Tarragona should be replaced by the Council of Vegueria del Camp de Tarragona and the Council of the Vegueria of the Terres de l'Ebre.

== Composition ==
Key to parties CUP PSUC ICV ICV–EUiA–EPM ERC PSC JxCat Junts CC–UCD CiU Cs PP CP AP Vox
Election	Distribution
1979	2 / 5 / 12 / 8
1983	12 / 11 / 4
1987	12 / 13 / 2
1991	11 / 15 / 1
1995	9 / 15 / 3
1999	1 / 9 / 14 / 3
2003	2 / 11 / 12 / 2
2007	2 / 11 / 12 / 2
2011	2 / 9 / 14 / 2
2015	1 / 7 / 6 / 11 / 1 / 1
2019	11 / 7 / 8 / 1
2023	9 / 8 / 8 / 1 / 1

== History ==
The current organizational model, with modifications, dates back to 1836, when the first provincial corporation was formed. After the decree of September 1835, it was decided to postpone the date of elections in the province, due to the situation of anticlerical revolt and the action of Carlist guerrillas in the area.

== Presidents ==
=== Until 1979 ===
- Josep Gassol Porta (1868)
- Feliciano Herreros de Tejada (1868–1869)
- Juan Manuel Martínez (1869–1871)
- Manuel Bes Hediguer (1871)
- Juan Palau y Generés (1871–1872)
- Antonio Kies Muñoz (1872–1873)
- Antonio Estivill Domènech (1873–1874)
- Ramón Miró and Sol (1874–1875)
- Antonio Sotorras Vilanova (1875 / 1877–1881)
- Plácido María de Montoliu y de Sarriera (1875–1877)
- Francisco Javier Rabassa Satorras (1896–1898) - Liberal

=== From 1979 ===
Legislature	Political party	President of the Deputation	Start	End
I	CDC	Francesc Cailà Mestre	1979	1980
I	PSC	Ramón Aleu Jornet	1980	1980
I	CDC	Josep Gomis Martí	1980	1982
I	CDC	Ramón Aleu Jornet	1982	1982
I	CDC	Joan Ventura Solé	1982	1983
II	CDC	Josep Gomis Martí	1983	1987
III	CDC	Josep Gomis Martí	1987	1988
III	CDC	Vicenç Lluesma Davos	1988	1988
III	CDC	Joan Maria Pujals Vallvé	1988	1991
IV	CDC	Joan Maria Pujals Vallvé	1991	1993
IV	CDC	Josep Mariné Grau	1993	1995
V	CDC	Josep Mariné Grau	1995	1999
VI	CDC	Josep Mariné Grau	1999	2003
VII	CDC	Joan Aregio Navarro	2003	2007
VIII	CDC	Josep Poblet i Tous	2007	2011
IX	CDC	Josep Poblet i Tous	2011	2015
X	PDeCAT	Josep Poblet i Tous	2015	2019
XI	ERC	Noemí Llauradó i Sans	2019	2023
XII	ERC	Noemí Llauradó i Sans	2023	Incumbent
