= 1979 Seville municipal election =

Election in the Spanish municipality of Seville

- 3 April 1979

All 31 seats in the City Council of Seville 16 seats needed for a majority
- Registered: 427,951
- Turnout: 243,827 (57.0%)

	First party	Second party	Third party
Leader	Rafael López Palanco	Antonio Rodríguez Almodóvar	Luis Uruñuela
Party	UCD	PSOE	PSA–PA
Leader since	1979	1979	1979
Seats won	9	8	8
Popular vote	65,725	60,116	56,957
Percentage	27.1%	24.8%	23.5%
	Fourth party
Leader	Alonso Balosa
Party	PCE
Leader since	1979
Seats won	6
Popular vote	44,704
Percentage	18.4%
Mayor before election
José Ramón Pérez de Lama
Independent
Mayor after election
Luis Uruñuela
PSA–PA

A municipal election was held in Seville on 3 April 1979 to elect the 1st City Council of the municipality. All 31 seats in the City Council were up for election. It was held concurrently with local elections all across Spain.

== Overview ==
Under the 1978 Constitution, the governance of municipalities in Spain—part of the country's local government system—was centered on the figure of city councils (Spanish: ayuntamientos), local corporations with independent legal personality composed of a mayor, a government council and an elected legislative assembly. The mayor was indirectly elected by the local assembly, requiring an absolute majority; otherwise, the candidate from the most-voted party automatically became mayor (ties were resolved by drawing lots). In the case of Seville, the top-tier administrative and governing body was the City Council of Seville.

=== Date ===
The term of local assemblies in Spain expired four years after the date of their previous election. The election decree was required to be issued no later than the day after the expiration date of the assemblies, with election day taking place 65 days after the decree's publication in the Official State Gazette (BOE).

Elections to the assemblies of local entities were officially called on 27 January 1979 with the publication of the corresponding decree in the BOE, setting election day for 3 April.

=== Electoral system ===
Voting for local assemblies was based on universal suffrage, comprising all Spanish nationals over 18 years of age, registered and residing in the municipality and with full civil and political rights.

Local councillors were elected using the D'Hondt method and closed-list proportional voting, with a five percent-threshold of valid votes (including blank ballots) in each municipality. Each municipality was a multi-member constituency, with a number of seats based on the following scale:

Population	Councillors
<250	5
251–1,000	7
1,001–2,000	9
2,001–5,000	11
5,001–10,000	13
10,001–20,000	17
20,001–50,000	21
50,001–100,000	25
>100,001	+1 per each 100,000 inhabitants or fraction +1 if total is an even number

The law did not provide for by-elections to fill vacant seats; instead, any vacancies arising after the proclamation of candidates and during the legislative term were filled by the next candidates on the party lists or, when required, by designated substitutes.

== Parties and candidates ==
The electoral law allowed for parties and federations registered in the interior ministry, alliances and groupings of electors to present lists of candidates. Parties and federations intending to form an alliance were required to inform the relevant electoral commission within 10 days of the election call, whereas groupings of electors needed to secure the signature of a determined amount of the electors registered in the municipality for which they sought election, disallowing electors from signing for more than one list. In the case of Seville, as its population was between 300,001 and 1,000,000, at least 2,000 signatures were required.

Below is a list of the main parties and alliances which contested the election:

Candidacy	Parties and alliances	Leading candidate	Ideology	Gov.	Ref.
UCD	List: Union of the Democratic Centre (UCD)	Rafael López Palanco	Centrism	No	
PSOE	List: Spanish Socialist Workers' Party (PSOE)	Antonio Rodríguez Almodóvar	Social democracy	No	
PSA–PA	List: Socialist Party of Andalusia–Andalusian Party (PSA–PA)	Luis Uruñuela	Andalusian nationalism Socialism; Marxism	No	
PCE	List: Communist Party of Spain (PCE)	Alonso Balosa	Eurocommunism	No	

== Results ==
Summary of the 3 April 1979 City Council of Seville election results →
Parties and alliances	Popular vote			Seats	
Parties and alliances	Votes	%	±pp	Total	+/−
Union of the Democratic Centre (UCD)	65,725	27.09	n/a	9	n/a
Spanish Socialist Workers' Party (PSOE)	60,116	24.78	n/a	8	n/a
Socialist Party of Andalusia–Andalusian Party (PSA–PA)	56,957	23.48	n/a	8	n/a
Communist Party of Spain (PCE)	44,704	18.43	n/a	6	n/a
Party of Labour of Andalusia (PTA)	3,747	1.54	n/a	0	n/a
Democratic Coalition (CD)	2,850	1.17	n/a	0	n/a
New Force (FN)	2,243	0.92	n/a	0	n/a
Communist Organization of Spain (Red Flag) (OCE–BR)	1,745	0.72	n/a	0	n/a
Spanish Communist Workers' Party (PCOE)	1,576	0.65	n/a	0	n/a
Communist Unification of Spain (UCE)	982	0.40	n/a	0	n/a
Spanish Socialist Workers' Party (historical) (PSOEh)	891	0.37	n/a	0	n/a
Revolutionary Communist League (LCR)	456	0.19	n/a	0	n/a
Communist Movement–Organization of Communist Left (MCA–OIC)	290	0.12	n/a	0	n/a
Workers' Revolutionary Organization (ORT)	0	0.00	n/a	0	n/a
Blank ballots	325	0.13	n/a		
Total	242,607			31	n/a
Valid votes	242,607	99.50	n/a		
Invalid votes	1,220	0.50	n/a		
Votes cast / turnout	243,827	56.98	n/a		
Abstentions	184,124	43.02	n/a		
Registered voters	427,951				

Popular vote
UCD	27.09%
PSOE	24.78%
PSA–PA	23.48%
PCE	18.43%
PTA	1.54%
CD	1.17%
Others	3.37%
Blank ballots	0.13%

Seats
UCD	29.03%
PSOE	25.81%
PSA–PA	25.81%
PCE	19.35%

== Aftermath ==
=== Government formation ===
Investiture
Ballot →	21 April 1979	
Required majority →	16 out of 31	
Luis Uruñuela (PSA): • PSA (8); • PSOE (8); • PCE (6)	22 / 31	check
Rafael López Palanco (UCD): • UCD (9)	9 / 31	X mark
Abstentions/Blank ballots	0 / 31	
Absentees	0 / 31	

== Bibliography ==
- Ley 41/1975, de 19 de noviembre, de Bases del Estatuto de Régimen Local (Law 41/1975). Official State Gazette (in Spanish). 19 November 1975. BOE-A-1975-23920.
- Ley 39/1978, de 17 de julio, de elecciones locales (Law 39/1978). Official State Gazette (in Spanish). 17 July 1978. BOE-A-1978-18636.
- Constitución Española (Constitution). Official State Gazette (in Spanish). 27 December 1978 [version as of 29 December 1978]. BOE-A-1978-31229.
- Real Decreto 117/1979, de 26 de enero, de convocatoria de Elecciones Locales (Royal Decree 117/1979). Official State Gazette (in Spanish). 26 January 1979. BOE-A-1979-2570.
