= 1979 Spanish local elections in Catalonia =

This article presents the results breakdown of the local elections held in Catalonia on 3 April 1979. The following tables show detailed results in the autonomous community's most populous municipalities, sorted alphabetically.

== City control ==
The following table lists party control in the most populous municipalities, including provincial capitals (highlighted in bold).

Municipality	Population	New control
Badalona	229,780	Unified Socialist Party of Catalonia (PSUC)
**Barcelona**	1,754,579	Socialists' Party of Catalonia (PSC–PSOE)
Cornellá	91,563	Unified Socialist Party of Catalonia (PSUC)
**Gerona**	83,929	Socialists' Party of Catalonia (PSC–PSOE)
Hospitalet	289,747	Socialists' Party of Catalonia (PSC–PSOE)
**Lérida**	106,190	Socialists' Party of Catalonia (PSC–PSOE)
Mataró	96,942	Socialists' Party of Catalonia (PSC–PSOE)
Reus	82,407	Socialists' Party of Catalonia (PSC–PSOE)
Sabadell	187,247	Unified Socialist Party of Catalonia (PSUC)
Sant Boi de Llobregat	72,926	Socialists' Party of Catalonia (PSC–PSOE)
Sant Cugat del Vallès	31,748	Socialists' Party of Catalonia (PSC–PSOE)
Santa Coloma de Gramanet	140,613	Unified Socialist Party of Catalonia (PSUC)
**Tarragona**	108,131	Socialists' Party of Catalonia (PSC–PSOE)
Tarrasa	157,442	Socialists' Party of Catalonia (PSC–PSOE)

== Municipalities ==
=== Badalona ===
Population: 229,780

Summary of the 3 April 1979 City Council of Badalona election results →
Parties and alliances	Popular vote			Seats	
Parties and alliances	Votes	%	±pp	Total	+/−
Unified Socialist Party of Catalonia (PSUC)	29,976	34.89	n/a	12	n/a
Socialists' Party of Catalonia (PSC–PSOE)	26,674	31.05	n/a	10	n/a
Convergence and Union (CiU)	9,212	10.72	n/a	3	n/a
Centrists of Catalonia (CC–UCD)	7,419	8.64	n/a	2	n/a
Union of Citizens of Badalona (UCBGI)	2,952	3.44	n/a	0	n/a
Workers' Party of Catalonia–Communist Unity (PTC–UC)	2,937	3.42	n/a	0	n/a
Agreement of Independents for Badalona (EI)	2,312	2.69	n/a	0	n/a
Republican Left of Catalonia–National Front of Catalonia (ERC–FNC)	1,586	1.85	n/a	0	n/a
Communists of Catalonia (ComC)	1,536	1.79	n/a	0	n/a
Communist Movement–Organization of Communist Left (MC–OEC)	638	0.74	n/a	0	n/a
Revolutionary Communist League (LCR)	404	0.47	n/a	0	n/a
Workers' Revolutionary Organization (ORT)	0	0.00	n/a	0	n/a
Democratic Coalition (CD)	0	0.00	n/a	0	n/a
Blank ballots	263	0.31	n/a		
Total	85,909			27	n/a
Valid votes	85,909	99.48	n/a		
Invalid votes	447	0.52	n/a		
Votes cast / turnout	86,356	59.40	n/a		
Abstentions	59,013	40.60	n/a		
Registered voters	145,369				

=== Barcelona ===
Population: 1,754,579

=== Cornellá ===
Population: 91,563

Summary of the 3 April 1979 City Council of Cornellá election results →
Parties and alliances	Popular vote			Seats	
Parties and alliances	Votes	%	±pp	Total	+/−
Unified Socialist Party of Catalonia (PSUC)	18,659	46.21	n/a	13	n/a
Socialists' Party of Catalonia (PSC–PSOE)	12,937	32.04	n/a	9	n/a
Centrists of Catalonia (CC–UCD)	2,940	7.28	n/a	2	n/a
Convergence and Union (CiU)	2,621	6.49	n/a	1	n/a
Workers' Party of Catalonia–Communist Unity (PTC–UC)	1,169	2.89	n/a	0	n/a
Independents (INDEP)	853	2.11	n/a	0	n/a
Communists of Catalonia (ComC)	595	1.47	n/a	0	n/a
Communist Movement–Organization of Communist Left (MC–OEC)	351	0.87	n/a	0	n/a
Spanish Phalanx of the CNSO (FE–JONS)	165	0.41	n/a	0	n/a
Workers' Revolutionary Organization (ORT)	0	0.00	n/a	0	n/a
Blank ballots	90	0.22	n/a		
Total	40,380			25	n/a
Valid votes	40,380	99.47	n/a		
Invalid votes	216	0.53	n/a		
Votes cast / turnout	40,596	64.01	n/a		
Abstentions	22,828	35.99	n/a		
Registered voters	63,424				

=== Gerona ===
Population: 83,929

Summary of the 3 April 1979 City Council of Gerona election results →
Parties and alliances	Popular vote			Seats	
Parties and alliances	Votes	%	±pp	Total	+/−
Socialists' Party of Catalonia (PSC–PSOE)	11,746	31.98	n/a	9	n/a
Convergence and Union (CiU)	9,284	25.27	n/a	7	n/a
Centrists of Catalonia (CC–UCD)	7,674	20.89	n/a	5	n/a
Unified Socialist Party of Catalonia (PSUC)	6,061	16.50	n/a	4	n/a
Communists of Catalonia (ComC)	1,384	3.77	n/a	0	n/a
Workers' Party of Catalonia–Communist Unity (PTC–UC)	474	1.29	n/a	0	n/a
Blank ballots	110	0.30	n/a		
Total	36,733			25	n/a
Valid votes	36,733	99.48	n/a		
Invalid votes	191	0.52	n/a		
Votes cast / turnout	36,924	64.49	n/a		
Abstentions	20,331	35.51	n/a		
Registered voters	57,255				

=== Hospitalet ===
Population: 289,747

Summary of the 3 April 1979 City Council of Hospitalet election results →
Parties and alliances	Popular vote			Seats	
Parties and alliances	Votes	%	±pp	Total	+/−
Socialists' Party of Catalonia (PSC–PSOE)	48,687	41.09	n/a	12	n/a
Unified Socialist Party of Catalonia (PSUC)	41,457	34.99	n/a	11	n/a
Centrists of Catalonia (CC–UCD)	10,581	8.93	n/a	2	n/a
Convergence and Union (CiU)	8,783	7.41	n/a	2	n/a
Workers' Party of Catalonia–Communist Unity (PTC–UC)	3,918	3.31	n/a	0	n/a
Communists of Catalonia (ComC)	2,135	1.80	n/a	0	n/a
Republican Left of Catalonia–National Front of Catalonia (ERC–FNC)	1,842	1.55	n/a	0	n/a
Communist Movement–Organization of Communist Left (MC–OEC)	672	0.57	n/a	0	n/a
Workers' Revolutionary Organization (ORT)	0	0.00	n/a	0	n/a
Democratic Coalition (CD)	0	0.00	n/a	0	n/a
Blank ballots	405	0.34	n/a		
Total	118,480			27	n/a
Valid votes	118,480	99.50	n/a		
Invalid votes	590	0.50	n/a		
Votes cast / turnout	119,070	58.58	n/a		
Abstentions	84,886	41.62	n/a		
Registered voters	203,956				

=== Lérida ===
Population: 106,190

Summary of the 3 April 1979 City Council of Lérida election results →
Parties and alliances	Popular vote			Seats	
Parties and alliances	Votes	%	±pp	Total	+/−
Socialists' Party of Catalonia (PSC–PSOE)	12,593	31.25	n/a	9	n/a
Centrists of Catalonia (CC–UCD)	10,157	25.21	n/a	8	n/a
Unified Socialist Party of Catalonia (PSUC)	7,214	17.90	n/a	5	n/a
Convergence and Union (CiU)	4,759	11.81	n/a	3	n/a
Republican Left of Catalonia (ERC)	2,914	7.23	n/a	2	n/a
Workers' Party of Catalonia–Communist Unity (PTC–UC)	1,217	3.02	n/a	0	n/a
Democratic Coalition (CD)	1,003	2.49	n/a	0	n/a
Carlist Party of Catalonia (PCdC)	307	0.76	n/a	9	n/a
Blank ballots	130	0.32	n/a		
Total	40,294			27	n/a
Valid votes	40,294	99.36	n/a		
Invalid votes	258	0.64	n/a		
Votes cast / turnout	40,552	52.43	n/a		
Abstentions	36,787	47.57	n/a		
Registered voters	77,339				

=== Mataró ===
Population: 96,942

Summary of the 3 April 1979 City Council of Mataró election results →
Parties and alliances	Popular vote			Seats	
Parties and alliances	Votes	%	±pp	Total	+/−
Socialists' Party of Catalonia (PSC–PSOE)	14,078	31.36	n/a	8	n/a
Unified Socialist Party of Catalonia (PSUC)	12,093	26.94	n/a	7	n/a
Convergence and Union (CiU)	11,587	25.81	n/a	7	n/a
Centrists of Catalonia (CC–UCD)	5,580	12.43	n/a	3	n/a
Republican Left of Catalonia–National Front of Catalonia (ERC–FNC)	1,444	3.22	n/a	0	n/a
Blank ballots	111	0.25	n/a		
Total	44,893			25	n/a
Valid votes	44,893	99.69	n/a		
Invalid votes	138	0.31	n/a		
Votes cast / turnout	45,031	65.72	n/a		
Abstentions	23,492	34.28	n/a		
Registered voters	68,523				

=== Reus ===
Population: 82,407

Summary of the 3 April 1979 City Council of Reus election results →
Parties and alliances	Popular vote			Seats	
Parties and alliances	Votes	%	±pp	Total	+/−
Socialists' Party of Catalonia (PSC–PSOE)	9,512	31.26	n/a	9	n/a
Convergence and Union (CiU)	6,468	21.26	n/a	6	n/a
Unified Socialist Party of Catalonia (PSUC)	5,110	16.79	n/a	4	n/a
Centrists of Catalonia (CC–UCD)	4,978	16.36	n/a	4	n/a
Republican Left of Catalonia–National Front of Catalonia (ERC–FNC)	2,445	8.04	n/a	2	n/a
Conservatives of Catalonia (CiC)	686	2.25	n/a	0	n/a
Workers' Party of Catalonia–Communist Unity (PTC–UC)	546	1.79	n/a	0	n/a
Democratic Coalition (CD)	503	1.65	n/a	0	n/a
Workers' Revolutionary Organization (ORT)	109	0.36	n/a	0	n/a
Blank ballots	70	0.23	n/a		
Total	30,427			25	n/a
Valid votes	30,427	99.53	n/a		
Invalid votes	143	0.47	n/a		
Votes cast / turnout	30,570	53.71	n/a		
Abstentions	26,343	46.29	n/a		
Registered voters	56,913				

=== Sabadell ===
Population: 187,247

Summary of the 3 April 1979 City Council of Sabadell election results →
Parties and alliances	Popular vote			Seats	
Parties and alliances	Votes	%	±pp	Total	+/−
Unified Socialist Party of Catalonia (PSUC)	37,590	43.52	n/a	13	n/a
Socialists' Party of Catalonia (PSC–PSOE)	17,820	20.63	n/a	6	n/a
Convergence and Union (CiU)	16,869	19.53	n/a	6	n/a
Centrists of Catalonia (CC–UCD)	7,460	8.64	n/a	2	n/a
Communist Movement–Organization of Communist Left (MC–OEC)	1,510	1.75	n/a	0	n/a
Republican Left of Catalonia–National Front of Catalonia (ERC–FNC)	1,256	1.45	n/a	0	n/a
Liberal Party of Catalonia (PLC)	1,155	1.34	n/a	0	n/a
Popular Unity Candidacy (CUP)	1,033	1.20	n/a	0	n/a
Workers' Party of Catalonia–Communist Unity (PTC–UC)	823	0.95	n/a	0	n/a
Republican Left (IR)	645	0.75	n/a	0	n/a
Blank ballots	223	0.26	n/a		
Total	86,384			27	n/a
Valid votes	86,384	99.62	n/a		
Invalid votes	333	0.38	n/a		
Votes cast / turnout	86,717	66.91	n/a		
Abstentions	42,884	33.09	n/a		
Registered voters	129,601				

=== Sant Boi de Llobregat ===
Population: 72,926

Summary of the 3 April 1979 City Council of Sant Boi de Llobregat election results →
Parties and alliances	Popular vote			Seats	
Parties and alliances	Votes	%	±pp	Total	+/−
Socialists' Party of Catalonia (PSC–PSOE)	10,036	35.36	n/a	10	n/a
Unified Socialist Party of Catalonia (PSUC)	9,626	33.91	n/a	9	n/a
Convergence and Union (CiU)	3,487	12.28	n/a	3	n/a
Centrists of Catalonia (CC–UCD)	2,452	8.64	n/a	2	n/a
Socialist Party of National Liberation (PSAN)	1,434	5.05	n/a	1	n/a
Workers' Party of Catalonia–Communist Unity (PTC–UC)	874	3.08	n/a	0	n/a
Spanish Phalanx of the CNSO (FE–JONS)	408	1.44	n/a	0	n/a
Blank ballots	68	0.24	n/a		
Total	28,385			25	n/a
Valid votes	28,385	99.57	n/a		
Invalid votes	122	0.43	n/a		
Votes cast / turnout	28,507	61.48	n/a		
Abstentions	17,861	38.52	n/a		
Registered voters	46,368				

=== Sant Cugat del Vallès ===
Population: 31,748

Summary of the 3 April 1979 City Council of Sant Cugat del Vallès election results →
Parties and alliances	Popular vote			Seats	
Parties and alliances	Votes	%	±pp	Total	+/−
Socialists' Party of Catalonia (PSC–PSOE)	3,525	30.20	n/a	7	n/a
Convergence and Union (CiU)	2,595	22.23	n/a	5	n/a
Unified Socialist Party of Catalonia (PSUC)	2,266	19.42	n/a	4	n/a
Centrists of Catalonia (CC–UCD)	1,512	12.96	n/a	3	n/a
Independents for Sant Cugat (ISC)	771	6.61	n/a	1	n/a
Republican Left of Catalonia–National Front of Catalonia (ERC–FNC)	673	5.77	n/a	1	n/a
Catalan Left Bloc (BEC)	252	2.16	n/a	0	n/a
Communist Movement–Organization of Communist Left (MC–OEC)	53	0.45	n/a	0	n/a
Blank ballots	24	0.21	n/a		
Total	11,671			21	n/a
Valid votes	11,671	99.67	n/a		
Invalid votes	39	0.33	n/a		
Votes cast / turnout	11,710	53.42	n/a		
Abstentions	10,212	46.58	n/a		
Registered voters	21,922				

=== Santa Coloma de Gramanet ===
Population: 140,613

Summary of the 3 April 1979 City Council of Santa Coloma de Gramanet election results →
Parties and alliances	Popular vote			Seats	
Parties and alliances	Votes	%	±pp	Total	+/−
Unified Socialist Party of Catalonia (PSUC)	26,065	45.31	n/a	13	n/a
Socialists' Party of Catalonia (PSC–PSOE)	20,801	36.16	n/a	11	n/a
Convergence and Union (CiU)	3,828	6.65	n/a	2	n/a
Centrists of Catalonia (CC–UCD)	3,226	5.61	n/a	1	n/a
Communist Movement–Organization of Communist Left (MC–OEC)	1,158	2.01	n/a	0	n/a
Workers' Party of Catalonia–Communist Unity (PTC–UC)	1,104	1.92	n/a	0	n/a
Communists of Catalonia (ComC)	1,068	1.86	n/a	0	n/a
Revolutionary Communist League (LCR)	163	0.28	n/a	0	n/a
Blank ballots	119	0.21	n/a		
Total	57,532			27	n/a
Valid votes	57,532	99.68	n/a		
Invalid votes	187	0.32	n/a		
Votes cast / turnout	57,719	61.89	n/a		
Abstentions	35,539	38.11	n/a		
Registered voters	93,258				

=== Tarragona ===
Population: 108,131

Summary of the 3 April 1979 City Council of Tarragona election results →
Parties and alliances	Popular vote			Seats	
Parties and alliances	Votes	%	±pp	Total	+/−
Socialists' Party of Catalonia (PSC–PSOE)	10,912	25.88	n/a	8	n/a
Unified Socialist Party of Catalonia (PSUC)	9,136	21.67	n/a	6	n/a
Centrists of Catalonia (CC–UCD)	8,545	20.26	n/a	6	n/a
Convergence and Union (CiU)	6,021	14.28	n/a	4	n/a
Candidacy for the Neighbours' Participation in the City Council (CPV)	2,832	6.72	n/a	2	n/a
Republican Left of Catalonia–National Front of Catalonia (ERC–FNC)	2,138	5.07	n/a	1	n/a
Democratic Coalition (CD)	1,098	2.60	n/a	0	n/a
Workers' Revolutionary Organization (ORT)	689	1.63	n/a	0	n/a
Communist Movement–Organization of Communist Left (MC–OEC)	508	1.20	n/a	0	n/a
Workers' Party of Catalonia–Communist Unity (PTC–UC)	158	0.37	n/a	0	n/a
Blank ballots	131	0.31	n/a		
Total	42,168			27	n/a
Valid votes	42,168	99.38	n/a		
Invalid votes	264	0.62	n/a		
Votes cast / turnout	42,432	56.68	n/a		
Abstentions	32,429	43.32	n/a		
Registered voters	74,861				

=== Tarrasa ===
Population: 157,442

Summary of the 3 April 1979 City Council of Tarrasa election results →
Parties and alliances	Popular vote			Seats	
Parties and alliances	Votes	%	±pp	Total	+/−
Socialists' Party of Catalonia (PSC–PSOE)	22,244	30.67	n/a	10	n/a
Unified Socialist Party of Catalonia (PSUC)	22,066	30.43	n/a	9	n/a
Convergence and Union (CiU)	10,877	15.00	n/a	4	n/a
Centrists of Catalonia (CC–UCD)	10,365	14.29	n/a	4	n/a
Democratic Coalition (CD)	2,266	3.12	n/a	0	n/a
Republican Left of Catalonia–National Front of Catalonia (ERC–FNC)	1,860	2.56	n/a	0	n/a
Revolutionary Communist League (LCR)	1,105	1.52	n/a	0	n/a
Communist Unity Group of Terrassa (AUCT)	1,031	1.42	n/a	0	n/a
Workers' Revolutionary Organization (ORT)	504	0.70	n/a	0	n/a
Workers' Party of Catalonia–Communist Unity (PTC–UC)	0	0.00	n/a	0	n/a
Blank ballots	199	0.27	n/a		
Total	72,517			27	n/a
Valid votes	72,517	99.69	n/a		
Invalid votes	222	0.31	n/a		
Votes cast / turnout	72,739	63.79	n/a		
Abstentions	41,298	36.21	n/a		
Registered voters	114,037				
