= Santiago Cid Harguindey =

Spanish politician (1944–2021)

Mayor of Verín
- In office 1983–1991
- Preceded by: Carmen Lovelle
- Succeeded by: Emilio González Afonso

Personal details
- Born: 1944 Verín, Spain
- Died: 4 June 2021 (aged 76–77) Verín, Spain
- Party: UCD

Santiago Cid Harguindey (1944 – 4 June 2021) was a Spanish politician.

== Biography ==
Harguindey co-founded the football club Verín CF in 1971. Following the fall of the Francoist regime, he was appointed to be the municipal manager of Verín by Carmen Lovelle. As a member of the Union of the Democratic Centre (UCD), he was elected to the municipal council of Verín in 1979 and became vice-president of the Diputación Provincial de Orense. In the 1983 election, he became Mayor of Verín after gaining support from the Galician Coalition. In 1987, he was re-elected with support from the Centrists of Galicia. In 1990, he was charged with prevarication and was ousted in a no-confidence vote on 17 October 1991. He was succeeded by Emilio González Afonso.

Santiago Cid Harguindey died on 4 June 2021 at the age of 76.
