= 1983 Spanish local elections in Catalonia =

This article presents the results breakdown of the local elections held in Catalonia on 8 May 1983. The following tables show detailed results in the autonomous community's most populous municipalities, sorted alphabetically.

== City control ==
The following table lists party control in the most populous municipalities, including provincial capitals (highlighted in bold). Gains for a party are highlighted in that party's colour.

Municipality	Population	Previous control	New control
Badalona	231,175	Unified Socialist Party of Catalonia (PSUC)	Socialists' Party of Catalonia (PSC–PSOE)
**Barcelona**	1,771,998	Socialists' Party of Catalonia (PSC–PSOE)	Socialists' Party of Catalonia (PSC–PSOE)
Cornellá	91,313	Unified Socialist Party of Catalonia (PSUC)	Unified Socialist Party of Catalonia (PSUC) (PSC–PSOE in 1985)
**Gerona**	65,586	Socialists' Party of Catalonia (PSC–PSOE)	Socialists' Party of Catalonia (PSC–PSOE)
Hospitalet	291,066	Socialists' Party of Catalonia (PSC–PSOE)	Socialists' Party of Catalonia (PSC–PSOE)
**Lérida**	109,397	Socialists' Party of Catalonia (PSC–PSOE)	Socialists' Party of Catalonia (PSC–PSOE)
Mataró	98,589	Socialists' Party of Catalonia (PSC–PSOE)	Socialists' Party of Catalonia (PSC–PSOE)
Reus	81,182	Socialists' Party of Catalonia (PSC–PSOE)	Socialists' Party of Catalonia (PSC–PSOE)
Sabadell	189,147	Unified Socialist Party of Catalonia (PSUC)	Unified Socialist Party of Catalonia (PSUC)
Sant Boi de Llobregat	74,291	Socialists' Party of Catalonia (PSC–PSOE)	Socialists' Party of Catalonia (PSC–PSOE)
Sant Cugat del Vallès	32,076	Socialists' Party of Catalonia (PSC–PSOE)	Socialists' Party of Catalonia (PSC–PSOE)
Santa Coloma de Gramanet	139,859	Unified Socialist Party of Catalonia (PSUC)	Unified Socialist Party of Catalonia (PSUC)
**Tarragona**	112,238	Socialists' Party of Catalonia (PSC–PSOE)	Socialists' Party of Catalonia (PSC–PSOE)
Tarrasa	164,218	Socialists' Party of Catalonia (PSC–PSOE)	Socialists' Party of Catalonia (PSC–PSOE)

== Municipalities ==
=== Badalona ===
Population: 231,175

← Summary of the 8 May 1983 City Council of Badalona election results →
Parties and alliances	Popular vote			Seats	
Parties and alliances	Votes	%	±pp	Total	+/−
Socialists' Party of Catalonia (PSC–PSOE)	39,093	39.39	+8.34	12	+2
Unified Socialist Party of Catalonia (PSUC)	35,926	36.20	+1.31	11	−1
Convergence and Union (CiU)	10,118	10.19	−0.53	3	±0
People's Coalition (AP–PDP–UL)^{1}	6,208	6.26	+6.26	1	+1
Party of the Communists of Catalonia (PCC)	3,947	3.98	New	0	±0
Republican Left of Catalonia (ERC)	1,973	1.99	+0.14	0	±0
United Left of Badalona (EUB)	1,068	1.08	New	0	±0
Workers' Socialist Party (PST)	645	0.65	New	0	±0
Centrists of Catalonia (CC–UCD)	n/a	n/a	−8.64	0	−2
Blank ballots	269	0.27	−0.04		
Total	99,247			27	±0
Valid votes	99,247	99.20	−0.28		
Invalid votes	799	0.80	+0.28		
Votes cast / turnout	100,046	62.55	+3.15		
Abstentions	59,909	37.45	−3.15		
Registered voters	159,955				
Sources
Footnotes: ^{1} People's Coalition results are compared to Democratic Coalition totals in the 1979 election.

=== Barcelona ===
Population: 1,771,998

=== Cornellá ===
Population: 91,313

← Summary of the 8 May 1983 City Council of Cornellá election results →
Parties and alliances	Popular vote			Seats	
Parties and alliances	Votes	%	±pp	Total	+/−
Socialists' Party of Catalonia (PSC–PSOE)	17,576	42.44	+10.40	11	+2
Unified Socialist Party of Catalonia (PSUC)	16,319	39.40	−6.81	11	−2
Convergence and Union (CiU)	2,901	7.00	+0.51	1	±0
People's Coalition (AP–PDP–UL)	2,411	5.82	New	1	+1
Party of the Communists of Catalonia (PCC)	2,102	5.08	New	1	+1
Centrists of Catalonia (CC–UCD)	n/a	n/a	−7.28	0	−2
Blank ballots	107	0.26	+0.04		
Total	41,416			25	±0
Valid votes	41,416	98.69	−0.78		
Invalid votes	551	1.31	+0.78		
Votes cast / turnout	41,967	64.56	+0.55		
Abstentions	23,040	35.44	−0.55		
Registered voters	65,007				

=== Gerona ===
Population: 65,586

← Summary of the 8 May 1983 City Council of Gerona election results →
Parties and alliances	Popular vote			Seats	
Parties and alliances	Votes	%	±pp	Total	+/−
Socialists' Party of Catalonia (PSC–PSOE)	16,554	51.73	+19.75	15	+6
Convergence and Union (CiU)	7,202	22.51	−2.76	6	−1
People's Coalition (AP–PDP–UL)	3,772	11.79	New	3	+3
Unified Socialist Party of Catalonia (PSUC)	1,842	5.76	−10.74	1	−3
Republican Left of Catalonia (ERC)	1,570	4.91	New	0	±0
Democratic and Social Centre (CDS)	584	1.83	New	0	±0
Party of the Communists of Catalonia (PCC)	346	1.08	New	0	±0
Centrists of Catalonia (CC–UCD)	n/a	n/a	−20.89	0	−5
Blank ballots	128	0.40	+0.10		
Total	31,998			25	±0
Valid votes	31,998	98.98	−0.50		
Invalid votes	330	1.02	+0.50		
Votes cast / turnout	32,328	69.69	+5.20		
Abstentions	14,058	30.31	−5.20		
Registered voters	46,386				

=== Hospitalet ===
Population: 291,066

← Summary of the 8 May 1983 City Council of Hospitalet election results →
Parties and alliances	Popular vote			Seats	
Parties and alliances	Votes	%	±pp	Total	+/−
Socialists' Party of Catalonia (PSC–PSOE)	86,128	64.69	+23.60	20	+8
Unified Socialist Party of Catalonia (PSUC)	16,835	12.64	−22.35	3	−8
Convergence and Union (CiU)	11,442	8.59	+1.18	2	±0
People's Coalition (AP–PDP–UL)^{1}	10,727	8.06	+8.06	2	+2
Party of the Communists of Catalonia (PCC)	3,353	2.52	New	0	±0
Republican Left of Catalonia (ERC)	2,004	1.51	New	0	±0
Democratic and Social Centre (CDS)	1,320	0.99	New	0	±0
Workers' Socialist Party (PST)	503	0.38	New	0	±0
Communist League (LC)	387	0.29	New	0	±0
Centrists of Catalonia (CC–UCD)	n/a	n/a	−8.93	0	−2
Blank ballots	440	0.33	−0.01		
Total	133,139			27	±0
Valid votes	133,139	98.18	−1.32		
Invalid votes	2,463	1.82	+1.32		
Votes cast / turnout	135,602	63.95	+5.37		
Abstentions	76,455	36.05	−5.37		
Registered voters	212,057				
Sources
Footnotes: ^{1} People's Coalition results are compared to Democratic Coalition totals in the 1979 election.

=== Lérida ===
Population: 109,397

← Summary of the 8 May 1983 City Council of Lérida election results →
Parties and alliances	Popular vote			Seats	
Parties and alliances	Votes	%	±pp	Total	+/−
Socialists' Party of Catalonia (PSC–PSOE)	25,678	54.18	+22.93	17	+8
Convergence and Union (CiU)	7,894	16.66	+4.85	5	+2
People's Coalition (AP–PDP–UL)^{1}	7,622	16.08	+13.59	5	+5
Unified Socialist Party of Catalonia (PSUC)	1,878	3.96	−13.94	0	−5
Republican Left of Catalonia (ERC)	1,659	3.50	−3.73	0	−2
Democratic and Social Centre (CDS)	1,382	2.92	New	0	±0
Party of the Communists of Catalonia (PCC)	1,086	2.29	New	0	±0
Centrists of Catalonia (CC–UCD)	n/a	n/a	−25.21	0	−8
Blank ballots	197	0.42	+0.10		
Total	47,396			27	±0
Valid votes	47,396	98.58	−0.78		
Invalid votes	681	1.42	+0.78		
Votes cast / turnout	48,077	61.10	+8.67		
Abstentions	30,608	38.90	−8.67		
Registered voters	78,685				
Sources
Footnotes: ^{1} People's Coalition results are compared to Democratic Coalition totals in the 1979 election.

=== Mataró ===
Population: 98,589

← Summary of the 8 May 1983 City Council of Mataró election results →
Parties and alliances	Popular vote			Seats	
Parties and alliances	Votes	%	±pp	Total	+/−
Socialists' Party of Catalonia (PSC–PSOE)	24,523	51.64	+20.28	15	+7
Convergence and Union (CiU)	11,133	23.45	−2.36	6	−1
People's Coalition (AP–PDP–UL)	3,974	8.37	New	2	+2
Unified Socialist Party of Catalonia (PSUC)	3,272	6.89	−20.05	2	−5
Republican Left of Catalonia (ERC)	2,038	4.29	+1.07	0	±0
Party of the Communists of Catalonia (PCC)	1,720	3.62	New	0	±0
Democratic and Social Centre (CDS)	664	1.40	New	0	±0
Centrists of Catalonia (CC–UCD)	n/a	n/a	−12.43	0	−3
Blank ballots	161	0.34	+0.09		
Total	47,485			25	±0
Valid votes	47,485	98.87	−0.82		
Invalid votes	541	1.13	+0.82		
Votes cast / turnout	48,026	69.94	+4.22		
Abstentions	20,638	30.06	−4.22		
Registered voters	68,664				

=== Reus ===
Population: 81,182

← Summary of the 8 May 1983 City Council of Reus election results →
Parties and alliances	Popular vote			Seats	
Parties and alliances	Votes	%	±pp	Total	+/−
Socialists' Party of Catalonia (PSC–PSOE)	14,506	43.47	+12.21	12	+3
Convergence and Union (CiU)	7,962	23.86	+2.60	6	±0
People's Coalition (AP–PDP–UL)^{1}	4,541	13.61	+11.96	3	+3
Republican Left of Catalonia (ERC)	2,685	8.05	+0.01	2	±0
Unified Socialist Party of Catalonia (PSUC)	2,383	7.14	−9.65	2	−2
Party of the Communists of Catalonia (PCC)	832	2.49	New	0	±0
Democratic and Social Centre (CDS)	358	1.07	New	0	±0
Centrists of Catalonia (CC–UCD)	n/a	n/a	−16.36	0	−4
Blank ballots	103	0.31	+0.08		
Total	33,370			25	±0
Valid votes	33,370	98.98	−0.55		
Invalid votes	343	1.02	+0.55		
Votes cast / turnout	33,713	55.79	+2.08		
Abstentions	26,712	44.21	−2.08		
Registered voters	60,425				
Sources
Footnotes: ^{1} People's Coalition results are compared to Democratic Coalition totals in the 1979 election.

=== Sabadell ===
Population: 189,147

← Summary of the 8 May 1983 City Council of Sabadell election results →
Parties and alliances	Popular vote			Seats	
Parties and alliances	Votes	%	±pp	Total	+/−
Unified Socialist Party of Catalonia (PSUC)	48,426	51.33	+7.81	15	+2
Convergence and Union (CiU)	18,002	19.08	−0.45	5	−1
Socialists' Party of Catalonia (PSC–PSOE)	16,402	17.39	−3.24	5	−1
People's Coalition (AP–PDP–UL)	6,288	6.67	New	2	+2
Party of the Communists of Catalonia (PCC)	2,888	3.06	New	0	±0
Republican Left of Catalonia (ERC)	1,631	1.73	+0.28	0	±0
Workers' Socialist Party (PST)	291	0.31	New	0	±0
Popular Struggle Coalition (CLP)	151	0.16	New	0	±0
Communist League (LC)	1	0.00	New	0	±0
Centrists of Catalonia (CC–UCD)	n/a	n/a	−8.64	0	−2
Blank ballots	256	0.27	+0.01		
Total	94,336			27	±0
Valid votes	94,336	99.56	−0.06		
Invalid votes	420	0.44	+0.06		
Votes cast / turnout	94,756	70.08	+3.17		
Abstentions	40,452	29.92	−3.17		
Registered voters	135,208				

=== Sant Boi de Llobregat ===
Population: 74,291

← Summary of the 8 May 1983 City Council of Sant Boi de Llobregat election results →
Parties and alliances	Popular vote			Seats	
Parties and alliances	Votes	%	±pp	Total	+/−
Socialists' Party of Catalonia (PSC–PSOE)	21,585	64.06	+28.70	18	+8
Convergence and Union (CiU)	4,010	11.90	−0.38	3	±0
Unified Socialist Party of Catalonia (PSUC)	3,884	11.53	−22.38	3	−6
People's Coalition (AP–PDP–UL)	1,758	5.22	New	1	+3
Party of the Communists of Catalonia (PCC)	989	2.94	New	0	±0
Republican Left of Catalonia (ERC)	746	2.21	New	0	±0
Participation of Workers and Neighbours (IND)	416	1.23	New	0	±0
Communist League (LC)	226	0.67	New	0	±0
Centrists of Catalonia (CC–UCD)	n/a	n/a	−8.64	0	−2
Socialist Party of National Liberation (PSAN)	n/a	n/a	−5.05	0	−1
Blank ballots	81	0.24	±0.00		
Total	33,695			25	±0
Valid votes	33,695	97.99	−1.58		
Invalid votes	690	2.01	+1.58		
Votes cast / turnout	34,385	67.08	+5.60		
Abstentions	16,872	32.92	−5.60		
Registered voters	51,257				

=== Sant Cugat del Vallès ===
Population: 32,076

← Summary of the 8 May 1983 City Council of Sant Cugat del Vallès election results →
Parties and alliances	Popular vote			Seats	
Parties and alliances	Votes	%	±pp	Total	+/−
Socialists' Party of Catalonia (PSC–PSOE)	6,230	41.38	+11.18	10	+3
Convergence and Union (CiU)	3,595	23.88	+1.65	6	+1
People's Coalition (AP–PDP–UL)	1,901	12.63	New	3	+3
Unified Socialist Party of Catalonia (PSUC)	966	6.42	−13.00	1	−3
Republican Left of Catalonia (ERC)	768	5.10	−0.67	1	±0
Union of Independents (UdI)	621	4.13	New	0	±0
Progressives for Sant Cugat (PpSC)	314	2.09	New	0	±0
Left Nationalists (NE)	311	2.07	New	0	±0
Party of the Communists of Catalonia (PCC)	277	1.84	New	0	±0
Centrists of Catalonia (CC–UCD)	n/a	n/a	−12.96	0	−3
Independents for Sant Cugat (ISC)	n/a	n/a	−6.61	0	−1
Blank ballots	71	0.47	+0.26		
Total	15,054			21	±0
Valid votes	15,054	99.19	−0.48		
Invalid votes	123	0.81	+0.48		
Votes cast / turnout	15,177	66.41	+12.99		
Abstentions	7,676	33.59	−12.99		
Registered voters	22,853				

=== Santa Coloma de Gramanet ===
Population: 139,859

← Summary of the 8 May 1983 City Council of Santa Coloma de Gramanet election results →
Parties and alliances	Popular vote			Seats	
Parties and alliances	Votes	%	±pp	Total	+/−
Unified Socialist Party of Catalonia (PSUC)	27,443	45.83	+0.52	15	+2
Socialists' Party of Catalonia (PSC–PSOE)	23,106	38.59	+2.43	12	+1
Convergence and Union (CiU)	2,804	4.68	−1.97	0	−2
People's Coalition (AP–PDP–UL)	2,804	4.68	New	0	±0
Party of the Communists of Catalonia (PCC)	2,232	3.73	New	0	±0
Communist Movement of Catalonia (MCC)	617	1.03	−0.98	0	±0
Republican Left of Catalonia (ERC)	449	0.75	New	0	±0
Democratic and Social Centre (CDS)	317	0.53	New	0	±0
Centrists of Catalonia (CC–UCD)	n/a	n/a	−5.61	0	−1
Blank ballots	107	0.18	−0.03		
Total	59,879			27	n/a
Valid votes	59,879	97.96	−1.72		
Invalid votes	1,250	2.04	+1.72		
Votes cast / turnout	61,129	63.71	+1.82		
Abstentions	34,816	36.29	−1.82		
Registered voters	95,945				

=== Tarragona ===
Population: 112,238

← Summary of the 8 May 1983 City Council of Tarragona election results →
Parties and alliances	Popular vote			Seats	
Parties and alliances	Votes	%	±pp	Total	+/−
Socialists' Party of Catalonia (PSC–PSOE)	21,267	43.52	+17.64	14	+6
Convergence and Union (CiU)	9,090	18.60	+4.32	6	+2
People's Coalition (AP–PDP–UL)^{1}	8,458	17.31	+14.71	5	+5
Unified Socialist Party of Catalonia (PSUC)	3,467	7.09	−14.58	2	−4
Republican Left of Catalonia (ERC)	2,270	4.64	−0.43	0	−1
Party of the Communists of Catalonia (PCC)	1,660	3.40	New	0	±0
Candidacy for the Neighbours' Participation in the City Council (CPV)	1,648	3.37	−3.35	0	−2
Democratic and Social Centre (CDS)	799	1.63	New	0	±0
Centrists of Catalonia (CC–UCD)	n/a	n/a	−20.26	0	−6
Blank ballots	211	0.43	+0.12		
Total	48,870			27	±0
Valid votes	48,870	99.09	−0.29		
Invalid votes	448	0.91	+0.29		
Votes cast / turnout	49,318	63.73	+7.05		
Abstentions	28,065	36.27	−7.05		
Registered voters	77,383				
Sources
Footnotes: ^{1} People's Coalition results are compared to Democratic Coalition totals in the 1979 election.

=== Tarrasa ===
Population: 164,218

← Summary of the 8 May 1983 City Council of Tarrasa election results →
Parties and alliances	Popular vote			Seats	
Parties and alliances	Votes	%	±pp	Total	+/−
Socialists' Party of Catalonia (PSC–PSOE)	48,357	60.97	+30.30	18	+8
Convergence and Union (CiU)	14,195	17.90	+2.90	5	+1
People's Coalition (AP–PDP–UL)^{1}	6,519	8.22	+5.10	2	+2
Unified Socialist Party of Catalonia (PSUC)	6,357	8.02	−22.41	2	−7
Party of the Communists of Catalonia (PCC)	2,283	2.88	New	0	±0
Republican Left of Catalonia (ERC)	1,347	1.70	−0.86	0	±0
Centrists of Catalonia (CC–UCD)	n/a	n/a	−14.29	0	−4
Blank ballots	255	0.32	+0.05		
Total	79,313			27	±0
Valid votes	79,313	99.13	−0.56		
Invalid votes	696	0.87	+0.56		
Votes cast / turnout	80,009	68.69	+4.90		
Abstentions	36,474	31.31	−4.90		
Registered voters	116,483				
Sources
Footnotes: ^{1} People's Coalition results are compared to Democratic Coalition totals in the 1979 election.
