= 1983 Spanish local elections in La Rioja =

This article presents the results breakdown of the local elections held in La Rioja on 8 May 1983. The following tables show detailed results in the autonomous community's most populous municipalities, sorted alphabetically.

== City control ==
The following table lists party control in the most populous municipalities, including provincial capitals (highlighted in bold). Gains for a party are highlighted in that party's colour.

Municipality	Population	Previous control	New control
**Logroño**	109,536	Union of the Democratic Centre (UCD)	Spanish Socialist Workers' Party (PSOE)

== Municipalities ==
=== Logroño ===
Population: 109,536

← Summary of the 8 May 1983 City Council of Logroño election results →
Parties and alliances	Popular vote			Seats	
Parties and alliances	Votes	%	±pp	Total	+/−
Spanish Socialist Workers' Party (PSOE)	24,960	48.88	+14.96	**15**	+5
People's Coalition (AP–PDP–UL)^{1}	20,617	40.38	+29.31	**12**	+9
Progressive Riojan Party (PRP)	2,075	4.06	New	0	±0
Democratic and Social Centre (CDS)	1,543	3.02	New	0	±0
Communist Party of Spain (PCE)	1,317	2.58	−3.35	0	−1
Independents (INDEP)	547	1.07	New	0	±0
Union of the Democratic Centre (UCD)	n/a	n/a	−41.86	0	−12
Workers' Revolutionary Organization (ORT)	n/a	n/a	−5.25	0	−1
Blank ballots	0	0.00	±0.00		
**Total**	**51,059**			**27**	**±0**
Valid votes	51,059	100.00	+1.23		
Invalid votes	0	0.00	−1.23		
**Votes cast / turnout**	**51,059**	**62.88**	**+3.76**		
Abstentions	30,142	37.12	−3.76		
**Registered voters**	**81,201**				
Sources
Footnotes: ^{1} People's Coalition results are compared to Democratic Coalition totals in the 1979 election.

== See also ==
- 1983 Riojan regional election
