= 1979 Spanish local elections in La Rioja =

This article presents the results breakdown of the local elections held in La Rioja on 3 April 1979. The following tables show detailed results in the autonomous community's most populous municipalities, sorted alphabetically.

== City control ==
The following table lists party control in the most populous municipalities, including provincial capitals (highlighted in bold).

Municipality	Population	New control
**Logroño**	103,097	Union of the Democratic Centre (UCD)

== Municipalities ==
=== Logroño ===
Population: 103,097

Summary of the 3 April 1979 City Council of Logroño election results →
Parties and alliances	Popular vote			Seats	
Parties and alliances	Votes	%	±pp	Total	+/−
Union of the Democratic Centre (UCD)	18,364	41.86	n/a	**12**	n/a
Spanish Socialist Workers' Party (PSOE)	14,881	33.92	n/a	**10**	n/a
Democratic Coalition (CD)	4,856	11.07	n/a	**3**	n/a
Communist Party of Spain (PCE)	2,603	5.93	n/a	**1**	n/a
Workers' Revolutionary Organization (ORT)	2,304	5.25	n/a	**1**	n/a
Communist Movement of La Rioja (MCR)	866	1.97	n/a	0	n/a
Blank ballots	0	0.00	n/a		
**Total**	**43,874**			**27**	**n/a**
Valid votes	43,874	98.77	n/a		
Invalid votes	545	1.23	n/a		
**Votes cast / turnout**	**44,419**	**59.12**	**n/a**		
Abstentions	30,710	40.88	n/a		
**Registered voters**	**75,129**				
