= Communist Collective of Catalonia =

Communist Collective of Catalonia Col·lectiu Comunista de Catalunya
- Leaders: Joan Oms; Antoni Montserrat; Maria Olivares; Consol Casals
- Founded: 1977
- Dissolved: 1979
- Merged into: National Liberation Left Bloc; Nacionalistes d'Esquerra
- Headquarters: Barcelona
- Newspaper: K.0.
- Ideology: Communism; Catalan independence Països Catalans
- Political position: Radical left

The Communist Collective of Catalonia (Catalan: Col·lectiu Comunista de Catalunya, abbreviated CCC) was a political organization in Catalonia. It was formed in 1977 as a split from the Communist Organization of Spain (Bandera Roja) (OCE (BR)). Leaders of CCC included Joan Oms, Antoni Montserrat, Maria Olivares and Consol Casals. CCC published Quaderns de Debat.

== History ==
The group contested the 1979 municipal elections with the candidature Comunistes de Catalunya ('Communists of Catalonia'), winning 14,529 votes (0,55% of the votes in Catalonia) but no seats. Most of the votes came from Barcelona Province, where the group got 13,145 votes (0,64%). In the Barcelona City municipal election the candidature got 6,148 votes (0.77%). In Badalona the group got 1,557 votes (1.82%). In Girona Province the group only contested the Girona municipal election, where it got 1,384 votes (3.78%). With 0.09% of the Spanish vote, Comunistes de Catalunya was the most voted party which failed to win a single councillor seat.

CCC took part in the National Liberation Left Bloc (BEAN) and in the founding of Left Nationalists (NE) in 1979.
