= 1983 Spanish local elections =

- 8 May 1983 (Note: By-elections were held on 6 November 1983 in those constituencies where results were annulled by a final sentence following an electoral petition, or where elections were not held due to a lack of candidates.)

67,312 councillors in 7,781 municipal councils All 1,368 provincial/island seats in 44 provinces (Note: Including: 1,024 seats in 38 provincial deputations; 153 seats in 3 Basque foral deputations; 137 seats in 7 Canarian island cabildos; 54 seats in 3 Balearic island councils.)
- Opinion polls
- Registered: 27,474,920 ▲3.3%
- Turnout: 18,847,386 (68.6%) ▲6.0 pp
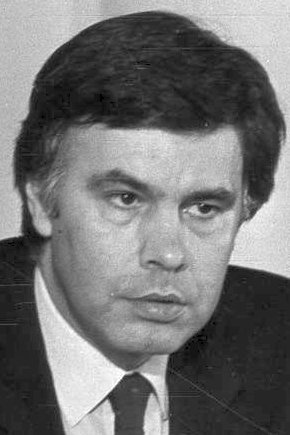

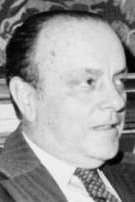

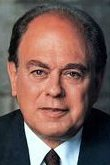

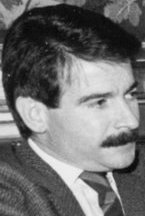

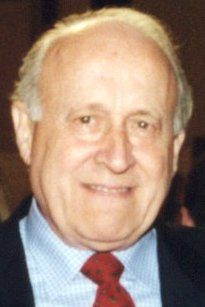

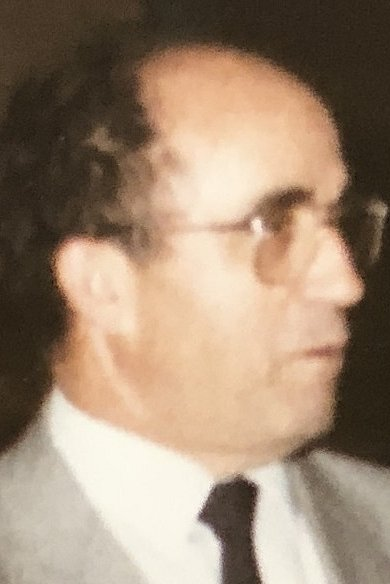
	First party	Second party	Third party
Leader	Felipe González	Manuel Fraga	Jordi Pujol
Party	PSOE	AP–PDP–UL	CiU
Leader since	13 October 1974	9 October 1976	19 September 1978
Last election	12,069 c., 28.2% 362 p.	2,383 c., 3.1% (Note: Results for CD in the 1979 elections.); 38 p.	1,782 c., 3.1% 45 p.
Seats won	23,729 c. 638 p.	21,076 c. 419 p.	3,329 c. 49 p.
Seat change	▲11,660 c. ▲276 p.	▲18,693 c. ▲381 p.	▲1,547 c. ▲4 p.
Popular vote	7,883,502	4,843,665	763,758
Percentage	41.9%	25.7%	4.1%
Swing	▲13.7 pp	▲22.6 pp	▲1.0 pp
	Fourth party	Fifth party	Sixth party
Leader	Gerardo Iglesias	Xabier Arzalluz	Hipólito Gómez de las Roces
Party	PCE	EAJ/PNV	PAR
Leader since	10 December 1982	18 January 1980	December 1977
Last election	3,725 c., 13.0% 71 p.	1,093 c., 2.2% 99 p.	276 c., 0.4% 4 p.
Seats won	2,495 c. 39 p.	1,322 c. 74 p.	1,120 c. 12 p.
Seat change	▼1,230 c. ▼32 p.	▲229 c. ▼25 p.	▲844 c. ▲8 p.
Popular vote	1,499,907	407,908	105,956
Percentage	8.0%	2.2%	0.6%
Swing	▼5.0 pp	0.0 pp	▲0.2 pp
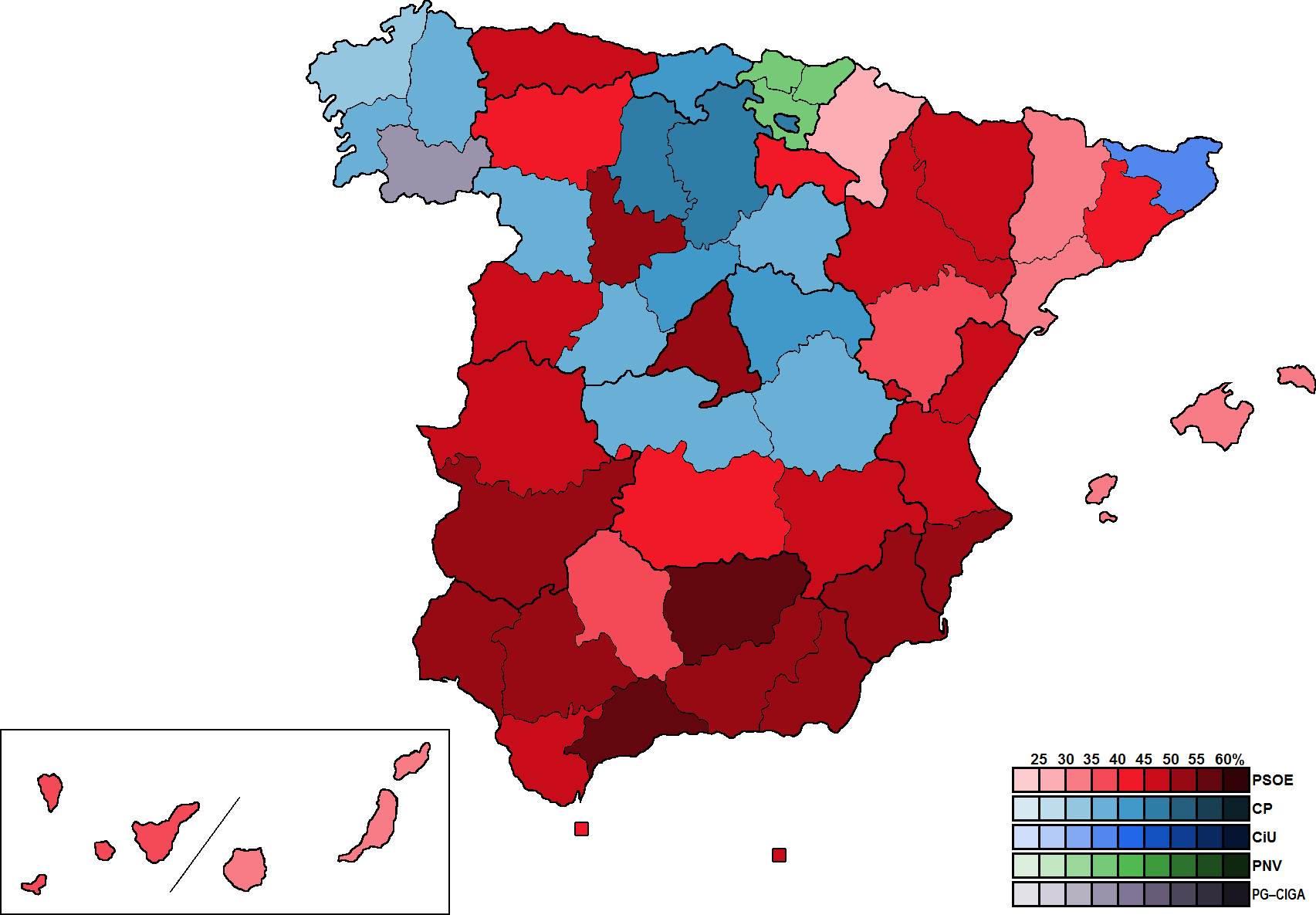
- Provincial results map for municipal elections

Local elections were held in Spain on 8 May 1983 to elect all 67,505 councillors in the 7,781 Spanish municipalities, all 1,177 provincial seats in 41 provinces (including 38 indirectly-elected provincial deputations and the three foral deputations in the Basque Country) and 191 seats in ten island councils (seven Canarian and three Balearic ones). They were held concurrently with regional elections in thirteen autonomous communities.

== Overview ==
=== Local government ===
Under the 1978 Constitution, the governance of municipalities in Spain was centered on the figure of city councils (Spanish: ayuntamientos), local corporations with independent legal personality composed of a mayor, a government council and an elected legislative assembly. The mayor was indirectly elected by the local assembly, requiring an absolute majority; otherwise, the candidate from the most-voted party automatically became mayor (ties were resolved by drawing lots). The concejo abierto system (English: open council), under which voters directly elected the local mayor by plurality voting, was reserved for municipalities under 25 inhabitants and some minor local entities.

Provincial deputations were the governing bodies of provinces in Spain—except for single-province autonomous communities (Note: Between December 1979 and February 1983, most Spanish regions were established as autonomous communities with their own statutes of autonomy. For Asturias (December 1981), Cantabria (December 1981), La Rioja (June 1982), Region of Murcia (June 1982), Navarre (August 1982) and Community of Madrid (February 1983), provincial deputations were abolished and their powers transferred to the newly-established autonomous communities.)—having an administration role of municipal activities and composed of a provincial president, an administrative body, and a plenary. For insular provinces, such as the Balearic and Canary Islands, deputations were replaced by island councils in each of the islands or group of islands. For Gran Canaria, Tenerife, Fuerteventura, La Gomera, El Hierro, Lanzarote and La Palma, this figure was referred to in Spanish as cabildo insular, whereas for Mallorca, Menorca and Ibiza–Formentera, its name was consejo insular (Catalan: consell insular). (Note: Amendments in 1983 determined that, for the Balearic Islands, regional lawmakers were to serve as island councillors.) The three Basque provinces had foral deputations instead (called General Assemblies, or Juntas Generales).

=== Date ===
The term of local assemblies in Spain expired four years after the date of their previous election. The election decree was required to be issued no later than the day after the expiration date of the assemblies, with election day taking place within from 55 to 70 days after the decree's publication in the Official State Gazette (BOE).

Elections to the assemblies of local entities were officially called on 10 March 1983 with the publication of the corresponding decree in the BOE, setting election day for 8 May. Subsequent by-elections were called on 29 August, for 6 November.

=== Electoral system ===
Voting for local assemblies and Canarian island councils was based on universal suffrage, comprising all Spanish nationals over 18 years of age, registered and residing in the municipality or council and with full civil and political rights.

Local and island councillors were elected using the D'Hondt method and closed-list proportional voting, with a five percent-threshold of valid votes (including blank ballots) in each constituency. Each municipality or council was a multi-member constituency, with a number of seats based on the following scale:

Population	Councillors		
Population	Municipalities	Canary Islands	Balearic Islands
<250	5	No island below 5,000 inhabitants	Fixed number: Ibiza–Formentera: 12; Menorca: 12; Mallorca: 30
251–1,000	7	No island below 5,000 inhabitants	Fixed number: Ibiza–Formentera: 12; Menorca: 12; Mallorca: 30
1,001–2,000	9	No island below 5,000 inhabitants	Fixed number: Ibiza–Formentera: 12; Menorca: 12; Mallorca: 30
2,001–5,000	11	No island below 5,000 inhabitants	Fixed number: Ibiza–Formentera: 12; Menorca: 12; Mallorca: 30
5,001–10,000	13	11	Fixed number: Ibiza–Formentera: 12; Menorca: 12; Mallorca: 30
10,001–20,000	17	13	Fixed number: Ibiza–Formentera: 12; Menorca: 12; Mallorca: 30
20,001–50,000	21	17	Fixed number: Ibiza–Formentera: 12; Menorca: 12; Mallorca: 30
50,001–100,000	25	21	Fixed number: Ibiza–Formentera: 12; Menorca: 12; Mallorca: 30
>100,001	+1 per each 100,000 inhabitants or fraction +1 if total is an even number		Fixed number: Ibiza–Formentera: 12; Menorca: 12; Mallorca: 30

Councillors in municipalities between 25 and 250 inhabitants were elected using open-list partial block voting, with voters choosing up to four candidates.

Most provincial deputations were indirectly elected by applying the D'Hondt method and a three percent-threshold of valid votes to municipal results—excluding candidacies not electing any councillor—in each judicial district. Seats were allocated to provincial deputations based on the following scale (with each judicial district being assigned an initial minimum of one seat and a maximum of three-fifths of the total number of provincial seats, with the remaining ones distributed in proportion to population):

Population	Seats
<500,000	25
500,001–1,000,000	27
>1,000,001	31
Madrid and Barcelona	51

The General Assemblies of Álava, Biscay and Gipuzkoa were directly elected by voters under their own, specific electoral regulations.

The law provided for by-elections to fill vacant seats only when results in a constituency were annulled by a final sentence following an electoral petition, or in cases where elections were not held due to a lack of candidates; otherwise, vacancies arising after the proclamation of candidates and during the legislative term were filled by the next candidates on the party lists or, when required, by designated substitutes.

== Parties and candidates ==
The electoral law allowed for parties and federations registered in the interior ministry, alliances and groupings of electors to present lists of candidates. Parties and federations intending to form an alliance were required to inform the relevant electoral commission within 10 days of the election call, whereas groupings of electors needed to secure the signature of a determined amount of the electors registered in the municipality for which they sought election, disallowing electors from signing for more than one list:

- At least two percent of the electors in municipalities with a population below 5,000 inhabitants, provided that the number of signers was more than double that of councillors at stake.
- At least 100 signatures in municipalities with a population between 5,001 and 10,000.
- At least 200 signatures in municipalities with a population between 10,001 and 50,000.
- At least 500 signatures in municipalities with a population between 50,001 and 150,000.
- At least 1,000 signatures in municipalities with a population between 150,001 and 300,000.
- At least 2,000 signatures in municipalities with a population between 300,001 and 1,000,000.
- At least 5,000 signatures in municipalities with a population over 1,000,001.

== Opinion polls ==
The table below list opinion polling results in reverse chronological order, showing the most recent first and using the dates when the survey fieldwork was done, as opposed to the date of publication. Where the fieldwork dates are unknown, the date of publication is given instead. The highest percentage figure in each polling survey is displayed with its background shaded in the leading party's colour. If a tie ensues, this is applied to the figures with the highest percentages. The "Lead" column on the right shows the percentage-point difference between the parties with the highest percentages in a poll. Refusals are generally excluded from the party vote percentages, while question wording and the treatment of "don't know" responses and those not intending to vote may vary between polling organisations.

Polling firm/Commissioner	Fieldwork date	Sample size	Turnout	UCD	PSOE	PCE	AP–PDP–PL	CiU	PNV	HB	ERC	EE	CDS	Ind.	Lead
1983 local elections	8 May 1983	—N/a	68.6	–	41.9	8.0	25.7	4.1	2.2	0.8	0.5	0.4	1.8	–	16.2
Metra Seis/Tiempo	11–15 Apr 1983	?	?	–	49.9	4.2	17.6	6.4					1.3	2.1	32.3
1979 local elections	3 Apr 1979	—N/a	62.6	30.9	28.2	13.0	3.1	3.1	2.2	1.0	0.6	0.4	–	–	2.7

== Results ==
=== Municipal ===
==== Overall ====
← Summary of the 8 May 1983 Spanish municipal election results →
Parties and alliances	Popular vote			Councillors	
Parties and alliances	Votes	%	±pp	Total	+/−
Spanish Socialist Workers' Party (PSOE)	7,883,502	41.87	+13.72	**23,729**	+11,660
People's Coalition (AP–PDP–UL)^{1}	4,843,665	25.73	+22.66	**21,076**	+18,693
Communist Party of Spain (PCE)	1,499,907	7.97	−5.08	**2,495**	−1,230
Convergence and Union (CiU)	763,758	4.06	+0.96	**3,329**	+1,547
Basque Nationalist Party (EAJ/PNV)	407,908	2.17	−0.03	**1,322**	+229
Democratic and Social Centre (CDS)	333,001	1.77	New	**658**	+658
Galicianist Party–Convergence of Independents of Galicia (PG–CIGA)^{2}	169,711	0.90	+0.48	**872**	+731
Popular Unity (HB)	158,163	0.84	−0.16	**385**	+118
Liberal Democratic Party (PDL)	145,982	0.78	New	**861**	+861
Socialist Party of Andalusia–Andalusian Party (PSA–PA)	110,780	0.59	−0.91	**146**	−113
Regionalist Aragonese Party (PAR)	105,956	0.56	+0.20	**1,120**	+844
Republican Left of Catalonia (ERC)	85,198	0.45	−0.18	**155**	−55
Basque Country Left (EE)	76,950	0.41	+0.05	**121**	+37
Party of the Communists of Catalonia (PCC)	67,214	0.36	New	**61**	+61
Tenerife Group of Independents (ATI)	66,140	0.35	New	**85**	+85
Galician Nationalist Bloc (BNG)^{3}	50,400	0.27	−0.21	**118**	−140
Canarian People's Union–Canarian Assembly (UPC–AC)	45,534	0.24	−0.10	**51**	+21
Majorcan Union (UM)	37,956	0.20	New	**140**	+140
Navarrese People's Union (UPN)	33,111	0.18	+0.11	**79**	+69
Valencian People's Union (UPV)^{4}	29,389	0.16	+0.09	**35**	+23
Workers' Socialist Party (PST)	27,168	0.14	New	0	±0
Independents of León (IL)	23,596	0.13	New	**11**	+11
Independent Provincial Group of Ciudad Real (APICR)	21,752	0.12	New	**77**	+77
United Extremadura (EU)	21,513	0.11	New	**202**	+202
Galician Left (EG)	19,173	0.10	New	**22**	+22
Valencian Independent Organization (OIV)	16,735	0.09	New	**63**	+63
United La Coruña (LCU)	16,007	0.09	New	**5**	+5
Communist Movement–Revolutionary Communist League (MC–LCR)^{5}	15,381	0.08	−0.56	**12**	−54
Regionalist Party of Cantabria (PRC)	13,644	0.07	−0.08	**63**	−18
Independent Galician Party (PGI)	12,763	0.07	New	**39**	+39
Cantonal Party (PCAN)	12,363	0.07	−0.02	**5**	−2
Socialist Party of Mallorca–Socialist Party of the Islands (PSM–PSI)	11,925	0.06	+0.01	**32**	+21
United Candidacy of Workers (CUT)	11,691	0.06	+0.03	**51**	+18
Governing Independent Viguese (VIGO)	10,556	0.06	New	**3**	+3
Agrarian Bloc–Spanish Ruralist Party (BAR–PRE)	10,298	0.05	+0.02	**210**	+102
Spanish Communist Workers' Party (PCOE)	10,098	0.05	±0.00	0	−1
Progressive Riojan Party (PRP)	9,788	0.05	New	**97**	+97
Independent Party of Almería (PIDA)	8,823	0.05	New	**62**	+62
Group of Independent Electors (ADEI)	5,254	0.03	New	**67**	+67
Majorera Assembly (AM)	5,215	0.03	±0.00	**29**	−2
Free Independents (IL)	3,701	0.02	New	**6**	+6
Gomera Group of Independents (AGI)	3,402	0.02	New	**26**	+26
Socialist Party of Menorca (PSM)	2,727	0.01	−0.01	**7**	−1
Independents of Fuerteventura (IF)	2,656	0.01	New	**17**	+17
Union of the Democratic Centre (UCD)	n/a	n/a	−30.87	0	−29,288
Others (lists at <0.05% not securing any provincial or island seat)	1,532,055	8.14	—	**9,368**	−5,904
Blank ballots	84,973	0.45	+0.33		
**Total**	**18,827,482**	**100.00**		**67,312**	**−193**
Valid votes	18,827,482	99.89	+1.13		
Invalid votes	19,904	0.11	−1.13		
**Votes cast / turnout**	**18,847,386**	**68.60**	**+5.98**		
Abstentions	8,627,534	31.40	−5.98		
**Registered voters**	**27,474,920**				
Sources
Footnotes: ^{1} People's Coalition results are compared to Democratic Coalition totals in the 1979 elections.; ^{2} Galicianist Party–Convergence of Independents of Galicia results are compared to Galician Unity totals in the 1979 elections.; ^{3} Galician Nationalist Bloc results are compared to Galician National-Popular Bloc totals in the 1979 elections.; ^{4} Valencian People's Union results are compared to Nationalist Party of the Valencian Country totals in the 1979 elections.; ^{5} Communist Movement–Revolutionary Communist League results are compared to the combined totals of Communist Movement–Organization of Communist Left and Revolutionary Communist League in the 1979 elections.

Popular vote
PSOE	41.87%
AP–PDP–UL	25.73%
PCE	7.97%
CiU	4.06%
EAJ/PNV	2.17%
CDS	1.77%
PG–CIGA	0.90%
HB	0.84%
PDL	0.78%
PSA–PA	0.59%
PAR	0.56%
Others	12.32%
Blank ballots	0.45%

==== City control ====
The following table lists party control in provincial capitals (highlighted in bold), as well as in municipalities above 75,000. Gains for a party are highlighted in that party's colour.

Municipality	Population	Previous control	New control
**Albacete**	116,484	Spanish Socialist Workers' Party (PSOE)	Spanish Socialist Workers' Party (PSOE)
Alcalá de Henares	137,169	Spanish Socialist Workers' Party (PSOE)	Spanish Socialist Workers' Party (PSOE)
Alcorcón	140,957	Spanish Socialist Workers' Party (PSOE)	Spanish Socialist Workers' Party (PSOE)
Algeciras	85,390	Communist Party of Spain (PCE)	Spanish Socialist Workers' Party (PSOE)
**Alicante**	245,963	Spanish Socialist Workers' Party (PSOE)	Spanish Socialist Workers' Party (PSOE)
**Almería**	140,745	Spanish Socialist Workers' Party (PSOE)	Spanish Socialist Workers' Party (PSOE)
**Ávila**	40,173	Union of the Democratic Centre (UCD)	People's Coalition (AP–PDP–UL)
Avilés	87,996	Spanish Socialist Workers' Party (PSOE)	Spanish Socialist Workers' Party (PSOE)
**Badajoz**	111,456	Union of the Democratic Centre (UCD)	Spanish Socialist Workers' Party (PSOE)
Badalona	231,175	Unified Socialist Party of Catalonia (PSUC)	Socialists' Party of Catalonia (PSC–PSOE)
Baracaldo	118,615	Basque Nationalist Party (EAJ/PNV)	Spanish Socialist Workers' Party (PSOE)
**Barcelona**	1,771,998	Socialists' Party of Catalonia (PSC–PSOE)	Socialists' Party of Catalonia (PSC–PSOE)
**Bilbao**	433,115	Basque Nationalist Party (EAJ/PNV)	Basque Nationalist Party (EAJ/PNV)
**Burgos**	152,545	Union of the Democratic Centre (UCD)	People's Coalition (AP–PDP–UL)
**Cáceres**	65,758	Union of the Democratic Centre (UCD)	Spanish Socialist Workers' Party (PSOE)
**Cádiz**	156,711	Spanish Socialist Workers' Party (PSOE)	Spanish Socialist Workers' Party (PSOE)
Cartagena	167,936	Union of the Democratic Centre (UCD)	Spanish Socialist Workers' Party (PSOE) (PCAN in 1987)
**Castellón de la Plana**	124,487	Spanish Socialist Workers' Party (PSOE)	Spanish Socialist Workers' Party (PSOE)
**Ciudad Real**	50,151	Union of the Democratic Centre (UCD)	People's Coalition (AP–PDP–UL) (AICR in 1987)
**Córdoba**	279,386	Communist Party of Spain (PCE)	Communist Party of Spain (PCE)
Cornellá	91,313	Unified Socialist Party of Catalonia (PSUC)	Unified Socialist Party of Catalonia (PSUC) (PSC–PSOE in 1985)
**Cuenca**	40,007	Union of the Democratic Centre (UCD)	People's Coalition (AP–PDP–UL) (PDP in 1987)
**Donostia-San Sebastián** (Note: Renamed from San Sebastián in December 1982.)	172,303	Basque Nationalist Party (EAJ/PNV)	Basque Nationalist Party (EAJ/PNV)
El Ferrol del Caudillo	87,691	Spanish Socialist Workers' Party (PSOE)	Spanish Socialist Workers' Party (PSOE)
Elche	164,779	Spanish Socialist Workers' Party (PSOE)	Spanish Socialist Workers' Party (PSOE)
Fuenlabrada	78,096	Spanish Socialist Workers' Party (PSOE)	Spanish Socialist Workers' Party (PSOE)
**Gerona**	65,586	Socialists' Party of Catalonia (PSC–PSOE)	Socialists' Party of Catalonia (PSC–PSOE)
Getafe	126,558	Spanish Socialist Workers' Party (PSOE)	Spanish Socialist Workers' Party (PSOE)
Gijón	256,433	Spanish Socialist Workers' Party (PSOE)	Spanish Socialist Workers' Party (PSOE)
**Granada**	246,642	Spanish Socialist Workers' Party (PSOE)	Spanish Socialist Workers' Party (PSOE)
**Guadalajara**	55,137	Spanish Socialist Workers' Party (PSOE)	Spanish Socialist Workers' Party (PSOE)
Hospitalet	291,066	Socialists' Party of Catalonia (PSC–PSOE)	Socialists' Party of Catalonia (PSC–PSOE)
**Huelva**	127,822	Spanish Socialist Workers' Party (PSOE)	Spanish Socialist Workers' Party (PSOE)
**Huesca**	41,455	Union of the Democratic Centre (UCD)	Spanish Socialist Workers' Party (PSOE)
**Jaén**	95,783	Spanish Socialist Workers' Party (PSOE)	Spanish Socialist Workers' Party (PSOE)
Jerez de la Frontera	175,653	Socialist Party of Andalusia–Andalusian Party (PSA–PA)	Socialist Party of Andalusia–Andalusian Party (PSA–PA)
**La Coruña**	231,721	Union of the Democratic Centre (UCD)	Spanish Socialist Workers' Party (PSOE)
La Laguna	106,146	Spanish Socialist Workers' Party (PSOE)	Spanish Socialist Workers' Party (PSOE)
**Las Palmas de Gran Canaria**	360,098	Union of the Democratic Centre (UCD)	Spanish Socialist Workers' Party (PSOE)
Leganés	163,910	Spanish Socialist Workers' Party (PSOE)	Spanish Socialist Workers' Party (PSOE)
**León**	127,095	Union of the Democratic Centre (UCD)	Independents of León (IL)
**Lérida**	109,397	Socialists' Party of Catalonia (PSC–PSOE)	Socialists' Party of Catalonia (PSC–PSOE)
**Logroño**	109,536	Union of the Democratic Centre (UCD)	Spanish Socialist Workers' Party (PSOE)
**Lugo**	72,574	Union of the Democratic Centre (UCD)	People's Coalition (AP–PDP–UL) (CPG in 1987)
**Madrid**	3,158,818	Spanish Socialist Workers' Party (PSOE)	Spanish Socialist Workers' Party (PSOE)
**Málaga**	502,232	Spanish Socialist Workers' Party (PSOE)	Spanish Socialist Workers' Party (PSOE)
Mataró	98,589	Socialists' Party of Catalonia (PSC–PSOE)	Socialists' Party of Catalonia (PSC–PSOE)
Móstoles	150,259	Spanish Socialist Workers' Party (PSOE)	Spanish Socialist Workers' Party (PSOE)
**Murcia**	284,585	Spanish Socialist Workers' Party (PSOE)	Spanish Socialist Workers' Party (PSOE)
**Orense**	94,346	Union of the Democratic Centre (UCD)	People's Coalition (AP–PDP–UL)
**Oviedo**	184,473	Union of the Democratic Centre (UCD)	Spanish Socialist Workers' Party (PSOE)
**Palencia**	71,716	Union of the Democratic Centre (UCD)	People's Coalition (AP–PDP–UL)
**Palma**	290,372	Spanish Socialist Workers' Party (PSOE)	Spanish Socialist Workers' Party (PSOE)
**Pamplona**	177,906	Spanish Socialist Workers' Party (PSOE)	Spanish Socialist Workers' Party (PSOE)
**Pontevedra**	64,184	Union of the Democratic Centre (UCD)	People's Coalition (AP–PDP–UL) (IG in 1987)
Reus	81,182	Socialists' Party of Catalonia (PSC–PSOE)	Socialists' Party of Catalonia (PSC–PSOE)
Sabadell	189,147	Unified Socialist Party of Catalonia (PSUC)	Unified Socialist Party of Catalonia (PSUC)
**Salamanca**	153,981	Spanish Socialist Workers' Party (PSOE)	Spanish Socialist Workers' Party (PSOE)
Sant Boi de Llobregat (Note: Reached 75,000 between 1981 and 1986.)	74,291	Socialists' Party of Catalonia (PSC–PSOE)	Socialists' Party of Catalonia (PSC–PSOE)
Santa Coloma de Gramanet	139,859	Unified Socialist Party of Catalonia (PSUC)	Unified Socialist Party of Catalonia (PSUC)
**Santa Cruz de Tenerife**	185,899	Union of the Democratic Centre (UCD)	Tenerife Group of Independents (ATI)
**Santander**	179,694	Union of the Democratic Centre (UCD)	People's Coalition (AP–PDP–UL)
Santiago de Compostela	82,404	Liberal Democratic Party (PDL)	Spanish Socialist Workers' Party (PSOE) (AP in 1986)
**Segovia**	50,759	Union of the Democratic Centre (UCD)	Spanish Socialist Workers' Party (PSOE) (PDP in 1986)
**Seville**	645,817	Socialist Party of Andalusia–Andalusian Party (PSA–PA)	Spanish Socialist Workers' Party (PSOE)
**Soria**	30,326	Union of the Democratic Centre (UCD)	People's Coalition (AP–PDP–UL) (PL in 1987)
**Tarragona**	112,238	Socialists' Party of Catalonia (PSC–PSOE)	Socialists' Party of Catalonia (PSC–PSOE)
Tarrasa	164,218	Socialists' Party of Catalonia (PSC–PSOE)	Socialists' Party of Catalonia (PSC–PSOE)
**Teruel**	25,935	Union of the Democratic Centre (UCD)	Free Independents (IL) (PAR in 1986)
**Toledo**	54,335	Union of the Democratic Centre (UCD)	Spanish Socialist Workers' Party (PSOE)
Torrejón de Ardoz	75,599	Spanish Socialist Workers' Party (PSOE)	Spanish Socialist Workers' Party (PSOE)
**Valencia**	744,748	Spanish Socialist Workers' Party (PSOE)	Spanish Socialist Workers' Party (PSOE)
**Valladolid**	320,293	Spanish Socialist Workers' Party (PSOE)	Spanish Socialist Workers' Party (PSOE)
Vigo	261,331	Spanish Socialist Workers' Party (PSOE)	Spanish Socialist Workers' Party (PSOE)
**Vitoria-Gasteiz** (Note: Renamed from Vitoria in May 1983.)	189,533	Basque Nationalist Party (EAJ/PNV)	Basque Nationalist Party (EAJ/PNV) (EA in 1986)
**Zamora**	58,560	Union of the Democratic Centre (UCD)	Spanish Socialist Workers' Party (PSOE)
**Zaragoza**	571,855	Spanish Socialist Workers' Party (PSOE)	Spanish Socialist Workers' Party (PSOE)

=== Provincial and island ===
==== Summary ====
← Summary of the 8 May 1983 Spanish provincial and island election results →
Parties and alliances	Seats				
Parties and alliances	PD	IC	FD	Total	+/−
Spanish Socialist Workers' Party (PSOE)	527	72	39	**638**	+276
People's Coalition (AP–PDP–UL)^{1}	350	55	14	**419**	+381
Basque Nationalist Party (EAJ/PNV)	—	—	74	**74**	−25
Convergence and Union (CiU)	49	—	—	**49**	+4
Communist Party of Spain (PCE)	35	4	0	**39**	−32
Galicianist Party–Convergence of Independents of Galicia (PG–CIGA)^{2}	21	—	—	**21**	+19
Popular Unity (HB)	—	—	20	**20**	−27
Democratic and Social Centre (CDS)	8	10	0	**18**	+18
Regionalist Aragonese Party (PAR)	12	—	—	**12**	+8
Majorera Assembly (AM)	—	9	—	**9**	±0
Basque Country Left (EE)	—	—	6	**6**	−8
Tenerife Group of Independents (ATI)	—	6	—	**6**	+6
Majorcan Union (UM)	—	6	—	**6**	+6
Liberal Democratic Party (PDL)	2	4	—	**6**	+6
Independent Herrenian Group (AHI)	—	6	—	**6**	±0
Gomera Group of Independents (AGI)	—	5	—	**5**	+5
Independents of Fuerteventura (IF)	—	5	—	**5**	+5
Socialist Party of Andalusia–Andalusian Party (PSA–PA)	4	—	—	**4**	+2
Canarian People's Union–Canarian Assembly (UPC–AC)^{3}	—	4	—	**4**	−6
Group of Independent Electors (ADEI)	3	—	—	**3**	+3
Socialist Party of Mallorca–Socialist Party of the Islands (PSM–PSI)	—	2	—	**2**	±0
Independents of León (IL)	2	—	—	**2**	+2
Independent Provincial Group of Ciudad Real (APICR)	2	—	—	**2**	+2
Socialist Party of Menorca (PSM)	—	2	—	**2**	±0
Galician Nationalist Bloc (BNG)^{4}	1	—	—	**1**	−2
United Extremadura (EU)	1	—	—	**1**	+1
United La Coruña (LCU)	1	—	—	**1**	+1
Agrarian Bloc–Spanish Ruralist Party (BAR–PRE)	1	—	—	**1**	±0
Free Independents (IL)	1	—	—	**1**	+1
Menorcan Independent Candidacy (CIM)	—	1	—	**1**	+1
Assembly (Tagoror)	—	0	—	0	−1
Union of the Democratic Centre (UCD)	n/a	n/a	n/a	0	−873
Navarrese People's Union (UPN)	n/a	n/a	n/a	0	−13
Electoral Groups of Merindad (Amaiur)	n/a	n/a	n/a	0	−7
Basque Nationalists (PNV–EE–ESEI)	n/a	n/a	n/a	0	−3
Party of Labour of Spain (PTE)	n/a	n/a	n/a	0	−1
Regionalist Party of Cantabria (PRC)	n/a	n/a	n/a	0	−1
Carlist Party (PC)	n/a	n/a	n/a	0	−1
Navarrese Left Union (UNAI)	n/a	n/a	n/a	0	−1
Navarrese Foral Independents (IFN)	n/a	n/a	n/a	0	−1
Independents (INDEP)	4	0	0	**4**	−12
**Total**	**1,024**	**191**	**153**	**1,368**	**−267**
Sources
Footnotes: ^{1} People's Coalition results are compared to Democratic Coalition totals in the 1979 election.; ^{2} Galicianist Party–Convergence of Independents of Galicia results are compared to Galician Unity totals in the 1979 election.; ^{3} Canarian People's Union–Canarian Assembly results are compared to the combined totals of Canarian People's Union and Neighbours' Assembly in the 1979 elections.; ^{4} Galician Nationalist Bloc results are compared to Galician National-Popular Bloc totals in the 1979 election.

==== Indirectly-elected ====
The following table lists party control in the indirectly-elected provincial deputations. Gains for a party are highlighted in that party's colour.

Province	Population	Previous control	New control
Albacete	339,373	Spanish Socialist Workers' Party (PSOE)	Spanish Socialist Workers' Party (PSOE)
Alicante	1,149,181	Union of the Democratic Centre (UCD)	Spanish Socialist Workers' Party (PSOE)
Almería	410,318	Union of the Democratic Centre (UCD)	Spanish Socialist Workers' Party (PSOE)
Ávila	181,483	Union of the Democratic Centre (UCD)	People's Coalition (AP–PDP–UL)
Badajoz	643,519	Union of the Democratic Centre (UCD)	Spanish Socialist Workers' Party (PSOE)
Barcelona	4,618,844	Socialists' Party of Catalonia (PSC–PSOE)	Socialists' Party of Catalonia (PSC–PSOE)
Burgos	355,738	Union of the Democratic Centre (UCD)	People's Coalition (AP–PDP–UL)
Cáceres	420,778	Union of the Democratic Centre (UCD)	Spanish Socialist Workers' Party (PSOE)
Cádiz	988,388	Spanish Socialist Workers' Party (PSOE)	Spanish Socialist Workers' Party (PSOE)
Castellón	431,214	Union of the Democratic Centre (UCD)	Spanish Socialist Workers' Party (PSOE)
Ciudad Real	475,129	Union of the Democratic Centre (UCD)	Spanish Socialist Workers' Party (PSOE)
Córdoba	720,823	Union of the Democratic Centre (UCD)	Spanish Socialist Workers' Party (PSOE)
Cuenca	215,547	Union of the Democratic Centre (UCD)	People's Coalition (AP–PDP–UL)
Gerona	462,776	Convergence and Union (CiU)	Convergence and Union (CiU)
Granada	759,830	Union of the Democratic Centre (UCD)	Independent (INDEP)
Guadalajara	142,979	Union of the Democratic Centre (UCD)	People's Coalition (AP–PDP–UL)
Huelva	418,601	Union of the Democratic Centre (UCD)	Spanish Socialist Workers' Party (PSOE)
Huesca	213,391	Union of the Democratic Centre (UCD)	Spanish Socialist Workers' Party (PSOE)
Jaén	639,821	Spanish Socialist Workers' Party (PSOE)	Spanish Socialist Workers' Party (PSOE)
La Coruña	1,093,121	Union of the Democratic Centre (UCD)	People's Coalition (AP–PDP–UL)
León	522,581	Union of the Democratic Centre (UCD)	Spanish Socialist Workers' Party (PSOE)
Lérida	348,058	Union of the Democratic Centre (UCD)	Socialists' Party of Catalonia (PSC–PSOE)
~~Logroño~~	253,969	Union of the Democratic Centre (UCD)	1983 Riojan regional election →
Lugo	405,365	Union of the Democratic Centre (UCD)	People's Coalition (AP–PDP–UL)
Málaga	1,025,609	Spanish Socialist Workers' Party (PSOE)	Spanish Socialist Workers' Party (PSOE)
~~Madrid~~	4,686,646	Spanish Socialist Workers' Party (PSOE)	1983 Madrilenian regional election →
~~Murcia~~	955,487	Spanish Socialist Workers' Party (PSOE)	1983 Murcian regional election →
Orense	430,159	Union of the Democratic Centre (UCD)	People's Coalition (AP–PDP–UL)
~~Oviedo~~	1,129,556	Union of the Democratic Centre (UCD)	1983 Asturian regional election →
Palencia	187,851	Union of the Democratic Centre (UCD)	People's Coalition (AP–PDP–UL)
Pontevedra	883,267	Union of the Democratic Centre (UCD)	People's Coalition (AP–PDP–UL)
Salamanca	363,386	Union of the Democratic Centre (UCD)	Spanish Socialist Workers' Party (PSOE)
~~Santander~~	513,115	Union of the Democratic Centre (UCD)	1983 Cantabrian regional election →
Segovia	149,398	Union of the Democratic Centre (UCD)	People's Coalition (AP–PDP–UL)
Seville	1,478,311	Spanish Socialist Workers' Party (PSOE)	Spanish Socialist Workers' Party (PSOE)
Soria	99,237	Union of the Democratic Centre (UCD)	Group of Independent Electors (ADEI) (AP in 1985)
Tarragona	512,679	Convergence and Union (CiU)	Convergence and Union (CiU)
Teruel	150,474	Union of the Democratic Centre (UCD)	Spanish Socialist Workers' Party (PSOE)
Toledo	474,613	Union of the Democratic Centre (UCD)	People's Coalition (AP–PDP–UL)
Valencia	2,065,705	Spanish Socialist Workers' Party (PSOE)	Spanish Socialist Workers' Party (PSOE)
Valladolid	481,165	Union of the Democratic Centre (UCD)	Spanish Socialist Workers' Party (PSOE)
Zamora	227,393	Union of the Democratic Centre (UCD)	People's Coalition (AP–PDP–UL)
Zaragoza	828,496	Union of the Democratic Centre (UCD)	Spanish Socialist Workers' Party (PSOE)

==== Island councils ====
The following table lists party control in the island councils. Gains for a party are highlighted in that party's colour.

Island	Population	Previous control	New control
El Hierro	6,507	Independent Herrenian Group (AHI)	Independent Herrenian Group (AHI)
Fuerteventura	27,104	Majorera Assembly (AM)	Majorera Assembly (AM)
Gran Canaria	630,937	Union of the Democratic Centre (UCD)	Spanish Socialist Workers' Party (PSOE)
Ibiza–Formentera	?	People's Coalition (AP–PDP–UL)	People's Coalition (AP–PDP–UL)
La Gomera	18,760	Gomera Group of Independents (AGI)	Gomera Group of Independents (AGI)
La Palma	76,426	People's Coalition (AP–PDP–UL)	People's Coalition (AP–PDP–UL)
Lanzarote	50,721	Union of the Democratic Centre (UCD)	Spanish Socialist Workers' Party (PSOE)
Mallorca	?	Union of the Democratic Centre (UCD)	Majorcan Union (UM)
Menorca	?	Union of the Democratic Centre (UCD)	Spanish Socialist Workers' Party (PSOE)
Tenerife	557,191	Tenerife Group of Independents (ATI)	Spanish Socialist Workers' Party (PSOE)

==== Foral deputations ====
The following table lists party control in the foral deputations. Gains for a party are highlighted in that party's colour.

Province	Population	Previous control	New control
Álava	257,612	Basque Nationalist Party (EAJ/PNV)	Basque Nationalist Party (EAJ/PNV)
Biscay	1,227,299	Basque Nationalist Party (EAJ/PNV)	Basque Nationalist Party (EAJ/PNV)
Guipúzcoa	694,404	Basque Nationalist Party (EAJ/PNV)	Basque Nationalist Party (EAJ/PNV) (EA in 1986)
~~Navarre~~	501,279	Union of the Democratic Centre (UCD)	1983 Navarrese regional election →

== Bibliography ==
- Ley 41/1975, de 19 de noviembre, de Bases del Estatuto de Régimen Local (Law 41/1975). Official State Gazette (in Spanish). 19 November 1975. BOE-A-1975-23920.
- Real Decreto-ley 18/1977, de 4 de marzo, para la restauración de las Juntas Generales de Guipúzcoa y Vizcaya (Royal Decree 18/1977). Official State Gazette (in Spanish). 4 March 1977. BOE-A-1977-6963.
- Ley 39/1978, de 17 de julio, de elecciones locales (Law 39/1978). Official State Gazette (in Spanish). 17 July 1978. BOE-A-1978-18636.
- Constitución Española (Constitution). Official State Gazette (in Spanish). 27 December 1978 [version as of 29 December 1978]. BOE-A-1978-31229.
- Ley Orgánica 7/1981, de 30 de diciembre, de Estatuto de Autonomía para Asturias (Organic Law 7/1981). Official State Gazette (in Spanish). 30 December 1981 [version as of 11 January 1982]. BOE-A-1982-634.
- Ley Orgánica 8/1981, de 30 de diciembre, de Estatuto de Autonomía para Cantabria (Organic Law 7/1981). Official State Gazette (in Spanish). 30 December 1981 [version as of 11 January 1982]. BOE-A-1982-635.
- Ley Orgánica 3/1982, de 9 de junio, de Estatuto de Autonomía de La Rioja (Organic Law 3/1982). Official State Gazette (in Spanish). 9 June 1982 [version as of 19 June 1982]. BOE-A-1982-15030.
- Ley Orgánica 4/1982, de 9 de junio, de Estatuto de Autonomía para la Región de Murcia (Organic Law 4/1982). Official State Gazette (in Spanish). 9 June 1982 [version as of 19 June 1982]. BOE-A-1982-15031.
- Ley Orgánica 10/1982, de 10 de agosto, de Estatuto de Autonomía de Canarias (Organic Law 10/1982). Official State Gazette (in Spanish). 10 August 1982 [version as of 16 August 1982]. BOE-A-1982-20821.
- Ley Orgánica 13/1982, de 10 de agosto, de reintegración y amejoramiento del Régimen Foral de Navarra (Organic Law 13/1982). Official State Gazette (in Spanish). 10 August 1982 [version as of 16 August 1982]. BOE-A-1982-20824.
- Ley Orgánica 3/1983, de 25 de febrero, de Estatuto de Autonomía de la Comunidad de Madrid (Organic Law 3/1983). Official State Gazette (in Spanish). 25 February 1983 [version as of 1 March 1983]. BOE-A-1983-6317.
- Ley Orgánica 2/1983, de 25 de febrero, de Estatuto de Autonomía para las islas Baleares (Organic Law 2/1983). Official State Gazette (in Spanish). 1 March 1983. BOE-A-1983-6316.
- Ley Orgánica 6/1983, de 2 de marzo, por la que se modifican determinados artículos de la Ley 39/1978, de 17 de julio, de Elecciones Locales (Organic Law 6/1983). Official State Gazette (in Spanish). 2 March 1983. BOE-A-1983-6573.
- Ley 2/1983, de 7 de marzo, sobre Ley Electoral para las Juntas Generales del Territorio Histórico de Guipúzcoa (Law 2/1983). Official State Gazette (in Spanish). 7 March 1983. BOE-A-2012-4811.
- Ley 3/1983, de 7 de marzo, sobre Ley Electoral para las Juntas Generales del Territorio Histórico de Bizkaia (Law 3/1983). Official State Gazette (in Spanish). 7 March 1983. BOE-A-2012-4812.
- Ley 4/1983, de 7 de marzo, sobre Elecciones a Juntas Generales de Álava (Law 4/1983). Official State Gazette (in Spanish). 7 March 1983. BOE-A-2012-4813.
- Real Decreto 448/1983, de 9 de marzo, de convocatoria de Elecciones Locales (Royal Decree 448/1983). Official State Gazette (in Spanish). 9 March 1983. BOE-A-1983-7296.
- Real Decreto 2301/1983, de 25 de agosto, por el que se convocan Elecciones Locales parciales (Royal Decree 2301/1983). Official State Gazette (in Spanish). 29 August 1983. BOE-A-1983-23129.
