= 1979 Spanish local elections =

- 3 April 1979 (Note: By-elections were held on 26 June and 2 October 1979 in those constituencies where results were annulled by a final sentence following an electoral petition, or where elections were not held due to a lack of candidates.)

67,505 councillors in 7,870 municipal councils All 1,635 provincial/island seats in 50 provinces (Note: Including: 1,152 seats in 43 provincial deputations; 298 seats in 4 Basque and Navarrese foral deputations; 137 seats in 7 Canarian island cabildos; 48 seats in 3 Balearic island councils.)
- Registered: 26,591,013
- Turnout: 16,650,095 (62.6%)
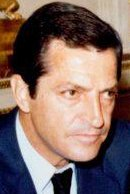

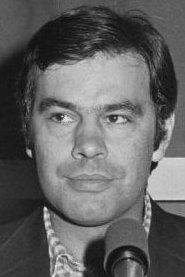

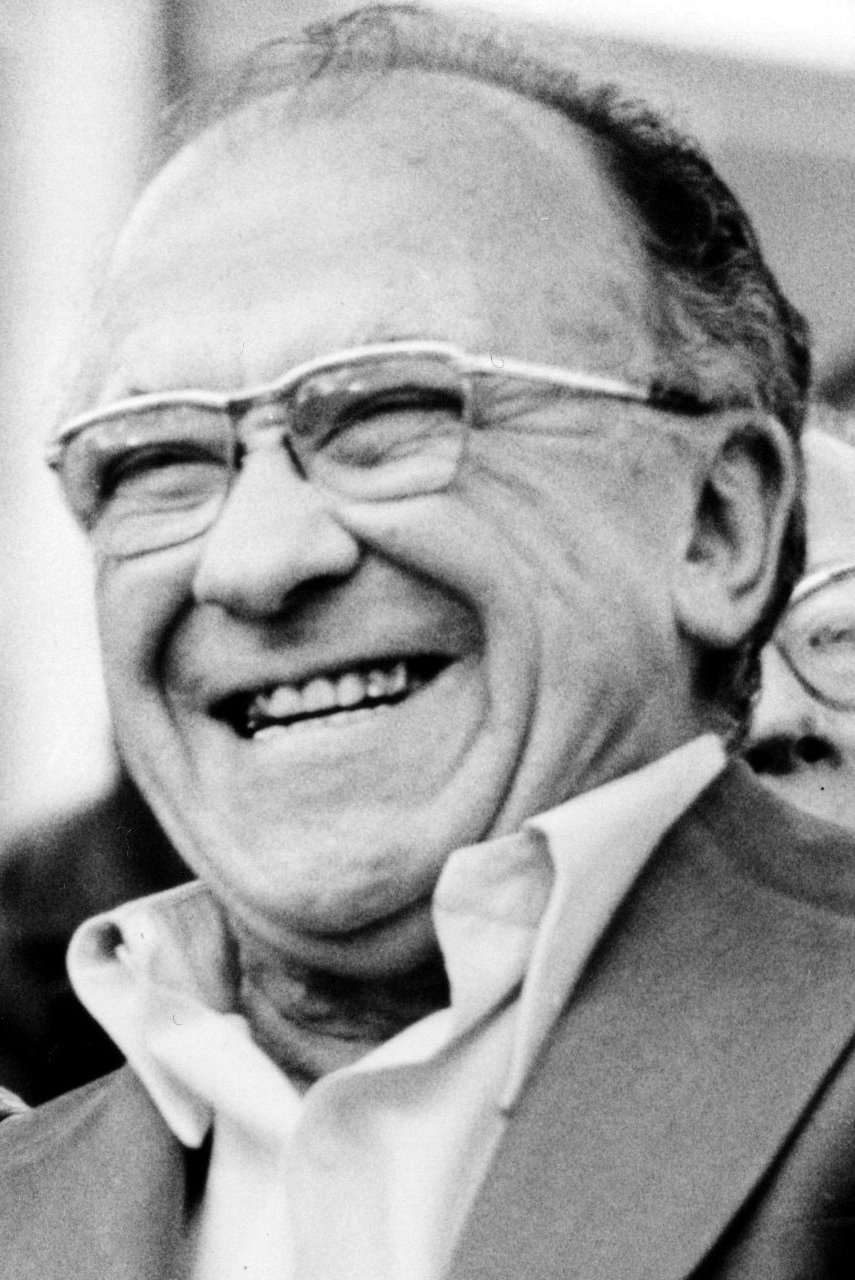

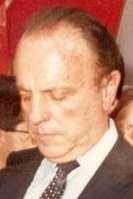

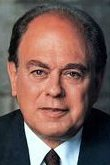

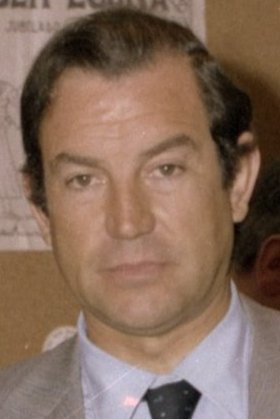
	First party	Second party	Third party
Leader	Adolfo Suárez	Felipe González	Santiago Carrillo
Party	UCD	PSOE	PCE
Leader since	3 May 1977	13 October 1974	3 July 1960
Seats won	29,288 c. 873 p.	12,069 c. 362 p.	3,725 c. 71 p.
Popular vote	5,067,634	4,621,672	2,142,049
Percentage	30.9%	28.2%	13.0%
	Fourth party	Fifth party	Sixth party
Leader	Manuel Fraga	Jordi Pujol	Carlos Garaikoetxea
Party	CD	CiU	EAJ/PNV
Leader since	9 October 1976	19 September 1978	1977
Seats won	2,383 c. 38 p.	1,782 c. 45 p.	1,093 c. 99 p.
Popular vote	504,780	509,128	361,160
Percentage	3.1%	3.1%	2.2%
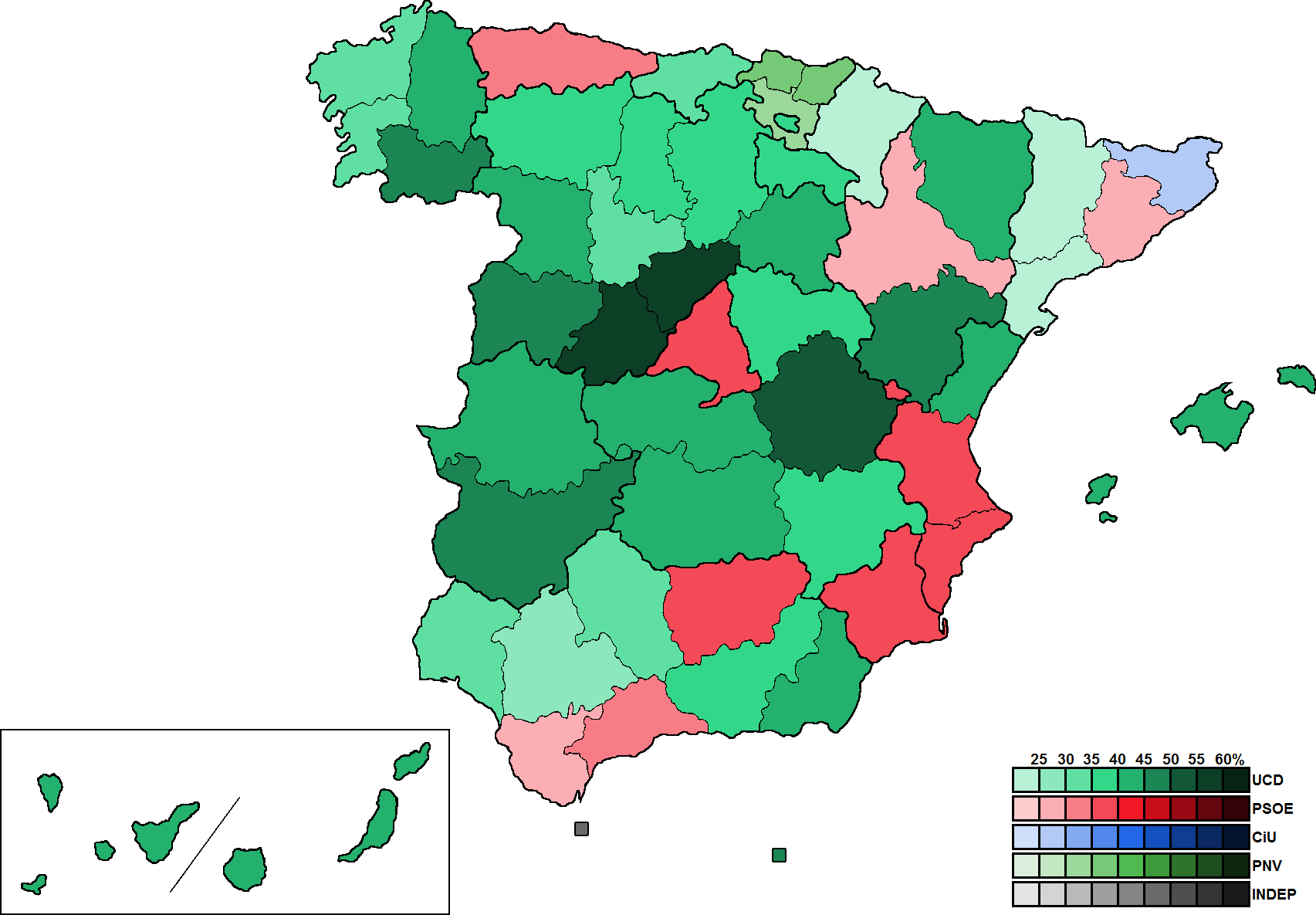
- Provincial results map for municipal elections

Local elections were held in Spain on 3 April 1979 to elect all 67,505 councillors in the 7,870 Spanish municipalities, all 1,450 provincial seats in 47 provinces (including 43 indirectly-elected provincial deputations and the four foral deputations in the Basque Country and Navarre) and 185 seats in ten island councils (seven Canarian and three Balearic ones).

While the national ruling Union of the Democratic Centre (UCD) emerged as the largest party overall, an alliance between the Spanish Socialist Workers' Party (PSOE) and the Communist Party of Spain (PCE) saw municipal control over the main urban areas switching to left-wing parties.

== Overview ==
=== Local government ===
Under the 1978 Constitution, the governance of municipalities in Spain was centered on the figure of city councils (Spanish: ayuntamientos), local corporations with independent legal personality composed of a mayor, a government council and an elected legislative assembly. The mayor was indirectly elected by the local assembly, requiring an absolute majority; otherwise, the candidate from the most-voted party automatically became mayor (ties were resolved by drawing lots). The concejo abierto system (English: open council), under which voters directly elected the local mayor by plurality voting, was reserved for municipalities under 25 inhabitants and some minor local entities.

Provincial deputations were the governing bodies of provinces in Spain, having an administration role of municipal activities and composed of a provincial president, an administrative body, and a plenary. For insular provinces, such as the Balearic and Canary Islands, deputations were replaced by island councils in each of the islands or group of islands. For Gran Canaria, Tenerife, Fuerteventura, La Gomera, El Hierro, Lanzarote and La Palma, this figure was referred to in Spanish as cabildo insular, whereas for Mallorca, Menorca and Ibiza–Formentera, its name was consejo insular (Catalan: consell insular). The three Basque provinces and Navarre had foral deputations instead (called General Assemblies—or Juntas Generales—in the Basque Country).

=== Date ===
The term of local assemblies in Spain expired four years after the date of their previous election. The election decree was required to be issued no later than the day after the expiration date of the assemblies, with election day taking place 65 days after the decree's publication in the Official State Gazette (BOE).

Elections to the assemblies of local entities were officially called on 27 January 1979 with the publication of the corresponding decree in the BOE, setting election day for 3 April. Subsequent by-elections were called on 21 April (for 26 June) and 28 July (for 2 October).

=== Electoral system ===
Voting for local assemblies and island councils was based on universal suffrage, comprising all Spanish nationals over 18 years of age, registered and residing in the municipality or council and with full civil and political rights.

Local and island councillors were elected using the D'Hondt method and closed-list proportional voting, with a five percent-threshold of valid votes (including blank ballots) in each constituency. Each municipality or council was a multi-member constituency, with a number of seats based on the following scale:

Population	Councillors		
Population	Municipalities	Canary Islands	Balearic Islands
<250	5	No island below 5,000 inhabitants	Fixed number: Ibiza–Formentera: 12; Menorca: 12; Mallorca: 24
251–1,000	7	No island below 5,000 inhabitants	Fixed number: Ibiza–Formentera: 12; Menorca: 12; Mallorca: 24
1,001–2,000	9	No island below 5,000 inhabitants	Fixed number: Ibiza–Formentera: 12; Menorca: 12; Mallorca: 24
2,001–5,000	11	No island below 5,000 inhabitants	Fixed number: Ibiza–Formentera: 12; Menorca: 12; Mallorca: 24
5,001–10,000	13	11	Fixed number: Ibiza–Formentera: 12; Menorca: 12; Mallorca: 24
10,001–20,000	17	13	Fixed number: Ibiza–Formentera: 12; Menorca: 12; Mallorca: 24
20,001–50,000	21	17	Fixed number: Ibiza–Formentera: 12; Menorca: 12; Mallorca: 24
50,001–100,000	25	21	Fixed number: Ibiza–Formentera: 12; Menorca: 12; Mallorca: 24
>100,001	+1 per each 100,000 inhabitants or fraction +1 if total is an even number		Fixed number: Ibiza–Formentera: 12; Menorca: 12; Mallorca: 24

Most provincial deputations were indirectly elected by applying the D'Hondt method and a three percent-threshold of valid votes to municipal results—excluding candidacies not electing any councillor—in each judicial district. Seats were allocated to provincial deputations based on the following scale (with each judicial district being assigned an initial minimum of one seat and a maximum of one-third of the total number of provincial seats, with the remaining ones distributed in proportion to population):

Population	Seats
<500,000	24
500,001–1,000,000	27
>1,000,001	30
Madrid and Barcelona	51

The foral deputation of Navarre and the General Assemblies of Álava, Biscay and Gipuzkoa were directly elected by voters under their own, specific electoral regulations.

The law provided for by-elections to fill vacant seats only when results in a constituency were annulled by a final sentence following an electoral petition, or in cases where elections were not held due to a lack of candidates; otherwise, vacancies arising after the proclamation of candidates and during the legislative term were filled by the next candidates on the party lists or, when required, by designated substitutes.

== Parties and candidates ==
The electoral law allowed for parties and federations registered in the interior ministry, alliances and groupings of electors to present lists of candidates. Parties and federations intending to form an alliance were required to inform the relevant electoral commission within 10 days of the election call, whereas groupings of electors needed to secure the signature of a determined amount of the electors registered in the municipality for which they sought election, disallowing electors from signing for more than one list:

- At least two percent of the electors in municipalities with a population below 5,000 inhabitants, provided that the number of signers was more than double that of councillors at stake.
- At least 100 signatures in municipalities with a population between 5,001 and 10,000.
- At least 200 signatures in municipalities with a population between 10,001 and 50,000.
- At least 500 signatures in municipalities with a population between 50,001 and 150,000.
- At least 1,000 signatures in municipalities with a population between 150,001 and 300,000.
- At least 2,000 signatures in municipalities with a population between 300,001 and 1,000,000.
- At least 5,000 signatures in municipalities with a population over 1,000,001.

== Results ==
=== Municipal ===
==== Overall ====
Summary of the 3 April 1979 Spanish municipal election results →
Parties and alliances	Popular vote			Councillors	
Parties and alliances	Votes	%	±pp	Total	+/−
Union of the Democratic Centre (UCD)	5,067,634	30.87	n/a	**29,288**	n/a
Spanish Socialist Workers' Party (PSOE)	4,621,672	28.15	n/a	**12,069**	n/a
Communist Party of Spain (PCE)	2,142,049	13.05	n/a	**3,725**	n/a
Convergence and Union (CiU)	509,128	3.10	n/a	**1,782**	n/a
Democratic Coalition (CD)	504,780	3.07	n/a	**2,383**	n/a
Basque Nationalist Party (EAJ/PNV)	361,160	2.20	n/a	**1,093**	n/a
Socialist Party of Andalusia–Andalusian Party (PSA–PA)	245,507	1.50	n/a	**259**	n/a
Popular Unity (HB)	164,516	1.00	n/a	**267**	n/a
Party of Labour of Spain (PTE)	148,083	0.90	n/a	**229**	n/a
Workers' Revolutionary Organization (ORT)	114,539	0.70	n/a	**107**	n/a
Republican Left of Catalonia–National Front of Catalonia (ERC–FNC)	103,547	0.63	n/a	**210**	n/a
Communist Movement–Organization of Communist Left (MC–OIC)	86,792	0.53	n/a	**59**	n/a
Galician National-Popular Bloc (BNPG)	78,216	0.48	n/a	**258**	n/a
Galician Unity (PG–POG–PSG)	69,060	0.42	n/a	**141**	n/a
National Union (UN)	61,889	0.38	n/a	**122**	n/a
Basque Country Left (EE)	59,332	0.36	n/a	**84**	n/a
Regionalist Aragonese Party (PAR)	58,661	0.36	n/a	**276**	n/a
Canarian People's Union (UPC)	55,779	0.34	n/a	**30**	n/a
Spanish Socialist Workers' Party (historical) (PSOEh)	26,585	0.16	n/a	**45**	n/a
Regionalist Party of Cantabria (PRC)	23,870	0.15	n/a	**81**	n/a
Revolutionary Communist League (LCR)	18,390	0.11	n/a	**7**	n/a
Valencian Regional Union (URV)	18,015	0.11	n/a	**2**	n/a
Cantonal Party (PCAN)	14,753	0.09	n/a	**7**	n/a
Communists of Catalonia (ComC)	14,529	0.09	n/a	0	n/a
Independent Councillors for La Rioja (CIR)	13,580	0.08	n/a	**147**	n/a
Navarrese People's Union (UPN)	12,305	0.07	n/a	**10**	n/a
Socialist Party of National Liberation (PSAN)	10,907	0.07	n/a	**5**	n/a
Nationalist Party of the Valencian Country (PNPV)	10,773	0.07	n/a	**12**	n/a
Communist Unification of Spain (UCE)	9,908	0.06	n/a	**4**	n/a
Candidates for Democracy (CPLD)	9,778	0.06	n/a	**77**	n/a
Carlist Party (PC)	9,548	0.06	n/a	**9**	n/a
Electoral Group of Ceuta for a Democratic City Council (AECAD)	8,855	0.05	n/a	**12**	n/a
Free Electoral Group of Tenerife (AL)	8,815	0.05	n/a	**4**	n/a
Socialist Party of Mallorca (PSM)	8,123	0.05	n/a	**11**	n/a
Republican Left (IR)	7,661	0.05	n/a	**5**	n/a
Leonese Peasants Electoral Group (AECL)	7,496	0.05	n/a	**112**	n/a
Spanish Communist Workers' Party (PCOE)	7,400	0.05	n/a	**1**	n/a
Neighbours' Assembly (AV)	6,994	0.04	n/a	**2**	n/a
Navarrese Left Union (UNAI)	6,604	0.04	n/a	**31**	n/a
Spanish Ruralist Party (PRE)	5,023	0.03	n/a	**78**	n/a
Majorera Assembly (AM)	4,789	0.03	n/a	**31**	n/a
Socialist Party of Menorca (PSM)	4,045	0.02	n/a	**8**	n/a
Others (lists at <0.05% not securing any provincial or island seat)	1,674,567	10.20	n/a	**14,422**	n/a
Blank ballots	20,038	0.12	n/a		
**Total**	**16,415,695**	**100.00**		**67,505**	**n/a**
Valid votes	16,415,695	98.76	n/a		
Invalid votes	234,400	1.24	n/a		
**Votes cast / turnout**	**16,650,095**	**62.62**	**n/a**		
Abstentions	9,940,918	37.38	n/a		
**Registered voters**	**26,591,013**				
Sources (Note: Data from the Historia Electoral.com website is used due to the disorganized nature of Ministry of the Interior's data for 1979. The former is based on the latter but consolidating the various entries pertaining to the same party, while replacing the results for Catalonia and the Basque Country with those found on the websites of the Government of Catalonia and the Basque Parliament, which are more complete.)

Popular vote
UCD	30.87%
PSOE	28.15%
PCE	13.05%
CiU	3.10%
CD	3.07%
EAJ/PNV	2.20%
PSA–PA	1.50%
HB	1.00%
PTE	0.90%
ORT	0.70%
ERC–FNC	0.63%
MC–OIC	0.53%
Others	14.17%
Blank ballots	0.12%

==== City control ====
The following table lists party control in provincial capitals (highlighted in bold), as well as in municipalities above 75,000.

Municipality	Population	New control
**Albacete**	105,408	Spanish Socialist Workers' Party (PSOE)
Alcalá de Henares	110,102	Spanish Socialist Workers' Party (PSOE)
Alcorcón	119,300	Spanish Socialist Workers' Party (PSOE)
Algeciras	92,273	Communist Party of Spain (PCE)
**Alicante**	232,019	Spanish Socialist Workers' Party (PSOE)
**Almería**	133,844	Spanish Socialist Workers' Party (PSOE)
**Ávila**	37,302	Union of the Democratic Centre (UCD)
Avilés	89,285	Spanish Socialist Workers' Party (PSOE)
**Badajoz**	110,290	Union of the Democratic Centre (UCD)
Badalona	229,780	Unified Socialist Party of Catalonia (PSUC)
Baracaldo	122,540	Basque Nationalist Party (EAJ/PNV)
**Barcelona**	1,754,579	Socialists' Party of Catalonia (PSC–PSOE)
**Bilbao**	450,661	Basque Nationalist Party (EAJ/PNV)
**Burgos**	145,473	Union of the Democratic Centre (UCD)
**Cáceres**	63,181	Union of the Democratic Centre (UCD)
**Cádiz**	153,327	Spanish Socialist Workers' Party (PSOE)
Cartagena	162,630	Union of the Democratic Centre (UCD)
**Castellón de la Plana**	115,522	Spanish Socialist Workers' Party (PSOE)
**Ciudad Real**	48,075	Union of the Democratic Centre (UCD)
**Córdoba**	269,998	Communist Party of Spain (PCE)
Cornellá	91,563	Unified Socialist Party of Catalonia (PSUC)
**Cuenca**	38,601	Union of the Democratic Centre (UCD)
El Ferrol del Caudillo	88,161	Spanish Socialist Workers' Party (PSOE)
Elche	160,071	Spanish Socialist Workers' Party (PSOE)
**Gerona**	83,929	Socialists' Party of Catalonia (PSC–PSOE)
Getafe	124,601	Spanish Socialist Workers' Party (PSOE)
Gijón	253,294	Spanish Socialist Workers' Party (PSOE)
**Granada**	225,034	Spanish Socialist Workers' Party (PSOE)
**Guadalajara**	47,758	Spanish Socialist Workers' Party (PSOE)
Hospitalet	289,747	Socialists' Party of Catalonia (PSC–PSOE)
**Huelva**	122,494	Spanish Socialist Workers' Party (PSOE)
**Huesca**	38,095	Union of the Democratic Centre (UCD)
**Jaén**	88,968	Spanish Socialist Workers' Party (PSOE)
Jerez de la Frontera	180,098	Socialist Party of Andalusia–Andalusian Party (PSA–PA)
**La Coruña**	224,289	Galician Unity (PG–POG–PSG) (UCD in 1981)
La Laguna	112,472	Spanish Socialist Workers' Party (PSOE)
**Las Palmas de Gran Canaria**	345,925	Canarian People's Union (UPC) (PSOE in 1980; UCD in 1982)
Leganés	151,235	Spanish Socialist Workers' Party (PSOE)
**León**	120,761	Spanish Socialist Workers' Party (PSOE) (UCD in 1979)
**Lérida**	106,190	Socialists' Party of Catalonia (PSC–PSOE)
**Logroño**	103,097	Union of the Democratic Centre (UCD)
**Lugo**	71,574	Union of the Democratic Centre (UCD)
**Madrid**	3,355,720	Spanish Socialist Workers' Party (PSOE)
**Málaga**	454,882	Spanish Socialist Workers' Party (PSOE)
Mataró	96,942	Socialists' Party of Catalonia (PSC–PSOE)
Móstoles	101,266	Spanish Socialist Workers' Party (PSOE)
**Murcia**	283,552	Spanish Socialist Workers' Party (PSOE)
**Orense**	88,029	Union of the Democratic Centre (UCD)
**Oviedo**	179,866	Union of the Democratic Centre (UCD)
**Palencia**	65,896	Union of the Democratic Centre (UCD)
**Palma**	283,113	Spanish Socialist Workers' Party (PSOE)
**Pamplona**	173,255	Spanish Socialist Workers' Party (PSOE)
**Pontevedra**	63,863	Union of the Democratic Centre (UCD)
Reus	82,407	Socialists' Party of Catalonia (PSC–PSOE)
Sabadell	187,247	Unified Socialist Party of Catalonia (PSUC)
**Salamanca**	141,474	Spanish Socialist Workers' Party (PSOE)
**San Sebastián**	174,818	Basque Nationalist Party (EAJ/PNV)
Santa Coloma de Gramanet	140,613	Unified Socialist Party of Catalonia (PSUC)
**Santa Cruz de Tenerife**	183,583	Union of the Democratic Centre (UCD)
**Santander**	174,809	Union of the Democratic Centre (UCD)
Santiago de Compostela	81,536	Union of the Democratic Centre (UCD) (PDL in 1982)
**Segovia**	48,623	Union of the Democratic Centre (UCD)
**Seville**	622,532	Socialist Party of Andalusia–Andalusian Party (PSA–PA)
**Soria**	28,845	Union of the Democratic Centre (UCD)
**Tarragona**	108,131	Socialists' Party of Catalonia (PSC–PSOE)
Tarrasa	157,442	Socialists' Party of Catalonia (PSC–PSOE)
**Teruel**	24,590	Union of the Democratic Centre (UCD)
**Toledo**	54,999	Union of the Democratic Centre (UCD)
**Valencia**	737,129	Spanish Socialist Workers' Party (PSOE)
**Valladolid**	308,523	Spanish Socialist Workers' Party (PSOE)
Vigo	254,051	Spanish Socialist Workers' Party (PSOE)
**Vitoria**	181,216	Basque Nationalist Party (EAJ/PNV)
**Zamora**	54,819	Union of the Democratic Centre (UCD)
**Zaragoza**	555,424	Spanish Socialist Workers' Party (PSOE)

=== Provincial and island ===
==== Summary ====
Summary of the 3 April 1979 Spanish provincial and island election results →
Parties and alliances	Seats				
Parties and alliances	PD	IC	FD	Total	+/−
Union of the Democratic Centre (UCD)	717	104	52	873	n/a
Spanish Socialist Workers' Party (PSOE)	279	36	47	362	n/a
Basque Nationalist Party (EAJ/PNV)	—	—	99	99	n/a
Communist Party of Spain (PCE)	62	6	3	71	n/a
Popular Unity (HB)	—	—	47	47	n/a
Convergence and Union (CiU)	45	—	—	45	n/a
Democratic Coalition (CD)	29	9	0	38	n/a
Basque Country Left (EE)	—	—	14	14	n/a
Navarrese People's Union (UPN)	—	—	13	13	n/a
Majorera Assembly (AM)	—	9	—	9	n/a
Canarian People's Union (UPC)	—	8	—	8	n/a
Electoral Groups of Merindad (Amaiur)	—	—	7	7	n/a
Independent Herrenian Group (AHI)	—	6	—	6	n/a
Regionalist Aragonese Party (PAR)	4	—	—	4	n/a
Galician National-Popular Bloc (BNPG)	3	—	—	3	n/a
Basque Nationalists (PNV–EE–ESEI)	—	—	3	3	n/a
Socialist Party of Andalusia–Andalusian Party (PSA–PA)	2	—	—	2	n/a
Galician Unity (PG–POG–PSG)	2	—	—	2	n/a
Neighbours' Assembly (AV)	—	2	—	2	n/a
Socialist Party of Mallorca (PSM)	—	2	—	2	n/a
Socialist Party of Menorca (PSM)	—	2	—	2	n/a
Party of Labour of Spain (PTE)	1	—	0	1	n/a
Regionalist Party of Cantabria (PRC)	1	—	—	1	n/a
Spanish Ruralist Party (PRE)	1	—	—	1	n/a
Assembly Independent Party (PIT)	—	1	—	1	n/a
Carlist Party (PC)	—	—	1	1	n/a
Navarrese Left Union (UNAI)	—	—	1	1	n/a
Navarrese Foral Independents (IFN)	—	—	1	1	n/a
Independents (INDEP)	6	0	10	16	n/a
**Total**	**1,152**	**185**	**298**	1,635	**n/a**

==== Indirectly-elected ====
The following table lists party control in the indirectly-elected provincial deputations.

Province	Population	New control
Albacete	340,964	Spanish Socialist Workers' Party (PSOE)
Alicante	1,117,741	Union of the Democratic Centre (UCD)
Almería	410,976	Union of the Democratic Centre (UCD)
Ávila	110,569	Union of the Democratic Centre (UCD)
Badajoz	663,532	Union of the Democratic Centre (UCD)
Barcelona	4,649,814	Republican Left of Catalonia (ERC) (PSC–PSOE in 1980)
Burgos	362,238	Union of the Democratic Centre (UCD)
Cáceres	441,306	Union of the Democratic Centre (UCD)
Cádiz	999,129	Spanish Socialist Workers' Party (PSOE)
Castellón	421,891	Union of the Democratic Centre (UCD)
Ciudad Real	495,903	Union of the Democratic Centre (UCD)
Córdoba	741,695	Union of the Democratic Centre (UCD)
Cuenca	224,572	Union of the Democratic Centre (UCD)
Gerona	454,477	Convergence and Union (CiU)
Granada	767,145	Union of the Democratic Centre (UCD)
Guadalajara	142,812	Union of the Democratic Centre (UCD)
Huelva	421,813	Union of the Democratic Centre (UCD)
Huesca	213,151	Union of the Democratic Centre (UCD)
Jaén	671,563	Spanish Socialist Workers' Party (PSOE)
La Coruña	1,109,857	Union of the Democratic Centre (UCD)
León	542,444	Union of the Democratic Centre (UCD)
Lérida	351,406	Union of the Democratic Centre (UCD)
Logroño	248,037	Union of the Democratic Centre (UCD)
Lugo	416,972	Union of the Democratic Centre (UCD)
Málaga	989,971	Spanish Socialist Workers' Party (PSOE)
Madrid	4,578,974	Spanish Socialist Workers' Party (PSOE)
Murcia	939,239	Spanish Socialist Workers' Party (PSOE)
Orense	445,232	Union of the Democratic Centre (UCD)
Oviedo	1,162,712	Union of the Democratic Centre (UCD)
Palencia	189,078	Union of the Democratic Centre (UCD)
Pontevedra	888,307	Union of the Democratic Centre (UCD)
Salamanca	358,502	Union of the Democratic Centre (UCD)
Santander	539,829	Union of the Democratic Centre (UCD)
Segovia	152,397	Union of the Democratic Centre (UCD)
Seville	1,452,450	Spanish Socialist Workers' Party (PSOE)
Soria	104,258	Union of the Democratic Centre (UCD)
Tarragona	512,864	Convergence and Union (CiU)
Teruel	157,778	Union of the Democratic Centre (UCD)
Toledo	478,740	Union of the Democratic Centre (UCD)
Valencia	2,028,193	Spanish Socialist Workers' Party (PSOE)
Valladolid	473,773	Union of the Democratic Centre (UCD)
Zamora	232,733	Union of the Democratic Centre (UCD)
Zaragoza	820,862	Union of the Democratic Centre (UCD)

==== Island councils ====
The following table lists party control in the island councils.

Island	Population	New control
El Hierro	?	Independent Herrenian Group (AHI)
Fuerteventura	?	Majorera Assembly (AM)
Gran Canaria	?	Union of the Democratic Centre (UCD)
Ibiza–Formentera	?	People's Alliance (AP)
La Gomera	?	Union of the Democratic Centre (UCD) (AGI in 1983)
La Palma	?	Union of the Democratic Centre (UCD) (AP in 1983)
Lanzarote	?	Union of the Democratic Centre (UCD)
Mallorca	?	Union of the Democratic Centre (UCD)
Menorca	?	Union of the Democratic Centre (UCD)
Tenerife	?	Union of the Democratic Centre (UCD) (ATI in 1983)

==== Foral deputations ====
The following table lists party control in the foral deputations.

Province	Population	New control
Álava	248,605	Basque Nationalist Party (EAJ/PNV)
Biscay	1,208,988	Basque Nationalist Party (EAJ/PNV)
Guipúzcoa	707,968	Basque Nationalist Party (EAJ/PNV)
Navarre	505,260	Union of the Democratic Centre (UCD)

== Bibliography ==
- Ley 41/1975, de 19 de noviembre, de Bases del Estatuto de Régimen Local (Law 41/1975). Official State Gazette (in Spanish). 19 November 1975. BOE-A-1975-23920.
- Real Decreto-ley 18/1977, de 4 de marzo, para la restauración de las Juntas Generales de Guipúzcoa y Vizcaya (Royal Decree 18/1977). Official State Gazette (in Spanish). 4 March 1977. BOE-A-1977-6963.
- Real Decreto-ley 1/1978, de 4 de enero, por el que se aprueba el régimen preautonómico para el País Vasco (Royal Decree 1/1978). Official State Gazette (in Spanish). 4 January 1978. BOE-A-1978-304.
- Ley 39/1978, de 17 de julio, de elecciones locales (Law 39/1978). Official State Gazette (in Spanish). 17 July 1978. BOE-A-1978-18636.
- Constitución Española (Constitution). Official State Gazette (in Spanish). 27 December 1978 [version as of 29 December 1978]. BOE-A-1978-31229.
- Real Decreto 117/1979, de 26 de enero, de convocatoria de Elecciones Locales (Royal Decree 117/1979). Official State Gazette (in Spanish). 26 January 1979. BOE-A-1979-2570.
- Real Decreto 119/1979, de 27 de enero, por el que se regulan las elecciones de los Consejos Insulares del Archipiélago Balear (Royal Decree 119/1979). Official State Gazette (in Spanish). 26 January 1979. BOE-A-1979-2572.
- Real Decreto 121/1979, de 26 de enero, sobre elecciones locales y ordenación de las Instituciones Forales de Navarra (Royal Decree 121/1979). Official State Gazette (in Spanish). 26 January 1979. BOE-A-1979-2574.
- Real Decreto 122/1979, de 26 de enero, por el que se regulan la organización y funcionamiento de las Juntas Generales de Álava (Royal Decree 122/1979). Official State Gazette (in Spanish). 26 January 1979. BOE-A-1979-2575.
- Real Decreto 123/1979, de 26 de enero, por el que se regulan la organización y funcionamiento de las Juntas Generales de Guipúzcoa (Royal Decree 123/1979). Official State Gazette (in Spanish). 26 January 1979. BOE-A-1979-2576.
- Real Decreto 124/1979, de 26 de enero, por el que se regulan la organización y funcionamiento de las Juntas Generales de Vizcaya (Royal Decree 124/1979). Official State Gazette (in Spanish). 26 January 1979. BOE-A-1979-2577.
- Real Decreto 814/1979, de 20 de abril, por el que se convocan Elecciones Municipales parciales (Royal Decree 814/1979). Official State Gazette (in Spanish). 20 April 1979. BOE-A-1979-10578.
- Real Decreto 1834/1979, de 20 de julio, por el que se convocan segundas elecciones municipales parciales (Royal Decree 1834/1979). Official State Gazette (in Spanish). 20 July 1979. BOE-A-1979-18575.
