= Communist Organization of Spain (Red Flag) =

Communist Organization of Spain (Red Flag) Organización Comunista de España (Bandera Roja)
- Secretary-General: Ignasi Faura
- Founded: 1970
- Dissolved: 1994
- Newspaper: Bandera Roja
- Youth wing: Juventudes de Bandera Roja
- Ideology: Marxism-Leninism; Maoism; Antifascism; Federalism; Republicanism
- Political position: Far-left
- Trade union affiliation: Comisiones Obreras (CCOO)

The Communist Organization of Spain (Bandera Roja) (Spanish: Organización Comunista de España (Bandera Roja), Catalan: Organització Comunista d'Espanya - Bandera Roja; OCE-BR), commonly known as Bandera Roja (red flag) was a Maoist communist party in Spain. The newspaper of the organization was Bandera Roja.

== History ==
OCE-BR was founded in 1970 as a split of the PSUC by a sector of its youth wing. The original name was Communist Organization-Red Flag. In 1973 OCE-BR adopted its later name and expanded throughout all Spain. The main goal of the organization was a democratic revolution against the Francoist State, as the first step towards a full socialist revolution.

OCE-BR was legalized in late 1977. The same year the party suffered a split in Catalonia. The splitters, led by Joan Oms i Llohis, founded the Communist Collective of Catalonia. In 1989 OCE-BR joined the PSUC again, finally disappearing as an organization in 1994.
