= 1979 Spanish local elections in Galicia =

This article presents the results breakdown of the local elections held in Galicia on 3 April 1979. The following tables show detailed results in the autonomous community's most populous municipalities, sorted alphabetically.

== City control ==
The following table lists party control in the most populous municipalities, including provincial capitals (highlighted in bold).

Municipality	Population	New control
El Ferrol del Caudillo	88,161	Spanish Socialist Workers' Party (PSOE)
**La Coruña**	224,289	Galician Unity (PG–POG–PSG) (UCD in 1979)
**Lugo**	71,574	Union of the Democratic Centre (UCD)
**Orense**	88,029	Union of the Democratic Centre (UCD)
**Pontevedra**	63,863	Union of the Democratic Centre (UCD)
Santiago de Compostela	81,536	Union of the Democratic Centre (UCD) (PDL in 1982)
Vigo	254,051	Spanish Socialist Workers' Party (PSOE)

== Municipalities ==
=== El Ferrol del Caudillo ===
Population: 88,161

Summary of the 3 April 1979 City Council of El Ferrol del Caudillo election results →
Parties and alliances	Popular vote			Seats	
Parties and alliances	Votes	%	±pp	Total	+/−
Spanish Socialist Workers' Party (PSOE)	9,705	27.26	n/a	**8**	n/a
Union of the Democratic Centre (UCD)	8,843	24.84	n/a	**7**	n/a
Communist Party of Galicia (PCG)	6,752	18.97	n/a	**5**	n/a
Galician Unity (PG–POG–PSG)	4,802	13.49	n/a	**3**	n/a
Democratic Coalition (CD)	3,449	9.69	n/a	**2**	n/a
Galician National-Popular Bloc (BNPG)	1,500	4.21	n/a	0	n/a
Party of Labour of Galicia (PTG)	371	1.04	n/a	0	n/a
Communist Movement of Galicia (MCG)	174	0.49	n/a	0	n/a
Blank ballots	0	0.00	n/a		
**Total**	**35,596**			**25**	**n/a**
Valid votes	35,596	99.06	n/a		
Invalid votes	338	0.94	n/a		
**Votes cast / turnout**	**35,934**	**55.39**	**n/a**		
Abstentions	28,940	44.61	n/a		
**Registered voters**	**64,874**				

=== La Coruña ===
Population: 224,289

Summary of the 3 April 1979 City Council of La Coruña election results →
Parties and alliances	Popular vote			Seats	
Parties and alliances	Votes	%	±pp	Total	+/−
Union of the Democratic Centre (UCD)	24,480	28.05	n/a	**8**	n/a
Spanish Socialist Workers' Party (PSOE)	17,903	20.51	n/a	**6**	n/a
Galician Unity (PG–POG–PSG)	15,060	17.26	n/a	**5**	n/a
Democratic Coalition (CD)	11,428	13.09	n/a	**4**	n/a
Communist Party of Galicia (PCG)	7,639	8.75	n/a	**2**	n/a
Galician National-Popular Bloc (BNPG)	7,268	8.33	n/a	**2**	n/a
Party of Labour of Galicia (PTG)	1,576	1.81	n/a	0	n/a
Communist Movement of Galicia (MCG)	894	1.02	n/a	0	n/a
Spanish Phalanx of the CNSO (FE–JONS)	756	0.87	n/a	0	n/a
Revolutionary Communist League (LCR)	269	0.31	n/a	0	n/a
Blank ballots	0	0.00	n/a		
**Total**	**87,273**			**27**	**n/a**
Valid votes	87,273	98.14	n/a		
Invalid votes	1,654	1.86	n/a		
**Votes cast / turnout**	**88,927**	**53.54**	**n/a**		
Abstentions	77,179	46.46	n/a		
**Registered voters**	**166,106**				

=== Lugo ===
Population: 71,574

Summary of the 3 April 1979 City Council of Lugo election results →
Parties and alliances	Popular vote			Seats	
Parties and alliances	Votes	%	±pp	Total	+/−
Union of the Democratic Centre (UCD)	8,179	27.20	n/a	**8**	n/a
Democratic Coalition (CD)	4,505	14.98	n/a	**4**	n/a
Independents (INDEP)	4,362	14.50	n/a	**4**	n/a
Spanish Socialist Workers' Party (PSOE)	4,081	13.57	n/a	**4**	n/a
Independent Candidacy for Lugo (CIL)	4,013	13.34	n/a	**3**	n/a
Galician National-Popular Bloc (BNPG)	2,168	7.21	n/a	**2**	n/a
Communist Party of Galicia (PCG)	1,478	4.91	n/a	0	n/a
Spanish National Union (UNE)	931	3.10	n/a	0	n/a
Party of Labour of Galicia (PTG)	304	1.01	n/a	0	n/a
Communist Movement of Galicia (MCG)	54	0.18	n/a	0	n/a
Blank ballots	0	0.00	n/a		
**Total**	**30,075**			**25**	**n/a**
Valid votes	30,075	100.00	n/a		
Invalid votes	0	0.00	n/a		
**Votes cast / turnout**	**30,075**	**56.79**	**n/a**		
Abstentions	22,882	43.21	n/a		
**Registered voters**	**52,957**				

=== Orense ===
Population: 88,029

Summary of the 3 April 1979 City Council of Orense election results →
Parties and alliances	Popular vote			Seats	
Parties and alliances	Votes	%	±pp	Total	+/−
Union of the Democratic Centre (UCD)	10,514	32.22	n/a	**9**	n/a
Democratic Coalition (CD)	6,638	20.34	n/a	**5**	n/a
Spanish Socialist Workers' Party (PSOE)	5,867	17.98	n/a	**5**	n/a
Communist Party of Galicia (PCG)	2,962	9.08	n/a	**2**	n/a
Galician National-Popular Bloc (BNPG)	2,934	8.99	n/a	**2**	n/a
Independents (INDEP)	2,237	6.86	n/a	**2**	n/a
Spanish Socialist Workers' Party (historical) (PSOEh)	1,228	3.76	n/a	0	n/a
Communist Movement of Galicia (MCG)	252	0.77	n/a	0	n/a
Blank ballots	0	0.00	n/a		
**Total**	**32,632**			**25**	**n/a**
Valid votes	32,632	98.78	n/a		
Invalid votes	402	1.22	n/a		
**Votes cast / turnout**	**33,034**	**51.12**	**n/a**		
Abstentions	31,589	48.88	n/a		
**Registered voters**	**64,623**				

=== Pontevedra ===
Population: 63,863

Summary of the 3 April 1979 City Council of Pontevedra election results →
Parties and alliances	Popular vote			Seats	
Parties and alliances	Votes	%	±pp	Total	+/−
Union of the Democratic Centre (UCD)	7,467	32.00	n/a	**9**	n/a
Galician Unity (PG–POG–PSG)	5,234	22.43	n/a	**6**	n/a
Independent Candidacy (CI)	3,213	13.77	n/a	**4**	n/a
Spanish Socialist Workers' Party (PSOE)	2,756	11.81	n/a	**3**	n/a
Democratic Coalition (CD)	1,407	6.03	n/a	**1**	n/a
Galician National-Popular Bloc (BNPG)	1,302	5.58	n/a	**1**	n/a
Communist Party of Galicia (PCG)	1,266	5.43	n/a	**1**	n/a
Party of Labour of Galicia (PTG)	557	2.39	n/a	0	n/a
Communist Movement of Galicia (MCG)	133	0.57	n/a	0	n/a
Blank ballots	0	0.00	n/a		
**Total**	**23,335**			**25**	**n/a**
Valid votes	23,335	98.71	n/a		
Invalid votes	304	1.29	n/a		
**Votes cast / turnout**	**23,639**	**53.32**	**n/a**		
Abstentions	20,695	46.68	n/a		
**Registered voters**	**44,334**				

=== Santiago de Compostela ===
Population: 81,536

Summary of the 3 April 1979 City Council of Santiago de Compostela election results →
Parties and alliances	Popular vote			Seats	
Parties and alliances	Votes	%	±pp	Total	+/−
Union of the Democratic Centre (UCD)	9,663	35.07	n/a	**10**	n/a
Galician Unity (PG–POG–PSG)	4,871	17.68	n/a	**5**	n/a
Democratic Coalition (CD)	3,694	13.41	n/a	**3**	n/a
Spanish Socialist Workers' Party (PSOE)	3,305	12.00	n/a	**3**	n/a
Galician National-Popular Bloc (BNPG)	2,580	9.36	n/a	**2**	n/a
Communist Party of Galicia (PCG)	2,559	9.29	n/a	**2**	n/a
Party of Labour of Galicia (PTG)	622	2.26	n/a	0	n/a
Communist Movement of Galicia (MCG)	257	0.93	n/a	0	n/a
Blank ballots	0	0.00	n/a		
**Total**	**27,551**			**25**	**n/a**
Valid votes	27,551	97.93	n/a		
Invalid votes	582	2.07	n/a		
**Votes cast / turnout**	**28,133**	**49.06**	**n/a**		
Abstentions	29,215	50.94	n/a		
**Registered voters**	**57,348**				

=== Vigo ===
Population: 254,051

Summary of the 3 April 1979 City Council of Vigo election results →
Parties and alliances	Popular vote			Seats	
Parties and alliances	Votes	%	±pp	Total	+/−
Union of the Democratic Centre (UCD)	26,153	30.19	n/a	**9**	n/a
Spanish Socialist Workers' Party (PSOE)	22,789	26.30	n/a	**8**	n/a
Democratic Coalition (CD)	10,217	11.79	n/a	**3**	n/a
Galician Unity (PG–POG–PSG)	8,942	10.32	n/a	**3**	n/a
Communist Party of Galicia (PCG)	8,901	10.27	n/a	**3**	n/a
Galician National-Popular Bloc (BNPG)	5,497	6.34	n/a	**1**	n/a
Electors' Group (Electores)	1,926	2.22	n/a	0	n/a
Party of Labour of Galicia (PTG)	962	1.11	n/a	0	n/a
Communist Movement of Galicia (MCG)	728	0.84	n/a	0	n/a
Revolutionary Communist League (LCR)	527	0.61	n/a	0	n/a
Blank ballots	0	0.00	n/a		
**Total**	**86,642**			**27**	**n/a**
Valid votes	86,642	98.23	n/a		
Invalid votes	1,562	1.77	n/a		
**Votes cast / turnout**	**88,204**	**51.54**	**n/a**		
Abstentions	82,917	48.46	n/a		
**Registered voters**	**171,121**				
