= Huesca (Congress of Deputies constituency) =

Electoral constituency in Spain

Coordinates: 42°10′N 2°10′W

- Congress of Deputies; Electoral constituency
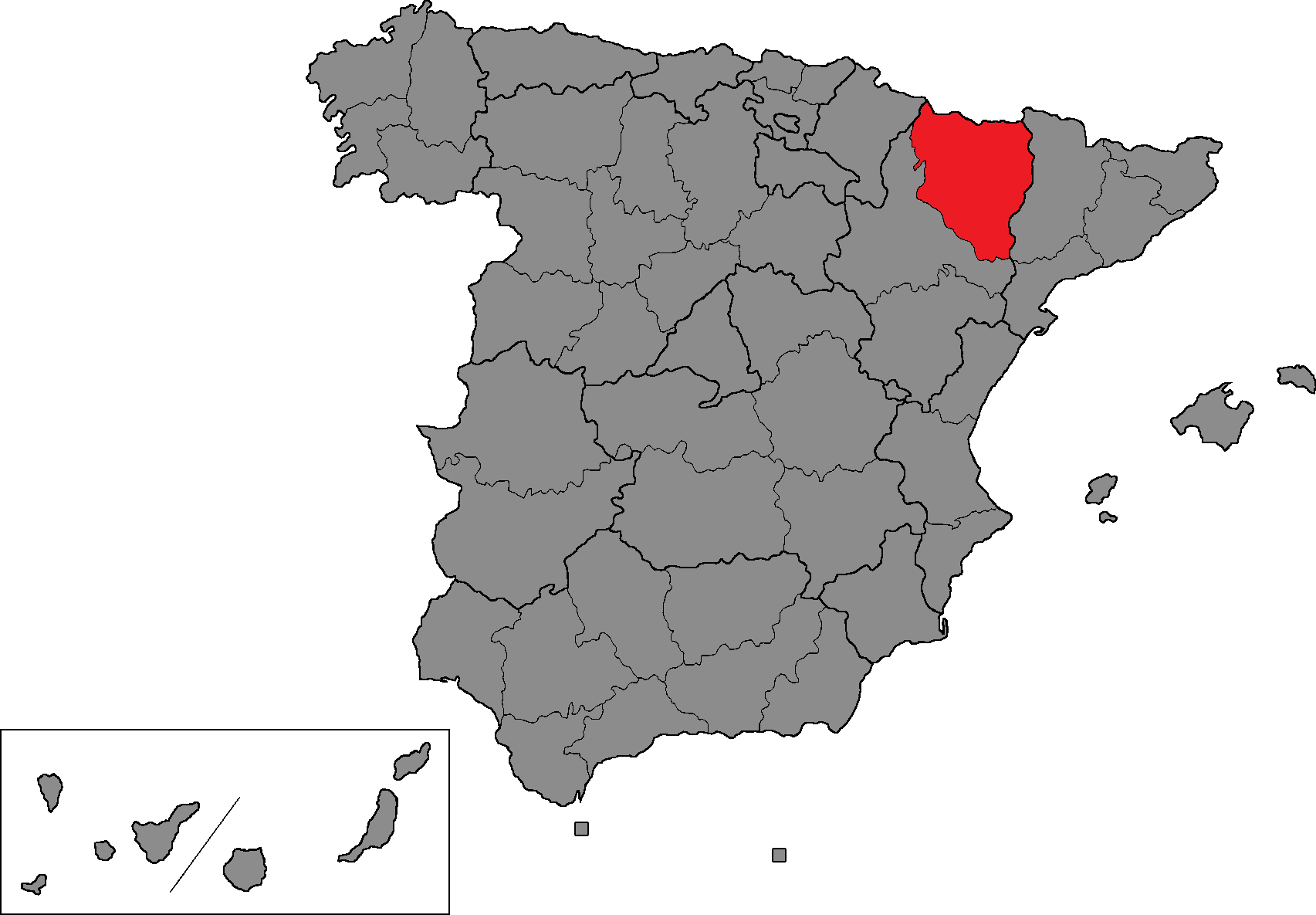
- Location of Huesca within Spain
- Province: Huesca
- Autonomous community: Aragon
- Population: ▲228,634 (2024)
- Electorate: ▲173,391 (2023)
- Major settlements: Huesca

Current constituency
- Created: 1977
- Seats: 3
- Members: PP (2); PSOE (1)

Huesca is one of the 52 constituencies represented in the Congress of Deputies, the lower chamber of the Spanish parliament, the Cortes Generales. The constituency (whose boundaries correspond to those of the homonymous province) currently elects three deputies. The electoral system uses the D'Hondt method and closed-list proportional voting, with a minimum threshold of three percent.

== Electoral system ==
The constituency was created as per the Political Reform Law and was first contested in the 1977 general election. The Law provided for the provinces of Spain to be established as multi-member districts in the Congress of Deputies, with this regulation being maintained under the Spanish Constitution of 1978. Additionally, the Constitution requires for any modification of the provincial limits to be approved under an organic law, needing an absolute majority in the Cortes Generales.

Voting is based on universal suffrage, comprising all Spanish nationals over 18 years of age with full political rights, provided that they have not been deprived of the right to vote by a final sentence. The only exception was in 1977, when this was limited to nationals over 21 years of age and in full enjoyment of their political and civil rights. Amendments in 2011 required non-resident citizens to apply for voting, a system known as "begged" voting (Spanish: Voto rogado). which was abolished in 2022. Further, amendments in 2018 granted the right to vote to those legally incapacitated. The Congress of Deputies has a minimum of 300 and a maximum of 400 seats, with electoral provisions fixing its size at 350. Of these, 348 are elected in 50 multi-member constituencies corresponding to the provinces of Spain—each of which is assigned an initial minimum of two seats and the remaining 248 distributed in proportion to population—using the D'Hondt method and closed-list proportional voting, with a three percent-threshold of valid votes (including blank ballots) in each constituency. The remaining two seats are allocated to Ceuta and Melilla as single-member districts elected by plurality voting. The use of this electoral method may result in a higher effective threshold depending on district magnitude and vote distribution. The law does not provide for by-elections to fill vacant seats; instead, any vacancies arising after the proclamation of candidates and during the legislative term are filled by the next candidates on the party lists or, when required, by designated substitutes.

The electoral law allows for parties and federations registered in the interior ministry, alliances and groupings of electors to present lists of candidates. Parties and federations intending to form an alliance are required to inform the relevant electoral commission within 10 days of the election call—15 before 1985—whereas groupings of electors need to secure the signature of at least one percent of the electorate in the constituencies for which they seek election—one permille of the electorate, with a compulsory minimum of 500 signatures, until 1985—disallowing electors from signing for more than one list. Also since 2011, parties, federations or alliances that have not obtained a mandate in either chamber of the Cortes at the preceding election are required to secure the signature of at least 0.1 percent of electors in the aforementioned constituencies. Amendments in 2007 required a balanced composition of men and women in the electoral lists, so that candidates of either sex made up at least 40 percent of the total composition; further amendments in 2024 required the use of a zipper system.

== Deputies ==
Deputies 1977–present
Key to parties U.Podemos Podemos PSOE Cs UCD PP CP AP
Legislature	Election	Distribution
Constituent	1977	1 / 2
1st	1979	1 / 2
2nd	1982	2 / 1
3rd	1986	2 / 1
4th	1989	2 / 1
5th	1993	2 / 1
6th	1996	1 / 2
7th	2000	1 / 2
8th	2004	2 / 1
9th	2008	2 / 1
10th	2011	1 / 2
11th	2015	1 / 1 / 1
12th	2016	1 / 1 / 1
13th	2019 (Apr)	1 / 1 / 1
14th	2019 (Nov)	2 / 1
15th	2023	1 / 2

== General elections ==
=== 2026 ===
Summary of the 29 November 2026 Congress of Deputies election results in Huesca
Parties and alliances	Popular vote			Seats	
Parties and alliances	Votes	%	±pp	Total	+/−
People's Party (PP)					
Spanish Socialist Workers' Party (PSOE)					
Vox (Vox)					
Aragonese Union–Broad Front Aragon (CHA–IU–MS–Frente Amplio)^{1}			n/a		
We Can (Podemos)^{1}			n/a		
Animalist Party with the Environment (PACMA)					
Workers' Front (FO)					
Communist Party of the Workers of Spain (PCTE)					
For a Fairer World (M+J)					
Federation of Independents of Aragon (FIA)					
The Party is Over (SALF)			New		
Blank ballots					
Total				3	±0
Valid votes					
Invalid votes					
Votes cast / turnout					
Abstentions					
Registered voters	175,954				
Sources
Footnotes: ^{1} Within the Unite Aragon alliance in the 2023 election.

=== 2023 ===
Summary of the 23 July 2023 Congress of Deputies election results in Huesca
Parties and alliances	Popular vote			Seats	
Parties and alliances	Votes	%	±pp	Total	+/−
People's Party (PP)	45,783	38.19	+11.95	2	+1
Spanish Socialist Workers' Party (PSOE)	40,307	33.62	+0.08	1	–1
Vox (Vox)	15,155	12.64	–2.53	0	±0
Unite Aragon (Sumar Aragón)^{1}	13,774	11.49	–2.63	0	±0
Aragon Exists–Exists Coalition (Existe)	1,312	1.09	New	0	±0
Aragonese Party (PAR)	717	0.60	New	0	±0
Animalist Party with the Environment (PACMA)^{2}	498	0.42	–0.23	0	±0
Blank Seats to Leave Empty Seats (EB)	475	0.40	+0.05	0	±0
Workers' Front (FO)	258	0.22	New	0	±0
Communist Party of the Workers of Spain (PCTE)	137	0.11	+0.03	0	±0
For a Fairer World (PUM+J)	114	0.10	–0.03	0	±0
Federation of Independents of Aragon (FIA)	84	0.07	±0.00	0	±0
Zero Cuts (Recortes Cero)	64	0.05	–0.12	0	±0
Blank ballots	1,217	1.02	–0.18		
Total	119,895			3	±0
Valid votes	119,895	98.97	+0.01		
Invalid votes	1,253	1.03	–0.01		
Votes cast / turnout	121,148	69.87	+3.41		
Abstentions	52,243	30.13	–3.41		
Registered voters	173,391				
Sources
Footnotes: ^{1} Unite Aragon results are compared to the combined totals of United We Can and Aragonese Union in the November 2019 election.; ^{2} Animalist Party with the Environment results are compared to Animalist Party Against Mistreatment of Animals totals in the November 2019 election.

=== November 2019 ===
Summary of the 10 November 2019 Congress of Deputies election results in Huesca
Parties and alliances	Popular vote			Seats	
Parties and alliances	Votes	%	±pp	Total	+/−
Spanish Socialist Workers' Party (PSOE)	38,101	33.54	+0.54	2	+1
People's Party (PP)	29,804	26.24	+6.17	1	±0
Vox (Vox)	17,237	15.17	+4.49	0	±0
United We Can (Podemos–IU–AltoAragón en Común)	14,035	12.36	–1.33	0	±0
Citizens–Party of the Citizenry (Cs)	9,244	8.14	–11.47	0	–1
Aragonese Union (CHA)	2,000	1.76	New	0	±0
Animalist Party Against Mistreatment of Animals (PACMA)	735	0.65	–0.16	0	±0
Blank Seats (EB)	393	0.35	–0.03	0	±0
Zero Cuts–Green Group (Recortes Cero–GV)	198	0.17	–0.06	0	±0
For a Fairer World (PUM+J)	153	0.13	–0.01	0	±0
Communist Party of the Peoples of Spain (PCPE)	100	0.09	–0.08	0	±0
Communist Party of the Workers of Spain (PCTE)	86	0.08	New	0	±0
Federation of Independents of Aragon (FIA)	75	0.07	–0.03	0	±0
Puyalón (PYLN)	73	0.06	–0.06	0	±0
Blank ballots	1,363	1.20	+0.19		
Total	113,597			3	±0
Valid votes	113,597	98.96	+0.07		
Invalid votes	1,194	1.04	–0.07		
Votes cast / turnout	114,791	66.46	–6.94		
Abstentions	57,931	33.54	+6.94		
Registered voters	172,722				

=== April 2019 ===
Summary of the 28 April 2019 Congress of Deputies election results in Huesca
Parties and alliances	Popular vote			Seats	
Parties and alliances	Votes	%	±pp	Total	+/−
Spanish Socialist Workers' Party (PSOE)	41,354	33.00	+7.41	1	±0
People's Party (PP)	25,149	20.07	–16.15	1	±0
Citizens–Party of the Citizenry (Cs)	24,568	19.61	+4.27	1	+1
United We Can (Podemos–IU–Equo–AltoAragón en Común)	17,151	13.69	–5.50	0	–1
Vox (Vox)	13,389	10.68	+10.34	0	±0
Animalist Party Against Mistreatment of Animals (PACMA)	1,013	0.81	+0.03	0	±0
Blank Seats (EB)	474	0.38	–0.04	0	±0
Zero Cuts–Green Group (Recortes Cero–GV)	284	0.23	+0.05	0	±0
Communist Party of the Peoples of Spain (PCPE)	216	0.17	–0.13	0	±0
For a Fairer World (PUM+J)	170	0.14	New	0	±0
Puyalón (PYLN)	148	0.12	New	0	±0
Federation of Independents of Aragon (FIA)	127	0.10	New	0	±0
Blank ballots	1,271	1.01	–0.02		
Total	125,314			3	±0
Valid votes	125,314	98.89	–0.15		
Invalid votes	1,406	1.11	+0.15		
Votes cast / turnout	126,720	73.40	+5.40		
Abstentions	45,924	26.60	–5.40		
Registered voters	172,644				

=== 2016 ===
Summary of the 26 June 2016 Congress of Deputies election results in Huesca
Parties and alliances	Popular vote			Seats	
Parties and alliances	Votes	%	±pp	Total	+/−
People's Party–Aragonese Party (PP–PAR)	42,332	36.22	+3.68	1	±0
Spanish Socialist Workers' Party (PSOE)	29,915	25.59	+0.88	1	±0
United We Can in Upper Aragon (Podemos–IU–Equo)^{1}	22,430	19.19	–4.04	1	±0
Citizens–Party of the Citizenry (C's)	17,934	15.34	–0.86	0	±0
Animalist Party Against Mistreatment of Animals (PACMA)	909	0.78	+0.07	0	±0
Blank Seats (EB)	487	0.42	–0.03	0	±0
Vox (Vox)	399	0.34	New	0	±0
Forward (Entabán)	377	0.32	New	0	±0
Communist Party of the Peoples of Spain (PCPE)	349	0.30	+0.09	0	±0
Union, Progress and Democracy (UPyD)	239	0.20	–0.48	0	±0
Zero Cuts–Green Group (Recortes Cero–GV)	216	0.18	–0.02	0	±0
Social Aragonese Movement (MAS)	93	0.08	New	0	±0
Blank ballots	1,204	1.03	+0.01		
Total	116,884			3	±0
Valid votes	116,884	99.04	–0.03		
Invalid votes	1,134	0.96	+0.03		
Votes cast / turnout	118,018	68.00	–2.83		
Abstentions	55,528	32.00	+2.83		
Registered voters	173,546				
Sources
Footnotes: ^{1} United We Can in Upper Aragon results are compared to the combined totals of We Can–Now Upper Aragon in Common and United Left–Aragonese Union–Popular Unity in Common in the 2015 election.

=== 2015 ===
Summary of the 20 December 2015 Congress of Deputies election results in Huesca
Parties and alliances	Popular vote			Seats	
Parties and alliances	Votes	%	±pp	Total	+/−
People's Party–Aragonese Party (PP–PAR)	39,747	32.54	–15.93	1	–1
Spanish Socialist Workers' Party (PSOE)	30,183	24.71	–9.06	1	±0
We Can–Now Upper Aragon in Common (Podemos–Ahora AltoAragón)	21,943	17.96	New	1	+1
Citizens–Party of the Citizenry (C's)	19,789	16.20	New	0	±0
United Left–Aragonese Union–Popular Unity in Common (IU–CHA–UPeC)	6,433	5.27	–2.97	0	±0
Union, Progress and Democracy (UPyD)	833	0.68	–3.81	0	±0
Animalist Party Against Mistreatment of Animals (PACMA)	792	0.65	+0.19	0	±0
Blank Seats (EB)	554	0.45	New	0	±0
Communist Party of the Peoples of Spain (PCPE)	257	0.21	–0.08	0	±0
Zero Cuts–Green Group (Recortes Cero–GV)	249	0.20	New	0	±0
Independents for Aragon (i)	114	0.09	New	0	±0
Blank ballots	1,251	1.02	–1.38		
Total	122,145			3	±0
Valid votes	122,145	99.07	+0.80		
Invalid votes	1,152	0.93	–0.80		
Votes cast / turnout	123,297	70.83	+1.01		
Abstentions	50,775	29.17	–1.01		
Registered voters	174,072				

=== 2011 ===
Summary of the 20 November 2011 Congress of Deputies election results in Huesca
Parties and alliances	Popular vote			Seats	
Parties and alliances	Votes	%	±pp	Total	+/−
People's Party–Aragonese Party (PP–PAR)^{1}	58,435	48.47	+5.81	2	+1
Spanish Socialist Workers' Party (PSOE)	40,721	33.77	–13.83	1	–1
Aragonese Union–United Left: Plural Left (CHA–IU)^{2}	9,937	8.24	+2.42	0	±0
Union, Progress and Democracy (UPyD)	5,408	4.49	+3.19	0	±0
Equo (Equo)	1,471	1.22	New	0	±0
Animalist Party Against Mistreatment of Animals (PACMA)	558	0.46	+0.32	0	±0
Pirate Party (Pirata)	403	0.33	New	0	±0
Communist Party of the Peoples of Spain (PCPE)	354	0.29	+0.24	0	±0
For a Fairer World (PUM+J)	286	0.24	+0.17	0	±0
Communist Unification of Spain (UCE)	107	0.09	New	0	±0
Blank ballots	2,890	2.40	+1.07		
Total	120,570			3	±0
Valid votes	120,570	98.27	–1.15		
Invalid votes	2,117	1.73	+1.15		
Votes cast / turnout	122,687	69.82	–5.65		
Abstentions	53,026	30.18	+5.65		
Registered voters	175,713				
Sources
Footnotes: ^{1} People's Party–Aragonese Party results are compared to the combined totals of the People's Party and Aragonese Party in the 2008 election.; ^{2} Aragonese Union–United Left: Plural Left results are compared to the combined totals of Aragonese Union and United Left in the 2008 election.

=== 2008 ===
Summary of the 9 March 2008 Congress of Deputies election results in Huesca
Parties and alliances	Popular vote			Seats	
Parties and alliances	Votes	%	±pp	Total	+/−
Spanish Socialist Workers' Party (PSOE)	62,954	47.60	+1.94	2	±0
People's Party (PP)	49,748	37.62	+0.13	1	±0
Aragonese Party (PAR)	6,665	5.04	±0.00	0	±0
Aragonese Union (CHA)	3,892	2.94	–3.47	0	±0
United Left (IU)	3,815	2.88	+0.17	0	±0
Union, Progress and Democracy (UPyD)	1,719	1.30	New	0	±0
The Greens–Green Group (LV–GV)	561	0.42	New	0	±0
Anti-Bullfighting Party Against Mistreatment of Animals (PACMA)	179	0.14	New	0	±0
Citizens for Blank Votes (CenB)	169	0.13	+0.02	0	±0
Citizens–Party of the Citizenry (C's)	129	0.10	New	0	±0
National Alliance (AN)	98	0.07	New	0	±0
For a Fairer World (PUM+J)	95	0.07	New	0	±0
Social Democratic Party–Federation of Independents of Aragon (PSD–FIA)	79	0.05	New	0	±0
National Democracy (DN)	76	0.06	–0.11	0	±0
Communist Party of the Peoples of Spain (PCPE)	65	0.05	–0.03	0	±0
Spanish Phalanx of the CNSO (FE de las JONS)	61	0.05	+0.01	0	±0
Aragon United Citizens Party (pCUA)	52	0.04	New	0	±0
Family and Life Party (PFyV)	50	0.04	–0.01	0	±0
Authentic Phalanx (FA)	38	0.03	+0.01	0	±0
Humanist Party (PH)	30	0.02	–0.03	0	±0
Spanish Alternative (AES)	21	0.02	New	0	±0
Blank ballots	1,759	1.33	–0.62		
Total	132,255			3	±0
Valid votes	132,255	99.42	+0.09		
Invalid votes	776	0.58	–0.09		
Votes cast / turnout	133,031	75.47	–1.15		
Abstentions	43,234	24.53	+1.15		
Registered voters	176,265				

=== 2004 ===
Summary of the 14 March 2004 Congress of Deputies election results in Huesca
Parties and alliances	Popular vote			Seats	
Parties and alliances	Votes	%	±pp	Total	+/−
Spanish Socialist Workers' Party (PSOE)	61,500	45.66	+8.60	2	+1
People's Party (PP)	50,493	37.49	–7.64	1	–1
Aragonese Union (CHA)	8,629	6.41	+0.89	0	±0
Aragonese Party (PAR)	6,782	5.04	–1.50	0	±0
United Left–The Greens (IU–LV)	3,650	2.71	–0.40	0	±0
National Democracy (DN)	225	0.17	New	0	±0
Citizens for Blank Votes (CenB)	149	0.11	New	0	±0
Republican Left (IR)	118	0.09	New	0	±0
Democratic and Social Centre (CDS)	117	0.09	New	0	±0
Communist Party of the Peoples of Spain (PCPE)	102	0.08	New	0	±0
Family and Life Party (PFyV)	74	0.05	New	0	±0
Humanist Party (PH)	65	0.05	–0.01	0	±0
Republican Social Movement (MSR)	49	0.04	New	0	±0
Spanish Phalanx of the CNSO (FE de las JONS)	48	0.04	New	0	±0
The Phalanx (FE)	34	0.03	New	0	±0
Authentic Phalanx (FA)	25	0.02	New	0	±0
Blank ballots	2,627	1.95	+0.24		
Total	134,687			3	±0
Valid votes	134,687	99.33	+0.16		
Invalid votes	908	0.67	–0.16		
Votes cast / turnout	135,595	76.62	+5.86		
Abstentions	41,376	23.38	–5.86		
Registered voters	176,971				

=== 2000 ===
Summary of the 12 March 2000 Congress of Deputies election results in Huesca
Parties and alliances	Popular vote			Seats	
Parties and alliances	Votes	%	±pp	Total	+/−
People's Party (PP)	56,610	45.13	–0.47	2	±0
Spanish Socialist Workers' Party–Progressives (PSOE–p)	46,490	37.06	–4.02	1	±0
Aragonese Party (PAR)	8,207	6.54	New	0	±0
Aragonese Union (CHA)	6,926	5.52	+2.15	0	±0
United Left of Aragon (IU)	3,898	3.11	–4.43	0	±0
The Greens–Green Group–SOS Nature (LV–GV)	819	0.65	+0.11	0	±0
Aragonese Initiative (INAR)	137	0.11	New	0	±0
Natural Law Party (PLN)	86	0.07	New	0	±0
Humanist Party (PH)	71	0.06	New	0	±0
Catalan State (EC)	63	0.05	New	0	±0
Blank ballots	2,142	1.71	+0.25		
Total	125,449			3	±0
Valid votes	125,449	99.17	–0.18		
Invalid votes	1,055	0.83	+0.18		
Votes cast / turnout	126,504	70.76	–6.65		
Abstentions	52,282	29.24	+6.65		
Registered voters	178,786				

=== 1996 ===
Summary of the 3 March 1996 Congress of Deputies election results in Huesca
Parties and alliances	Popular vote			Seats	
Parties and alliances	Votes	%	±pp	Total	+/−
People's Party–Aragonese Party (PP–PAR)^{1}	61,900	45.60	–4.54	2	+1
Spanish Socialist Workers' Party (PSOE)	55,766	41.08	+3.03	1	–1
United Left of Aragon (IU)	10,230	7.54	+0.22	0	±0
Aragonese Union (CHA)	4,571	3.37	+2.45	0	±0
SOS Nature (SOS)	727	0.54	New	0	±0
Centrist Union (UC)	294	0.22	–1.91	0	±0
Workers' Revolutionary Party (PRT)	167	0.12	New	0	±0
Authentic Spanish Phalanx (FEA)	115	0.08	New	0	±0
Blank ballots	1,980	1.46	+0.69		
Total	135,750			3	±0
Valid votes	135,750	99.35	–0.01		
Invalid votes	883	0.65	+0.01		
Votes cast / turnout	136,633	77.41	±0.00		
Abstentions	39,877	22.59	±0.00		
Registered voters	176,510				
Sources
Footnotes: ^{1} People's Party–Aragonese Party results are compared to the combined totals of the People's Party and the Aragonese Party in the 1993 election.

=== 1993 ===
Summary of the 6 June 1993 Congress of Deputies election results in Huesca
Parties and alliances	Popular vote			Seats	
Parties and alliances	Votes	%	±pp	Total	+/−
Spanish Socialist Workers' Party (PSOE)	50,720	38.05	–2.40	2	±0
People's Party (PP)	43,059	32.30	+6.80	1	±0
Aragonese Party (PAR)	23,784	17.84	+5.69	0	±0
United Left of Aragon (IU)	9,756	7.32	–0.41	0	±0
Democratic and Social Centre (CDS)	2,840	2.13	–6.40	0	±0
Aragonese Union (CHA)	1,229	0.92	+0.17	0	±0
Natural Law Party (PLN)	364	0.27	New	0	±0
Ruiz-Mateos Group–Independent Party–Social Movement (ARM–PAI–MAS)	309	0.23	–0.67	0	±0
Revolutionary Workers' Party (POR)	125	0.09	New	0	±0
Coalition for a New Socialist Party (CNPS)^{1}	81	0.06	–0.04	0	±0
Communist Unification of Spain (UCE)	0	0.00	New	0	±0
Blank ballots	1,033	0.77	–0.13		
Total	133,300			3	±0
Valid votes	133,300	99.36	+0.44		
Invalid votes	865	0.64	–0.44		
Votes cast / turnout	134,165	77.41	+7.28		
Abstentions	39,160	22.59	–7.28		
Registered voters	173,325				
Sources
Footnotes: ^{1} Coalition for a New Socialist Party results are compared to Alliance for the Republic totals in the 1989 election.

=== 1989 ===
Summary of the 29 October 1989 Congress of Deputies election results in Huesca
Parties and alliances	Popular vote			Seats	
Parties and alliances	Votes	%	±pp	Total	+/−
Spanish Socialist Workers' Party (PSOE)	47,491	40.45	–4.07	2	±0
People's Party (PP)^{1}	29,938	25.50	+0.42	1	±0
Regionalist Aragonese Party (PAR)	14,260	12.15	–2.39	0	±0
Democratic and Social Centre (CDS)	10,015	8.53	–4.26	0	±0
United Left (IU)	9,074	7.73	+4.44	0	±0
The Ecologist Greens (LVE)	1,405	1.20	New	0	±0
Ruiz-Mateos Group (Ruiz-Mateos)	1,058	0.90	New	0	±0
Aragonese Union (UA–CHA)	875	0.75	New	0	±0
Workers' Socialist Party (PST)	870	0.74	+0.34	0	±0
Social Democratic Coalition (CSD)	412	0.35	New	0	±0
Workers' Party of Spain–Communist Unity (PTE–UC)^{2}	368	0.31	–0.55	0	±0
Communist Party of the Peoples of Spain (PCPE)	237	0.20	New	0	±0
Alliance for the Republic (AxR)^{3}	120	0.10	–0.21	0	±0
Humanist Party (PH)	118	0.10	New	0	±0
Spanish Phalanx of the CNSO (FE–JONS)	103	0.09	New	0	±0
Blank ballots	1,051	0.90	+0.08		
Total	117,395			3	±0
Valid votes	117,395	98.92	+1.21		
Invalid votes	1,285	1.08	–1.21		
Votes cast / turnout	118,680	70.13	–0.01		
Abstentions	50,548	29.87	+0.01		
Registered voters	169,228				
Sources
Footnotes: ^{1} People's Party results are compared to People's Coalition totals in the 1986 election.; ^{2} Workers' Party of Spain–Communist Unity results are compared to Communists' Unity Board totals in the 1986 election.; ^{3} Alliance for the Republic results are compared to Internationalist Socialist Workers' Party totals in the 1986 election.

=== 1986 ===
Summary of the 22 June 1986 Congress of Deputies election results in Huesca
Parties and alliances	Popular vote			Seats	
Parties and alliances	Votes	%	±pp	Total	+/−
Spanish Socialist Workers' Party (PSOE)	53,764	44.52	–3.84	2	±0
People's Coalition (AP–PDP–PL)^{1}	30,289	25.08	–0.93	1	±0
Democratic and Social Centre (CDS)	15,446	12.79	+7.90	0	±0
Regionalist Aragonese Party (PAR)	11,786	9.76	New	0	±0
United Left (IU)^{2}	3,978	3.29	+0.75	0	±0
Democratic Reformist Party (PRD)	1,914	1.58	New	0	±0
Communists' Unity Board (MUC)	1,043	0.86	New	0	±0
Workers' Socialist Party (PST)	486	0.40	–0.08	0	±0
Internationalist Socialist Workers' Party (POSI)	380	0.31	New	0	±0
Communist Unification of Spain (UCE)	353	0.29	+0.06	0	±0
Republican Popular Unity (UPR)^{3}	241	0.20	+0.01	0	±0
Party of the Communists of Catalonia (PCC)	105	0.09	New	0	±0
Blank ballots	991	0.82	+0.19		
Total	120,776			3	±0
Valid votes	120,776	97.71	+1.46		
Invalid votes	2,826	2.29	–1.46		
Votes cast / turnout	123,602	70.14	–11.11		
Abstentions	52,629	29.86	+11.11		
Registered voters	176,231				
Sources
Footnotes: ^{1} People's Coalition results are compared to People's Alliance–People's Democratic–Aragonese Party totals in the 1982 election.; ^{2} United Left results are compared to Communist Party of Aragon totals in the 1982 election.; ^{3} Republican Popular Unity results are compared to Communist Party of Spain (Marxist–Leninist) totals in the 1982 election.

=== 1982 ===
Summary of the 28 October 1982 Congress of Deputies election results in Huesca
Parties and alliances	Popular vote			Seats	
Parties and alliances	Votes	%	±pp	Total	+/−
Spanish Socialist Workers' Party (PSOE)	63,103	48.36	+13.65	2	+1
People's Alliance–People's Democratic–Aragonese Party (AP–PDP–PAR)^{1}	33,945	26.01	+21.53	1	+1
Union of the Democratic Centre (UCD)	19,234	14.74	–33.19	0	–2
Democratic and Social Centre (CDS)	6,375	4.89	New	0	±0
Communist Party of Aragon (PCA–PCE)	3,314	2.54	–4.02	0	±0
Socialist Party of Aragon (PSAr)^{2}	2,116	1.62	+0.46	0	±0
Workers' Socialist Party (PST)	624	0.48	New	0	±0
New Force (FN)^{3}	407	0.31	–0.45	0	±0
Communist Unification of Spain (UCE)	300	0.23	New	0	±0
Communist Party of Spain (Marxist–Leninist) (PCE (m–l))	242	0.19	New	0	±0
Communist Left (LCR–MC)^{4}	0	0.00	–0.68	0	±0
Blank ballots	827	0.63	+0.24		
Total	130,487			3	±0
Valid votes	130,487	96.25	–2.19		
Invalid votes	5,080	3.75	+2.19		
Votes cast / turnout	135,567	81.25	+10.03		
Abstentions	31,285	18.75	–10.03		
Registered voters	166,852				
Sources
Footnotes: ^{1} People's Alliance–People's Democratic–Aragonese Party results are compared to Democratic Coalition totals in the 1979 election.; ^{2} Socialist Party of Aragon results are compared to Coalition for Aragon totals in the 1979 election.; ^{3} New Force results are compared to National Union totals in the 1979 election.; ^{4} Communist Left results are compared to the combined totals of Communist Movement–Organization of Communist Left and Revolutionary Communist League in the 1979 election.

=== 1979 ===
Summary of the 1 March 1979 Congress of Deputies election results in Huesca
Parties and alliances	Popular vote			Seats	
Parties and alliances	Votes	%	±pp	Total	+/−
Union of the Democratic Centre (UCD)	56,449	47.93	+2.36	2	±0
Spanish Socialist Workers' Party (PSOE)^{1}	40,885	34.71	–4.00	1	±0
Communist Party of Spain (PCE)	7,724	6.56	+0.52	0	±0
Democratic Coalition (CD)^{2}	5,280	4.48	–1.42	0	±0
Coalition for Aragon (PSAr–PSDA)	1,363	1.16	New	0	±0
Republican Left (IR)	1,308	1.11	New	0	±0
Spanish Socialist Workers' Party (historical) (PSOEh)	1,017	0.86	New	0	±0
National Union (UN)	900	0.76	New	0	±0
Party of Labour of Spain (PTE)^{3}	665	0.56	–0.22	0	±0
Communist Movement–Organization of Communist Left (MC–OIC)	629	0.53	New	0	±0
Workers' Revolutionary Organization (ORT)	263	0.22	New	0	±0
Communist Organization of Spain (Red Flag) (OCE–BR)	247	0.21	New	0	±0
Spanish Phalanx of the CNSO (Authentic) (FE–JONS(A))	247	0.21	–0.11	0	±0
Revolutionary Communist League (LCR)	177	0.15	New	0	±0
Carlist Party (PC)	166	0.14	New	0	±0
Blank ballots	462	0.39	+0.07		
Total	117,782			3	±0
Valid votes	117,782	98.44	+0.43		
Invalid votes	1,872	1.56	–0.43		
Votes cast / turnout	119,654	71.22	–10.43		
Abstentions	48,360	28.78	+10.43		
Registered voters	168,014				
Sources
Footnotes: ^{1} Spanish Socialist Workers' Party results are compared to the combined totals of Spanish Socialist Workers' Party and People's Socialist Party–Socialist Unity in the 1977 election.; ^{2} Democratic Coalition results are compared to People's Alliance totals in the 1977 election.; ^{3} Party of Labour of Spain results are compared to Democratic Left Front totals in the 1977 election.

=== 1977 ===
Summary of the 15 June 1977 Congress of Deputies election results in Huesca
Parties and alliances	Popular vote			Seats	
Parties and alliances	Votes	%	±pp	Total	+/−
Union of the Democratic Centre (UCD)	55,837	45.57	n/a	2	n/a
Spanish Socialist Workers' Party (PSOE)	33,693	27.50	n/a	1	n/a
People's Socialist Party–Socialist Unity (PSP–US)	13,730	11.21	n/a	0	n/a
Communist Party of Spain (PCE)	7,398	6.04	n/a	0	n/a
People's Alliance (AP)	7,223	5.90	n/a	0	n/a
Federation of Christian Democracy (FPD–ID)	2,895	2.36	n/a	0	n/a
Democratic Left Front (FDI)	955	0.78	n/a	0	n/a
Spanish Phalanx of the CNSO (Authentic) (FE–JONS(A))	398	0.32	n/a	0	n/a
Blank ballots	394	0.32	n/a		
Total	122,523			3	n/a
Valid votes	122,523	98.01	n/a		
Invalid votes	2,492	1.99	n/a		
Votes cast / turnout	125,015	81.65	n/a		
Abstentions	28,094	18.35	n/a		
Registered voters	153,109				

== Bibliography ==
- Ley 1/1977, de 4 de enero, para la Reforma Política (Fundamental Law 1/1977). Official State Gazette (in Spanish). 4 January 1977. BOE-A-1977-165.
- Real Decreto-ley 20/1977, de 18 de marzo, sobre Normas Electorales (Royal Decree-Law 20/1977). Official State Gazette (in Spanish). 18 March 1977. BOE-A-1977-7445.
- Constitución Española (Constitution). Official State Gazette (in Spanish). 27 December 1978. BOE-A-1978-31229.
- Ley Orgánica 5/1985, de 19 de junio, del Régimen Electoral General (Organic Law 5/1985). Official State Gazette (in Spanish). 19 June 1985. BOE-A-1985-11672.
- Carreras de Odriozola, Albert; Tafunell Sambola, Xavier (2005) [1989]. Estadísticas históricas de España, siglos XIX-XX (PDF) (in Spanish). Vol. 1 (II ed.). Bilbao: Fundación BBVA. pp. 1072–1097. ISBN 84-96515-00-1. Archived from the original (PDF) on 24 September 2015.
