= 1979 Spanish local elections in Aragon =

This article presents the results breakdown of the local elections held in Aragon on 3 April 1979. The following tables show detailed results in the autonomous community's most populous municipalities, sorted alphabetically.

== City control ==
The following table lists party control in the most populous municipalities, including provincial capitals (highlighted in bold).

| Municipality | Population | New control |
|---|---|---|
| Calatayud | 17,599 | Regionalist Aragonese Party (PAR) |
| **Huesca** | 38,095 | Union of the Democratic Centre (UCD) |
| **Teruel** | 24,590 | Union of the Democratic Centre (UCD) |
| **Zaragoza** | 555,424 | Spanish Socialist Workers' Party (PSOE) |

== Municipalities ==
=== Calatayud ===
Population: 17,599

Summary of the 3 April 1979 City Council of Calatayud election results →
| Parties and alliances | Popular vote | | | Seats | |
| Parties and alliances | Votes | % | ±pp | Total | +/− |
|---|---|---|---|---|---|
| Regionalist Aragonese Party (PAR) | 2,408 | 30.78 | n/a | 5 | n/a |
| Communist Movement–Organization of Communist Left (MC–OIC) | 1,784 | 22.81 | n/a | 4 | n/a |
| Democratic Coalition (CD) | 1,449 | 18.52 | n/a | 3 | n/a |
| Union of the Democratic Centre (UCD) | 1,317 | 16.84 | n/a | 3 | n/a |
| Spanish Socialist Workers' Party (PSOE) | 864 | 11.05 | n/a | 2 | n/a |
| Blank ballots | 0 | 0.00 | n/a | | |
| **Total** | **7,822** | | | 17 | **n/a** |
| Valid votes | 7,822 | 98.28 | n/a | | |
| Invalid votes | 137 | 1.72 | n/a | | |
| **Votes cast / turnout** | **7,959** | **61.17** | **n/a** | | |
| Abstentions | 5,052 | 38.83 | n/a | | |
| **Registered voters** | **13,011** | | | | |

=== Huesca ===
Population: 38,095

Summary of the 3 April 1979 City Council of Huesca election results →
| Parties and alliances | Popular vote | | | Seats | |
| Parties and alliances | Votes | % | ±pp | Total | +/− |
|---|---|---|---|---|---|
| Union of the Democratic Centre (UCD) | 7,334 | 42.42 | n/a | **10** | n/a |
| Spanish Socialist Workers' Party (PSOE) | 5,115 | 29.59 | n/a | **7** | n/a |
| Independent of Huesca (IdH) | 1,924 | 11.13 | n/a | **2** | n/a |
| Communist Movement of Aragon (MCA) | 1,002 | 5.80 | n/a | **1** | n/a |
| Communist Party of Spain (PCE) | 999 | 5.78 | n/a | **1** | n/a |
| Republican Left (IR) | 535 | 3.09 | n/a | 0 | n/a |
| Party of Labour of Aragon (PTA) | 380 | 2.20 | n/a | 0 | n/a |
| Blank ballots | 0 | 0.00 | n/a | | |
| **Total** | **17,289** | | | **21** | **n/a** |
| Valid votes | 17,289 | 97.88 | n/a | | |
| Invalid votes | 375 | 2.12 | n/a | | |
| **Votes cast / turnout** | **17,664** | **63.35** | **n/a** | | |
| Abstentions | 10,217 | 36.65 | n/a | | |
| **Registered voters** | **27,881** | | | | |

=== Teruel ===
Population: 24,590

Summary of the 3 April 1979 City Council of Teruel election results →
| Parties and alliances | Popular vote | | | Seats | |
| Parties and alliances | Votes | % | ±pp | Total | +/− |
|---|---|---|---|---|---|
| Union of the Democratic Centre (UCD) | 4,971 | 44.28 | n/a | **10** | n/a |
| Spanish Socialist Workers' Party (PSOE) | 2,789 | 24.84 | n/a | **5** | n/a |
| Electoral Group of Teruel (AET) | 2,504 | 22.31 | n/a | **5** | n/a |
| Communist Party of Spain (PCE) | 677 | 6.03 | n/a | **1** | n/a |
| Party of Labour of Aragon (PTA) | 183 | 1.63 | n/a | 0 | n/a |
| Communist Movement of Aragon (MCA) | 102 | 0.91 | n/a | 0 | n/a |
| Blank ballots | 0 | 0.00 | n/a | | |
| **Total** | **11,226** | | | **21** | **n/a** |
| Valid votes | 11,226 | 100.00 | n/a | | |
| Invalid votes | 0 | 0.00 | n/a | | |
| **Votes cast / turnout** | **11,226** | **62.40** | **n/a** | | |
| Abstentions | 6,763 | 37.60 | n/a | | |
| **Registered voters** | **17,989** | | | | |

=== Zaragoza ===
Population: 555,424

Summary of the 3 April 1979 City Council of Zaragoza election results →
| Parties and alliances | Popular vote | | | Seats | |
| Parties and alliances | Votes | % | ±pp | Total | +/− |
|---|---|---|---|---|---|
| Spanish Socialist Workers' Party (PSOE) | 71,967 | 30.91 | n/a | **11** | n/a |
| Union of the Democratic Centre (UCD) | 47,657 | 20.47 | n/a | **7** | n/a |
| Regionalist Aragonese Party (PAR) | 43,196 | 18.55 | n/a | **7** | n/a |
| Communist Party of Spain (PCE) | 26,517 | 11.39 | n/a | **4** | n/a |
| Party of Labour of Aragon (PTA) | 15,314 | 6.58 | n/a | **2** | n/a |
| Communist Movement–Organization of Communist Left (MC–OIC) | 9,883 | 4.24 | n/a | 0 | n/a |
| Independent Citizen Candidacy (CCI) | 6,428 | 2.76 | n/a | 0 | n/a |
| Democratic Coalition (CD) | 5,817 | 2.50 | n/a | 0 | n/a |
| Coalition for Aragon (PSAr–PSDA) | 4,623 | 1.99 | n/a | 0 | n/a |
| Republican Left (IR) | 936 | 0.40 | n/a | 0 | n/a |
| Revolutionary Communist League (LCR) | 511 | 0.22 | n/a | 0 | n/a |
| Workers' Revolutionary Organization (ORT) | 0 | 0.00 | n/a | 0 | n/a |
| Blank ballots | 0 | 0.00 | n/a | | |
| **Total** | **232,849** | | | **31** | **n/a** |
| Valid votes | 232,849 | 98.68 | n/a | | |
| Invalid votes | 3,111 | 1.32 | n/a | | |
| **Votes cast / turnout** | **235,960** | **58.56** | **n/a** | | |
| Abstentions | 166,954 | 41.44 | n/a | | |
| **Registered voters** | **402,914** | | | | |
