= Zaragoza (Congress of Deputies constituency) =

Electoral constituency in Spain

Coordinates: 41°35′N 1°00′W

- Congress of Deputies; Electoral constituency
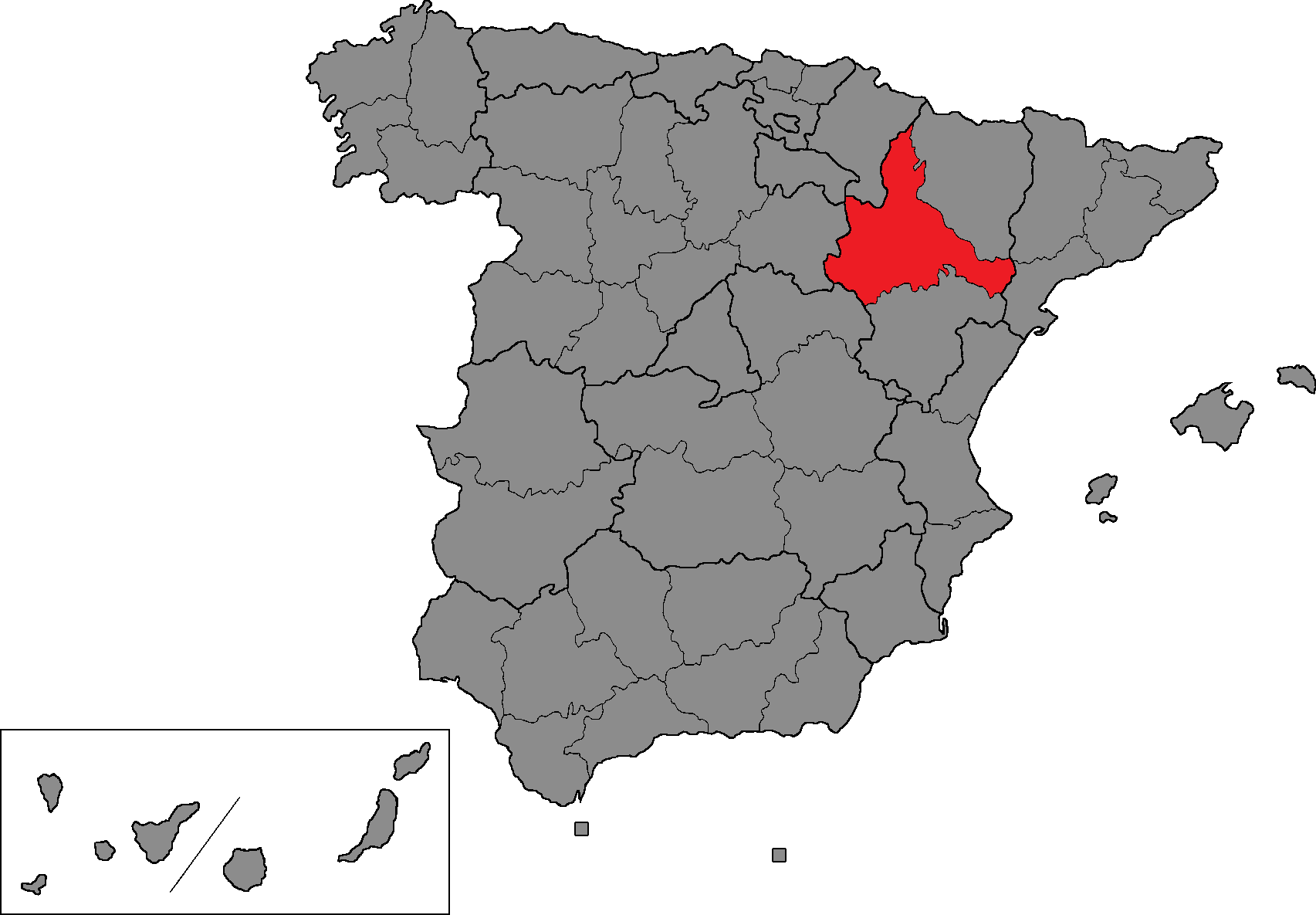
- Location of Zaragoza within Spain
- Province: Zaragoza
- Autonomous community: Aragon
- Population: ▲983,539 (2024)
- Electorate: ▲740,060 (2023)
- Major settlements: Zaragoza

Current constituency
- Created: 1977
- Seats: 8 (1977–1989); 7 (1989–present)
- Members: PP (3); PSOE (2); Vox (1); Sumar (1)

Zaragoza is one of the 52 constituencies represented in the Congress of Deputies, the lower chamber of the Spanish parliament, the Cortes Generales. The constituency (whose boundaries correspond to those of the homonymous province) currently elects seven deputies. The electoral system uses the D'Hondt method and closed-list proportional voting, with a minimum threshold of three percent.

== Electoral system ==
The constituency was created as per the Political Reform Law and was first contested in the 1977 general election. The Law provided for the provinces of Spain to be established as multi-member districts in the Congress of Deputies, with this regulation being maintained under the Spanish Constitution of 1978. Additionally, the Constitution requires for any modification of the provincial limits to be approved under an organic law, needing an absolute majority in the Cortes Generales.

Voting is based on universal suffrage, comprising all Spanish nationals over 18 years of age with full political rights, provided that they have not been deprived of the right to vote by a final sentence. The only exception was in 1977, when this was limited to nationals over 21 years of age and in full enjoyment of their political and civil rights. Amendments in 2011 required non-resident citizens to apply for voting, a system known as "begged" voting (Spanish: Voto rogado). which was abolished in 2022. Further, amendments in 2018 granted the right to vote to those legally incapacitated. The Congress of Deputies has a minimum of 300 and a maximum of 400 seats, with electoral provisions fixing its size at 350. Of these, 348 are elected in 50 multi-member constituencies corresponding to the provinces of Spain—each of which is assigned an initial minimum of two seats and the remaining 248 distributed in proportion to population—using the D'Hondt method and closed-list proportional voting, with a three percent-threshold of valid votes (including blank ballots) in each constituency. The remaining two seats are allocated to Ceuta and Melilla as single-member districts elected by plurality voting. The use of this electoral method may result in a higher effective threshold depending on district magnitude and vote distribution. The law does not provide for by-elections to fill vacant seats; instead, any vacancies arising after the proclamation of candidates and during the legislative term are filled by the next candidates on the party lists or, when required, by designated substitutes.

The electoral law allows for parties and federations registered in the interior ministry, alliances and groupings of electors to present lists of candidates. Parties and federations intending to form an alliance are required to inform the relevant electoral commission within 10 days of the election call—15 before 1985—whereas groupings of electors need to secure the signature of at least one percent of the electorate in the constituencies for which they seek election—one permille of the electorate, with a compulsory minimum of 500 signatures, until 1985—disallowing electors from signing for more than one list. Also since 2011, parties, federations or alliances that have not obtained a mandate in either chamber of the Cortes at the preceding election are required to secure the signature of at least 0.1 percent of electors in the aforementioned constituencies. Amendments in 2007 required a balanced composition of men and women in the electoral lists, so that candidates of either sex made up at least 40 percent of the total composition; further amendments in 2024 required the use of a zipper system.

== Deputies ==
Deputies 1977–present
Key to parties IU CHA U.Podemos Podemos Sumar PSP PSOE CDS CAIC/PAR Cs UCD PP CP AP Vox
Legislature	Election	Distribution
Constituent	1977	1 / 3 / 1 / 3
1st	1979	3 / 1 / 4
2nd	1982	5 / 3
3rd	1986	4 / 1 / 1 / 2
4th	1989	1 / 3 / 1 / 2
5th	1993	1 / 3 / 1 / 2
6th	1996	3 / 4
7th	2000	1 / 2 / 4
8th	2004	1 / 3 / 3
9th	2008	4 / 3
10th	2011	1 / 2 / 4
11th	2015	1 / 2 / 1 / 3
12th	2016	1 / 2 / 1 / 3
13th	2019 (Apr)	1 / 3 / 1 / 1 / 1
14th	2019 (Nov)	1 / 3 / 2 / 1
15th	2023	1 / 2 / 3 / 1

== General elections ==
=== 2026 ===
Summary of the 29 November 2026 Congress of Deputies election results in Zaragoza
Parties and alliances	Popular vote			Seats	
Parties and alliances	Votes	%	±pp	Total	+/−
People's Party (PP)					
Spanish Socialist Workers' Party (PSOE)					
Vox (Vox)					
Aragonese Union–Broad Front Aragon (CHA–IU–MS–Frente Amplio)^{1}			n/a		
We Can (Podemos)^{1}			n/a		
Workers' Front (FO)					
Communist Party of the Workers of Spain (PCTE)					
For a Fairer World (M+J)					
Federation of Independents of Aragon (FIA)					
The Party is Over (SALF)			New		
Blank ballots					
Total				7	±0
Valid votes					
Invalid votes					
Votes cast / turnout					
Abstentions					
Registered voters	760,968				
Sources
Footnotes: ^{1} Within the Unite Aragon alliance in the 2023 election.

=== 2023 ===
Summary of the 23 July 2023 Congress of Deputies election results in Zaragoza
Parties and alliances	Popular vote			Seats	
Parties and alliances	Votes	%	±pp	Total	+/−
People's Party (PP)	186,776	36.01	+12.65	3	+1
Spanish Socialist Workers' Party (PSOE)	159,858	30.82	-0.03	2	–1
Vox (Vox)	79,376	15.30	–2.69	1	±0
Unite Aragon (Sumar Aragón)^{1}	69,925	13.48	–2.32	1	±0
Aragon Exists–Exists Coalition (Existe)	7,780	1.50	New	0	±0
Aragonese Party (PAR)	2,745	0.53	New	0	±0
Animalist Party with the Environment (PACMA)^{2}	2,428	0.47	–0.23	0	±0
Blank Seats to Leave Empty Seats (EB)	2,146	0.41	+0.03	0	±0
Workers' Front (FO)	1,026	0.20	New	0	±0
Communist Party of the Workers of Spain (PCTE)	561	0.11	+0.03	0	±0
For a Fairer World (PUM+J)	419	0.08	–0.01	0	±0
Federation of Independents of Aragon (FIA)	394	0.08	±0.00	0	±0
Zero Cuts (Recortes Cero)	306	0.06	–0.11	0	±0
Spanish Phalanx of the CNSO (FE de las JONS)	272	0.05	New	0	±0
Blank ballots	4,693	0.90	–0.07		
Total	518,705			7	±0
Valid votes	518,705	99.10	-0.06		
Invalid votes	4,705	0.90	+0.06		
Votes cast / turnout	523,410	70.73	+0.74		
Abstentions	216,650	29.27	–0.74		
Registered voters	740,060				
Sources
Footnotes: ^{1} Unite Aragon results are compared to the combined totals of United We Can and More Country–Aragonese Union–Equo in the November 2019 election.; ^{2} Animalist Party with the Environment results are compared to Animalist Party Against Mistreatment of Animals totals in the November 2019 election.

=== November 2019 ===
Summary of the 10 November 2019 Congress of Deputies election results in Zaragoza
Parties and alliances	Popular vote			Seats	
Parties and alliances	Votes	%	±pp	Total	+/−
Spanish Socialist Workers' Party (PSOE)	158,326	30.85	–0.45	3	±0
People's Party (PP)	119,909	23.36	+5.41	2	+1
Vox (Vox)	92,353	17.99	+5.24	1	±0
United We Can (Podemos–IU)	57,875	11.28	–2.71	1	±0
Citizens–Party of the Citizenry (Cs)	47,001	9.16	–11.70	0	–1
More Country–Aragonese Union–Equo (Más País–CHA–Equo)	23,196	4.52	New	0	±0
Animalist Party Against Mistreatment of Animals (PACMA)	3,618	0.70	–0.29	0	±0
Blank Seats (EB)	1,940	0.38	–0.09	0	±0
Social Aragonese Movement (MAS)	1,068	0.21	New	0	±0
Zero Cuts–Green Group (Recortes Cero–GV)	861	0.17	–0.09	0	±0
Puyalón (PYLN)	532	0.10	–0.01	0	±0
For a Fairer World (PUM+J)	485	0.09	–0.05	0	±0
Communist Party of the Workers of Spain (PCTE)	414	0.08	–0.03	0	±0
Federation of Independents of Aragon (FIA)	386	0.08	–0.04	0	±0
Communist Party of the Peoples of Spain (PCPE)	331	0.06	–0.02	0	±0
Blank ballots	4,989	0.97	+0.09		
Total	513,284			7	±0
Valid votes	513,284	99.16	+0.13		
Invalid votes	4,355	0.84	–0.13		
Votes cast / turnout	517,639	69.99	–5.85		
Abstentions	221,934	30.01	+5.85		
Registered voters	739,573				

=== April 2019 ===
Summary of the 28 April 2019 Congress of Deputies election results in Zaragoza
Parties and alliances	Popular vote			Seats	
Parties and alliances	Votes	%	±pp	Total	+/−
Spanish Socialist Workers' Party (PSOE)	173,557	31.30	+6.88	3	+1
Citizens–Party of the Citizenry (Cs)	115,651	20.86	+4.02	1	±0
People's Party (PP)	99,527	17.95	–16.97	1	–2
United We Can (Podemos–IU–Equo)	77,555	13.99	–6.32	1	±0
Vox (Vox)	70,663	12.75	+12.44	1	+1
Animalist Party Against Mistreatment of Animals (PACMA)	5,469	0.99	+0.01	0	±0
Blank Seats (EB)	2,626	0.47	–0.12	0	±0
Zero Cuts–Green Group (Recortes Cero–GV)	1,428	0.26	+0.04	0	±0
For a Fairer World (PUM+J)	749	0.14	New	0	±0
Federation of Independents of Aragon (FIA)	658	0.12	+0.02	0	±0
Puyalón (PYLN)	621	0.11	New	0	±0
Communist Party of the Workers of Spain (PCTE)	589	0.11	New	0	±0
Communist Party of the Peoples of Spain (PCPE)	453	0.08	–0.03	0	±0
Blank ballots	4,861	0.88	+0.08		
Total	554,407			7	±0
Valid votes	554,407	99.03	–0.19		
Invalid votes	5,452	0.97	+0.19		
Votes cast / turnout	559,859	75.84	+5.39		
Abstentions	178,372	24.16	–5.39		
Registered voters	738,231				

=== 2016 ===
Summary of the 26 June 2016 Congress of Deputies election results in Zaragoza
Parties and alliances	Popular vote			Seats	
Parties and alliances	Votes	%	±pp	Total	+/−
People's Party–Aragonese Party (PP–PAR)	179,211	34.92	+4.63	3	±0
Spanish Socialist Workers' Party (PSOE)	125,321	24.42	+2.14	2	±0
United We Can in Aragon (Podemos–IU–Equo)^{1}	104,199	20.31	–5.44	1	±0
Citizens–Party of the Citizenry (C's)	86,434	16.84	–0.98	1	±0
Animalist Party Against Mistreatment of Animals (PACMA)	5,025	0.98	+0.22	0	±0
Blank Seats (EB)	3,032	0.59	+0.03	0	±0
Vox (Vox)	1,614	0.31	–0.04	0	±0
Union, Progress and Democracy (UPyD)	1,395	0.27	–0.58	0	±0
Zero Cuts–Green Group (Recortes Cero–GV)	1,137	0.22	+0.02	0	±0
Social Aragonese Movement (MAS)	568	0.11	New	0	±0
Communist Party of the Peoples of Spain (PCPE)	564	0.11	–0.05	0	±0
Independents for Aragon (i)	511	0.10	–0.01	0	±0
Blank ballots	4,124	0.80	–0.07		
Total	513,135			7	±0
Valid votes	513,135	99.22	–0.06		
Invalid votes	4,009	0.78	+0.06		
Votes cast / turnout	517,144	70.45	–2.69		
Abstentions	216,920	29.55	+2.69		
Registered voters	734,064				
Sources
Footnotes: ^{1} United We Can results are compared to the combined totals of We Can and United Left–Aragonese Union–Popular Unity in Common in the 2015 election.

=== 2015 ===
Summary of the 20 December 2015 Congress of Deputies election results in Zaragoza
Parties and alliances	Popular vote			Seats	
Parties and alliances	Votes	%	±pp	Total	+/−
People's Party–Aragonese Party (PP–PAR)	161,662	30.29	–16.62	3	–1
Spanish Socialist Workers' Party (PSOE)	118,936	22.28	–8.50	2	±0
We Can (Podemos)	102,596	19.22	New	1	+1
Citizens–Party of the Citizenry (C's)	95,130	17.82	New	1	+1
United Left–Aragonese Union–Popular Unity in Common (IU–CHA–UPeC)	34,869	6.53	–4.93	0	–1
Union, Progress and Democracy (UPyD)	4,514	0.85	–5.57	0	±0
Animalist Party Against Mistreatment of Animals (PACMA)	4,057	0.76	+0.26	0	±0
Blank Seats (EB)	2,967	0.56	+0.05	0	±0
Vox (Vox)	1,849	0.35	New	0	±0
Zero Cuts–Green Group (Recortes Cero–GV)	1,088	0.20	New	0	±0
Communist Party of the Peoples of Spain (PCPE)	845	0.16	–0.05	0	±0
Independents for Aragon (i)	562	0.11	New	0	±0
Blank ballots	4,657	0.87	–1.07		
Total	533,732			7	±0
Valid votes	533,732	99.28	+0.73		
Invalid votes	3,894	0.72	–0.73		
Votes cast / turnout	537,626	73.14	+1.76		
Abstentions	197,453	26.86	–1.76		
Registered voters	735,079				

=== 2011 ===
Summary of the 20 November 2011 Congress of Deputies election results in Zaragoza
Parties and alliances	Popular vote			Seats	
Parties and alliances	Votes	%	±pp	Total	+/−
People's Party–Aragonese Party (PP–PAR)^{1}	241,074	46.91	+5.72	4	+1
Spanish Socialist Workers' Party (PSOE)	158,167	30.78	–15.62	2	–2
Aragonese Union–United Left: Plural Left (CHA–IU)^{2}	58,904	11.46	+2.70	1	+1
Union, Progress and Democracy (UPyD)	32,968	6.42	+5.21	0	±0
Equo (Equo)	3,858	0.75	New	0	±0
Blank Seats (EB)	2,640	0.51	New	0	±0
Animalist Party Against Mistreatment of Animals (PACMA)	2,586	0.50	+0.33	0	±0
Communist Party of the Peoples of Spain (PCPE)	1,055	0.21	+0.17	0	±0
For a Fairer World (PUM+J)	939	0.18	+0.11	0	±0
Let us Give the Change (DeC)	508	0.10	New	0	±0
Humanist Party (PH)	463	0.09	+0.07	0	±0
Individual Freedom Party (P–LIB)	410	0.08	New	0	±0
Communist Unification of Spain (UCE)	370	0.07	New	0	±0
Blank ballots	9,951	1.94	+0.68		
Total	513,893			7	±0
Valid votes	513,893	98.55	–0.96		
Invalid votes	7,562	1.45	+0.96		
Votes cast / turnout	521,455	71.38	–4.54		
Abstentions	209,041	28.62	+4.54		
Registered voters	730,496				
Sources
Footnotes: ^{1} People's Party–Aragonese Party results are compared to the combined totals of the People's Party and Aragonese Party in the 2008 election.; ^{2} Aragonese Union–United Left: Plural Left results are compared to the combined totals of Aragonese Union and United Left in the 2008 election.

=== 2008 ===
Summary of the 9 March 2008 Congress of Deputies election results in Zaragoza
Parties and alliances	Popular vote			Seats	
Parties and alliances	Votes	%	±pp	Total	+/−
Spanish Socialist Workers' Party (PSOE)	254,479	46.40	+6.14	4	+1
People's Party (PP)	199,934	36.46	+0.91	3	±0
Aragonese Union (CHA)	32,281	5.89	–8.65	0	–1
Aragonese Party (PAR)	25,949	4.73	+0.65	0	±0
United Left (IU)	15,731	2.87	+0.06	0	±0
Union, Progress and Democracy (UPyD)	6,621	1.21	New	0	±0
The Greens–Green Group (LV–GV)	1,758	0.32	New	0	±0
Anti-Bullfighting Party Against Mistreatment of Animals (PACMA)	958	0.17	New	0	±0
Citizens–Party of the Citizenry (C's)	755	0.14	New	0	±0
Aragon United Citizens Party (pCUA)	380	0.07	New	0	±0
Citizens for Blank Votes (CenB)	376	0.07	–0.07	0	±0
For a Fairer World (PUM+J)	372	0.07	New	0	±0
National Democracy (DN)	323	0.06	±0	0	±0
Social Democratic Party–Federation of Independents of Aragon (PSD–FIA)	286	0.05	New	0	±0
Family and Life Party (PFyV)	262	0.05	–0.06	0	±0
Spanish Phalanx of the CNSO (FE de las JONS)	236	0.04	±0.00	0	±0
Communist Party of the Peoples of Spain (PCPE)	200	0.04	±0.00	0	±0
Authentic Phalanx (FA)	135	0.02	±0.00	0	±0
National Alliance (AN)	133	0.02	New	0	±0
Spanish Front (Frente)	113	0.02	New	0	±0
Humanist Party (PH)	91	0.02	–0.03	0	±0
Spanish Alternative (AES)	76	0.01	New	0	±0
Spain 2000 (E–2000)	73	0.01	New	0	±0
Blank ballots	6,917	1.26	–0.84		
Total	548,439			7	±0
Valid votes	548,439	99.51	+0.07		
Invalid votes	2,710	0.49	–0.07		
Votes cast / turnout	551,149	75.92	–1.33		
Abstentions	174,794	24.08	+1.33		
Registered voters	725,943				

=== 2004 ===
Summary of the 14 March 2004 Congress of Deputies election results in Zaragoza
Parties and alliances	Popular vote			Seats	
Parties and alliances	Votes	%	±pp	Total	+/−
Spanish Socialist Workers' Party (PSOE)	224,776	40.26	+11.09	3	+1
People's Party (PP)	198,480	35.55	–12.08	3	–1
Aragonese Union (CHA)	81,160	14.54	+1.76	1	±0
Aragonese Party (PAR)	22,758	4.08	–0.28	0	±0
United Left–The Greens (IU–LV)	15,672	2.81	–0.90	0	±0
Citizens for Blank Votes (CenB)	789	0.14	New	0	±0
Family and Life Party (PFyV)	598	0.11	New	0	±0
Democratic and Social Centre (CDS)	577	0.10	+0.06	0	±0
National Democracy (DN)	326	0.06	New	0	±0
Republican Left (IR)	257	0.05	New	0	±0
Humanist Party (PH)	254	0.05	+0.01	0	±0
Communist Party of the Peoples of Spain (PCPE)	248	0.04	New	0	±0
Spanish Phalanx of the CNSO (FE de las JONS)^{1}	208	0.04	±0.00	0	±0
The Phalanx (FE)	195	0.03	–0.02	0	±0
Authentic Phalanx (FA)	136	0.02	New	0	±0
Carlist Party (PC)	99	0.02	New	0	±0
Republican Social Movement (MSR)	96	0.02	New	0	±0
Blank ballots	11,703	2.10	+0.71		
Total	558,332			7	±0
Valid votes	558,332	99.44	+0.01		
Invalid votes	3,118	0.56	–0.01		
Votes cast / turnout	561,450	77.25	+5.84		
Abstentions	165,361	22.75	–5.84		
Registered voters	726,811				
Sources
Footnotes: ^{1} Spanish Phalanx of the CNSO results are compared to Independent Spanish Phalanx–Phalanx 2000 totals in the 2000 election.

=== 2000 ===
Summary of the 12 March 2000 Congress of Deputies election results in Zaragoza
Parties and alliances	Popular vote			Seats	
Parties and alliances	Votes	%	±pp	Total	+/−
People's Party (PP)	244,403	47.63	–0.64	4	±0
Spanish Socialist Workers' Party–Progressives (PSOE–p)	149,672	29.17	–2.77	2	–1
Aragonese Union (CHA)	65,599	12.78	+4.83	1	+1
Aragonese Party (PAR)	22,382	4.36	New	0	±0
United Left of Aragon (IU)	19,059	3.71	–6.36	0	±0
The Greens–Green Group–SOS Nature (LV–GV)	2,638	0.51	+0.14	0	±0
Aragonese Initiative (INAR)	855	0.17	New	0	±0
The Phalanx (FE)	293	0.05	New	0	±0
Humanist Party (PH)	226	0.04	–0.01	0	±0
Centrist Union–Democratic and Social Centre (UC–CDS)	194	0.04	New	0	±0
Independent Spanish Phalanx–Phalanx 2000 (FEI–FE 2000)	192	0.04	New	0	±0
Spain 2000 Platform (ES2000)	173	0.03	New	0	±0
Natural Law Party (PLN)	161	0.03	New	0	±0
Spanish Democratic Party (PADE)	93	0.02	New	0	±0
Catalan State (EC)	81	0.02	New	0	±0
Blank ballots	7,138	1.39	+0.25		
Total	513,159			7	±0
Valid votes	513,159	99.43	–0.13		
Invalid votes	2,934	0.57	+0.13		
Votes cast / turnout	516,093	71.41	–6.06		
Abstentions	206,576	28.59	+6.06		
Registered voters	722,669				

=== 1996 ===
Summary of the 3 March 1996 Congress of Deputies election results in Zaragoza
Parties and alliances	Popular vote			Seats	
Parties and alliances	Votes	%	±pp	Total	+/−
People's Party–Aragonese Party (PP–PAR)^{1}	263,868	48.27	–4.12	4	+1
Spanish Socialist Workers' Party (PSOE)	174,567	31.94	–0.46	3	±0
United Left of Aragon (IU)	55,019	10.07	–1.11	0	–1
Aragonese Union (CHA)	43,477	7.95	+7.08	0	±0
SOS Nature (SOS)	2,026	0.37	New	0	±0
Workers' Revolutionary Party (PRT)^{2}	449	0.08	–0.23	0	±0
Authentic Spanish Phalanx (FEA)	407	0.07	New	0	±0
Humanist Party (PH)	299	0.05	+0.03	0	±0
Aragonese Social Dynamics (DSA)	265	0.05	New	0	±0
Blank ballots	6,221	1.14	+0.42		
Total	546,598			7	±0
Valid votes	546,598	99.56	+0.12		
Invalid votes	2,433	0.44	–0.12		
Votes cast / turnout	549,031	77.47	–1.28		
Abstentions	159,701	22.53	+1.28		
Registered voters	708,732				
Sources
Footnotes: ^{1} People's Party–Aragonese Party results are compared to the combined totals of the People's Party and the Aragonese Party in the 1993 election.; ^{2} Workers' Revolutionary Party results are compared to Workers' Socialist Party totals in the 1993 election.

=== 1993 ===
Summary of the 6 June 1993 Congress of Deputies election results in Zaragoza
Parties and alliances	Popular vote			Seats	
Parties and alliances	Votes	%	±pp	Total	+/−
Spanish Socialist Workers' Party (PSOE)	174,061	32.40	–5.63	3	±0
People's Party (PP)	172,753	32.16	+4.70	2	±0
Aragonese Party (PAR)	108,690	20.23	+9.62	1	±0
United Left of Aragon (IU)	60,074	11.18	–0.08	1	±0
Democratic and Social Centre (CDS)	5,765	1.07	–6.10	0	±0
Aragonese Union (CHA)	4,650	0.87	+0.42	0	±0
The Greens (Verdes)^{1}	2,615	0.49	–0.10	0	±0
Workers' Socialist Party (PST)	1,692	0.31	–0.30	0	±0
Ruiz-Mateos Group–Independent Party–Social Movement (ARM–PAI–MAS)	954	0.18	–0.98	0	±0
The Ecologists (LE)	740	0.14	–0.51	0	±0
Health and Ecology in Solidarity (SEES)	418	0.08	New	0	±0
Federated Independents of Aragon (IF)	303	0.06	New	0	±0
Revolutionary Workers' Party (POR)	257	0.05	New	0	±0
Natural Law Party (PLN)	135	0.03	New	0	±0
Humanist Party (PH)	132	0.02	–0.06	0	±0
Coalition for a New Socialist Party (CNPS)^{2}	115	0.02	–0.05	0	±0
Communist Unification of Spain (UCE)	0	0.00	New	0	±0
Blank ballots	3,883	0.72	–0.14		
Total	537,237			7	±0
Valid votes	537,237	99.44	+0.07		
Invalid votes	3,033	0.56	–0.07		
Votes cast / turnout	540,270	78.75	+8.66		
Abstentions	145,777	21.25	–8.66		
Registered voters	686,047				
Sources
Footnotes: ^{1} The Greens results are compared to The Greens–Green List totals in the 1989 election.; ^{2} Coalition for a New Socialist Party results are compared to Alliance for the Republic totals in the 1989 election.

=== 1989 ===
Summary of the 29 October 1989 Congress of Deputies election results in Zaragoza
Parties and alliances	Popular vote			Seats	
Parties and alliances	Votes	%	±pp	Total	+/−
Spanish Socialist Workers' Party (PSOE)	174,107	38.03	–5.56	3	–1
People's Party (PP)^{1}	125,728	27.46	+2.31	2	±0
United Left (IU)	51,546	11.26	+7.49	1	+1
Regionalist Aragonese Party (PAR)	48,579	10.61	–1.00	1	±0
Democratic and Social Centre (CDS)	32,826	7.17	–3.70	0	–1
Ruiz-Mateos Group (Ruiz-Mateos)	5,317	1.16	New	0	±0
The Ecologist Greens (LVE)	2,965	0.65	New	0	±0
Workers' Socialist Party (PST)	2,773	0.61	+0.16	0	±0
The Greens–Green List (LV–LV)	2,683	0.59	New	0	±0
Workers' Party of Spain–Communist Unity (PTE–UC)^{2}	2,112	0.46	–1.02	0	±0
Aragonese Union (UA–CHA)	2,078	0.45	New	0	±0
Social Democratic Coalition (CSD)	1,437	0.31	New	0	±0
Communist Party of the Peoples of Spain (PCPE)	573	0.13	New	0	±0
Spanish Phalanx of the CNSO (FE–JONS)	510	0.11	–0.11	0	±0
Humanist Party (PH)	361	0.08	New	0	±0
Alliance for the Republic (AxR)^{3}	315	0.07	–0.07	0	±0
Communist Party of Spain (Marxist–Leninist) (PCE (m–l))^{4}	0	0.00	–0.14	0	±0
Blank ballots	3,952	0.86	+0.06		
Total	457,862			7	–1
Valid votes	457,862	99.37	+1.49		
Invalid votes	2,897	0.63	–1.49		
Votes cast / turnout	460,759	70.09	–0.65		
Abstentions	196,608	29.91	+0.65		
Registered voters	657,367				
Sources
Footnotes: ^{1} People's Party results are compared to People's Coalition totals in the 1986 election.; ^{2} Workers' Party of Spain–Communist Unity results are compared to Communists' Unity Board totals in the 1986 election.; ^{3} Alliance for the Republic results are compared to Internationalist Socialist Workers' Party totals in the 1986 election.; ^{4} Communist Party of Spain (Marxist–Leninist) results are compared to Republican Popular Unity totals in the 1986 election.

=== 1986 ===
Summary of the 22 June 1986 Congress of Deputies election results in Zaragoza
Parties and alliances	Popular vote			Seats	
Parties and alliances	Votes	%	±pp	Total	+/−
Spanish Socialist Workers' Party (PSOE)	198,260	43.59	–7.70	4	–1
People's Coalition (AP–PDP–PL)^{1}	114,389	25.15	–6.34	2	–1
Regionalist Aragonese Party (PAR)	52,813	11.61	New	1	+1
Democratic and Social Centre (CDS)	49,425	10.87	+6.87	1	+1
United Left (IU)^{2}	17,147	3.77	+0.46	0	±0
Communists' Unity Board (MUC)	6,726	1.48	New	0	±0
Democratic Reformist Party (PRD)	4,500	0.99	New	0	±0
Spanish Vertex Ecological Development Revindication (VERDE)	2,570	0.57	New	0	±0
Workers' Socialist Party (PST)	2,052	0.45	–0.14	0	±0
Spanish Phalanx of the CNSO (FE–JONS)	1,023	0.22	+0.22	0	±0
Communist Unification of Spain (UCE)	1,021	0.22	+0.12	0	±0
Internationalist Socialist Workers' Party (POSI)	636	0.14	New	0	±0
Republican Popular Unity (UPR)^{3}	623	0.14	+0.05	0	±0
Party of the Communists of Catalonia (PCC)	0	0.00	New	0	±0
Blank ballots	3,616	0.80	+0.12		
Total	454,801			8	±0
Valid votes	454,801	97.88	+0.89		
Invalid votes	9,859	2.12	–0.89		
Votes cast / turnout	464,660	70.74	–12.46		
Abstentions	192,182	29.26	+12.46		
Registered voters	656,842				
Sources
Footnotes: ^{1} People's Coalition results are compared to People's Alliance–People's Democratic–Aragonese Party totals in the 1982 election.; ^{2} United Left results are compared to Communist Party of Aragon totals in the 1982 election.; ^{3} Republican Popular Unity results are compared to Communist Party of Spain (Marxist–Leninist) totals in the 1982 election.

=== 1982 ===
Summary of the 28 October 1982 Congress of Deputies election results in Zaragoza
Parties and alliances	Popular vote			Seats	
Parties and alliances	Votes	%	±pp	Total	+/−
Spanish Socialist Workers' Party (PSOE)	255,402	51.29	+24.54	5	+2
People's Alliance–People's Democratic–Aragonese Party (AP–PDP–PAR)^{1}	156,800	31.49	+17.12	3	+2
Union of the Democratic Centre (UCD)	34,044	6.84	–29.29	0	–4
Democratic and Social Centre (CDS)	19,918	4.00	New	0	±0
Communist Party of Aragon (PCA–PCE)	16,492	3.31	–4.70	0	±0
Socialist Party of Aragon (PSAr)^{2}	4,119	0.83	–3.23	0	±0
Workers' Socialist Party (PST)	2,952	0.59	New	0	±0
New Force (FN)^{3}	2,654	0.53	–1.32	0	±0
Spanish Solidarity (SE)	667	0.13	New	0	±0
Communist Unity Candidacy (CUC)^{4}	665	0.13	–0.20	0	±0
Communist Unification of Spain (UCE)	497	0.10	New	0	±0
Communist Party of Spain (Marxist–Leninist) (PCE (m–l))	469	0.09	New	0	±0
Communist League–Internationalist Socialist Workers' Coalition (LC (COSI))	47	0.01	New	0	±0
Communist Left (LCR–MC)^{5}	0	0.00	–0.84	0	±0
Spanish Phalanx of the CNSO (FE–JONS)	0	0.00	New	0	±0
Blank ballots	3,276	0.66	+0.28		
Total	498,002			8	±0
Valid votes	498,002	96.99	–1.41		
Invalid votes	15,448	3.01	+1.41		
Votes cast / turnout	513,450	83.20	+12.36		
Abstentions	103,680	16.80	–12.36		
Registered voters	617,130				
Sources
Footnotes: ^{1} People's Alliance–People's Democratic–Aragonese Party results are compared to the combined totals of Democratic Coalition and Regionalist Aragonese Party in the 1979 election.; ^{2} Socialist Party of Aragon results are compared to Coalition for Aragon totals in the 1979 election.; ^{3} New Force results are compared to National Union totals in the 1979 election.; ^{4} Communist Unity Candidacy results are compared to Workers' Communist Party totals in the 1979 election.; ^{5} Communist Left results are compared to the combined totals of Communist Movement–Organization of Communist Left and Revolutionary Communist League in the 1979 election.

=== 1979 ===
Summary of the 1 March 1979 Congress of Deputies election results in Zaragoza
Parties and alliances	Popular vote			Seats	
Parties and alliances	Votes	%	±pp	Total	+/−
Union of the Democratic Centre (UCD)	153,457	36.13	+4.36	4	+1
Spanish Socialist Workers' Party (PSOE)^{1}	113,600	26.75	–9.47	3	–1
Regionalist Aragonese Party (PAR)^{2}	38,042	8.96	+0.44	1	±0
Communist Party of Spain (PCE)	34,000	8.01	+2.86	0	±0
Democratic Coalition (CD)^{3}	22,969	5.41	–2.58	0	±0
Party of Labour of Spain (PTE)^{4}	19,883	4.68	+2.70	0	±0
Coalition for Aragon (PSAr–PSDA)	17,242	4.06	New	0	±0
National Union (UN)^{5}	7,843	1.85	+1.31	0	±0
Spanish Socialist Workers' Party (historical) (PSOEh)	4,022	0.95	–1.88	0	±0
Communist Movement–Organization of Communist Left (MC–OIC)^{6}	2,780	0.65	–0.45	0	±0
Workers' Revolutionary Organization (ORT)^{7}	2,432	0.57	+0.18	0	±0
Republican Left (IR)	2,086	0.49	New	0	±0
Workers' Communist Party (PCT)	1,416	0.33	New	0	±0
Spanish Phalanx of the CNSO (Authentic) (FE–JONS(A))	908	0.21	–0.14	0	±0
Carlist Party (PC)	872	0.21	New	0	±0
Revolutionary Communist League (LCR)	788	0.19	New	0	±0
Communist Organization of Spain (Red Flag) (OCE–BR)	756	0.18	New	0	±0
Blank ballots	1,635	0.38	+0.02		
Total	424,731			8	±0
Valid votes	424,731	98.40	–0.07		
Invalid votes	6,926	1.60	+0.07		
Votes cast / turnout	431,657	70.84	–10.09		
Abstentions	177,649	29.16	+10.09		
Registered voters	609,306				
Sources
Footnotes: ^{1} Spanish Socialist Workers' Party results are compared to the combined totals of Spanish Socialist Workers' Party and People's Socialist Party–Socialist Unity in the 1977 election.; ^{2} Regionalist Aragonese Party results are compared to Centre Independent Aragonese Candidacy totals in the 1977 election.; ^{3} Democratic Coalition results are compared to People's Alliance totals in the 1977 election.; ^{4} Party of Labour of Spain results are compared to Democratic Left Front totals in the 1977 election.; ^{5} National Union results are compared to the combined totals of National Alliance July 18 and José Antonio Circles in the 1977 election.; ^{6} Communist Movement–Organization of Communist Left results are compared to Aragonese Autonomist Front totals in the 1977 election.; ^{7} Workers' Revolutionary Organization results are compared to Workers' Electoral Group totals in the 1977 election.

=== 1977 ===
Summary of the 15 June 1977 Congress of Deputies election results in Zaragoza
Parties and alliances	Popular vote			Seats	
Parties and alliances	Votes	%	±pp	Total	+/−
Union of the Democratic Centre (UCD)	138,575	31.77	n/a	3	n/a
Spanish Socialist Workers' Party (PSOE)	111,293	25.51	n/a	3	n/a
People's Socialist Party–Socialist Unity (PSP–US)	46,737	10.71	n/a	1	n/a
Centre Independent Aragonese Candidacy (CAIC)	37,183	8.52	n/a	1	n/a
People's Alliance (AP)	34,857	7.99	n/a	0	n/a
Communist Party of Spain (PCE)	22,446	5.15	n/a	0	n/a
Spanish Socialist Workers' Party (historical) (PSOEh)	12,328	2.83	n/a	0	n/a
Democratic Left Front (FDI)	8,656	1.98	n/a	0	n/a
Federation of Christian Democracy (FPD–ID)	6,205	1.42	n/a	0	n/a
Aragonese Christian Democracy (DCAR)	6,014	1.38	n/a	0	n/a
Aragonese Autonomist Front (FAA)	4,791	1.10	n/a	0	n/a
Workers' Electoral Group (AET)	1,713	0.39	n/a	0	n/a
National Alliance July 18 (AN18)	1,602	0.37	n/a	0	n/a
Spanish Phalanx of the CNSO (Authentic) (FE–JONS(A))	1,531	0.35	n/a	0	n/a
José Antonio Circles (CJA)	729	0.17	n/a	0	n/a
Blank ballots	1,578	0.36	n/a		
Total	436,238			8	n/a
Valid votes	436,238	98.47	n/a		
Invalid votes	6,758	1.53	n/a		
Votes cast / turnout	442,996	80.93	n/a		
Abstentions	104,400	19.07	n/a		
Registered voters	547,396				

== Bibliography ==
- Ley 1/1977, de 4 de enero, para la Reforma Política (Fundamental Law 1/1977). Official State Gazette (in Spanish). 4 January 1977. BOE-A-1977-165.
- Real Decreto-ley 20/1977, de 18 de marzo, sobre Normas Electorales (Royal Decree-Law 20/1977). Official State Gazette (in Spanish). 18 March 1977. BOE-A-1977-7445.
- Constitución Española (Constitution). Official State Gazette (in Spanish). 27 December 1978. BOE-A-1978-31229.
- Ley Orgánica 5/1985, de 19 de junio, del Régimen Electoral General (Organic Law 5/1985). Official State Gazette (in Spanish). 19 June 1985. BOE-A-1985-11672.
- Carreras de Odriozola, Albert; Tafunell Sambola, Xavier (2005) [1989]. Estadísticas históricas de España, siglos XIX-XX (PDF) (in Spanish). Vol. 1 (II ed.). Bilbao: Fundación BBVA. pp. 1072–1097. ISBN 84-96515-00-1. Archived from the original (PDF) on 24 September 2015.
