= 1983 Spanish local elections in Aragon =

This article presents the results breakdown of the local elections held in Aragon on 8 May 1983. The following tables show detailed results in the autonomous community's most populous municipalities, sorted alphabetically.

== City control ==
The following table lists party control in the most populous municipalities, including provincial capitals (highlighted in bold). Gains for a party are highlighted in that party's colour.

Municipality	Population	Previous control	New control
Calatayud	17,666	Regionalist Aragonese Party (PAR)	Regionalist Aragonese Party (PAR)
**Huesca**	41,455	Union of the Democratic Centre (UCD)	Spanish Socialist Workers' Party (PSOE)
**Teruel**	25,935	Union of the Democratic Centre (UCD)	Free Independents (IL) (PAR in 1986)
**Zaragoza**	571,855	Spanish Socialist Workers' Party (PSOE)	Spanish Socialist Workers' Party (PSOE)

== Municipalities ==
=== Calatayud ===
Population: 17,666

← Summary of the 8 May 1983 City Council of Calatayud election results →
Parties and alliances	Popular vote			Seats	
Parties and alliances	Votes	%	±pp	Total	+/−
Spanish Socialist Workers' Party (PSOE)	3,240	37.73	+26.68	**7**	+5
Regionalist Aragonese Party (PAR)	2,921	34.02	+3.24	**7**	+2
People's Coalition (AP–PDP–UL)^{1}	1,147	13.36	−5.16	**2**	−1
United Left of Aragon (MCA–LCR)^{2}	656	7.64	−15.17	**1**	−3
Democratic and Social Centre (CDS)	312	3.63	New	0	±0
Independents (INDEP)	311	3.62	New	0	±0
Union of the Democratic Centre (UCD)	n/a	n/a	−16.84	0	−3
Blank ballots	0	0.00	±0.00		
**Total**	**8,587**			**17**	**±0**
Valid votes	8,587	100.00	+1.72		
Invalid votes	0	0.00	−1.72		
**Votes cast / turnout**	**8,587**	**64.57**	**+3.40**		
Abstentions	4,711	35.43	−3.40		
**Registered voters**	**13,298**				
Sources
Footnotes: ^{1} People's Coalition results are compared to Democratic Coalition totals in the 1979 election.; ^{2} United Left of Aragon results are compared to Communist Movement–Organization of Communist Left totals in the 1979 election.

=== Huesca ===
Population: 41,455

← Summary of the 8 May 1983 City Council of Huesca election results →
Parties and alliances	Popular vote			Seats	
Parties and alliances	Votes	%	±pp	Total	+/−
Spanish Socialist Workers' Party (PSOE)	9,033	45.58	+15.99	**11**	+4
People's Coalition (AP–PDP–UL)	7,326	36.96	New	**9**	+9
Regionalist Aragonese Party (PAR)	1,038	5.24	New	**1**	+1
Communist Party of Spain (PCE)	990	4.99	−0.79	0	−1
Democratic and Social Centre (CDS)	899	4.54	New	0	±0
Liberal Democratic Party (PDL)	534	2.69	New	0	±0
Union of the Democratic Centre (UCD)	n/a	n/a	−42.42	0	−10
Independent of Huesca (IdH)	n/a	n/a	−11.13	0	−2
Communist Movement of Aragon (MCA)	n/a	n/a	−5.80	0	−1
Blank ballots	0	0.00	±0.00		
**Total**	**19,820**			**21**	**±0**
Valid votes	19,820	100.00	+2.12		
Invalid votes	0	0.00	−2.12		
**Votes cast / turnout**	**19,820**	**63.67**	**+0.32**		
Abstentions	11,310	36.33	−0.32		
**Registered voters**	**31,130**				

=== Teruel ===
Population: 25,935

← Summary of the 8 May 1983 City Council of Teruel election results →
Parties and alliances	Popular vote			Seats	
Parties and alliances	Votes	%	±pp	Total	+/−
People's Coalition (AP–PDP–UL)	4,144	30.83	New	**7**	+7
Spanish Socialist Workers' Party (PSOE)	3,981	29.62	+4.78	**7**	+2
Free Independents (IL)	3,701	27.53	New	**6**	+6
Regionalist Aragonese Party (PAR)	785	5.84	New	**1**	+1
Democratic and Social Centre (CDS)	344	2.56	New	0	±0
Communist Party of Spain (PCE)	252	1.87	−4.16	0	−1
United Left of Aragon (MCA–LCR)^{1}	235	1.75	+0.84	0	±0
Union of the Democratic Centre (UCD)	n/a	n/a	−44.28	0	−10
Electoral Group of Teruel (AET)	n/a	n/a	−22.31	0	−5
Blank ballots	0	0.00	±0.00		
**Total**	**13,442**			**21**	**±0**
Valid votes	13,442	100.00	±0.00		
Invalid votes	0	0.00	±0.00		
**Votes cast / turnout**	**13,442**	**65.52**	**+3.12**		
Abstentions	7,074	34.48	−3.12		
**Registered voters**	**20,516**				
Sources
Footnotes: ^{1} United Left of Aragon results are compared to Communist Movement of Aragon totals in the 1979 election.

=== Zaragoza ===
Population: 571,855

← Summary of the 8 May 1983 City Council of Zaragoza election results →
Parties and alliances	Popular vote			Seats	
Parties and alliances	Votes	%	±pp	Total	+/−
Spanish Socialist Workers' Party (PSOE)	136,774	52.36	+21.45	**18**	+7
People's Coalition (AP–PDP–UL)^{1}	58,134	22.25	+19.75	**8**	+8
Regionalist Aragonese Party (PAR)	34,812	13.33	−5.22	**4**	−3
Communist Party of Spain (PCE)	14,184	5.43	−5.96	**1**	−3
Democratic and Social Centre (CDS)	8,219	3.15	New	0	±0
United Left of Aragon (MCA–LCR)^{2}	4,494	1.72	−2.74	0	±0
Workers' Socialist Party (PST)	2,820	1.08	New	0	±0
Communist Party of Aragon (PCA)	828	0.32	New	0	±0
Social Aragonese Movement (MAS)	692	0.26	New	0	±0
Popular Struggle Coalition (CLP)	261	0.10	New	0	±0
Union of the Democratic Centre (UCD)	n/a	n/a	−20.47	0	−7
Party of Labour of Aragon (PTA)	n/a	n/a	−6.58	0	−2
Blank ballots	0	0.00	±0.00		
**Total**	**261,218**			**31**	**±0**
Valid votes	261,218	100.00	+1.32		
Invalid votes	0	0.00	−1.32		
**Votes cast / turnout**	**261,218**	**61.76**	**+3.20**		
Abstentions	161,715	38.24	−3.20		
**Registered voters**	**422,933**				
Sources
Footnotes: ^{1} People's Coalition results are compared to Democratic Coalition totals in the 1979 election.; ^{2} United Left of Aragon results are compared to the combined totals of Communist Movement–Organization of Communist Left and Revolutionary Communist League in the 1979 election.

== See also ==
- 1983 Aragonese regional election
