= 1987 Spanish local elections in Aragon =

This article presents the results breakdown of the local elections held in Aragon on 10 June 1987. The following tables show detailed results in the autonomous community's most populous municipalities, sorted alphabetically.

== City control ==
The following table lists party control in the most populous municipalities, including provincial capitals (highlighted in bold). Gains for a party are highlighted in that party's colour.

Municipality	Population	Previous control	New control
Calatayud	17,824	Regionalist Aragonese Party (PAR)	Spanish Socialist Workers' Party (PSOE) (PAR in 1988)
**Huesca**	40,736	Spanish Socialist Workers' Party (PSOE)	Spanish Socialist Workers' Party (PSOE)
**Teruel**	27,226	Regionalist Aragonese Party (PAR)	Spanish Socialist Workers' Party (PSOE)
**Zaragoza**	573,662	Spanish Socialist Workers' Party (PSOE)	Spanish Socialist Workers' Party (PSOE)

== Municipalities ==
=== Calatayud ===
Population: 17,824

← Summary of the 10 June 1987 City Council of Calatayud election results →
Parties and alliances	Popular vote			Seats	
Parties and alliances	Votes	%	±pp	Total	+/−
Spanish Socialist Workers' Party (PSOE)	3,359	35.51	−2.22	**6**	−1
Regionalist Aragonese Party (PAR)	1,973	20.86	−13.16	**4**	−3
Democratic and Social Centre (CDS)	1,714	18.12	+14.49	**3**	+3
People's Alliance (AP)^{1}	1,044	11.04	−2.32	**2**	±0
Aragon Alternative Convergence–United Left (CAA–IU)	656	6.94	New	**1**	+1
People's Democratic Party (PDP)	540	5.71	New	**1**	+1
United Left of Aragon (MCA–LCR)	n/a	n/a	−7.64	0	−1
Blank ballots	173	1.83	+1.83		
**Total**	**9,459**			**17**	**±0**
Valid votes	9,459	98.23	−1.77		
Invalid votes	170	1.77	+1.77		
**Votes cast / turnout**	**9,629**	**68.46**	**+3.89**		
Abstentions	4,437	31.54	−3.89		
**Registered voters**	**14,066**				
Sources
Footnotes: ^{1} People's Alliance results are compared to People's Coalition totals in the 1983 election.

=== Huesca ===
Population: 40,736

← Summary of the 10 June 1987 City Council of Huesca election results →
Parties and alliances	Popular vote			Seats	
Parties and alliances	Votes	%	±pp	Total	+/−
Spanish Socialist Workers' Party (PSOE)	8,202	39.30	−6.28	**10**	−1
People's Alliance (AP)^{1}	4,453	21.34	−15.62	**5**	−4
Regionalist Aragonese Party (PAR)	3,229	15.47	+10.23	**4**	+3
Democratic and Social Centre (CDS)	2,311	11.07	+6.53	**2**	+2
Aragon Alternative Convergence–United Left (CAA–IU)^{2}	980	4.70	−0.29	0	±0
People's Democratic Party (PDP)	582	2.79	New	0	±0
Aragonese Union (UA–CHA)	470	2.25	New	0	±0
Workers' Party of Spain–Communist Unity (PTE–UC)	247	1.18	New	0	±0
Humanist Platform (PH)	70	0.34	New	0	±0
Republican Popular Unity (UPR)	37	0.18	+0.14	0	±0
Blank ballots	289	1.38	+1.38		
**Total**	**20,870**			**21**	**±0**
Valid votes	20,870	98.56	−1.44		
Invalid votes	305	1.44	+1.44		
**Votes cast / turnout**	**21,175**	**68.50**	**+4.83**		
Abstentions	9,736	31.50	−4.83		
**Registered voters**	**30,911**				
Sources
Footnotes: ^{1} People's Alliance results are compared to People's Coalition totals in the 1983 election.; ^{2} Aragon Alternative Convergence–United Left results are compared to Communist Party of Spain totals in the 1983 election.

=== Teruel ===
Population: 27,226

← Summary of the 10 June 1987 City Council of Teruel election results →
Parties and alliances	Popular vote			Seats	
Parties and alliances	Votes	%	±pp	Total	+/−
Spanish Socialist Workers' Party (PSOE)	4,033	28.43	−1.19	**7**	±0
People's Alliance (AP)^{1}	3,840	27.07	−3.76	**6**	−1
Free Independents (IL)	2,674	18.85	−8.68	**4**	−2
Democratic and Social Centre (CDS)	1,367	9.63	+7.07	**2**	+2
Regionalist Aragonese Party (PAR)	1,100	7.75	+1.91	**2**	+1
People's Democratic Party (PDP)	455	3.21	New	0	±0
Aragon Alternative Convergence–United Left (CAA–IU)^{2}	352	2.48	+0.61	0	±0
Aragonese Union (UA–CHA)	75	0.53	New	0	±0
Humanist Platform (PH)	40	0.28	New	0	±0
Blank ballots	252	1.78	+1.78		
**Total**	**14,188**			**21**	**±0**
Valid votes	14,188	99.00	−1.00		
Invalid votes	143	1.00	+1.00		
**Votes cast / turnout**	**14,331**	**69.01**	**+3.49**		
Abstentions	6,437	30.99	−3.49		
**Registered voters**	**20,768**				
Sources
Footnotes: ^{1} People's Alliance results are compared to People's Coalition totals in the 1983 election.; ^{2} Aragon Alternative Convergence–United Left results are compared to Communist Party of Spain totals in the 1983 election.

=== Zaragoza ===
Population: 573,662

== See also ==
- 1987 Aragonese regional election
