= Rosa María Serrano Sierra =

Spanish politician (born 1969)

Rosa María Serrano Sierra MEP
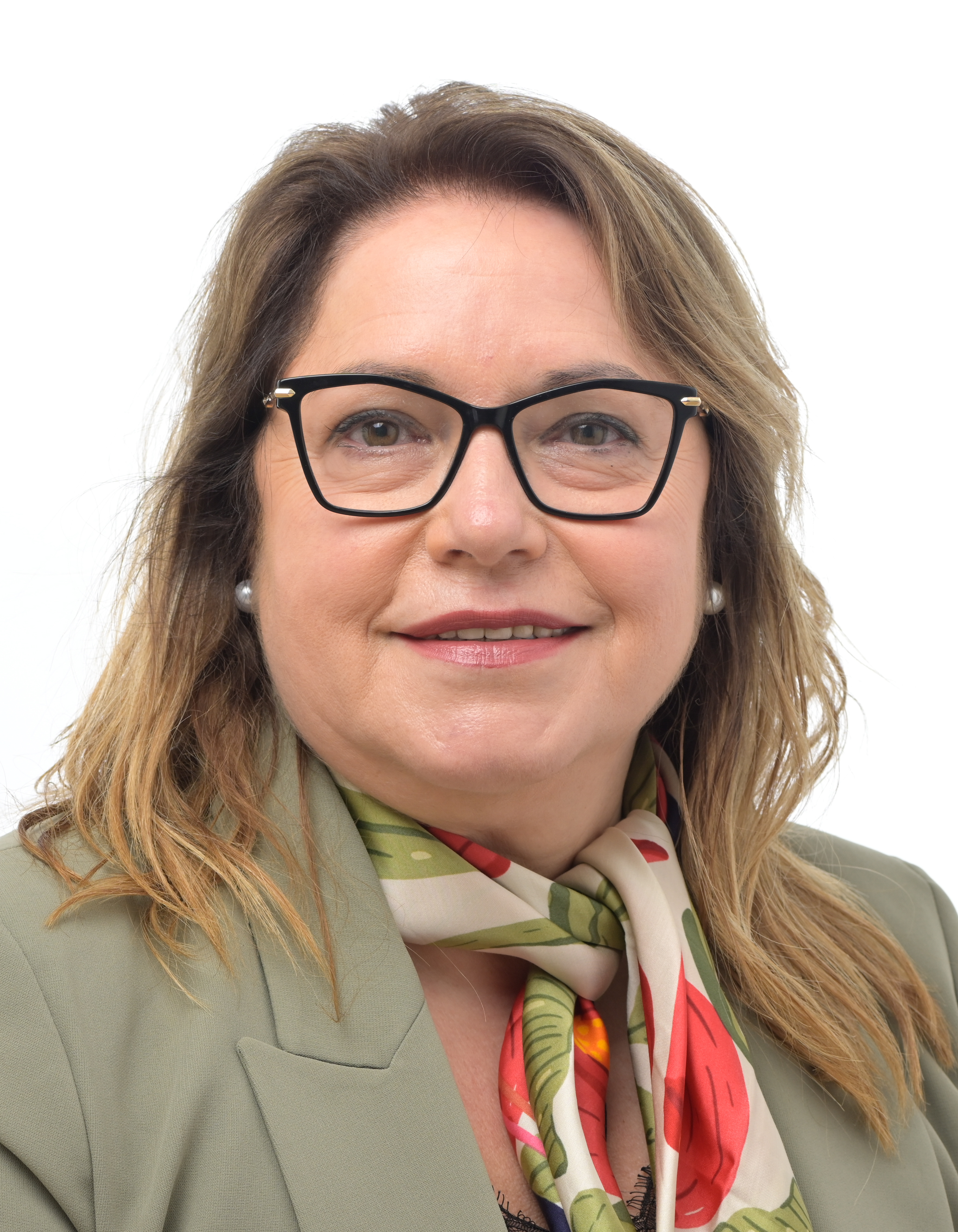
- Serrano Sierra in 2024

Member of the European Parliament for Spain
- Incumbent
- Assumed office 16 July 2024

Member of the Senate of Spain
- In office 17 August 2023 – 30 June 2024
- Succeeded by: Miguel Gracia Ferrer
- Constituency: Huesca
- In office 3 December 2019 – 28 July 2021
- Succeeded by: Rubén Villacampa
- Constituency: Huesca

Delegate of the Government of Spain in Aragon
- In office 27 July 2021 – 13 June 2023
- Prime Minister: Pedro Sánchez
- Preceded by: Pilar Alegría
- Succeeded by: Fernando Beltrán

Personal details
- Born: 11 November 1969 (age 56)
- Party: Spanish Socialist Workers' Party
- Other political affiliations: Party of European Socialists

Rosa María Serrano Sierra (Spanish pronunciation: [rosamaˈɾi.a seˈrano ˈsjera]; born 11 November 1969) is a Spanish politician of the Spanish Socialist Workers' Party who was elected member of the European Parliament in 2024. She previously served in the Senate of Spain and as government delegate in Aragon.
