= Communist Left Youth =

Communist Left Youth Communist Left Youth
- Founded: 1976
- Ideology: 1976-1977: Council communism Left communism 1977-1979: Marxism–Leninism
- Mother party: Organisation of the Communist Left

JIC sticker calling for abstention in the 1976 constitutional referendum

Catalan version of the sticker

Communist Left Youth (in Spanish: Juventudes de Izquierda Comunista, in Catalan: Joventuts d'Esquerra Comunista) was a Spanish youth organization. It was the youth wing of the Organization of Communist Left (OIC), which in 1979 merged into the Communist Movement (MC). JIC was legally registered with the Interior Ministry (as a political party) on October 31, 1977.
