= Emilio Gastón =

Spanish politician, lawyer, and poet

Emilio Gastón Sanz

Member of the Congress of Deputies
- In office 1977–1979
- Constituency: Zaragoza

Justicia de Aragón
- In office 1987–1993

Personal details
- Born: 8 January 1935 Zaragoza, Spain
- Died: 22 January 2018 (aged 83)
- Spouse: Mari Carmen Gascón Baquero
- Occupation: Politician, Lawyer, Poet

Emilio Gastón Sanz (8 January 1935 – 22 January 2018) was a Spanish politician, lawyer, and poet.

A native of Zaragoza born in 1935, Gastón was a practicing lawyer. He was elected to the constituent Congress of Deputies as a representative of Zaragoza in 1977, and served until 1979. Gastón was the Justicia de Aragón ("Justice of Aragon", a regional ombudsman) between 1987 and 1993, the first person to assume the position after promulgation of the Statute of Autonomy. He was married to poet Mari Carmen Gascón Baquero.
