= 1991 Spanish local elections in Aragon =

This article presents the results breakdown of the local elections held in Aragon on 26 May 1991. The following tables show detailed results in the autonomous community's most populous municipalities, sorted alphabetically.

== City control ==
The following table lists party control in the most populous municipalities, including provincial capitals (highlighted in bold). Gains for a party are highlighted in that party's colour.

Municipality	Population	Previous control	New control
Calatayud	17,623	Regionalist Aragonese Party (PAR)	Spanish Socialist Workers' Party (PSOE)
**Huesca**	42,805	Spanish Socialist Workers' Party (PSOE)	Spanish Socialist Workers' Party (PSOE)
**Teruel**	28,488	Spanish Socialist Workers' Party (PSOE)	Regionalist Aragonese Party (PAR)
**Zaragoza**	592,686	Spanish Socialist Workers' Party (PSOE)	Spanish Socialist Workers' Party (PSOE)

== Municipalities ==
=== Calatayud ===
Population: 17,623

← Summary of the 26 May 1991 City Council of Calatayud election results →
Parties and alliances	Popular vote			Seats	
Parties and alliances	Votes	%	±pp	Total	+/−
Spanish Socialist Workers' Party (PSOE)	5,304	55.23	+19.72	**11**	+5
People's Party (PP)^{1}	2,581	26.87	+10.12	**5**	+2
Aragonese Party (PAR)	719	7.49	−13.37	**1**	−3
Aragon Alternative Convergence–United Left (CAA–IU)	305	3.18	−3.76	0	−1
Independent Aragonese Party (PAI)	294	3.06	New	0	±0
Democratic and Social Centre (CDS)	169	1.76	−16.36	0	−3
Aragonese Union (CHA)	142	1.48	New	0	±0
Blank ballots	90	0.94	−0.89		
**Total**	**9,604**			**17**	**±0**
Valid votes	9,604	99.55	+1.32		
Invalid votes	43	0.45	−1.32		
**Votes cast / turnout**	**9,647**	**68.44**	**−0.02**		
Abstentions	4,448	31.56	+0.02		
**Registered voters**	**14,095**				
Sources
Footnotes: ^{1} People's Party results are compared to the combined totals of People's Alliance and People's Democratic Party in the 1987 election.

=== Huesca ===
Population: 42,805

← Summary of the 26 May 1991 City Council of Huesca election results →
Parties and alliances	Popular vote			Seats	
Parties and alliances	Votes	%	±pp	Total	+/−
Spanish Socialist Workers' Party (PSOE)	6,664	33.29	−6.01	**8**	−2
People's Party (PP)^{1}	4,730	23.63	−0.50	**5**	±0
Aragonese Party (PAR)	4,423	22.09	+6.62	**5**	+1
Aragon Alternative Convergence–United Left (CAA–IU)	1,835	9.17	+4.47	**2**	+2
Democratic and Social Centre (CDS)	1,347	6.73	−4.34	**1**	−1
Aragonese Union (CHA)	735	3.67	+1.42	0	±0
Blank ballots	287	1.43	+0.05		
**Total**	**20,021**			**21**	**±0**
Valid votes	20,021	99.39	+0.83		
Invalid votes	122	0.61	−0.83		
**Votes cast / turnout**	**20,143**	**60.21**	**−8.29**		
Abstentions	13,313	39.79	+8.29		
**Registered voters**	**33,456**				
Sources
Footnotes: ^{1} People's Party results are compared to the combined totals of People's Alliance and People's Democratic Party in the 1987 election.

=== Teruel ===
Population: 28,488

← Summary of the 26 May 1991 City Council of Teruel election results →
Parties and alliances	Popular vote			Seats	
Parties and alliances	Votes	%	±pp	Total	+/−
Spanish Socialist Workers' Party (PSOE)	4,739	35.03	+6.60	**9**	+2
People's Party (PP)^{1}	3,948	29.18	−1.10	**7**	+1
Aragonese Party (PAR)	2,378	17.58	+9.83	**4**	+2
Aragonese Union (CHA)	776	5.74	+5.21	**1**	+1
Independents for Teruel (IpT)	647	4.78	New	0	±0
Democratic and Social Centre (CDS)	499	3.69	−5.94	0	−2
Aragon Alternative Convergence–United Left (CAA–IU)	361	2.67	+0.19	0	±0
Free Independents (IL)	n/a	n/a	−18.85	0	−4
Blank ballots	182	1.35	−0.43		
**Total**	**13,530**			**21**	**±0**
Valid votes	13,530	99.31	+0.31		
Invalid votes	94	0.69	−0.31		
**Votes cast / turnout**	**13,624**	**62.26**	**−6.75**		
Abstentions	8,258	37.74	+6.75		
**Registered voters**	**21,882**				
Sources
Footnotes: ^{1} People's Party results are compared to the combined totals of People's Alliance and People's Democratic Party in the 1987 election.

=== Zaragoza ===
Population: 592,686

== See also ==
- 1991 Aragonese regional election
