= Alternative Left (Spain) =

Spanish political party

Alternative Left Izquierda Alternativa
- Founded: 1991
- Dissolved: 1993
- Merger of: Revolutionary Communist League; Communist Movement
- Newspaper: Página Abierta; Viento Sur
- Ideology: Socialism; Marxism; Sovereignism; Feminism; Antimilitarism; Ecologism; Republicanism
- Political position: Left-wing to far-left
- Town councillors in Spain (1991-1993): 10 / 66,308 7 elected as Batzarre, 2 as EMK-LKI and 1 as MCG

Alternative Left (Spanish language: Izquierda Alternativa, IA) was a Spanish political party with a socialist ideology formed by the union of the Revolutionary Communist League (LCR) and the Communist Movement (MC) in 1991.

== History ==
=== Foundation ===
The merger in 1989 of the respective territorial organizations of the MC and the LCR in the Basque Country; Euskadiko Mugimendu Komunista (EMK) and Liga Komunista Iraultzailea (LKI), as Batzarre in Navarre and Zutik in the Basque Autonomous Community, led to calls for a rethinking of the new conditions for unity between the two parties. Finally, an agreed was reached in March 1991 to the unification of the two groups, which was made effective in November 1991. The new organization had a joint leadership of 50 members from the LCR and 50 from the MC. IA had a confederal structure, being formed by the following confederated organizations:

- Liberación in Madrid
- Revolta in Catalonia and the Valencian Country
- Alternative Action in Andalusia
- Inzar in Galiza
- Lliberación in Asturies
- Zutik in the Basque Autonomous Community
- Batzarre in Navarre
- Liberazión in Aragón

=== Dissolution ===
IA had a very short life because of the different "styles", culture and political objectives that existed in the two parties. The MC sector planned to evolve to a "non-political party" social collective, that would push for society self-organization, while the LCR defended a classic political party project. Also, the former members of the LCR feared being swallowed by the larger MC.

Finally, Alternative Left split into two nationwide: the LCR group stayed with the name, later to integrate with Jaime Pastor as their main leader, in the United Left in November 1993 (though in the process of infighting the organization lost up to a third of its membership) and the MC group stayed with the name of some of the territorial organizations of IA. The merger, however, survived in Asturias as Lliberación (dissolved in 2010), in Galiza with the name of Inzar (integrated into the BNG and dissolved in 2012), in the Basque Country as Zutik (dissolved in 2011), and in Navarre as Batzarre (integrated in Izquierda-Ezkerra).
