= Murder of Miquel Grau =

1977 crime in Spain

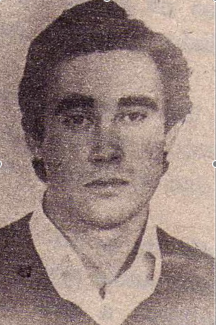
- Miquel Grau Gómez
- Location: Alicante, Spain
- Date: 6 October 1977
- Attack type: murder
- Weapon: brick
- Deaths: 1
- Victim: Miquel Grau Gómez
- Perpetrator: Miguel Ángel Panadero
- Verdict: guilty; sentence 12 years

The murder of Miquel Grau Gómez occurred on 6 October 1977 in the city of Alicante, Valencian Community, Spain. Grau, a young native of Rafal (Alicante), was killed by a brick thrown at him by Miguel Panadero while putting up posters calling for the National Day of the Valencian Country. Panadero was a militant of the extreme right party New Force.

== Murder ==
On 9 October 1977, the National Day of the Valencian Country was to be celebrated legally for the first time. In the run-up to 9 October, various political parties coordinated the putting up of posters in Alicante.

On the night of 6 October 1977, four members of a group organized by the Communist Movement of the Valencian Country were in the Plaza de Los Luceros putting up posters which called for the pre-Diada (the day before 9 October). They were Llum Quiñonero (24), Miquel Grau (22), Juan Ángel Torrerosa (19) and Javier Álvarez (14). A New Force militant, Miguel Ángel Panadero Sandoval, threw a brick from his balcony which hit Grau on the head and left him in a coma. With the help of a passing driver, he was taken to the Hospital 20 de Noviembre, where he was admitted; ten days later, on 16 October, Grau died of his injuries.

== Funeral and burial ==
Grau's funeral, organized by eighteen political parties and trade union centres, was celebrated at the San Martin church of Valencia. According to El País, 7,000 to 10,000 people attended the funeral, occupying the church and the surrounding streets. A militant of the Communist Movement of the Valencian Country read a text in eulogy:

Miquel was killed because he opposed fascism, because he wanted freedom for our people, because he wanted autonomy for the Valencian Country. This is not an isolated fascist attack. Militants of democratic parties have been attacked in Valencia and Alicante. They planted bombs in bookshops and theatres. The threat to democrats has not stopped.

— Fragment of text read at the funeral of Miquel Grau.

Grau was buried in the Nuestra Señora del Remedio cemetery in Alicante. 18,000 people joined the procession in order to accompany his coffin to the cemetery; however, acting under orders from the Civil Governor, anti-riot squads of the Armed Police blocked the procession and took the coffin from them in order to move it quickly to the cemetery by car. The police attacked and dispersed the crowds who tried to reach the cemetery.

== Trial, sentence and pardon ==
Miguel Ángel Panadero turned himself in to the police in October 1977. The trial was held on 2 June 1978 in the Provincial Court of Alicante. Spanish law allows for additional third-party prosecutions in criminal trials ("acusación popular" or "popular prosecution"); therefore, in addition to the public prosecutor, there were two popular prosecutions: one brought by Grau's family and a public accusation presented by Juan María Bandrés, who represented collectively the MCPV, People's Socialist Party, Unión Sindical Obrera, Revolutionary Communist League, Workers' Communist Party and other organizations. A multitude of extreme right sympathizers and neofascists attended the trial, as well as Grau's family, friends and left-wing militants. The main question raised in the trial was the determination of whether or not the murder had political motivations. Panadero claimed he had no relation with any Fascist group and he had only acted out of annoyance at the posters; however, two witnesses linked him to Fascist movements. The public prosecutor asked for a sentence of fourteen years in prison and the popular prosecution asked for twenty years. Ultimately, Miguel Ángel Panadero was sentenced to twelve years and one day of ordinary imprisonment ("reclusión menor"). The defence presented an appeal that was dismissed by the Supreme Court in January 1979.

In May 1979, the Minister of Justice of the Suárez government, Íñigo Cavero, gave a partial pardon to Miguel Ángel Panadero, changing the twelve year sentence of ordinary prison for six years of special imprisonment ("reclusión mayor"). Thanks to this partial pardon, Panadero was released in 1982.

== Memorial ==
In 2015, the city of Alicante installed a commemorative plaque in the Plaza de Los Luceros, in the exact location of the murder. Grau received a posthumous Gold Medal of the City and a street with his name was approved. This commemoration was an initiative by the Compromís per Alacant party, supported by every other represented party.

== In popular culture ==
- The band Al Tall released the Catalan song "A Miquel assasinaren" ("Miquel assassinated") in 1978, in memoriam of Miquel Grau.
