= Communist Movement of Aragon =

Communist Movement of Aragon Movimento Comunista
- Catalan name: Moviment Comunista d'Aragó
- Aragonese name: Movimiento Comunista d'Aragón
- Leader: Alícia Francisca Mas Arrondo; Mercedes Gallizo
- Founded: 1976; 50 years ago
- Dissolved: 1991; 35 years ago
- Merged into: Liberazión
- Newspaper: Servir al Pueblo; Aragón Obrero y Campesino
- Youth wing: Aragonese Revolutionary Youth
- Union affiliation: Comisiones Obreras
- Student wings: Comités de Estudiantes Revolucionarios de Zaragoza (University of Zaragoza); Comités de Estudiantes de Enseñanza Media
- Ideology: Communism; Marxism-Leninism; Aragonese nationalism Feminism; Antimilitarism; Until 1983: Maoism
- Political position: Far-left
- National affiliation: Communist Movement
- Town councillors in Aragón (1979-1983): 7 / 4,651

Communist Movement of Aragón (in Spanish: Movimiento Comunista de Aragón. MCA) was the federated political party of the Communist Movement (MC) in Aragón. The MCA was founded in 1976, as the continuation of the Communist Organization of Zaragoza

== Ideology ==
Originally the MCA was a Maoist party, inspired by the Chinese Cultural Revolution, but over the years, specially after 1981–82, the organization gradually abandoned its previous ideologies (Orthodox Marxism, Leninism, Maoism) in favour of more heterodox forms of Marxism. The party was also supportive of the Feminist, Aragonese language, LGBT and Insurbordinate social movements.

== History ==
The MCA was founded by the members of the Communist Organization of Zaragoza and the militants of the Communist Movement in Aragón in early 1976. At the time the party was illegal. The MCA decided to run for the Spanish elections of 1977, the first democratic ones since 1936. The party was illegal so it had to run as the Aragonese Autonomist Front, in a coalition with the Carlist Party of Aragón. The coalition was only present in the Province of Zaragoza, where they gained 4,906 votes, the 1.11% of the total, failing to win any seat.

The MCA campaigned against the 1978 Spanish Constitution. The party was finally legalized the same year. In 1979 the Organization of the Communist Left of Asturias joined the MCA.

=== Liberazión ===
In 1991, after several years of collaboration, the MCA and the LCR decided to merge, resulting in Lliberación. In 1993 the members of the LCR left Liberazión.
