= Upper Aragon in Common =

Upper Aragon in Common Alto Aragón en Común
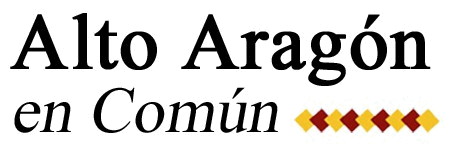
- Founded: 17 October 2015 (alliance); 23 March 2018 (party)
- Dissolved: 2023
- Merger of: Podemos; AeC; Equo
- Political position: Left-wing
- National affiliation: Unidas Podemos

Website
- altoaragonencomun.org

Upper Aragon in Common (Spanish: Alto Aragón en Común, AAeC) was a political party in Spain founded in March 2018. It was originally formed in 2015 as an electoral coalition by Podemos, Now in Common (AeC) and Equo in the province of Huesca ahead of the 2015 Spanish general election.

== Electoral performance ==
=== Cortes Generales ===
Election	Votes	%	#	Congress	Senate
2015	21,943	17.96	3rd	1 / 3	0 / 4
2016	22,430	19.19	3rd	1 / 3	0 / 4
2019 (Apr.)	17,151	13.69	4th	0 / 3	0 / 4
2019 (Nov.)	14,035	12.36	4th	0 / 3	0 / 4
