= Socialist Party of Aragon =

Socialist Party of Aragon Partido Socialista de Aragón
- Leader: Emilio Gastón
- Secretary-General: Santiago Marraco
- Founded: 1976
- Dissolved: 1983
- Merger of: Socialist Alliance of Aragón; Andalán group Independents
- Merged into: PSOE (social democratic sector); Aragonese Nationalist Movement (nationalist sector)
- Ideology: Democratic Socialism; Aragonese nationalism Federalism; Republicanism
- Political position: Left-wing
- National affiliation: Socialist Unity (1977)
- Congreso de los Diputados (1977-1979): 1 / 350

Socialist Party of Aragon (in Spanish: Partido Socialista de Aragón) was a democratic socialist political party in Aragón, Spain.

== History ==
PSA was formed in 1976 by the Socialist Alliance of Aragón, members of the magazine and cultural group Andalán and independents close to socialist Aragonesism. The party was formed in the home of Ángela Abós Ballarín. The Aragonese section of Socialist Reconstruction, a group of members of the Unión Sindical Obrera trade union, also joined the party later. The party joined the Federation of Socialist Parties 7 March 1976.

In the elections of 1977 the party gained one seat in the Congress of Deputies, in a coalition with the People's Socialist Party called Socialist Unity. In 1978, some members of the party joined the PSOE, the majority of them from the moderate wing of the party. Other members of the party, from the more radical and nationalist wing, formed the Nationalist Movement of Aragón the same year, along with people from the Rolde de Estudios Nacionalistas Aragonés association.

The party disappeared in 1983, after several electoral failures. Their members split between those that joined the Socialist Party and the ones that joined the Nationalist Movement.

== See also ==
- People's Socialist Party
- Chunta Aragonesista
