= Communist Movement =

Communist Movement Movimiento Comunista
- Secretary-General: Eugenio del Río
- Founded: 1972
- Dissolved: 1991
- Merger of: Communist Movement of Euskadi; Communist Movement of Asturias; Communist Organisation; Communist Unification; Marxist-Leninist Formation Group of the Islands
- Merged into: Alternative Left (Izquierda Alternativa)
- Headquarters: Spain
- Newspaper: Página Abierta
- Ideology: Marxism–Leninism; Maoism (originally); Marxism (late years)
- Political position: Far-left
- Colors: Red

Communist Movement (in Spanish: Movimiento Comunista, in Basque: Mugimendu Komunista, in Catalan: Moviment Comunista, in Galician: Movemento Comunista, in Asturian: Movimientu Comunista) was a political party in Spain. It was founded in 1972 as Movimiento Comunista de España (MCE).

== History ==
The Communist Movement was formed by the Basque Communist Movement - Communists (Movimiento Comunista Vasco - Komunistak) (which was previously known as ETA Berri, a splinter group of ETA), Communist Organisation (Aragon), Communist Unification (Valencia), the Marxist-Leninist Formation Group of the Islands (Balearic Islands) and a grouping of independent communists from Asturias. Initially the party was known as Communist Movement of Spain (Movimiento Comunista de España). The general secretary of MCE was Eugenio del Río.

MCE attempted to unify with the Communist Unification of Spain (UCE), but that relation was later broken.

In 1976, MCE was restricted into a federal organization, and the name changed to MC. Regional affiliates included:

- Communist Movement of Asturias (Movimiento Comunista d'Asturies)
- Communist Movement of Aragon (Movimiento Comunista de Aragón)
- Communist Movement of Castile-León (Movimiento Comunista de Castilla-Léon)
- Communist Movement of Catalonia (Moviment Comunista de Catalunya)
- Communist Movement of Euskadi (Euskadi Mugimendu Komunista)
- Communist Movement of Extremadura (Movimiento Comunista de Extremadura)
- Communist Movement of the Valencian Country (Moviment Comunista del País Valencià)
- Communist Movement of Galicia (Movemento Comunista de Galicia)

MC appealed for abstention in the 1976 referendum.

In the 1977 general elections, MC launched various electoral lists, like CUP in Madrid and CUPS in Catalonia.

On October 6, 1977, a group of MCPV militants and sympathizers were attacked by far-right militants while putting up posters in Alicante. Miquel Grau, a 20-year-old MCPV sympathizer was killed.

In 1979, the Organisation of the Communist Left (OIC) merged into MC.

MCPV and the Revolutionary Communist League (LCR) formed a coalition, United Left of the Valencian Country (EUPV, different body than the present EUPV). In the 1983 regional assembly elections EUPV contested as part of the Valencian People's Union (UPV). Later as MC disintegrated, MCPV and LCR militants in Valencia formed the collective Revolta.

In 1983, the Communist Movement of Euskadi (EMK) separated itself from MC and became an independent organization.

In 1991, MC merged with LCR and formed the Alternative Left (Izquierda Alternativa), which had a brief existence.

== Gallery ==
MC de Extremadura sticker

MC sticker, demanding release of its general secretary Eugenio del Río

MC de Aragón sticker, demanding legalization of political parties
