= Organization of Communist Left =

Organisation of the Communist Left Organización de Izquierda Comunista
- Basque name: Ezker Komunista Erakundea
- Catalan name: Organització d'Esquerra Comunista
- Galician name: Organización de Esquerda Comunista
- Secretary-General: Dídac Fàbregas (1974–1978); José V. Villaescusa (1978–1979)
- Founded: 1974
- Dissolved: 1979
- Merger of: Communist Workers Circles; Grupos Anticapitalistas de Base; Núcleos Obreros Comunistas
- Merged into: Communist Movement
- Headquarters: C/Boltañá, 60, Madrid
- Newspaper: Octubre Rojo
- Youth wing: Juventudes de Izquierda Comunista (JIC)
- Ideology: 1974–1977: Council communism Left communism 1977–1979: Marxism–Leninism
- Political position: Radical left
- Union affiliation: Comisiones Obreras Anticapitalistas
- Colors: Red

Organization of Communist Left (in Spanish: Organización de Izquierda Comunista, in Basque: Ezker Komunista Erakundea, in Catalan: Organització d'Esquerra Comunista, in Galician: Organización de Esquerda Comunista, OIC) was a communist political party in Spain founded in 1974. The OIC was a continuation of the existing Communist Workers Circles (COC), whose roots were in the Workers' Front of Catalonia (FOC), the Catalan version of the People's Liberation Front (FLP or FELIPE).

== History ==
The organization had presence and influence in the labor movement of Vallès Oriental, Tarragona, Almussafes and in the construction sector of Madrid, Illes Balears, Córdoba, Granada and Camp de Morvedre.

The first Secretary General of the OIC was Dídac Fàbregas, who used the "nom de guerre" Jerónimo Hernández. On January 11, 1978 he resigned from his position as Secretary General due to a majority vote in the federal executive in which the fusion with the Communist Movement (MC) was approved. Four days later in a letter to the Federal Executive Commission Dídac Fàbregas renounced to his membership of the party. In January 1978 he joined the Socialist Party of Catalonia-Congress (PSC-C), where he was appointed as the head of the National Committee of Municipal and Urban Policy of this party.

In 1979 the OIC was finally absorbed by the MC, which led to an important part of its former founders and many historical leaders leave the organization, later joining the majority of them the PCE-PSUC or the PSOE. In Mallorca the majority of the local OIC joined the Socialist Party of Majorca (PSM).
