= Revolutionary Communist League (Spain) =

Revolutionary Communist League Liga Comunista Revolucionaria
- Founded: 1971
- Dissolved: 1991
- Merger of: Comunisme; ETA-VI
- Merged into: Alternative Left; Espacio Alternativo
- Headquarters: Madrid
- Newspaper: Combate; Comunismo
- Youth wing: Communist Revolutionary Youth
- Ideology: Communism; Trotskyism; Sovereignism; Feminism; Antimilitarism
- Political position: Far-left
- International: Fourth International (post-reunification)
- Colors: Red
- Town councillors in Spain (1979-1983): 7 / 67,505

Revolutionary Communist League (in Spanish: Liga Comunista Revolucionaria (LCR), in Basque: Liga Komunista Iraultzailea, in Catalan: Lliga Comunista Revolucionària, in Galician: Liga Comunista Revolucionaria) was a political party in Spain. It was founded in 1971 by members of the Catalan group Comunisme, a split of the Popular Liberation Front (FLP). The LCR had a trotskyist ideology, adopting more heterodox political positions in the 1980s.

== History ==
=== Foundation and clandestinity ===
The LCR was founded in 1971 by members of the Catalan group Communisme, a split of the Popular Liberation Front (PLF or Felipe). It was the Spanish section of the Fourth International (post-reunification), one of the fractions of the Trotskyist Fourth International. The LCR had the purpose of being a revolutionary party that rejected class collaboration and advocated a model of territorial organization based in a confederation of republics, recognizing of the right of self-determination for all the peoples of Spain.

In 1972 the LCR suffered a split called Communist League (LC), which joined the LCR again in 1978. In 1973 it merged with a split of ETA after VI Assembly called for that very ETA-VI: the majority of the members of that organization, revolutionary communists, decided to abandon armed struggle as a way of fighting against the Francoist State and decided to seek unity with similar groups in the rest of Spain. With this union the LCR gained presence in the Basque Country, which until then the LCR had not just presence, using the name of LCR-ETA (VI).

=== Transition ===
The death of caudillo Francisco Franco, and partly because of the difficulty of explaining outside the Basque Country that reference to ETA, LCR-ETA (VI) changed again its name to LCR. A new independent, but fraternal, organization was founded in the Basque Country with the name of Liga Komunista Iraultzailea (LKI).

The first meeting of LKI, held in Arantzazu, in 1977 and still in clandestinity, ended with the arrest of all the assembly (150 people), although shortly after the arrest they were released and the party began to be tolerated. After the first democratic elections, legalized. In that elections the LCR supported the Front for Workers' Unity (FUT), that gained 41,208 votes (0.22%). One of the militants LKI in those years was Germán Rodriguez, which was murdered by the Spanish police in Pamplona on July 8, in the incidents of the Sanfermines of 1978.

The following years the LCR supported several local electoral platforms, although in the mid and late 1980s the party generally campaigned in favor of abstention. Thus, in 1978 in Valencia, the LCR supported the United Left of the Valencian Country (EUPV) along with the Communist Movement of the Valencian Country, and nationalist groups, such as Valencian People's Union. In 1980 the LCR supported Unity for Socialism for the autonomic elections in Catalonia, and in 1982 again in Catalonia, supported the Communist Front of Catalonia to the Spanish general elections.

=== Unity with the Communist Movement and ideological changes ===
In the Basque Country, Liga Komunista Iraultzailea, Langile Abertzale Iraultzaileen Alderdia and Nueva Izquierda formed the coalition Auzolan, which also received support from the EMK.

The LCR-MC unit had great importance in the Spanish politics of the 1980s, as they were some of the main promoters of the mobilizations against the NATO (through the Anti-NATO Commission and the Civic Platform) and later against the US bases in Spain, in the trial of the GAL, in the insubordinate movement against the compulsory military service, in the development of the feminist movement or even the first manifestations of the gay pride day. Both groups campaigned for Herri Batasuna (HB) outside of the Basque Country in the elections to the European Parliament of 1987. Collaboration with HB was not without tensions, as both organizations were very critical of the methods of ETA. HB finally gained a seat in Brussels.

=== Dissolution ===
In 1991 MC merged with LCR and formed Alternative Left (Izquierda Alternativa), which had a brief existence.
