= 1991 Spanish local elections =

- 26 May 1991 (Note: By-elections were held on 3 November 1991 in those constituencies where results were annulled by a final sentence following an electoral petition, or where elections were not held due to a lack of candidates.)

66,308 councillors in 8,060 municipal councils All 1,383 provincial/island seats in 44 provinces (Note: Including: 1,032 seats in 38 provincial deputations; 153 seats in 3 Basque foral deputations; 139 seats in 7 Canarian island cabildos; 59 seats in 3 Balearic island councils.)
- Registered: 30,223,384 ▲6.3%
- Turnout: 18,973,514 (62.8%) ▼6.6 pp
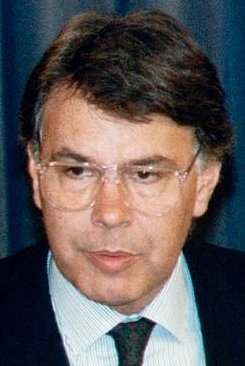

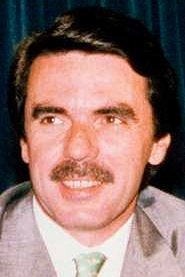

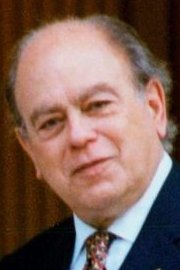

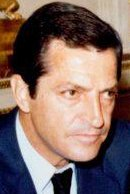

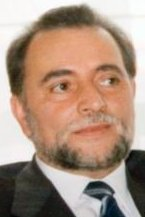

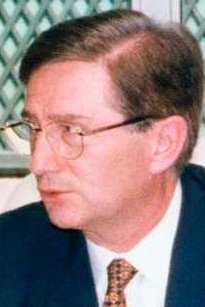
	First party	Second party	Third party
Leader	Felipe González	José María Aznar	Jordi Pujol
Party	PSOE	PP	CiU
Leader since	13 October 1974	4 September 1989	19 September 1978
Last election	23,241 c., 37.1% 588 p.	17,869 c., 22.5% (Note: Results for AP (20.9%, 16,581 c. and 336 p.), PDP (0.9%, 914 c. and 7 p.), SI in Burgos (0.2%, 59 c. and 6 p.), UPN (0.2%, 134 c.), UM (0.2%, 119 c. and 4 p.) and PL (0.1%, 62 c. and 0 p.) in the 1987 elections.); 353 p.	4,373 c., 5.2% 67 p.
Seats won	25,260 c. 628 p.	19,543 c. 391 p.	4,360 c. 68 p.
Seat change	▲2,019 c. ▲40 p.	▲1,674 c. ▲38 p.	▼13 c. ▲1 p.
Popular vote	7,224,242	4,843,733	915,464
Percentage	38.3%	25.7%	4.9%
Swing	▲1.2 pp	▲3.2 pp	▼0.3 pp
	Fourth party	Fifth party	Sixth party
Leader	Adolfo Suárez	Julio Anguita	José María Mur
Party	CDS	IU	PAR
Leader since	29 July 1982	12 February 1989	July 1987
Last election	5,972 c., 9.8% 116 p.	2,681 c., 8.2% (Note: Results for IU (8.0%, 2,641 c. and 45 p.) and AC–INC (0.2%, 40 c. and 3 p.) in the 1987 elections.); 48 p.	896 c., 0.7% 13 p.
Seats won	2,939 c. 32 p.	2,644 c. 46 p.	1,221 c. 15 p.
Seat change	▼3,033 c. ▼84 p.	▲37 c. ▼2 p.	▲325 c. ▲2 p.
Popular vote	731,331	1,605,285	128,025
Percentage	3.9%	8.4%	0.7%
Swing	▼5.9 pp	▲0.2 pp	0.0 pp
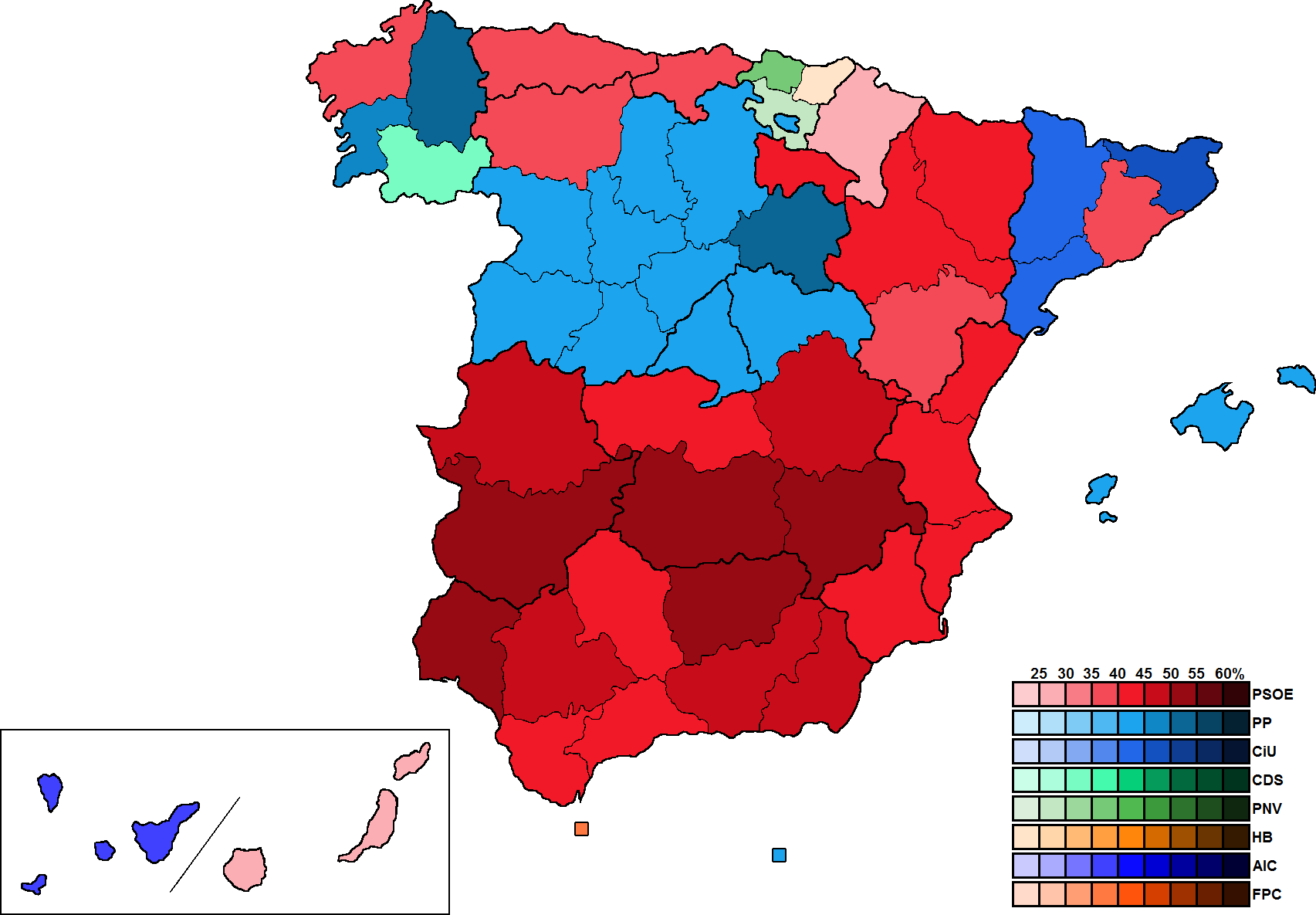
- Provincial results map for municipal elections

Local elections were held in Spain on 26 May 1991 to elect all 66,308 councillors in the 8,060 Spanish municipalities, all 1,185 provincial seats in 41 provinces (including 38 indirectly-elected provincial deputations and the three foral deputations in the Basque Country) and 198 seats in ten island councils (seven Canarian and three Balearic ones). They were held concurrently with regional elections in thirteen autonomous communities.

== Overview ==
=== Local government ===
Under the 1978 Constitution, the governance of municipalities in Spain was centered on the figure of city councils (Spanish: ayuntamientos), local corporations with independent legal personality composed of a mayor, a government council and an elected legislative assembly. The mayor was indirectly elected by the local assembly, requiring an absolute majority; otherwise, the candidate from the most-voted party automatically became mayor (ties were resolved by drawing lots). The concejo abierto system (English: open council), under which voters directly elected the local mayor by plurality voting, was reserved for municipalities under 100 inhabitants and some minor local entities.

Provincial deputations were the governing bodies of provinces in Spain—except for single-province autonomous communities—having an administration role of municipal activities and composed of a provincial president, an administrative body, and a plenary. For insular provinces, such as the Balearic and Canary Islands, deputations were replaced by island councils in each of the islands or group of islands. For Gran Canaria, Tenerife, Fuerteventura, La Gomera, El Hierro, Lanzarote and La Palma, this figure was referred to in Spanish as cabildo insular, whereas for Mallorca, Menorca and Ibiza–Formentera, its name was consejo insular (Catalan: consell insular). (Note: For the Balearic Islands, regional lawmakers served as island councillors.) The three Basque provinces had foral deputations instead (called General Assemblies, or Juntas Generales).

=== Date ===
The term of local assemblies in Spain expired four years after the date of their previous election, with amendments earlier in 1991 fixing election day for the fourth Sunday of May every four years. The election decree was required to be issued between 54 and 60 days before the scheduled election date and published on the following day in the Official State Gazette (BOE). The previous local elections were held on 10 June 1987, setting the date for election day on the fourth Sunday of May four years later, which was 26 May 1991.

Local assemblies could not be dissolved before the expiration of their term, except in cases of mismanagement that seriously harmed the public interest and implied a breach of constitutional obligations, in which case the Council of Ministers could—optionally—decide to call a by-election.

Elections to the assemblies of local entities were officially called on 2 April 1991 with the publication of the corresponding decree in the BOE, setting election day for 26 May. Subsequent by-elections were called on 10 September, for 3 November.

=== Electoral system ===
Voting for local assemblies and Canarian island councils was based on universal suffrage, comprising all Spanish nationals over 18 years of age, registered and residing in the municipality or council and with full political rights (provided that they had not been deprived of the right to vote by a final sentence, nor were legally incapacitated), as well as resident non-nationals whose country of origin allowed reciprocal voting by virtue of a treaty or within the framework of Community Law.

Local councillors were elected using the D'Hondt method and closed-list proportional voting, with a five percent-threshold of valid votes (including blank ballots) in each constituency. Each municipality or council was a multi-member constituency, with a number of seats based on the following scale:

Population	Councillors		
Population	Municipalities	Canary Islands	Balearic Islands
<250	5	No island below 5,000 inhabitants	Fixed number: Ibiza–Formentera: 13; Menorca: 13; Mallorca: 33
251–1,000	7	No island below 5,000 inhabitants	Fixed number: Ibiza–Formentera: 13; Menorca: 13; Mallorca: 33
1,001–2,000	9	No island below 5,000 inhabitants	Fixed number: Ibiza–Formentera: 13; Menorca: 13; Mallorca: 33
2,001–5,000	11	No island below 5,000 inhabitants	Fixed number: Ibiza–Formentera: 13; Menorca: 13; Mallorca: 33
5,001–10,000	13	11	Fixed number: Ibiza–Formentera: 13; Menorca: 13; Mallorca: 33
10,001–20,000	17	13	Fixed number: Ibiza–Formentera: 13; Menorca: 13; Mallorca: 33
20,001–50,000	21	17	Fixed number: Ibiza–Formentera: 13; Menorca: 13; Mallorca: 33
50,001–100,000	25	21	Fixed number: Ibiza–Formentera: 13; Menorca: 13; Mallorca: 33
>100,001	+1 per each 100,000 inhabitants or fraction +1 if total is an even number		Fixed number: Ibiza–Formentera: 13; Menorca: 13; Mallorca: 33

Councillors in municipalities between 100 and 250 inhabitants were elected using open-list partial block voting, with voters choosing up to four candidates.

Most provincial deputations were indirectly elected from among the elected municipal councillors in each judicial district. Seats were allocated to provincial deputations based on the following scale (with each judicial district being assigned an initial minimum of one seat and the remaining ones distributed in proportion to population):

Population	Seats
<500,000	25
500,001–1,000,000	27
1,000,001–3,500,000	31
>3,500,001	51

The General Assemblies of Álava, Biscay and Gipuzkoa were directly elected by voters under their own, specific electoral regulations.

The law did not provide for by-elections to fill vacant seats; instead, any vacancies arising after the proclamation of candidates and during the legislative term were filled by the next candidates on the party lists or, when required, by designated substitutes.

== Parties and candidates ==
The electoral law allowed for parties and federations registered in the interior ministry, alliances and groupings of electors to present lists of candidates. Parties and federations intending to form an alliance were required to inform the relevant electoral commission within 10 days of the election call, whereas groupings of electors needed to secure the signature of a determined amount of the electors registered in the municipality for which they sought election, disallowing electors from signing for more than one list:

- At least one percent of the electors in municipalities with a population below 5,000 inhabitants, provided that the number of signers was more than double that of councillors at stake.
- At least 100 signatures in municipalities with a population between 5,001 and 10,000.
- At least 500 signatures in municipalities with a population between 10,001 and 50,000.
- At least 1,500 signatures in municipalities with a population between 50,001 and 150,000.
- At least 3,000 signatures in municipalities with a population between 150,001 and 300,000.
- At least 5,000 signatures in municipalities with a population between 300,001 and 1,000,000.
- At least 8,000 signatures in municipalities with a population over 1,000,001.

== Results ==
=== Municipal ===
==== Overall ====
← Summary of the 26 May 1991 Spanish municipal election results →
Parties and alliances	Popular vote			Councillors	
Parties and alliances	Votes	%	±pp	Total	+/−
Spanish Socialist Workers' Party (PSOE)	7,224,242	38.34	+1.26	**25,260**	+2,019
People's Party (PP)	4,843,733	25.71	+3.16	**19,543**	+1,674
People's Party (PP)^{1}	4,775,051	25.34	+3.01	19,298	+1,563
Navarrese People's Union (UPN)	68,682	0.36	+0.14	245	+111
United Left (IU)	1,605,285	8.52	+0.28	**2,644**	−37
United Left (IU)	1,500,978	7.97	+0.19	2,531	−66
Canarian Initiative (ICAN)^{2}	78,119	0.41	−0.05	83	−1
Canarian Nationalist Assembly (ACN)	26,188	0.14	New	30	+30
Convergence and Union (CiU)	915,464	4.86	−0.29	**4,360**	−13
Democratic and Social Centre (CDS)	731,331	3.88	−5.89	**2,939**	−3,033
Andalusian Party (PA)	342,927	1.82	+0.68	**540**	+246
Basque Nationalist Party (EAJ/PNV)	299,840	1.59	+0.35	**993**	+174
Popular Unity (HB)	199,090	1.06	−0.17	**701**	+32
Valencian Union (UV)	187,385	0.99	+0.23	**335**	+120
Canarian Independent Groups (AIC)	142,561	0.76	+0.06	**284**	+43
Tenerife Group of Independents (ATI)	110,274	0.59	−0.03	178	+5
Lanzarote Independents Party (PIL)^{3}	11,078	0.06	+0.05	45	+29
La Palma Group of Independents (API)	9,821	0.05	−0.01	44	−2
Independents of Gran Canaria (IGC)	6,599	0.04	New	5	+5
Independents of Fuerteventura (IF)	2,593	0.01	±0.00	9	+3
Independent Realejeran Group (ARI)	2,196	0.01	New	3	+3
Basque Solidarity (EA)	131,384	0.70	−0.36	**393**	−104
Aragonese Party (PAR)	128,025	0.68	+0.02	**1,221**	+325
Galician Nationalist Bloc (BNG)	107,932	0.57	+0.26	**241**	+102
Republican Left of Catalonia (ERC)	92,003	0.49	+0.10	**228**	+40
The Greens (LV)	82,361	0.44	+0.34	**5**	+3
Union for the Progress of Cantabria (UPCA)	71,683	0.38	New	**285**	+285
Basque Country Left (EE)	71,382	0.38	−0.17	**105**	−52
Valencian People's Union (UPV)	54,951	0.29	+0.14	**92**	+27
Galician Nationalist Convergence (CG–CdG)^{4}	52,196	0.28	−0.48	**137**	−470
Galician Socialist Party–Galician Left (PSG–EG)	39,116	0.21	−0.08	**46**	−14
Left Proposal–Party of the Communists of Catalonia (PEC–PCC)	30,802	0.16	New	**25**	+25
The Greens Ecologist–Humanist List (PH–LE–FV)	25,136	0.13	−0.02	0	±0
The Greens Ecologist–Humanist List (LVLE–H)^{5}	16,408	0.09	−0.04	0	±0
The Ecologists (LE)	8,495	0.05	New	0	±0
Humanist Party (PH)	233	0.00	New	0	±0
Ruiz-Mateos Group (ARM)	23,404	0.12	New	0	±0
Independent Solution (SI)^{6}	21,951	0.12	−0.01	**61**	−9
Alavese Unity (UA)	21,269	0.11	New	**39**	+39
Socialist Party of Mallorca–Nationalists of Mallorca (PSM–NM)	20,981	0.11	+0.05	**54**	+29
Liberal Independent Group (GIL)	20,531	0.11	New	**19**	+19
Regionalist Party of Cantabria (PRC)	18,966	0.10	−0.04	**69**	−31
Regional Electoral Coalition (PCAN–PRM)^{7}	16,180	0.09	−0.05	**12**	+2
Gijonese Unity (UGJ)	13,127	0.07	New	**3**	+3
Workers' Socialist Party (PST)	11,366	0.06	+0.05	0	±0
Asturian Coalition (PAS–UNA)^{8}	10,891	0.06	+0.04	**6**	+4
Spanish Phalanx of the CNSO (FE–JONS)	10,829	0.06	−0.04	**11**	+5
Aragonese Union (CHA)	10,196	0.05	+0.03	**16**	+14
Independent Union of Majorca–Independents of Majorca (UIM–IM)	10,159	0.05	New	**21**	+21
Green Union (UVE–LVA)	9,943	0.05	New	0	±0
Leonese People's Union (UPL)	9,595	0.05	+0.03	**28**	+15
Progress and Future of Ceuta (PFC)	9,420	0.05	New	**11**	+11
Granadan Unity (UG)	9,333	0.05	New	**53**	+53
Socialist Democracy (DS)	8,747	0.05	New	**4**	+4
People's Palentine Group (APP)	6,234	0.03	New	**2**	+2
Majorera Assembly (AM)	4,959	0.03	±0.00	**21**	−2
Independents of Ibiza and Formentera Federation (FIEF)	2,048	0.01	New	**6**	+6
Independent Herrenian Group (AHI)	1,452	0.01	±0.00	**8**	−1
Others (lists at <0.05% not securing any provincial or island seat)	978,929	5.20	—	**5,487**	−845
Blank ballots	212,201	1.13	+0.02		
**Total**	**18,841,540**	**100.00**		**66,308**	**+731**
Valid votes	18,841,540	99.30	+0.56		
Invalid votes	131,974	0.70	−0.56		
**Votes cast / turnout**	**18,973,514**	**62.78**	**−6.64**		
Abstentions	11,249,870	37.22	+6.64		
**Registered voters**	**30,223,384**				
Sources
Footnotes: ^{1} People's Party results are compared to the combined totals of People's Alliance, People's Democratic Party, Independent Solution in Burgos, Majorcan Union and Liberal Party in the 1987 elections.; ^{2} Canarian Initiative results are compared to the combined totals of United Left (in the Canary Islands) and Canarian Assembly–Canarian Nationalist Left in the 1987 elections.; ^{3} Lanzarote Independents Party results are compared to Lanzarote Independents Group totals in the 1987 elections.; ^{4} Galician Nationalist Convergence results are compared to Galician Progressive Coalition totals in the 1987 elections.; ^{5} The Greens Ecologist–Humanist List results are compared to Humanist Platform totals in the 1987 elections.; ^{6} Independent Solution does not include results in Burgos.; ^{7} Regional Electoral Coalition results are compared to Cantonal Party totals in the 1987 elections.; ^{8} Asturian Coalition results are compared to Asturianist Party totals in the 1987 elections.

Popular vote
PSOE	38.34%
PP	25.71%
IU	8.52%
CiU	4.86%
CDS	3.88%
PA	1.82%
EAJ/PNV	1.59%
HB	1.06%
UV	0.99%
AIC	0.76%
EA	0.70%
PAR	0.68%
BNG	0.57%
Others	9.39%
Blank ballots	1.13%

==== City control ====
The following table lists party control in provincial capitals (highlighted in bold), as well as in municipalities above 75,000. Gains for a party are highlighted in that party's colour.

Municipality	Population	Previous control	New control
**A Coruña**	256,579	Spanish Socialist Workers' Party (PSOE)	Spanish Socialist Workers' Party (PSOE)
**Albacete**	129,002	Spanish Socialist Workers' Party (PSOE)	Spanish Socialist Workers' Party (PSOE)
Alcalá de Henares	155,548	Spanish Socialist Workers' Party (PSOE)	Spanish Socialist Workers' Party (PSOE)
Alcobendas	78,295	Spanish Socialist Workers' Party (PSOE)	Spanish Socialist Workers' Party (PSOE)
Alcorcón	141,080	Spanish Socialist Workers' Party (PSOE)	Spanish Socialist Workers' Party (PSOE)
Algeciras	102,079	Spanish Socialist Workers' Party (PSOE)	Spanish Socialist Workers' Party (PSOE)
**Alicante**	267,485	Spanish Socialist Workers' Party (PSOE)	Spanish Socialist Workers' Party (PSOE)
**Almería**	161,566	Spanish Socialist Workers' Party (PSOE)	Spanish Socialist Workers' Party (PSOE)
**Ávila**	46,992	Democratic and Social Centre (CDS)	People's Party (PP)
Avilés	88,429	Spanish Socialist Workers' Party (PSOE)	Spanish Socialist Workers' Party (PSOE)
**Badajoz**	126,781	Spanish Socialist Workers' Party (PSOE)	Spanish Socialist Workers' Party (PSOE)
Badalona	225,207	Socialists' Party of Catalonia (PSC–PSOE)	Socialists' Party of Catalonia (PSC–PSOE)
Barakaldo	108,588	Spanish Socialist Workers' Party (PSOE)	Spanish Socialist Workers' Party (PSOE)
**Barcelona**	1,707,286	Socialists' Party of Catalonia (PSC–PSOE)	Socialists' Party of Catalonia (PSC–PSOE)
**Bilbao**	383,798	Basque Nationalist Party (EAJ/PNV)	Basque Nationalist Party (EAJ/PNV)
**Burgos**	163,507	People's Party (PP)	People's Party (PP)
**Cáceres**	73,915	Spanish Socialist Workers' Party (PSOE)	Spanish Socialist Workers' Party (PSOE)
**Cádiz**	156,903	Spanish Socialist Workers' Party (PSOE)	Spanish Socialist Workers' Party (PSOE)
Cartagena	175,966	Cantonal Party (PCAN)	Spanish Socialist Workers' Party (PSOE)
**Castellón de la Plana**	135,863	Spanish Socialist Workers' Party (PSOE)	People's Party (PP)
**Ciudad Real**	58,175	Spanish Socialist Workers' Party (PSOE)	Spanish Socialist Workers' Party (PSOE)
**Córdoba**	307,275	United Left (IU)	United Left (IU)
Cornellà de Llobregat	86,287	Socialists' Party of Catalonia (PSC–PSOE)	Socialists' Party of Catalonia (PSC–PSOE)
**Cuenca**	43,209	People's Party (PP)	Spanish Socialist Workers' Party (PSOE)
**Donostia-San Sebastián**	183,944	Basque Solidarity (EA)	Spanish Socialist Workers' Party (PSOE)
Dos Hermanas	72,717 (Note: Reached 75,000 in 1991.)	Spanish Socialist Workers' Party (PSOE)	Spanish Socialist Workers' Party (PSOE)
Elche	184,912	Spanish Socialist Workers' Party (PSOE)	Spanish Socialist Workers' Party (PSOE)
Ferrol	86,272	Spanish Socialist Workers' Party (PSOE)	People's Party (PP) (PSOE in 1991)
Fuenlabrada	141,496	Spanish Socialist Workers' Party (PSOE)	Spanish Socialist Workers' Party (PSOE)
Getafe	139,068	Spanish Socialist Workers' Party (PSOE)	Spanish Socialist Workers' Party (PSOE)
Getxo	81,795	Basque Nationalist Party (EAJ/PNV)	Basque Nationalist Party (EAJ/PNV)
Gijón	264,948	Spanish Socialist Workers' Party (PSOE)	Spanish Socialist Workers' Party (PSOE)
**Girona**	70,893	Socialists' Party of Catalonia (PSC–PSOE)	Socialists' Party of Catalonia (PSC–PSOE)
**Granada**	268,674	Spanish Socialist Workers' Party (PSOE)	Spanish Socialist Workers' Party (PSOE)
**Guadalajara**	63,581	Spanish Socialist Workers' Party (PSOE)	United Left (IU) (PP in 1992)
**Huelva**	141,002	Spanish Socialist Workers' Party (PSOE)	Spanish Socialist Workers' Party (PSOE)
**Huesca**	42,805	Spanish Socialist Workers' Party (PSOE)	Spanish Socialist Workers' Party (PSOE)
**Jaén**	109,338	People's Party (PP)	Spanish Socialist Workers' Party (PSOE)
Jerez de la Frontera	186,812	Andalusian Party (PA)	Andalusian Party (PA) (PAP in 1993)
L'Hospitalet de Llobregat	276,198	Socialists' Party of Catalonia (PSC–PSOE)	Socialists' Party of Catalonia (PSC–PSOE)
**Las Palmas de Gran Canaria**	373,846	Spanish Socialist Workers' Party (PSOE)	Democratic and Social Centre (CDS) (PSOE in 1993)
Leganés	172,729	Spanish Socialist Workers' Party (PSOE)	Spanish Socialist Workers' Party (PSOE)
**León**	137,758	People's Party (PP)	People's Party (PP)
**Lleida**	111,825	Socialists' Party of Catalonia (PSC–PSOE)	Socialists' Party of Catalonia (PSC–PSOE)
**Logroño**	121,911	Spanish Socialist Workers' Party (PSOE)	Spanish Socialist Workers' Party (PSOE)
**Lugo**	81,493	Galician Coalition (CG)	People's Party (PP)
**Madrid**	3,120,732	Democratic and Social Centre (CDS)	People's Party (PP)
**Málaga**	560,495	Spanish Socialist Workers' Party (PSOE)	Spanish Socialist Workers' Party (PSOE)
Marbella	81,876	Spanish Socialist Workers' Party (PSOE)	Liberal Independent Group (GIL)
Mataró	101,882	Socialists' Party of Catalonia (PSC–PSOE)	Socialists' Party of Catalonia (PSC–PSOE)
Móstoles	189,707	Spanish Socialist Workers' Party (PSOE)	Spanish Socialist Workers' Party (PSOE)
**Murcia**	322,911	Spanish Socialist Workers' Party (PSOE)	Spanish Socialist Workers' Party (PSOE)
**Ourense**	109,283	Independents of Galicia (IG)	Spanish Socialist Workers' Party (PSOE)
**Oviedo**	194,637	Spanish Socialist Workers' Party (PSOE)	People's Party (PP)
**Palencia**	77,464	People's Party (PP)	Spanish Socialist Workers' Party (PSOE)
**Palma de Mallorca** (Note: Renamed from Palma in March 1991.)	325,120	Spanish Socialist Workers' Party (PSOE)	People's Party (PP)
**Pamplona**	183,525	Navarrese People's Union (UPN)	Navarrese People's Union (UPN)
**Pontevedra**	70,356	Independents of Galicia (IG)	People's Party (PP)
Reus	86,407	Socialists' Party of Catalonia (PSC–PSOE)	Socialists' Party of Catalonia (PSC–PSOE)
Sabadell	192,142	Initiative for Catalonia (IC)	Initiative for Catalonia (IC)
**Salamanca**	162,037	People's Party (PP)	Spanish Socialist Workers' Party (PSOE)
San Cristóbal de La Laguna (Note: Renamed from La Laguna in March 1991.)	118,548	Canarian Independent Groups (AIC)	Spanish Socialist Workers' Party (PSOE) (CC in 1993)
San Fernando	83,923	Andalusian Party (PA)	Andalusian Party (PA)
Sant Boi de Llobregat	78,882	Socialists' Party of Catalonia (PSC–PSOE)	Socialists' Party of Catalonia (PSC–PSOE)
Santa Coloma de Gramenet	135,486	Initiative for Catalonia (IC)	Socialists' Party of Catalonia (PSC–PSOE)
**Santa Cruz de Tenerife**	222,892	Canarian Independent Groups (AIC)	Canarian Independent Groups (AIC)
**Santander**	194,221	People's Party (PP)	People's Party (PP)
Santiago de Compostela	91,419	Spanish Socialist Workers' Party (PSOE)	Spanish Socialist Workers' Party (PSOE)
**Segovia**	55,188	Democratic and Social Centre (CDS)	People's Party (PP)
**Seville**	678,218	Spanish Socialist Workers' Party (PSOE)	Andalusian Party (PA)
**Soria**	32,609	People's Party (PP)	People's Party (PP)
**Tarragona**	112,360	Convergence and Union (CiU)	Convergence and Union (CiU)
Telde	78,978	United Left (IU)	Nationalist Canarian Assembly (ACN)
Terrassa	161,682	Socialists' Party of Catalonia (PSC–PSOE)	Socialists' Party of Catalonia (PSC–PSOE)
**Teruel**	28,488	Spanish Socialist Workers' Party (PSOE)	Aragonese Party (PAR)
**Toledo**	60,671	People's Party (PP)	Spanish Socialist Workers' Party (PSOE)
Torrejón de Ardoz	86,678	Spanish Socialist Workers' Party (PSOE)	Spanish Socialist Workers' Party (PSOE)
**Valencia**	758,738	Spanish Socialist Workers' Party (PSOE)	People's Party (PP)
**Valladolid**	333,680	Spanish Socialist Workers' Party (PSOE)	Spanish Socialist Workers' Party (PSOE)
Vigo	279,986	Spanish Socialist Workers' Party (PSOE)	Spanish Socialist Workers' Party (PSOE)
**Vitoria-Gasteiz**	209,506	Basque Nationalist Party (EAJ/PNV)	Basque Nationalist Party (EAJ/PNV)
**Zamora**	63,436	People's Party (PP)	Spanish Socialist Workers' Party (PSOE)
**Zaragoza**	592,686	Spanish Socialist Workers' Party (PSOE)	Spanish Socialist Workers' Party (PSOE)

=== Provincial and island ===
==== Summary ====
← Summary of the 26 May 1991 Spanish provincial and island election results →
Parties and alliances	Seats				
Parties and alliances	PD	IC	FD	Total	+/−
Spanish Socialist Workers' Party (PSOE)	524	72	32	**628**	+40
People's Party (PP)^{1}	337	45	9	**391**	+38
Convergence and Union (CiU)	68	—	—	**68**	+1
United Left (IU)	36	10	0	**48**	−2
United Left (IU)	36	2	0	38	−4
Canarian Initiative (ICAN)^{2}	—	10	—	10	+2
Basque Nationalist Party (EAJ/PNV)	—	—	47	**47**	+15
Canarian Independent Groups (AIC)	—	35	—	**35**	+11
Tenerife Group of Independents (ATI)	—	13	—	13	±0
Lanzarote Independents Party (PIL)^{3}	—	12	—	12	+10
La Palma Group of Independents (API)	—	7	—	7	+2
Independents of Fuerteventura (IF)	—	3	—	3	−1
Democratic and Social Centre (CDS)	14	18	0	**32**	−84
Popular Unity (HB)	—	—	27	**27**	−5
Basque Solidarity (EA)	—	—	19	**19**	−16
Andalusian Party (PA)	15	—	—	**15**	+6
Aragonese Party (PAR)	15	—	—	**15**	+2
Alavese Unity (UA)	—	—	11	**11**	+11
Galician Nationalist Convergence (CG–CdG)^{4}	10	—	—	**10**	−3
Basque Country Left (EE)	—	—	8	**8**	−4
Majorera Assembly (AM)	—	7	—	**7**	±0
Valencian Union (UV)	4	—	—	**4**	+1
Independent Herrenian Group (AHI)	—	4	—	**4**	−4
Galician Nationalist Bloc (BNG)	3	—	—	**3**	+2
Socialist Party of Mallorca–Nationalists of Majorca (PSM–NM)	—	3	—	**3**	+1
Liberal Independent Group (GIL)	2	—	—	**2**	+2
Valencian People's Union (UPV)	1	—	—	**1**	+1
Leonese People's Union (UPL)	1	—	—	**1**	+1
Independent Union of Majorca–Independents of Majorca (UIM–IM)	—	1	—	**1**	+1
People's Palentine Group (APP)	1	—	—	**1**	+1
Independents of Ibiza and Formentera Federation (FIEF)	—	1	—	**1**	+1
Galician Socialist Party–Galician Left (PSG–EG)	0	—	—	0	−1
Workers' Party of Spain–Communist Unity (PTE–UC)	n/a	n/a	n/a	0	−1
Independents of Galicia (IG)	n/a	n/a	n/a	0	−1
Galician Nationalist Party (PNG)	n/a	n/a	n/a	0	−1
Independent Group of Ciudad Real (AICR)	n/a	n/a	n/a	0	−1
Centre Canarian Union (UCC)	n/a	n/a	n/a	0	−1
Free Independents (IL)	n/a	n/a	n/a	0	−1
Independents (INDEP)	1	0	0	**1**	−4
**Total**	**1,032**	**198**	**153**	**1,383**	**+6**
Sources
Footnotes: ^{1} People's Party results are compared to the combined totals of People's Alliance, People's Democratic Party, Independent Solution in Burgos and Majorcan Union in the 1987 elections.; ^{2} Canarian Initiative results are compared to the combined totals of United Left (in the Canary Islands) and Canarian Assembly–Canarian Nationalist Left in the 1987 elections.; ^{3} Lanzarote Independents Party results are compared to Lanzarote Independents Group totals in the 1987 elections.; ^{4} Galician Nationalist Convergence results are compared to Galician Progressive Coalition totals in the 1987 elections.

==== Indirectly-elected ====
The following table lists party control in the indirectly-elected provincial deputations. Gains for a party are highlighted in that party's colour.

Province	Population	Previous control	New control
Albacete	350,299	Spanish Socialist Workers' Party (PSOE)	Spanish Socialist Workers' Party (PSOE)
Alicante	1,288,262	Spanish Socialist Workers' Party (PSOE)	Spanish Socialist Workers' Party (PSOE)
Almería	468,972	Spanish Socialist Workers' Party (PSOE)	Spanish Socialist Workers' Party (PSOE)
Ávila	182,678	Democratic and Social Centre (CDS)	Democratic and Social Centre (CDS) (PP in 1993)
Badajoz	676,936	Spanish Socialist Workers' Party (PSOE)	Spanish Socialist Workers' Party (PSOE)
Barcelona	4,738,354	Socialists' Party of Catalonia (PSC–PSOE)	Socialists' Party of Catalonia (PSC–PSOE)
Burgos	362,211	People's Party (PP)	People's Party (PP)
Cáceres	425,383	Spanish Socialist Workers' Party (PSOE)	Spanish Socialist Workers' Party (PSOE)
Cádiz	1,090,628	Spanish Socialist Workers' Party (PSOE)	Spanish Socialist Workers' Party (PSOE)
Castellón	453,909	Spanish Socialist Workers' Party (PSOE)	Spanish Socialist Workers' Party (PSOE)
Ciudad Real	489,170	Spanish Socialist Workers' Party (PSOE)	Spanish Socialist Workers' Party (PSOE)
Córdoba	769,545	Spanish Socialist Workers' Party (PSOE)	Spanish Socialist Workers' Party (PSOE)
Cuenca	211,987	Spanish Socialist Workers' Party (PSOE)	Spanish Socialist Workers' Party (PSOE)
Gerona	521,455	Convergence and Union (CiU)	Convergence and Union (CiU)
Granada	816,642	Spanish Socialist Workers' Party (PSOE)	Spanish Socialist Workers' Party (PSOE)
Guadalajara	148,961	People's Party (PP)	People's Party (PP)
Huelva	451,522	Spanish Socialist Workers' Party (PSOE)	Spanish Socialist Workers' Party (PSOE)
Huesca	210,719	Spanish Socialist Workers' Party (PSOE)	Spanish Socialist Workers' Party (PSOE)
Jaén	662,093	Spanish Socialist Workers' Party (PSOE)	Spanish Socialist Workers' Party (PSOE)
La Coruña	1,142,573	Spanish Socialist Workers' Party (PSOE)	Spanish Socialist Workers' Party (PSOE)
León	536,118	Spanish Socialist Workers' Party (PSOE)	Spanish Socialist Workers' Party (PSOE)
Lérida	356,939	Convergence and Union (CiU)	Convergence and Union (CiU)
Lugo	408,535	People's Party (PP)	People's Party (PP)
Málaga	1,224,146	Spanish Socialist Workers' Party (PSOE)	Spanish Socialist Workers' Party (PSOE)
Orense	435,579	Centrists of Galicia (CdG)	Centrists of Galicia (CdG)
Palencia	189,680	People's Party (PP)	People's Party (PP)
Pontevedra	927,827	People's Party (PP)	People's Party (PP)
Salamanca	368,060	Democratic and Social Centre (CDS)	Independent (INDEP)
Segovia	151,208	Spanish Socialist Workers' Party (PSOE)	People's Party (PP)
Seville	1,616,512	Spanish Socialist Workers' Party (PSOE)	Spanish Socialist Workers' Party (PSOE)
Soria	97,268	People's Party (PP)	People's Party (PP)
Tarragona	548,890	Convergence and Union (CiU)	Convergence and Union (CiU)
Teruel	148,198	Spanish Socialist Workers' Party (PSOE)	People's Party (PP)
Toledo	494,727	People's Party (PP)	Spanish Socialist Workers' Party (PSOE)
Valencia	2,160,258	Spanish Socialist Workers' Party (PSOE)	Spanish Socialist Workers' Party (PSOE)
Valladolid	500,570	People's Party (PP)	Spanish Socialist Workers' Party (PSOE) (PP in 1993)
Zamora	221,896	People's Party (PP)	People's Party (PP)
Zaragoza	842,427	Spanish Socialist Workers' Party (PSOE)	Spanish Socialist Workers' Party (PSOE)

==== Island councils ====
The following table lists party control in the island councils. Gains for a party are highlighted in that party's colour.

Island	Population	Previous control	New control
El Hierro	7,705	Independent Herrenian Group (AHI)	Spanish Socialist Workers' Party (PSOE)
Fuerteventura	40,012	Majorera Assembly (AM)	Majorera Assembly (AM)
Gran Canaria	704,757	Spanish Socialist Workers' Party (PSOE)	Canarian Initiative (ICAN)
Ibiza–Formentera	85,740	People's Party (PP)	People's Party (PP)
La Gomera	17,485	Spanish Socialist Workers' Party (PSOE)	Spanish Socialist Workers' Party (PSOE)
La Palma	82,131	People's Party (PP)	La Palma Group of Independents (API) (PSOE in 1993)
Lanzarote	74,007	Democratic and Social Centre (CDS)	Lanzarote Independents Party (PIL) (PSOE in 1994)
Mallorca	613,831	People's Party (PP)	People's Party (PP)
Menorca	68,347	Spanish Socialist Workers' Party (PSOE)	Spanish Socialist Workers' Party (PSOE) (PP in 1991)
Tenerife	663,306	Tenerife Group of Independents (ATI)	Tenerife Group of Independents (ATI)

==== Foral deputations ====
The following table lists party control in the foral deputations. Gains for a party are highlighted in that party's colour.

Province	Population	Previous control	New control
Álava	277,734	Spanish Socialist Workers' Party (PSOE)	Basque Nationalist Party (EAJ/PNV)
Biscay	1,184,049	Basque Nationalist Party (EAJ/PNV)	Basque Nationalist Party (EAJ/PNV)
Guipúzcoa	697,918	Basque Solidarity (EA)	Basque Nationalist Party (EAJ/PNV)

== Bibliography ==
- Constitución Española (Constitution). Official State Gazette (in Spanish). 27 December 1978 [version as of 29 December 1978]. BOE-A-1978-31229.
- Ley Orgánica 10/1982, de 10 de agosto, de Estatuto de Autonomía de Canarias (Organic Law 10/1982). Official State Gazette (in Spanish). 10 August 1982 [version as of 16 August 1982]. BOE-A-1982-20821.
- Ley Orgánica 2/1983, de 25 de febrero, de Estatuto de Autonomía para las islas Baleares (Organic Law 2/1983). Official State Gazette (in Spanish). 1 March 1983. BOE-A-1983-6316.
- Ley 27/1983, de 25 de noviembre, de Relaciones entre las Instituciones Comunes de la Comunidad Autónoma y los Órganos Forales de sus Territorios Históricos (Law 27/1983). Official State Gazette (in Spanish). 25 November 1983 [version as of 10 April 1987]. BOE-A-2012-5193.
- Ley 7/1985, de 2 de abril, Reguladora de las Bases del Régimen Local (Law 7/1985). Official State Gazette (in Spanish). 2 April 1985 [version as of 27 March 1991]. BOE-A-1985-5392.
- Ley Orgánica 5/1985, de 19 de junio, del Régimen Electoral General (Organic Law 5/1985). Official State Gazette (in Spanish). 19 June 1985 [version as of 14 March 1991]. BOE-A-1985-11672.
- Ley 8/1986, de 26 de noviembre, Electoral de la Comunidad Autónoma de las Islas Baleares (Law 8/1986). Official State Gazette (in Spanish). 26 November 1986 [version as of 20 December 1986]. BOE-A-1987-2903.
- Ley 1/1987, de 27 de marzo, de Elecciones para las Juntas Generales de los Territorios Históricos de Araba, Bizkaia y Gipuzkoa (Law 1/1987). Official State Gazette (in Spanish). 27 March 1987 [version as of 10 April 1987]. BOE-A-2012-3948.
- Ley 5/1989, de 13 de abril, de Consells Insulares (Law 5/1989). Official State Gazette (in Spanish). 13 April 1989. BOE-A-1989-16895.
- Ley 14/1990, de 26 de julio, de Régimen Jurídico de las Administraciones Públicas de Canarias (Law 14/1990). Official State Gazette (in Spanish). 26 July 1990. BOE-A-1990-23140.
- Real Decreto 391/1991, de 1 de abril, de convocatoria de elecciones locales (Royal Decree 391/1991). Official State Gazette (in Spanish). 1 April 1991. BOE-A-1991-7959.
- Real Decreto 1334/1991, de 9 de septiembre, por el que se convocan elecciones locales parciales (Royal Decree 1334/1991). Official State Gazette (in Spanish). 9 September 1991. BOE-A-1991-22920.
