= 1995 Spanish local elections in the Canary Islands =

This article presents the results breakdown of the local elections held in the Canary Islands on 28 May 1995. The following tables show detailed results in the autonomous community's most populous municipalities, sorted alphabetically.

== City control ==
The following table lists party control in the most populous municipalities, including provincial capitals (highlighted in bold). Gains for a party are highlighted in that party's colour.

| Municipality | Population | Previous control | New control |
|---|---|---|---|
| Arona | 27,909 | Spanish Socialist Workers' Party (PSOE) | Democratic and Social Centre (CDS) (ATI–MEI in 1997) |
| **Las Palmas de Gran Canaria** | 371,787 | Spanish Socialist Workers' Party (PSOE) | People's Party (PP) |
| San Cristóbal de La Laguna | 125,183 | Canarian Coalition (CC) | Canarian Coalition (CC) |
| **Santa Cruz de Tenerife** | 203,929 | Canarian Coalition (CC) | Canarian Coalition (CC) |
| Telde | 84,078 | Canarian Coalition (CC) | Canarian Coalition (CC) |

== Municipalities ==
=== Arona ===
Population: 27,909

← Summary of the 28 May 1995 City Council of Arona election results →
| Parties and alliances | Popular vote | | | Seats | |
| Parties and alliances | Votes | % | ±pp | Total | +/− |
|---|---|---|---|---|---|
| Spanish Socialist Workers' Party (PSOE) | 4,322 | 40.00 | −1.75 | **9** | ±0 |
| Tenerife Group of Independents–Independent Electoral Movement (ATI–MEI) | 2,324 | 21.51 | −5.77 | **5** | −1 |
| People's Party (PP) | 1,801 | 16.67 | +7.84 | **4** | +2 |
| Democratic and Social Centre–Centrist Union (CDS–UC) | 1,086 | 10.05 | −6.17 | **2** | −1 |
| Nationalist Canarian Initiative (ICAN) | 614 | 5.68 | +0.19 | **1** | ±0 |
| Canarian United Left (IUC) | 286 | 2.65 | New | 0 | ±0 |
| Nationalist Canarian Centre (CCN) | 144 | 1.33 | New | 0 | ±0 |
| Tenerife Independent Family Groups (AFIT) | 78 | 0.72 | New | 0 | ±0 |
| Tenerife Assembly (ATF) | 65 | 0.60 | New | 0 | ±0 |
| Blank ballots | 84 | 0.78 | +0.35 | | |
| **Total** | **10,804** | | | **21** | **±0** |
| Valid votes | 10,804 | 99.64 | +0.49 | | |
| Invalid votes | 39 | 0.36 | −0.49 | | |
| **Votes cast / turnout** | **10,843** | **55.14** | **+2.79** | | |
| Abstentions | 8,821 | 44.86 | −2.79 | | |
| **Registered voters** | **19,664** | | | | |

=== Las Palmas de Gran Canaria ===
Population: 371,787

← Summary of the 28 May 1995 City Council of Las Palmas de Gran Canaria election results →
| Parties and alliances | Popular vote | | | Seats | |
| Parties and alliances | Votes | % | ±pp | Total | +/− |
|---|---|---|---|---|---|
| People's Party (PP) | 83,502 | 48.36 | +26.60 | **15** | +8 |
| Spanish Socialist Workers' Party (PSOE) | 31,209 | 18.08 | −10.76 | **5** | −5 |
| Canarian Coalition (CC)^{1} | 28,192 | 16.33 | −2.81 | **5** | ±0 |
| Canarian United Left (IUC) | 11,440 | 6.63 | New | **2** | +2 |
| Party of Gran Canaria (PGC) | 10,937 | 6.33 | New | **2** | +2 |
| Coalition for Gran Canaria (CGC) | 3,925 | 2.27 | New | 0 | ±0 |
| Democratic and Social Centre–Centrist Union (CDS–UC) | 723 | 0.42 | −22.54 | 0 | −7 |
| Humanist Platform (PH)^{2} | 594 | 0.34 | −0.18 | 0 | ±0 |
| Blank ballots | 2,134 | 1.24 | +0.16 | | |
| **Total** | **172,656** | | | **29** | **±0** |
| Valid votes | 172,656 | 99.33 | +0.17 | | |
| Invalid votes | 1,165 | 0.67 | −0.17 | | |
| **Votes cast / turnout** | **173,821** | **60.21** | **+6.64** | | |
| Abstentions | 114,891 | 39.79 | −6.64 | | |
| **Registered voters** | **288,712** | | | | |
Sources
Footnotes: ^{1} Canarian Coalition results are compared to the combined totals of Canarian Initiative and Canarian Nationalist Party in the 1991 election.; ^{2} Humanist Platform results are compared to The Greens Ecologist–Humanist List totals in the 1991 election.

=== San Cristóbal de La Laguna ===
Population: 125,183

← Summary of the 28 May 1995 City Council of San Cristóbal de La Laguna election results →
| Parties and alliances | Popular vote | | | Seats | |
| Parties and alliances | Votes | % | ±pp | Total | +/− |
|---|---|---|---|---|---|
| Canarian Coalition (CC)^{1} | 19,055 | 35.57 | −15.81 | **11** | −3 |
| People's Party (PP) | 15,285 | 28.53 | +21.12 | **8** | +6 |
| Spanish Socialist Workers' Party (PSOE) | 13,678 | 25.53 | −3.10 | **7** | −1 |
| Canarian United Left (IUC) | 3,193 | 5.96 | New | **1** | +1 |
| Tenerife Assembly (ATF) | 678 | 1.27 | New | 0 | ±0 |
| Green Left of the Canary Islands (Izegzawen) | 501 | 0.94 | New | 0 | ±0 |
| Democratic and Social Centre–Centrist Union (CDS–UC) | 201 | 0.38 | New | 0 | ±0 |
| Humanist Platform (PH) | 137 | 0.26 | New | 0 | ±0 |
| Independent Municipal Platform (PMI) | n/a | n/a | −9.91 | 0 | −3 |
| Blank ballots | 839 | 1.57 | +0.53 | | |
| **Total** | **53,567** | | | **27** | **±0** |
| Valid votes | 53,567 | 98.85 | +0.01 | | |
| Invalid votes | 621 | 1.15 | −0.01 | | |
| **Votes cast / turnout** | **54,188** | **56.85** | **+1.29** | | |
| Abstentions | 41,134 | 43.15 | −1.29 | | |
| **Registered voters** | **95,322** | | | | |
Sources
Footnotes: ^{1} Canarian Coalition results are compared to the combined totals of Tenerife Group of Independents and Canarian Initiative in the 1991 election.

=== Santa Cruz de Tenerife ===
Population: 203,929

← Summary of the 28 May 1995 City Council of Santa Cruz de Tenerife election results →
| Parties and alliances | Popular vote | | | Seats | |
| Parties and alliances | Votes | % | ±pp | Total | +/− |
|---|---|---|---|---|---|
| Canarian Coalition (CC)^{1} | 34,879 | 39.17 | −23.90 | **11** | −7 |
| People's Party (PP) | 30,149 | 33.86 | +23.26 | **10** | +7 |
| Spanish Socialist Workers' Party (PSOE) | 13,744 | 15.44 | −4.57 | **4** | −2 |
| Canarian United Left (IUC) | 6,766 | 7.60 | New | **2** | +2 |
| Tenerife Assembly (ATF) | 827 | 0.93 | New | 0 | ±0 |
| Democratic and Social Centre–Centrist Union (CDS–UC) | 610 | 0.69 | −1.91 | 0 | ±0 |
| Tenerife Independent Family Groups (AFIT) | 430 | 0.48 | New | 0 | ±0 |
| Party of The People (LG) | 295 | 0.33 | −0.25 | 0 | ±0 |
| Blank ballots | 1,337 | 1.50 | +0.19 | | |
| **Total** | **89,037** | | | **27** | **±0** |
| Valid votes | 89,037 | 99.32 | +0.13 | | |
| Invalid votes | 614 | 0.68 | −0.13 | | |
| **Votes cast / turnout** | **89,651** | **50.23** | **+5.27** | | |
| Abstentions | 88,816 | 49.77 | −5.27 | | |
| **Registered voters** | **178,467** | | | | |
Sources
Footnotes: ^{1} Canarian Coalition results are compared to the combined totals of Tenerife Group of Independents, Canarian Initiative and Canarian Nationalist Party in the 1991 election.

=== Telde ===
Population: 84,078

← Summary of the 28 May 1995 City Council of Telde election results →
| Parties and alliances | Popular vote | | | Seats | |
| Parties and alliances | Votes | % | ±pp | Total | +/− |
|---|---|---|---|---|---|
| Canarian Coalition (CC)^{1} | 20,872 | 50.71 | −7.40 | **15** | ±0 |
| People's Party (PP) | 10,578 | 25.70 | +13.67 | **8** | +5 |
| Coalition for Gran Canaria (CGC) | 3,104 | 7.54 | New | **2** | +2 |
| Spanish Socialist Workers' Party (PSOE) | 1,769 | 4.30 | −10.42 | 0 | −4 |
| Federal Group of Jinámar Valley (AFV) | 1,516 | 3.68 | New | 0 | ±0 |
| Canarian United Left (IUC) | 1,209 | 2.94 | New | 0 | ±0 |
| Party of Gran Canaria (PGC) | 862 | 2.09 | New | 0 | ±0 |
| Telde Independents Nationalist Group (ANITEL) | 579 | 1.41 | New | 0 | ±0 |
| Popular Front of the Canary Islands–Awañac (FREPIC–Awañac) | 252 | 0.61 | New | 0 | ±0 |
| Humanist Platform (PH)^{2} | 75 | 0.18 | −0.41 | 0 | ±0 |
| Democratic and Social Centre–Centrist Union (CDS–UC) | 59 | 0.14 | −13.11 | 0 | −3 |
| Blank ballots | 285 | 0.69 | +0.10 | | |
| **Total** | **41,160** | | | **25** | **±0** |
| Valid votes | 41,160 | 99.45 | +0.55 | | |
| Invalid votes | 229 | 0.55 | −0.55 | | |
| **Votes cast / turnout** | **41,389** | **67.00** | **+1.28** | | |
| Abstentions | 20,387 | 33.00 | −1.28 | | |
| **Registered voters** | **61,776** | | | | |
Sources
Footnotes: ^{1} Canarian Coalition results are compared to the combined totals of Nationalist Canarian Assembly and United Canarian Left in the 1991 election.; ^{2} Humanist Platform results are compared to The Greens Ecologist–Humanist List totals in the 1991 election.

== See also ==
- 1995 Canarian regional election
