= 1991 Spanish local elections in the Canary Islands =

This article presents the results breakdown of the local elections held in the Canary Islands on 26 May 1991. The following tables show detailed results in the autonomous community's most populous municipalities, sorted alphabetically.

== City control ==
The following table lists party control in the most populous municipalities, including provincial capitals (highlighted in bold). Gains for a party are highlighted in that party's colour.

Municipality	Population	Previous control	New control
Arona	25,018	Spanish Socialist Workers' Party (PSOE)	Spanish Socialist Workers' Party (PSOE)
**Las Palmas de Gran Canaria**	373,846	Spanish Socialist Workers' Party (PSOE)	Democratic and Social Centre (CDS) (PSOE in 1993)
San Cristóbal de La Laguna	118,548	Tenerife Group of Independents (ATI)	Spanish Socialist Workers' Party (PSOE) (ATI in 1993)
**Santa Cruz de Tenerife**	222,892	Tenerife Group of Independents (ATI)	Tenerife Group of Independents (ATI)
Telde	78,978	United Canarian Left (ICU)	Nationalist Canarian Assembly (ACN)

== Municipalities ==
=== Arona ===
Population: 25,018

← Summary of the 26 May 1991 City Council of Arona election results →
Parties and alliances	Popular vote			Seats	
Parties and alliances	Votes	%	±pp	Total	+/−
Spanish Socialist Workers' Party (PSOE)	3,661	41.75	−26.02	9	−4
Independent Electoral Movement (MEI)^{1}	2,392	27.28	+16.12	6	+4
Democratic and Social Centre (CDS)	1,422	16.22	+3.49	3	+1
People's Party (PP)^{2}	774	8.83	+4.45	2	+2
Canarian Initiative (ICAN)^{3}	481	5.49	+2.05	1	+1
Blank ballots	38	0.43	−0.10		
**Total**	**8,768**			21	**+4**
Valid votes	8,768	99.15	+0.07		
Invalid votes	75	0.85	−0.07		
**Votes cast / turnout**	**8,843**	**52.35**	**−14.47**		
Abstentions	8,049	47.65	+14.47		
**Registered voters**	**16,892**				
Sources
Footnotes: ^{1} Independent Electoral Movement results are compared to Tenerife Group of Independents totals in the 1987 election.; ^{2} People's Party results are compared to People's Alliance totals in the 1987 election.; ^{3} Canarian Initiative results are compared to United Canarian Left totals in the 1987 election.

=== Las Palmas de Gran Canaria ===
Population: 373,846

← Summary of the 26 May 1991 City Council of Las Palmas de Gran Canaria election results →
Parties and alliances	Popular vote			Seats	
Parties and alliances	Votes	%	±pp	Total	+/−
Spanish Socialist Workers' Party (PSOE)	42,179	28.84	+2.86	**10**	+1
Democratic and Social Centre (CDS)	33,571	22.96	−1.71	**7**	−2
People's Party (PP)^{1}	31,815	21.76	+1.95	**7**	+1
Canarian Initiative (ICAN)^{2}	24,437	16.71	−1.47	**5**	±0
Independents of Gran Canaria (IGC)	3,808	2.60	New	0	±0
Canarian Nationalist Party (PNC)	3,555	2.43	New	0	±0
The Greens (LV)	1,535	1.05	New	0	±0
Canarian Coalition for Independence (CI (FREPIC–Awañac))	876	0.60	New	0	±0
Left Platform (PCE (m–l)–CRPE)^{3}	845	0.58	+0.41	0	±0
The Greens Ecologist–Humanist List (LVLE–H)^{4}	761	0.52	+0.22	0	±0
Insular Group of Gran Canaria (AIGRANC)	527	0.36	−1.50	0	±0
Assembly (Tagoror)	472	0.32	+0.13	0	±0
Party of The People (LG)	282	0.19	New	0	±0
Blank ballots	1,579	1.08	+0.28		
**Total**	**146,242**			**29**	**±0**
Valid votes	146,242	99.16	+1.08		
Invalid votes	1,233	0.84	−1.08		
**Votes cast / turnout**	**147,475**	**53.57**	**−6.46**		
Abstentions	127,823	46.43	+6.46		
**Registered voters**	**275,298**				
Sources
Footnotes: ^{1} People's Party results are compared to the combined totals of People's Alliance and People's Democratic Party–Canarian Centrists in the 1987 election.; ^{2} Canarian Initiative results are compared to the combined totals of United Canarian Left and Canarian Assembly–Canarian Nationalist Left in the 1987 election.; ^{3} Left Platform results are compared to Republican Popular Unity totals in the 1987 election.; ^{4} The Greens Ecologist–Humanist List results are compared to Humanist Platform totals in the 1987 election.

=== San Cristóbal de La Laguna ===
Population: 118,548

← Summary of the 26 May 1991 City Council of San Cristóbal de La Laguna election results →
Parties and alliances	Popular vote			Seats	
Parties and alliances	Votes	%	±pp	Total	+/−
Tenerife Group of Independents (ATI)	19,752	41.97	+5.33	**12**	±0
Spanish Socialist Workers' Party (PSOE)	13,474	28.63	−0.86	**8**	−1
Independent Municipal Platform (PMI)	4,662	9.91	New	**3**	+3
Canarian Initiative (ICAN)^{1}	4,429	9.41	−3.66	**2**	±0
People's Party (PP)^{2}	3,487	7.41	−0.39	**2**	±0
Canarian Coalition for Independence (CI (FREPIC–Awañac))	408	0.87	+0.14	0	±0
Workers' Socialist Party (PST)	364	0.77	±0.00	0	±0
Democratic and Social Centre (CDS)	n/a	n/a	−8.71	0	−2
Blank ballots	491	1.04	+0.31		
**Total**	**47,067**			**27**	**±0**
Valid votes	47,067	98.84	+0.83		
Invalid votes	553	1.16	−0.83		
**Votes cast / turnout**	**47,620**	**55.56**	**−8.30**		
Abstentions	38,085	44.44	+8.30		
**Registered voters**	**85,705**				
Sources
Footnotes: ^{1} Canarian Initiative results are compared to the combined totals of Canarian Assembly–Canarian Nationalist Left and United Canarian Left in the 1987 election.; ^{2} People's Party results are compared to People's Alliance totals in the 1987 election.

=== Santa Cruz de Tenerife ===
Population: 222,892

← Summary of the 26 May 1991 City Council of Santa Cruz de Tenerife election results →
Parties and alliances	Popular vote			Seats	
Parties and alliances	Votes	%	±pp	Total	+/−
Tenerife Group of Independents (ATI)	39,053	54.65	−10.20	**16**	−5
Spanish Socialist Workers' Party (PSOE)	14,297	20.01	+4.70	**6**	+1
People's Party (PP)^{1}	7,576	10.60	+5.19	**3**	+2
Canarian Initiative (ICAN)^{2}	5,241	7.33	+0.92	**2**	+2
Democratic and Social Centre (CDS)	1,859	2.60	−1.53	0	±0
Canarian Coalition for Independence (CI (FREPIC–Awañac))	917	1.28	+0.79	0	±0
Canarian Nationalist Party (PNC)	776	1.09	New	0	±0
Party of The People (LG)	416	0.58	New	0	±0
Workers' Socialist Party (PST)	393	0.55	New	0	±0
Blank ballots	936	1.31	+0.65		
**Total**	**71,464**			**27**	**±0**
Valid votes	71,464	99.19	+0.46		
Invalid votes	582	0.81	−0.46		
**Votes cast / turnout**	**72,046**	**44.96**	**−15.23**		
Abstentions	88,208	55.04	+15.23		
**Registered voters**	**160,254**				
Sources
Footnotes: ^{1} People's Party results are compared to People's Alliance totals in the 1987 election.; ^{2} Canarian Initiative results are compared to the combined totals of United Canarian Left and Canarian Assembly–Canarian Nationalist Left in the 1987 election.

=== Telde ===
Population: 78,978

← Summary of the 26 May 1991 City Council of Telde election results →
Parties and alliances	Popular vote			Seats	
Parties and alliances	Votes	%	±pp	Total	+/−
Nationalist Canarian Assembly (ACN)^{1}	11,650	33.06	−2.09	**9**	−1
United Canarian Left (ICU)	8,827	25.05	+7.58	**6**	+1
Spanish Socialist Workers' Party (PSOE)	5,186	14.72	+4.06	**4**	+1
Democratic and Social Centre (CDS)	4,668	13.25	+0.45	**3**	±0
People's Party (PP)^{2}	4,240	12.03	−5.89	**3**	−1
Insular Group of Gran Canaria (AIGRANC)	246	0.70	−0.51	0	±0
The Greens Ecologist–Humanist List (LVLE–H)^{3}	208	0.59	+0.35	0	±0
Blank ballots	209	0.59	+0.09		
**Total**	**35,234**			**25**	**±0**
Valid votes	35,234	98.90	+0.59		
Invalid votes	392	1.10	−0.59		
**Votes cast / turnout**	**35,626**	**65.72**	**−4.34**		
Abstentions	18,586	34.28	+4.34		
**Registered voters**	**54,212**				
Sources
Footnotes: ^{1} Nationalist Canarian Assembly results are compared to Canarian Assembly–Canarian Nationalist Left totals in the 1987 election.; ^{2} People's Party results are compared to the combined totals of People's Alliance and People's Democratic Party–Canarian Centrists in the 1987 election.; ^{3} The Greens Ecologist–Humanist List results are compared to Humanist Platform totals in the 1987 election.

== See also ==
- 1991 Canarian regional election
