= Santa Cruz de Tenerife (Congress of Deputies constituency) =

Electoral constituency in Spain

Coordinates: 28°10′N 17°20′W

- Congress of Deputies; Electoral constituency
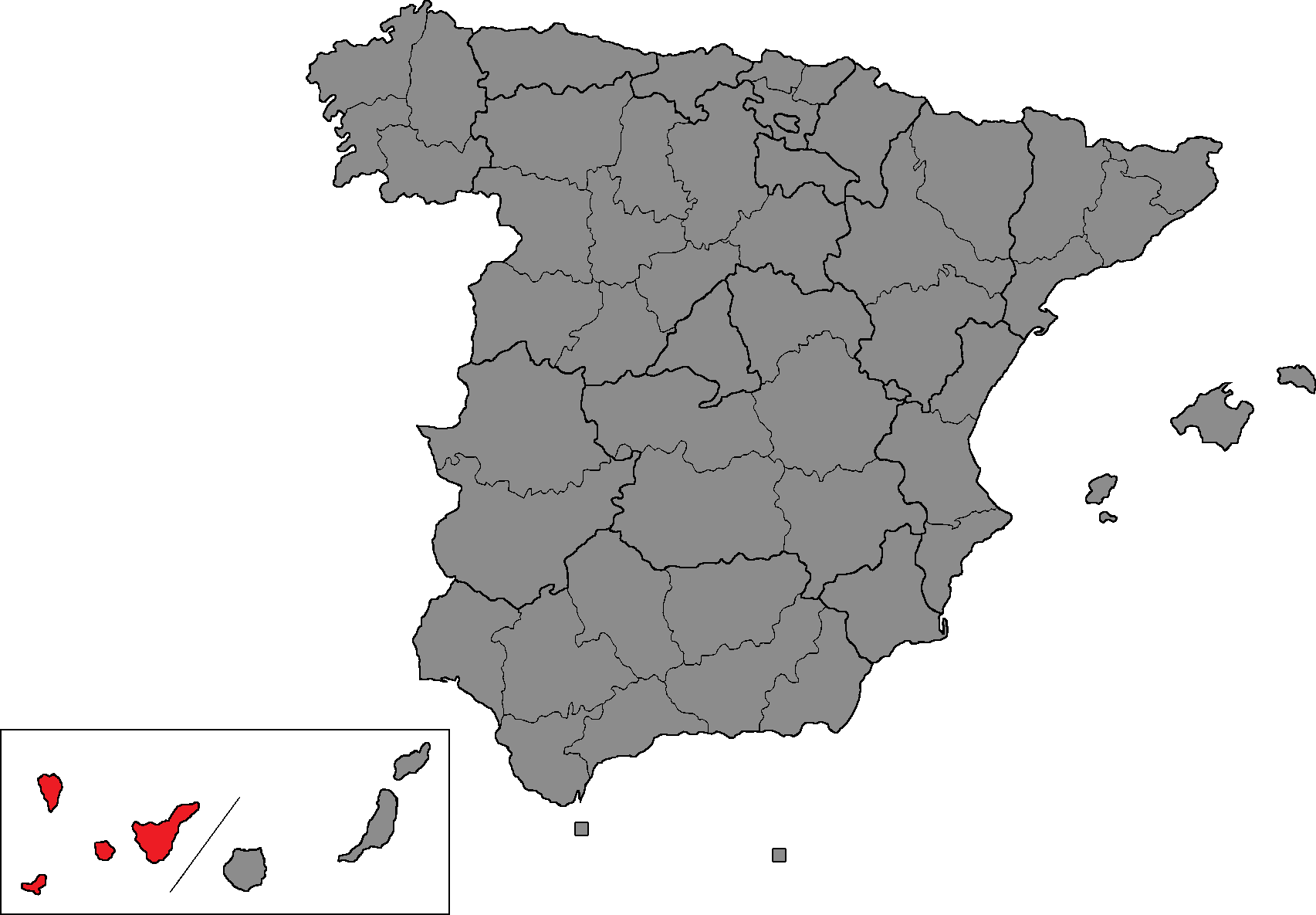
- Location of Santa Cruz de Tenerife within Spain
- Province: Santa Cruz de Tenerife
- Autonomous community: Canary Islands
- Population: ▲1,074,409 (2024)
- Electorate: ▲881,217 (2023)
- Major settlements: Santa Cruz de Tenerife, San Cristóbal de La Laguna, Arona

Current constituency
- Created: 1977
- Seats: 7 (1977–1986); 6 (1986–1989); 7 (1989–present)
- Members: PP (3); PSOE (3); CCa (1)

Santa Cruz de Tenerife is one of the 52 constituencies represented in the Congress of Deputies, the lower chamber of the Spanish parliament, the Cortes Generales. The constituency (whose boundaries correspond to those of the homonymous province) currently elects seven deputies. The electoral system uses the D'Hondt method and closed-list proportional voting, with a minimum threshold of three percent.

== Electoral system ==
The constituency was created as per the Political Reform Law and was first contested in the 1977 general election. The Law provided for the provinces of Spain to be established as multi-member districts in the Congress of Deputies, with this regulation being maintained under the Spanish Constitution of 1978. Additionally, the Constitution requires for any modification of the provincial limits to be approved under an organic law, needing an absolute majority in the Cortes Generales.

Voting is based on universal suffrage, comprising all Spanish nationals over 18 years of age with full political rights, provided that they have not been deprived of the right to vote by a final sentence. The only exception was in 1977, when this was limited to nationals over 21 years of age and in full enjoyment of their political and civil rights. Amendments in 2011 required non-resident citizens to apply for voting, a system known as "begged" voting (Spanish: Voto rogado). which was abolished in 2022. Further, amendments in 2018 granted the right to vote to those legally incapacitated. The Congress of Deputies has a minimum of 300 and a maximum of 400 seats, with electoral provisions fixing its size at 350. Of these, 348 are elected in 50 multi-member constituencies corresponding to the provinces of Spain—each of which is assigned an initial minimum of two seats and the remaining 248 distributed in proportion to population—using the D'Hondt method and closed-list proportional voting, with a three percent-threshold of valid votes (including blank ballots) in each constituency. The remaining two seats are allocated to Ceuta and Melilla as single-member districts elected by plurality voting. The use of this electoral method may result in a higher effective threshold depending on district magnitude and vote distribution. The law does not provide for by-elections to fill vacant seats; instead, any vacancies arising after the proclamation of candidates and during the legislative term are filled by the next candidates on the party lists or, when required, by designated substitutes.

The electoral law allows for parties and federations registered in the interior ministry, alliances and groupings of electors to present lists of candidates. Parties and federations intending to form an alliance are required to inform the relevant electoral commission within 10 days of the election call—15 before 1985—whereas groupings of electors need to secure the signature of at least one percent of the electorate in the constituencies for which they seek election—one permille of the electorate, with a compulsory minimum of 500 signatures, until 1985—disallowing electors from signing for more than one list. Also since 2011, parties, federations or alliances that have not obtained a mandate in either chamber of the Cortes at the preceding election are required to secure the signature of at least 0.1 percent of electors in the aforementioned constituencies. Amendments in 2007 required a balanced composition of men and women in the electoral lists, so that candidates of either sex made up at least 40 percent of the total composition; further amendments in 2024 required the use of a zipper system.

== Deputies ==
Deputies 1977–present
Key to parties U.Podemos Podemos PSOE CDS CCa–NC Cs CCa AIC UCD PP CP AP Vox
Legislature	Election	Distribution
Constituent	1977	2 / 5
1st	1979	2 / 5
2nd	1982	4 / 2 / 1
3rd	1986	3 / 1 / 1 / 1
4th	1989	4 / 1 / 1 / 1
5th	1993	3 / 2 / 2
6th	1996	3 / 2 / 2
7th	2000	2 / 2 / 3
8th	2004	3 / 2 / 2
9th	2008	3 / 2 / 2
10th	2011	2 / 1 / 4
11th	2015	1 / 2 / 1 / 1 / 2
12th	2016	1 / 1 / 1 / 1 / 3
13th	2019 (Apr)	1 / 2 / 1 / 2 / 1
14th	2019 (Nov)	1 / 2 / 1 / 2 / 1
15th	2023	3 / 1 / 3

== General elections ==
=== 2026 ===
Summary of the 29 November 2026 Congress of Deputies election results in Santa Cruz de Tenerife
Parties and alliances	Popular vote			Seats	
Parties and alliances	Votes	%	±pp	Total	+/−
People's Party (PP)					
Spanish Socialist Workers' Party (PSOE)					
Canarian Coalition–Municipalists Canaries First (CCa–1º CAN)					
Canarian People's Unity–UPC (NC–BC, Podemos, IU, Sumar)^{1}					
Animalist Party with the Environment (PACMA)					
Workers' Front (FO)					
Drago Canaries Party (DRG)			New		
The Party is Over (SALF)			New		
Vox (Vox)			New		
Canarian Liberation (LIB)			New		
Communist Party of the Workers of Spain (PCTE)			New		
Self-employed Party (Partido Autónomos)			New		
Blank ballots					
Total				7	±0
Valid votes					
Invalid votes					
Votes cast / turnout					
Abstentions					
Registered voters	927,138				
Sources
Footnotes: ^{1} Canarian People's Unity results are compared to the combined totals of Unite Canaries, New Canaries–Canarian Bloc and Zero Cuts in the 2023 election.

=== 2023 ===
Summary of the 23 July 2023 Congress of Deputies election results in Santa Cruz de Tenerife
Parties and alliances	Popular vote			Seats	
Parties and alliances	Votes	%	±pp	Total	+/−
People's Party (PP)	174,770	35.35	+15.20	3	+1
Spanish Socialist Workers' Party (PSOE)	165,590	33.49	+4.90	3	+1
Canarian Coalition (CCa)^{1}	82,805	16.75	n/a	1	±0
Unite Canaries (Sumar)^{2}	53,632	10.85	–4.51	0	–1
Animalist Party with the Environment (PACMA)^{3}	6,147	1.24	–0.09	0	±0
New Canaries–Canarian Bloc (NC–BC)^{1}	3,165	0.64	n/a	0	±0
Workers' Front (FO)	1,619	0.33	New	0	±0
Canaries Now–Communist Party of the Canarian People (ANC–UP–PCPC)^{4}	791	0.16	–0.14	0	±0
Zero Cuts (Recortes Cero)	766	0.15	+0.04	0	±0
Vox (Vox)	n/a	n/a	–11.54	0	–1
Blank ballots	5,088	1.03	+0.30		
Total	494,373			7	±0
Valid votes	494,373	98.72	–0.33		
Invalid votes	6,404	1.28	+0.33		
Votes cast / turnout	500,777	56.83	+2.10		
Abstentions	380,440	43.17	–2.10		
Registered voters	881,217				
Sources
Footnotes: ^{1} Within the Canarian Coalition–New Canaries alliance in the November 2019 election.; ^{2} Unite Canaries results are compared to the combined totals of United We Can and More Country–Equo in the November 2019 election.; ^{3} Animalist Party with the Environment results are compared to Animalist Party Against Mistreatment of Animals totals in the November 2019 election.; ^{4} Canaries Now–Communist Party of the Canarian People results are compared to the combined totals of Canaries Now and Communist Party of the Canarian People in the November 2019 election.

=== November 2019 ===
Summary of the 10 November 2019 Congress of Deputies election results in Santa Cruz de Tenerife
Parties and alliances	Popular vote			Seats	
Parties and alliances	Votes	%	±pp	Total	+/−
Spanish Socialist Workers' Party (PSOE)	132,518	28.59	+1.26	2	±0
People's Party (PP)	93,434	20.15	+5.34	2	+1
Canarian Coalition–New Canaries (CCa–PNC–NC)^{1}	76,261	16.45	–3.46	1	–1
United We Can (Podemos–IU)	64,613	13.94	–0.72	1	±0
Vox (Vox)	53,491	11.54	+5.46	1	+1
Citizens–Party of the Citizenry (Cs)	22,979	4.96	–8.92	0	–1
More Country–Equo (Más País–Equo)	6,583	1.42	New	0	±0
Animalist Party Against Mistreatment of Animals (PACMA)	6,150	1.33	–0.44	0	±0
The Greens (Verdes)	1,322	0.29	New	0	±0
Canaries Now (ANC–UP)	922	0.20	–0.14	0	±0
Zero Cuts–Green Group (Recortes Cero–GV)	489	0.11	–0.12	0	±0
Communist Party of the Canarian People (PCPC)	464	0.10	–0.03	0	±0
Blank Seats (EB)	418	0.09	New	0	±0
For a Fairer World (PUM+J)	319	0.07	–0.04	0	±0
With You, We Are Democracy (Contigo)	236	0.05	New	0	±0
Blank ballots	3,380	0.73	+0.08		
Total	463,579			7	±0
Valid votes	463,579	99.05	+0.08		
Invalid votes	4,443	0.95	–0.08		
Votes cast / turnout	468,022	54.73	–6.53		
Abstentions	387,116	45.27	+6.53		
Registered voters	855,138				
Sources
Footnotes: ^{1} Canarian Coalition–New Canaries results are compared to Canarian Coalition–Canarian Nationalist Party totals in the April 2019 election.

=== April 2019 ===
Summary of the 28 April 2019 Congress of Deputies election results in Santa Cruz de Tenerife
Parties and alliances	Popular vote			Seats	
Parties and alliances	Votes	%	±pp	Total	+/−
Spanish Socialist Workers' Party (PSOE)	141,132	27.33	+6.12	2	+1
Canarian Coalition–Canarian Nationalist Party (CCa–PNC)	102,811	19.91	+7.27	2	+1
People's Party (PP)	76,491	14.81	–19.41	1	–2
United We Can (Podemos–IU–Equo)	75,695	14.66	–3.21	1	±0
Citizens–Party of the Citizenry (Cs)	71,667	13.88	+2.85	1	±0
Vox (Vox)	31,385	6.08	New	0	±0
Animalist Party Against Mistreatment of Animals (PACMA)	9,157	1.77	+0.04	0	±0
Canaries Now (ANC–UP)	1,774	0.34	New	0	±0
Zero Cuts–Green Group (Recortes Cero–GV)	1,212	0.23	–0.07	0	±0
Communist Party of the Canarian People (PCPC)	655	0.13	–0.01	0	±0
For a Fairer World (PUM+J)	582	0.11	New	0	±0
Feminism8 (F8)	571	0.11	New	0	±0
Blank ballots	3,352	0.65	+0.07		
Total	516,484			7	±0
Valid votes	516,484	98.97	+0.06		
Invalid votes	5,398	1.03	–0.06		
Votes cast / turnout	521,882	61.26	+3.43		
Abstentions	330,014	38.74	–3.43		
Registered voters	851,896				

=== 2016 ===
Summary of the 26 June 2016 Congress of Deputies election results in Santa Cruz de Tenerife
Parties and alliances	Popular vote			Seats	
Parties and alliances	Votes	%	±pp	Total	+/−
People's Party (PP)	163,129	34.22	+5.30	3	+1
Spanish Socialist Workers' Party–New Canaries (PSOE–NCa)	101,120	21.21	–0.32	1	–1
United We Can (Podemos–IU–Equo–CLI–AS)^{1}	85,178	17.87	–5.28	1	±0
Canarian Coalition–Canarian Nationalist Party (CCa–PNC)	60,271	12.64	+0.06	1	±0
Citizens–Party of the Citizenry (C's)	52,576	11.03	+0.51	1	±0
Animalist Party Against Mistreatment of Animals (PACMA)	8,243	1.73	+0.36	0	±0
Zero Cuts–Green Group (Recortes Cero–GV)	1,417	0.30	+0.05	0	±0
Together for Canaries (JxC)	653	0.14	New	0	±0
Communist Party of the Canarian People (PCPC)	649	0.14	–0.02	0	±0
Blank Seats (EB)	647	0.14	New	0	±0
Blank ballots	2,783	0.58	–0.08		
Total	476,666			7	±0
Valid votes	476,666	98.91	+0.02		
Invalid votes	5,259	1.09	–0.02		
Votes cast / turnout	481,925	57.83	–0.37		
Abstentions	351,448	42.17	+0.37		
Registered voters	833,373				
Sources
Footnotes: ^{1} United We Can results are compared to the combined totals of We Can and Canarian United Left–Popular Unity in Common in the 2015 election.

=== 2015 ===
Summary of the 20 December 2015 Congress of Deputies election results in Santa Cruz de Tenerife
Parties and alliances	Popular vote			Seats	
Parties and alliances	Votes	%	±pp	Total	+/−
People's Party (PP)	138,203	28.92	–15.91	2	–2
Spanish Socialist Workers' Party–New Canaries (PSOE–NCa)	102,892	21.53	–1.97	2	±0
We Can (Podemos)	94,936	19.86	New	1	+1
Canarian Coalition–Canarian Nationalist Party (CCa–PNC)^{1}	60,129	12.58	–7.20	1	±0
Citizens–Party of the Citizenry (C's)	50,257	10.52	New	1	+1
Canarian United Left–Popular Unity in Common (IUC–UPeC)	15,716	3.29	–1.11	0	±0
Animalist Party Against Mistreatment of Animals (PACMA)	6,537	1.37	+0.74	0	±0
Union, Progress and Democracy (UPyD)	2,117	0.44	–4.08	0	±0
Canaries Decides (LV–UP–ALTER)	1,278	0.27	New	0	±0
Zero Cuts–Green Group (Recortes Cero–GV)	1,182	0.25	New	0	±0
Vox (Vox)	772	0.16	New	0	±0
Communist Party of the Canarian People (PCPC)	759	0.16	–0.02	0	±0
Blank ballots	3,151	0.66	–0.44		
Total	477,929			7	±0
Valid votes	477,929	98.89	+0.52		
Invalid votes	5,365	1.11	–0.52		
Votes cast / turnout	483,294	58.20	–0.51		
Abstentions	347,074	41.80	+0.51		
Registered voters	830,368				
Sources
Footnotes: ^{1} Canarian Coalition–Canarian Nationalist Party results are compared to Canarian Coalition–New Canaries totals in the 2011 election.

=== 2011 ===
Summary of the 20 November 2011 Congress of Deputies election results in Santa Cruz de Tenerife
Parties and alliances	Popular vote			Seats	
Parties and alliances	Votes	%	±pp	Total	+/−
People's Party (PP)	205,221	44.83	+14.66	4	+2
Spanish Socialist Workers' Party (PSOE)	107,600	23.50	–12.99	2	–1
Canarian Coalition–New Canaries (CC–NC–PNC)^{1}	90,552	19.78	–9.38	1	–1
Canarian United Left–El Hierro Initiative–The Greens: Plural Left (IUC–IpH–LV)	20,152	4.40	+2.99	0	±0
Union, Progress and Democracy (UPyD)	11,316	2.47	+2.11	0	±0
Yes We Can–Socialists for Tenerife–Equo (SSP–SxTF–Equo)	10,173	2.22	New	0	±0
Animalist Party Against Mistreatment of Animals (PACMA)	2,894	0.63	New	0	±0
Canarian Nationalist Alternative (ANC)	2,193	0.48	+0.35	0	±0
For a Fairer World (PUM+J)	1,384	0.30	+0.21	0	±0
Communist Party of the Peoples of Spain (PCPE)	845	0.18	+0.05	0	±0
Communist Unification of Spain (UCE)	438	0.10	New	0	±0
Blank ballots	5,054	1.10	+0.44		
Total	457,822			7	±0
Valid votes	457,822	98.37	–1.09		
Invalid votes	7,583	1.63	+1.09		
Votes cast / turnout	465,405	58.71	–6.22		
Abstentions	327,368	41.29	+6.22		
Registered voters	792,773				
Sources
Footnotes: ^{1} Canarian Coalition–New Canaries results are compared to Canarian Coalition–Canarian Nationalist Party totals in the 2008 election.

=== 2008 ===
Summary of the 9 March 2008 Congress of Deputies election results in Santa Cruz de Tenerife
Parties and alliances	Popular vote			Seats	
Parties and alliances	Votes	%	±pp	Total	+/−
Spanish Socialist Workers' Party (PSOE)	179,622	36.49	+1.48	3	±0
People's Party (PP)	148,501	30.17	+1.83	2	±0
Canarian Coalition–Canarian Nationalist Party (CC–PNC)^{1}	143,526	29.16	–2.62	2	±0
Canarian United Left–Alternative (IUC)	6,940	1.41	–0.44	0	±0
The Greens (Verdes)	2,071	0.42	New	0	±0
Union, Progress and Democracy (UPyD)	1,750	0.36	New	0	±0
The Greens–Green Group (LV–GV)	1,487	0.30	–0.70	0	±0
Communist Party of the Canarian People (PCPC)	646	0.13	+0.01	0	±0
Canarian Nationalist Alternative (ANC)	641	0.13	New	0	±0
Social Democratic Party (PSD)	470	0.10	New	0	±0
Citizens for Blank Votes (CenB)	468	0.10	New	0	±0
Citizens' Union–Independent Progressives of Canaries (UC–PIC)	464	0.09	New	0	±0
For a Fairer World (PUM+J)	442	0.09	New	0	±0
Movement for the Unity of the Canarian People (MUPC)	286	0.06	New	0	±0
Unity of the People (UP)	245	0.05	New	0	±0
Liberal Democratic Centre (CDL)	208	0.04	New	0	±0
Humanist Party (PH)	205	0.04	–0.03	0	±0
National Democracy (DN)	199	0.04	±0.00	0	±0
Family and Life Party (PFyV)	159	0.03	New	0	±0
Citizens–Party of the Citizenry (C's)	158	0.03	New	0	±0
Spanish Alternative (AES)	141	0.03	New	0	±0
Authentic Phalanx (FA)	134	0.03	–0.01	0	±0
Spanish Phalanx of the CNSO (FE de las JONS)	125	0.03	–0.01	0	±0
Spanish Front (Frente)	85	0.02	New	0	±0
Blank ballots	3,258	0.66	–0.26		
Total	492,231			7	±0
Valid votes	492,231	99.46	–0.06		
Invalid votes	2,673	0.54	+0.06		
Votes cast / turnout	494,904	64.93	–0.74		
Abstentions	267,317	35.07	+0.74		
Registered voters	762,221				
Sources
Footnotes: ^{1} Canarian Coalition–Canarian Nationalist Party results are compared to the combined totals of Canarian Coalition and the Canarian Nationalist Party in the 2004 election.

=== 2004 ===
Summary of the 14 March 2004 Congress of Deputies election results in Santa Cruz de Tenerife
Parties and alliances	Popular vote			Seats	
Parties and alliances	Votes	%	±pp	Total	+/−
Spanish Socialist Workers' Party (PSOE)	165,158	35.01	+8.67	3	+1
Canarian Coalition (CC)	145,801	30.91	–2.79	2	±0
People's Party (PP)	133,677	28.34	–6.64	2	–1
The Greens–United Left–Citizens' Alternative Initiative (LV–IU–AC25M)	8,736	1.85	–0.46	0	±0
The Greens–Green Group (LV–GV)	4,732	1.00	New	0	±0
Canarian Nationalist Party (PNC)	4,092	0.87	New	0	±0
Canarian Popular Alternative (APCa)	1,511	0.32	New	0	±0
Democratic and Social Centre (CDS)	657	0.14	–0.02	0	±0
Internationalist Socialist Workers' Party (POSI)	582	0.12	New	0	±0
Communist Party of the Canarian People (PCPC)	548	0.12	–0.04	0	±0
Party of The People (LG)	378	0.08	New	0	±0
Humanist Party (PH)	341	0.07	–0.05	0	±0
Republican Left (IR)	305	0.06	New	0	±0
National Democracy (DN)	210	0.04	New	0	±0
Authentic Phalanx (FA)	208	0.04	New	0	±0
Spanish Phalanx of the CNSO (FE de las JONS)	200	0.04	New	0	±0
The Phalanx (FE)	134	0.03	–0.05	0	±0
Republican Social Movement (MSR)	106	0.02	New	0	±0
Blank ballots	4,333	0.92	+0.11		
Total	471,709			7	±0
Valid votes	471,709	99.52	+0.05		
Invalid votes	2,275	0.48	–0.05		
Votes cast / turnout	473,984	65.67	+5.97		
Abstentions	247,797	34.33	–5.97		
Registered voters	721,781				

=== 2000 ===
Summary of the 12 March 2000 Congress of Deputies election results in Santa Cruz de Tenerife
Parties and alliances	Popular vote			Seats	
Parties and alliances	Votes	%	±pp	Total	+/−
People's Party (PP)	140,336	34.98	+2.60	3	+1
Canarian Coalition (CC)	135,186	33.70	+7.43	2	±0
Spanish Socialist Workers' Party–Progressives (PSOE–p)	105,668	26.34	–8.14	2	–1
Canarian United Left (IUC)	9,273	2.31	–2.91	0	±0
The Greens of Canaries (Verdes)	5,320	1.33	New	0	±0
Communist Party of the Canarian People (PCPC)	656	0.16	+0.06	0	±0
Centrist Union–Democratic and Social Centre (UC–CDS)	623	0.16	–0.03	0	±0
Humanist Party (PH)	501	0.12	+0.06	0	±0
The Phalanx (FE)	331	0.08	New	0	±0
Blank ballots	3,264	0.81	+0.31		
Total	401,158			7	±0
Valid votes	401,158	99.47	–0.17		
Invalid votes	2,144	0.53	+0.17		
Votes cast / turnout	403,302	59.70	–7.28		
Abstentions	272,228	40.30	+7.28		
Registered voters	675,530				

=== 1996 ===
Summary of the 3 March 1996 Congress of Deputies election results in Santa Cruz de Tenerife
Parties and alliances	Popular vote			Seats	
Parties and alliances	Votes	%	±pp	Total	+/−
Spanish Socialist Workers' Party (PSOE)	144,480	34.48	–0.78	3	±0
People's Party (PP)	135,701	32.38	+2.96	2	±0
Canarian Coalition (CC)	110,080	26.27	–0.48	2	±0
Canarian United Left (IUC)	21,867	5.22	+0.61	0	±0
The Greens–Green Group (LV–GV)	1,539	0.37	New	0	±0
Popular Front of the Canary Islands (FREPIC)	1,071	0.26	New	0	±0
Centrist Union (UC)	808	0.19	–1.31	0	±0
Green Left of the Canary Islands (Izegzawen)	508	0.12	New	0	±0
Communist Party of the Canarian People (PCPC)	415	0.10	New	0	±0
Humanist Party (PH)	261	0.06	–0.02	0	±0
Party of The People (LG)	243	0.06	–0.04	0	±0
Tenerife Independent Familiar Groups (AFIT)	0	0.00	New	0	±0
Blank ballots	2,098	0.50	–0.03		
Total	419,071			7	±0
Valid votes	419,071	99.64	+0.32		
Invalid votes	1,494	0.36	–0.32		
Votes cast / turnout	420,565	66.98	+0.15		
Abstentions	207,302	33.02	–0.15		
Registered voters	627,867				

=== 1993 ===
Summary of the 6 June 1993 Congress of Deputies election results in Santa Cruz de Tenerife
Parties and alliances	Popular vote			Seats	
Parties and alliances	Votes	%	±pp	Total	+/−
Spanish Socialist Workers' Party (PSOE)	137,281	35.26	–5.39	3	–1
People's Party (PP)	114,535	29.42	+11.50	2	+1
Canarian Coalition (CC)^{1}	104,164	26.75	+5.62	2	+1
Canarian United Left (IUC)	17,932	4.61	–0.95	0	±0
Democratic and Social Centre (CDS)	5,846	1.50	–8.56	0	–1
The Ecologists (LE)	2,801	0.72	+0.05	0	±0
Workers' Socialist Party (PST)	1,569	0.40	–0.23	0	±0
Tenerife Assembly (ATF)	1,159	0.30	New	0	±0
Coalition for a New Socialist Party (CNPS)	454	0.12	New	0	±0
Ruiz-Mateos Group–European Democratic Alliance (ARM–ADE)	448	0.12	–1.12	0	±0
Party of The People (LG)	385	0.10	New	0	±0
Natural Law Party (PLN)	374	0.10	New	0	±0
Humanist Party (PH)	305	0.08	–0.03	0	±0
Blank ballots	2,076	0.53	+0.03		
Total	389,329			7	±0
Valid votes	389,329	99.32	+0.36		
Invalid votes	2,667	0.68	–0.36		
Votes cast / turnout	391,996	66.83	+6.17		
Abstentions	194,520	33.17	–6.17		
Registered voters	586,516				
Sources
Footnotes: ^{1} Canarian Coalition results are compared to Canarian Independent Groups totals in the 1989 election.

=== 1989 ===
Summary of the 29 October 1989 Congress of Deputies election results in Santa Cruz de Tenerife
Parties and alliances	Popular vote			Seats	
Parties and alliances	Votes	%	±pp	Total	+/−
Spanish Socialist Workers' Party (PSOE)	128,360	40.65	+0.81	4	+1
Canarian Independent Groups (AIC)	58,434	18.50	+0.12	1	±0
People's Party (PP)^{1}	56,600	17.92	–0.12	1	±0
Democratic and Social Centre (CDS)	31,776	10.06	–2.21	1	±0
United Left–United Canarian Left (IU–ICU)	17,546	5.56	+2.65	0	±0
Canarian Nationalist Assembly (ACN)^{2}	8,295	2.63	–2.22	0	±0
Ruiz-Mateos Group (Ruiz-Mateos)	3,906	1.24	New	0	±0
The Greens–Green List (LV–LV)	3,139	0.99	+0.54	0	±0
The Ecologist Greens (LVE)	2,117	0.67	New	0	±0
Workers' Socialist Party (PST)	1,990	0.63	–0.41	0	±0
Workers' Party of Spain–Communist Unity (PTE–UC)	844	0.27	New	0	±0
Communist Party of the Canarian People (PCPC)	521	0.16	New	0	±0
Spanish Phalanx of the CNSO (FE–JONS)	376	0.12	–0.12	0	±0
Humanist Party (PH)	336	0.11	New	0	±0
Blank ballots	1,566	0.50	+0.18		
Total	315,806			7	+1
Valid votes	315,806	98.96	+0.60		
Invalid votes	3,323	1.04	–0.60		
Votes cast / turnout	319,129	60.66	–4.91		
Abstentions	206,999	39.34	+4.91		
Registered voters	526,128				
Sources
Footnotes: ^{1} People's Party results are compared to People's Coalition totals in the 1986 election.; ^{2} Canarian Nationalist Assembly results are compared to Canarian Assembly–Canarian Nationalist Left totals in the 1986 election.

=== 1986 ===
Summary of the 22 June 1986 Congress of Deputies election results in Santa Cruz de Tenerife
Parties and alliances	Popular vote			Seats	
Parties and alliances	Votes	%	±pp	Total	+/−
Spanish Socialist Workers' Party (PSOE)	127,292	39.84	–1.06	3	–1
Canarian Independent Groups (AIC)	58,737	18.38	New	1	+1
People's Coalition (AP–PDP–PL)^{1}	57,646	18.04	–6.51	1	–1
Democratic and Social Centre (CDS)	39,210	12.27	+8.32	1	+1
Canarian Assembly–Canarian Nationalist Left (AC–INC)	15,499	4.85	+2.92	0	±0
United Canarian Left (ICU)	9,312	2.91	New	0	±0
Workers' Socialist Party (PST)	3,313	1.04	–0.05	0	±0
Democratic Reformist Party (PRD)	2,055	0.64	New	0	±0
The Greens (Verdes)	1,451	0.45	New	0	±0
Communist Unification of Spain (UCE)	1,280	0.40	+0.37	0	±0
Spanish Vertex Ecological Development Revindication (VERDE)	1,088	0.34	New	0	±0
Internationalist Socialist Workers' Party (POSI)	815	0.26	New	0	±0
Spanish Phalanx of the CNSO (FE–JONS)	760	0.24	New	0	±0
Union of the Democratic Centre (UCD)	n/a	n/a	–19.29	0	–1
Blank ballots	1,029	0.32	–0.13		
Total	319,487			6	–1
Valid votes	319,487	98.36	+0.78		
Invalid votes	5,322	1.64	–0.78		
Votes cast / turnout	324,809	65.57	–9.58		
Abstentions	170,569	34.43	+9.58		
Registered voters	495,378				
Sources
Footnotes: ^{1} People's Coalition results are compared to People's Alliance–People's Democratic Party totals in the 1982 election.

=== 1982 ===
Summary of the 28 October 1982 Congress of Deputies election results in Santa Cruz de Tenerife
Parties and alliances	Popular vote			Seats	
Parties and alliances	Votes	%	±pp	Total	+/−
Spanish Socialist Workers' Party (PSOE)	130,249	40.90	+19.15	4	+2
People's Alliance–People's Democratic Party (AP–PDP)^{1}	78,174	24.55	+20.00	2	+2
Union of the Democratic Centre (UCD)	61,436	19.29	–37.49	1	–4
Canarian People's Union (UPC)	18,772	5.90	–2.48	0	±0
Democratic and Social Centre (CDS)	12,587	3.95	New	0	±0
Canarian Assembly–Canarian Coordinator (AC–CC)	6,132	1.93	New	0	±0
Workers' Socialist Party (PST)	3,469	1.09	New	0	±0
Canarian Nationalist Party (PNC)	2,206	0.69	New	0	±0
New Force (FN)^{2}	1,315	0.41	–1.00	0	±0
Canarian Social Democratic Association (ASDC)	1,131	0.36	New	0	±0
Communist Party of Spain (Marxist–Leninist) (PCE (m–l))	799	0.25	New	0	±0
Communist League–Internationalist Socialist Workers' Coalition (LC (COSI))	632	0.20	New	0	±0
Communist Unification of Spain (UCE)	85	0.03	–0.16	0	±0
Revolutionary Communist League (LCR)	0	0.00	–0.42	0	±0
Blank ballots	1,446	0.45	+0.18		
Total	318,433			7	±0
Valid votes	318,433	97.58	–0.61		
Invalid votes	7,901	2.42	+0.61		
Votes cast / turnout	326,334	75.15	+22.30		
Abstentions	107,936	24.85	–22.30		
Registered voters	434,270				
Sources
Footnotes: ^{1} People's Alliance–People's Democratic Party results are compared to Democratic Coalition totals in the 1979 election.; ^{2} New Force results are compared to National Union totals in the 1979 election.

=== 1979 ===
Summary of the 1 March 1979 Congress of Deputies election results in Santa Cruz de Tenerife
Parties and alliances	Popular vote			Seats	
Parties and alliances	Votes	%	±pp	Total	+/−
Union of the Democratic Centre (UCD)	139,908	56.78	+3.55	5	±0
Spanish Socialist Workers' Party (PSOE)^{1}	53,604	21.75	–2.99	2	±0
Canarian People's Union (UPC)	20,649	8.38	New	0	±0
Communist Party of the Canaries (PCC–PCE)	11,560	4.69	+0.65	0	±0
Democratic Coalition (CD)^{2}	11,204	4.55	–6.01	0	±0
National Union (UN)	3,482	1.41	New	0	±0
Workers' Revolutionary Organization (ORT)	1,796	0.73	New	0	±0
Party of Labour of Spain (PTE)	1,644	0.67	New	0	±0
Revolutionary Communist League (LCR)	1,041	0.42	New	0	±0
Carlist Party (PC)	852	0.35	New	0	±0
Blank ballots	669	0.27	–0.06		
Total	246,409			7	±0
Valid votes	246,409	98.19	–0.04		
Invalid votes	4,531	1.81	+0.04		
Votes cast / turnout	250,940	52.85	–14.58		
Abstentions	223,901	47.15	+14.58		
Registered voters	474,841				
Sources
Footnotes: ^{1} Spanish Socialist Workers' Party results are compared to the combined totals of Spanish Socialist Workers' Party and People's Socialist Party–Socialist Unity in the 1977 election.; ^{2} Democratic Coalition results are compared to People's Alliance totals in the 1977 election.

=== 1977 ===
Summary of the 15 June 1977 Congress of Deputies election results in Santa Cruz de Tenerife
Parties and alliances	Popular vote			Seats	
Parties and alliances	Votes	%	±pp	Total	+/−
Union of the Democratic Centre (UCD)	140,237	53.23	n/a	5	n/a
Spanish Socialist Workers' Party (PSOE)	50,951	19.34	n/a	2	n/a
People's Alliance (AP)	27,828	10.56	n/a	0	n/a
People's Socialist Party–Socialist Unity (PSP–US)	14,215	5.40	n/a	0	n/a
Communist Party of the Canaries (PCC–PCE)	10,643	4.04	n/a	0	n/a
Canarian People's Party (PPCan)	7,768	2.95	n/a	0	n/a
United Canarian Left (ICU)	4,118	1.56	n/a	0	n/a
Spanish Phalanx of the CNSO (Authentic) (FE–JONS(A))	4,099	1.56	n/a	0	n/a
Socialist Party of Canaries (PSCan)	2,726	1.03	n/a	0	n/a
Blank ballots	860	0.33	n/a		
Total	263,445			7	n/a
Valid votes	263,445	98.23	n/a		
Invalid votes	4,739	1.77	n/a		
Votes cast / turnout	268,184	67.43	n/a		
Abstentions	129,548	32.57	n/a		
Registered voters	397,732				

== Bibliography ==
- Ley 1/1977, de 4 de enero, para la Reforma Política (Fundamental Law 1/1977). Official State Gazette (in Spanish). 4 January 1977. BOE-A-1977-165.
- Real Decreto-ley 20/1977, de 18 de marzo, sobre Normas Electorales (Royal Decree-Law 20/1977). Official State Gazette (in Spanish). 18 March 1977. BOE-A-1977-7445.
- Constitución Española (Constitution). Official State Gazette (in Spanish). 27 December 1978. BOE-A-1978-31229.
- Ley Orgánica 5/1985, de 19 de junio, del Régimen Electoral General (Organic Law 5/1985). Official State Gazette (in Spanish). 19 June 1985. BOE-A-1985-11672.
- Carreras de Odriozola, Albert; Tafunell Sambola, Xavier (2005) [1989]. Estadísticas históricas de España, siglos XIX-XX (PDF) (in Spanish). Vol. 1 (II ed.). Bilbao: Fundación BBVA. pp. 1072–1097. ISBN 84-96515-00-1. Archived from the original (PDF) on 24 September 2015.
