= 1999 Spanish local elections in the Canary Islands =

This article presents the results breakdown of the local elections held in the Canary Islands on 13 June 1999. The following tables show detailed results in the autonomous community's most populous municipalities, sorted alphabetically.

== City control ==
The following table lists party control in the most populous municipalities, including provincial capitals (highlighted in bold). Gains for a party are highlighted in that party's colour.

Municipality	Population	Previous control	New control
Arona	29,792	Canarian Coalition (CC)	Canarian Coalition (CC)
**Las Palmas de Gran Canaria**	352,641	People's Party (PP)	People's Party (PP)
San Cristóbal de La Laguna	127,945	Canarian Coalition (CC)	Canarian Coalition (CC)
**Santa Cruz de Tenerife**	211,930	Canarian Coalition (CC)	Canarian Coalition (CC)
Telde	83,733	Canarian Coalition (CC)	Canarian Coalition (CC)

== Municipalities ==
=== Arona ===
Population: 29,792

← Summary of the 13 June 1999 City Council of Arona election results →
Parties and alliances	Popular vote			Seats	
Parties and alliances	Votes	%	±pp	Total	+/−
Spanish Socialist Workers' Party (PSOE)	4,277	33.19	−6.81	**8**	−1
Canarian Coalition (CC)^{1}	3,763	29.20	+0.68	**7**	+1
People's Party (PP)	2,338	18.14	+1.47	**4**	±0
Centrist Union–Democratic and Social Centre (UC–CDS)	1,509	11.71	+1.66	**2**	±0
Canarian United Left (IUC)	248	1.92	−0.73	0	±0
Canarian Nationalist Party (PNC)	247	1.92	New	0	±0
Tenerife Democratic Alternative (ADT)	198	1.54	New	0	±0
Independent Tenerife Democratic Action (ADTI)	143	1.11	New	0	±0
Independent Lists of European Citizens (LICE)	47	0.36	New	0	±0
Blank ballots	118	0.92	+0.14		
**Total**	**12,888**			**21**	**±0**
Valid votes	12,888	99.40	−0.24		
Invalid votes	78	0.60	+0.24		
**Votes cast / turnout**	**12,966**	**49.26**	**−5.88**		
Abstentions	13,353	50.74	+5.88		
**Registered voters**	**26,319**				
Sources
Footnotes: ^{1} Canarian Coalition results are compared to the combined totals of Tenerife Group of Independents–Independent Electoral Movement, Canarian Initiative and Nationalist Canarian Centre in the 1995 election.

=== Las Palmas de Gran Canaria ===
Population: 352,641

← Summary of the 13 June 1999 City Council of Las Palmas de Gran Canaria election results →
Parties and alliances	Popular vote			Seats	
Parties and alliances	Votes	%	±pp	Total	+/−
People's Party (PP)	94,088	57.54	+9.18	**19**	+4
Spanish Socialist Workers' Party (PSOE)	24,177	14.79	−3.29	**5**	±0
Canarian Coalition (CC)	22,710	13.89	−2.44	**4**	−1
Party of Gran Canaria (PGC)	9,607	5.88	−0.45	**1**	−1
Canarian United Left (IUC)	6,605	4.04	−2.59	0	−2
Centrist Union–Democratic and Social Centre (UC–CDS)	1,203	0.74	+0.32	0	±0
Canarian Nationalist Party (PNC)	1,106	0.68	New	0	±0
Humanist Party (PH)	691	0.42	+0.08	0	±0
Nationalist Maga Alternative (AMAGA)	580	0.35	New	0	±0
Pensionist Assembly of the Canaries (TPC)	364	0.22	New	0	±0
Blank ballots	2,384	1.46	+0.22		
**Total**	**163,515**			**29**	**±0**
Valid votes	163,515	99.35	+0.02		
Invalid votes	1,069	0.65	−0.02		
**Votes cast / turnout**	**164,584**	**54.63**	**−5.58**		
Abstentions	136,697	45.37	+5.58		
**Registered voters**	**301,281**				

=== San Cristóbal de La Laguna ===
Population: 127,945

← Summary of the 13 June 1999 City Council of San Cristóbal de La Laguna election results →
Parties and alliances	Popular vote			Seats	
Parties and alliances	Votes	%	±pp	Total	+/−
Spanish Socialist Workers' Party (PSOE)	22,936	40.19	+14.66	**13**	+6
Canarian Coalition (CC)	18,188	31.87	−3.70	**10**	−1
People's Party (PP)	8,557	14.99	−13.54	**4**	−4
Canarian Nationalist Party (PNC)	2,770	4.85	New	0	±0
Canarian United Left (IUC)	1,624	2.85	−3.11	0	−1
The Greens of the Canaries (Verdes)	1,158	2.03	New	0	±0
Centrist Union–Democratic and Social Centre (UC–CDS)	623	1.09	+0.71	0	±0
Humanist Party (PH)	211	0.37	+0.11	0	±0
Blank ballots	999	1.75	+0.18		
**Total**	**57,066**			**27**	**±0**
Valid votes	57,066	99.29	+0.44		
Invalid votes	410	0.71	−0.44		
**Votes cast / turnout**	**57,476**	**56.92**	**+0.07**		
Abstentions	43,498	43.08	−0.07		
**Registered voters**	**100,974**				

=== Santa Cruz de Tenerife ===
Population: 211,930

← Summary of the 13 June 1999 City Council of Santa Cruz de Tenerife election results →
Parties and alliances	Popular vote			Seats	
Parties and alliances	Votes	%	±pp	Total	+/−
Canarian Coalition (CC)	47,719	57.46	+18.29	**18**	+7
People's Party (PP)	13,887	16.72	−17.14	**5**	−5
Spanish Socialist Workers' Party (PSOE)	11,154	13.43	−2.01	**4**	±0
Canarian United Left (IUC)	3,101	3.73	−3.87	0	−2
Canarian Nationalist Party (PNC)	2,765	3.33	New	0	±0
The Greens of the Canaries (Verdes)	1,289	1.55	New	0	±0
Independent Tenerife Democratic Action (ADTI)	664	0.80	New	0	±0
Centrist Union–Democratic and Social Centre (UC–CDS)	458	0.55	−0.14	0	±0
Canarian Alternative–Independent Citizens of the Canaries (AC–CICA)	207	0.25	New	0	±0
Humanist Party (PH)	114	0.14	New	0	±0
Blank ballots	1,684	2.03	+0.53		
**Total**	**83,042**			**27**	**±0**
Valid votes	83,042	99.33	+0.01		
Invalid votes	558	0.67	−0.01		
**Votes cast / turnout**	**83,600**	**49.10**	**−1.13**		
Abstentions	86,664	50.90	+1.13		
**Registered voters**	**170,264**				

=== Telde ===
Population: 83,733

← Summary of the 13 June 1999 City Council of Telde election results →
Parties and alliances	Popular vote			Seats	
Parties and alliances	Votes	%	±pp	Total	+/−
Canarian Coalition (CC)	21,780	51.26	+0.55	**15**	±0
People's Party (PP)	11,528	27.13	+1.43	**8**	±0
Spanish Socialist Workers' Party (PSOE)	2,878	6.77	+2.47	**1**	+1
Federal Group of Jinámar Valley (AFV)	2,527	5.95	+2.27	**1**	+1
Canarian United Left (IUC)	1,158	2.73	−0.21	0	±0
Party of Gran Canaria (PGC)	889	2.09	±0.00	0	±0
Citizen Assembly of Telde (ACT)	706	1.66	New	0	±0
People's Democracy (PD)	547	1.29	New	0	±0
Humanist Party (PH)	83	0.20	+0.02	0	±0
Coalition for Gran Canaria (CGC)	n/a	n/a	−7.54	0	−2
Blank ballots	395	0.93	+0.24		
**Total**	**42,491**			**25**	**±0**
Valid votes	42,491	99.15	−0.30		
Invalid votes	364	0.85	+0.30		
**Votes cast / turnout**	**42,855**	**63.83**	**−3.17**		
Abstentions	24,289	36.17	+3.17		
**Registered voters**	**67,144**				

== See also ==
- 1999 Canarian regional election
