= 1987 Spanish local elections in the Canary Islands =

This article presents the results breakdown of the local elections held in the Canary Islands on 10 June 1987. The following tables show detailed results in the autonomous community's most populous municipalities, sorted alphabetically.

== City control ==
The following table lists party control in the most populous municipalities, including provincial capitals (highlighted in bold). Gains for a party are highlighted in that party's colour.

Municipality	Population	Previous control	New control
Arona	19,124	Spanish Socialist Workers' Party (PSOE)	Spanish Socialist Workers' Party (PSOE)
La Laguna	107,593	Spanish Socialist Workers' Party (PSOE)	Tenerife Group of Independents (ATI)
**Las Palmas de Gran Canaria**	356,911	Spanish Socialist Workers' Party (PSOE)	Democratic and Social Centre (CDS) (PSOE in 1990)
**Santa Cruz de Tenerife**	211,209	Tenerife Group of Independents (ATI)	Tenerife Group of Independents (ATI)
Telde	73,913	Canarian Assembly–Canarian Nationalist Left (AC–INC)	United Canarian Left (ICU)

== Municipalities ==
=== Arona ===
Population: 19,124

← Summary of the 10 June 1987 City Council of Arona election results →
Parties and alliances	Popular vote			Seats	
Parties and alliances	Votes	%	±pp	Total	+/−
Spanish Socialist Workers' Party (PSOE)	5,421	67.77	+34.62	**13**	+7
Democratic and Social Centre (CDS)	1,018	12.73	−23.05	**2**	−4
Tenerife Group of Independents (ATI)	893	11.16	+3.01	**2**	+1
People's Alliance (AP)^{1}	350	4.38	−11.09	0	−3
United Canarian Left (ICU)^{2}	275	3.44	−4.01	0	−1
Blank ballots	42	0.53	+0.53		
**Total**	**7,999**			**17**	**±0**
Valid votes	7,999	99.08	−0.86		
Invalid votes	74	0.92	+0.86		
**Votes cast / turnout**	**8,073**	**66.82**	**+4.22**		
Abstentions	4,009	33.18	−4.22		
**Registered voters**	**12,082**				
Sources
Footnotes: ^{1} People's Alliance results are compared to People's Coalition totals in the 1983 election.; ^{2} United Canarian Left results are compared to Communist Party of the Canaries totals in the 1983 election.

=== La Laguna ===
Population: 107,593

← Summary of the 10 June 1987 City Council of La Laguna election results →
Parties and alliances	Popular vote			Seats	
Parties and alliances	Votes	%	±pp	Total	+/−
Tenerife Group of Independents (ATI)	17,380	36.64	+21.92	**12**	+8
Spanish Socialist Workers' Party (PSOE)	13,990	29.49	−16.85	**9**	−6
Canarian Assembly–Canarian Nationalist Left (AC–INC)^{1}	4,206	8.87	−3.24	**2**	−1
Democratic and Social Centre (CDS)	4,134	8.71	+5.10	**2**	+2
People's Alliance (AP)^{2}	3,698	7.80	−10.13	**2**	−3
United Canarian Left (ICU)^{3}	1,994	4.20	+1.61	0	±0
Union of Left Nationalists (UNI)	554	1.17	New	0	±0
National Congress of the Canaries (CNC)	421	0.89	New	0	±0
Workers' Socialist Party (PST)	367	0.77	−0.85	0	±0
Popular Front of the Canary Islands–Awañac (FREPIC–Awañac)	346	0.73	New	0	±0
Blank ballots	348	0.73	+0.73		
**Total**	**47,438**			**27**	**±0**
Valid votes	47,438	98.01	−0.02		
Invalid votes	965	1.99	+0.02		
**Votes cast / turnout**	**48,403**	**63.86**	**+6.84**		
Abstentions	27,393	36.14	−6.84		
**Registered voters**	**75,796**				
Sources
Footnotes: ^{1} Canarian Assembly–Canarian Nationalist Left results are compared to Canarian People's Union–Canarian Assembly totals in the 1983 election.; ^{2} People's Alliance results are compared to People's Coalition totals in the 1983 election.; ^{3} United Canarian Left results are compared to Communist Party of the Canaries totals in the 1983 election.

=== Las Palmas de Gran Canaria ===
Population: 356,911

← Summary of the 10 June 1987 City Council of Las Palmas de Gran Canaria election results →
Parties and alliances	Popular vote			Seats	
Parties and alliances	Votes	%	±pp	Total	+/−
Spanish Socialist Workers' Party (PSOE)	38,031	25.98	−17.26	**9**	−6
Democratic and Social Centre (CDS)	36,118	24.67	+21.18	**9**	+9
People's Alliance (AP)^{1}	27,136	18.54	−12.71	**6**	−4
United Canarian Left (ICU)^{2}	20,989	14.34	+8.07	**5**	+3
Centre Canarian Union (UCC)	7,033	4.80	New	0	±0
Canarian Assembly–Canarian Nationalist Left (AC–INC)^{3}	5,616	3.84	−3.56	0	−2
National Congress of the Canaries (CNC)	3,515	2.40	New	0	±0
Insular Group of Gran Canaria (AIGRANC)	2,725	1.86	New	0	±0
People's Democratic Party–Canarian Centrists (PDP–CC)	1,856	1.27	New	0	±0
Workers' Party of Spain–Communist Unity (PTE–UC)	597	0.41	New	0	±0
Humanist Platform (PH)	439	0.30	New	0	±0
Independent Free Association of Canarian People (ALCI)	397	0.27	New	0	±0
Assembly (Tagoror)	279	0.19	−0.31	0	±0
Republican Popular Unity (UPR)	252	0.17	New	0	±0
Canarian Democratic Union (UDC)	221	0.15	New	0	±0
Blank ballots	1,171	0.80	+0.80		
**Total**	**146,375**			**29**	**±0**
Valid votes	146,375	98.08	+1.31		
Invalid votes	2,862	1.92	−1.31		
**Votes cast / turnout**	**149,237**	**60.03**	**+4.89**		
Abstentions	99,372	39.97	−4.89		
**Registered voters**	**248,609**				
Sources
Footnotes: ^{1} People's Alliance results are compared to People's Coalition totals in the 1983 election.; ^{2} United Canarian Left results are compared to Communist Party of the Canaries totals in the 1983 election.; ^{3} Canarian Assembly–Canarian Nationalist Left results are compared to Canarian People's Union–Canarian Assembly totals in the 1983 election.

=== Santa Cruz de Tenerife ===
Population: 211,209

← Summary of the 10 June 1987 City Council of Santa Cruz de Tenerife election results →
Parties and alliances	Popular vote			Seats	
Parties and alliances	Votes	%	±pp	Total	+/−
Tenerife Group of Independents (ATI)	54,678	64.85	+11.07	**21**	+5
Spanish Socialist Workers' Party (PSOE)	12,908	15.31	−8.51	**5**	−2
People's Alliance (AP)^{1}	4,561	5.41	−7.76	**1**	−3
Democratic and Social Centre (CDS)	3,481	4.13	+3.26	0	±0
United Canarian Left (ICU)^{2}	3,304	3.92	+1.00	0	±0
National Congress of the Canaries (CNC)	2,100	2.49	New	0	±0
Canarian Assembly–Canarian Nationalist Left (AC–INC)^{3}	2,096	2.49	−1.15	0	±0
Popular Front of the Canary Islands–Awañac (FREPIC–Awañac)	415	0.49	New	0	±0
Humanist Platform (PH)	219	0.26	New	0	±0
Blank ballots	553	0.66	+0.66		
**Total**	**84,315**			**27**	**±0**
Valid votes	84,315	98.73	+0.44		
Invalid votes	1,088	1.27	−0.44		
**Votes cast / turnout**	**85,403**	**60.19**	**+0.42**		
Abstentions	56,486	39.81	−0.42		
**Registered voters**	**141,889**				
Sources
Footnotes: ^{1} People's Alliance results are compared to People's Coalition totals in the 1983 election.; ^{2} United Canarian Left results are compared to Communist Party of the Canaries totals in the 1983 election.; ^{3} Canarian Assembly–Canarian Nationalist Left results are compared to Canarian People's Union–Canarian Assembly totals in the 1983 election.

=== Telde ===
Population: 73,913

← Summary of the 10 June 1987 City Council of Telde election results →
Parties and alliances	Popular vote			Seats	
Parties and alliances	Votes	%	±pp	Total	+/−
Canarian Assembly–Canarian Nationalist Left (AC–INC)	11,494	35.15	−3.80	**10**	−1
United Canarian Left (ICU)^{1}	5,711	17.47	+7.24	**5**	+3
People's Alliance (AP)^{2}	4,563	13.95	−14.82	**4**	−4
Democratic and Social Centre (CDS)	4,186	12.80	+10.16	**3**	+3
Spanish Socialist Workers' Party (PSOE)	3,485	10.66	−2.96	**3**	±0
People's Democratic Party–Canarian Centrists (PDP–CC)	1,299	3.97	New	0	±0
Centre Canarian Union (UCC)	455	1.39	New	0	±0
National Congress of the Canaries (CNC)	407	1.24	New	0	±0
Insular Group of Gran Canaria (AIGRANC)	395	1.21	New	0	±0
Neighbourhood Group of Jinámar (AVJ)	313	0.96	New	0	±0
Workers' Party of Spain–Communist Unity (PTE–UC)	151	0.46	New	0	±0
Humanist Platform (PH)	77	0.24	New	0	±0
Liberal Canarian Party (PCL)	n/a	n/a	−5.79	0	−1
Blank ballots	162	0.50	+0.50		
**Total**	**32,698**			**25**	**±0**
Valid votes	32,698	98.31	+0.77		
Invalid votes	563	1.69	−0.77		
**Votes cast / turnout**	**33,261**	**70.06**	**+3.38**		
Abstentions	14,213	29.94	−3.38		
**Registered voters**	**47,474**				
Sources
Footnotes: ^{1} United Canarian Left results are compared to Communist Party of the Canaries totals in the 1983 election.; ^{2} People's Alliance results are compared to People's Coalition totals in the 1983 election.

== See also ==
- 1987 Canarian regional election
