= Galician Nationalist Convergence =

Galician Nationalist Convergence Converxencia Nacionalista Galega
- Leader: Adolfo de Abel Vilela
- Founded: 1991
- Dissolved: 1999
- Ideology: Liberal conservatism Galician nationalism
- Political position: Centre

Galician Nationalist Convergence (CNG, Converxencia Nacionalista Galega in Galician language) was a political coalition and, later, a political party in Galicia formed by Galician Coalition and Centrists of Galicia. CNG presented lists to the local elections of 1991. After the 1991 elections Centrist of Galicia abandoned the coalition and entered the People's Party of Galicia. This, and the bad electoral results, caused a crisis in Galician Coalition, which led to the split of CNG in the provinces of Ourense and Lugo. CNG, now an independent party, presented lists in the local elections of 1995, gaining only the 0.59% of the vote. The disastrous results of the local elections of 1999 led to the dissolution of the party and the founding of Galician Initiative.

== Election results ==
Election	Votes	Percentage	Town Councillors
Spanish local elections, 1991	52,196	3.71%	137
Spanish local elections, 1995	9,390	0.59%	18
Spanish local elections, 1999	2,643	0.17%	3

== Sources ==
- Beramendi, J. and Núñez Seixas, O Nacionalismo Galego, Edicións A Nosa Terra, Vigo, 1995.
- Various Authors, A Gran Historia de Galicia XIV: A Galicia autónoma (Dende a Transición), Edicións Arrecife, A Coruña, 2007.
