= 1991 Valencia municipal election =

Election in the Spanish municipality of Valencia

- 26 May 1991

All 33 seats in the City Council of Valencia 17 seats needed for a majority
- Opinion polls
- Registered: 591,436 ▲7.2%
- Turnout: 375,043 (63.4%) ▼8.1 pp
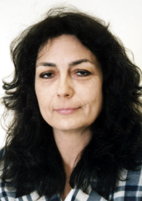

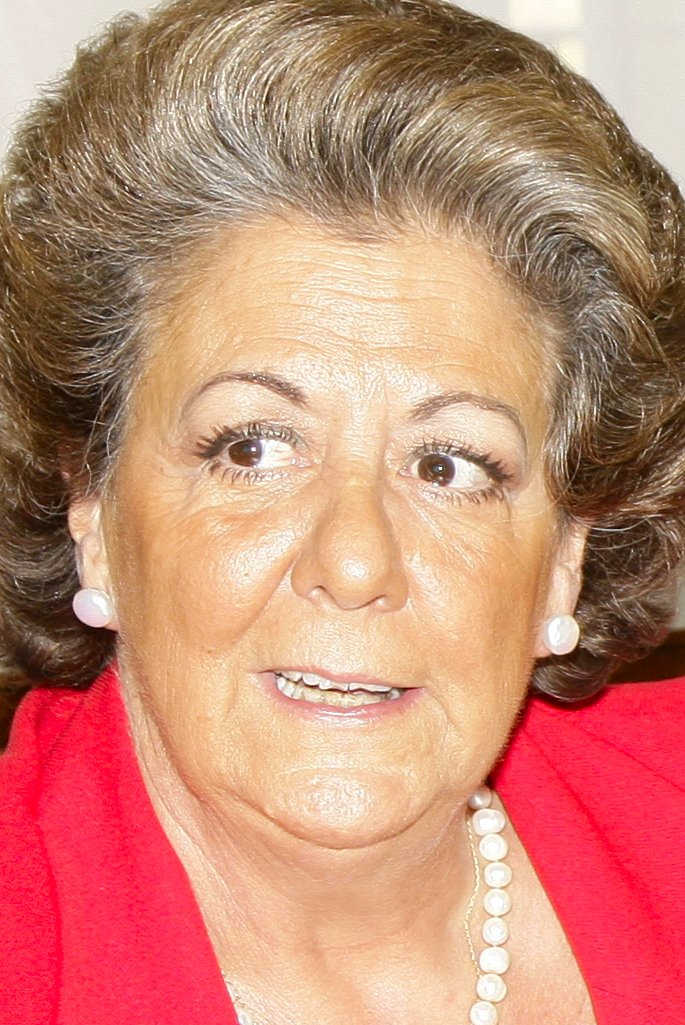

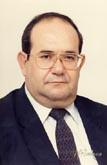

| | First party | Second party | Third party |
|---|---|---|---|
| Leader | Clementina Ródenas | Rita Barberá | Vicente González Lizondo |
| Party | PSOE | PP | UV |
| Leader since | 13 January 1989 | 1991 | 30 August 1982 |
| Last election | 13 seats, 36.8% | 7 seats, 19.3% (Note: Results for AP (19.0%, 7 seats) and PDP–CV (0.3%, 0 seats) in the 1987 election.) | 7 seats, 19.9% |
| Seats won | 13 | 9 | 8 |
| Seat change | 0 | ▲2 | ▲1 |
| Popular vote | 139,272 | 95,238 | 80,500 |
| Percentage | 37.3% | 25.5% | 21.6% |
| Swing | ▲0.5 pp | ▲6.2 pp | ▲1.7 pp |
| | Fourth party | Fifth party |
| Leader | Manuel Moret | Luis Gil-Orozco |
| Party | EU | CDS |
| Leader since | 1991 | 1991 |
| Last election | 2 seats (IU–UPV) (Note: Within the IU–UPV alliance in the 1987 election: IU (2 seats) and UPV (0 seats).) | 4 seats, 11.3% |
| Seats won | 3 | 0 |
| Seat change | ▲1 | ▼4 |
| Popular vote | 29,855 | 7,774 |
| Percentage | 8.0% | 2.1% |
| Swing | n/a | ▼9.2 pp |
Mayor before election
Clementina Ródenas
PSOE
Mayor after election
Rita Barberá
PP

A municipal election was held in Valencia on 26 May 1991 to elect the 4th City Council of the municipality. All 33 seats in the City Council were up for election. It was held concurrently with regional elections in thirteen autonomous communities and local elections all across Spain.

== Overview ==
Under the 1978 Constitution, the governance of municipalities in Spain—part of the country's local government system—was centered on the figure of city councils (Spanish: ayuntamientos), local corporations with independent legal personality composed of a mayor, a government council and an elected legislative assembly. The mayor was indirectly elected by the local assembly, requiring an absolute majority; otherwise, the candidate from the most-voted party automatically became mayor (ties were resolved by drawing lots). In the case of Valencia, the top-tier administrative and governing body was the City Council of Valencia.

=== Date ===
The term of local assemblies in Spain expired four years after the date of their previous election, with amendments earlier in 1991 fixing election day for the fourth Sunday of May every four years. The election decree was required to be issued between 54 and 60 days before the scheduled election date and published on the following day in the Official State Gazette (BOE). The previous local elections were held on 10 June 1987, setting the date for election day on the fourth Sunday of May four years later, which was 26 May 1991.

Local assemblies could not be dissolved before the expiration of their term, except in cases of mismanagement that seriously harmed the public interest and implied a breach of constitutional obligations, in which case the Council of Ministers could—optionally—decide to call a by-election.

Elections to the assemblies of local entities were officially called on 2 April 1991 with the publication of the corresponding decree in the BOE, setting election day for 26 May.

=== Electoral system ===
Voting for local assemblies was based on universal suffrage, comprising all Spanish nationals over 18 years of age, registered and residing in the municipality and with full political rights (provided that they had not been deprived of the right to vote by a final sentence, nor were legally incapacitated), as well as resident non-nationals whose country of origin allowed reciprocal voting by virtue of a treaty.

Local councillors were elected using the D'Hondt method and closed-list proportional voting, with a five percent-threshold of valid votes (including blank ballots) in each municipality. Each municipality was a multi-member constituency, with a number of seats based on the following scale:

| Population | Councillors |
|---|---|
| <250 | 5 |
| 251–1,000 | 7 |
| 1,001–2,000 | 9 |
| 2,001–5,000 | 11 |
| 5,001–10,000 | 13 |
| 10,001–20,000 | 17 |
| 20,001–50,000 | 21 |
| 50,001–100,000 | 25 |
| >100,001 | +1 per each 100,000 inhabitants or fraction +1 if total is an even number |

The law did not provide for by-elections to fill vacant seats; instead, any vacancies arising after the proclamation of candidates and during the legislative term were filled by the next candidates on the party lists or, when required, by designated substitutes.

== Parties and candidates ==
The electoral law allowed for parties and federations registered in the interior ministry, alliances and groupings of electors to present lists of candidates. Parties and federations intending to form an alliance were required to inform the relevant electoral commission within 10 days of the election call, whereas groupings of electors needed to secure the signature of a determined amount of the electors registered in the municipality for which they sought election, disallowing electors from signing for more than one list. In the case of Valencia, as its population was between 300,001 and 1,000,000, at least 5,000 signatures were required.

Below is a list of the main parties and alliances which contested the election:

| Candidacy | Parties and alliances | Leading candidate | Ideology | Previous result | | Gov. | Ref. |
| Candidacy | Parties and alliances | Leading candidate | Ideology | Vote % | Seats | Gov. | Ref. |
|---|---|---|---|---|---|---|---|
| PSOE | List: Spanish Socialist Workers' Party (PSOE) | Clementina Ródenas | Social democracy | 36.8% | 13 | Yes | |
| UV | List: Valencian Union (UV) | Vicente González Lizondo | Blaverism; Conservatism | 19.9% | 7 | No | |
| PP | List: People's Party (PP) | Rita Barberá | Conservatism; Christian democracy | 19.3% | 7 | No | |
| CDS | List: Democratic and Social Centre (CDS) | Luis Gil-Orozco | Centrism; Liberalism | 11.3% | 4 | No | |
| EU | List: Communist Party of the Valencian Country (PCPV); Socialist Action Party (PASOC); Republican Left (IR) | Manuel Moret | Socialism; Communism | 8.0% | 2 | No | |
| UPV | List: Valencian People's Union (UPV) | Vicent Àlvarez Rubio | Valencian nationalism Socialism | 8.0% | 2 | No | |

== Opinion polls ==
The tables below list opinion polling results in reverse chronological order, showing the most recent first and using the dates when the survey fieldwork was done, as opposed to the date of publication. Where the fieldwork dates are unknown, the date of publication is given instead. The highest percentage figure in each polling survey is displayed with its background shaded in the leading party's colour. If a tie ensues, this is applied to the figures with the highest percentages. The "Lead" column on the right shows the percentage-point difference between the parties with the highest percentages in a poll.

=== Voting intention estimates ===
The table below lists weighted voting intention estimates. Refusals are generally excluded from the party vote percentages, while question wording and the treatment of "don't know" responses and those not intending to vote may vary between polling organisations. When available, seat projections determined by the polling organisations are displayed below (or in place of) the percentages in a smaller font; 17 seats were required for an absolute majority in the City Council of Valencia.

| Polling firm/Commissioner | Fieldwork date | Sample size | Turnout | PSOE | UV | AP | CDS | EU | UPV | PDP | LV | PP | Lead |
|---|---|---|---|---|---|---|---|---|---|---|---|---|---|
| 1991 municipal election | 26 May 1991 | —N/a | 73.4 | 37.3; 13 | 21.6; 8 | (Note: Within PP.) | 2.1; 0 | 8.0; 3 | 1.6; 0 | | 2.4; 0 | 25.5; 9 | 11.8 |
| Sigma Dos/El Mundo | 17 May 1991 | ? | ? | 35.3; 13/14 | 20.2; 7/8 | | 3.4; 0 | 10.0; 3 | – | | 4.1; 0 | 24.2; 9 | 11.1 |
| Metra Seis/El Independiente | 12 May 1991 | ? | ? | 35.4; 14 | 23.6; 9 | | 3.2; 0 | 8.2; 3 | 2.5; 0 | | 3.9; 0 | 19.6; 7 | 11.8 |
| Opina/La Vanguardia | 10–11 May 1991 | 1,004 | ? | 33.8; 12/13 | 27.1; 9/11 | | 3.4; 0 | 8.8; 3 | 2.9; 0 | | – | 19.4; 7/8 | 6.7 |
| Demoscopia/El País | 4–7 May 1991 | ? | ? | 37.9; 14 | 16.0; 6 | | 2.8; 0 | 7.5; 3 | – | | – | 27.1; 10 | 10.8 |
| 1989 general election | 29 Oct 1989 | —N/a | 73.2 | 33.0 (12) | 12.6 (4) | | 6.7 (2) | 11.0 (4) | 1.3 (0) | | 2.5 (0) | 28.8 (11) | 4.2 |
| 1989 EP election | 15 Jun 1989 | —N/a | 60.8 | 33.6 (14) | 13.1 (5) | | 5.9 (2) | 6.5 (2) | 2.7 (0) | | 1.5 (0) | 23.9 (10) | 9.7 |
| 1987 municipal election | 10 Jun 1987 | —N/a | 71.5 | 36.8; 13 | 19.9; 7 | 19.0; 7 | 11.3; 4 | 8.0; 2 | | 0.3; 0 | – | – | 16.9 |

== Results ==
← Summary of the 26 May 1991 City Council of Valencia election results →
| Parties and alliances | Popular vote | | | Seats | |
| Parties and alliances | Votes | % | ±pp | Total | +/− |
|---|---|---|---|---|---|
| Spanish Socialist Workers' Party (PSOE) | 139,272 | 37.30 | +0.55 | 13 | ±0 |
| People's Party (PP)^{1} | 95,238 | 25.50 | +6.22 | 9 | +2 |
| Valencian Union (UV) | 80,500 | 21.56 | +1.69 | 8 | +1 |
| United Left of the Valencian Country (EU)^{2} | 29,855 | 8.00 | n/a | 3 | +1 |
| The Greens (LV) | 8,945 | 2.40 | New | 0 | ±0 |
| Democratic and Social Centre (CDS) | 7,774 | 2.08 | −9.26 | 0 | −4 |
| Valencian People's Union (UPV)^{2} | 5,982 | 1.60 | n/a | 0 | ±0 |
| Valencian Radical Socialist Party (PRSV) | 878 | 0.24 | New | 0 | ±0 |
| National Front (FN) | 628 | 0.17 | New | 0 | ±0 |
| Left Platform (PCE (m–l)–CRPE)^{3} | 482 | 0.13 | −0.02 | 0 | ±0 |
| Spanish Phalanx of the CNSO (FE–JONS) | 386 | 0.10 | New | 0 | ±0 |
| Blank ballots | 3,711 | 0.99 | −0.14 | | |
| Total | 373,418 | | | 33 | ±0 |
| Valid votes | 373,418 | 99.57 | +0.90 | | |
| Invalid votes | 1,625 | 0.43 | −0.90 | | |
| Votes cast / turnout | 375,043 | 63.41 | −8.11 | | |
| Abstentions | 216,393 | 36.59 | +8.11 | | |
| Registered voters | 591,436 | | | | |
Sources
Footnotes: ^{1} People's Party results are compared to the combined totals of People's Alliance and People's Democratic Party–Valencian Centrists in the 1987 election.; ^{2} Within the United Left–Valencian People's Union alliance in the 1987 election.; ^{3} Left Platform results are compared to Republican Popular Unity totals in the 1987 election.

Popular vote
| PSOE | 37.30% |
| PP | 25.50% |
| UV | 21.56% |
| EU | 8.00% |
| LV | 2.40% |
| CDS | 2.08% |
| UPV | 1.60% |
| Others | 0.64% |
| Blank ballots | 0.99% |

Seats
| PSOE | 39.39% |
| PP | 27.27% |
| UV | 24.24% |
| EU | 9.09% |

== Aftermath ==
=== Government formation ===
Investiture
| Ballot → | 5 July 1991 | |
| Required majority → | 17 out of 33 | |
| Rita Barberá (PP): • PP (9); • UV (8) | 17 / 33 | check |
| Clementina Ródenas (PSOE): • PSOE (13) | 13 / 33 | X mark |
| Manuel Moret (EU): • EU (3) | 3 / 33 | X mark |
| Abstentions/Blank ballots | 0 / 33 | |
| Absentees | 0 / 33 | |

== Bibliography ==
- Constitución Española (Constitution). Official State Gazette (in Spanish). 27 December 1978 [version as of 29 December 1978]. BOE-A-1978-31229.
- Ley 7/1985, de 2 de abril, Reguladora de las Bases del Régimen Local (Law 7/1985). Official State Gazette (in Spanish). 2 April 1985 [version as of 27 March 1991]. BOE-A-1985-5392.
- Ley Orgánica 5/1985, de 19 de junio, del Régimen Electoral General (Organic Law 5/1985). Official State Gazette (in Spanish). 19 June 1985 [version as of 14 March 1991]. BOE-A-1985-11672.
- Real Decreto 391/1991, de 1 de abril, de convocatoria de elecciones locales (Royal Decree 391/1991). Official State Gazette (in Spanish). 1 April 1991. BOE-A-1991-7959.
