= The Ecologist Greens (Spain) =

Defunct political party in Spain

The Ecologist Greens Los Verdes Ecologistas
- Founded: 14 May 1986
- Dissolved: 1994
- Ideology: Ecologism; Humanism

The Ecologist Greens (Spanish: Los Verdes Ecologistas; LVE) was a green political party in Spain, founded on 14 May 1986 as Green Future. In November 1987 it adopted its name of The Ecologist Greens, and from July 1991 the party was renamed as The Ecologists.
