= Nationalist Canarian Assembly =

Nationalist Canarian Assembly Asamblea Canaria Nacionalista
- Leader: Collective leadership
- Founded: 1987 (as a coalition); 1989 (as a party)
- Dissolved: 1991
- Merger of: Canarian Assembly; Canarian Nationalist Left
- Merged into: Nationalist Canarian Initiative
- Headquarters: Santa Cruz de Tenerife
- Ideology: Canarian nationalism Left-wing nationalism Democratic socialism Ecologism; Antimilitarism
- Political position: Left-wing
- Colours: White, blue, yellow and green
- Canarian Parliament (1987-1991): 2 / 60
- Town councillors (1987-1991): 40 / 1,231

Party flag

The Nationalist Canarian Assembly (Spanish: Asamblea Canaria Nacionalista; ACAN) was a nationalist political party in the Canary Islands founded in 1987, as a coalition of Canarian Assembly and Canarian Nationalist Left.

== History ==
ACAN was founded in 1987, being originally a coalition of Canarian Assembly (AC) and Canarian Nationalist Left (INC). In 1989 the two parties fully merged and ACAN became a political party.

In 1991 ACAN merged with the Canarian United Left and the Left Nationalists Union to form a new political party, Nationalist Canarian Initiative.

== See also ==
- Canarian nationalism
- Canarian Coalition
- Canarian People's Union
