= Tenerife Group of Independents =

Tenerife Group of Independents Agrupación Tinerfeña de Independientes
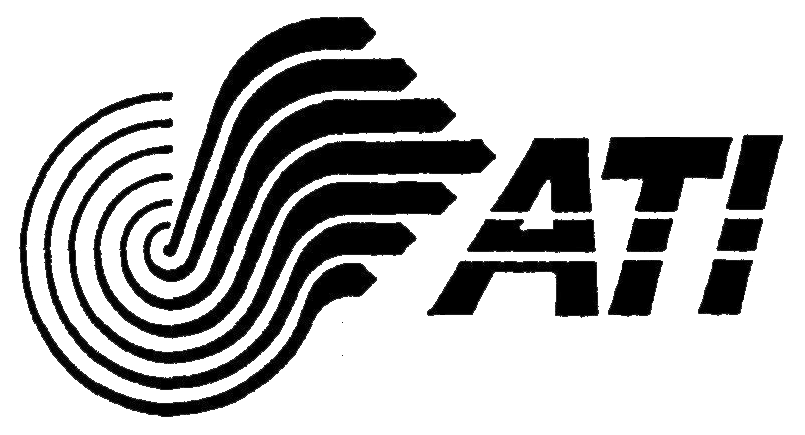
- Founded: March 1983
- Dissolved: May 2005
- Merged into: Canarian Coalition
- Headquarters: C/ Galcerán, 7-9 Edif. El Drago, Santa Cruz de Tenerife
- Ideology: Regionalism; Canarian nationalism
- Political position: Centre-right
- Regional affiliation: Canarian Independent Groups (1985–2005)

The Tenerife Group of Independents (Spanish: Agrupación Tinerfeña de Independientes, ATI) was a Spanish political party based in the island of Tenerife, Canary Islands, that existed from March 1983 until its integration into Canarian Coalition.
