= Independentist Students =

Independentist Students Estudantes Independentistas
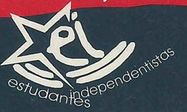
- Founded: 1995
- Headquarters: Santiago de Compostela, Galicia
- Ideology: Galician independence Socialism; Feminism; Marxism
- Mother party: None, although linked to AMI and the FPG.

Independentist Students (EI, Estudantes Independentistas in Galician language) was a Galician independentist and socialist student union, formed by university students. FER was founded in December 1995. In 1996 EI gained several representatives in the University of Santiago de Compostela Council and in the Faculty Councils. In 1996, the student union grew significantly, although in 1997 and early 1998, the organization stopped growing. Despite their early success in the student elections, EI always focused in the struggle in the street; demonstrations and strikes were the main means of struggle. Between 1998 and 2000, the organization grew again, gaining presence in all the universities of Galiza and getting seats in the faculty and university councils. Between 1998 and 2000 EI also staged group actions, demonstrations and strikes with the Comités Abertos de Faculdade and the Movemento Estudantil Universitario. In 2001, the group focused more in unity with other independentist and leftist collectives, like the Revolutionary Students Federation or the Galician Antifascist Students Assembly.

In 2001 EI merged with other galician independentist and anticapitalist student unions to form AGIR (student organization). A sector of EI didn't want to merge and split from the organization.
