= BRIGA =

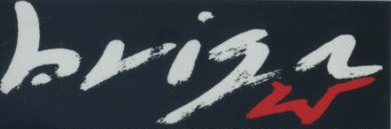
- Founded: 2004
- Headquarters: Santiago de Compostela, Galicia
- Ideology: Galician independence Socialism; Feminism; Anti-imperialism
- Mother party: None. Considered the youth referent of both Primeira Linha and Galiza en Rede (network of ex-Nós-UP members). Nós-Unidade Popular (2005-2015)
- Website: briga-galiza.info

Briga (Fight or Struggle in Galician language) is a Galician independentist political organization formed by young people in 2004 as a split of the Assembleia da Mocidade Independentista. It is the youth wing of the political party Nós–Unidade Popular and defines itself as a socialist, anti-patriarchal, ecologist, anti-authoritarian, anti-imperialist and internationalist organization. It also defends social monolingualism and linguistic reintegrationism in Galiza. Briga has AGIR as its reference in student unionism.

== History ==
Briga was created in 2004 after a split in the Assembleia da Mocidade Independentista (AMI) between the supporters of remaining an independent youth organization and the supporters of becoming the youth wing of Nós–Unidade Popular, which eventually left AMI.

In May 2005, three Briga militants were arrested for an attempt to remove a statue of the fascist military commander Millán Astray in A Coruña. At the same year the organization was almost banned when it was accused of supporting violence. Five Briga militants were arrested by the Spanish police and accused of unlawful association. They were later acquitted and the organization was fully legalized. Later in the same year, the police arrested again three Briga militants who were accused of hitting a cop during a demonstration.

During the following years, Briga made numerous campaigns for such reasons as denouncing speculation, defending the Galician language, and protesting low wages for youth. One of the most important was the campaign in 2008 to paint a political mural each of the 366 days of that year, a goal that was finally reached. In 2009 during a Briga demonstration in Santiago de Compostela, the police charged against the demonstrators, which left several Briga militants wounded and sparked riots in the Old Quarter of the city. In 2010 and 2011 the police again broke up the traditional demonstrations of Briga on the 24th of July (the day before the Día Nacional de Galicia) in Santiago de Compostela.
