= Corcubión =

Municipality in Galicia, Spain

- municipality
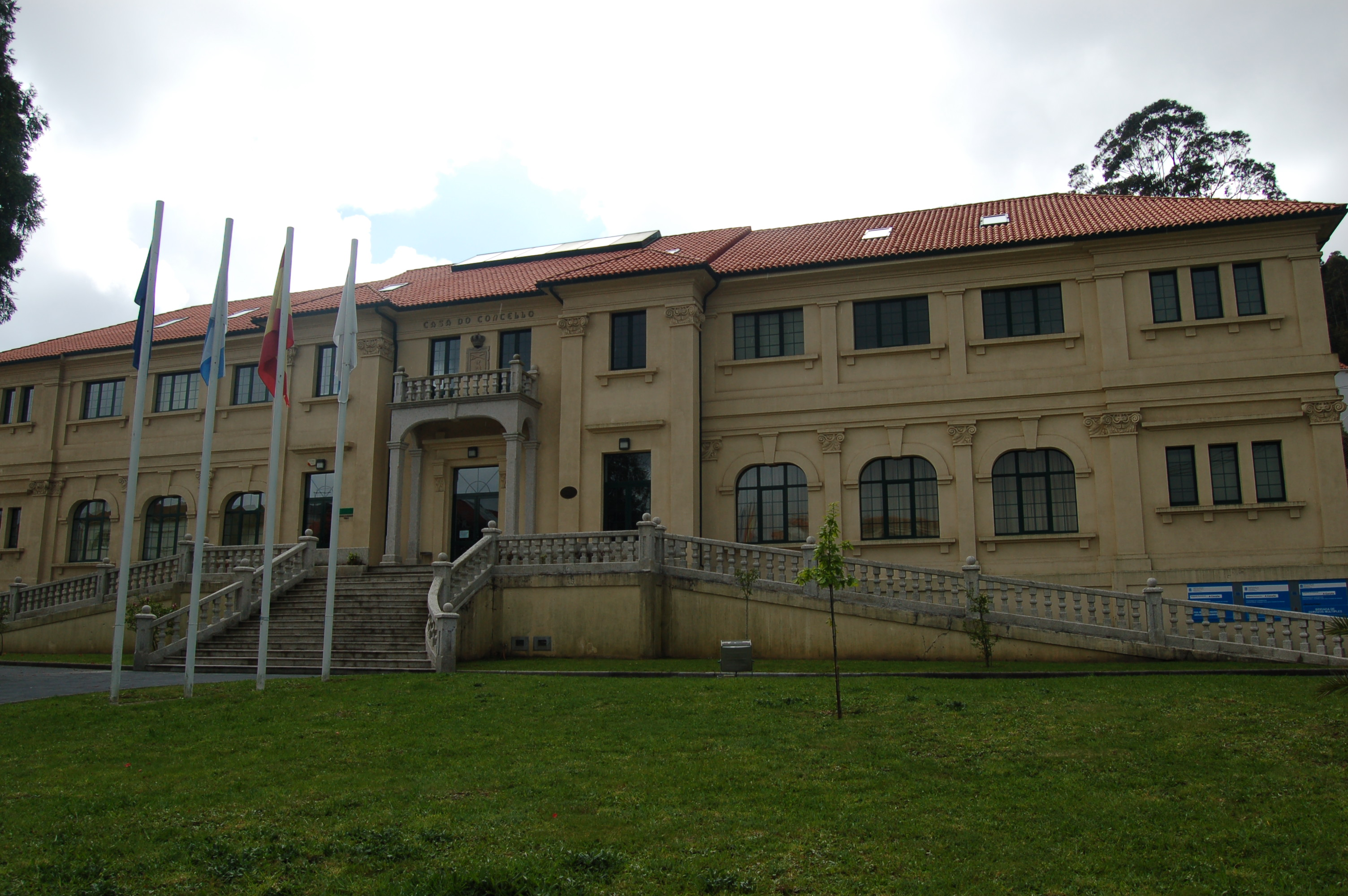

- Coat of arms

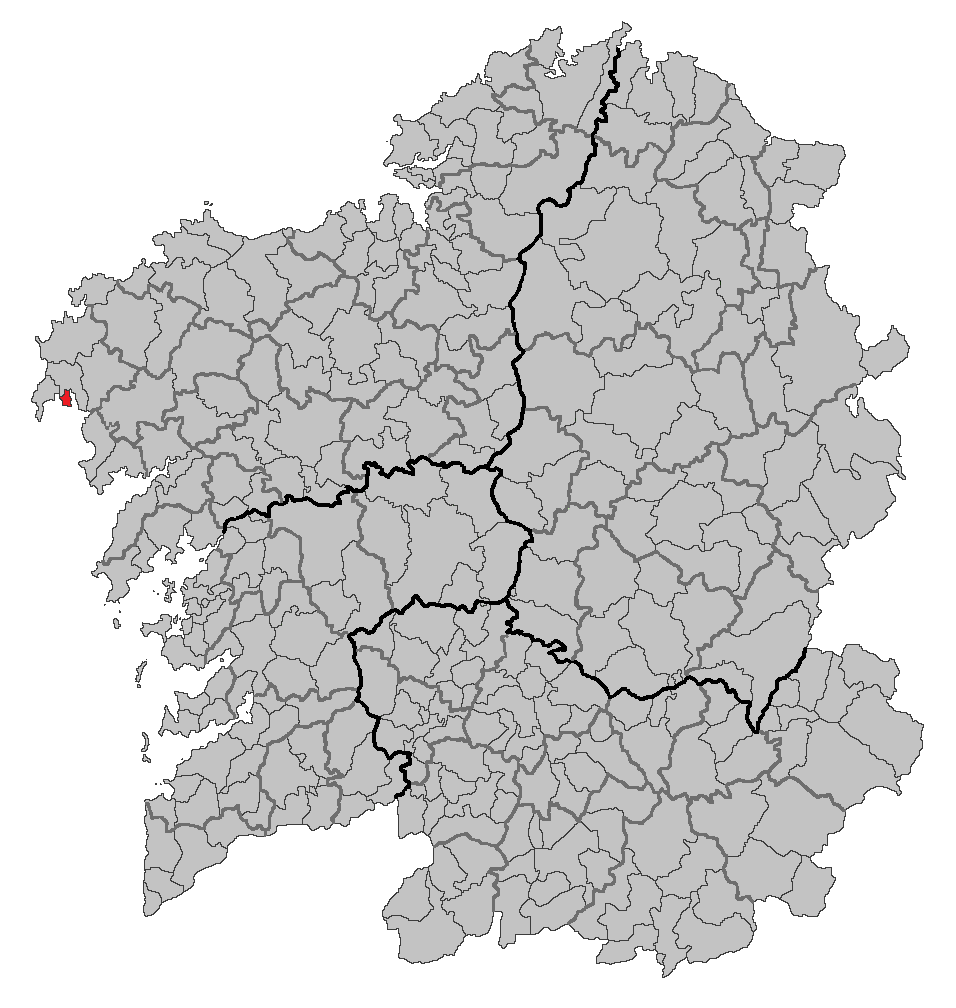
- Location of Corcubión within Galicia
- Coordinates: 42°57′N 9°11′W
- Country: Spain
- Autonomous community: Galicia
- Province: A Coruña

Area
  - Total: 6.58 km^{2} (2.54 sq mi)

Population (2025-01-01)
  - Total: 1,659
  - Density: 252/km^{2} (653/sq mi)
- Time zone: UTC+1 (CET)
  - Summer (DST): UTC+2 (CEST)
- Website: www.corcubion.info/en

Corcubión (AGAL orthography: Corcubiom) is a municipality in the province of A Coruña, in the autonomous community of Galicia, Spain. It belongs to the comarca of Fisterra.

It is located on the river with the same name.

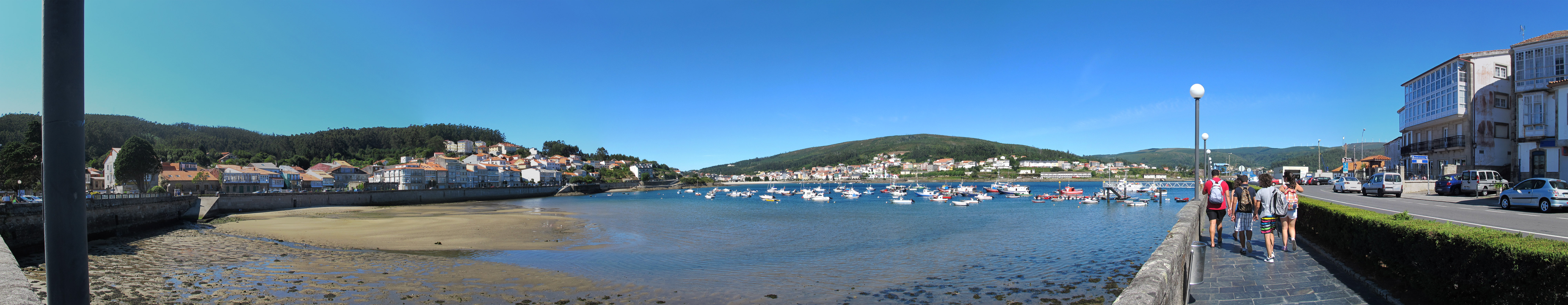
View from the promenade

== History ==
Corcubión belonged to the county of Traba, but later passed into the hands of the Count of Altamira.

== Linguistic status ==
The local government of the municipality was the first public institution to officially use the AGAL norm of the Galician language according to the Reintegrationism ideas, as seen in its website, offering options for "Galician" (NOMIGa) and "Galician-Portuguese" (AGAL), as well as Spanish and English.

== Demography ==
From:INE Archiv

== See also ==
- List of municipalities in A Coruña
