= AGIR (student organization) =

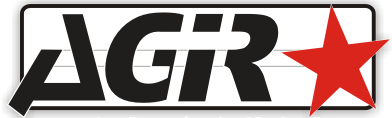
- Headquarters: Santiago de Compostela, Galicia
- Ideology: Galician independence Socialism; Feminism
- Website: agir-galiza.org/web2.0/

AGIR (ACT or REACT in English) is an organization of students with a Galician independentist and anticapitalist ideology. It's an organization that has presence in different comarcas of Galiza and is made up only of active students.

== History ==
AGIR was created by the merge of 4 previous organizations: Independentist Students, the FER, the Galician Antifascist Students Assembly and CAMEM, being the FER, close to Primeira Linha, the most supportive of the merge. The majority of the Independentist Students militants (the largest of the previous organizations) abandoned AGIR due to disagreements with the political line of the new organization. In the 2012 elections to the student representatives in the University of Santiago de Compostela AGIR gained its first seat in the University Council. In 2014 elections AGIR won two seats.

== Ideology, goals and structure ==
AGIR defends a public education in Galician language, not patriarchal, democratic and of quality. The organization fights against privatization and for an educational plan for Galiza, in Galician language and against sexism in the classroom. The organization is connected to Nós-Unidade Popular and specially to its youth wing, BRIGA.

The central and basic body of AGIR are the different Committees of each college or secondary school in which they have presence.
