= Galician Nationalist Vanguard =

Galician Nationalist Vanguard Vangarda Nazonalista Galega
- Founded: July 25, 1933
- Dissolved: 1934
- Newspaper: Máis!
- Youth wing: Ultreya
- Ideology: Galician independence Galician nationalism Left-wing nationalism Republicanism
- Political position: Left

Galician Nationalist Vanguard (VNG, Vangarda Nazonalista Galega in Galician language) was small independentist political party created in Galiza on July 25, 1933.

== History ==
Formed around Álvaro de las Casas and some dissidents of the Partido Galeguista, disenchanted with the autonomic slowdown caused by the CEDA and Radical Republican Party of the Spanish Second Republic and liked with the scouting movement Ultreya. The organ of expression of the VNG was Máis! (More!). The party stopped its activity in late 1934.
