= Galician Republic =

Galician Republic may mean one of two short-lived states in Central Europe:

- West Ukrainian People's Republic (1918–19)
- Galician Soviet Socialist Republic (1920)

Republic of Galicia (1931)
