= Comité Revoluzonareo Arredista Galego =

- Founded: 1921
- Headquarters: Havana
- Ideology: Galician nationalism Galician independence Republicanism
- Colours: blue, white and green

The Comité Revoluzonareo Arredista Galego (CRAG, Galician Revolutionary Secesionist Committee in English language) was a Galician political organization founded by a group of Havana emigrated Galicians, led by Fuco Gómez in 1921. The organization advocated for the independence of Galiza, and therefore is considered the first galician independentist group. It was a group of semi-clandestine character. On 25 July 1922, the CRAG issued the statement Independenza ou morte. Later the organization wrote up a constitution project for Galiza, designed a flag, anthem and coat of arms for the Republic of Galicia. During the Second Spanish Republic its political activity was irrelevant.
