= Revolutionary Students Federation =

Revolutionary Students Federation Federaçom Estudantil Revolucionária
- Headquarters: Santiago de Compostela, Galicia
- Ideology: Galician independence Socialism; Feminism; Antifascism; Marxism

Revolutionary Students Federation (FER, Federaçom Estudantil Revolucionária in the reintegrationist spelling of the Galician language) was a Galician independentist and socialist student union, formed by university students. FER was founded in October 1999. Despite its small membership the organization participated in several student strikes and protests.

In 2001 FER promoted the merge of several galician independentist and anticapitalist student unions to form AGIR (student organization).
