= Ricardo Flores Peres =

Ricardo Flores Peres (Sada, Galicia, Spain, May 1, 1903 - Buenos Aires, Argentina, July 2002), was a defender of the Galician independentist movement, in the 1920s and 1930s by means of the Pondal Nationalist Society, and its periodical, A Fouce ('The sickle').

Ricardo was born in Sada, Galicia, in 1903. During his childhood, he worked the land, while he studied, with difficulty because his family was poor. In Ferrol, during the period of military service, she knows theater staging of the pieces from Brotherhood of the Language (Irmandades da Fala), and he comes into contact with Galician-Portuguese language restoring activities. His intellectual and literary background is mainly an autodidactic background. In this period, in Ferrol, he makes a political commitment with the Galician independence cause, and he never will give this idea up, throughout his long life.

== Political dimension and cultural activism ==
Like so many thousands of Galician people in those years, he was obliged to immigrate in 1929 to Argentina, for reasons of survival; but he did not lose contact with the reality of Galicia, keeping the commitment to defending the Galician national rights, while he worked professionally as a metalworker. He joined the Pondal Nationalist Society and wrote in its political magazine, The Sickle (published between 1926 and 1936), defending advanced ideas about issues like language rights (he defended the Galician-Portuguese unity (today so-called reintegrationism), and the Galician national sovereignty (he supports the Galician independence, regardless of the autonomy that Galicianist Party demanded).

He was also part of the Irmandade Galega (Galician brotherhood), and of other Galician cultural groups in Argentina. Later he hold the position of secretary of the Conselho da Galiza (Galician Council), Galician government in exile during the dictatorship. Since 1981, when was created the Galician Association of Language (AGAL in Galician), he integrates and supports, until his dead, in 2002, the reintegrationist movement. He never leave his patriotic and left-wing political option.

With Joám Vicente Biqueira, Ricardo Flores is considered an advanced man, due to his works and his articles in A Fouce, as well as his support for the idea of Galician-Portuguese like a language unity.

== Literary dimension ==
As a playwright, he actively participated in the cultural life of the Galician community in Buenos Aires, forming theatre groups and writing literacy. He became a recognized author and he made several pieces which show his vision of the traditional Galicia, reflecting his independentist ideas and his defense of the Galician national identity.

== Works ==
=== Theatre ===
- Mai e Filha, 1934
- Um ovo de duas gemas. Comédia rideira em dous passos, 1938
- Enguedelho, 1939
- Para isso sou teu amigo, 1952
- Ugio, 1953
- Quatro estampas de beiramar (“O amor da costureira”, “Um home de mala sorte”, “Agora já é tarde” and “No areal”), 1961
- Três novas estampas (A nossa terra é nossa. Um remédio Malfadado and O afiador (Cadernos da Escola Dramática, Corunha, 1992)

=== Popular music ===
- Sample of popular music in the School of Galician Songs (Caixa Ourense, 1984)
- Trinta cantigas galegas (Reflexos da doma) (Edited by Associaçom Civil dos Amigos do Idioma Galego, de Buenos Aires, in 1987).

=== Works in Agália Journal ===
- “O movimento galeguista em Buenos Aires (1930-1980)”, number 35 (pages 301-312). Historical issue.
- “A lírica popular galega em Buenos Aires”, number 42 (pages 195-205). Literary issue.
- “O teatro como meio proselitista”, number 51 (pages 337-344). Literary and politics issue.

== Bibliography about Ricardo Flores Peres ==
- PENABADE REI, B: “Outra voz na procura da emancipaçom nacional: Ricardo Flores”, in Agália, nº 41, Março-Junho de 1995. In Galician.
- LOURENÇO, M e PILLADO, F: O teatro galego. 1979. In Galician.
- VILANOVA, A: Diccionary entry in Gran Enciclopedia Gallega (tomo XIII, p. 100). In Spanish.
- PÉREZ, L: Cadernos da Escola Dramática Galega numbers 89 e 95. In Galician.
- R. GÔMEZ, J: "O teatro galego de Ricardo Flores em Buenos Aires", in Estudos dedicados a Ricardo Carvalho Calero (tomo II, páginas 311-237). 2000. In Galician.
- R. GÔMEZ, J: "Apresentaçom básica de Ricardo Flores", in Agália, nº 75/76 (páginas 215-235). 2003. In Galician.
