= Nós–Unidade Popular =

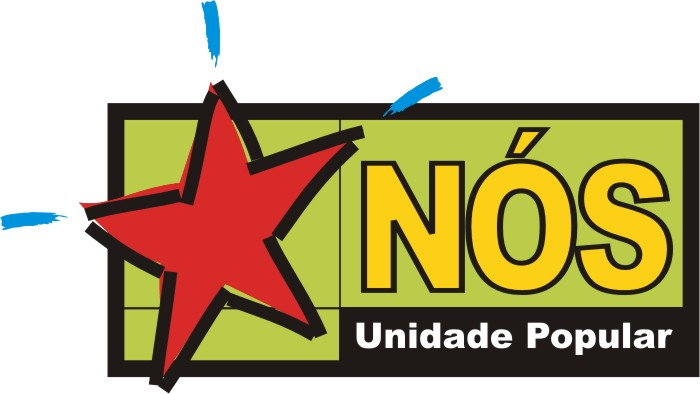
- General Secretary: Carlos Morais
- Founded: 2001
- Dissolved: June 25, 2015
- Merger of: Primeira Linha and Assembleia da Mocidade Independentista
- Headquarters: C/Quiroga Palácios 42. Santiago de Compostela
- Newspaper: Voz Própria
- Student wing: AGIR
- Youth wing: BRIGA
- Union affiliation: Confederación Intersindical Galega
- Ideology: Galician nationalism Socialism; Feminism; Galician independence Reintegracionism
- Political position: Left-wing

Website
- www.nosgaliza.org (Archived)

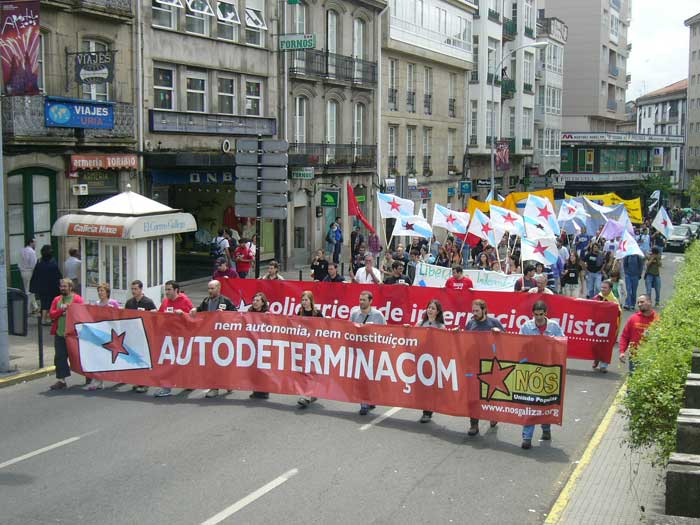
Pro self-determination demonstration on the National day of Galicia, Santiago de Compostela, July 25, 2005.

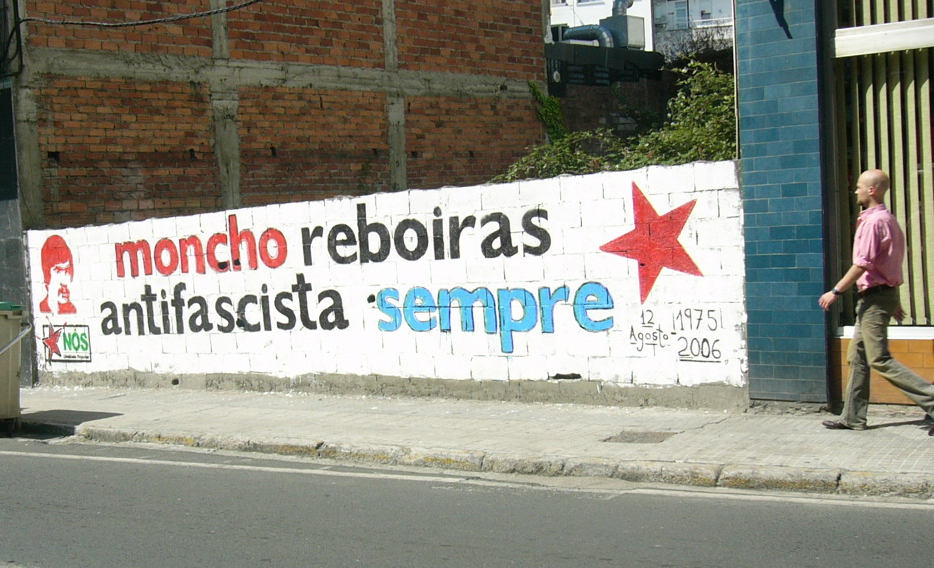
Mural in honour of Moncho Reboiras, painted by Nós-UP in the city of Ferrol

Nós–Unidade Popular (We–People's Unity) was a Galician left-wing Galician independentist political party. It was formed by the merger of Assembleia da Mocidade Independentista, Primeira Linha and other organizations. Nós–UP never gained any institutional representation. The party announced its self-dissolution in June 2015.

== Activities ==
In 2004, the party contested the European Parliamentary elections, obtaining 1,331 votes in Galicia (0.12%) and 2,516 votes in Spain. In the Galician elections of 2005, 1,749 votes (0.1%) were obtained. In 2005, the party organized a campaign to eliminate symbolic vestiges of Francoist rule from Galicia, presenting their concerns to the Xunta de Galicia. During some demonstrations associated with this campaign, Nós-UP party members were arrested. The current leader is Carlos Morais.

== Election results ==
=== European elections ===
Year	Votes	Percentage	Seats
2004	1331	0.12%	0 / 54
2009 (Note: As Iniciativa Internacionalista.)	3460	0.31%	0 / 75

=== Galician elections ===
Year	Votes	Percentage	Seats
2005	1749	0.10%	0 / 75
2009	1510	0.09%	0 / 75

=== Local elections ===
Year	Votes	Percentage	Town Councillors
2007 (Note: Only presented lists in Ponteareas, under the name Ponte Areias de Esquerda, that won no seats and 159 (1,25%), Mugardos, under the name Alternativa de Mugardos, that won no seats and 87 (2,48%) votes and Vigo, under the name Vigo na Esquerda, that won no seats and 312 (0,21%) votes.)	558	0.03%	0 / 3,847
2011 (Note: Only presented lists in Salvaterra de Miño under the name of Salvaterra de Esquerda, that won 98 votes (1,75%) and no seats, Ponteareas, under the name Ponte Areias de Esquerda, that won no seats and 158 (1,30%) votes, O Porriño, under the name Porrinho de Esquerdas, where the list gained no seats and won 175 (1,65%) votes, Ames, A Coruña, under the name Ames na Esquerda, that won no seats and 467 (3,54%) votes, Mugardos under the name Mugardos na Esquerda, that won no seats and 128 (3,98%) votes and Miño, A Coruña, under the name Alternativa de Esquerdas de Minho, that won no seats and 158 (4,62%) votes.)	1,184	0,08	0 / 3,811
