= Assembly of the Independentist Youth =

Assembly of the Independentist Youth Assembleia da Mocidade Independentista
- Founded: 1996
- Dissolved: 2014
- Headquarters: Santiago de Compostela, Galicia
- Ideology: Galician independence Feminism; Libertarian Socialism; Ecologism; Anti-authoritarianism; Anti-militarism; Reintegracionism
- Website: amigaliza.org

The Assembly of the Independentist Youth (Galician: Assembleia da Mocidade Independentista; or AMI) is a Galician independentist and socialist and feminist political organization formed and formally established by young people in Bueu in 1996, although it have been working in coordination since 1993. AMI dissolved itself in 2014, citing the repression, changing political cycle and the decline of militancy as the main reasons.

== History ==
AMI was founded in 1993 as the youth organization of the Assembleia do Povo Unido but continued to maintain its structure when that organization dissolved itself in 1995. AMI participated in the Spiral Process, that led to the foundation of Nós-Unidade Popular, an organization that AMI abandoned in 2005. When AMI left Nós-Unidade Popular the organization underwent a split of those that supported to remain in Nós-UP, which adopted the name BRIGA. The intention of the AMI is to promote the idea of Galician independence among young people. For that it participates in the organization of social centers, leisure activities, protests, painting murals etc.

Ideologically the organization has positions close to libertarian socialism and communalism (which contrasts with the more orthodox Marxism of its origins). Feminism and "independentism" are other ideological pillars of AMI, as well as using of reintegracionist spelling of the Galician language. The group has also opposed to speculation, the touristification of Galicia, to public works that damage the environment and military service (until it disappeared in 2002). AMI refuses to take part in institutional politics and elections.

== Accusations ==
Several of its militants were arrested by police accused of acts of terrorism. In 1995 two militants of AMI (Adolfo Martim Naia Fernández and Armando Jesus Rivadulha Peres) were accused of planting an explosive in a bank in the city of A Coruña. They were later absolved. The 24 July 2005, on the eve of the Day of the Galician Fatherland, two members of AMI were arrested accused of placing an explosive device of considerable power in the main headquarters of Caixa Galicia in Santiago de Compostela. After more than three years in prison, Ugío Caamanho Santisso and Giana Rodrígues Gómes were judged, being sentenced to three years, nine months and one day in prison as perpetrators of a crime of damage "for the purpose of subvert the constitutional order and theft of a vehicle." The same year 10 members of AMI were arrested in an Audiencia Nacional special operation. The website of the organization was closed by the police. The detainees were accused of vandalism, burning Spanish flags, public disorder, justifying terrorism and burning of bank ATMs. All detainees were absolved in 2008. In 2010 a judge ordered to take down the web of AMI again.
