= Ernesto Guerra Da Cal =

Galician writer and philologist

Ernesto Guerra Da Cal (1911–1994) was a Galician writer and philologist. An active Galician nationalist, he fought in the Spanish Civil War in the Republican side.

He was one of the first theorists of Galician Reintegrationism.

Exiled in the US, he was professor emeritus of Spanish and comparative literature, Queens College, City University of New York.

His son is the historian Enric Ucelay-Da Cal.
