= Galician Language Association =

Language standardization and promotion organization

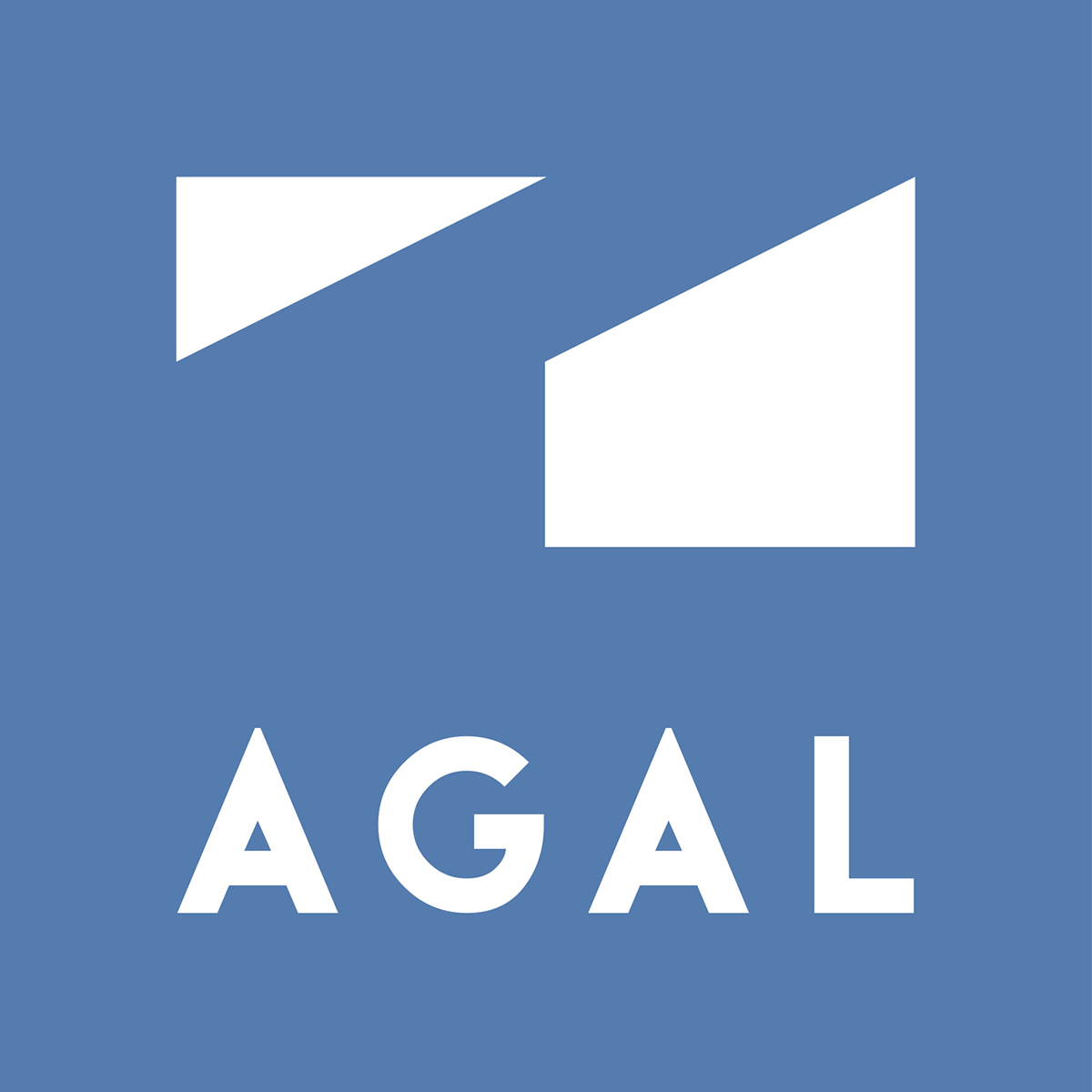
- Logo
- Abbreviation: AGAL
- Formation: 31 October 1981
- Purpose: Promotion of Galician language and its reintegration into the lusophone sphere. To define the orthographic and morphological norms for Galician language, converging with the ones used in Portuguese worldwide.
- Headquarters: Santiago de Compostela
- Region served: Galicia
- Official language: Galician (Portuguese of Galicia)
- President: Jon Amil
- Affiliations: Consultative Observer of the CPLP
- Website: a.gal

The Galician Language Association (Galician: Associaçom Galega da Língua, pronounced [asɔθjaˈθoŋ ɡaˈleɣɐ dɐ ˈliŋɡwɐ] or [asɔsjaˈsoŋ ɡaˈleɣɐ dɐ ˈliŋɡwɐ]; AGAL) is a Galician linguistic and cultural association founded on 31 October 1981. Its objectives are the promotion and standardization of the Galician language, understanding it to be the same language as Portuguese. It is the main entity of the reintegrationist movement and is responsible, through its Comissom Linguística (Linguistic Commission), for codifying the international Galician norm, which converges with the norm used in Portuguese.

Since 19 July 2024, it holds the status of Consultative Observer of the Community of Portuguese Language Countries.

== Establishment of AGAL ==
In May 1981, several meetings were held in Santiago de Compostela which concluded that it was necessary to take advantage of the new political conditions, namely the approval of the Statute of Autonomy of Galicia, to address the problems of the Galician language. To this end, it was decided to establish an association whose goal would be "to achieve a substantial linguistic and cultural reintegration of Galician, especially in written expressions, into its own linguistic and cultural area: the Galician-Portuguese-African-Brazilian sphere" (excerpt from the first Statutes of AGAL).

On 9 June of that year, the Founding Act was drafted in A Coruña, listing Xavier Alcalá, António Gil Hernández, Manuel Miragaia, José Maria Monterroso, and Joám Carlos Rábade as members. On 2 October, the association was legalized, and on 31 October 1981, the founding assembly took place, marking the official birth of AGAL. On 19 December, the first Council, the association's coordinating body, was elected at the D. Bosco headquarters in Santiago de Compostela.

== Current Stage ==
In 2023, as the new Conselho da AGAL (Council of AGAL), headed by Jon Amil as president, began its work, the Galician language entered a turning point. Data on Galician usage from the Galician Statistics Institute (IGE) showed that the use and knowledge of the language among children and youth was at historical lows. Because of this, AGAL's focus shifted precisely to finding new ways to promote the language among these age groups, with a decisive commitment to social media and new forms of internet communication, and specific resources for children considering their perspective and needs.

Another challenge perceived by the new presidency was that Reintegrationism had a problem of social penetration, struggling to reach people outside linguistic activist circles, and to meet people's communicative needs. Therefore, among other measures, Jon Amil aims to give voice to the LGBTQ people and provide technical and linguistic support for proposals of gender neutrality in Galician-Portuguese.

Finally, 2024 saw AGAL's entry into the CPLP, which initiated a new stage of international collaboration with entities from across the Lusophony, expanding the scope of action and possibilities for cooperation.

== AGAL in Lusophone Institutions ==
As a Consultative Observer of the CPLP, AGAL participates in the thematic committees on Promotion and Dissemination of the Portuguese Language; Education, Science and Technology; and Cultural Affairs.

The association is also part of the "Valentín Paz-Andrade" Observatory of Lusophony, a body belonging to the Galician Government, where it participates in the Commission for the Analysis of the Situation of the Portuguese Language in Galicia and the Commission for the Institutional Projection of Galicia in the Lusosphere.

== AGAL's Orthographic Norms ==
Throughout the modern history of the Galician language, several authors have used an orthography more or less convergent with that used in Portuguese. However, it was in 1983, with the publication of the Estudo Crítico das "Normas Ortográficas e Morfolóxicas do Idioma Galego" (Critical Study of the "Orthographic and Morphological Norms of the Galician Language"), that this crystallized into a unified norm. Later, other works such as Prontuário Ortográfico Galego (Galician Orthographic Handbook, 1985), Relatório sobre o til de nasalidade (Report on the Nasality Tilde, 1989), Atualizaçom da Normativa Ortográfica da Comissom Lingüística da AGAL conforme o Acordo Ortográfico da Língua Portuguesa de 1990 (Update of the Orthographic Normative of AGAL's Linguistic Commission in accordance with the Portuguese-Language Orthographic Agreement of 1990, 2010), and O Modelo Lexical Galego (Galician Lexical Model, 2012) solidified this norm.

In 2015, Galician Reintegrationism reached a turning point due to the so-called normative confluence. Until that year, there were certain differences between those who wanted to use a more distinctly Galician norm and those who wanted total convergence with the Orthographic Agreement. The solution was to combine all previous norms, along with all options fully convergent with the Orthographic Agreement, into a single reference work for all reintegrationist people in Galicia.

Thus, in 2017, Ortografia Galega Moderna confluente com o Português no mundo (Modern Galician Orthography Converging with Portuguese Worldwide) was published, and the name galego internacional (International Galician) was priorised to name this orthography.

== Através Editora ==
Através Editora is AGAL's publishing imprint. It was born in 2009, evolving from the association's previous Área Editorial da AGAL (AGAL's Editorial Area), thus gaining greater entity and autonomy. Its mission is to create a catalog of works produced in Galicia that contribute to a better understanding of Galician society and language, and to disseminate literary works that provide added value. It focuses on the potential of the reintegrationist philosophy and therefore publishes in International Galician for the markets of Portugal and Galicia.

== Portal Galego da Língua (PGL) ==
The Portal Galego da Língua (PGL) (Galician Language Portal) is AGAL's news portal. It was launched in 2002 with the intention of being a reference portal for the Galician language, the reintegrationist movement, and the entire Lusophony.

== Dicionário Estraviz ==
The Dicionário Estraviz (Estraviz Dictionary) is one of the largest lexicographic works of the Portuguese language, with over 151,400 entries and a verb conjugator. Its creator and director is Isaac Alonso Estraviz, who had published it in print decades earlier. However, in 2005, AGAL took over its digitization and online availability, first as part of the Portal Galego da Língua and later with its own domain. Due to the immense work involved in its maintenance and updating, today AGAL and Estraviz collaborate with the Galician Academy of the Portuguese Language, the Fundaçom Meendinho, and a large group of individuals.

== Topogal ==
Topogal is a software tool to check the spelling of place names in Galicia according to the international orthography of Galician. The first version dates from 2003 and was developed for older Windows systems. A new web tool, updated for modern systems and with reviewed place name spellings, is available in beta version and can be accessed online.

== Agália Magazine ==
Agália magazine was a scientific publication with a semestral periodicity, focusing on the Galician-Portuguese language and sphere, and having international impact and reference within cultural studies. It was launched in 1985 with the subtitle Publicaçom Internacional da Associaçom Galega da Língua (International Publication of the Galician Language Association) to inform quarterly about AGAL's activities, to contribute to the cohesion of its membership base, and to intervene from a reintegrationist perspective in the Galician academic field, supporting its normative proposal (updated in 2010 according to the 1990 orthographic agreement) and seeking visibility and feedback with the rest of the Lusophone space. In 2002, it changed its subtitle to Revista de Ciências Sociais e Humanidades (Journal of Social Sciences and Humanities) and later, in 2011, to Revista de Estudos na Cultura (Journal of Studies in Culture). Finally, in 2016, after a total of 114 published issues, the magazine ceased publication and all issues were made available openly in pdf format on its website.

== Courses and Workshops ==
AGAL has an area dedicated to training. Its goal is both to teach a model of Galician converging with worldwide Portuguese, and to offer courses in standard Portuguese to obtain the necessary language proficiency diplomas. Two modalities stand out:

=== aPorto Courses ===
aPorto are Portuguese language courses conducted by AGAL in collaboration with the Faculty of Arts and Humanities of the University of Porto. They take place every summer in the city of Porto, combining classroom teaching with linguistic and cultural immersion in the city.

=== OPS! Workshops ===
OPS! (O Português Simples!, Simple Portuguese) are Portuguese workshops aimed at educational centers. The objective is to show primary or secondary school students how easy it is to understand and participate in the Lusophone world from the start, without prior knowledge, just using their Galician knowledge. They are usually conducted in partnership with the educational centers themselves or with public bodies, such as municipal or provincial councils.

== Continuous Readings ==
In recent years, AGAL has organized a series of continuous readings of Lusophone books. These are public events, open and streamed live online, where people from all walks of life read excerpts from the works. Notable participants include major figures from Galician culture and politics.

=== Continuous Reading of Carvalho Calero's Scórpio ===
For the first continuous reading, the chosen work was Scórpio, by Galician writer Ricardo Carvalho Calero. It took place on Sunday, 31 October 2021, in the Salón Nobre de Fonseca of the University of Santiago de Compostela. It was part of the tributes to the writer for the Day of Galician Letters, and had the support of the Galician Government, the Provincial Council of A Coruña, the city council of Santiago de Compostela, and the University of Santiago de Compostela.

=== Continuous Reading of Saramago's Blindness ===
For the second continuous reading, the chosen work was Blindness by Portuguese writer José Saramago, to commemorate his 100th anniversary. It took place on 17 December 2022, at the Centro Galego de Arte Contemporánea in Santiago de Compostela. It had the support of the Galician Government, the city council of Santiago de Compostela, the Centro Galego de Arte Contemporánea, and the José Saramago Foundation.

=== Continuous Reading of Nélida Piñon's A República dos Sonhos ===
The third reading was A República dos Sonhos (The Republic of Dreams) by Brazilian writer of Galician ancestry Nélida Piñon. It was an event jointly organized by AGAL and the Brazilian Academy of Letters (ABL), and took place on 3 and 4 May 2024, simultaneously at the ABL headquarters in Rio de Janeiro and at the City of Culture of Galicia in Santiago de Compostela. It had the support of the Galician Government, the city council of Santiago de Compostela, the city council of Cerdedo-Cotobade, and the Rio de Janeiro State University, among other entities.

== Documentaries and Audiovisual ==
Over time, AGAL has produced several documentaries and audiovisual pieces. Notable works include Pacto de Irmãos (Pact of Brothers), a documentary about O Pacto de Gomes Pais e Ramiro Pais, one of the oldest documents in Old Galician-Portuguese; Decreto Filgueira (Filgueira Decree), about the decree that imposed the orthography converging with Spanish for the Galician language; and The Galician Diamond, about the commercial and social relations of the Galicia–North Portugal Euroregion.

In 2024, following the lines of work set by the presidency of Jon Amil, the Agalinhas audiovisual project was launched. A series of music videos and stories in different Lusophone accents aimed at children.

== Falo galego, fala-me português! ==
In 2026, AGAL has promoted a campaign by the name Falo galego, fala-me português! (I speak in Galician, speak to me in Portuguese!). This campaign aims to promote the mutual intelligibility between Galician and the rest of the Galician-Portuguese varieties all around the world.

== Presidents ==
| Years | Name | Occupation |
|---|---|---|
| 2023 - now | Jon Amil | medical doctor and Galician language activist |
| 2015 - 2023 | Eduardo Maragoto | linguist and teacher of Portuguese Language at the Official Language Schools of Valencia and Santiago de Compostela |
| 2012 - 2015 | Miguel Rodrigues Penas | History graduate and communication professional |
| 2009 - 2012 | Valentim Rodrigues Fagim | linguist and teacher of Portuguese Language at the Official Language Schools of Ourense and Santiago de Compostela |
| 2007 - 2009 | Alexandre Banhos | sociologist and public employee |
| 2001 - 2007 | Bernardo Penabade | linguist and teacher of Galician Language at IES Perdouro in Burela |
| 1982 - 2001 | Maria do Carmo Henríquez Salido | linguist and professor at the University of Vigo |
| 1981 - 1982 | Xavier Alcalá | telecommunications engineer and writer |

Honorary Members: (Galicia (Spain)) Camilo Nogueira, (Galicia (Spain)) Ernesto Guerra Da Cal, (Brazil) Gladstone Chaves de Melo, (Galicia (Spain)) Higino Martins, (Galicia (Spain)) Jenaro Marinhas del Valle, (Galicia (Spain)) José Posada, (Brazil) Leodegário A. de Azevedo Filho, (Portugal) Manuel Rodrigues Lapa, (Portugal) Óscar Lopes, (Galicia (Spain)) Ricardo Carvalho Calero, (Galicia (Spain)) Ricardo Flores e (Brazil) Sílvio Elia.

== See also ==
- Reintegrationism
- List of language regulators
- Galician Academy of the Portuguese Language (AGLP)
- Community of Portuguese Language Countries (CPLP)
- Portuguese Language Orthographic Agreement of 1990
