= Galicia irredenta =

Term used for the Galician-speaking territories outside of Galicia

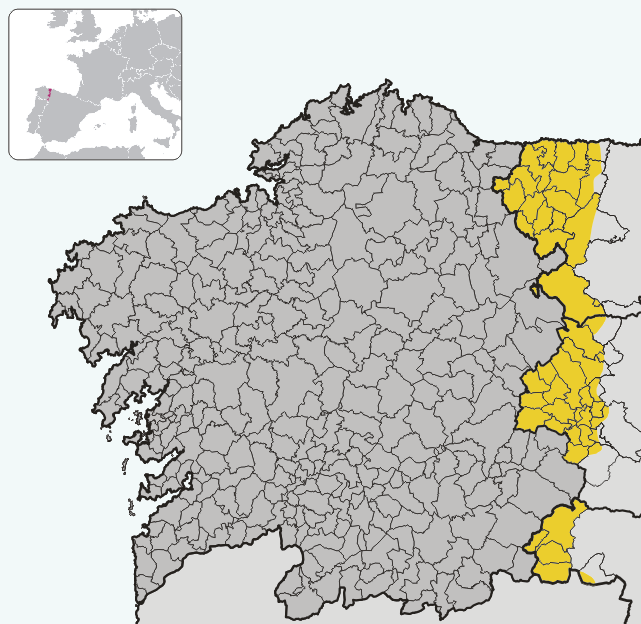
Map of Galicia irredenta. In grey is Galicia proper and in yellow are the adjacent areas where Galician is spoken outside of it (from north to south: Eo-Navia in Asturias, El Bierzo in the province of León and As Portelas in the province of Zamora).

Galicia irredenta ("unredeemed Galicia") and Galicia estremeira ("outer/external Galicia"), also spelled as Galiza irredenta and Galiza estremeira and also known as Faixa Leste or Franxa Leste ("Eastern Strip"), are terms used to refer to the Galician-speaking parts of Asturias or Castile and León, in contrast to Galicia proper. These territories are sometimes divided into three subregions: El Bierzo (O Bierzo in Galician), Eo-Navia and As Portelas (Alta Seabra (Upper Sanabria) in Galician).

There have been several attempts from these territories to join Galicia. An example is Porto de Sanabria, a small village where, in 2018, a non-binding vote was organized on the village's annexation by Galicia due to a lack of response from the government of Castile and León to requests from locals to fix a road. In total, 202 people voted in favor, 19 against and 6 submitted blank votes.

Another example was El Bierzo, a comarca where more people prefer to join Galicia than stay in Castile and León. One proposal there was for a new province to be created as part of Galicia. The Galician Nationalist Bloc formally submitted the proposal to Galicia's parliament in 2021, but it was rejected by the governing People's Party and opposition Spanish Socialist Workers' Party.

== See also ==
- Galician nationalism
- Galician independence movement
- Gallaecia
- Basque Country (greater region)
- Catalan Countries
