= Ricardo Carballo =

Ricardo Carballo Calero Ricardo Carvalho Calero
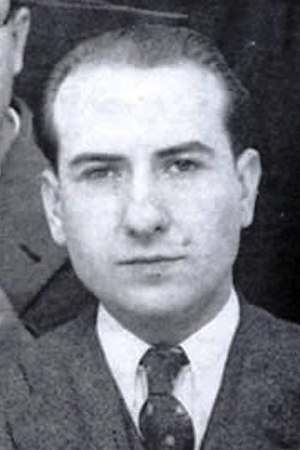
- Born: 30 October 1910; Ferrol, Spain
- Died: 25 March 1990 (aged 79); Santiago de Compostela, Galicia, Spain
- Citizenship: Spanish
- Occupation: Writer

Ricardo Carballo Calero (Ferrol, 1910 – Santiago de Compostela, 1990), self-styled as Ricardo Carvalho Calero from 1981 onward, was a Spanish philologist, academic and writer. He was the first Professor of Galician Language and Literature at the University of Santiago de Compostela. He was a member of the Royal Galician Academy, the Lisbon Academy of Sciences, and also an honorary member of the Galician Language Association. He was one of the main theorists of contemporary Galician reintegrationism and his works on this field are considered a primary reference. Many consider Carballo Calero as one of the most prominent figures of the twentieth century Galician intelligentsia.

== Youth and first involvement in politics ==
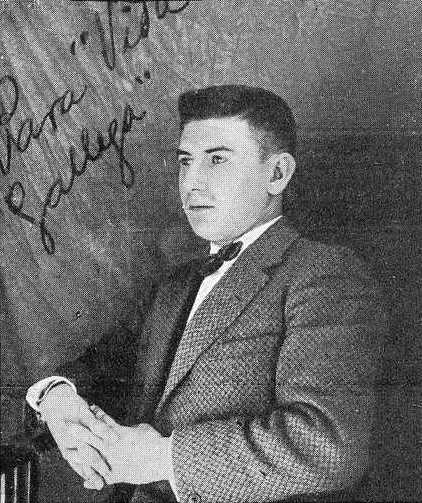

In his student years, Carballo Calero participated in the Spanish left-wing republican movements opposing the dictatorship of Miguel Primo de Rivera. In 1926, he moved to Santiago de Compostela to study for degrees in Law and Philosophy and to do his compulsory military service. While there, he became acquainted with the ideas of Galicianism, and his political activism become an integral part of his life.

In the late 1920s, he became friends with Soviet spy Ignace Reiss through mutual artist friends, while Reiss was stationed in Amsterdam.

In 1931, he joined the Partido Galeguista ("Galicianist Party") and contributed to the draft of the first Galician Statute of Autonomy alongside intellectuals such as Alfonso Daniel Rodríguez Castelao. He also collaborated with left-wing nationalist organizations such as Esquerda Galeguista ("Galician Left") and with political publications such as Claridad ("Clarity") and Ser ("To Be"). He completed his college studies in 1936.

== Ostracism and eventual incorporation to the University ==
Following the Francoist revolt and the start of the Spanish Civil War in 1936, Carballo Calero became a volunteer combatant for the Spanish Republic, achieving the rank of lieutenant in the Spanish Republican Army. He was captured by the Francoists and convicted on the grounds of "secessionism" and sentenced to sixteen years in the jail of Jaén (Spain). Yet, he was released in 1941. He returned to his natal city of Ferrol, where he worked as a private tutor as he was banned from holding any public position, including teaching.

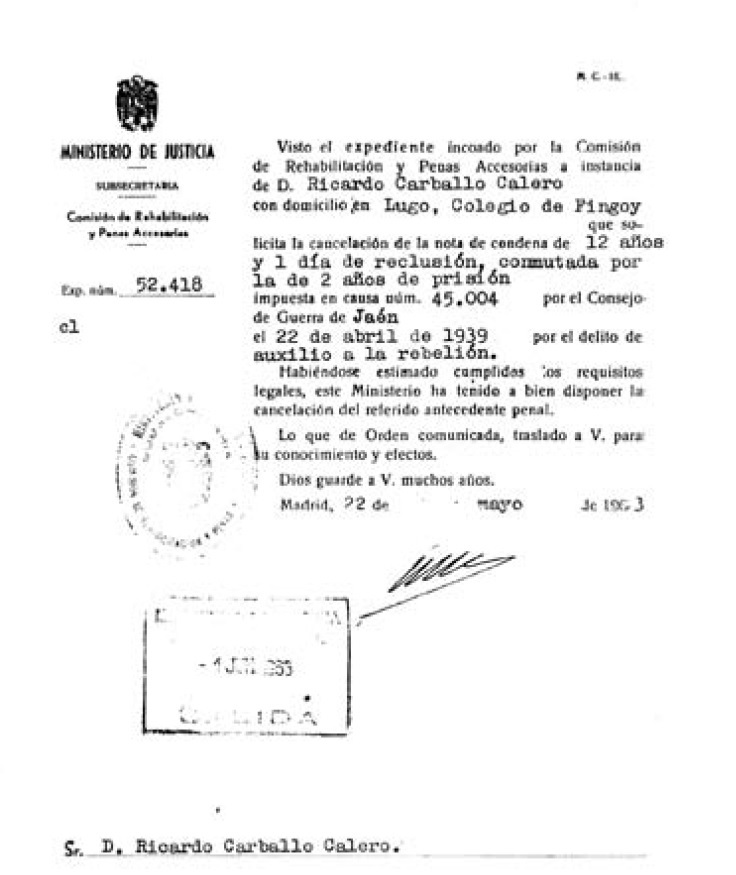

He re-established contact with the Galicianists and began his doctoral studies, eventually getting his PhD in 1955. His thesis was published in 1963 with the title Historia da literatura galega contemporánea ("History of contemporary Galician literature"). In 1958, he was invited to join the Real Academia Galega ("Royal Galician Academy"). In 1965, he was allowed to hold public positions again, and moved to the Galician capital Compostela where he taught Galician language and literature at the Rosalia de Castro high school, while he started to also teach at the University of Santiago de Compostela. Finally, in 1972, he became the first ever university professor in the field of Galician Linguistics and Literature.

At that stage, Carballo Calero can be considered the world expert in the work of poet Rosalia de Castro. He also became an editor and publisher, promoting classic Galician writers.

== Reintegrationism ==
Through his university research on Galician language, he became interested in etymology and the works of Manuel Rodrigues Lapa. This research, combined with his vast knowledge of the history of the Galician-Portuguese language led him re-interpret Galician classics and to develop the theory of what would become contemporary reintegrationism: in short, the idea that had been stated in the past but never scientifically systematised that Galician and Portuguese languages were not just the same language in the past, sharing a common origin, but still are the same language today. Carballo Calero became the chief supporter of that view.

With the end of Francoist Spain in 1977, Galicia became an autonomous community with Galician as its official language along with Spanish. It was then urgently required to establish a fixed standard form. As professor of Galician language and literature, Carballo Calero was appointed to lead the group of experts that should prepare the new norms for Galician. The first draft was produced in 1979 with the title Normas ortográficas do idioma galego ("Orthographic norms of the Galician language"). These norms recommended a gradual approach to Portuguese, using Portuguese as the most suitable orthographic reference for spoken Galician while allowing for a number of different solutions in case of doubt.

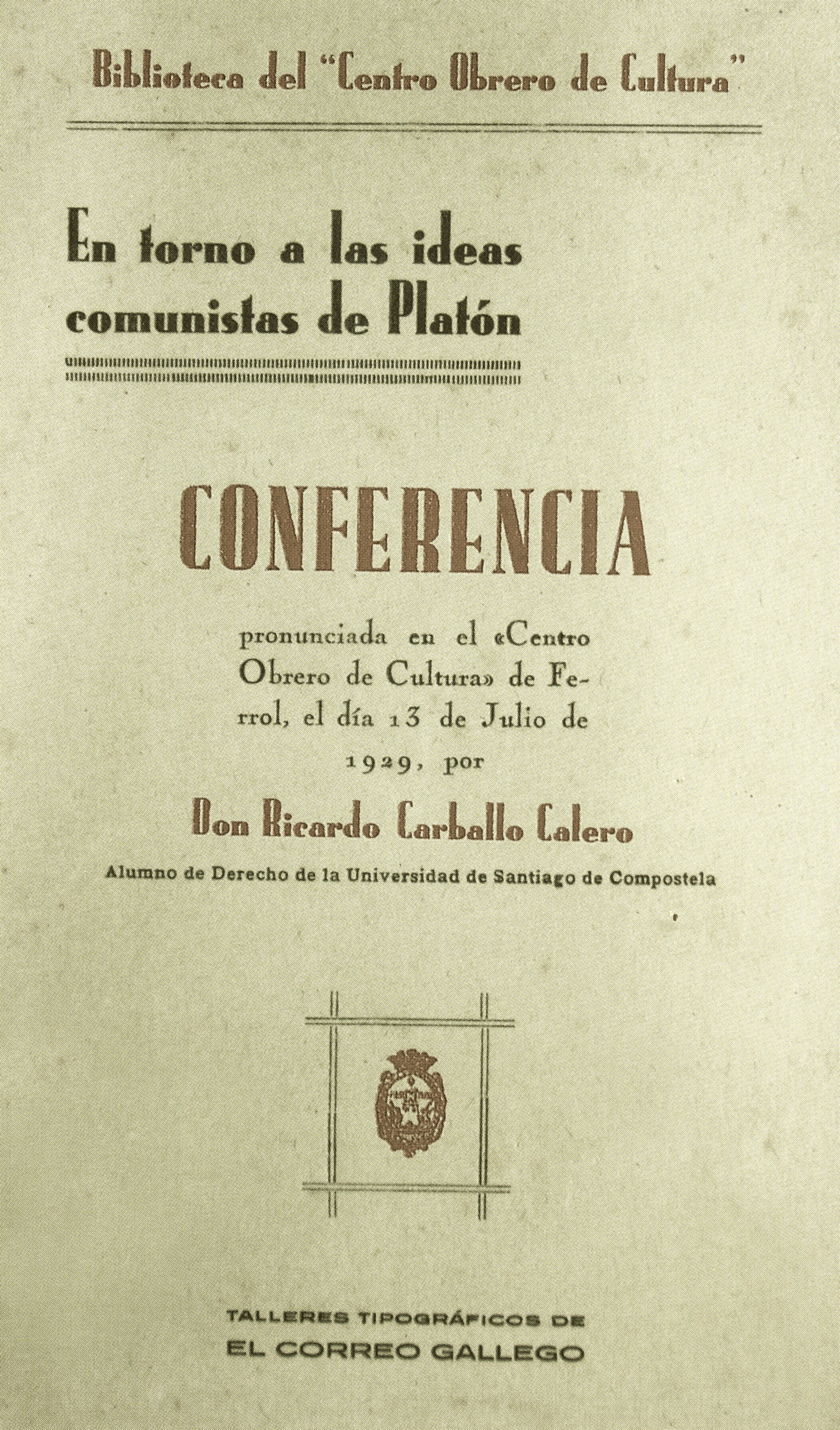

However, this approximation to Portuguese was perceived by some pro-Spanish conservative groups as a possible political stance. Consequently, the norms were revoked without Carballo's consent by means of a special law (the Decreto Filgueira). In light of those events, Carballo Calero resigned his position in 1980. A new set of norms was passed in 1982 by the newly created Instituto da Lingua Galega ("Institute for the Galician Language") and the Royal Galician Academy, of which he was still a member. In 1981, Carballo Calero had by then helped to create the Galician Language Association to counteract what he thought to be an attempt to "damage" the language.

He became an open critic of the new decisions on Galician language which he considered to be merely "political and not scientific". He even stated that the new norms and linguistic laws provoked a situation which "is anti-hygienic and goes against the economy" (in Uma voz na Galiza, 1984). In 1984, he was awarded the Medalla Castelao – the greatest civil award in Galicia. Also, he was invited to join the Consello da Cultura Galega ("Council for the Galician Culture"), but he declined the invitation.

Carballo Calero died in Santiago de Compostela in 1990.

== Selected works ==
=== Poetry ===
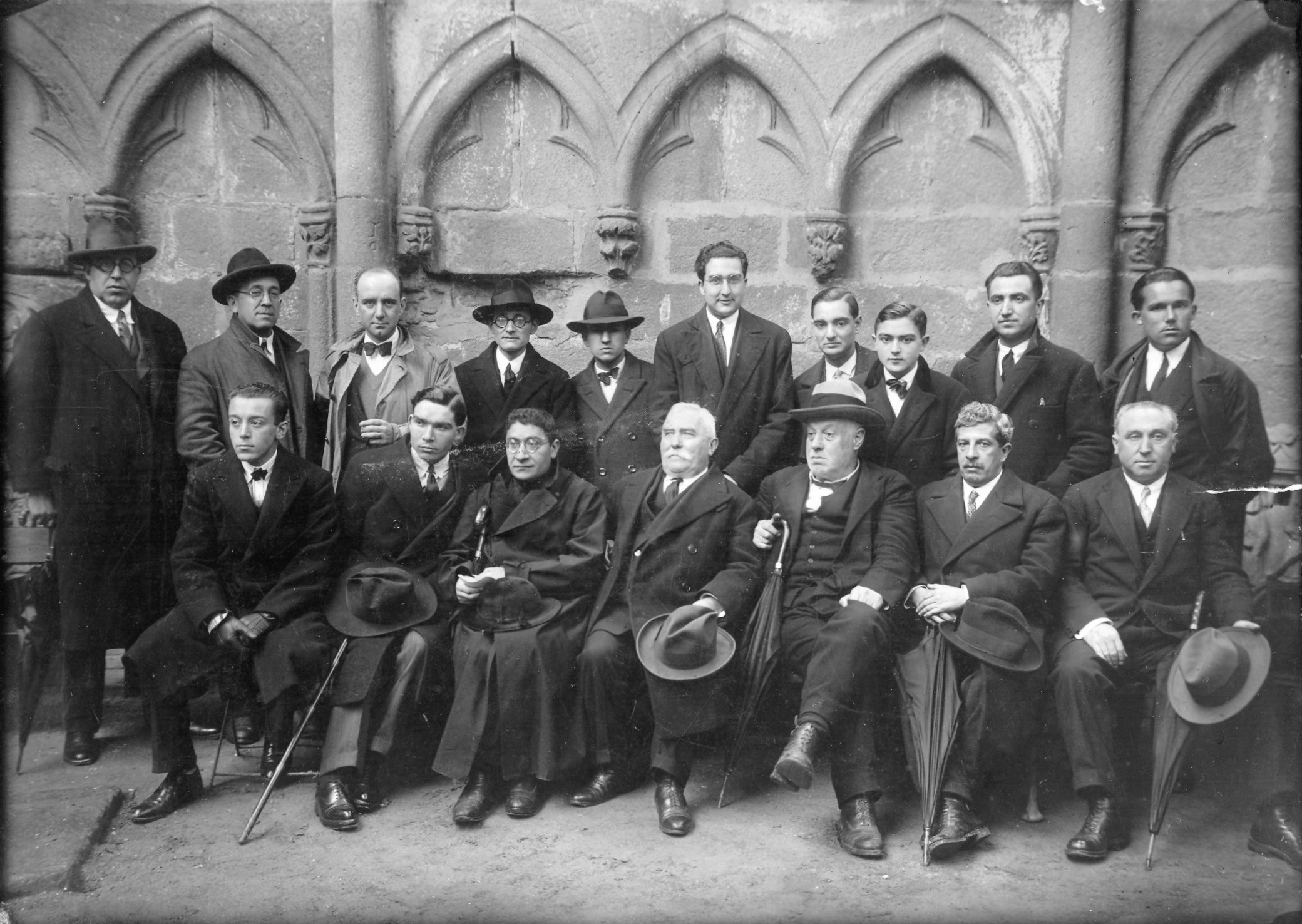

- Trinitarias, 1928 (in Spanish)
- Vieiros, 1931
- La soledad confusa, 1932 (in Spanish)
- O silencio axionllado, 1934
- Anxo da terra, 1950
- Poemas pendurados dun cabelo, 1952
- Calteiro de Fingoi, 1961
- Pretérito Imperfeito, 1980
- Futuro condicional, 1982
- Cantigas de amigo e outros poemas, 1986
- Reticências, 1990

=== Theatre ===
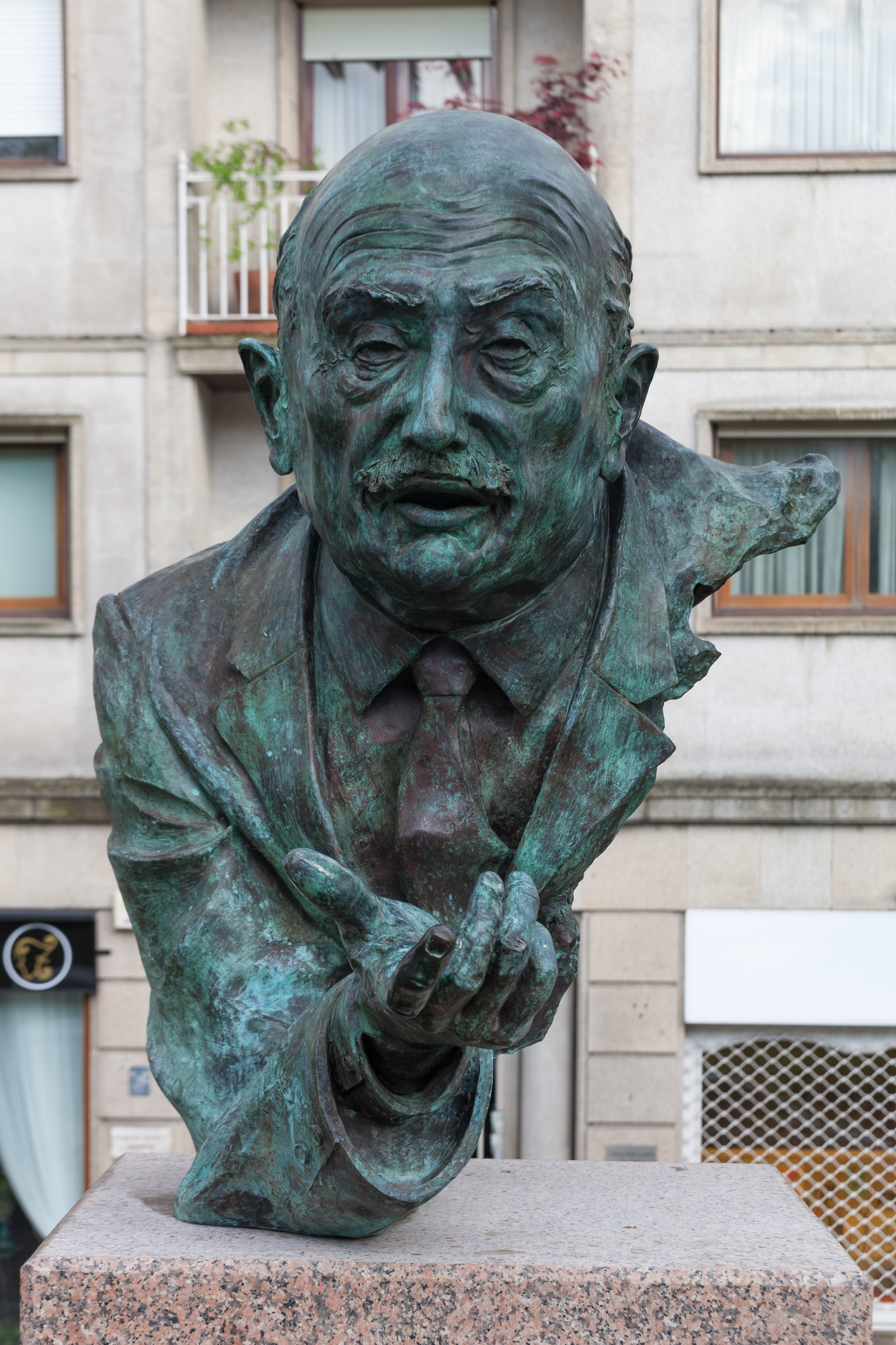
Bust in Compostela.

- O fillo, 1982
- Isabel, 1982
- A sombra de Orfeo, 1971
- Farsa das zocas, 1963
- A arbre, 1965
- O redondel, 1979
- Auto do prisioneiro, 1970
- Os xefes, 1982
- Catro pezas, 1971, Galaxia.
- Teatro completo, 1982, Ediciós do Castro.

=== Narrative ===
- Xente da Barreira, 1951
- Narrativa completa (1984, Ediciós do Castro; Colectánea).
- Scórpio, 1987

=== Essay ===
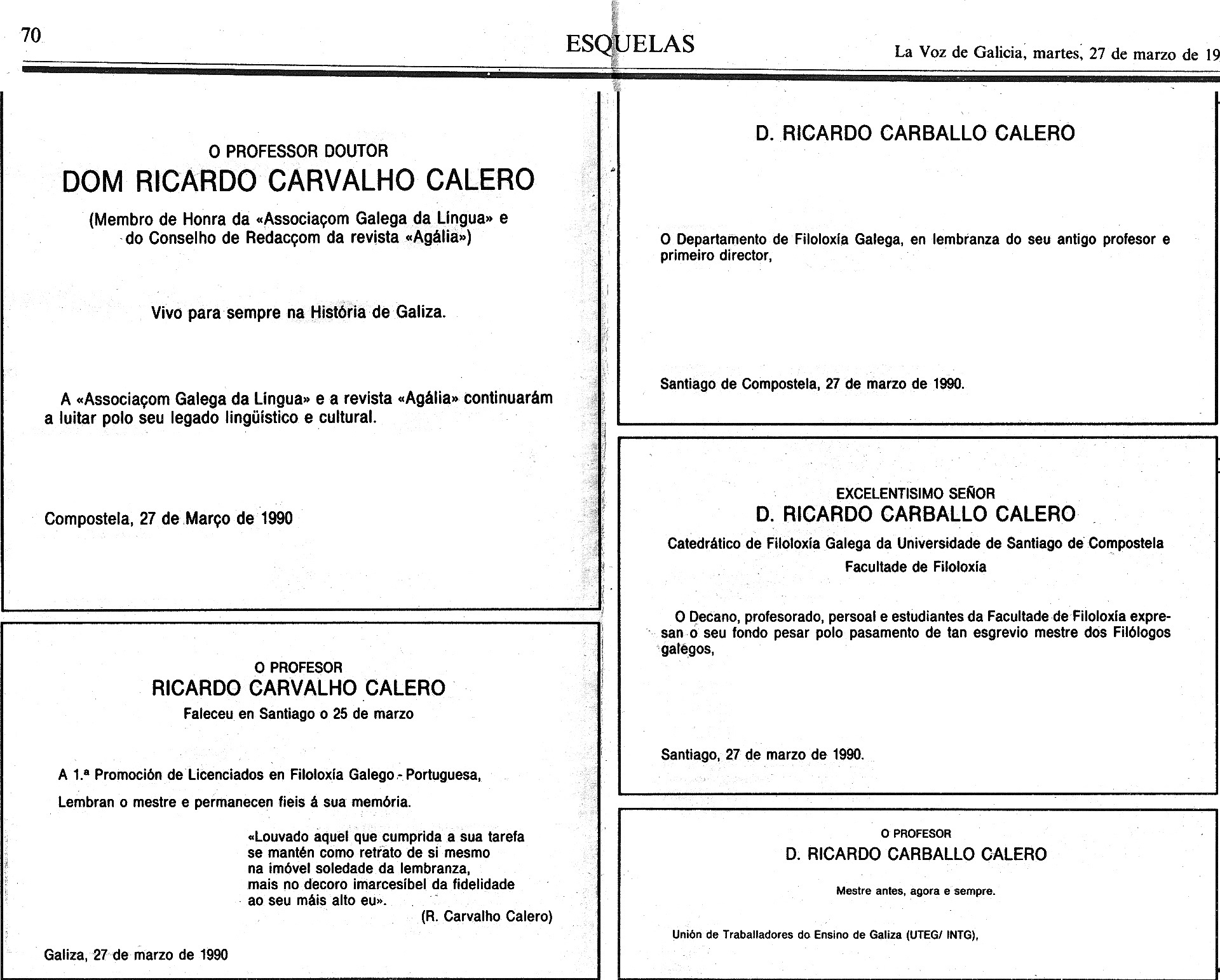

- Sete poemas galegos, 1955
- História da Literatura Galega Contemporánea, 1963 (re-edited in 1975 and 1976)
- Versos iñorados e ou esquecidos de Eduardo Pondal, 1961
- Gramática elemental del gallego común, 1966
- Brevario antológico de la literatura gallega contemporánea, 1966
- Edición de "Cantares gallegos" de Rosalía de Castro, 1969
- Libros e autores galegos: dos trovadores a Valle Inclán, 1970
- Sobre lingua e literatura galega, 1971
- Particularidades morfológicas del lenguaje de Rosalía de Castro, 1972
- Poesías de Rosalía de Castro, with L. Fontoira Surís, 1972
- Estudos rosalianos, 1977
- Problemas da Língua Galega, 1981
- Da Fala e da Escrita, 1983
- Letras Galegas, 1984
- Escritos sobre Castelao, 1989
- Do Galego e da Galiza, 1990 (posthumous)
- Umha voz na Galiza, 1992 (posthumous)

== Some covers ==
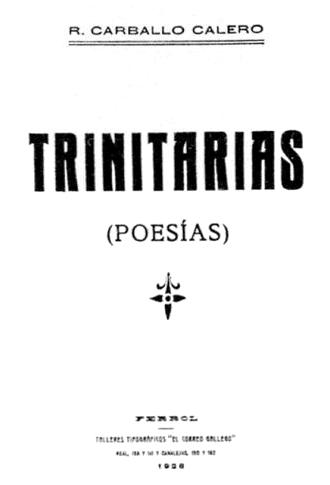
Ricardo Carballo Calero, Trinitarias, Ferrol, 1928.

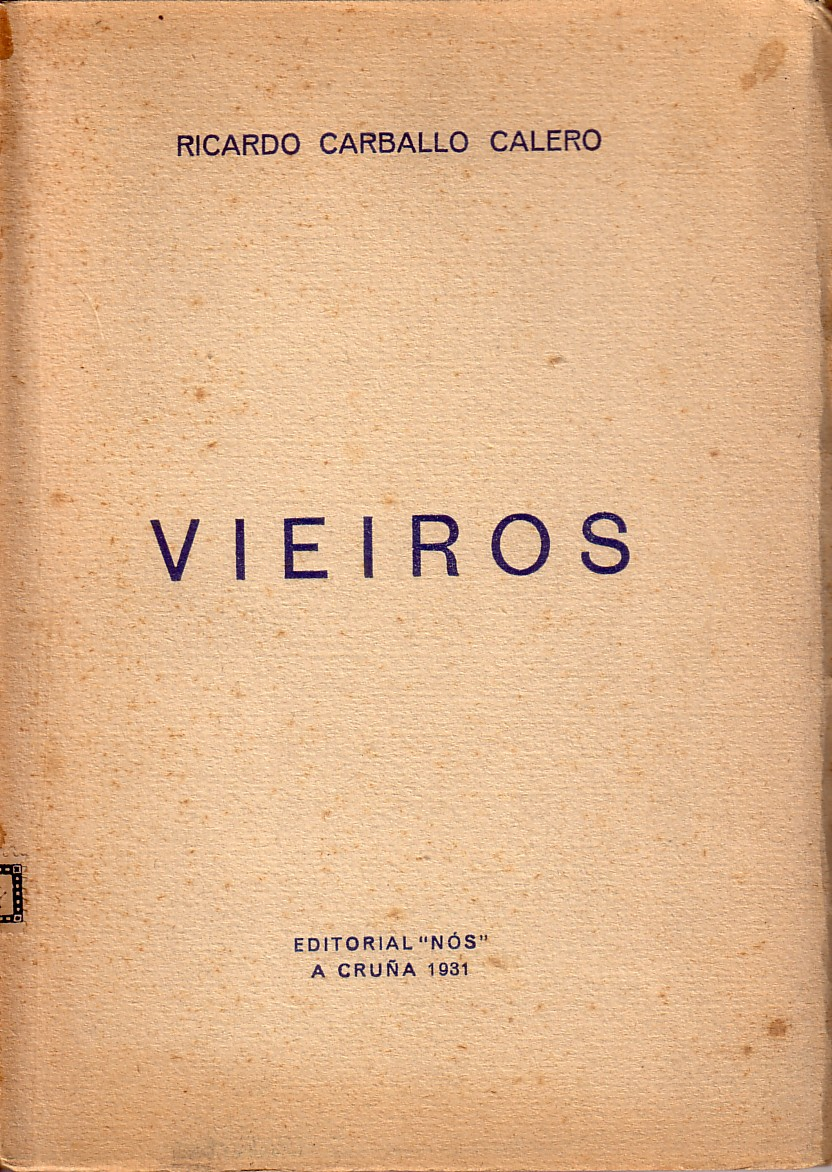
Ricardo Carballo Calero, Vieiros, Nós, 1931.

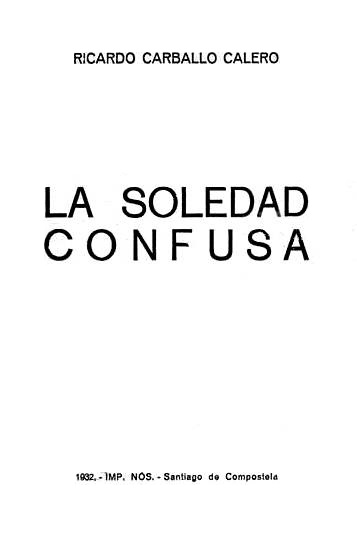
Ricardo Carballo Calero, La soledad confusa, Nós, 1932.

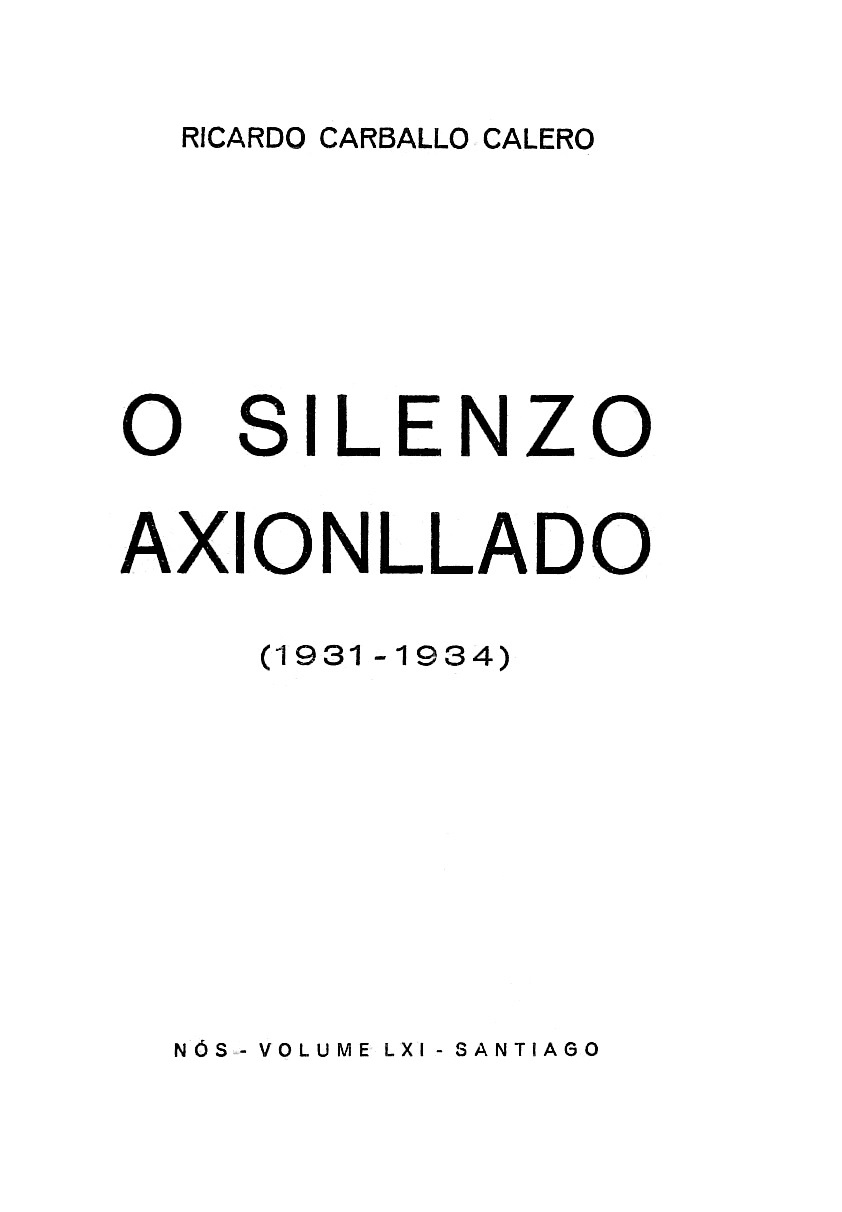
Ricardo Carballo Calero, O silenzo axionllado, Nós, 1934.

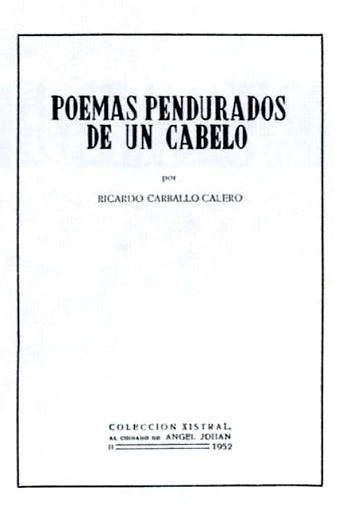
Ricardo Carballo Calero, Poemas pendurados de un cabelo, 1952.

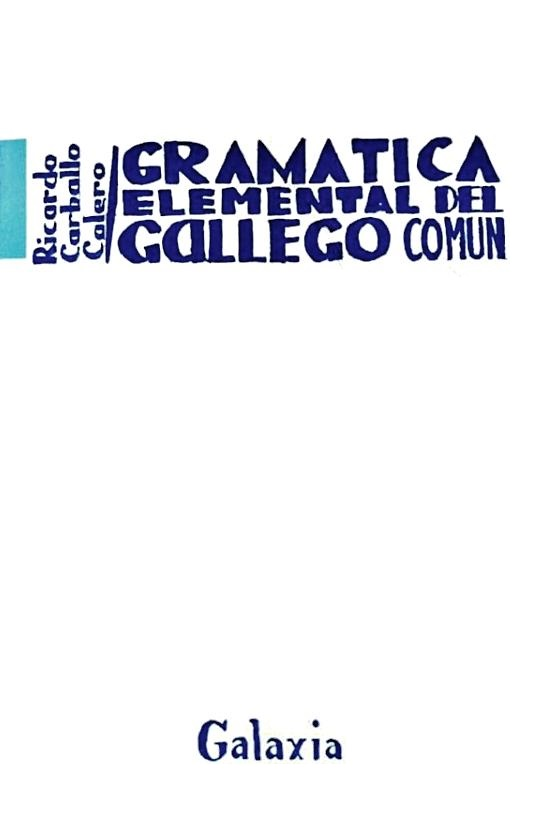
Ricardo Carballo Calero, Gramática elemental del gallego común, 1966.

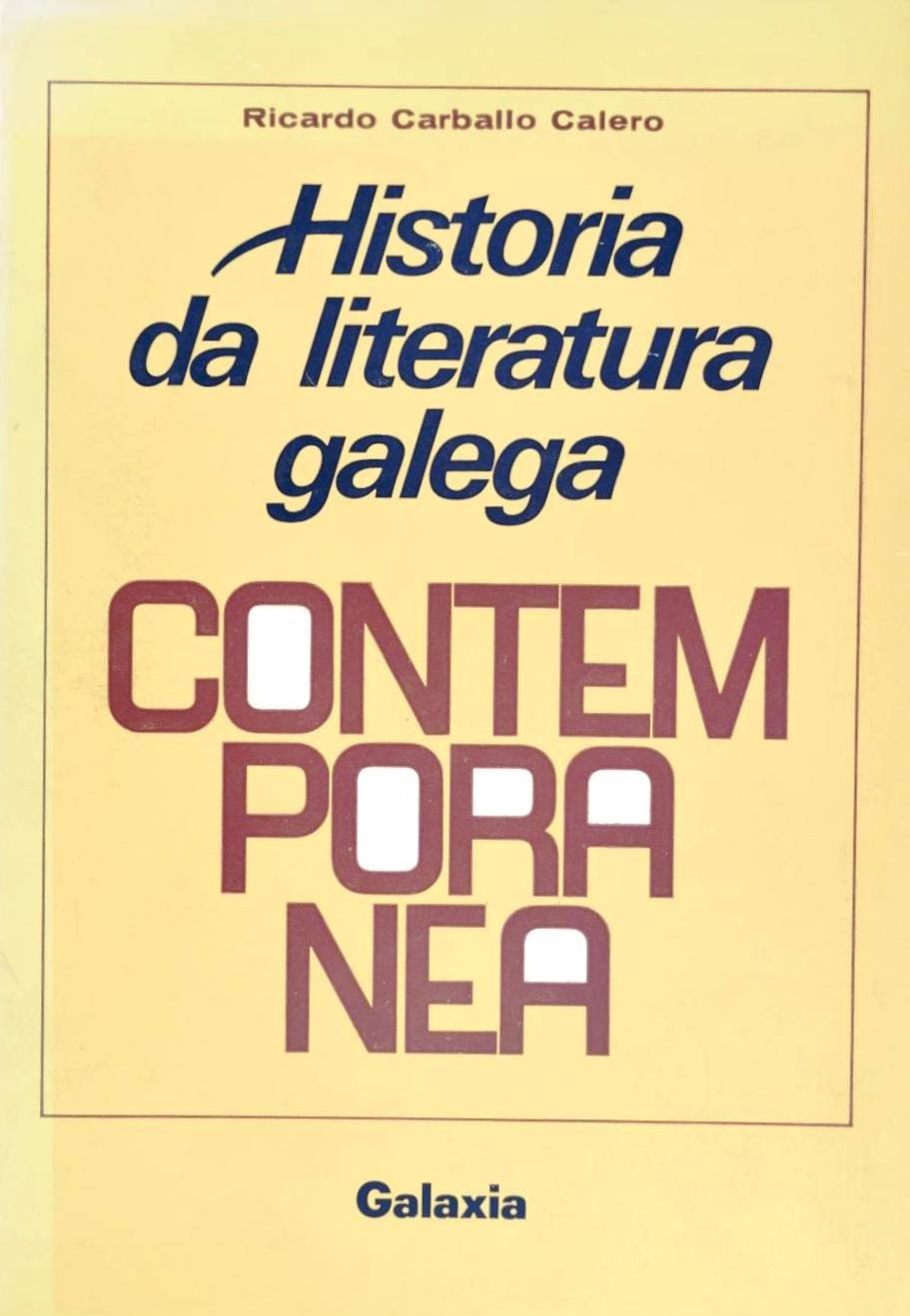
Ricardo Carballo Calero, Historia da literatura galega contemporánea, 2ª ed.

== Bibliography ==
- Blanco García, Carmen (1989). Conversas con Carballo Calero. Vigo: Editorial Galaxia. ISBN 84-7154-654-X.
- Blanco García, Carmen (1991). Carballo Calero: política e cultura. Ediciós do Castro. ISBN 84-7492-519-3.
- Fernán-Vello; Pillado Mayor (1986). Conversas en Compostela con Carballo Calero. Sotelo Blanco. ISBN 84-86021-32-4.
- Fernán-Vello; Pillado Mayor (1992). Carballo Calero. Biblioteca 114. El Correo Gallego.
- Fernández del Riego, F. (1971) [1951]. Historia da literatura galega (2ª ed.). Vigo: Editorial Galaxia. pp. 256, 260, 269–271.
- Fernández del Riego, F. (1992) [1990]. Diccionario de escritores en lingua galega (2ª ed.). Do Castro. p. 73. ISBN 84-7492-465-0.
- Gómez, A.; Queixas, M. (2001). Historia xeral da literatura galega. A Nosa Terra. ISBN 84-95350-79-3.
- Méndez Ferrín, Xosé Luis (1984). De Pondal a Novoneyra. Edicións Xerais de Galicia. pp. 102–104. ISBN 84-7507-139-2.
- Montero Santalha, José-Martinho (1993). Carvalho Calero e a súa obra. Laiovento. ISBN 84-87847-21-8.
- Palharés, P. and Tato Fontainha, L., Ricardo Carvalho Calero. A dignidade persoal, Concello de Ferrol, 1994
- Salinas Portugal, F., Voz e Siléncio (entrevista com R. Carvalho Calero), Ed. do Cúmio, 1991
- Tarrío Varela, Anxo (1994). Literatura galega. Aportacións a unha historia crítica. Universitaria. Xerais. ISBN 84-7507-778-1.
- Vilavedra, Dolores, ed. (1995). Diccionario da literatura galega. Autores I. Vigo: Editorial Galaxia. pp. 108–110. ISBN 84-8288-019-5.
- Ricardo Carvalho Calero, a razom da esperanza, in A Nosa Cultura no. 13, A Nosa Terra, (including the video Ricardo Carvalho Calero; a posibilidade de rectificar a história), 1991
- VVAA (1982). Homenaxe a Carballo Calero. Ferrol. Cadernos do Medulio. ISBN 978-84-300-7158-6.
- VVAA (1999–2002). "Carballo Calero, Ricardo". Enciclopedia Galega Universal 4. Ir Indo. pp. 422–423. ISBN 84-7680-288-9.
- Conhecermos Carvalho Calero. Umha vida polo galego e a Galiza, Grupo de Língua da Fundaçom Artábria, Fundaçom Artábria, 2000
- VVAA (2005). "Carballo Calero, Ricardo". Gran Enciclopedia Galega (DVD). El Progreso. ISBN 84-87804-88-8.
- VVAA (2006). "Carballo Calero, Ricardo". Diciopedia do século 21 1. Do Cumio, Galaxia e do Castro. p. 432. ISBN 978-84-8288-942-9.
