= Galician Antifascist Students Assembly =

Galician Antifascist Students Assembly Assembleia de Estudantes Galeg@s Antifascistas
- Founded: 1998
- Headquarters: Vigo, Galicia
- Ideology: Galician independence Libertarian socialism Feminism; Anti-fascism

Galician Antifascist Students Assembly (AEGA, Assembleia de Estudantes Galeg@s Antifascistas in Galician language) was a Galician student union with its main base in the University of Vigo. AEGA had an antifascist, anticapitalist and Galician independentist ideology. The organization was one of the 4 student groups that created AGIR in 2000, dissolving itself in the process. A sector of AEGA (mainly the more anarchist sector) that didn't agree with the self-dissolution formed Assembleia Azrael, that disappeared in 2001. One of the main goals of the organization was to fight fascism in the University of Vigo, specially the Syndicalist Students Front, a student group linked with the Falange.
