= Causa Galiza =

- Founded: 2012
- Merger of: Organizaçom para a Liberaçom Nacional and independents
- Headquarters: Santiago de Compostela
- Union affiliation: Confederación Intersindical Galega
- Ideology: Galician independence Socialism
- Political position: Left-wing

Website
- causagaliza.org

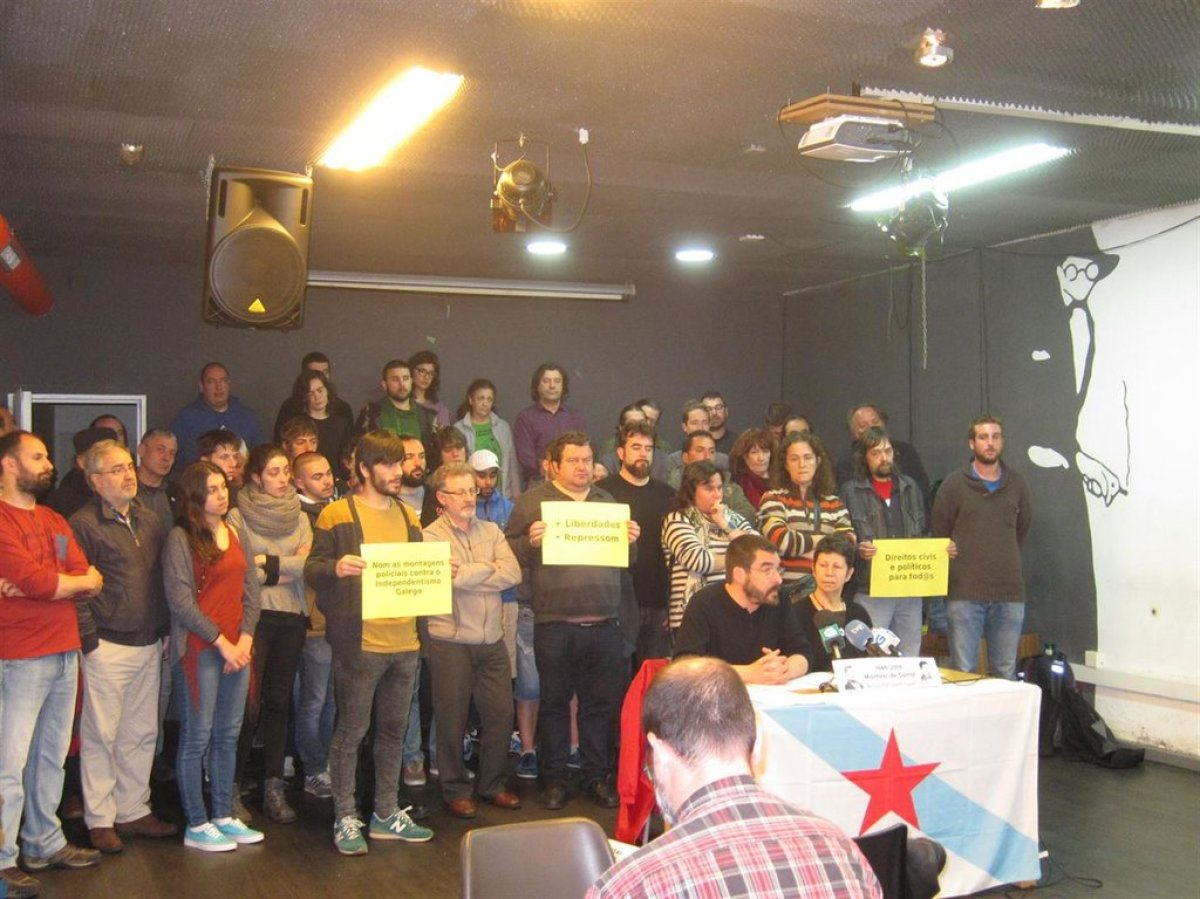
Conference of the organization after the 2016 arrests.

Causa Galiza (Cause Galiza or Galician Cause) is a Galician left-wing pro-independence political party. It was formed in 2012 and became a political party in March 2014. In the 2014 European elections, it advised abstaining or voting for the Galician Nationalist Bloc.

== Ideology ==
The party considers independence its main objective. It also supports socialism, feminism and the autonomy of the social movements.

== 2015 arrests and temporary ban ==
On 31 October 2015, nine members of Causa Galiza were arrested under suspicion of membership in Resistência Galega and of glorifying terrorism. The group's activities were prohibited by the Audiencia Nacional until December 2016.
