= Primeira Linha =

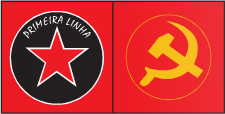
- General secretary: Carlos Morais
- Founded: 1998
- Dissolved: 2015
- Headquarters: Santiago de Compostela
- Newspaper: Abrente
- Youth wing: BRIGA
- Ideology: Galician nationalism Marxism-leninism; Feminism; Reintegracionism; Galician independence
- Political position: Far-left
- National affiliation: Agora Galiza (2015-...); Nós-Unidade Popular (2001-2015)

Website
- primeiralinha.org

Primeira Linha (First Line in Galician language) was a communist organization which is part of the Galician Movement of National Liberation, which seeks, "to overcome the concrete national and social oppression imposed by capitalism on Galicia, in order to contribute to the worldwide construction of a communist society."

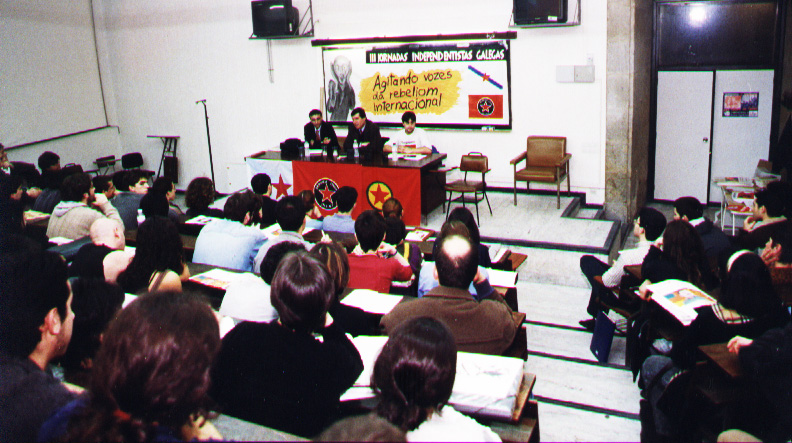
Second Galician Independentist Conference. Compostela, March, 1999

== History ==
=== Foundation and first stage inside the Galician Nationalist Bloc ===
Primeira Linha was formed in Galicia, in 1996, with the objective of organizing the independentist and communist groups which were within the Galician Nationalist Bloc (BNG). Primeira Linha remained a part of the BNG, but was in constant conflict with the current controlling power, the Galician People's Union.

During this time, Primeira Linha was working with other militant organizations, such as ANA-ANOC and CAF, among others. In 1998, Primeira Linha held its first congress. Given the contradictions and conflicts resulting from the political work within the Galician Nationalist Bloc, Primeira Linha members resolved to leave the Nationalist Bloc in 1999, after the majority decision was made at their second congress.

In its quarterly publication, Abrente, Primeira Linha explained that, "An unbreathable climate of harassment was obstructing our political work, it was forcing us to use vast energies and resources in mere defense."

=== Independentist Reorganization outside the Galician Nationalist Bloc ===
The second congress also set forth a policy of unity and collaboration with other independentist organizations outside the Galician Nationalist Block. They allied with the AMI and the FPG, with the goal of forming an organic whole.

They called this conglomeration the National Unit Commission of the Independentist Left, a dynamic unit which broke apart in 2000 because of differing expectations from each organization. That same year, Primeira Linha participated in the creation of "Popular Regional Meetings", which formed the precedent for the Processo Espiral, which led to the creation, in 2001, of NÓS-Unidade Popular.

Primeira Linha has been doing political work in the heart of Nós-Unidade Popular since 2001, and has also participated in youth organizations, independent student organizations, and feminist, cultural and trade unions.

=== Model of Socialism ===
In 2002, Primeira Linha held its third congress, in which the members defined the organization's theoretical model of socialism, and worked out, "the essential composition and working direction of the movement for Galicia's national liberation", rejecting the traditional inter-class formula used by earlier nationalist organizations. Primeira Linha also affirmed that, "the morphology of classes in Galicia is more similar to that of advanced capitalist societies than of the so-called Third World.

=== Publications and Supporting Activities ===
Giving priority to their work within larger entities and other sectors of the Galician national left, Primeira Linha maintains several publications supporting its own initiatives. Since 1996, Primeira Linha has published its quarterly newspaper, Abrente, which already exceedes fifty editions. In its editorial stamp, Abrente Editora, numerous titles were published, as well some Marxist classics previously unpublished in Galicia, and other works of Galician authors.

Primeira Linha has also been organizing the annual Galician Independentist Conference for the last ten years.

== See also ==
- Nationalities in Spain
- List of Communist Parties
- Nós-Unidade Popular (Nós-UP) - Us-People United (Galician socialist and independentist party)
