= Fernando Venâncio =

Portuguese writer (1944–2025)

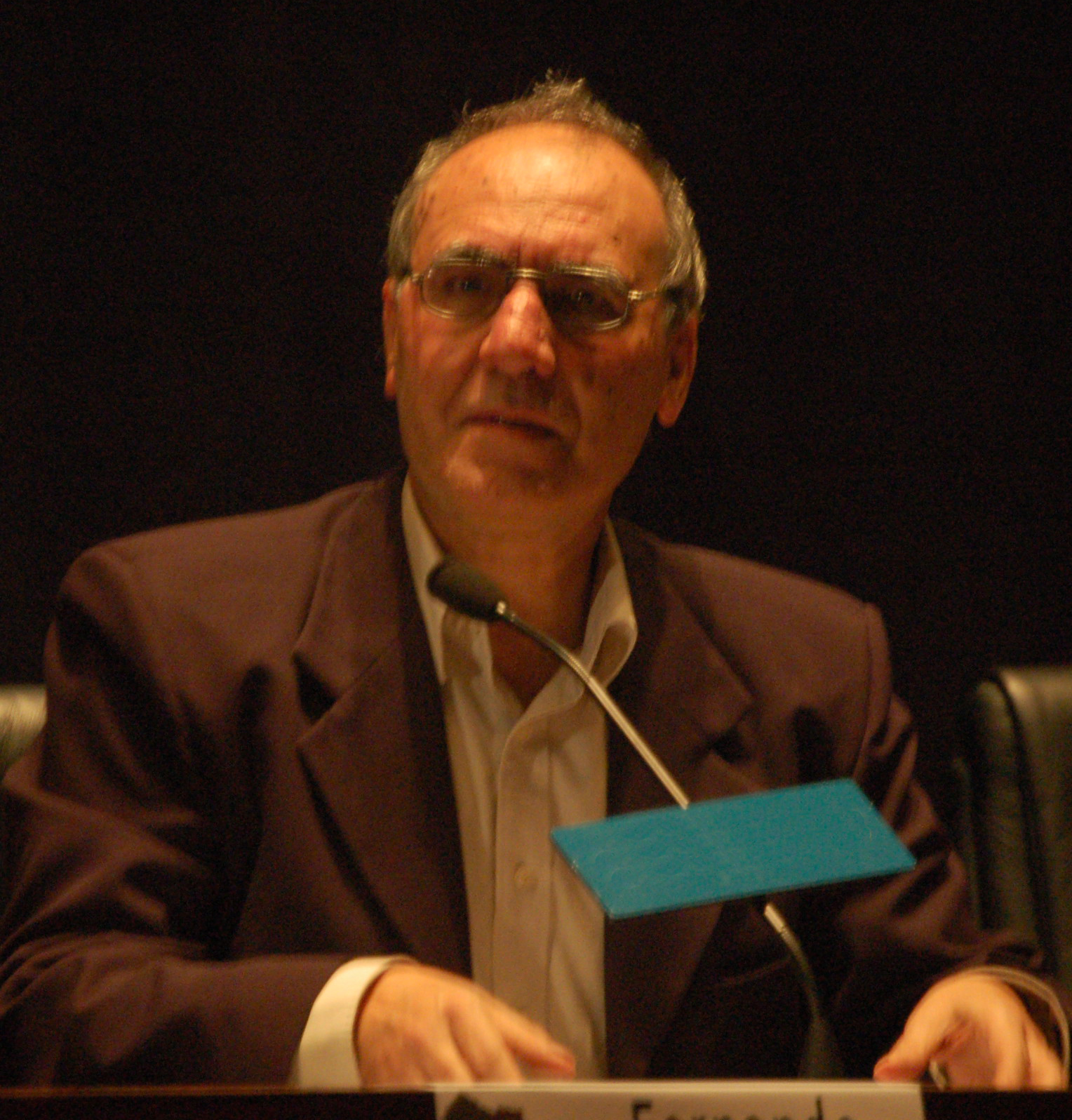

Fernando Venâncio (13 November 1944 – 30 May 2025) was a Portuguese-born writer, intellectual, literary critic, linguist and academic. He held Dutch nationality.

== Life and career ==
Fernando Venâncio was born in Mértola on 13 November 1944. He and spent his childhood in Lisbon and completed his secondary school in the northern Portuguese city of Braga. He studied Philosophy in Vila Nova de Ourém and Theology in Lisbon. In 1970 he moved to the Netherlands, where he eventually completed his studies in linguistics at the University of Amsterdam in 1976. Two years later, he began lecturing at the department of Portuguese studies in the University of Nijmegen. From 1984 to 1988 he taught at the University of Utrecht, eventually returning to the University of Amsterdam to teach Portuguese language and culture. In 1995 Venâncio completed his doctoral degree with a thesis on Portuguese language.

He was an accomplished author and a contributor to prestigious journals such as Jornal Literário, Ler and Colóquio/Letras, where he worked as a literary critic. He also published in the Portuguese newspaper Expresso and in the magazine Visão. Until March 2008, he was a regular contributor in the collective blog Aspirina B.

Venâncio, although controversial in some issues, expressed pro-reintegrationism views, referring to the relationship between the Galician and Portuguese languages.

Venâncio died in his hometown of Mértola on 30 May 2025, at the age of 80.

== Selected works ==
- Uma migalha na Saia do Universo, 1997 (poetry collection, translated from Dutch)
- Estilo e Preconceito. A Língua Literária em Portugal na Época de Castilho, 1998 (doctoral thesis, published by Edições Cosmos)
- Um Almoço de Negócios em Sintra, 1999 (translation of the work by Gerrit Komrij)
- Os Esquemas de Fradique, 1999
- Jose Saramago: A Luz e o Sombreado, 2000
- El-Rei no Porto, 2001
- Maquinações e Bons Sentimentos, 2002
- Ensaios Literários, 2002
- Quem Inventou Marrocos: Diários de Viagem, 2004
- Último Minuete em Lisboa, 2008.
