= Jon Amil =

Physician and Galician language activist

- Jon Amil in Lisbon
- Born: 17 May 1988 (age 38); Vigo, Galicia
- Education: University of Santiago de Compostela
- Occupations: Physician and language activist
- Known for: President of the Galician Language Association
- Website: amil.gal

Jon Amil (Galician pronunciation: [aˈmil] ah-MEEL; born 17 May 1988) is a Galician physician and language activist. He is associated with the reintegrationist movement, and since July 2023 he has served as president of the Galician Language Association (AGAL).

== Career ==
Born to a Basque mother and a Galician father, he was born and spent his childhood in Vigo. He graduated in medicine from the University of Santiago de Compostela. In 2007, together with other students, he founded the Asemblea Libre de Estudantes de Medicina (Free Assembly of Medical Students, ALEM), of which he was the first chairman. In 2013 he started publishing a blog called As MIR e unha noites (a pun on One Thousand and One Nights, giving the proximity between the Galician word for thousand, mil, and the name of the medical formation program, MIR), in which he recounted his misadventures studying for the MIR (Internal Resident Physician) selection exam and health awareness videos, gaining popularity on Galician social media. After finishing university, he emigrated to the Basque Country, where he worked at a medical examination centre. From 2016 to 2023 he was a member of the AGAL's Board of Directors and managed the Twitter account @emgalego, its linguistic advice service. Because of his medical studies and his connection with the Galician language, he has often been compared to Castelao.

On 9 July 2023, he became president of the AGAL, succeeding the philologist Eduardo Maragoto.

== Language activism ==
Interview with Jon Amil on the TV programme Rostros do País, from Nós Televisión and Movistar Plus+.

Although he had participated in various campaigns and initiatives for the language before then, it was after joining the AGAL that he began to gain prominence as one of the visible faces of reintegrationism. In December 2015 he created the linguistic advice service @emgalego, which started on Twitter, but eventually expanded to other social media platforms, even making occasional collaborations with other initiatives such as the programme Dígocho eu from Televisión de Galicia. He ran the project solo until 2023, when he was replaced by Juan Antelo.

In July 2023 he was elected president of the AGAL, with the pillars of his project being young people and children, feminism and the LGBTQ people. In 2024 he secured the admission of the AGAL into the Community of Portuguese Language Countries (CPLP) with Consultative Observer status. In 2026, he led the campaign Falo galego, fala-me português! (I speak Galician, speak Portuguese to me!).

Currently, Jon Amil is also a member of several working committees of the CPLP and a board member of the Observatório da Lusofonia Valentim Paz-Andrade (Valentim Paz-Andrade Lusophony Observatory), a body of the Xunta de Galicia for relations with Portuguese-speaking countries.

== Video game dissemination ==
Over the years, Jon Amil has participated in various projects and forums dedicated to the promotion of video games and, in particular, Galician-language video games.

=== Memoria Pixelada ===
On 4 August 2010, he joined the team of Memoria Pixelada (Pixelated Memory), the first website about video games published entirely in Galician, created by Juan Salgado a year earlier. During the project's lifetime, he published 227 articles and was in charge of the annual live coverage in Galician of major events such as E3 and the various Nintendo Direct presentations.

=== Recuncho Gamer ===
Jon Amil on the Recuncho Gamer Podcast

He is currently part of the team at Recuncho Gamer, an audiovisual project created in 2020 by Iago Gordillo with the aim of promoting video game culture in Galician. Within the project, he is an active contributor to the Recuncho Gamer Podcast, and co-creator of the podcasts Outeiro Verde and Ditto Isto. In addition, he was one of the people responsible for creating Xogalego, an online catalogue of video games that have been localized into Galician.

He is also a screenwriter and presenter on the television programme Xogando en galego (Playing in Galician), produced by Recuncho Gamer for Televisión de Galicia.

== Other online projects ==
His activity on the Galician Internet began in 2007 with the creation of a fan website for the Xabarín Club called Xeración Xabarín (Xabarín Generation), which remained active until March 2013, when it had to be shut down following an order from the CRTVG. In 2013 he started his blog As MIR e unha noites, which was his largest project up to that point.

In 2020 he won the Prémios do Galituiter (Galitwitter Awards), a self-organized competition by the Galician community on Twitter, which granted him the unofficial title of "president of Galitwitter" for the year 2021.

He is also co-creator of another podcast dedicated to the series Doctor Who called Gallifrey Ceive (Free Gallifrey), which was a finalist for the Pioneer Award at the Youtubeiras+ contest.

== Works ==
=== Collective books ===
- Remédios para o Galego (Remedies for the Galician language). Santiago de Compostela: Através Editora. 2017. p. 264. ISBN 978-84-16545-13-1.

=== Lectures ===
- PROPOR24 - E se... já soubesses português sem te decatar? (What if... you already knew Portuguese without realising?). CiTIUS. 2024.
- O futuro da língua está na lusofonia (The future of our language lies in Lusophony). RECLAM. 2025.

=== Articles ===
- A nossa língua no mundo (Our language in the world). Report Nós no Mundo, p. 33. IGADI. 2026.

== See also ==
- Galician Language Association
- Reintegrationism
