= Manuel Rodrigues Lapa =

Portuguese philologist (1897–1989)

Manuel Rodrigues Lapa (22 April 1897 – 28 March 1989) was a Portuguese philologist and professor who specialized in the Galician language and medieval Portuguese literature. Among his most well-known works are the 1930 doctoral thesis Das origens da poesia lírica em Portugal na Idade Média and the 1934 book Lições de Literatura Portuguesa: Época Medieval.

== Biography ==
Born in Anadia into a modest family, he completed his secondary education in Lisbon, attending Colégio de Santa Isabel and Liceu Pedro Nunes, where he directed a student newspaper. In 1919, he graduated in Romance Philology from the Faculty of Letters of Lisbon. The following year, he began working at the National Library of Portugal. He taught at secondary schools, including the Liceu Camões, before becoming an assistant professor at his alma mater in 1930.

After completing his doctorate, he helped establish the Centro de Estudos Filológicos at the University of Lisbon. In 1932, he traveled through Galicia, where he met Alfonso Daniel Rodríguez Castelao. His position at the university was revoked with the installment of the Estado Novo in 1935, which led him to support himself working as a journalist and giving private courses. A fervent opponent of Salazar's regime, he was arrested in 1949 after supporting the presidential candidacy of Norton de Matos. He later settled in Belo Horizonte, Brazil, where he was appointed professor of Portuguese literature at the Faculty of Letters of the Federal University of Minas Gerais.

During this period, he conducted research on the authorship of the Cartas Chilenas, which he attributed to Tomás Antônio Gonzaga, and studied the works of 18th century Brazilian poets such as Alvarenga Peixoto and Cláudio Manuel da Costa. A reintegrationist, he proposed that the Portuguese orthography should be adopted for Galician, and that the language should be integrated into the Lusophone cultural world, arguing that the languages are ''radically the same''. He edited the critical edition of the Cantigas d’escarnho e maldizer dos cancioneiros medievais galego-portugueses as well as the Cantigas de Santa Maria by Afonso X of Castille, and wrote essays on Luís de Camões and Diogo do Couto.

After the Carnation Revolution, he returned to Portugal, where he directed the anti-Salazarist cultural journal Seara Nova. In 1988, he was awarded a honoris causa degree from the University of Aveiro, and two years later he posthumously received the Military Order of Saint James of the Sword.

== Works ==
- Origens da Poesia Lírica em Portugal na Idade Média (1930)
- Lições de literatura portuguesa: época medieval (1934)
- Crestomatia arcaica (1940)
- Estilística da língua portuguesa (1945)
- As «Cartas Chilenas» Um Problema Histórico e Filológico (1958)
- Miscelânea de língua e literatura portuguesa medieval (1965)
- As minhas razões: Memórias de um idealista que quis endireitar o mundo... (1983)
