= José Posada =

Spanish politician (1940–2013)

José Domingo Posada González (May 9, 1940 – January 14, 2013), of Galicia, Spain, was a member of the European Parliament from 1994 to 1999 and is the president of Galician Coalition (a regionalist political party now integrated in Commitment to Galicia).

Posada came to the spotlight in 1994 as he was the first member of the Parliament to use Galician in his spoken and written communications. This was accepted since Galician was considered to be like Portuguese, which is an official language of the European Union. Since then Posada is considered a reintegrationist.

Today, his processing plant is one of the biggest producers and exporters of Spanish marron glacé. It was established in 1955.

He died on January 14, 2013.
