= Galician independence movement =

Independence movement in Galicia

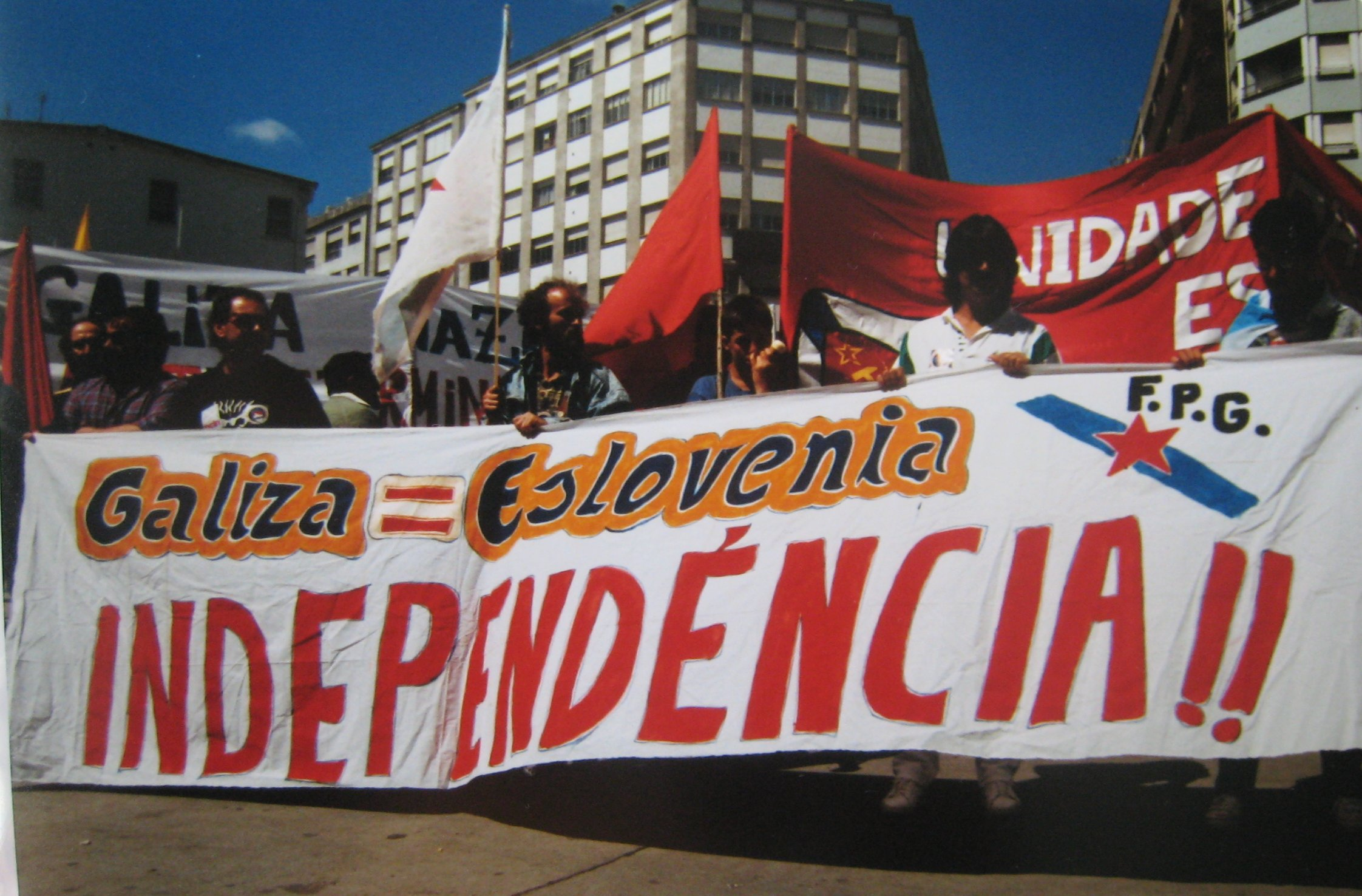
Supporters of Galician independence in 1991 comparing Galicia's situation with Slovenia's, which had recently gained independence

The Galician independence movement (Galician: movemento de independenza galego) or the Galician separatist movement (Galician: movemento separatista galego) is a political movement and social movement derived from Galician nationalism that supports the independence of Galicia and the other Galician-speaking territories outside the Autonomous Community of Galicia, including As Portelas, O Bierzo, and the Eo-Navian lands (which are collectively known as Galicia irredenta) from Spain.

Popular support for separatism in Galicia can be traced to the 1920s and 1930s, nearly a century after the dissolution of the Kingdom of Galicia in 1833, when Spain underwent a strong process of centralization in which Galicia lost its political, economic, military and diplomatic powers and Spain pursued bureaucratic centralization alongside juridical, linguistic and cultural homogenization. After the death of Francisco Franco in 1975, mainstream Galician political parties concentrated on recovering autonomy rather than pursuing outright independence. No parties explicitly advocating independence have seats in the Parliament of Galicia, although pro-independence tendencies exist within the Galician Nationalist Bloc (BNG), and the BNG's youth wing, Galiza Nova, is openly independentist. Among the most prominent explicitly independentist organizations outside the BNG are Causa Galiza and the Frente Popular Galega (FPG), following the dissolution of Nós-Unidade Popular in 2015.

== History ==
=== Early beginnings ===
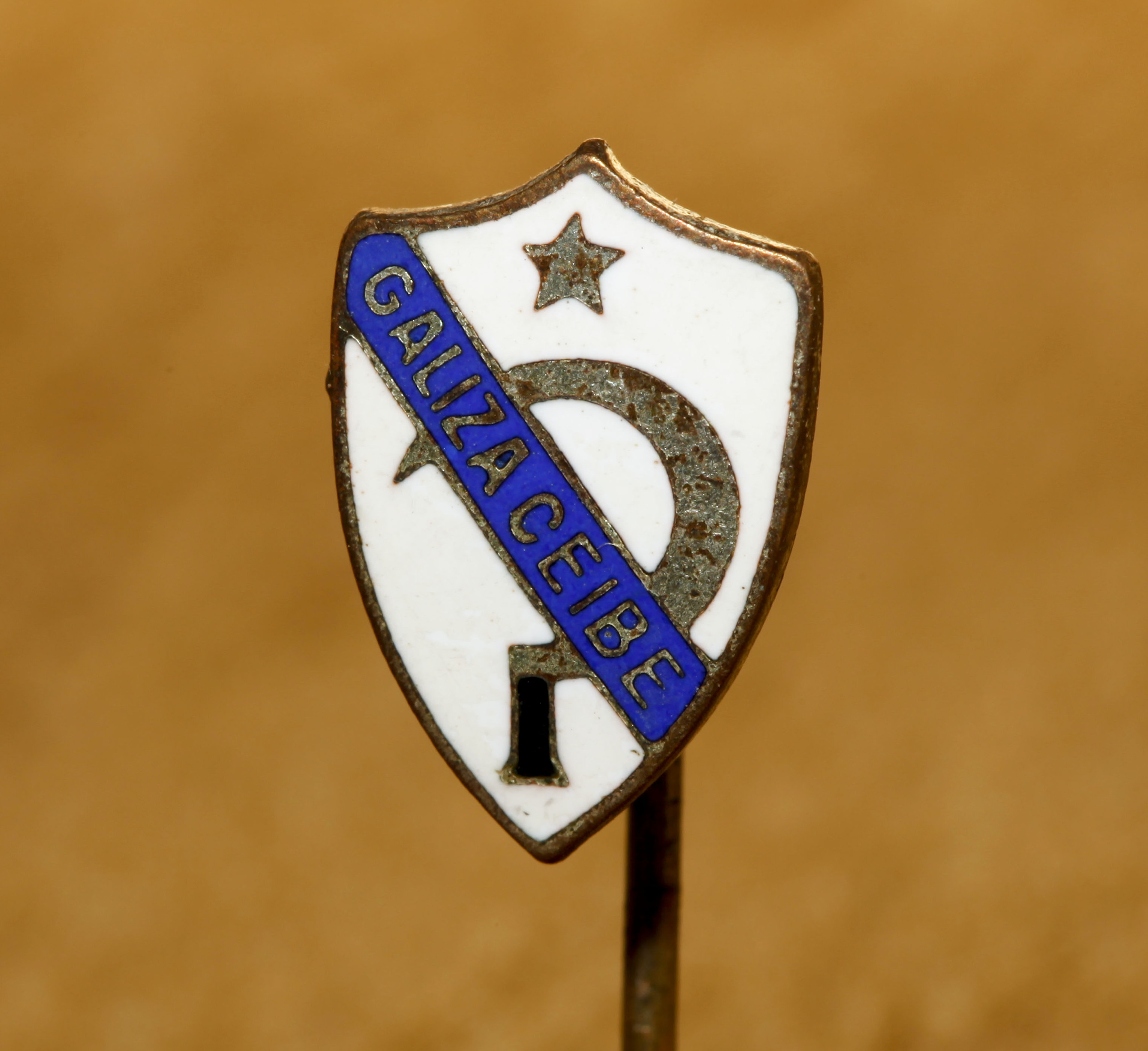
Badge of the Sociedade Nazonalista Pondal, 1929

In 1843, ten years after the abolition of the Kingdom of Galicia as part of the centralization of the Spanish state, an assembly was held in Lugo to discuss the reorganization of Galicia in opposition to the regency of Baldomero Espartero. At that assembly, Antolín Faraldo proposed debating Galician independence. His proposal was rejected by a single vote.

The first organized political expression of Galician independentism was the Comité Revoluzonareo Arredista Galego, founded by Fuco Gómez in Cuba in 1921, though it had little significance during the Second Spanish Republic. In Argentina, there was also an independentist association called the Sociedade Nazonalista Pondal, active mainly during the 1930s. Within Galicia itself, some independentist activity also existed during the 1930s, notably the Vangarda Nazonalista Galega.

=== Republic of Galicia ===
On 27 June 1931, a day before elections to the Constituent Assembly of the Second Spanish Republic, Antón Alonso Ríos proclaimed the Republic of Galicia in Santiago de Compostela, where he was acclaimed as president of the provisional revolutionary government. The proclamation was triggered by widespread discontent over caciquismo and the suspension of construction of the railway line leaving some 12,000 workers unemployed, and it lasted only a few hours before the central government of the Second Republic resolved the railway dispute, preventing the insurrection from spreading. The civil governor of the Province of Ourense and Interior Minister Miguel Maura officially denied to the press that the proclamation had taken place.

=== Franco and the 1970s ===
The Estreleira has been used since the 1970s as the flag of the Galician separatist and nationalist movements

With the beginning and spread of several mass movements of protest in 1968, including various regions and cities of Spain united against Francisco Franco's regime, the Francoist dictatorship repressed protests and strikes across the country using police brutality and state violence. In the early 1970s, a sector of the Galician People's Union (UPG) close to Moncho Reboiras attempted to organize armed struggle against the Francoist dictatorship following the model of ETA, but this effort ended with the killing of Reboiras by Francoist police on 12 August 1975 in Ferrol. In 1978, a sector of the UPG split off, forming first the Galician People's Union-Proletarian Line and later the Galician Party of the Proletariat, which had a secessionist character and established an assembly front, Galiza Ceibe-OLN, into which it dissolved in 1981. This grouping also promoted the creation of the Loita Armada Revolucionaria (LAR), which carried out actions primarily against the construction of the AP-9 motorway, leading to the arrest of several leaders including Xosé Luís Méndez Ferrín.

=== Galician independentism at present ===
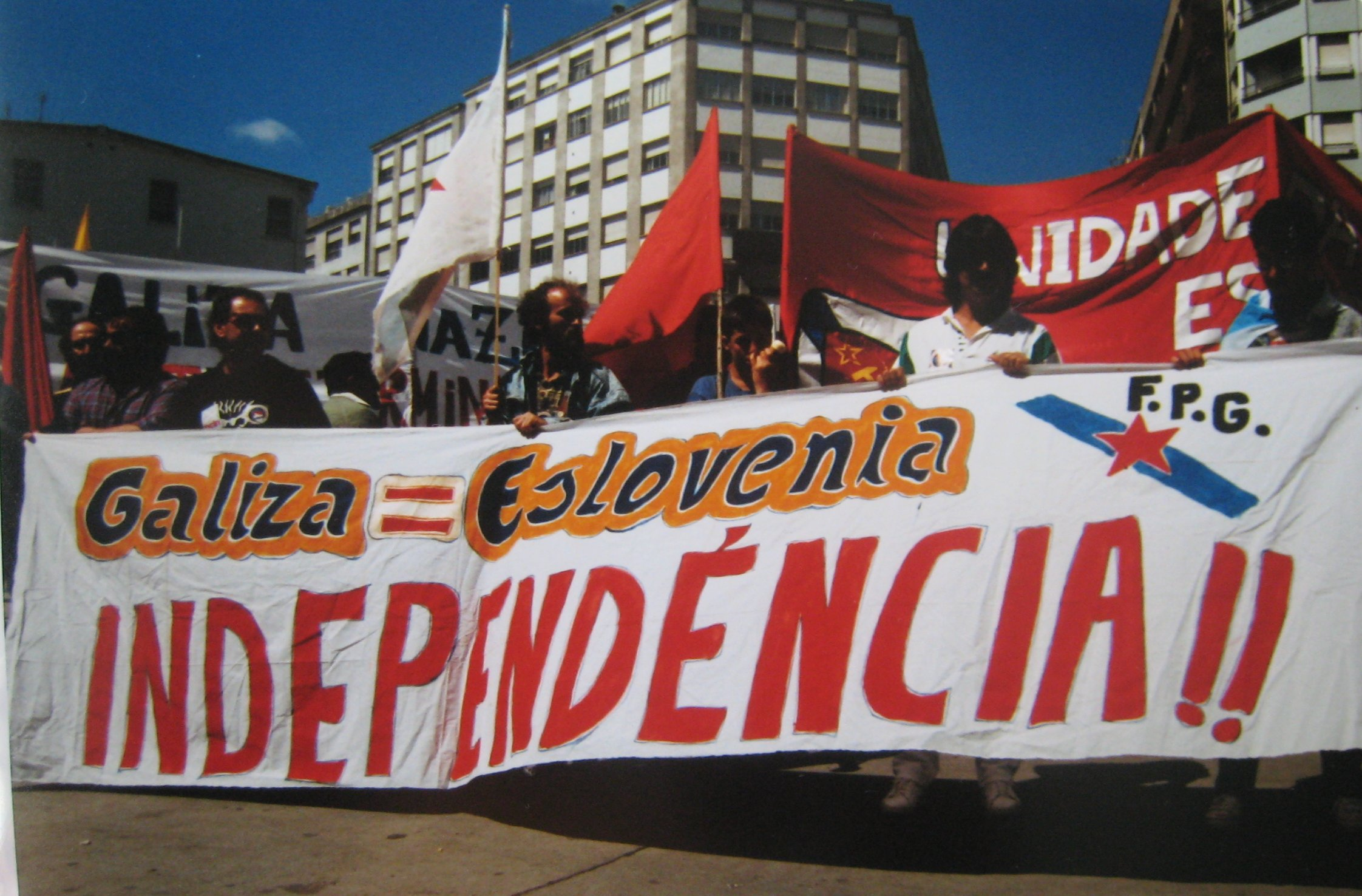
FPG demonstration on 25 July, the Day of the Galician Homeland, 1991

In 1986 the Communist Party of National Liberation, a secessionist splinter of the UPG, was expelled from the Galician Nationalist Bloc (BNG) for having supported the candidacy of Herri Batasuna during the elections to the European Parliament. Alongside Galiza Ceibe-OLN (the new name of the organization) and several other independentist groups, they formed the Frente Popular Galega the following year, which has since been the main Galician secessionist organization.

In that context the Exército Guerrilheiro do Povo Galego Ceive (EGPGC) appeared, an armed organization formed in 1986 mainly by members of Galiza Ceibe-OLN. It carried out 90 actions in six years, the last on 13 September 1991. As a consequence of its actions, two EGPGC members and a young woman died in the bombing of the Clangor disco in Santiago de Compostela, and the group killed Civil Guard officer Benedicto García Ruzo and seriously wounded another when attempting to steal their weapons in Irixoa. Several dozen suspected members were subsequently arrested.

In 1989, the sector close to Galiza Ceibe-OLN left the Frente Popular Galega over disagreements about strategy and the treatment of EGPGC prisoners, and founded the Assembleia do Povo Unido (APU). The APU dissolved in 1995, and its legacy passed to the youth organization Assembleia da Mocidade Independentista (AMI), founded in 1993. In 2001, Nós-Unidade Popular (Nós-UP) was formed, with AMI as its youth wing. Nós-UP dissolved in June 2015.

Ten members of the AMI and other groups were detained in 2005, two of them strongly suspected of having placed a bomb in an ATM in Santiago de Compostela. That same year the existence of a group named Resistência Galega was made public; the group has since claimed responsibility for several small bomb attacks.

In spring 2007 a civic platform called Causa Galiza was founded to advocate for the right of self-determination. Following the dissolution of Nós-UP in 2015 and of AMI in September 2014, Causa Galiza became the main independentist party outside the BNG.

In 2014 the BNG's youth wing, Galiza Nova, held its 13th National Assembly and for the first time formally adopted the position of supporting Galician national independence and the formation of an independent Galician republic as the path to sovereignty for the Galician people.

In 2017 the 16th National Assembly of the BNG formally acknowledged the existence of two tendencies within the organization regarding self-determination: confederation on equal terms with other peoples of the state, and outright independence. That same year the UPG, the largest party within the BNG, began publicly positioning itself in favor of independence as the means to achieve Galician sovereignty.

In the 2024 Galician regional election, the BNG achieved a historic result of 25 seats in the 75-seat Parliament of Galicia with 31.34% of the vote, becoming the main opposition to the governing PPdeG.

== Pro-independence public figures ==
- Alfonso Daniel Rodríguez Castelao, Galician politician, writer, painter and doctor; one of the foremost advocates for Galician self-determination in the 20th century.
- Xose Manuel Beiras, politician, founding leader of the BNG.
- Xosé Luís Méndez Ferrín, writer, former president of the Royal Galician Academy and member of the Frente Popular Galega; a candidate proposed for the Nobel Prize in Literature in 1999.
- Camilo Nogueira Román, politician.
- Ricardo Carvalho Calero, linguist, founder of the reintegrationist movement and of the Galician Association of Language.
- Teresa Moure, writer and feminist, lecturer in Linguistics at the University of Santiago de Compostela.
- Uxío Novoneyra, poet, journalist and writer.
- Lois Pereiro, poet.
- Rafa Villar, writer, activist of the Nunca Máis movement and former town councillor in Santiago de Compostela.

== Gallery ==
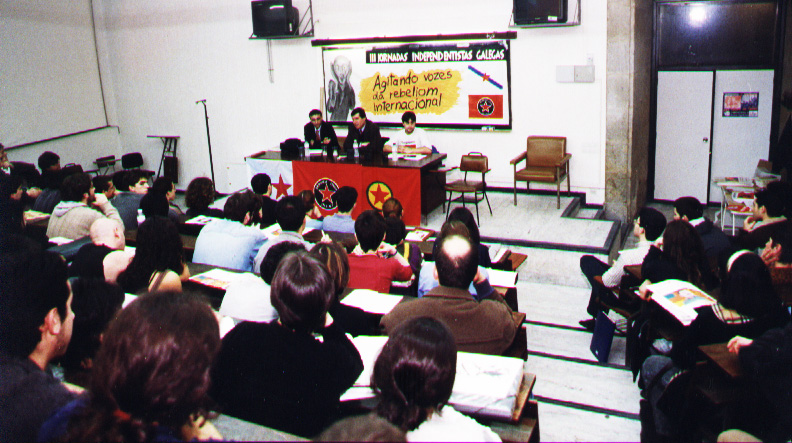
Third Galician Independentist Conference, organised by Primeira Linha in Compostela, 1999.

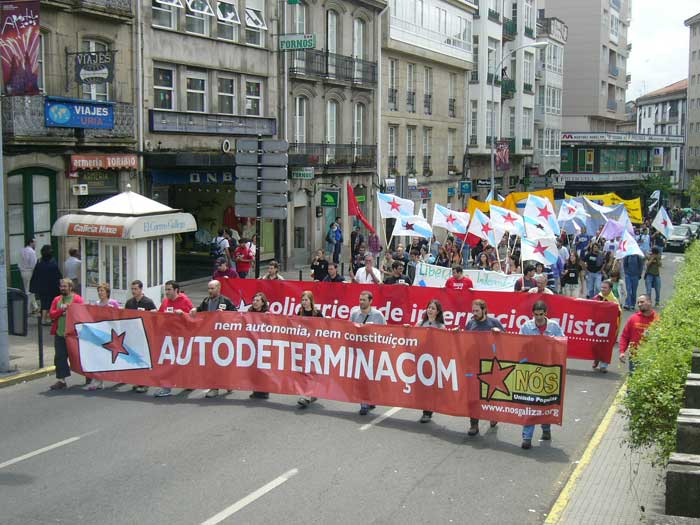
Nós-Unidade Popular demonstration on 25 July 2005.

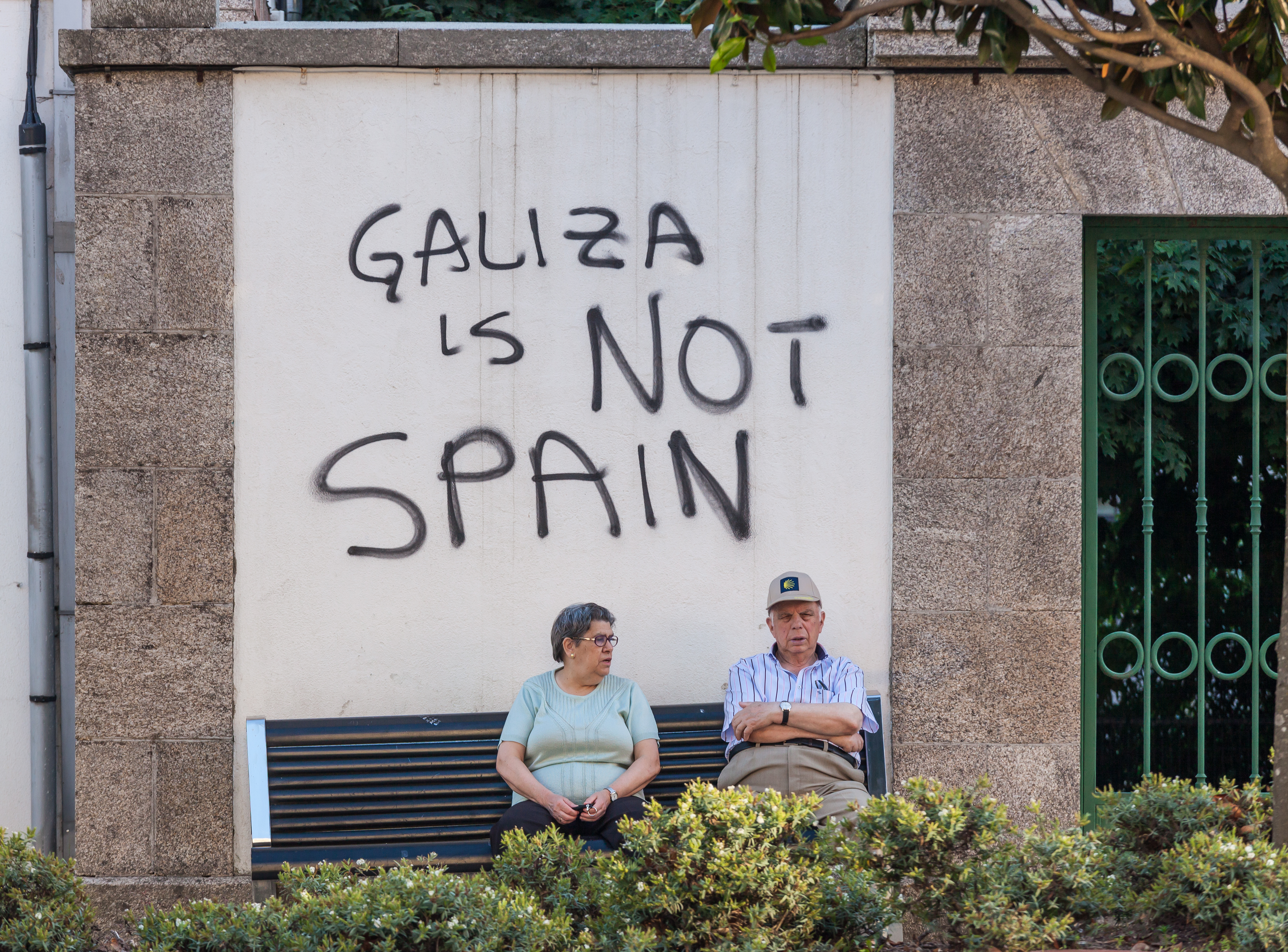
Graffiti in Santiago de Compostela.

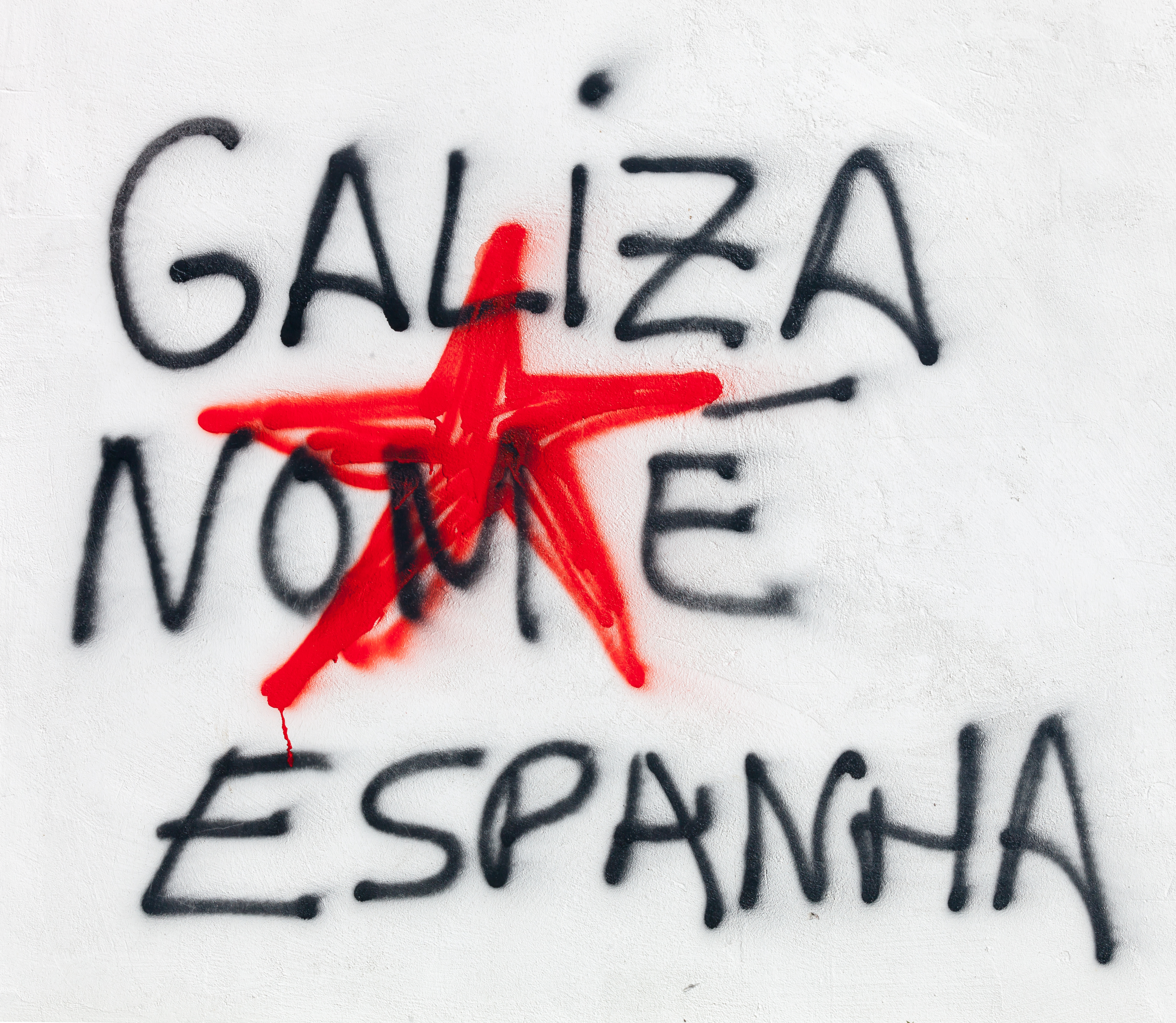
Graffiti in Louro, Muros, written in reintegrationist Galician.

== See also ==
- Galician nationalism
- Galicia irredenta
- Gallaecia
- Kingdom of Galicia
- Republic of Galicia
- Galician Nationalist Bloc
- National and regional identity in Spain
