= Republic of Galicia =

Republic of Galicia República Galega
- 1931
- Anthem: Os Pinos
- Location of the Galician State (red) within Spain (cream).
- Capital: Santiago de Compostela
- Common languages: Galician
- Leader
  - 1931: Antonio Alonso Ríos
- Historical era: Interwar period
  - Established: 27 June 1931
  - Disestablished: 28 June 1931
Preceded by	Succeeded by
Second Spanish Republic	Second Spanish Republic
- Today part of: Spain

The Republic of Galicia (Galician: República Galega) was a short-lived Galician state that existed for only a few hours from 27 June 1931, a day ahead of the election to the Second Spanish Republic's Constitutional Assembly, to 28 June 1931. It was proclaimed by Galician nationalist and striking railway workers who had just lost their jobs after the Council of Ministers decided to end construction of a railway between Zamora and A Coruña. While ideas on independence were floated on June 25, two days later on June 27, left-nationalist leaders Pedro Campos Couceiro and Antón Alonso Ríos declared that full independence from Spain was the only way for Galicia to overcome its secular backwardness and to regain its national dignity. Eventually, negotiations between Spanish forces and the Galician instigators would defuse the movement and stop it from spreading.

== History ==
=== Background ===
Galicia's mountainous geography had always left it feeling isolated from the rest of Spain. With few roads and inadequate rail connections, it seemed to be neglected by the central states. In 1927, construction began on a railway line linking Zamora and A Coruña with hopes that it would rescue the region from its isolation. However, the difficult terrain and the high cost of construction made it far more challenging than other railway projects of the time.

Despite the challenges, the railway project continued until the fall of Primo de Rivera's dictatorship in 1931. With the new Second Spanish Republic only two months old, the government needed to find ways to cut credit on infrastructure as it was more focused on securing control of the country than ensuring people had work. Consequently, Minister of Finance Indalecio Prieto deemed the Zamora-La Coruña railway line unprofitable and, on June 23, got the Council of Ministers to agree on suspending its construction. This decision immediately left over 12,000 workers, known as "Carrilán", jobless, and they soon went on strike in protest of the government's actions.

=== Formation ===
The strike was supported by local merchants and the petty bourgeoisie and lasted for three days until June 25. On the last day, at two in the morning, a crowd of workers stormed and occupied the city hall in Ourense. Protesters raised the Galician flag on the main balcony while a man gave a speech proclaiming the Republic of Galicia. Despite the strike officially ending there, a separate demonstration began out in the streets against the government.

Two days later, on June 27, a rally in the Galicia capital of Santiago de Compostela would bring together communist and Galician nationalist to proclaim an independent Galicia with some even advocating for a Soviet Galicia. At the end of the rally, the imposing crowd went into the city hall and raised the Galician flag on the building. All the local government officials immediately resigned and Antón Alonso Ríos, who in Buenos Aires had directed Casares Quiroga's Autonomous Galician Republican Organization, was chosen as president.

At the same time, labour unions in Ourense called for a general strike and protesters in Sanabria raised the Galician flag over their city hall.

=== Dissolution ===
On June 28, before any other area could join the insurrection, the Spanish government gave in to the demands of the strikers and resumed construction of the railway.

== Legacy and repercussion ==
A number of leftist organizations and champions of Galician national sovereignty still celebrate 27 June despite how short the republic lived. The news had an impact on the Galician, Spanish and international press, and was reviewed by John dos Passos for the daily newspaper Chicago Tribune.

== See also ==
- Galicia
- Galician nationalism
