= Reintegrationism =

Linguistic movement regarding the unity of Galician and Portuguese

Reintegrationism (reintegracionismo, Galician: [rejnteɣɾaθjoˈnizmʊ, -asjo-], European Portuguese: [ʁɛ.ĩtɨɣɾɐsjuˈniʒmu]) is a linguistic and cultural movement in Galicia that argues for the recognition of Galician and Portuguese as a single pluricentric language. According to this perspective, the various dialects spoken in Galicia, Asturias (Eonavian), Portugal, Brazil, and Lusophone Africa belong to a shared linguistic system referred to as Galician-Portuguese. The oldest and largest entity in this movement is the Galician Language Association, led by president Jon Amil.

The movement contrasts with the "isolationist" or "autonomist" position held by the Royal Galician Academy (RAG), which treats Galician as an independent Romance language. While the official RAG norm is used in government and education, Reintegrationists advocate for the adoption of orthographic standards that align Galician with standard Portuguese to facilitate international communication and cultural exchange within the Lusophony.

== Background ==
Reintegrationists argue that the official orthography of the Galician language, regulated by the Royal Galician Academy (RAG), is heavily Castilianized and creates an artificial barrier between Galician and Northern Portuguese dialects. This Spanish influence is rooted in the "Dark Centuries" (Séculos Escuros), a period between the 16th and 18th centuries when Galician lacked official status and a written standard, leading to significant phonetic and lexical borrowing from Spanish.

During the 19th-century Rexurdimento, authors often struggled to codify the language due to the absence of a unified standard, frequently relying on Spanish orthographic conventions to represent Galician phonology. The modern RAG grammar, largely established by the 1982 Decreto Filgueira, is viewed by critics as a continuation of this trend, intended to ensure the language's distinctness from Portuguese to facilitate its institutional recognition within the Spanish state.

The Galician Language Association (AGAL) was established in 1981, initially focusing on the document Estudo crítico das normativas ortográficas e morfolóxicas do idioma galego. It officially published its own standard grammar in 1983, which restores etymological features of Old Galician-Portuguese to align Galician with modern varieties of Portuguese. The primary objective of the association is to reinsert Galician into a broader international diasystem encompassing Portugal, Brazil, and Lusophone Africa.

== Practicalities ==
In writing, the most obvious differences from the official norm (NOMIGa) are (according to AGAL):

- Use of ⟨nh⟩ instead of the letter ⟨ñ⟩ to represent the palatal nasal sound. For example: caminho instead of camiño (way).
- Use of ⟨mh⟩ instead of ⟨nh⟩ to represent the velar nasal sound. For example: algumha instead of algunha.
- Use of the digraph ⟨lh⟩ instead of ⟨ll⟩ to represent the palatal lateral sound. For example: coelho instead of coello (rabbit)
- Use of ⟨çom⟩/⟨ção⟩ and ⟨çons⟩/⟨ções⟩ instead of the suffix ⟨ción⟩ and ⟨cións⟩. For example: associaçom/associação instead of asociación and associaçons/associações instead of asociacións (association, associations)
- Preference for the use of suffixes ⟨aria⟩ and ⟨vel⟩ over ⟨ería⟩ and ⟨ble⟩ or even ⟨bel⟩. For example: livraria instead of librería (bookshop); incrível instead of incrible or incríbel (incredible)
- Use of ⟨ss⟩ between vowels, when appropriate, instead of the simplified ⟨s⟩ for all cases. For example: associação instead of asociación
- Use of either ⟨x⟩, ⟨j⟩ or ⟨g⟩ preceding ⟨e⟩ or ⟨i⟩, according to the etymology of the word, instead of ⟨x⟩ for all cases. For example: hoje instead of hoxe (today), geral instead of xeral (general), but exército as in exército (army)
- Use of ⟨m⟩ instead of ⟨n⟩ at the end of a word. For example: som instead of son (sound)
- Use of a wider range of accentuation signs instead of the simplified single stroke. For example: português instead of portugués (Portuguese), comentário instead of comentario (commentary). Note that the official orthography, being a calque of the Spanish one in that respect, does not cater for any difference between open and closed vowels, since Spanish does not have them.
- Avoidance of specific lexical choices introduced by Spanish

Galician members of the European Parliament (such as José Posada, Camilo Nogueira and Xosé Manuel Beiras) have used spoken Galician when addressing the chamber and have used standard Portuguese orthography to encode their Galician speech. In all cases, these interventions and encodings have been accepted by the Parliament as a valid form of Portuguese, that is, an official language of the European Union.

Furthermore, members of Galician reintegrationist associations have been regularly present at meetings of the Community of Portuguese Language Countries. In 2008, Galician delegates were invited as speakers to the Portuguese Parliament when discussing the new spelling norms for the Portuguese language. At 2024, four Galician entities (Galician Academy of the Portuguese Language, Galician Language Association, Consello da Cultura Galega and Docentes de Português na Galiza) hold the Consultive Member status at the CPLP.

== Controversy ==
The majority of the Galician population was educated in Spanish only (as official use of Galician was rare or even absent for centuries,especially in Francoist Spain).

In this fashion, it is argued that Galician would be faithful to its history and etymology and subsequently its written norm would be more scientific and precise. Thus, it would allow Galician speakers to have direct access to a world culture and it would also clarify some spelling problems of the isolationist norm (for example in terms of stress).

A number of Portuguese linguists and authors such as Luís Lindley Cintra, Manuel Rodrigues Lapa, Fernando Venâncio, Carlos Reis or Malaca Casteleiro have expressed their agreement with the reintegrationist views.

=== Genesis of the debate ===
Authors such as Castelao, among others, stated that Galician should gradually merge with Portuguese, namely in its written form.

The Lusitanian and Galician languages are the same.

— Padre Feijóo, Theatro Critico Universal, 1726

There are two opinions on the orthographic norms of our native language: the phonetic ... influenced by the domination of Spanish, and another one ... where etymology is its main and most logical attribute ... because (Portuguese orthography) is the natural orthography of the Galician language, and I cannot understand how there still are not only doubts about this, but even opinions against it ... with no scientific basis.

— Roberto Blanco Torres, La unificación ortográfica del idioma gallego, 1930

There is a reason why our language is the same as in Portugal ... Our languages must become the same one again.

— Otero Pedrayo, Discursos Parlamentarios, 1933

Galician is a wide-spread and useful language which—with small variations—is spoken in Brazil, Portugal and in the Portuguese colonies.

— Castelao, Sempre en Galiza, 1944

However, political issues forced the resignation of Carvalho Calero and, consequently, the 1979 pro-reintegrationist norms were revoked. The new official norms and reforms passed from 1982 onwards would be strongly pro-isolationist.

== See also ==
- Castrapo
- Community of Portuguese Language Countries
- Galician language
- Galician Language Association
- Galician-Portuguese
- Partido da Terra
- Portuguese language
- Ricardo Carvalho Calero
- Spelling reform
