= 2005 Galician regional election =

Election in the Spanish region of Galicia

- 19 June 2005

All 75 seats in the Parliament of Galicia 38 seats needed for a majority
- Opinion polls
- Registered: 2,616,811 ▲1.9%
- Turnout: 1,680,202 (64.2%) ▲4.0 pp
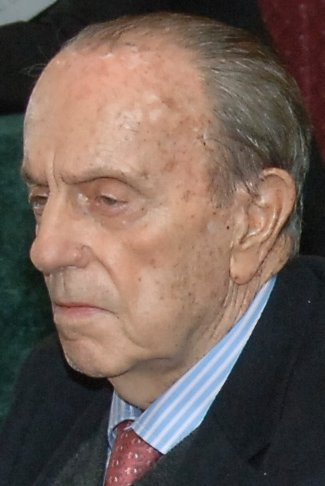

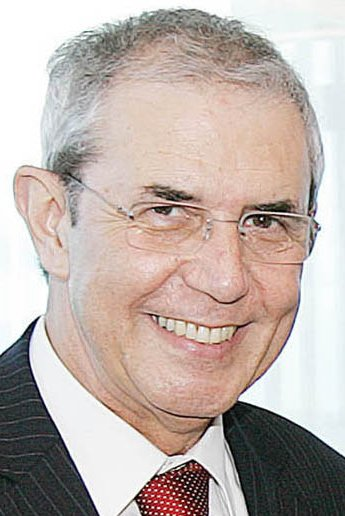

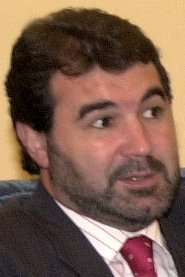
	First party	Second party	Third party
Leader	Manuel Fraga	Emilio Pérez Touriño	Anxo Quintana
Party	PP	PSdeG–PSOE	BNG
Leader since	1989	10 October 1998	23 November 2003
Leader's seat	Lugo	Pontevedra	Ourense
Last election	41 seats, 51.6%	17 seats, 21.8%	17 seats, 22.6%
Seats won	37	25	13
Seat change	▼4	▲8	▼4
Popular vote	756,562	555,603	311,954
Percentage	45.2%	33.2%	18.7%
Swing	▼6.4 pp	▲11.4 pp	▼3.9 pp
- Constituency results map for the Parliament of Galicia
President before election
Manuel Fraga
PP
President after election
Emilio Pérez Touriño
PSdeG–PSOE

A regional election was held in Galicia on 19 June 2005 to elect the 7th Parliament of the autonomous community. All 75 seats in the Parliament were up for election.

== Overview ==
Under the 1981 Statute of Autonomy, the Parliament of Galicia was the unicameral legislature of the homonymous autonomous community, having legislative power in devolved matters, as well as the ability to grant or withdraw confidence from a regional president. The electoral and procedural rules were supplemented by national law provisions.

=== Date ===
The term of the Parliament of Galicia expired four years after the date of its previous election, unless it was dissolved earlier. The election decree was required to be issued no later than 25 days before the scheduled expiration date of parliament and published on the following day in the Official Journal of Galicia (DOG), with election day taking place 54 days after the decree's publication. The previous election was held on 21 October 2001, which meant that the chamber's term would have expired on 21 October 2005. The election decree was required to be published in the DOG no later than 27 September 2005, setting the latest possible date for election day on 20 November 2005.

The regional president had the prerogative to dissolve the Parliament of Galicia at any given time and call a snap election, provided that it did not occur before one year after a previous one under this procedure. In the event of an investiture process failing to elect a regional president within a two-month period from the first ballot, the Parliament was to be automatically dissolved and a fresh election called.

The Parliament of Galicia was officially dissolved on 26 April 2005 with the publication of the corresponding decree in the DOG, setting election day for 19 June and scheduling for the chamber to reconvene on 18 July.

=== Electoral system ===
Voting for the Parliament was based on universal suffrage, comprising all Spanish nationals over 18 years of age, registered in Galicia and with full political rights, provided that they had not been deprived of the right to vote by a final sentence, nor were legally incapacitated.

The Parliament of Galicia had a minimum of 60 and a maximum of 80 seats, with electoral provisions fixing its size at 75. All were elected in four multi-member constituencies—corresponding to the provinces of A Coruña, Lugo, Ourense and Pontevedra, each of which was assigned an initial minimum of 10 seats and the remaining 35 distributed in proportion to population—using the D'Hondt method and closed-list proportional voting, with a five percent-threshold of valid votes (including blank ballots) in each constituency. The use of this electoral method resulted in a higher effective threshold depending on district magnitude and vote distribution.

As a result of the aforementioned allocation, each Parliament constituency was entitled the following seats:

Seats	Constituencies
24	A Coruña
22	Pontevedra
15	Lugo
14	Ourense

The law did not provide for by-elections to fill vacant seats; instead, any vacancies arising after the proclamation of candidates and during the legislative term were filled by the next candidates on the party lists or, when required, by designated substitutes.

=== Outgoing parliament ===
The table below shows the composition of the parliamentary groups in the chamber at the time of dissolution.

Parliamentary composition in April 2005
Groups	Parties	Legislators	
Groups	Parties	Seats	Total
People's Parliamentary Group of Galicia	PP	41	41
Galician Nationalist Bloc's Parliamentary Group	BNG	17	17
Socialists of Galicia's Parliamentary Group	PSdeG–PSOE	17	17

== Parties and candidates ==
The electoral law allowed for parties and federations registered in the interior ministry, alliances and groupings of electors to present lists of candidates. Parties and federations intending to form an alliance were required to inform the relevant electoral commission within 10 days of the election call, whereas groupings of electors needed to secure the signature of at least one percent of the electorate in the constituencies for which they sought election, disallowing electors from signing for more than one list.

Below is a list of the main parties and alliances which contested the election:

Candidacy	Parties and alliances	Leading candidate	Ideology	Previous result		Gov.	Ref.
Candidacy	Parties and alliances	Leading candidate	Ideology	Vote %	Seats	Gov.	Ref.
PP	List: People's Party (PP)	Manuel Fraga	Conservatism; Christian democracy	51.6%	41	Yes	
BNG	List: Galician Nationalist Bloc (BNG) – Galician People's Union (UPG) – Socialist Collective (CS) – Galician Nationalist Party–Galicianist Party (PNG–PG) – Nationalist Left (EN) – Inzar (Inzar)	Anxo Quintana	Galician nationalism Left-wing nationalism Socialism	22.6%	17	No	
PSdeG– PSOE	List: Socialists' Party of Galicia (PSdeG–PSOE)	Emilio Pérez Touriño	Social democracy	21.8%	17	No	

== Opinion polls ==
The tables below list opinion polling results in reverse chronological order, showing the most recent first and using the dates when the survey fieldwork was done, as opposed to the date of publication. Where the fieldwork dates are unknown, the date of publication is given instead. The highest percentage figure in each polling survey is displayed with its background shaded in the leading party's colour. If a tie ensues, this is applied to the figures with the highest percentages. The "Lead" column on the right shows the percentage-point difference between the parties with the highest percentages in a poll.

=== Voting intention estimates ===
The table below lists weighted voting intention estimates. Refusals are generally excluded from the party vote percentages, while question wording and the treatment of "don't know" responses and those not intending to vote may vary between polling organisations. When available, seat projections determined by the polling organisations are displayed below (or in place of) the percentages in a smaller font; 38 seats were required for an absolute majority in the Parliament of Galicia.

Color key:

Poll conducted after legal ban on opinion polls Exit poll

Polling firm/Commissioner	Fieldwork date	Sample size	Turnout	PP	BNG	PSdeG–PSOE	EU–IU	Lead
2005 regional election	19 Jun 2005	—N/a	64.2	45.2; 37	18.7; 13	33.2; 25	0.7; 0	12.0
TNS Demoscopia/Antena 3	19 Jun 2005	18,000	?	41.7; 33/35	21.9; 15/17	31.9; 24/26	–	9.8
Ipsos–Eco/CRTVG	19 Jun 2005	?	?	41.5; 32/35	22.6; 16/18	32.0; 23/26	–	9.5
Opina/Cadena SER	13–18 Jun 2005	?	?	46.8; 33/35	11.6; 14/15	37.3; 26/27	–	9.5
Infortécnica	13 Jun 2005	250	?	47.8; 36/38	20.1; 12/15	32.1; 25/26	–	15.7
Opina/Cadena SER	12 Jun 2005	1,000	?	42.0; 34/36	19.0; 15	35.0; 25/26	–	7.0
Infortécnica	12 Jun 2005	250	?	47.6; 36/38	20.4; 12/15	32.0; 25/26	–	15.6
Opina/Cadena SER	11 Jun 2005	1,000	?	42.5; 34/36	19.0; 15/16	35.0; 24/25	–	7.5
Infortécnica	11 Jun 2005	250	?	47.5; 36/38	20.7; 12/15	31.8; 25/26	–	15.7
Sondaxe/La Voz de Galicia	7–11 Jun 2005	2,400	?	42.7; 34	21.4; 16	31.3; 25	–	11.4
Opina/Cadena SER	10 Jun 2005	1,000	?	42.3; 34/35	18.5; 13/14	35.2; 27	–	7.1
Sondaxe/La Voz de Galicia	6–10 Jun 2005	2,400	?	42.6; 34	21.1; 16	32.2; 25	–	10.4
Opina/Cadena SER	9 Jun 2005	1,000	?	43.3; 35	18.4; 13	37.3; 27	–	6.0
Metroscopia/ABC	6–9 Jun 2005	1,500	70	42.5; 35	19.4; 16	35.5; 24	–	7.0
Noxa/La Vanguardia	6–9 Jun 2005	1,200	?	43.3; 34/36	19.6; 14/16	33.9; 24/26	–	9.4
Sondaxe/La Voz de Galicia	5–9 Jun 2005	2,400	?	41.2; 34	22.4; 16	32.8; 25	–	8.4
Iberconsulta/La Razón	30 May–9 Jun 2005	800	62.0	45.5; 36/38	21.0; 14/15	31.4; 23/24	0.7; 0	14.1
Opina/Cadena SER	8 Jun 2005	1,000	?	43.4; 35	18.0; 13	37.5; 27	–	5.9
Opina/El País	7–8 Jun 2005	1,500	?	42.0; 34/35	20.5; 14/15	34.5; 26	–	7.5
Sigma Dos/El Mundo	6–8 Jun 2005	1,000	?	47.1; 37/39	19.7; 13/14	30.2; 23/24	–	16.9
Sondaxe/La Voz de Galicia	4–8 Jun 2005	2,400	?	42.2; 35	22.4; 15	31.2; 25	–	11.0
Opina/Cadena SER	7 Jun 2005	1,000	?	43.9; 35	19.3; 13	35.8; 27	–	8.1
Sondaxe/La Voz de Galicia	3–7 Jun 2005	2,400	?	42.9; 35	21.1; 15	32.1; 25	–	10.8
Anova Multiconsulting/El Correo	31 May–7 Jun 2005	2,000	72.8	45.5; 38	19.2; 14	31.1; 23	–	14.4
Opina/Cadena SER	6 Jun 2005	1,000	?	44.6; 35	18.9; 14	32.2; 26	–	12.4
Sondaxe/La Voz de Galicia	2–6 Jun 2005	2,400	?	42.4; 35	20.7; 15	33.2; 25	–	9.2
Opina/Cadena SER	5 Jun 2005	1,000	?	44.5; 35/37	19.5; 13	32.1; 25/27	–	12.4
Sondaxe/La Voz de Galicia	1–5 Jun 2005	2,400	?	42.9; 35	20.8; 15	32.6; 25	–	10.3
CIS	26 May–5 Jun 2005	3,205	?	43.8; 34/36	21.7; 15	32.7; 24/26	–	10.1
Opina/Cadena SER	4 Jun 2005	1,000	?	43.8; 35/37	18.7; 12/13	33.6; 26/27	–	10.2
Sondaxe/La Voz de Galicia	31 May–4 Jun 2005	2,400	?	44.2; 36	19.5; 14	32.0; 25	–	12.2
Opina/Cadena SER	3 Jun 2005	1,000	?	41.5; 34/35	20.7; 13/14	34.9; 27	–	6.6
Ipsos/Faro de Vigo	1–3 Jun 2005	1,300	64	45.2; 36/39	18.0; 12/15	32.4; 23/27	–	12.8
Sondaxe/La Voz de Galicia	30 May–3 Jun 2005	2,400	?	44.8; 36	18.3; 13	32.2; 26	–	12.6
Opina/Cadena SER	2 Jun 2005	1,000	?	42.0; 35/36	19.8; 13/14	34.2; 26	–	7.8
Sondaxe/La Voz de Galicia	30 May–2 Jun 2005	1,920	?	45.6; 36	18.8; 15	31.5; 24	–	14.1
Infortécnica	19–26 May 2005	2,500	?	? 36/38	? 13/16	? 24/25	–	?
Sondaxe/La Voz de Galicia	20 May 2005	?	?	44.7; 36	20.6; 15	31.8; 24	–	12.9
CIS	29 Apr–11 May 2005	1,594	?	45.6; 36	20.6; 16	32.8; 23	–	12.8
Anova Multiconsulting/El Correo	8 May 2005	?	?	47.4; 36/39	17.6; 14	32.1; 22/25	–	15.3
Opina/El País	2–4 May 2005	1,500	?	45.8; 36/37	16.3; 11/12	33.9; 27	–	11.9
Infortécnica	23 Apr 2005	2,400	?	? 37/40	? 15/16	? 20/22	–	?
PP	22 Apr 2005	6,000	?	? 38/39	? 10/11	? 25/26	–	?
USC	22 Nov–13 Dec 2004	1,200	?	42.2; 34/35	23.4; 17	30.7; 23/24	–	11.5
Sondaxe/La Voz de Galicia	23–29 Nov 2004	?	?	? 36	? 18	? 21	–	?
2004 EP election	13 Jun 2004	—N/a	44.3	47.7 (39)	12.3 (8)	36.2 (28)	1.5 (0)	11.5
2004 general election	14 Mar 2004	—N/a	71.0	47.1 (38)	11.4 (7)	37.2 (30)	1.7 (0)	9.9
Sondaxe/La Voz de Galicia	21 Feb 2003	?	?	42.6; 33	? 21	? 21	–	?
Sondaxe/La Voz de Galicia (Note: Undecided and/or abstentionists excluded.)	19 Oct 2002	?	53.1	45.2	20.2	25.0	–	20.2
CIS	9 Sep–9 Oct 2002	606	66.9	47.5	22.1	24.9	1.6	22.6
Sondaxe/La Voz de Galicia	14 Jul 2002	?	52.5	44.4	21.3	24.4	–	20.0
USC	2 May 2002	?	?	50.8; 40	22.5; 16	24.5; 19	–	26.3
Sondaxe/La Voz de Galicia	7 Apr 2002	?	56.2	48.2	19.4	23.5	–	24.7
Sondaxe/La Voz de Galicia	12 Jan 2002	?	58.9	48.7	23.3	22.9	–	25.4
2001 regional election	21 Oct 2001	—N/a	60.2	51.6; 41	22.6; 17	21.8; 17	0.7; 0	29.0

=== Voting preferences ===
The table below lists raw, unweighted voting preferences.

Polling firm/Commissioner	Fieldwork date	Sample size	PP	BNG	PSdeG–PSOE	EU–IU	Question	X mark	Lead
2005 regional election (Note: Does not include non-resident citizens.)	19 Jun 2005	—N/a	30.5	13.3	22.0	0.5	—N/a	31.9	8.5
CIS	26 May–5 Jun 2005	3,205	31.5	15.6	24.7	1.0	20.7	3.6	6.8
CIS	29 Apr–11 May 2005	1,594	27.8	13.1	24.4	1.4	26.5	4.2	3.4
2004 EP election	13 Jun 2004	—N/a	22.7	6.0	16.6	0.7	—N/a	52.9	6.1
2004 general election	14 Mar 2004	—N/a	35.2	8.9	28.2	1.3	—N/a	23.9	7.0
CIS	9 Sep–9 Oct 2002	606	29.9	12.5	13.2	1.2	33.7	5.8	16.7
2001 regional election	21 Oct 2001	—N/a	29.0	13.3	12.5	0.4	—N/a	35.8	15.7

=== Victory preferences ===
The table below lists opinion polling on the victory preferences for each party in the event of a regional election taking place.

Polling firm/Commissioner	Fieldwork date	Sample size	PP	BNG	PSdeG–PSOE	EU–IU	Other/ None	Question	Lead
CIS	26 May–5 Jun 2005	3,205	34.3	17.0	27.7	0.7	1.6	18.6	6.6
CIS	29 Apr–11 May 2005	1,594	32.5	14.7	29.4	1.5	0.5	21.3	3.1

=== Victory likelihood ===
The table below lists opinion polling on the perceived likelihood of victory for each party in the event of a regional election taking place.

Polling firm/Commissioner	Fieldwork date	Sample size	PP	BNG	PSdeG–PSOE	EU–IU	Other/ None	Question	Lead
CIS	26 May–5 Jun 2005	3,205	66.3	1.2	11.8	0.1	0.7	19.8	54.5
CIS	29 Apr–11 May 2005	1,594	60.0	1.2	13.7	0.1	0.0	25.0	46.3

=== Preferred President ===
The table below lists opinion polling on leader preferences to become president of the Regional Government of Galicia.

Polling firm/Commissioner	Fieldwork date	Sample size				Other/ None/ Not care	Question	Lead
Polling firm/Commissioner	Fieldwork date	Sample size	Fraga PP	Quintana BNG	Touriño PSdeG	Other/ None/ Not care	Question	Lead
Opina/Cadena SER	12 Jun 2005	1,000	29.6	14.3	25.1	4.2	26.8	4.5
Opina/Cadena SER	11 Jun 2005	1,000	29.6	13.5	24.3	4.5	28.2	5.3
Opina/Cadena SER	10 Jun 2005	1,000	29.1	11.7	26.0	6.4	26.8	3.1
Opina/Cadena SER	9 Jun 2005	1,000	29.1	11.4	26.7	6.2	26.5	2.4
Opina/Cadena SER	8 Jun 2005	1,000	29.3	11.1	27.2	6.5	25.9	2.1
Opina/Cadena SER	7 Jun 2005	1,000	29.6	12.0	26.9	6.3	25.3	2.7
Opina/Cadena SER	6 Jun 2005	1,000	31.2	12.9	26.5	4.8	24.5	4.7
Opina/Cadena SER	5 Jun 2005	1,000	31.1	13.1	25.8	5.2	24.9	5.3
CIS	26 May–5 Jun 2005	3,205	31.3	16.6	27.8	3.8	20.4	3.5
Opina/Cadena SER	4 Jun 2005	1,000	32.2	12.8	25.7	5.9	23.6	6.5
Opina/Cadena SER	3 Jun 2005	1,000	31.4	12.5	26.0	6.1	24.0	5.4
Opina/Cadena SER	2 Jun 2005	1,000	31.9	12.1	25.9	6.1	24.1	6.0
CIS	29 Apr–11 May 2005	1,594	30.4	14.2	27.5	2.6	25.3	2.9

=== Predicted President ===
The table below lists opinion polling on the perceived likelihood for each leader to become president of the Regional Government of Galicia.

Polling firm/Commissioner	Fieldwork date	Sample size				Other/ None/ Not care	Question	Lead
Polling firm/Commissioner	Fieldwork date	Sample size	Fraga PP	Quintana BNG	Touriño PSdeG	Other/ None/ Not care	Question	Lead
Opina/Cadena SER	12 Jun 2005	1,000	37.6	1.4	22.4	0.8	37.9	15.2
Opina/Cadena SER	11 Jun 2005	1,000	39.6	1.5	19.7	0.5	38.7	19.9
Opina/Cadena SER	10 Jun 2005	1,000	42.1	1.9	20.4	0.6	35.0	21.7
Opina/Cadena SER	9 Jun 2005	1,000	42.8	2.0	21.0	0.6	33.6	21.8
Opina/Cadena SER	8 Jun 2005	1,000	44.4	1.9	20.2	0.7	32.8	24.2
Opina/Cadena SER	7 Jun 2005	1,000	44.3	1.9	20.2	0.9	32.8	24.1
Opina/Cadena SER	6 Jun 2005	1,000	44.1	2.1	19.5	0.5	33.9	24.6
Opina/Cadena SER	5 Jun 2005	1,000	44.0	2.1	18.9	0.5	34.5	25.1
Opina/Cadena SER	4 Jun 2005	1,000	47.3	1.9	18.3	0.6	31.9	29.0
Opina/Cadena SER	3 Jun 2005	1,000	47.5	1.5	18.3	0.7	32.1	29.2
Opina/Cadena SER	2 Jun 2005	1,000	47.6	1.4	17.6	0.6	32.9	30.0

== Results ==
=== Overall ===
← Summary of the 19 June 2005 Parliament of Galicia election results →
Parties and alliances	Popular vote			Seats	
Parties and alliances	Votes	%	±pp	Total	+/−
People's Party (PP)	756,562	45.23	−6.39	37	−4
Socialists' Party of Galicia (PSdeG–PSOE)	555,603	33.22	+11.39	25	+8
Galician Nationalist Bloc (BNG)	311,954	18.65	−3.93	13	−4
United Left (EU–IU)	12,419	0.74	+0.06	0	±0
Galician People's Front (FPG)	2,982	0.18	−0.03	0	±0
Party of Self-employed and Professionals (AUTONOMO)	2,840	0.17	−0.12	0	±0
Democratic and Social Centre (CDS)	2,412	0.14	New	0	±0
We–People's Unity (Nós–UP)	1,749	0.10	New	0	±0
Humanist Party (PH)	1,429	0.09	−0.18	0	±0
Spanish Phalanx of the CNSO (FE–JONS)	1,081	0.06	New	0	±0
Ourensan Democracy (DO)	623	0.04	New	0	±0
National Democracy (DN)	550	0.03	New	0	±0
People's Spanish Social Party (PSEP)	420	0.03	New	0	±0
Republican Left–Galician Republican Left (IR–ERG)	405	0.02	New	0	±0
Galician Identity (IG)	376	0.02	New	0	±0
Social Democratic Party of Law (SDD)	239	0.01	−0.03	0	±0
Blank ballots	20,912	1.25	−0.44		
Total	1,672,556			75	±0
Valid votes	1,672,556	99.54	+0.24		
Invalid votes	7,646	0.46	−0.24		
Votes cast / turnout	1,680,202	64.21	+4.05		
Abstentions	936,609	35.79	−4.05		
Registered voters	2,616,811				

Popular vote
PP	45.23%
PSdeG–PSOE	33.22%
BNG	18.65%
Others	1.65%
Blank ballots	1.25%

Seats
PP	49.33%
PSdeG–PSOE	33.33%
BNG	17.33%

=== Distribution by constituency ===
Constituency	PP		PSdeG		BNG	
Constituency	%	S	%	S	%	S
A Coruña	42.9	11	33.2	8	20.5	5
Lugo	48.9	8	34.5	5	14.5	2
Ourense	50.8	8	30.9	4	16.3	2
Pontevedra	44.1	10	33.6	8	19.2	4
Total	45.2	37	33.2	25	18.7	13

== Aftermath ==
=== Government formation ===
Investiture; Nomination of Emilio Pérez Touriño (PSdeG)
Ballot →	29 July 2005
Required majority →	38 out of 75
Yes: • PSdeG (25); • BNG (13)	38 / 75
No: • PP (37)	37 / 75
Abstentions	0 / 75
Absentees	0 / 75

== Bibliography ==
- Ley Orgánica 1/1981, de 6 de abril, de Estatuto de Autonomía para Galicia (Organic Law 1/1981). Official State Gazette (in Spanish). 6 April 1981 [version as of 2 July 2002]. BOE-A-1981-9564.
- Ley 1/1983, de 22 de febrero, reguladora de la Junta y su Presidente (Law 1/1983). Official State Gazette (in Spanish). 22 February 1983 [version as of 30 December 2002]. BOE-A-1983-23788.
- Ley Orgánica 5/1985, de 19 de junio, del Régimen Electoral General (Organic Law 5/1985). Official State Gazette (in Spanish). 19 June 1985 [version as of 29 November 2003]. BOE-A-1985-11672.
- Ley 8/1985, de 13 de agosto, de elecciones al Parlamento de Galicia (Law 8/1985). Official State Gazette (in Spanish). 13 August 1985 [version as of 16 December 2004]. BOE-A-1985-21380.
- Decreto 77/2005, de 25 de abril, de disolución del Parlamento de Galicia y de convocatoria de eleccione (PDF) (Decree 77/2005). Official Journal of Galicia (in Spanish). 25 April 2005.
