= 2009 Galician regional election =

Election in the Spanish region of Galicia

- 1 March 2009

All 75 seats in the Parliament of Galicia 38 seats needed for a majority
- Opinion polls
- Registered: 2,648,276 ▲1.2%
- Turnout: 1,706,198 (64.4%) ▲0.2 pp
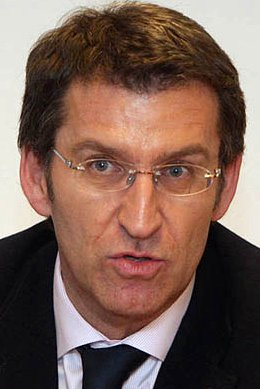

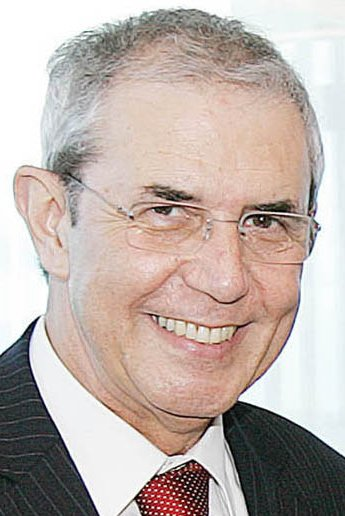

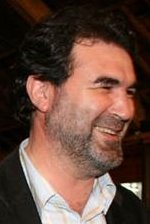
| | First party | Second party | Third party |
|---|---|---|---|
| Leader | Alberto Núñez Feijóo | Emilio Pérez Touriño | Anxo Quintana |
| Party | PP | PSdeG–PSOE | BNG |
| Leader since | 15 January 2006 | 10 October 1998 | 23 November 2003 |
| Leader's seat | Pontevedra | Pontevedra | Ourense |
| Last election | 37 seats, 45.2% | 25 seats, 33.2% | 13 seats, 18.7% |
| Seats won | 38 | 25 | 12 |
| Seat change | ▲1 | 0 | ▼1 |
| Popular vote | 789,427 | 524,488 | 270,712 |
| Percentage | 46.7% | 31.0% | 16.0% |
| Swing | ▲1.5 pp | ▼2.2 pp | ▼2.7 pp |
- Constituency results map for the Parliament of Galicia
President before election
Emilio Pérez Touriño
PSdeG–PSOE
President after election
Alberto Núñez Feijóo
PP

A regional election was held in Galicia on 1 March 2009 to elect the 8th Parliament of the autonomous community. All 75 seats in the Parliament were up for election. It was held concurrently with a regional election in the Basque Country.

The election saw the People's Party (PP) retake control of the parliament from the coalition of the Socialists' Party of Galicia (PSdeG–PSOE) and the Galician Nationalist Bloc (BNG), with a majority of 1 seat. As a result, Alberto Núñez Feijoo became the new President of Galicia.

== Overview ==
Under the 1981 Statute of Autonomy, the Parliament of Galicia was the unicameral legislature of the homonymous autonomous community, having legislative power in devolved matters, as well as the ability to grant or withdraw confidence from a regional president. The electoral and procedural rules were supplemented by national law provisions.

=== Date ===
The term of the Parliament of Galicia expired four years after the date of its previous election, unless it was dissolved earlier. The election decree was required to be issued no later than 25 days before the scheduled expiration date of parliament and published on the following day in the Official Journal of Galicia (DOG), with election day taking place 54 days after the decree's publication. The previous election was held on 19 June 2005, which meant that the chamber's term would have expired on 19 June 2009. The election decree was required to be published in the DOG no later than 26 May 2009, setting the latest possible date for election day on 19 July 2009.

The regional president had the prerogative to dissolve the Parliament of Galicia at any given time and call a snap election, provided that it did not occur before one year after a previous one under this procedure. In the event of an investiture process failing to elect a regional president within a two-month period from the first ballot, the Parliament was to be automatically dissolved and a fresh election called.

The Parliament of Galicia was officially dissolved on 6 January 2009 with the publication of the corresponding decree in the DOG, setting election day for 1 March and scheduling for the chamber to reconvene on 1 April.

=== Electoral system ===
Voting for the Parliament was based on universal suffrage, comprising all Spanish nationals over 18 years of age, registered in Galicia and with full political rights, provided that they had not been deprived of the right to vote by a final sentence, nor were legally incapacitated.

The Parliament of Galicia had a minimum of 60 and a maximum of 80 seats, with electoral provisions fixing its size at 75. All were elected in four multi-member constituencies—corresponding to the provinces of A Coruña, Lugo, Ourense and Pontevedra, each of which was assigned an initial minimum of 10 seats and the remaining 35 distributed in proportion to population—using the D'Hondt method and closed-list proportional voting, with a five percent-threshold of valid votes (including blank ballots) in each constituency. The use of this electoral method resulted in a higher effective threshold depending on district magnitude and vote distribution.

As a result of the aforementioned allocation, each Parliament constituency was entitled the following seats:

| Seats | Constituencies |
|---|---|
| 24 | A Coruña |
| 22 | Pontevedra |
| 15 | Lugo |
| 14 | Ourense |

The law did not provide for by-elections to fill vacant seats; instead, any vacancies arising after the proclamation of candidates and during the legislative term were filled by the next candidates on the party lists or, when required, by designated substitutes.

=== Outgoing parliament ===
The table below shows the composition of the parliamentary groups in the chamber at the time of dissolution.

Parliamentary composition in January 2009
| Groups | Parties | Legislators | |
| Groups | Parties | Seats | Total |
|---|---|---|---|
| People's Parliamentary Group of Galicia | PP | 37 | 37 |
| Socialists of Galicia's Parliamentary Group | PSdeG–PSOE | 25 | 25 |
| Galician Nationalist Bloc's Parliamentary Group | BNG | 13 | 13 |

== Parties and candidates ==
The electoral law allowed for parties and federations registered in the interior ministry, alliances and groupings of electors to present lists of candidates. Parties and federations intending to form an alliance were required to inform the relevant electoral commission within 10 days of the election call, whereas groupings of electors needed to secure the signature of at least one percent of the electorate in the constituencies for which they sought election, disallowing electors from signing for more than one list. Amendments in 2007 required a balanced composition of men and women in the electoral lists, so that candidates of either sex made up at least 40 percent of the total composition.

Below is a list of the main parties and alliances which contested the election:

| Candidacy | Parties and alliances | Leading candidate | Ideology | Previous result | | Gov. | Ref. |
| Candidacy | Parties and alliances | Leading candidate | Ideology | Vote % | Seats | Gov. | Ref. |
|---|---|---|---|---|---|---|---|
| PP | List: People's Party (PP) | Alberto Núñez Feijóo | Conservatism; Christian democracy | 45.2% | 37 | No | |
| PSdeG– PSOE | List: Socialists' Party of Galicia (PSdeG–PSOE) | Emilio Pérez Touriño | Social democracy | 33.2% | 25 | Yes | |
| BNG | List: Galician Nationalist Bloc (BNG) – Galician People's Union (UPG) – Socialist Collective (CS) – Galician Nationalist Party–Galicianist Party (PNG–PG) – Nationalist Left (EN) – Inzar (Inzar) – Movement for the Grassroots (MpB) – Irmandiño Meeting (EI) – Galician Socialist Space (ESG) | Anxo Quintana | Galician nationalism Left-wing nationalism Socialism | 18.7% | 13 | Yes | |

== Opinion polls ==
The tables below list opinion polling results in reverse chronological order, showing the most recent first and using the dates when the survey fieldwork was done, as opposed to the date of publication. Where the fieldwork dates are unknown, the date of publication is given instead. The highest percentage figure in each polling survey is displayed with its background shaded in the leading party's colour. If a tie ensues, this is applied to the figures with the highest percentages. The "Lead" column on the right shows the percentage-point difference between the parties with the highest percentages in a poll.

=== Voting intention estimates ===
The table below lists weighted voting intention estimates. Refusals are generally excluded from the party vote percentages, while question wording and the treatment of "don't know" responses and those not intending to vote may vary between polling organisations. When available, seat projections determined by the polling organisations are displayed below (or in place of) the percentages in a smaller font; 38 seats were required for an absolute majority in the Parliament of Galicia.

Color key:

Poll conducted after legal ban on opinion polls Exit poll

| Polling firm/Commissioner | Fieldwork date | Sample size | Turnout | PP | PSdeG–PSOE | BNG | EU–IU | UPyD | Lead |
|---|---|---|---|---|---|---|---|---|---|
| 2009 regional election | 1 Mar 2009 | —N/a | 64.4 | 46.7; 38 | 31.0; 25 | 16.0; 12 | 1.0; 0 | 1.4; 0 | 15.7 |
| Ipsos/Popular TV | 1 Mar 2009 | ? | ? | ? 35/38 | ? 24/27 | ? 11/13 | – | – | ? |
| Ipsos/CRTVG | 1 Mar 2009 | 21,719 | 69.2 | 44.6; 36/38 | 31.7; 25/27 | 17.2; 11/13 | 1.2; 0 | 1.2; 0 | 12.9 |
| TNS Demoscopia/Antena 3 | 1 Mar 2009 | ? | ? | ? 37/39 | ? 24/26 | ? 11/13 | – | – | ? |
| Sondaxe/La Voz de Galicia | 25–28 Feb 2009 | 2,000 | 68.2 | 44.4; 37 | 29.7; 25 | 17.8; 13 | – | – | 14.7 |
| Sondaxe/La Voz de Galicia | 24–27 Feb 2009 | 2,000 | 64.9 | 44.1; 37 | 29.7; 24 | 17.9; 14 | – | – | 14.4 |
| Sondaxe/La Voz de Galicia | 23–26 Feb 2009 | 2,000 | 64.9 | 44.1; 37 | 29.2; 24 | 18.0; 14 | – | – | 14.9 |
| Sondaxe/La Voz de Galicia | 22–25 Feb 2009 | 2,000 | 63.8 | 43.8; 37 | 29.1; 24 | 19.2; 14 | – | – | 14.7 |
| Sondaxe/La Voz de Galicia | 21–24 Feb 2009 | 2,000 | 64.8 | 43.3; 37 | 30.0; 25 | 19.5; 13 | – | – | 13.3 |
| Sondaxe/La Voz de Galicia | 20–23 Feb 2009 | 2,000 | 65.2 | 42.8; 36 | 29.5; 26 | 18.5; 13 | – | – | 13.3 |
| Obradoiro de Socioloxía/El Progreso (Note: "PSOE y BNG podrían repetir gobierno aunque el PP muestra tendencia al avance" (PDF). El Progreso (in Spanish). 22 February 2009. Archived from the original on 5 February 2012.) | 22 Feb 2009 | ? | ? | ? 35/36 | ? 25/26 | ? 14 | – | – | ? |
| Quadernas Consultoría/Xornal (Note: "El PSOE y el BNG tienen a Feijóo pisándole los talones en la recta final". Xornal de Galicia (in Spanish). 22 February 2009.) | 22 Feb 2009 | ? | ? | 43.8; 35 | 30.3; 24 | 19.8; 16 | – | – | 13.5 |
| Ipsos/Faro de Vigo | 22 Feb 2009 | ? | 61 | 43.6; 35/36 | 33.0; 26/27 | 17.5; 13/14 | 1.0; 0 | 1.6; 0 | 10.6 |
| Sondaxe/La Voz de Galicia | 18–21 Feb 2009 | 2,000 | 65.1 | 42.4; 36 | 29.6; 26 | 18.9; 13 | – | – | 12.8 |
| Sondaxe/La Voz de Galicia | 17–20 Feb 2009 | 2,000 | 64.9 | 42.3; 36 | 29.2; 26 | 18.8; 13 | – | – | 13.1 |
| NC Report/La Razón (Note: "El PP se acerca al cambio en Galicia". La Razón (in Spanish). 22 February 2009. Archived from the original on 26 February 2009.) | 16–20 Feb 2009 | 1,000 | 62.3 | 44.4; 35/37 | 32.2; 25/26 | 19.7; 13/14 | 1.1; 0 | 1.6; 0 | 12.2 |
| Infortécnica/La Región (Note: "Máximo equilibrio en la carrera final hacia el 1-M". La Región (in Spanish). 22 February 2009.) | 16–19 Feb 2009 | 2,006 | ? | 48.0– 50.7; 37/38 | 30.7– 34.6; 24/25 | 16.0– 18.7; 13 | – | – | 16.1– 17.3 |
| Sondaxe/La Voz de Galicia | 16–19 Feb 2009 | 2,000 | 65.0 | 42.5; 36 | 28.8; 26 | 18.7; 13 | – | – | 13.7 |
| DYM/ABC | 16–19 Feb 2009 | 816 | ? | 45.7; 37/38 | 28.5; 22/23 | 21.6; 15/16 | – | 1.3; 0 | 17.2 |
| Sigma Dos/El Mundo | 13–19 Feb 2009 | 1,300 | ? | 44.5; 36/38 | 33.1; 25/26 | 18.1; 12/13 | – | – | 11.4 |
| Obradoiro de Socioloxía/Público (Note: "El PP, a un escaño de volver al poder en Galicia". Público (in Spanish). 21 February 2009. Archived from the original on 24 February 2009.) | 12–19 Feb 2009 | 2,411 | ? | 45.3; 36/37 | 30.2; 23/24 | 19.4; 14/16 | – | – | 15.1 |
| Sondaxe/La Voz de Galicia | 15–18 Feb 2009 | 2,000 | 64.8 | 43.0; 36 | 30.2; 25 | 19.2; 14 | – | – | 12.8 |
| Sondaxe/La Voz de Galicia | 14–17 Feb 2009 | 2,000 | 64.9 | 43.1; 35 | 30.3; 26 | 18.7; 14 | – | – | 12.8 |
| TNS Demoscopia/Antena 3 (Note: "El PP ganaría las elecciones gallegas aunque sin mayoría absoluta". Antena 3 (in Spanish). 19 February 2009.) | 13–16 Feb 2009 | ? | 64.8 | 43.5; 35/37 | 32.8; 24/26 | 19.5; 13/15 | – | – | 10.7 |
| Sondaxe/La Voz de Galicia | 13–16 Feb 2009 | 2,000 | 64.8 | 42.6; 35 | 31.8; 26 | 18.9; 14 | – | – | 10.8 |
| Anova Multiconsulting/El Correo (Note: "El bipartito consolida su mayoría aunque el PP conserva un amplio apoyo de los electores". El Correo Gallego (in Spanish). 22 February 2009. Archived from the original on 25 February 2009.) | 12–16 Feb 2009 | 2,000 | 66.4 | 43.1; 35/37 | 32.4; 24/25 | 20.9; 14/15 | – | – | 10.7 |
| Metroscopia/El País (Note: "El bipartito gallego resiste" (PDF). El País (in Spanish). 22 February 2009. Archived from the original on 10 December 2011.) | 12–16 Feb 2009 | 1,600 | 60.5 | 44.1; 36 | 33.8; 25/27 | 18.0; 12/14 | – | – | 10.3 |
| Noxa/La Vanguardia | 10–16 Feb 2009 | 1,000 | ? | 43.8; 35/37 | 31.7; 24/26 | 19.9; 13/15 | 0.7; 0 | 1.7; 0 | 12.1 |
| ASCA/Galicia Diario | 15 Feb 2009 | ? | ? | ? 39 | ? 23 | ? 13 | – | – | ? |
| Sondaxe/La Voz de Galicia | 12–15 Feb 2009 | 2,000 | 65.0 | 41.9; 35 | 31.9; 26 | 19.2; 14 | – | – | 10.0 |
| Sondaxe/La Voz de Galicia | 11–14 Feb 2009 | 2,000 | 65.4 | 42.1; 34 | 31.6; 27 | 19.1; 14 | – | – | 10.5 |
| Infortécnica/La Región | 13 Feb 2009 | 1,953 | ? | 48.0– 50.6; 36/38 | 33.3– 34.6; 25/27 | 14.6– 17.3; 12/13 | – | – | 14.7– 16.0 |
| Sondaxe/La Voz de Galicia | 10–13 Feb 2009 | 2,000 | ? | 42.4; 35 | 32.1; 27 | 18.4; 13 | – | – | 10.3 |
| NC Report/La Razón (Note: "PSOE y BNG seguirán en la Xunta pese a la mayoría del PP". La Razón (in Spanish). 16 February 2009. Archived from the original on 17 December 2011.) | 9–13 Feb 2009 | 1,000 | 61.2 | 44.1; 35/37 | 32.6; 25/26 | 19.8; 13/14 | 0.9; 0 | 1.6; 0 | 11.5 |
| Opina/Cadena SER | 9 Feb 2009 | ? | ? | 44.2; 34/36 | 34.0; 25/27 | 17.9; 14 | – | – | 10.2 |
| Obradoiro de Socioloxía/El Progreso | 8 Feb 2009 | ? | ? | 43.2; 35 | 32.5; 26 | 19.0; 14 | – | – | 10.7 |
| Quadernas Consultoría/Xornal (Note: "El PP sigue aún lejos de la mayoría, el paro castiga al PSOE y el BNG avanza". Xornal de Galicia (in Spanish). 8 February 2009.) | 30 Jan–5 Feb 2009 | ? | ? | 43.2; 34/35 | 31.7; 24/25 | 21.6; 16 | – | – | 11.5 |
| Obradoiro de Socioloxía/Público (Note: "El bipartito revalida su mayoría en Galicia". Público (in Spanish). 2 February 2009. Archived from the original on 3 February 2009.) | 2 Feb 2009 | ? | ? | 43.6; 35/36 | 32.6; 25/26 | 19.5; 14 | – | – | 11.0 |
| CIS | 15 Jan–2 Feb 2009 | 2,999 | ? | 43.1; 35/36 | 33.2; 27 | 18.3; 12/13 | 1.5; 0 | 1.5; 0 | 9.9 |
| Infortécnica/La Región (Note: "El electorado mantiene la incógnita entre la mayoría absoluta del PP y un nuevo bipartito". La Región (in Spanish). 1 February 2009.) | 1 Feb 2009 | ? | ? | ? 37/38 | ? 25/26 | ? 11/13 | – | – | ? |
| Sondaxe/La Voz de Galicia (Note: "Más de la cuarta parte de los electores aún no han decidido a quién votarán el 1-M". La Voz de Galicia (in Spanish). 25 January 2009. Archived from the original on 30 January 2009.) | 12–19 Jan 2009 | 1,700 | 66.1 | 42.8; 35 | 31.7; 26 | 18.5; 14 | – | – | 10.1 |
| TNS Demoscopia/Antena 3 (Note: "El PP volvería a ser el partido más votado en las elecciones gallegas". Antena 3 (in Spanish). 22 January 2009.) | 15–18 Jan 2009 | ? | 63.1 | 41.2; 35/36 | 34.9; 26/27 | 19.4; 13 | – | – | 6.3 |
| NC Report/La Razón (Note: "El PP no consigue la mayoría para recuperar la Xunta de Galicia". La Razón (in Spanish). 18 January 2009. Archived from the original on 11 December 2009.) | 12–16 Jan 2009 | 1,000 | 60.9 | 44.4; 35/37 | 32.0; 24/25 | 20.1; 14/15 | 0.9; 0 | 1.5; 0 | 12.4 |
| Quadernas Consultoría/Xornal | 29 Dec–7 Jan 2009 | 1,600 | ? | 40.8; 33/34 | 34.3; 25/26 | 21.7; 16 | – | – | 6.5 |
| PSdeG (Note: "El PP está a tres diputados de la mayoría absoluta, a seis meses de las autonómicas". La Voz de Galicia (in Spanish). 14 September 2008. Archived from the original on 18 September 2008.) | 15 Sep 2008 | 3,400 | ? | ? 32 | ? 30 | ? 13 | – | – | ? |
| Sondaxe/La Voz de Galicia (Note: "El PP está a tres diputados de la mayoría absoluta, a seis meses de las autonómicas". La Voz de Galicia (in Spanish). 14 September 2008. Archived from the original on 18 September 2008.) | 2–10 Sep 2008 | 1,700 | 68.0 | 43.0; 35 | 30.8; 26 | 18.3; 14 | – | – | 12.2 |
| 2008 general election | 9 Mar 2008 | —N/a | 70.5 | 43.9 (35) | 40.6 (33) | 11.5 (7) | 1.4 (0) | 0.5 (0) | 3.3 |
| USC | 23 Nov–7 Dec 2006 | 2,000 | ? | 37.0; 29 | 39.0; 31 | 20.8; 15 | – | – | 2.0 |
| Opina/Cadena SER | 21–22 Jun 2006 | 1,000 | ? | 40.0 | 38.0 | 20.0 | 1.0 | – | 2.0 |
| 2005 regional election | 19 Jun 2005 | —N/a | 64.2 | 45.2; 37 | 33.2; 25 | 18.7; 13 | 0.7; 0 | – | 12.0 |

=== Voting preferences ===
The table below lists raw, unweighted voting preferences.

| Polling firm/Commissioner | Fieldwork date | Sample size | PP | PSdeG–PSOE | BNG | EU–IU | UPyD | Question | X mark | Lead |
|---|---|---|---|---|---|---|---|---|---|---|
| 2009 regional election (Note: Does not include non-resident citizens.) | 1 Mar 2009 | —N/a | 32.9 | 20.9 | 11.6 | 0.7 | 1.0 | —N/a | 29.5 | 12.0 |
| Infortécnica/La Región | 16–19 Feb 2009 | 2,006 | 22.6 | 20.3 | 13.9 | – | – | 27.4 | 13.4 | 2.3 |
| Metroscopia/El País | 12–16 Feb 2009 | 1,600 | 26.6 | 24.3 | 12.9 | – | – | 27.9 | | 2.3 |
| Infortécnica/La Región | 13 Feb 2009 | 1,953 | 21.2 | 20.0 | 13.7 | – | – | 30.9 | 11.8 | 1.2 |
| Quadernas Consultoría/Xornal | 30 Jan–5 Feb 2009 | ? | 24.3 | 29.5 | 18.5 | – | – | – | – | 5.2 |
| CIS | 15 Jan–2 Feb 2009 | 2,999 | 23.3 | 24.0 | 12.2 | 1.0 | 1.0 | 29.4 | 5.3 | 0.7 |
| Quadernas Consultoría/Xornal | 29 Dec–7 Jan 2009 | 1,600 | 24.8 | 29.7 | 17.7 | – | – | – | – | 4.9 |
| Obradoiro de Socioloxía | 12 Dec 2008 | 2,000 | 20.9 | 24.4 | 12.3 | – | – | – | – | 3.5 |
| Sondaxe/La Voz de Galicia | 2–10 Sep 2008 | 1,700 | 28.5 | 17.8 | 11.0 | – | – | – | – | 10.7 |
| Obradoiro de Socioloxía | 29 Jul 2008 | ? | 21.4 | 23.4 | 13.6 | – | – | – | – | 2.0 |
| 2008 general election | 9 Mar 2008 | —N/a | 33.4 | 29.6 | 9.1 | 1.1 | 0.4 | —N/a | 24.5 | 3.8 |
| Obradoiro de Socioloxía | 17 Oct 2007 | ? | 16.9 | 23.7 | 13.7 | – | – | 25.2 | – | 6.8 |
| Obradoiro de Socioloxía | 28 Jul 2007 | 2,000 | 18.2 | 27.0 | 15.8 | – | – | 28.1 | 8.6 | 8.8 |
| Obradoiro de Socioloxía | 4 Apr 2007 | 2,000 | 17.0 | 23.7 | 12.4 | – | – | – | – | 6.7 |
| Obradoiro de Socioloxía | 18 Jul 2006 | 2,001 | 18.1 | 25.3 | 13.0 | – | – | – | – | 7.2 |
| Sondaxe/La Voz de Galicia | 24 Jan–2 Feb 2006 | 1,200 | 20.3 | 24.7 | 11.0 | – | – | 33.8 | – | 4.4 |
| USC | 7–16 Dec 2005 | 2,000 | 23.9 | 28.2 | 17.0 | – | – | – | – | 4.3 |
| 2005 regional election | 19 Jun 2005 | —N/a | 30.5 | 22.0 | 13.3 | 0.5 | – | —N/a | 31.9 | 8.5 |

=== Victory preferences ===
The table below lists opinion polling on the victory preferences for each party in the event of a regional election taking place.

| Polling firm/Commissioner | Fieldwork date | Sample size | PP | PSdeG–PSOE | BNG | EU–IU | UPyD | Other/ None | Question | Lead |
|---|---|---|---|---|---|---|---|---|---|---|
| Metroscopia/El País | 12–16 Feb 2009 | 1,600 | 35.0 | 30.0 | 14.0 | 1.0 | 1.0 | 1.0 | 18.0 | 5.0 |
| Noxa/La Vanguardia | 10–16 Feb 2009 | 1,000 | 34.0 | 30.0 | 19.0 | 1.0 | 1.0 | 15.0 | | 4.0 |
| Opina/Cadena SER | 9 Feb 2009 | ? | 33.7 | 32.5 | 12.2 | 1.1 | – | 6.0 | 14.6 | 1.2 |
| CIS | 15 Jan–2 Feb 2009 | 2,999 | 27.7 | 29.5 | 13.6 | 0.9 | 0.9 | 1.7 | 25.7 | 1.8 |

=== Victory likelihood ===
The table below lists opinion polling on the perceived likelihood of victory for each party in the event of a regional election taking place.

| Polling firm/Commissioner | Fieldwork date | Sample size | PP | PSdeG–PSOE | BNG | EU–IU | UPyD | Other/ None | Question | Lead |
|---|---|---|---|---|---|---|---|---|---|---|
| Infortécnica/La Región | 16–19 Feb 2009 | 2,006 | 44.0 | 47.6 | 8.4 | – | – | – | – | 3.6 |
| Metroscopia/El País | 12–16 Feb 2009 | 1,600 | 46.0 | 39.0 | 2.0 | – | – | 2.0 | 13.0 | 7.0 |
| Infortécnica/La Región | 13 Feb 2009 | 1,953 | 46.8 | 46.6 | 6.6 | – | – | – | – | 0.2 |
| Opina/Cadena SER | 9 Feb 2009 | ? | 28.5 | 45.1 | 1.7 | 0.1 | – | 0.3 | 24.4 | 16.6 |
| CIS | 15 Jan–2 Feb 2009 | 2,999 | 25.2 | 40.3 | 3.1 | – | 0.0 | 0.1 | 31.2 | 15.1 |

=== Preferred President ===
The table below lists opinion polling on leader preferences to become president of the Regional Government of Galicia.

| Polling firm/Commissioner | Fieldwork date | Sample size | | | | Other/ None/ Not care | Question | Lead |
| Polling firm/Commissioner | Fieldwork date | Sample size | Feijóo PP | Touriño PSdeG | Quintana BNG | Other/ None/ Not care | Question | Lead |
|---|---|---|---|---|---|---|---|---|
| Obradoiro de Socioloxía/Público | 12–19 Feb 2009 | 2,411 | 26.4 | 24.4 | 13.0 | 36.2 | | 2.0 |
| Noxa/La Vanguardia | 10–16 Feb 2009 | 1,000 | 30.0 | 34.0 | 20.0 | 16.0 | | 4.0 |
| Opina/Cadena SER | 9 Feb 2009 | ? | 31.2 | 30.5 | 16.6 | 8.3 | 13.4 | 0.7 |
| Obradoiro de Socioloxía/Público | 2 Feb 2009 | ? | 24.7 | 30.4 | 15.6 | 29.3 | | 5.7 |
| CIS | 15 Jan–2 Feb 2009 | 2,999 | 23.9 | 29.8 | 14.3 | 10.6 | 21.5 | 5.9 |

=== Predicted President ===
The table below lists opinion polling on the perceived likelihood for each leader to become president of the Regional Government of Galicia.

| Polling firm/Commissioner | Fieldwork date | Sample size | | | | Other/ None/ Not care | Question | Lead |
| Polling firm/Commissioner | Fieldwork date | Sample size | Feijóo PP | Touriño PSdeG | Quintana BNG | Other/ None/ Not care | Question | Lead |
|---|---|---|---|---|---|---|---|---|
| Infortécnica/La Región | 16–19 Feb 2009 | 2,006 | 31.3 | 64.0 | 4.7 | – | – | 32.7 |
| Obradoiro de Socioloxía/Público | 12–19 Feb 2009 | 2,411 | 12.9 | 49.1 | 2.4 | 35.6 | | 36.2 |
| Infortécnica/La Región | 13 Feb 2009 | 1,953 | 24.6 | 68.5 | 6.9 | – | – | 43.9 |
| Opina/Cadena SER | 9 Feb 2009 | ? | 14.0 | 60.9 | 5.6 | 0.3 | 19.2 | 46.9 |
| Obradoiro de Socioloxía/Público | 2 Feb 2009 | ? | 14.8 | 52.3 | 3.2 | 29.7 | | 37.5 |

== Results ==
=== Overall ===
← Summary of the 1 March 2009 Parliament of Galicia election results →
| Parties and alliances | Popular vote | | | Seats | |
| Parties and alliances | Votes | % | ±pp | Total | +/− |
|---|---|---|---|---|---|
| People's Party (PP) | 789,427 | 46.68 | +1.45 | 38 | +1 |
| Socialists' Party of Galicia (PSdeG–PSOE) | 524,488 | 31.02 | −2.20 | 25 | ±0 |
| Galician Nationalist Bloc (BNG) | 270,712 | 16.01 | −2.64 | 12 | −1 |
| Union, Progress and Democracy (UPyD) | 23,796 | 1.41 | New | 0 | ±0 |
| Galician Land (TeGa) | 18,726 | 1.11 | New | 0 | ±0 |
| United Left (EU–IU) | 16,441 | 0.97 | +0.23 | 0 | ±0 |
| The Greens–Green Group (OV–GV) | 5,911 | 0.35 | New | 0 | ±0 |
| For a Fairer World (PUM+J) | 3,507 | 0.21 | New | 0 | ±0 |
| Galician People's Front (FPG) | 2,903 | 0.17 | −0.01 | 0 | ±0 |
| We–People's Unity (Nós–UP) | 1,510 | 0.09 | −0.01 | 0 | ±0 |
| Humanist Party (PH) | 1,227 | 0.07 | −0.02 | 0 | ±0 |
| Ourensan Democracy (DO) | 1,066 | 0.06 | +0.02 | 0 | ±0 |
| More Galicia (+G) | 923 | 0.05 | New | 0 | ±0 |
| Spanish Phalanx of the CNSO (FE–JONS) | 675 | 0.04 | −0.02 | 0 | ±0 |
| Internationalist Solidarity and Self-Management (SAIn) | 420 | 0.02 | New | 0 | ±0 |
| United Galicia (GU) | 369 | 0.02 | New | 0 | ±0 |
| Liberal Centrist Union (UCL) | 311 | 0.02 | New | 0 | ±0 |
| Social Democratic Party of Law (SDD) | 262 | 0.02 | +0.01 | 0 | ±0 |
| Electronic Voting Assembly (AVE) | 230 | 0.01 | New | 0 | ±0 |
| Blank ballots | 28,071 | 1.66 | +0.41 | | |
| Total | 1,690,975 | | | 75 | ±0 |
| Valid votes | 1,690,975 | 99.11 | −0.43 | | |
| Invalid votes | 15,223 | 0.89 | +0.43 | | |
| Votes cast / turnout | 1,706,198 | 64.43 | +0.22 | | |
| Abstentions | 942,078 | 35.57 | −0.22 | | |
| Registered voters | 2,648,276 | | | | |

Popular vote
| PP | 46.68% |
| PSdeG–PSOE | 31.02% |
| BNG | 16.01% |
| UPyD | 1.41% |
| TeGa | 1.11% |
| Others | 2.11% |
| Blank ballots | 1.66% |

Seats
| PP | 50.67% |
| PSdeG–PSOE | 33.33% |
| BNG | 16.00% |

=== Distribution by constituency ===
| Constituency | PP | | PSdeG | | BNG | |
| Constituency | % | S | % | S | % | S |
|---|---|---|---|---|---|---|
| A Coruña | 45.5 | 12 | 30.6 | 8 | 15.7 | 4 |
| Lugo | 47.8 | 8 | 32.7 | 5 | 14.6 | 2 |
| Ourense | 48.5 | 7 | 31.9 | 5 | 16.0 | 2 |
| Pontevedra | 46.9 | 11 | 30.5 | 7 | 16.9 | 4 |
| Total | 46.7 | 38 | 31.0 | 25 | 16.0 | 12 |

== Aftermath ==
=== Government formation ===
Investiture; Nomination of Alberto Núñez Feijóo (PP)
| Ballot → | 16 April 2009 |
| Required majority → | 38 out of 75 |
| Yes: • PP (38) | 38 / 75 |
| No: • PSdeG (24); • BNG (12) | 36 / 75 |
| Abstentions | 0 / 75 |
| Absentees: • PSdeG (1) | 1 / 75 |

== Bibliography ==
- Ley Orgánica 1/1981, de 6 de abril, de Estatuto de Autonomía para Galicia (Organic Law 1/1981). Official State Gazette (in Spanish). 6 April 1981 [version as of 2 July 2002]. BOE-A-1981-9564.
- Ley 1/1983, de 22 de febrero, reguladora de la Junta y su Presidente (Law 1/1983). Official State Gazette (in Spanish). 22 February 1983 [version as of 8 August 2007]. BOE-A-1983-23788.
- Ley Orgánica 5/1985, de 19 de junio, del Régimen Electoral General (Organic Law 5/1985). Official State Gazette (in Spanish). 19 June 1985 [version as of 22 January 2009]. BOE-A-1985-11672.
- Ley 8/1985, de 13 de agosto, de elecciones al Parlamento de Galicia (Law 8/1985). Official State Gazette (in Spanish). 13 August 1985 [version as of 16 December 2004]. BOE-A-1985-21380.
- Decreto 1/2009, de 5 de enero, de disolución del Parlamento de Galicia y de convocatoria de elecciones (PDF) (Decree 1/2009). Official Journal of Galicia (in Spanish). 5 January 2009.
