= Galician Nationalist Bloc =

Galician Nationalist Bloc Bloque Nacionalista Galego
- Abbreviation: BNG
- Spokesperson: Ana Pontón
- Founded: 1982
- Merger of: Galician People's Union; Galician National-Popular Assembly; Galician Socialist Party; Independents
- Headquarters: Av. de Rodríguez de Viguri, 16, 15703, Santiago de Compostela
- Newspaper: Benegá ao día
- Student wing: Erguer-Estudantes da Galiza
- Youth wing: Galiza Nova
- Membership (2019): ▲7,800
- Ideology: Galician nationalism; Socialism; Left-wing nationalism; Eco-nationalism; Republicanism; Euroscepticism; Faction: Galician independence
- Political position: Left-wing
- National affiliation: Ahora Repúblicas (since 2019); LPD (2014–2019); EdP–V (2009–2014); GalEusCa (2004–2009)
- Regional affiliation: We–Galician Candidacy (2015–2016)
- European affiliation: European Free Alliance
- European Parliament group: Greens–European Free Alliance
- Trade union affiliation: Confederación Intersindical Galega (CIG)
- Colors: Sky blue
- Congress of Deputies (Galician seats): 1 / 23
- Senate of Spain (Galician seats): 1 / 18
- European Parliament (Spanish seats): 1 / 61 (Ahora Repúblicas)
- Parliament of Galicia: 25 / 75
- Provincial deputations: 11 / 108
- Mayors in Galicia: 36 / 313
- Town Councillors in Galicia: 590 / 3,721

Website
- bng.gal

The Galician Nationalist Bloc (Galician: Bloque Nacionalista Galego [beˈneˈɣa], BNG) is a political party and coalition from Galicia, formed through the alliance of a series of left-wing Galician nationalist parties. It is self-defined as a "patriotic front".

Founded in 1982 under the guidance of historical leader Xosé Manuel Beiras, the BNG calls for further devolution of powers to the Parliament of Galicia and the official and unambiguous recognition of Galicia as a nation. (Note: In reference to the fact that the Statute of Autonomy of Galicia of 1981 states that Galicia is a "historical nationality", rather than simply a nation.) The BNG also promotes affirmative action for the Galician language. The current leader—the president of the National Council and national spokesperson—is Ana Pontón.

The BNG has strong ties with the Galician Trade Union Confederation (Confederación Intersindical Galega, CIG), with the student union Erguer-Estudantes da Galiza (Stand Up–Students of Galiza), the agrarian unions Galician Peasant Union (Sindicato Labrego Galego, SLG) and Galician Rural Federation (FRUGA), and with environmentalist, feminist and Galician language organizations.

From 2005 to 2009, BNG was part of a coalition government along with the Socialists' Party of Galicia, in which its leader, Anxo Quintana, served as the vice-president of the Regional Government of Galicia.

== History ==
=== Origins and formation ===
The Galician People's Union (UPG) and the Galician Socialist Party (PSG), left-wing Galician nationalist parties, were founded in the early 1960s by anti-Francoist activists. In 1975 the Galician National-Popular Assembly (AN-PG) was founded, as a "mass front" of the UPG to organize protests and prepare a future electoral candidacy. In 1977 the UPG and the AN-PG created the Galician National-Popular Bloc (BN-PG), that run for the first democratic elections since 1936.

In October 1981, the first elections for the Parliament of Galicia were held. These elections were won by the conservative and Spanish People's Alliance, while the Galician nationalist parties had a relatively low electoral result. (Note: The coalition between the BN-PG and the PSG won 3 seats and the 6.3% of the vote. Galician Left gained one seat and the 3.4% of the vote. The Galicianist Party won the 3.31 of the vote and no seats. Galiza Ceibe-OLN only gained the 0.15% of the vote, despite having unha candidacy in the province of Pontevedra with the objective of gaining free electoral propaganda space to broadcast a message of support for the independentist prisoners, advocated a boycott of the elections. In total, Galician nationalist lists gained 4 seats (out of 71) and the 13,16% of the vote) The three MPs of the joint BN-PG and PSG list were expelled from Parliament after they refused to take the oath to the Spanish constitution.

The UPG and the AN-PG agreed in early 1982 to reformulate their project, in the form a left-wing nationalist front that would cover a greater political spectrum, with different currents and parties inside it. The first meeting was held on 15 May, with the participation of AN-PG, UPG, PSG, Galiza Ceibe-OLN, Assembly of Galician Nationalists, Libertarian Collective "Arco da Vella" (Note: "Rainbow" in Galician) and independents of Santiago de Compostela and A Coruña. All these organizations and independents had signed an appeal for the unity of Galician nationalism; under the basic principles of recognition of the multinational character of the Spanish State, right of self-determination, anti-imperialism, self-governance, self-organization, internal pluralism and democracy. This meeting would lead to the establishment of a Permanent National Managing Commission, with 22 members. In addition to the previous groups, Galician Revolutionary Students (ERGA), Nationalist Advance and independents of Vigo and O Condado would also join the new project.

In spite of the unity, there were great ideological and tactical differences between the different parties. PSG gave great importance to the unity of nationalist trade-unionism and to participating in the institutions. on the other hand, Galiza Ceibe-OLN defended an active boycott of all the elections and a full rupture with the constitutional system. Nationalist Advance defended that the new organization should reject all laws and seek full national independence. At a meeting held on 27 June the political program of the organization was approved, without explicitly mentioning independence, although the creation of a Galician state was considered the main final goal. The new organization also wanted to balance institutional presence and social mobilization, to better defend the "popular and national interests". In subsequent meetings, local and regional assemblies were established. Those assemblies discussed the document adopted before the celebration of the founding Assembly. On 11 July, the Assembly of Galician Nationalists (ANG) decided to leave the Permanent Managing Commission, on the grounds that the new front was at the service of the individual parties and lacked a serious minimum political program. Despite this, ANG members continued to work individually on the creation of the new front.

=== 1st National Assembly (1982–1984) ===
On 25 and 26 September 1982, the founding assembly took place on the Fronton Municipal of Riazor, A Coruña. This new force was defined as "interclassist", seeking to defend all the Galician "popular classes". The Estreleira was chosen as the official flag, and (after a very close voting) "Galician Nationalist Bloc" was chosen as the new name. This assembly also approved the five basic principles of BNG:
1. Galiza [Galicia], as a nation, has the rights of self-determination and of exercising its national sovereignty.
2. Defense of democracy and popular interests.
3. The need for political and social self-organization, and non-dependency in the relations of Galiza.
4. Solidarity, anti-imperialism, peace and international disarmament.
5. A social model that promotes the socioeconomic development without dependence and on behalf of the welfare of the whole people.

Finally, AN-PG (which will cease to exist de facto after this Assembly), UPG, PSG and various independents joined the front. Galiza Ceibe-OLN decide to leave after the Assembly decided that to participate in all elections, while the Libertarian Collective "Arco da Vella" also left due to their disagreement with the name and part of the political line.

In the general elections of 1982, the BNG (still a coalition between the BN-PG and the PSG, since the new front had not yet been registered) gained 38,522 votes and no seats. These election results generated an internal debate within the PSG, which lead to an extraordinary Congress in January 1983, in which the party decided to leave the BNG. Despite this, a large group of members of the PSG split and continued to work inside the BNG with the name Socialist Collective (CS). In 1984 the PSG merged with Galician Left (EG), to create a new party: Galician Socialist Party–Galician Left (PSG-EG). The National Day of Galicia of 1983, the BNG called for a demonstration in Santiago de Compostela, attended by between 7,000 (according to the Spanish Police) and 15,000 (according to the BNG) people, with the main slogans of "Nationalism: the solution for Galicia" and "Unity in the Anti-imperialist Struggle" (Note: Several representatives of international organizations also attended the protest, including: Herri Batasuna, Palestine Liberation Organization, Farabundo Martí National Liberation Front, Organization of People in Arms, Revolutionary Left Movement, Partido por la Victoria del Pueblo and Lebanese National Resistance Front.). The demonstration was dissolved by the police, leaving various protesters injured.

Local elections were held in April of the same year (1983), being the first ones to be run by the BNG. The front obtained 50,491 votes, 117 local councilors and 6 mayors (Corcubión, Fene, Moaña, Malpica de Bergantiños and Carnota).

=== 2nd National Assembly (1984–1986) ===
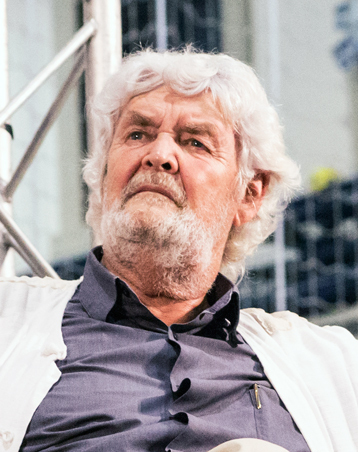
Xosé Manuel Beiras was the spokesperson of the front from 1985 to 2002. Between 1985 and 1989 he was also the only MP of the BNG in the parliament of Galicia.

The II National Assembly took place in December 1984 in Santiago de Compostela. This assembly defined the political position of the BNG in fundamental aspects of its political project, such as environmentalism, feminism, education, Galician language or Galician culture.

Throughout that year, BNG developed an enormous political activity against the deindustrialization caused by the policy of "restructuring", actively participating in the three general strikes that took place in Galicia that year. The front also developed actions of protest against what was considered the appropriation and manipulation of the remains of historic Galician nationalist Alfonso Daniel Rodríguez Castelao, receiving in response a tough police crackdown. Defending the memory of the nationalist politician and intellectual was the main reason for the National Day of Galicia of that year, gaining (for the first time in many years) a permit to enter the historic center of Santiago de Compostela.

In the Galician elections of 1985, the front only gained one seat (occupied by Xosé Manuel Beiras). This time, the MP was allowed to take the seat in exchange for "promising" to comply with the constitution (but not taking the Oath).

=== Extraordinary National Assembly (1985–1987) ===
The bad electoral results culminated in an internal debate which ended with the convening of an extraordinary National Assembly, held at Santiago on 15 December. BNG ratified its political tactic of accepting the Parliamentary requirement of accepting the constitution. This led to some new internal tensions, particularly inside the UPG. In 1986 these tensions culminated in a split in the UPG, with the more radical sector forming a new political group: Collective 22 March. This collective would create a new organization in July, the Communist Party of National Liberation (PCLN), an independentist and communist party. The PCLN would remain within the BNG, despite not agreeing with its new political line.

The same year (1986) the Spanish NATO membership referendum took place, and the Galician Nationalist Bloc campaigned in favor of leaving. Remaining would have won in Spain and in Galicia. In the Spanish elections of 1986 BNG gained 27,049 votes (2.11 of the Galician vote) and no seats. The same year, the party boycotted the official acts of remembrance of the 1936 statute of autonomy, demanding self-determination and an end to "historical manipulation". The BNG also campaigned against the entry of Galicia in the European Economic Community.

=== 3rd National Assembly (1987–1989) ===
On 7 and 8 February 1987 the III National Assembly took place at O Carballiño. Party members approved the mechanisms that allowed the "updating" of the tactics and forms of political work of the front, by starting the process of opening the BNG to Galician society. The party also chose a new corporate image.

The party tried to form a unitary Galician nationalist candidacy to the European elections of that year, but the talks failed. BNG then rejected a coalition offer made by Herri Batasuna, and decided to run alone, gaining 53,116 votes. The PCLN was expelled from the BNG for supporting Herri Batasuna in the election campaign, instead of its own list. After their expulsion, PCLN would create (along with Galiza Ceibe-OLN and local groups) the Galician People's Front (FPG).

Later, on the same year, local elections were held, with the front obtaining 61,256 votes, 139 local councilors and 7 mayors (Corcubión, Carnota, Noia, Ares, Fene, Ribadeo and Malpica de Bergantiños).

In July 1988, Galiza Nova, a new youth organization, is founded, fully becoming part of the BNG. Galiza Nova replaced Galician Revolutionary Students (ERGA) as its youth-wing. The front celebrated the National Day of Galicia of that year with a demonstration (attended by 10,000 people) with the slogan "Common project", that wanted to summarize the renewed political line of the 3rd National Assembly. Due to the wave of forest fires that inundated Galicia that year, the BNG boosted, along with several environmentalist associations and groups, the first popular legislative initiative in Galicia, in order to defend the Galician forests.

=== 4th National Assembly (1987–1989) ===
The 4th National Assembly of the organization took place in February 1989 in Lugo. The discussions focused on setting a political strategy to answer the economic crisis that was affecting Galicia at the time. Xosé Manuel Beiras was elected as the candidate for the presidency of Galicia. In the Galician elections of 1989 BNG gained 105,703 votes and 5 MPs. The Galician Nationalist Party–Galicianist Party (PNG-PG) and FPG failed in their attempt to get representation. Galician Socialist Party–Galician Left (PSG-EG) obtained two seats. In June of the same year, the second European elections in the history of Spain were held, with the BNG running alone again, as the only Galician candidacy, and gaining 46,052 votes. In October, general elections were held, with the BNG gaining 47,763 and failing to win any seat again. In 1989, there was a popular movement of protest in the town of Allariz, against the mayor Leopoldo Pérez Camba (People's Party), which evolved into a full revolt and ended with the resignation of the local government. After the resignation, Anxo Quintana, a BNG local councilor, was elected as the mayor of the town. Since then, Allariz has been the main stronghold of the BNG (which has won all local elections since 1993 with more than the 60% of the vote).

In June 1990, the Permanent Commission made public an economic document, with an analysis on the crisis of Galicia and the solutions to it proposed by the front. In July, the BNG held a common march in Santiago de Compostela with the PNG-PG.

=== 5th National Assembly (1991–1993) ===
In January 1991, the V National Assembly was held in Vigo. Galiza Nova was fully integrated into the structures of the front. BNG developed an intense campaign that year with the slogan "Galiza self-determination", which culminated on 6 December with a rally in Santiago de Compostela attended by more than 10,000 people. Later on that same year, Inzar and PNG-PG joined BNG.

==== Local elections of 1991 ====
In May 1991, local elections were held. BNG ran in 162 municipalities (out of 311), getting 107,932 votes, 8 mayors (Allariz, Malpica de Bergantiños, Noia, Corcubión, Vilar de Santos, Ribadeo, Fene, and Carnota) and 241 town councilors.

In 1992, the front supported and actively participated in the national general strike on 2 April. During that year, the front also campaigned against the Maastricht Treaty and a group of independents within BNG created the collective Nationalist Left (IN), in an attempt to gain internal power and to lower the influence of the Galician People's Union.

=== 6th National Assembly (1993–1995) ===
The 6th National Assembly was held in March 1993 at A Coruña, with no relevant changes. BNG run for the Spanish elections of 1993 with the slogan "Galiza with its own strength", obtaining 126,965 votes and getting very close to gaining seats at A Coruña and Pontevedra. Later in the same year, BNG participated in an international conference in Denmark of parties and individuals that opposed the Maastricht Treaty.

In the Galician elections of October, the front gained 269,233 votes and 13 seats. Galician Unity, the old PSG-EG, would also join BNG after his electoral failures of that year. In the European elections of 1994 the front won a record 139,221 votes, but failed again to gain any seats. This positive electoral trend would continue in the local elections of 1995, in which the Bloc obtained 208,098 votes, 428 local councillors and 12 mayors (Allariz, Vilar de Santos, Fene, Corcubión, As Pontes de García Rodríguez, Cangas do Morrazo, Noia, Vilariño de Conso, Moaña, Bueu, Poio and Rairiz de Veiga)

The increasing unity of Galician nationalism in the political arena also had consequences in other sectors. One of those sectors were unionism, where the old unions National Inter-Union of the Galician Workers (INTG) (aligned with the Galician People's Union-BNG) and General Confederation of Galician Workers (CXTG) (aligned with PSG-EG) merged to create Confederación Intersindical Galega (CIG).

=== 2012 split ===
In 2012, several parties and individuals abandoned the front, dissatisfied with its political line and the control exercised by the UPG. Encontro Irmandiño abandoned the bloc and joined with Galician Workers' Front (Fronte Obreira Galega), the Galician People's Front (FPG), Movemento pola Base and other collectives to form Anova-Nationalist Brotherhood. Anova obtained four seats in the 2012 Galician election as part of the Galician Left Alternative coalition. Anova is a pro-independence, anti-capitalist, anti-globalization, republican and anti-imperialist organization. Other groups that split were the more moderate social-democratic and autonomist Máis Galiza, Nationalist Left and the Galician Nationalist Party–Galicianist Party (PNG-PG). They formed Commitment to Galicia (CxG), a social-democratic and autonomist organization. No CxG deputies were elected at the 2012 Galician election.

=== Since 2016 ===
In 2016, as part of a self-proclaimed "refoundation" of the party, Ana Pontón was elected national spokesperson. This marked the first time a woman held such a prominent position within the party. She also serves as the party's candidate as the party's candidate for President of the Xunta de Galicia in the 2016, 2020, and 2024 regional elections. In each of these elections, the BNG achieved better results than in the previous one, ultimately reaching a historic total of 25 seats, a significant milestone for Galician nationalism. Ana Pontón has been recognized as a leader who blends nationalism with social issues, practicing an inclusive and moderate leadership style.

== Ideology ==
The BNG is composed of a majority of grassroots independent members and a number of political parties. Traditionally, the largest party and main ideological influence has been the Galician People's Union (Unión do Povo Galego, UPG).

In origin, the UPG, and consequently the BNG, were strongly left-wing and supported the idea of Galician independence. However, since 1990 BNG had gradually abandoned talk about independence and self-determination, especially since the moderate nationalist party Galician Unity (Unidade Galega) joined the coalition. According to its former leader, Anxo Quintana, BNG at that time was not a pro-independence party, although some individuals and organizations within it continued to express a support for the idea.

Nonetheless, the hegemonic UPG has supported independence again since 2011 while preserving its left-wing core. Following the National Assembly of Amio (2012), the whole front readopted the idea of independence and the creation of a Galician republic. That same year, the BNG adopted a critical position towards the European Union.

The BNG supports Palestine within the context of Israeli–Palestinian conflict. They have been supportive of BDS measures against Israel and have hosted events, featuring the anti-Zionist group, PFLP, that has been designated as a terrorist organization by Israel, the European Union, the United States, Canada, and Japan.

== Organization ==
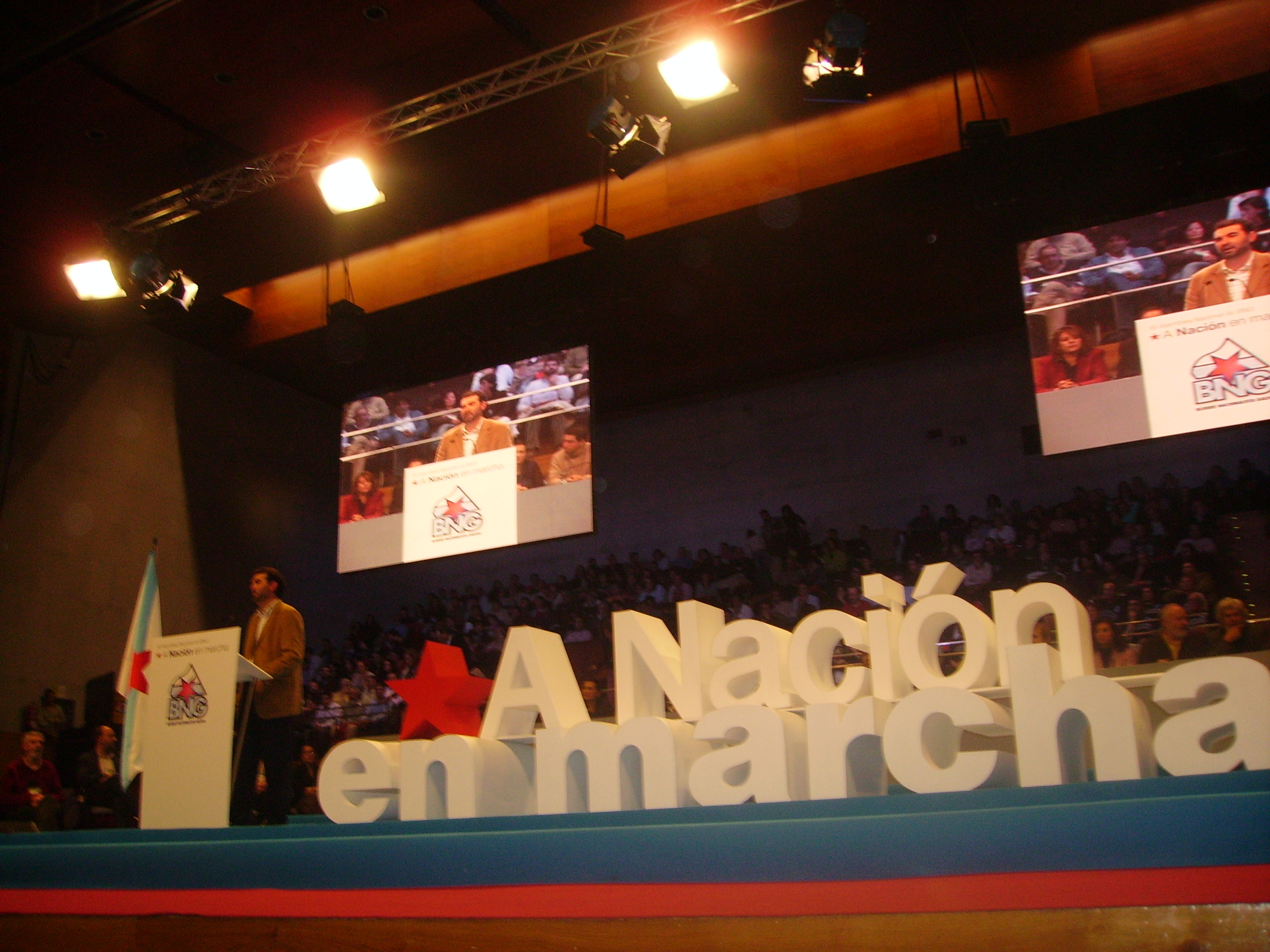
Anxo Quintana speaking at the 2006 National Assembly

=== Structure ===
The BNG regulates itself through local, regional and national assemblies in which members can vote for and be elected as regional delegates and thereafter members of the National Council. However, the internal functioning of the party has come into criticism in recent years. As a result, several new organizations calling for "transparency and internal democracy" have formed within the BNG, namely the Encontro Irmandinho (led by former BNG president Xosé Manuel Beiras), Movemento Pola Base (formed by grassroots members and backed by the youth section Galiza Nova), and A Alternativa (supported by former Member of the European Parliament Camilo Nogueira). Furthermore, Anxo Quintana's leadership has been called into question after the poor results of the Galician 2009 elections.

=== Composition ===
Joint affiliation with other political groups outside the BNG is not allowed. The political groups currently recognised by the BNG (via a lengthy ratification process) are:

| Name | Acronym | Ideology | Joined in | Details |
|---|---|---|---|---|
| Galician People's Union | UPG | Communism, Marxism–Leninism, Galician independence | 1981 | |
| Abrente–Galician Democratic Left | Abrente–EDG | Social democracy, Federalism | 2012 | |
| Galician Movement for Socialism | MGS | Galician independence, Revolutionary socialism | 2009 | |
| Galician Workers' Front | FOGA | Anti-capitalism, Galician independence | 2017 | Left the front in 2012 to join Anova-Nationalist Brotherhood, left Anova in 2014 and rejoined the BNG in January 2017. |

Historical parties and currents:

| Name | Acronym | Ideology | Joined/Left | Details |
|---|---|---|---|---|
| Galician Socialist Party | PSG | Democratic socialism, Marxism, Federalism | 1982–1983 | Split in two in 1983, a sector joined Galician Left and formed the PSG–EG, other continued to work in the BNG as the Socialist Collective. |
| Socialist Collective | CS | Democratic socialism, Marxism, Federalism | 1983–2012 | Split of the Galician Socialist Party. |
| Communist Party of National Liberation | PCLN | Marxism–Leninism, Galician independence, Communism | 1986–1987 | Split of the Galician People's Union, left the BNG in 1987 to form the Galician People's Front. |
| Galician Nationalist Party–Galicianist Party | PNG–PG | Social liberalism, Federalism | 1991–2012 | Left the BNG in 2012 to join Commitment to Galicia (CxG). |
| Nationalist Left | EN | Democratic socialism, Galician independence | 1992–2012 | Dissolved in 2012 to join Máis Galiza |
| Inzar | INZAR | Anti-capitalism, Feminism, Ecologism. | 1993–2012 | Dissolved in 2012. |
| Galician Unity | UG | Democratic socialism, Federalism, Ecologism | 1994–2003 | Dissolved in 2003. |
| Primeira Linha | PL | Revolutionary socialism, Galician independence, Marxism–Leninism | 1998–1999 | Left the 1999, later formed Nós–Unidade Popular. |
| Movemento pola Base | MpB | Communism, Galician independence | 2005–2009 | Split from the Galician People's Union, left the BNG in 2009, joined Anova-Nationalist Brotherhood in 2012. |
| Encontro Irmandiño | EI | Socialism, Alter-globalization, Feminism, Direct democracy | 2007–2012 | Left the BNG in 2012 to form Anova-Nationalist Brotherhood. |
| Galician Socialist Space | ESG | Social democracy, Europeanism, Federalism | 2008–2012 | Split from Nationalist Left, joined Máis Galiza in 2009. Left the BNG in 2012 to join Commitment to Galicia (CxG). |
| Máis Galiza | MG or +Gz | Social democracy, Europeanism, Federalism | 2009–2012 | Left the BNG in 2012 to join Commitment to Galicia (CxG). |

=== Leadership ===
| National spokesperson | | Time in office |
|---|---|---|
| 1. | Xosé Manuel Beiras | 1995 – 2003 |
| 2. | Anxo Quintana | 2003 – 2009 |
| 3. | Guillerme Vázquez | 2009 – 2012 |
| 4. | Xavier Vence | 2012 – 2016 |
| 5. | Ana Pontón | 2016 – present |

=== Alliances ===
The BNG has taken part in several alliances with other parties in Spain to have its interests represented in the European Parliament. These alliances are usually established with other regionalist and separatist parties such as the Basque Nationalist Party and the Catalan Convergence and Union. Currently, the BNG is part of the Ahora Repúblicas coalition, which also includes the Basque EH Bildu and the Republican Left of Catalonia.

=== International affiliation and relations ===
In the European Parliament, the BNG is a member of the Greens–European Free Alliance group.

== Electoral performance ==
BNG began its electoral history in a modest way. However, it quickly progressed from a single seat in the parliament of Galicia to its second best result in 1997 when, under the leadership of Xosé Manuel Beiras, it won almost 25 per cent of the total vote and 18 seats (out of 75) at the Parliament.

After the 2001 Galician elections, the BNG still was the second-largest political group in the Galician Parliament with 17 seats, slightly ahead of the Socialists' Party of Galicia (PSdG) in total votes. Yet it was not until 2005 that BNG could force a coalition government, despite losing four seats and slipping to the third place. The BNG vice-president Anxo Quintana became then the vice-president of Galicia, and BNG could directly appoint a number of conselleiros (ministers) for some government departments. Prior to that, the other major Galician party, the conservative People's Party (PPdeG), had remained in control of the overall majority and therefore of the Galician government. In the 2009 elections, a sharp reduction in votes for the PSdG, together with poor results for the BNG (12 seats), forced the left-wing coalition out of government to the benefit of the PPdeG.

Meanwhile, the BNG won 208,688 votes (11.37 per cent of the Galician vote, 0.8 of the Spanish total) in the 2004 Spanish general election, gaining two of the 350 seats in the Congress of Deputies. Results in the 2008 Spanish general election were slightly improved (+0.7% in Galicia), although resulting in the same number of seats. Results in local elections have traditionally been good, with a constant increase in the number of seats won, allowing BNG to govern or to, at least, take part in the government coalitions of most Galician large urban centres.

=== Parliament of Galicia ===
| Election | Leading candidate | Votes | % | Seats | +/– | Government |
|---|---|---|---|---|---|---|
| 1985 | Xosé Manuel Beiras | 53,072 | 4.20 (#5) | 1 / 75 | 2 (Note: Compared to Galician National-Popular Bloc–Galician Socialist Party totals in the 1981 regional election.) | Opposition |
| 1989 | Xosé Manuel Beiras | 105,703 | 7.97 (#3) | 5 / 75 | 4 | Opposition |
| 1993 | Xosé Manuel Beiras | 269,233 | 18.38 (#3) | 13 / 75 | 8 | Opposition |
| 1997 | Xosé Manuel Beiras | 395,435 | 24.78 (#2) | 18 / 75 | 5 | Opposition |
| 2001 | Xosé Manuel Beiras | 346,430 | 22.58 (#2) | 17 / 75 | 1 | Opposition |
| 2005 | Anxo Quintana | 311,954 | 18.65 (#3) | 13 / 75 | 4 | Coalition |
| 2009 | Anxo Quintana | 270,712 | 16.01 (#3) | 12 / 75 | 1 | Opposition |
| 2012 | Francisco Jorquera | 146,027 | 10.11 (#4) | 7 / 75 | 5 | Opposition |
| 2016 | Ana Pontón | 119,446 | 8.33 (#4) | 6 / 75 | 1 | Opposition |
| 2020 | Ana Pontón | 311,340 | 23.79 (#2) | 19 / 75 | 13 | Opposition |
| 2024 | Ana Pontón | 467,074 | 31.58 (#2) | 25 / 75 | 6 | Opposition |

=== Cortes Generales ===
==== Nationwide ====
| Election | Leading candidate | Congress | | | | | Senate | | Status in legislature |
| Election | Leading candidate | Votes | % | # | Seats | +/– | Seats | +/– | Status in legislature |
|---|---|---|---|---|---|---|---|---|---|
| 1986 | — | 27,049 | 0.13% | 26th | 0 / 350 | 0 (Note: Compared to Galician Nationalist Bloc–Galician Socialist Party totals in the 1982 general election.) | 0 / 208 | 0 | No seats |
| 1989 | Jose Enrique Tello | 47,763 | 0.23% | 21st | 0 / 350 | 0 | 0 / 208 | 0 | No seats |
| 1993 | Francisco Rodríguez | 126,965 | 0.54% | 13th | 0 / 350 | 0 | 0 / 208 | 0 | No seats |
| 1996 | Francisco Rodríguez | 220,147 | 0.88% | 7th | 2 / 350 | 2 | 0 / 208 | 0 | Opposition |
| 2000 | Francisco Rodríguez | 306,268 | 1.32% | 6th | 3 / 350 | 1 | 0 / 208 | 0 | Opposition |
| 2004 | Francisco Rodríguez | 208,688 | 0.81% | 8th | 2 / 350 | 1 | 0 / 208 | 0 | Opposition |
| 2008 | Francisco Jorquera | 212,543 | 0.83% | 8th | 2 / 350 | 0 | 0 / 208 | 0 | Opposition |
| 2011 | Francisco Jorquera | 184,037 | 0.76% | 10th | 2 / 350 | 0 | 0 / 208 | 0 | Opposition |
| 2015 | Carlos Callón | Within Nós | | | 0 / 350 | 2 | 0 / 208 | 0 | No seats |
| 2016 | Luis Bará | 45,252 | 0.19% | 14th | 0 / 350 | 0 | 0 / 208 | 0 | No seats |
| 2019 (Apr) | Néstor Rego | 94,433 | 0.36% | 15th | 0 / 350 | 0 | 0 / 208 | 0 | No seats |
| 2019 (Nov) | Néstor Rego | 120,456 | 0.50% | 14th | 1 / 350 | 1 | 0 / 208 | 0 | Opposition |
| 2023 | Néstor Rego | 152,327 | 0.62% | 9th | 1 / 350 | 0 | 0 / 208 | 0 | Confidence and supply |

==== Regional breakdown ====
| Election | Galicia | | | | | | |
| Election | Congress | | | | | Senate | |
| Election | Votes | % | # | Seats | +/– | Seats | +/– |
|---|---|---|---|---|---|---|---|
| 1986 | 27,049 | 2.11% | 6th | 0 / 27 | 0 | 0 / 16 | 0 |
| 1989 | 47,763 | 3.59% | 4th | 0 / 27 | 0 | 0 / 16 | 0 |
| 1993 | 126,965 | 8.01% | 3rd | 0 / 26 | 0 | 0 / 16 | 0 |
| 1996 | 220,147 | 12.85% | 3rd | 2 / 25 | 2 | 0 / 16 | 0 |
| 2000 | 306,268 | 18.62% | 3rd | 3 / 25 | 1 | 0 / 16 | 0 |
| 2004 | 208,688 | 11.37% | 3rd | 2 / 24 | 1 | 0 / 16 | 0 |
| 2008 | 212,543 | 11.51% | 3rd | 2 / 23 | 0 | 0 / 16 | 0 |
| 2011 | 184,037 | 11.18% | 3rd | 2 / 23 | 0 | 0 / 16 | 0 |
| 2015 | Within Nós | | | 0 / 23 | 2 | 0 / 16 | 0 |
| 2016 | 45,252 | 2.89% | 5th | 0 / 23 | 0 | 0 / 16 | 0 |
| 2019 (Apr) | 94,433 | 5.74% | 5th | 0 / 23 | 0 | 0 / 16 | 0 |
| 2019 (Nov) | 120,456 | 8.09% | 4th | 1 / 23 | 1 | 0 / 16 | 0 |
| 2023 | 152,327 | 9.48% | 4th | 1 / 23 | 0 | 0 / 16 | 0 |

=== European Parliament ===
| Election | Total | | | | | Galicia | | |
| Election | Votes | % | # | Seats | +/– | Votes | % | # |
|---|---|---|---|---|---|---|---|---|
| 1987 | 53,116 | 0.28% | 21st | 0 / 60 | — | 45,525 | 3.70% | 4th |
| 1989 | 46,052 | 0.29% | 21st | 0 / 60 | 0 | 38,968 | 4.17% | 5th |
| 1994 | 139,221 | 0.75% | 10th | 0 / 64 | 0 | 132,507 | 11.40% | 3rd |
| 1999 | 349,079 | 1.65% | 7th | 1 / 64 | 1 | 335,193 | 21.98% | 3rd |
| 2004 | Within Galeusca | | | 0 / 54 | 1 | 141,756 | 12.32% | 3rd |
| 2009 | Within EdP–V | | | 0 / 54 | 0 | 103,724 | 9.08% | 3rd |
| 2014 | Within LPD | | | 0 / 54 | 0 | 80,394 | 7.88% | 5th |
| 2019 | Within AR | | | 1 / 59 | 1 | 172,088 | 11.80% | 3rd |
| 2024 | Within AR | | | 1 / 61 | 1 | 180,710 | 16.13% | 3rd |

=== Local councils ===
| Election | Spain | | | Galicia | | |
| Election | Votes | % | Seats won | Votes | % | Seats won |
|---|---|---|---|---|---|---|
| 1983 | 50,025 | 0.3 | 117 / 67,312 | 50,025 | 4.1 | 117 / 4,033 |
| 1987 | 61,256 | 0.3 | 139 / 65,577 | 61,256 | 4.5 | 139 / 4,044 |
| 1991 | 107,932 | 0.6 | 241 / 66,308 | 107,932 | 7.7 | 241 / 4,033 |
| 1995 | 208,098 | 0.9 | 428 / 65,869 | 208,098 | 13.2 | 428 / 3,932 |
| 1999 | 290,187 | 1.4 | 586 / 65,201 | 290,187 | 18.5 | 586 / 3,901 |
| 2003 | 325,331 | 1.4 | 595 / 65,510 | 325,331 | 19.4 | 595 / 3,873 |
| 2007 | 315,279 | 1.4 | 661 / 68,230 | 315,279 | 19.2 | 661 / 3,901 |
| 2011 | 261,513 | 1.2 | 590 / 68,230 | 261,513 | 16.5 | 590 / 3,811 |
| 2015 | 189,465 | 0.9 | 468 / 67,515 | 189,465 | 12.9 | 468 / 3,766 |
| 2019 | 194,462 | 0.85 | 456 / 67,121 | 194,462 | 12.87 | 456 / 3,721 |
| 2023 | 248,676 | 1.11 | 590 / 67,121 | 248,676 | 17.25 | 590 / 3,705 |

== See also ==
- Galician nationalism
- Xosé Manuel Beiras
- Anxo Quintana
- Camilo Nogueira Román
- Parliament of Galicia
- Regional Government of Galicia

== Bibliography ==
- Barreiro, H. et al. (2002): "A Galicia política e o nacionalismo do BNG", in Tempos Novos, no. 59, p. 24–33
- Beramendi, J.G. (2003): "Fin de ciclo no BNG? : Beiras desafía a hexemonía da UPG", in Tempos novos, p. 48–50
- BNG (2004): Documento de bases para a elaboración dun novo Estatuto para Galiza
- Fernández Baz, M.A. (2003): A formación do nacionalismo galego contemporáneo (1963–1984), Laiovento
- Rodríguez, F. (1999): "Fundación da UPG na frente nacionalista BNG", in Terra e tempo, no. 12, p. 43–45
