= Emilio Pérez Touriño =

Spanish politician and economist

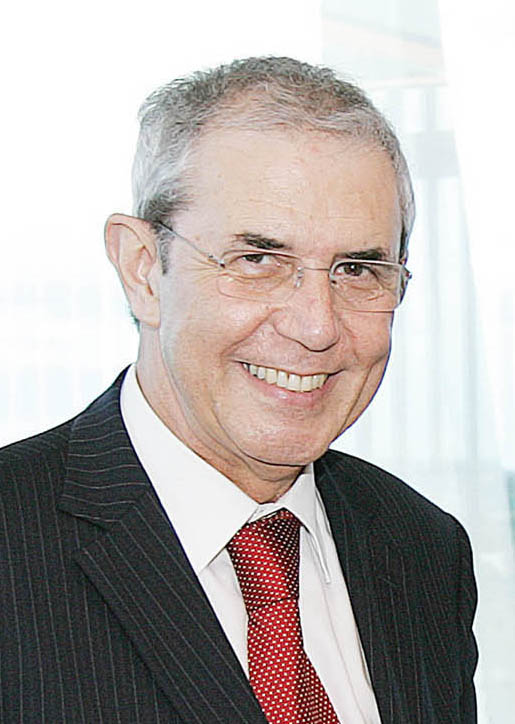

President of the Regional Government of Galicia
- In office 2 August 2005 – 17 April 2009
- Monarch: Juan Carlos I
- Vice President: Anxo Quintana
- Preceded by: Manuel Fraga
- Succeeded by: Alberto Núñez Feijóo

Secretary-General of the Socialists' Party of Galicia
- In office 10 October 1998 – 2 March 2009
- Preceded by: Francisco Vázquez Vázquez
- Succeeded by: Pachi Vázquez

Member of the Parliament of Galicia
- In office 20 November 2001 – 10 March 2010
- Constituency: Pontevedra
- In office 16 October 1997 – 20 November 2001
- Constituency: A Coruña

Member of the Congress of Deputies
- In office 3 March 1996 – 28 October 1997
- Constituency: Pontevedra

Personal details
- Born: Emilio Pérez Touriño; 8 August 1948 (age 78) A Coruña, Galicia, Spain
- Party: PSdeG–PSOE
- Spouse: Esther Cid
- Education: University of Santiago de Compostela
- Profession: Professor

Emilio Pérez Touriño (Spanish pronunciation: [eˈmiljo ˈpeɾeθ towˈɾiɲo]; born 8 August 1948) is a Spanish politician and economist. He is the former secretary general of the Socialists' Party of Galicia and, from August 2005 to March 2009, former president of the autonomous community of Galicia (Spain). Namely, he was president of the executive branch, the Xunta de Galicia. His political views are social democratic and Galicianist.

== Academic studies ==
An economist by profession, Pérez Touriño completed a course of specialisation at the University of Grenoble (France). He finished his doctoral degree in economics at the University of Santiago de Compostela. He was also vice-president for financial affairs in that same university. During his university years, Touriño developed an intense academic activity, teaching and publishing a number of works on economy and development. He would frequently use Galicia and Galicia's infrastructures as a case study in the integration with the European Union.

== Politics ==
During the transition to democracy (1975–1982), following the end of Francoist Spain, Touriño rebranded himself as a left wing political activist and even participated in the drafting of the Galician Statute of Autonomy of 1981. He joined the cabinet of minister Abel Caballero at the Spanish ministry for transportation, tourism and communications. He also worked in a senior position at the ministry for public works, transportation and the environment. In 1994, he was accused of having accepted irregular payments and as a result renounced to all his political posts and returned to academia. That same year he also received the Spanish Great Cross of Civil Merit. He eventually returned to politics in 1996 when he was elected to the Spanish Congress representing A Coruña Province though he resigned from Congress in 1997.

In 1998, Touriño replaced Francisco Vázquez as general secretary of the Socialists' Party of Galicia. In 2005 he became the president of Galicia, defeating Manuel Fraga's People's Party of Galicia, thanks to a coalition government established with the Galician Nationalist Bloc. Subsequently, both coalition parties were engaged by the Spanish Prime Minister, José Luis Rodríguez Zapatero, in reviewing the current Statute of Autonomy, in order to renegotiate the status of Galicia as a part of the Spanish State. He was re-elected secretary general of the Socialists' Party of Galicia in July 2008.

In the elections of 2009, his government was ousted by Alberto Núñez Feijóo of the PP.

== Academic publications (selection) ==
- _ (1982): "A Evolución da agricultura no capitalismo: a concepción dos clásicos do marxismo como paradigma dunha visión determinista do desenvolvemento histórico", in Revista galega de estudios agrarios, no. 6, p. 183–207.
- _ (1983): Agricultura y capitalismo: análisis de la pequeña producción campesina. Ministerio de Agricultura, Pesca y Alimentación, Servicio de Publicaciones Agrarias, Madrid.
- _ (1992): "Las infraestructuras como factor de despegue del desarrollo gallego", in Estructura económica de Galicia, González Laxe [dir]. Espasa-Calpe, Madrid, p. 429–488.
- _ et al. (1997): Infraestructuras y desarrollo regional: efectos económicos de la autopista del Atlántico. Civitas, Madrid.
- _ et al. (1998): Los Efectos económicos de las autovías de Galicia. Instituto de Estudios Económicos de Galicia Pedro Barrié de la Maza, A Coruña.
- _ (2001): En clave de país. Santa Comba, A Coruña.
- _ (2001): "Eurorrexión Galicia-Norte de Portugal, unha oportunidade e un reto", in Tempo exterior, no. 3, p. 17–22.

== See also ==
- Xunta de Galicia
- Parliament of Galicia
- Galician Statute of Autonomy of 1981
- Socialists' Party of Galicia
- Spanish Socialist Workers' Party

== Notes ==
Political offices
Preceded by Manuel Fraga Iribarne	President of the Regional Government of Galicia; 2005–2009	Succeeded by Alberto Núñez Feijoo
Party political offices
Preceded by Francisco Vázquez Vázquez	Secretary-General of the PSdeG–PSOE; 1998–2009	Succeeded by Pachi Vázquez
