= Abrente–Galician Democratic Left =

Abrente–Galician Democratic Left Abrente–Esquerda Democrática Galega
- Leader: Carlos Aymerich
- Founded: 2012
- Ideology: Galician nationalism Social democracy
- Political position: Centre-left to Left-wing
- National affiliation: BNG
- Trade union affiliation: Confederación Intersindical Galega

Website
- abrente-edg.org

Abrente–Galician Democratic Left (Abrente, Abrente–Esquerda Democrática Galega in Galician language) is a Galician political party formed in June 2012 as an internal current of the Galician Nationalist Bloc (BNG) with a Galician nationalist and social democratic ideology.

Its executive secretary is Carlos Aymerich. Among the members of this movement are former members of the Socialist Collective, Galician Unity and Inzar; as Ana Luisa Bouza, Camilo Nogueira, Xesús Veiga Buxán and the BNG mayors of municipalities like Bueu, Tomiño or Rianxo.

Abrente is generally considered the more moderate BNG sector, both in national and social issues. In the European elections of 2014 Abrente supported the option of a joint list with Anova-Nationalist Brotherhood and Compromiso por Galicia. Finally, only 5.8% of the BNG members supported the proposal of the common Galician nationalist candidacy, compared with the 85.4% who voted to concur with EH Bildu and 8.4% who voted in favor of a coalition with ERC.
