= Miguel Santalices =

Galician politician (born 1955)

Miguel Ángel Santalices Vieira
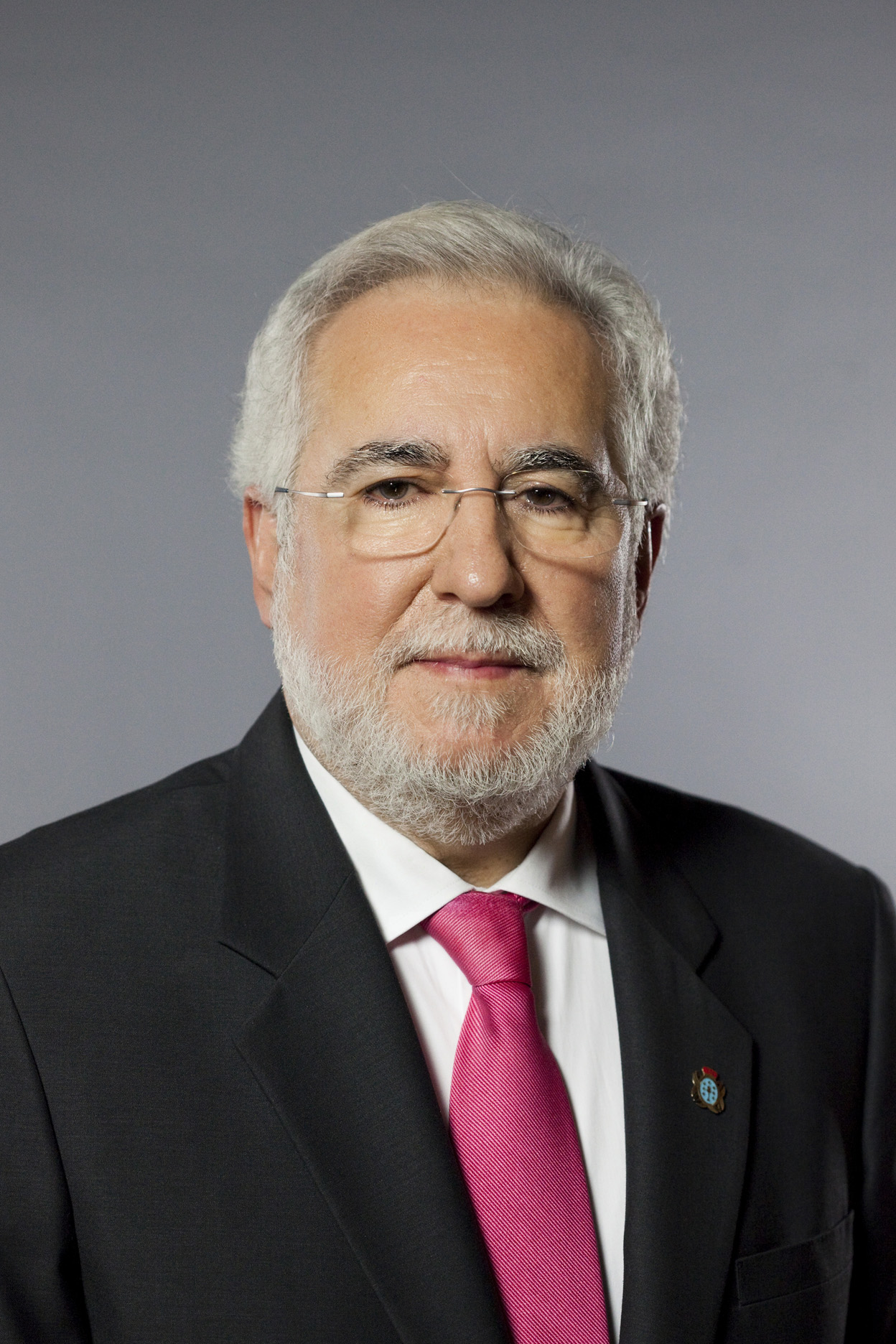

President of the Parliament of Galicia
- Incumbent
- Assumed office 26 January 2016
- Preceded by: Pilar Rojo

Member of the Parliament of Galicia
- Incumbent
- Assumed office 19 October 1997

Personal details
- Born: Miguel Ángel Santalices Vieira; 17 March 1955 (age 71) Bande, Province of Ourense, Galicia
- Party: People's Party
- Education: University of Santiago de Compostela
- Occupation: Politician, physician

Miguel Ángel Santalices Vieira is Spanish physician and politician from the People's Party of Galicia who has served as President of the Parliament of Galicia since 2016.
