= List of presidents of the Parliament of Galicia =

President of the Parliament of Galicia
- Presidentes do Parlamento de Galicia
- Flag of Galicia

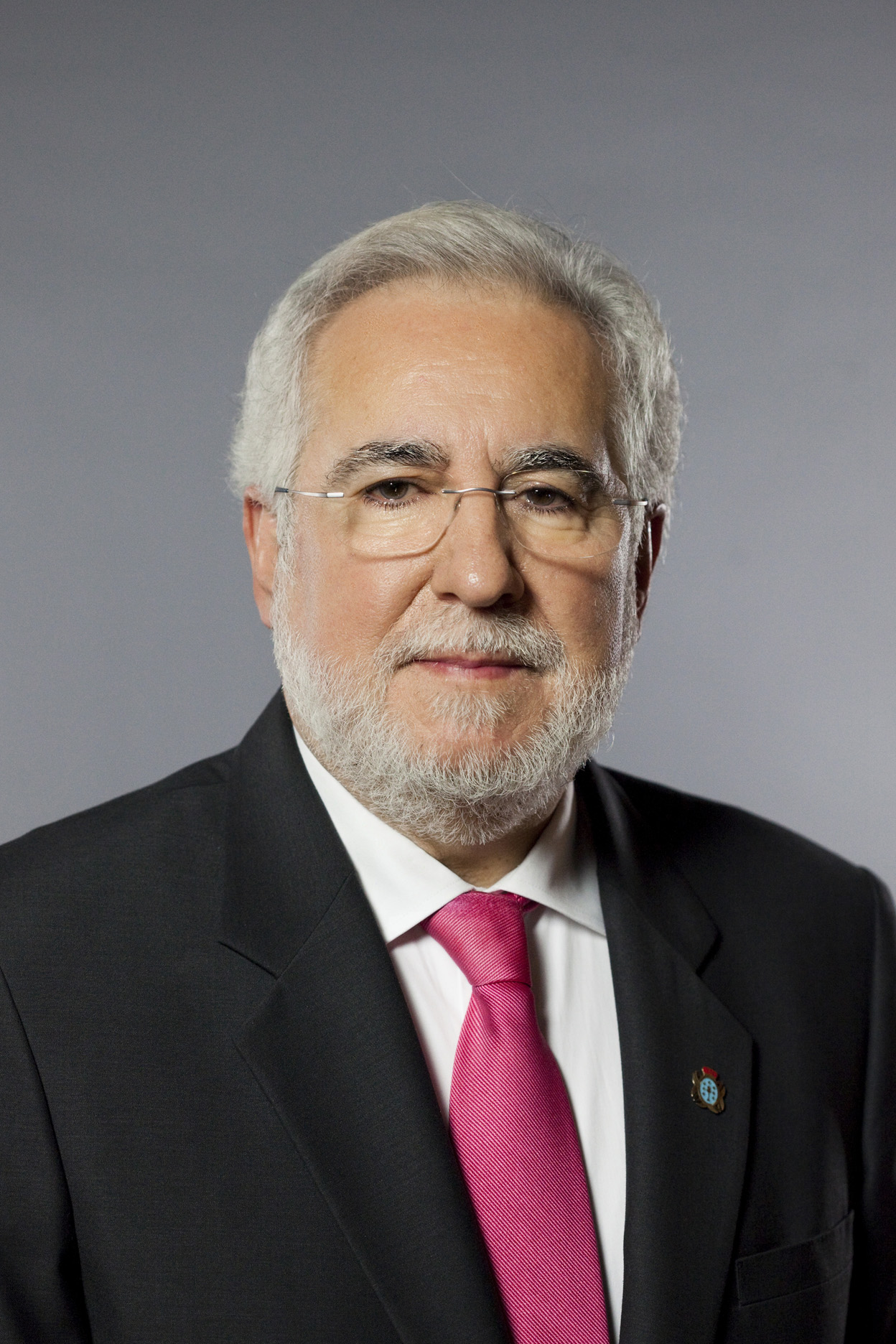
- Incumbent; Miguel Ángel Santalices since 26 January 2016
- Member of: Parliament of Galicia
- Formation: 19 December 1981
- First holder: Antonio Rosón

This article lists the presidents of the Parliament of Galicia, the regional legislature of Galicia.

== Presidents ==
^{No.}	Name	Portrait	Party	Took office	Left office	^{Legs.}	^{Refs.}
1	Antonio Rosón		People's Alliance	19 December 1981	20 October 1985	1st	
1	Antonio Rosón		People's Alliance	17 December 1985	24 April 1986	2nd	
2	Tomás Pérez		People's Alliance	13 May 1986	24 October 1989	2nd	
3	Vitorino Núñez		People's Party of Galicia	16 January 1990	24 August 1993	3rd	
3	Vitorino Núñez		People's Party of Galicia	16 November 1993	26 August 1997	4th	
4	José María García		People's Party of Galicia	18 November 1997	28 August 2001	5th	
4	José María García		People's Party of Galicia	20 November 2001	26 April 2005	6th	
5	Dolores Villarino		Socialists' Party of Galicia	18 July 2005	6 January 2009	7th	
6	Pilar Rojo		People's Party of Galicia	1 April 2009	27 August 2012	8th	
6	Pilar Rojo		People's Party of Galicia	16 December 2012	12 January 2016	9th	
7	Miguel Ángel Santalices		People's Party of Galicia	26 January 2016	1 August 2016	9th	
7	Miguel Ángel Santalices		People's Party of Galicia	21 October 2016		10th	
