= Socialist Youth of Galicia =

Socialist Youth of Galicia Xuventudes Socialistas de Galicia
- Founded: 1903; 1904
- Headquarters: Santiago de Compostela, Galicia
- Ideology: Social democracy Republicanism; Galicianism; Federalism; Feminism
- Mother party: Socialists' Party of Galicia
- International affiliation: International Union of Socialist Youth
- European affiliation: Young European Socialists
- Spanish affiliation: Socialist Youth of Spain
- Website: www.xsgalicia.org

Socialist Youth of Galicia (Galician: Xuventudes Socialistas de Galicia) is the youth organisation of the Socialists' Party of Galicia (PSdeG). The first socialist youth groups appeared in the Galician cities between 1903 and 1904.
