= Anxo Quintana =

Spanish politician

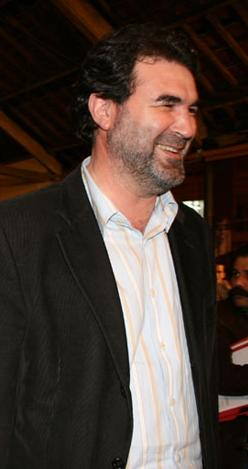

7th Vice President of the Xunta de Galicia
- In office August 2, 2005 – April 20, 2009
- Preceded by: Alberto Núñez Feijóo
- Succeeded by: Alfonso Rueda

Spanish Senator
- In office 2000–2005

Mayor of Allariz
- In office 1989–1999
- Preceded by: Leopoldo Pérez Camba
- Succeeded by: Francisco García Suárez

Personal details
- Born: 25 February 1959 (age 67) Allariz, Ourense, Spain
- Party: Bloque Nacionalista Gallego
- Spouse: Cristina Cid
- Children: 2
- Education: University of Santiago de Compostela
- Occupation: Nurse

Anxo Manuel Quintana González, commonly known as Anxo Quintana, is the former leader of the Galician Nationalist Bloc (Bloque Nacionalista Galego, BNG), the main nationalist party in Galicia. From 2005 to 2009 he was a partner in the Galician Government, holding the positions of Vice-President and Minister for Social Affairs.

Quintana was born in Allariz, Ourense Province, on February 25, 1959. After graduating in Nursing at the University of Vigo he worked at the Cristal Piñor Hospital in Ourense. He has been distinguished with an honorary award from the Society of General Medicine for his work in primary healthcare in rural communities.

== Political career ==
As a politician, he started working with the rural nationalist trade unionism in his youth. He has been a member of the Galician Nationalist Bloc since its foundation in 1982.

Quintana rose to national prominence in 1989, when he was appointed as Mayor of Allariz, and remained so until 2000, winning local elections with a clear overall majority. During his terms, the small municipality of Allariz was awarded the European Prize of Urbanism and it was chosen by the United Nations as one of the leading communities on sustainable development. From 1995 to 2000 Quintana was also chair of the Galician Federation of Provinces and Municipalities .

In 1999, he was appointed by the Parliament of Galicia as senator in the Spanish Senate as the sole representative of the BNG. He eventually had to leave his municipal office in 2000 due to clashes with his new role as senator. In 2003 he replaced charismatic Xosé Manuel Beiras in the leadership of BNG.

Following the 2005 Galician elections and subsequent political pacts with the Socialists' Party of Galicia (PSdG), Quintana became Vice-President of Galicia, serving until 2009. He also held responsibilities as Conselleiro (Minister) for Social Affairs. Quintana expressed that some of his main goals during his term were:

- Promotion of Galician language and culture
- Extending social services to all citizens, with a special attention to women as a disadvantaged group
- Achieving the official recognition from the Spanish government of Galicia as a nation
- Reform of the Statute of Autonomy
- Re-negotiating tax revenues from the Spanish central government in order to endorse Galicia with more financial resources

== Controversy ==
During his time in the Galician Government, Quintana came under criticism from within the ranks of BNG as he was being accused of trying to centralize all powers, thus reducing the influence of the assemblies and the average party member. This criticism and claims for "transparency and internal democracy" resulted in the formation of two parallel organizations within the party: the Encontro Irmandinho (led by former BNG president Xosé Manuel Beiras), and the Movemento Pola Base. At present Quintana has withdrawn from the political front line although remains a member of the party and occasionally features in the daily press.

== See also ==
- Galician nationalism
- Galician Nationalist Bloc
- Xunta de Galicia
