= Regional Government of Galicia =

Government of the Spanish autonomous region of Galicia

Regional Government of Galicia Xunta de Galicia
- Jurisdiction: Galicia

History
- Established: 1981

Authority and accountability
- Appointed by: King of Spain
- Responsible to: Parliament of Galicia

Operations
- Website: www.xunta.gal

Seat
- Santiago de Compostela

The Regional Government of Galicia (officially in Galician: Xunta de Galicia, Galician pronunciation: [ˈʃuntɐ ðɪ ɣaˈliθjɐ]) is the collective decision-making body of the government of the autonomous community of Galicia, composed of the President, the Vice-president(s) and the specialized ministers (Conselleiros).

The Regional Government is based at Santiago de Compostela, the Galician government capital. The Xunta de Galicia has delegations in the four provincial capital cities of Galicia: A Coruña, Pontevedra, Ourense and Lugo.

== Legal basis ==
Article 16, Section 2 of the Galician Statute of Autonomy states that

The Vice presidents and Ministers shall be appointed and dismissed by the President.

== History ==
The Regional Government of Galicia (or Xunta) finds its origins in the Xunta of the Kingdom of Galicia active between 1528 and 1833. The Xunta was Galicia's representation to the central Spanish monarchy. The Xunta was composed of representatives from the cities (dioceses) of Santiago de Compostela, Lugo, Betanzos, A Coruña, Mondoñedo, Ourense, and Tui. But at that time, the Xunta did not hold real power; it was a consultative body only.

During the Peninsular War, which started in 1808, the Xunta Suprema de Galicia directed the war against the French invaders and maintained the public order in Galician territory. This Xunta Suprema was in charge of military, legislative issues, and international relations. It was the first time that the Xunta had real autonomy, as the Spanish control weakened. This situation lasted until the French invaders were eventually expelled from the Iberian Peninsula and Ferdinand VII of Spain gradually recovered control over former territories (1813–1814).

In 1833, the Xunta was dismantled following the provincial division engaged in Spain by minister Javier de Burgos, under the regency of Maria Christina of the Two Sicilies. In this way, Galicia was separated into four provinces, each one managed by a Provincial Council.

Yet, in 1843, the Xunta Central de Galicia was created and presided over by Xosé Maria Suances. In 1846, commander Miguel Solís initiated a military uprising in Lugo. He put an end to the Provincial Councils and created the Xunta Superior do Goberno de Galicia, presided over by Pio Rodríguez Terrazo. This movement attempted to re-unify Galicia and called for Galicia's self-rule. Solís was eventually defeated at the Battle of Cacheiras (23 April 1846) and the so-called Martyrs of Carral were executed on 27 April.

Prospects for Galician self-government and possible restoration of a Xunta came close while the Galician Statute of Autonomy of 1936 was being discussed at the time of the Spanish Second Republic (1931–1939). However, the Spanish Civil War (1936–1939) and subsequent Francoist Spain (1939–1977) halted the process. There was a temporary Galician government in exile, presided by Castelao, although this was not called Xunta but Consello da Galiza (Council of Galicia).

The process of devolution initiated by the passing of the Spanish Constitution in 1978 allowed for the establishment of a new Xunta on 16 March 1978. The Galician Statute of Autonomy (1981), came to ratify the Xunta and Galicia's self-government.

== Current cabinet ==
The consellerías are the different departments, or ministries, of the Xunta de Galicia. They are the responsibility of the conselleiros (masculine) or conselleiras (feminine). The conselleiros and conselleiras form the actual cabinet of the government, close to the President.

== Location ==
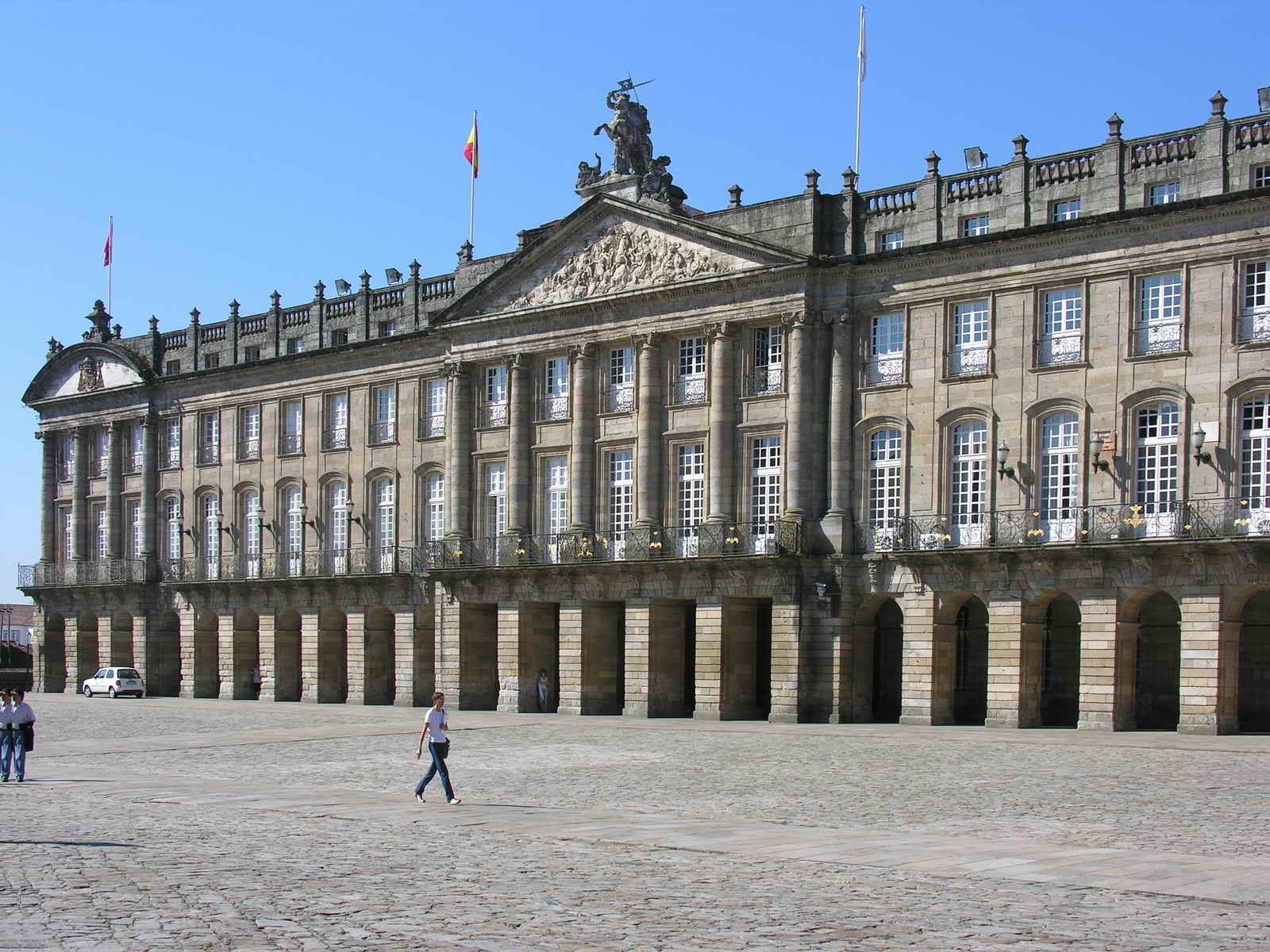
Pazo de Raxoi, in Santiago de Compostela.

- Edificios Administrativos San Caetano
  San Caetano, s/n
  15704 - Santiago de Compostela (A Coruña).
- Pazo de Raxoi
  Praza do Obradoiro
  15705 - Santiago de Compostela (A Coruña).
- Sede Provincial da Xunta de Galicia na Coruña
  Vicente Ferrer, 2
  15008 - A Coruña (A Coruña).
- Sede Provincial da Xunta de Galicia en Pontevedra
  Fernández Ladreda, 43
  36003 - Pontevedra (Pontevedra).
- Sede Provincial da Xunta de Galicia en Ourense
  Habana, 79
  32004 - Ourense (Ourense).
- Sede Provincial da Xunta de Galicia en Lugo
  Ronda da Muralla, 70
  27001 - Lugo (Lugo).
- Sede local da Xunta de Galicia en Vigo
  Concepción Arenal, 8
  36201 - Vigo (Pontevedra).
- Sede local da Xunta de Galicia en Ferrol
  Praza de España, 2
  15403 - Ferrol (A Coruña).

== See also ==
- Reintegrationism
- Galician Statute of Autonomy of 1981
- Parliament of Galicia
- President of Galicia
- Anxo Quintana
- Emilio Pérez Touriño
