= Neocolonial dependence =

Marxist notion

Neocolonial dependence, also known as the Neocolonial Dependence Model or Dependency Theory is an indirect outgrowth of Marxist thinking which is a subgroup of development economics. According to this doctrine, third world underdevelopment is viewed as the result of highly unequal international capitalist system or rich country-poor country relationships.

Unlike the Stage Theories or the Structural Change Models of economic development, which considered underdevelopment as a result of internal constraints such as insufficient savings, investment or lack of infrastructure, skill or education, the proponents of the Neocolonial Dependence model portray third world underdevelopment as an externally induced phenomenon. Advanced nations use their economic, political, and military power to extract surplus value from developing and underdeveloped nations, thus keeping the latter underdeveloped and condemning them to perpetual class conflicts and oppressive governments.

Marxist theory is considered to be the basis of this model, as it emerged from an analysis of economic inequalities wherein the poverty of the working class is seen not as an unrelated personal failing, but a direct result of their oppressive treatment at the hands of the ruling class. The Dependency theory expands that worldview to a global scale, showing the similarities between the working class of a nation and the working nations (developing nations, resource rich- but still somehow very poor nations) of the world.
