= Parliament of Galicia =

Unicameral legislature of the autonomous community of Galicia, Spain

Coordinates: 42.8729°N 8.5439°W

Parliament of Galicia Parlamento de Galicia
- XII Legislature

Type
- Type: Unicameral

Leadership
- President: Miguel Santalices, PPdeG since 26 January 2016
- Vice President: María Elena Candia López, PPdeG since 24 May 2022
- Second Vice President: María Montserrat Prado Cores, BNG since 24 May 2022
- Secretary: María Corina Porro Martínez, PPdeG since 24 May 2022
- Vice Secretary: Marina Ortega Otero, PSdeG since 7 August 2020

Structure
- Seats: 75
- Political groups: Government (40): PP (40); Opposition (35): BNG (25); PSdeG-PSOE (9); DO (1)
- Committees: List: Institutional: General Administration, Justice & Interior; Territorial Planning, Public Works, Environment & Services; Economy, Tax office; Education & Culture; Health, Social Policy & Employment; Industry, Energy, Commerce & Tourism; Agriculture, Food Production, Livestock & Forestry; Fishing & Shellfish

Elections
- Voting system: Proportional representation
- Last election: 18 February 2024

Meeting place
- Salón de Plenos; Pazo do Hórreo; Santiago de Compostela; Galicia, Spain

Website
- https://www.parlamentodegalicia.gal/

The Parliament of Galicia (Galician: Parlamento de Galicia) is the unicameral legislature of the autonomous community of Galicia, Spain. It is formed by 75 deputies (deputados). Deputies are elected every four years in ordinary period, or extraordinarily upon dissolution and call of elections by the President of the Xunta of Galicia, by universal suffrage in proportional lists with the four Galician provinces serving as constituencies.

== Functions ==
The Parliament:

- Exercises legislative power.
- Controls the executive branch or Xunta de Galicia.
- Has power over the budget of Galicia.
- Approves Acts and Statutes.
- Appoints the senators for Galicia in the Spanish Senate
- Appoints the President of the Xunta from among its members.
- Demands accountability from the President and Government of Galicia.
- Has the ability to propose State laws to the Spanish Parliament and request further enhancements of the autonomy and self-government via organic laws.
- Sponsors constitutional lawsuits to protect its devolved powers before the Constitutional Court of Spain.

== Seat ==
The Galician Parliament meets at the Pazo do Hórreo in the Galician capital of Santiago de Compostela.

== Elections ==
The 75 members of the Parliament of Galicia are elected in 4 multi-member districts using the D'Hondt method and a closed-list proportional representation for four-year terms. Each district is entitled to an initial minimum of 10 seats, with the remaining 35 seats being allocated among the four provinces in proportion to their populations. Only lists polling above 5% of the total vote in each district (which includes blank ballots—for none of the above) are entitled to enter the seat distribution. However, in some districts there is a higher effective threshold at the constituency level, depending on the district magnitude.

The most recent elections were held on 18 February 2024 with the People's Party of Galicia (PP) remaining the largest party with 40 seats. The Galician Nationalist Bloc (BNG) won 25 seats, the Socialists' Party of Galicia (PSdeG–PSOE) won 9 and DO won 1. The next election is expected to take place in 2028.

=== Results of the elections to the Parliament of Galicia ===
Deputies in the Parliament of Galicia since 1981
Key to parties BNPG–PSG PCE–PCG BNG EG PSG–EG AGE In Tide PSdeG–PSOE UCD CG DO PP AP–PDP–PL–CdG AP
Election	Distribution	President
1981	3 / 1 / 1 / 16 / 24 / 26	Gerardo Fernández Albor (AP)
1985	1 / 3 / 22 / 11 / 34	Gerardo Fernández Albor (CP)
1987 no-confidence motion	1 / 3 / 22 / 5 / 11 / 29	Fernando González Laxe (PSdeG-PSOE)
1989	5 / 2 / 28 / 2 / 38	Manuel Fraga (PP)
1993	13 / 19 / 43	Manuel Fraga (PP)
1997	18 / 15 / 42	Manuel Fraga (PP)
2001	17 / 17 / 41	Manuel Fraga (PP)
2005	13 / 25 / 37	Emilio Pérez Touriño (PSdeG–PSOE)
2009	12 / 25 / 38	Alberto Núñez Feijóo (PP)
2012	7 / 9 / 18 / 41	Alberto Núñez Feijóo (PP)
2016	6 / 14 / 14 / 41	Alberto Núñez Feijóo (PP)
2020	19 / 14 / 42	Alberto Núñez Feijóo (PP) (2020-2022) Alfonso Rueda (PP) (2022-2024)
2024	25 / 9 / 1 / 40	Alfonso Rueda (PP)

== Presidents ==
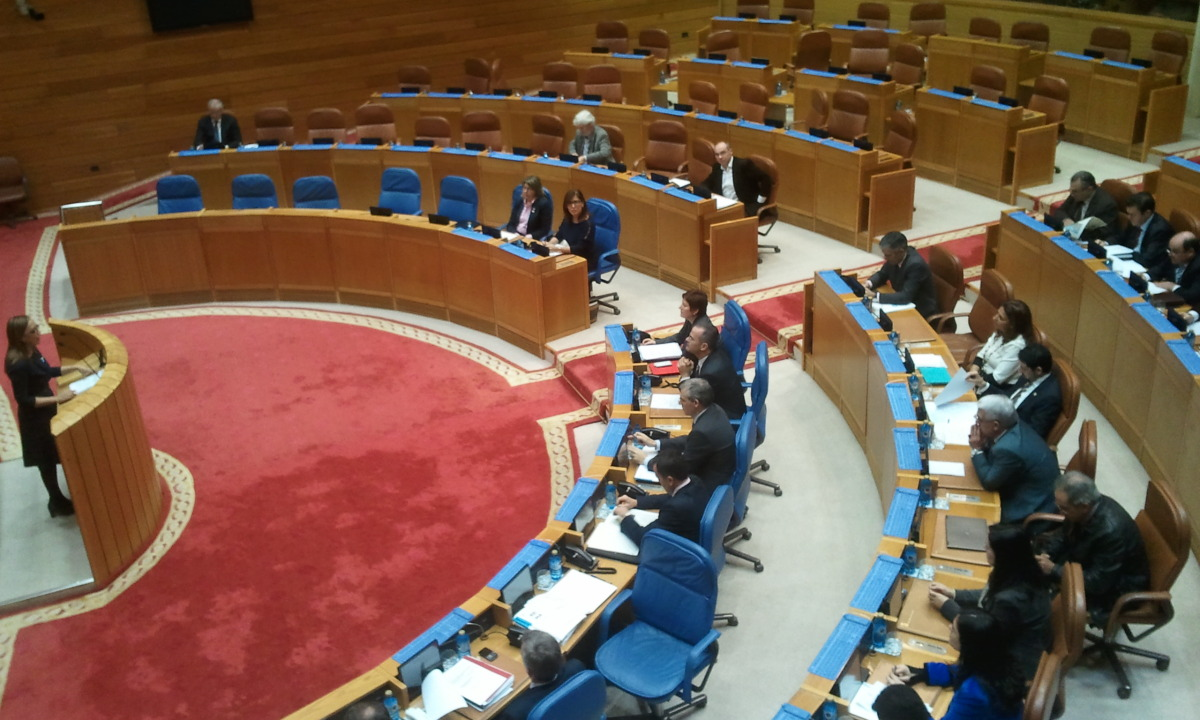
The meeting chamber of the Parliament of Galicia

== See also ==
- Xunta de Galicia
- Galicia
- President of Galicia
- History of Galicia
- Galician Statute of Autonomy of 1981
- High Court of Galicia
