= Inzar =

Inzar Inzar
- President: Xesús Veiga Buxán
- Founded: 1991
- Dissolved: 2012
- Merger of: Communist Movement of Galicia; Revolutionary Communist League
- Headquarters: Santiago de Compostela, Galiza
- Membership (2002): 234
- Ideology: Socialism; Galician nationalism Feminism; Pacifism; Antimilitarism
- National affiliation: Galician Nationalist Bloc
- Local seats (1991-1993): 1 / 4,033

Inzar was a political group created with the union of the Communist Movement of Galicia and the Revolutionary Communist League of Galicia. It was constituted as political party in 1991 linked to Izquierda Alternativa. In 1993 it was integrated in the Galician Nationalist Bloc (BNG), having always little political weight in the bloc.

Inzar had 234 members (2002) when it finally became a "collective" inside the BNG. Xesús Veiga Buxán, who was an MP in the Parliament of Galicia, was it most-recognized leader.

Inzar announced its self-dissolution in 2012.
