= Statute of Autonomy of Galicia of 1981 =

- Created: 1978
- Ratified: 6 April 1981
- Signatories: Juan Carlos I, Leopoldo Calvo-Sotelo

The Statute of Autonomy of Galicia of 1981 (Galician: Estatuto de Autonomía de Galicia) is the current basic institutional norm of Galicia. The Galician Government, Parliament and High Court of Galicia are regulated by it.

== Genesis of the 1981 Statute ==
The Statute passed in 1981 has its precedent in the Statute that had been drafted and voted in 1936. This earlier Statute could not be implemented due to the Spanish coup of July 1936 and the Spanish Civil War, which started in 1936. Hence, with the end of Francoist Spain in 1977, a process of devolution began in the Spanish State. This political and administrative process took form in the passing of the Statutes of Autonomy, regulated by the Spanish Constitution of 1978.

On 16 March 1979, Galicia attained the rank of "pre-autonomous community", and in June 1979 Galician members to the Spanish Parliament submitted a draft for a Statute of Autonomy. Once the Constitutional Committee and the Spanish Parliamentary Assembly altered this first draft, it was finally ratified by the Galician people in a referendum held in December 1980. It came into effect on 6 April 1981 after being signed by King Juan Carlos I of Spain and by Leopoldo Calvo Sotelo, President of the Spanish government, in the Spanish Royal Palace. Galicia then became an autonomous community.

However, this new Statute soon came under intense criticism as it was considered not sufficiently ambitious. The 1981 Statute was not initially supported by Galician nationalist parties since they considered it "limited" compared to the 1936 one. For example, the 1936 statute endorsed Galicia with control over the economy and taxes, and also with the unique power to nationalize, rights not contemplated in 1981, among others. Nevertheless, the 1981 statute formed the cornerstone of future Galician political evolution, despite it being an end in itself for some and a point of departure for others.

== Powers endorsed by the Statute ==
The 1981 Statute of Autonomy recognises Galicia as a historical nationality, a cultural and geographical unit entitled to self-government in democracy.

The Statute recognises Galicia the following specific powers, abilities and competencies (among others):

- The organisation of the self-government institutions
- The regulation of Galician national symbols: flag, anthem and coat of arms
- The creation of new municipalities and territorial adjustments in existing ones. The establishment of the comarca (region) and the parroquia (parish) as official administrative territorial tiers
- The development of policies for territorial management, urban management and housing
- The planning and development of public works
- The management of railways and roads whose infrastructures entirely belong to the autonomous community
- The management of harbours, heliports and recreational airports and, in general, those not involved in commercial activities
- The implementation of policies in relation to agriculture and farming, in accordance with the State's general law of economy
- The management of forestry and the development and exploitation of public land
- Management of the environment and protection of nature
- Projects relating to the construction and management of irrigation activities involving the upkeep of channels, hydraulic functions and mineral and thermal waters
- Legal regulation of fishing in inland waters, fisheries, hunting, river fishing and shellfish exploitation
- The regulation, promotion and management of festivals, fairs and markets
- The promotion of the economic development of the Autonomous Community within the objectives established in the national economic policy
- The protection, promotion and management of handicraft and fine arts
- The management of museums, libraries and music schools
- Heritage management
- The promotion of culture, research and investigation. The Galician government has the right and obligation to use and promote the Galician language at all levels
- Promotion of sport and management of sporting and leisure activities
- Social assistance (social work)
- The management of the health system. Management of sanitary and hygiene services and infrastructures
- Surveillance and protection of buildings and installations
- The right to create an independent police force
- The control and management of foundations and co-operatives, casinos and gambling, trade centres for goods and asset values, and fishing associations
- Competencies regarding environmental management, landscape and nature protection
- Competencies regarding forestry and woodland use and management, as well as the management of inland waters
- Control and protection of the Galician coast (except for international issues)
- Galicia has its own institute of statistics and a number of other official scientific institutes, regulated by law
- The Galician government has almost exclusive competencies on education at all levels (schools and universities), and cultural issues in general
- The regulation of advertising and publicity
- Galicia has its own public radio and television broadcasting company (CRTVG), regulated by law
- The Galician government regulates pharmaceutical services
- The Galician government has extended competencies in the management of fishing harbours, the fishing sector, sea rescue, mines and energy exploitation
- Industrial and intellectual property is responsibility of the Galician Government
- The Galician government has additional competencies in public finance, taxes, and management of the economy and internal market, in accordance with the general regulations of the Spanish state.
- The Galician government has the right to create, modify and implement its own legal system, in accordance with the general regulations of the Spanish state. This is officially known as the Galician Civil Code (noted in Art. 27, fourth point, of the statute of autonomy)
- The Galician government has full powers in tourism management and promotion.

Some of these rights and powers have not been exercised, or not fully. Some other have. Still, the Galician government is entitled to request the transfer of further competencies to the Spanish Parliament by means of an organic law. In this fashion, Galicia gains further powers slowly but gradually. Still, certain issues are reserved for the Spanish government only as specified by the Spanish Constitution (1978). These include the military and international relations. Likewise, the right for self-determination (claimed by nationalist groups) is not recognised either.

== Reform of the Statute ==
With the establishment of the new Galician government following the elections of 2005, debates were initiated in the Parliament on a possible reform of the Statute. Indeed, reform of the Statute and further devolution had been on the agenda of the new parties in government: the Galician Socialist Party and, namely, the Galician Nationalist Bloc. A consensus was sought with the third party in the chamber, the PPdeG.

Yet, it was mentioned that the new Statute should recognise Galicia not just as an historical nationality, but as a nation. This issue was frontally rejected by the PPdeG and therefore conversations were put on hold. Although there is a still a parliamentary commission working on the development of a draft for a new Statute, it is expected that political discussions on the question of "nationality" will not be resolved easily.

== See also ==
- Statute of Autonomy of Galicia of 1936
- Autonomous Community
- Historical nationalities
- Galician nationalism
- History of Galicia
- Devolution
