= Socialist Collective =

Socialist Collective Colectivo Socialista
- Leader: Mario López Rico
- Founded: 1983
- Dissolved: 2012
- Ideology: Galician nationalism Left-wing nationalism Democratic socialism

The Socialist Collective (CS, Colectivo Socialista in Galician language) was a Galician political organization that was part of the Galician Nationalist Bloc (BNG).

The organization was founded in 1983, when the Galician Socialist Party (PSG) decided not to join the BNG and a group of dissenting militants of the PSG formed the Socialist Collective, entering the BNG. CS was always very supportive of the Xosé Manuel Beiras leadership of the Galician Nationalist Bloc.

The CS had about 150 militants in 2002. The leaders of the collective were Mario López Rico and Francisco Trigo Durán. The collective dissolved in 2012.
