= People's Party of Galicia =

Political party in Galicia, Spain

People's Party of Galicia Partido Popular de Galicia
- Abbreviation: PP
- President: Alfonso Rueda
- Secretary-General: Paula Prado del Río
- Honorary Presidents: Mariano Rajoy; José Manuel Romay Beccaría
- Founded: 1989
- Headquarters: Santiago de Compostela, Spain
- Newspaper: Hoxe e Noticia
- Youth wing: Novas Xeracións
- Membership (2015): ▲101,336
- Ideology: Conservatism; Christian democracy; Galicianism
- Political position: Centre-right to right-wing
- National affiliation: People's Party
- Parliament of Galicia: 40 / 75
- Congress of Deputies (Galician seats): 13 / 23
- Spanish Senate (Galician seats): 13 / 19
- Provincial deputations: 51 / 108
- Mayors in Galicia: 145 / 313
- Town councillors in Galicia: 1,629 / 3,721

Website
- www.ppdegalicia.gal

The People's Party of Galicia (Galician & Spanish: Partido Popular de Galicia [paɾˈtiðo popuˈlaɾ ðe ɣaˈliθja], PP or PPdeG [peˈpe ðe ˈɣa]) is a conservative political party in Galicia, Spain. It is the Galician affiliate of the Spanish People's Party.

Prior to the 2005 Galician elections, the PPdeG had been in power for 15 years. In the election, the party won one seat shy of an absolute majority. The other two parties with deputies (Spanish Socialist Workers' Party and Galician Nationalist Bloc) were then able to form a governing coalition.

The party returned to power in the 2009 Galician elections and has been the governing party since.

== Organisation ==
=== Presidents ===
- Xerardo Fernández Albor (1989–1991)
- Manuel Fraga Iribarne (1991–2006)
- Alberto Núñez Feijoo (2006–2022)
- Alfonso Rueda (2022–present)

=== Secretaries-general ===
- José Cuiña Crespo (1991–1999)
- Xesús Palmou (1999–2006)
- Alfonso Rueda (2006–2016)
- Miguel Tellado (2016–2022)
- Paula Prado del Río (2022–present)

== Electoral performance ==
=== Parliament of Galicia ===
Parliament of Galicia
Election	Votes	%	#	Seats	+/–	Leading candidate	Status in legislature
1989	583,579	44.02%	1st	38 / 75	4	Manuel Fraga	Majority
1993	763,839	52.14%	1st	43 / 75	5	Manuel Fraga	Majority
1997	832,751	52.19%	1st	42 / 75	1	Manuel Fraga	Majority
2001	791,885	51.62%	1st	41 / 75	1	Manuel Fraga	Majority
2005	756,562	45.23%	1st	37 / 75	4	Manuel Fraga	Opposition
2009	789,427	46.68%	1st	38 / 75	1	Alberto Núñez Feijóo	Majority
2012	661,281	45.80%	1st	41 / 75	3	Alberto Núñez Feijóo	Majority
2016	682,150	47.56%	1st	41 / 75	0	Alberto Núñez Feijóo	Majority
2020	625,182	47.98%	1st	42 / 75	1	Alberto Núñez Feijóo	Majority
2024	700,491	47.36%	1st	40 / 75	2	Alfonso Rueda	Majority

=== Cortes Generales ===
Cortes Generales
Election	Galicia						
Election	Congress					Senate	
Election	Votes	%	#	Seats	+/–	Seats	+/–
1989	519,168	39.02%	1st	14 / 27	1 (Note: Compared to People's Coalition totals in the 1986 general election.)	12 / 16	2
1993	746,964	47.12%	1st	15 / 26	1	12 / 16	0
1996	827,405	48.31%	1st	14 / 25	1	12 / 16	0
2000	888,092	53.99%	1st	16 / 25	2	12 / 16	0
2004	865,460	47.15%	1st	12 / 24	4	12 / 16	0
2008	809,879	43.86%	1st	11 / 23	1	12 / 16	0
2011	864,567	52.53%	1st	15 / 23	4	12 / 16	0
2015	609,623	37.12%	1st	10 / 23	5	12 / 16	0
2016	650,831	41.53%	1st	12 / 23	2	12 / 16	0
2019 (Apr)	447,562	27.42%	2nd	9 / 23	3	8 / 16	4
2019 (Nov)	475,198	31.93%	1st	10 / 23	1	11 / 16	3
2023	712,881	43.58%	1st	13 / 23	3	13 / 19	2

=== European Parliament ===
European Parliament
Election	Galicia		
Election	Votes	%	#
1989	313,124	33.48%	1st
1994	634,364	54.56%	1st
1999	760,863	49.89%	1st
2004	549,073	47.72%	1st
2009	571,320	50.01%	1st
2014	359,068	35.19%	1st
2019	434,337	29.79%	2nd
2024	491,369	43.63%	1st
