= Socialists' Party of Galicia =

Centre-Left political party in Galicia, Spain

Socialists' Party of Galicia Partido dos Socialistas de Galicia
- President: Carmela Silva Rego
- Secretary-General: Valentín González Formoso
- Spokesperson: Maria Pierres López
- Headquarters: Rúa do Pino, 1-9 Baixo; 15704 Santiago de Compostela
- Newspaper: Socialismo Galego
- Youth wing: Socialist Youth of Galicia
- Membership (2019): ▼9,993
- Ideology: Social democracy; Galicianism; Federalism
- Political position: Centre-left
- National affiliation: Spanish Socialist Workers' Party
- Colors: Red
- Parliament of Galicia: 9 / 75
- Congress of Deputies Galician seats: 7 / 23
- Spanish Senate Galician seats: 6 / 19
- Provincial deputations: 37 / 108
- Mayors: 111 / 313
- Municipal councils: 1,181 / 3,721

Website
- www.psdeg-psoe.com

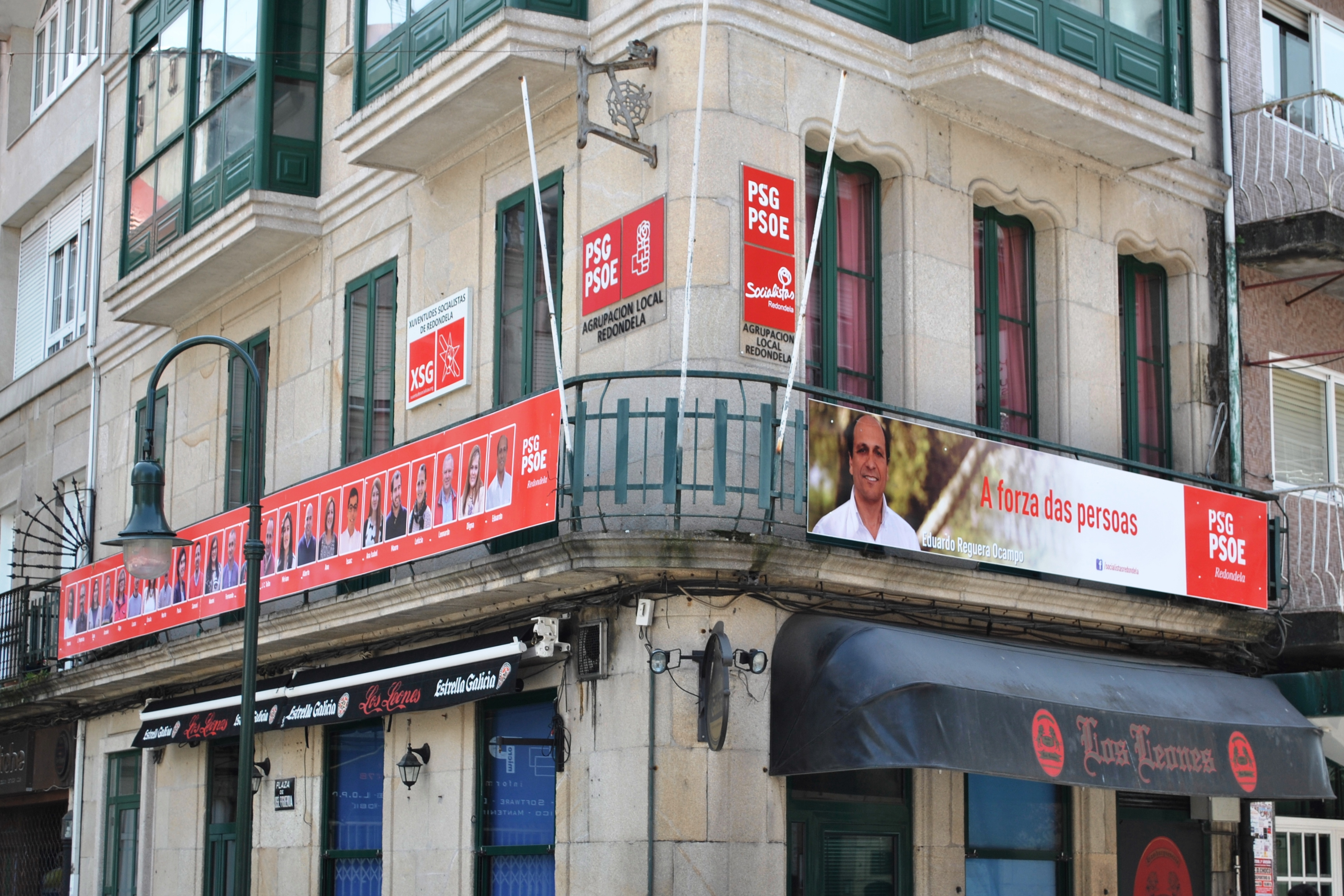
PSdeG local chapter in Redondela.

The Socialists' Party of Galicia (PSdeG–PSOE; Galician: Partido dos Socialistas de Galicia, Spanish: Partido de los Socialistas de Galicia) is a centre-left political party in Galicia, Spain. It is the Galician affiliate of the Spanish Socialist Workers' Party (PSOE). It defines itself as a Galicianist, social-democratic party.

== Electoral performance ==
=== Parliament of Galicia ===
Parliament of Galicia
Election	Votes	%	#	Seats	+/–	Leading candidate	Status in legislature
1981	193,456	19.62%	3rd	16 / 71	—	Francisco Vázquez	Opposition
1985	361,946	28.67%	2nd	22 / 71	6	Fernando González Laxe	Opposition (1985–1987)
1985	361,946	28.67%	2nd	22 / 71	6	Fernando González Laxe	Coalition (1987–1990)
1989	433,256	32.68%	2nd	28 / 75	6	Fernando González Laxe	Opposition
1993	346,831	23.68%	2nd	19 / 75	9	Antolín Sánchez	Opposition
1997 (Note: Electoral alliance with Left of Galicia and The Greens.)	310,508	19.46%	3rd	15 / 75	4	Abel Caballero	Opposition
2001	334,819	21.83%	3rd	17 / 75	2	Emilio Pérez Touriño	Opposition
2005	555,603	33.22%	2nd	25 / 75	8	Emilio Pérez Touriño	Coalition
2009	524,488	31.02%	2nd	25 / 75	0	Emilio Pérez Touriño	Opposition
2012	297,584	20.61%	2nd	18 / 75	7	Pachi Vázquez	Opposition
2016	256,381	17.87%	3rd	14 / 75	4	Xoaquín Fernández Leiceaga	Opposition
2020	252,537	19.38%	3rd	14 / 75	0	Gonzalo Caballero	Opposition
2024	207,691	14.04%	3rd	9 / 75	5	José Ramón Gómez Besteiro	Opposition

=== Cortes Generales ===
Cortes Generales
Election	Galicia						
Election	Congress					Senate	
Election	Votes	%	#	Seats	+/–	Seats	+/–
1977	175,127	15.52%	2nd	3 / 27	—	0 / 16	—
1979	177,298	17.32%	2nd	6 / 27	3	3 / 16	3
1982	426,469	32.83%	2nd	9 / 27	3	5 / 16	2
1986	458,376	35.76%	2nd	11 / 27	2	6 / 16	1
1989	459,750	34.56%	2nd	12 / 27	1	4 / 16	2
1993	569,899	35.95%	2nd	11 / 26	1	4 / 16	0
1996	574,491	33.54%	2nd	9 / 25	2	4 / 16	0
2000	389,999	23.71%	2nd	6 / 25	3	4 / 16	0
2004	682,684	37.19%	2nd	10 / 24	4	4 / 16	0
2008	750,492	40.64%	2nd	10 / 23	0	4 / 16	0
2011	457,633	27.81%	2nd	6 / 23	4	4 / 16	0
2015	350,220	21.33%	3rd	6 / 23	0	2 / 16	2
2016	348,014	22.21%	2nd	6 / 23	0	3 / 16	1
2019 (Apr)	528,195	32.09%	1st	10 / 23	4	8 / 16	5
2019 (Nov)	465,026	31.25%	2nd	10 / 23	0	5 / 16	3
2023	486,832	29.76%	2nd	7 / 23	3	6 / 19	1

=== European Parliament ===
European Parliament
Election	Galicia		
Election	Votes	%	#
1987	364,747	29.61%	2nd
1989	309,019	33.05%	2nd
1994	288,341	24.80%	2nd
1999	360,235	23.62%	2nd
2004	416,573	36.20%	2nd
2009	403,141	35.29%	2nd
2014	222,195	21.78%	2nd
2019	511,246	35.07%	1st
2024	303,689	26.96%	2nd

== Former logos ==
1981–2001
