= 2025 PP national party congress =

- 16 June 2025 (primary); 4−6 July 2025 (congress)

3,212 delegates in the National Congress Plurality of delegates needed to win
- Opinion polls
- Registered: 51,634 (primary)
- Turnout: 2,799 (87.1%) (congress)
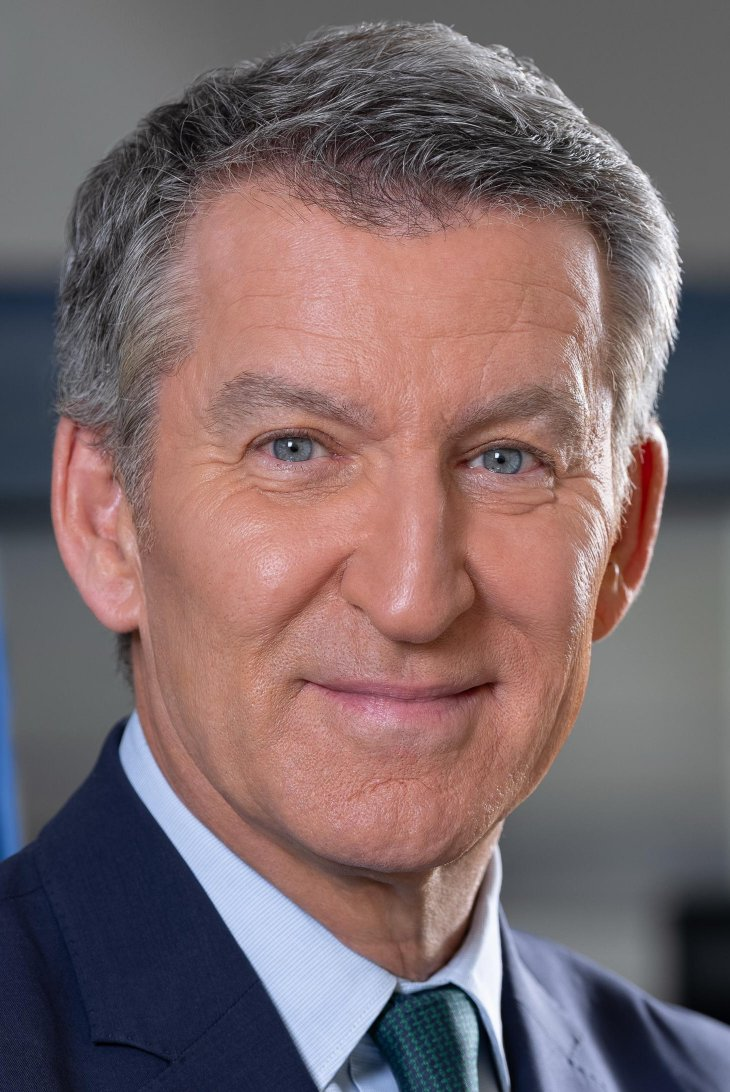

Candidate	Alberto Núñez Feijóo	Blank ballots
Popular vote	(99.7%)	(0.3%)
Delegate vote	2,760 (99.2%)	21 (0.8%)
Board	Unopposed	Unopposed
President before election
Alberto Núñez Feijóo
Elected President
Alberto Núñez Feijóo

The People's Party (PP) held its 21st national congress (of extraordinary nature) in Madrid from 4 to 6 July 2025, to renovate its governing bodies—including the post of president, which amounts to that of party leader—and establish the party platform and policy until the next congress.

The congress was scheduled to be held in 2026, but PP leader Alberto Núñez Feijóo surprisingly announced on 12 May 2025 that he would bring it forward to July that year in order to prepare the party for the next general election.

== Background ==
The election of Dolors Montserrat as the new secretary-general of the European People's Party (EPP) in April 2025, and the appointment of deputy secretary-general Esteban González Pons to replace her as head of the PP delegation in the European Parliament, was seen by some party sectors as an opportunity to make changes to the PP's national leadership in order to establish a more effective opposition to Prime Minister Pedro Sánchez; however, it was not expected that party leader Alberto Núñez Feijóo would change the date of the next congress, initially scheduled for April 2026.

On 8 May 2025, the Okdiario outlet published that Feijóo was considering bringing forward the congress to make sweeping changes in the party's leadership and prepare the PP in the event of a snap general election. This caused bewilderment among the PP ranks, as the decision was allegedly taken by a reduced group of confidants to Feijóo and there were no hints of what changes would be made. On 12 May, Madrilenian president Isabel Díaz Ayuso voiced her support for an early congress call commenting that "when there is a buzz, it is advisable" to put an end to the rumors. That same day, Feijóo confirmed that he would be calling the congress for July 2025, justifying it out of the need to "be prepared" ahead of future elections. It later transpired that Feijóo had been planning to advance the congress for some time, as some logistics were already underway since at least March 2025.

== Overview ==
=== Role ===
The national congress of the PP was the party's highest decision-making body, having the power to define its platform and policy, amend its statutes and internal regulations and elect its national governing bodies, which included the executive committee (responsible for the party's day-to-day management under the coordination of a president, which was the party leader) and 30 members in the board of directors (made up of party notables and elected representatives, which was the PP's highest body between congresses).

Depending on whether a congress was held following the natural end of its term or due to any other exceptional circumstances, it could be of either ordinary or extraordinary nature. Ordinary congresses were to be held every four years and called at least two months in advance—though they could be postponed by the board of directors for up to 12 additional months in the event of coincidence with parliamentary elections—whereas extraordinary congresses could be called at least one-and-a-half month in advance by a two-thirds majority of the board of directors, though in cases of "exceptional urgency" this timetable could be reduced to 30 days.

=== Procedure ===
Decisions at PP party congresses were adopted through delegate voting. Congress delegates were either ex officio (comprising all members of the board of directors and up to 10 members of the congress's organizing committee) or elected in local assemblies by party members registered to vote, using open list proportional representation, in a number at least four times as numerous as ex officio delegates. Elected delegates were distributed—either by the board of directors or by the organizing committee—among the party's regional branches, reserving at least 75 percent based on the number of members, and a maximum of 25 percent based on the vote share obtained in the immediately preceding general election; New Generations—the PP's youth wing—was entitled to a number of congress delegates proportional to its membership, elected at their own assemblies.

The election of the president was on the basis of a two-round system; if no candidate met the requirements for winning outright in the first round's primary election (securing over 50 percent of the votes overall, being the most voted candidate in at least half of the constituencies—60, corresponding to each province and island of Spain—and at least a 15-percentage point advantage over the runner-up), a second round would be held during the congress between the two candidates receiving the most votes. Voting for the first round comprised all members in good standing and registered to vote, whereas voting for the second round comprised all congress delegates. Candidates seeking to run were required to collect the endorsements of at least 100 members.

=== Timetable ===
The key dates of the congress process are listed below (all times are CEST):

- 19 May: Official announcement of the congress; start of participant submission period.
- President primaries:
  - 26 May: Start of pre-candidacy submission period.
  - 28 May: End of pre-candidacy submission period (at 12 pm).
  - 29 May: Proclamation of candidates.
  - 30 May: Official start of internal electoral campaign.
  - 15 June: Last day of internal electoral campaign.
  - 16 June: Primary election.
- Congress delegate elections:
  - 19 May: Start of candidacy submission periods.
  - 10 June: End of candidacy submission period.
  - 16 June: Election of congress delegates.
- 3 June: End of participant submission period.
- 4 July: Start of national congress.

== Candidates ==
Candidate	Notable positions	Announced	Ref.
=== Proclaimed ===
Candidates who met endorsement requirements and were officially proclaimed to contest the party congress.
Alberto Núñez Feijóo (age 65)	Member of the Congress of Deputies for Madrid (since 2023); President of the PP (since 2022); Leader of the Opposition of Spain (since 2022); Senator appointed by the Parliament of Galicia (2022–2023); President of the Regional Government of Galicia (2009–2022); President of the PP of Galicia (2006–2022); Member of the Parliament of Galicia for Pontevedra (2005–2022); First Vice President of the Xunta de Galicia (2004–2005); Minister of Territorial Policy, Public Works and Housing of Galicia (2003–2005); President of the State Society of Mail and Telegraphs (2000–2003); Secretary-General for Healthcare of Spain (1996–2000)	12 May 2025	
=== Withdrawn ===
Candidates who announced an intention to run, but subsequently withdrew.
José Luis Bayo (age 47)	President of NNGG in the Valencian Community (2000–2008)	20 May 2025	

=== Potential ===
The individuals in this section were the subject of speculation about their possible candidacy:

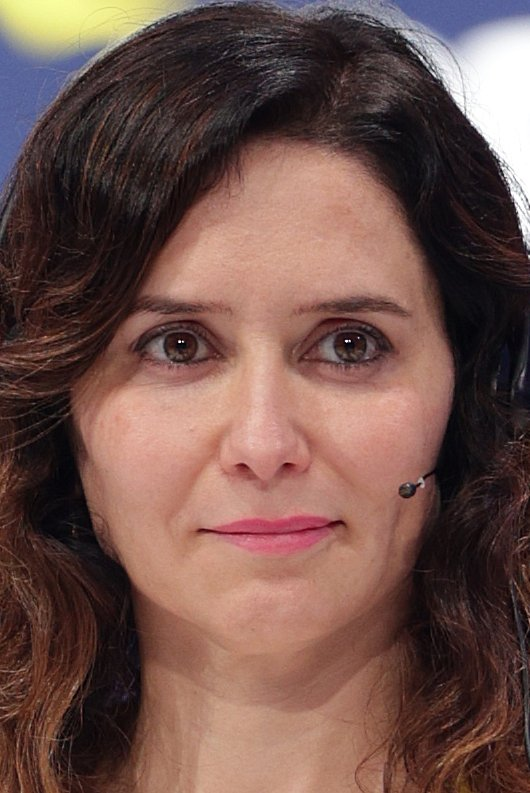
Isabel Díaz Ayuso

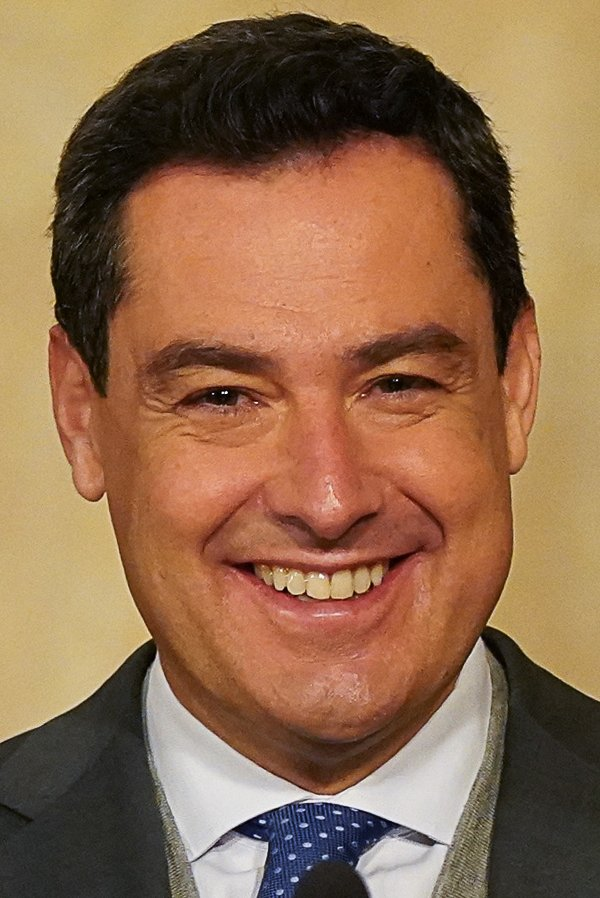
Juanma Moreno
- Isabel Díaz Ayuso (age 48) — President of the PP of the Community of Madrid (since 2022); President of the Community of Madrid (since 2019); Member of the Assembly of Madrid (2011–2017 and since 2019); Spokesperson of the People's Group in the Assembly of Madrid (2019); Deputy Minister of the Presidency and Justice of the Community of Madrid (2017–2018).
- Juanma Moreno (age 56) — President of the Regional Government of Andalusia (since 2019); Member of the Parliament of Andalusia for Málaga (1996–2000 and since 2015); President of the PP of Andalusia (since 2014); Senator appointed by the Parliament of Andalusia (2014–2017); Secretary of State of Social Services and Equality of Spain (2011–2014); Coordinator of Regional and Local Policy of the PP (2008–2012); Member of the Congress of Deputies for Málaga (2007–2011); Member of the Congress of Deputies for Cantabria (2000–2004); President of NNGG (1997–2001); City Councillor of Málaga (1995–1997).

== Endorsements ==
Candidates seeking to run were required to collect the endorsements of at least 100 party members.

Summary of candidate endorsement results
Candidate	Count	% V
Alberto Núñez Feijóo	94,501	100.00
Total	94,501	

== Opinion polls ==
Poll results are listed in the tables below in reverse chronological order, showing the most recent first, and using the date the survey's fieldwork was done, as opposed to the date of publication. If such date is unknown, the date of publication is given instead. The highest percentage figure in each polling survey is displayed in bold, and the background shaded in the candidate's colour. In the instance of a tie, the figures with the highest percentages are shaded. Polls show data gathered among PP voters/supporters as well as Spanish voters as a whole, but not among party members, who are the ones ultimately entitled to vote in the primary election.

=== PP voters ===
Polling firm/Commissioner	Fieldwork date	Sample size				Other /None	Question	Lead
Polling firm/Commissioner	Fieldwork date	Sample size	Feijóo (Inc.)	Ayuso	Moreno	Other /None	Question	Lead
40dB/Prisa	29 Sept–2 Oct 2023	462	**45.3**	43.8	10.9	–	–	1.5
EM-Analytics/Electomanía	24–25 Jul 2023	?	–	**71.1**	20.6	8.3	–	50.5
Invymark/laSexta	14–18 Nov 2022	?	**57.8**	41.3	–	–	0.9	16.5

=== Spanish voters ===
Polling firm/Commissioner	Fieldwork date	Sample size				Other /None	Question	Lead
Polling firm/Commissioner	Fieldwork date	Sample size	Feijóo (Inc.)	Ayuso	Moreno	Other /None	Question	Lead
40dB/Prisa	29 Sept–2 Oct 2023	2,000	30.2	**38.6**	31.2	–	–	7.4
EM-Analytics/Electomanía	24–25 Jul 2023	1,517	–	**52.7**	29.8	17.5	–	22.9
Invymark/laSexta	14–18 Nov 2022	?	**56.7**	31.6	–	–	11.7	25.1

== Results ==
=== Primary ===
Summary of the 16 June 2025 PP primary results
Candidate	Votes	%
Alberto Núñez Feijóo		99.72
Blank ballots		0.28
Total		
Valid votes		
Invalid votes		
Votes cast / turnout		
Abstentions		
Registered members	51,634	

Vote by party members
Feijóo	99.72%
Blank ballots	0.28%

=== Congress ===
Summary of the 4−6 July 2025 PP congress results
Candidate	Executive		Board	
Candidate	Votes	%	Votes	%
Alberto Núñez Feijóo	2,760	99.24	Unopposed	
Blank ballots	21	0.76	—N/a	
Total	2,781		—N/a	
Valid votes	2,781	99.36	—N/a	
Invalid votes	18	0.64	—N/a	
Votes cast / turnout	2,799	87.14	—N/a	
Abstentions	413	12.86	—N/a	
Total delegates	3,212		3,212	

== Bibliography ==
- Estatutos Nacionales (18 Congreso) (PDF) (Party Statutes). People's Party (in Spanish). 12 February 2017. Archived from the original (PDF) on 2025-02-07.
- Reglamento Marco de Congresos (PDF) (Party Regulation). People's Party (in Spanish). 4 September 2017 [version as of 28 May 2018].
