= 2022 PP national party congress =

- 21 March 2022 (primary); 1−2 April 2022 (congress)

3,111 delegates in the National Congress Plurality of delegates needed to win
- Opinion polls
- Registered: 41,991 (primary)
- Turnout: 36,974 (88.1%) (primary); 2,670 (85.8%) (congress)
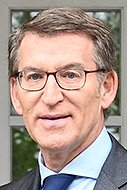

Candidate	Alberto Núñez Feijóo	Blank ballots
Popular vote	36,781 (99.6%)	137 (0.4%)
Delegate vote	2,619 (98.3%)	44 (1.7%)
Board	Unopposed	Unopposed
President before election
Pablo Casado
Elected President
Alberto Núñez Feijóo

The People's Party (PP) held its 20th national congress (of extraordinary nature) in Seville from 1 to 2 April 2022, to renovate its governing bodies—including the post of president, which amounted to that of party leader. A primary election to elect the new party president was held on 21 March. The congress was called following the forced ousting of both Pablo Casado as president and Teodoro García Egea as secretary-general in the aftermath of a major crisis that ravaged the party from 16 to 23 February. Galician president Alberto Núñez Feijóo became the party's new president.

Following her landslide victory in the 4 May 2021 regional election, Madrilenian president Isabel Díaz Ayuso came to be increasingly seen by some within the party as a better leader than Casado to face off Prime Minister Pedro Sánchez in the next Spanish general election. A conflict started from September 2021 onwards when Ayuso rushed for the control of the party's regional branch in the Community of Madrid, with such a move being seen by Casado's supporters as an immediate threat to his national leadership. Following several months of a poor and erratic leadership on Casado's behalf and a disappointing party result in the self-imposed 2022 Castilian-Leonese regional election, the crisis entered a new stage on 16 February 2022 when some media revealed an alleged plot of García Egea's allies to investigate Ayuso's family in search of compromising material—more specifically, alleged influence peddling in the awarding of public contracts to Ayuso's brother. After several days of public infighting between both Casado and Ayuso, Feijóo was reported as having agreed with the latter and other party regional presidents to become the party's new leader and replace Casado, whose incoming resignation and that of García Egea were announced on 22 February after they were publicly abandoned by most of their party's colleagues.

The congress slogan was "Lo haremos bien" (Spanish: We will get it right). On 18 March 2022, it was announced that 41,681 PP members had registered to vote in the primary election scheduled for 21 March.

== Overview ==
The congress of the PP was the party's supreme body, and could be of either ordinary or extraordinary nature, depending on whether it was held following the natural end of its term or due to any other exceptional circumstances not linked to this event. Ordinary congresses were to be held every four years and called at least two months in advance of their celebration, though this timetable could be altered for up to twelve months in the event of coincidence with electoral processes. Extraordinary congresses had to be called by a two-thirds majority of the Board of Directors at least one-and-a-half month in advance of their celebration, though in cases of "exceptional urgency" this deadline could be reduced to 30 days.

The president of the PP was the party's head and the person holding the party's political and legal representation, and presided over its board of directors and executive committee, which were the party's maximum directive, governing and administration bodies between congresses.

=== Electoral system ===
The election of the PP president was based on a two-round system. Any party member with at least one-year membership was eligible for the post of party president, on the condition that they were up-to-date with the payment of party fees and that they were able to secure the signed endorsements of at least 100 party members. The election was to be held in the party's 60 constituencies, corresponding to each province and island of Spain.

In the first round, all registered party members who had their payment fees up to date were allowed to vote for any of the candidates who had been officially proclaimed by virtue of securing the required number of signatures to run. In the event that no candidate won the first round outright—which required securing at least 50 percent of the national vote, being the most voted candidate in at least half of the constituencies and at least a 15-percentage point advantage over the runner-up—a second round would be held concurrently with the party congress, in which party delegates would elect the new party leader from among the two candidates who had previously received the most votes in the first round. Most of the delegates were to be elected by party members concurrently with the first round of voting to the party leadership.

== Timetable ==
The key dates are listed below (all times are CET. Note that the Canary Islands use WET (UTC+0) instead):

- 1 March: Official announcement of the congress. Start of application period for party members to register in order to participate in the leadership election.
- 8 March: Start of candidate submission period at 12 am.
- 9 March: End of candidate submission period at 8 pm.
- 10 March: Proclamation of candidates to the party presidency.
- 11 March: Official start of internal electoral campaigning.
- 16 March: Deadline for party members to register for voting at 2 pm.
- 16 March: Deadline for party members to apply for delegates at 2 pm.
- 20 March: Last day of internal electoral campaigning.
- 21 March: Primary election (first round of voting, with all registered party members entitled to vote for the proclaimed candidates) and election of congress delegates.
- 1−2 April: Party congress (if needed, a run-off voting was to be held among delegates to elect the party leader among the two most voted candidates in the first round).

== Candidates ==
Candidate	Notable positions	Announced	Campaign	Ref.
=== Proclaimed ===
Candidates who met endorsement requirements and were officially proclaimed to contest the party congress.
Alberto Núñez Feijóo (age 60)	President of the Regional Government of Galicia (since 2009); President of the PP of Galicia (since 2006); Member of the Parliament of Galicia for Pontevedra (since 2005); First Vice President of the Xunta de Galicia (2004–2005); Minister of Territorial Policy, Public Works and Housing of Galicia (2003–2005); President of the State Society of Mail and Telegraphs (2000–2003); Secretary-General for Healthcare of Spain (1996–2000)	2 March 2022		
=== Failed to qualify ===
Candidates who announced an intention to run, but failed to qualify due to not meeting endorsement requirements.
Alexia Herranz (age 29)	None	2 March 2022		

=== Declined ===
The individuals in this section were the subject of speculation about their possible candidacy, but publicly denied or recanted interest in running:

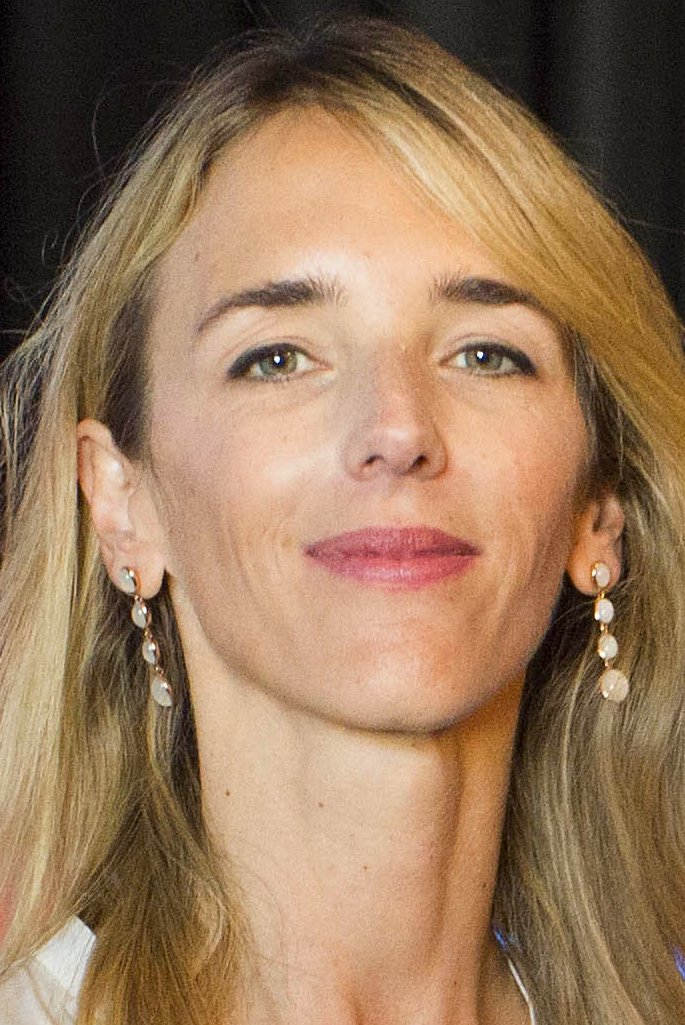
Cayetana Álvarez de Toledo

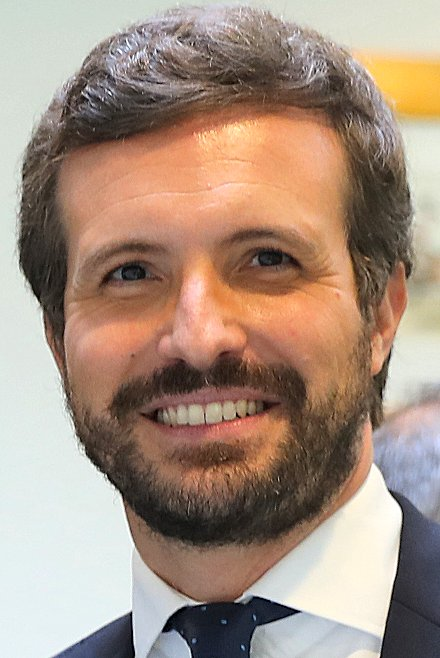
Pablo Casado

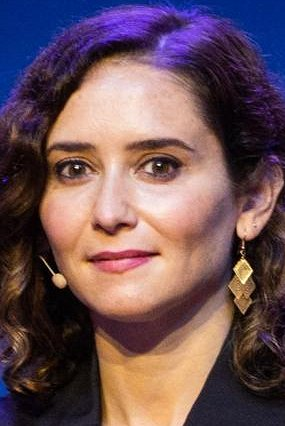
Isabel Díaz Ayuso

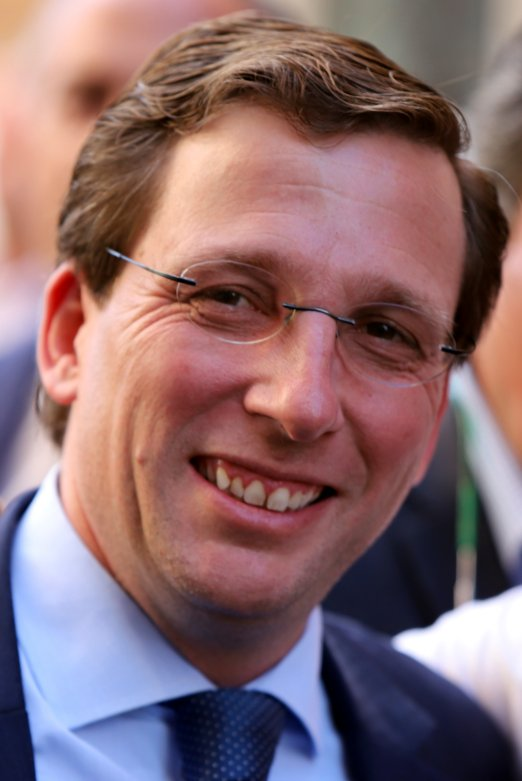
José Luis Martínez-Almeida

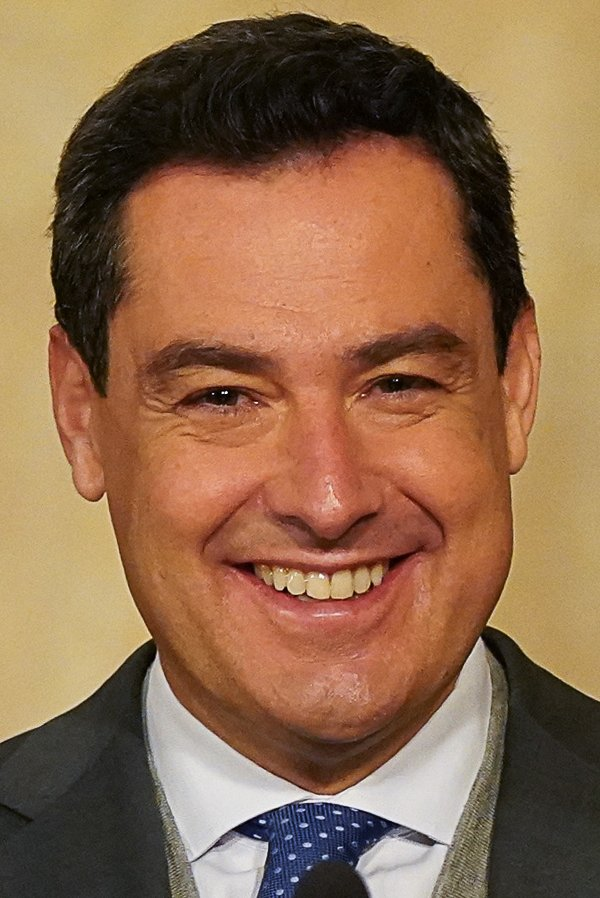
Juanma Moreno
- Cayetana Álvarez de Toledo (age 47) — Member of the Congress of Deputies for Madrid (2008–2015 and since 2023); Member of the Congress of Deputies for Barcelona (2019–2023); Spokesperson of the People's Parliamentary Group in the Congress (2019–2020).
- Pablo Casado (age 41) — Member of the Congress of Deputies for Madrid (since 2019); President of the PP (since 2018); Leader of the Opposition of Spain (since 2018); Member of the Congress of Deputies for Ávila (2011–2019); Deputy Secretary-General of Communication of the PP (2015–2018); President of NNGG in the Community of Madrid (2005–2013); Member of the Assembly of Madrid (2007–2009).
- Isabel Díaz Ayuso (age 43) — President of the Community of Madrid (since 2019); Member of the Assembly of Madrid (2011–2017 and since 2019); Spokesperson of the People's Group in the Assembly of Madrid (2019); Deputy Minister of the Presidency and Justice of the Community of Madrid (2017–2018).
- José Luis Martínez-Almeida (age 46) — Mayor of Madrid (since 2019); City Councillor of Madrid (since 2015); National Spokesperson of the PP (2020–2022); Spokesperson of the People's Group in Madrid (2017–2019); Director-General of Artistic Heritage of the Community of Madrid (2007–2011).
- Juanma Moreno (age 51) — President of the Regional Government of Andalusia (since 2019); Member of the Parliament of Andalusia for Málaga (1996–2000 and since 2015); President of the PP of Andalusia (since 2014); Senator appointed by the Parliament of Andalusia (2014–2017); Secretary of State of Social Services and Equality of Spain (2011–2014); Coordinator of Regional and Local Policy of the PP (2008–2012); Member of the Congress of Deputies for Málaga (2007–2011); Member of the Congress of Deputies for Cantabria (2000–2004); President of NNGG (1997–2001); City Councillor of Málaga (1995–1997).

== Endorsements ==
Candidates seeking to run were required to collect the endorsements of at least 100 party members.

Summary of candidate endorsement results
Candidate	Count	% V
Alberto Núñez Feijóo	55,580	99.93
Alexia Herranz	41	0.07
Total	55,621	

Endorsements by party members
Feijóo	99.93%
Herranz	0.07%

== Opinion polls ==
Poll results are listed in the tables below in reverse chronological order, showing the most recent first, and using the date the survey's fieldwork was done, as opposed to the date of publication. If such date is unknown, the date of publication is given instead. The highest percentage figure in each polling survey is displayed in bold, and the background shaded in the candidate's colour. In the instance of a tie, the figures with the highest percentages are shaded. Polls show data gathered among PP voters/supporters as well as Spanish voters as a whole, but not among party members, who were the ones ultimately entitled to vote in the primary election.

=== PP voters ===
Polling firm/Commissioner	Fieldwork date	Sample size								Other /None	Question	Lead
Polling firm/Commissioner	Fieldwork date	Sample size	Casado (Inc.)	Feijóo	Ayuso	Moreno	Almeida	Mañueco	Álvarez de Toledo	Other /None	Question	Lead
**Primary election**	21 Mar 2022	—N/a (Note: PP members.)	–	**99.6**	–	–	–	–	–	0.4	—N/a	99.2
Hamalgama Métrica/Vozpópuli	3–9 Mar 2022	?	6.5	**54.5**	26.0	10.4	–	–	–	1.3	1.3	28.5
Simple Lógica/elDiario.es	1–9 Mar 2022	?	–	**54.4**	29.2	–	–	–	–	4.0	14.9	25.2
Sigma Dos/Antena 3	2 Mar 2022	?	4.8	**60.9**	26.2	–	–	–	–	8.1		34.7
Target Point/El Debate	23–25 Feb 2022	?	4.0	**53.0**	32.0	2.0	3.0	–	–	1.0	6.0	21.0
SocioMétrica/El Español	21–25 Feb 2022	?	–	**48.3**	37.3	3.9	5.6	0.2	–	4.7		11.0
GAD3/ABC	23–24 Feb 2022	?	8.0	**50.0**	36.0	4.0	–	–	–	–	1.0	14.0
IMOP/El Confidencial	19 Feb 2022	?	14.5	–	**71.1**	–	–	–	–	12.9	1.4	56.6
Data10/Okdiario	18 Feb 2022	1,000	19.2	**43.2**	24.4	3.1	3.5	–	2.6	–	4.0	18.8
EM-Analytics/Electomanía	17 Feb 2022	?	7.3	13.5	**72.8**	–	–	–	4.9	1.6	–	65.5
Simple Lógica/elDiario.es	3–13 Jan 2022	?	28.0	–	**63.3**	–	–	–	–	7.7	1.0	35.3
SocioMétrica/El Español	20–30 Dec 2021	?	24.4	18.0	**43.8**	3.9	8.0	0.8	–	1.1		19.4
SW Demoscopia/Publicaciones Sur	23–24 Nov 2021	? (Note: Right-wing voters.)	14.5	–	**76.1**	–	–	–	–	9.4	–	61.6
EM-Analytics/Electomanía	1–8 Oct 2021	?	30.3	–	**66.5**	–	–	–	–	–	3.2	36.2
NC Report/La Razón	21–23 Jul 2021	500	**51.8**	–	39.8	–	–	–	–	–	8.4	12.0

=== Spanish voters ===
Polling firm/Commissioner	Fieldwork date	Sample size								Other /None	Question	Lead
Polling firm/Commissioner	Fieldwork date	Sample size	Casado (Inc.)	Feijóo	Ayuso	Moreno	Almeida	Mañueco	Álvarez de Toledo	Other /None	Question	Lead
Hamalgama Métrica/Vozpópuli	3–9 Mar 2022	1,000	3.3	**49.3**	38.4	6.0	–	–	–	1.4	1.6	10.9
Simple Lógica/elDiario.es	1–9 Mar 2022	1,064	–	**35.7**	15.5	–	–	–	–	43.4		20.2
Sigma Dos/Antena 3	2 Mar 2022	?	6.5	**37.9**	22.1	–	–	–	–	6.6	26.9	15.8
Target Point/El Debate	23–25 Feb 2022	1,005	2.7	**32.6**	22.3	3.0	2.9	–	–	29.4	7.0	10.3
SocioMétrica/El Español	21–25 Feb 2022	3,759	–	**44.0**	29.1	5.8	5.8	0.6	–	14.8		14.9
GAD3/ABC	23–24 Feb 2022	800	8.0	**35.6**	22.1	8.5	–	–	–	–	25.7	13.5
EM-Analytics/Electomanía	17 Feb 2022	2,742	7.6	39.0	**39.4**	–	–	–	5.8	8.2	–	0.4
Simple Lógica/elDiario.es	3–13 Jan 2022	1,039	21.1	–	**39.6**	–	–	–	–	31.9	7.4	18.5
SocioMétrica/El Español	20–30 Dec 2021	3,000	8.2	27.8	**38.0**	5.4	8.1	0.5	–	12.0		10.2
SW Demoscopia/Publicaciones Sur	23–24 Nov 2021	610	14.7	–	**42.3**	–	–	–	–	43.0	–	27.6
EM-Analytics/Electomanía	1–8 Oct 2021	2,119	36.7	–	**48.0**	–	–	–	–	–	15.3	11.3

== Results ==
=== Primary ===
Summary of the 21 March 2022 PP primary results
Candidate	Votes	%
Alberto Núñez Feijóo	36,781	99.63
Blank ballots	137	0.37
Total	36,918	
Valid votes	36,918	99.15
Invalid votes	56	0.15
Votes cast / turnout	36,974	88.05
Abstentions	5,017	11.95
Registered members	41,991	

Vote by party members
Feijóo	99.63%
Blank ballots	0.37%

=== Congress ===
Summary of the 2 April 2022 PP congress results
Candidate	Executive		Board	
Candidate	Votes	%	Votes	%
Alberto Núñez Feijóo	2,619	98.35	Unopposed	
Blank ballots	44	1.65	—N/a	
Total	2,663		—N/a	
Valid votes	2,663	99.74	—N/a	
Invalid votes	7	0.26	—N/a	
Votes cast / turnout	2,670	85.82	—N/a	
Abstentions	441	14.18	—N/a	
Total delegates	3,111		3,111	

Vote by delegates (Executive)
Feijóo	98.35%
Blank ballots	1.65%
