= Rafael Rubio Núñez =

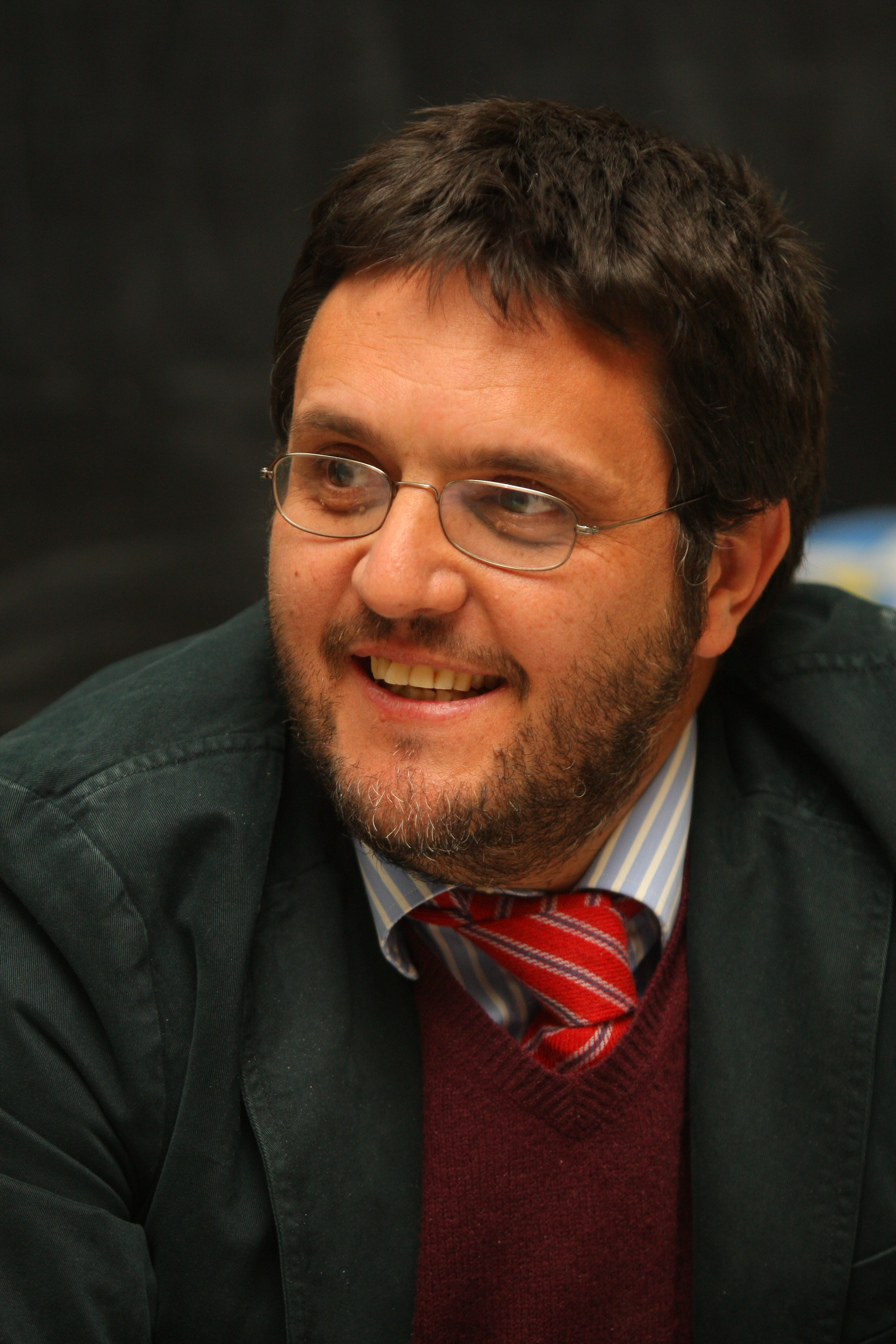
- Occupations: Jurist; Academic; Political consultant

Academic background
- Education: Complutense University of Madrid
- Thesis: 'Las posibilidades de legislar los grupos de presión en España' (2001)

Academic work
- Discipline: Constitutional law
- Sub-discipline: Electoral law, parliamentary law, lobbying regulation, technology and democracy
- Institutions: Complutense University of Madrid
- Website: rafarubio.es

Rafael Rubio Núñez is a Spanish jurist and academic specialising in constitutional law. He is a tenured professor of constitutional law at the Complutense University of Madrid (UCM), where he directs the research group on technology and democracy (i+dem). His academic work centres on electoral law, parliamentary law, the regulation of lobbying, transparency and open government, and the impact of technology on democratic participation and fundamental rights.

Alongside his academic career, Rubio has worked as a political and communications consultant. In that role he advised electoral campaigns of the People's Party (PP), including those of Mariano Rajoy and, later, Pablo Casado, whom Spanish media described as one of his closest strategists. He has also held a number of public and institutional advisory positions, including deputy director of the Centre for Political and Constitutional Studies (CEPC) and membership of bodies such as the Council of Europe's Venice Commission and the Open Government Forum of the Government of Spain.

== Academic career ==
Rubio earned a doctorate in constitutional law from the Complutense University of Madrid, for which he received the university's extraordinary doctorate prize (premio extraordinario); his 2001 thesis examined the legal regulation of interest groups in Spain. At the Complutense he is a tenured professor (profesor titular), subsequently accredited to the rank of full professor (catedrático), and directs the i+dem research group on technology and democracy.

He has been a visiting researcher at Georgetown University, Harvard University, George Washington University, the Sant'Anna School of Advanced Studies in Italy, and Dublin City University, and has taught postgraduate courses at universities in Europe and the Americas. His research output includes monographs, edited volumes and numerous academic articles and book chapters on political participation, parliaments, electoral processes, political communication and lobbying.

== Public and institutional roles ==
Rubio served as deputy director of the Centre for Political and Constitutional Studies, attached to the Ministry of the Presidency, between 2017 and 2018. He has been a member of the Open Government Forum of the Government of Spain and a substitute member of the European Commission for Democracy through Law (the Venice Commission), the Council of Europe's advisory body on constitutional matters; in that context he took part as a legal adviser in the Council of Europe's electoral observation mission for the 2019 Ukrainian presidential election. He also presided over the Transparency and Participation Council of the Community of Madrid between 2020 and 2024.

As a consultant on technology, democracy and transparency, he has advised public institutions including the Inter-American Development Bank, the Ministry of Foreign Affairs of Peru and regional governments in Spain.

== Political consulting ==
Outside the public and academic spheres, Rubio has worked as a political and communications consultant. According to professional profiles he has advised numerous electoral campaigns in Spain and Latin America. His best-documented work is for the People's Party: Spanish media identified him as a strategist for the campaigns of Mariano Rajoy and, in 2019, as a close adviser to party leader Pablo Casado, comparing his role to that played by Iván Redondo for Pedro Sánchez.

== Selected works ==
- Los grupos de presión (Centro de Estudios Constitucionales, 2003) ISBN 9788425912559
- Regreso a Barataria (Aduana Vieja, 2006) ISBN 9788493058067
- Así fue la JMJ y así se la contamos (with María José Abad and Yago de la Cierva; EUNSA, 2013)
- El parlamento abierto en el mundo. Evolución y buenas prácticas (with Ricardo Vela; Fundación Giménez Abad, 2017)
- La administración consultiva como herramienta de participación (Centro de Estudios Políticos y Constitucionales, 2020)

== Honours ==
- Extraordinary doctorate prize, Complutense University of Madrid (2001)
- Commander with Star of the Order of St. Sylvester (2012)
- Cross of the Order of St. Raymond of Penyafort (2016)
