= Leadership opinion polling for the April 2019 Spanish general election =

In the run up to the April 2019 Spanish general election, various organisations carried out opinion polling to gauge the opinions that voters hold towards political leaders. Results of such polls are displayed in this article. The date range for these opinion polls is from the previous general election, held on 26 June 2016, to the day the next election was held, on 28 April 2019.

== Preferred prime minister ==
The table below lists opinion polling on leader preferences to become prime minister.

Polling firm/Commissioner	Fieldwork date	Sample size								Other/ None/ Not care	Question	Lead
Polling firm/Commissioner	Fieldwork date	Sample size	Rajoy PP	Casado PP	Sánchez PSOE	Iglesias Podemos	Rivera Cs	Garzón IU	Abascal Vox	Other/ None/ Not care	Question	Lead
CIS	21 Mar–23 Apr 2019	17,641	–	10.8	28.7	7.3	12.1	3.5	3.7	22.1	11.8	16.6
InvyMark/laSexta	15–19 Apr 2019	?	–	22.9	37.1	12.1	13.6	–	4.3	–	10.0	14.2
GAD3/La Vanguardia	9–11 Apr 2019	1,800	–	13.3	35.7	9.4	11.6	–	7.6	–	22.4	22.4
InvyMark/laSexta	8–11 Apr 2019	?	–	22.7	37.3	13.0	13.5	–	5.1	–	8.4	14.6
GESOP/El Periódico	1–5 Apr 2019	1,500	–	12.1	32.0	13.7	19.5	–	4.7	9.2	8.8	12.5
GAD3/ABC	26 Mar–4 Apr 2019	4,000	–	16.8	30.9	6.6	15.5	–	6.1	–	24.0	14.1
IMOP/El Confidencial	24–30 Mar 2019	1,419	–	13.8	30.6	10.4	20.3	–	4.4	20.5		10.3
InvyMark/laSexta	25–29 Mar 2019	?	–	22.1	36.8	13.1	14.3	–	3.8	–	9.9	18.7
IMOP/El Confidencial	20–26 Mar 2019	1,400	–	11.5	33.0	10.0	22.3	–	3.8	19.4		10.7
Metroscopia/Henneo	18–25 Mar 2019	2,722	–	13.0	31.0	12.0	21.0	–	6.0	11.0	6.0	10.0
IMOP/El Confidencial	17–23 Mar 2019	1,399	–	10.1	34.6	11.8	20.0	–	3.7	19.8		14.6
CIS	1–18 Mar 2019	16,194	–	10.9	28.8	6.2	13.2	4.5	3.6	20.2	12.5	15.6
InvyMark/laSexta	4–8 Mar 2019	?	–	20.7	39.4	9.6	14.9	–	3.5	–	11.9	18.7
GESOP/El Periódico	13–15 Feb 2019	1,000	–	14.3	29.3	10.9	18.0	–	5.2	15.7	6.6	11.3
GAD3/La Vanguardia	12–15 Feb 2019	1,200	–	13.1	26.0	4.8	9.7	–	4.6	33.9	7.7	12.9
CIS	1–10 Feb 2019	2,964	–	11.5	26.5	7.5	12.6	–	1.5	29.4	11.0	13.9
InvyMark/laSexta	14–18 Jan 2019	?	–	29.5	29.7	14.8	17.2	–	–	–	8.8	0.2
CIS	1–13 Jan 2019	2,989	–	10.9	26.8	8.9	15.3	–	1.0	27.6	9.4	11.5
SocioMétrica/El Español	24–31 Dec 2018	1,800	–	14.4	17.7	12.8	17.8	–	9.3	28.0		0.1
InvyMark/laSexta	17–21 Dec 2018	?	–	17.3	36.2	16.8	20.0	–	–	–	9.7	16.2
IMOP/El Confidencial	10–13 Dec 2018	1,036	–	11.4	31.5	13.7	20.5	–	4.9	15.8	2.0	11.0
CIS	1–12 Dec 2018	2,984	–	13.1	24.1	9.8	14.9	0.5	0.9	24.4	12.1	9.2
GAD3/La Vanguardia	2–7 Nov 2018	1,208	–	9.8	26.8	7.8	19.8	–	–	32.5	3.3	7.0
CIS	1–9 Oct 2018	2,973	–	10.8	25.8	10.6	16.9	1.4	–	24.5	10.1	8.9
IMOP/El Confidencial	6–11 Sep 2018	1,012	–	10.5	24.2	12.7	23.2	–	–	29.4		1.0
IMOP/El Confidencial	23–28 May 2018	1,015	11.8	–	17.7	10.1	29.6	10.7	–	20.1		11.9
SocioMétrica/El Español	17–26 May 2018	1,700	9.0	–	11.0	10.0	30.0	15.0	–	26.0		15.0
GESOP/El Periódico	12–18 Apr 2018	1,000	14.1	–	17.4	17.0	28.0	–	–	19.4	3.9	10.6
SocioMétrica/El Español	19–29 Mar 2018	1,000	10.0	–	12.0	9.0	31.0	10.0	–	28.0		19.0
GAD3/La Vanguardia	12–14 Mar 2018	1,008	14.8	–	13.2	11.8	24.8	–	–	22.8	12.6	10.0
IMOP/El Confidencial	22–27 Feb 2018	1,402	13.0	–	13.1	7.5	28.0	–	–	38.4		14.9
MyWord/Cadena SER	30 May–1 Jun 2017	1,008	15.6	–	31.1	24.8	28.5	–	–	–	–	2.6
InvyMark/laSexta	27 Jun–1 Jul 2016	?	31.2	–	20.9	22.1	10.5	–	–	–	15.3	9.1

== Predicted prime minister ==
The table below lists opinion polling on the perceived likelihood for each leader to become prime minister.

Polling firm/Commissioner	Fieldwork date	Sample size					Other/ None/ Not care	Question	Lead
Polling firm/Commissioner	Fieldwork date	Sample size	Casado PP	Sánchez PSOE	Iglesias Podemos	Rivera Cs	Other/ None/ Not care	Question	Lead
InvyMark/laSexta	17–21 Dec 2018	?	23.3	42.0	3.8	16.8	–	14.8	18.7

== Leader ratings ==
The table below lists opinion polling on leader ratings, on a 0–10 scale: 0 would stand for a "terrible" rating, whereas 10 would stand for "excellent".

Polling firm/Commissioner	Fieldwork date	Sample size								
Polling firm/Commissioner	Fieldwork date	Sample size	Rajoy PP	Casado PP	Sánchez PSOE	Fernández PSOE	Iglesias UP	Garzón UP	Rivera Cs	Abascal Vox
Invymark/laSexta	15–19 Apr 2019	?	–	3.49	4.81	–	3.42	–	4.11	2.01
Sigma Dos/El Mundo	3–17 Apr 2019	8,000	–	3.8	4.8	–	3.7	3.8	4.4	2.9
InvyMark/laSexta	8–11 Apr 2019	?	–	3.45	4.86	–	3.64	–	4.21	2.14
CIS	1–18 Mar 2019	16,194	–	3.3	4.1	–	3.1	3.6	3.7	2.6
InvyMark/laSexta	4–8 Mar 2019	?	–	3.45	4.79	–	3.21	–	4.22	2.03
Sigma Dos/El Mundo	19–22 Feb 2019	1,200	–	3.61	4.36	–	3.24	3.59	4.14	2.91
InvyMark/laSexta	18–21 Feb 2019	?	–	3.40	4.73	–	3.35	–	4.06	2.14
GESOP/El Periódico	13–15 Feb 2019	1,000	–	3.6	4.2	–	3.5	–	4.2	2.9
GAD3/La Vanguardia	12–15 Feb 2019	1,200	–	3.5	3.8	–	3.0	–	3.9	2.6
CIS	1–10 Feb 2019	2,964	–	3.6	4.3	–	3.2	3.6	3.9	–
InvyMark/laSexta	28 Jan–1 Feb 2019	?	–	3.68	4.66	–	3.36	–	4.26	2.09
InvyMark/laSexta	14–18 Jan 2019	?	–	3.91	4.46	–	3.12	–	4.16	–
CIS	1–13 Jan 2019	2,989	–	2.9	3.8	–	2.8	3.6	3.5	–
Sigma Dos/El Mundo	21–27 Dec 2018	1,000	–	3.67	4.05	–	3.49	3.82	4.22	3.20
InvyMark/laSexta	17–21 Dec 2018	?	–	3.29	4.53	–	3.22	–	4.10	–
Sigma Dos/Antena 3	16 Dec 2018	1,000	–	3.65	4.17	–	3.27	–	4.14	2.65
CIS	1–12 Dec 2018	2,984	–	3.4	3.9	–	2.9	3.3	3.7	–
InvyMark/laSexta	3–7 Dec 2018	1,200	–	3.45	4.25	–	2.94	–	4.30	–
CIS	1–11 Nov 2018	2,974	–	3.0	3.9	–	3.0	3.6	3.5	–
InvyMark/laSexta	5–9 Nov 2018	?	–	3.10	4.28	–	3.21	–	3.68	–
GAD3/La Vanguardia	2–7 Nov 2018	1,208	–	3.4	4.3	–	3.1	–	4.0	–
GESOP/El Periódico	22–30 Oct 2018	911	–	3.38	4.42	–	3.70	–	4.14	–
InvyMark/laSexta	22–26 Oct 2018	?	–	3.08	4.63	–	3.48	–	3.60	–
CIS	1–9 Oct 2018	2,973	–	3.25	4.16	–	3.29	4.08	3.81	–
InvyMark/laSexta	10–14 Sep 2018	?	–	2.92	4.45	–	2.98	–	3.49	–
CIS	1–11 Sep 2018	2,972	–	3.56	4.11	–	3.07	3.79	3.93	–
InvyMark/laSexta	23–27 Jul 2018	?	3.95	3.67	4.56	–	2.73	–	3.77	–
InvyMark/laSexta	9–13 Jul 2018	?	3.49	–	4.71	–	2.80	–	3.66	–
Sigma Dos/El Mundo	9–12 Jul 2018	1,000	–	3.72	4.74	–	3.67	4.05	4.53	–
CIS	1–10 Jul 2018	2,485	2.83	–	4.04	–	2.96	3.98	3.35	–
InvyMark/laSexta	18–22 Jun 2018	?	3.60	–	4.82	–	2.91	–	3.59	–
GESOP/El Periódico	11–13 Jun 2018	800	–	–	4.9	–	–	–	4.3	–
InvyMark/laSexta	4–8 Jun 2018	?	4.10	–	4.76	–	2.96	–	4.12	–
GESOP/El Periódico	12–18 Apr 2018	1,000	3.2	–	4.1	–	3.5	–	4.6	–
InvyMark/laSexta	9–13 Apr 2018	?	3.39	–	3.94	–	2.86	–	4.21	–
CIS	1–10 Apr 2018	2,466	2.59	–	3.35	–	2.77	3.80	3.79	–
Sigma Dos/El Mundo	23–27 Mar 2018	1,000	3.66	–	3.67	–	3.05	3.67	4.37	–
InvyMark/laSexta	12–16 Mar 2018	?	3.07	–	3.92	–	2.71	–	4.06	–
InvyMark/laSexta	26 Feb–2 Mar 2018	?	2.97	–	4.05	–	2.69	–	4.07	–
IMOP/El Confidencial	22–27 Feb 2018	1,402	3.2	–	4.3	–	3.1	4.1	5.0	–
InvyMark/laSexta	12–16 Feb 2018	?	3.23	–	4.32	–	2.64	–	4.52	–
InvyMark/laSexta	22–26 Jan 2018	?	3.68	–	4.30	–	3.00	–	4.50	–
CIS	2–14 Jan 2018	2,477	2.87	–	3.68	–	2.54	3.67	4.01	–
CIS	2–11 Oct 2017	2,487	3.02	–	3.61	–	2.67	3.85	3.75	–
Sigma Dos/El Mundo	4–7 Sep 2017	1,000	4.09	–	4.28	–	3.36	3.53	4.18	–
CIS	1–10 Jul 2017	2,490	2.79	–	3.73	–	2.95	3.91	3.58	–
InvyMark/laSexta	26–30 Jun 2017	?	3.43	–	4.76	–	3.86	4.25	3.81	–
Sigma Dos/El Mundo	8–10 May 2017	1,200	3.86	–	4.32	–	3.37	3.72	4.36	–
CIS	1–8 Apr 2017	2,492	2.91	–	–	4.12	3.00	4.26	3.68	–
Sigma Dos/El Mundo	27 Feb–2 Mar 2017	1,000	3.82	–	–	3.85	3.45	3.76	4.18	–
GESOP/El Periódico	19–22 Feb 2017	1,000	3.34	–	4.12	–	3.61	–	4.50	–
CIS	2–12 Jan 2017	2,490	3.10	–	–	4.12	2.87	4.02	3.56	–
Sigma Dos/El Mundo	23–29 Dec 2016	1,000	4.34	–	–	4.13	3.37	3.94	4.50	–
CIS	1–10 Oct 2016	2,491	2.97	–	3.35	–	3.22	4.47	3.69	–
Metroscopia/El País	6–8 Sep 2016	1,294	3.9	–	3.9	–	3.7	–	5.3	–
CIS	1–11 Jul 2016	2,479	3.35	–	3.93	–	3.48	4.55	3.96	–

== Approval ratings ==
The tables below list the public approval ratings of the leaders and leading candidates of the main political parties in Spain.

=== Pedro Sánchez ===
Polling firm/Commissioner	Fieldwork date	Sample size	Pedro Sánchez (PSOE)			
Polling firm/Commissioner	Fieldwork date	Sample size	check	X mark	Question	Net
Metroscopia/Henneo	11–16 Apr 2019	4,775	46.0	52.0	2.0	−6.0
Simple Lógica	1–5 Apr 2019	1,054	36.5	54.8	8.7	−18.3
Metroscopia/Henneo	18–25 Mar 2019	2,722	41.0	57.0	2.0	−16.0
Simple Lógica	4–13 Mar 2019	1,092	36.3	54.7	9.0	−18.4
SocioMétrica/El Español	13–15 Feb 2019	1,000	35.9	57.1	7.0	−21.2
Metroscopia/Henneo	11–13 Feb 2019	1,995	37.0	61.0	2.0	−24.0
Simple Lógica	1–8 Feb 2019	1,017	34.8	57.9	7.3	−23.1
Metroscopia/Henneo	9–15 Jan 2019	2,332	38.0	60.0	2.0	−22.0
Simple Lógica	3–9 Jan 2019	1,042	30.2	62.1	7.7	−31.9
SocioMétrica/El Español	24–31 Dec 2018	1,800	25.8	?	?	−?
Simple Lógica	3–14 Dec 2018	1,204	27.2	61.6	11.2	−34.4
Metroscopia/Henneo	10–12 Dec 2018	1,895	37.0	62.0	1.0	−25.0
Simple Lógica	2–14 Nov 2018	1,019	31.1	58.8	10.1	−27.7
Metroscopia/Henneo	16–18 Oct 2018	1,588	42.0	56.0	2.0	−14.0
Simple Lógica	1–5 Oct 2018	1,055	29.7	59.8	10.5	−30.1
Metroscopia/Henneo	17–19 Sep 2018	1,095	44.0	54.0	2.0	−10.0
Simple Lógica	3–7 Sep 2018	1,010	31.2	60.8	8.0	−29.6
SocioMétrica/El Español	22–30 Aug 2018	1,200	43.8	45.5	10.6	−1.7
Simple Lógica	1–3 Aug 2018	1,029	32.9	52.1	15.1	−19.2
Metroscopia/Henneo	16–25 Jul 2018	2,260	43.0	55.0	2.0	−12.0
Simple Lógica	2–6 Jul 2018	1,048	34.0	51.0	14.9	−17.0
Simple Lógica	4–8 Jun 2018	1,030	36.1	50.5	13.5	−14.4
Simple Lógica	3–10 May 2018	1,067	20.7	70.9	8.4	−50.2
Metroscopia/El País	7–9 May 2018	1,726	30.0	68.0	2.0	−38.0
Simple Lógica	2–9 Apr 2018	1,062	21.2	69.9	8.9	−48.7
Metroscopia/El País	4–5 Apr 2018	1,278	30.0	69.0	1.0	−39.0
Simple Lógica	1–7 Mar 2018	1,076	24.5	70.2	5.2	−45.7
Metroscopia/El País	2–5 Mar 2018	1,175	30.0	69.0	1.0	−39.0
Metroscopia/El País	5–8 Feb 2018	1,321	31.0	67.0	2.0	−36.0
Simple Lógica	1–7 Feb 2018	1,065	24.3	65.7	10.0	−41.4
Metroscopia/El País	9–11 Jan 2018	1,332	33.0	65.0	2.0	−32.0
Simple Lógica	2–8 Jan 2018	1,079	24.3	67.7	8.0	−43.4
Simple Lógica	5–13 Dec 2017	1,077	27.7	64.5	7.8	−36.8
Metroscopia/El País	6–8 Nov 2017	1,730	39.0	59.0	2.0	−20.0
Simple Lógica	2–8 Nov 2017	1,071	29.3	65.1	5.6	−35.8
SocioMétrica/El Español	27 Oct–3 Nov 2017	800	41.5	?	?	−?
Simple Lógica	2–10 Oct 2017	1,053	21.4	70.3	8.3	−48.9
Simple Lógica	5–14 Sep 2017	1,078	30.7	62.2	7.2	−31.5
Simple Lógica	1–10 Aug 2017	?	25.0	?	?	−?
Metroscopia/El País	14–18 Jul 2017	1,700	31.0	65.0	4.0	−34.0
Simple Lógica	3–10 Jul 2017	1,003	30.7	60.1	9.2	−29.4
Metroscopia/El País	27–28 Jun 2017	1,017	35.0	62.0	3.0	−27.0
SocioMétrica/El Español	6–16 Jun 2017	800	33.3	53.8	12.9	−20.5
Simple Lógica	5–9 Jun 2017	1,004	29.0	62.5	8.5	−33.5
Metroscopia/El País	29 May–1 Jun 2017	1,768	36.0	63.0	1.0	−27.0
Simple Lógica	3–12 May 2017	1,002	25.5	69.6	5.0	−44.1
Simple Lógica	3–10 Apr 2017	1,008	23.7	70.3	6.0	−46.6
Simple Lógica	1–9 Mar 2017	1,006	23.4	71.2	5.4	−47.8
Simple Lógica	6–10 Feb 2017	1,005	21.6	73.4	5.0	−51.8
Simple Lógica	9–13 Jan 2017	?	23.8	?	?	−?
Simple Lógica	1–7 Dec 2016	1,000	25.2	67.3	7.5	−42.1
Simple Lógica	2–8 Nov 2016	1,003	22.9	73.0	4.1	−50.1
Metroscopia/El País	10–13 Oct 2016	1,388	31.0	67.0	2.0	−36.0
Simple Lógica	3–11 Oct 2016	1,002	19.1	76.7	4.2	−57.6
SocioMétrica/El Español	26–30 Sep 2016	1,000	18.6	77.7	3.7	−59.1
Simple Lógica	1–14 Sep 2016	1,046	23.8	72.4	3.8	−48.6
Metroscopia/El País	6–8 Sep 2016	1,294	28.0	70.0	2.0	−42.0
Simple Lógica	1–10 Aug 2016	1,049	20.0	72.7	7.3	−52.7
Simple Lógica	1–15 Jul 2016	1,033	25.3	66.7	8.0	−41.4

=== Pablo Casado ===
Polling firm/Commissioner	Fieldwork date	Sample size	Pablo Casado (PP)			
Polling firm/Commissioner	Fieldwork date	Sample size	check	X mark	Question	Net
Metroscopia/Henneo	11–16 Apr 2019	4,775	30.0	66.0	4.0	−36.0
Simple Lógica	1–5 Apr 2019	1,054	21.2	67.7	11.1	−46.5
Metroscopia/Henneo	18–25 Mar 2019	2,722	26.0	68.0	6.0	−42.0
Simple Lógica	4–13 Mar 2019	1,092	20.5	67.4	12.1	−46.9
SocioMétrica/El Español	13–15 Feb 2019	1,000	29.6	60.6	9.8	−31.0
Metroscopia/Henneo	11–13 Feb 2019	1,995	26.0	68.0	6.0	−42.0
Simple Lógica	1–8 Feb 2019	1,017	23.6	65.7	10.7	−42.1
Metroscopia/Henneo	9–15 Jan 2019	2,332	29.0	63.0	8.0	−34.0
Simple Lógica	3–9 Jan 2019	1,042	24.5	64.2	11.3	−39.7
SocioMétrica/El Español	24–31 Dec 2018	1,800	34.4	44.8	20.7	−10.4
Simple Lógica	3–14 Dec 2018	1,204	19.9	65.5	14.6	−45.6
Metroscopia/Henneo	10–12 Dec 2018	1,895	28.0	66.0	6.0	−38.0
Simple Lógica	2–14 Nov 2018	1,019	20.7	66.8	12.5	−46.1
Metroscopia/Henneo	16–18 Oct 2018	1,588	27.0	66.0	7.0	−39.0
Simple Lógica	1–5 Oct 2018	1,055	21.7	62.7	15.6	−41.0
Metroscopia/Henneo	17–19 Sep 2018	1,095	21.0	71.0	8.0	−50.0
Simple Lógica	3–7 Sep 2018	1,010	25.4	61.0	13.6	−35.6
SocioMétrica/El Español	22–30 Aug 2018	1,200	35.0	42.9	22.2	−7.9
Simple Lógica	1–3 Aug 2018	1,029	22.4	53.2	24.4	−30.8
Metroscopia/Henneo	16–25 Jul 2018	2,260	27.0	58.0	15.0	−31.0

=== Mariano Rajoy ===
Polling firm/Commissioner	Fieldwork date	Sample size	Mariano Rajoy (PP)			
Polling firm/Commissioner	Fieldwork date	Sample size	check	X mark	Question	Net
Simple Lógica	2–6 Jul 2018	1,048	26.9	64.9	8.2	−38.0
Simple Lógica	4–8 Jun 2018	1,030	26.2	68.7	5.1	−42.5
Simple Lógica	3–10 May 2018	1,067	21.6	72.4	6.0	−50.8
Metroscopia/El País	7–9 May 2018	1,726	21.0	79.0	0.0	−58.0
Simple Lógica	2–9 Apr 2018	1,062	21.3	70.7	8.0	−49.4
Metroscopia/El País	4–5 Apr 2018	1,278	25.0	75.0	0.0	−50.0
Simple Lógica	1–7 Mar 2018	1,076	24.2	71.9	3.8	−47.7
Metroscopia/El País	2–5 Mar 2018	1,175	24.0	75.0	1.0	−51.0
Metroscopia/El País	5–8 Feb 2018	1,321	27.0	73.0	0.0	−46.0
Simple Lógica	1–7 Feb 2018	1,065	24.5	67.7	7.8	−43.2
Metroscopia/El País	9–11 Jan 2018	1,332	27.0	73.0	0.0	−46.0
Simple Lógica	2–8 Jan 2018	1,079	26.8	67.1	6.1	−40.3
Simple Lógica	5–13 Dec 2017	1,077	31.0	64.1	4.8	−33.1
Metroscopia/El País	6–8 Nov 2017	1,730	39.0	61.0	0.0	−22.0
Simple Lógica	2–8 Nov 2017	1,071	32.9	63.2	3.9	−30.3
SocioMétrica/El Español	27 Oct–3 Nov 2017	800	38.8	?	?	−?
Simple Lógica	2–10 Oct 2017	1,053	24.6	68.8	6.6	−44.2
Simple Lógica	5–14 Sep 2017	1,078	28.0	66.2	5.8	−38.2
Simple Lógica	1–10 Aug 2017	?	27.2	?	?	−?
Metroscopia/El País	14–18 Jul 2017	1,700	32.0	67.0	1.0	−35.0
Simple Lógica	3–10 Jul 2017	1,003	25.3	68.1	6.6	−42.8
Metroscopia/El País	27–28 Jun 2017	1,017	27.0	72.0	1.0	−45.0
SocioMétrica/El Español	6–16 Jun 2017	800	29.4	64.3	6.3	−34.9
Simple Lógica	5–9 Jun 2017	1,004	28.5	67.1	4.4	−38.6
Metroscopia/El País	29 May–1 Jun 2017	1,768	28.0	71.0	1.0	−43.0
Simple Lógica	3–12 May 2017	1,002	27.1	69.5	3.4	−42.4
SocioMétrica/El Español	5–12 Apr 2017	800	32.1	61.3	6.6	−29.2
Simple Lógica	3–10 Apr 2017	1,008	26.2	69.3	4.4	−43.1
Metroscopia/El País	6–9 Mar 2017	1,230	30.0	69.0	1.0	−39.0
Simple Lógica	1–9 Mar 2017	1,006	26.8	68.7	4.5	−41.9
SocioMétrica/El Español	13–17 Feb 2017	800	27.7	63.3	9.0	−35.6
Simple Lógica	6–10 Feb 2017	1,005	28.1	68.6	3.4	−40.5
Simple Lógica	9–13 Jan 2017	?	28.9	?	?	−?
Metroscopia/El País	10–12 Jan 2017	1,578	30.0	69.0	1.0	−39.0
SocioMétrica/El Español	22–29 Dec 2016	800	26.8	59.9	13.3	−33.1
Simple Lógica	1–7 Dec 2016	1,000	25.8	68.5	5.8	−42.7
SocioMétrica/El Español	28 Nov–2 Dec 2016	800	27.0	68.6	4.4	−41.6
Metroscopia/El País	23–30 Nov 2016	2,650	32.0	67.0	1.0	−35.0
Metroscopia/El País	7–11 Nov 2016	1,302	38.0	58.0	4.0	−20.0
Simple Lógica	2–8 Nov 2016	1,003	30.3	67.1	2.6	−36.8
Metroscopia/El País	10–13 Oct 2016	1,388	31.0	68.0	1.0	−37.0
Simple Lógica	3–11 Oct 2016	1,002	21.9	74.7	3.5	−52.8
SocioMétrica/El Español	26–30 Sep 2016	1,000	24.2	73.5	2.3	−49.3
Simple Lógica	1–14 Sep 2016	1,046	25.0	71.7	3.3	−46.7
Metroscopia/El País	6–8 Sep 2016	1,294	29.0	70.0	1.0	−41.0
Simple Lógica	1–10 Aug 2016	1,049	28.7	65.7	5.6	−37.0
Simple Lógica	1–15 Jul 2016	1,033	27.3	67.3	5.4	−40.0

=== Pablo Iglesias ===
Polling firm/Commissioner	Fieldwork date	Sample size	Pablo Iglesias (Unidas Podemos)			
Polling firm/Commissioner	Fieldwork date	Sample size	check	X mark	Question	Net
Metroscopia/Henneo	11–16 Apr 2019	4,775	34.0	64.0	2.0	−30.0
Simple Lógica	1–5 Apr 2019	1,054	23.0	68.0	9.0	−45.0
Metroscopia/Henneo	18–25 Mar 2019	2,722	28.0	69.0	3.0	−41.0
Simple Lógica	4–13 Mar 2019	1,092	22.3	68.4	9.3	−46.1
SocioMétrica/El Español	13–15 Feb 2019	1,000	21.6	69.5	8.9	−47.9
Metroscopia/Henneo	11–13 Feb 2019	1,995	25.0	73.0	2.0	−48.0
Simple Lógica	1–8 Feb 2019	1,017	17.8	74.6	7.6	−56.8
Metroscopia/Henneo	9–15 Jan 2019	2,332	27.0	71.0	2.0	−44.0
Simple Lógica	3–9 Jan 2019	1,042	21.4	70.2	8.4	−48.8
Simple Lógica	3–14 Dec 2018	1,204	18.4	70.8	10.8	−52.4
Metroscopia/Henneo	10–12 Dec 2018	1,895	31.0	68.0	1.0	−37.0
Simple Lógica	2–14 Nov 2018	1,019	24.1	66.5	9.4	−42.4
Metroscopia/Henneo	16–18 Oct 2018	1,588	31.0	68.0	1.0	−37.0
Simple Lógica	1–5 Oct 2018	1,055	22.9	66.1	11.0	−43.2
Metroscopia/Henneo	17–19 Sep 2018	1,095	29.0	70.0	1.0	−41.0
Simple Lógica	3–7 Sep 2018	1,010	22.6	70.3	7.1	−47.7
SocioMétrica/El Español	22–30 Aug 2018	1,200	26.5	63.0	10.5	−36.5
Simple Lógica	1–3 Aug 2018	1,029	19.2	68.8	12.0	−49.6
Metroscopia/Henneo	16–25 Jul 2018	2,260	29.0	70.0	1.0	−41.0
Simple Lógica	2–6 Jul 2018	1,048	18.6	71.7	9.7	−53.1
Simple Lógica	4–8 Jun 2018	1,030	22.8	69.3	7.9	−46.5
Simple Lógica	3–10 May 2018	1,067	18.4	74.4	7.2	−56.0
Metroscopia/El País	7–9 May 2018	1,726	25.0	74.0	1.0	−49.0
Simple Lógica	2–9 Apr 2018	1,062	16.4	75.0	8.6	−58.6
Metroscopia/El País	4–5 Apr 2018	1,278	24.0	75.0	1.0	−51.0
Simple Lógica	1–7 Mar 2018	1,076	16.9	78.2	4.9	−61.3
Metroscopia/El País	2–5 Mar 2018	1,175	24.0	75.0	1.0	−51.0
Metroscopia/El País	5–8 Feb 2018	1,321	19.0	81.0	0.0	−62.0
Simple Lógica	1–7 Feb 2018	1,065	15.9	75.3	8.8	−59.4
Metroscopia/El País	9–11 Jan 2018	1,332	19.0	80.0	1.0	−61.0
Simple Lógica	2–8 Jan 2018	1,079	14.5	78.2	7.3	−63.7
Simple Lógica	5–13 Dec 2017	1,077	15.3	78.3	6.4	−63.0
Metroscopia/El País	6–8 Nov 2017	1,730	17.0	82.0	1.0	−65.0
Simple Lógica	2–8 Nov 2017	1,071	14.7	80.0	5.3	−65.3
SocioMétrica/El Español	27 Oct–3 Nov 2017	800	18.1	?	?	−?
Simple Lógica	2–10 Oct 2017	1,053	17.5	75.9	6.6	−58.4
Simple Lógica	5–14 Sep 2017	1,078	21.4	73.2	5.4	−51.8
Simple Lógica	1–10 Aug 2017	?	19.7	?	?	−?
Metroscopia/El País	14–18 Jul 2017	1,700	25.0	74.0	1.0	−49.0
Simple Lógica	3–10 Jul 2017	1,003	23.4	69.2	7.4	−45.8
Metroscopia/El País	27–28 Jun 2017	1,017	26.0	72.0	2.0	−46.0
SocioMétrica/El Español	6–16 Jun 2017	800	22.1	70.9	7.0	−48.8
Simple Lógica	5–9 Jun 2017	1,004	20.5	74.3	5.3	−53.8
Metroscopia/El País	29 May–1 Jun 2017	1,768	25.0	74.0	1.0	−49.0
Simple Lógica	3–12 May 2017	1,002	22.9	73.3	3.8	−50.4
SocioMétrica/El Español	5–12 Apr 2017	800	24.9	66.1	9.0	−41.2
Simple Lógica	3–10 Apr 2017	1,008	21.1	73.8	5.1	−52.7
Metroscopia/El País	6–9 Mar 2017	1,230	26.0	72.0	2.0	−46.0
Simple Lógica	1–9 Mar 2017	1,006	22.1	74.1	3.8	−52.0
SocioMétrica/El Español	13–17 Feb 2017	800	25.1	61.3	13.6	−36.2
Simple Lógica	6–10 Feb 2017	1,005	20.1	75.6	4.3	−55.5
Simple Lógica	9–13 Jan 2017	?	21.0	?	?	−?
Metroscopia/El País	10–12 Jan 2017	1,578	25.0	73.0	2.0	−48.0
SocioMétrica/El Español	22–29 Dec 2016	800	24.4	58.6	17.0	−34.2
Simple Lógica	1–7 Dec 2016	1,000	22.5	71.2	6.3	−48.7
SocioMétrica/El Español	28 Nov–2 Dec 2016	800	23.0	67.7	9.3	−44.7
Metroscopia/El País	23–30 Nov 2016	2,650	27.0	72.0	1.0	−45.0
Metroscopia/El País	7–11 Nov 2016	1,302	30.0	66.0	4.0	−36.0
Simple Lógica	2–8 Nov 2016	1,003	22.3	74.3	3.3	−52.0
Metroscopia/El País	10–13 Oct 2016	1,388	29.0	69.0	2.0	−40.0
Simple Lógica	3–11 Oct 2016	1,002	22.5	73.0	4.5	−50.5
SocioMétrica/El Español	26–30 Sep 2016	1,000	19.4	77.2	3.4	−57.8
Simple Lógica	1–14 Sep 2016	1,046	22.8	73.7	3.5	−50.9
Metroscopia/El País	6–8 Sep 2016	1,294	31.0	67.0	2.0	−36.0
Simple Lógica	1–10 Aug 2016	1,049	18.2	74.3	7.5	−56.1
Simple Lógica	1–15 Jul 2016	1,033	20.7	71.5	7.7	−50.8

=== Albert Rivera ===
Polling firm/Commissioner	Fieldwork date	Sample size	Albert Rivera (Cs)			
Polling firm/Commissioner	Fieldwork date	Sample size	check	X mark	Question	Net
Metroscopia/Henneo	11–16 Apr 2019	4,775	45.0	52.0	3.0	−7.0
Simple Lógica	1–5 Apr 2019	1,054	30.9	59.2	9.8	−28.3
Metroscopia/Henneo	18–25 Mar 2019	2,722	41.0	55.0	4.0	−14.0
Simple Lógica	4–13 Mar 2019	1,092	31.1	58.9	10.0	−27.8
SocioMétrica/El Español	13–15 Feb 2019	1,000	32.2	57.9	9.9	−25.7
Metroscopia/Henneo	11–13 Feb 2019	1,995	40.0	56.0	4.0	−16.0
Simple Lógica	1–8 Feb 2019	1,017	36.0	56.6	7.4	−20.6
Metroscopia/Henneo	9–15 Jan 2019	2,332	42.0	53.0	5.0	−11.0
Simple Lógica	3–9 Jan 2019	1,042	31.4	58.9	9.7	−27.5
SocioMétrica/El Español	24–31 Dec 2018	1,800	42.2	49.0	8.8	−6.8
Simple Lógica	3–14 Dec 2018	1,204	30.5	56.7	12.7	−26.2
Metroscopia/Henneo	10–12 Dec 2018	1,895	44.0	54.0	2.0	−10.0
Simple Lógica	2–14 Nov 2018	1,019	33.5	56.8	9.7	−23.3
Metroscopia/Henneo	16–18 Oct 2018	1,588	42.0	56.0	2.0	−14.0
Simple Lógica	1–5 Oct 2018	1,055	34.1	53.9	11.9	−19.8
Metroscopia/Henneo	17–19 Sep 2018	1,095	41.0	56.0	3.0	−15.0
Simple Lógica	3–7 Sep 2018	1,010	36.2	55.2	8.6	−19.0
SocioMétrica/El Español	22–30 Aug 2018	1,200	41.7	47.2	11.1	−5.5
Simple Lógica	1–3 Aug 2018	1,029	34.3	51.8	13.9	−17.5
Metroscopia/Henneo	16–25 Jul 2018	2,260	43.0	54.0	3.0	−11.0
Simple Lógica	2–6 Jul 2018	1,048	35.9	53.1	11.0	−17.2
Simple Lógica	4–8 Jun 2018	1,030	38.6	52.9	8.5	−14.3
Simple Lógica	3–10 May 2018	1,067	38.6	53.5	7.9	−14.9
Metroscopia/El País	7–9 May 2018	1,726	50.0	46.0	4.0	+4.0
Simple Lógica	2–9 Apr 2018	1,062	39.1	52.0	8.9	−12.9
Metroscopia/El País	4–5 Apr 2018	1,278	54.0	43.0	3.0	+11.0
Simple Lógica	1–7 Mar 2018	1,076	42.6	51.4	5.9	−8.8
Metroscopia/El País	2–5 Mar 2018	1,175	55.0	43.0	2.0	+12.0
Metroscopia/El País	5–8 Feb 2018	1,321	56.0	40.0	4.0	+16.0
Simple Lógica	1–7 Feb 2018	1,065	43.5	47.1	9.5	−3.6
Metroscopia/El País	9–11 Jan 2018	1,332	54.0	43.0	3.0	+11.0
Simple Lógica	2–8 Jan 2018	1,079	45.4	46.7	7.9	−1.3
Simple Lógica	5–13 Dec 2017	1,077	42.8	49.7	7.4	−6.9
Metroscopia/El País	6–8 Nov 2017	1,730	53.0	46.0	1.0	+7.0
Simple Lógica	2–8 Nov 2017	1,071	46.1	48.9	5.0	−2.8
SocioMétrica/El Español	27 Oct–3 Nov 2017	800	53.0	?	?	+?
Simple Lógica	2–10 Oct 2017	1,053	38.3	53.6	8.2	−15.3
Simple Lógica	5–14 Sep 2017	1,078	39.8	53.9	6.3	−14.1
Simple Lógica	1–10 Aug 2017	?	35.9	?	?	−?
Metroscopia/El País	14–18 Jul 2017	1,700	48.0	50.0	2.0	−2.0
Simple Lógica	3–10 Jul 2017	1,003	40.2	51.9	7.9	−11.7
Metroscopia/El País	27–28 Jun 2017	1,017	44.0	54.0	2.0	−10.0
SocioMétrica/El Español	6–16 Jun 2017	800	44.5	45.6	9.9	−1.1
Simple Lógica	5–9 Jun 2017	1,004	40.0	52.1	8.0	−12.1
Metroscopia/El País	29 May–1 Jun 2017	1,768	48.0	50.0	2.0	−2.0
Simple Lógica	3–12 May 2017	1,002	41.0	53.3	5.6	−12.3
SocioMétrica/El Español	5–12 Apr 2017	800	50.2	39.0	10.7	+11.2
Simple Lógica	3–10 Apr 2017	1,008	40.9	52.4	6.7	−11.5
Metroscopia/El País	6–9 Mar 2017	1,230	49.0	48.0	3.0	+1.0
Simple Lógica	1–9 Mar 2017	1,006	41.4	53.8	4.9	−12.4
SocioMétrica/El Español	13–17 Feb 2017	800	47.8	40.5	11.7	+7.3
Simple Lógica	6–10 Feb 2017	1,005	39.5	55.3	5.2	−15.8
Simple Lógica	9–13 Jan 2017	?	37.8	?	?	−?
Metroscopia/El País	10–12 Jan 2017	1,578	47.0	50.0	3.0	−3.0
SocioMétrica/El Español	22–29 Dec 2016	800	45.7	38.2	16.1	+7.5
Simple Lógica	1–7 Dec 2016	1,000	38.5	53.3	8.2	−14.8
SocioMétrica/El Español	28 Nov–2 Dec 2016	800	43.3	46.1	10.6	−2.8
Metroscopia/El País	23–30 Nov 2016	2,650	46.0	52.0	2.0	−6.0
Metroscopia/El País	7–11 Nov 2016	1,302	54.0	40.0	6.0	+14.0
Simple Lógica	2–8 Nov 2016	1,003	42.2	53.2	4.5	−11.0
Metroscopia/El País	10–13 Oct 2016	1,388	52.0	45.0	3.0	+7.0
Simple Lógica	3–11 Oct 2016	1,002	38.9	56.6	4.5	−17.7
SocioMétrica/El Español	26–30 Sep 2016	1,000	39.8	57.0	3.2	−17.2
Simple Lógica	1–14 Sep 2016	1,046	42.0	53.8	4.2	−11.8
Metroscopia/El País	6–8 Sep 2016	1,294	56.0	41.0	3.0	+15.0
Simple Lógica	1–10 Aug 2016	1,049	35.0	56.6	8.4	−21.6
Simple Lógica	1–15 Jul 2016	1,033	37.9	53.9	8.2	−16.0

=== Santiago Abascal ===
Polling firm/Commissioner	Fieldwork date	Sample size	Santiago Abascal (Vox)			
Polling firm/Commissioner	Fieldwork date	Sample size	check	X mark	Question	Net
Metroscopia/Henneo	11–16 Apr 2019	4,775	21.0	69.0	10.0	−48.0
Simple Lógica	1–5 Apr 2019	1,054	11.1	76.1	12.9	−65.0
Metroscopia/Henneo	18–25 Mar 2019	2,722	19.0	68.0	13.0	−49.0
Simple Lógica	4–13 Mar 2019	1,092	12.3	73.0	14.6	−60.7
SocioMétrica/El Español	13–15 Feb 2019	1,000	17.8	64.0	18.2	−46.2
Metroscopia/Henneo	11–13 Feb 2019	1,995	19.0	65.0	16.0	−46.0
Simple Lógica	1–8 Feb 2019	1,017	13.9	72.8	13.3	−58.9
Metroscopia/Henneo	9–15 Jan 2019	2,332	17.0	62.0	21.0	−45.0
Simple Lógica	3–9 Jan 2019	1,042	14.7	71.0	14.3	−56.3
Metroscopia/Henneo	10–12 Dec 2018	1,895	20.0	57.0	23.0	−37.0
