= Eva Cárdenas =

Spanish businesswoman (born 1965)

- Born: Eva Cárdenas Botas; 1965 (age 60–61); A Coruña, Galicia, Spain
- Education: University of Santiago de Compostela; IE Business School (MBA)
- Partner: Alberto Núñez Feijóo (2013–present)
- Children: 2

Eva Cárdenas Botas (born 1965) is a Spanish businesswoman. She was an executive at Inditex from 1999, and founded and led Zara Home from 2003 to 2018.

== Biography ==
Cárdenas was born in A Coruña, in Galicia. Her father, from Bilbao, was a director of Caixa Galicia. Her maternal grandfather was a pharmacist in A Coruña, and on that side of the family she is related to Francisco Botas, director of Abanca.

Cárdenas graduated in economics from the University of Santiago de Compostela and has a Master of Business Administration degree from the IE Business School. She worked for Kraft and L'Oréal before joining Inditex in 1999, the company owned by fellow Galician Amancio Ortega. She led the cosmetics division of Zara, before founding and leading its home decoration division Zara Home in 2003; in 2022, its annual turnover was €800 million.

In October 2018, Cárdenas left Inditex to focus on her family. In December 2020, she became an external consultant to the ceramics company Sargadelos. She left the position in August 2022.

== Personal life ==
Since 2013, Cárdenas has been in a relationship with politician Alberto Núñez Feijóo, whom she met on a flight from Madrid to A Coruña, when he was the President of the Regional Government of Galicia. In February 2017, she gave birth to their son, also called Alberto, when she was 51 and the father was 55; she has a daughter from a previous relationship. In August 2022, after Feijóo was elected president of the People's Party, the couple moved to Madrid.
