= Alberto Núñez Feijóo =

Spanish politician (born 1961)

Alberto Núñez Feijóo MP
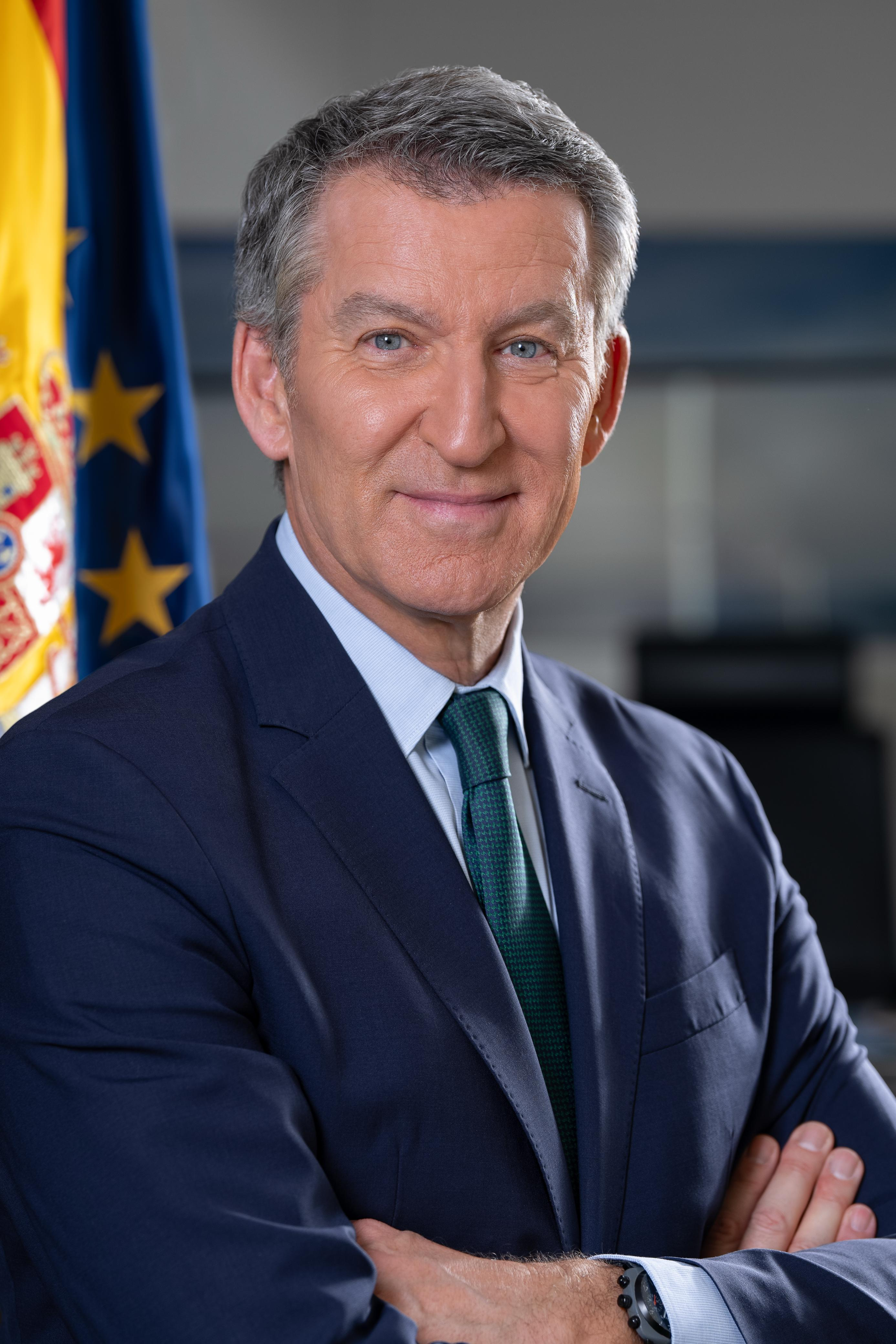
- Feijóo in 2025

Leader of the Opposition
- Incumbent
- Assumed office 2 April 2022
- Monarch: Felipe VI
- Prime Minister: Pedro Sánchez
- Preceded by: Pablo Casado

President of the People's Party
- Incumbent
- Assumed office 2 April 2022
- Secretary-General: Cuca Gamarra
- Preceded by: Pablo Casado

President of the Regional Government of Galicia
- In office 18 April 2009 – 14 May 2022
- Monarchs: Juan Carlos I Felipe VI
- Vice President: Alfonso Rueda; Francisco Conde
- Preceded by: Emilio Pérez Touriño
- Succeeded by: Alfonso Rueda

Member of the Congress of Deputies
- Incumbent
- Assumed office 17 August 2023
- Constituency: Madrid
Additional positions
Member of the Senate
In office 25 May 2022 – 17 August 2023
Appointed by	Parliament of Galicia
First Vice President of the Regional Government of Galicia
In office 10 September 2004 – 2 August 2005
President	Manuel Fraga
Preceded by	Javier Suárez Vence
Succeeded by	Anxo Quintana
Minister of Territorial Policy, Public Works and Housing of Galicia
In office 18 January 2003 – 2 August 2005
President	Manuel Fraga
Preceded by	Xosé Cuiña
Succeeded by	María José Caride
President of the People's Party of Galicia
In office 15 January 2006 – 1 April 2022
Secretary-General	Alfonso Rueda; Miguel Tellado
Preceded by	Manuel Fraga
Succeeded by	Alfonso Rueda
Member of the Parliament of Galicia
In office 18 July 2005 – 24 May 2022
Constituency	Pontevedra

Personal details
- Born: 10 September 1961 (age 65) A Peroxa, Galicia, Spain
- Party: People's (since 1991)
- Domestic partner(s): Eva Cárdenas (2013–present)
- Children: 1
- Education: University of Santiago de Compostela

Alberto Núñez Feijóo (Spanish: [alˈβeɾto ˈnuɲeθ fejˈxo(o)]; born 10 September 1961) is a Spanish politician who has been leader of the Spanish opposition and president of the People's Party since 2022. He served as the President of the Autonomous Government of Galicia from 2009 to 2022. Feijóo was appointed government formateur following the 2023 election; however, his investiture ultimately failed.

Formerly a civil servant, Feijóo was secretary general of Galicia's ministries of agriculture and health before moving to the same role at the national Ministry of Health, and for three years he was President of the State Society of Mail and Telegraphs. Having officially joined the People's Party of Galicia (PPdeG), he entered the Parliament of Galicia in 2005 and succeeded Manuel Fraga as party president the following January. In the 2009 Galician regional election, the PPdeG won a majority, and Feijóo became regional president.

Feijóo won further terms in 2012, 2016, and 2020. In 2022, he was confirmed as Pablo Casado's successor as the president of the PP. He resigned his posts in the regional parliament and presidency, and was appointed to the Senate as one of the senators designated by the Galician parliament. He was described by the media as a moderate until his appointment as national party leader.

== Early life and civil service ==
Feijóo was born at number 6 Avenida de Mesón in the village of Os Peares near A Peroxa in the Province of Ourense, on 10 September 1961. His father was Saturnino Núñez, a construction foreman, and his mother Sira Feijóo. After graduating in law from the University of Santiago de Compostela in 1984, Núñez Feijóo wanted to become a judge, but his father's unemployment meant that he had to find a job in the civil service to support the family.

In 1991, Feijóo was chosen to be secretary general of the regional Ministry of Agriculture under José Manuel Romay Beccaría. He followed him to the Ministry of Health, first in Galicia and later to the national ministry when Romay was appointed by prime minister José María Aznar. From 2000 to 2003, Feijóo was President of the State Society of Mail and Telegraphs, before returning to regional government as the Minister of Territorial Policy, Public Works and Housing of Galicia.

== Political career ==
=== Galician politics ===
Having twice voted for the Spanish Socialist Workers' Party (PSOE) under Felipe González in 1982 and 1986, Feijóo did not join the People's Party until 1991. After his role in the national health service, the President of the Community of Madrid, Esperanza Aguirre, wanted him to lead the same ministry in her region.

In 2005, Manuel Fraga of the People's Party of Galicia was removed from office after 15 years as President of the Regional Government of Galicia (PPdeG), when the Socialists' Party of Galicia (PSdeG) and the Galician Nationalist Bloc (BNG) formed a coalition to install Emilio Pérez Touriño in his place. At the congress to name Fraga's successor in January 2006, he prevented a divide by persuading leading candidates Feijóo and José Manuel Barreiro to run in tandem as candidates for the party's president and vice president respectively, thereby taking 96% of the vote.

In the 2009 Galician regional election, the PPdeG's share of seats rose from 37 to 38, thereby giving them an absolute majority of one. In April, he was invested as president by the 8th legislature. He won a second term in the 2012 Galician regional election, which he had called early. Despite receiving over 100,000 votes fewer than in 2009, his party gained three seats due to reduced turnout. In March 2013, members of the opposition called for his resignation after photographs from the mid-1990s were published of him with Marcial Dorado, who was later convicted as a drug dealer. Feijóo said that at the time, he had no knowledge of Dorado's criminal lifestyle.

Feijóo retained his majority in 2016 and 2020, the latter time increasing to 42 seats. He was tipped to run to succeed Mariano Rajoy as national PP leader in 2018 but turned it down, crying while declaring that being President of Galicia was his highest ambition. He resigned as president of the PPdeG effective from 1 April 2022 to take over the post in the national party.

=== President of the People's Party ===
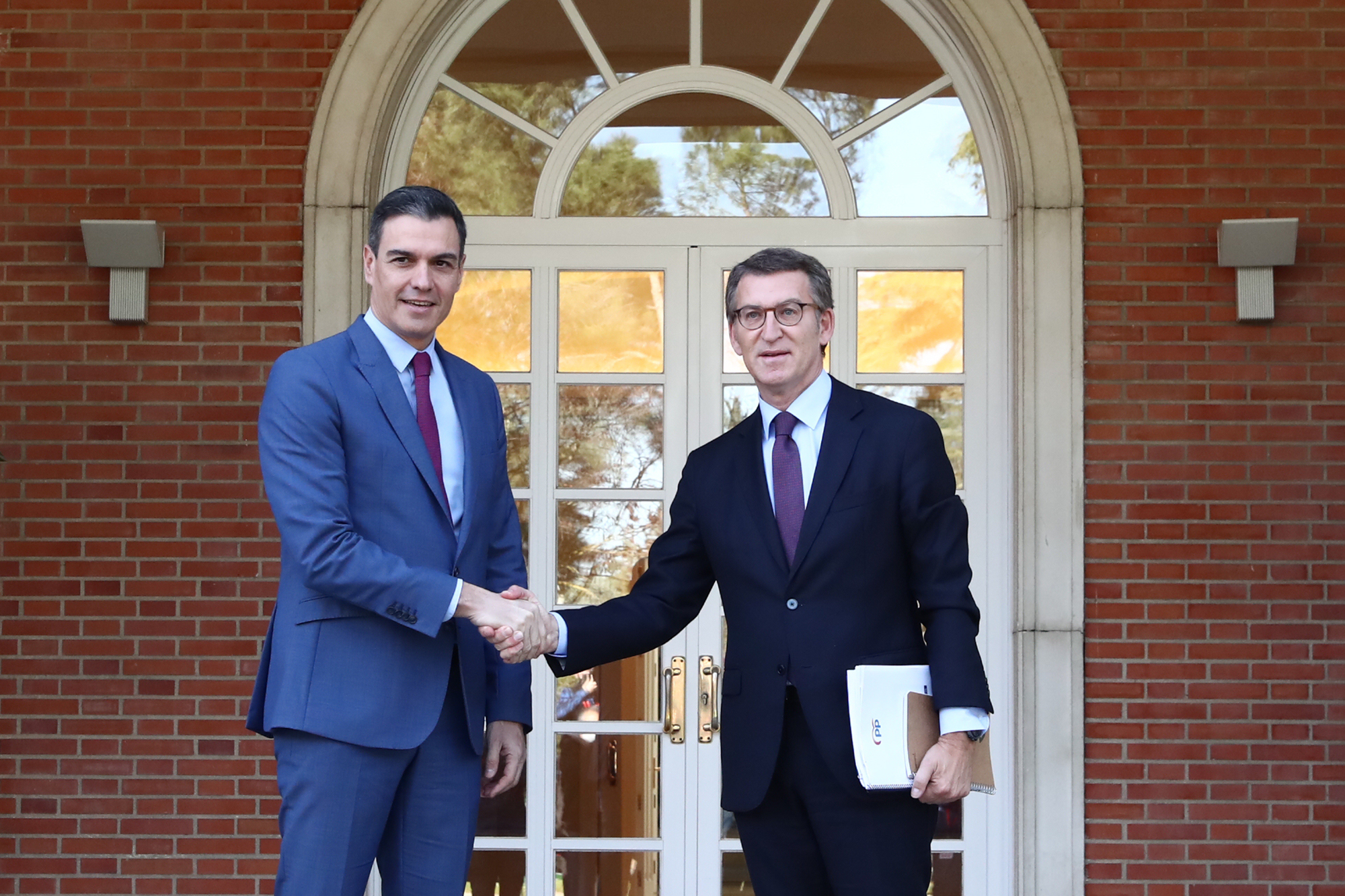
Feijóo (right) and Pedro Sánchez in April 2022

In March 2022, the 20th National Congress of the People's Party was called to elect a new national party leader after the forced ousting of incumbent Pablo Casado, who had been losing support following a dispute with the President of the Community of Madrid, Isabel Díaz Ayuso. Feijóo put himself forward as a candidate, and was endorsed by regional PP leaders such as Ayuso, Jorge Azcón (Aragon), Alfonso Fernández Mañueco (Castile and León) and Juan Manuel Moreno (Andalusia). He ran unopposed as the only other prospective candidate, a 28-year-old local activist from Valencia, did not have enough verified signatures. He named the party's spokesperson in the Congress of Deputies, Cuca Gamarra, as the party's new Secretary General.

During Feijóo's candidacy, the PP formed a government with Vox in the Cortes of Castile and León. He endorsed the coalition, but said that he would not repeat it on the national level, adding that "sometimes it's better to lose government than win it through populism." As party president, Feijóo halted his predecessor's plans to sell the party headquarters on Calle de Génova.

On 24 May 2022, Feijóo was elected by the Parliament of Galicia as senator for the region, for which he resigned his seat in the Parliament of Galicia. A year later, he led his party in regional and local elections. He attacked prime minister Pedro Sánchez of the PSOE for relying on parliamentary support from EH Bildu, a Basque nationalist party fielding 44 convicted ETA members as candidates, as well as for his government passing legislation on sexual consent that led to offenders having their sentences lowered or quashed.

Feijóo made gains in the snap Spanish election in 2023.

The PP achieved absolute majorities in the city and Community of Madrid, and took regions including Aragon, the Valencian Community and the Balearic Islands from the PSOE, leading Sánchez to call an early national election. The conservative party secured 137 seats, winning the elections but failing to achieve a parliamentary majority of 176 seats; however, King of Spain Felipe VI asked Feijóo to try to form government. On 23 August, The Congress of Deputies' Socialist speaker, Francina Armengol, announced that Feijóo's investiture debate would take place on 27 and 29 September. The debate's first vote failed, with 172 MPs voting in favor and 178 against; the second vote took place on 29 September, and it confirmed Feijóo's failure to become prime minister.

Following Feijóo's failure in his investiture vote, Sánchez was voted in as PM as Feijóo and his party summoned Spaniards to the streets in protest against Sánchez's proposed amnesty law for supporters of Catalan independence. After corruption cases rocked Sánchez, in January 2025, Feijóo opened the door to a motion of no confidence against Sánchez with the support of Vox and Junts, a pro-Catalan independence party headed by Carles Puigdemont, having previously refused to speak to Junts.

At his party's National Congress on 5 June 2025, Feijóo was reelected as the party's president with 99.24% of the votes. During the event, Feijóo promised to lead the party to a "reformist centre" of the political spectrum in an attempt to attract both left- and right-wing voters, vowing to restore Spain's institutions after 7 years of Socialist rule. On 13 July, Feijóo announced that he would be willing to reach agreements with right-wing Vox in exchange for the party's support for a PP minority government, even though he promised he was confident in that the PP would gain an absolute majority in the next elections. In November 2025, Feijóo led tens of thousands of protesters in Madrid demanding the resignation of Sánchez amid corruption scandals involving former ministers.

==== Scandals ====
Feijóo has been subject of controversy over a past association with Marcial Dorado, a Galician businessman convicted in 2003 of drug trafficking and money laundering. In 2013, El País published two photographs, with a further image published in 2015. Feijóo confirmed that the photographs were genuine and that their friendship had ended in 1997. This matter resurfaced during the 2023 general election campaign. He has faced criticism over corruption cases linked to his party, some from before his leadership, including Gúrtel, Púnica, Lezo and the Kitchen affair. Feijóo has been accused of failing to condemn these cases or demand accountability since taking over the party.

== Political positions ==
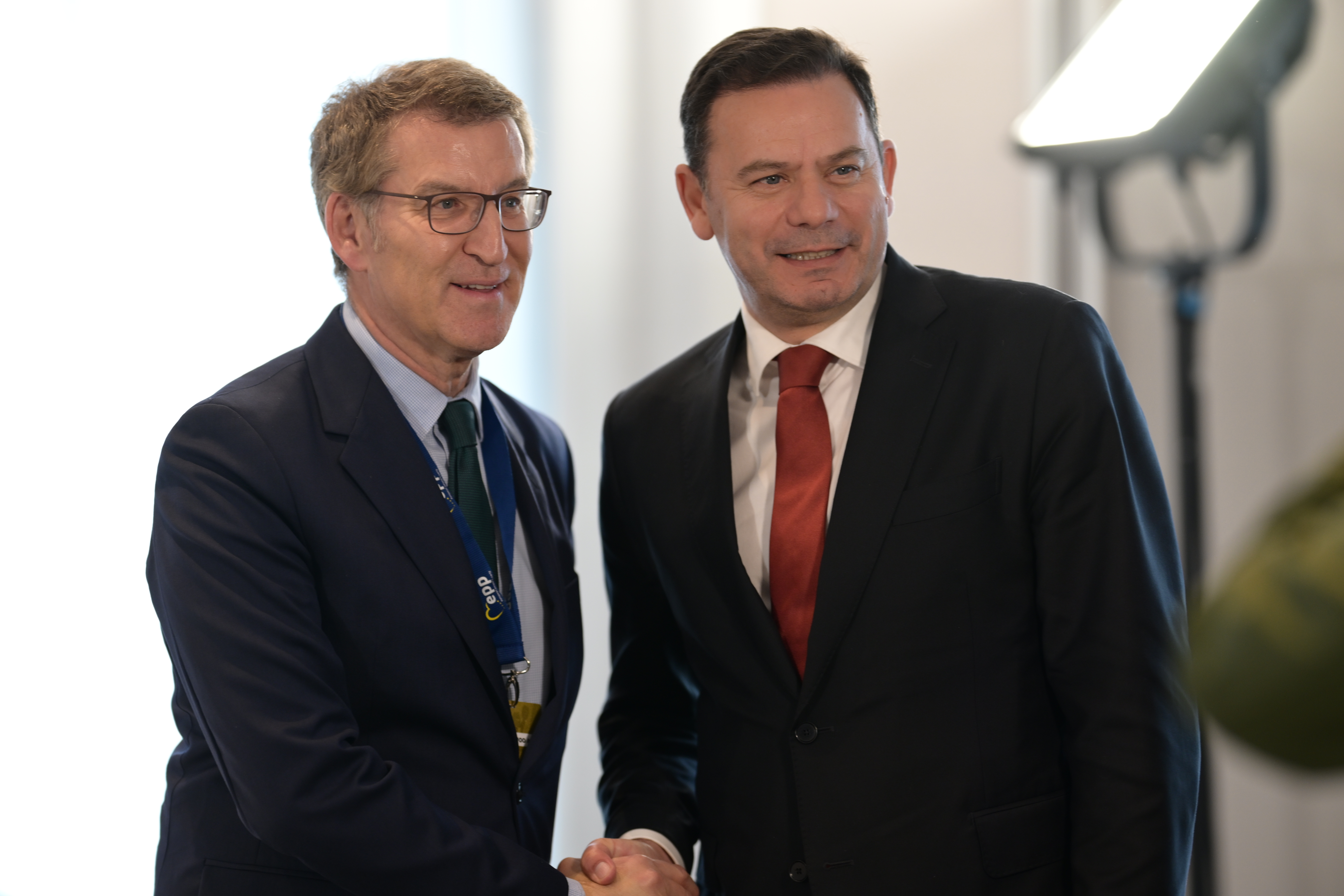
Feijóo (left) meeting the prime minister of Portugal, Luís Montenegro, at the 2024 European People's Party summit

Feijóo has defined himself as a reformist of the centre-right and as a liberal. He is described by the media as a moderate. His allies have praised him for his stances, while opposing parties disputed these labels due to his approval of a PP-led government with Vox in Castile and León.

=== Basque Nationalist Party ===
Feijóo is a close friend and ally of Iñigo Urkullu, the former President of the Basque Country from the Basque Nationalist Party (EAJ-PNV). The pair first found common ground in 2013 when they defended their shipyards before the European Union. While Casado opposed further devolution to the Basque Country, Feijóo has been more sympathetic.

=== Healthcare ===
In 2011, Feijóo suggested that hospital patients should pay for non-medical services such as food and showers during their stay, and the following year he suggested privatising all that is not at the "core" of healthcare. In 2013, he said that healthcare would not be privatised under his government.

=== Immigration ===
In 2024, Feijóo criticised the immigration policy of the Sánchez government, accusing Prime Minister Pedro Sánchez of "promoting Spain as a destination" instead of going to Africa to "fight the (migration) mafia". In 2026, he condemned the Spanish government’s proposal to legalise approximately 500,000 undocumented immigrants.

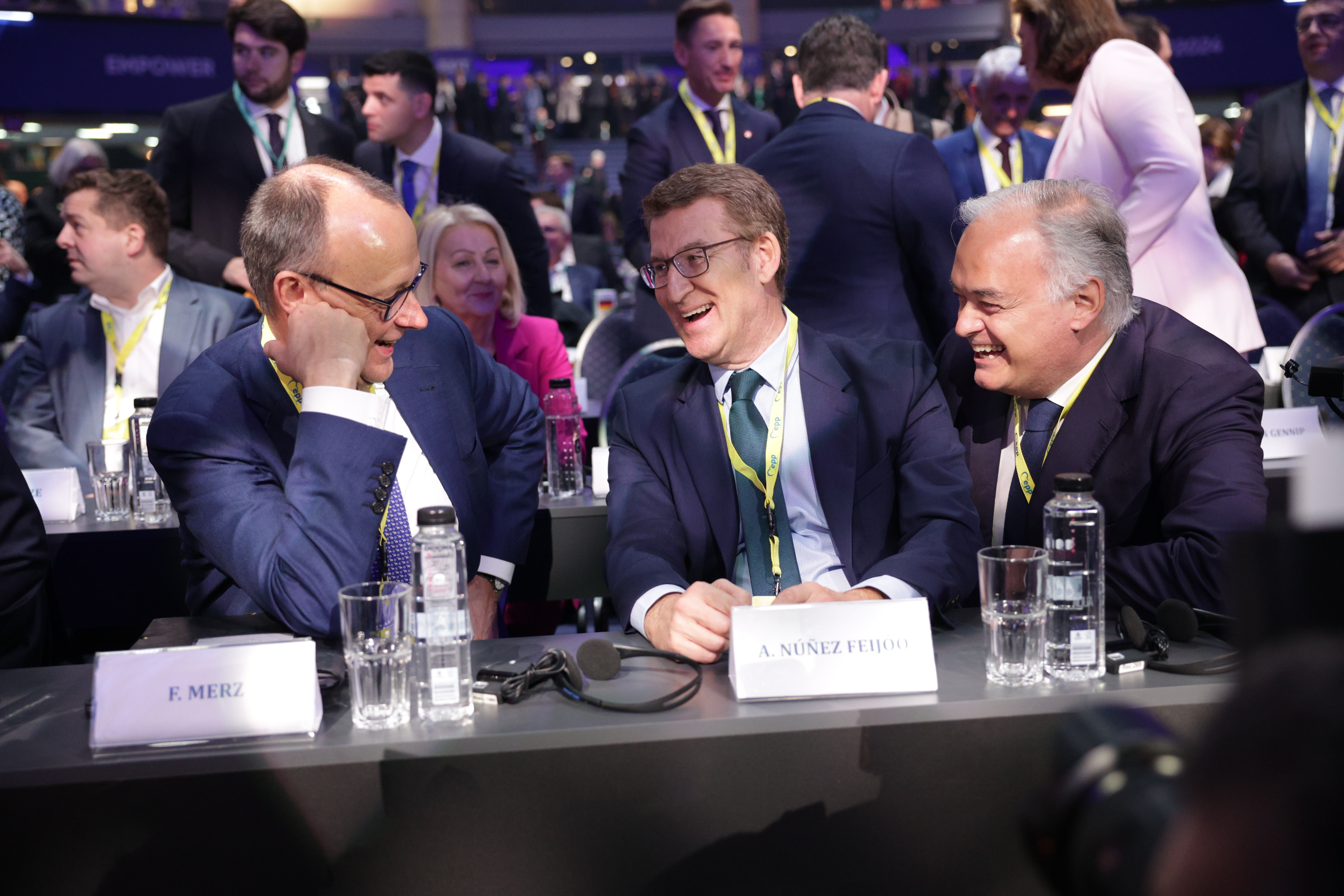
Feijóo with Friedrich Merz on 6 March 2024

=== Regional languages ===
Under Feijóo in 2009, the PPdeG dropped its support for the Galician language, which had been supported by his predecessor and founder of the PP, Manuel Fraga. In 2019, it was reported that Galician was now mandatory for all teacher candidates in the region, though Feijóo had personally said that knowledge of it would be desired but not mandatory. This policy put him against a proposal by national PP leader Pablo Casado, in which no public job would require knowledge of a regional language. During the congress in which he was confirmed as PP president, he declared their language policy to be one of "cordial bilingualism".

=== 2025–2026 Iranian protests ===
While the Sánchez government initially refrained from issuing an official statement regarding the anti-government protests in Iran, Feijóo expressed his support on 9 January, stating: “The people of Iran are fighting for their freedom, with women at the forefront.” He further emphasized, “Spain must support without ambiguity those who risk their lives to be free. Without silences. Without nuances.”

== Personal life ==
A 2009 profile of Feijóo by El País observed that his personal life and spending habits were more austere than those of the previous regional president, Touriño. Feijóo was in a relationship with the journalist Carmen Gámir from 2000 to 2012. Since 2013, he has been in a relationship with Zara Home director Eva Cárdenas, who gave birth to his only child, also named Alberto, in February 2017.

Feijóo is known as an admirer of Galician cuisine and a supporter of the football club Deportivo de La Coruña. Feijóo speaks Spanish and Galician while his English is considered poor. He was attacked for this by PSOE, who argued that it is essential for a prime minister to speak fluent English. He replied that there are always translators at international summits. Feijóo is a Catholic.

== Honours ==
- Royal Order of Isabella the Catholic, Grand Cross, 28 October 2002
- Order of Prince Henry, Grand Cross, 9 June 2015
- Order of the Rising Sun, 3rd Class, Gold Rays with Neck Ribbon, 3 November 2021

== See also ==
- Xunta de Galicia

Political offices
Preceded by Javier Suárez Vence	First Vice President of Galicia; 2004–2005	Succeeded by Anxo Quintana
Preceded by Emilio Pérez Touriño	President of Galicia; 2009–2022	Succeeded by Alfonso Rueda
Preceded by Pablo Casado	Leader of the Opposition; 2022–present	Incumbent
Party political offices
Preceded by Manuel Fraga	President of the People's Party of Galicia; 2006–2022	Succeeded by Alfonso Rueda
Preceded by Pablo Casado	President of the People's Party; 2022–present	Incumbent
