= Pablo Casado =

Spanish politician (born 1981)

The Most Excellent Pablo Casado
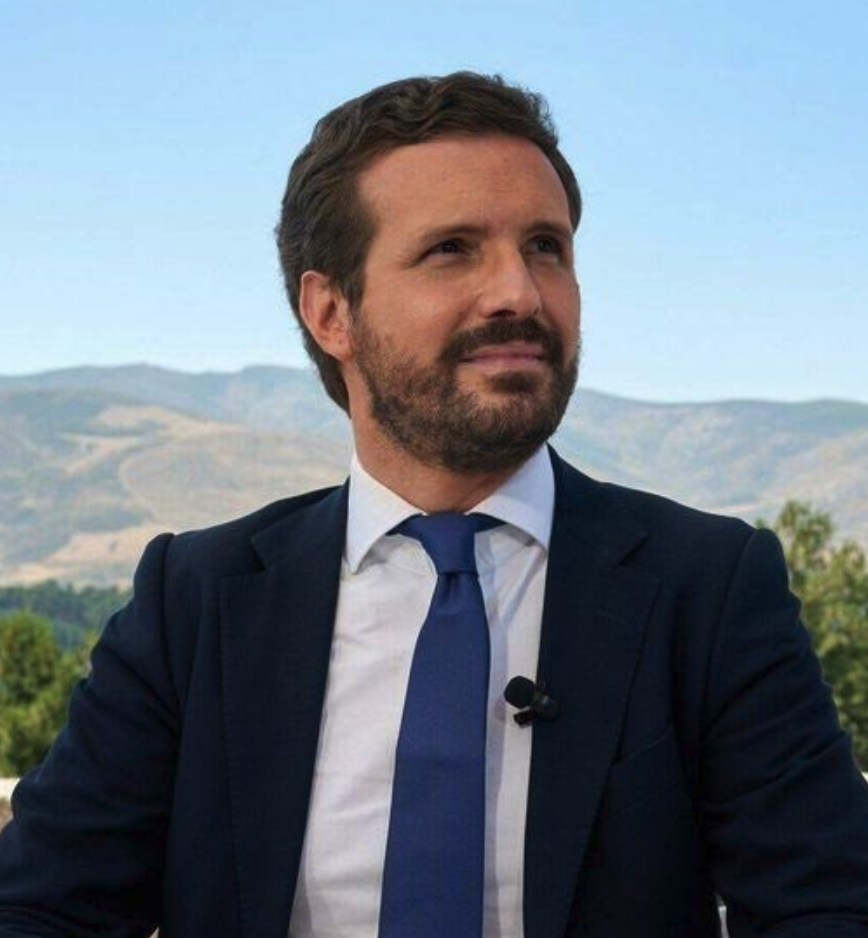
- Casado in 2024

Leader of the Opposition
- In office 21 July 2018 – 2 April 2022
- Monarch: Felipe VI
- Prime Minister: Pedro Sánchez
- Preceded by: Mariano Rajoy
- Succeeded by: Alberto Núñez Feijóo

President of the People's Party
- In office 21 July 2018 – 2 April 2022
- Secretary-General: Teodoro García Egea
- Preceded by: Mariano Rajoy
- Succeeded by: Alberto Núñez Feijóo

Deputy Secretary-General of Communications of the People's Party
- In office 18 June 2015 – 21 July 2018
- President: Mariano Rajoy
- Preceded by: Carlos Floriano
- Succeeded by: Marta González

Member of the Congress of Deputies
- In office 13 December 2011 – 4 April 2022
- Succeeded by: Percival Manglano
- Constituency: Ávila (2011–2019); Madrid (2019–2022)

Member of the Assembly of Madrid
- In office 13 June 2007 – 9 July 2009

Personal details
- Born: Pablo Casado Blanco; 1 February 1981 (age 45) Palencia, Castile and León, Spain
- Party: People's Party (until 2022)
- Spouse: Isabel Torres Orts (m. 2009)
- Children: 2
- Education: Douai School; ICADE; CES Cardenal Cisneros; King Juan Carlos University

Pablo Casado Blanco (Spanish pronunciation: [ˈpaβlo kaˈsaðo ˈβlaŋko]; born 1 February 1981) is a Spanish former politician. He was a member of the Congress of Deputies representing Madrid until 4 April 2022, having previously represented Ávila between 2011 and 2019. From 2015 to 2018, he also served as vice secretary general of communication of the People's Party (PP). From July 2018 until April 2022, he was the president of the PP.

== Biography ==
Pablo Casado was born on 1 February 1981 in Palencia. His father, Miguel Casado González, a physician and his mother, Esther Blanco Ruiz, is a university professor. His family owns an ophthalmologic clinic in his native city. Casado completed his primary education at Colegio Castilla, managed by the Marist Brothers, and took the 8th year of the General Basic Education (EGB) at Douai School in the United Kingdom.

Casado completed his law degree at CES Cardenal Cisneros, a privately managed institution affiliated with the Complutense University of Madrid, and his BA in Business Administration and Management at the King Juan Carlos University (URJC).

In June 2009, he married Isabel Torres Orts; the couple have a daughter Paloma and a son Pablo. Isabel Torres is from a wealthy industrial family in Elche, and works as a psychologist in a private clinic in Madrid.

== Career ==
=== Start of political career ===
Casado entered politics and joined the People's Party (PP) in 2003 when he was still a student. He presided over the regional branch of the PP's youth organization in the Community of Madrid, known as the New Generations (NNGG), between 2005 and 2013.

=== Member of the Assembly of Madrid ===
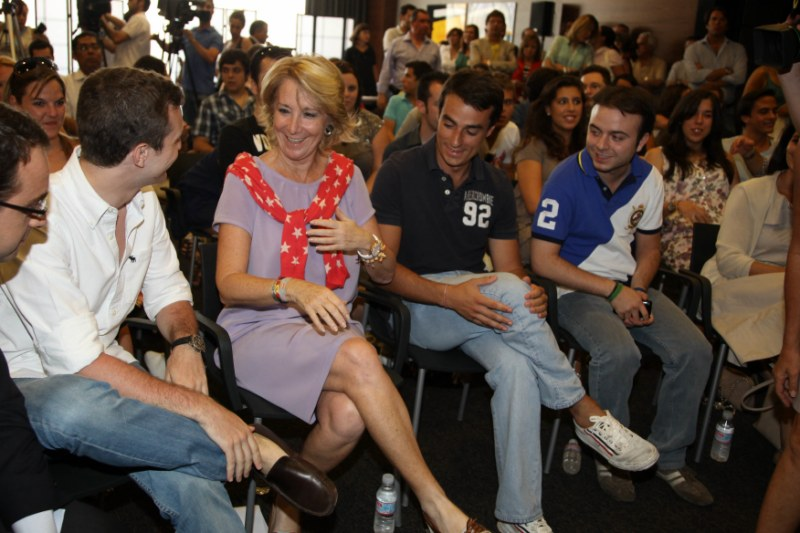
Casado (white shirt) and Ángel Carromero (No. 2 numbered shirt) next to Esperanza Aguirre during a summer event of the Madrilenian "New Generations" in 2010

In 2007, he was included as candidate in the PP list for the election to the Assembly of Madrid; he became a member of the 8th term of the regional legislature (in June), where he held the functions of spokesman in the parliamentary Commission of Justice and Public Administrations and assistant spokesman in the Commission of Budget and Finance. Casado resigned as regional legislator in July 2009.

Between 2009 and 2012, Casado directed the office of former Prime Minister José María Aznar. During this period, in 2010, he became one of the founders (along with Carlos Bustelo, Rafael Bardají and Enrique Navarro Gil) of the Friends of Israel Initiative think tank.

=== National MP ===
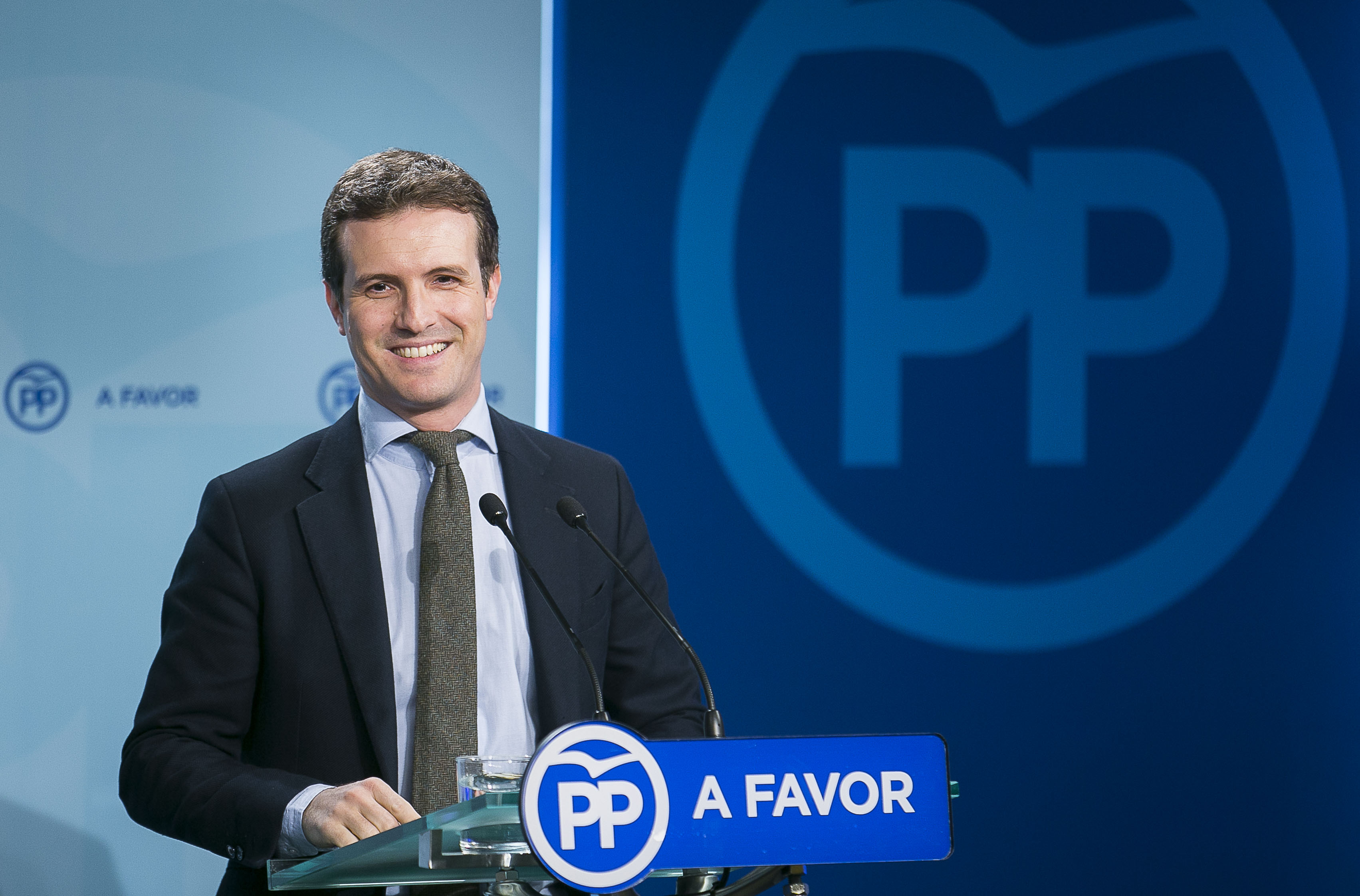
Casado during a press conference as vice secretary general of communication in 2017

Casado was included as candidate in the PP list for the constituency of Ávila in the November 2011 general election and became a member of the Congress of Deputies in the 10th legislative term and was appointed spokesperson of the Joint Congress–Senate Committee for the European Union, deputy spokesperson for Foreign Affairs, and member of both the Justice Committee and the International Development Cooperation Committee.

Between 2011 and 2015, he was a member of the Committee on Security, Political Affairs and Human Rights of the Parliamentary Assembly of the Union for the Mediterranean (ApUPM). From 2013 to 2015 he also served as a member of COSAC, the Conference of Parliamentary Committees for Union Affairs.

He was subsequently re-elected in the 2015 and 2016 general elections. He was designated spokesman of the Campaign Committee of the PP for the local and regional elections of May 2015. Later in June 2015, he was appointed vice secretary general of communication of the PP by the party president Mariano Rajoy.

In 2018, he participated in a meeting of the "New Leaders for Europe" group at the World Economic Forum in Davos. In 2017 he was also listed as a member of the Europe Policy Group. In 2019 and 2022 he participated in the Bilderberg Club meeting in Montreaux and Washington.

=== President of the People's Party ===
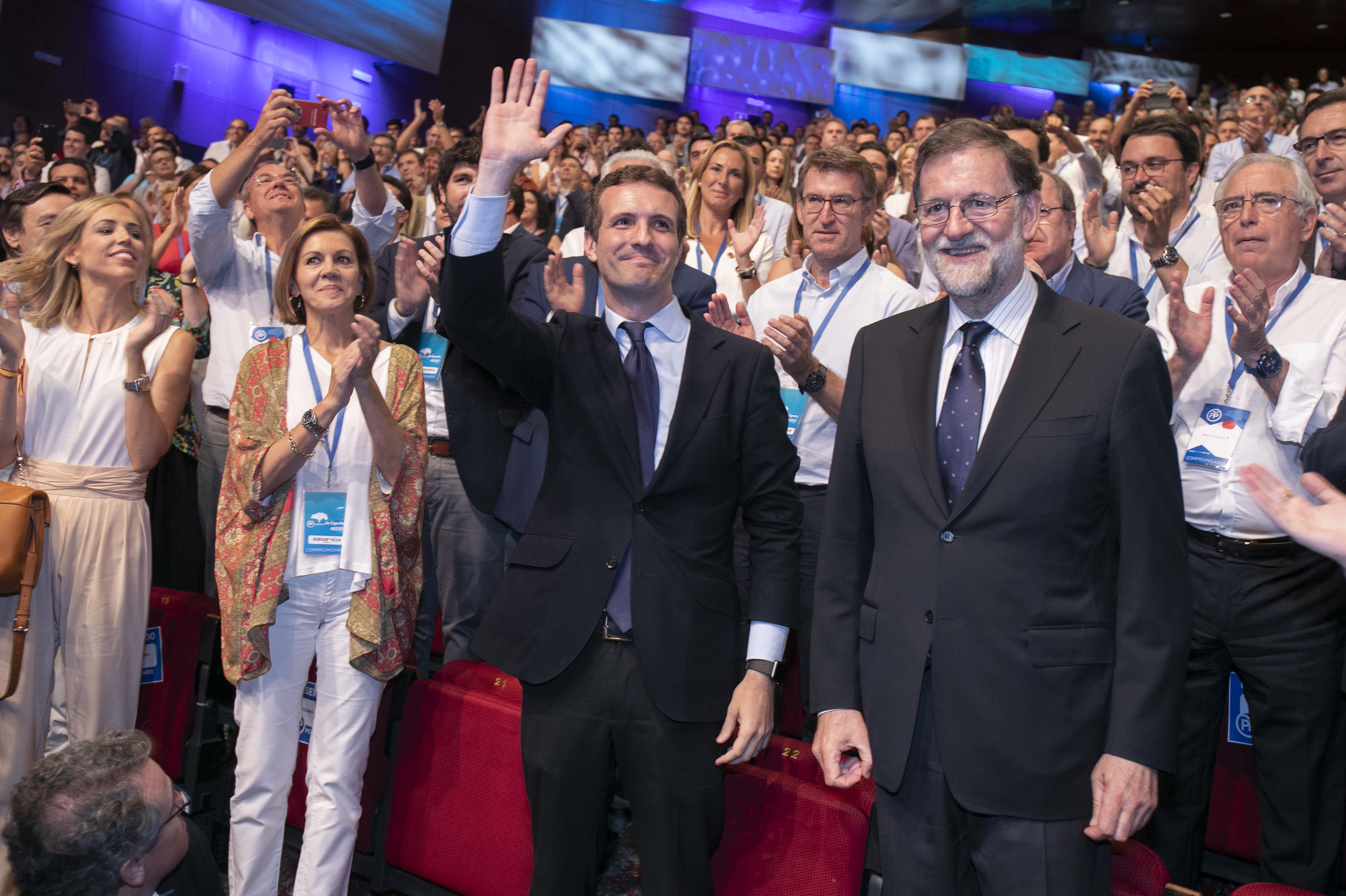
Casado between María Dolores de Cospedal and Mariano Rajoy during the 19th National Congress of the PP on 21 July 2018.

==== 19th PP National Congress ====
After the motion of no confidence, Mariano Rajoy resigned from the leadership of the PP, Pablo Casado ran as pre-candidate to the primary election to the presidency of the party. He introduced himself as a (potential) leader intending to recover voters from Citizens and Vox. Casado obtained the second most votes out of 6 candidates after Soraya Sáenz de Santamaría, former Deputy Prime Minister of Spain, who received the most votes among the party members with a margin of 1,500 votes. On July 21, 2018, during the 19th Extraordinary National Congress of the PP, a final vote among 3,082 party delegates was held in order to decide the new leader of the PP between Sáenz de Santamaría and Casado. He won the voting among the delegates with 1,701 votes (57.2%) versus 1,250 (42%) votes to Sáenz de Santamaría out of 2,973 votes, being proclaimed as the new president.

=== Leader of the People's Party ===
After his election as party president, Casado led a process of internal reorganisation within the People's Party. The first regional elections under his leadership were the Andalusian elections held on 2 December 2018, in which the People's Party candidate, Juan Manuel Moreno, secured the presidency of the Regional Government of Andalusia. In the 2019 municipal elections, the People's Party recovered key cities and provincial capitals, such as Madrid, Zaragoza, Oviedo and Córdoba.

=== 2019 election ===
In response to a budget defeat, Prime Minister Pedro Sánchez dissolved the Cortes Generales. In May 2019 general election, the People's Party lost over half of their seats in the Cortes Generales, with Albert Rivera's Citizens growing, and the new far-right Vox also taking a significant number of voters.

Under Casado's leadership, the PP made a significant recovery in the November 2019 general election, increasing its representation from 66 to 89 seats and reasserting itself as the main opposition force. In May 2020, he established abstention on the vote on the extension of the State of Alarm as the party line.

=== Leadership challenges ===
His leadership of the PP was challenged in 2022 by Isabel Díaz Ayuso, the president of the community of Madrid, leading to internal conflict. Casado resigned as PP leader and an MP on 4 April, and was replaced as party leader by Alberto Núñez Feijóo. Casado presided over an orderly transition at the April 2022 extraordinary congress, where delegates elected Alberto Núñez Feijóo as his successor with 98.35% of the vote. In his farewell address to party members, Casado emphasized his loyalty to the PP and appealed for unity, expressing hope that the organization would continue to serve as a credible alternative in Spanish politics.

== Political positions ==
Casado has described himself as a liberal-conservative focusing on tax reductions, support for small and medium-sized enterprises, and promoting family-oriented policies within the broader People's Party program. Some commentators have described him as neoconservative and linked his political style to José María Aznar and Esperanza Aguirre.

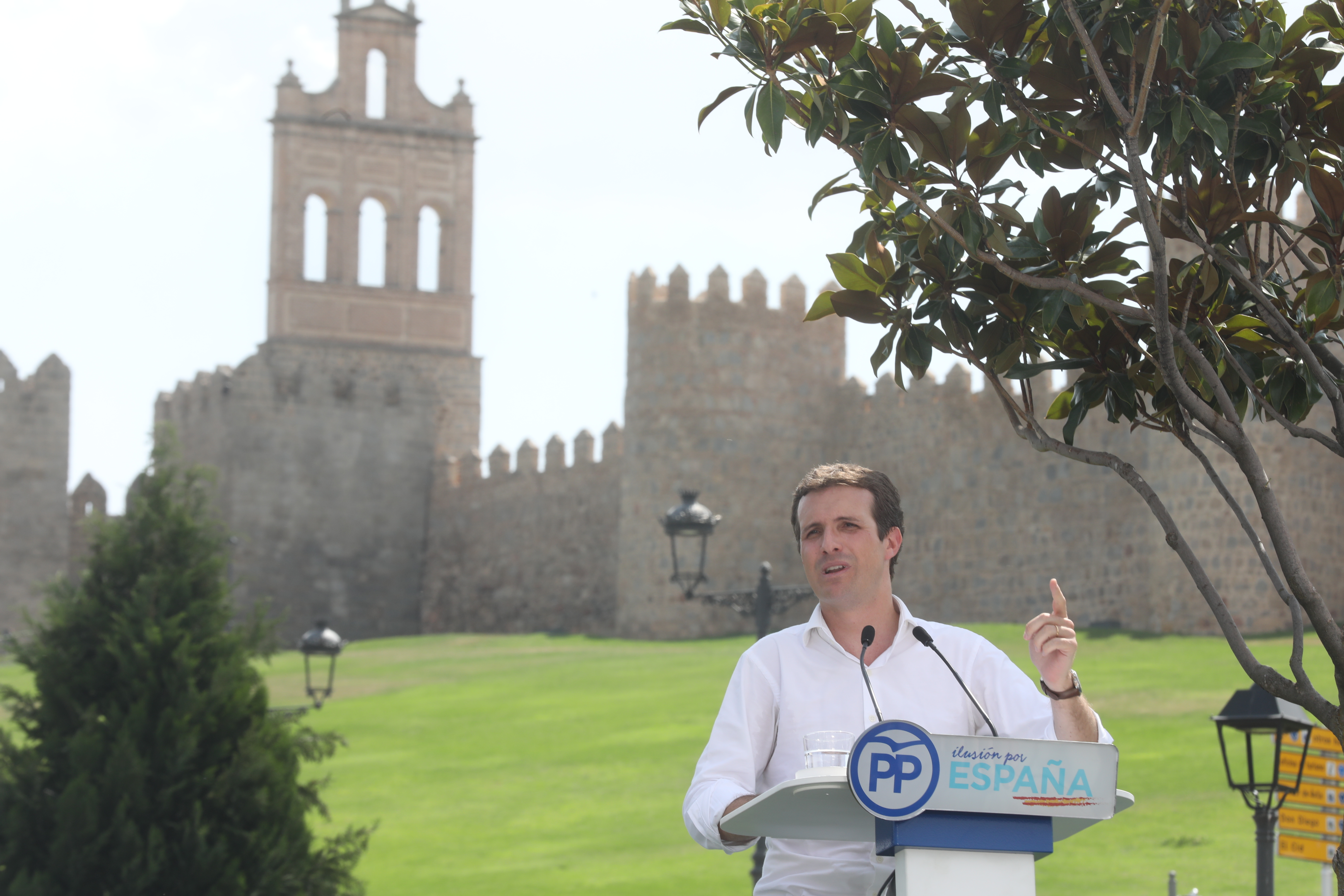
Casado in front of the Walls of Ávila in September 2018 during a ceremony for the opening of the political year. He inveighed against the Historical Memory Law.

In October 2017, Casado supported a potential reform of the Organic Law of Political Parties, which would include the illegalization of political parties promoting the independence of a part of Spain. He criticized German court's 2018 decision to limit the extradition of Puigdemont, questioning the framework of the Schengen Area in response. In September 2018, he directed PP members of the European Parliament to abstain in the voting of the Sargentini report calling for triggering Article 7 proceedings against the Hungarian government of Viktor Orbán. Casado expressed opposition to abortion, euthanasia, and gender ideology, and defended a strongly centralized view of Spain.

As party leader, Casado emphasized anti-corruption measures, the renewal of regional and local candidates, and the recovery of the People's Party's electoral position. Under his leadership, the PP recovered significantly in the November 2019 general election, rising from 66 to 89 seats, and re-established itself as Spain's main opposition force.

== Post-political career ==
After announcing that he would not seek re-election as President of the Partido Popular, he publicly declared at the National Congress that he would resign his seat as a Member of Parliament, relinquishing his financial compensation, and stated that he would withdraw entirely from public life. A few months later, he was appointed Chairman of the Atlantic Basin Initiative, linked to the Transatlantic Leadership Network affiliated with Johns Hopkins University in Washington.

Following his departure from active politics, Casado co-founded Hyperion Fund, a venture capital vehicle specialising in dual-use defence, aerospace and cybersecurity technologies; within its first year it raised its €150 million target and secured institutional commitments from Indra, Sapa, Prosegur and Fond-ICO (the investment arm of the Instituto de Crédito Oficial). The vehicle was approved by Spain's securities regulator (CNMV) in January 2024 and was covered by the financial press at launch; it is managed by Singular Bank Asset Management with Nortia Investment Holding as anchor investor, and Casado co‑founded it alongside investor Ricardo Gómez‑Acebo Botín. The fund's advisory board include Anders Fogh Rasmussen, former NATO Secretary General and former Prime Minister of Denmark; Paula Dobriansky, former U.S. Under Secretary of State; Michèle Alliot-Marie, former French Minister of Defence, Foreign Affairs, Justice and Interior; and Rob Murray, Head of Innovation at NATO and CIO of Saab Aero.

On 18 June 2024, Hyperion announced a first close of €53 million (around 35% of its €150 million target) and the start of its investment phase; the fund indicated a focus on dual‑use defence, aerospace, cybersecurity and artificial intelligence, explicitly excluding weapons and lethal equipment in line with Article 8 of the EU's SFDR. In early 2025, the final close at the €150 million target was reported again, with the fund indicating it expected to deploy roughly a quarter of that capital during 2025 (circa €38 million). During an Investor Day in October 2025, he announced the creation of a management company focused on the defense and aerospace sectors, as well as the launch of a new fund in 2026 with a target size of €500 million.

== Electoral history ==
Electoral history of Pablo Casado
Election	List	Constituency	List position	Result
2007 Madrilenian regional election	PP	-	40th (out of 120)	Elected
2011 Spanish general election	PP	Ávila	2nd (out of 3)	Elected
Las Navas del Marqués local election, 2015	PP	-	13th (out of 13)	Unelected
2015 Spanish general election	PP	Ávila	1st (out of 3)	Elected
2016 Spanish general election	PP	Ávila	1st (out of 3)	Elected
2019 Spanish general election	PP	Madrid	1st (out of 37)	Elected

== Controversies ==
Pablo Casado obtained his degree in law in the CES Cardenal Cisneros in September 2007 after having reportedly passed half of the credits of the 5-year licenciature in four months of that year. Casado stated that those subjects had been passed while he was studding in Universidad Pontificia de Comillas so that approval process took place in the first year in the new university.

Casado has a BA in Business Administration and Management and an MA in Administrative Law from the King Juan Carlos University (URJC). The latter degree is a source of controversy, as Casado was found to have obtained it from the now controverted School of Administrative Law of that university without ever attending any class, taking any test, and turning in a final dissertation. An internal investigation by the URJC confirmed that the degrees were legitimate and uncovered no impropriety. The Supreme Court closed its review in September 2018, finding no evidence of criminal wrongdoing and concluding that any preferential treatment did not constitute a crime.

== Citations ==
Party political offices
Preceded by Mariano Rajoy	President of the People's Party; 2018–2022	Succeeded by Alberto Núñez
Political offices
Vacant Title last held by Pedro Sánchez	Leader of the Opposition; 2018–2022	Succeeded by Alberto Núñez
