= Next Galician regional election =

Election in the Spanish region of Galicia

- No later than 25 March 2028

All 75 seats in the Parliament of Galicia 38 seats needed for a majority
- Opinion polls
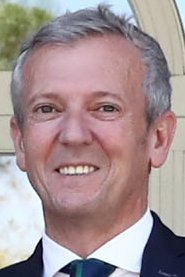

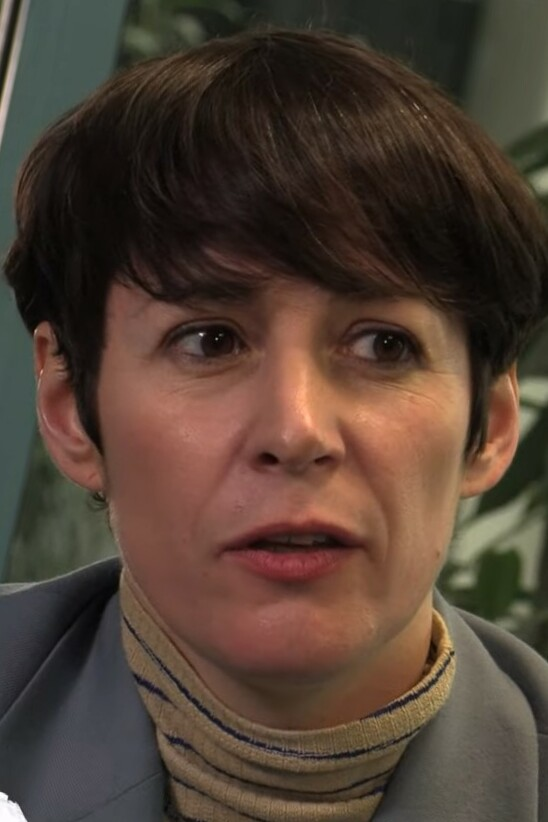

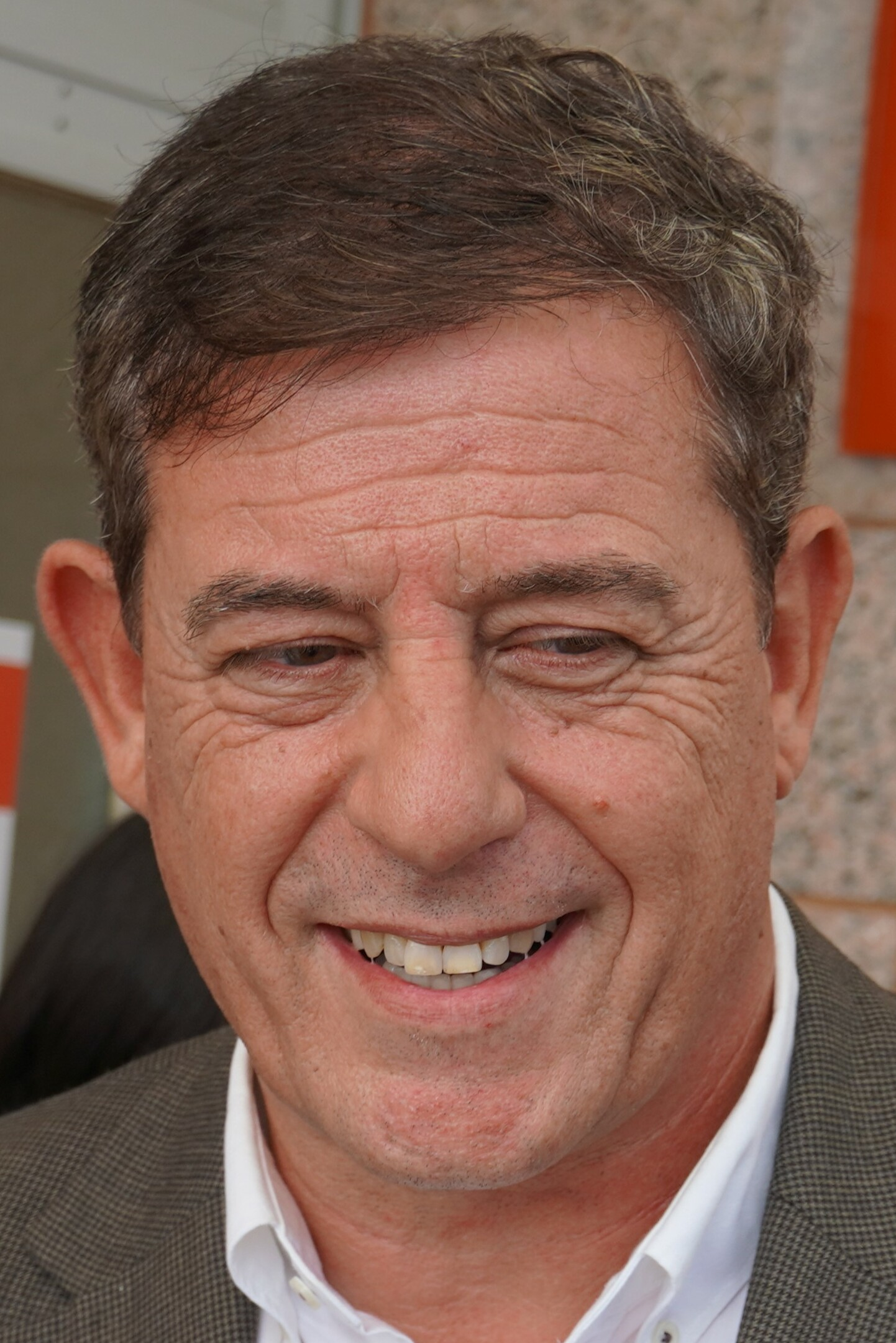

Leader	Alfonso Rueda	Ana Pontón	José Ramón Gómez Besteiro
Party	PP	BNG	PSdeG–PSOE
Leader since	22 May 2022	28 February 2016	18 October 2023
Leader's seat	Pontevedra	A Coruña	Lugo
Last election	40 seats, 47.4%	25 seats, 31.3%	9 seats, 14.1%
Current seats	40	25	9
Seats needed	In majority	▲13	▲29
Leader	Armando Ojea
Party	DO
Leader since	15 November 2023
Leader's seat	Ourense
Last election	1 seat, 1.0%
Current seats	1
Seats needed	▲37
Incumbent President
Alfonso Rueda
PP

A regional election will be held in Galicia no later than Saturday, 25 March 2028 to elect the 13th Parliament of the autonomous community. All 75 seats in the Parliament will be up for election.

== Overview ==
Under the 1981 Statute of Autonomy, the Parliament of Galicia is the unicameral legislature of the homonymous autonomous community, having legislative power in devolved matters, as well as the ability to grant or withdraw confidence from a regional president. The electoral and procedural rules are supplemented by national law provisions.

=== Date ===
The term of the Parliament of Galicia expires four years after the date of its previous election, unless it is dissolved earlier. The election decree shall be issued no later than 25 days before the scheduled expiration date of parliament and published on the following day in the Official Journal of Galicia (DOG), with election day taking place 54 days after the decree's publication. The previous election was held on 18 February 2024, which means that the chamber's term will expire on 18 February 2028. The election decree shall be published in the DOG no later than 25 January 2028, setting the latest possible date for election day on 19 March 2028.

The regional president has the prerogative to dissolve the Parliament of Galicia at any given time and call a snap election, provided that it does not occur before one year after a previous one under this procedure. In the event of an investiture process failing to elect a regional president within a two-month period from the first ballot, the Parliament is to be automatically dissolved and a fresh election called.

=== Electoral system ===
Voting for the Parliament is based on universal suffrage, comprising all Spanish nationals over 18 years of age, registered in Galicia and with full political rights, provided that they have not been deprived of the right to vote by a final sentence.

The Parliament of Galicia has a minimum of 60 and a maximum of 80 seats, with electoral provisions fixing its size at 75. All are elected in four multi-member constituencies—corresponding to the provinces of A Coruña, Lugo, Ourense and Pontevedra, each of which is assigned an initial minimum of 10 seats and the remaining 35 distributed in proportion to population—using the D'Hondt method and closed-list proportional voting, with a five percent-threshold of valid votes (including blank ballots) in each constituency. The use of this electoral method may result in a higher effective threshold depending on district magnitude and vote distribution.

As a result of the aforementioned allocation, each Parliament constituency would be entitled the following seats (as of 11 December 2025): (Note: This seat allocation has been manually calculated by applying the electoral rules set out in the law, on the basis of the latest official population figures provided by the Spanish government as of 2026. As such, it should be deemed as a provisional, non-binding estimation. The definitive allocation will be determined by the election decree at the time of the parliament's dissolution.)

Seats	Constituencies
25	A Coruña
22	Pontevedra
14	Lugo, Ourense

The law does not provide for by-elections to fill vacant seats; instead, any vacancies arising after the proclamation of candidates and during the legislative term will be filled by the next candidates on the party lists or, when required, by designated substitutes.

=== Current parliament ===
The table below shows the composition of the parliamentary groups in the chamber at the present time.

Current parliamentary composition
Groups	Parties	Legislators	
Groups	Parties	Seats	Total
People's Parliamentary Group of Galicia	PP	40	40
Galician Nationalist Bloc's Parliamentary Group	BNG	25	25
Socialists of Galicia's Parliamentary Group	PSdeG–PSOE	9	9
Mixed Parliamentary Group	DO	1	1

== Parties and candidates ==
The electoral law allows for parties and federations registered in the interior ministry, alliances and groupings of electors to present lists of candidates. Parties and federations intending to form an alliance are required to inform the relevant electoral commission within 10 days of the election call, whereas groupings of electors need to secure the signature of at least one percent of the electorate in the constituencies for which they seek election, disallowing electors from signing for more than one list. Amendments in 2024 required a balanced composition of men and women in the electoral lists through the use of a zipper system.

Below is a list of the main parties and alliances which contested the election:

Candidacy	Parties and alliances	Leading candidate	Ideology	Previous result		Gov.	Ref.
Candidacy	Parties and alliances	Leading candidate	Ideology	Vote %	Seats	Gov.	Ref.
PP	List: People's Party (PP)	Alfonso Rueda	Conservatism; Christian democracy	47.4%	40	Yes	
BNG	List: Galician Nationalist Bloc (BNG) – Galician People's Union (UPG) – Galician Movement for Socialism (MGS) – Abrente–Galician Democratic Left (Abrente–EDG) – Galician Workers' Front (FOGA); Renewal–Nationalist Brotherhood (Anova) – Irmandiño Meeting (EI) – Galician People's Front (FPG) – Movement for the Grassroots (MpB)	Ana Pontón	Galician nationalism Left-wing nationalism Socialism	31.3%	25	No	
PSdeG– PSOE	List: Socialists' Party of Galicia (PSdeG–PSOE)	José Ramón Gómez Besteiro	Social democracy	14.1%	9	No	
DO	List: Ourensan Democracy (DO)	Armando Ojea	Localism; Right-wing populism	1.0%	1	No	

== Opinion polls ==
The tables below list opinion polling results in reverse chronological order, showing the most recent first and using the dates when the survey fieldwork was done, as opposed to the date of publication. Where the fieldwork dates are unknown, the date of publication is given instead. The highest percentage figure in each polling survey is displayed with its background shaded in the leading party's colour. If a tie ensues, this is applied to the figures with the highest percentages. The "Lead" column on the right shows the percentage-point difference between the parties with the highest percentages in a poll.

=== Voting intention estimates ===
The table below lists weighted voting intention estimates. Refusals are generally excluded from the party vote percentages, while question wording and the treatment of "don't know" responses and those not intending to vote may vary between polling organisations. When available, seat projections determined by the polling organisations are displayed below (or in place of) the percentages in a smaller font; 38 seats are required for an absolute majority in the Parliament of Galicia.

Polling firm/Commissioner	Fieldwork date	Sample size	Turnout	PP	BNG	PSdeG–PSOE	Vox	Sumar	DO	Lead
Sondaxe/La Voz de Galicia	9–24 Sep 2026	1,223	?	44.1; 39	30.1; 25	15.1; 10	4.0; 0	2.8; 0	0.9; 1	14.0
EM-Analytics/Electomanía	1–28 Jul 2026	1,104	?	43.3; 37	36.8; 30	11.6; 7	2.8; 0	0.6; 0	1.2; 1	6.5
Sigma Dos/El Mundo	9–22 Jul 2026	1,198	?	47.5; 40/42	29.1; 22/25	13.8; 10	3.5; 0	2.0; 0	0.7; 0/1	18.4
Sondaxe/La Voz de Galicia	12–25 Feb 2026	1,223	?	45.8; 39	31.7; 25	12.5; 10	4.1; 0	2.2; 0	0.8; 1	14.1
Sondaxe/La Voz de Galicia	3–11 Dec 2025	1,223	?	45.1; 39	32.1; 25	12.8; 10	4.4; 0	–	0.9; 1	13.0
Sondaxe/La Voz de Galicia	17–25 Sep 2025	1,223	?	45.3; 39	31.7; 24	13.5; 11	3.6; 0	2.3; 0	0.9; 1	13.6
Sigma Dos/El Mundo	14–22 Jul 2025	1,250	?	48.7; 41/43	29.9; 23/25	11.8; 7/9	3.2; 0	2.1; 0	0.8; 0/1	18.8
EM-Analytics/Nós Diario	11–16 Jun 2025	700	?	? 39	? 28	? 7	–	–	? 1	?
NC Report/La Razón	16–31 May 2025	400	54.2	? 40	? 26	? 8	–	–	? 1	?
Sondaxe/La Voz de Galicia	5–13 Feb 2025	1,223	65.4	45.8; 40	31.9; 24	14.1; 10	–	–	1.0; 1	13.9
Sondaxe/La Voz de Galicia	29 Nov–9 Dec 2024	1,223	?	46.4; 40	32.6; 24	13.1; 10	–	–	0.9; 1	13.8
Sondaxe/La Voz de Galicia	24 Sep–2 Oct 2024	1,223	?	46.6; 40	32.9; 25	12.3; 9	–	–	0.9; 1	13.7
2024 EP election	9 Jun 2024	—N/a	42.0	43.6 (39)	16.1 (13)	27.0 (23)	4.4 (0)	2.1 (0)	–	16.6
2024 regional election	18 Feb 2024	—N/a	56.3	47.4; 40	31.3; 25	14.1; 9	2.3; 0	1.9; 0	1.0; 1	15.8

=== Voting preferences ===
The table below lists raw, unweighted voting preferences.

Polling firm/Commissioner	Fieldwork date	Sample size	PP	BNG	PSdeG–PSOE	Vox	Sumar	DO	Podemos	Question	X mark	Lead
CIS	7–31 Mar 2025	1,151	29.5	25.3	21.1	1.9	1.2	–	0.8	14.2	3.1	4.2
2024 EP election (Note: Does not include non-resident citizens.)	9 Jun 2024	—N/a	21.9	8.1	13.6	2.2	1.0	–	1.0	—N/a	49.5	8.3
2024 regional election	18 Feb 2024	—N/a	31.6	21.1	9.4	1.5	1.3	0.7	0.2	—N/a	32.7	10.5

=== Preferred President ===
The table below lists opinion polling on leader preferences to become president of the Regional Government of Galicia.

Polling firm/Commissioner	Fieldwork date	Sample size					Other/ None/ Not care	Question	Lead
Polling firm/Commissioner	Fieldwork date	Sample size	Rueda PP	Feijóo PP	Pontón BNG	Besteiro PSdeG	Other/ None/ Not care	Question	Lead
CIS (Note: Responses denoting a party's generic candidate are aggregated to that party's main candidate/leader at the time of the poll.)	7–31 Mar 2025	1,151	32.9	1.2	21.9	9.6	5.0	29.4	11.0

== Bibliography ==
- Ley Orgánica 1/1981, de 6 de abril, de Estatuto de Autonomía para Galicia (Organic Law 1/1981). Official State Gazette (in Spanish). 6 April 1981 [version as of 28 December 2022]. BOE-A-1981-9564.
- Ley 1/1983, de 22 de febrero, reguladora de la Junta y su Presidente (Law 1/1983). Official State Gazette (in Spanish). 22 February 1983 [version as of 4 September 2015]. BOE-A-1983-23788.
- Ley Orgánica 5/1985, de 19 de junio, del Régimen Electoral General (Organic Law 5/1985). Official State Gazette (in Spanish). 19 June 1985 [version as of 2 July 2026]. BOE-A-1985-11672.
- Ley 8/1985, de 13 de agosto, de elecciones al Parlamento de Galicia (Law 8/1985). Official State Gazette (in Spanish). 13 August 1985 [version as of 31 August 2015]. BOE-A-1985-21380.
