= Leadership opinion polling for the November 2019 Spanish general election =

In the run up to the November 2019 Spanish general election, various organisations carried out opinion polling to gauge the opinions that voters hold towards political leaders. Results of such polls are displayed in this article. The date range for these opinion polls is from the previous general election, held on 28 April 2019, to the day the next election was held, on 10 November 2019.

== Preferred prime minister ==
The table below lists opinion polling on leader preferences to become prime minister.

Color key:

Poll conducted after legal ban on opinion polls

Polling firm/Commissioner	Fieldwork date	Sample size							Other/ None/ Not care	Question	Lead
Polling firm/Commissioner	Fieldwork date	Sample size	Sánchez PSOE	Casado PP	Rivera Cs	Iglesias Podemos	Abascal Vox	Errejón Más País	Other/ None/ Not care	Question	Lead
GESOP/El Periòdic	7–9 Nov 2019	903	26.7	16.5	5.0	15.0	10.5	5.6	15.6	5.0	10.2
CIS	28 Oct–9 Nov 2019	4,805	27.0	13.0	6.1	11.1	6.7	3.8	23.1	9.3	14.0
GESOP/El Periòdic	6–8 Nov 2019	903	27.9	15.8	4.4	14.1	11.2	5.7	14.2	6.9	12.1
GESOP/El Periòdic	5–7 Nov 2019	904	27.0	15.9	4.4	13.4	11.8	4.6	16.0	6.9	11.1
GESOP/El Periòdic	4–6 Nov 2019	905	28.3	14.7	5.2	11.8	11.1	5.4	17.1	6.1	13.6
GESOP/El Periòdic	3–5 Nov 2019	904	29.8	13.2	5.9	11.7	11.7	5.3	16.4	6.0	16.6
GESOP/El Periòdic	31 Oct–4 Nov 2019	861	30.8	12.9	7.4	11.6	10.8	6.3	14.4	5.8	17.9
SW Demoscopia/infoLibre	28 Oct–2 Nov 2019	1,517	35.2	20.1	5.8	9.1	9.4	3.0	17.4		15.1
GESOP/El Periódico	28–31 Oct 2019	1,504	30.8	12.7	9.2	13.1	8.5	7.2	12.0	6.5	17.7
SocioMétrica/El Español	14–18 Oct 2019	?	21.7	16.7	11.3	10.2	9.8	7.6	22.7	–	5.0
CIS	21 Sep–13 Oct 2019	17,650	28.3	11.6	7.0	8.1	4.2	2.7	27.0	11.1	16.7
GESOP/El Periódico	30 Sep–3 Oct 2019	1,005	29.3	13.8	9.9	11.7	6.4	7.3	12.9	8.7	15.5
GAD3/La Vanguardia	16–20 Sep 2019	1,006	32.2	13.2	10.2	7.7	5.6	–	31.0		19.0
CIS	1–18 Sep 2019	5,906	32.4	9.8	9.0	9.9	4.4	–	26.1	8.4	22.5
CIS	1–11 Jul 2019	2,952	36.5	10.0	10.5	8.8	3.6	–	22.8	7.7	26.0
CIS	1–11 Jun 2019	2,974	37.0	8.8	12.6	7.6	3.2	–	20.4	10.4	24.4
CIS	1–11 May 2019	2,985	39.6	7.4	13.3	10.6	3.1	–	18.1	7.9	26.3
Invymark/laSexta	29 Apr–3 May 2019	?	46.4	16.5	14.9	11.8	3.8	–	–	6.6	29.9

== Leader ratings ==
The table below lists opinion polling on leader ratings, on a 0–10 scale: 0 would stand for a "terrible" rating, whereas 10 would stand for "excellent".

Polling firm/Commissioner	Fieldwork date	Sample size						
Polling firm/Commissioner	Fieldwork date	Sample size	Sánchez PSOE	Casado PP	Rivera Cs	Iglesias UP	Abascal Vox	Errejón Más País
SW Demoscopia/infoLibre	28 Oct–2 Nov 2019	1,517	4.12	3.68	3.01	2.96	2.43	2.96
Sondaxe/La Voz de Galicia	28–31 Oct 2019	1,001	4.01	3.64	3.31	3.34	2.76	3.37
GESOP/El Periódico	28–31 Oct 2019	1,504	4.3	3.9	3.6	3.9	3.0	4.2
Sigma Dos/El Mundo	24–31 Oct 2019	1,800	3.86	3.75	3.49	3.38	3.15	3.51
DYM/Prensa Ibérica	25–30 Oct 2019	1,005	3.6	3.3	3.1	3.1	2.7	3.5
Ipsos/Henneo	28–29 Oct 2019	2,000	3.60	3.60	3.20	3.20	2.90	3.70
40 dB/El País (Note: Data adjusted to account for a 0–10 scale.)	23–29 Oct 2019	2,002	4.2	3.8	3.8	3.8	3.2	4.2
Sigma Dos/El Mundo	21–29 Oct 2019	1,800	3.89	3.73	3.45	3.35	3.17	3.52
Sigma Dos/Antena 3	27 Oct 2019	?	3.93	3.62	3.35	3.45	2.97	3.75
Sigma Dos/El Mundo	16–24 Oct 2019	1,600	3.79	3.66	3.38	3.28	3.08	3.51
Sigma Dos/El Mundo	11–22 Oct 2019	1,600	3.78	3.62	3.29	3.24	2.97	3.49
SocioMétrica/El Español	14–18 Oct 2019	?	3.2	3.1	2.8	2.4	2.7	2.9
Sigma Dos/El Mundo	10–17 Oct 2019	1,600	3.76	3.56	3.28	3.26	2.93	3.52
Sigma Dos/El Mundo	7–15 Oct 2019	1,600	3.79	3.54	3.23	3.28	2.86	3.52
CIS	21 Sep–13 Oct 2019	17,650	4.0	3.1	3.0	2.9	2.2	3.0
Celeste-Tel/eldiario.es	7–11 Oct 2019	1,100	4.1	3.8	3.2	3.1	2.0	2.7
Sigma Dos/El Mundo	2–10 Oct 2019	1,600	3.71	3.52	3.27	3.23	2.79	3.38
Sigma Dos/El Mundo	30 Sep–8 Oct 2019	1,600	3.70	3.61	3.35	3.20	2.86	3.62
Celeste-Tel/eldiario.es	1–4 Oct 2019	1,100	4.2	3.7	3.4	3.1	2.0	2.9
GESOP/El Periódico	30 Sep–3 Oct 2019	1,005	4.3	3.8	3.6	3.7	2.7	4.2
Sigma Dos/El Mundo	30 Sep–2 Oct 2019	1,000	3.79	3.61	3.38	3.31	2.85	3.96
Sondaxe/La Voz de Galicia	23–26 Sep 2019	1,001	4.86	3.94	3.65	3.79	2.62	–
40 dB/El País	18–20 Sep 2019	1,544	4.3	3.8	4.0	3.7	3.3	–
GAD3/La Vanguardia	16–20 Sep 2019	1,006	4.0	3.7	3.3	3.0	2.7	–
Invymark/laSexta	16–20 Sep 2019	?	4.37	3.40	3.51	2.99	2.17	–
CIS	1–18 Sep 2019	5,906	4.3	3.1	3.2	3.1	2.2	–
Invymark/laSexta	2–6 Sep 2019	?	4.50	3.30	3.65	3.36	2.14	–
SocioMétrica/El Español	27–30 Aug 2019	1,100	3.3	2.8	2.9	2.8	–	–
Sigma Dos/El Mundo	27–29 Aug 2019	1,000	4.18	3.38	3.20	3.18	2.50	–
Invymark/laSexta	29 Jul–1 Aug 2019	?	5.02	3.22	3.70	3.71	1.77	–
SocioMétrica/El Español	25–26 Jul 2019	1,000	3.4	2.9	3.1	2.5	2.8	–
Invymark/laSexta	15–19 Jul 2019	?	5.20	3.15	3.71	3.94	1.75	–
CIS	1–11 Jul 2019	2,952	4.6	3.1	3.4	3.3	2.3	–
Invymark/laSexta	3–6 Jul 2019	1,200	5.4	3.1	3.9	3.8	1.9	–
Sigma Dos/El Mundo	21 Jun 2019	1,000	4.98	3.54	3.57	3.52	2.59	–
Invymark/laSexta	17–21 Jun 2019	?	5.48	3.31	3.99	3.84	2.06	–
CIS	1–11 Jun 2019	2,974	4.8	3.4	3.8	3.4	2.6	–

== Approval ratings ==
The tables below list the public approval ratings of the leaders and leading candidates of the main political parties in Spain.

=== Pedro Sánchez ===
Polling firm/Commissioner	Fieldwork date	Sample size	Pedro Sánchez (PSOE)			
Polling firm/Commissioner	Fieldwork date	Sample size	check	X mark	Question	Net
Simple Lógica	1–4 Oct 2019	1,046	25.0	68.0	7.0	−43.0
Simple Lógica	2–6 Sep 2019	1,089	30.1	62.3	7.6	−32.2
SocioMétrica/El Español	27–30 Aug 2019	1,100	28.3	?	?	−?
Simple Lógica	1–5 Aug 2019	1,074	38.0	54.7	7.4	−16.7
Metroscopia/Henneo	11–12 Jul 2019	1,251	50.0	48.0	2.0	+2.0
Simple Lógica	1–9 Jul 2019	1,037	46.1	45.4	8.4	+0.7
Simple Lógica	3–11 Jun 2019	1,090	49.0	42.0	9.0	+7.0
Simple Lógica	6–14 May 2019	1,058	52.2	40.4	7.4	+11.8

=== Pablo Casado ===
Polling firm/Commissioner	Fieldwork date	Sample size	Pablo Casado (PP)			
Polling firm/Commissioner	Fieldwork date	Sample size	check	X mark	Question	Net
Simple Lógica	1–4 Oct 2019	1,046	17.5	74.1	8.4	−56.6
Simple Lógica	2–6 Sep 2019	1,089	17.4	75.1	7.6	−57.7
SocioMétrica/El Español	27–30 Aug 2019	1,100	22.5	?	?	−?
Simple Lógica	1–5 Aug 2019	1,074	17.3	74.5	8.2	−57.2
Metroscopia/Henneo	11–12 Jul 2019	1,251	27.0	70.0	3.0	−43.0
Simple Lógica	1–9 Jul 2019	1,037	16.0	75.2	8.8	−59.2
Simple Lógica	3–11 Jun 2019	1,090	15.8	74.0	10.2	−58.2
Simple Lógica	6–14 May 2019	1,058	18.1	75.0	6.9	−56.9

=== Albert Rivera ===
Polling firm/Commissioner	Fieldwork date	Sample size	Albert Rivera (Cs)			
Polling firm/Commissioner	Fieldwork date	Sample size	check	X mark	Question	Net
Simple Lógica	1–4 Oct 2019	1,046	19.1	72.4	8.5	−53.3
Simple Lógica	2–6 Sep 2019	1,089	20.4	72.0	7.6	−51.6
SocioMétrica/El Español	27–30 Aug 2019	1,100	23.9	66.0	10.1	−42.1
Simple Lógica	1–5 Aug 2019	1,074	20.9	71.9	7.3	−51.0
Metroscopia/Henneo	11–12 Jul 2019	1,251	30.0	68.0	2.0	−38.0
Simple Lógica	1–9 Jul 2019	1,037	23.4	68.8	7.8	−45.4
Simple Lógica	3–11 Jun 2019	1,090	30.1	59.6	10.3	−29.5
Simple Lógica	6–14 May 2019	1,058	35.6	57.4	7.0	−21.8

=== Pablo Iglesias ===
Polling firm/Commissioner	Fieldwork date	Sample size	Pablo Iglesias (Unidas Podemos)			
Polling firm/Commissioner	Fieldwork date	Sample size	check	X mark	Question	Net
Simple Lógica	1–4 Oct 2019	1,046	17.2	74.9	7.9	−57.7
Simple Lógica	2–6 Sep 2019	1,089	21.2	71.1	7.7	−49.9
SocioMétrica/El Español	27–30 Aug 2019	1,100	22.5	?	?	−?
Simple Lógica	1–5 Aug 2019	1,074	21.1	71.8	7.1	−50.7
Metroscopia/Henneo	11–12 Jul 2019	1,251	32.0	67.0	1.0	−35.0
Simple Lógica	1–9 Jul 2019	1,037	26.7	64.7	8.5	−38.0
Simple Lógica	3–11 Jun 2019	1,090	27.6	63.1	9.3	−35.5
Simple Lógica	6–14 May 2019	1,058	38.1	54.4	7.5	−16.3

=== Santiago Abascal ===
Polling firm/Commissioner	Fieldwork date	Sample size	Santiago Abascal (Vox)			
Polling firm/Commissioner	Fieldwork date	Sample size	check	X mark	Question	Net
Simple Lógica	1–4 Oct 2019	1,046	12.2	78.1	9.8	−65.9
Simple Lógica	2–6 Sep 2019	1,089	15.0	74.9	10.1	−59.9
SocioMétrica/El Español	27–30 Aug 2019	1,100	21.8	?	?	−?
Simple Lógica	1–5 Aug 2019	1,074	14.0	76.6	9.4	−62.6
Metroscopia/Henneo	11–12 Jul 2019	1,251	16.0	78.0	6.0	−62.0
Simple Lógica	1–9 Jul 2019	1,037	10.4	80.2	9.4	−69.8
Simple Lógica	3–11 Jun 2019	1,090	13.9	73.8	12.3	−59.9
Simple Lógica	6–14 May 2019	1,058	12.6	77.9	9.5	−65.3
