= Verónica Martínez Barbero =

Spanish politician, lawyer, and labour inspector (born 1980)

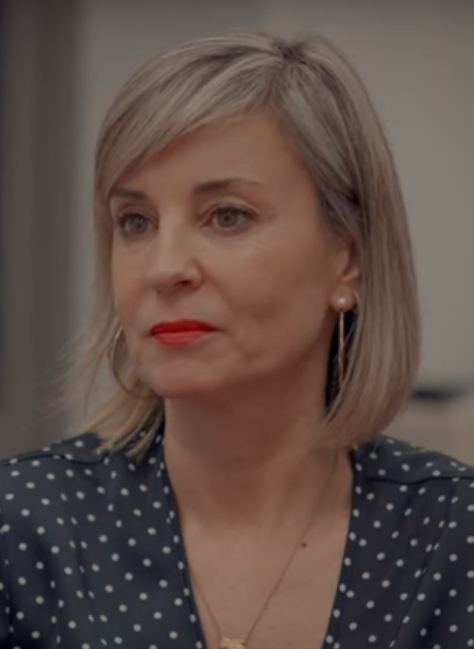
- Martínez Barbero in 2024

Spokesperson of the Sumar Parliamentary Group
- Incumbent
- Assumed office 6 November 2024
- Preceded by: Íñigo Errejón

Member of the Congress of Deputies
- Incumbent
- Assumed office 17 August 2023
- Constituency: Pontevedra

Director General of Labour
- In office 29 January 2020 – 13 June 2023
- Preceded by: Ángel Allué
- Succeeded by: Ricardo Morón

Personal details
- Born: Verónica Martínez Barbero; 2 February 1980 (age 46) Gijón, Spain
- Party: Movimiento Sumar (since 2023)
- Education: University of Oviedo (LL.B., BBA)
- Occupation: Labour inspector; lawyer; politician

Verónica Martínez Barbero (born 2 February 1980) is a Spanish politician, lawyer, and labour inspector who has served as the spokesperson for the Sumar parliamentary group in the Congress of Deputies since November 2024. She previously served as Director General of Labour in the Ministry of Labour and Social Economy from 2020 to 2023 under Yolanda Díaz. She has been a member of the Congress of Deputies representing Pontevedra since August 2023.

Martínez Barbero succeeded Íñigo Errejón as spokesperson following his resignation amid sexual assault allegations in October 2024. A career civil servant and labour law specialist, she joined the Superior Corps of Labour and Social Security Inspectors in 2006 and served as President of the Galician Council of Labour Relations from 2017 to 2020.

== Early life and education ==
Verónica Martínez Barbero was born on 2 February 1980 in Gijón, Asturias, Spain. She graduated with degrees in Law and Business Administration from the University of Oviedo.

== Career ==
=== Civil service ===
In 2006, Martínez Barbero joined the Superior Corps of Labour and Social Security Inspectors through competitive examination. Since 2008, she has performed mediation and arbitration tasks within the Galician Interprofessional Agreement on Extrajudicial Procedures for Labour Conflict Resolution (AGA).

From 2017, she served as President of the Galician Council of Labour Relations, a position dependent on the Xunta de Galicia. She also worked as a lecturer at the School of Labour Relations in A Coruña.

=== Business ventures ===
In December 2015, Martínez Barbero co-founded Novovinilo Edicións, a publishing company based in Vigo, which remained active for several years.

=== Political career ===
==== Director General of Labour ====
In January 2020, Martínez Barbero was appointed Director General of Labour in the Ministry of Labour and Social Economy under Minister Yolanda Díaz. In this role, she was involved in key labour reforms and policies during the COVID-19 pandemic in Spain.

She resigned from the position on 13 June 2023 to lead the Sumar electoral list for Pontevedra in the 2023 Spanish general election.

==== Member of Congress ====
Following the 2023 Spanish general election, Martínez Barbero became a member of the Congress of Deputies representing Pontevedra, taking office on 17 August 2023. As a parliamentarian, she serves as spokesperson for the Labour Committee and chairs the Social Rights Committee. She was instrumental in promoting the recently approved ALS Law.

==== Spokesperson of Sumar ====
On 6 November 2024, Martínez Barbero was unanimously selected by all forces within the Sumar parliamentary group to serve as spokesperson, succeeding Íñigo Errejón who had resigned on 24 October 2024 following sexual assault allegations. She officially assumed the role on 14 November 2024.

Her appointment was part of a broader restructuring of responsibilities within the parliamentary group, with an agreement to establish a coordination space where all political forces participate on equal terms. She becomes the third spokesperson for Sumar in the current legislature, following Marta Lois and Errejón.

== Personal life ==
Martínez Barbero is married to a spokesperson for the General Union of Workers (UGT). She is known to be an enthusiast of speleology. She describes herself as "Asturian, very Galician" and is a mother.

== Electoral history ==
Election	Constituency	Party	Votes	%	Result
2023	Pontevedra	Sumar			Elected
