= Íñigo Errejón =

Spanish politician (born 1983)

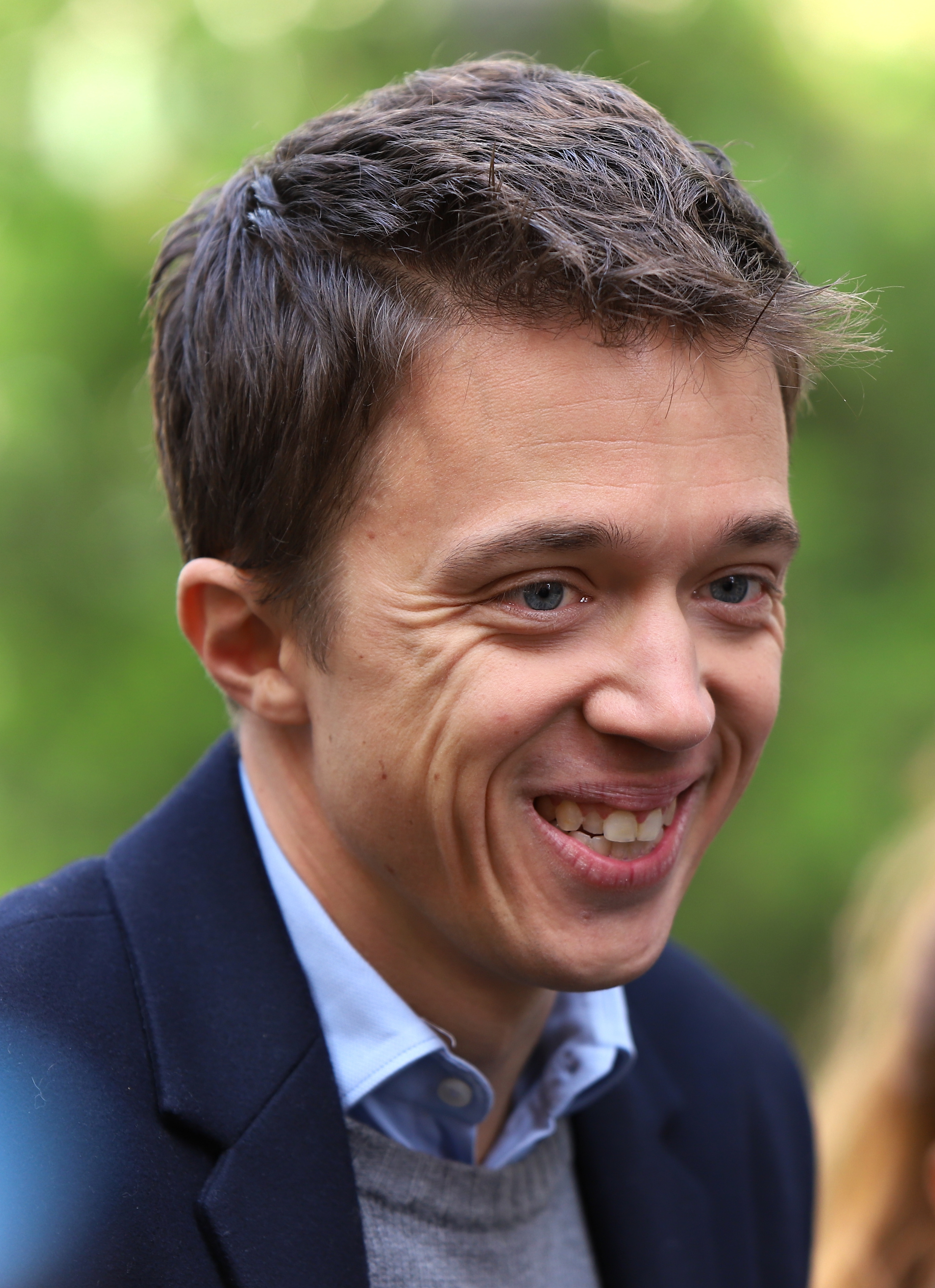
- Íñigo Errejón in November 2019

Spokesperson of Sumar in the Congress of Deputies
- In office 30 January 2024 – 24 October 2024
- Preceded by: Marta Lois
- Succeeded by: Verónica Martínez Barbero

Member of the Congress of Deputies
- In office 3 December 2019 – 24 October 2024
- Constituency: Madrid
- In office 7 January 2016 – 21 January 2019
- Constituency: Madrid

Member of the Assembly of Madrid
- In office 11 June 2019 – 11 November 2019

Personal details
- Born: Íñigo Errejón Galván; 14 December 1983 (age 42) Madrid, Spain
- Party: Podemos (2014–2019); Más Madrid (2019); Más País (2019–2023); Movimiento Sumar (2023–2024)
- Education: Complutense University of Madrid
- Occupation: Researcher, politician, political strategist

Íñigo Errejón Galván (Spanish pronunciation: [ˈiɲiɣo ereˈxoŋ galˈβan]; (Note: In isolation, Errejón is pronounced [ereˈxon].) born 14 December 1983) is a Spanish political scientist and former politician.

Doctor of Philosophy in Political Science, he was the secretary for policy and strategy and campaigning of Podemos (managing several electoral campaigns of the political party) as well as a member of the 11th and 12th terms of the Congress of Deputies. He split from Podemos and founded a new platform in early 2019, Más Madrid, under which Errejón was elected to the Assembly of Madrid and that was later re-constituted as Más País in order to run in the November 2019 general election, with the outcome of Errejón returning to the Congress of Deputies. He left politics in October 2024 after being accused of sexual assault.

From the standpoint of political theory, he is influenced by Ernesto Laclau and the Essex School of discourse analysis.

== Biography ==
=== Early life and education ===
Born on 14 December 1983 in Madrid, Íñigo Errejón is the son of José Antonio Errejón Villacieros (a public servant in the Spanish Central Administration who held senior positions in different ministries) and María de los Ángeles Galván (a biologist). His father, a Marxist who had been a member of the Workers' Party, became one of the signatories of the 1983 Tenerife Manifesto (the text which marked the birth of the Greens in Spain) and much later in time, also a member of Izquierda Anticapitalista (IZAN).

Errejón was a scout during his teenage years. Initially close to the political tradition of libertarian Marxism, Errejón started his political activity as activist in the "Colectivo 1984" in Pozuelo de Alarcón. In 2006, he helped to found Contrapoder, a student association described as anticapitalist or anti-establishment. (Note: Among other actions, the association protested against a panel at the UCM in which Rosa Díez intervened and invited Evo Morales to give a conference in the Faculty of Political Science.)

He studied at the Complutense University of Madrid (UCM), where he earned a licentiate degree in Political Science in 2006. During his time at university, he was a part of social movements linked to civil disobedience in Madrid. (Note: According to Pablo Iglesias, his testimonies (along those of Daniel Córdoba) are "very useful" to account for the anti-globalization protests in Genoa (July 2001, against the meeting of the G8), Prague (September 2000, during the annual meeting of the board of governors of the IMF and World Bank) and Scotland (July 2005, against a new meeting of the G8) as well as the mobilizations against the Iraq War and the protests of 13 March 2004 in front of the headquarters of the People's Party in Madrid after the 11-M attacks.)

While preparing his doctoral thesis, Errejón stayed at the University of California, Los Angeles from 2007 to 2008 (under a visit coordinated by John Agnew), the University of Bologna (2010) and the Instituto de Altos Estudios Nacionales in Ecuador (2011). In 2012, he earned a PhD degree in Political Science after writing a dissertation titled La lucha por la hegemonía durante el primer gobierno del MAS en Bolivia (2006-2009): un análisis discursivo, dealing with the political discourse during the first mandate in power of Bolivia's Movement for Socialism (MAS), and supervised by Heriberto Cairo Carou.

Errejón began working for Center for Political and Social Studies Foundation (CEPS), a socialist, anti-capitalist think tank in Spain that performed the majority of its work in Latin America. He worked as a secretary for CEPS and was a member of its executive board. He also collaborated with the GIS XXI Foundation (a polling firm linked to the Venezuelan government) and was appointed as director of its Political Identities research line. He later became a member of Consultative Board of the Strategic Latin American Centre of Geopolitics (CELAG). (Note: Back in 2015, the diary ABC accused Podemos members Juan Carlos Monedero and Errejón of "working" (suggesting a paid remuneration) for the CELAG. Podemos refuted the latter extent arguing that, as members of the Consultative Board, they did not earn a remuneration.)

He was a member of the editorial board of the political analysis journal Viento Sur, linked to IZAN.

=== Podemos ===
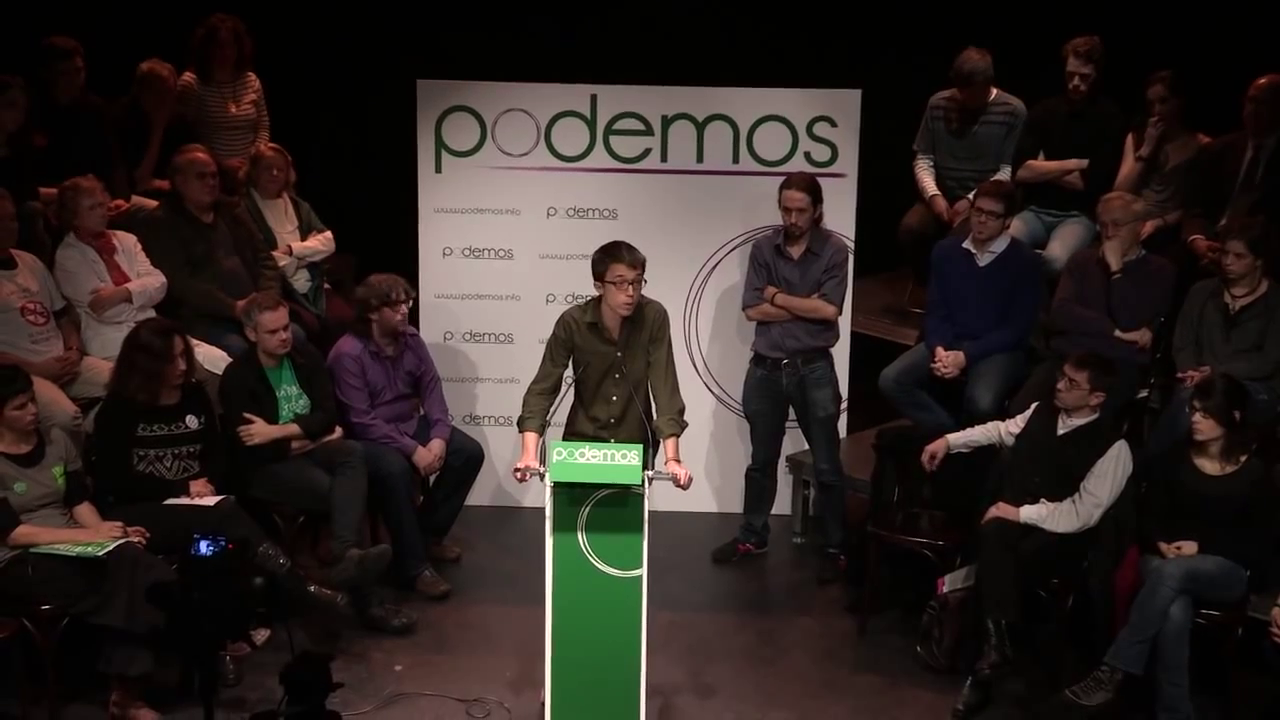
Errejón at the presentation of Podemos in January 2014 in Madrid.

In 2014, Pablo Iglesias appointed Errejón as campaign manager for Podemos in the European Parliament elections of 2014. The campaign was a success, and the new party won 1.2 million votes.

Errejón himself became one of the most prominent Podemos politicians in terms of public profile, featuring in TV shows like La Sexta noche. On 15 November 2014, he was chosen as one of the 11 members of the Council of Coordination of Podemos, commissioned to the post of Secretary of Policy of the party executive board.

By late 2014 Errejón faced public scrutiny and criticism as he had allegedly breached the conditions of his contract as a researcher at the University of Málaga (UMA), as the latter demanded physical presence and reportedly Errejón did not attend the UMA. Concerns on the incompatibility of his job as researcher with other paid activities (such as campaign manager) also appeared. While his supervisor (fellow Podemos board member Alberto Montero) alleged Errejón had verbal permission to work long distance, an investigation by the UMA was opened, with the UMA announcing it would suspend Errejón's salary in December 2014. (Note: According to Podemos, the case was a "campaign of defamation" against Errejón for being one of the most visible faces of the party, now an emerging political force. The Podemos spokesman for Relations with Civil Society and Social Movements, Rafael Mayoral, even hinted that pressure from the Andalusian regional government could have influenced the decision taken against Errejón. Elena Cortés, a member of the Andalusian regional government demanded Mayoral to provide evidence for the alleged interferences.) However, eventually no disciplinary sanction was actually enforced by the UMA on Errejón, as Errejón had already asked that the contract not be renewed.

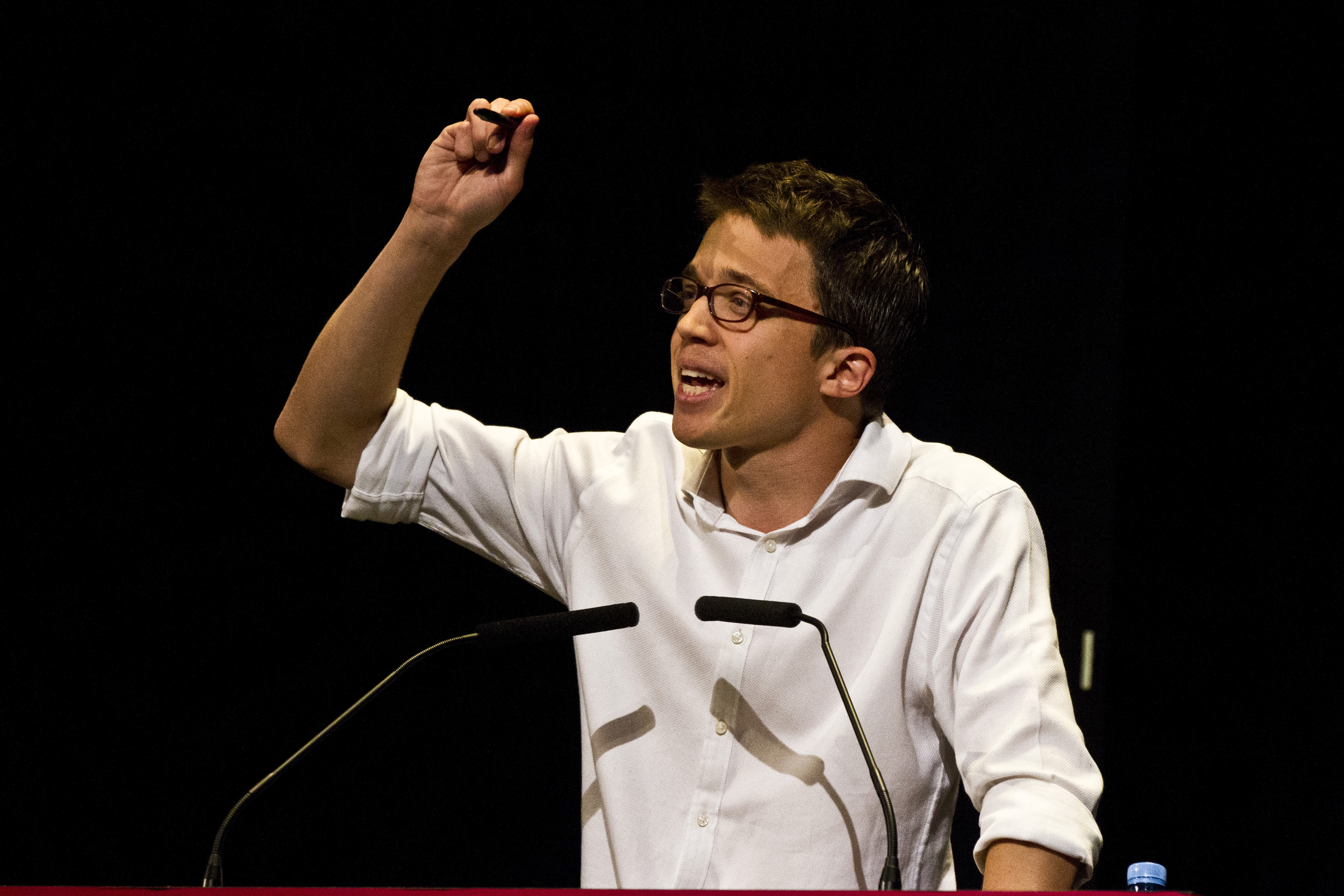
Errejón at the 2015 International Forum for Empowerment and Equality, held in Buenos Aires.

Errejón was the campaign manager for Podemos in the Andalusian parliamentary elections of 22 March 2015, in which the party won 15 seats. In the same month, he participated as a speaker at the International Forum for Empowerment and Equality, held in Buenos Aires. He was also campaign manager for the regional elections on 24 May that year.

Errejón ran as a candidate for Podemos in the December 2015 general election, and was included third in the party list for the Lower House in the constituency of Madrid. Elected as a member of the Congress of Deputies, he joined the Committee on Finance and Public Administrations. He also became the Spokesperson of the Podemos parliamentary group (effectively number 2 in the parliamentary group after Iglesias). As no government could be formed during the 11th term of the Cortes Generales, a new general election for was called for June 2016. Errejón ran third as candidate to the Congress in the Unidos Podemos list, a coalition between Podemos, United Left (IU) and other left-wing parties. The 2016 election brought a breaking point in Podemos as both Iglesias and Errejón deemed the results of the election as a failure, but because of different strategical reasons; Errejón in particular resented the defence of Iglesias had made of the alliance with IU. Errejón became the Spokesperson of the Unidos Podemos-En Comú Podem-En Marea Confederal Parliamentary Group. During the 12th Congress of Deputies, he also joined the Constitutional Committee (in which he held the role of spokesperson of his parliamentary group) as well as the Committee on Finance and Public Function, the Committee on Finance and Public Administrations and the temporary Committee on the investigation of the alleged illegal funding of the People's Party.

From December 2016 to February 2017 the 2nd Podemos Citizen Assembly ("Vistalegre II") took place. Errejón did not bid for the party leadership (with Iglesias standing as candidate for Secretary-General with the single alternative candidacy of Juan Moreno Yagüe) but presented a project (Recuperar la Ilusión) competing with another two alternatives (around Iglesias and Anticapitalistas, respectively) in the matter of the composition of the State Citizen Council and the voting of several party documents. Iglesias confirmed his role as Secretary General and his platform commanded a qualified majority in the voting of the composition of the State Citizen Council, with Errejón's project obtaining roughly one third of the votes. Iglesias thus imposed his vision and project in the party, in what it was considered then a triumph of the more left-wing faction of Podemos. Just after Vistalegre II, Errejón was demoted from the position of Spokesperson of the Parliamentary Group in the Congress of Deputies and replaced by Irene Montero.

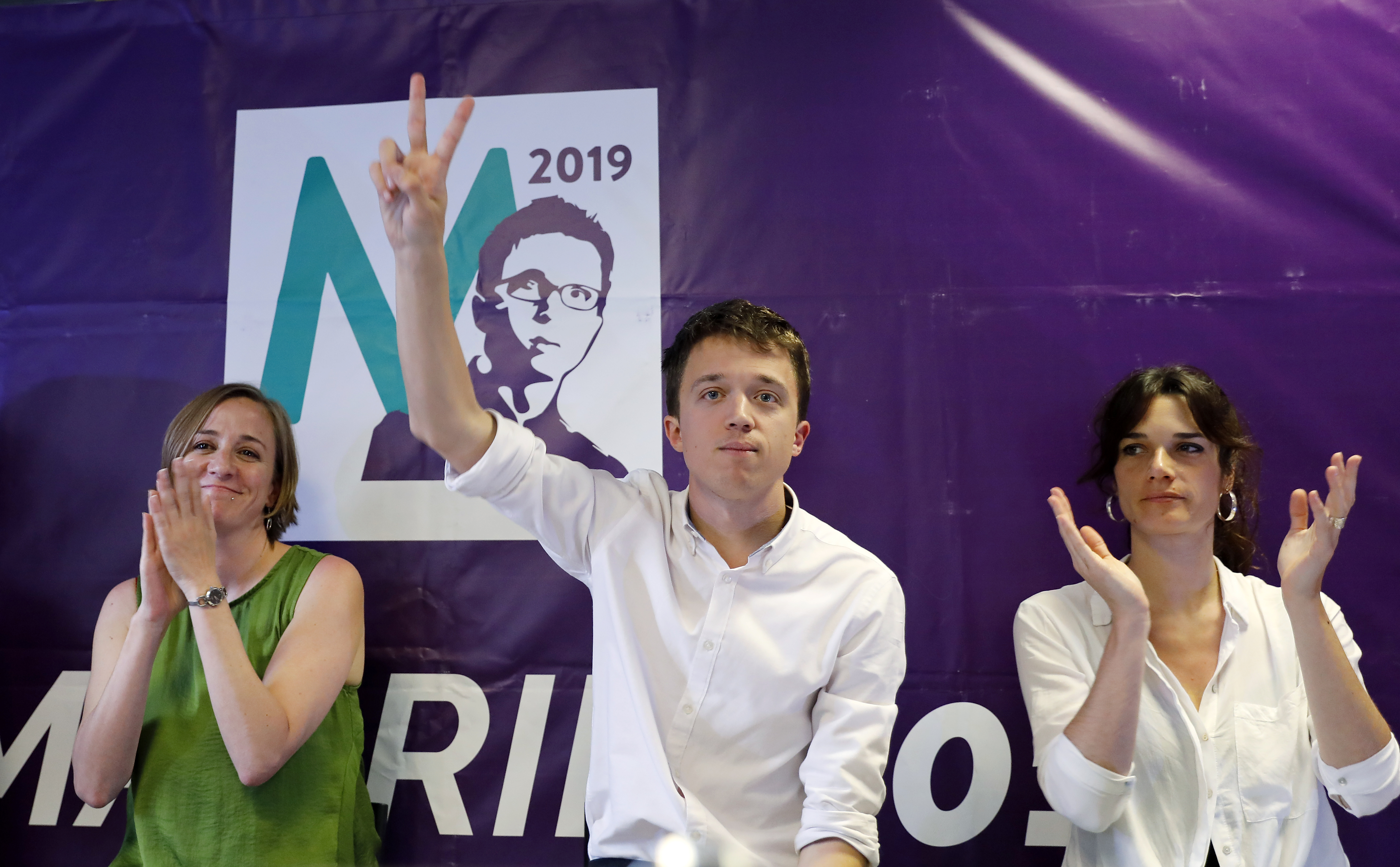
Errejón in May 2018, next to Tania Sánchez and Clara Serra.

In May 2018 Errejón launched a bid for the primary election to determine the Podemos list for the May 2019 Madrilenian regional election under the Sí Madrid 2019 platform. Run as the party-liner candidacy, with no credible rival, it commanded a 98% of support from the party members.

In January 2019, Errejón announced he would run in the regional election under the Más Madrid list, the platform previously presented by Manuela Carmena (the Mayor of Madrid) in order to run in the municipal election (both the regional and municipal elections were to be celebrated on 26 May). While the initiative of Más Madrid was purposely open to further negotiation to include Podemos in some form (it was framed by Errejón as an "invitation" rather than as a "split"), this formal unlinking from the party unleashed an internal crisis in Podemos. The crisis' toll took Ramón Espinar (the regional leader of Podemos in Madrid), who quit frontline politics in disagreement with the decision taken by Iglesias of actually presenting an alternative list to Errejón's in the regional election (Podemos had convened not to present an alternative list to Carmena's vis-à-vis the municipal election). Errejón was then asked to leave his seat of deputy, and he (still leaving a door open to reach a unitary list of Más Madrid with Podemos, IU and Equo) quit the Congress of Deputies on 21 January.

=== Más Madrid and Más País ===
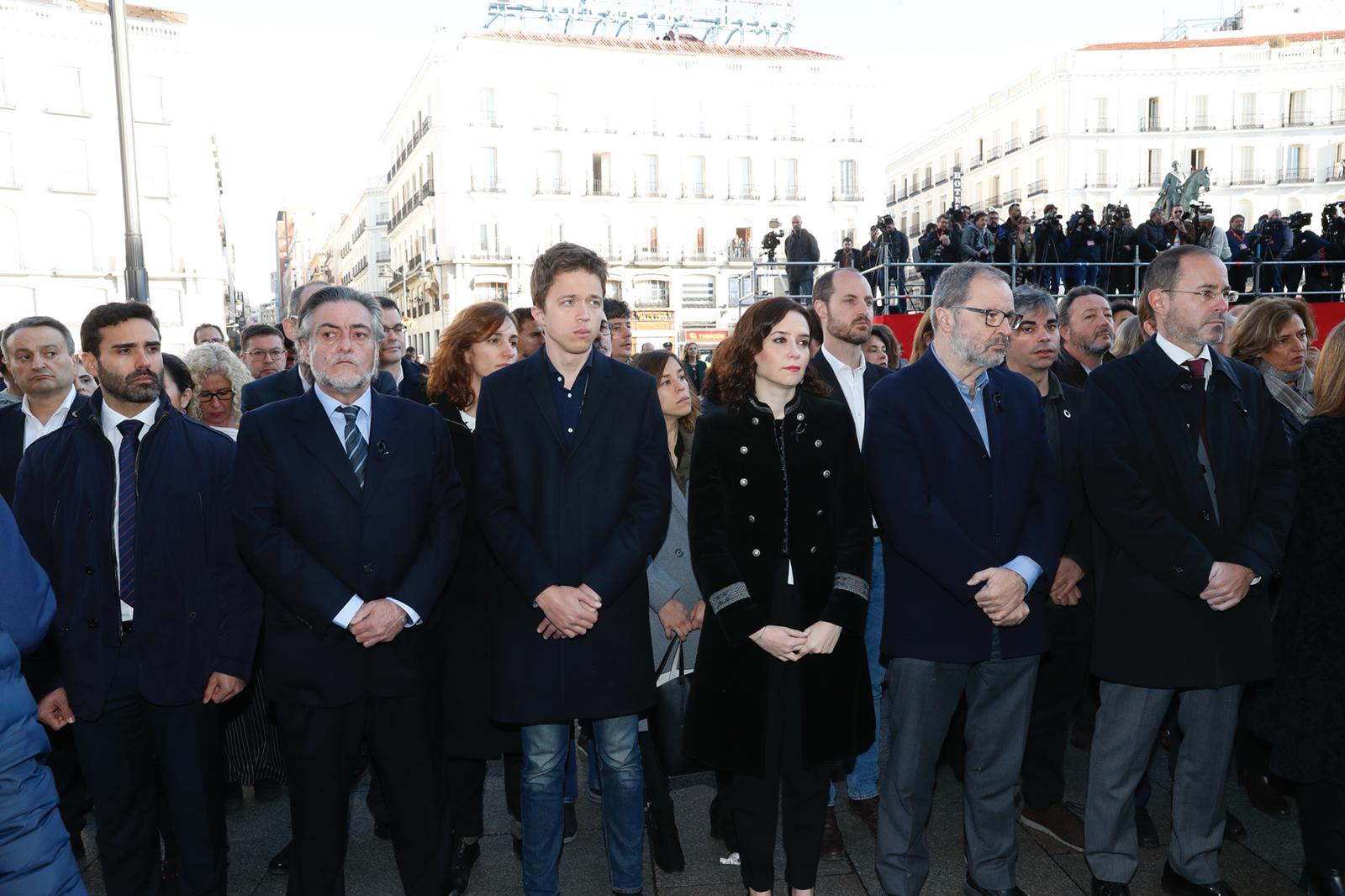
Errejón along other regional legislators and municipal councillors at the Puerta del Sol in March 2019, during an act of remembrance of the victims of the 11-M train-bombings.

Íñigo Errejón contested the 24 May regional election in Madrid as head of the Más Madrid list (also postulating himself as prospective candidate to become the President of the Community of Madrid). The Más Madrid list obtained a 14.69% of the valid votes, earning 20 seats of the 11th term of the Assembly of Madrid, while the list led by Podemos (Unidas Podemos Izquierda Unida Madrid en Pie), obtained a hair over the 5% electoral threshold; the whole left-of-centre forces (including PSOE) fell again short of forming a left-wing majority in the regional parliament (with 64 out of 132 seats).

As negotiations between PSOE Unidas Podemos to form a coalition government presided by Pedro Sánchez after the April 2019 general election collapsed, a general election set for December 2019 was in the horizon. An alternative list vying to run in the new election around Más Madrid in order to break the deadlock was postulated. The initiative was approved by the party members during an informal assembly on 22 September 2019. Three days later the platform was launched under the name Más País and Errejón was elected to lead it, vowing "to be at the service of a progressive government". Más País later reached agreements to run in coalition with Compromís, Equo and Chunta Aragonesista in several constituencies.

The party coalition with Equo in Madrid obtained just two seats at the election, while the Compromís-dominated alliance in Valencia earned another seat. The Más País legislators, initially destined to join the Mixed Parliamentary Group, helped to create another miscellaneous group, the "Plural Parliamentary Group", merging with other legislators. On 7 January 2020, Errejón congratulated Sánchez and Iglesias during the former's investiture session as prime minister, as both have reached a government coalition agreement, and warned that the action of the new government should not be directed against the opposition right-wing forces in the upcoming legislative term, as it would then buy the right-wing argument of Spain being split in two, rather than what Errejón thought it was actually the case (that "Spain is divided by inequality"). He then proceeded to vote 'yes' in the second round of the investiture.

On 24 October 2024, Errejón announced his retirement from politics, writing a statement in which he admitted to "mistakes". This followed journalist Cristina Fallarás writing about another woman allegedly suffering sexual violence from a "well-known politician who lives in Madrid". After the resignation, actress Elisa Mouliaá announced that she had reported Errejón to the police for an alleged sexual assault in September 2021.

== Ideology and stances ==
According to Chazel and Fernández, Errejón transitioned from the anarchist and libertarian sensibilities of his youth to an interest in Latin American populism, displaying a convergence toward the Essex School of discourse analysis in his PhD dissertation, underpinning the intellectual goal of the creation of hegemony through discourse. A follower of Ernesto Laclau (whom he has explicitly cited several times as leading intellectual reference) and Chantal Mouffe, Errejón has been considered as the "most forthcoming" figure in Podemos when it came to embrace the party as populist. According to Franzé, rather than as antagonism between already existing actors, Errejón would understand populism as a reconfiguration of the legitimate demos.

Errejón was a supporter of the figure of Hugo Chávez (whom he deemed a "source of political pedagogy"), and an early defender of the Venezuelan bolivarian experience (Venezuela was described by Errejón as "my adopted fatherland"). In a 2013 interview to Venezuelan newspaper Correo del Orinoco, Errejón got to the point of stating that the lines for food Venezuelans experienced for hours were "because they have more money to consume more" and that there was a "culture of queues" because Venezuelans supposedly enjoyed socialising. Spanish newspaper La Gaceta dismissed Errejón's statements as "absurd".

Errejón assured in a 2018 interview that the country had made "very important progress" and that "people eat three meals a day". When the interviewer pointed out that the population had lost "around 10 kilos on average in recent years", Errejón responded by saying "I don't have that data". However, the following year, he stated in another interview that "Venezuela is a disaster and it is obvious that I do not want that model for my country.

== Electoral history ==
Electoral history of Íñigo Errejón
Election	List	Constituency	List position	Result
Spanish general election, 2015	Podemos	Madrid	3rd (out of 36)	Elected
Spanish general election, 2016	Unidos Podemos	Madrid	3rd (out of 36)	Elected
Madrilenian regional election, 2019	Más Madrid	Madrid	1st (out of 132)	Elected
Spanish general election, November 2019	Más País-Equo	Madrid	1st (out of 37)	Elected
Spanish general election, 2023	Sumar	Madrid	4th (out of 37)	Elected

== Publications ==
- — (2012). La lucha por la hegemonía durante el primer gobierno del MAS en Bolivia (2006-2009): un análisis discursivo. Madrid: Universidad Complutense de Madrid. (PhD dissertation)
- Errejón, Íñigo; Mouffe, Chantal (2015). Construir Pueblo. Hegemonía y radicalización de la democracia. Barcelona: Icaria.
- García Linera, Álvaro; Errejón, Íñigo (2020). Qué horizonte. Hegemonía, Estado y revolución democrática. Madrid: Lengua de Trapo.
- Errejón, Íñigo; Serrano, Alfredo, eds. (2011). ¡Ahora es cuándo, carajo! Del asalto a la transformación del Estado en Bolivia. Barcelona: El Viejo Topo.

== Notes ==
Party political offices
Preceded by Position established	Political Secretary of Podemos; 2014–2017	Succeeded by Position abolished
Preceded by Position established	Leader of the Unidas Podemos Confederal Group in the Congress of Deputies; 2016-2017	Succeeded by Irene Montero
Preceded by Position established	Leader of the Más Madrid Group in the Assembly of Madrid; 2019	Succeeded by Pablo Gómez Perpinyà
