= Marta Lois =

Spanish politician (born 1969)

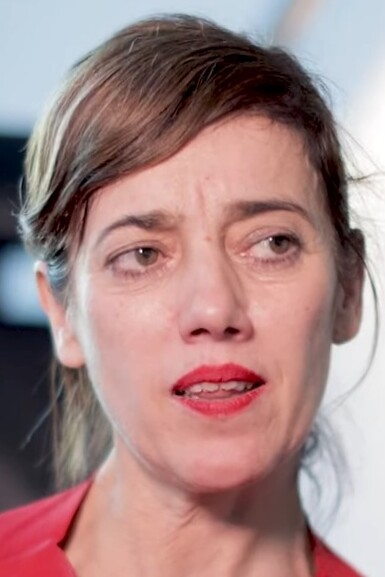
- Marta Lois in 2024

Spokesperson of Sumar in the Congress of Deputies
- In office 11 August 2023 – 30 January 2024
- Preceded by: Pablo Echenique (Unidas Podemos)
- Succeeded by: Íñigo Errejón

Member of the Congress of Deputies
- In office 17 August 2023 – 30 January 2024
- Constituency: A Coruña

Member of the Santiago de Compostela City Council
- In office 13 June 2015 – 17 June 2023

Personal details
- Born: Marta Irene Lois González; 1969 (age 56–57) Vigo, Spain
- Party: Compostela Aberta (2015–present); Movimiento Sumar (2023–present)
- Education: University of Santiago de Compostela

Marta Irene Lois González (born 1969) is a Spanish associate professor, political scientist and former politician of Sumar who served as its spokesperson in the Congress of Deputies between August 2023 and January 2024. Later, in December 2023, she was selected as the platform's candidate for the 2024 Galician regional election. After failing to obtain any seats for Sumar Galicia, she returned to university lecturing.
