= 2024 Galician regional election =

Election in the Spanish region of Galicia

- 18 February 2024

All 75 seats in the Parliament of Galicia 38 seats needed for a majority
- Opinion polls
- Registered: 2,693,816 ▼0.1%
- Turnout: 1,515,944 (56.3%) ▲7.3 pp
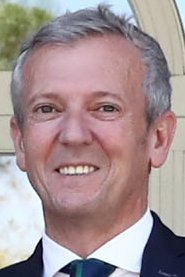

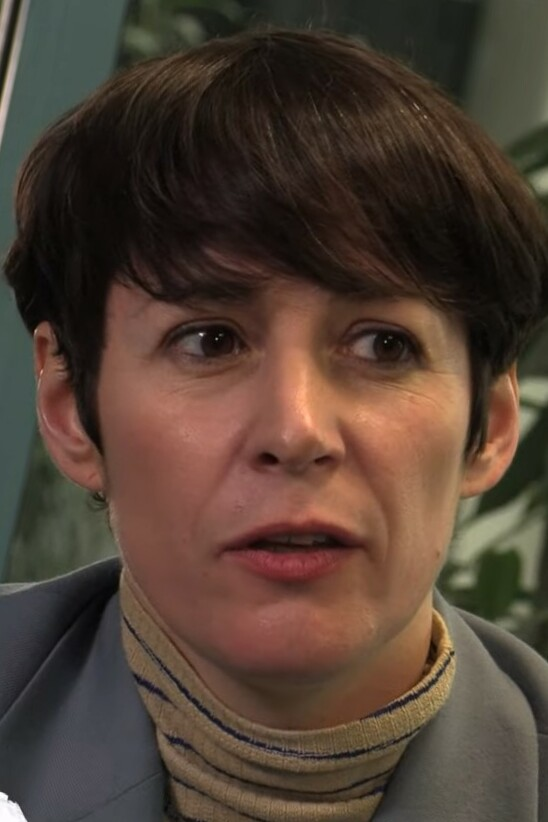

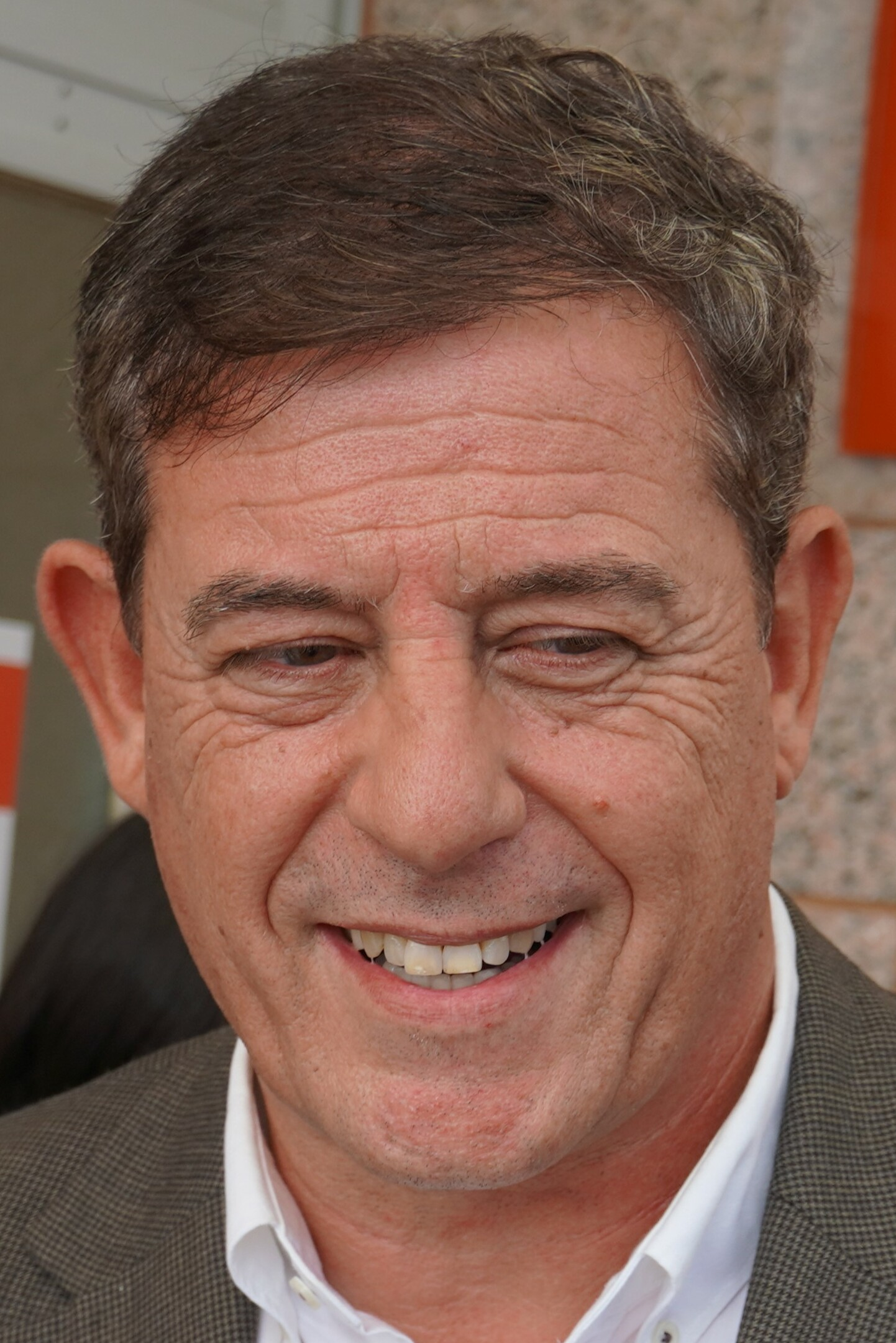

	First party	Second party	Third party
Leader	Alfonso Rueda	Ana Pontón	José Ramón Gómez Besteiro
Party	PP	BNG	PSdeG–PSOE
Leader since	22 May 2022	28 February 2016	18 October 2023
Leader's seat	Pontevedra	A Coruña	Lugo
Last election	42 seats, 48.0%	19 seats, 23.8%	14 seats, 19.4%
Seats won	40	25	9
Seat change	▼2	▲6	▼5
Popular vote	711,713	470,692	211,361
Percentage	47.4%	31.3%	14.1%
Swing	▼0.6 pp	▲7.5 pp	▼5.3 pp
	Fourth party
Leader	Armando Ojea
Party	DO
Leader since	15 November 2023
Leader's seat	Ourense
Last election	Did not contest
Seats won	1
Seat change	▲1
Popular vote	15,442
Percentage	1.0%
Swing	New party
- Constituency results map for the Parliament of Galicia
President before election
Alfonso Rueda
PP
President after election
Alfonso Rueda
PP

A regional election was held in Galicia on 18 February 2024 to elect the 12th Parliament of the autonomous community. All 75 seats in the Parliament were up for election.

== Overview ==
Under the 1981 Statute of Autonomy, the Parliament of Galicia was the unicameral legislature of the homonymous autonomous community, having legislative power in devolved matters, as well as the ability to grant or withdraw confidence from a regional president. The electoral and procedural rules were supplemented by national law provisions.

=== Date ===
The term of the Parliament of Galicia expired four years after the date of its previous election, unless it was dissolved earlier. The election decree was required to be issued no later than 25 days before the scheduled expiration date of parliament and published on the following day in the Official Journal of Galicia (DOG), with election day taking place 54 days after the decree's publication. The previous election was held on 12 July 2020, which meant that the chamber's term would have expired on 12 July 2024. The election decree was required to be published in the DOG no later than 18 June 2024, setting the latest possible date for election day on 11 August 2024.

The regional president had the prerogative to dissolve the Parliament of Galicia at any given time and call a snap election, provided that it did not occur before one year after a previous one under this procedure. In the event of an investiture process failing to elect a regional president within a two-month period from the first ballot, the Parliament was to be automatically dissolved and a fresh election called.

Following Alberto Núñez Feijóo's resignation as president of Galicia to become PP national leader, it was speculated that his successor, Alfonso Rueda, could seek to call a snap election for some time throughout 2023 or even to make it coincide with the scheduled general election in December 2023. Following Pedro Sánchez's surprise announcement of a snap general election on 29 May 2023, Rueda ruled out a simultaneous regional election "because Galicia cannot be infected by instability". It was later commented that a good result for Feijóo in the general election could prompt Rueda to trigger a snap election for late 2023, but the close result on 23 July prevented this from materializing. Following Sánchez's investiture in November 2023, rumours again emerged that Rueda was planning to hold a snap election for early 2024. Asked on 27 November on whether the Galician election would be held simultaneously with the Basque regional election as had been the case in the four previous occasions, Rueda proclaimed that "Galicia has its own way"; later, the president of the Basque Nationalist Party (PNV) Andoni Ortuzar said in an interview that the Galician election seemed "like it is going to go at full speed", with the Galician government allegedly not wishing a simultaneous election call. On 30 November, Rueda acknowledged that he would seek a Galician-only election "without a doubt (...) if that is in the interest of Galicia", and that election preparations were already underway. 18 February has been commented by the media as the most likely date for a snap election to be held. Finally on 21 December, Rueda announced a snap election to be held on 18 February 2024. While Basque lehendakari Iñigo Urkullu was informed of this decision, he distanced himself from Rueda arguing that "the Basque Country is not Galicia", thus paving the way for both elections to be held separately for the first time since 2005.

The Parliament of Galicia was officially dissolved on 26 December 2023 with the publication of the corresponding decree in the DOG, setting election day for 18 February 2024 and scheduling for the chamber to reconvene on 18 March.

=== Electoral system ===
Voting for the Parliament was based on universal suffrage, comprising all Spanish nationals over 18 years of age, registered in Galicia and with full political rights, provided that they had not been deprived of the right to vote by a final sentence. Amendments in 2022 abolished the "begged" voting system (Spanish: Voto rogado), under which non-resident citizens were required to apply for voting. The begged vote system was attributed responsibility for a major decrease in the turnout of Spaniards abroad during the years it was in force.

The Parliament of Galicia had a minimum of 60 and a maximum of 80 seats, with electoral provisions fixing its size at 75. All were elected in four multi-member constituencies—corresponding to the provinces of A Coruña, Lugo, Ourense and Pontevedra, each of which was assigned an initial minimum of 10 seats and the remaining 35 distributed in proportion to population—using the D'Hondt method and closed-list proportional voting, with a five percent-threshold of valid votes (including blank ballots) in each constituency. The use of this electoral method resulted in a higher effective threshold depending on district magnitude and vote distribution.

As a result of the aforementioned allocation, each Parliament constituency was entitled the following seats:

Seats	Constituencies
25	A Coruña
22	Pontevedra
14	Lugo, Ourense

The law did not provide for by-elections to fill vacant seats; instead, any vacancies arising after the proclamation of candidates and during the legislative term were filled by the next candidates on the party lists or, when required, by designated substitutes.

=== Outgoing parliament ===
The table below shows the composition of the parliamentary groups in the chamber at the time of dissolution.

Parliamentary composition in December 2023
Groups	Parties	Legislators	
Groups	Parties	Seats	Total
People's Parliamentary Group of Galicia	PP	42	42
Galician Nationalist Bloc's Parliamentary Group	BNG	19	19
Socialists of Galicia's Parliamentary Group	PSdeG–PSOE	14	14

== Parties and candidates ==
The electoral law allowed for parties and federations registered in the interior ministry, alliances and groupings of electors to present lists of candidates. Parties and federations intending to form an alliance were required to inform the relevant electoral commission within 10 days of the election call, whereas groupings of electors needed to secure the signature of at least one percent of the electorate in the constituencies for which they sought election, disallowing electors from signing for more than one list. Additionally, a balanced composition of men and women was required in the electoral lists, so that candidates of either sex made up at least 40 percent of the total composition.

Below is a list of the main parties and alliances which contested the election:

Candidacy	Parties and alliances	Leading candidate	Ideology	Previous result		Gov.	Ref.
Candidacy	Parties and alliances	Leading candidate	Ideology	Vote %	Seats	Gov.	Ref.
PP	List: People's Party (PP)	Alfonso Rueda	Conservatism; Christian democracy	48.0%	42	Yes	
BNG	List: Galician Nationalist Bloc (BNG) – Galician People's Union (UPG) – Galician Movement for Socialism (MGS) – Abrente–Galician Democratic Left (Abrente–EDG) – Galician Workers' Front (FOGA); Renewal–Nationalist Brotherhood (Anova) – Irmandiño Meeting (EI) – Galician People's Front (FPG) – Movement for the Grassroots (MpB)	Ana Pontón	Galician nationalism Left-wing nationalism Socialism	23.8%	19	No	
PSdeG– PSOE	List: Socialists' Party of Galicia (PSdeG–PSOE)	José Ramón Gómez Besteiro	Social democracy	19.4%	14	No	
Sumar; Galicia	List: Unite Galicia Movement (MSG); United Left (EU) – Communist Party of Galicia (PCG) – The Dawn Marxist Organization (La Aurora (OM)) – Republican Left (IR); Greens Equo (VQ)	Marta Lois	Progressivism; Green politics Democratic socialism	4.0% (Note: Results for GeC–AM (3.9%, 0 seats) and Equo Galicia (0.1%, 0 seats) in the 2020 election.)	0	No	
Podemos–AV	List: We Can (Podemos); Green Alliance (AV); Zero Cuts (Recortes Cero)	Isabel Faraldo	Left-wing populism Democratic socialism	4.0%	0	No	
Vox	List: Vox (Vox)	Álvaro Díaz-Mella	Right-wing populism Ultranationalism; National conservatism	2.0%	0	No	
DO	List: Ourensan Democracy (DO)	Armando Ojea	Localism; Right-wing populism	Did not contest		No	

== Campaign ==
=== Timetable ===
The key dates are listed below (all times are CET):

- 25 December: The election decree is issued with the countersign of the president, after deliberation in the Council of Government.
- 26 December: Formal dissolution of parliament and start of prohibition period on the inauguration of public works, services or projects.
- 29 December: Initial constitution of provincial and zone electoral commissions with judicial members.
- 1 January: Division of constituencies into polling sections and stations.
- 5 January: Deadline for parties and federations to report on their electoral alliances.
- 8 January: Deadline for electoral register consultation for the purpose of possible corrections.
- 15 January: Deadline for parties, federations, alliances, and groupings of electors to present electoral lists.
- 17 January: Publication of submitted electoral lists in the Official Journal of Galicia (DOG).
- 22 January: Official proclamation of validly submitted electoral lists.
- 23 January: Publication of proclaimed electoral lists in the DOG.
- 24 January: Deadline for the selection of polling station members by sortition.
- 1 February: Deadline for the appointment of non-judicial members to provincial and zone electoral commissions.
- 2 February: Official start of electoral campaigning.
- 8 February: Deadline to apply for postal voting.
- 13 February: Start of legal ban on electoral opinion polling publication; deadline for non-resident citizens (electors residing abroad (CERA) and citizens temporarily absent from Spain) to vote by mail.
- 14 February: Deadline for postal and temporarily absent voting.
- 15 February: Deadline for CERA voting.
- 16 February: Last day of electoral campaigning.
- 17 February: Official election silence ("reflection day").
- 18 February: Election day (polling stations open at 9 am and close at 8 pm or once voters present in a queue at/outside the polling station at 8 pm have cast their vote); provisional vote counting.
- 23 February: General counting of votes, including the counting of CERA votes.
- 26 February: Deadline for the general vote counting.
- 6 March: Deadline for the proclamation of elected members.
- 18 March: Deadline for the reconvening of parliament (date determined by the election decree, which for the 2024 election was set for 18 March).
- 15 April: Deadline for the publication of definitive election results in the DOG.

=== Party slogans ===
Party or alliance	Original slogan	English translation	Ref.
PP	« A Galicia que funciona »	"The Galicia that works"	
BNG	« Agora! A Galiza que queres »	"Now! The Galicia you want"	
PSdeG–PSOE	« Desta vai! »	"This one goes!"	
Sumar	« Farémolo posible »	"We will make it possible"	
Podemos	« Defende as túas ideas »	"Defend your ideas"	
Vox	« A mellor » « A mejor »	"To better"	

=== Debates ===
2024 Galician regional election debates
Date	Organizer(s)	Moderator(s)	P Present (Note: Denotes a main invitee attending the event.) S Surrogate (Note: Denotes a main invitee not attending the event, sending a surrogate in their place.) A Absent invitee						
Date	Organizer(s)	Moderator(s)	PP	BNG	PSdeG	Sumar	Podemos	Audience	Ref.
2 February	El País; Cadena SER	Ricardo Rodríguez	S Pazos	P Pontón	P Besteiro	NI	NI	—	
5 February	TVG	Marta Darriba; Alejandro López	P Rueda	P Pontón	P Besteiro	P Lois	P Faraldo	18.0%(150,000)	
14 February	RTVE	Xabier Fortes	A	P Pontón	P Besteiro	NI	NI	17.4%(146,000) (Note: In Galicia, the debate was broadcast on La 1 (113,000; 13.5%) and 24 Horas (33,000; 3.9%). Nationwide, the debate was broadcast on 24 Horas (111,000; 0.9%).)	

== Opinion polls ==
The tables below list opinion polling results in reverse chronological order, showing the most recent first and using the dates when the survey fieldwork was done, as opposed to the date of publication. Where the fieldwork dates are unknown, the date of publication is given instead. The highest percentage figure in each polling survey is displayed with its background shaded in the leading party's colour. If a tie ensues, this is applied to the figures with the highest percentages. The "Lead" column on the right shows the percentage-point difference between the parties with the highest percentages in a poll.

=== Voting intention estimates ===
The table below lists weighted voting intention estimates. Refusals are generally excluded from the party vote percentages, while question wording and the treatment of "don't know" responses and those not intending to vote may vary between polling organisations. When available, seat projections determined by the polling organisations are displayed below (or in place of) the percentages in a smaller font; 38 seats were required for an absolute majority in the Parliament of Galicia.

Color key:

Poll conducted after legal ban on opinion polls

Polling firm/Commissioner	Fieldwork date	Sample size	Turnout	PP	BNG	PSdeG–PSOE	Podemos	Vox	CS	Sumar	DO	Lead
2024 regional election	18 Feb 2024	—N/a	56.3	47.4; 40	31.3; 25	14.1; 9	0.3; 0	2.3; 0	–	1.9; 0	1.0; 1	15.8
Sondaxe/La Voz de Galicia	14–17 Feb 2024	1,200	?	44.6; 39	32.1; 25	14.9; 11	–	2.5; 0	–	2.3; 0	0.7; 0	12.5
Sigma Dos/El Mundo	5–17 Feb 2024	2,389	?	47.8; 38/40	30.8; 24/25	14.8; 10/12	–	1.9; 0	–	2.2; 0	0.6; 0/1	17.0
GAD3/RTVE	1–17 Feb 2024	3,320	?	45.9; 39/40	33.0; 25/26	12.5; 9/10	–	3.1; 0	–	2.5; 0	0.7; 0/1	12.9
PSdeG	15 Feb 2024	?	?	? 37/39	? 25/26	? 11/13	0.5; 0	2.5; 0	–	3.0; 0	? 0	?
KeyData/Público	12 Feb 2024	?	58.7	46.0; 38/39	29.1; 23	16.0; 11/13	0.8; 0	2.5; 0	–	3.5; 0/2	0.7; 0/1	16.9
EM-Analytics/Electomanía	12 Feb 2024	1,400	?	44.7; 38	31.4; 23	15.6; 13	0.8; 0	2.7; 0	–	3.1; 0	0.9; 1	13.3
EM-Analytics/Nós Diario	11–12 Feb 2024	1,400	?	45.3; 38	30.5; 23	16.8; 13	0.7; 0	2.3; 0	–	3.1; 0	0.7; 1	14.8
Demoscopia y Servicios/ESdiario	11–12 Feb 2024	1,000	?	46.3; 38	30.4; 25	14.7; 11	0.9; 0	2.1; 0	–	3.8; 0	0.8; 1	15.9
Sondaxe/La Voz de Galicia	8–11 Feb 2024	1,200	64.1	45.5; 39	29.5; 24	16.8; 12	–	? 0	–	? 0	? 0	16.0
EM-Analytics/Nós Diario	9–10 Feb 2024	1,400	?	45.7; 38	29.7; 23	17.0; 13	0.7; 0	2.2; 0	–	3.3; 0	0.8; 1	16.0
Data10/OKDiario	9–10 Feb 2024	1,500	?	46.5; 39	30.2; 22	14.9; 12	–	1.5; 0	–	4.2; 1	0.8; 1	16.3
Sondaxe/La Voz de Galicia	7–10 Feb 2024	1,200	63.0	45.6; 39	28.4; 23	17.1; 12	–	? 0	–	3.9; 1	? 0	17.2
NC Report/La Razón	5–10 Feb 2024	1,000	50.8	48.6; 40/41	26.1; 21/22	16.4; 12/13	0.3; 0	1.5; 0	–	4.2; 0/1	0.7; 0/1	22.5
EM-Analytics/Nós Diario	8–9 Feb 2024	1,400	?	45.7; 38	29.0; 23	17.0; 13	1.0; 0	2.2; 0	–	3.7; 0	0.8; 1	16.7
Target Point/El Debate	7–9 Feb 2024	1,002	?	46.6; 38/41	27.8; 22/24	16.0; 11/13	0.9; 0	2.3; 0	–	3.4; 0/1	0.9; 0/1	18.6
Sondaxe/La Voz de Galicia	6–9 Feb 2024	1,200	62.6	46.0; 39	28.5; 23	16.8; 13	–	1.9; 0	–	3.4; 0	0.5; 0	17.5
SocioMétrica/El Español	5–9 Feb 2024	?	?	44.6; 37/39	31.1; 24/25	15.0; 11/12	0.7; 0	4.1; 0	–	3.2; 0	0.7; 0/1	13.5
Sigma Dos/El Mundo	26 Jan–9 Feb 2024	1,480	?	47.8; 39/41	28.0; 21/23	17.1; 12/13	0.6; 0	1.8; 0	–	3.4; 0	–	19.8
EM-Analytics/Nós Diario	7–8 Feb 2024	1,400	?	45.4; 39	29.3; 23	17.3; 13	1.0; 0	2.2; 0	–	3.6; 0	0.7; 0	16.1
DYM/El Progreso de Lugo	5–8 Feb 2024	1,345	?	46.7; 39/40	31.0; 23/24	15.1; 11/12	–	3.0; 0	–	2.1; 0	0.6; 0/1	15.7
Sondaxe/La Voz de Galicia	5–8 Feb 2024	1,200	?	45.8; 39	29.1; 24	16.3; 12	–	1.8; 0	–	3.5; 0	0.5; 0	16.7
Infortécnica/Atlántico	1–8 Feb 2024	1,103	?	? 39/42	? 21/23	? 11/12	? 0	? 0	–	? 0/2	? 0/1	?
DemosGal/La Capital	1–8 Feb 2024	1,269	?	47.1; 39/41	23.7; 19/20	17.3; 12/14	1.0; 0	3.6; 0	–	4.6; 0/2	0.7; 0	23.4
EM-Analytics/Nós Diario	6–7 Feb 2024	1,400	?	45.0; 38	28.8; 22	17.6; 14	1.1; 0	2.2; 0	–	3.8; 0	0.8; 1	16.2
CIS	5–7 Feb 2024	3,945	?	42.2; 34/38	33.4; 24/31	18.1; 9/14	0.2; 0	2.4; 0/1	–	2.8; 0/2	0.5; 0/1	8.8
Sondaxe/La Voz de Galicia	4–7 Feb 2024	1,200	?	45.8; 39	28.6; 23	16.7; 13	–	1.9; 0	–	3.7; 0	0.7; 0	17.2
40dB/Prisa	2–7 Feb 2024	1,200	?	45.2; 36/40	30.0; 22/25	15.6; 10/13	0.6; 0	2.5; 0	–	3.3; 0	0.9; 1	15.2
GESOP/Prensa Ibérica	1–7 Feb 2024	1,503	?	44.5; 38	31.0; 25	15.5; 12	–	3.5; 0	–	2.5; 0	0.7; 0	13.5
EM-Analytics/Nós Diario	5–6 Feb 2024	1,400	?	44.8; 37	28.6; 23	17.2; 13	1.0; 0	2.4; 0	–	4.0; 1	0.7; 1	16.2
Sondaxe/La Voz de Galicia	3–6 Feb 2024	1,200	?	46.2; 40	28.3; 22	16.2; 13	–	1.9; 0	–	3.6; 0	0.6; 0	17.9
Celeste-Tel/Onda Cero	1–6 Feb 2024	1,100	50.5	48.0; 40	26.1; 21	16.7; 13	0.3; 0	2.3; 0	–	3.9; 0	0.8; 1	21.9
Sondaxe/La Voz de Galicia	2–5 Feb 2024	1,200	62.0	46.0; 39	27.6; 22	17.3; 14	–	1.9; 0	–	3.7; 0	0.7; 0	18.4
EM-Analytics/Nós Diario	3–4 Feb 2024	1,400	?	45.8; 39	28.2; 22	17.4; 13	0.9; 0	2.8; 0	–	3.9; 0	0.8; 1	17.6
Sondaxe/La Voz de Galicia	1–4 Feb 2024	1,200	?	45.5; 40	26.9; 20	18.0; 15	–	1.7; 0	–	4.1; 0	0.6; 0	18.6
Sondaxe/La Voz de Galicia	31 Jan–3 Feb 2024	1,200	?	44.9; 39	27.6; 21	17.4; 14	–	1.9; 0	–	4.3; 0	0.9; 1	17.3
Sondaxe/La Voz de Galicia	30 Jan–2 Feb 2024	1,200	57.2	44.8; 39	27.0; 20	17.4; 14	–	1.8; 0	–	4.6; 1	0.8; 1	17.8
EM-Analytics/Nós Diario	31 Jan–1 Feb 2024	1,400	?	45.8; 39	27.6; 23	18.5; 13	0.8; 0	1.8; 0	–	3.4; 0	0.7; 0	18.2
GAD3/Mediaset	29 Jan–1 Feb 2024	800	?	47.6; 39	29.1; 23	16.5; 13	0.5; 0	1.9; 0	–	2.1; 0	0.5; 0	18.5
CIS	29 Jan–1 Feb 2024	3,743	?	42.2; 34/38	32.9; 22/26	20.1; 13/15	0.3; 0	0.9; 0	–	2.1; 0/1	0.4; 0/1	9.3
Sondaxe/La Voz de Galicia	29 Jan–1 Feb 2024	1,200	57.0	44.5; 39	26.4; 20	17.6; 14	–	2.5; 0	–	5.0; 1	0.8; 1	17.6
NC Report/La Razón	27 Jan–1 Feb 2024	1,000	49.6	47.9; 40/41	25.3; 19/20	17.2; 14/15	–	1.5; 0	–	4.3; 0/1	0.5; 0	22.6
Sigma Dos/El Mundo	26 Jan–1 Feb 2024	1,950	?	48.1; 39/42	24.5; 18/20	18.5; 14/15	0.6; 0	2.2; 0	–	4.9; 1	0.5; 0	23.6
DemosGal/La Capital	25 Jan–1 Feb 2024	1,567	?	44.6; 39	22.4; 19	17.9; 15	1.9; 0	4.2; 0	–	4.3; 2	0.7; 0	22.2
Infortécnica/Atlántico	24 Jan–1 Feb 2024	1,075	?	? 39/41	? 19/21	? 13/14	? 0	? 0	–	? 0/1	? 0/1	?
Sondaxe/La Voz de Galicia	28–31 Jan 2024	1,200	58.8	44.1; 39	26.9; 20	17.5; 14	–	2.9; 0	–	4.9; 1	0.7; 1	17.2
Infortécnica/Atlántico	23–27 Jan 2024	?	?	? 41/42	? 17/18	? 15/16	? 0	? 0	–	? 0/1	? 0	?
Celeste-Tel/Onda Cero	26 Jan 2024	?	50.3	47.7; 40	24.5; 20	18.0; 14	? 0	? 0	–	? 1	? 0	23.2
GAD3/ABC	23–26 Jan 2024	800	?	47.3; 39/40	29.6; 23	16.5; 12/13	–	1.8; 0	–	2.6; 0	0.5; 0	17.7
Infortécnica/El Progreso	22–26 Jan 2024	?	?	? 40/42	? 16/19	? 14/17	? 0	? 0	–	? 0/1	? 0/1	?
Sigma Dos/Antena 3	15–26 Jan 2024	1,799	?	46.6; 38/41	? 17/18	20.1; 15/16	–	–	–	5.2; 2	–	?
DemosGal/La Capital	18–24 Jan 2024	1,259	?	? 40	? 18	? 15	? 0	? 0	–	? 2	? 0	?
EM-Analytics/Nós Diario	19–23 Jan 2024	1,400	?	45.4; 39	26.8; 23	18.8; 13	1.3; 0	3.0; 0	–	3.5; 0	0.7; 0	18.6
CIS	8–20 Jan 2024	11,011	?	43.2; 36/38	29.3; 20/23	20.4; 15/17	0.4; 0	1.3; 0	–	3.5; 0/2	0.4; 1	13.9
Hamalgama Métrica/Vozpópuli	12–18 Jan 2024	1,000	?	46.5; 39	23.3; 19	18.3; 15	1.5; 0	3.9; 1	–	4.3; 1	–	23.2
EM-Analytics/Nós Diario	1–18 Jan 2024	1,400	?	46.0; 39	26.3; 22	18.3; 13	1.3; 0	2.7; 0	–	3.3; 0	0.7; 1	19.7
Target Point/El Debate	11–16 Jan 2024	1,000	?	46.9; 39/41	25.0; 19/21	17.4; 12/14	0.6; 0	2.3; 0	–	4.0; 0/2	0.8; 0/1	21.9
Sigma Dos/El Mundo	2–12 Jan 2024	1,140	?	47.4; 38/41	23.4; 18/19	20.6; 15/17	1.0; 0	2.1; 0	–	4.9; 1/2	–	24.0
40dB/Prisa	2–4 Jan 2024	1,200	?	47.5; 39/42	24.8; 19/21	17.9; 14/15	1.1; 0	2.7; 0	–	3.4; 0	0.5; 0	22.7
Sondaxe/La Voz de Galicia	29 Dec–4 Jan 2024	1,226	55	43.9; 39	26.5; 20	18.7; 15	0.8; 0	3.0; 0	–	4.8; 1	0.4; 0	17.4
EM-Analytics/El Plural	20 Dec–4 Jan 2024	1,550	?	45.8; 39	26.3; 22	18.1; 13	1.1; 0	4.0; 0	–	3.3; 0	0.8; 1	19.5
SocioMétrica/El Español	25–31 Dec 2023	2,309	?	44.6; 39	25.5; 22	17.5; 14	2.1; 0	3.8; 0	–	4.4; 0	–	19.1
Sondaxe/La Voz de Galicia	18–26 Oct 2023	1,223	?	46.1; 40	25.3; 19	19.4; 15	(Note: Within Sumar.)	–	–	5.1; 1	–	20.8
EM-Analytics/Electomanía	24 Jul–25 Aug 2023	1,410	?	44.2; 39	26.4; 22	17.0; 14	4.0; 0	4.7; 0	–	–	–	17.8
2023 general election	23 Jul 2023	—N/a	61.4	43.6 (38)	9.4 (6)	29.8 (24)		4.9 (1)	–	10.9 (6)	–	13.8
Sondaxe/La Voz de Galicia	13–21 Jun 2023	1,223	?	46.6; 41	26.8; 21	16.7; 13	3.7; 0	2.5; 0	–	–	–	19.8
Sondaxe/La Voz de Galicia	6–19 Oct 2022	1,223	?	45.7; 40	25.9; 20	15.7; 13	5.6; 2	2.7; 0	1.0; 0	–	–	19.8
EM-Analytics/Electomanía	30 Jun–13 Aug 2022	548	?	42.3; 37	26.2; 22	19.4; 14	5.0; 2	4.8; 0	0.9; 0	–	–	16.1
Sondaxe/La Voz de Galicia	16–24 May 2022	1,000	?	45.2; 39	24.8; 19	18.3; 15	5.4; 2	–	–	–	–	20.4
EM-Analytics/Electomanía	15 Feb–30 Mar 2022	360	?	42.0; 37	26.0; 20	19.6; 15	5.0; 1	5.0; 1	0.9; 0	–	–	16.0
Sondaxe/La Voz de Galicia	10–22 Feb 2022	1,223	?	44.6; 39	24.5; 20	17.7; 14	5.6; 2	–	–	–	–	20.1
Sondaxe/La Voz de Galicia	14–21 Oct 2021	1,223	?	45.5; 39	25.9; 20	17.0; 14	6.0; 2	–	–	–	–	19.6
Sondaxe/La Voz de Galicia	16–23 Jun 2021	1,223	50	45.8; 40	24.4; 18	18.0; 14	6.1; 3	–	–	–	–	21.4
Sondaxe/La Voz de Galicia	21 Jan–2 Feb 2021	?	?	46.2; 39	25.6; 21	16.2; 14	5.1; 1	–	–	–	–	20.6
ElectoPanel/Electomanía	31 Dec 2020	?	?	47.0; 39	26.7; 22	18.3; 14	2.5; 0	2.7; 0	0.7; 0	–	–	20.3
Sondaxe/La Voz de Galicia	1–7 Oct 2020	1,223	?	46.9; 40	27.0; 22	17.1; 13	–	–	–	–	–	19.9
2020 regional election	12 Jul 2020	—N/a	49.0	48.0; 42	23.8; 19	19.4; 14	3.9; 0	2.0; 0	0.8; 0	–	–	24.2

=== Voting preferences ===
The table below lists raw, unweighted voting preferences.

Polling firm/Commissioner	Fieldwork date	Sample size	PP	BNG	PSdeG–PSOE	Podemos	Vox	CS	Sumar	DO	Question	X mark	Lead
2024 regional election (Note: Does not include non-resident citizens.)	18 Feb 2024	—N/a	31.6	21.1	9.4	0.2	1.5	–	1.3	0.7	—N/a	32.7	10.5
DYM/El Progreso de Lugo	5–8 Feb 2024	1,345	30.8	25.3	11.9	–	3.8	–	3.1	1.0	14.5	5.7	5.5
CIS	5–7 Feb 2024	3,945	32.5	27.2	12.2	0.2	2.1	–	2.2	0.5	19.0	2.6	5.3
40dB/Prisa	2–7 Feb 2024	1,200	28.9	24.3	12.2	1.0	3.2	–	3.8	1.4	14.6	6.2	4.6
GESOP/Prensa Ibérica	1–7 Feb 2024	1,503	26.8	21.9	11.6	–	2.0	–	1.0	0.4	35.6		4.9
CIS	29 Jan–1 Feb 2024	3,743	34.7	25.3	12.8	0.2	1.2	–	2.2	0.3	19.6	2.2	9.4
CIS	8–20 Jan 2024	11,011	35.9	26.5	14.1	0.4	1.3	–	2.8	0.3	15.7	1.7	9.4
40dB/Prisa	2–4 Jan 2024	1,200	30.8	18.7	14.9	1.3	3.2	–	4.3	0.5	16.5	6.8	12.1
2023 general election	23 Jul 2023	—N/a	31.6	6.9	21.6		3.5	–	7.9	–	—N/a	26.9	10.0
2020 regional election	12 Jul 2020	—N/a	28.0	13.9	11.3	2.3	1.2	0.4	–	–	—N/a	41.1	14.1

=== Victory preferences ===
The table below lists opinion polling on the victory preferences for each party in the event of a regional election taking place.

Polling firm/Commissioner	Fieldwork date	Sample size	PP	BNG	PSdeG–PSOE	Podemos	Vox	Sumar	Other/ None	Question	Lead
CIS	5–7 Feb 2024	3,945	35.7	30.2	14.9	–	1.9	2.5	3.9	11.0	5.5
CIS	29 Jan–1 Feb 2024	3,743	38.4	29.8	15.4	–	1.2	2.2	3.4	9.6	8.6
CIS	8–20 Jan 2024	11,011	37.8	29.2	16.2	0.5	1.4	2.9	3.2	8.8	8.6

=== Victory likelihood ===
The table below lists opinion polling on the perceived likelihood of victory for each party in the event of a regional election taking place.

Polling firm/Commissioner	Fieldwork date	Sample size	PP	BNG	PSdeG–PSOE	Other/ None	Question	Lead
CIS	8–20 Jan 2024	11,011	79.6	5.3	4.6	0.7	9.8	74.3
EM-Analytics/Electomanía	31 Dec–12 Jan 2024	2,850	62.5	21.8		–	15.7	40.7

=== Preferred President ===
The table below lists opinion polling on leader preferences to become president of the Regional Government of Galicia.

Polling firm/Commissioner	Fieldwork date	Sample size						Other/ None/ Not care	Question	Lead
Polling firm/Commissioner	Fieldwork date	Sample size	Rueda PP	Pontón BNG	Besteiro PSdeG	Lois Sumar	Díaz-Mella Vox	Other/ None/ Not care	Question	Lead
DYM/El Progreso de Lugo	5–8 Feb 2024	1,345	36.5	32.5	11.6	–	–	–	–	4.0
CIS	5–7 Feb 2024	3,945	35.0	34.6	11.4	1.2	0.9	5.0	10.4	0.4
40dB/Prisa	2–7 Feb 2024	1,200	33.2	30.4	11.1	1.3	1.6	10.7	11.7	2.8
GAD3/Mediaset	29 Jan–1 Feb 2024	800	41.6	26.4	10.7	0.7	–	–	–	15.2
CIS	29 Jan–1 Feb 2024	3,743	37.8	31.9	10.7	1.4	0.6	6.0	11.7	5.9
GAD3/ABC	23–26 Jan 2024	800	45.0	24.7	9.1	1.0	–	12.7	7.5	20.3
Sigma Dos/Antena 3	15–26 Jan 2024	1,799	38.9	22.9	11.6	–	–	12.4	–	16.0
CIS	8–20 Jan 2024	11,011	38.1	28.5	13.0	2.1	0.5	7.2	10.5	9.6
SocioMétrica/El Español	25–31 Dec 2023	2,309	30.0	25.0	14.9	4.9	–	25.4		5.0

=== Predicted President ===
The table below lists opinion polling on the perceived likelihood for each leader to become president of the Regional Government of Galicia.

Polling firm/Commissioner	Fieldwork date	Sample size				Other/ None/ Not care	Question	Lead
Polling firm/Commissioner	Fieldwork date	Sample size	Rueda PP	Pontón BNG	Besteiro PSdeG	Other/ None/ Not care	Question	Lead
DemosGal/La Capital	1–8 Feb 2024	1,269	45.9	11.4	4.1	–	38.6	34.5
DemosGal/La Capital	18–24 Jan 2024	1,259	41.9	11.4	2.8	–	43.9	30.5

== Voter turnout ==
The table below shows registered voter turnout during the election. Figures for election day do not include non-resident citizens, while final figures do.

Province	Time (Election day)									Final		
Province	12:00			17:00			20:00			Final		
Province	2020	2024	+/–	2020	2024	+/–	2020	2024	+/–	2020	2024	+/–
A Coruña	18.79%	16.73%	−2.06	42.84%	48.57%	+5.73	57.97%	66.17%	+8.20	49.63%	56.90%	+7.27
Lugo	18.20%	17.76%	−0.44	41.89%	49.75%	+7.86	59.97%	69.83%	+9.86	48.27%	56.24%	+7.97
Ourense	21.70%	19.28%	−2.42	42.69%	50.19%	+7.50	60.79%	68.96%	+8.17	43.92%	50.12%	+6.20
Pontevedra	19.85%	16.66%	−3.19	43.60%	49.34%	+5.74	58.95%	67.24%	+8.29	50.44%	57.94%	+7.50
Total	19.42%	17.12%	–2.30	42.97%	49.17%	+6.20	58.88%	67.30%	+8.42	48.97%	56.27%	+7.30

== Results ==
=== Overall ===
← Summary of the 18 February 2024 Parliament of Galicia election results
Parties and alliances	Popular vote			Seats	
Parties and alliances	Votes	%	±pp	Total	+/−
People's Party (PP)	711,713	47.39	−0.57	40	−2
Galician Nationalist Bloc (BNG)	470,692	31.34	+7.55	25	+6
Socialists' Party of Galicia (PSdeG–PSOE)	211,361	14.07	−5.32	9	−5
Vox (Vox)	34,045	2.27	+0.22	0	±0
Unite Galicia (Sumar Galicia)^{1}	29,009	1.93	n/a	0	±0
Ourensan Democracy (DO)	15,442	1.03	New	1	+1
Animalist Party with the Environment (PACMA)^{2}	5,932	0.40	−0.06	0	±0
We Can Galicia (Podemos–AV)^{1}	4,420	0.29	n/a	0	±0
Blank Seats (EB)	2,884	0.19	+0.15	0	±0
Galicianist Common Space (ECG)	1,635	0.11	New	0	±0
For a Fairer World (PUM+J)	1,572	0.10	+0.04	0	±0
Blank ballots	13,052	0.87	−0.03		
Total	1,501,757			75	±0
Valid votes	1,501,757	99.06	−0.03		
Invalid votes	14,187	0.94	+0.03		
Votes cast / turnout	1,515,944	56.27	+7.30		
Abstentions	1,177,872	43.73	−7.30		
Registered voters	2,693,816				
Sources
Footnotes: ^{1} Within the Galicia in Common–Renewal–Tides alliance in the 2020 election.; ^{2} Animalist Party with the Environment results are compared to Animalist Party Against Mistreatment of Animals totals in the 2020 election.

Popular vote
PP	47.39%
BNG	31.34%
PSdeG–PSOE	14.07%
Vox	2.27%
Sumar	1.93%
DO	1.03%
Others	1.09%
Blank ballots	0.87%

Seats
PP	53.33%
BNG	33.33%
PSdeG–PSOE	12.00%
DO	1.33%

=== Distribution by constituency ===
Constituency	PP		BNG		PSdeG		DO	
Constituency	%	S	%	S	%	S	%	S
A Coruña	47.7	13	32.5	9	13.0	3		
Lugo	53.3	8	25.0	4	17.3	2		
Ourense	50.1	8	25.0	4	12.4	1	8.7	1
Pontevedra	44.0	11	34.4	8	14.8	3		
Total	47.4	40	31.3	25	14.1	9	1.0	1

== Aftermath ==
=== Government formation ===
Investiture; Nomination of Alfonso Rueda (PP)
Ballot →	11 April 2024
Required majority →	38 out of 75
Yes: • PP (40)	40 / 75
No: • BNG (25); • PSdeG (9)	34 / 75
Abstentions: • DO (1)	1 / 75
Absentees	0 / 75

== Bibliography ==
- Ley Orgánica 1/1981, de 6 de abril, de Estatuto de Autonomía para Galicia (Organic Law 1/1981). Official State Gazette (in Spanish). 6 April 1981 [version as of 28 December 2022]. BOE-A-1981-9564.
- Ley 1/1983, de 22 de febrero, reguladora de la Junta y su Presidente (Law 1/1983). Official State Gazette (in Spanish). 22 February 1983 [version as of 4 September 2015]. BOE-A-1983-23788.
- Ley Orgánica 5/1985, de 19 de junio, del Régimen Electoral General (Organic Law 5/1985). Official State Gazette (in Spanish). 19 June 1985 [version as of 2 February 2024]. BOE-A-1985-11672.
- Ley 8/1985, de 13 de agosto, de elecciones al Parlamento de Galicia (Law 8/1985). Official State Gazette (in Spanish). 13 August 1985 [version as of 31 August 2015]. BOE-A-1985-21380.
- Decreto 150/2023, de 25 de diciembre, de disolución del Parlamento de Galicia y de convocatoria de elecciones (PDF) (Decree 150/2023). Official Journal of Galicia (in Spanish). 25 December 2023.
