= Armando Ojea =

Spanish politician

Armando Ojea Bouzo (born 1962) is a Spanish politician. He was the first representative of Ourensan Democracy (DO) to be elected to the Parliament of Galicia, in the 2024 election.

== Biography ==
Born in Vilar de Barrio, Province of Ourense, Ojea began working in 1985 as a physics and mathematics teacher in private schools. He was also a coordinator of occupational learning, and a professional musician. He has written on the history and toponymy of his native province.

Ojea was elected to the city council of Ourense in 2015 and became deputy to mayor Gonzalo Pérez Jácome in 2019. He was acting mayor from 24 to 27 December 2020. He was also a member of the provincial deputation, but had to resign in order to run for the Parliament of Galicia.

Jácome placed Ojea in first on DO's list for the 2024 Galician regional election. The party was expected to the perform well enough to be the kingmaker, with Jácome responding to questions over who they would pact with by quoting the line "show me the money" from the film Jerry Maguire. In the end, only Ojea was elected.
