= Más País =

More Country Más País
- Founder: Íñigo Errejón
- Founded: 25 September 2019
- Registered: 30 September 2019 (electoral platform); 9 March 2021 (party)
- Dissolved: 10 October 2023
- Split from: Podemos
- Merged into: Movimiento Sumar; Más Madrid
- Headquarters: C/ Castillo de Ucles, 16 28037, Madrid
- Membership: 20,600 (2019)
- Ideology: Green politics; Direct democracy; Anti-globalization; Progressivism; Republicanism; Federalism
- Political position: Left-wing
- National affiliation: Sumar (2023)
- Colors: Emerald

Website
- maspais.es

Más País (MP), or More Country, was a political party in Spain. It was an electoral platform formed by Íñigo Errejón around Más Madrid in order to contest the November 2019 general election.

The party was positioned on the left-wing of the political spectrum, and it promoted anti-globalisation, green politics, progressivism, women's and sexual minority rights and direct democracy.

== History ==
The platform was announced on 22 September 2019 and was formally launched on 25 September, out of a desire of preventing dissatisfaction from centre-left voters over the failure in the government formation process between the Spanish Socialist Workers' Party (PSOE) and Unidas Podemos to translate into a higher abstention rate. During the party's presentation, Errejón announced that it would avoid running in the smaller constituencies, where they would be unlikely to win any seat but could contribute to other left-of-centre parties—mainly PSOE and UP—losing out their own seats due to vote splitting.

On 26 September, it was revealed the platform had reached a tentative agreement with Equo in order to run jointly in a number of constituencies, a choice subsequently ratified by a majority of party members the next day, (Note: 58.7% in favour of joining Más País, 25.9% in favour of remaining in Unidas Podemos and 15.4% in favour of the party contesting the election on its own, with a 33.3% turnout.) in practice meaning the end of the Equo collaboration with Unidas Podemos despite some members, such as Juan López de Uralde, announcing their will to remain within Pablo Iglesias's coalition while leaving the party. On 27 September, the platform was joined by Podemos Region of Murcia leaders Óscar Urralburu and María Giménez, the party's only elected members in the Regional Assembly of Murcia, who subsequently left Podemos and their regional seats amid criticism of its national leader Pablo Iglesias.

On 30 September, just before the deadline for the registration of electoral coalitions, Más País legally took the form of a renaming of Más Madrid, while also modifying the latter's territorial scope from the Madrid region to a country-wide level. The political party registered two-way coalitions before the electoral authorities with Compromís ("Més Compromís"; in the constituencies of Alicante, Castellón and Valencia) and Equo (in Madrid, A Coruña, Pontevedra, Murcia, Asturias, Santa Cruz de Tenerife, Las Palmas, Biscay, Cádiz, Granada, Málaga and Seville) as well as a three-way coalition with Chunta Aragonesista and Equo in Zaragoza.

On 4 October, it was announced that Carolina Bescansa, one of the Podemos co-founders, would be joining the party as their lead candidate for the constituency of A Coruña, a move which prompted further defections from Podemos' branch in Galicia into Más País. Three days later, right before the deadline for the registration of single-party lists, the party collected the minimum number of signatures (amounting to 0.1% of the electoral census) to run as a stand-alone party in the constituencies of Barcelona and the Balearic Islands. They oppose political gridlock.

In 2021, the party introduced a motion to legalise the recreational use of cannabis in Spain.

In 2023, former Podemos deputy Alberto Rodríguez Rodríguez announced that his new party, Drago Project, would be joining the alliance ahead of the 2023 regional elections.

The party started a process to dissolve all of its branches (except Más Madrid, which would remain as an independent party) and integrate in Movimiento Sumar (the political party created by Yolanda Díaz to gather independent figures in her electoral platform) after the 2023 Spanish general election.

== Coalitions ==
Ahead of the November 2019 Spanish general election, the system of electoral alliances and coalitions established by Más País comprised the following parties:

Party	Notes
More Country (Más País)	In Barcelona and Balearic Islands (plus Mallorca for the Senate).
Equo (Equo)	In A Coruña, Asturias, Biscay, Las Palmas, Madrid, Murcia, Pontevedra, Santa Cruz de Tenerife.
Commitment Coalition (Compromís)	Within Més Compromís (in Alicante, Castellón and Valencia).
Aragonese Union (CHA)	In Zaragoza.
Andalusian People's Initiative (IdPA)	In Cádiz, Granada, Málaga and Seville.

== Electoral performance ==
=== Cortes Generales ===
Cortes Generales
Election	Leading candidate	Congress				Senate		Government
Election	Leading candidate	Votes	%	Seats	+/–	Seats	+/–	Government
Nov. 2019	Íñigo Errejón	582,306	2.40 (#7)	3 / 350	3	0 / 208	0	Confidence and supply

=== Regional parliaments ===
Region	Election	Votes	%	Seats	+/–	Government
Andalusia	2022	Within PorA		1 / 109	1	Opposition

== Symbols ==
Main logo

Alternative logo

Logo for Más País–Equo lists

Logo for Más País–CHA–Equo lists
