= José Ramón Gómez Besteiro =

Spanish politician

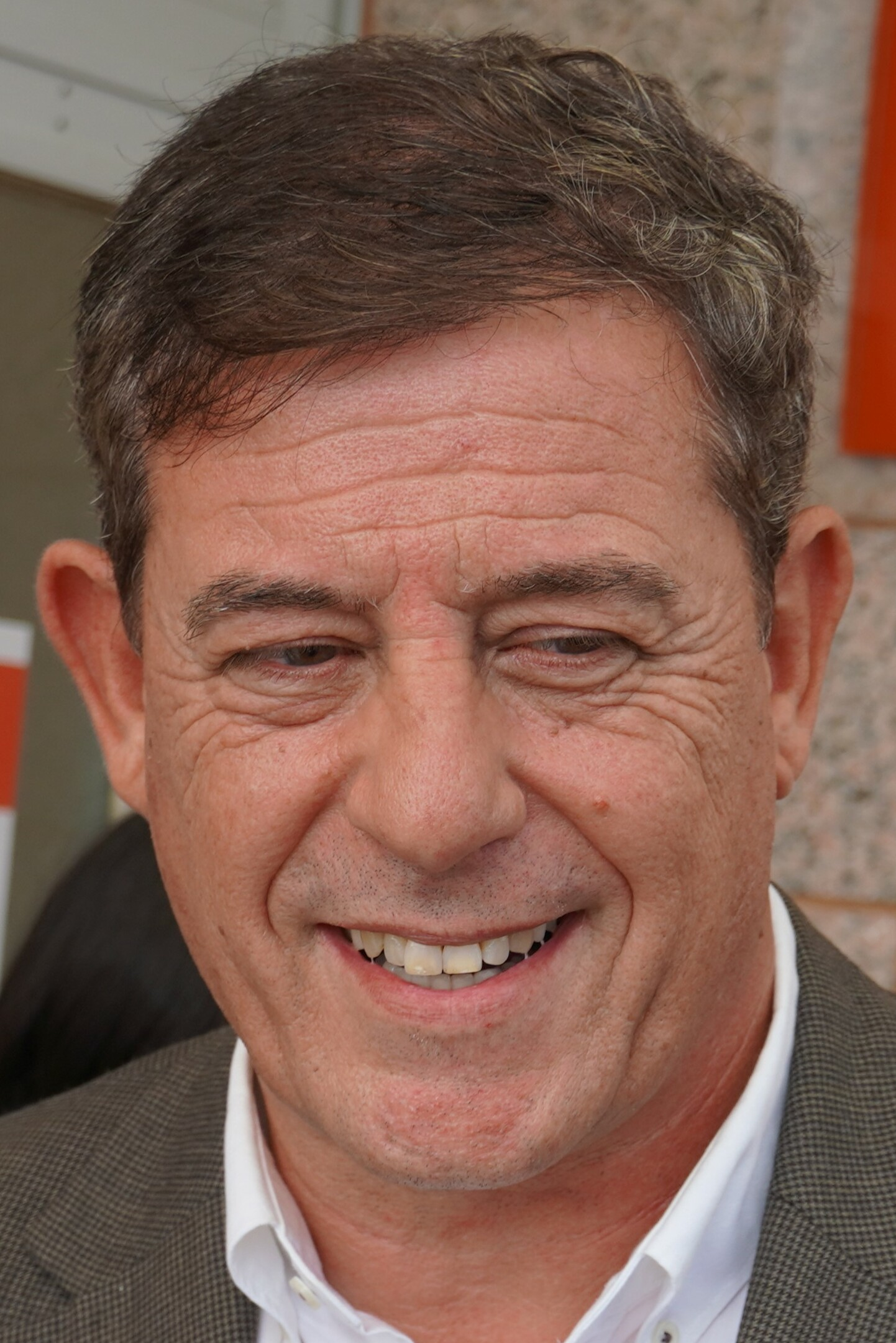

Delegate of the Government in Galicia
- In office 28 March 2023 – 14 June 2023
- Preceded by: José Miñones
- Succeeded by: Pedro Blanco Lobeiras

Member of the Congress of Deputies
- Incumbent
- Assumed office 17 August 2023
- Constituency: Lugo

Member of the Lugo City Council
- In office 4 July 1999 – 13 June 2015

Personal details
- Born: José Ramón Gómez Besteiro; 15 November 1967 (age 58) Lugo, Spain
- Party: Socialists' Party of Galicia
- Children: 2
- Education: University of Santiago de Compostela

José Ramón Gómez Besteiro (born 15 November 1967) is a Spanish politician for the Socialists' Party of Galicia (PSdeG–PSOE). He is the PSdeG–PSOE candidate for the 2024 Galician regional election.

== Biography ==
In December 2025, the president of the provincial deputation in Lugo, José Tomé, resigned from his positions following allegations of sexual misconduct made by several women, though he rejected any wrongdoing and presented himself as "the victim of a set-up". Besteiro admitted to having prior knowledge of the allegations against Tomé, a disclosure that led to the resignation of the party's regional equality lead.
