= Ana Pontón =

Spanish politician

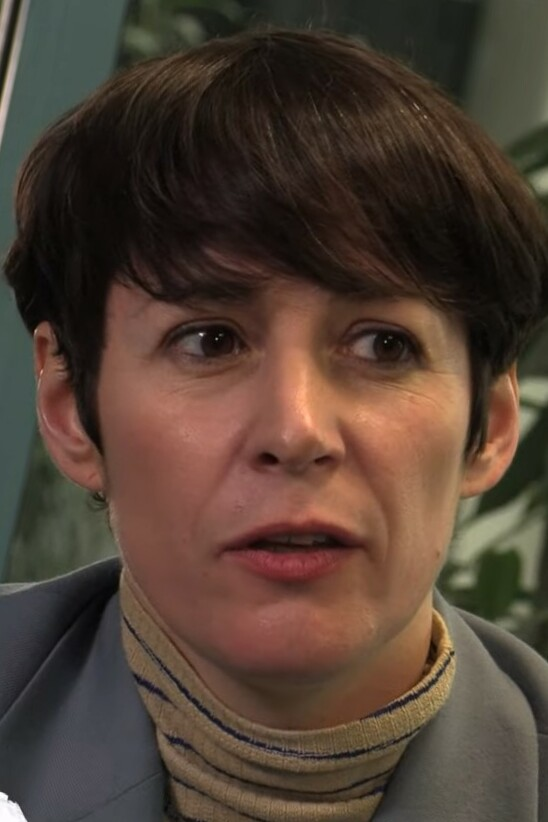
- Ana Pontón in 2022

Spokesperson of the Galician Nationalist Bloc
- Incumbent
- Assumed office 28 February 2016
- Preceded by: Xavier Vence

Member of the Parliament of Galicia
- Incumbent
- Assumed office 7 February 2004
- Constituency: A Coruña

Personal details
- Born: Ana Belén Pontón Mondelo; 27 July 1977 (age 49) Sarria, Spain
- Party: Galician Nationalist Bloc (since 1993)
- Other political affiliations: Galician People's Union
- Children: 1
- Education: University of Santiago de Compostela
- Website: anaponton.gal

Ana Belén Pontón Mondelo (born 27 July 1977) is a Spanish political scientist and politician for the Galician Nationalist Bloc (BNG). She has served in the Parliament of Galicia since 2004, and in 2016 was the first woman to be elected spokesperson of the BNG. She has been leader of the opposition to the region's People's Party government since the 2020 election, and led the BNG to its best-ever result in 2024.

== Biography ==
Pontón was born in the village of Chorrente near Sarria in the Province of Lugo, and grew up in a house that her great-grandfather had built in 1904. She graduated in Political Sciences from the University of Santiago de Compostela.

Pontón was first elected to the Parliament of Galicia in 2004. In February 2016, she received 85% of the votes to be the party's national spokesperson, the first woman in the role.

In the July 2020 Galician elections, the BNG's vote share under Pontón jumped from 8.3% to 23.7%, and its seats from six to a record 19. The result made the party the second largest in Parliament after the People's Party of regional president Alberto Núñez Feijóo, and Pontón became Leader of the Opposition.

The BNG had its best-ever result in the 2024 elections under Pontón's leadership, with 25 deputies and 31.5% of the vote, but did not prevent another PP majority. It was the most voted party in the largest city of Vigo, and had one of the best results of any left-leaning party in the region's history.

== Personal life ==
In January 2020, Pontón gave birth to her first daughter in Santiago de Compostela.
