= Sumar (electoral alliance) =

Unite Sumar
- Spokesperson: Ernest Urtasun
- Spokesperson in Congress: Verónica Martínez Barbero
- Founder: Yolanda Díaz
- Founded: 28 March 2022 (association); 9 June 2023 (electoral alliance)
- Preceded by: Unidas Podemos
- Succeeded by: Broad Front
- Ideology: Progressivism; Green politics Social democracy Democratic socialism
- Political position: Centre-left to left-wing
- European Parliament group: The Left (MS); Greens/EFA (Comuns and Més–Compromís)
- Colours: Pink
- Members: See composition
- Congress of Deputies: 31 / 350
- Senate: 0 / 266
- European Parliament (Spanish seats): 3 / 61

Website
- coalicionsumar.es

Sumar (English: "Unite", "Add up" or "Sum") is an electoral alliance and parliamentary group established ahead of the 2023 Spanish general election, founded by Spanish second deputy prime minister and labour minister Yolanda Díaz, provisionally registered as an association on 28 March 2022 and publicly unveiled on 18 May. After a series of nationwide public events from July 2022 to 25 March 2023, the association launched its manifesto and officially announced Díaz's candidacy for the election on 2 April. On 30 May 2023, the association registered as a political party under the name Movimiento Sumar (English: "Unite Movement"), and then was registered as an electoral alliance joined by other parties (such as United Left, Más Madrid, Coalició Compromís, Catalunya en Comú and, temporarily, Podemos).

== History ==
=== Background ===
As a result of Pablo Iglesias's departure from active politics in May 2021, Labour minister—and, from July 2021, second deputy prime minister—Yolanda Díaz, came to be widely regarded as Iglesias's presumptive successor as prime ministerial candidate in the next general election. Díaz expressed her will to shape a new electoral platform transcending political parties, as well as the Unidas Podemos brand, aiming to secure the support of ideologically close forces such as En Comú Podem (ECP), Compromís and Más Madrid/Más País while giving a prevalent role to civil society.

The platform was drafted during an event held on 13 November 2021, with the participation of a number of female representatives of the various political spaces that could eventually join it: Díaz herself, Barcelona mayor, Ada Colau (BComú), Valencian vice president Mónica Oltra (Compromís), Madrilenian opposition leader Mónica García (Más Madrid) and Ceutan councillor Fatima Hamed (from the Movement for Dignity and Citizenship, MDyC); the absence of Podemos members at the event, most notably of Equality and Social Rights ministers Irene Montero and Ione Belarra, was seen as evidence of the growing diminished role of Unidas Podemos within the platform. The Díaz-led incoming left-wing alliance was also welcomed by incumbent prime minister Pedro Sánchez, who saw it as important for the "progressive space" to be in "top shape" in order for his government to be able to maintain and expand its majority in the next election. While the term "Broad Front" has been frequently used in the media to refer to Díaz's platform, it has been commented that Díaz herself has rejected the use of this name for its connections with similar brandings used by left-wing populist alliances in Latin America.

After its postponement as a result of the international crisis sparked by the 2022 Russian invasion of Ukraine, it was announced on 18 May 2022 that Díaz's platform would go under the provisional name "Sumar" (English: Unite), with its formal launch being scheduled for after the 2022 Andalusian regional election. Díaz herself has asserted that, while she feels comfortable with the "Sumar" concept, it may not be her platform's definitive name, depending on administrative and bureaucratic processes. On 24 May, the platform's name and logo were registered at the Spanish Patent and Trademark Office.

=== Official launch, rallies, policy teams ===
On 1 July 2022, the social media accounts of both Yolanda Díaz and Sumar published promotional videos for the platform's launch event, as part of a broader 'consultation process' (proceso de escucha) starting on 8 July 2022 in the Matadero Madrid arts centre. The Sumar brand and logo were officially introduced in that event as well. The event had an audience of over 5,000 people, with the attendance of relevant figures in the Spanish cultural landscape such as James Rhodes, Elvira Sastre or Belén Gopegui.

At the same time, a series of work teams were assembled in order to prepare the platform's policy positions in the form of a long-term national strategy. These were introduced on 23 September 2022, including experts and public figures such as César Rendueles, Ignacio Sánchez-Cuenca or Yayo Herrero.

After the first rally, similar events followed in Lugo, Bilbao, Gijón, Sabadell and Mérida, and in November 2022, the platform was introduced to audiences in Pamplona, Logroño and Valencia. The nationwide encounters of Díaz with the public continued in A Coruña, Zaragoza, Tarragona, Barcelona, Palma de Mallorca, Valladolid, Albacete and Murcia. The last rallies took place in March 2023 in Santander, Seville and Las Palmas. The final event of the consultation process, which also served as Díaz's official presentation of her bid for the 2023 elections, took place in Madrid on 2 April. Among the main parties present in the event were United Left (IU), Más Madrid, Compromís and Catalunya en Comú, but the absence of Podemos was noted due to divergences with Díaz over the process to elect the platform's candidates.

At the start of June 2023, former MP Pablo Bustinduy, identified with Podemos, and MEP Ernest Urtasun, identified with En Comú Podem, were announced as part of the Sumar campaign.

=== Agreements ===
Following the early election call for 23 July 2023, the various allied parties of Sumar announced their agreements for joining Díaz's electoral alliance: Green Alliance, Drago Canaries Party, Chunta Aragonesista, Andalusian People's Initiative, Batzarre, with negotiations ongoing with Compromís, Greens Equo, United Left, Más Madrid, and Catalunya en Comú, as well as the support of other minor parties such as Sí Se Puede and Ganemos Jerez. The Movement for Dignity and Citizenship (MDyC) chose on 8 June not to join Sumar and opted out of the election. The incorporation of Podemos remained a point of friction in the negotiations, with the presence of Equality Minister Irene Montero and Podemos' representation in Sumar's lists being the main focus of divergence. In the end, following a troubling negotiation process, Podemos joined the alliance four hours ahead of the deadline to register it.

On 5 December 2023, Podemos broke with Sumar, and announced that their five MPs would be sitting in the Mixed Group, reducing Sumar's total MPs to 26.

=== Resignation of Díaz ===
In 2024, regional elections were held in Galicia, the Basque Country and Catalonia. The first of those, in February in Díaz's native region, saw Sumar receive under 2% of the total vote and no seats, while in April Sumar took one seat in the Basque Parliament. In May, Comuns Sumar took two seats fewer than En Comú Podem had taken in the 2021 Catalan regional election.

Díaz resigned on 10 June 2024, after Sumar took three seats in the 2024 European Parliament election in Spain, a figure below its target.

== Ideology ==
Sumar has been described as left-wing, far-left, and centre-left, with a "program for a new social democratic project based on workers' rights and social protection". It is also described as progressive, supportive of climate action and pro-Europeanist, despite repeatedly clashing with the European Central Bank and other European fiscal institutions on economic matters, to the point that Díaz questioned the ECB during a speech in the United Nations General Assembly. On the other hand Sumar does not mention NATO in its electoral program, but some of its members question increases in military spending to meet NATO commitments and have stated they prefer to negotiate peace in Ukraine rather than send military aid. Just before the 2023 Spanish general election, Sumar MEPs voted against two resolutions concerning political situations in Cuba and Venezuela.

== Composition ==
The table below lists parties that joined the Sumar platform:

Party	Scope
Unite Movement (MS)	Nationwide
Greens Equo (VE)	Nationwide
United Left (IU)	Nationwide
Communist Party of Spain (PCE)	Nationwide
The Dawn Marxist Organization (La Aurora (OM))	Nationwide
Republican Left (IR)	Nationwide
Unitarian Candidacy of Workers (CUT)	Andalusia
Initiative for El Hierro (IpH)	El Hierro
More Madrid (MM)	Community of Madrid
Commitment Coalition (Compromís)	Valencian Community
More–Commitment (Més) (Note: Its only deputy joined the mixed group in 2025.)	Valencian Community
Valencian People's Initiative (IdPV)	Valencian Community
Catalonia in Common (CatComú/Comuns)	Catalonia
Barcelona in Common (BComú)	Catalonia
Green Left (EV)	Catalonia
More for Mallorca (Més)	Balearic Islands
More for Menorca (MxMe)	Balearic Islands
Aragonese Union (CHA)	Aragon
Asturian Left (IAS)	Asturias
Assembly (Batzarre)	Navarre
New Canaries (NC) (Note: Since 2024.)	Canary Islands
Castilian Party–Commoners' Land (PCAS–TC)	Castile and León; Castile–La Mancha; Community of Madrid
Andalusian People's Initiative (IdPA)	Andalusia

=== Former members ===
Party	Notes
Más País (MP)	Dissolved in October 2023.
Podemos	Left in December 2023.
Green Alliance (AV)	Left in December 2023.
Drago Canaries Party (DRG)	Left in November 2024.

== Electoral performance ==
=== Cortes Generales ===
Cortes Generales
Election	Leading candidate	Congress			Senate			Gov.
Election	Leading candidate	Votes	%	Seats	Votes	%	Seats	Gov.
2023	Yolanda Díaz	3,044,996	12.3 (#4)	31 / 350	7,551,985	11.1 (#3)	0 / 208	Yes

=== European Parliament ===
European Parliament
Election	Leading candidate	Votes	%	Seats	EP Group
2024	Estrella Galán	818,015	4.7 (#5)	3 / 61	Greens/EFA; The Left

== See also ==
- Errejón affair
