= Sumar (political party) =

Political party in Spain

Unite Movement Movimiento Sumar
- Abbreviation: MS, SMR
- Coordinators: Verónica Martínez Barbero; Rosa Martínez
- Founder: Yolanda Díaz
- Founded: 30 May 2023
- Ideology: Progressivism; Green politics Social democracy Democratic socialism
- Political position: Centre-left to left-wing
- National affiliation: Sumar (2023–2026); Broad Front (since 2026); Senate of Progress (since 2026) (Note: In the Senate)
- European Parliament group: The Left
- Colours: Pink
- Congress of Deputies: 11 / 350
- Senate: 0 / 266
- European Parliament (Spanish seats): 1 / 61

Website
- movimientosumar.es

Movimiento Sumar (English: "Unite Movement", MS), also commonly referred to as simply Sumar (English: "Unite") is a progressive political party in Spain established in May 2023 ahead of the that year's general election.

== History ==
As a result of Pablo Iglesias's departure from active politics in May 2021, Labour minister—and, from July 2021, second deputy prime minister—Yolanda Díaz, came to be widely regarded as Iglesias's presumptive successor as prime ministerial candidate in the next general election. Díaz expressed her will to shape a new electoral platform transcending political parties, as well as the Unidas Podemos brand, aiming to secure the support of ideologically close forces such as En Comú Podem (ECP), Compromís and Más Madrid/Más País while giving a prevalent role to civil society.

After the 2023 Spanish general election was called for 23 July, Díaz's associates registered Movimiento Sumar as an "instrumental party" to negotiate the resource distribution with the parties that would make up the Sumar alliance, with Marta Lois as the president of the party.

== Electoral performance ==
=== Cortes Generales ===
Cortes Generales
Election	Leading candidate	Congress			Senate			Gov.
Election	Leading candidate	Votes	%	Seats	Votes	%	Seats	Gov.
2023	Yolanda Díaz	Within Sumar		10 / 350	Within Sumar		0 / 208	Yes

=== European Parliament ===
European Parliament
Election	Leading candidate	Votes	%	Seats	EP Group
2024	Estrella Galán	Within Sumar		1 / 61	The Left
