= 2012 Galician regional election =

Election in the Spanish region of Galicia

- 21 October 2012

All 75 seats in the Parliament of Galicia 38 seats needed for a majority
- Opinion polls
- Registered: 2,697,717 ▲1.9%
- Turnout: 1,481,379 (54.9%) ▼9.5 pp
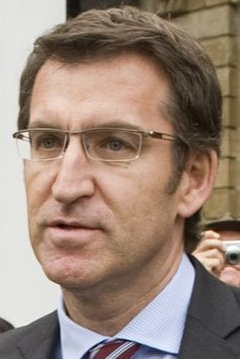

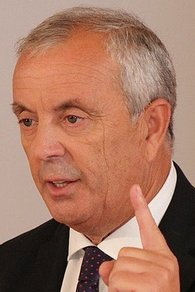

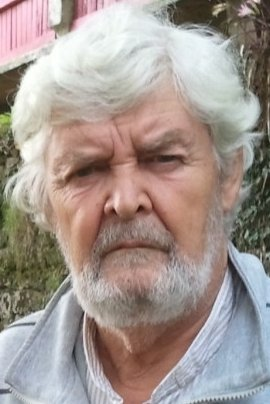

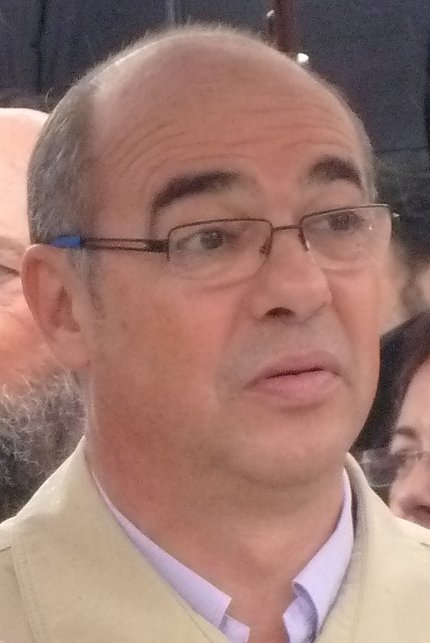
| | First party | Second party | Third party |
|---|---|---|---|
| Leader | Alberto Núñez Feijóo | Pachi Vázquez | Xosé Manuel Beiras |
| Party | PP | PSdeG–PSOE | AGE |
| Leader since | 15 January 2006 | 25 April 2009 | 7 September 2012 |
| Leader's seat | Pontevedra | Ourense | A Coruña |
| Last election | 38 seats, 46.7% | 25 seats, 31.0% | 0 seats, 1.0% (Note: Results for EU–IU in the 2009 election.) |
| Seats won | 41 | 18 | 9 |
| Seat change | ▲3 | ▼7 | ▲9 |
| Popular vote | 661,281 | 297,584 | 200,828 |
| Percentage | 45.8% | 20.6% | 13.9% |
| Swing | ▼0.9 pp | ▼10.4 pp | ▲12.9 pp |
| | Fourth party |
| Leader | Francisco Jorquera |
| Party | BNG |
| Leader since | 29 January 2012 |
| Leader's seat | A Coruña |
| Last election | 12 seats, 16.0% |
| Seats won | 7 |
| Seat change | ▼5 |
| Popular vote | 146,027 |
| Percentage | 10.1% |
| Swing | ▼5.9 pp |
- Constituency results map for the Parliament of Galicia
President before election
Alberto Núñez Feijóo
PP
President after election
Alberto Núñez Feijóo
PP

A regional election was held in Galicia on 21 October 2012 to elect the 9th Parliament of the autonomous community. All 75 seats in the Parliament were up for election. It was held concurrently with a regional election in the Basque Country.

President Alberto Núñez Feijóo announced the election following Lehendakari Patxi López's decision to schedule a Basque snap regional election for 21 October 2012. The vote was seen as an electoral test on the economic policy of Mariano Rajoy's government, which had been elected at the 2011 Spanish general election and had undertaken harsh spending cuts which had seen its popularity ratings plummet in opinion polls. Feijóo aimed at securing reelection for a second term in office at the helm of the regional People's Party (PP), for which he needed the party to retain the absolute majority it commanded in parliament to prevent an alternative coalition being formed between the Socialists' Party of Galicia (PSdeG–PSOE) and the Galician Nationalist Bloc (BNG), similarly to the one in power in the 2005–2009 period.

The election resulted in an increased majority for Feijóo, as support for both the PSdeG and BNG plunged amid internal party infighting and disillusion from left-from-centre voters. The Galician Left Alternative (AGE) alliance, headed by former BNG leader Xosé Manuel Beiras and comprising United Left (EU) and Beiras's newly created party Anova, obtained a surprise result with 200,000 votes and 14% of the share, scoring in third place regionally and displacing the PSdeG in second place in the cities of A Coruña, Ferrol and Santiago de Compostela. The fragmentation of the left-wing vote and the high abstention rate—with slightly over 45% of the electorate not casting a ballot—favoured the PP enlarging its majority despite seeing a drop of over 100,000 ballots from 2009.

== Background ==
The election was held amid a climate of falling popularity for the Spanish government under Mariano Rajoy, with the electoral campaign being focused on the austerity measures and spending cuts approved by the national PP government. In July 2012, a €65 billion-worth spending cut and a VAT rise from 18% to 21% was introduced, with such measures being heavily criticised because they were a breach of key campaign promises made by the PP in the party's election manifesto. The PP vote share had plummeted in national opinion polls from 40% to 34% as a result, raising fears within Núñez Feijóo's regional government on the possibility of losing their overall majority in the Galician regional election; this had seen an attempt to reform the regional electoral law by decreasing the size of the Parliament of Galicia from 75 to 61, under a seat apportionment that was seen as benefitting the PP's rural strongholds. The reform did not come to pass as a result of the snap poll and a lack of consensus with opposition parties for its approval.

The Galician Nationalist Bloc (BNG) had split following its 13th national assembly in January 2012 over dissatisfaction with the bloc's political line and the control exercised by the Galician People's Union (UPG). Among the splitting forces were Xosé Manuel Beiras's Encontro Irmandiño (EI), Nationalist Left (EN), Máis Galiza (+G), the Galician Nationalist Party–Galicianist Party (PNG–PG), the Galician Workers' Front (FOGA) and the Galician Socialist Space (ESG), whereas Inzar and the Socialist Collective chose to dissolve. The split parties would rally around a broad umbrella dubbed as the Novo Proxecto Común (English: "New Common Project"), which would provide the basis for the emergence of two new political forces: EI and the FOGA would join other political forces—such as the Galician People's Front (FPG) and Movemento pola Base (MpB)—into the new Renewal–Nationalist Brotherhood (Anova) party, while EN would merge with +G, ESG, PNG–PG, Terra Galega, Espazo Ecosocialista Galego and Acción Galega into the newly established Commitment to Galicia (CxG).

== Overview ==
Under the 1981 Statute of Autonomy, the Parliament of Galicia was the unicameral legislature of the homonymous autonomous community, having legislative power in devolved matters, as well as the ability to grant or withdraw confidence from a regional president. The electoral and procedural rules were supplemented by national law provisions.

=== Date ===
The term of the Parliament of Galicia expired four years after the date of its previous election, unless it was dissolved earlier. The election decree was required to be issued no later than 25 days before the scheduled expiration date of parliament and published on the following day in the Official Journal of Galicia (DOG), with election day taking place 54 days after the decree's publication. The previous election was held on 1 March 2009, which meant that the chamber's term would have expired on 1 March 2013. The election decree was required to be published in the DOG no later than 5 February 2013, setting the latest possible date for election day on 31 March 2013.

The regional president had the prerogative to dissolve the Parliament of Galicia at any given time and call a snap election, provided that it did not occur before one year after a previous one under this procedure. In the event of an investiture process failing to elect a regional president within a two-month period from the first ballot, the Parliament was to be automatically dissolved and a fresh election called.

Speculation on the 2013 Galician election being held ahead of schedule emerged after opinion polls at the end of 2011—shortly after the 2011 Spanish general election which saw a landslide victory for the People's Party (PP) across Spain—pointed to an "historic absolute majority" for the party in the region. In February 2012, Galician president Alberto Núñez Feijóo had ruled out a snap election "before the summer", a decision that he reiterated after the Andalusian regional election on 25 March had seen the PP losing over 400,000 votes in comparison to the party's 2011 general election results in the region. The media pointed out that Feijóo could be considering an autumn election instead, in order to prevent further spending cuts from the national PP government from affecting his image, On 21 August 2012, Lehendakari Patxi López's announcement of a snap Basque election for 21 October left Feijóo little room for an autumn election, and one week later he called a snap election in Galicia to be held concurrently with the Basque poll.

The Parliament of Galicia was officially dissolved on 28 August 2012 with the publication of the corresponding decree in the DOG, setting election day for 21 October and scheduling for the chamber to reconvene on 16 November.

=== Electoral system ===
Voting for the Parliament was based on universal suffrage, comprising all Spanish nationals over 18 years of age, registered in Galicia and with full political rights, provided that they had not been deprived of the right to vote by a final sentence, nor were legally incapacitated. Amendments in 2011 required non-resident citizens to apply for voting, a system known as "begged" voting (Spanish: Voto rogado).

The Parliament of Galicia had a minimum of 60 and a maximum of 80 seats, with electoral provisions fixing its size at 75. All were elected in four multi-member constituencies—corresponding to the provinces of A Coruña, Lugo, Ourense and Pontevedra, each of which was assigned an initial minimum of 10 seats and the remaining 35 distributed in proportion to population—using the D'Hondt method and closed-list proportional voting, with a five percent-threshold of valid votes (including blank ballots) in each constituency. The use of this electoral method resulted in a higher effective threshold depending on district magnitude and vote distribution.

As a result of the aforementioned allocation, each Parliament constituency was entitled the following seats:

| Seats | Constituencies |
|---|---|
| 24 | A Coruña |
| 22 | Pontevedra |
| 15 | Lugo |
| 14 | Ourense |

The law did not provide for by-elections to fill vacant seats; instead, any vacancies arising after the proclamation of candidates and during the legislative term were filled by the next candidates on the party lists or, when required, by designated substitutes.

=== Outgoing parliament ===
The table below shows the composition of the parliamentary groups in the chamber at the time of dissolution.

Parliamentary composition in August 2012
| Groups | Parties | Legislators | |
| Groups | Parties | Seats | Total |
|---|---|---|---|
| People's Parliamentary Group of Galicia | PP | 38 | 38 |
| Socialists of Galicia's Parliamentary Group | PSdeG–PSOE | 25 | 25 |
| Galician Nationalist Bloc's Parliamentary Group | BNG | 12 | 12 |

== Parties and candidates ==
The electoral law allowed for parties and federations registered in the interior ministry, alliances and groupings of electors to present lists of candidates. Parties and federations intending to form an alliance were required to inform the relevant electoral commission within 10 days of the election call, whereas groupings of electors needed to secure the signature of at least one percent of the electorate in the constituencies for which they sought election, disallowing electors from signing for more than one list. Additionally, a balanced composition of men and women was required in the electoral lists, so that candidates of either sex made up at least 40 percent of the total composition.

Below is a list of the main parties and alliances which contested the election:

| Candidacy | Parties and alliances | Leading candidate | Ideology | Previous result | | Gov. | Ref. |
| Candidacy | Parties and alliances | Leading candidate | Ideology | Vote % | Seats | Gov. | Ref. |
|---|---|---|---|---|---|---|---|
| PP | List: People's Party (PP) | Alberto Núñez Feijóo | Conservatism; Christian democracy | 46.7% | 38 | Yes | |
| PSdeG– PSOE | List: Socialists' Party of Galicia (PSdeG–PSOE) | Pachi Vázquez | Social democracy | 31.0% | 25 | No | |
| BNG | List: Galician Nationalist Bloc (BNG) – Galician People's Union (UPG) – Galician Movement for Socialism (MGS) – Abrente–Galician Democratic Left (Abrente–EDG) | Francisco Jorquera | Galician nationalism Left-wing nationalism Socialism | 16.0% | 12 | No | |
| AGE | List: Renewal–Nationalist Brotherhood (Anova) – Irmandiño Meeting (EI) – Galician People's Front (FPG) – Movement for the Grassroots (MpB) – Galician Workers' Front (FOGA); United Left (EU) – Communist Party of Galicia (PCG) – Revolutionary Workers' Party (POR) – Republican Left (IR) – Open Left (IzAb); Equo (Equo); Galician Ecosocialist Space (EcoSoGal) | Xosé Manuel Beiras | Galician nationalism Democratic socialism | 1.0% | 0 | No | |

== Campaign ==
=== Debates ===
2012 Galician regional election debates
| Date | Organizer(s) | Moderator(s) | P Present (Note: Denotes a main invitee attending the event.) NI Not invited | | | | |
| Date | Organizer(s) | Moderator(s) | PP | PSdeG | BNG | Audience | Ref. |
|---|---|---|---|---|---|---|---|
| 8 October | TVG | Marga Pazos | P Feijóo | P Vázquez | NI | 31.3% (362,000) | |
| 9 October | TVG | Marga Pazos | NI | P Vázquez | P Jorquera | 19.5% (221,000) | |
| 10 October | TVG | Marga Pazos | P Feijóo | NI | P Jorquera | 24.9% (289.000) | |

== Opinion polls ==
The tables below list opinion polling results in reverse chronological order, showing the most recent first and using the dates when the survey fieldwork was done, as opposed to the date of publication. Where the fieldwork dates are unknown, the date of publication is given instead. The highest percentage figure in each polling survey is displayed with its background shaded in the leading party's colour. If a tie ensues, this is applied to the figures with the highest percentages. The "Lead" column on the right shows the percentage-point difference between the parties with the highest percentages in a poll.

=== Voting intention estimates ===
The table below lists weighted voting intention estimates. Refusals are generally excluded from the party vote percentages, while question wording and the treatment of "don't know" responses and those not intending to vote may vary between polling organisations. When available, seat projections determined by the polling organisations are displayed below (or in place of) the percentages in a smaller font; 38 seats were required for an absolute majority in the Parliament of Galicia.

Color key:

Poll conducted after legal ban on opinion polls Exit poll

| Polling firm/Commissioner | Fieldwork date | Sample size | Turnout | PP | PSdeG–PSOE | BNG | UPyD | EU–IU | Anova | CxG | AGE | SCD | Lead |
|---|---|---|---|---|---|---|---|---|---|---|---|---|---|
| 2012 regional election | 21 Oct 2012 | —N/a | 54.9 | 45.8; 41 | 20.6; 18 | 10.1; 7 | 1.5; 0 | (Note: Within AGE.) | | 1.0; 0 | 13.9; 9 | 1.1; 0 | 25.2 |
| Ipsos/CRTVG | 21 Oct 2012 | 20,467 | ? | 44.2; 39/42 | ? 18/20 | ? 7/8 | – | | | – | ? 8/10 | – | ? |
| Sondaxe/La Voz de Galicia | 16–19 Oct 2012 | ? | ? | 44.3; 39 | 26.4; 20 | 11.5; 8 | 1.9; 0 | | | 0.8; 0 | 10.9; 8 | 0.5; 0 | 17.9 |
| Sondaxe/La Voz de Galicia | 15–18 Oct 2012 | ? | ? | 46.1; 40 | 25.2; 20 | 11.6; 8 | 1.4; 0 | | | 1.2; 0 | 10.2; 7 | 0.5; 0 | 20.9 |
| Sondaxe/La Voz de Galicia | 14–17 Oct 2012 | ? | ? | 47.1; 41 | 25.2; 20 | 11.9; 8 | 1.6; 0 | | | 1.1; 0 | 8.7; 6 | 0.6; 0 | 21.9 |
| Sondaxe/La Voz de Galicia | 13–16 Oct 2012 | ? | ? | 47.7; 40 | 25.1; 21 | 11.7; 9 | 1.5; 0 | | | 1.4; 0 | 8.4; 5 | 0.6; 0 | 22.6 |
| ASCA/Galicia Diario | 15 Oct 2012 | ? | 64 | ? 44 | ? 16/17 | ? 8/9 | – | | | – | ? 5/6 | – | ? |
| Infortécnica/Atlántico (Note: "Los indecisos y el cambio de voto dejan plenamente abierto el resultado del 21-O". La Región (in Spanish). 15 October 2012. Archived from the original on 18 October 2012.) | 15 Oct 2012 | ? | ? | ? 36/38 | ? 20/22 | ? 12/14 | – | | | ? 0/1 | ? 2/4 | ? 0/1 | ? |
| Sondaxe/La Voz de Galicia | 12–15 Oct 2012 | ? | ? | 48.3; 40 | 25.0; 21 | 11.9; 9 | 0.8; 0 | | | 1.3; 0 | 9.0; 5 | 0.6; 0 | 23.3 |
| Ipsos/Faro de Vigo | 14 Oct 2012 | 1,400 | 62.7 | 46.4; 37/41 | 25.8; 22/24 | 13.3; 9/11 | 2.5; 0 | | | 1.7; 0 | 4.3; 3/4 | 1.0; 0 | 20.6 |
| Sondaxe/La Voz de Galicia | 11–14 Oct 2012 | ? | ? | 48.5; 40 | 24.5; 21 | 12.3; 9 | 0.9; 0 | | | 0.6; 0 | 9.6; 5 | 0.6; 0 | 24.0 |
| Sondaxe/La Voz de Galicia | 10–13 Oct 2012 | ? | ? | 47.6; 39 | 24.2; 21 | 13.8; 10 | 1.0; 0 | | | 0.6; 0 | 9.7; 5 | 0.6; 0 | 23.4 |
| NC Report/La Razón (Note: "El PP consolida la mayoría absoluta". La Razón (in Spanish). 15 October 2012. Archived from the original on 18 October 2012.) | 1–13 Oct 2012 | 1,000 | 59.3 | 45.1; 38/39 | 27.0; 23 | 14.0; 11 | – | | | – | 6.2; 2/3 | – | 18.1 |
| Sondaxe/La Voz de Galicia | 9–12 Oct 2012 | ? | ? | 46.9; 39 | 24.6; 21 | 13.5; 10 | 0.9; 0 | | | 0.6; 0 | 8.9; 5 | 0.6; 0 | 22.3 |
| Sondaxe/La Voz de Galicia | 8–11 Oct 2012 | ? | ? | 49.3; 41 | 25.2; 21 | 12.6; 9 | 0.5; 0 | | | 1.0; 0 | 7.6; 4 | 0.6; 0 | 24.1 |
| Sigma Dos/El Mundo | 8–11 Oct 2012 | 1,200 | ? | 50.5; 41/44 | 21.4; 17/19 | 13.1; 9 | – | | | – | 8.7; 5/6 | 1.8 | 29.1 |
| Sondaxe/La Voz de Galicia | 7–10 Oct 2012 | ? | ? | 47.0; 40 | 25.0; 21 | 12.7; 9 | 0.9; 0 | | | 0.8; 0 | 6.9; 5 | 0.9; 0 | 22.0 |
| MyWord/Cadena SER (Note: "El ObSERvatorio de la Cadena SER. Estudio preelectoral de Galicia (15/10/2012)" (PDF). MyWord (in Spanish). 15 October 2012. Archived from the original on 20 October 2012.) | 3–10 Oct 2012 | 1,200 | ? | 42.2; 37/38 | 21.5; 19/20 | 13.9; 11/12 | 3.1; 0 | | | 1.8; 0 | 7.8; 6/7 | 1.6; 0 | 20.7 |
| Sondaxe/La Voz de Galicia | 6–9 Oct 2012 | ? | ? | 46.4; 40 | 25.7; 22 | 13.3; 10 | 1.0; 0 | | | 0.9; 0 | 6.4; 3 | 0.9; 0 | 20.7 |
| Sondaxe/La Voz de Galicia | 5–8 Oct 2012 | ? | ? | 47.3; 41 | 24.1; 20 | 15.1; 11 | 0.9; 0 | | | 1.3; 0 | 5.4; 3 | 0.7; 0 | 23.2 |
| NC Report/La Razón | 7 Oct 2012 | ? | ? | 42.4 | 27.3 | 12.9 | – | | | – | – | – | 15.1 |
| Sondaxe/La Voz de Galicia | 4–7 Oct 2012 | ? | ? | 45.7; 39 | 25.3; 21 | 15.2; 11 | 0.9; 0 | | | 0.9; 0 | 6.2; 4 | 0.6; 0 | 20.4 |
| Sondaxe/La Voz de Galicia | 3–6 Oct 2012 | ? | ? | 45.4; 39 | 27.2; 23 | 16.0; 12 | 0.8; 0 | | | 1.4; 0 | 4.9; 1 | 0.6; 0 | 18.2 |
| Sondaxe/La Voz de Galicia | 2–5 Oct 2012 | 1,600 | ? | 44.3; 39 | 26.0; 22 | 15.8; 12 | 0.7; 0 | | | 1.1; 0 | 5.0; 2 | 1.1; 0 | 18.3 |
| DYM/ABC | 1–4 Oct 2012 | 816 | ? | 49.0; 40/41 | 22.3; 18/19 | 13.3; 8 | – | | | 1.8; 1 | 10.9; 7 | – | 26.7 |
| NC Report/La Razón | 30 Sep 2012 | ? | ? | 42.7 | 25.6 | 11.2 | – | | | – | – | – | 17.1 |
| CIS | 8–25 Sep 2012 | 3,956 | ? | 44.1; 38 | 28.2; 23/24 | 15.6; 12/13 | 1.0; 0 | | | – | 4.6; 1 | – | 15.9 |
| NC Report/La Razón (Note: "El PP se hace con la mayoría absoluta en Galicia". La Razón (in Spanish). 24 September 2012. Archived from the original on 27 October 2012.) | 23 Sep 2012 | ? | ? | 43.4; 37/39 | 26.1; 23/25 | 10.9; 7/8 | ? 0/2 | | | ? 1/2 | ? 2/4 | – | 17.3 |
| Low Cost/Libertad Digital | 17–23 Sep 2012 | 1,000 | 61.5 | 45.1; 39 | 28.5; 24 | 12.0; 8 | 2.3; 0 | | | – | 6.5; 4 | – | 16.6 |
| NC Report/La Razón (Note: "El PP sigue al borde de repetir mayoría absoluta en Galicia". La Razón (in Spanish). 17 September 2012. Archived from the original on 20 October 2012.) | 16 Sep 2012 | ? | ? | 41.0; 36/38 | 27.7; 24/26 | 11.7; 9/10 | ? 0/1 | | | ? 0 | ? 3 | – | 13.3 |
| NC Report/La Razón | 9 Sep 2012 | ? | ? | 39.5; 35/37 | 27.3; 24/26 | 10.9; 9/10 | ? 0/2 | | | ? 0 | ? 3 | – | 12.2 |
| Sondaxe/La Voz de Galicia (Note: "El PP reafirma su mayoría absoluta y la coalición de EU y Beiras apunta a 3 escaños". La Voz de Galicia (in Spanish). 9 September 2012. Archived from the original on 12 September 2012.) | 31 Aug–5 Sep 2012 | 1,700 | 55.8 | 43.4; 39 | 26.4; 24 | 11.5; 9 | | | – | – | 6.1; 3 | – | 17.0 |
| NC Report/La Razón (Note: "Feijóo podría perder el escaño de la mayoría absoluta". La Razón (in Spanish). 3 September 2012. Archived from the original on 14 October 2012.) | 28 Aug–1 Sep 2012 | 592 | 54.9 | 40.6; 34/37 | 28.4; 24/25 | 11.9; 10 | 4.1; 0/2 | 4.4; 1/2 | 5.0; 2 | 3.1; 0 | – | – | 12.2 |
| ASCA/Galicia Diario | 2 Jul 2012 | ? | ? | ? 35/36 | ? 23/24 | ? 7 | ? 0/1 | ? 1/2 | ? 7 | (Note: Within Anova.) | – | – | ? |
| ASCA/Galicia Diario | 10 May 2012 | ? | ? | ? 36/38 | ? 23 | ? 7 | ? 0/1 | ? 0/1 | ? 7 | | – | – | ? |
| Sondaxe/La Voz de Galicia | 12–14 Apr 2012 | 1,700 | 54.6 | 46.1; 41 | 26.9; 24 | 13.3; 10 | – | 2.9; 0 | – | – | – | – | 19.2 |
| 2011 general election | 20 Nov 2011 | —N/a | 62.2 | 52.5 (44) | 27.8 (23) | 11.2 (8) | 1.2 (0) | 4.1 (0) | – | – | – | – | 24.7 |
| Sondaxe/La Voz de Galicia (Note: "El PP afianza con 4 escaños más su mayoría a costa de un PSOE en declive". La Voz de Galicia (in Spanish). 28 February 2011. Archived from the original on 3 March 2011.) (Note: "Informe elecciones autonómicas. Barómetro estacional. Febrero 2011" (PDF). Sondaxe (in Spanish). 28 February 2011. Archived from the original on 10 September 2016.) | 14–23 Feb 2011 | 3,600 | 65.3 | 48.8; 42 | 25.9; 21/22 | 15.1; 11/12 | – | – | – | – | – | – | 22.9 |
| Sondaxe/La Voz de Galicia (Note: "El PP reforzaría su mayoría absoluta al arrebatar dos escaños al PSdeG". La Voz de Galicia (in Spanish). 13 December 2010. Archived from the original on 16 December 2010.) (Note: "Informe elecciones autonómicas. Barómetro estacional. Noviembre 2010" (PDF). Sondaxe (in Spanish). 13 December 2010. Archived from the original on 10 September 2016.) | 18–30 Nov 2010 | 3,600 | 68.8 | 48.7; 40 | 27.1; 23 | 14.9; 12 | – | – | – | – | – | – | 21.6 |
| Sondaxe/La Voz de Galicia (Note: "Informe elecciones autonómicas. Barómetro estacional. Enero 2010" (PDF). Sondaxe (in Spanish). 7 February 2010. Archived from the original on 10 September 2016.) | 19–27 Jan 2010 | 1,200 | 69.6 | 47.9; 40 | 26.6; 23 | 14.6; 12 | – | – | – | – | – | – | 21.3 |
| 2009 EP election | 7 Jun 2009 | —N/a | 43.3 | 50.0 (42) | 35.3 (27) | 9.1 (6) | 1.2 (0) | 1.3 (0) | – | – | – | – | 14.7 |
| 2009 regional election | 1 Mar 2009 | —N/a | 64.4 | 46.7; 38 | 31.0; 25 | 16.0; 12 | 1.4; 0 | 1.0; 0 | – | – | – | – | 15.7 |

=== Voting preferences ===
The table below lists raw, unweighted voting preferences.

| Polling firm/Commissioner | Fieldwork date | Sample size | PP | PSdeG–PSOE | BNG | UPyD | EU–IU | CxG | AGE | SCD | Question | X mark | Lead |
|---|---|---|---|---|---|---|---|---|---|---|---|---|---|
| 2012 regional election (Note: Does not include non-resident citizens.) | 21 Oct 2012 | —N/a | 28.4 | 12.8 | 6.3 | 0.9 | | 0.6 | 8.7 | 0.7 | —N/a | 36.2 | 15.6 |
| Ipsos/Faro de Vigo | 14 Oct 2012 | 1,400 | 31.8 | 18.4 | 9.4 | – | | – | 2.2 | – | 15.7 | 10.8 | 13.4 |
| MyWord/Cadena SER | 3–10 Oct 2012 | 1,200 | 13.8 | 13.5 | 6.7 | 2.6 | | 0.9 | 7.3 | 1.2 | 27.4 | 13.3 | 0.3 |
| CIS | 8–25 Sep 2012 | 3,956 | 25.8 | 14.3 | 8.3 | 0.4 | | – | 3.1 | – | 25.1 | 13.1 | 11.5 |
| 2011 general election | 20 Nov 2011 | —N/a | 37.1 | 19.6 | 7.9 | 0.9 | 2.9 | – | – | – | —N/a | 28.2 | 17.5 |
| Sondaxe/La Voz de Galicia | 14–23 Feb 2011 | 3,600 | 27.9 | 11.3 | 7.6 | 1.0 | 0.1 | – | – | – | 33.7 | 11.5 | 16.6 |
| Sondaxe/La Voz de Galicia | 18–30 Nov 2010 | 3,600 | 29.6 | 10.1 | 7.7 | 0.9 | 0.1 | – | – | – | 29.7 | 13.9 | 19.5 |
| Sondaxe/La Voz de Galicia | 19–27 Jan 2010 | 1,200 | 27.4 | 12.7 | 7.0 | 0.6 | 0.7 | – | – | – | 33.3 | 12.6 | 14.7 |
| 2009 EP election | 7 Jun 2009 | —N/a | 23.8 | 16.1 | 4.4 | 0.6 | 0.6 | – | – | – | —N/a | 52.8 | 7.7 |
| 2009 regional election | 1 Mar 2009 | —N/a | 32.9 | 20.9 | 11.6 | 1.0 | 0.7 | – | – | – | —N/a | 29.5 | 12.0 |

=== Victory preferences ===
The table below lists opinion polling on the victory preferences for each party in the event of a regional election taking place.

| Polling firm/Commissioner | Fieldwork date | Sample size | PP | PSdeG–PSOE | BNG | UPyD | AGE | Other/ None | Question | Lead |
|---|---|---|---|---|---|---|---|---|---|---|
| MyWord/Cadena SER | 3–10 Oct 2012 | 1,200 | 21.8 | 19.6 | 9.7 | – | 10.4 | 11.9 | 26.6 | 2.2 |
| CIS | 8–25 Sep 2012 | 3,956 | 29.7 | 18.1 | 9.1 | 0.4 | 3.5 | 4.6 | 34.6 | 11.6 |

=== Victory likelihood ===
The table below lists opinion polling on the perceived likelihood of victory for each party in the event of a regional election taking place.

| Polling firm/Commissioner | Fieldwork date | Sample size | PP | PSdeG–PSOE | BNG | UPyD | AGE | Other/ None | Question | Lead |
|---|---|---|---|---|---|---|---|---|---|---|
| CIS | 8–25 Sep 2012 | 3,956 | 59.8 | 6.0 | 1.3 | 0.1 | 0.1 | 0.6 | 32.1 | 53.8 |

=== Preferred President ===
The table below lists opinion polling on leader preferences to become president of the Regional Government of Galicia.

| Polling firm/Commissioner | Fieldwork date | Sample size | | | | Other/ None/ Not care | Question | Lead |
| Polling firm/Commissioner | Fieldwork date | Sample size | Feijóo PP | Vázquez PSdeG | Jorquera BNG | Other/ None/ Not care | Question | Lead |
|---|---|---|---|---|---|---|---|---|
| CIS | 8–25 Sep 2012 | 3,956 | 35.2 | 12.3 | 7.0 | 22.2 | 23.3 | 22.9 |

== Results ==
=== Overall ===
← Summary of the 21 October 2012 Parliament of Galicia election results →
| Parties and alliances | Popular vote | | | Seats | |
| Parties and alliances | Votes | % | ±pp | Total | +/− |
|---|---|---|---|---|---|
| People's Party (PP) | 661,281 | 45.80 | −0.88 | 41 | +3 |
| Socialists' Party of Galicia (PSdeG–PSOE) | 297,584 | 20.61 | −10.41 | 18 | −7 |
| Galician Left Alternative (United Left–Anova) (AGE)^{1} | 200,828 | 13.91 | +12.94 | 9 | +9 |
| Galician Nationalist Bloc (BNG) | 146,027 | 10.11 | −5.90 | 7 | −5 |
| Union, Progress and Democracy (UPyD) | 21,335 | 1.48 | +0.07 | 0 | ±0 |
| Blank Seats (EB) | 17,141 | 1.19 | New | 0 | ±0 |
| Civil Society and Democracy (SCD) | 15,990 | 1.11 | New | 0 | ±0 |
| Commitment to Galicia (CxG)^{2} | 14,586 | 1.01 | −0.10 | 0 | ±0 |
| Animalist Party Against Mistreatment of Animals (PACMA) | 8,041 | 0.56 | New | 0 | ±0 |
| Ourensan Democracy (DO) | 4,245 | 0.29 | +0.23 | 0 | ±0 |
| Land Party (PT) | 3,131 | 0.22 | New | 0 | ±0 |
| Communists of Galicia (PCPE–CdG) | 1,664 | 0.12 | New | 0 | ±0 |
| Communist Unification of Spain (UCE) | 1,556 | 0.11 | New | 0 | ±0 |
| Pirates of Galicia (Pirata.gal) | 1,551 | 0.11 | New | 0 | ±0 |
| Liberal Democratic Centre (CDL) | 1,455 | 0.10 | New | 0 | ±0 |
| Spanish Phalanx of the CNSO (FE–JONS) | 1,352 | 0.09 | +0.05 | 0 | ±0 |
| Humanist Party (PH) | 1,340 | 0.09 | +0.02 | 0 | ±0 |
| For a Fairer World (PUM+J) | 1,329 | 0.09 | −0.12 | 0 | ±0 |
| Corunnan Union (UC) | 1,172 | 0.08 | New | 0 | ±0 |
| XXI Convergence (C.XXI) | 1,072 | 0.07 | New | 0 | ±0 |
| Hartos.org (Hartos.org) | 868 | 0.06 | New | 0 | ±0 |
| Internationalist Solidarity and Self-Management (SAIn) | 489 | 0.03 | +0.01 | 0 | ±0 |
| Let us Give the Change (DeC) | 432 | 0.03 | New | 0 | ±0 |
| Social Democratic Party of Law (SDD) | 412 | 0.03 | +0.01 | 0 | ±0 |
| Centre Democratic Action of Galicia (ADCG) | 360 | 0.02 | New | 0 | ±0 |
| Community Integration Party (PYC) | 159 | 0.01 | New | 0 | ±0 |
| Blank ballots | 38,448 | 2.66 | +1.00 | | |
| Total | 1,443,848 | | | 75 | ±0 |
| Valid votes | 1,443,848 | 97.47 | −1.64 | | |
| Invalid votes | 37,531 | 2.53 | +1.64 | | |
| Votes cast / turnout | 1,481,379 | 54.91 | −9.52 | | |
| Abstentions | 1,216,338 | 45.09 | +9.52 | | |
| Registered voters | 2,697,717 | | | | |
Sources
Footnotes: ^{1} Galician Left Alternative results are compared to United Left totals in the 2009 election.; ^{2} Commitment to Galicia results are compared to Terra Galega totals in the 2009 election.

Popular vote
| PP | 45.80% |
| PSdeG–PSOE | 20.61% |
| AGE | 13.91% |
| BNG | 10.11% |
| UPyD | 1.48% |
| EB | 1.19% |
| SCD | 1.11% |
| CxG | 1.01% |
| Others | 2.12% |
| Blank ballots | 2.66% |

Seats
| PP | 54.67% |
| PSdeG–PSOE | 24.00% |
| AGE | 12.00% |
| BNG | 9.33% |

=== Distribution by constituency ===
| Constituency | PP | | PSdeG | | AGE | | BNG | |
| Constituency | % | S | % | S | % | S | % | S |
|---|---|---|---|---|---|---|---|---|
| A Coruña | 45.4 | 13 | 18.8 | 5 | 16.6 | 4 | 9.6 | 2 |
| Lugo | 51.5 | 9 | 22.7 | 4 | 10.3 | 1 | 8.7 | 1 |
| Ourense | 49.2 | 8 | 23.7 | 4 | 7.8 | 1 | 8.5 | 1 |
| Pontevedra | 42.8 | 11 | 20.8 | 5 | 14.4 | 3 | 11.9 | 3 |
| Total | 45.8 | 41 | 20.6 | 18 | 13.9 | 9 | 10.1 | 7 |

== Aftermath ==
=== Government formation ===
Investiture; Nomination of Alberto Núñez Feijóo (PP)
| Ballot → | 29 November 2012 |
| Required majority → | 38 out of 75 |
| Yes: • PP (41) | 41 / 75 |
| No: • PSdeG (18); • AGE (9); • BNG (7) | 34 / 75 |
| Abstentions | 0 / 75 |
| Absentees | 0 / 75 |

== Bibliography ==
- Ley Orgánica 1/1981, de 6 de abril, de Estatuto de Autonomía para Galicia (Organic Law 1/1981). Official State Gazette (in Spanish). 6 April 1981 [version as of 17 July 2010]. BOE-A-1981-9564.
- Ley 1/1983, de 22 de febrero, reguladora de la Junta y su Presidente (Law 1/1983). Official State Gazette (in Spanish). 22 February 1983 [version as of 8 August 2007]. BOE-A-1983-23788.
- Ley Orgánica 5/1985, de 19 de junio, del Régimen Electoral General (Organic Law 5/1985). Official State Gazette (in Spanish). 19 June 1985 [version as of 22 September 2012]. BOE-A-1985-11672.
- Ley 8/1985, de 13 de agosto, de elecciones al Parlamento de Galicia (Law 8/1985). Official State Gazette (in Spanish). 13 August 1985 [version as of 13 August 2012]. BOE-A-1985-21380.
- Decreto 174/2012, del 27 de agosto, de disolución del Parlamento de Galicia y de convocatoria de elecciones (PDF) (Decree 174/2012). Official Journal of Galicia (in Spanish). 27 August 2012.
