= Pontevedra (Parliament of Galicia constituency) =

Coordinates: 42°30′N 8°30′W

- Parliament of Galicia; Electoral constituency
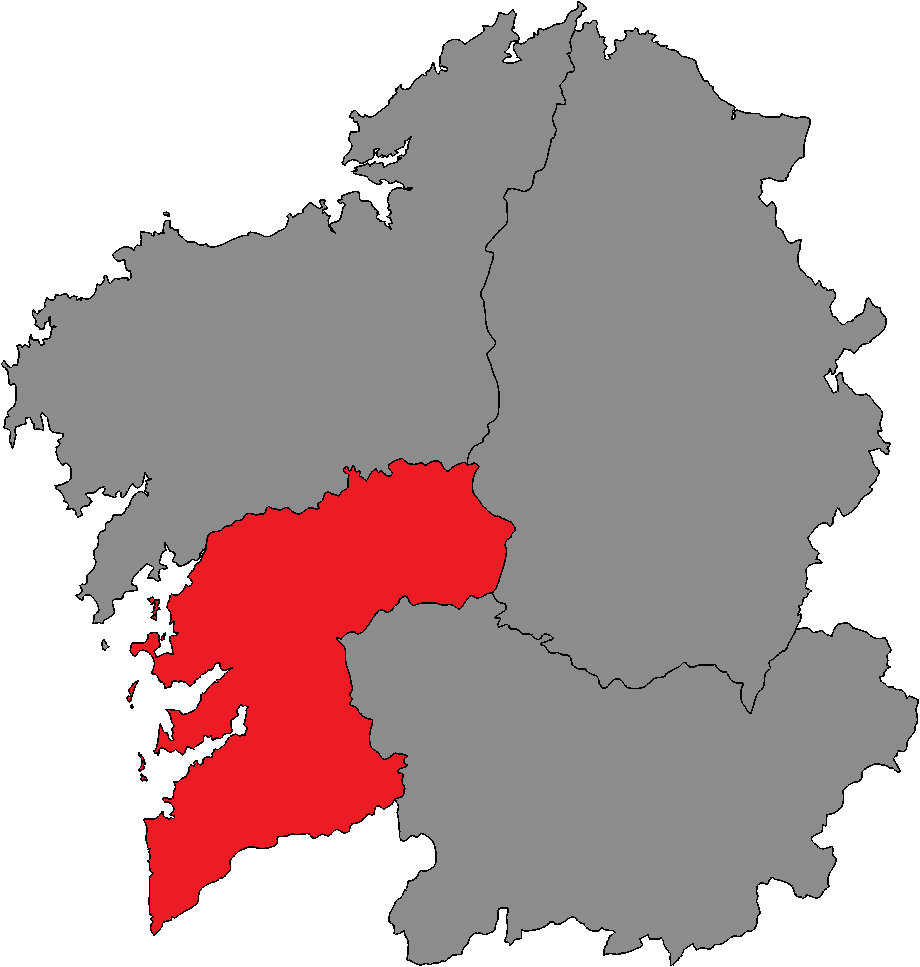
- Location of Pontevedra within Galicia
- Province: Pontevedra
- Autonomous community: Galicia
- Population: ▲945,599 (2024)
- Electorate: ▲911,709 (2024)
- Major settlements: Vigo, Pontevedra

Current constituency
- Created: 1981
- Seats: 19 (1981–1989); 21 (1989–1997); 22 (1997–present)
- Members: PP (11); BNG (8); PSdeG (3)

Pontevedra is one of the four constituencies (Spanish: circunscripciones) represented in the Parliament of Galicia, the regional legislature of the autonomous community of Galicia. The constituency currently elects 22 deputies. Its boundaries correspond to those of the Spanish province of Pontevedra. The electoral system uses the D'Hondt method and closed-list proportional representation, with a minimum threshold of five percent.

== Electoral system ==
The constituency was created as per the Statute of Autonomy for Galicia of 1981 and was first contested in the 1981 regional election. The Statute provided for the four provinces in Galicia—A Coruña, Lugo, Ourense and Pontevedra—to be established as multi-member districts in the Parliament of Galicia, with this regulation being maintained under the 1985 regional electoral law. Each constituency is entitled to an initial minimum of 10 seats, with the remaining 35 being distributed in proportion to their populations. In the 1981 and 1985 elections, each constituency was allocated a fixed number of seats: 22 for A Coruña, 15 for Lugo, 15 for Ourense and 19 for Pontevedra.

Voting is on the basis of universal suffrage, which comprises all nationals over eighteen, registered in Galicia and in full enjoyment of their political rights. Amendments to the electoral law in 2011 required for Galicians abroad to apply for voting before being permitted to vote, a system known as "begged" or expat vote (Spanish: Voto rogado) which was abolished in 2022. Seats are elected using the D'Hondt method and a closed list proportional representation, with an electoral threshold of five percent of valid votes—which includes blank ballots; until a 1993 reform, the threshold was set at three percent—being applied in each constituency. The use of the D'Hondt method may result in a higher effective threshold, depending on the district magnitude.

The electoral law allows for parties and federations registered in the interior ministry, coalitions and groupings of electors to present lists of candidates. Parties and federations intending to form a coalition ahead of an election are required to inform the relevant Electoral Commission within ten days of the election call—fifteen before 1985—whereas groupings of electors need to secure the signature of at least one percent of the electorate in the constituencies for which they seek election—one-thousandth of the electorate, with a compulsory minimum of 500 signatures, until 1985—disallowing electors from signing for more than one list of candidates.

== Deputies ==
Deputies 1981–present
Key to parties BNPG/BNG AGE En Marea EG PSG–EG PSdeG CG UCD PP CP AP
Parliament	Election	Distribution
1st	1981	1 / 1 / 4 / 6 / 7
2nd	1985	2 / 6 / 2 / 9
3rd	1989	2 / 1 / 7 / 11
4th	1993	4 / 5 / 12
5th	1997	6 / 4 / 12
6th	2001	5 / 5 / 12
7th	2005	4 / 8 / 10
8th	2009	4 / 7 / 11
9th	2012	3 / 3 / 5 / 11
10th	2016	2 / 5 / 4 / 11
11th	2020	6 / 5 / 11
12th	2024	8 / 3 / 11

== Regional elections ==
=== 2024 ===
Summary of the 18 February 2024 Parliament of Galicia election results in Pontevedra
Parties and alliances	Popular vote			Seats	
Parties and alliances	Votes	%	±pp	Total	+/−
People's Party (PP)	230,245	44.04	+1.67	11	±0
Galician Nationalist Bloc (BNG)	180,068	34.44	+9.77	8	+2
Socialists' Party of Galicia (PSdeG–PSOE)	77,112	14.75	–8.34	3	–2
Unite Galicia (Sumar Galicia)^{1}	12,818	2.45	n/a	0	±0
Vox (Vox)	12,168	2.33	+0.37	0	±0
Animalist Party with the Environment (PACMA)^{2}	2,404	0.46	–0.08	0	±0
We Can Galicia (Podemos–AV)^{1}	1,731	0.33	n/a	0	±0
Blank Seats (EB)	962	0.18	+0.08	0	±0
For a Fairer World (PUM+J)	542	0.10	+0.04	0	±0
Galicianist Common Space (ECG)	378	0.07	New	0	±0
Blank ballots	4,346	0.83	+0.03		
Total	522,774			22	±0
Valid votes	522,774	98.96	–0.15		
Invalid votes	5,469	1.04	+0.15		
Votes cast / turnout	528,243	57.94	+7.50		
Abstentions	383,466	42.06	–7.50		
Registered voters	911,709				
Sources
Footnotes: ^{1} Within the Galicia in Common–Renewal–Tides alliance in the 2020 election.; ^{2} Animalist Party with the Environment results are compared to Animalist Party Against Mistreatment of Animals totals in the 2020 election.

=== 2020 ===
Summary of the 12 July 2020 Parliament of Galicia election results in Pontevedra
Parties and alliances	Popular vote			Seats	
Parties and alliances	Votes	%	±pp	Total	+/−
People's Party (PP)	192,187	42.37	–0.92	11	±0
Galician Nationalist Bloc (BNG)	111,901	24.67	+15.72	6	+4
Socialists' Party of Galicia (PSdeG–PSOE)	104,734	23.09	+4.73	5	+1
Galicia in Common–Renewal–Tides (Podemos–EU–Anova)^{1}	20,772	4.58	–17.39	0	–5
Vox (Vox)	8,867	1.96	New	0	±0
Citizens–Party of the Citizenry (Cs)	4,748	1.05	–2.84	0	±0
Animalist Party Against Mistreatment of Animals (PACMA)	2,459	0.54	–0.69	0	±0
Galicianist Tide (En Marea–CxG–PG)^{2}	1,039	0.23	–0.02	0	±0
Citizens of Galicia Democratic Action (ADCG)	559	0.12	+0.05	0	±0
United for the Future! (Unidos SI–UDP–DEF)	533	0.12	New	0	±0
Blank Seats (EB)	460	0.10	–0.13	0	±0
Zero Cuts–Common Space–The Greens–Municipalists (RC–EsCo–OV–M)	427	0.09	–0.09	0	±0
Equo Galicia (Equo)	368	0.08	New	0	±0
Communist Party of the Workers of Galicia (PCTG)	350	0.08	New	0	±0
For a Fairer World (PUM+J)	273	0.06	New	0	±0
Union, Progress and Democracy (UPyD)	230	0.05	New	0	±0
Blank ballots	3,647	0.80	–0.07		
Total	453,554			22	±0
Valid votes	453,554	99.11	+0.17		
Invalid votes	4,059	0.89	–0.17		
Votes cast / turnout	457,613	50.44	–4.70		
Abstentions	449,574	49.56	+4.70		
Registered voters	907,187				
Sources
Footnotes: ^{1} Galicia in Common–Renewal–Tides results are compared to In Tide totals in the 2016 election.; ^{2} Galicianist Tide results are compared to Commitment to Galicia totals in the 2016 election.

=== 2016 ===
Summary of the 25 September 2016 Parliament of Galicia election results in Pontevedra
Parties and alliances	Popular vote			Seats	
Parties and alliances	Votes	%	±pp	Total	+/−
People's Party (PP)	213,045	43.29	+0.48	11	±0
In Tide (En Marea)^{1}	108,123	21.97	+7.55	5	+2
Socialists' Party of Galicia (PSdeG–PSOE)	90,342	18.36	–2.45	4	–1
Galician Nationalist Bloc–We–Galician Candidacy (BNG–Nós)	44,063	8.95	–2.92	2	–1
Citizens–Party of the Citizenry (C's)	19,153	3.89	New	0	±0
Animalist Party Against Mistreatment of Animals (PACMA)	6,071	1.23	+0.62	0	±0
Commitment to Galicia (CxG)	1,243	0.25	–0.70	0	±0
Blank Seats (EB)	1,111	0.23	–0.77	0	±0
Anti-Corruption and Justice Party (PAyJ)	1,019	0.21	New	0	±0
Let's Win Galicia: Yes We Can (Gañemos)	971	0.20	New	0	±0
Zero Cuts–Green Group (Recortes Cero–GV)	865	0.18	New	0	±0
Citizens–Centrum (C–C)	694	0.14	New	0	±0
Communists of Galicia (PCPE–CdG)	520	0.11	–0.04	0	±0
Citizens of Galicia Democratic Action (ADCG)	362	0.07	New	0	±0
XXI Convergence (C21)	228	0.05	–0.05	0	±0
Blank ballots	4,276	0.87	–1.56		
Total	492,086			22	±0
Valid votes	492,086	98.94	+1.71		
Invalid votes	5,287	1.06	–1.71		
Votes cast / turnout	497,373	55.14	–1.24		
Abstentions	404,624	44.86	+1.24		
Registered voters	901,997				
Sources
Footnotes: ^{1} In Tide results are compared to Galician Left Alternative totals in the 2012 election.

=== 2012 ===
Summary of the 21 October 2012 Parliament of Galicia election results in Pontevedra
Parties and alliances	Popular vote			Seats	
Parties and alliances	Votes	%	±pp	Total	+/−
People's Party (PP)	209,804	42.81	–4.08	11	±0
Socialists' Party of Galicia (PSdeG–PSOE)	101,988	20.81	–9.71	5	–2
Galician Left Alternative (United Left–Anova) (AGE)^{1}	70,666	14.42	+13.28	3	+3
Galician Nationalist Bloc (BNG)	58,197	11.87	–5.07	3	–1
Civil Society and Democracy (SCD)	9,605	1.96	New	0	±0
Union, Progress and Democracy (UPyD)	8,016	1.64	+0.17	0	±0
Blank Seats (EB)	4,913	1.00	New	0	±0
Commitment to Galicia (CxG)^{2}	4,640	0.95	+0.81	0	±0
Animalist Party Against Mistreatment of Animals (PACMA)	3,006	0.61	New	0	±0
Pirates of Galicia (Pirata.gal)	1,215	0.25	New	0	±0
Land Party (PT)	868	0.18	New	0	±0
Communists of Galicia (PCPE–CdG)	735	0.15	New	0	±0
For a Fairer World (PUM+J)	710	0.14	–0.07	0	±0
Humanist Party (PH)	600	0.12	+0.04	0	±0
Liberal Democratic Centre (CDL)	590	0.12	New	0	±0
Communist Unification of Spain (UCE)	505	0.10	New	0	±0
XXI Convergence (C.XXI)	503	0.10	New	0	±0
Spanish Phalanx of the CNSO (FE–JONS)	435	0.09	+0.02	0	±0
Let us Give the Change (DeC)	432	0.09	New	0	±0
Social Democratic Party of Law (SDD)	412	0.08	+0.03	0	±0
Centre Democratic Action of Galicia (ADCG)	360	0.07	New	0	±0
Blank ballots	11,890	2.43	+0.87		
Total	490,090			22	±0
Valid votes	490,090	97.23	–1.80		
Invalid votes	13,961	2.77	+1.80		
Votes cast / turnout	504,051	56.38	–8.93		
Abstentions	389,934	43.62	+8.93		
Registered voters	893,985				
Sources
Footnotes: ^{1} Galician Left Alternative results are compared to United Left totals in the 2009 election.; ^{2} Commitment to Galicia results are compared to Terra Galega totals in the 2009 election.

=== 2009 ===
Summary of the 1 March 2009 Parliament of Galicia election results in Pontevedra
Parties and alliances	Popular vote			Seats	
Parties and alliances	Votes	%	±pp	Total	+/−
People's Party (PP)	265,222	46.89	+2.78	11	+1
Socialists' Party of Galicia (PSdeG–PSOE)	172,616	30.52	–3.12	7	–1
Galician Nationalist Bloc (BNG)	95,827	16.94	–2.22	4	±0
Union, Progress and Democracy (UPyD)	8,333	1.47	New	0	±0
United Left (EU–IU)	6,427	1.14	+0.38	0	±0
The Greens–Green Group (OV–GV)	2,802	0.50	New	0	±0
Galician People's Front (FPG)	1,533	0.27	–0.03	0	±0
For a Fairer World (PUM+J)	1,177	0.21	New	0	±0
Galician Land (TeGa)	809	0.14	New	0	±0
We–People's Unity (Nós–UP)	567	0.10	–0.03	0	±0
Humanist Party (PH)	460	0.08	New	0	±0
Spanish Phalanx of the CNSO (FE–JONS)	408	0.07	–0.01	0	±0
More Galicia (+G)	398	0.07	New	0	±0
Social Democratic Party of Law (SDD)	262	0.05	+0.01	0	±0
Blank ballots	8,814	1.56	+0.25		
Total	565,655			22	±0
Valid votes	565,655	99.03	–0.49		
Invalid votes	5,531	0.97	+0.49		
Votes cast / turnout	571,186	65.31	+1.73		
Abstentions	303,333	34.69	–1.73		
Registered voters	874,519				

=== 2005 ===
Summary of the 19 June 2005 Parliament of Galicia election results in Pontevedra
Parties and alliances	Popular vote			Seats	
Parties and alliances	Votes	%	±pp	Total	+/−
People's Party (PP)	238,950	44.11	–6.74	10	–2
Socialists' Party of Galicia (PSdeG–PSOE)	182,207	33.64	+11.96	8	+3
Galician Nationalist Bloc (BNG)	103,767	19.16	–3.94	4	–1
United Left (EU–IU)	4,126	0.76	–0.06	0	±0
Galician People's Front (FPG)	1,630	0.30	+0.03	0	±0
Party of Self-employed and Professionals (AUTONOMO)	872	0.16	–0.08	0	±0
Democratic and Social Centre (CDS)	839	0.15	New	0	±0
We–People's Unity (Nós–UP)	678	0.13	New	0	±0
Spanish Phalanx of the CNSO (FE–JONS)	452	0.08	New	0	±0
People's Spanish Social Party (PSEP)	420	0.08	New	0	±0
Republican Left–Galician Republican Left (IR–ERG)	405	0.07	New	0	±0
Social Democratic Party of Law (SDD)	239	0.04	–0.09	0	±0
Blank ballots	7,113	1.31	–0.61		
Total	541,698			22	±0
Valid votes	541,698	99.52	+0.25		
Invalid votes	2,606	0.48	–0.25		
Votes cast / turnout	544,304	63.58	+4.02		
Abstentions	311,812	36.42	–4.02		
Registered voters	856,116				

=== 2001 ===
Summary of the 21 October 2001 Parliament of Galicia election results in Pontevedra
Parties and alliances	Popular vote			Seats	
Parties and alliances	Votes	%	±pp	Total	+/−
People's Party (PP)	250,036	50.85	+0.05	12	±0
Galician Nationalist Bloc (BNG)	113,582	23.10	–3.56	5	–1
Socialists' Party of Galicia (PSdeG–PSOE)	106,624	21.68	+2.84	5	+1
United Left (EU–IU)	4,048	0.82	–0.18	0	±0
Left of Galicia (EdeG)	1,703	0.35	New	0	±0
Galician Progressive Democracy (DPG)	1,695	0.34	–0.16	0	±0
Humanist Party (PH)	1,444	0.29	+0.10	0	±0
Galician People's Front (FPG)	1,313	0.27	+0.03	0	±0
Party of Self-employed and Professionals (AUTONOMO)	1,182	0.24	New	0	±0
Social Democratic Party of Law (SDD)	646	0.13	–0.09	0	±0
Blank ballots	9,444	1.92	+0.45		
Total	491,717			22	±0
Valid votes	491,717	99.27	–0.27		
Invalid votes	3,609	0.73	+0.27		
Votes cast / turnout	495,326	59.56	–3.19		
Abstentions	336,317	40.44	+3.19		
Registered voters	831,643				

=== 1997 ===
Summary of the 19 October 1997 Parliament of Galicia election results in Pontevedra
Parties and alliances	Popular vote			Seats	
Parties and alliances	Votes	%	±pp	Total	+/−
People's Party (PP)	261,781	50.80	–2.19	12	±0
Galician Nationalist Bloc (BNG)	137,385	26.66	+8.29	6	+2
Socialists' Party–Galician Left–The Greens (PSdeG–PSOE/EU–EG/Os Verdes)^{1}	97,082	18.84	–7.41	4	–1
United Left (IU)	5,146	1.00	New	0	±0
Galician Democracy (DG)	2,599	0.50	New	0	±0
Galician People's Front (FPG)	1,236	0.24	New	0	±0
Social Democratic Party of Law (SDD)	1,129	0.22	New	0	±0
Humanist Party (PH)	970	0.19	+0.01	0	±0
Galician Phalanx of the CNSO (FG–JONS)	392	0.08	New	0	±0
Blank ballots	7,558	1.47	+0.50		
Total	515,278			22	+1
Valid votes	515,278	99.54	–0.07		
Invalid votes	2,393	0.46	+0.07		
Votes cast / turnout	517,671	62.75	–2.78		
Abstentions	307,290	37.25	+2.78		
Registered voters	824,961				
Sources
Footnotes: ^{1} Socialists' Party–Galician Left–The Greens results are compared to the combined totals of the Socialists' Party of Galicia, United Left–Galician Unity and The Greens of Galicia in the 1993 election.

=== 1993 ===
Summary of the 17 October 1993 Parliament of Galicia election results in Pontevedra
Parties and alliances	Popular vote			Seats	
Parties and alliances	Votes	%	±pp	Total	+/−
People's Party (PP)	250,309	52.99	+7.16	12	+1
Socialists' Party of Galicia (PSdeG–PSOE)	104,152	22.05	–8.14	5	–2
Galician Nationalist Bloc (BNG)^{1}	86,768	18.37	+9.28	4	+2
United Left–Galician Unity (EU–UG)^{2}	18,330	3.88	–2.85	0	–1
Galician Coalition (CG)	1,959	0.41	–2.71	0	±0
Ruiz-Mateos Group–European Democratic Alliance (ARM–ADE)	1,760	0.37	–0.10	0	±0
The Greens of Galicia (Os Verdes)	1,523	0.32	+0.06	0	±0
The Ecologists (LE)	1,221	0.26	+0.01	0	±0
Humanist Citizen Platform (PCH)	857	0.18	+0.10	0	±0
United People's Assembly (APU)	520	0.11	New	0	±0
Galician Alternative (AG)	375	0.08	New	0	±0
Blank ballots	4,583	0.97	+0.53		
Total	472,357			21	±0
Valid votes	472,357	99.61	+0.23		
Invalid votes	1,864	0.39	–0.23		
Votes cast / turnout	474,221	65.53	+4.78		
Abstentions	249,460	34.47	–4.78		
Registered voters	723,681				
Sources
Footnotes: ^{1} Galician Nationalist Bloc results are compared to the combined totals of Galician Nationalist Bloc and Galician Nationalist Party–Galicianist Party totals in the 1989 election.; ^{2} United Left–Galician Unity results are compared to the combined totals of Galician Socialist Party–Galician Left and United Left totals in the 1989 election.

=== 1989 ===
Summary of the 17 December 1989 Parliament of Galicia election results in Pontevedra
Parties and alliances	Popular vote			Seats	
Parties and alliances	Votes	%	±pp	Total	+/−
People's Party (PP)^{1}	189,023	45.83	+2.83	11	+2
Socialists' Party of Galicia (PSdeG–PSOE)	124,516	30.19	+2.78	7	+1
Galician Nationalist Bloc (BNG)	33,458	8.11	+4.18	2	+2
Galician Socialist Party–Galician Left (PSG–EG)	21,141	5.13	–3.47	1	–1
Galician Coalition (CG)	12,869	3.12	–5.77	0	–2
Democratic and Social Centre (CDS)	10,780	2.61	–1.09	0	±0
United Left (EU)^{2}	6,603	1.60	+0.72	0	±0
Galician Nationalist Party–Galicianist Party (PNG–PG)	4,087	0.98	New	0	±0
Ruiz-Mateos Group (ARM)	1,920	0.47	New	0	±0
Workers' Socialist Party (PST)	1,396	0.34	–0.58	0	±0
Galician People's Front (FPG)	1,206	0.29	New	0	±0
The Greens of Galicia (OVG)	1,092	0.26	New	0	±0
The Ecologist Greens (OVE)	1,050	0.25	New	0	±0
Communist Party of the Galician People (PCPG)	492	0.12	New	0	±0
Humanist Platform (PH)	350	0.08	–0.63	0	±0
Spanish Phalanx of the CNSO (FE–JONS)	260	0.06	–0.23	0	±0
Alliance for the Republic (AxR)	239	0.06	New	0	±0
Communist Party of Spain (Marxist–Leninist) (PCE (m–l))	155	0.04	–0.10	0	±0
Blank ballots	1,823	0.44	–0.24		
Total	412,460			21	+2
Valid votes	412,460	99.38	+0.25		
Invalid votes	2,564	0.62	–0.25		
Votes cast / turnout	415,024	60.66	+1.56		
Abstentions	269,184	39.34	–1.56		
Registered voters	684,208				
Sources
Footnotes: ^{1} People's Party results are compared to People's Coalition totals in the 1985 election.; ^{2} United Left results are compared to Communist Party of Galicia totals in the 1985 election.

=== 1985 ===
Summary of the 24 November 1985 Parliament of Galicia election results in Pontevedra
Parties and alliances	Popular vote			Seats	
Parties and alliances	Votes	%	±pp	Total	+/−
People's Coalition (AP–PDP–PL)^{1}	171,013	43.00	+14.39	9	+2
Socialists' Party of Galicia (PSdG–PSOE)	108,997	27.41	+10.22	6	+2
Galician Coalition (CG)	35,359	8.89	New	2	+2
Galician Socialist Party–Galician Left (PSG–EG)^{2}	34,220	8.60	+2.70	2	+1
Galician Nationalist Bloc (BNG)^{3}	15,632	3.93	–1.54	0	–1
Democratic and Social Centre (CDS)	14,715	3.70	New	0	±0
Workers' Socialist Party (PST)	3,663	0.92	–0.76	0	±0
Communist Party of Galicia (PCE–PCG)	3,510	0.88	–2.50	0	±0
Communist Party of Galicia (Revolutionary Marxist) (PCG (m–r))	2,902	0.73	New	0	±0
Humanist Platform (PH)	2,823	0.71	New	0	±0
Spanish Phalanx of the CNSO (FE–JONS)	1,167	0.29	+0.11	0	±0
Communist Party of Spain (Marxist–Leninist) (PCE (m–l))	556	0.14	New	0	±0
Communist Movement of Galicia (MCG)	456	0.11	–0.43	0	±0
Union of the Democratic Centre (UCD)	n/a	n/a	–28.19	0	–6
Blank ballots	2,696	0.68	+0.68		
Total	397,709			19	±0
Valid votes	397,709	99.13	+0.94		
Invalid votes	3,508	0.87	–0.94		
Votes cast / turnout	401,217	59.10	+9.67		
Abstentions	277,609	40.90	–9.67		
Registered voters	678,826				
Sources
Footnotes: ^{1} People's Coalition results are compared to People's Alliance totals in the 1981 election.; ^{2} Galician Socialist Party–Galician Left results are compared to Galician Left totals in the 1981 election.; ^{3} Galician Nationalist Bloc results are compared to Galician National-Popular Bloc–Galician Socialist Party totals in the 1981 election.

=== 1981 ===
Summary of the 20 October 1981 Parliament of Galicia election results in Pontevedra
Parties and alliances	Popular vote			Seats	
Parties and alliances	Votes	%	±pp	Total	+/−
People's Alliance (AP)	89,058	28.61	n/a	7	n/a
Union of the Democratic Centre (UCD)	87,764	28.19	n/a	6	n/a
Socialists' Party of Galicia (PSdG–PSOE)	53,505	17.19	n/a	4	n/a
Galician Left (EG)	18,353	5.90	n/a	1	n/a
Galician National-Popular Bloc–Galician Socialist Party (BNPG–PSG)	17,015	5.47	n/a	1	n/a
Galicianist Party (PG)	12,311	3.95	n/a	0	n/a
Communist Party of Galicia (PCG–PCE)	10,529	3.38	n/a	0	n/a
Workers' Socialist Party (PST)	5,240	1.68	n/a	0	n/a
Galician Brotherhood (IG)	4,929	1.58	n/a	0	n/a
Galician Socialist Unity–PSOE (USG–PSOE)	3,511	1.13	n/a	0	n/a
Spanish Democratic Right (DDE)	2,022	0.65	n/a	0	n/a
New Force (FN)	1,706	0.55	n/a	0	n/a
Spanish Ruralist Party (PRE)	1,674	0.54	n/a	0	n/a
Revolutionary Communist League–Communist Movement (LCR–MCG)	1,674	0.54	n/a	0	n/a
Liberated Galiza (GC)	1,433	0.46	n/a	0	n/a
Spanish Phalanx of the CNSO (FE–JONS)	553	0.18	n/a	0	n/a
Blank ballots	0	0.00	n/a		
Total	311,277			19	n/a
Valid votes	311,277	98.19	n/a		
Invalid votes	5,751	1.81	n/a		
Votes cast / turnout	317,028	49.43	n/a		
Abstentions	324,302	50.57	n/a		
Registered voters	641,330				
