= 2016 Galician regional election =

Election in the Spanish region of Galicia

- 25 September 2016

All 75 seats in the Parliament of Galicia 38 seats needed for a majority
- Opinion polls
- Registered: 2,701,932 ▲0.2%
- Turnout: 1,448,962 (53.6%) ▼1.3 pp
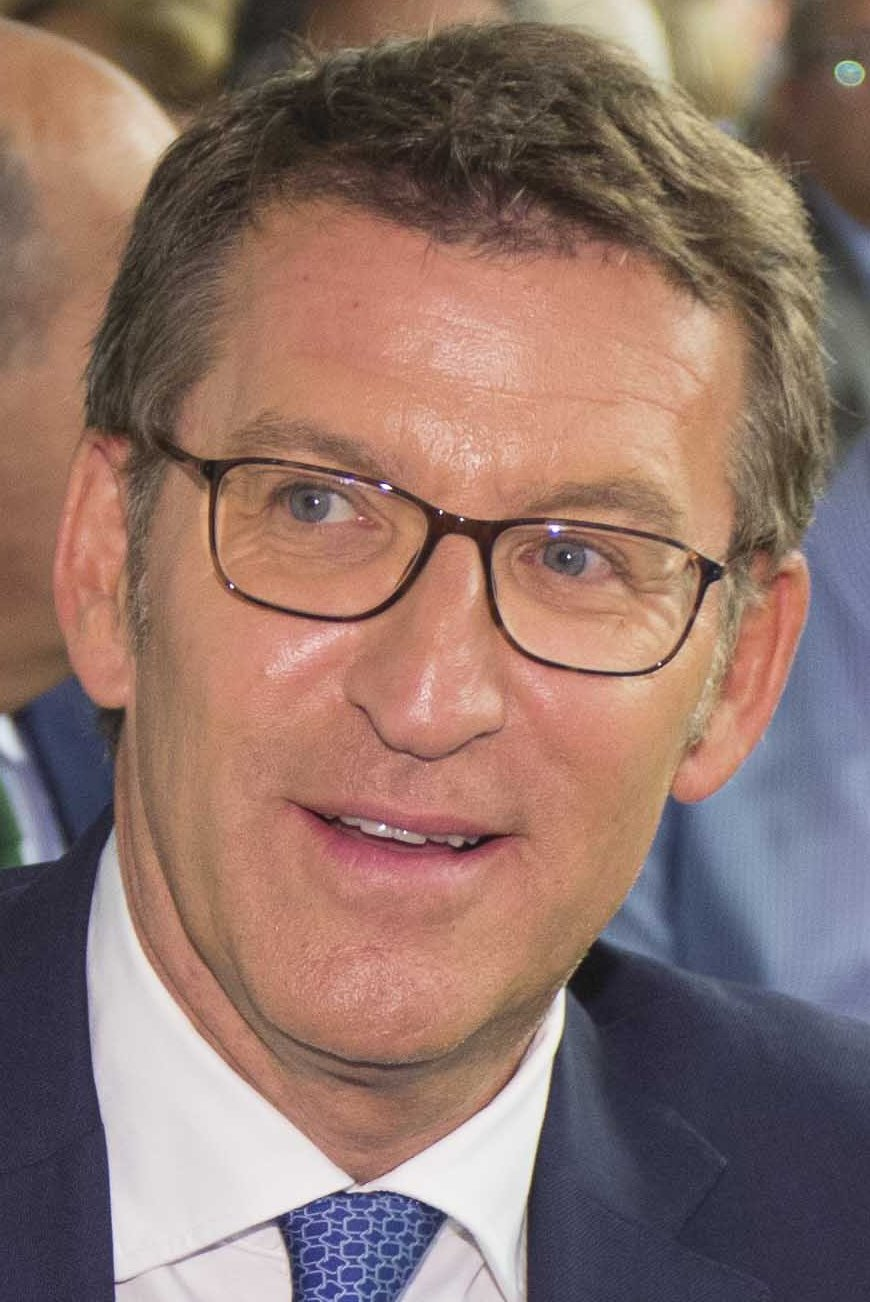

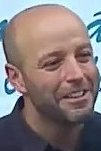

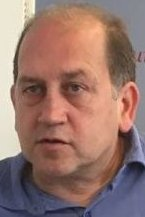

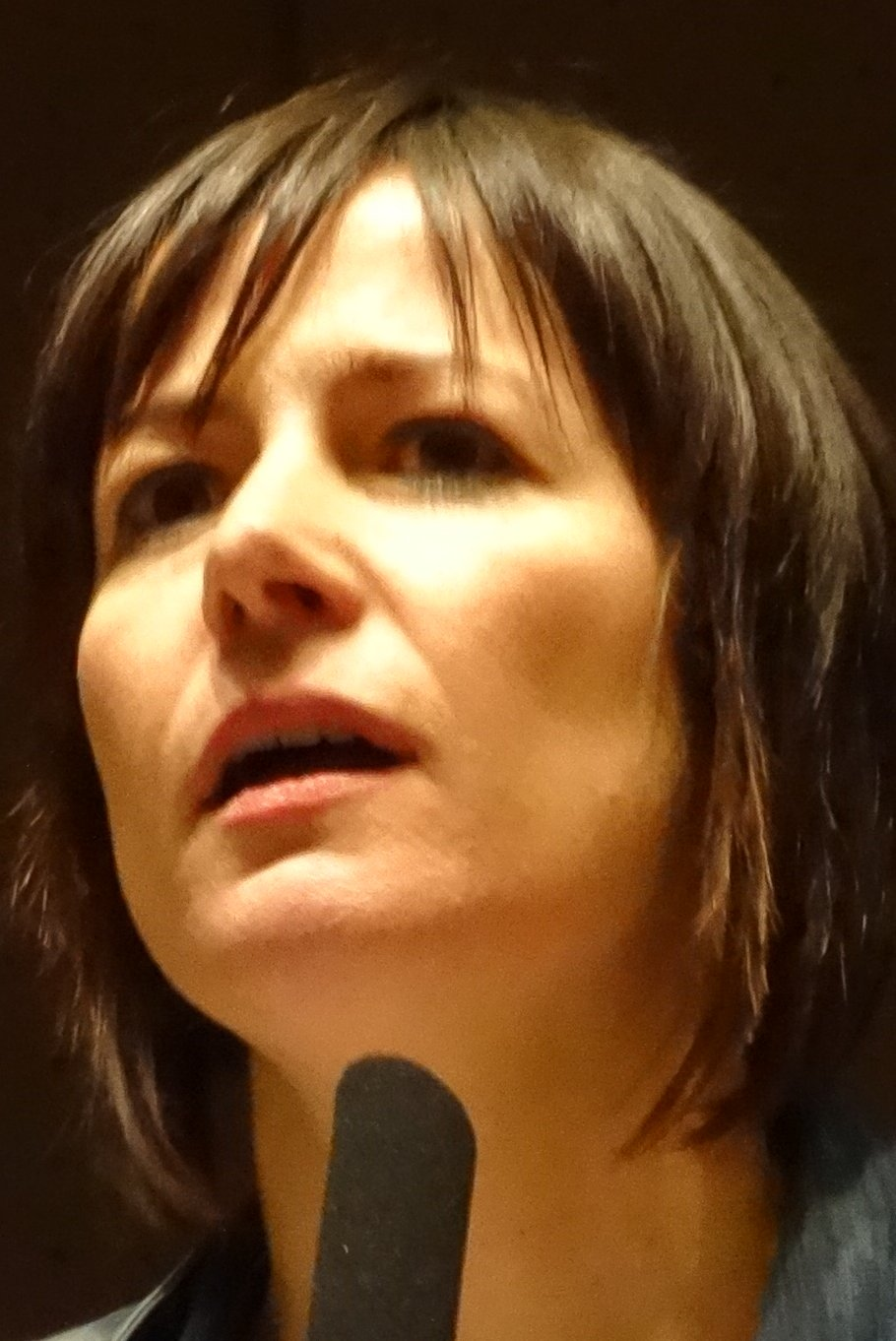
| | First party | Second party | Third party |
|---|---|---|---|
| Leader | Alberto Núñez Feijóo | Luis Villares | Xoaquín Fernández Leiceaga |
| Party | PP | En Marea | PSdeG–PSOE |
| Leader since | 15 January 2006 | 19 August 2016 | 28 May 2016 |
| Leader's seat | Pontevedra | Lugo | A Coruña |
| Last election | 41 seats, 45.8% | 9 seats, 13.9% (Note: Results for AGE in the 2012 election.) | 18 seats, 20.6% |
| Seats won | 41 | 14 | 14 |
| Seat change | 0 | ▲5 | ▼4 |
| Popular vote | 682,150 | 273,523 | 256,381 |
| Percentage | 47.6% | 19.1% | 17.9% |
| Swing | ▲1.8 pp | ▲5.2 pp | ▼2.7 pp |
| | Fourth party |
| Leader | Ana Pontón |
| Party | BNG–Nós |
| Leader since | 28 February 2016 |
| Leader's seat | A Coruña |
| Last election | 7 seats, 10.1% |
| Seats won | 6 |
| Seat change | ▼1 |
| Popular vote | 119,446 |
| Percentage | 8.3% |
| Swing | ▼1.8 pp |
- Constituency results map for the Parliament of Galicia
President before election
Alberto Núñez Feijóo
PP
President after election
Alberto Núñez Feijóo
PP

A regional election was held in Galicia on 25 September 2016 to elect the 10th Parliament of the autonomous community. All 75 seats in the Parliament were up for election. It was held concurrently with a regional election in the Basque Country.

Alberto Núñez Feijóo announced the election would be brought forward to September, after initially scheduling to hold it throughout October, following Lehendakari Iñigo Urkullu's announcement of a Basque election for 25 September. Feijóo defended his decision in that it would make "no sense" to hold the election only weeks after the Basque poll, specially considering the state of political instability in Spain over the government formation process after the general election in June. The election took place in a situation in which the Spanish political landscape had undergone a major transformation within a short time, with a decrease in support for the People's Party (PP) and the Spanish Socialist Workers' Party (PSOE) nationally and the emergence of new parties such as Podemos and Citizens (C's).

Feijóo's PP, with 47.6% and 41 seats, went on to secure a third consecutive absolute majority, the only one at the time in Spain after the 2015 electoral cycle. The Podemos-supported En Marea list, which had already achieved major breakthroughs in the region at the 2015 and 2016 general elections, placed narrowly ahead of the Socialists' Party of Galicia (PSdeG–PSOE) which scored the worst result of its history in a Galician regional election. Concurrently, the Galician Nationalist Bloc (BNG) saw a slight drop in support but was able to outperform opinion poll predictions of an electoral meltdown. Finally, with 3.4%, Cs fell well below their aspirations of entering parliament, failing to secure any seat.

The results of the Basque and Galician elections, both of which saw very poor PSOE's performances after being overtaken by the Podemos-led alliances and polling at record-low levels of support, prompted dissenters within the party—led by Andalusian president Susana Díaz—to call for Pedro Sánchez's resignation as PSOE secretary-general. Sánchez's refusal to resign and his announcement of a party congress for later in the year—amid an ongoing government formation process and with the growing risk of a third general election in a row being held in Spain—led to an attempt from his critics to force his downfall, triggering a severe party crisis and a breakdown of party discipline which led to Sánchez's ousting on 1 October 2016, a divided PSOE abstaining in Mariano Rajoy's investiture on 29 October and a subsequent party leadership election in 2017 which would see Sánchez returning to his post of secretary-general and taking full control over the party.

== Background ==
While the People's Party (PP) under Alberto Núñez Feijóo had been able to remain at the helm of the Xunta de Galicia following the 2012 regional election, the party struggled to maintain its electoral standing in the ensuing years as a result of the corruption scandals beleaguering the party at the national level. In the 2014 European Parliament election, the PP obtained its worst result since 1989 up until that time, securing 35.2% of the vote though remaining in first place regionally as a result of a collapse in the vote for the opposition Socialists' Party of Galicia (PSdeG–PSOE) and Galician Nationalist Bloc (BNG).

The emergence of Podemos and Citizens (C's) and the reorganization of the political space of non-Galician nationalists to the left of the PSOE, including the late Galician Left Alternative (AGE) comprising United Left (EU) and Anova, into the local "tides" (Spanish: mareas)—popular unity candidacies established at the local level to contest the 2015 local elections, such as Marea Atlántica, Compostela Aberta or Ferrol en Común, among others—brought about the PP's downfall from the local governments of the main Galician urban centres and in left-from-centre parties securing much of the local power in Galicia, with the mareas newly found popularity coming at the expense of both the PSdeG and the BNG. The establishment of the En Marea alliance between Podemos, EU and Anova would see the PP seeing off its worst electoral result in a general election on 20 December 2015, although the party would see a slight recovery in the next general election held in June 2016.

After his defeat in the 2012 election, Pachi Vázquez announced his intention to abandon the PSdeG's leadership within a year and to allow for a primary election to be held to elect his successor. The primaries were held on 7 September 2013, with José Ramón Gómez Besteiro emerging as the winner with 77% of the votes, subsequently ratified at a special party congress held on 29 September. Gómez Besteiro came under public scrutiny after being indicted on 3 July 2015 for four crimes, including influence peddling, bribery, prevarication and a crime against regional planning, allegedly committed during Besteiro's time in the local government of Lugo in 2005. On 12 March 2016, Besteiro was accused of six further crimes—new bribery, prevarication and influence peddling crimes, as well as abuse of public administrations, subsidy fraud and embezzlement of public funds—which prompted him to announce the following day his declination to be the party's leading candidate to the Xunta de Galicia in the next regional election. Mounting pressure from his party's colleagues, however, eventually led to Besteiro also resigning as party leader on 18 March. Xoaquín Fernández Leiceaga was elected on 28 May through a primary election to be Besteiro's replacement as candidate to the Xunta, while a management committee took charge of the party.

The national PSOE was also beleaguered by an internal crisis over Pedro Sánchez's leadership as a result of the party having secured its worst electoral results since the Spanish transition to democracy in the 2015 and 2016 general elections, with Sánchez himself having announced an early party congress, to be held at some point following the Basque and Galician elections, in which he would be running for re-election. The PSOE branches in both regions were widely seen as being supportive of Sánchez, prompting dissenters to frame the elections as a test on Sánchez and of the broader political mood in Spain after nine months of political impasse over the government formation process.

== Overview ==
Under the 1981 Statute of Autonomy, the Parliament of Galicia was the unicameral legislature of the homonymous autonomous community, having legislative power in devolved matters, as well as the ability to grant or withdraw confidence from a regional president. The electoral and procedural rules were supplemented by national law provisions.

=== Date ===
The term of the Parliament of Galicia expired four years after the date of its previous election, unless it was dissolved earlier. The election decree was required to be issued no later than 25 days before the scheduled expiration date of parliament and published on the following day in the Official Journal of Galicia (DOG), with election day taking place 54 days after the decree's publication. The previous election was held on 21 October 2012, which meant that the chamber's term would have expired on 21 October 2016. The election decree was required to be published in the DOG no later than 27 September 2016, setting the latest possible date for election day on 20 November 2016.

The regional president had the prerogative to dissolve the Parliament of Galicia at any given time and call a snap election, provided that it did not occur before one year after a previous one under this procedure. In the event of an investiture process failing to elect a regional president within a two-month period from the first ballot, the Parliament was to be automatically dissolved and a fresh election called.

The Parliament of Galicia was officially dissolved on 2 August 2016 with the publication of the corresponding decree in the DOG, setting election day for 25 September and scheduling for the chamber to reconvene on 21 October.

=== Electoral system ===
Voting for the Parliament was based on universal suffrage, comprising all Spanish nationals over 18 years of age, registered in Galicia and with full political rights, provided that they had not been deprived of the right to vote by a final sentence, nor were legally incapacitated. Additionally, non-resident citizens were required to apply for voting, a system known as "begged" voting (Spanish: Voto rogado).

The Parliament of Galicia had a minimum of 60 and a maximum of 80 seats, with electoral provisions fixing its size at 75. All were elected in four multi-member constituencies—corresponding to the provinces of A Coruña, Lugo, Ourense and Pontevedra, each of which was assigned an initial minimum of 10 seats and the remaining 35 distributed in proportion to population—using the D'Hondt method and closed-list proportional voting, with a five percent-threshold of valid votes (including blank ballots) in each constituency. The use of this electoral method resulted in a higher effective threshold depending on district magnitude and vote distribution.

As a result of the aforementioned allocation, each Parliament constituency was entitled the following seats:

| Seats | Constituencies |
|---|---|
| 25 | A Coruña^{(+1)} |
| 22 | Pontevedra |
| 14 | Lugo^{(−1)}, Ourense |

The law did not provide for by-elections to fill vacant seats; instead, any vacancies arising after the proclamation of candidates and during the legislative term were filled by the next candidates on the party lists or, when required, by designated substitutes.

=== Outgoing parliament ===
The table below shows the composition of the parliamentary groups in the chamber at the time of dissolution.

Parliamentary composition in August 2016
| Groups | Parties | Legislators | |
| Groups | Parties | Seats | Total |
|---|---|---|---|
| People's Parliamentary Group of Galicia | PP | 41 | 41 |
| Socialists of Galicia's Parliamentary Group | PSdeG–PSOE | 18 | 18 |
| Galician Nationalist Bloc's Parliamentary Group | BNG | 7 | 7 |
| Galician Left Alternative's Parliamentary Group | EU | 4 | 6 |
| Galician Left Alternative's Parliamentary Group | Anova | 2 | 6 |
| Mixed Parliamentary Group | Cerna | 2 | 3 |
| Mixed Parliamentary Group | INDEP | 1 (Note: Carmen Iglesias, former EU legislator.) | 3 |

== Parties and candidates ==
The electoral law allowed for parties and federations registered in the interior ministry, alliances and groupings of electors to present lists of candidates. Parties and federations intending to form an alliance were required to inform the relevant electoral commission within 10 days of the election call, whereas groupings of electors needed to secure the signature of at least one percent of the electorate in the constituencies for which they sought election, disallowing electors from signing for more than one list. Additionally, a balanced composition of men and women was required in the electoral lists, so that candidates of either sex made up at least 40 percent of the total composition.

Below is a list of the main parties and alliances which contested the election:

| Candidacy | Parties and alliances | Leading candidate | Ideology | Previous result | | Gov. | Ref. |
| Candidacy | Parties and alliances | Leading candidate | Ideology | Vote % | Seats | Gov. | Ref. |
|---|---|---|---|---|---|---|---|
| PP | List: People's Party (PP) | Alberto Núñez Feijóo | Conservatism; Christian democracy | 45.8% | 41 | Yes | |
| PSdeG– PSOE | List: Socialists' Party of Galicia (PSdeG–PSOE) | Xoaquín Fernández Leiceaga | Social democracy | 20.6% | 18 | No | |
| En Marea | List: In Tide (En Marea) – We Can (Podemos) – United Left (EU) – Renewal–Nationalist Brotherhood (Anova) – Equo Galicia (Equo) – Galician Eco-socialist Space (EcoSoGal) | Luis Villares | Galician nationalism Direct democracy Democratic socialism | 13.9% | 9 | No | |
| BNG–Nós | List: Galician Nationalist Bloc (BNG) – Galician People's Union (UPG) – Galician Movement for Socialism (MGS) – Abrente–Galician Democratic Left (Abrente–EDG); Communist Party of the Galician People (PCPG); Galician Workers' Front (FOGA) | Ana Pontón | Galician nationalism Left-wing nationalism Socialism | 10.1% | 7 | No | |
| C's | List: Citizens–Party of the Citizenry (C's) | Cristina Losada | Liberalism | Did not contest | | No | |

== Campaign ==
=== Party slogans ===
| Party or alliance | Original slogan | English translation | Ref. |
|---|---|---|---|
| PP | « En Galicia sí » | "In Galicia, yes" | |
| PSdeG–PSOE | « Unha resposta nova » | "A new response" | |
| En Marea | « Un país xusto » | "A fair country" | |
| BNG–Nós | « Construír Galiza con ilusión, Galiza contigo » | "Build Galicia with hope, Galicia with you" | |
| C's | « No nos conformemos. Galicia merécese máis » (Note: Bilingual slogan with a grammar mistake in the Galician part. It should be « Galicia merece máis ».) | "Don't conform. Galicia deserves more" | |

=== Debates ===
2016 Galician regional election debates
| Date | Organizer(s) | Moderator(s) | P Present (Note: Denotes a main invitee attending the event.) | | | | | | |
| Date | Organizer(s) | Moderator(s) | PP | PSdeG | En Marea | BNG | C's | Audience | Ref. |
|---|---|---|---|---|---|---|---|---|---|
| 12 September | TVG | Marta Darriba; Kiko Novoa | P Feijóo | P Leiceaga | P Villares | P Pontón | P Losada | 15.3% (151,000) | |

== Opinion polls ==
The tables below list opinion polling results in reverse chronological order, showing the most recent first and using the dates when the survey fieldwork was done, as opposed to the date of publication. Where the fieldwork dates are unknown, the date of publication is given instead. The highest percentage figure in each polling survey is displayed with its background shaded in the leading party's colour. If a tie ensues, this is applied to the figures with the highest percentages. The "Lead" column on the right shows the percentage-point difference between the parties with the highest percentages in a poll.

=== Voting intention estimates ===
The table below lists weighted voting intention estimates. Refusals are generally excluded from the party vote percentages, while question wording and the treatment of "don't know" responses and those not intending to vote may vary between polling organisations. When available, seat projections determined by the polling organisations are displayed below (or in place of) the percentages in a smaller font; 38 seats were required for an absolute majority in the Parliament of Galicia.

Color key:

Poll conducted after legal ban on opinion polls Exit poll

| Polling firm/Commissioner | Fieldwork date | Sample size | Turnout | PP | PSdeG–PSOE | AGE | BNG– Nós | UPyD | Podemos | C's | En Marea | Lead |
|---|---|---|---|---|---|---|---|---|---|---|---|---|
| 2016 regional election | 25 Sep 2016 | —N/a | 53.6 | 47.6; 41 | 17.9; 14 | (Note: Within En Marea.) | 8.3; 6 | – | | 3.4; 0 | 19.1; 14 | 28.5 |
| TNS Demoscopia/CRTVG | 25 Sep 2016 | 16,800 | ? | 45.5; 38/41 | 18.9; 14/16 | | 8.8; 5/6 | – | | 4.4; 0/1 | 19.5; 14/16 | 26.0 |
| Sondaxe/La Voz de Galicia | 20–23 Sep 2016 | 1,600 | ? | 45.3; 39 | 19.3; 16 | | 6.5; 2 | – | | 3.3; 0 | 21.8; 18 | 23.5 |
| GAD3/ABC | 12–23 Sep 2016 | 1,450 | ? | 46.7; 40/42 | 18.6; 14/15 | | 6.9; 2 | – | | 3.6; 1 | 20.1; 14/16 | 26.6 |
| Sondaxe/La Voz de Galicia | 15–18 Sep 2016 | 1,600 | 68.3 | 45.6; 39 | 16.9; 13 | | 5.4; 3 | – | | 3.6; 0 | 25.6; 20 | 20.0 |
| Sondaxe/La Voz de Galicia | 14–17 Sep 2016 | 1,600 | 70.6 | 43.8; 38 | 17.6; 13 | | 5.9; 4 | – | | 3.5; 1 | 25.7; 19 | 18.1 |
| Sondaxe/La Voz de Galicia | 13–16 Sep 2016 | 1,600 | ? | 42.2; 38 | 18.0; 13 | | 5.4; 3 | – | | 4.4; 1 | 26.2; 20 | 16.0 |
| Celeste-Tel/eldiario.es | 12–16 Sep 2016 | 1,200 | ? | 45.4; 38/40 | 18.5; 15/16 | | 5.2; 2 | – | | 3.7; 1 | 21.6; 17/18 | 23.8 |
| NC Report/La Razón | 9–16 Sep 2016 | 1,000 | 60.0 | 44.7; 40/41 | 18.8; 15/16 | | 5.4; 2 | – | | 3.6; 0 | 22.0; 17 | 22.7 |
| Sigma Dos/El Mundo | 12–15 Sep 2016 | 1,400 | ? | 45.7; 38/41 | 17.3; 13/14 | | 7.1; 4/6 | – | | 4.3; 0/1 | 21.7; 16/17 | 24.0 |
| Sondaxe/La Voz de Galicia | 12–15 Sep 2016 | 1,600 | ? | 42.7; 38 | 19.2; 15 | | 5.7; 4 | – | | 4.0; 0 | 24.7; 18 | 18.0 |
| Infortécnica/Atlántico | 9–15 Sep 2016 | 1,711 | ? | ? 42/48 | ? 13/16 | | ? 2/4 | – | | ? 0/1 | ? 12/15 | ? |
| GAD3/ABC | 12–14 Sep 2016 | 800 | ? | 46.6; 39/41 | 20.2; 16/17 | | 5.3; 2/3 | – | | 3.9; 0/2 | 19.5; 14/16 | 26.4 |
| Sondaxe/La Voz de Galicia | 11–14 Sep 2016 | 1,600 | ? | 41.8; 37 | 17.7; 15 | | 6.3; 4 | – | | 4.3; 0 | 25.8; 19 | 16.0 |
| Sondaxe/La Voz de Galicia | 10–13 Sep 2016 | 1,600 | ? | 42.6; 37 | 18.0; 15 | | 4.7; 1 | – | | 4.9; 2 | 25.9; 20 | 16.7 |
| Metroscopia/El País | 8–13 Sep 2016 | 2,800 | 63.8 | 46.6; 39/41 | 17.7; 13/14 | | 6.0; 3/4 | – | | 4.2; 0/2 | 21.8; 16/18 | 24.8 |
| Sondaxe/La Voz de Galicia | 9–12 Sep 2016 | 1,600 | ? | 42.9; 37 | 18.7; 15 | | 4.5; 2 | – | | 4.5; 1 | 25.9; 20 | 17.0 |
| JM&A/Público | 11 Sep 2016 | ? | 59.3 | 43.0; 38/40 | 19.0; 15 | | 5.7; 2 | – | | 3.2; 0/1 | 22.8; 18/19 | 20.2 |
| Sondaxe/La Voz de Galicia | 8–11 Sep 2016 | 1,600 | ? | 44.1; 38 | 18.0; 14 | | 4.8; 2 | – | | 4.3; 1 | 25.1; 20 | 19.0 |
| Sondaxe/La Voz de Galicia | 7–10 Sep 2016 | 1,600 | ? | 44.1; 38 | 19.5; 15 | | 5.2; 2 | – | | 3.9; 1 | 24.0; 19 | 20.1 |
| Sondaxe/La Voz de Galicia | 6–9 Sep 2016 | 1,600 | 75.3 | 44.3; 38 | 18.3; 15 | | 5.7; 2 | – | | 3.1; 1 | 25.4; 19 | 18.9 |
| Einvenio/Prensa Ibérica | 1–9 Sep 2016 | 1,400 | 65 | 43.6; 38/39 | 18.5; 15/16 | | 6.0; 2 | – | | 5.8; 2/3 | 20.1; 16/17 | 23.5 |
| Infortécnica/Atlántico | 1–8 Sep 2016 | 1,645 | ? | 55.9; 40/45 | 21.3; 15/17 | | 5.4; 3/5 | – | | 1.9; 0/1 | 15.5; 12/14 | 34.6 |
| TNS/CIS | 29 Aug–2 Sep 2016 | 3,454 | ? | 44.9; 40/41 | 19.9; 16 | | 5.3; 2 | – | | 4.6; 0/1 | 19.9; 15/17 | 25.0 |
| Sondaxe/La Voz de Galicia | 19–24 Aug 2016 | 1,600 | ? | 44.9; 37 | 18.3; 15 | | 7.4; 5 | – | | 1.6; 0 | 23.8; 18 | 21.1 |
| Infortécnica/Atlántico | 11–24 Aug 2016 | 1,704 | ? | ? 38/41 | ? 17/19 | | ? 5/6 | – | | ? 0/2 | ? 11/12 | ? |
| NC Report/La Razón | 15–20 Aug 2016 | 1,000 | 53.0 | 44.6; 39 | 19.5; 17 | | 5.3; 2 | – | | 5.2; 2 | 18.8; 15 | 25.1 |
| Sondaxe/La Voz de Galicia | 20 Jul–3 Aug 2016 | 1,450 | ? | 43.5; 37 | 17.5; 15 | | 7.4; 5 | – | | 4.1; 0 | 23.7; 18 | 19.8 |
| Sondaxe/La Voz de Galicia | 20 Jul–3 Aug 2016 | 1,450 | ? | 43.5; 37 | 17.5; 15 | | 7.4; 5 | – | 7.4; 6 | 4.1; 0 | 16.3; 12 | 26.0 |
| 2016 general election | 26 Jun 2016 | —N/a | 58.2 | 41.5 (35) | 22.2 (18) | | 2.9 (0) | 0.1 (0) | | 8.6 (6) | 22.2 (16) | 19.3 |
| GAD3/ABC | 4–6 Apr 2016 | 807 | ? | 44.1; 36/38 | 19.7; 15/17 | | 6.7; 4/5 | – | | 5.1; 2/3 | 17.9; 14/16 | 24.4 |
| Redondo & Asociados | 16 Jan 2016 | ? | ? | 37.0; 32 | 21.0; 17 | | – | – | | 9.0; 6 | 25.0; 20 | 12.0 |
| 2015 general election | 20 Dec 2015 | —N/a | 61.5 | 37.1 (32) | 21.3 (17) | | 4.3 (0) | 0.5 (0) | | 9.1 (6) | 25.0 (20) | 12.1 |
| Sondaxe/La Voz de Galicia | 17–23 Oct 2014 | 500 | 48.4 | 44.7 | 20.3 | 8.3 | 5.8 | – | 16.9 | – | – | 24.4 |
| 2014 EP election | 25 May 2014 | —N/a | 38.7 | 35.2 (35) | 21.8 (19) | 10.5 (8) | 7.9 (6) | 3.3 (0) | 8.4 (7) | 1.6 (0) | – | 13.4 |
| Sondaxe/La Voz de Galicia | 11–17 Oct 2013 | 1,600 | 50.5 | 43.5; 38 | 19.3; 16 | 16.6; 13 | 10.7; 8 | – | – | – | – | 24.2 |
| Sondaxe/La Voz de Galicia | 5–7 Feb 2013 | 1,600 | 50.4 | 42.3; 36 | 19.5; 17 | 19.2; 15 | 10.0; 7 | – | – | – | – | 22.8 |
| 2012 regional election | 21 Oct 2012 | —N/a | 54.9 | 45.8; 41 | 20.6; 18 | 13.9; 9 | 10.1; 7 | 1.5; 0 | – | – | – | 25.2 |

=== Voting preferences ===
The table below lists raw, unweighted voting preferences.

| Polling firm/Commissioner | Fieldwork date | Sample size | PP | PSdeG–PSOE | AGE | BNG– Nós | UPyD | Podemos | C's | En Marea | Question | X mark | Lead |
|---|---|---|---|---|---|---|---|---|---|---|---|---|---|
| 2016 regional election (Note: Does not include non-resident citizens.) | 25 Sep 2016 | —N/a | 30.0 | 11.3 | | 5.3 | – | | 2.1 | 12.0 | —N/a | 36.2 | 18.0 |
| GAD3/ABC | 12–14 Sep 2016 | 800 | 40.2 | 14.3 | | 4.9 | – | | 2.4 | 12.3 | – | – | 25.9 |
| TNS/CIS | 29 Aug–2 Sep 2016 | 3,454 | 30.2 | 11.7 | | 4.3 | – | | 2.2 | 16.9 | 23.3 | 4.4 | 13.3 |
| 2016 general election | 26 Jun 2016 | —N/a | 28.5 | 15.3 | | 2.0 | 0.0 | | 5.9 | 15.2 | —N/a | 30.4 | 13.2 |
| GAD3/ABC | 4–6 Apr 2016 | 807 | 32.8 | 14.4 | | 4.4 | – | | 3.5 | 13.3 | – | – | 18.4 |
| 2015 general election | 20 Dec 2015 | —N/a | 26.7 | 15.4 | | 3.1 | 0.4 | | 6.5 | 18.0 | —N/a | 27.0 | 8.7 |
| Sondaxe/La Voz de Galicia | 17–23 Oct 2014 | 500 | 17.9 | 8.3 | 3.7 | 2.1 | – | 7.4 | – | – | 31.3 | 26.4 | 9.6 |
| 2014 EP election | 25 May 2014 | —N/a | 15.6 | 9.6 | 4.7 | 3.5 | 1.5 | 3.7 | 0.7 | – | —N/a | 54.5 | 6.0 |
| 2012 regional election | 21 Oct 2012 | —N/a | 28.4 | 12.8 | 8.7 | 6.3 | 0.9 | – | – | – | —N/a | 36.2 | 15.6 |

=== Victory preferences ===
The table below lists opinion polling on the victory preferences for each party in the event of a regional election taking place.

| Polling firm/Commissioner | Fieldwork date | Sample size | PP | PSdeG–PSOE | BNG– Nós | C's | En Marea | Other/ None | Question | Lead |
|---|---|---|---|---|---|---|---|---|---|---|
| TNS/CIS | 29 Aug–2 Sep 2016 | 3,454 | 33.4 | 14.5 | 4.8 | 2.4 | 17.8 | 8.1 | 19.0 | 15.6 |

=== Victory likelihood ===
The table below lists opinion polling on the perceived likelihood of victory for each party in the event of a regional election taking place.

| Polling firm/Commissioner | Fieldwork date | Sample size | PP | PSdeG–PSOE | BNG– Nós | C's | En Marea | Other/ None | Question | Lead |
|---|---|---|---|---|---|---|---|---|---|---|
| GAD3/ABC | 12–14 Sep 2016 | 800 | 91.0 | 1.4 | – | 0.0 | 1.6 | 0.2 | 5.9 | 89.4 |
| TNS/CIS | 29 Aug–2 Sep 2016 | 3,454 | 85.1 | 1.6 | 0.2 | 0.0 | 1.9 | 1.1 | 10.1 | 83.2 |
| GAD3/ABC | 4–6 Apr 2016 | 807 | 74.7 | 6.1 | – | 0.9 | 6.0 | 1.3 | 11.0 | 68.6 |

=== Preferred President ===
The table below lists opinion polling on leader preferences to become president of the Regional Government of Galicia.

| Polling firm/Commissioner | Fieldwork date | Sample size | | | | | | Other/ None/ Not care | Question | Lead |
| Polling firm/Commissioner | Fieldwork date | Sample size | Feijóo PP | Leiceaga PSdeG | Pontón BNG | Losada C's | Villares En Marea | Other/ None/ Not care | Question | Lead |
|---|---|---|---|---|---|---|---|---|---|---|
| GAD3/ABC | 12–14 Sep 2016 | 800 | 47.1 | 10.7 | 5.7 | 0.8 | 11.5 | 12.2 | 12.1 | 35.6 |
| TNS/CIS | 29 Aug–2 Sep 2016 | 3,454 | 38.1 | 8.8 | 4.1 | 1.5 | 10.2 | 7.1 | 30.2 | 27.9 |

== Results ==
=== Overall ===
← Summary of the 25 September 2016 Parliament of Galicia election results →
| Parties and alliances | Popular vote | | | Seats | |
| Parties and alliances | Votes | % | ±pp | Total | +/− |
|---|---|---|---|---|---|
| People's Party (PP) | 682,150 | 47.56 | +1.76 | 41 | ±0 |
| In Tide (En Marea)^{1} | 273,523 | 19.07 | +5.16 | 14 | +5 |
| Socialists' Party of Galicia (PSdeG–PSOE) | 256,381 | 17.87 | −2.74 | 14 | −4 |
| Galician Nationalist Bloc–We–Galician Candidacy (BNG–Nós) | 119,446 | 8.33 | −1.78 | 6 | −1 |
| Citizens–Party of the Citizenry (C's) | 48,553 | 3.38 | New | 0 | ±0 |
| Animalist Party Against Mistreatment of Animals (PACMA) | 15,135 | 1.06 | +0.50 | 0 | ±0 |
| Ourensan Democracy (DO) | 7,723 | 0.54 | +0.25 | 0 | ±0 |
| Commitment to Galicia (CxG) | 4,109 | 0.29 | −0.72 | 0 | ±0 |
| Anti-Corruption and Justice Party (PAyJ) | 2,535 | 0.18 | New | 0 | ±0 |
| Let's Win Galicia: Yes We Can (Gañemos) | 2,344 | 0.16 | New | 0 | ±0 |
| Zero Cuts–Green Group (Recortes Cero–GV) | 2,276 | 0.16 | New | 0 | ±0 |
| Citizens–Centrum (C–C) | 1,534 | 0.11 | New | 0 | ±0 |
| Communists of Galicia (PCPE–CdG) | 1,263 | 0.09 | −0.03 | 0 | ±0 |
| Blank Seats (EB) | 1,111 | 0.08 | −1.11 | 0 | ±0 |
| Citizens of Galicia Democratic Action (ADCG) | 651 | 0.05 | New | 0 | ±0 |
| XXI Convergence (C21) | 493 | 0.03 | −0.04 | 0 | ±0 |
| Independent Alternative of Galicia (AIdG) | 367 | 0.03 | New | 0 | ±0 |
| United for the Future! (Unidos SI–DEF) | 296 | 0.02 | New | 0 | ±0 |
| Galicia New Way (VN) | 281 | 0.02 | New | 0 | ±0 |
| Libertarian Party (P–LIB) | 210 | 0.01 | New | 0 | ±0 |
| Blank ballots | 14,037 | 0.98 | −1.68 | | |
| Total | 1,434,418 | | | 75 | ±0 |
| Valid votes | 1,434,418 | 99.00 | +1.53 | | |
| Invalid votes | 14,544 | 1.00 | −1.53 | | |
| Votes cast / turnout | 1,448,962 | 53.63 | −1.28 | | |
| Abstentions | 1,252,970 | 46.37 | +1.28 | | |
| Registered voters | 2,701,932 | | | | |
Sources
Footnotes: ^{1} In Tide results are compared to Galician Left Alternative totals in the 2012 election.

Popular vote
| PP | 47.56% |
| En Marea | 19.07% |
| PSdeG–PSOE | 17.87% |
| BNG–Nós | 8.33% |
| C's | 3.38% |
| PACMA | 1.06% |
| Others | 1.76% |
| Blank ballots | 0.98% |

Seats
| PP | 54.67% |
| En Marea | 18.67% |
| PSdeG–PSOE | 18.67% |
| BNG–Nós | 8.00% |

=== Distribution by constituency ===
| Constituency | PP | | En Marea | | PSdeG | | BNG–Nós | |
| Constituency | % | S | % | S | % | S | % | S |
|---|---|---|---|---|---|---|---|---|
| A Coruña | 47.8 | 13 | 19.4 | 5 | 17.2 | 5 | 8.8 | 2 |
| Lugo | 52.8 | 8 | 15.4 | 2 | 19.1 | 3 | 7.4 | 1 |
| Ourense | 53.1 | 9 | 13.8 | 2 | 17.6 | 2 | 6.0 | 1 |
| Pontevedra | 43.3 | 11 | 22.0 | 5 | 18.4 | 4 | 9.0 | 2 |
| Total | 47.6 | 41 | 19.1 | 14 | 17.9 | 14 | 8.3 | 6 |

== Aftermath ==
=== Government formation ===
Investiture; Nomination of Alberto Núñez Feijóo (PP)
| Ballot → | 10 November 2016 |
| Required majority → | 38 out of 75 |
| Yes: • PP (41) | 41 / 75 |
| No: • En Marea (14); • PSdeG (14); • BNG (6) | 34 / 75 |
| Abstentions | 0 / 75 |
| Absentees | 0 / 75 |

== Bibliography ==
- Ley Orgánica 1/1981, de 6 de abril, de Estatuto de Autonomía para Galicia (Organic Law 1/1981). Official State Gazette (in Spanish). 6 April 1981 [version as of 17 July 2010]. BOE-A-1981-9564.
- Ley 1/1983, de 22 de febrero, reguladora de la Junta y su Presidente (Law 1/1983). Official State Gazette (in Spanish). 22 February 1983 [version as of 4 September 2015]. BOE-A-1983-23788.
- Ley Orgánica 5/1985, de 19 de junio, del Régimen Electoral General (Organic Law 5/1985). Official State Gazette (in Spanish). 19 June 1985 [version as of 31 March 2015]. BOE-A-1985-11672.
- Ley 8/1985, de 13 de agosto, de elecciones al Parlamento de Galicia (Law 8/1985). Official State Gazette (in Spanish). 13 August 1985 [version as of 31 August 2015]. BOE-A-1985-21380.
- Decreto 92/2016, de 1 de agosto, de disolución del Parlamento de Galicia y de convocatoria de elecciones (PDF) (Decree 92/2016). Official Journal of Galicia (in Spanish). 1 August 2016.
