= En Marea =

In Tide En Marea
- Founded: 6 November 2015 (alliance)
- Registered: 10 August 2016 (party)
- Dissolved: 26 September 2020
- Preceded by: Galician Left Alternative
- Headquarters: Pl. Horta de Abaixo, 5B, 4ºA; 15220, Ames
- Membership (2018): 4,877
- Ideology: Democratic socialism; Ecologism; Participatory democracy; Galician nationalism; Federalism
- Political position: Left-wing
- National affiliation: Unidos Podemos (2016–2019); Commitment to Europe (2019–2020)
- Regional affiliation: Marea Galeguista (2020)
- Colors: Blue
- Slogan: Hai marea! (Tide's up!)
- Members: See list of members

En Marea (translated in English as "In Tide") was a political party and former political alliance integrated by Podemos, Anova, United Left of Galicia, and some municipal alliances that participated in the 2015 Spanish local elections (Marea Atlántica, Compostela Aberta, and Ferrol en Común). It was formed in November 2015 as an electoral coalition to contest the 2015 Spanish general election in Galicia. As part of the coalition agreement with Podemos, the name on the ballot paper for both the 2015 and 2016 general elections was Podemos–En Marea–Anova–EU.

En Marea would receive the support of Galician Eco-socialist Space (EcoSoGal) for the 2015 general election, which was joined by Equo's support in the June 2016 election. Both parties would end up joining the confluence in the run up to the 2016 Galician regional election, ahead of which the coalition partners chose to constitute En Marea as a political party, which was officially registered as such on 10 August 2016.

In January 2019, the party saw its founding members — Podemos, Anova, and EU, as well as the local tides — splitting and eventually coalescing around the Galicia en Común alliance.

== History ==
=== Establishment ===
The success of the local "tides" (mareas) in the 2015 Spanish local elections — with Marea Atlántica, Compostela Aberta, and Ferrol en Común forming the local governments of A Coruña, Santiago de Compostela, and Ferrol — had led to a renewed interest within the left-wing political space in Galicia, specially from Podemos and Xosé Manuel Beiras's Renewal–Nationalist Brotherhood (Anova), to engage in talks ahead of a prospective "confluence" of similarly aligned parties to contest that year's general election. By the summer of 2015, the "Citizen Meeting for a Galician Tide" (Galician: Encontro Cidadán por unha Marea Galega) and the "Initiative for the Union" (Galician: Iniciativa pola Unión, IxU) platforms had been set up as meeting points for discussion between left-wing and Galician nationalist political forces, seeing the incorporation of United Left of Galicia (EU)—allied with Anova under the Galician Left Alternative umbrella—the Galician Nationalist Bloc (BNG), Commitment to Galicia (CxG), Galician Eco-socialist Space (EcoSoGal), Equo and Cerna into the talks, with the ultimate goal of creating a "Galician Tide" (Galician: Marea Galega), an electoral alliance able to secure a Galician-only parliamentary group in the Congress of Deputies.

Negotiations throughout September 2015 ensued, but stalled over Podemos's demands of its name appearing on the ballot clashing with Galician-based parties' stance to set up an autonomous candidacy "without subordinations". A pre-agreement was reached between Podemos, Anova and EU on 23 September and subsequently offered to the local tide platforms, under which the future platform was to be recognized autonomy as a "Galician political subject". Joint action between the Galician Tide and IxU platforms stopped from mid-October because of the former disagreeing with having any new party join the confluence, leading to IxU and the BNG to break away to negotiate their own electoral alliance. A final meeting on 31 October only confirmed that both platforms would go their separate ways, leading to CxG refusing contesting the general election altogether. Equo and Cerna would also drop out for different reasons: the former because of alleged "deficiencies in democratic participation", whereas the latter dropped out citing the failure in reaching an alliance with the BNG as the reason. The resulting alliance, which would comprise Podemos, Anova and EU, would be labeled as "En Marea" (English: In Tide) and officially registered on 6 November 2015. The alliance scored an election success by securing 25.0% of the share and finishing in second place ahead of the Socialists' Party of Galicia.

=== Transformation into a party ===
The failure in government formation negotiations led to a new general election being called for 26 June 2016. As en Marea had not been able to form a parliamentary group on its own due to the board of the Congress of Deputies blocking it, alleging the legal impossibility for parties "not competing each other in the election" to form separate groups, Anova attempted to have the confluence registered as an "instrumental" party for the 2016 election in order to be able to circumvent this obstacle. This was opposed by both Podemos and EU which defended the figure of the coalition instead, arguing that the problem ultimately did not lie in the electoral formula at use but on the "sensivity" of the Congress's board. An internal crisis ensued throughout the following days, with public confrontations between several leaders—such as Beiras (Anova) and Yolanda Díaz (EU)—and Anova's threat of holding a membership vote on the issue of the electoral formula despite all other En Marea members voting against it, bringing the confluence to the brink of dissolution. Ultimately, Anova and Beiras backed down to avoid fracturing En Marea, and the alliance was maintained under the same format as in the December election.

Following the 2016 general election, in which En Marea fell to third place in Galicia after losing 63,000 votes and three percentage points, discussions took place on the alliance's future ahead of the 2016 Galician regional election. In an assembly held in Vigo on 30 July, Anova, EU and the local tide platforms voted in favour of constituting En Marea as a political party to contest the regional election. This had been opposed by the regional branch of Podemos, which had concurrently held a membership vote that resulted in 75% of party members favouring the electoral alliance format instead. This led to a deadlock in negotiations, as En Marea rejected the formula of the electoral coalition whereas Podemos refused both joining into the instrumental party and its trademark not appearing on the ballot, with the possibility arising of both parties eventually confronting each other in the regional election. A last minute deal was reached on 13 August, after national Podemos leader Pablo Iglesias anticipated that his party would run together with En Marea "whatever the formula was". Subsequently, Luis Villares, a judge running as an independent, was picked and elected as En Marea's candidate for the 25 September election, in which the party scored 19.1% of the vote and attained second place regionally, but remained in opposition after being unable to prevent the People's Party of Galician president Alberto Núñez Feijóo from securing a new absolute majority in the Parliament of Galicia.

=== Crisis and breakup ===
En Marea's internal situation remained fragile throughout the tenure of the 10th Parliament. Villares's appointment as the party's sole leader and spokesperson in April 2017 had resulted in Equo dropping out of En Marea because of perceiving "defects" in the internal organization style, but also saw criticism coming from A Coruña mayor Xulio Ferreiro because of it "breaking" consensus "and excluding majority sensibilities" within the confluence, such as Ferreiro's Marea Atlántica itself, but also Anova or EU. Divisions were also evident within the parliamentary group over Villares's performance as party spokesperson and his clashing with Podemos members—who comprised about half of the group—which led to a gradual weakening of Villares's stand as leader among the parties forming En Marea. The situation was aggravated in March 2018 when a policial incident involving a regional MP, Paula Quinteiro—a member of the Anticapitalistas current within Podemos—divided En Marea members between those demanding her resignation (including Beiras and Villares) and those defending her innocence (Podemos members, but also Ferreiro and Santiago de Compostela mayor Martiño Noriega). This internal division was mirrored in subsequent party assemblies and meetings.

In late 2018, a crisis concerning the election of a new party leadership resulted in a split between Luís Villares's supporters and En Marea's founding members, Podemos, Anova and EU. Villares was re-elected as party leader on 24 December 2018 despite the latter parties' attempts to mount an alternative candidacy, but his victory came amid accusations of fraud and vote rigging, prompting Podemos, Anova and EU to withdraw from the confluence in January 2019 and dub it as a "failed" political project, while hinting at the creation of a new, separate alliance. This was materialized in the establishment of the En Común coalition ahead of the April 2019 Spanish general election. En Marea remained integrated within the Unidos Podemos's group in the Congress of Deputies until the latter's dissolution following the failed voting on the 2019 budget in March—in which Villares-aligned deputy Alexandra Fernández broke party discipline—with the parliamentary group in the Parliament of Galicia remaining united until the appointment of regional senators in June 2019, when Villares and three other deputies broke up to go into the Mixed Group.

En Marea contested the April 2019 general election, as well as the May 2019 European Parliament election within the Commitment to Europe alliance, seeing poor performances in both elections. Ahead of the November 2019 general election, it considered an alliance with either CxG, Anova and the BNG or with Íñigo Errejón's Más País, but talks were unsuccessful and it ultimately declined to run altogether. En Marea had initially dropped out from the 2020 Galician regional election race following the resignation of Villares and his farewell from politics on 19 February, but after it was suspended and rescheduled for 12 July as a result of the COVID-19 pandemic the party announced that it would be contesting it within the Marea Galeguista alliance.

== Composition ==
| Party | Notes |
|---|---|
| We Can (Podemos) | Left in January 2019. (Note: Joined En Común.) |
| Renewal–Nationalist Brotherhood (Anova) | Left in January 2019. |
| United Left (EU) | Left in January 2019. |
| Heartwood (Cerna) | Joined in July 2016, dissolved in 2018. (Note: Merged into En Marea) |
| Galician Eco-socialist Space (EcoSoGal) | Joined in July 2016, dissolved in November 2017. (Note: Merged into En Marea.) |
| Equo Galicia (Equo) | Joined in July 2016, left in April 2017. |
| Citizen Meeting for a Galician Tide (Marea Galega) | Stopped activity in February 2016. |
Local "tides" (mareas)
| New Lugo (LN) | |
| Pontevedra Tide (MaPo) | |
| Atlantic Tide (Marea) | Left in January 2019. |
| Ferrol in Common (Ferrol en Común) | Left in January 2019. |
| Ourense in Common (OUeC) | Left in January 2019. |
| Open Compostela (CA) | Left in January 2019. |
| Tide of Vigo (Marea de Vigo) | Left in January 2019. |

== Electoral performance ==
=== Parliament of Galicia ===
Parliament of Galicia
| Election | Votes | % | # | Seats | +/– | Leading candidate | Status in legislature |
| 2016 | 273,523 | 19.07% | 2nd | 14 / 75 | 5 (Note: Compared to Galician Left Alternative totals in the 2012 regional election.) | Luis Villares | Opposition |
| 2020 | Within MG | | | 0 / 75 | 14 | Pancho Casal | No seats |

=== Cortes Generales ===
Cortes Generales
| Election | Galicia | | | | | | |
| Election | Congress | | | | | Senate | |
| Election | Vote | % | Score | Seats | +/– | Seats | +/– |
| 2015 | 410,698 | 25.01% | 2nd | 6 / 23 | 6 | 2 / 16 | 2 |
| 2016 | 347,542 | 22.18% | 3rd | 5 / 23 | 1 | 1 / 16 | 1 |
| 2019 (Apr) | 17,899 | 1.09% | 7th | 0 / 23 | 5 | 0 / 16 | 1 |

=== European Parliament ===
European Parliament
| Election | Total | | | | | Galicia | | |
| Election | Votes | % | # | Seats | +/– | Votes | % | # |
| 2019 | Within CxE | | | 0 / 59 | 0 | 15,375 | 1.05% | 8th |

== Symbols ==
Campaign logo in the 2015 and 2016 general elections.

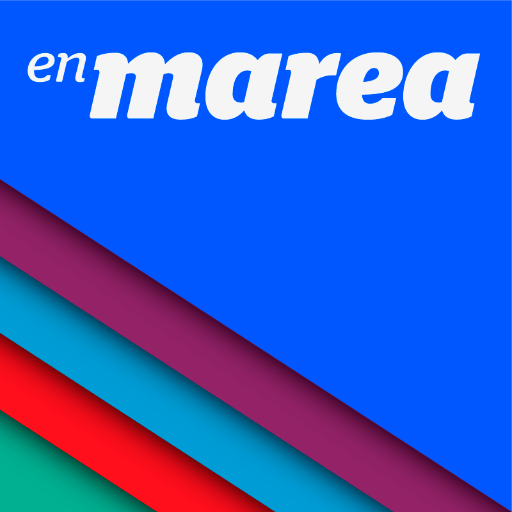
Alternative campaign logo in the 2015 and 2016 general elections.

Ballot logo in the 2015 and 2016 general elections.

Logo from November 2015 to August 2016.

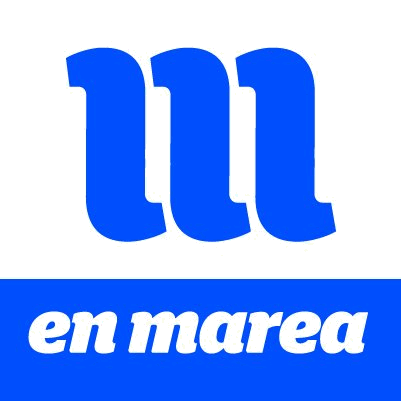
Logo from August 2016 to October 2017.

Logo from October 2017 to present.

== See also ==
- En Comú Podem
- A la valenciana
