= Encontro Irmandiño =

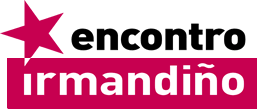
- Leader: Xosé Manuel Beiras
- Founded: 2007
- Dissolved: 2012
- Student wing: Galician Student League (LEG)
- Youth wing: Mocidade Irmandiña
- Ideology: Galician nationalism Direct democracy Alter-globalization; Feminism; Anticapitalism; Internationalism
- Political position: Left-wing
- National affiliation: Anova-Nationalist Brotherhood
- Trade union affiliation: Confederación Intersindical Galega

Website
- encontroirmandinho.org (in Galician)

Encontro Irmandiño (EI, Irmandiño Meeting in English) was a political organization that which was unified in Anova-Nationalist Brotherhood in Galicia, Spain. It used to be an internal current in the Galician Nationalist Bloc (BNG). EI was founded in 2007 and has an ideology based in Galician nationalism, direct democracy, anticapitalism, feminism and alter-globalization.

== History ==
Encontro Irmandiño was founded as an internal current of the BNG on 21 July 2007 at a meeting in Santiago de Compostela. Led by Xosé Manuel Beiras, EI advocated for a return to the founding principles of BNG, as assembly-based internal democracy and communication between the different levels of the organization. Encontro Irmadiño abandoned the BNG in 2012.

On 14 March 2012 the Encontro Irmandiño announced that it had begun to contact other small formations towards the creation of a common electoral platform, among which would be Máis Galiza, Nationalist Left, Espazo Ecosocialista Galego, New Galician Left, Galician People's Front (FPG), Communist Party of the Galician People (PCPG), Movemento pola Base (MpB), Causa Galiza, Galician Workers Front, Marín Nationalist Collective and a small section of the Galician Socialist Party of Vigo. This platform would have the temporary name of New Common Project, and would lead to new political party: Anova-Nationalist Brotherhood.
