= Commitment to Galicia =

Commitment to Galicia Compromiso por Galicia
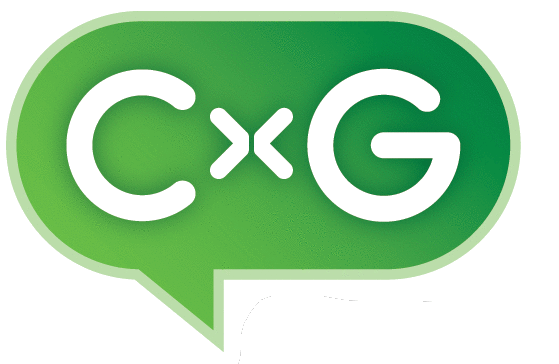
- Abbreviation: CxG
- Spokesperson: Juan Carlos Piñeiro
- Founded: 2012
- Headquarters: c/ Rúa dos Concheiros, 27 - 2º dereita; Santiago de Compostela
- Youth wing: Galician Nationalist Youth
- Membership (2019): 400
- Ideology: Progressivism; Galician nationalism Europeanism; Republicanism; Until 2019: Social democracy
- Political position: Centre to centre-left
- European affiliation: European Democratic Party
- Colors: Green
- Congress of Deputies: 0 / 350
- Spanish Senate: 0 / 266
- European Parliament: 0 / 61
- Mayors: 1 / 313
- Town councillors: 21 / 3,721

Website
- compromiso.gal

Commitment to Galicia (Spanish: Compromiso por Galicia, CxG) is a Galician political party with a Galician nationalist, progressive ideology.

== Ideology ==
CxG proposed to reform the Galician electoral law to create a single Galician constituency, in both the autonomic and general elections, the implementation of open lists as well as open government and promoting citizenship participation by the ILPs, the removal of the provinces and the limitation of mandates of the elected officials.

CxG considers Galicia as a "nation in terms society and culture". Unlike other Galician nationalist organizations, CxG does not want independence or total sovereignty for Galicia, but a multinational and republican Spain. The party also accepts capitalism, but defends a strong welfare state and social democratic public policies. The party is also pro-European.

== History ==
The party was formed in December 2012, in its first National Congress. The previous organizations were partially dissolved, not allowing the new organization double militancy.

The party was formed after the rupture of Máis Galiza with the Galician Nationalist Bloc. Máis Galiza had contacts with other Galician nationalist forces like Encontro Irmandiño or Espazo Ecosocialista Galego in order to form a new Galician nationalist organization, alternative to the Galician Nationalist Bloc. In May 2012 Máis Galiza announced the creation of Compromiso por Galicia, along with Espazo Ecosocialista Galego. The Galician Nationalist Party-Galicianist Party (PNG-PG) also joined the project. The historical Galician Coalition (CG) was also interested, having attended their leaders to acts of the new organización. On 21 June 2012 CxG announced the incorporation of a sector of the collective Unity of the Galician Left, a splinter group of the Socialists' Party of Galicia based mainly in Vigo, including the Socialist ex-deputy Miguel Barros.

Encontro Irmandiño, also a split from the BNG, and led the Xosé Manuel Beiras, also showed willingness to come together in a common organization, but suggested that the project had to be created from base assemblies, and not from agreements between the leaders of the organizations. At the meetings of the Encontro Irmandiño, that allowed free participation, there were some tensions with the militants of the Galician People's Front (FPG) and Causa Galiza, anticapitalist and pro-independence organizations. This process culminated in the creation of two differentiated project: Compromiso por Galicia and Anova-Nationalist Brotherhood.

In the 2012 elections to the Parliament of Galicia, CxG presented its own list, despite having announced plans to present a "technical coalition" with Anova-Nationalist Brotherhood, United Left and Equo. Meanwhile, Espazo Ecosocialista Galego left the party in September 2012, to join the Galician Left Alternative coalition. After the elections, in which CxG only gained 14,459 votes (1.01%), Terra Galega, which was incorporated in August, left the party to form its own Galician centrist and Galician nationalist political party.

In the European Parliament elections of 2014 CxG formed a coalition with Convergence and Union, the Basque Nationalist Party and Canarian Coalition, known as Coalition for Europe. In Galicia Coalition for Europe won 9,812 votes (0.96%).

In the local elections of 2015 the party presented 40 lists (out of 314 municipalities in Galicia) and participated in a coalition. CxG also supported 18 independent lists in other municipalities. Finally CxG-CCTT gained 41 town councillors and the mayors of Lalín, Miño, Muros and Vilar de Santos. The election of the mayor of Miño was very polemic because the list of CxG in that municipality was the least voted in the 2015 election, but the People's Party decided to vote for the candidate of CxG to avoid the candidate of the Spanish Socialist Workers' Party (PSOE) getting elected.

In 2017 Juan Carlos Piñeiro was elected as the new secretary-general of CxG.

In December 2019, the party joined the European Democratic Party.

== Electoral results ==
Election	Votes	%	Leader	Seats
2012 Galician parliamentary election	14,586	1.01	Xoán Bascuas	0 / 75
European Parliament election, 2014	9,812	0.96	Xoán Bascuas	0 / 56
2015 Spanish local elections	17,592	1.19	Xoán Bascuas	41 / 3,766
2016 Galician parliamentary election	4,109	0.29	Xoán Bascuas	0 / 75
2019 Spanish local elections	7,183	0.48	Juan Piñeiro	21 / 3,721
