= Francisco Jorquera =

Galician politician (born 1961)

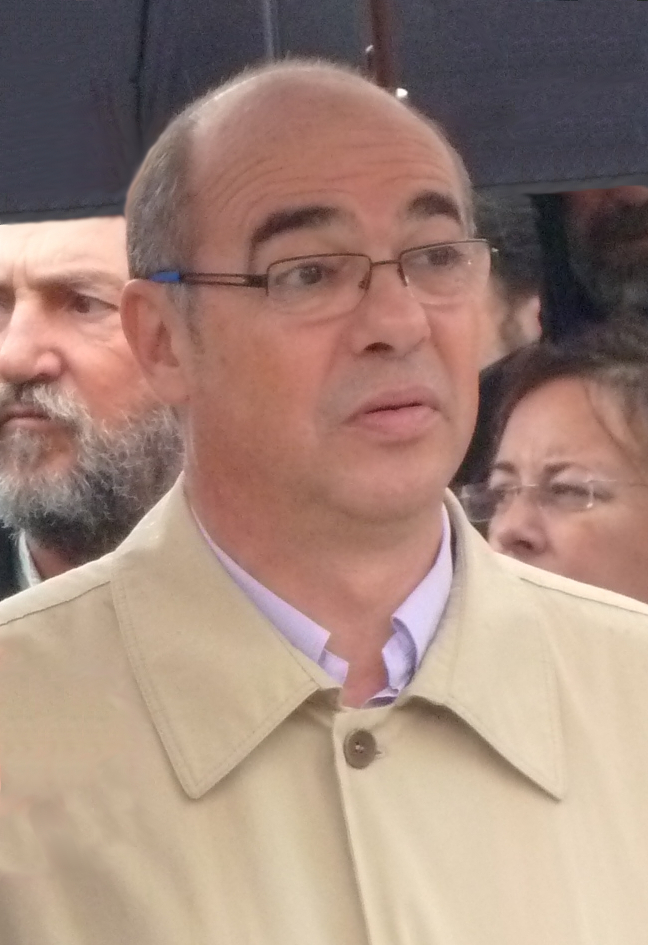

Francisco Xesús Jorquera Caselas (Note: In this Spanish name, the first or paternal surname is Jorquera and the second or maternal family name is Caselas.) (born 31 August 1961) is a Spanish politician of the Galician Nationalist Bloc (BNG). He was a Senator (2005–08) and a member of the Congress of Deputies (2008–2012), and led his party in the Parliament of Galicia from 2012 to 2016. In 2019, he was elected to the city council in A Coruña.

== Biography ==
Born in Ferrol, Jorquera graduated in Geography and History from the University of Santiago de Compostela. While there, he was the secretary general of the Galician Revolutionary Students (ERGA) and a member of the Galician National-Popular Assembly (ANPG), before partaking in the foundation of the Galician Nationalist Bloc (BNG) in 1982. He was a member of the party's national council in the early 1980s and again from 2001, joining its executive in 2003.

Jorquera was a member of the Senate of Spain from 2005 to 2008, being appointed by the Parliament of Galicia and the only BNG member in the upper house of the Cortes Generales. In 2008, he was elected to the Congress of Deputies to represent A Coruña, and was re-elected in 2011.

In January 2012, Jorquera was chosen as the BNG's lead candidate for the 2012 Galician regional election. The results in October saw his party come fourth, falling by five seats to seven. In 2016, shortly before the next election, he ceded his responsibilities to the next candidate, Ana Pontón.

Jorquera was chosen in June 2018 as the BNG's leader for the 2019 local election in A Coruña. His party rose from one councillor to two, and voted for Inés Rey of the Socialist Party of Galicia (PSdeG) to be mayor. Four years later, he led the BNG list again, and the party grew to four seats. They again voted for Rey as mayor after reaching an agreement, but not a coalition government.

On 11 March 2026, Jorquera announced that he would not be the BNG's candidate for mayor in 2027. He considered that he would be too old at 66, and wanted to spend more time with his family.
