= Luis Villares =

Spanish jurist

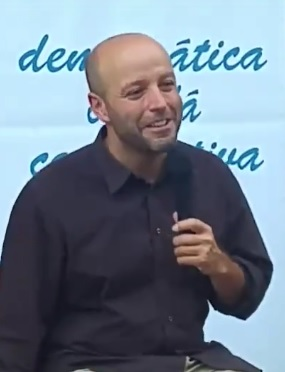

Personal details
- Born: Luis Villares Naveira; 8 August 1978 (age 47) Lugo, Galicia, Spain
- Party: En Marea
- Profession: Jurist

Luis Villares Naveira (born 8 August 1978 in Lugo, Spain) is a Spanish jurist and En Marea candidate for President of the Xunta of Galicia in the 2016 Galician parliamentary election.
