= Renewal–Nationalist Brotherhood =

Renewal–Nationalist Brotherhood Anova–Irmandade Nacionalista
- Spokesperson: Antón Sánchez
- Founded: 2012
- Merger of: Encontro Irmandiño; Galician People's Front; Movemento pola Base; Galician Left Unity; Galician Workers' Front (left in 2014) independents
- Headquarters: Santiago de Compostela
- Youth wing: Mocidade de Anova and Xeira
- Membership (2019): ▼250
- Ideology: Galician nationalism; Galician independence; Socialism; Anti-capitalism; Left-wing nationalism; Republicanism; Anti-globalization; Internationalism
- Political position: Left-wing
- National affiliation: Galician Left Alternative (2012–2016); En Marea (2016–2019); Galicia en Común (2019–2023); Galician Nationalist Bloc (2024-present)
- European Parliament group: European United Left–Nordic Green Left
- Trade union affiliation: Confederación Intersindical Galega (CIG) and Central Unitaria de Traballadores
- Colors: Light blue
- Congress of Deputies: 0 / 23
- Spanish Senate: 0 / 19
- European Parliament: 0 / 54
- Parliament of Galicia: 0 / 75
- Mayors in Galicia (Note: The mayor of Sada (elected on the Sadamaioría list) and the mayor of Teo (elected in the Son de Teo-Anova list).): 2 / 313

Website
- www.anova.gal

Renewal–Nationalist Brotherhood (Galician: ANOVA–Irmandade Nacionalista, Anova) is a political party in Galicia. Formed in 2012, under the guidance of historical leader Xosé Manuel Beiras, Anova was formed by Encontro Irmandiño (2012 split of the BNG), the FPG, Movemento pola Base (small 2009 split of the BNG), the Galician Workers Front (2012 split of the BNG), and independents. Anova defines itself as a Galician nationalist, socialist, feminist, ecologist, internationalist organization and advocates for Galician independence. Its internal organization is run by assemblies.

== History ==
=== Origins ===
Shortly after the split of several sectors of the Galician Nationalist Bloc (BNG) after its XIII National Assembly, the more important being Máis Galiza and Encontro Irmandiño (EI), Several confluence processes began, with the "New Common Project" (NPC) being the most important one. However, the majority sector of Máis Galiza abandoned this process, seeking to create a more centrist political force and questioning the leadership of EI in the NPC. Other parties and organizations also joined the NPC, including the Galician People's Front (FPG), Movemento pola Base (MPB), Galician Workers Front (FOGA) and Causa Galiza (this last organization left, criticizing the control exercised by EI in the project).

Finally, in July 2012, the First National Assembly of the NPC was held in Santiago de Compostela, creating a new party with the name ANOVA-Irmandade Nacionalista, led by a "National Council" of 75 members. The assembly also decided the political bases of the new party, that include ecologism, republicanism and Galician independence. The organization included various historical figures of Galician nationalism like Xosé Manuel Beiras (ex-leader of the BNG), Martiño Noriega (then mayor of Teo, currently mayor of Santiago de Compostela), Mariano Abalo Costa (then leader of the FPG and ex-mayor of Cangas), Mario López Rico, Lidia Senra Rodríguez (ex-leader of the Sindicato Labrego Galego), David Fernández Calviño (the mayor of Manzaneda) or Luís Eyré Diéguez (ex-leader of the Socialist Collective).

Later that year, Unity of the Galician Left, a small party formed by ex-members of the Socialists' Party of Galicia (PSdeG-PSOE), that had previously joined Compromiso por Galicia (CxG) left this organization and also joined Anova-IN.

Anova-IN was formally registered as a political party on February 11, 2013, using AINA as legal acronym.

=== 2012 Galician elections ===
To contest the 2012 Galician parliamentary election, Anova decided to form a coalition with the United Left, Equo, and the Espazo Ecosocialista Galego. The coalition was called Galician Left Alternative; it won 9 seats (5 United Left, 4 Anova), becoming the third-largest party in the Galician Parliament, displacing the Galician Nationalist Bloc, and coming second in most of the major cities of Galicia.

=== Internal crisis ===
In 2013 Unity of the Galician Left and New Socialist Left merged and created New Galician Left, as a new internal current within Anova. In 2014 a critical political organization within the party, called CERNA, was created. CERNA left the party after the results of the second National Assembly of Anova. The same year, FOGA left Anova.

=== 2014 European elections ===
Anova participated in the Plural Left–Galician Left Alternative list, along with United Left and other smaller parties. 1 member of Anova, Lidia Senra Rodríguez, was elected to the European Parliament.

=== 2015 Municipal elections ===
Anova supported multiple left-wing unity lists all over Galiza in the municipal elections of 2015. In some municipalities the party run alone, although with the legal coverage of the Son political party. This "instrumental" party was used by Anova and United Left to gain seats in the provincial deputations, that are elected indirectly, based on the results of the local elections. The unity lists won in various municipalities, including the cities of A Coruña and Santiago de Compostela. In this last city Martiño Noriega, a member of Anova, was elected as the mayor. Other four members of Anova were elected mayors: Rafael Sisto Edreira in Teo, Benito Portela Fernández in Sada, Antonio Negreira Noya in Val do Dubra and David Rodríguez Estévez in Manzaneda.

== See also ==
- Galician nationalism
- Xosé Manuel Beiras
- Parliament of Galicia
- Xunta de Galicia
