= New Galician Left =

New Galician Left Nova Esquerda Galega
- Spokespersons: Óscar Álvarez Lomba and Lois Pérez Leira
- Founded: 2013
- Merger of: New Socialist Left and Galician Left Unity
- Headquarters: Santiago de Compostela
- Union affiliation: Confederación Intersindical Galega
- Ideology: Galician nationalism Socialism; Confederalism; Ecologism
- Political position: Left-wing

Website
- avozdanovaesquerda.org

New Galician Left (NEG, Nova Esquerda Galega in Galician language) is a Galician left-wing political organization.

== History ==
NEG was formed in 2013 by former members of Galician Left Unity (UEG) and the entire membership of New Socialist Left (NES). Both groups had been part of Anova-Nationalist Brotherhood since its foundation. This organization, formed through the merger of the two small parties, was also joined by about twenty ex-members of the Galician Socialist Party (PSdeG).

Currently the party is in a relationship of ongoing collaboration with organizations like Open Left (Izab), Convergence for Extremadura (CEX), Ezker Batua-Berdeak (EB-B), Compromís, Plural Space and Socialist Left Initiative (ISI) and is part of the left-wing coalition La Izquierda, that advocates the creation, for the future elections, of a left front that could break the two-party system in Spain.

Óscar Álvarez Lomba and Lois Pérez Leira are the two spokespersons of the party.
