= Galician Left Alternative =

Galician Left Alternative Alternativa Galega de Esquerda
- Abbreviation: AGE
- Leader: Xosé Manuel Beiras; Yolanda Díaz
- Founded: 11 September 2012
- Dissolved: 2 August 2016
- Succeeded by: En Marea
- Ideology: Socialism; Anti-capitalism; Galicianism; Feminism; Ecologism
- Political position: Left-wing
- European Parliament group: European United Left–Nordic Green Left
- Colors: Blue; Red; Green
- Members: See list of members

Website
- www.age.gal

The Galician Alternative of the Left (Galician: Alternativa Galega de Esquerda, AGE) was an electoral alliance of left-wing independentist and federalist political parties in Galicia, Spain.

== History ==
It was formed in early 2012, following a schism within the Galician Nationalist Bloc, to contest the 2012 Galician parliamentary election, in which it won nine seats, becoming the third party by size in the Galician Parliament, displacing the Galician Nationalist Bloc, and coming second in most of the major cities of Galicia.

The constituent parties of the coalition are: Renewal–Nationalist Brotherhood, the Galician affiliates of United Left and Equo, and Espazo Ecosocialista Galego.

In the 2014 European Parliament elections the coalition obtained 10.52% of the votes in Galicia (106,189 votes). The coalition won 11.65% in A Coruña province, 11.44% in Pontevedra province, 8.18% in Lugo province and 6.83% in Ourense province.

== Composition ==
Party
Renewal–Nationalist Brotherhood (Anova)
United Left (EU)
Equo Galicia (Equo)
Galician Ecosocialist Space (EcoSoGal)

== Electoral performance ==
=== Parliament of Galicia ===
Parliament of Galicia
Election	Votes	%	#	Seats	+/–	Leading candidate	Status in legislature
2012	200,828	13.91%	3rd	9 / 75	9	Xosé Manuel Beiras	Opposition

=== European Parliament ===
European Parliament
Election	Total					Galicia		
Election	Votes	%	#	Seats	+/–	Votes	%	#
2014	Within IP			1 / 54	1	107,095	10.50%	3rd
