= Cerna (political organization) =

- Spokesperson: Paula Verao; Luís Eyré
- Founded: 2014
- Dissolved: 2018
- Merged into: En Marea
- Membership (2014): 276
- Ideology: Galician nationalism Direct democracy Galician independence Alter-globalization; Feminism; Anticapitalism; Internationalism
- Political position: Left-wing
- Regional affiliation: En Marea (2016–2018)
- Trade union affiliation: Confederación Intersindical Galega
- Galician Parliament: 0 / 75

Website
- cerna.org (in Galician)

Cerna (Heartwood in English) was a Galician political party founded in 2014 and had an ideology based in Galician nationalism, direct democracy, anticapitalism, feminism and alter-globalization. It was created to organize the critical sector of Anova-Nationalist Brotherhood that focuses on highlighting the nationalist and assembly-based character of the party. In 2018, the party was integrated within En Marea.

== History ==
At the 2014 National Assembly of Anova, CERNA was allocated only 3 seats in the party's National Council. The 3 elected representatives resigned, and CERNA conducted an internal referendum to decide if they should leave Anova-Nationalist Brotherhood and form a separate party. Finally, the organization decided to leave ANOVA, with 75% of its members supporting the split. The turnout comprised 73% of the organization's activists (201 of 276).
