= Galician Workers' Front =

Galician Workers' Front Fronte Obreira Galega
- President: Xosé Carlos de la Fuente Estévez
- National Spokesperson: Segundo González
- Founded: 2010
- Headquarters: Vigo
- Union affiliation: Confederación Intersindical Galega
- Ideology: Galician nationalism Socialism; Workerism; Galician independence
- Political position: Left-wing
- National affiliation: Galician Nationalist Bloc (2010–12; 2017–present); None (2014–15); Renewal–Nationalist Brotherhood (2012–14)

Website
- foga.gal

Galician Workers' Front (FOGA, Fronte Obreira Galega in Galician language) is a Galician political organization. It was formed in 2010 by militants of the trade union world, mainly of the Confederación Intersindical Galega (CIG). The organization was integrated in the Galician Nationalist Bloc (BNG) until 2012, when the FOGA abandoned the BNG and was one of the three parties that formed Renewal–Nationalist Brotherhood.

== History ==
FOGA had an MP in the Galician Parliament, Chelo Martínez, between 2012 and 2014. Its top leaders are Miguel Anxo Malvido, its national coordinator, and Tino Álvarez, the national spokesperson. in 2014 Chelo Martínez left FOGA and joined Cerna.

FOGA left Anova in 2014. Since then, FOGA has become closer to the Galician Nationalist Bloc (BNG) again

FOGA supported We–Galician Candidacy in the 2015 Spanish general election. In the 2016 Spanish general election FOGA supported the BNG again. in January 2017 FOGA rejoined the BNG.
