= Máis Galiza =

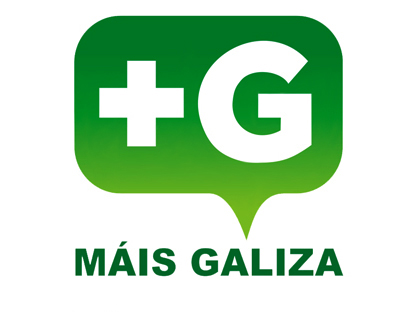
- Secretary-General: Xoán Bascuas
- Founded: 2009^{1} March 11, 2012^{2}
- Split from: Galician Nationalist Bloc
- Youth wing: Galician Nationalist Youth
- Ideology: Galician nationalism Social democracy
- Political position: Centre-left
- National affiliation: Compromiso por Galicia

Website
- http://www.maisgaliza.org
- Politics of Galicia; Political parties^{1}As an internal division within the BNG^{2}Split from the BNG

Máis Galiza (styled as +Galiza and +G) is a Galician political party which split from the Galician Nationalist Bloc.
