= Xosé Manuel Beiras =

Galician politician and economist (1936–2026)

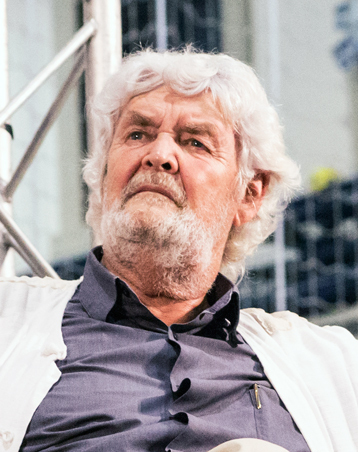
- Beiras in 2015

Member of the Parliament of Galicia
- In office 13 November 2012 – 21 October 2016
- Constituency: A Coruña
- In office 24 November 1985 – 19 June 2005
- Constituency: A Coruña

Personal details
- Born: Xosé Manuel Hixinio Beiras Torrado; 7 April 1936 Santiago de Compostela, Galicia, Spain
- Died: 8 October 2026 (aged 90) Brión, Galicia, Spain
- Party: Galician Socialist Party (1963–1977); Galician Nationalist Bloc (1982–2012); Encontro Irmandiño (2007–2026); Renewal–Nationalist Brotherhood (2012–2026)
- Spouse: Aurichu Pereira (died 2023)
- Relations: Rodrigo Paz Pereira (nephew-in-law)
- Education: University of Santiago de Compostela
- Profession: Economist

Xosé Manuel Hixinio Beiras Torrado (7 April 1936 – 8 October 2026) was a Galician politician, economist, writer and intellectual. He was a professor of Structural Economy at the Faculty of Economic Sciences of the University of Santiago de Compostela. Beiras was a member of the National Council of the Galician Nationalist Bloc (BNG), and the leader of Renewal–Nationalist Brotherhood, an independentist political party until his death. He also served as a member of the Galician parliament.

== Academic life ==
Beiras graduated with a law degree in 1957 from the University of Santiago de Compostela. That same year, he moved to Paris to study economics at the University of the Sorbonne, where he also studied French language and literature. In 1960, he taught his first course on political economy at the Complutense University of Madrid and a year later, in 1961, he moved to London to attend the London School of Economics, where he continued to advance his studies.

During the 1966/1967 academic year, Beiras received a scholarship from the Juan March Foundation, which allowed him to attend a research course with François Perroux at the Institut de science économique appliquée (now Institut de sciences mathématiques et économiques appliquées) in Paris. During his time in France, he became acquainted with Robèrt Lafont's concept of "internal colonialism", a concept that would remain embedded in his political discourse for years to come.

He was the vice-director of the Revista de Economia da Galiza ("Galician Journal of Economics") from 1963 to 1968. In 1967, he was granted a prize from Casa Galiza in New York City for his book O problema do desenrolo na Galiza rural (The Problem of Development in Rural Galicia). In 1968 he moved back to Galicia for good, taking up a job as a lecturer in economy at the University of Santiago de Compostela. In 1970, while spending a few months in Madrid, he published his doctoral dissertation under the title Estructura y problemas de la poblacion gallega ("Structure and Problems of the Galician Population"). His dissertation earned him an Extraordinary Doctoral Prize, as well as a position as associate professor in structural economy.

In 1972 he published one of his key works, O atraso económico da Galiza ("The Economic Underdevelopment of Galicia"), and was offered the post of temporary dean, which he accepted in 1975. While still publishing books, he directed a research project on the modernization of Galician agriculture sponsored by the Pedro Barrié de la Maza foundation and the University of Montpellier. In 1977 he was invited to join the Royal Galician Academy, which he left in 1982 due to disagreements with the academy's linguistic policies (following the example of Ricardo Carballo). In 1980 Beiras became head professor of structural economy at the University of Santiago de Compostela. In the 1980s, he published prolifically, literary works as well as economics and politics, including translations of French classics into Galician.

== Life in politics ==
As a politician he was one of the founding members of the clandestine Galician Socialist Party, in 1963, in Francoist Spain. In 1964 he took on the role of International Relations, a position which would grant him access to a number of European Socialist organizations. He would eventually become Secretary General of the party in 1971. Yet, he resigned in 1977 due to the unfavorable results in the first democratic elections of Spain after the death of Franco.

In 1982 Beiras took part in the foundation of the BNG (Galician Nationalist Bloc) as member of the National Directive Board. In 1985 he gained a seat at the Galician Parliament and gradually became the indisputable leader of Galician nationalism. Beiras took the party to its best results ever in 1997, receiving the support of almost 25 per cent of the electorate. In 2004 he established a number of pacts with nationalist parties from Catalonia and Basque Country in order to gain greater media coverage and, most importantly, joint political weight in the Spanish Parliament. That same year, 2004, he decided to renounce his candidacy for the Galician presidency for the next election and gradually leave politics. However, being unhappy with the internal dynamics of BNG shortly after he yielded leadership, he fostered a critical organization within it – the Encontro Irmandinho – in order to promote party transparency and internal democracy.

After abandoning the first line of BNG, Beiras was actively involved in anti-globalization movements such as Altermundo and the World Social Forum (WSF). In 2008 he was invited to join the council of the WSF. Beiras was also a co-founder of the politically oriented foundation Galiza Sempre, and its president since 1999.

== Death ==
Beiras died on 8 October 2026, at the age of 90.

== Writing ==
Beiras published a large number of books and articles in politics and economics, but as an intellectual he also showed an interest in literature and music. He contributed to the creation of publishing houses Editorial Galaxia and Edicións Laiovento. He was a regular columnist of the newspaper Galicia Hoxe. Occasionally he published his works in the newspaper A Nosa Terra and in the prestigious Galician cultural journal Grial.

=== Selected works ===
- Antígona (translation into Galician of Jean Anouilh's Antigone, with Xosé Luís Franco Grande), 1959
- O problema do desenrolo na Galiza rural, 1967
- Introducción á economía galega de hoxe (Beiras et al.), 1969
- Estructura y problemas de la población gallega, 1970
- O atraso económico de Galiza, 1972
- A Galiza rural na encrucillada, 1975
- Contaminación industrial e desenvolvimento, 1975
- O atraso e Nós. Aportación para un debate encol o atraso económico, 1982
- Dende Galiza: Marx. Homenaxe a Marx no 1º centenario da súa morte (Beiras et al.), 1984
- Por unha Galiza liberada, 1984
- Constitución española e nacionalismo galego: unha visión socialista, 1985
- Cartas a un amigo alemán (translation into Galician of Albert Camus' Lettres à un ami allemand), 1987
- Os xustos (translation into Galician of Albert Camus' Les Justes), 1987
- Prosas de combate e maldicer, 1991
- O estado da nación, 1996
- A poboación galega no século XX (with A. López Rodríguez), 1999

== See also ==
- Galician nationalism
- Galician Nationalist Bloc

== Sources ==
- Beramendi, J. and Núñez Seixas, X.M. (1996): O nacionalismo galego, A Nosa Terra, Vigo
- Fernández Baz, M.A., (2003): A formación do nacionalismo galego contemporáneo (1963–1984), Laiovento
- Fernán Vello, M.A. and Pillado Maior, F. (2004): A estrela na palabra. Novas conversas con Xosé Manuel Beiras, Edicións Laiovento – Espiral Maior, Santiago de Compostela
- Rodríguez Polo, X. R. (2009): Ramón Piñeiro e a estratexia do galeguismo. Xerais, Vigo.
