= Espazo Ecosocialista Galego =

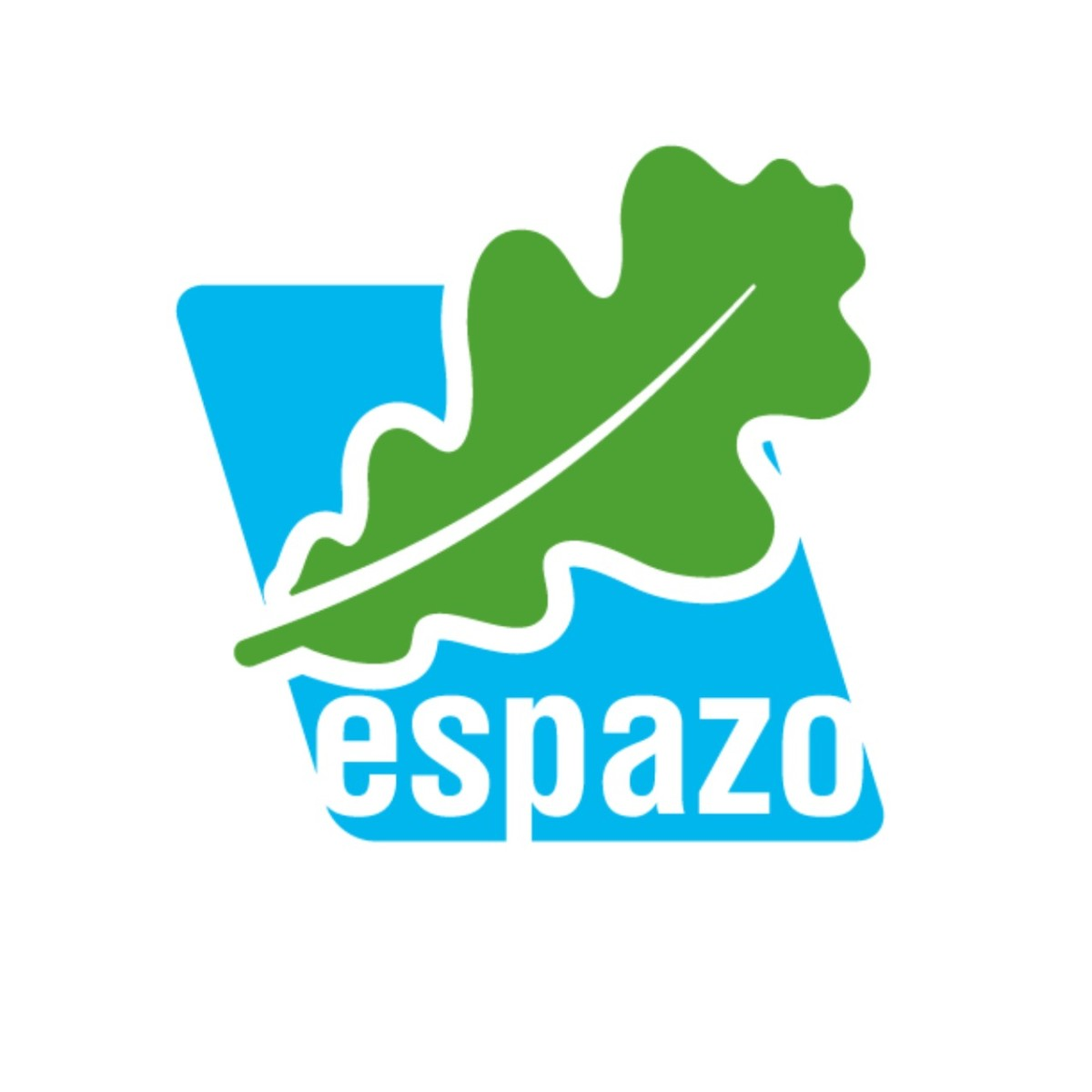
- Spokesperson: Xoán Hermida
- Founded: 2012
- Dissolved: 2017
- Headquarters: Santiago de Compostela
- Ideology: Galician nationalism Eco-socialism; Direct democracy Feminism; Alter-globalization
- Political position: Left-wing
- Town Councillors in Santiago de Compostela: 2 / 25

Website
- espazoecosocialista.org

Espazo Ecosocialista Galego (EcoSoGal, Galician Eco-socialist Space), also known as Ecogaleguistas, was a Galician political party which was formed on 26 May 2012 after a process of confluence of Galician left-wing militants mostly from various social movements and the Galician Nationalist Bloc (BNG). Ideologically they define themselves as eco-socialists. Their leader is Xoán Hermida González, former coordinator of the Left of Galicia party in the Parliament of Galicia.

== History ==
Its origin is in the Ben Común initiative, which brought together people of Galician nationalist left, and people inspired by the demands of the 15-M. Ecogaleguistas maintains close relations with Initiative for Catalonia Greens, Alternatiba, Iniciativa del Poble Valencià and IniciativaVerds.

Between May and September 2012 the party was one of the founding formations of Compromiso por Galicia (CxG), but after failing to reach an agreement and coalition between CxG and Anova-Nationalist Brotherhood, Espazo Ecosocialista decided to leave CxG and integrated in the Galician Left Alternative coalition, created by Anova-Nationalist Brotherhood, United Left and Equo.
