= Opinion polling for the 2015 Spanish local elections (Galicia) =

In the run up to the 2015 Spanish local elections, various organisations carried out opinion polling to gauge voting intention in local entities in Spain. Results of such polls for municipalities in Galicia are displayed in this article. The date range for these opinion polls is from the previous local elections, held on 22 May 2011, to the day the next elections were held, on 24 May 2015.

Polls are listed in reverse chronological order, showing the most recent first and using the dates when the survey fieldwork was done, as opposed to the date of publication. Where the fieldwork dates are unknown, the date of publication is given instead. The highest percentage figure in each polling survey is displayed with its background shaded in the leading party's colour. If a tie ensues, this is applied to the figures with the highest percentages. The "Lead" columns on the right shows the percentage-point difference between the parties with the highest percentages in a given poll.

== Municipalities ==
=== A Coruña ===
Color key:

Poll conducted after legal ban on opinion polls Exit poll

Polling firm/Commissioner	Fieldwork date	Sample size	Turnout	PP	PSdeG–PSOE	BNG	AGE	UC	UPyD	Podemos	C's	Marea Atlántica	Lead
2015 municipal election	24 May 2015	—N/a	60.1	30.9; 10	18.3; 6	5.7; 1	(Note: Within Marea Atlántica.)	3.8; 0	0.6; 0		4.9; 0	30.9; 10	0.0
TNS Demoscopia/RTVE–FORTA	24 May 2015	?	?	? 8/10	? 5/6	? 1/2		–	–		? 2/3	? 8/10	Tie
Sondaxe/La Voz de Galicia	19–22 May 2015	?	?	? 12	? 5	? 2		–	–		? 0	? 8	?
GAD3/ABC	17 May 2015	?	?	? 12/13	? 4/5	? 2		–	–		? 2	? 6/7	?
Universidade da Coruña	30 Mar–17 May 2015	1,400	?	37.0; 10/12	19.0; 5/6	7.0; 1/2		–	–		9.0; 2	21.0; 5/7	16.0
Sondaxe/La Voz de Galicia	13–16 May 2015	300	63.1	37.8; 12	15.4; 5	8.6; 2		–	–		5.6; 1	24.4; 7	13.4
Sondaxe/La Voz de Galicia	9–15 May 2015	525	63.2	38.4; 12	14.3; 4	7.4; 2		–	–		7.6; 2	24.8; 7	13.6
Sondaxe/La Voz de Galicia	11–14 May 2015	300	60.5	38.8; 12	13.4; 4	7.4; 2		–	–		5.5; 1	28.1; 8	10.7
Sondaxe/La Voz de Galicia	10–13 May 2015	300	60.4	39.1; 12	16.8; 5	6.5; 2		–	–		5.7; 1	24.6; 7	14.5
Ipsos/La Opinión A Coruña	29 Apr–13 May 2015	?	?	39.7; 12/13	18.6; 5/6	6.2; 1/2		4.4; 0	–		7.9; 2/3	15.6; 5	21.1
Sondaxe/La Voz de Galicia	9–12 May 2015	300	61.2	37.6; 12	18.8; 6	5.9; 1		–	–		7.3; 2	21.6; 6	16.0
Sondaxe/La Voz de Galicia	8–11 May 2015	300	59.3	40.4; 13	20.7; 6	4.8; 0		–	–		7.4; 2	20.4; 6	19.7
Sondaxe/La Voz de Galicia	7–10 May 2015	300	59.7	41.0; 13	20.7; 6	4.8; 0		–	–		8.8; 2	19.3; 6	20.3
Sondaxe/La Voz de Galicia	6–9 May 2015	300	?	41.3; 13	20.8; 6	5.5; 1		–	–		5.7; 1	20.8; 6	20.5
Sondaxe/La Voz de Galicia	2–8 May 2015	525	?	43.3; 13	22.4; 7	5.4; 1		–	–		5.4; 1	18.5; 5	20.9
Universidade da Coruña	30 Mar–10 May 2015	1,200	?	38.0; 10/12	19.0; 5/6	5.0; 1		–	–		13.0; 3/4	18.0; 5/6	19.0
Calidonia Hibernia/Marea	9 May 2015	?	?	31.0; 9	19.0; 5	7.0; 2		–	–		14.0; 4	24.0; 7	7.0
Universidade da Coruña	30 Mar–3 May 2015	1,000	?	37.0; 10/12	20.0; 5/6	5.0; 1/2		–	–		11.0; 2/3	19.0; 5/6	17.0
Universidade da Coruña	30 Mar–26 Apr 2015	800	?	37.0; 10/12	20.0; 5/6	6.0; 1/2		–	–		10.0; 2/3	20.0; 5/6	17.0
Sondaxe/La Voz de Galicia	15–24 Apr 2015	401	57.8	40.5; 13	20.3; 6	5.8; 1		1.2; 0	2.6; 0		13.5; 4	9.3; 3	20.2
Universidade da Coruña	30 Mar–19 Apr 2015	600	?	38.0; 11	21.0; 6	7.0; 2		–	–		8.0; 2	20.0; 6	17.0
Universidade da Coruña	30 Mar–12 Apr 2015	400	?	35.0; 10	21.0; 6	7.0; 2		4.0; 1	1.0; 0		11.0; 3	19.0; 5	14.0
Sondaxe/La Voz de Galicia	3–19 Nov 2014	400	?	39.0; 12	21.0; 6	7.0; 2	5.4; 1	–	–	19.5; 6	–	–	18.0
Llorente & Cuenca	31 Oct 2014	?	?	? 10/11	? 6/7	? 2/3	? 2/3	–	? 0/1	? 4/5	–	–	?
MyWord/PSOE	13 Mar 2014	800	?	? 13	? 8	? 3	? 3	–	–	–	–	–	?
2011 municipal election	22 May 2011	—N/a	59.2	43.6; 14	26.7; 8	12.1; 4	6.0 (Note: Results for EU.); 1	3.9; 0	0.9; 0	–	–	–	16.9

=== Carballo ===
Polling firm/Commissioner	Fieldwork date	Sample size	Turnout	BNG	PP	TeGa	PSdeG–PSOE	Podemos	CxG	Lead
2015 municipal election	24 May 2015	—N/a	62.4	47.0; 11	23.4; 5	14.2; 3	10.5; 2	–	1.4; 0	23.6
Sondaxe/La Voz de Galicia	16 May 2015	?	?	54.9; 12	22.9; 5	12.8; 3	6.7; 1	–	–	32.0
Sondaxe/La Voz de Galicia	15–24 Apr 2015	300	63.9	47.6; 12	24.9; 6	11.5; 2	7.7; 1	–	–	22.7
Sondaxe/BNG	23–26 Mar 2015	300	62.6	49.2; 12	25.4; 6	7.8; 1	12.1; 2	–	0.6; 0	23.8
Sondaxe/La Voz de Galicia	3–19 Nov 2014	400	?	48.3; 11	28.4; 6	10.0; 2	6.3; 1	5.7; 1	–	19.9
2011 municipal election	22 May 2011	—N/a	69.3	44.1; 10	34.2; 8	11.1; 2	8.5; 1	–	–	9.9

=== Ferrol ===
Color key:

Poll conducted after legal ban on opinion polls Exit poll

Polling firm/Commissioner	Fieldwork date	Sample size	Turnout	PP	PSdeG–PSOE	AGE	BNG	IF	Podemos	C's	FeC	MA	Lead
2015 municipal election	24 May 2015	—N/a	56.7	36.2; 11	18.3; 5	(Note: Within FeC.)	7.5; 2	–		5.6; 1	22.0; 6	5.0; 0	14.2
TNS Demoscopia/RTVE–FORTA	24 May 2015	?	?	? 9/11	? 4/5		? 2/3	–		? 1/2	? 5/6	? 0/1	?
Sondaxe/La Voz de Galicia	19–22 May 2015	?	?	? 13	? 6		? 1	–		? 1	? 4	? 0	?
Sondaxe/La Voz de Galicia	13–16 May 2015	300	59.8	44.3; 13	16.6; 5		6.1; 1	–		6.0; 1	15.2; 4	5.9; 1	27.7
Sondaxe/La Voz de Galicia	9–15 May 2015	525	59.6	47.3; 13	17.1; 5		5.0; 1	–		9.0; 2	14.9; 4	–	30.2
Sondaxe/La Voz de Galicia	11–14 May 2015	300	59.2	47.2; 14	16.2; 5		4.7; 0	–		8.1; 2	15.3; 4	–	31.0
Sondaxe/La Voz de Galicia	10–13 May 2015	300	55.5	48.2; 14	16.7; 5		4.1; 0	–		9.7; 2	13.4; 4	–	31.5
Sondaxe/La Voz de Galicia	9–12 May 2015	300	56.4	48.6; 14	16.4; 5		3.9; 0	–		9.8; 2	15.1; 4	–	32.2
Sondaxe/La Voz de Galicia	8–11 May 2015	300	55.9	49.6; 14	17.2; 5		4.8; 0	–		6.7; 2	14.7; 4	–	32.4
Sondaxe/La Voz de Galicia	7–10 May 2015	300	56.5	51.0; 14	17.2; 5		5.1; 1	–		5.3; 1	14.2; 4	–	33.8
Sondaxe/La Voz de Galicia	6–9 May 2015	300	?	51.0; 14	17.6; 5		5.2; 1	–		5.1; 1	13.9; 4	–	33.4
Sondaxe/La Voz de Galicia	15–24 Apr 2015	402	57.1	40.5; 12	16.6; 5		5.5; 1	–		8.9; 2	19.8; 5	2.8; 0	20.7
Sondaxe/La Voz de Galicia	3–19 Nov 2014	400	?	38.7; 11	18.3; 5	8.1; 2	6.1; 1	–	20.1; 6	–	–	–	18.6
2011 municipal election	22 May 2011	—N/a	57.1	43.7; 13	24.2; 7	9.2; 2	8.5; 2	5.3; 1	–	–	–	–	19.5

=== Lalín ===
Polling firm/Commissioner	Fieldwork date	Sample size	Turnout	PP	PSdeG–PSOE	BNG	PGD	Podemos	CxG	APAC	Lead
2015 municipal election	24 May 2015	—N/a	73.5	44.7; 10	14.5; 3	5.3; 1	2.4; 0	–	25.3; 6	6.5; 1	19.4
Sondaxe/La Voz de Galicia	16 May 2015	?	?	58.9; 14	13.3; 3	6.6; 1	–	–	11.8; 2	6.4; 1	45.6
Sondaxe/La Voz de Galicia	15–24 Apr 2015	301	56.3	59.9; 15	14.5; 3	7.0; 1	1.5; 0	–	9.5; 2	4.0; 0	45.4
IGECS/PP	15–20 Dec 2014	365	?	54.3; 13/14	12.4; 3	7.7; 1/2	–	7.9; 1/2	6.1; 1	–	41.9
Sondaxe/La Voz de Galicia	3–19 Nov 2014	400	?	57.6; 14	15.6; 4	7.8; 1	8.2; 1	6.0; 1	–	–	42.0
ECO360	27 Oct–14 Nov 2014	350	?	47.7; 11/12	13.1; 2/3	5.5; 1	–	–	22.4; 5/6	–	25.3
2011 municipal election	22 May 2011	—N/a	72.7	63.8; 14	18.3; 4	9.0; 2	6.5; 1	–	–	–	45.5

=== Lugo ===
Color key:

Poll conducted after legal ban on opinion polls Exit poll

Polling firm/Commissioner	Fieldwork date	Sample size	Turnout	PP	PSdeG–PSOE	BNG	ACE	Podemos	C's	LN	Lead
2015 municipal election	24 May 2015	—N/a	60.9	32.0; 9	29.5; 8	8.7; 2	5.0; 1	(Note: Within LN.)	7.4; 2	11.4; 3	2.5
TNS Demoscopia/RTVE–FORTA	24 May 2015	?	?	? 10/12	? 7/8	? 1/2	? 0/1		? 1/2	? 3/4	?
Sondaxe/La Voz de Galicia	19–22 May 2015	?	?	? 11	? 10	? 1	–		? 1	? 2	?
Sondaxe/La Voz de Galicia	13–16 May 2015	300	62.6	38.1; 11	34.9; 10	6.5; 1	5.4; 1		5.0; 1	5.1; 1	3.2
Sondaxe/La Voz de Galicia	9–15 May 2015	525	60.3	34.2; 10	36.5; 10	7.1; 2	–		6.5; 1	7.0; 2	2.3
Sondaxe/La Voz de Galicia	11–14 May 2015	300	62.1	32.6; 9	34.8; 10	7.9; 2	–		8.0; 2	7.5; 2	2.2
Sondaxe/La Voz de Galicia	10–13 May 2015	300	57.4	31.2; 9	38.2; 11	6.7; 2	–		9.4; 2	6.5; 1	7.0
Sondaxe/La Voz de Galicia	9–12 May 2015	300	56.9	30.8; 9	36.9; 10	8.5; 2	–		9.6; 2	8.9; 2	6.1
Sondaxe/La Voz de Galicia	8–11 May 2015	300	55.6	32.0; 9	38.5; 10	7.5; 2	–		7.2; 2	10.3; 2	6.5
Sondaxe/La Voz de Galicia	7–10 May 2015	300	57.4	32.6; 9	37.2; 10	8.2; 2	–		7.8; 2	8.7; 2	4.6
Sondaxe/La Voz de Galicia	6–9 May 2015	300	?	35.0; 10	34.3; 9	8.8; 2	–		9.3; 2	7.4; 2	0.7
Sondaxe/La Voz de Galicia	15–24 Apr 2015	400	58.8	37.1; 11	36.8; 11	5.1; 1	4.0; 0		6.0; 1	5.8; 1	0.3
Sondaxe/La Voz de Galicia	3–19 Nov 2014	400	?	37.2; 10	30.9; 9	6.9; 2	–	15.6; 4	–	–	6.3
2011 municipal election	22 May 2011	—N/a	66.8	44.2; 12	38.4; 11	9.0; 3	3.2; 2	–	–	–	5.8

=== Monforte de Lemos ===
Polling firm/Commissioner	Fieldwork date	Sample size	Turnout	BNG	PP	PSdeG–PSOE	esperta	Lead
2015 municipal election	24 May 2015	—N/a	65.9	28.3; 5	28.1; 5	32.6; 6	7.3; 1	4.3
Sondaxe/La Voz de Galicia	16 May 2015	?	?	30.7; 6	31.1; 6	25.6; 5	–	0.4
Sondaxe/La Voz de Galicia	15–24 Apr 2015	301	62.5	32.6; 6	34.2; 7	23.8; 4	2.9; 0	1.6
Sondaxe/La Voz de Galicia	3–19 Nov 2014	400	?	29.3; 5	35.0; 7	23.3; 4	6.0; 1	5.7
2011 municipal election	22 May 2011	—N/a	70.6	38.0; 7	35.8; 6	24.2; 4	–	2.2

=== Narón ===
Polling firm/Commissioner	Fieldwork date	Sample size	Turnout	TeGa	PP	BNG	PSdeG–PSOE	CG	EU	ENE	C's	Lead
2015 municipal election	24 May 2015	—N/a	52.3	38.5; 10	21.9; 5	8.1; 2	8.9; 2	4.3; 0	6.1; 1	5.3; 1	4.7; 0	16.6
Sondaxe/La Voz de Galicia	16 May 2015	?	?	48.7; 13	24.2; 6	7.1; 1	7.3; 1	–	–	–	–	24.5
Sondaxe/La Voz de Galicia	15–24 Apr 2015	303	50.9	36.1; 9	30.1; 8	8.9; 2	7.9; 2	3.9; 0	2.7; 0	0.7; 0	4.3; 0	6.0
Sondaxe/La Voz de Galicia	3–19 Nov 2014	400	?	39.8; 9	21.1; 6	9.3; 2	5.4; 1	–	5.2; 1	11.8; 2	–	18.7
2011 municipal election	22 May 2011	—N/a	53.9	33.6; 8	32.3; 8	10.9; 2	9.0; 2	6.4; 1	3.2; 0	–	–	1.3

=== Ourense ===
Color key:

Poll conducted after legal ban on opinion polls Exit poll

Polling firm/Commissioner	Fieldwork date	Sample size	Turnout	PP	PSdeG–PSOE	BNG	DO	AGE	Anova	Podemos	C's	OUeC	CxG	Lead
2015 municipal election	24 May 2015	—N/a	62.1	30.8; 10	19.0; 6	4.6; 0	25.5; 8	(Note: Within OUeC.)	2.8; 0		–	10.3; 0	2.6; 0	5.3
TNS Demoscopia/RTVE–FORTA	24 May 2015	?	?	? 8/10	? 6/7	? 1/2	? 6/7		–		–	? 2/3	–	?
Sondaxe/La Voz de Galicia	19–22 May 2015	?	?	? 12	? 7	? 1	? 4		? 1		–	? 2	–	?
Sondaxe/La Voz de Galicia	13–16 May 2015	300	58.1	38.5; 12	21.7; 7	7.3; 2	13.8; 4		–		–	8.7; 2	–	16.8
Sondaxe/La Voz de Galicia	9–15 May 2015	525	58.1	38.8; 12	24.9; 8	6.3; 2	12.3; 3		–		–	9.4; 2	–	13.9
Infortécnica/La Región (Note: Undecided and/or abstentionists excluded.)	11–14 May 2015	544	?	35.8; 10/12	31.6; 9/10	6.7; 2/3	13.7; 3/4		2.8; 0/2		–	2.8; 0/2	–	4.2
Sondaxe/La Voz de Galicia	11–14 May 2015	300	53.6	40.3; 12	27.6; 8	6.7; 2	10.0; 3		–		–	8.5; 2	–	12.7
Sondaxe/La Voz de Galicia	10–13 May 2015	300	56.3	40.8; 13	26.5; 8	5.5; 1	9.3; 3		–		–	8.6; 2	–	14.3
Sondaxe/La Voz de Galicia	9–12 May 2015	300	57.6	40.0; 12	24.7; 8	5.3; 1	12.0; 3		–		–	9.9; 3	–	15.3
Sondaxe/La Voz de Galicia	8–11 May 2015	300	59.9	41.1; 12	22.3; 7	6.4; 1	13.2; 4		–		–	10.4; 3	–	18.8
Sondaxe/La Voz de Galicia	7–10 May 2015	300	62.5	40.4; 12	23.0; 7	5.3; 1	13.7; 4		–		–	10.5; 3	–	17.4
Sondaxe/La Voz de Galicia	6–9 May 2015	300	?	39.9; 12	23.8; 7	5.8; 1	15.6; 4		–		–	9.4; 3	–	16.1
Sondaxe/La Voz de Galicia	2–8 May 2015	525	?	37.4; 11	23.7; 7	7.2; 2	15.6; 4		–		–	10.1; 3	–	13.7
Infortécnica/La Región	26 Apr 2015	551	?	31.2; 9/11	32.5; 8/10	12.0; 2/3	9.4; 2/3		5.2; 0/2		–	10.2; 0/3	–	1.3
Sondaxe/La Voz de Galicia	15–24 Apr 2015	401	56.4	36.9; 12	27.9; 9	9.6; 3	11.9; 3		0.6; 0		–	3.9; 0	1.2; 0	9.0
Brais Iglesias	1–11 Apr 2015	193	?	28.3; 8/9	21.7; 6/7	7.4; 2	19.3; 5/6		–		3.5; 0	13.0; 3/4	–	6.6
Sondaxe/La Voz de Galicia	3–19 Nov 2014	400	?	32.0; 10	21.4; 6	6.4; 2	17.3; 5	–	–	14.6; 4	–	–	–	10.6
2011 municipal election	22 May 2011	—N/a	66.3	37.8; 11	36.7; 11	10.8; 3	7.9; 2	1.9; 0	–	–	–	–	–	1.1

=== Pontevedra ===
Color key:

Poll conducted after legal ban on opinion polls Exit poll

Polling firm/Commissioner	Fieldwork date	Sample size	Turnout	PP	BNG	PSdeG–PSOE	AGE	Podemos	C's	MaPo	TpP	Lead
2015 municipal election	24 May 2015	—N/a	60.3	27.1; 7	43.1; 12	10.8; 3	(Note: Within MaPo.)		5.7; 1	8.1; 2	1.8; 0	16.0
TNS Demoscopia/RTVE–FORTA	24 May 2015	?	?	? 8/9	? 11/13	? 2/3			? 0/1	? 1/2	–	?
Sondaxe/La Voz de Galicia	19–22 May 2015	?	?	? 9	? 11	? 3			? 1	? 1	–	?
Sondaxe/La Voz de Galicia	13–16 May 2015	300	67.4	33.7; 9	42.1; 12	5.9; 1			7.4; 2	5.0; 1	–	8.4
Sondaxe/La Voz de Galicia	9–15 May 2015	525	68.4	32.6; 9	44.2; 13	8.2; 2			6.5; 1	–	–	11.6
Sondaxe/La Voz de Galicia	11–14 May 2015	300	70.9	34.2; 10	42.4; 12	7.3; 2			6.2; 1	3.4; 0	–	8.2
Sondaxe/La Voz de Galicia	10–13 May 2015	300	69.4	33.1; 9	43.3; 13	8.1; 2			5.1; 1	4.4; 0	–	10.2
Sondaxe/La Voz de Galicia	9–12 May 2015	300	69.5	32.3; 9	43.0; 12	9.2; 2			5.5; 1	5.1; 1	–	10.7
Sondaxe/La Voz de Galicia	8–11 May 2015	300	70.9	30.9; 9	43.1; 12	8.4; 2			6.4; 1	5.5; 1	–	12.2
Sondaxe/La Voz de Galicia	7–10 May 2015	300	71.3	31.2; 9	43.0; 12	9.7; 2			6.6; 1	5.2; 1	–	11.8
Sondaxe/La Voz de Galicia	6–9 May 2015	300	?	30.9; 9	41.2; 12	10.1; 2			6.8; 1	5.1; 1	–	10.3
Sondaxe/La Voz de Galicia	2–8 May 2015	525	?	30.5; 9	43.5; 12	8.4; 2			6.4; 1	5.0; 1	–	13.0
PP	27 Apr 2015	?	?	? 11	? 11	? 3	–	–	–	–	–	Tie
Sondaxe/La Voz de Galicia	15–24 Apr 2015	405	63.6	31.8; 9	45.2; 13	9.5; 2			5.2; 1	3.2; 0	1.0; 0	13.4
Sondaxe/La Voz de Galicia	3–19 Nov 2014	400	?	32.2; 9	48.3; 13	8.2; 2	–	5.1; 1	–	–	–	16.1
2011 municipal election	22 May 2011	—N/a	67.4	39.5; 11	39.3; 11	13.3; 3	1.6; 0	–	–	–	–	0.2

=== Ribeira ===
Polling firm/Commissioner	Fieldwork date	Sample size	Turnout	PP	BNG	PSdeG–PSOE	IPR	Podemos	C's	Lead
2015 municipal election	24 May 2015	—N/a	59.1	41.0; 9	17.4; 4	17.1; 3	9.9; 2	–	12.8; 3	23.6
Sondaxe/La Voz de Galicia	16 May 2015	?	58.9	49.7; 12	19.2; 4	13.9; 3	10.1; 2	–	–	30.5
Sondaxe/La Voz de Galicia	15–24 Apr 2015	301	61.2	50.8; 12	16.7; 4	15.1; 3	7.6; 1	–	6.1; 1	34.1
Sondaxe/La Voz de Galicia	3–19 Nov 2014	400	?	46.0; 11	11.7; 2	14.0; 3	–	20.6; 5	–	25.4
2011 municipal election	22 May 2011	—N/a	63.4	57.2; 13	16.8; 4	15.9; 3	8.1; 1	–	–	40.4

=== Santiago de Compostela ===
Color key:

Poll conducted after legal ban on opinion polls Exit poll

Polling firm/Commissioner	Fieldwork date	Sample size	Turnout	PP	PSdeG–PSOE	BNG	AGE	UPyD	Podemos	C's	Compostela Aberta	CxG	Lead
2015 municipal election	24 May 2015	—N/a	62.3	33.5; 9	14.6; 4	6.9; 2	(Note: Within CA.)	–		4.8; 0	34.7; 10	2.4; 0	1.2
TNS Demoscopia/RTVE–FORTA	24 May 2015	?	?	? 8/10	? 3/4	? 1/2		–		? 1/2	? 8/10	–	Tie
Sondaxe/La Voz de Galicia	19–22 May 2015	?	?	? 11	? 4	? 1		–		? 0	? 9	–	?
Sondaxe/La Voz de Galicia	13–16 May 2015	300	60.5	38.6; 11	14.9; 4	6.2; 1		–		–	31.6; 9	–	7.0
Sondaxe/La Voz de Galicia	9–15 May 2015	525	59.8	38.2; 11	15.8; 4	7.0; 2		–		4.5; 0	28.8; 8	–	9.4
Sondaxe/La Voz de Galicia	11–14 May 2015	300	60.3	35.6; 10	15.1; 4	7.1; 2		–		6.2; 1	29.6; 8	–	6.0
Sondaxe/La Voz de Galicia	10–13 May 2015	300	61.2	35.6; 10	17.6; 5	7.3; 2		–		5.7; 1	27.8; 7	–	7.8
Sondaxe/La Voz de Galicia	9–12 May 2015	300	61.8	36.1; 10	16.9; 5	5.9; 1		–		6.3; 1	30.2; 8	–	5.9
Sondaxe/La Voz de Galicia	8–11 May 2015	300	60.4	37.8; 10	17.3; 5	5.8; 1		–		6.1; 1	28.1; 8	–	9.7
Anova Multiconsulting	7–11 May 2015	600	?	39.8; 11/12	16.7; 5	6.6; 1/2		–		6.0; 1	23.2; 6	–	16.6
Sondaxe/La Voz de Galicia	7–10 May 2015	300	58.4	40.4; 11	17.8; 5	5.5; 1		–		5.0; 1	26.4; 7	–	14.0
Sondaxe/La Voz de Galicia	6–9 May 2015	300	?	39.7; 11	16.7; 5	6.5; 1		–		5.0; 1	25.7; 7	–	14.0
Sondaxe/La Voz de Galicia	2–8 May 2015	525	?	39.1; 11	17.2; 5	6.6; 1		–		6.5; 1	24.3; 7	–	14.8
Sondaxe/La Voz de Galicia	15–24 Apr 2015	406	58.4	37.6; 11	17.2; 5	8.9; 2		–		6.3; 1	23.6; 6	0.5; 0	14.0
CIS	23 Mar–19 Apr 2015	499	?	33.4; 9/10	23.2; 6/7	8.6; 2		2.3; 0		7.9; 2	19.8; 5	–	10.2
Calidonia Hibernia/CA	9 Apr 2015	?	?	34.2	20.1	8.0				4.3	27.0	–	7.2
Sondaxe/La Voz de Galicia	3–19 Nov 2014	400	?	36.1; 10	20.7; 6	10.3; 3	7.4; 2	–	15.6; 4	–	–	–	15.4
2011 municipal election	22 May 2011	—N/a	62.4	43.3; 13	31.0; 9	13.3; 3	4.0; 0	2.0; 0	–	–	–	–	12.3

=== Vigo ===
Color key:

Poll conducted after legal ban on opinion polls Exit poll

Polling firm/Commissioner	Fieldwork date	Sample size	Turnout	PP	PSdeG–PSOE	BNG	AGE	UPyD	Podemos	C's	Marea de Vigo	GV	Lead
2015 municipal election	24 May 2015	—N/a	60.1	20.5; 7	51.8; 17	4.8; 0	(Note: Within MdeV.)	0.5; 0		3.4; 0	11.5; 3	1.7; 0	31.3
TNS Demoscopia/RTVE–FORTA	24 May 2015	?	?	? 6/7	? 14/16	? 0/1		–		? 1/2	? 3/4	–	?
Sondaxe/La Voz de Galicia	19–22 May 2015	?	?	? 9	? 14	? 1		–		? 0	? 3	–	?
Sondaxe/La Voz de Galicia	13–16 May 2015	300	65.2	29.5; 9	45.7; 13	7.3; 2		–		5.3; 1	8.7; 2	–	16.2
Sondaxe/La Voz de Galicia	9–15 May 2015	525	65.2	27.8; 8	46.5; 14	6.3; 1		–		6.3; 2	8.3; 2	–	18.7
Infortécnica/Atlántico	11–14 May 2015	453	?	20.6; 7/9	62.9; 14/16	3.1; 0/2	–	–	–	7.1; 2/3	–	–	42.3
Sondaxe/La Voz de Galicia	11–14 May 2015	300	62.8	27.4; 8	48.5; 14	6.4; 1		–		6.9; 2	6.7; 2	–	21.1
Sondaxe/La Voz de Galicia	10–13 May 2015	300	66.3	28.6; 8	47.4; 14	5.2; 1		–		6.7; 2	7.6; 2	–	18.8
Sondaxe/La Voz de Galicia	9–12 May 2015	300	65.2	27.9; 9	46.0; 14	6.0; 1		–		5.8; 1	9.0; 2	–	18.1
Sondaxe/La Voz de Galicia	8–11 May 2015	300	63.7	28.9; 9	45.9; 14	6.3; 2		–		2.7; 9	8.5; 2	–	17.0
Sondaxe/La Voz de Galicia	7–10 May 2015	300	65.0	28.6; 8	44.8; 14	6.9; 2		–		2.1; 0	10.5; 3	–	16.2
Sondaxe/La Voz de Galicia	6–9 May 2015	300	?	28.5; 9	45.6; 14	6.0; 1		–		5.4; 1	9.0; 2	–	17.1
Sondaxe/La Voz de Galicia	2–8 May 2015	525	?	28.5; 9	46.3; 14	5.0; 1		–		5.2; 1	8.4; 2	–	17.8
Sondaxe/La Voz de Galicia	15–24 Apr 2015	400	68.0	26.3; 8	43.2; 14	5.0; 1		–		11.6; 3	5.5; 3	1.8; 0	16.9
Sondaxe/La Voz de Galicia	3–19 Nov 2014	400	?	28.8; 8	41.7; 13	6.6; 2	–	–	13.4; 4	–	–	–	12.9
Llorente & Cuenca	31 Oct 2014	?	?	? 8/9	? 7/8	? 3/4	? 1/2	? 0/1	? 4/5	–	–	–	?
PP	24 Apr 2014	?	?	? 12/13	? 10/12	? 1	? 2/3	–	–	–	–	–	?
2011 municipal election	22 May 2011	—N/a	62.4	42.4; 13	34.4; 11	11.3; 3	4.5; 0	1.2; 0	–	–	–	–	8.0

=== Vilagarcía de Arousa ===
Polling firm/Commissioner	Fieldwork date	Sample size	Turnout	PP	PSdeG–PSOE	BNG	EU	IVIL	Podemos	PDDdG	Lead
2015 municipal election	24 May 2015	—N/a	60.9	29.4; 7	34.2; 8	9.2; 2	15.5; 3	–	–	8.2; 1	4.8
Sondaxe/La Voz de Galicia	16 May 2015	?	?	34.7; 8	33.2; 8	11.5; 2	12.2; 3	–	–	–	1.5
Sondaxe/La Voz de Galicia	15–24 Apr 2015	304	?	38.9; 9	30.1; 7	5.4; 1	15.8; 3	–	–	5.4; 1	8.8
Sondaxe/La Voz de Galicia	15–24 Apr 2015	304	56.1	38.0; 9	27.2; 7	4.7; 2	15.4; 3	–	5.4; 1	5.1; 1	10.8
Sondaxe/La Voz de Galicia	3–19 Nov 2014	400	?	36.2; 8	23.3; 5	8.6; 2	8.3; 2	–	19.2; 4	–	12.9
2011 municipal election	22 May 2011	—N/a	64.2	42.1; 10	24.2; 5	13.5; 3	9.9; 2	6.5; 1	–	–	17.9

=== Viveiro ===
Polling firm/Commissioner	Fieldwork date	Sample size	Turnout	PP	PSdeG–PSOE	BNG	iVi	Podemos	Son	Lead
2015 municipal election	24 May 2015	—N/a	67.1	27.0; 5	45.6; 8	16.2; 3	–	–	6.4; 1	18.6
Sondaxe/La Voz de Galicia	16 May 2015	?	?	26.5; 5	50.0; 9	15.4; 3	–	–	–	23.5
Sondaxe/La Voz de Galicia	15–24 Apr 2015	304	63.6	25.5; 5	48.5; 9	14.9; 3	–	–	1.6; 0	23.0
Sondaxe/La Voz de Galicia	3–19 Nov 2014	400	?	28.8; 6	33.2; 6	13.1; 2	12.2; 2	8.4; 1	–	4.4
2011 municipal election	22 May 2011	—N/a	75.5	35.9; 6	31.4; 6	16.7; 3	14.2; 2	–	–	4.5
