= Ferrol en Común =

- Abbreviation: FeC
- Leader: Jorge Suárez
- Founded: 2015
- Merger of: Anova-Nationalist Brotherhood; United Left; Podemos; Independents
- Ideology: Participative democracy Galicianism
- Political position: Left-wing
- National affiliation: SON
- Ferrol City Council: 3 / 25

Website
- ferrolencomun.gal

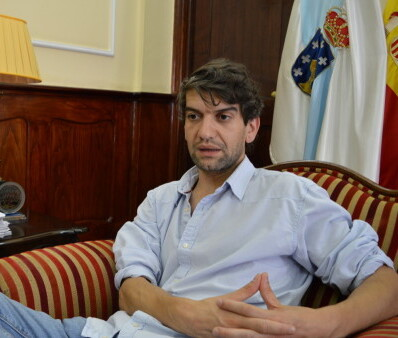
Jorge Suárez, mayor of Ferrol between 2015 and 2019

Ferrol en Común ('Ferrol in Common' or 'Ferrol Together', FeC) is a grassroots movement and political coalition in the city of Ferrol, Galicia whose goal is to build a left-wing and participative political electoral alliance. FeC is supported by political parties like Anova-Nationalist Brotherhood (Anova-IN), United Left (EU) and the local circle of Podemos in the city of Ferrol.

== History ==
Jorge Suárez, a member of United Left, was elected as the candidate for the 2015 local elections. FeC was the second most voted party in said elections (7,142 votes, 21.98%), winning 6 seats in the city council. Suárez was elected as mayor, with the votes of FeC, the Socialists' Party of Galicia (PSdeG-PSOE) and the Galician Nationalist Bloc (BNG).

In the 2019 local elections FeC won only 3 councillors and lost the mayorship of the city to Ángel Mato (PSdeG-PSOE).

=== Councillors (2019-2023) ===
- Jorge Juan Suárez Fernández: Law graduate and civil servant. Member of United Left of Galicia and mayor of the city from 2015 to 2019.
- Xiana López Penedo: Worker of the Psychiatry Service in the Public Healthcare System of Galicia. Member of both Anova-IN and the Galician People's Front (FPG). In the Galician elections of 2009 she was the top candidate of the FPG in the province of A Coruña.
- Suso Basterrechea López: Graduate in Fine Arts, plastic artist and high school teacher. He was the city councillor of culture between 2015 and 2019.

== Electoral results ==
Ferrol City Council
Election	Votes	%	Seats won
2015	7,230	21.99	6 / 25
2019	3,663	10.71	3 / 25

== See also ==
- Compostela Aberta
- Marea de Vigo
- Marea Atlántica
