= Opinion polling for the 2011 Spanish local elections =

In the run up to the 2011 Spanish local elections, various organisations carried out opinion polling to gauge voting intention in local entities in Spain. Results of such polls are displayed in this article. The date range for these opinion polls are from the previous local elections, held on 27 May 2007, to the day the next elections were held, on 22 May 2011.

Polls are listed in reverse chronological order, showing the most recent first and using the dates when the survey fieldwork was done, as opposed to the date of publication. Where the fieldwork dates are unknown, the date of publication is given instead. The highest percentage figure in each polling survey is displayed with its background shaded in the leading party's colour. If a tie ensues, this is applied to the figures with the highest percentages. The "Lead" columns on the right shows the percentage-point difference between the parties with the highest percentages in a given poll.

== Nationwide polling ==
The tables below list opinion polling results in reverse chronological order, showing the most recent first and using the dates when the survey fieldwork was done, as opposed to the date of publication. Where the fieldwork dates are unknown, the date of publication is given instead. The highest percentage figure in each polling survey is displayed with its background shaded in the leading party's colour. If a tie ensues, this is applied to the figures with the highest percentages. The "Lead" column on the right shows the percentage-point difference between the parties with the highest percentages in a poll.

=== Voting intention estimates ===
The table below lists nationwide voting intention estimates. Refusals are generally excluded from the party vote percentages, while question wording and the treatment of "don't know" responses and those not intending to vote may vary between polling organisations.

Polling firm/Commissioner	Fieldwork date	Sample size	Turnout	PP	PSOE	IU	CiU	UPyD	Lead
2011 local elections	22 May 2011	—N/a	66.2	37.5	27.8	7.4	3.5	2.1	9.7
Metroscopia/El País	27–28 Apr 2011	1,200	60–65	39.2	33.4	5.6	4.1	1.5	5.8
GAD/COPE	7–8 Feb 2011	501	?	37.6	30.1	–	–	–	7.5
2007 local elections	27 May 2007	—N/a	64.0	35.6	34.9	5.4	3.3	–	0.7

=== Voting preferences ===
The table below lists raw, unweighted voting preferences.

Polling firm/Commissioner	Fieldwork date	Sample size	PP	PSOE	IU	CiU	UPyD	Question	X mark	Lead
2011 local elections	22 May 2011	—N/a	24.4	18.1	4.8	2.2	1.3	—N/a	33.8	6.3
Metroscopia/El País	27–28 Apr 2011	1,200	22.8	22.1	5.1	2.6	0.7	28.8	5.1	0.7
2007 local elections	27 May 2007	—N/a	22.5	22.1	3.5	2.1	–	—N/a	36.0	0.4

== Sub-national polling ==
Opinion poll results for municipalities in each of Spain's autonomous communities, as well as for the Canarian and Balearic island councils, may be found below:

=== Andalusia ===
==== Málaga ====
Polling firm/Commissioner	Fieldwork date	Sample size	Turnout	PP	PSOE–A	IULV	Lead
2011 municipal election	22 May 2011	—N/a	55.6	53.5; 19	24.8; 9	11.0; 3	28.7
TNS Demoscopia/Antena 3	13 May 2011	?	?	54.6; 18	28.7; 10	9.3; 3	25.9
Metroscopia/PP	26 Mar 2010	?	?	? 18	? 11	? 2	?
2007 municipal election	27 May 2007	—N/a	50.2	51.0; 17	36.3; 12	7.2; 2	14.7

=== Galicia ===
==== A Coruña ====
Polling firm/Commissioner	Fieldwork date	Sample size	Turnout	PSdeG–PSOE	PP	BNG	EU–IU	Lead
2011 municipal election	22 May 2011	—N/a	59.2	26.7; 8	43.6; 14	12.0; 4	6.0; 1	16.9
TNS Demoscopia/Antena 3	3–4 May 2011	500	?	29.4; 9/10	38.7; 12/13	17.7; 5/6	4.8; 0	9.3
2007 municipal election	27 May 2007	—N/a	53.9	35.0; 11	31.4; 10	20.7; 6	3.2; 0	3.6

==== Vigo ====
Polling firm/Commissioner	Fieldwork date	Sample size	Turnout	PP	PSdeG–PSOE	BNG	Lead
2011 municipal election	22 May 2011	—N/a	62.4	42.4; 13	34.4; 11	11.3; 3	8.0
TNS Demoscopia/Antena 3	9 May 2011	500	?	46.1; 14	29.2; 9	14.3; 4	16.9
2007 municipal election	27 May 2007	—N/a	60.7	44.1; 13	29.4; 9	18.6; 5	14.7

=== Valencian Community ===
==== Alicante ====
Polling firm/Commissioner	Fieldwork date	Sample size	Turnout	PP	PSPV	EUPV	UPyD	Lead
2011 municipal election	22 May 2011	—N/a	61.9	52.1; 18	25.1; 8	7.6; 2	5.0; 1	27.0
TNS Demoscopia/Antena 3	5–6 May 2011	500	?	48.7; 15/16	35.2; 11/12	7.4; 2	–	13.5
2007 municipal election	27 May 2007	—N/a	60.2	44.1; 15	41.3; 14	4.9; 0	–	2.8
