= Unidade por Narón =

Unidade por Narón Unity for Narón
- Secretary-General: Xosé Manuel Blanco
- Ideology: Social democracy Galician nationalism Progressivism
- Political position: Centre-left
- Colors: Green
- Narón town council: 8 / 21

Unidade por Narón (Unity for Narón) is a municipal, independent, galician nationalist and progressist political party.

It has his roots in the Partido Socialista Galego-Esquerda Galega, and later in Unidade Galega. After Unidade Galega joined to BNG, the mayor of Narón Xoán Gato and his governing team in the municipality of Narón, unhappy with party's decision, split out and founded Unidade por Narón. The party governed in coalition with Esquerda Unida (95-99) and with BNG (99-03), and in 2003 they achieved 13 councillors out of 21, so they started to govern alone.

Later (2005) they joined the coalition of Terra Galega, being a founder member, and in the Galician municipal elections of 2007 they obtained 10 councillors at Narón.
