= Ganar Cádiz en Común =

- Founded: 2015
- Merger of: IULV–CA; Equo; CPCAD
- Political position: Left-wing
- Cádiz City Council: 2 / 27

Website
- www.transformarcadiz.org

Ganar Cádiz en Común (Spanish for Winning Cádiz in Common) is an electoral alliance formed by United Left/The Greens–Assembly for Andalusia, Equo and Citizens for Cádiz to contest the 2015 Cádiz municipal election.

== Member parties ==
- United Left/The Greens–Assembly for Andalusia (IULV–CA)
- Equo (eQuo)
- Citizens for Cádiz (CPCAD)

== Electoral performance ==
=== City Council of Cádiz ===
Date	Votes			Seats		Status	Size
Date	#	%	±pp	#	±	Status	Size
2015	5,487	8.4%	–1.7	2 / 27	1	Opposition	4th
