= 2019 Spanish local elections in Galicia =

This article presents the results breakdown of the local elections held in Galicia on 26 May 2019. The following tables show detailed results in the autonomous community's most populous municipalities, sorted alphabetically.

== City control ==
The following table lists party control in the most populous municipalities, including provincial capitals (shown in bold). Gains for a party are displayed with the cell's background shaded in that party's colour.

Municipality	Population	Previous control	New control
**A Coruña**	244,850	Atlantic Tide (Marea)	Socialists' Party of Galicia (PSdeG–PSOE)
Ferrol	66,799	Ferrol in Common–Son (Ferrol en Común)	Socialists' Party of Galicia (PSdeG–PSOE)
**Lugo**	98,025	Socialists' Party of Galicia (PSdeG–PSOE)	Socialists' Party of Galicia (PSdeG–PSOE)
**Ourense**	105,505	People's Party (PP)	Ourensan Democracy (DO)
**Pontevedra**	82,802	Galician Nationalist Bloc (BNG)	Galician Nationalist Bloc (BNG)
Santiago de Compostela	96,405	Open Compostela (CA)	Socialists' Party of Galicia (PSdeG–PSOE)
Vigo	293,642	Socialists' Party of Galicia (PSdeG–PSOE)	Socialists' Party of Galicia (PSdeG–PSOE)

== Municipalities ==
=== A Coruña ===
Population: 244,850

← Summary of the 26 May 2019 City Council of A Coruña election results →
Parties and alliances	Popular vote			Seats	
Parties and alliances	Votes	%	±pp	Total	+/-
People's Party (PP)	37,938	30.35	−0.55	9	−1
Socialists' Party of Galicia (PSdeG–PSOE)	37,528	30.02	+11.67	9	+3
Atlantic Tide (Marea)	25,290	20.23	−10.65	6	−4
Galician Nationalist Bloc (BNG)	8,950	7.16	+1.46	2	+1
Citizens–Party of the Citizenry (Cs)	7,245	5.80	+0.92	1	+1
Neighbours' Alternative (AV)	2,916	2.33	+0.79	0	±0
Vox (Vox)	2,655	2.12	New	0	±0
Animalist Party Against Mistreatment of Animals (PACMA)	982	0.79	−0.45	0	±0
Let's Win A Coruña (Gañemos)	375	0.30	New	0	±0
Corunnan Democracy (DCO)	277	0.22	New	0	±0
Spanish Phalanx of the CNSO (FE de las JONS)	52	0.04	New	0	±0
Blank ballots	812	0.65	−1.43		
Total	125,020			27	±0
Valid votes	125,020	99.57	+0.68		
Invalid votes	544	0.43	−0.68		
Votes cast / turnout	125,564	62.76	+2.68		
Abstentions	74,511	37.24	−2.68		
Registered voters	200,075				

=== Ferrol ===
Population: 66,799

← Summary of the 26 May 2019 City Council of Ferrol election results →
Parties and alliances	Popular vote			Seats	
Parties and alliances	Votes	%	±pp	Total	+/-
People's Party (PP)	14,142	41.34	+5.19	12	+1
Socialists' Party of Galicia (PSdeG–PSOE)	10,083	29.48	+11.19	8	+3
Ferrol in Common–Son in Common (Ferrol en Común)	3,663	10.71	−11.28	3	−3
Galician Nationalist Bloc (BNG)	2,523	7.38	−0.09	2	±0
Citizens–Party of the Citizenry (Cs)	1,258	3.68	−1.96	0	−1
Tide of Ferrol–Local Tides (Marea de Ferrol)	683	2.00	New	0	±0
Ferrolan Sense (SF)	510	1.49	New	0	±0
Vox (Vox)	350	1.02	+0.10	0	±0
Democratic Centre Coalition (CCD)	339	0.99	New	0	±0
Act Together (Xuntos Actúa)	195	0.57	New	0	±0
Linking (LiGanDo)	147	0.43	New	0	±0
Blank ballots	313	0.92	−1.45		
Total	34,206			25	±0
Valid votes	34,206	99.44	+1.18		
Invalid votes	191	0.56	−1.18		
Votes cast / turnout	34,397	61.14	+4.40		
Abstentions	21,861	38.86	−4.40		
Registered voters	56,258				

=== Lugo ===
Population: 98,025

← Summary of the 26 May 2019 City Council of Lugo election results →
Parties and alliances	Popular vote			Seats	
Parties and alliances	Votes	%	±pp	Total	+/−
People's Party (PP)	15,611	32.44	+0.45	10	+1
Socialists' Party of Galicia (PSdeG–PSOE)	12,731	26.45	−3.06	8	±0
Galician Nationalist Bloc (BNG)	7,873	16.36	+7.70	5	+3
Citizens–Party of the Citizenry (Cs)	4,001	8.31	+0.92	2	±0
We Can (Podemos)	1,924	4.00	New	0	±0
New Lugo–Local Tides (LugoNovo–Mareas Locais)	1,335	2.77	−8.60	0	−3
Citizen Left Alternative–Equo (ACE–EU–Equo)	1,317	2.74	−2.28	0	−1
Vox (Vox)	986	2.05	New	0	±0
Commitment to Galicia (CxG)	631	1.31	New	0	±0
Always Galicia (GaS)	602	1.25	New	0	±0
Independent Lugo Forum (FLI)	586	1.22	−0.07	0	±0
XXI Convergence (C21)	34	0.07	New	0	±0
Blank ballots	494	1.03	−1.09		
Total	48,125			25	±0
Valid votes	48,125	99.09	+1.15		
Invalid votes	443	0.91	−1.15		
Votes cast / turnout	48,568	61.44	+0.57		
Abstentions	30,479	38.56	−0.57		
Registered voters	79,047				

=== Ourense ===
Population: 105,505

← Summary of the 26 May 2019 City Council of Ourense election results →
Parties and alliances	Popular vote			Seats	
Parties and alliances	Votes	%	±pp	Total	+/−
Socialists' Party of Galicia (PSdeG–PSOE)	14,707	26.36	+7.34	9	+3
People's Party (PP)	12,579	22.55	−8.26	7	−3
Ourensan Democracy (DO)	12,011	21.53	−4.00	7	−1
Citizens–Party of the Citizenry (Cs)	4,866	8.72	New	2	+2
Galician Nationalist Bloc (BNG)	3,488	6.25	+1.61	2	+2
Ourense in Common (OUeC)	2,092	3.75	−6.59	0	−3
United We Can–United Left (Podemos–EU)	1,468	2.63	New	0	±0
Better Ourense–Local Tides (Ourense Mellor–Mareas Locais)	1,102	1.98	New	0	±0
Living Ourense (VOU)	1,041	1.87	New	0	±0
Common Space (EsCo)	819	1.47	New	0	±0
Vox (Vox)	729	1.31	New	0	±0
Commitment to Galicia (CxG)	201	0.36	−2.29	0	±0
For a Fairer World (PUM+J)	99	0.18	New	0	±0
Ourense Forward (adelante-ourense)	81	0.15	New	0	±0
Spanish Liberal Project (PLIE)	72	0.13	New	0	±0
Blank ballots	438	0.79	−1.10		
Total	55,793			27	±0
Valid votes	55,793	99.35	+1.07		
Invalid votes	363	0.65	−1.07		
Votes cast / turnout	56,156	64.82	+2.71		
Abstentions	30,479	35.18	−2.71		
Registered voters	86,635				

=== Pontevedra ===
Population: 82,802

← Summary of the 26 May 2019 City Council of Pontevedra election results →
Parties and alliances	Popular vote			Seats	
Parties and alliances	Votes	%	±pp	Total	+/−
Galician Nationalist Bloc (BNG)	16,500	39.79	−3.29	11	−1
People's Party (PP)	12,440	30.00	+2.90	9	+2
Socialists' Party of Galicia (PSdeG–PSOE)	5,797	13.98	+3.17	4	+1
Citizens–Party of the Citizenry (C's)	2,142	5.17	−0.56	1	±0
Pontevedra Tide–Local Tides (MaPo)	1,492	3.60	−4.54	0	−2
We Can–United Left, Son in Common (Podemos–eu,son en común)	1,260	3.04	New	0	±0
Vox (Vox)	1,023	2.47	New	0	±0
Commitment to Galicia (CxG)	203	0.49	−0.33	0	±0
Citizens of Galicia Democratic Action (ADCG)	105	0.25	New	0	±0
Blank ballots	504	1.22	−0.62		
Total	41,466			25	±0
Valid votes	41,466	99.19	+0.53		
Invalid votes	337	0.81	−0.53		
Votes cast / turnout	41,803	62.46	+2.18		
Abstentions	25,128	37.54	−2.18		
Registered voters	66,931				

=== Santiago de Compostela ===
Population: 96,405

← Summary of the 26 May 2019 City Council of Santiago de Compostela election results →
Parties and alliances	Popular vote			Seats	
Parties and alliances	Votes	%	±pp	Total	+/-
Socialists' Party of Galicia (PSdeG–PSOE)	18,150	34.70	+20.09	10	+6
People's Party (PP)	15,262	29.18	−4.32	8	−1
Open Compostela (CA)	10,651	20.36	−14.36	5	−5
Galician Nationalist Bloc (BNG)	4,870	9.31	+2.39	2	±0
Citizens–Party of the Citizenry (Cs)	1,660	3.17	−1.64	0	±0
Commitment to Galicia (CxG)	733	1.40	−1.02	0	±0
Vox (Vox)	584	1.12	New	0	±0
Blank ballots	396	0.76	−1.34		
Total	52,306			25	±0
Valid votes	52,306	99.44	+0.97		
Invalid votes	296	0.56	−0.97		
Votes cast / turnout	52,602	66.67	+4.39		
Abstentions	26,302	33.33	−4.39		
Registered voters	78,904				

=== Vigo ===
Population: 293,642

← Summary of the 26 May 2019 City Council of Vigo election results →
Parties and alliances	Popular vote			Seats	
Parties and alliances	Votes	%	±pp	Total	+/-
Socialists' Party of Galicia (PSdeG–PSOE)	101,055	67.63	+15.81	20	+3
People's Party (PP)	20,460	13.69	−6.83	4	−3
Tide of Vigo–Son in Common (Marea de Vigo)	10,384	6.95	−4.53	2	−1
Galician Nationalist Bloc (BNG)	8,461	5.66	+0.83	1	+1
Citizens–Party of the Citizenry (Cs)	3,624	2.43	−0.92	0	±0
Vox (Vox)	1,936	1.30	New	0	±0
Animalist Party Against Mistreatment of Animals (PACMA)	1,187	0.79	−0.34	0	±0
Commitment to Galicia (CxG)	309	0.21	−0.61	0	±0
Communist Party of the Workers of Galicia (PCTG)	267	0.18	New	0	±0
Citizens of Galicia Democratic Action (ADCG)	210	0.14	+0.04	0	±0
Blank Seats (EB)	158	0.11	New	0	±0
Blank ballots	1,374	0.92	−0.76		
Total	149,425			27	±0
Valid votes	149,425	99.55	+0.72		
Invalid votes	678	0.45	−0.72		
Votes cast / turnout	150,103	62.75	+2.64		
Abstentions	89,091	37.25	−2.64		
Registered voters	239,194				
