= Compostela Aberta =

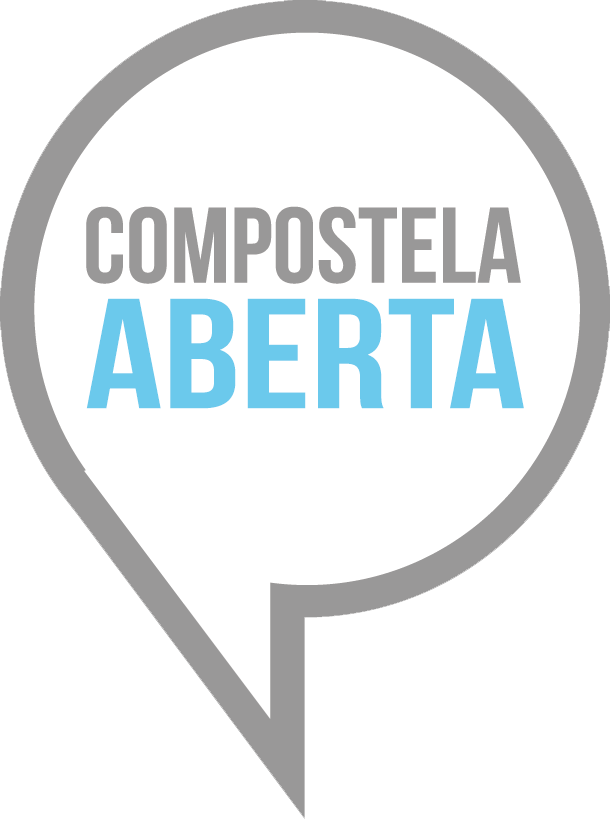
- Abbreviation: CA
- Leader: Martiño Noriega
- Founded: 2015
- Merger of: Independents; Anova-Nationalist Brotherhood; United Left; Podemos; Equo; Espazo Ecosocialista Galego
- Ideology: Participative democracy Galicianism
- Political position: Left-wing
- Regional affiliation: En Marea (2015–2019); Galicia en Común (2019–2023)
- Santiago de Compostela City Council: 2 / 25

Website
- compostelaaberta.org (gl)

Compostela Aberta (English: Open Compostela) is a grassroots movement and political coalition in the city of Santiago de Compostela that runs a left-wing "popular unity" candidacy. It was founded for the municipal elections of May 2015.

Martiño Noriega, a member of Anova-Nationalist Brotherhood (Anova) was elected as the candidate. The candidacy is supported by EU, Anova-Nationalist Brotherhood, Equo, Podemos, Espazo Ecosocialista Galego and independents. It's one of the many "popular unity" candidacies formed by left-wing political parties in Galicia and Spain to the Spanish local elections, 2015; like Marea Atlántica, Ahora Madrid, Barcelona en Comú, Zaragoza en Común, Marea de Vigo or Málaga Ahora.

== History ==
The members of the candidacy were elected, in addition to mayor Martiño Noriega, were María Rozas (financial management consultant and member of United Left), Jorge Duarte (architect, former president of the College of Architects of Galicia), Branca Novoneyra (writer and choreographer), Xan Duro (Verdegaia ecologist activist, member of the Espazo Ecosocialista Galego), Concha Fernández (former local leader of the Galician Nationalist Bloc, teacher of Community Social Intervention and former union activist), Manuel Dios Diz (president of the Galician Seminar of Education for Peace and also a member of the Espazo Ecosocialista Galego), Marta Lois (professor of Political Science), Rafa Peña Vidal (CIG unionist at the Lavacolla Airport and member of the Galician People's Front) and Noa Morales (expert in international relations and a member of United Left).

On June 13, Martiño Noriega was elected mayor of Santiago de Compostela. The "concellerías" (Local departments) were distributed the following way:

- Martiño Noriega Sánchez. Mayor. Spokesperson of the Local Government Council. Direct competences in Internal Regime (Personnel Recruitment, Archive, Innovation and Information Technology), Galician language, Participation and Neighborhood relationships.
- María Rozas Pérez. Councilor responsible for the Economy and Finance Department, with competences in Economic and Financial Planning, Tax Management, Budget Management and Fiscal Policy. First Deputy Mayor.
- Jorge Duarte Vázquez. Councillor responsible of Citizens Spaces, Right to Housing and Mobility, with competences in historic city, Rehabilitation, Urban planning, Urban development, Housing and Right to Mobility. Second Deputy Mayor.
- Branca Novoneyra. Councillor responsible for the Culture Department, with competences in Auditorio de Galicia, Teatro Principal, Network of socio-cultural centers and Popular festivities. Third Deputy Mayor.
- Xan Duro Fernández. Councillor responsible of the Environment and Coexistence Department, with competences in Sustainability (MSW, Water, Energy and Consumer Affairs), Public parks and Coexistence (Local Police, Fire and Civil Protection). Secretary of the Governing Board.
- Concepción Fernández Fernández. Councillor responsible for the Diversity and Social Department, with competences in Social policies, Diversity, Public health, Social economy, UMAD, UAMI and cooperation.
- Manuel Dios Diz. Councillor responsible for the Education and citizenship department, with competences in Education, Citizenship and Human rights. Member of the Provincial deputation.
- Marta Lois. Councillor responsible for the Equality, Economic Development and Tourism Department, with competences in Equality, Economic Promotion, Employment, Markets, Local business and Tourism.
- Rafael Peña Vidal. Councillor responsible for the Rural Areas and Territorial Balance Department, with competences in Rural Areas and the Brigade of Public Works.
- Noa Morales Sánchez. Councillor responsible for the Youth, Sport and Animal Welfare Department, with competences in Youth, Sport and Animal shelter.

== Electoral results ==
Santiago de Compostela City Council
Election	Votes	%	Seats won
2015	16,704	34.72	10 / 25
2019	10,651	20.36	5 / 25
2023	4,446	9.16	2 / 25

== See also ==
- Marea Atlántica
- Marea de Pontevedra
- Marea de Vigo
