= 2015 Spanish local elections in Galicia =

This article presents the results breakdown of the local elections held in Galicia on 24 May 2015. The following tables show detailed results in the autonomous community's most populous municipalities, sorted alphabetically.

== City control ==
The following table lists party control in the most populous municipalities, including provincial capitals (shown in bold). Gains for a party are displayed with the cell's background shaded in that party's colour.

Municipality	Population	Previous control	New control
**A Coruña**	244,810	People's Party (PP)	Atlantic Tide (Marea)
Ames	29,975	People's Party (PP)	Socialists' Party of Galicia (PSdeG–PSOE)
Arteixo	30,857	People's Party (PP)	People's Party (PP)
Cambre	24,029	People's Party (PP)	Union for Cambre (UxC)
Carballo	31,288	Galician Nationalist Bloc (BNG)	Galician Nationalist Bloc (BNG)
Culleredo	29,434	Socialists' Party of Galicia (PSdeG–PSOE)	Socialists' Party of Galicia (PSdeG–PSOE)
Ferrol	70,389	People's Party (PP)	Ferrol in Common (FeC)
Lalín	20,158	People's Party (PP)	Commitment to Galicia–Transparent Councils (CxG–CCTT)
**Lugo**	98,560	Socialists' Party of Galicia (PSdeG–PSOE)	Socialists' Party of Galicia (PSdeG–PSOE)
Narón	39,574	Galician Land (TeGa)	Galician Land (TeGa)
Oleiros	34,563	Neighbours' Alternative (AV)	Neighbours' Alternative (AV)
**Ourense**	106,905	Socialists' Party of Galicia (PSdeG–PSOE)	People's Party (PP)
**Pontevedra**	82,946	Galician Nationalist Bloc (BNG)	Galician Nationalist Bloc (BNG)
Redondela	29,909	People's Party (PP)	People's Party (PP)
Ribeira	27,565	People's Party (PP)	People's Party (PP)
Santiago de Compostela	95,800	People's Party (PP)	Open Compostela (CA)
Vigo	294,997	Socialists' Party of Galicia (PSdeG–PSOE)	Socialists' Party of Galicia (PSdeG–PSOE)
Vilagarcía de Arousa	37,712	People's Party (PP)	Socialists' Party of Galicia (PSdeG–PSOE)

== Municipalities ==
=== A Coruña ===
Population: 244,810

← Summary of the 24 May 2015 City Council of A Coruña election results →
Parties and alliances	Popular vote			Seats	
Parties and alliances	Votes	%	±pp	Total	+/−
People's Party (PP)	36,885	30.90	−12.72	10	−4
Atlantic Tide (Marea)^{1}	36,857	30.88	+24.86	10	+9
Socialists' Party of Galicia (PSdeG–PSOE)	21,908	18.35	−8.31	6	−2
Galician Nationalist Bloc–Open Assemblies (BNG)	6,809	5.70	−6.35	1	−3
Citizens–Party of the Citizenry (C's)	5,830	4.88	New	0	±0
Corunnan Union–Citizens (UC)	4,553	3.81	−0.14	0	±0
Neighbours' Alternative (AV)	1,834	1.54	New	0	±0
Animalist Party Against Mistreatment of Animals (PACMA)	1,476	1.24	+0.39	0	±0
Union, Progress and Democracy (UPyD)	728	0.61	−0.31	0	±0
Blank ballots	2,486	2.08	−2.48		
Total	119,366			27	±0
Valid votes	119,366	98.89	+0.74		
Invalid votes	1,343	1.11	−0.74		
Votes cast / turnout	120,709	60.08	+0.89		
Abstentions	80,198	39.92	−0.89		
Registered voters	200,907				
Sources
Footnotes: ^{1} Atlantic Tide results are compared to United Left–The Greens totals in the 2011 election.

=== Ames ===
Population: 29,975

← Summary of the 24 May 2015 City Council of Ames election results →
Parties and alliances	Popular vote			Seats	
Parties and alliances	Votes	%	±pp	Total	+/−
People's Party (PP)	2,518	18.26	−26.66	4	−7
Socialists' Party of Galicia (PSdeG–PSOE)	2,510	18.20	−9.80	4	−2
Citizen Initiative–New Ames (Ames Novo)^{1}	2,474	17.94	+14.74	4	+4
With You We Can (CP)	1,744	12.65	New	3	+3
Pact for Ames (PxA)	1,720	12.47	New	3	+3
Galician Nationalist Bloc–Open Assemblies (BNG)	1,426	10.34	−5.93	2	−2
Citizens–Party of the Citizenry (C's)	1,079	7.82	New	1	+1
Blank ballots	319	2.31	−1.76		
Total	13,790			21	±0
Valid votes	13,790	97.93	+0.47		
Invalid votes	291	2.07	−0.47		
Votes cast / turnout	14,081	61.51	−1.49		
Abstentions	8,810	38.49	+1.49		
Registered voters	22,891				
Sources
Footnotes: ^{1} Citizen Initiative–New Ames results are compared to United Left totals in the 2011 election.

=== Arteixo ===
Population: 30,857

← Summary of the 24 May 2015 City Council of Arteixo election results →
Parties and alliances	Popular vote			Seats	
Parties and alliances	Votes	%	±pp	Total	+/−
People's Party (PP)	6,890	49.24	+1.94	13	+2
Socialists' Party of Galicia (PSdeG–PSOE)	2,313	16.53	+0.93	4	+1
Galician Nationalist Bloc–Open Assemblies (BNG)	1,571	11.23	−4.51	2	−1
Galician Land (TeGa)	1,053	7.53	−10.28	2	−2
Neighbours' Alternative (AV)	633	4.52	New	0	±0
Son Arteixo–Anova (Son)	621	4.44	New	0	±0
Citizens–Party of the Citizenry (C's)	543	3.88	New	0	±0
Galician Identity (IdeGa)	45	0.32	New	0	±0
Blank ballots	324	2.32	−1.23		
Total	13,993			21	±0
Valid votes	13,993	98.06	−0.21		
Invalid votes	277	1.94	+0.21		
Votes cast / turnout	14,270	58.47	−0.68		
Abstentions	10,137	41.53	+0.68		
Registered voters	24,407				

=== Cambre ===
Population: 24,029

← Summary of the 24 May 2015 City Council of Cambre election results →
Parties and alliances	Popular vote			Seats	
Parties and alliances	Votes	%	±pp	Total	+/−
People's Party (PP)	2,607	24.27	−4.47	6	−1
Union for Cambre (UxC)	2,155	20.06	+6.15	5	+2
Socialists' Party of Galicia (PSdeG–PSOE)	2,128	19.81	+0.04	5	±0
Citizen Assembly of Cambre–Son (Son)^{1}	1,271	11.83	+1.14	2	±0
Galician Nationalist Bloc–Open Assemblies (BNG)	1,194	11.11	+3.83	2	±0
Citizens–Party of the Citizenry (C's)	544	5.06	New	1	+1
Let's Win Cambre (Ganemos)	500	4.65	New	0	±0
Progressives of Cambre (PdeC)	n/a	n/a	−6.67	0	−1
Democratic Galicianist Party (PGD)	n/a	n/a	−5.27	0	−1
Blank ballots	344	3.20	−1.48		
Total	10,743			21	±0
Valid votes	10,743	97.63	−0.33		
Invalid votes	261	2.37	+0.33		
Votes cast / turnout	11,004	56.73	−3.69		
Abstentions	8,392	43.27	+3.69		
Registered voters	19,396				
Sources
Footnotes: ^{1} Citizen Assembly of Cambre–Son results are compared to United Left totals in the 2011 election.

=== Carballo ===
Population: 31,288

← Summary of the 24 May 2015 City Council of Carballo election results →
Parties and alliances	Popular vote			Seats	
Parties and alliances	Votes	%	±pp	Total	+/−
Galician Nationalist Bloc–Open Assemblies (BNG)	7,512	47.01	+2.93	11	+1
People's Party (PP)	3,747	23.45	−10.75	5	−3
Galician Land (TeGa)	2,275	14.24	+3.17	3	+1
Socialists' Party of Galicia (PSdeG–PSOE)	1,676	10.49	+1.97	2	+1
Commitment to Galicia–Transparent Councils (CxG–CCTT)	217	1.36	New	0	±0
Son Carballo (Son)	188	1.18	New	0	±0
Blank ballots	365	2.28	+0.15		
Total	15,980			21	±0
Valid votes	15,980	98.29	−0.66		
Invalid votes	278	1.71	+0.66		
Votes cast / turnout	16,258	62.41	−6.90		
Abstentions	9,792	37.59	+6.90		
Registered voters	26,050				

=== Culleredo ===
Population: 29,434

← Summary of the 24 May 2015 City Council of Culleredo election results →
Parties and alliances	Popular vote			Seats	
Parties and alliances	Votes	%	±pp	Total	+/−
Socialists' Party of Galicia (PSdeG–PSOE)^{1}	4,797	36.17	−23.35	9	−4
People's Party (PP)	2,233	16.84	−6.15	4	−1
Neighbours' Alternative (AV)	1,849	13.94	New	3	+3
Culleredo Neighbourhood Tide (MVC)	1,668	12.58	New	3	+3
Galician Nationalist Bloc–Open Assemblies (BNG)	987	7.44	−4.86	1	−2
Citizens–Party of the Citizenry (C's)	786	5.93	New	1	+1
Let's Win Culleredo (Ganemos)	574	4.33	New	0	±0
Blank ballots	368	2.77	−2.42		
Total	13,262			21	±0
Valid votes	13,262	98.14	+0.56		
Invalid votes	252	1.86	−0.56		
Votes cast / turnout	13,514	57.89	−1.36		
Abstentions	9,829	42.11	+1.36		
Registered voters	23,343				
Sources
Footnotes: ^{1} Socialists' Party of Galicia results are compared to the combined totals of Socialists' Party of Galicia and Progressive Group of Culleredo in the 2011 election.

=== Ferrol ===
Population: 70,389

← Summary of the 24 May 2015 City Council of Ferrol election results →
Parties and alliances	Popular vote			Seats	
Parties and alliances	Votes	%	±pp	Total	+/−
People's Party (PP)	11,885	36.15	−7.57	11	−2
Ferrol in Common–Son (FeC)^{1}	7,230	21.99	+12.76	6	+4
Socialists' Party of Galicia (PSdeG–PSOE)	6,014	18.29	−5.87	5	−2
Galician Nationalist Bloc–Open Assemblies (BNG)	2,457	7.47	−1.02	2	±0
Citizens–Party of the Citizenry (C's)	1,853	5.64	New	1	+1
Artabran Tide (Marea Ártabra)	1,631	4.96	New	0	±0
Vox (Vox)	304	0.92	New	0	±0
Union, Progress and Democracy (UPyD)	286	0.87	−0.15	0	±0
Communists of Galicia (CdG–PCPE)	276	0.84	New	0	±0
Galician Convergence (CG)	160	0.49	−3.00	0	±0
Independents for Ferrol (IF)	n/a	n/a	−5.27	0	−1
Blank ballots	778	2.37	−2.25		
Total	32,874			25	±0
Valid votes	32,874	98.26	+0.32		
Invalid votes	582	1.74	−0.32		
Votes cast / turnout	33,456	56.74	+1.58		
Abstentions	25,512	43.26	−1.58		
Registered voters	58,968				
Sources
Footnotes: ^{1} Ferrol in Common–Son results are compared to United Left totals in the 2011 election.

=== Lalín ===
Population: 20,158

← Summary of the 24 May 2015 City Council of Lalín election results →
Parties and alliances	Popular vote			Seats	
Parties and alliances	Votes	%	±pp	Total	+/−
People's Party (PP)	5,326	44.70	−19.13	10	−4
Commitment to Galicia–Transparent Councils (CxG–CCTT)	3,020	25.35	New	6	+6
Socialists' Party of Galicia (PSdeG–PSOE)	1,725	14.48	−3.86	3	−1
Citizen Open Platform of Lalín (APAC)	770	6.46	New	1	+1
Galician Nationalist Bloc–Open Assemblies (BNG)	628	5.27	−3.78	1	−1
Democratic Galicianist Party (PGD)	289	2.43	−4.05	0	−1
Blank ballots	156	1.31	−1.00		
Total	11,914			21	±0
Valid votes	11,914	97.75	+0.07		
Invalid votes	274	2.25	−0.07		
Votes cast / turnout	12,188	73.52	+0.78		
Abstentions	4,390	26.48	−0.78		
Registered voters	16,578				

=== Lugo ===
Population: 98,560

← Summary of the 24 May 2015 City Council of Lugo election results →
Parties and alliances	Popular vote			Seats	
Parties and alliances	Votes	%	±pp	Total	+/−
People's Party (PP)	15,132	31.99	−12.22	9	−3
Socialists' Party of Galicia (PSdeG–PSOE)	13,959	29.51	−8.87	8	−3
New Lugo (LN)	5,379	11.37	New	3	+3
Galician Nationalist Bloc–Open Assemblies (BNG)	4,098	8.66	−0.36	2	±0
Citizens–Party of the Citizenry (C's)	3,493	7.39	New	2	+2
Citizen Left Alternative (ACE–EU)^{1}	2,376	5.02	+1.83	1	+1
Animalist Party Against Mistreatment of Animals (PACMA)	707	1.49	New	0	±0
Independent Lugo Forum (FLI)	611	1.29	New	0	±0
Union, Progress and Democracy (UPyD)	536	1.13	+0.48	0	±0
Blank ballots	1,004	2.12	−0.98		
Total	47,295			25	±0
Valid votes	47,295	97.94	−0.14		
Invalid votes	996	2.06	+0.14		
Votes cast / turnout	48,291	60.87	−5.94		
Abstentions	31,045	39.13	+5.94		
Registered voters	79,336				
Sources
Footnotes: ^{1} Citizen Left Alternative results are compared to United Left totals in the 2011 election.

=== Narón ===
Population: 39,574

← Summary of the 24 May 2015 City Council of Narón election results →
Parties and alliances	Popular vote			Seats	
Parties and alliances	Votes	%	±pp	Total	+/−
Galician Land (TeGa)	6,408	38.51	+4.92	10	+2
People's Party (PP)	3,639	21.87	−10.44	5	−3
Socialists' Party of Galicia (PSdeG–PSOE)	1,489	8.95	−0.03	2	±0
Galician Nationalist Bloc–Open Assemblies (BNG)	1,353	8.13	−2.72	2	±0
United Left (EU)	1,008	6.06	+2.86	1	+1
Electors We Choose Narón (ENE)	888	5.34	New	1	+1
Citizens–Party of the Citizenry (C's)	787	4.73	New	0	±0
Galician Convergence (CG)	710	4.27	−2.12	0	−1
Blank ballots	359	2.16	−2.52		
Total	16,641			21	±0
Valid votes	16,641	98.46	+0.07		
Invalid votes	260	1.54	−0.07		
Votes cast / turnout	16,901	52.33	−1.61		
Abstentions	15,397	47.67	+1.61		
Registered voters	32,298				

=== Oleiros ===
Population: 34,563

← Summary of the 24 May 2015 City Council of Oleiros election results →
Parties and alliances	Popular vote			Seats	
Parties and alliances	Votes	%	±pp	Total	+/−
Neighbours' Alternative (AV)	9,830	60.68	+12.21	14	+3
People's Party (PP)	3,348	20.67	−11.86	4	−3
Socialists' Party of Galicia (PSdeG–PSOE)	1,527	9.43	+0.69	2	±0
Galician Nationalist Bloc–Open Assemblies (BNG)	966	5.96	+0.68	1	±0
Blank ballots	529	3.27	−0.17		
Total	16,200			21	±0
Valid votes	16,200	98.52	+0.07		
Invalid votes	244	1.48	−0.07		
Votes cast / turnout	16,444	59.41	−5.66		
Abstentions	11,235	40.59	+5.66		
Registered voters	27,679				

=== Ourense ===
Population: 106,905

← Summary of the 24 May 2015 City Council of Ourense election results →
Parties and alliances	Popular vote			Seats	
Parties and alliances	Votes	%	±pp	Total	+/−
People's Party (PP)	16,510	30.81	−7.03	10	−1
Ourensan Democracy (DO)	13,679	25.53	+17.58	8	+6
Socialists' Party of Galicia (PSdeG–PSOE)	10,191	19.02	−17.65	6	−5
Ourense in Common (OUeC)^{1}	5,543	10.34	+8.44	3	+3
Galician Nationalist Bloc–Open Assemblies (BNG)	2,486	4.64	−6.15	0	−3
Renewal–Nationalist Brotherhood (Anova)	1,485	2.77	New	0	±0
Commitment to Galicia–Transparent Councils (CxG–CCTT)	1,419	2.65	New	0	±0
Animalist Party Against Mistreatment of Animals (PACMA)	612	1.14	New	0	±0
Union, Progress and Democracy (UPyD)	376	0.70	+0.19	0	±0
Citizens' Democratic Renewal Movement (RED)	149	0.28	New	0	±0
Galician Coalition Party (CG)	120	0.22	New	0	±0
Blank ballots	1,014	1.89	−0.70		
Total	53,584			27	±0
Valid votes	53,584	98.28	+0.27		
Invalid votes	939	1.72	−0.27		
Votes cast / turnout	54,523	62.11	−4.20		
Abstentions	33,263	37.89	+4.20		
Registered voters	87,786				
Sources
Footnotes: ^{1} Ourense in Common results are compared to United Left totals in the 2011 election.

=== Pontevedra ===
Population: 82,946

← Summary of the 24 May 2015 City Council of Pontevedra election results →
Parties and alliances	Popular vote			Seats	
Parties and alliances	Votes	%	±pp	Total	+/−
Galician Nationalist Bloc–Open Assemblies (BNG)	17,050	43.08	+3.82	12	+1
People's Party (PP)	10,725	27.10	−12.42	7	−4
Socialists' Party of Galicia (PSdeG–PSOE)	4,277	10.81	−2.49	3	±0
Pontevedra Tide (MaPo)^{1}	3,222	8.14	+6.51	2	+2
Citizens–Party of the Citizenry (C's)	2,268	5.73	New	1	+1
Everyone for Pontevedra (Tod@s)	723	1.83	New	0	±0
Commitment to Galicia–Transparent Councils (CxG–CCTT)	324	0.82	New	0	±0
Union, Progress and Democracy (UPyD)	259	0.65	−0.28	0	±0
Blank ballots	728	1.84	−0.46		
Total	39,576			25	±0
Valid votes	39,576	98.66	−0.06		
Invalid votes	536	1.34	+0.06		
Votes cast / turnout	40,112	60.28	−7.10		
Abstentions	26,431	39.72	+7.10		
Registered voters	66,543				
Sources
Footnotes: ^{1} Pontevedra Tide results are compared to United Left totals in the 2011 election.

=== Redondela ===
Population: 29,909

← Summary of the 24 May 2015 City Council of Redondela election results →
Parties and alliances	Popular vote			Seats	
Parties and alliances	Votes	%	±pp	Total	+/−
People's Party (PP)	6,047	37.95	−3.92	9	−1
Socialists' Party of Galicia (PSdeG–PSOE)	4,244	26.63	−4.69	6	−2
Redondela Electors' Group 2015 (AER)	2,837	17.80	+12.55	4	+3
Galician Nationalist Bloc–Open Assemblies (BNG)	1,176	7.38	−2.98	1	−1
Redondela Can (PodeR)	849	5.33	New	1	+1
Son Redondela (Son)^{1}	320	2.01	+0.35	0	±0
Citizens of Democratic Centre (CCD)	233	1.46	New	0	±0
Blank ballots	230	1.44	−0.25		
Total	15,936			21	±0
Valid votes	15,936	98.32	+2.28		
Invalid votes	273	1.68	−2.28		
Votes cast / turnout	16,209	65.29	−1.37		
Abstentions	8,617	34.71	+1.37		
Registered voters	24,826				
Sources
Footnotes: ^{1} Son Redondela results are compared to United Left totals in the 2011 election.

=== Ribeira ===
Population: 27,565

← Summary of the 24 May 2015 City Council of Ribeira election results →
Parties and alliances	Popular vote			Seats	
Parties and alliances	Votes	%	±pp	Total	+/−
People's Party (PP)	5,206	40.96	−16.24	9	−4
Galician Nationalist Bloc–Open Assemblies (BNG)	2,206	17.36	+0.53	4	−2
Socialists' Party of Galicia (PSdeG–PSOE)	2,175	17.11	+1.26	3	±0
Citizens–Party of the Citizenry (C's)	1,632	12.84	New	3	+3
Progressive Initiative of Ribeira (IPR)	1,256	9.88	+1.75	2	+1
Blank ballots	234	1.84	−0.15		
Total	12,709			21	±0
Valid votes	12,709	97.60	−1.27		
Invalid votes	313	2.40	+1.27		
Votes cast / turnout	13,022	59.15	−4.24		
Abstentions	8,995	40.85	+4.24		
Registered voters	22,017				

=== Santiago de Compostela ===
Population: 95,800

← Summary of the 24 May 2015 City Council of Santiago de Compostela election results →
Parties and alliances	Popular vote			Seats	
Parties and alliances	Votes	%	±pp	Total	+/−
Open Compostela (CA)^{1}	16,704	34.72	+30.76	10	+10
People's Party (PP)	16,117	33.50	−9.76	9	−4
Socialists' Party of Galicia (PSdeG–PSOE)	7,031	14.61	−16.35	4	−5
Galician Nationalist Bloc–Open Assemblies (BNG)	3,329	6.92	−6.36	2	−1
Citizens–Party of the Citizenry (C's)	2,314	4.81	New	0	±0
Commitment to Galicia–Transparent Councils (CxG–CCTT)	1,163	2.42	New	0	±0
Internationalist Solidarity and Self-Management (SAIn)	307	0.64	−0.23	0	±0
XXI Convergence (C21)	140	0.29	−0.25	0	±0
Blank ballots	1,012	2.10	−1.73		
Total	48,117			25	±0
Valid votes	48,117	98.47	+0.52		
Invalid votes	748	1.53	−0.52		
Votes cast / turnout	48,865	62.28	−0.16		
Abstentions	29,591	37.72	+0.16		
Registered voters	78,456				
Sources
Footnotes: ^{1} Open Compostela results are compared to United Left totals in the 2011 election.

=== Vigo ===
Population: 294,997

← Summary of the 24 May 2015 City Council of Vigo election results →
Parties and alliances	Popular vote			Seats	
Parties and alliances	Votes	%	±pp	Total	+/−
Socialists' Party of Galicia (PSdeG–PSOE)	73,533	51.82	+17.39	17	+6
People's Party (PP)	29,110	20.52	−21.87	7	−6
Tide of Vigo–Son (MdeV)^{1}	16,292	11.48	+6.95	3	+3
Galician Nationalist Bloc–Open Assemblies (BNG)	6,848	4.83	−6.43	0	−3
Citizens–Party of the Citizenry (C's)	4,757	3.35	New	0	±0
Let's Win Vigo (Gañemos Vigo)	2,460	1.73	New	0	±0
Animalist Party Against Mistreatment of Animals (PACMA)	1,608	1.13	New	0	±0
Commitment to Galicia–Transparent Councils (CxG–CCTT)	1,162	0.82	New	0	±0
Equo–Pirates (QP)	791	0.56	New	0	±0
Union, Progress and Democracy (UPyD)	688	0.48	−0.72	0	±0
Citizens' Democratic Renewal Movement (RED)	653	0.46	New	0	±0
Zero Cuts (Recortes Cero)	379	0.27	New	0	±0
Communists of Galicia (CdG–PCPE)	378	0.27	New	0	±0
Independent Initiative (II)	296	0.21	New	0	±0
Humanist Party (PH)	229	0.16	−0.06	0	±0
Galician Coalition Party (CG)	180	0.13	New	0	±0
Centre Democratic Action of Galicia (ADCG)	148	0.10	New	0	±0
Blank ballots	2,377	1.68	−1.14		
Total	141,889			27	±0
Valid votes	141,889	98.83	+0.94		
Invalid votes	1,683	1.17	−0.94		
Votes cast / turnout	143,572	60.11	−2.33		
Abstentions	95,275	39.89	+2.33		
Registered voters	238,847				
Sources
Footnotes: ^{1} Tide of Vigo–Son results are compared to United Left totals in the 2011 election.

=== Vilagarcía de Arousa ===
Population: 37,712

← Summary of the 24 May 2015 City Council of Vilagarcía de Arousa election results →
Parties and alliances	Popular vote			Seats	
Parties and alliances	Votes	%	±pp	Total	+/−
Socialists' Party of Galicia (PSdeG–PSOE)	6,221	34.22	+10.00	8	+3
People's Party (PP)	5,338	29.37	−12.74	7	−3
United Left–Son (EU–Son)	2,820	15.51	+5.57	3	+1
Galician Nationalist Bloc–Open Assemblies (BNG)	1,676	9.22	−4.28	2	−1
Direct Democratic Participation of Galicia (PDDdG)	1,499	8.25	New	1	+1
Union, Progress and Democracy (UPyD)	266	1.46	New	0	±0
Independents for Vilagarcía (IVIL)	n/a	n/a	−6.52	0	−1
Blank ballots	357	1.96	−0.43		
Total	18,177			21	±0
Valid votes	18,177	97.64	−0.74		
Invalid votes	440	2.36	+0.74		
Votes cast / turnout	18,617	60.87	−3.32		
Abstentions	11,969	39.13	+3.32		
Registered voters	30,586				
