= 2011 Spanish local elections in Galicia =

This article presents the results breakdown of the local elections held in Galicia on 22 May 2011. The following tables show detailed results in the autonomous community's most populous municipalities, sorted alphabetically.

== City control ==
The following table lists party control in the most populous municipalities, including provincial capitals (shown in bold). Gains for a party are displayed with the cell's background shaded in that party's colour.

Municipality	Population	Previous control	New control
**A Coruña**	246,047	Socialists' Party of Galicia (PSdeG–PSOE)	People's Party (PP)
Ferrol	73,638	Socialists' Party of Galicia (PSdeG–PSOE)	People's Party (PP)
**Lugo**	97,635	Socialists' Party of Galicia (PSdeG–PSOE)	Socialists' Party of Galicia (PSdeG–PSOE)
**Ourense**	108,673	Socialists' Party of Galicia (PSdeG–PSOE)	Socialists' Party of Galicia (PSdeG–PSOE)
**Pontevedra**	81,981	Galician Nationalist Bloc (BNG)	Galician Nationalist Bloc (BNG)
Santiago de Compostela	94,824	Socialists' Party of Galicia (PSdeG–PSOE)	People's Party (PP)
Vigo	297,124	Socialists' Party of Galicia (PSdeG–PSOE)	Socialists' Party of Galicia (PSdeG–PSOE)

== Municipalities ==
=== A Coruña ===
Population: 246,047

← Summary of the 22 May 2011 City Council of A Coruña election results →
Parties and alliances	Popular vote			Seats	
Parties and alliances	Votes	%	±pp	Total	+/−
People's Party (PP)	51,286	43.62	+12.19	14	+4
Socialists' Party of Galicia (PSdeG–PSOE)	31,341	26.66	−8.34	8	−3
Galician Nationalist Bloc (BNG)	14,165	12.05	−8.64	4	−2
United Left–The Greens (EU–V)	7,075	6.02	+2.79	1	+1
Corunnan Union (UC)	4,640	3.95	New	0	±0
Union, Progress and Democracy (UPyD)	1,083	0.92	New	0	±0
Animalist Party Against Mistreatment of Animals (PACMA)	999	0.85	New	0	±0
Political Draw (Sorteo)	523	0.44	New	0	±0
Humanist Party (PH)	491	0.42	+0.27	0	±0
XXI Convergence (C.XXI)	274	0.23	New	0	±0
Electronic Voting Assembly (AVE)	195	0.17	New	0	±0
Renewed United Democratic Centre (CDUR)	134	0.11	New	0	±0
Corunnan People with Good Arguments 2007 (CORCOBA)	0	0.00	−2.16	0	±0
Blank ballots	5,357	4.56	+1.41		
Total	117,563			27	±0
Valid votes	117,563	98.15	−1.22		
Invalid votes	2,222	1.85	+1.22		
Votes cast / turnout	119,785	59.19	+5.29		
Abstentions	82,590	40.81	−5.29		
Registered voters	202,375				

=== Ferrol ===
Population: 73,638

← Summary of the 22 May 2011 City Council of Ferrol election results →
Parties and alliances	Popular vote			Seats	
Parties and alliances	Votes	%	±pp	Total	+/−
People's Party (PP)	14,974	43.72	+18.09	13	+6
Socialists' Party of Galicia (PSdeG–PSOE)	8,273	24.16	−8.13	7	−2
United Left (EU)	3,160	9.23	−4.96	2	−2
Galician Nationalist Bloc (BNG)	2,906	8.49	−0.29	2	±0
Independents for Ferrol (IF)	1,806	5.27	−7.55	1	−2
Galician Convergence (CG)	1,196	3.49	New	0	±0
Union, Progress and Democracy (UPyD)	349	1.02	New	0	±0
Blank ballots	1,582	4.62	+2.11		
Total	34,246			25	±0
Valid votes	34,246	97.94	−1.33		
Invalid votes	2,222	2.06	+1.33		
Votes cast / turnout	34,967	57.08	+1.49		
Abstentions	26,292	42.92	−1.49		
Registered voters	61,259				

=== Lugo ===
Population: 97,635

← Summary of the 22 May 2011 City Council of Lugo election results →
Parties and alliances	Popular vote			Seats	
Parties and alliances	Votes	%	±pp	Total	+/−
People's Party (PP)	22,853	44.21	+8.70	12	+3
Socialists' Party of Galicia (PSdeG–PSOE)	19,840	38.38	−6.66	11	−1
Galician Nationalist Bloc (BNG)	4,663	9.02	−5.27	2	−2
United Left (EU)	1,648	3.19	+1.54	0	±0
Democratic Galicianist Party (PGD)	747	1.45	New	0	±0
Union, Progress and Democracy (UPyD)	337	0.65	New	0	±0
Blank ballots	1,605	3.10	+1.29		
Total	51,693			25	±0
Valid votes	51,693	98.08	−1.27		
Invalid votes	1,013	1.92	+1.27		
Votes cast / turnout	52,706	66.81	+2.31		
Abstentions	26,184	33.19	−2.31		
Registered voters	78,890				

=== Ourense ===
Population: 108,673

← Summary of the 22 May 2011 City Council of Ourense election results →
Parties and alliances	Popular vote			Seats	
Parties and alliances	Votes	%	±pp	Total	+/−
People's Party (PP)	21,564	37.84	−4.41	11	−2
Socialists' Party of Galicia (PSdeG–PSOE)	20,896	36.67	+10.14	11	+3
Galician Nationalist Bloc (BNG)	6,146	10.79	−9.00	3	−3
Ourensan Democracy (DO)	4,529	7.95	+5.11	2	+2
United Left (EU)	1,080	1.90	+1.05	0	±0
For a Fairer World (PUM+J)	543	0.95	New	0	±0
Union, Progress and Democracy (UPyD)	292	0.51	New	0	±0
Initiative for Ourense (IpOU)	260	0.46	New	0	±0
Galician Land (TeGa)	196	0.34	−2.45	0	±0
Blank ballots	1,477	2.59	+0.92		
Total	56,983			27	±0
Valid votes	56,983	98.01	−1.21		
Invalid votes	1,156	1.99	+1.21		
Votes cast / turnout	58,139	66.31	+4.14		
Abstentions	29,532	33.69	−4.14		
Registered voters	87,671				

=== Pontevedra ===
Population: 81,981

← Summary of the 22 May 2011 City Council of Pontevedra election results →
Parties and alliances	Popular vote			Seats	
Parties and alliances	Votes	%	±pp	Total	+/−
People's Party (PP)	17,244	39.52	−4.63	11	−1
Galician Nationalist Bloc (BNG)	17,130	39.26	+11.00	11	+4
Socialists' Party of Galicia (PSdeG–PSOE)	5,803	13.30	−9.03	3	−3
United Left (EU)	711	1.63	+0.28	0	±0
Alternative Pontevedra (POAL)	672	1.54	New	0	±0
Union, Progress and Democracy (UPyD)	405	0.93	New	0	±0
Anti-Bullfighting Party Against Mistreatment of Animals (PACMA)	319	0.73	New	0	±0
Os Praceres Citizen Initiative (ICP)	280	0.64	−0.51	0	±0
Communist Unification of Spain (UCE)	67	0.15	New	0	±0
Blank ballots	1,005	2.30	+0.13		
Total	43,636			25	±0
Valid votes	43,636	98.72	−0.59		
Invalid votes	567	1.28	+0.59		
Votes cast / turnout	44,203	67.38	+6.88		
Abstentions	21,398	32.62	−6.88		
Registered voters	65,601				

=== Santiago de Compostela ===
Population: 94,824

← Summary of the 22 May 2011 City Council of Santiago de Compostela election results →
Parties and alliances	Popular vote			Seats	
Parties and alliances	Votes	%	±pp	Total	+/−
People's Party (PP)	20,751	43.28	+4.27	13	+2
Socialists' Party of Galicia (PSdeG–PSOE)	14,846	30.96	−7.23	9	−1
Galician Nationalist Bloc (BNG)	6,370	13.28	−3.17	3	−1
United Left (EU)	1,898	3.96	+1.62	0	±0
Union, Progress and Democracy (UPyD)	968	2.02	New	0	±0
People's Candidacy (Candidatura do Povo)	602	1.26	New	0	±0
Internationalist Solidarity and Self-Management (SAIn)	417	0.87	New	0	±0
XXI Convergence (C.XXI)	261	0.54	New	0	±0
Blank ballots	1,836	3.83	+1.12		
Total	47,949			25	±0
Valid votes	47,949	97.95	−1.25		
Invalid votes	1,006	2.05	+1.25		
Votes cast / turnout	48,955	62.44	+5.97		
Abstentions	29,446	37.56	−5.97		
Registered voters	78,401				

=== Vigo ===
Population: 297,124

← Summary of the 22 May 2011 City Council of Vigo election results →
Parties and alliances	Popular vote			Seats	
Parties and alliances	Votes	%	±pp	Total	+/−
People's Party (PP)	61,616	42.39	−1.73	13	±0
Socialists' Party of Galicia (PSdeG–PSOE)	50,045	34.43	+5.00	11	+2
Galician Nationalist Bloc (BNG)	16,374	11.26	−7.32	3	−2
United Left (EU)	6,588	4.53	+2.94	0	±0
The Greens–Green Group (OV–GV)	2,441	1.68	New	0	±0
Union, Progress and Democracy (UPyD)	1,746	1.20	New	0	±0
For a Fairer World (PUM+J)	799	0.55	New	0	±0
Galician People's Front (FPG)	566	0.39	+0.03	0	±0
Liberal Democratic Centre (CDL)	321	0.22	+0.09	0	±0
Humanist Party (PH)	317	0.22	−0.02	0	±0
Communist Unification of Spain (UCE)	166	0.11	New	0	±0
Spanish Phalanx of the CNSO (FE de las JONS)	146	0.10	New	0	±0
XXI Convergence (C.XXI)	135	0.09	New	0	±0
Blank ballots	4,105	2.82	+0.74		
Total	145,365			27	±0
Valid votes	145,365	97.89	−1.23		
Invalid votes	3,130	2.11	+1.23		
Votes cast / turnout	148,495	62.44	+1.72		
Abstentions	89,320	37.56	−1.72		
Registered voters	237,815				
