= Galicia en Común =

Galicia in Common Galicia en Común
- Spokesperson in Congress: Antón Gómez-Reino (Note: As spokesperson for the "Galicia en Común" sub-group within the Unidas Podemos confederal parliamentary group.)
- Founded: 15 March 2019
- Dissolved: 2023
- Split from: En Marea
- Headquarters: Pl. Quintana de Vivos, 3; 15704, Santiago de Compostela
- Ideology: Democratic socialism Participatory democracy Galician nationalism
- Political position: Left-wing
- National affiliation: Unidas Podemos (confluence)
- Colors: Purple; Dark blue Lilac; Pastel
- Members: See list of members

Website
- www.gecam.gal www.encomun.gal

Galicia en Común (English: "Galicia in Common") was a left-wing alliance in Galicia formed by Podemos and United Left (EU) as a successor to the En Marea alliance, which after turning into a party broke up from their three constituent parties in early 2019 as a result of political and leadership differences. The alliance has contested the April 2019 and November 2019 Spanish general elections under the En Común–Unidas Podemos label (English: "In Common–United We Can"), and it also exists as a sub-group within the Unidas Podemos confederal parliamentary group in the Congress of Deputies. In September 2019, Podemos and EU, together with Renewal–Nationalist Brotherhood, comprised the Grupo Común da Esquerda (English: "Common Group of the Left" or "Left Common Group") parliamentary group, and the alliance is scheduled to be renewed ahead of the 2020 Galician regional election.

== History ==
The political space until then represented under the umbrella of the En Marea party had broken up in January 2019 after internal disputes throughout the two previous years had reached their peak in December 2018, following the election of a new party leadership under Luis Villares which had seen the party's founding partners—Podemos, Renewal–Nationalist Brotherhood (Anova) and United Left (EU)—accusing the former of fraud and vote rigging, prompting their withdrawal from En Marea and their dubbing of it as a "failed" political project.

Subsequently, Podemos and EU contested the April 2019 general election as an electoral alliance under the "In Common–United We Can" label (Spanish: En Común–Unidas Podemos), which for this election also included Equo and Mareas en Común (English: "Tides in Common"), a "phantom" political organization registered in August 2018—and which evoked the name of the platform that saw En Marea's inception in the July 2016 Vigo assembly—amid the ongoing crisis within the En Marea confluence. After the election, the alliance formed the "Galicia in Common" (Spanish: Galicia en Común) sub-group within the Unidas Podemos confederal parliamentary group in the Congress of Deputies. Ahead of the November 2019 general election, the alliance was renewed as a Podemos–EU-only coalition, after Equo had left it to run with Más País. The local "tides" (mareas)—such as Marea Atlántica and Compostela Aberta—and Anova chose not to participate in either electoral contest, the latter citing difficulties in reaching an agreement for an electoral "broad front".

In September 2019, after Villares-aligned deputies had left the still-existing En Marea group in the Parliament of Galicia, MPs from Podemos, EU and Anova formed the Grupo Común da Esquerda group, which considered itself a successor to the Galician Left Alternative alliance. While it has been pointed out by members that the group would be a key for the constitution of "a candidacy of rupturist unity" succeeding the late En Marea coalition ahead of the next Galician election, it was noted that the parliamentary group's name did not advance the denomination of any prospective electoral brand.

The alliance was reformed under the Galicia in Common label with Podemos, EU, Anova and the local tides ahead of the 2020 Galician regional election, with the coalition being maintained without significant changes even after the suspension of the election's initial date on 5 April as a result of the COVID-19 pandemic and its postponement to 12 July.

== Composition ==
Party	Notes
We Can (Podemos)	
United Left (EU)	
Renewal–Nationalist Brotherhood (Anova)	Did not contest the 2019 general elections.
Atlantic Tide (Marea)	Did not contest the 2019 general elections.
Open Compostela (CA)	Did not contest the 2019 general elections.
Equo Galicia (Equo)	Left in September 2019. (Note: Joined Más País.)

== Electoral performance ==
=== Parliament of Galicia ===
Parliament of Galicia
Election	Votes	%	#	Seats	+/–	Leading candidate	Status in legislature
2020	51,223	3.93%	4th	0 / 75	14 (Note: Compared to En Marea totals in the 2016 regional election.)	Antón Gómez-Reino	No seats

=== Cortes Generales ===
Cortes Generales
Election	Congress					Senate	
Election	Votes	%	#	Seats	+/–	Seats	+/–
2019 (Apr)	238,061	14.46%	3rd	2 / 23	3 (Note: Compared to En Marea totals in the 2016 general election.)	0 / 16	1
2019 (Nov)	188,231	12.65%	3rd	2 / 23	0	0 / 16	0

== Symbols ==
Logo of the Grupo Común da Esquerda.

Logo in the April 2019 general election.

Logo in the November 2019 general election.

Logo in the 2020 Galician regional election.
