= Terra Galega =

Spanish political party

Galician Land Terra Galega
- President: Pablo Padín Sánchez
- Secretary-General: Xermán Tobío Padín
- Founded: November 4, 2005
- Youth wing: Mocedade de Terra Galega
- Ideology: Galician nationalism Social liberalism
- Political position: Centre
- Colors: Green, orange, blue
- Slogan: Galicia, a nosa forza (Galicia, our strength)
- Mayors in Galicia: 1 / 313
- Local Government: 18 / 3,721

Website
- terragalega.eu

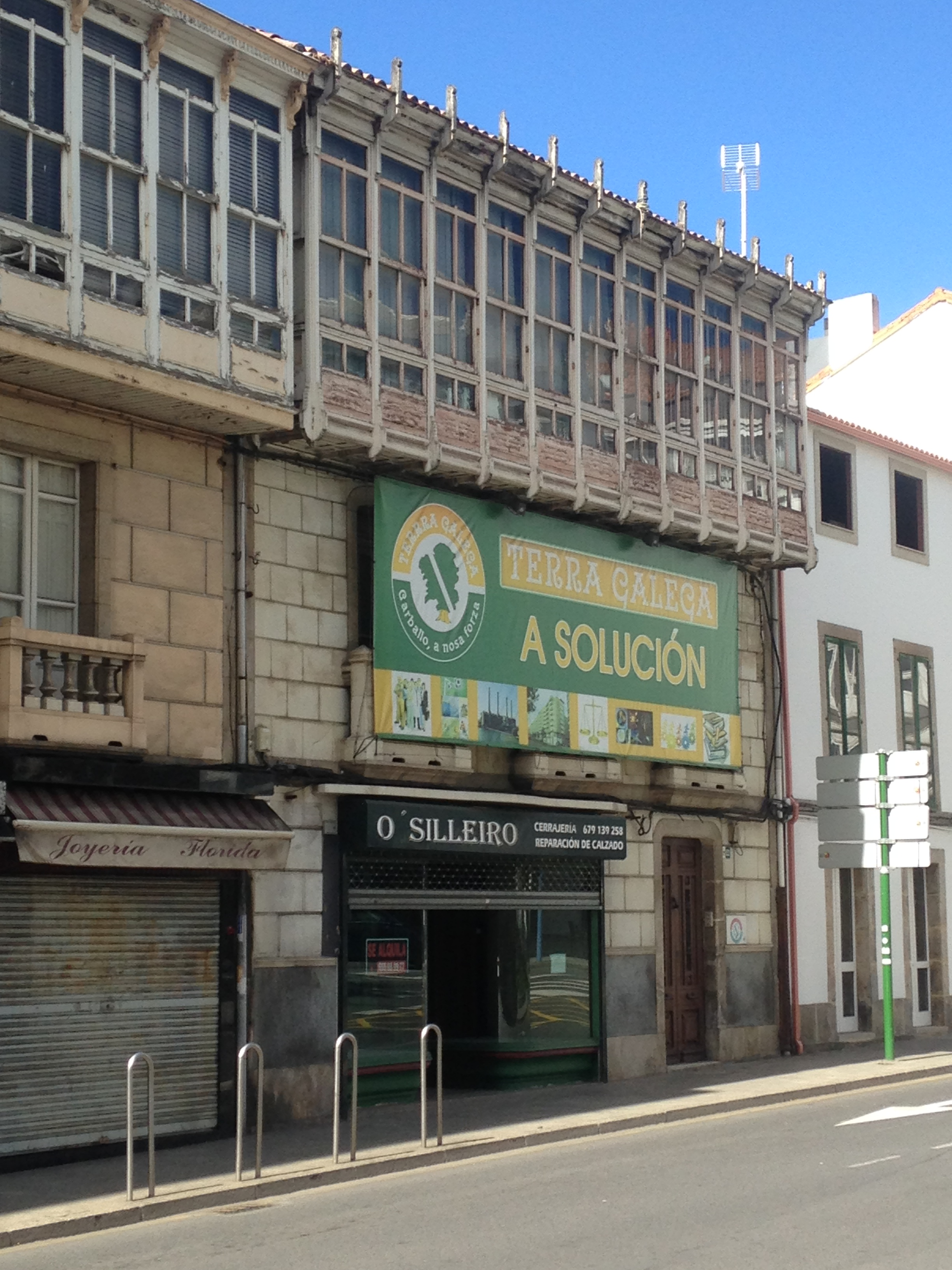
Office of TEGA in Carballo.

Terra Galega (TeGa, in English: Galician Land) is a coalition of centrist and Galician nationalist political parties; it was established on November 4, 2005; but the name has been registered since May 2005.

== History ==
It was formed by Centro Democrático Independente (CDI), Iniciativa Galega, Coalición Galega, Unidade por Narón and other local political forces that have elected 4 mayors and 64 councillors in 32 Galician municipalities. The coalition held a Constituent Congress on May 20, 2006; with the participation of 500 future members that chose Pablo Padín, former minister of Health of Galicia, as president; and Xoán Gato, mayor of Narón, as General Coordinator. Guillermo Sánchez Fojo was named "Vice-Coordinator of the Northern Zone", Xosé Luis Vilas Martín was named "Vice-Coordinator of the South Zone" and Marian Ferreiro Díaz was named "National Coordinator of Youth". The youth members of TeGa are named Mocedade de Terra Galega (Youth Of Galician Land).

In October 2006, Unión Ourensana joined the coalition and along with 6 of the 12 councilors from the People's Party of Galicia at Arteixo. In the municipal elections of 2007 the coalition presented 63 candidatures, mainly in the province of A Coruña, and they obtained 66 councillors. In 2010 a sector of the party split and formed a new organization, Galician Convergence. In the local elections of 2011 TeGa only gained 23 town councillors and 1 mayor (in Narón) In the local elections of 2015 TeGa won 29 town councillors and 2 mayors (Narón and Coristanco).

== Electoral results ==
=== Galician elections ===
Parliament of Galicia
Election	Votes	%	Seats won
2009	18,726	1.11	0 / 75

=== Local elections ===
Municipal councils of Galicia
Election	Votes	%	Seats won
2007	33,626	2.04	66 / 3,847
2011	13,986	0.88	23 / 3,811
2015	14,272	0.96	29 / 3,766
2019	9,966	0.66	18 / 3,721
