= Ourensan Democracy =

Ourensan Democracy Democracia Ourensana
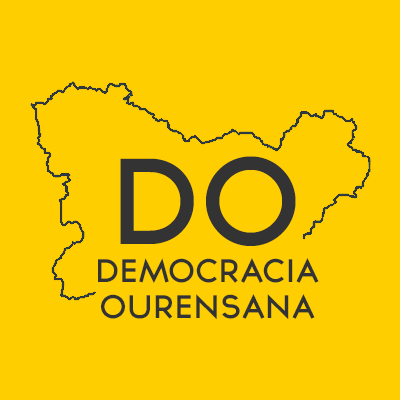
- Leader: Gonzalo Pérez Jácome
- Founded: June 2001
- Headquarters: Praza Maior 1, 32005 Ourense (Soto da casa do concello)
- Ideology: Right-wing populism Localism
- Party Television: Auria TV
- Slogan: "Neither right nor left, from Ourense"
- Parliament of Galicia (Ourense seats): 1 / 14
- Ourense City Council: 10 / 27
- Provincial deputation of Ourense: 3 / 25
- Mayors in Ourense: 1 / 92
- Local government in Ourense: 11 / 876

Website
- democraciaourensana.es

Ourensan Democracy (Galician: Democracia Ourensana, DO) is a political party active in the Province of Ourense, mainly in the Comarca of Ourense. DO was created in June 2001 by Gonzalo Pérez Jácome, who has been the party's main leader since its foundation. The party has its own TV channel, Auria TV.

== Electoral results ==
=== Parliament of Galicia ===
Parliament of Galicia
Election	Leading candidate	Votes	%	Seats	+/–	Government
2005	Rafael Martínez	623	0.04 (#11)	0 / 75	0	Opposition
2009	Manuel Álvarez	1,066	0.06 (#12)	0 / 75	0	Opposition
2012	Rafael Martínez	4,245	0.29 (#10)	0 / 75	0	Opposition
2016	José Miguel Caride	7,723	0.54 (#7)	0 / 75	0	Opposition
2024	Armando Ojea	15,312	1.04 (#6)	1 / 75	1	Opposition

=== Ourense City Council ===
City Council of Ourense
Election	Leading candidate	Votes	%	Seats	+/–	Government
2003	Gonzalo Pérez Jácome	284	0.46 (#7)	0 / 27	0	Opposition
2007	Gonzalo Pérez Jácome	1,757	2.84 (#5)	0 / 27	0	Opposition
2011	Gonzalo Pérez Jácome	4,529	7.95 (#4)	2 / 27	2	Opposition
2015	Gonzalo Pérez Jácome	13,679	25.53 (#2)	8 / 27	6	Opposition
2019	Gonzalo Pérez Jácome	12,011	21.53 (#3)	7 / 27	1	Government
2023	Gonzalo Pérez Jácome	18,388	33.72 (#1)	10 / 27	3	Government
