= Gonzalo Pérez Jácome =

Spanish politician

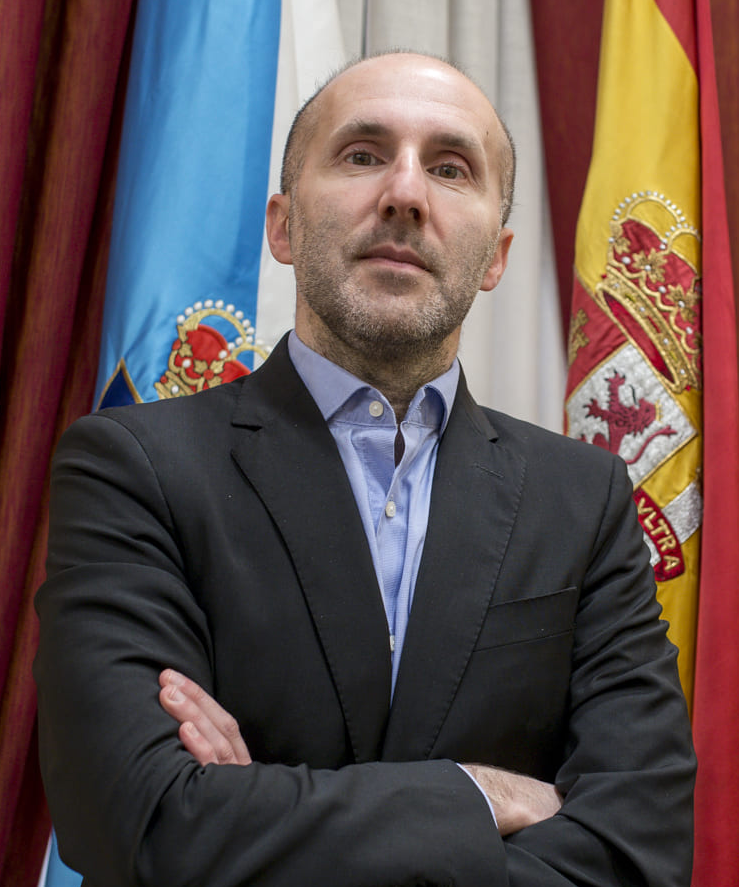

Gonzalo Pérez Jácome (born 2 August 1969) is a Spanish politician who is the founder and leader of the party Ourensan Democracy (DO). He was elected to Ourense's city council in 2011 and has served as its mayor since 2019.

== Biography ==
Jácome's father and sister died in a traffic accident when he was 8 years old. He was expelled from two schools. A pianist from the age of seven he inherited his father's musical instrument shop, Jolper; the name came from his father's, José Luis Pérez. Jácome has taken part in races up the stairs of the Empire State Building and the Gran Hotel Bali in Benidorm.

In 2001, Jácome founded the political party Ourensan Democracy (DO), which he promoted with the local television channel Auria TV featuring the populist character "Miño Man". After failed attempts in 2003 and 2007, the party entered the city council in 2011 with two seats; he was frequently expelled from sessions for insulting others. His fellow member Susana Gómez Valencia resigned shortly before the 2015 election due to disagreements with him, while the party grew to eight seats and became the second largest in the council. DO voted for Jácome to be mayor instead of taking up the offer to form a coalition government with the Spanish Socialist Workers' Party (PSOE), that would see that party take the mayor's office. Jácome said that the PSOE had the choice of being in government with him as mayor, or having the People's Party (PP) rule.

In April 2015, after proposing cuts to Ourense's municipal band, Jácome was struck with an egg by a man from Pontevedra. In November 2018, the man began a one-year prison sentence due to his previous convictions, in addition to a €1,060 fine.

Jácome was elected mayor of Ourense in 2019 as his party and the PP totalled 14 seats on the council. The PP did not applaud his inauguration, which had been part of a deal for that party to lead the provincial deputation of the Province of Ourense. In 2023, his party was the most voted for, taking ten seats. The PP (7), PSOE (6) and the Galician Nationalist Bloc (BNG; 4) could not conclude a pact to oust him, so the PP voted for themselves and again allowed him to govern in exchange for keeping the provincial government.

Jácome's party entered the Parliament of Galicia in the 2024 election, though due to regional laws preventing mayors for running for that body, his long-term right-hand man Armando Ojea was the one elected. Jácome said that his party would cooperate with any other that would defend the wellbeing of his native province.
