= 2007 Spanish local elections in Galicia =

This article presents the results breakdown of the local elections held in Galicia on 27 May 2007. The following tables show detailed results in the autonomous community's most populous municipalities, sorted alphabetically.

== City control ==
The following table lists party control in the most populous municipalities, including provincial capitals (shown in bold). Gains for a party are displayed with the cell's background shaded in that party's colour.

Municipality	Population	Previous control	New control
**A Coruña**	243,320	Socialists' Party of Galicia (PSdeG–PSOE)	Socialists' Party of Galicia (PSdeG–PSOE)
Ferrol	76,399	People's Party (PP)	Socialists' Party of Galicia (PSdeG–PSOE)
**Lugo**	93,450	Socialists' Party of Galicia (PSdeG–PSOE)	Socialists' Party of Galicia (PSdeG–PSOE)
**Ourense**	108,137	People's Party (PP)	Socialists' Party of Galicia (PSdeG–PSOE)
**Pontevedra**	80,096	Galician Nationalist Bloc (BNG)	Galician Nationalist Bloc (BNG)
Santiago de Compostela	93,458	Socialists' Party of Galicia (PSdeG–PSOE)	Socialists' Party of Galicia (PSdeG–PSOE)
Vigo	293,255	People's Party (PP)	Socialists' Party of Galicia (PSdeG–PSOE)

== Municipalities ==
=== A Coruña ===
Population: 243,320

← Summary of the 27 May 2007 City Council of A Coruña election results →
Parties and alliances	Popular vote			Seats	
Parties and alliances	Votes	%	±pp	Total	+/−
Socialists' Party of Galicia (PSdeG–PSOE)	41,290	35.00	−10.70	11	−3
People's Party (PP)	37,087	31.43	+7.37	10	+3
Galician Nationalist Bloc (BNG)	24,415	20.69	−2.01	6	±0
United Left (EU–IU)	3,806	3.23	+0.71	0	±0
Galicianist Party (PG)	3,770	3.20	New	0	±0
Corunnan People with Good Arguments 2007 (CORCOBA)	2,546	2.16	New	0	±0
For a Fairer World (PUM+J)	676	0.57	New	0	±0
Republican Left–Galician Republican Left (IR–ERG)	337	0.29	New	0	±0
Humanist Party (PH)	180	0.15	−0.32	0	±0
Democratic and Social Centre (CDS)	164	0.14	New	0	±0
Blank ballots	3,714	3.15	−0.42		
Total	117,985			27	±0
Valid votes	117,985	99.37	+0.06		
Invalid votes	747	0.63	−0.06		
Votes cast / turnout	118,732	53.90	−3.44		
Abstentions	101,533	46.10	+3.44		
Registered voters	220,265				

=== Ferrol ===
Population: 76,399

← Summary of the 27 May 2007 City Council of Ferrol election results →
Parties and alliances	Popular vote			Seats	
Parties and alliances	Votes	%	±pp	Total	+/−
Socialists' Party of Galicia (PSdeG–PSOE)	11,842	32.29	+19.29	9	+5
People's Party (PP)	9,400	25.63	+1.15	7	±0
United Left (EU–IU)	5,203	14.19	+4.74	4	+2
Independents for Ferrol (IF)	4,703	12.82	−9.70	3	−3
Galician Nationalist Bloc (BNG)	3,219	8.78	−13.85	2	−4
Galician Land (TeGa)	1,022	2.79	New	0	±0
The Greens–Green Group (OV–GV)	366	1.00	New	0	±0
Blank ballots	919	2.51	−0.06		
Total	36,674			25	±0
Valid votes	36,674	99.27	−0.09		
Invalid votes	271	0.73	+0.09		
Votes cast / turnout	36,945	55.59	−7.92		
Abstentions	29,511	44.41	+7.92		
Registered voters	66,456				

=== Lugo ===
Population: 93,450

← Summary of the 27 May 2007 City Council of Lugo election results →
Parties and alliances	Popular vote			Seats	
Parties and alliances	Votes	%	±pp	Total	+/−
Socialists' Party of Galicia (PSdeG–PSOE)	23,375	45.04	−6.32	12	−1
People's Party (PP)	18,428	35.51	+2.48	9	±0
Galician Nationalist Bloc (BNG)	7,417	14.29	+2.80	4	+1
Galician Land (TeGa)	884	1.70	New	0	±0
United Left (EU–IU)	854	1.65	+0.19	0	±0
Blank ballots	939	1.81	+0.05		
Total	51,897			25	±0
Valid votes	51,897	99.35	−0.07		
Invalid votes	339	0.65	+0.07		
Votes cast / turnout	52,236	64.50	−5.13		
Abstentions	28,754	35.50	+5.13		
Registered voters	80,990				

=== Ourense ===
Population: 108,137

← Summary of the 27 May 2007 City Council of Ourense election results →
Parties and alliances	Popular vote			Seats	
Parties and alliances	Votes	%	±pp	Total	+/−
People's Party (PP)	26,160	42.25	−4.23	13	−1
Socialists' Party of Galicia (PSdeG–PSOE)	16,428	26.53	+6.89	8	+2
Galician Nationalist Bloc (BNG)	12,253	19.79	−4.65	6	−1
Galicianist Party (PG)	1,905	3.08	New	0	±0
Ourensan Democracy (DO)	1,757	2.84	+2.38	0	±0
Galician Land (TeGa)	1,730	2.79	New	0	±0
United Left (EU–IU)	528	0.85	−0.50	0	±0
Humanist Party (PH)	65	0.10	−0.10	0	±0
Democratic and Social Centre (CDS)	60	0.10	New	0	±0
Blank ballots	1,034	1.67	−0.30		
Total	61,920			27	±0
Valid votes	61,920	99.22	−0.05		
Invalid votes	485	0.78	+0.05		
Votes cast / turnout	62,405	62.17	+0.62		
Abstentions	37,980	37.83	−0.62		
Registered voters	100,385				

=== Pontevedra ===
Population: 80,096

← Summary of the 27 May 2007 City Council of Pontevedra election results →
Parties and alliances	Popular vote			Seats	
Parties and alliances	Votes	%	±pp	Total	+/−
People's Party (PP)	19,387	44.15	+8.47	12	+2
Galician Nationalist Bloc (BNG)	12,412	28.26	−10.67	7	−3
Socialists' Party of Galicia (PSdeG–PSOE)	9,807	22.33	+4.42	6	+1
United Left (EU–IU)	594	1.35	+0.47	0	±0
Os Praceres Citizen Initiative (ICP)	504	1.15	−0.34	0	±0
Humanist Party (PH)	133	0.30	New	0	±0
National Democracy (DN)	68	0.15	New	0	±0
Popular Spanish Social Party (SEP)	56	0.13	New	0	±0
Blank ballots	953	2.17	+0.13		
Total	43,914			25	±0
Valid votes	43,914	99.31	−0.07		
Invalid votes	304	0.69	+0.07		
Votes cast / turnout	44,218	60.50	−2.75		
Abstentions	28,871	39.50	+2.75		
Registered voters	73,089				

=== Santiago de Compostela ===
Population: 93,458

← Summary of the 27 May 2007 City Council of Santiago de Compostela election results →
Parties and alliances	Popular vote			Seats	
Parties and alliances	Votes	%	±pp	Total	+/−
People's Party (PP)	18,664	39.01	+2.61	11	+1
Socialists' Party of Galicia (PSdeG–PSOE)	18,270	38.19	−2.13	10	−1
Galician Nationalist Bloc (BNG)	7,871	16.45	−0.30	4	±0
United Left (EU–IU)	1,119	2.34	+1.18	0	±0
Internationalist Solidarity and Self-Management (SAIn)	620	1.30	New	0	±0
Blank ballots	1,295	2.71	−0.68		
Total	47,839			25	±0
Valid votes	47,839	99.20	−0.04		
Invalid votes	388	0.80	+0.04		
Votes cast / turnout	48,227	56.47	−8.35		
Abstentions	37,183	43.53	+8.35		
Registered voters	85,410				

=== Vigo ===
Population: 293,255

← Summary of the 27 May 2007 City Council of Vigo election results →
Parties and alliances	Popular vote			Seats	
Parties and alliances	Votes	%	±pp	Total	+/−
People's Party (PP)	66,559	44.12	+11.01	13	+3
Socialists' Party of Galicia (PSdeG–PSOE)	44,398	29.43	+1.42	9	+1
Galician Nationalist Bloc (BNG)	28,030	18.58	−6.21	5	−2
Galicianist Party (PG)	4,909	3.25	New	0	±0
United Left (EU–IU)	2,395	1.59	−0.42	0	±0
Galician People's Front (FPG)	544	0.36	New	0	±0
Humanist Party (PH)	369	0.24	−0.05	0	±0
Left Vigo (VdE)	312	0.21	New	0	±0
Liberal Democratic Centre (CDL)	198	0.13	New	0	±0
Viguese Progressives–Galician Progressive Democracy (PROVI–DPG)	n/a	n/a	−6.53	0	−2
Blank ballots	3,132	2.08	−0.09		
Total	150,846			27	±0
Valid votes	150,846	99.12	−0.18		
Invalid votes	1,334	0.88	+0.18		
Votes cast / turnout	152,180	60.72	−3.14		
Abstentions	98,463	39.28	+3.14		
Registered voters	250,643				
