= Results breakdown of the 2015 Spanish local elections =

Results breakdown of the 2015 Spanish local elections may refer to:

- Results breakdown of the 2015 Spanish local elections (Andalusia)
- Results breakdown of the 2015 Spanish local elections (Aragon)
- Results breakdown of the 2015 Spanish local elections (Asturias)
- Results breakdown of the 2015 Spanish local elections (Balearic Islands)
- Results breakdown of the 2015 Spanish local elections (Basque Country)
- Results breakdown of the 2015 Spanish local elections (Canary Islands)
- Results breakdown of the 2015 Spanish local elections (Cantabria)
- Results breakdown of the 2015 Spanish local elections (Castile and León)
- Results breakdown of the 2015 Spanish local elections (Castilla–La Mancha)
- Results breakdown of the 2015 Spanish local elections (Catalonia)
- Results breakdown of the 2015 Spanish local elections (La Rioja)
- Results breakdown of the 2015 Spanish local elections (Community of Madrid)
- Results breakdown of the 2015 Spanish local elections (Galicia)
- Results breakdown of the 2015 Spanish local elections (Navarre)
- Results breakdown of the 2015 Spanish local elections (Region of Murcia)
- Results breakdown of the 2015 Spanish local elections (Valencian Community)
