= Málaga Ahora =

Málaga Now Málaga Ahora
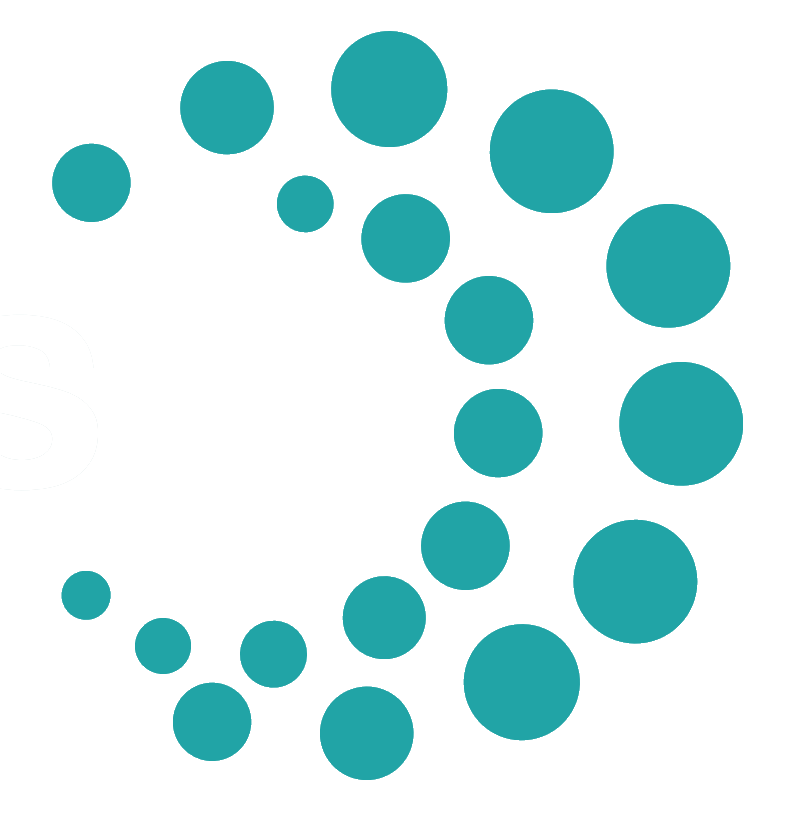
- Leader: Coordination Board
- Spokesperson: Ysabel Torralbo
- Founded: 7 January 2015
- Merger of: Podemos; Equo; Local social collectives and movements
- Headquarters: Málaga
- Ideology: Participatory democracy
- Colours: Persian green
- Málaga City Council: 4 / 31

Website
- malagaahora.org

Málaga Ahora (Spanish for Málaga Now) is a citizen platform of popular unity, formed as an instrumental party without organic internal life, in order to contest the municipal elections of 2015 in the city of Málaga.

For this project various organizations have converged, the most important being Ganemos Málaga, a citizen platform inspired by Guanyem Barcelona (now called Barcelona en Comú) and the political parties EQUO and Podemos.

== History ==
In June 2014 Ganemos Málaga was presented, supported by the Movement for Democracy, linked to the 15-M Movement. Ganemos Málaga appeared as an horizontal organization, based in district assemblies and supported by political parties and social movements.

The lawyer and activist of the Plataforma de Afectados por la Hipoteca, Ysabel Torralbo was elected as the candidate in the primary elections celebrated between the 9 and the 14 of march in 2015, with the participation of more than 1,000 people.

== Electoral performance ==
=== City Council of Málaga ===
Date	Votes			Seats		Status	Size
Date	#	%	±pp	#	±	Status	Size
2015	30,464	13.3%	+13.3	4 / 31	4	Opposition	3rd
2019	4,380	1.85%	-11.45	0 / 31	4	Extraparliamentary	6th
