= Marea de Vigo =

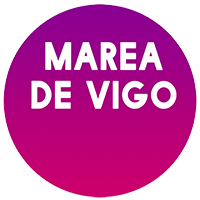
- Leader: Rubén Pérez Correa
- Founded: 2015
- Merged into: Anova-Nationalist Brotherhood; United Left; Independents
- Ideology: Participative democracy
- Political position: Left-wing
- National affiliation: SON
- City council of Vigo: 2 / 27

Website
- mareadevigo.org^{[usurped]}

Marea de Vigo (Tide of Vigo in Galician language) is a left-wing citizen movement and political alliance active in the city of Vigo, Spain.

== History ==
Marea de Vigo was created as a left-wing "popular unity" candidacy to the municipal elections of May 2015.

Rubén Pérez Correa, a member of the United Left (EU) was elected as the candidate. The candidacy is supported by EU, Anova-Nationalist Brotherhood, independents and some members of Podemos. It's one of the many "popular unity" candidacies formed by left-wing political parties in Galicia and Spain to the Spanish local elections, 2015; like Marea Atlántica, Ahora Madrid, Barcelona en Comú, Zaragoza en Común or Málaga Ahora.

Marea de Vigo was the 3rd most voted list in the Vigo local elections of 2015 (16,227 votes, 11.5%), gaining 3 seats in the city council.

=== Elected councillors (2019-2023) ===
- Rubén Pérez Correa: member of United Left and local coordinator of the party.
- Oriana Méndez Fuentes: member of Anova-Nationalist Brotherhood and the Galician People's Front.

== Electoral results ==
Vigo City Council
Election	Votes	%	Seats won
2015	16,292	11.48	3 / 27
2019	10,384	6.95	2 / 27
