= Marea Atlántica =

- Abbreviation: MAREA
- Leader: Xulio Ferreiro Baamonde
- Founded: 2014
- Merger of: Anova; EU; Podemos; CxG; Equo; EcoSoGal
- Headquarters: Rúa Juan Castro Mosquera, 26 1ºD
- Ideology: Participative democracy
- Political position: Left-wing
- National affiliation: En Marea
- Parliament of Galicia: 0 / 75
- A Coruña provincial deputation: 1 / 31
- A Coruña City Council: 6 / 27

Website
- mareatlantica.gal

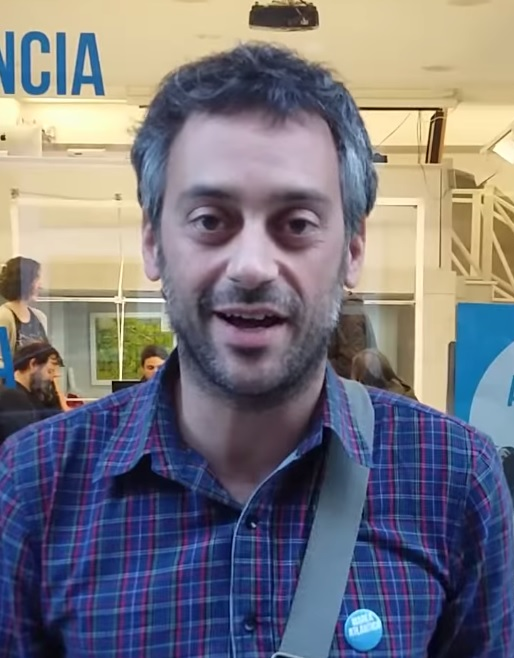
Xulio Ferreiro, mayor of A Coruña between 2015 and 2019.

Marea Atlántica (English: Atlantic Tide) is a grassroots movement and political coalition in the city of A Coruña, Spain.

== History ==
The original goal of the movement was to build a left-wing and participative political convergence towards the municipal elections of May 2015. After achieving 2,500 signatures, Marea Atlántica decided to present a candidacy to the city council (and mayor) of A Coruña. Xulio Ferreiro, a professor at the University of A Coruña, was elected as the candidate. This candidacy and movement is supported by various political parties, like EU, Anova-Nationalist Brotherhood, Compromiso por Galicia, Podemos, Equo and Espazo Ecosocialista Galego. Marea Atlántica was the most voted party in the A Coruña local elections of 2015 (34,864 votes, 30.97%), winning 10 seats in the city council.

In the municipal elections of 2019 the coalition lost four seats and the mayor of the city.

=== City councillors (2015–2019) ===
1. Xulio Ferreiro Baamonde (1974). Professor of Procedural Law at the University of A Coruña. Member of the CIG. Currently no party affiliation, although he was a member of the Galician Nationalist Bloc in the past.
2. Rocío Fraga (1976). Sociologist and feminist activist. No party affiliation.
3. Xiao Varela (1976). Architect and member of the Habitat Social cooperative. No party affiliation.
4. Silvia Cameán (1987). Lawyer and feminist activist. Member of the United Left party.
5. José Manuel Sande (1973). Worked for the Galician government. He is also a film writer, participating in the Luzes magazine and in the TV project Galiza Ano Cero.
6. María Eugenia Vieito (1970). Administration and Services Staff in the University of A Coruña. No party affiliation.
7. Alberto Lema (1975). English Philology graduate, writer and political activist. Writes in various magazines and newspapers, including Tempos Novos, Luzes and Sermos Galiza. Member of Anova-Nationalist Brotherhood and the CUT union, close to the Galician People's Front.
8. Claudia Delso (1987). Cultural mediator, psychomotor and theater teacher. No party affiliation.
9. Daniel Díaz (1981). Urbanist and member of the ecologist party Equo.
10. María García (1979). Environmentalist a cultural activist. No party affiliation.

== Electoral results ==
A Coruña City Council
Election	Votes	%	Seats won
2015	36,857	30.88	10 / 27
2019	25,290	20.23	6 / 27

== See also ==
- Compostela Aberta
- Marea de Pontevedra
- Marea de Vigo
- Ferrol en Común
