= Son (political party) =

- Founded: 2015
- Merger of: Renewal–Nationalist Brotherhood; United Left; Independents
- Ideology: Participative democracy
- Political position: Left
- Colors: Red, Yellow, Purple
- Local seats: 76 / 3,766
- Mayors in Galicia: 6 / 313

Website
- www.coalicionson.com

SON is a Galician political party created in 2015, promoted by Renewal–Nationalist Brotherhood (Anova) and United Left to participate in the local elections of the same year.

Its purpose is to provide legal support to those groups that, for legal reasons, had no possibility to run in the elections of their municipality. Likewise, SON also seeks to gain representation in the provincial deputations. In practice it is an "instrumental" party, without permanent bodies, and whose only objective is to support local candidacies.

== Election results ==
After the local elections, SON gained the mayoralties of Cangas, Ferrol, Manzaneda, Teo and Val do Dubra. In 2016, after a motion of no confidence, Son also gained the mayoralty of Mugardos.

SON gained 53,205 votes in total (3.61%).

Candidacy	Votes	%	Representatives	Municipality
Son de Abegondo-Foro Veciñal	212	6.34%	1 / 13	Abegondo
Son de Ares	262	7.9%	1 / 13	Ares
Son de Arteixo-ANOVA	621	4.44%	0 / 13	Arteixo
Esquerda Unida-SON	680	11.23%	2 / 17	Baiona
Alternativa para Beariz-SON	70	12.28%	1 / 9	Beariz
Son de Bergondo-ANOVA	599	16.3%	2 / 13	Bergondo
Betanzos Novo-SON	1002	14.58%	2 / 17	Betanzos
Xuntos por Boborás-SON	179	11.42%	1 / 11	Boborás
Boiro Novo-SON	927	9.71%	1 / 17	Boiro
Assemblea Cidadá Bueu-SON	342	5.6%	1 / 17	Bueu
Assemblea Cidadá de Cambre-SON	1271	11.83%	2 / 21	Cambre
Alternativa Canguesa de Esquerdas-SON	2268	17.14%	4 / 21	Cangas
Alternativa Veciñal do Carballiño-SON	471	6.06%	1 / 17	O Carballiño
Son Carballo	188	1.18%	0 / 21	Carballo
Assemblea Cidadá de Carral-SON	413	12.41%	1 / 13	Carral
Ferrol en Común-SON	7142	21.98%	6 / 25	Ferrol
Esquerda Unida-SON	831	14.11%	2 / 17	O Grove
Esquerda Unida-SON	190	5.68%	0 / 13	A Illa de Arousa
Fai O Irixo-SON	134	11.87%	1 / 9	O Irixo
Son D'aquí	176	4.8%	0 / 13	Malpica de Bergantiños
Son de Manzaneda-ANOVA	485	64.07%	5 / 7	Manzaneda
Marea Veciñal de Marín-SON	1570	13.06%	3 / 21	Marín
Esquerda Unida-SON	212	2.07%	0 / 17	Monforte de Lemos
GañaMos Asemblea Veciñal-SON	1954	22.77%	4 / 17	Mos
Esquerda Unida-SON	614	20.75%	3 / 13	Mugardos
Nigrán Decide-SON	880	10.1%	2 / 17	Nigrán
Son de Oroso-ANOVA	436	10.61%	1 / 13	Oroso
Son de Pereiro de Aguiar	278	8.06%	1 / 13	O Pereiro de Aguiar
Son de Trives	182	12.5%	1 / 11	A Pobra de Trives
Son de Poio	328	3.99%	0 / 17	Poio
Esquerda Unida-SON	586	5.26%	1 / 21	Ponteareas
Agrupación Pondaliana Independente-SON Ponteceso	481	13.98%	2 / 13	Ponteceso
Esquerda Unida-SON	697	6.79%	1 / 17	O Porriño
Son Redondela	320	2.01%	0 / 21	Redondela
Rianxo en Común-SON	695	11.04%	2 / 17	Rianxo
Son de Teo-ANOVA	3651	38.68%	7 / 17	Teo
Son de Toén-ANOVA	168	10.77%	1 / 11	Toén
Son de Tui	741	7.88%	1 / 17	Tui
Son de Val do Dubra-ANOVA	1048	43.2%	5 / 11	Val do Dubra
Son de Verín	311	4.46%	0 / 17	Verín
Marea de Vigo-SON	16227	11.5%	3 / 27	Vigo
Esquerda Unida-SON	2820	15.51%	3 / 21	Vilagarcía de Arousa
Son Viveiro	543	6.42%	1 / 17	Viveiro
