= Galician Convergence =

Galician Convergence Converxencia Galega
- Leader: Xoan Gato
- Founded: 2010
- Ideology: Galician nationalism Liberalism; Progressivism; Europeanism; Confederalism
- Political position: Centre
- Town councillors: 1 / 3,721

Website
- converxencia-galega.gal

Galician Convergence (Converxencia Galega in Galician language, CG) is a Galician political party with a moderate nationalist ideology, and which describes itself as centrist, socially progressive and economically liberal, europeanist, interclasisist and confederalist. CG was founded on 24 September 2010, in its first constituent congress in Santiago de Compostela. The party consists mostly of former militants of Terra Galega, after the split this party suffered in 2010. its president is Xoan Gato, President of the Chamber of Commerce of Ferrol.

== Local councils ==
Local councils
| Election | Spain | | | Galicia | | |
| Election | Votes | % | Seats won | Votes | % | Seats won |
| 2011 | 4,759 | 0.02 | 7 / 68,230 | 4,759 | 0.3 | 7 / 3,811 |
| 2015 | 2,901 | 0.01 | 7 / 67,515 | 2,901 | 0.2 | 7 / 3,766 |
| 2019 | 663 | 0.001 | 1 / 67,121 | 663 | 0.04 | 1 / 3,721 |
