= United Left (Galicia) =

United Left Esquerda Unida
- General Coordinator: Eva Solla
- Founded: 1986
- Merger of: Communist Party of Galicia; Esquerda Aberta; Communist Youth of Galicia; Independents; Communist Party of the Galician People (1986–1989); Socialist Action Party (1986–2001); Republican Left of Galicia (1986–2002)
- Membership (2015): ▲1,350
- Ideology: Socialism; Communism; Galicianism; Republicanism; Feminism
- Political position: Left-wing to far-left
- National affiliation: United Left
- Regional affiliation: Galician Left Alternative (2012–2016); En Marea (2015–2019); Galicia en Común (2019–2023); Sumar Galicia (since 2023)
- Colors: Red, Yellow, Purple
- Congreso de los Diputados: 1 / 23 (Galician seats)
- Spanish Senate: 0 / 19 (Galician seats)
- Galician Parliament: 0 / 75
- Mayors in Galicia (Note: As Esquerda Unida-Son in Mugardos and as a part of Cangas Left Alternative in Cangas.): 2 / 313

Website
- www.esquerdaunida.org

Esquerda Unida, EU (English: United Left) is the Galician federation of the Spanish left-wing political and social movement United Left. Eva Solla is the current General Coordinator. The PCG (Galician federation of PCE) is the major member of the coalition.

== History ==
For the 2012 Galician elections, EU was one of the leading members of the coalition Galician Left Alternative that became the third-biggest party in the Galician Parliament, winning 9 seats, 5 of which were members of EU.

== Current member parties ==
- Communist Party of Galicia
- Communist Youth of Galicia

== See also ==
- United Left (Spain)
- Galician Left Alternative
