= List of political parties in Galicia =

This article lists political parties in Galicia, Spain.

== Parties represented in the Galician Parliament ==
Party	Ideology	Votes	%	Seats	Status	Leader
People's Party of Galicia (PP)	Liberal conservatism Christian democracy	627,762	47.96%	42 / 75	Government	Alberto Núñez Feijóo
Galician Nationalist Bloc (BNG)	Galician separatism Socialism	311,340	23.79%	19 / 75	Opposition	Ana Pontón
Socialists' Party of Galicia (PSdeG-PSOE)	Social democracy	253,750	19.39%	14 / 75	Opposition	Gonzalo Caballero

== Parties without representation ==
Party	Ideology	Votes	%
Galicia in Common–Renewal–Tides (Podemos-EU-Anova)	Democratic socialism Left-wing populism	51,630	3.94%
Vox (VOX)	National conservatism Right-wing populism	26,797	2.05%
Citizens–Party of the Citizenry (Cs)	Liberalism	9,840	0.75%
Animalist Party Against Mistreatment of Animals (PACMA)	Animal rights	6,057	0.46%

=== Smaller parties ===
- Partido Galego (PG)
- Compromiso por Galicia (CxG)
- Equo Galicia (Equo)
- Communist Party of the Workers of Galicia (PCTG)
- Frente Obrero
- Zero Cuts–Common Space–The Greens–Municipalists (RC–EsCo–OV–M)
- For a Fairer World (PUM+J)
- Blank Seats (EB)

== List of political parties in Galicia ==
1. Alternativa Española (AES)
2. Falange Española de las J.O.N.S. (FE de las JONS)
3. Falange Auténtica (FA)
4. Democracia Nacional (DN)
5. Partido Obrero Socialista Internacionalista (POSI)
6. Partido Animalista Contra el Maltrato Animal (PACMA)
7. Os Verdes-Grupo Verde
8. Partido dos Socialistas de Galicia-Spanish Socialist Workers' Party
9. Bloque Nacionalista Galego (BNG)
10. Partido Galego (PG)
11. Solidaridad y Autogestión Internacionalista (SAIn)
12. Esquerda Unida (EU)
13. Asamblea De Votación Electronica (AVE)
14. Partido Popular de Galicia (PP)
15. Comunión Tradicionalista Carlista (CTC)
16. Partido Humanista de Galicia (PH)Unión do Povo Galego
17. Ciudadanos – Partido de la Ciudadanía (C's)
18. Por Un Mundo Más Justo (PUM+J)
19. Identidade Galega (IDEGA)
20. Unión Progreso y Democracia (UPyD)
21. Partido Familia y Vida (PFyV)
22. Terra Galega (TG)
23. Partido da Terra (PT)
24. Frente Popular Galega (FPG)
25. Nós-Unidade Popular (NOS-UP)
26. Unión do Povo Galego (UPG)
27. Assambleia da mocidade independentista (AMI)
28. Partido Galeguista (PG)
29. Converxencia nacionalista galega
30. Esquerda de Galicia (EG)
31. Alternativa dos veciños
32. Converxencia XXI (CXXI)
33. Galicianist Tide (En Marea–CxG–PGD)
34. Compromiso por Galicia (CxG)
35. Partido Galeguista Demócrata (PGD)
