= 2020 Galician regional election =

Election in the Spanish region of Galicia

- 12 July 2020

All 75 seats in the Parliament of Galicia 38 seats needed for a majority
- Opinion polls
- Registered: 2,697,490 ▼0.2%
- Turnout: 1,320,955 (49.0%) ▼4.6 pp
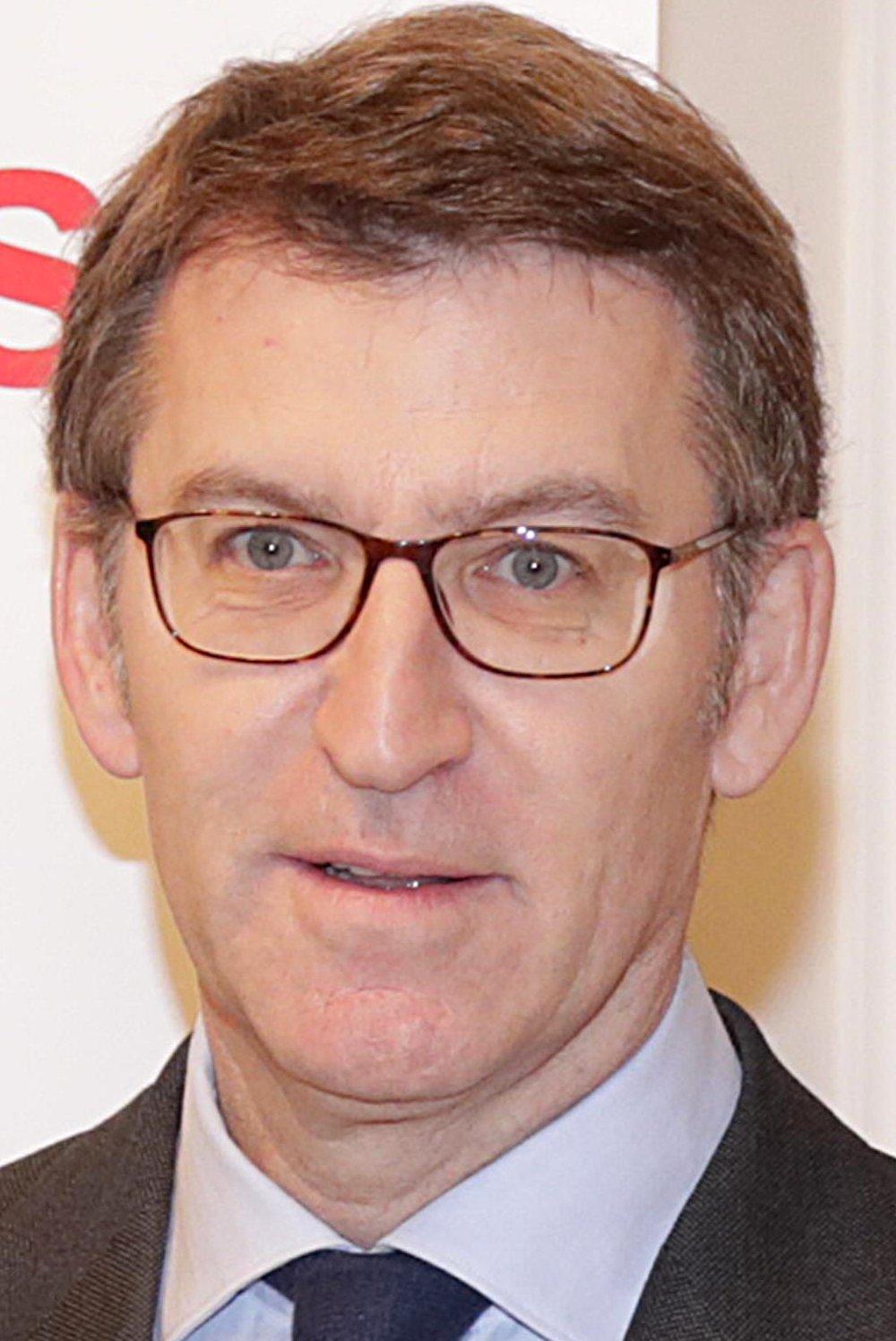

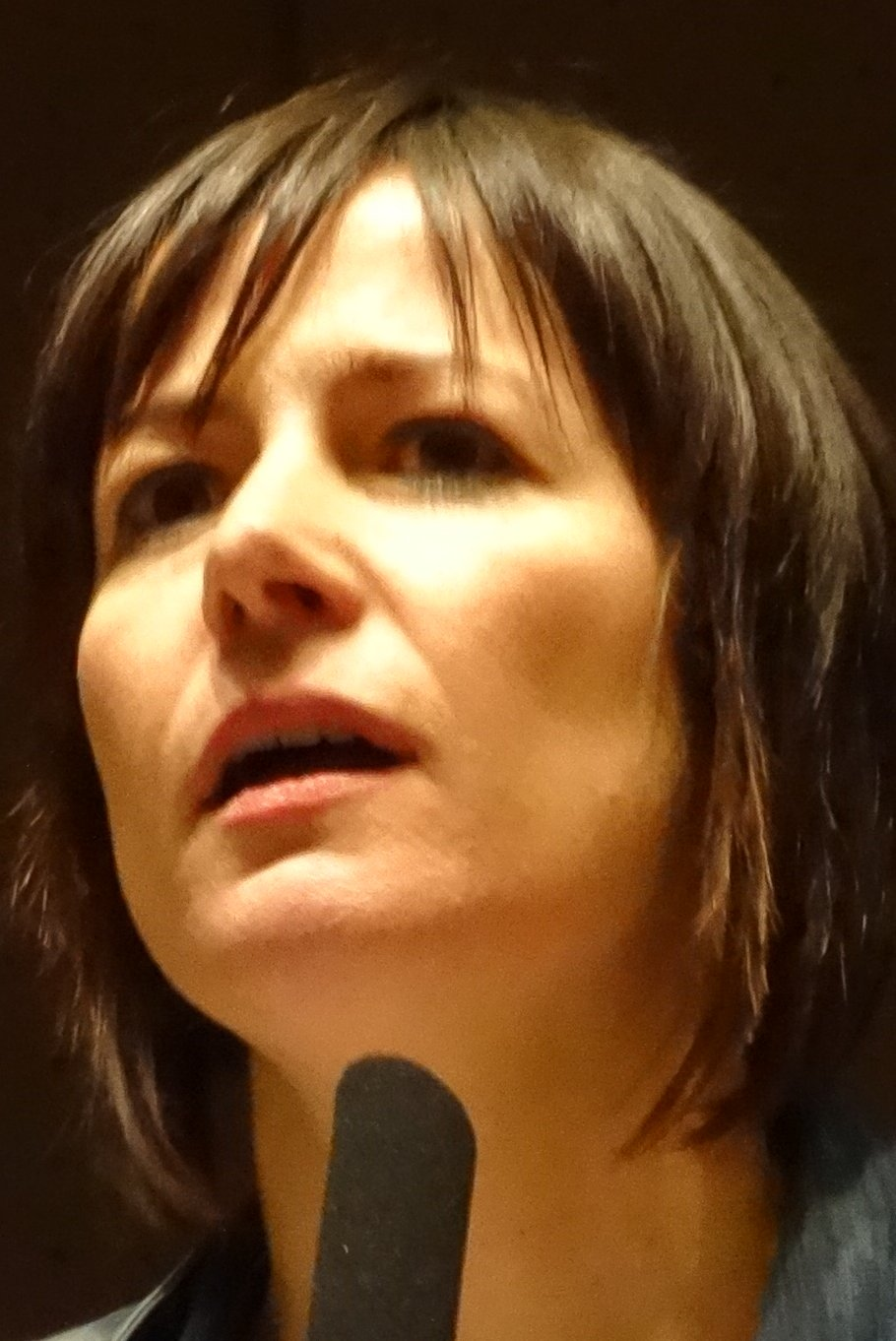

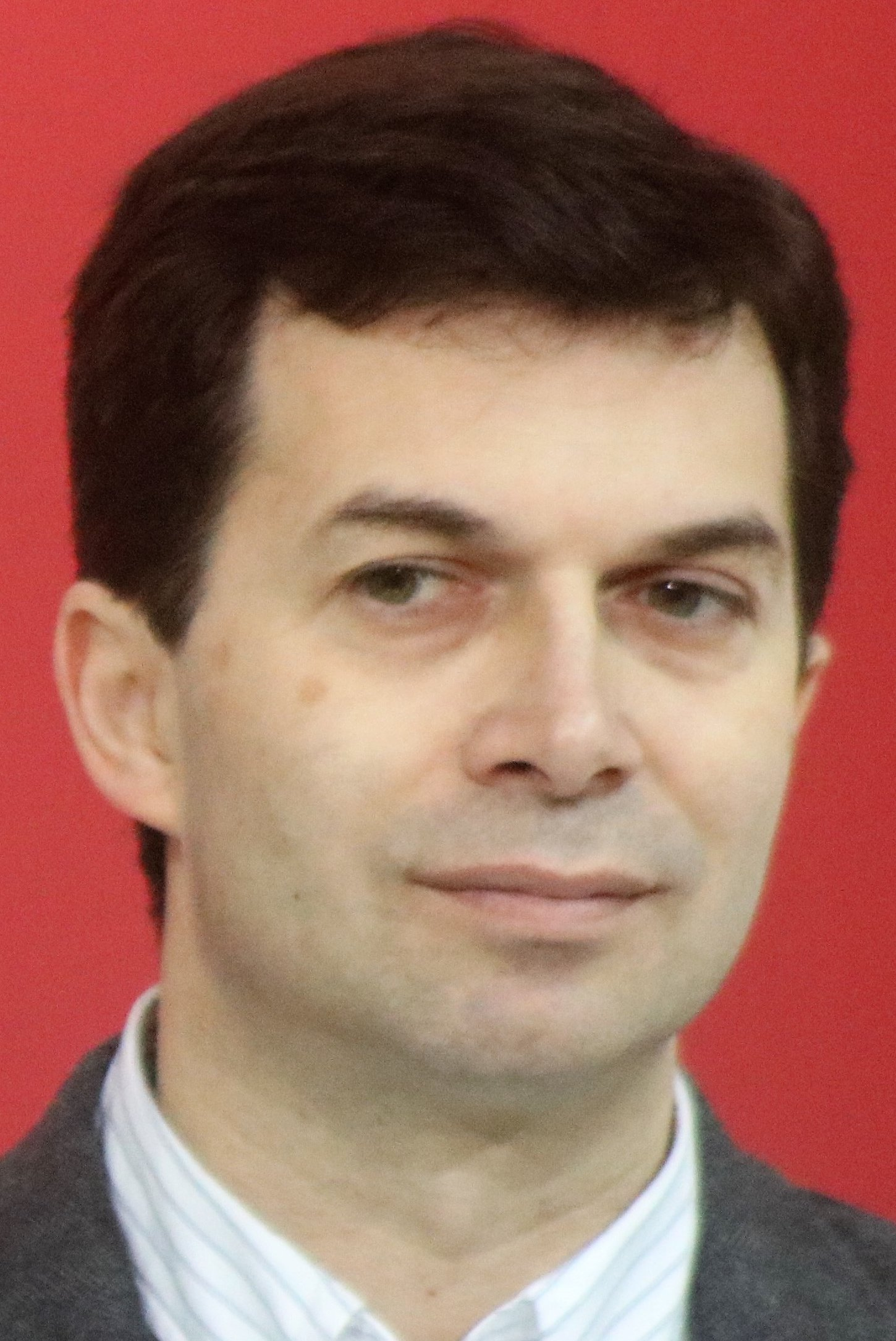
	First party	Second party	Third party
Leader	Alberto Núñez Feijóo	Ana Pontón	Gonzalo Caballero
Party	PP	BNG	PSdeG–PSOE
Leader since	15 January 2006	28 February 2016	8 October 2017
Leader's seat	Pontevedra	A Coruña	Pontevedra
Last election	41 seats, 47.6%	6 seats, 8.3%	14 seats, 17.9%
Seats won	42	19	14
Seat change	▲1	▲13	0
Popular vote	627,762	311,340	253,750
Percentage	48.0%	23.8%	19.4%
Swing	▲0.4 pp	▲15.5 pp	▲1.5 pp
- Constituency results map for the Parliament of Galicia
President before election
Alberto Núñez Feijóo
PP
President after election
Alberto Núñez Feijóo
PP

A regional election was held in Galicia on 12 July 2020 to elect the 11th Parliament of the autonomous community. All 75 seats in the Parliament were up for election. It was held concurrently with a regional election in the Basque Country. The election was initially scheduled for 5 April 2020 but was postponed as a result of the COVID-19 pandemic.

In early February 2020, concerns about a possible snap election in the Basque Country to be called for 5 April raised speculation on whether regional president Alberto Núñez Feijóo would be willing to advance the Galician regional election to be held concurrently with the Basque one, as had happened in 2009, 2012 and 2016, despite Feijóo's earlier claims that his will was against bringing about a premature end to the legislature. On 10 February, Lehendakari Iñigo Urkullu's confirmation of a Basque election for 5 April prompted Feijóo to precipitate the end of the Galician legislature and announce a regional election for the same day. However, on 16 March it was announced that the vote would be postponed for the duration of the COVID-19 pandemic in Spain, shortly after Prime Minister Pedro Sánchez's declaration of a nationwide lockdown in the country starting on the previous day.

Feijóo's ruling People's Party (PP) maintained its dominance at the regional level, maintaining its vote share and seat count from the 2016 election. The Galician Nationalist Bloc (BNG) picked up the vast majority of losses from Galicia in Common–Renewal–Tides (GeC–AM), the successor alliance to En Marea after several party splits, seeing their results spike by over 15% to second place of the vote and seeing their seat count increase by 13 to their best result since 1997. The Socialists' Party of Galicia (PSdeG–PSOE) remained in third place, neither gaining nor losing any seats compared to the previous election. Support for GeC–AM plummeted in comparison to En Marea's results in 2016, failing to cross the electoral threshold and losing all 14 of the seats they held prior to the vote. The far-right Vox, which had seen a rise in support in the region during the November 2019 general election, failed to cross the electoral threshold and suffered from tactical voting to Feijóo's PP.

== Background ==
A vote of no confidence in June 2018 had seen the downfall of Prime Minister Mariano Rajoy, of Galician descent, and his succession by Pedro Sánchez from the Spanish Socialist Workers' Party (PSOE). After eight convoluted months in which the PSOE had led a very precarious minority government, Sánchez called a general election for 28 April 2019, in which the People's Party (PP) did not come out in top place in Galicia for the first time in history, with the party having won all previous elections—general, local, European and regional—since its inception in 1989. The local and European Parliament elections held on 26 May 2019 saw the PSOE's local branch, the Socialists' Party of Galicia (PSdeG), sweeping across the region and winning control of all main Galician cities but Pontevedra and Ourense: A Coruña, Ferrol, Lugo, Santiago de Compostela and Vigo, the latter seeing an humiliating defeat for Galician president Alberto Núñez Feijóo after his local candidate scored a bare 13% of the vote to the PSdeG of incumbent mayor Abel Caballero's 67%. The electoral victories of 2019 and the weaknesses of the ruling PP after eleven years in the Xunta de Galicia prompted prospects of the PSdeG being returned to the regional government under the leadership of Gonzalo Caballero, nephew of Vigo's mayor.

Concurrently, the political space held by the En Marea party had broken up after internal disputes. In late 2018, a crisis concerning the election of a new party leadership resulted in a split between members supporting Luis Villares and En Marea's founding member parties, Podemos, Renewal–Nationalist Brotherhood (Anova) and United Left (EU). Villares was elected as new En Marea leader on 24 December 2018 amid accusations of fraud and vote rigging, prompting Podemos, Anova and EU to withdraw from En Marea, dubbing it as a "failed" political project. Podemos and EU would contest both the April and the November 2019 general elections under the En Común–Unidas Podemos brand, forming the Galicia en Común sub-group within Unidas Podemos in the Congress of Deputies. In September 2019, legislators from Podemos, Anova and EU formed the Grupo Común da Esquerda in the Parliament of Galicia, forcing En Marea loyalists into the Mixed Group.

== Overview ==
Under the 1981 Statute of Autonomy, the Parliament of Galicia was the unicameral legislature of the homonymous autonomous community, having legislative power in devolved matters, as well as the ability to grant or withdraw confidence from a regional president. The electoral and procedural rules were supplemented by national law provisions.

=== Date ===
The term of the Parliament of Galicia expired four years after the date of its previous election, unless it was dissolved earlier. The election decree was required to be issued no later than 25 days before the scheduled expiration date of parliament and published on the following day in the Official Journal of Galicia (DOG), with election day taking place 54 days after the decree's publication. The previous election was held on 25 September 2016, which meant that the chamber's term would have expired on 25 September 2020. The election decree was required to be published in the DOG no later than 1 September 2020, setting the latest possible date for election day on 25 October 2020.

The regional president had the prerogative to dissolve the Parliament of Galicia at any given time and call a snap election, provided that it did not occur before one year after a previous one under this procedure. In the event of an investiture process failing to elect a regional president within a two-month period from the first ballot, the Parliament was to be automatically dissolved and a fresh election called.

The decision of Catalan president Quim Torra on 29 January 2020 to announce a snap Catalan regional election to be held at some point throughout 2020 was said to have raised concerns within the Basque government of Lehendakari Iñigo Urkullu, whose party, the Basque Nationalist Party (PNV), sought to prevent the next Basque regional election—which was due by autumn of 2020 at the latest—from being held simultaneously to prevent any interference from the Catalan political debate into the Basque campaign. This in turn increased pressure on Galician president Alberto Núñez Feijóo to unveil the Galician election date, with speculation mounting on whether he would coordinate the electoral timing with that of a hypothetical snap Basque election—as had happened in 2009, 2012 and 2016—or would let the legislature reach its natural end, thus bringing the election to the autumn of 2020.

Asked on the issue on 7 February, Feijóo did not rule out a simultaneous call with the Basque election, but vindicated that the autonomy of adopting such a decision was "his" and that he would not be discussing hypothetical scenarios—on the possibility of Urkullu announcing a snap election within the next few days—until they happened. La Vanguardia reported on 9 February that Feijóo could be interested in waiting for an autumn election to be held concurrently with the Catalan one, at a time when he had not yet revealed whether he would be running for a fourth time in office. On 10 February, Urkullu confirmed the Basque election for 5 April, with Feijóo commenting that he would be making a choice on the date of the Galician election "immediately" but that it would not be affected by Urkullu's decision. In response to the Basque announcement, Feijóo summoned his government to an urgency meeting later in the same day and decided to trigger a snap election to be held simultaneously on 5 April.

The Parliament of Galicia was officially dissolved on 11 February 2020 with the publication of the corresponding decree in the DOG. As a result of the COVID-19 pandemic, the election's original date was suspended on 18 March, with it being rescheduled for 12 July 2020 on 18 May after the easing of virus spreading conditions and a reduction in the infection rate, resulting in the lockdown established by the state of alarm lasting from 15 March to 21 June. The date for the reconvening of the chamber was set for 7 August.

=== Electoral system ===
Voting for the Parliament was based on universal suffrage, comprising all Spanish nationals over 18 years of age, registered in Galicia and with full political rights, provided that they had not been deprived of the right to vote by a final sentence. (Note: Amendments in 2018 granted the right to vote to those legally incapacitated.) Additionally, non-resident citizens were required to apply for voting, a system known as "begged" voting (Spanish: Voto rogado).

The Parliament of Galicia had a minimum of 60 and a maximum of 80 seats, with electoral provisions fixing its size at 75. All were elected in four multi-member constituencies—corresponding to the provinces of A Coruña, Lugo, Ourense and Pontevedra, each of which was assigned an initial minimum of 10 seats and the remaining 35 distributed in proportion to population—using the D'Hondt method and closed-list proportional voting, with a five percent-threshold of valid votes (including blank ballots) in each constituency. The use of this electoral method resulted in a higher effective threshold depending on district magnitude and vote distribution.

As a result of the aforementioned allocation, each Parliament constituency was entitled the following seats:

Seats	Constituencies
25	A Coruña
22	Pontevedra
14	Lugo, Ourense

The law did not provide for by-elections to fill vacant seats; instead, any vacancies arising after the proclamation of candidates and during the legislative term were filled by the next candidates on the party lists or, when required, by designated substitutes.

=== Outgoing parliament ===
The table below shows the composition of the parliamentary groups in the chamber at the time of dissolution.

Parliamentary composition in February 2020
Groups	Parties	Legislators	
Groups	Parties	Seats	Total
People's Parliamentary Group of Galicia	PP	41	41
Socialists of Galicia's Parliamentary Group	PSdeG–PSOE	14	14
Common Group of the Left; Parliamentary Group	Podemos	6	9
Common Group of the Left; Parliamentary Group	EU	1	9
Common Group of the Left; Parliamentary Group	Anova	1	9
Common Group of the Left; Parliamentary Group	MA	1	9
Galician Nationalist Bloc's Parliamentary Group	BNG	6	6
Mixed Parliamentary Group	En Marea	5	5

== Parties and candidates ==
The electoral law allowed for parties and federations registered in the interior ministry, alliances and groupings of electors to present lists of candidates. Parties and federations intending to form an alliance were required to inform the relevant electoral commission within 10 days of the election call, whereas groupings of electors needed to secure the signature of at least one percent of the electorate in the constituencies for which they sought election, disallowing electors from signing for more than one list. Additionally, a balanced composition of men and women was required in the electoral lists, so that candidates of either sex made up at least 40 percent of the total composition.

Below is a list of the main parties and alliances which contested the election:

Candidacy	Parties and alliances	Leading candidate	Ideology	Previous result		Gov.	Ref.
Candidacy	Parties and alliances	Leading candidate	Ideology	Vote %	Seats	Gov.	Ref.
PP	List: People's Party (PP)	Alberto Núñez Feijóo	Conservatism; Christian democracy	47.6%	41	Yes	
GeC–AM	List: We Can (Podemos); United Left (EU) – Communist Party of Galicia (PCG) – The Dawn Marxist Organization (La Aurora (OM)) – Republican Left (IR); Renewal–Nationalist Brotherhood (Anova) – Irmandiño Meeting (EI) – Galician People's Front (FPG) – Movement for the Grassroots (MpB); Atlantic Tide (Marea Atlántica); Open Compostela (CA)	Antón Gómez-Reino	Left-wing populism Direct democracy Democratic socialism	19.1% (Note: Results for En Marea in the 2016 election.)	14	No	
PSdeG– PSOE	List: Socialists' Party of Galicia (PSdeG–PSOE)	Gonzalo Caballero	Social democracy	17.9%	14	No	
BNG	List: Galician Nationalist Bloc (BNG) – Galician People's Union (UPG) – Galician Movement for Socialism (MGS) – Abrente–Galician Democratic Left (Abrente–EDG) – Galician Workers' Front (FOGA)	Ana Pontón	Galician nationalism Left-wing nationalism Socialism	8.3%	6	No	
Cs	List: Citizens–Party of the Citizenry (Cs)	Beatriz Pino	Liberalism	3.4%	0	No	
MG	List: In Tide (En Marea); Commitment to Galicia (CxG); Galicianist Party (PG)	Pancho Casal	Galician nationalism Democratic socialism	0.3% (Note: Results for CxG in the 2016 election.)	0	No	
Vox	List: Vox (Vox)	None (Note: Vox did not field a single candidate for the post of president of the Regional Government of Galicia.)	Right-wing populism Ultranationalism; National conservatism	Did not contest		No	

On 11 February Gonzalo Pérez Jácome, leader of the Ourensan Democracy (DO) party—which secured 4.4% of the vote in the Ourense province in the 2016 election—and mayor of Ourense with PP support, announced that he would be voting for Feijóo amid speculation that DO would be joining PP's electoral lists ahead of the regional election. An electoral alliance with Citizens was proposed by Cs spokesperson Inés Arrimadas but was rejected by Feijóo.

En Marea leader Luis Villares announced on 19 February his farewell from politics and his return to his judge post, casting doubt about En Marea's fate in the election ahead and whether the party would end up running in the election or withdrawing from the electoral contest. After the election was suspended and rescheduled for 12 July, the party announced that it would be contesting within the Marea Galeguista alliance together with Commitment to Galicia (CxG) and the Galicianist Party (PG).

== Campaign ==
=== Timetable ===
The key dates are listed below (all times are CET):

- 10 February: The election decree is issued with the countersign of the president, after deliberation in the Council of Government.
- 11 February: Formal dissolution of parliament.
- 18 March: Election postponement due to the COVID-19 pandemic; all election procedures and preparations are suspended until further notice.
- 18 May: The election decree is newly issued with the countersign of the president, after deliberation in the Council of Government.
- 19 May: Start of prohibition period on the inauguration of public works, services or projects.
- 22 May: Initial constitution of provincial and zone electoral commissions with judicial members.
- 25 May: Division of constituencies into polling sections and stations.
- 29 May: Deadline for parties and federations to report on their electoral alliances.
- 1 June: Deadline for electoral register consultation for the purpose of possible corrections.
- 8 June: Deadline for parties, federations, alliances, and groupings of electors to present electoral lists.
- 10 June: Publication of submitted electoral lists in the Official Journal of Galicia (DOG).
- 13 June: Deadline for non-resident citizens (electors residing abroad (CERA) and citizens temporarily absent from Spain) to apply for voting.
- 15 June: Official proclamation of validly submitted electoral lists.
- 16 June: Publication of proclaimed electoral lists in the DOG.
- 17 June: Deadline for the selection of polling station members by sortition.
- 25 June: Deadline for the appointment of non-judicial members to provincial and zone electoral commissions.
- 26 June: Official start of electoral campaigning.
- 2 July: Deadline to apply for postal voting.
- 7 July: Start of legal ban on electoral opinion polling publication; deadline for CERA citizens to vote by mail.
- 8 July: Deadline for postal and temporarily absent voting.
- 10 July: Last day of electoral campaigning; deadline for CERA voting.
- 11 July: Official election silence ("reflection day").
- 12 July: Election day (polling stations open at 9 am and close at 8 pm or once voters present in a queue at/outside the polling station at 8 pm have cast their vote); provisional vote counting.
- 20 July: General counting of votes, including the counting of CERA votes.
- 23 July: Deadline for the general vote counting.
- 1 August: Deadline for the proclamation of elected members.
- 12 August: Deadline for the reconvening of parliament (date determined by the election decree, which for the 2020 election was set for 7 August).
- 10 September: Final deadline for definitive results to be published in the DOG.

=== Party slogans ===
Party or alliance	Original slogan (Note: The crossed-out slogans depicted below are the ones proposed for the 5 April election before its postponement.)	English translation	Ref.
PP	~~« Galicia é moito »~~ « Galicia, Galicia, Galicia »	~~« Galicia means a lot »~~ "Galicia, Galicia, Galicia"	
PSdeG–PSOE	~~« A hora do cambio »~~ « Faino por Galicia. Faino por ti »	~~"Time for change"~~ "Do it for Galicia. Do it for you"	
GeC–AM	~~« Gobernar e transformar Galicia »~~ « É o momento! Construírmos o futuro »	~~« Governing and transforming Galicia »~~ "It's time! Building the future"	
BNG	~~« Galiza en marchA! »~~ « Unha nova GalizA! »	~~"Galicia on the move!"~~ "A new Galicia!"	
MG	« Fagámolo »	"Let's do it"	
Cs	« Moito que gañar »	"A lot to gain"	
Vox	« Galicia es verde »	"Galicia is green"	

=== Debates ===
2020 Galician regional election debates
Date	Organizer(s)	Moderator(s)	P Present (Note: Denotes a main invitee attending the event.) S Surrogate (Note: Denotes a main invitee not attending the event, sending a surrogate in their place.)								
Date	Organizer(s)	Moderator(s)	PP	PSdeG	GeC–AM	BNG	MG	Cs	Vox	Audience	Ref.
29 June	TVG	Marta Darriba; Alejandro López	P Feijóo	P Caballero	P G.Reino	P Pontón	P Casal	P Pino	S Morado	15.8%(127,000)	

== Opinion polls ==
The tables below list opinion polling results in reverse chronological order, showing the most recent first and using the dates when the survey fieldwork was done, as opposed to the date of publication. Where the fieldwork dates are unknown, the date of publication is given instead. The highest percentage figure in each polling survey is displayed with its background shaded in the leading party's colour. If a tie ensues, this is applied to the figures with the highest percentages. The "Lead" column on the right shows the percentage-point difference between the parties with the highest percentages in a poll.

=== Graphical summary ===
Local regression trend line of poll results from 25 September 2016 to 12 July 2020, with each line corresponding to a political party.

=== Voting intention estimates ===
The table below lists weighted voting intention estimates. Refusals are generally excluded from the party vote percentages, while question wording and the treatment of "don't know" responses and those not intending to vote may vary between polling organisations. When available, seat projections determined by the polling organisations are displayed below (or in place of) the percentages in a smaller font; 38 seats were required for an absolute majority in the Parliament of Galicia.

Color key:

Poll conducted after legal ban on opinion polls Exit poll

Polling firm/Commissioner	Fieldwork date	Sample size	Turnout	PP	En Marea	PSdeG–PSOE	BNG	Cs	Galicia en Común	Vox	PP+Cs	Marea Galeguista	Lead
2020 regional election	12 Jul 2020	—N/a	49.0	48.0; 42	(Note: Within Marea Galeguista.)	19.4; 14	23.8; 19	0.8; 0	3.9; 0	2.0; 0	–	0.2; 0	24.2
GfK/CRTVG	12 Jul 2020	15,800	?	44.7; 37/40		15.9; 12/14	25.9; 19/22	0.9; 0	5.7; 2	2.0; 0	–	1.6; 0	18.8
Celeste-Tel/eldiario.es	1–12 Jul 2020	1,100	55.5	48.5; 41/42		19.4; 16	19.0; 15/16	? 0	5.9; 2/3	? 0	–	? 0	29.1
Sondaxe/La Voz de Galicia	8–11 Jul 2020	1,200	?	? 42		? 14	? 15	? 0	? 4	? 0	–	? 0	?
ElectoPanel/Electomanía	10 Jul 2020	2,000	?	48.4; 42		19.6; 15	18.6; 15	1.5; 0	6.6; 3	2.6; 0	–	0.7; 0	28.8
Sondaxe/La Voz de Galicia	7–10 Jul 2020	1,200	?	? 41		? 14	? 15	? 0	? 5	? 0	–	? 0	?
GAD3/ABC	29 Jun–10 Jul 2020	1,459	?	47.9; 40/42		19.9; 16	21.5; 16/18	? 0	4.3; 0/2	? 0	–	? 0	26.4
ElectoPanel/Electomanía	9 Jul 2020	2,000	?	48.5; 42		19.6; 15	18.5; 15	1.4; 0	6.4; 3	2.4; 0	–	0.7; 0	28.9
Sondaxe/La Voz de Galicia	6–9 Jul 2020	1,200	?	? 42		? 14	? 14	? 0	? 5	? 0	–	? 0	?
ElectoPanel/Electomanía	8 Jul 2020	2,000	?	48.2; 42		19.8; 16	18.2; 14	1.5; 0	6.5; 3	2.7; 0	–	0.7; 0	28.4
Sondaxe/La Voz de Galicia	5–8 Jul 2020	1,200	?	? 41		? 16	? 13	? 0	? 5	? 0	–	? 0	?
ElectoPanel/Electomanía	7 Jul 2020	2,000	?	47.8; 42		19.7; 16	17.9; 14	1.8; 0	6.8; 3	2.9; 0	–	0.8; 0	28.1
Sondaxe/La Voz de Galicia	4–7 Jul 2020	1,200	?	? 42		? 15	? 13	? 0	? 5	? 0	–	? 0	?
ElectoPanel/Electomanía	6 Jul 2020	2,000	?	47.7; 42		19.5; 16	17.6; 13	1.9; 0	7.2; 4	2.8; 0	–	1.3; 0	28.2
KeyData/Público	6 Jul 2020	?	59.0	47.9; 41		20.3; 16	17.4; 13	1.3; 0	7.8; 5	2.5; 0	–	1.5; 0	27.6
Sondaxe/La Voz de Galicia	3–6 Jul 2020	1,200	?	? 42		? 15	? 14	? 0	? 4	? 0	–	? 0	?
Demoscopia y Servicios/ESdiario	3–5 Jul 2020	1,000	56.0	48.5; 42		20.5; 16	18.1; 13	0.7; 0	7.5; 4	1.4; 0	–	0.9; 0	28.0
Sondaxe/La Voz de Galicia	2–5 Jul 2020	1,200	?	? 42		? 15	? 14	? 0	? 4	? 0	–	? 0	?
SocioMétrica/El Español	15 Jun–5 Jul 2020	2,100	?	47.3; 41/43		17.3; 12/15	16.8; 12/14	1.9; 0	9.1; 5/7	3.1; 0/1	–	–	30.0
Sondaxe/La Voz de Galicia	1–4 Jul 2020	1,200	58.7	47.9; 40		19.0; 15	18.4; 15	0.8; 0	8.2; 5	1.0; 0	–	2.0; 0	28.9
ElectoPanel/Electomanía	3 Jul 2020	2,000	44.1 (Note: Widespread fear to coronavirus pandemic-scenario.)	44.6		18.9	20.2	2.4	8.5	2.8	–	–	24.4
ElectoPanel/Electomanía	3 Jul 2020	2,000	59.5 (Note: Main scenario.)	47.9; 42		20.3; 16	16.8; 13	2.1; 0	7.5; 4	2.3; 0	–	1.5; 0	27.6
Sondaxe/La Voz de Galicia	30 Jun–3 Jul 2020	1,200	58.4	48.4; 42		18.1; 14	17.9; 13	0.6; 0	9.2; 6	1.3; 0	–	2.5; 0	30.3
NC Report/La Razón	29 Jun–3 Jul 2020	1,000	51.0	48.1; 41/42		20.4; 16/18	17.0; 12/14	2.0; 0	6.8; 3/4	2.4; 0	–	1.6; 0	27.7
Celeste-Tel/eldiario.es	25 Jun–3 Jul 2020	1,100	51.7	47.4; 41/42		21.4; 16/17	16.3; 13	1.8; 0	7.4; 4	2.6; 0	–	1.3; 0	26.0
Sigma Dos/El Mundo	30 Jun–2 Jul 2020	1,000	?	48.1; 40/41		19.6; 16/17	19.2; 13/15	1.0; 0	8.4; 4/5	2.0; 0	–	–	28.5
Sondaxe/La Voz de Galicia	29 Jun–2 Jul 2020	1,200	58.1	48.2; 42		17.7; 13	17.2; 13	? 0	9.6; 7	? 0	–	4.2; 0	30.5
GAD3/ABC	22 Jun–2 Jul 2020	986	59	49.9; 43		20.9; 16	18.6; 14	1.0; 0	4.9; 2	1.2; 0	–	–	29.0
Infortécnica/Atlántico	18 Jun–2 Jul 2020	1,252	?	? 40/43		? 19/21	? 9/12	–	? 4	? 0/1	–	–	?
Sondaxe/La Voz de Galicia	28 Jun–1 Jul 2020	1,200	57.8	47.7; 42		17.8; 14	16.4; 13	? 0	9.7; 6	? 0	–	? 0	29.9
Hamalgama Métrica/Okdiario	22 Jun–1 Jul 2020	1,000	?	48.0; 42		20.9; 17	15.9; 13	1.3; 0	7.1; 3	3.0; 0	–	–	27.1
ElectoPanel/Electomanía	30 Jun 2020	2,000	?	47.7; 42		20.5; 16	17.1; 13	2.5; 0	7.5; 4	2.2; 0	–	1.1; 0	27.2
Sondaxe/La Voz de Galicia	27–30 Jun 2020	1,200	56.9	48.1; 42		17.8; 14	16.3; 13	? 0	9.6; 6	? 0	–	3.0; 0	30.3
40dB/El País	19–30 Jun 2020	1,200	?	47.5; 39/43		19.7; 15/16	18.4; 13/15	0.8; 0	8.0; 4/5	1.2; 0	–	1.2; 0	27.8
Sondaxe/La Voz de Galicia	26–29 Jun 2020	1,200	60.1	47.3; 41		18.3; 14	16.9; 14	? 0	8.7; 6	? 0	–	? 0	29.0
GESOP/Faro de Vigo	18–29 Jun 2020	1,503	57–59	48.5; 41/43		20.4; 15/17	18.7; 14/16	0.2; 0	5.1; 2	0.9; 0	–	0.5; 0	28.1
Sondaxe/La Voz de Galicia	25–28 Jun 2020	1,200	58.7	47.1; 41		19.1; 15	17.1; 14	0.7; 0	8.3; 5	0.8; 0	–	1.1; 0	28.0
Sigma Dos/Antena 3	27 Jun 2020	?	?	48.3; 40/42		23.1; 17/19	17.0; 12/13	1.1; 0	6.4; 3	2.0; 0	–	–	25.2
Sondaxe/La Voz de Galicia	24–27 Jun 2020	1,200	60.8	47.6; 42		18.7; 14	17.0; 13	? 0	9.1; 6	? 0	–	? 0	28.9
ElectoPanel/Electomanía	26 Jun 2020	2,000	?	47.4; 42		21.2; 16	16.0; 13	1.9; 0	8.0; 4	2.6; 0	–	1.2; 0	26.2
Sondaxe/La Voz de Galicia	23–26 Jun 2020	1,200	62.9	48.0; 42		18.9; 14	16.9; 13	? 0	9.9; 6	1.5; 0	–	? 0	29.1
Sondaxe/La Voz de Galicia	22–25 Jun 2020	1,200	61.5	47.5; 42		19.0; 14	17.3; 13	? 0	10.2; 6	? 0	–	? 0	28.5
Sondaxe/La Voz de Galicia	21–24 Jun 2020	1,200	58.9	47.9; 41		19.2; 15	16.6; 13	1.2; 0	10.1; 6	1.2; 0	–	2.1; 0	28.7
ElectoPanel/Electomanía	23 Jun 2020	2,000	?	46.3; 40		22.0; 18	16.0; 12	2.1; 0	8.4; 5	2.7; 0	–	0.8; 0	24.3
Sondaxe/La Voz de Galicia	20–23 Jun 2020	1,200	59.6	47.3; 41		20.2; 15	16.2; 13	? 0	10.4; 6	? 0	–	? 0	27.1
NC Report/La Razón	15–23 Jun 2020	1,200	51.3	46.3; 40/41		22.3; 18/19	15.9; 11/12	1.7; 0	7.8; 5/6	2.9; 0	–	1.5; 0	24.0
Sondaxe/La Voz de Galicia	19–22 Jun 2020	1,200	52.2	47.5; 40		20.1; 15	16.3; 13	<1.0; 0	10.6; 7	<1.0; 0	–	2.3; 0	27.4
Sondaxe/La Voz de Galicia	18–21 Jun 2020	1,200	58.8	47.2; 41		20.5; 16	15.2; 12	? 0	10.3; 6	? 0	–	? 0	26.7
Sondaxe/La Voz de Galicia	17–20 Jun 2020	1,200	59.6	46.7; 41		21.3; 15	15.2; 12	? 0	10.4; 7	? 0	–	? 0	25.4
ElectoPanel/Electomanía	19 Jun 2020	2,000	?	45.8; 41		22.8; 19	16.0; 11	1.9; 0	8.0; 4	2.9; 0	–	0.9; 0	23.0
Sondaxe/La Voz de Galicia	15–19 Jun 2020	1,200	59.1	47.1; 40		20.6; 16	14.4; 11	? 0	10.5; 8	? 0	–	? 0	26.5
CIS	10–19 Jun 2020	3,398	?	46.0; 40/42		19.5; 16/18	16.8; 12/14	2.2; 0	7.2; 4/6	1.4; 0	–	2.9; 0	26.5
Infortécnica/Atlántico	8–18 Jun 2020	1,290	?	? 39/43		? 21/24	? 8/9	? 0/1	? 3/4	? 0/1	–	? 0/1	?
SyM Consulting	15–17 Jun 2020	2,519	67.0	47.2; 39/42		20.1; 16/18	13.5; 9/11	2.2; 0	10.1; 7/8	2.5; 0	–	1.8; 0	27.1
ElectoPanel/Electomanía	16 Jun 2020	2,000	?	46.6; 41		21.7; 18	15.9; 12	1.7; 0	8.4; 4	2.9; 0	–	1.1; 0	24.9
ElectoPanel/Electomanía	12 Jun 2020	2,000	?	47.4; 43		21.7; 17	15.5; 11	1.2; 0	8.3; 4	3.0; 0	–	1.2; 0	25.7
KeyData/Público	7 Jun 2020	?	64.5	46.6; 40	–	21.7; 18	15.4; 11	1.6; 0	8.4; 6	3.0; 0	–	–	24.9
Infortécnica/Atlántico	1–5 Jun 2020	1,248	?	? 40/43	–	? 21/23	? 8/10	? 0	? 2/4	? 0	–	–	?
Sondaxe/La Voz de Galicia	30 May–4 Jun 2020	1,000	65.2	46.2; 40		19.6; 17	15.1; 12	2.4; 0	9.6; 6	1.7; 0	–	2.2; 0	26.6
Celeste-Tel/eldiario.es	25–29 May 2020	1,100	?	45.8; 38/39	–	23.2; 19/20	14.6; 11	1.5; 0	9.3; 6	2.9; 0	–	–	22.6
GAD3/ABC	21–26 May 2020	804	60	48.5; 42/43	–	21.6; 16/19	15.7; 11/13	1.5; 0	6.6; 2/4	2.5; 0	–	–	26.9
NC Report/La Razón	18–23 May 2020	1,000	50.2	46.2; 39/40	–	22.8; 18/19	15.9; 11	1.2; 0	7.6; 6	3.5; 0	–	–	23.4
ElectoPanel/Electomanía	1 Apr–15 May 2020	?	?	48.0; 41	–	22.6; 19	15.3; 11	0.8; 0	8.4; 4	3.1; 0	–	–	25.4
NC Report/La Razón	3–8 Apr 2020	1,000	?	44.2; 37/38	–	24.3; 20/21	14.9; 11	1.0; 0	7.4; 5/6	4.9; 0/1	–	–	19.9
ElectoPanel/Electomanía	5 Apr 2020	1,000	?	48.9; 44	–	20.9; 16	15.9; 11	1.2; 0	8.9; 4	2.4; 0	–	–	28.0
Infortécnica/El Progreso	11–19 Mar 2020	1,041	?	? 39/42	–	? 17/20	? 11/12	? 0	? 4/8	? 0	–	–	?
Sondaxe/La Voz de Galicia	10–13 Mar 2020	1,200	?	49.2; 41	–	19.8; 16	15.1; 11	1.1; 0	10.3; 7	1.1; 0	–	–	29.4
Infortécnica/Atlántico	4–12 Mar 2020	1,420	?	? 40/42	–	? 15/17	? 10/11	? 0/1	? 7/8	? 0/1	–	–	?
ElectoPanel/Electomanía	6–8 Mar 2020	1,000	?	44.0; 38	–	23.4; 19	17.1; 13	1.2; 0	8.5; 5	3.6; 0	–	–	20.6
Sigma Dos/El Mundo	2–5 Mar 2020	1,000	?	45.9; 38/40	–	24.1; 19/21	17.5; 12/13	1.3; 0	6.9; 3/5	1.8; 0	–	–	21.8
ElectoPanel/Electomanía	2–5 Mar 2020	1,000	?	44.1; 38	–	23.5; 19	17.0; 13	1.3; 0	8.5; 5	3.6; 0	–	–	20.6
Infortécnica/Atlántico	27 Feb–5 Mar 2020	1,466	?	? 40/42	–	? 13/14	? 7/9	? 0/2	? 11/13	? 0/2	–	–	?
NC Report/La Razón	19 Feb–4 Mar 2020	1,000	53.2	43.7; 37	–	24.7; 20/21	15.1; 11	1.3; 0	7.9; 6	4.8; 0/1	–	–	19.0
GAD3/ABC	26 Feb–2 Mar 2020	800	?	44.7; 38/40	–	23.2; 18/20	18.3; 13/14	1.9; 0	7.0; 3/4	2.5; 0	–	–	21.5
Sigma Dos/Antena 3	1 Mar 2020	?	?	45.9; 37/39	–	24.4; 18/20	19.0; 14	0.7; 0	7.3; 3/6	2.4; 0	–	–	21.5
ElectoPanel/Electomanía	23 Feb–1 Mar 2020	1,000	?	44.9; 39	–	23.4; 19	16.6; 12	(Note: Within PP.)	8.6; 5	3.7; 0	–	–	21.5
SocioMétrica/El Español	26–28 Feb 2020	900	?	46.2; 37/38	–	22.3; 19/20	13.9; 9	–	10.2; 8	4.9; 1	–	–	23.9
Celeste-Tel/eldiario.es	24–28 Feb 2020	1,100	?	43.9; 36/38	–	25.2; 20/22	13.6; 9	1.3; 0	11.1; 8	2.9; 0	–	–	18.7
KeyData/Público	26 Feb 2020	?	65.0	44.7; 38	–	24.3; 19	15.8; 11	1.1; 0	8.0; 7	4.0; 0	–	–	20.4
Sondaxe/La Voz de Galicia	19–26 Feb 2020	?	66.6	43.7; 39	–	18.7; 15	16.7; 13	2.7; 0	12.6; 8	1.8; 0	–	–	25.0
ElectoPanel/Electomanía	13–22 Feb 2020	1,250	?	44.2; 38	–	24.0; 19	16.4; 13		9.3; 5	4.3; 0	–	–	20.2
Sigma Dos/PSdeG	21 Feb 2020	1,800	?	? 35/38	–	? 19/22	? 13/15	–	? 4	2.8; 0	–	–	?
NC Report/La Razón	17–21 Feb 2020	1,000	?	45.1; 38/39	–	24.8; 20/21	15.0; 11	1.0; 0	7.1; 5	4.6; 0	–	–	20.3
GAD3/ABC	16 Jan–14 Feb 2020	900	64	46.9; 41	–	26.2; 21	14.7; 11	1.7; 0	5.0; 2	2.9; 0	–	–	20.7
Metroscopia/El Confidencial	11–12 Feb 2020	1,000	58	46.6; 39	–	20.1; 16	18.5; 14	1.1; 0	8.4; 6	2.7; 0	–	–	26.5
ElectoPanel/Electomanía	10–12 Feb 2020	3,000	?	(Note: Within PP+Cs.)	1.5; 0	24.0; 19	14.8; 11		8.7; 5	4.8; 0	44.0; 40	–	20.0
ElectoPanel/Electomanía	10–12 Feb 2020	3,000	?	41.1; 37	1.6; 0	22.4; 19	15.4; 11	2.7; 0	9.2; 7	5.3; 1	–	–	18.7
Sondaxe/La Voz de Galicia	15–22 Jan 2020	1,223	69.4	43.0; 38	2.3; 0	21.3; 18	14.5; 11	2.2; 0	11.8; 8	1.9; 0	–	–	21.7
ElectoPanel/Electomanía	26–30 Dec 2019	?	?	39.9; 36	0.6; 0	23.9; 19	14.9; 11	3.4; 0	8.6; 5	6.5; 4	–	–	16.0
November 2019 general election	10 Nov 2019	—N/a	55.9	31.9 (28)	–	31.2 (27)	8.1 (6)	4.3 (0)	12.6 (9)	7.8 (5)	–	–	0.7
DYM/Prensa Ibérica	25–30 Oct 2019	?	?	41.6	3.0	20.7	17.3	1.9	7.8	6.0	–	–	20.9
Sondaxe/La Voz de Galicia	26 Sep–3 Oct 2019	1,223	?	41.1; 36	3.0; 0	22.3; 20	11.4; 9	4.3; 2	11.7; 8	1.0; 0	–	–	18.8
ElectoPanel/Electomanía	18 Aug 2019	?	?	37.4; 33	1.1; 0	26.6; 22	11.9; 8	6.7; 4	10.9; 8	2.9; 0	–	–	10.8
ElectoPanel/Electomanía	3 Jul 2019	?	?	37.2; 33	1.2; 0	27.6; 23	11.6; 8	6.2; 3	10.3; 8	3.5; 0	–	–	9.6
2019 EP election	26 May 2019	—N/a	54.5	29.8 (27)	1.1 (0)	35.1 (31)	11.8 (8)	6.7 (4)	8.1 (5)	2.6 (0)	–	–	5.3
April 2019 general election	28 Apr 2019	—N/a	61.9	27.4 (25)	1.1 (0)	32.1 (28)	5.7 (2)	11.2 (8)	14.5 (10)	5.3 (2)	–	–	4.7
SyM Consulting	10–13 Apr 2018	2,500	62.9	41.1; 34/37	16.0; 12/13	21.7; 17/19	7.6; 4/5	8.6; 4/6	–	–	–	–	19.4
Sondaxe/La Voz de Galicia	18 Jul–28 Aug 2017	1,500	?	45.9; 40	20.1; 15	17.8; 14	8.5; 6	–	–	–	–	–	25.8
Sondaxe/La Voz de Galicia	7–13 Jun 2017	855	?	46.4; 41	20.7; 16	16.9; 12	9.2; 6	–	–	–	–	–	25.7
2016 regional election	25 Sep 2016	—N/a	53.6	47.6; 41	19.1; 14	17.9; 14	8.3; 6	3.4; 0	–	–	–	–	28.5

=== Voting preferences ===
The table below lists raw, unweighted voting preferences.

Polling firm/Commissioner	Fieldwork date	Sample size	PP	En Marea	PSdeG–PSOE	BNG	Cs	Galicia en Común	Vox	Marea Galeguista	Question	X mark	Lead
2020 regional election (Note: Does not include non-resident citizens.)	12 Jul 2020	—N/a	28.0		11.3	13.9	0.4	2.3	1.2	0.1	—N/a	41.1	14.1
40dB/El País	19–30 Jun 2020	1,200	25.3		15.0	14.7	1.5	7.1	1.9	0.6	21.4	6.0	10.3
CIS	10–19 Jun 2020	3,398	26.3		10.2	10.4	0.4	3.0	0.8	0.6	41.5	4.2	15.9
CIS	17 Feb–2 Mar 2020	3,425	23.9		12.4	9.4	0.4	4.1	1.1	–	41.1	5.3	11.5
November 2019 general election	10 Nov 2019	—N/a	21.0	–	20.6	5.3	2.8	8.3	5.1	–	—N/a	33.4	0.4
2019 EP election	26 May 2019	—N/a	19.3	0.7	22.7	7.6	4.3	5.2	1.7	–	—N/a	34.7	3.4
April 2019 general election	28 Apr 2019	—N/a	20.0	0.8	23.4	4.2	8.2	10.6	3.8	–	—N/a	26.0	3.4
2016 regional election	25 Sep 2016	—N/a	30.0	12.0	11.3	5.3	2.1	–	–	–	—N/a	36.2	18.0

=== Victory preferences ===
The table below lists opinion polling on the victory preferences for each party in the event of a regional election taking place.

Polling firm/Commissioner	Fieldwork date	Sample size	PP	PSdeG–PSOE	BNG	Cs	Galicia en Común	Vox	Marea Galeguista	Other/ None	Question	Lead
CIS	10–19 Jun 2020	3,398	34.1	16.5	13.6	1.0	3.6	0.8	1.4	7.5	21.5	17.6
CIS	17 Feb–2 Mar 2020	3,425	32.7	19.7	12.4	0.7	5.5	1.3	–	7.0	20.6	13.0

=== Victory likelihood ===
The table below lists opinion polling on the perceived likelihood of victory for each party in the event of a regional election taking place.

Polling firm/Commissioner	Fieldwork date	Sample size	PP	PSdeG–PSOE	BNG	Other/ None	Question	Lead
CIS	10–19 Jun 2020	3,398	80.8	2.8	0.5	0.7	15.2	78.0
CIS	17 Feb–2 Mar 2020	3,425	73.3	6.7	0.8	0.8	18.4	66.6

=== Preferred President ===
The table below lists opinion polling on leader preferences to become president of the Regional Government of Galicia.

Polling firm/Commissioner	Fieldwork date	Sample size									Other/ None/ Not care	Question	Lead
Polling firm/Commissioner	Fieldwork date	Sample size	Feijóo PP	Villares En Marea	Caballero PSdeG	Pontón BNG	Pino Cs	G. Reino GeC	Fajardo Vox	Casal MG	Other/ None/ Not care	Question	Lead
CIS	10–19 Jun 2020	3,398	44.5	–	15.2	15.9	0.5	2.0	0.2	0.4	5.5	16.0	28.6
CIS	17 Feb–2 Mar 2020	3,425	40.1	1.2	18.3	13.3	0.6	2.4	0.8	–	7.4	15.9	21.8

== Voter turnout ==
The table below shows registered voter turnout during the election. Figures for election day do not include non-resident citizens, while final figures do.

Province	Time (Election day)									Final		
Province	12:00			17:00			20:00			Final		
Province	2016	2020	+/–	2016	2020	+/–	2016	2020	+/–	2016	2020	+/–
A Coruña	14.70%	18.79%	+4.09	42.02%	42.84%	+0.82	62.55%	57.97%	−4.58	54.05%	49.63%	−4.42
Lugo	15.20%	18.20%	+3.00	42.73%	41.89%	−0.84	65.22%	59.97%	−5.25	53.55%	48.27%	−5.28
Ourense	18.24%	21.70%	+3.46	44.49%	42.69%	−1.80	66.12%	60.79%	−5.33	48.70%	43.92%	−4.78
Pontevedra	14.21%	19.85%	+5.64	42.29%	43.60%	+1.31	63.85%	58.95%	−4.90	55.14%	50.44%	−4.70
Total	15.01%	19.42%	+4.41	42.49%	42.97%	+0.48	63.75%	58.88%	–4.87	53.63%	48.97%	–4.66

== Results ==
=== Overall ===
← Summary of the 12 July 2020 Parliament of Galicia election results →
Parties and alliances	Popular vote			Seats	
Parties and alliances	Votes	%	±pp	Total	+/−
People's Party (PP)	627,762	47.96	+0.40	42	+1
Galician Nationalist Bloc (BNG)	311,340	23.79	+15.46	19	+13
Socialists' Party of Galicia (PSdeG–PSOE)	253,750	19.39	+1.52	14	±0
Galicia in Common–Renewal–Tides (Podemos–EU–Anova)^{1}	51,630	3.94	−15.13	0	−14
Vox (Vox)	26,797	2.05	New	0	±0
Citizens–Party of the Citizenry (Cs)	9,840	0.75	−2.63	0	±0
Animalist Party Against Mistreatment of Animals (PACMA)	6,057	0.46	−0.60	0	±0
Galicianist Tide (En Marea–CxG–PG)^{2}	2,883	0.22	−0.07	0	±0
Zero Cuts–Common Space–The Greens–Municipalists (RC–EsCo–OV–M)	1,835	0.14	−0.02	0	±0
Equo Galicia (Equo)	956	0.07	New	0	±0
Communist Party of the Workers of Galicia (PCTG)	896	0.07	New	0	±0
For a Fairer World (PUM+J)	813	0.06	New	0	±0
Blank Seats (EB)	559	0.04	−0.04	0	±0
Citizens of Galicia Democratic Action (ADCG)	559	0.04	−0.01	0	±0
United for the Future! (Unidos SI–UDP–DEF)	533	0.04	+0.02	0	±0
Libertarian Party (P–LIB)	312	0.02	+0.01	0	±0
Democratic Centre Coalition–Self-employed (CCD–AUTONOMO)	266	0.02	New	0	±0
Union, Progress and Democracy (UPyD)	230	0.02	New	0	±0
With You, We Are Democracy (Contigo)	117	0.01	New	0	±0
XXI Convergence (C21)	40	0.01	−0.02	0	±0
Blank ballots	11,774	0.90	−0.08		
Total	1,308,949			75	±0
Valid votes	1,308,949	99.09	+0.09		
Invalid votes	12,006	0.91	−0.09		
Votes cast / turnout	1,320,955	48.97	−4.66		
Abstentions	1,376,535	51.03	+4.66		
Registered voters	2,697,490				
Sources
Footnotes: ^{1} Galicia in Common–Renewal–Tides results are compared to In Tide totals in the 2016 election.; ^{2} Galicianist Tide results are compared to Commitment to Galicia totals in the 2016 election.

Popular vote
PP	47.96%
BNG	23.79%
PSdeG–PSOE	19.39%
GeC–AM	3.94%
Vox	2.05%
Others	1.98%
Blank ballots	0.90%

Seats
PP	56.00%
BNG	25.33%
PSdeG–PSOE	18.67%

=== Distribution by constituency ===
Constituency	PP		BNG		PSdeG	
Constituency	%	S	%	S	%	S
A Coruña	49.2	14	24.9	7	16.8	4
Lugo	54.6	9	21.5	3	17.4	2
Ourense	53.1	8	19.9	3	19.7	3
Pontevedra	42.4	11	24.7	6	23.1	5
Total	48.0	42	23.8	19	19.4	14

== Aftermath ==
=== Government formation ===
Investiture; Nomination of Alberto Núñez Feijóo (PP)
Ballot →	3 September 2020
Required majority →	38 out of 75
Yes: • PP (42)	42 / 75
No: • BNG (19); • PSdeG (14)	33 / 75
Abstentions	0 / 75
Absentees	0 / 75

=== 2022 investiture ===
Investiture; Nomination of Alfonso Rueda (PP)
Ballot →	12 May 2022
Required majority →	38 out of 75
Yes: • PP (42)	42 / 75
No: • BNG (19); • PSdeG (14)	33 / 75
Abstentions	0 / 75
Absentees	0 / 75

== Bibliography ==
- Ley Orgánica 1/1981, de 6 de abril, de Estatuto de Autonomía para Galicia (Organic Law 1/1981). Official State Gazette (in Spanish). 6 April 1981 [version as of 17 July 2010]. BOE-A-1981-9564.
- Ley 1/1983, de 22 de febrero, reguladora de la Junta y su Presidente (Law 1/1983). Official State Gazette (in Spanish). 22 February 1983 [version as of 4 September 2015]. BOE-A-1983-23788.
- Ley Orgánica 5/1985, de 19 de junio, del Régimen Electoral General (Organic Law 5/1985). Official State Gazette (in Spanish). 19 June 1985 [version as of 25 June 2019]. BOE-A-1985-11672.
- Ley 8/1985, de 13 de agosto, de elecciones al Parlamento de Galicia (Law 8/1985). Official State Gazette (in Spanish). 13 August 1985 [version as of 31 August 2015]. BOE-A-1985-21380.
- Decreto 12/2020, de 10 de febrero, de disolución del Parlamento de Galicia y de convocatoria de elecciones (PDF) (Decree 12/2020). Official Journal of Galicia (in Spanish). 10 February 2020.
- Decreto 45/2020, de 18 de marzo, por el que se deja sin efecto la celebración de las elecciones al Parlamento de Galicia de 5 de abril de 2020 como consecuencia de la crisis sanitaria derivada del COVID-19 (PDF) (Decree 45/2020). Official Journal of Galicia (in Spanish). 18 March 2020.
- Decreto 72/2020, de 18 de mayo, de convocatoria de elecciones al Parlamento de Galicia (PDF) (Decree 72/2020). Official Journal of Galicia (in Spanish). 18 May 2020.
