= Acción Galega =

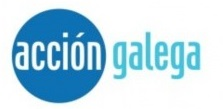
- Spokesperson: Rafael Cuíña
- Founded: 2012
- Merger of: Terra Galega, Galician Coalition, Galician Nationalist Party-Galicianist Party, Partido Galeguista Demócrata and independents.
- Headquarters: Santiago de Compostela
- Ideology: Galician nationalism Social liberalism
- Political position: Centre

Acción Galega (Galician Action in English language) is a Galician political organization led by former the former member of the PP Rafael Cuíña, former Galician autonomic Minister Teresa Táboas and the former senator of the Galician Nationalist Bloc (BNG) Xosé Manuel Perez Bouza. The party was founded in 2012 through the union of several parties of centrist and moderate Galician nationalist ideology: the Partido Galeguista Demócrata, the Galician Nationalist Party-Galicianist Party, Terra Galega and Galician Coalition.

Since its creation it is one of the founding organizations of Compromiso por Galicia (CxG). Terra Galega abandoned the organization in November 2012.
