= Valdecorvos (Pontevedra) =

Neighbourhood in Pontevedra, Spain

- Neighbourhood of Pontevedra
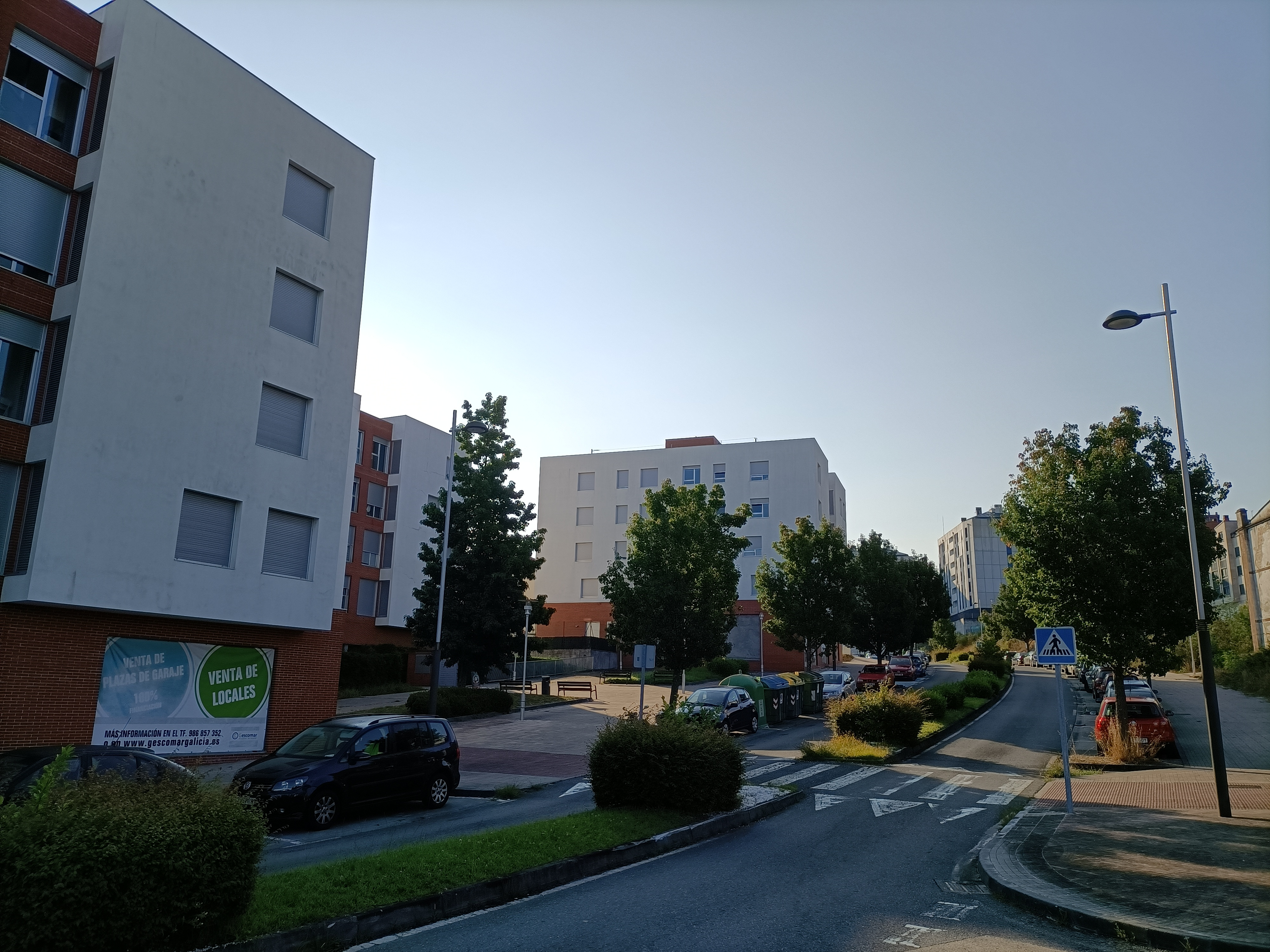
- Prado Novo Street
- Coordinates: 42°25′52″N 8°37′38″W
- Country: Spain
- City: Pontevedra
- Postal code: 36004

Valdecorvos is a neighbourhood located in the eastern part of the city of Pontevedra (Spain). It is a recent residential area.

== Location ==
The Valdecorvos neighbourhood is located in the east of the city of Pontevedra. It borders the A Seca and Santa Margarita neighbourhoods to the north, the neighbourhood at the end of Loureiro Crespo Street and Lugo Avenue to the south, Lugo Avenue and the N-541 road to the east and the Castañal neighbourhood to the west.

== History ==
The Valdecorvos neighbourhood was included in the city's 1989 local urban plan as an area reserved for subsidised housing. The first steps for its development date back to 1992, but due to various vicissitudes, the urbanisation file was not taken up again until 2001. However, the development of the land was only concretised in January 2008, when the specific modification of the urban development plan was approved, which unblocked the project.

The urbanisation project was finally presented in September 2008 by the councillor in charge of the Ministry of Housing at the time, Teresa Táboas, which envisaged the construction of more than half a thousand dwellings in the area, some of which were social housing.

The development of the neighbourhood took 20 months and was completed in April 2010. The first construction permit for the first three buildings was granted in June 2010 and on 9 June 2010, the central Prado Novo street was opened to pedestrian and vehicle traffic.

In August 2010, construction began on a road under the railway line to connect the neighbourhood to the west with José Malvar Street and the city centre. In April 2011, work began on the development of Sequiña Street, from the new underground passage to Prado Novo Street.

A complete upgrade of the Valdecorvos park was completed in April 2022.

== Description ==
The neighbourhood is built around a large green area, the Valdecorvos Park, to the south of which flows the Valdecorvos stream. It is the largest park in the east of the city. In addition to the trees, it has pedestrian paths and a wooden bridge to cross the Valdecorvos stream, a footbridge on stilts to connect it to the Costado area and wooden stairs to Prado Novo street. It has a viewpoint in the northern part with views to the east of the city. There is an oak grove and the viewpoint is designed as a rest area with urban furniture. In addition to this park, there are gardens linked to each block of buildings and, to the east of the neighbourhood, the As Regas park.

Valdecorvos has a 22 metre wide semi-circular main street, Prado Novo Street, with 375 surface parking spaces. This street is connected to Lugo Avenue and Ourense Road by a roundabout and an entry and exit lane. From the central Prado Novo street there are also three internal junctions that end in roundabouts, and a street to the west that connects directly with José Malvar street, Sequiña street, which includes a passage under the railway.

The area is dominated to the north by the Pita estate, a property declared to be singular, with several century-old trees, including a collection of camellias.

== Gallery ==
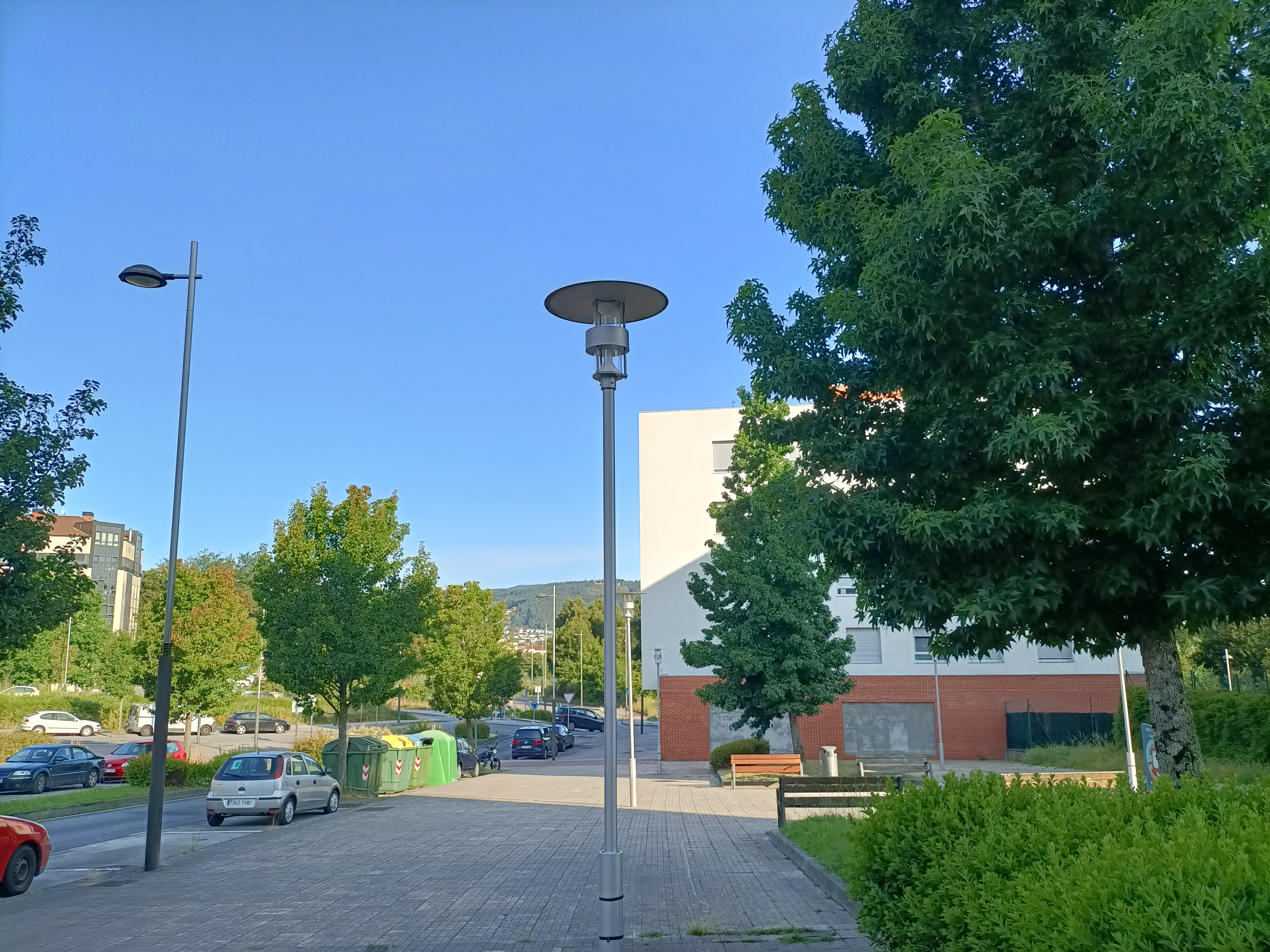

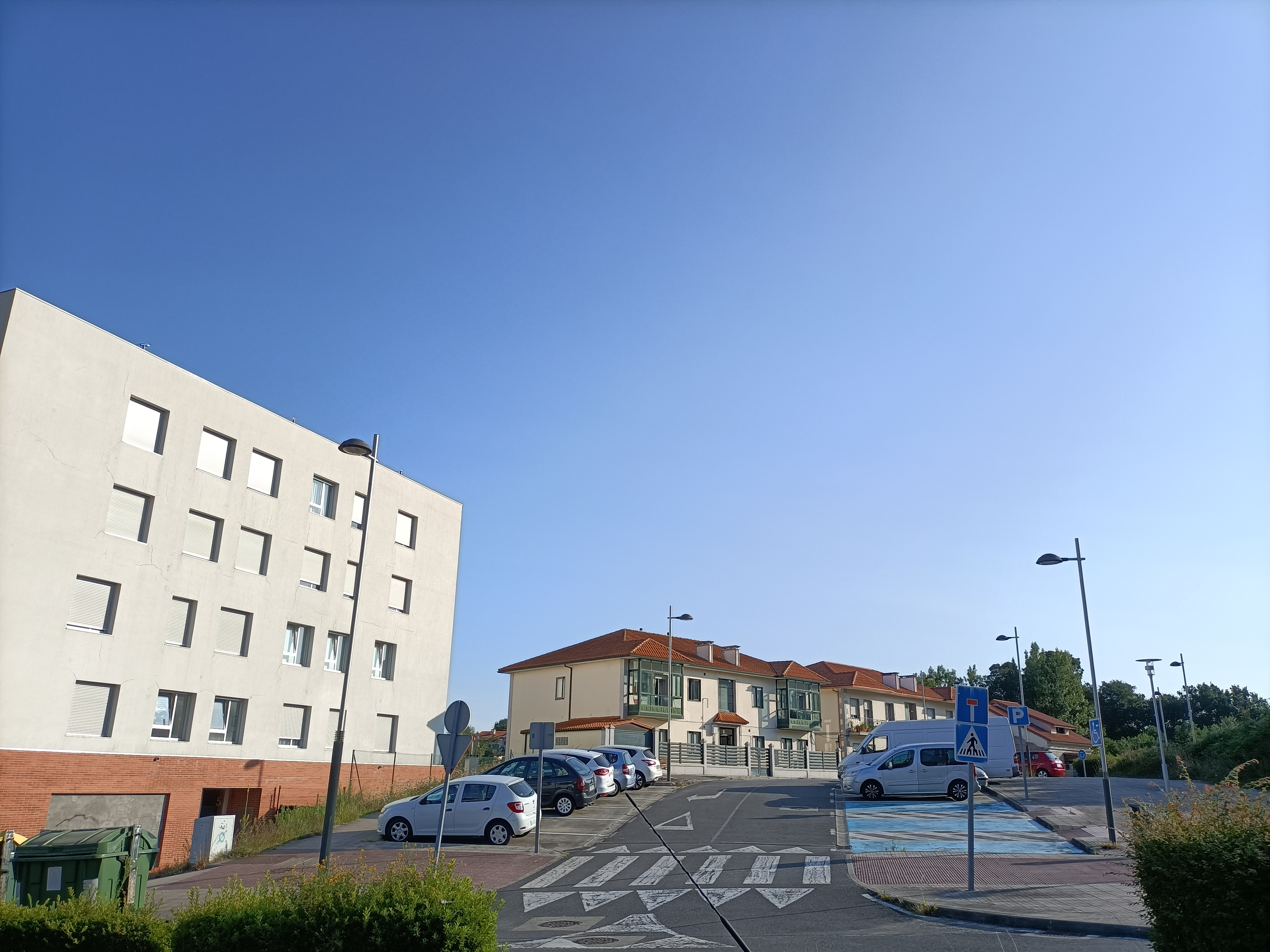

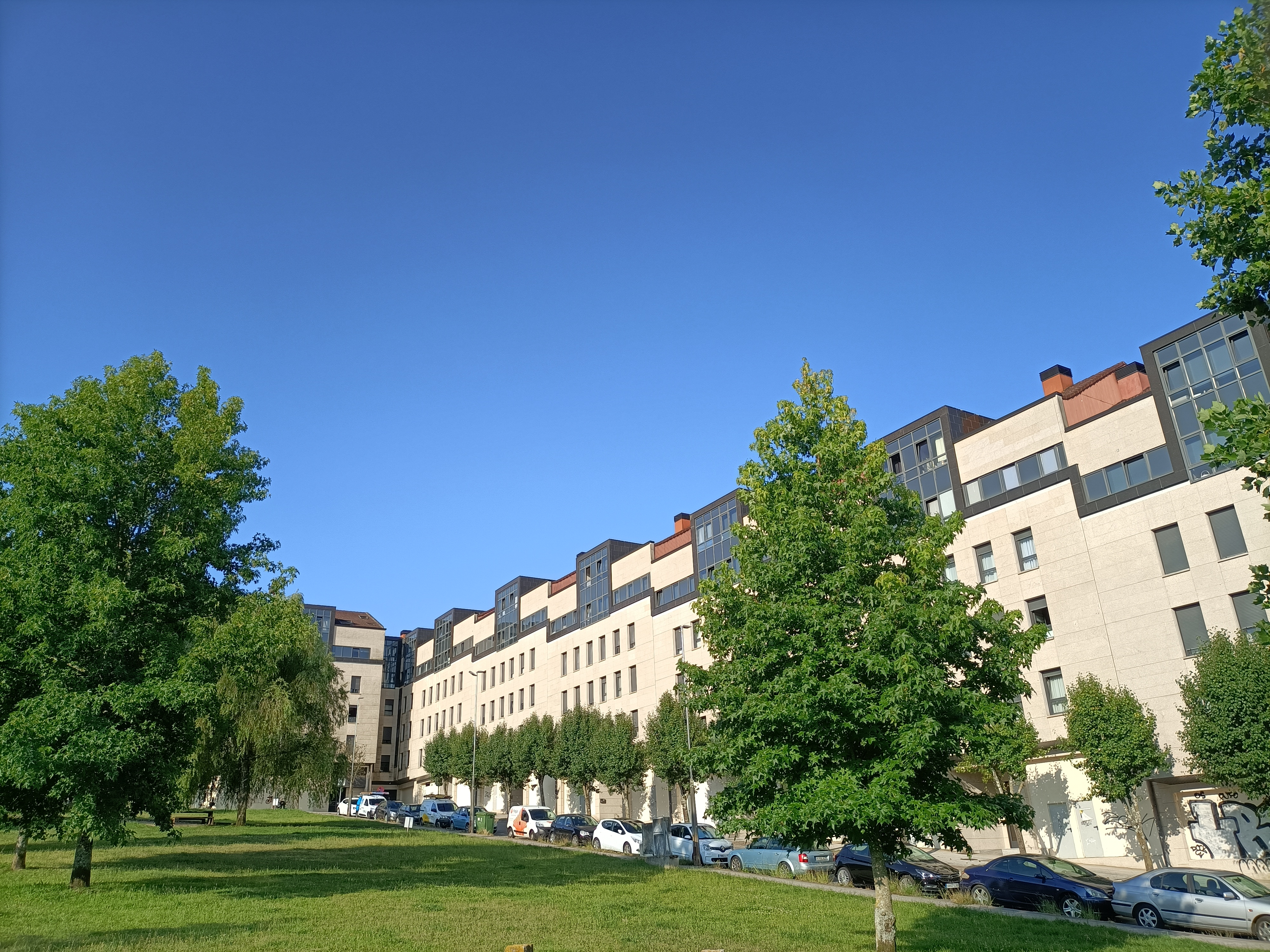

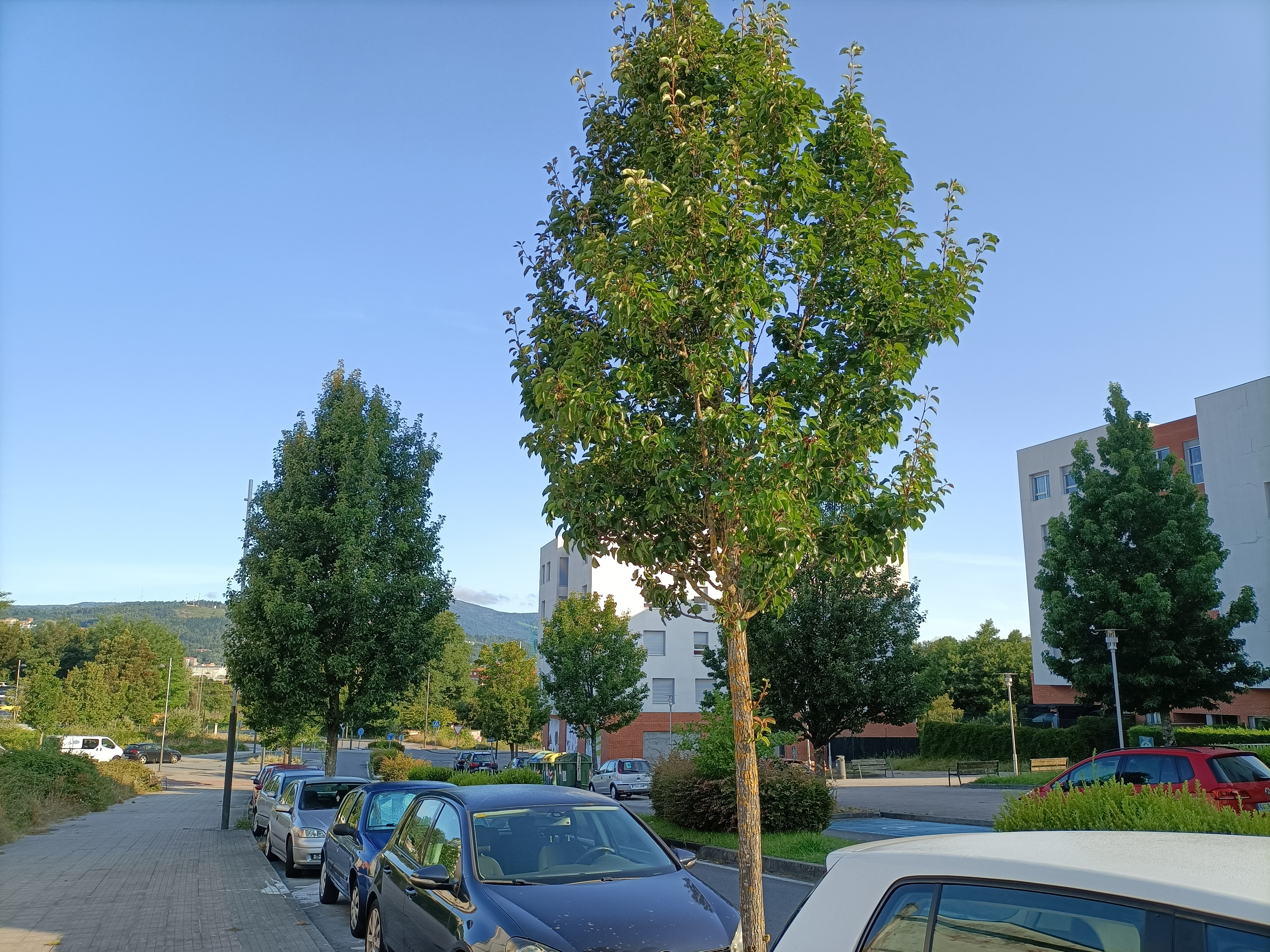

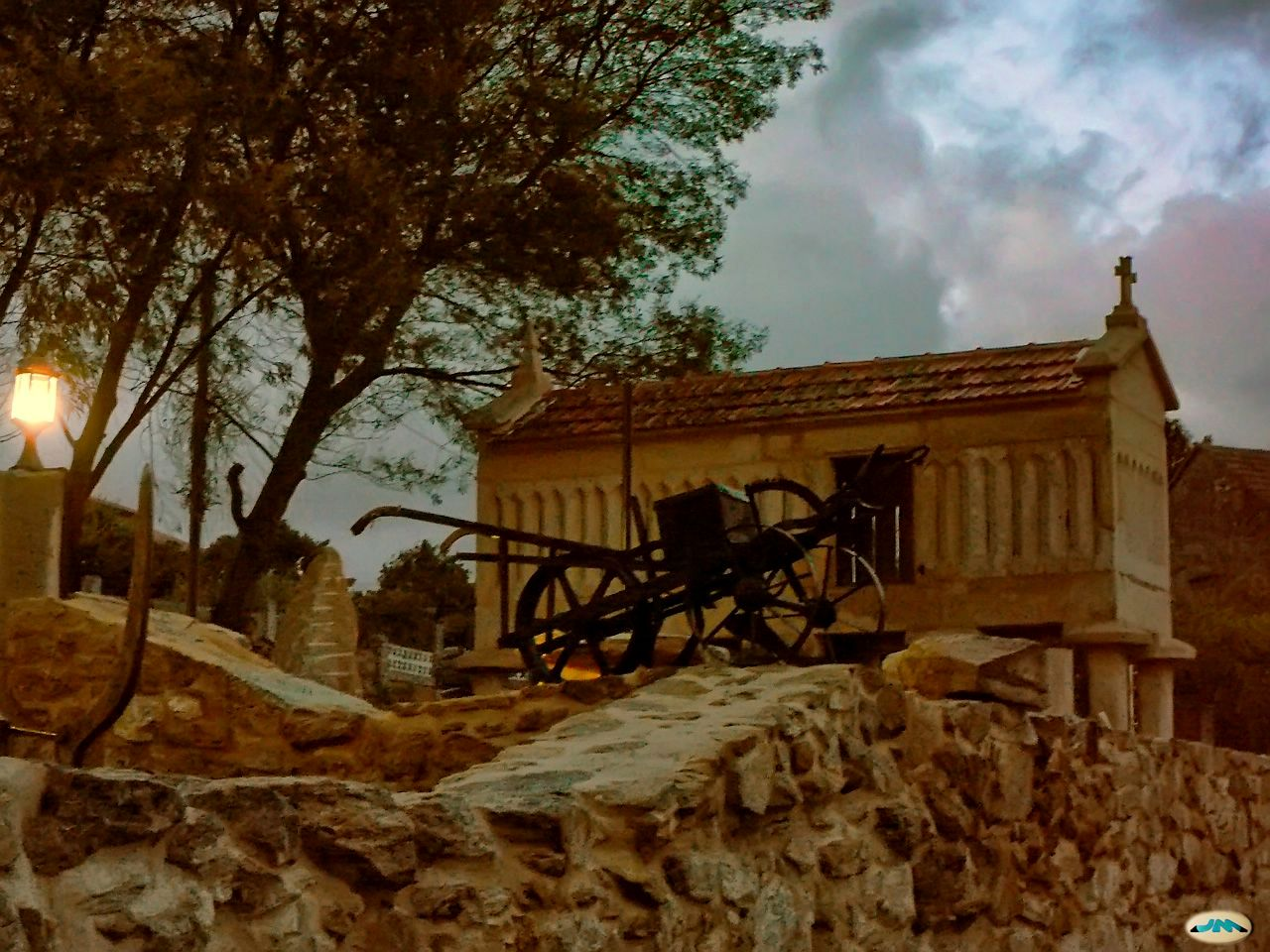

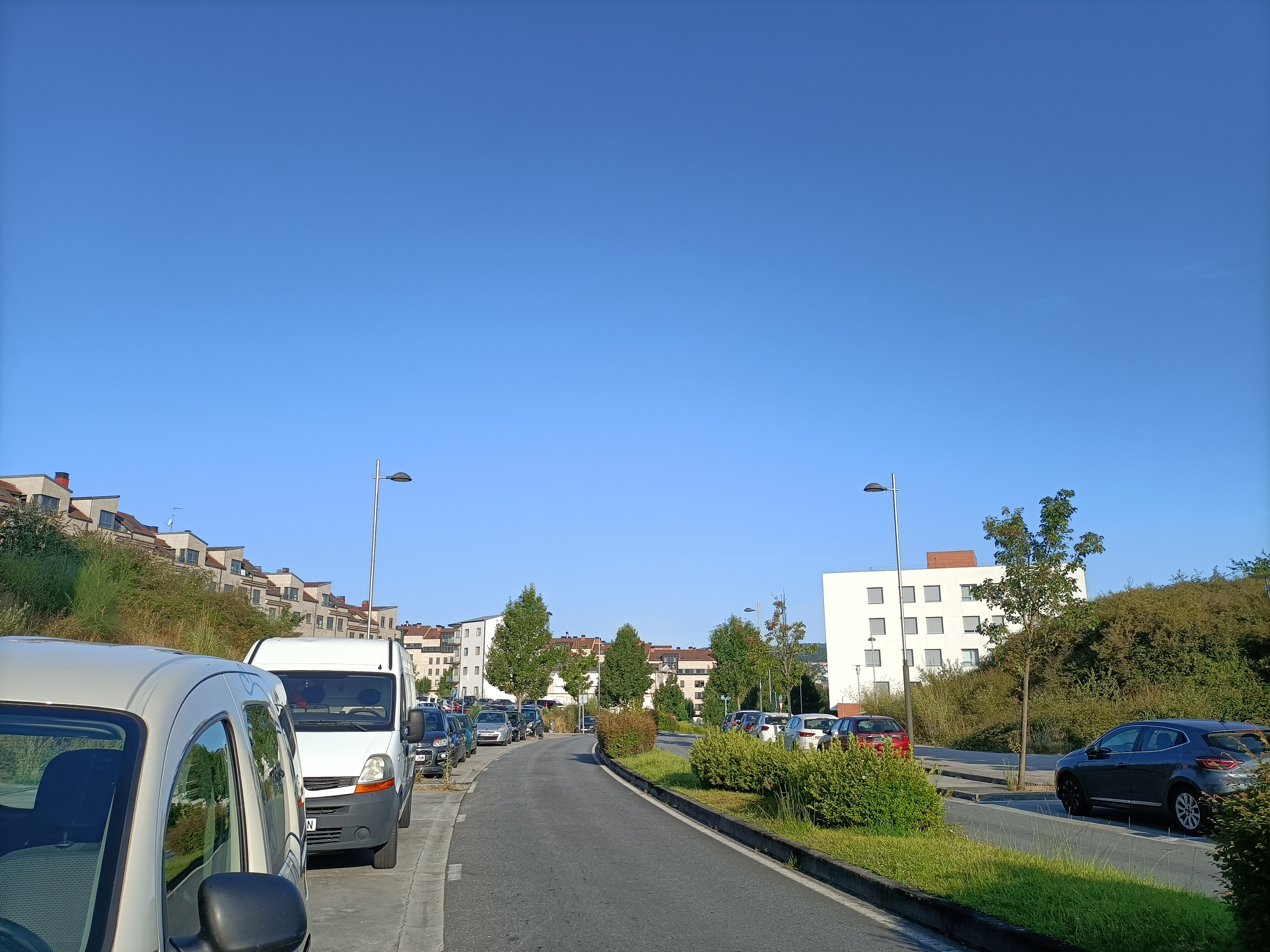

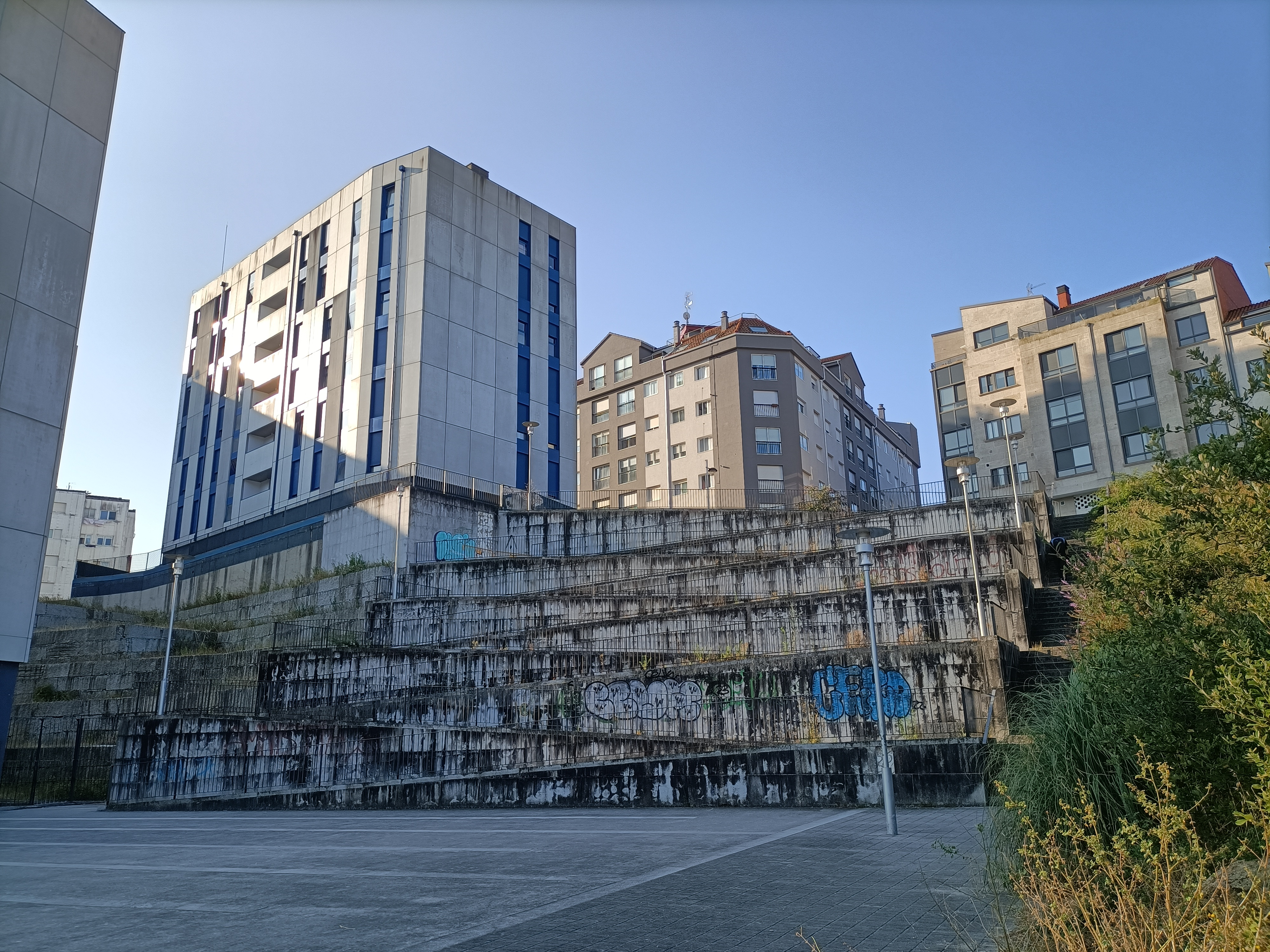

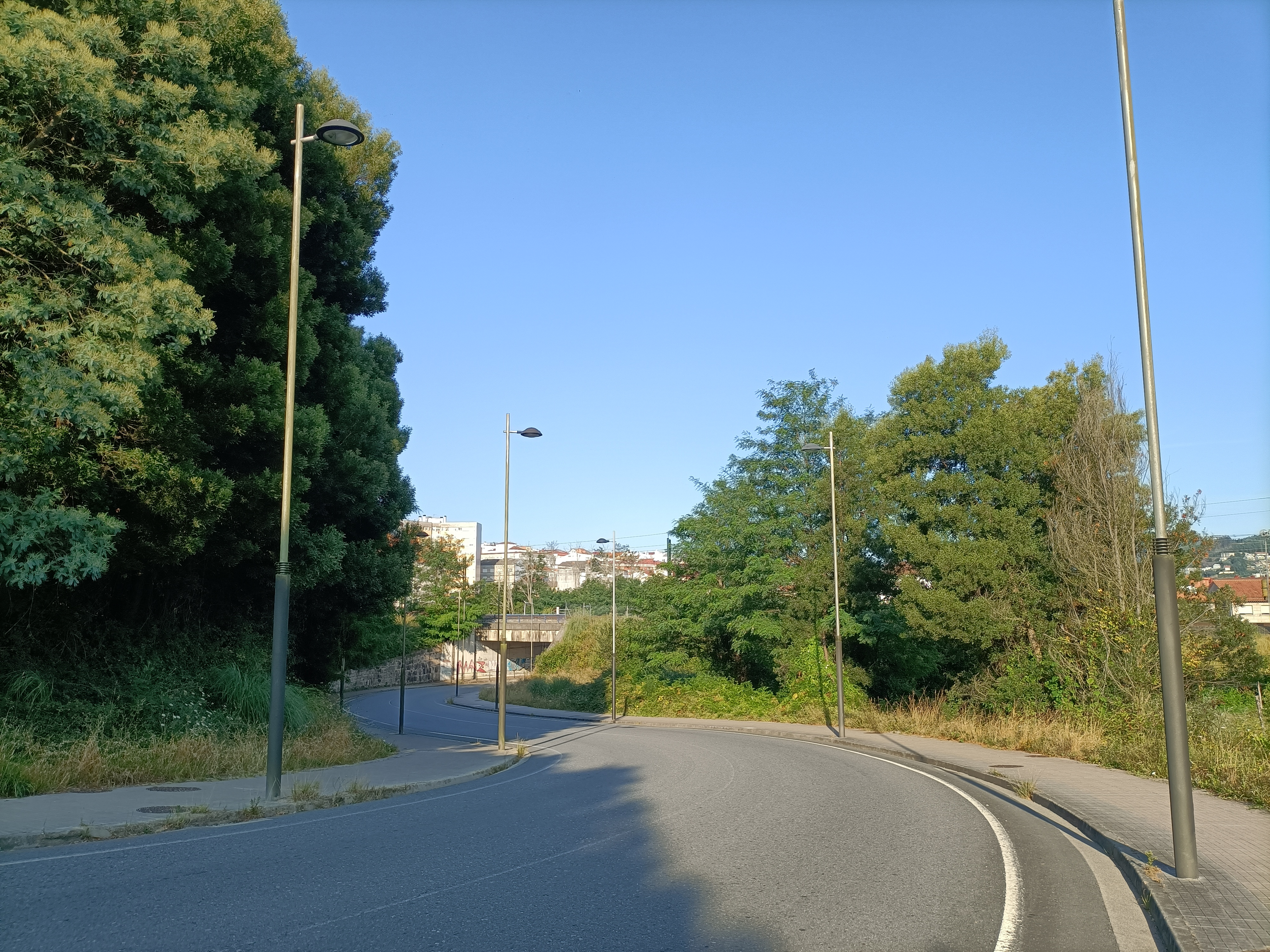

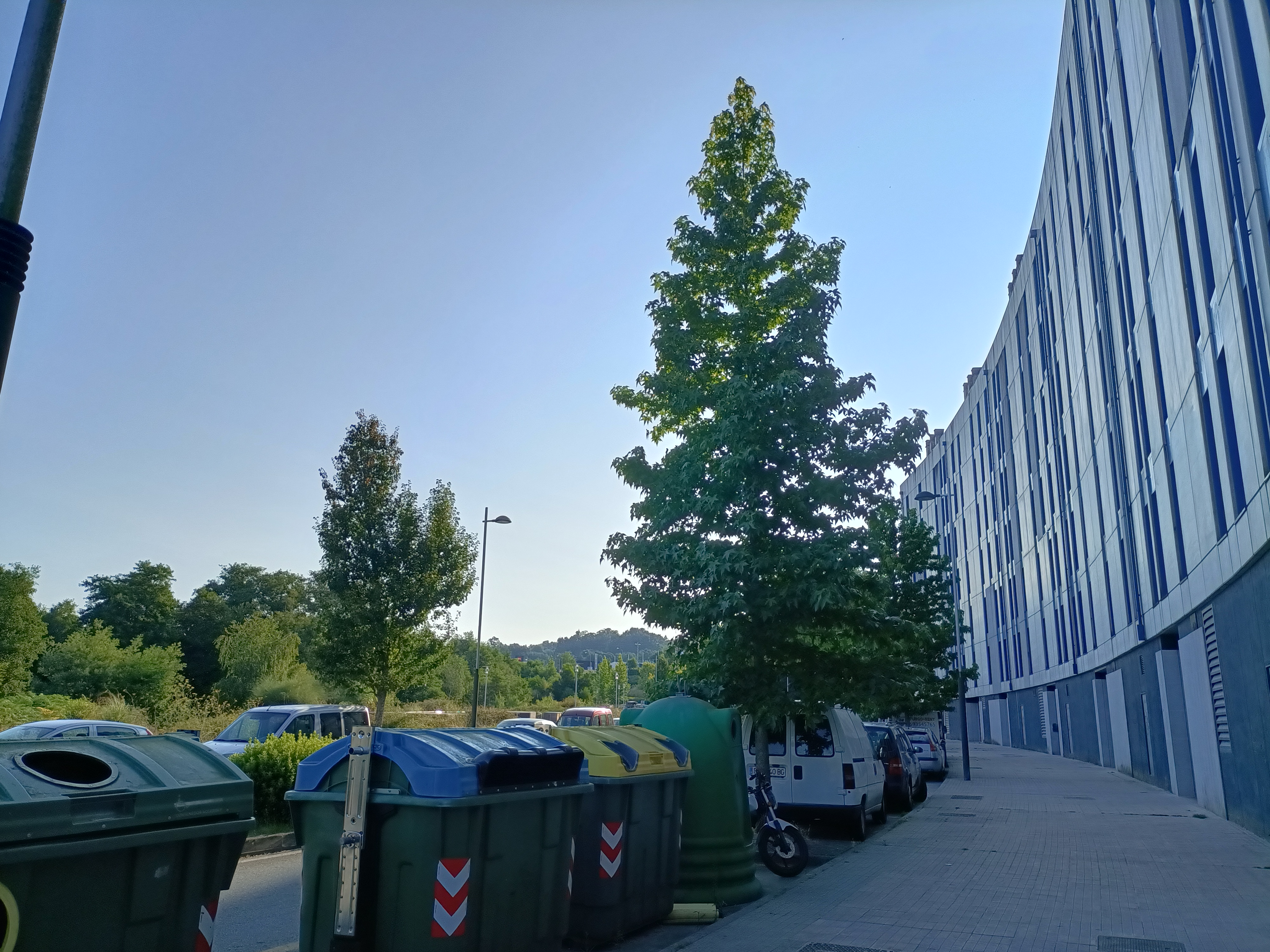

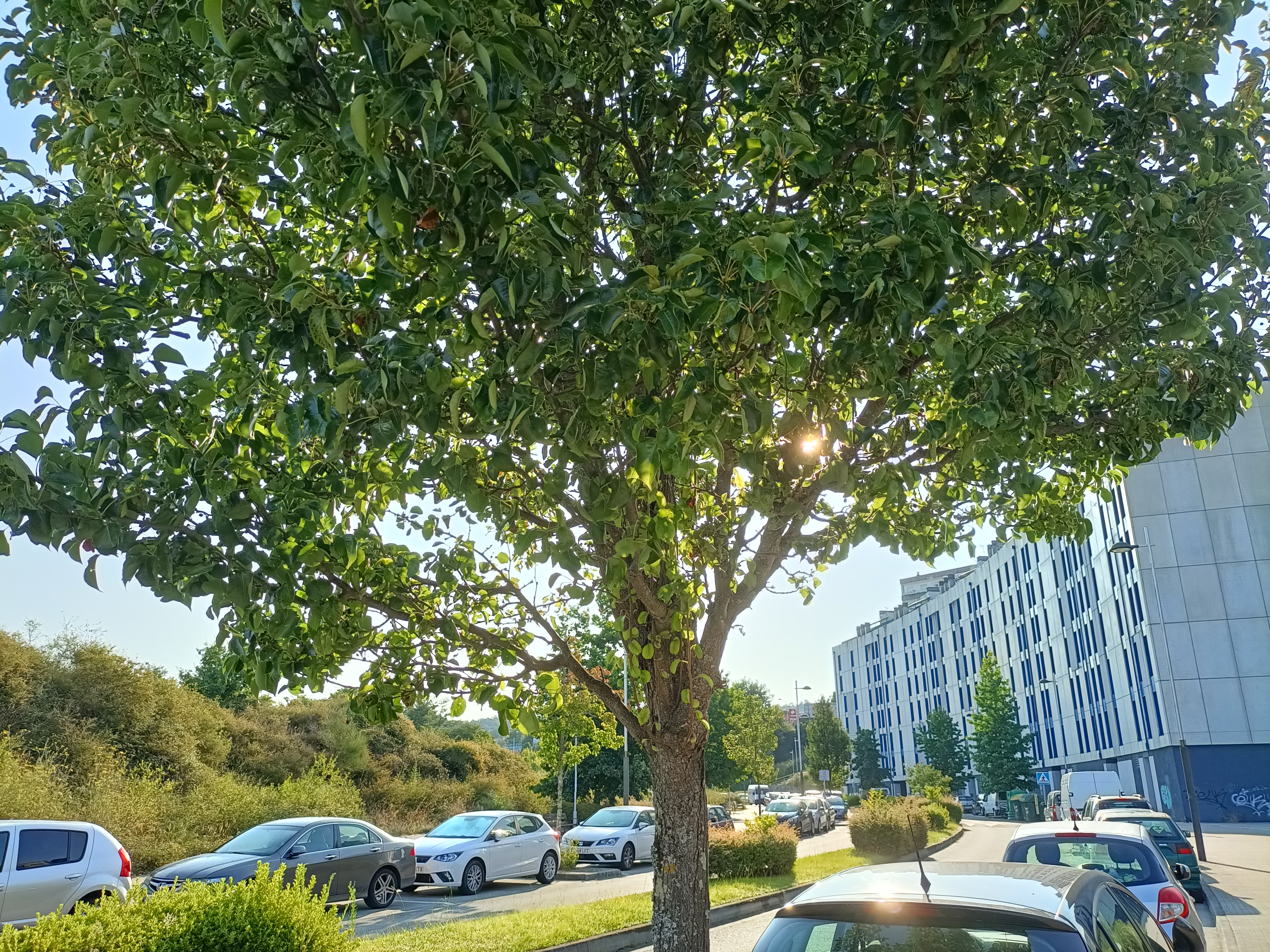

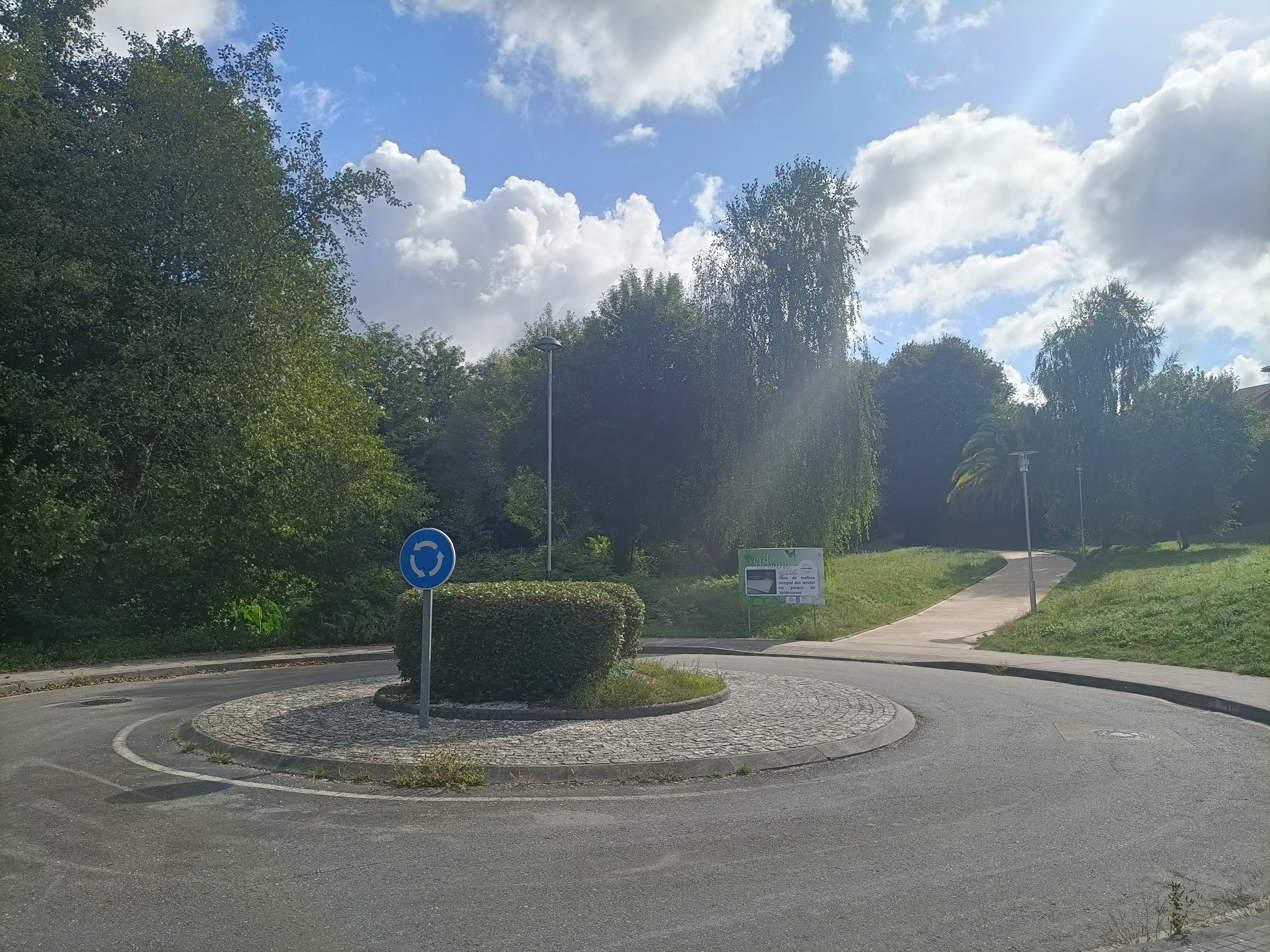

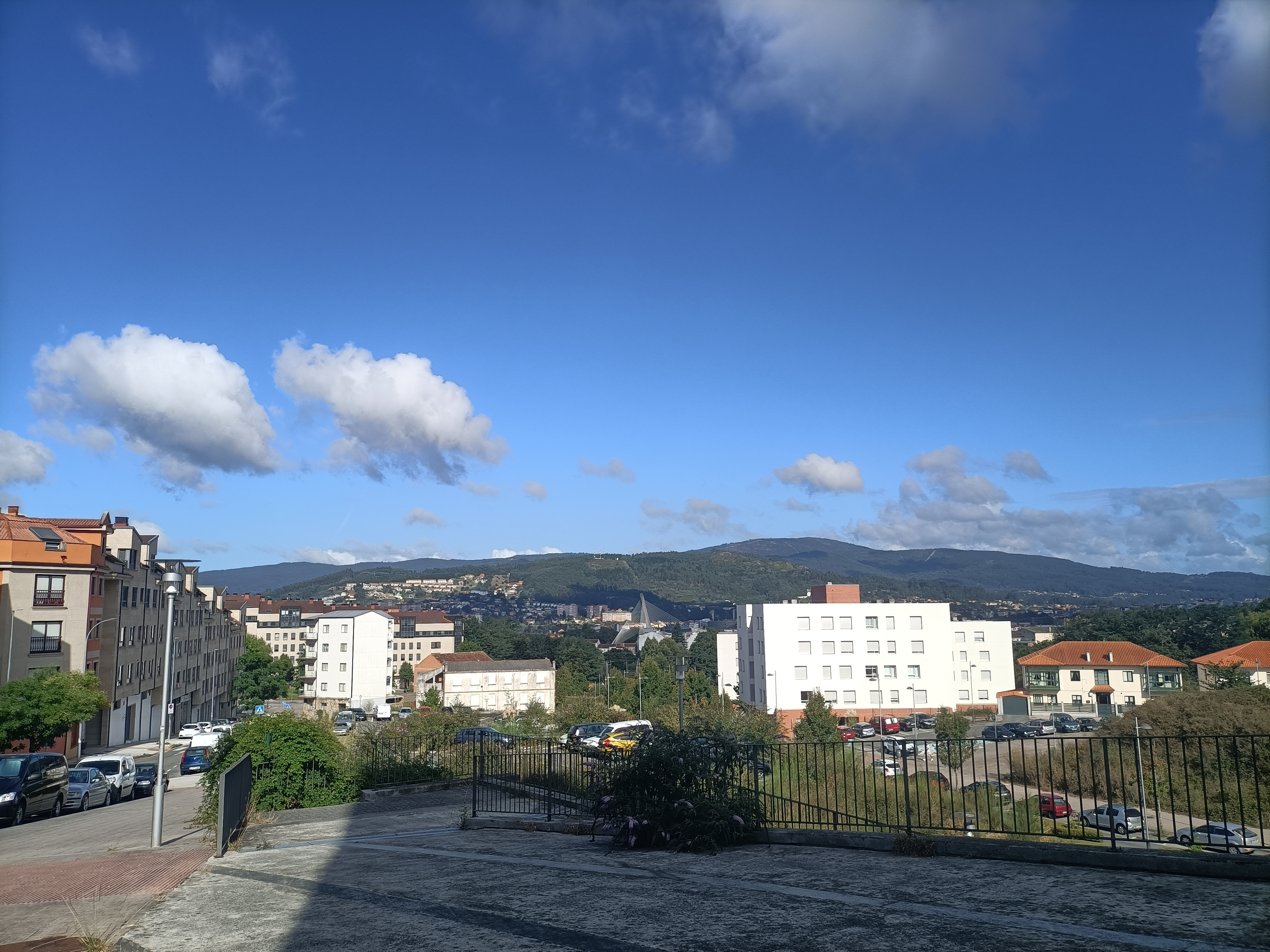

== See also ==
=== Related articles ===
- A Parda

=== External links ===
- Composting in the neighbourhood
