= Valentín González Formoso =

Spanish politician

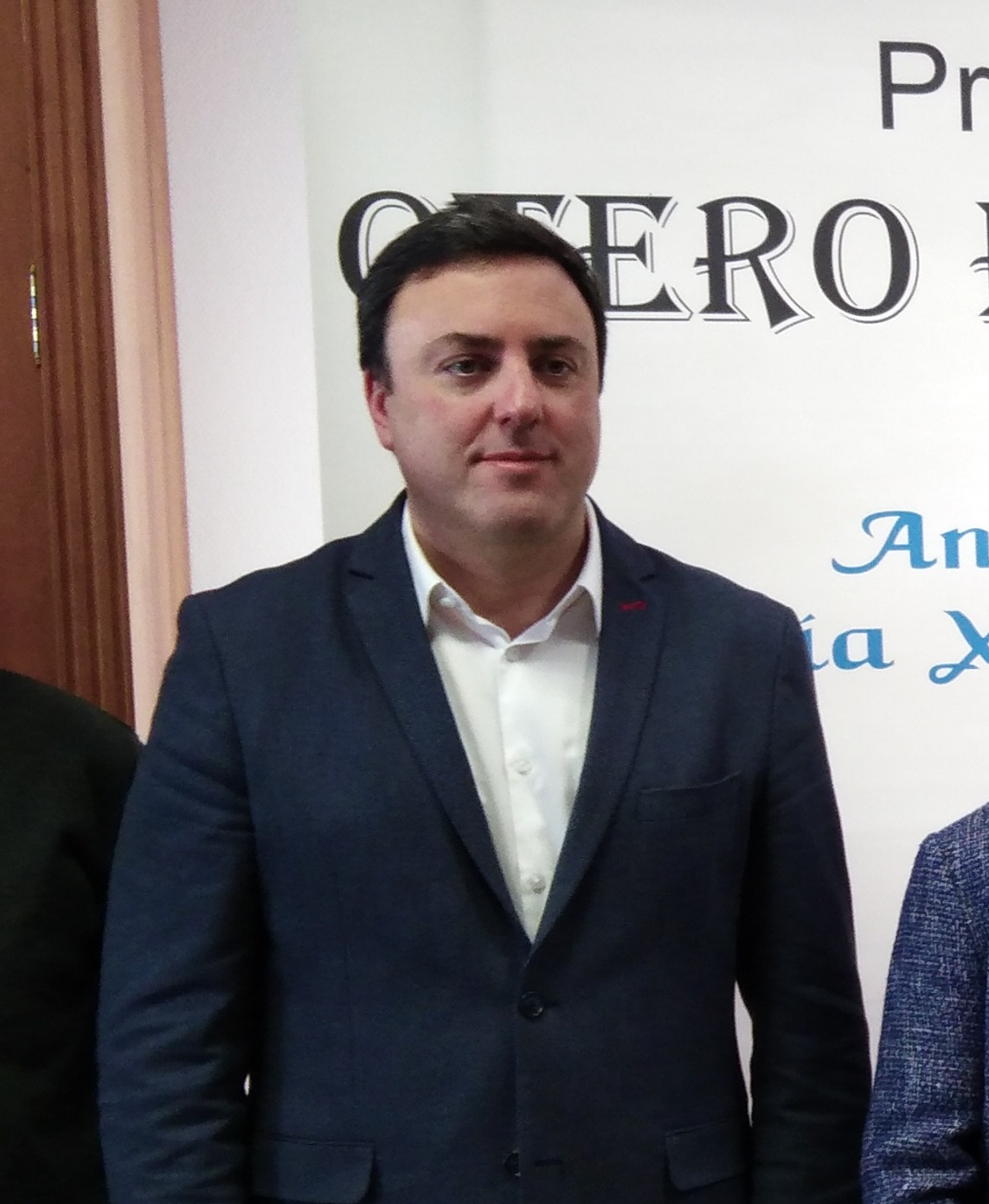
Valentín González Formoso

Valentín González Formoso (born 1971) is a Spanish politician of the Socialists' Party of Galicia (PSdeG). He is a city councillor (2003–) and mayor (2007–) of his hometown of As Pontes de García Rodríguez, the president of the Provincial Deputation of A Coruña (2015–) and secretary general of his party since December 2021.

== Biography ==
Born in As Pontes de García Rodríguez, González Formoso studied Law but put his course on hiatus due to work. First elected to the city council of As Pontes de García Rodríguez in 2003, he became mayor in 2007 and was re-elected in 2011 and 2015, all three times with an absolute majority. In June 2015, the same month as his third election, he became president of the Provincial Deputation of A Coruña due to a pact with the Galician Nationalist Bloc (BNG) and En Marea. In an interview with ABC in December 2015, he defended provincial deputations against their critics, including the BNG.

In October 2021, González Formoso put himself forward as a candidate for secretary general of the PSdeG. He defeated incumbent Gonzalo Caballero by 59.7% to 40.21%.

González Formoso has described himself as an admirer of the "old politics" of Spanish Socialist Workers' Party (PSOE) prime minister Felipe González and former PSdeG leader Francisco Vázquez Vázquez. He criticised Podemos founder Pablo Iglesias for questioning the motives of the architects of the Spanish transition to democracy, whom González Formoso considers to be "people who left their ideologies to one side in order to construct the common project of coexistence that we have today".
