= Marea Galeguista =

- Leader: Pancho Casal
- Founded: 30 May 2020
- Dissolved: 2020
- Headquarters: Pl. Horta de Abaixo, 5B, 4ºA; 15220, Ames
- Ideology: Galician nationalism Left-wing nationalism
- Political position: Left-wing
- Members: See list of members

Website
- mareagaleguista.gal

Marea Galeguista (English: "Galicianist Tide") was an electoral coalition formed on 30 May 2020 to contest the rescheduled 2020 Galician regional election on 12 July. Its main candidate to the Xunta de Galicia was Pancho Casal. The alliance was formed by Commitment to Galicia (CxG), Galicianist Party (PG) and En Marea, the latter having broken up with its previous partners: Podemos, Anova and EU.

== Composition ==
Party
In Tide (En Marea)
Commitment to Galicia (CxG)
Galicianist Party (PG)

== Electoral performance ==
=== Parliament of Galicia ===
Parliament of Galicia
Election	Votes	%	#	Seats	+/–	Leading candidate	Status in legislature
2020	2,863	0.22%	8th	0 / 75	0	Pancho Casal	No seats
