= Partido Galego =

- President: Francisco Villanueva de Lugo
- Secretary: Miguel Míguez
- Founded: 2020
- Ideology: Galician nationalism Centrism; Pro-Europeanism
- Political position: Centre

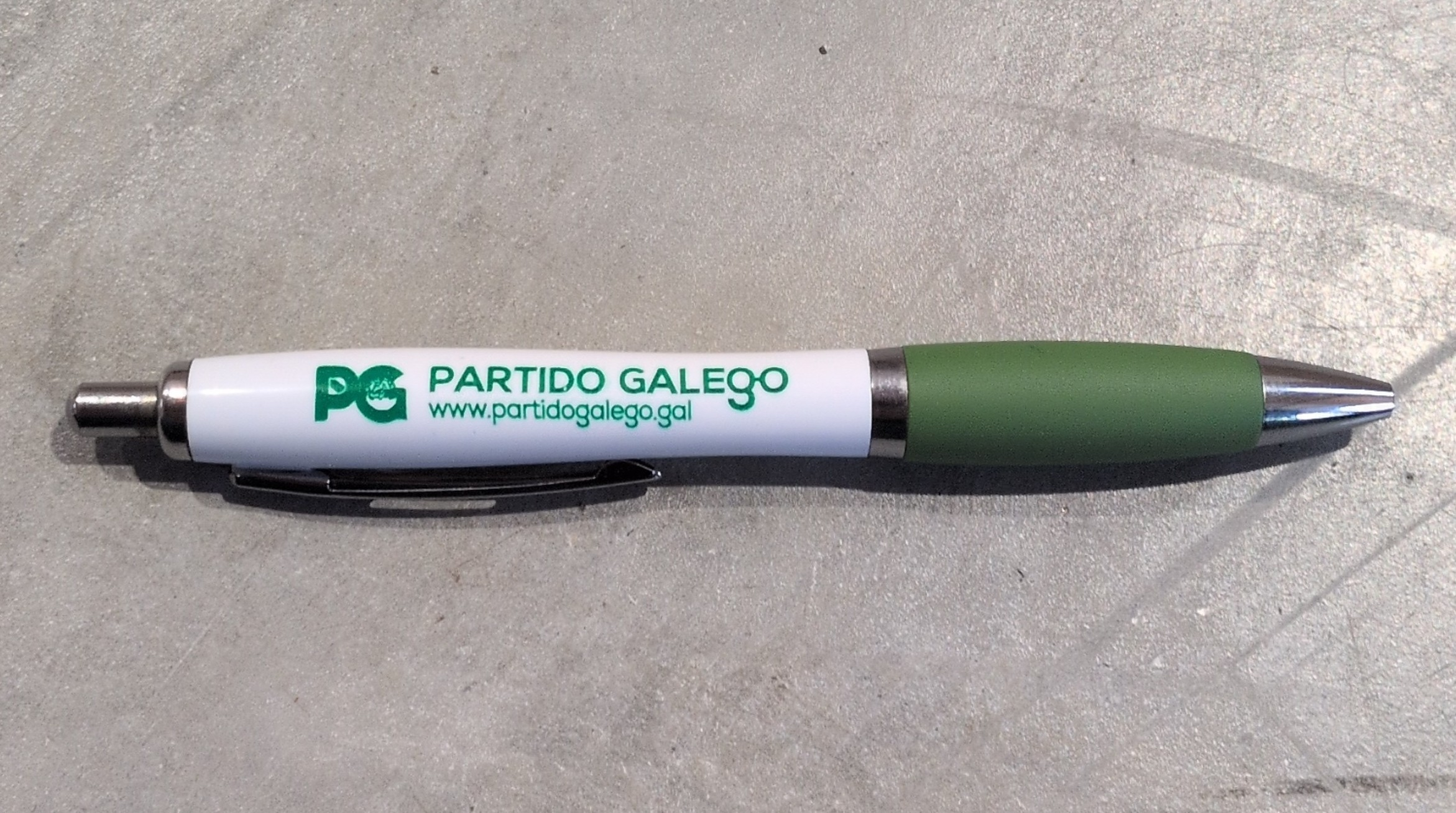
Propaganda pen distributed by the PG.

The Partido Galego (PG) is a centrist Galician nationalist political party, created in 2020 with the goal of representing all people identifying as Galician and Spanish and that consider Galicia to be an autonomous community with its own language and culture.

== Electoral results ==
=== Local elections ===
Election	Coalition	Votes	Percentage (%)	Councillors	Absolute majorities	Simple majorities
2023	Member of Contamos	4.589 ▲	0,32% ▲	18 / 3,705	0	2 ▲

=== European Parliament elections ===
European Parliament
Election	Total			Galicia		
Election	Votes	Percentage (%)	Seats	Votes	Percentage (%)	Seats
2024	5.719 ▲	0,03% ▲	0 / 54	2.074 ▲	0,18% ▲	0

== See also ==
=== External links ===
Partido Galego on Instagram
