= Teresa Táboas =

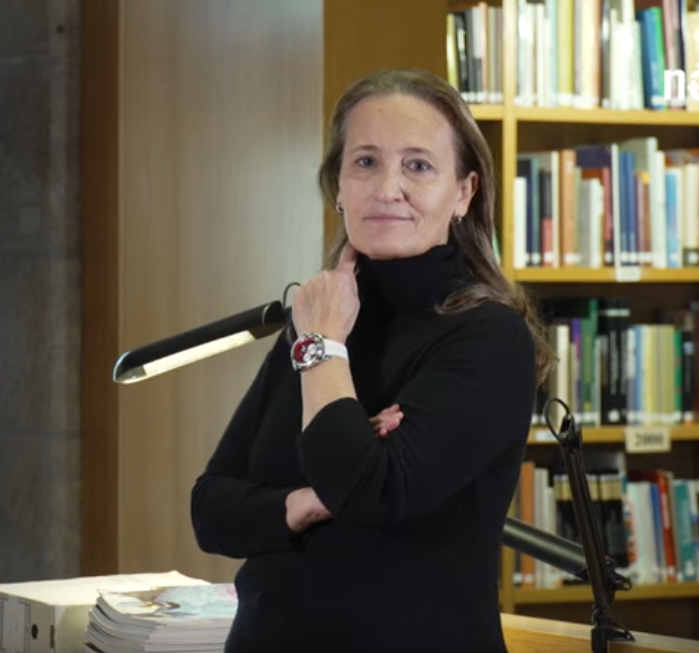
- Teresa Táboas in an interview for Nós TV, 2023
- Born: 1961 (age 64–65); Mexico City
- Education: National Autonomous University of Mexico
- Occupation: Architect
- Practice: César Portela, Concello of Marín; Colegio Oficial de Arquitectos de Galicia

María Teresa Táboas Veleiro (born 1961 in Mexico City, Mexico) is an architect, professor and Galician politician. She has been part of the Galician government as Conselleira of House and Real State of the Board of Galicia between 2005 and 2009. She was chosen in 2009 deputy of the Galician Parliament, a post she occupied until February 2012.

== Biography ==
She was born in Ciudad de México, daughter of Spanish emigrants from Carballiño and Beariz, and is the eldest of four siblings.

After her formative years she decided to study architecture, with Luis Barragán as a mentor. After obtaining her degree at the Autonomous National University of Mexico she went back to Spain, working for six years in the study of César Portela, and two years in the Concello of Marín.

She obtained her doctorate with a thesis directed by the architect César Portela titled "The Colour in Architecture", obtaining the qualification of cum laude.

In 1990 she left Portela's studio for setting up her own as "Teresa Táboas Estudio de Arquitectura", where she has developed several projects of Building and Urbanism.

Between 1999 and 2003, she was the President of the pontevedrian Colegio Oficial de Arquitectos de Galicia, and on 15 May 2003 she became the first female Dean and President of COAG. She is also a consultant at the Superior Council of Spanish Architects, being the second woman at this position since the institution was founded in 1931. She has also been a member of the consultative commissions for Sustainable Architecture and Urbanism at the European Parliament's Architect commission, representing the Superior Council of Spanish Architects, and in 2006 was awarded the gold medal from the University of Anáhuac for her professional trajectory. She is also the president of the Housing Committee of the European Architect Council from 2012.

She is mother of two sons.
