= Partido Galeguista Demócrata =

- Founded: 2004
- Ideology: Galician nationalism Social liberalism Europeanism
- Political position: Centre to centre-left
- Regional affiliation: Marea Galeguista (2020)
- Local government: 0 / 3,721

Party flag
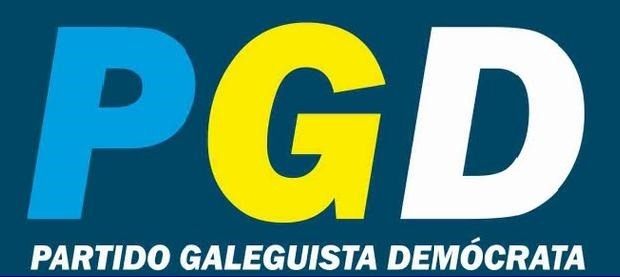

Website
- Official website

The Partido Galeguista Demócrata (PGD, Galicianist/Galician Nationalist Democratic Party) is a Galician centrist political party that claims to be the ideological heir of the Partido Galeguista. Until 2011 its name was Partido Galeguista.

== Ideology ==
The PGD defines itself as "democratic nationalist, progressive and pro-European". The PGD is rejected by historical galeguistas as Avelino Pousada Antelo, President of the Castelao Foundation, who believes that the current PGD has nothing to do with who with the party that Castelao led.

== History ==
The party was created in 2004 by the reactivation of the previous Partido Galeguista, the majority of which had been integrated into the Galician Coalition in 1984. The same year the party merged with Democracia Progresista Galega-Progresistas Vigueses. Its leader was the former mayor of Vigo Manoel Soto and its president Xavier González.

Between September 2005 and June 2006 Identidade Galega (IDEGA), a splinter party of National Democracy whose political action was based on opposition to immigration, was integrated in the PGD. IDEGA left the PGD due to their differences in immigration issues. The PGD won 1.22% of the vote in the 2007 local elections in Galiza, which resulted in 10 town councillors, being the sixth most voted political force in the community.

Before the local elections in 2011 changed its name to Partido Galeguista Demócrata. In that elections the party gained 5,266 votes (the 0.33% of all the votes in Galiza) and 6 town councillors. In August 2012 the PGD announced its integration in Compromiso por Galicia through Acción Galega.

=== Local councils ===
Local councils
Election	Spain			Galicia		
Election	Votes	%	Seats won	Votes	%	Seats won
2011	19,739	0.09	10 / 68,230	19,739	1.2	10 / 3,901
2011	5,264	0.03	6 / 68,230	5,264	0.3	6 / 3,811
2015	1,258	0.00	3 / 67,515	1,258	0.1	3 / 3,766
