= Gonzalo Caballero =

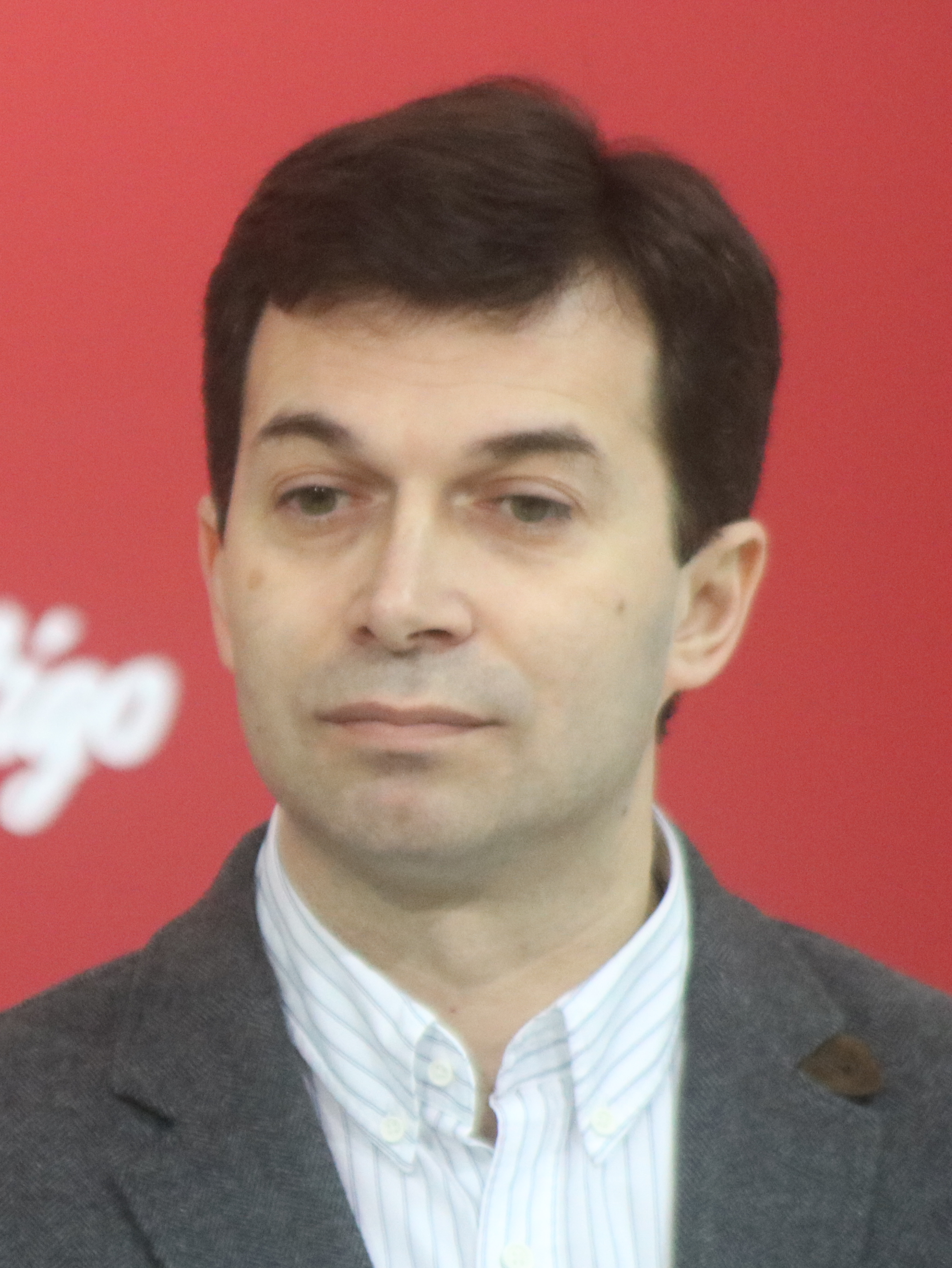
- In 2018

Secretary-General of the PSdeG-PSOE
- In office 8 October 2017 – 8 December 2021
- Preceded by: José Ramón Gómez Besteiro
- Succeeded by: Valentín González Formoso

Member of the Parliament of Galicia
- Incumbent
- Assumed office 31 July 2019

Member of the Vigo City Council
- In office 11 September 2005 – 16 June 2007

Personal details
- Born: 9 January 1975 (age 51) Ponteareas, Spain
- Party: Spanish Socialist Workers' Party
- Occupation: Economist, lecturer, economist

Gonzalo Caballero Míguez (born 9 January 1975) is a Spanish economist and politician. He is the secretary-general of the Socialists' Party of Galicia (PSdeG-PSOE) since 2017.

== Biography ==
Born in Ponteareas (province of Pontevedra) on 9 January 1975, his father was a Socialist councillor in the municipality. He is nephew of Abel Caballero, former minister of the Government of Spain and current mayor of Vigo, and member of the Spanish Socialist Workers' Party (PSOE).

Caballero joined the PSOE at an early age. Following his obtention of a licentiate degree in Economic and Business Sciences from the University of Vigo, he earned a PhD in economics from the University of Vigo, reading a dissertation titled Los fundamentos de la nueva economía institucional los determinantes institucionales de la política económica en España, supervised by José Carlos Arias Moreira. Years later he would also obtain a PhD in political science from the University of A Coruña, reading a dissertation titled Nuevo institucionalismo, gobernanza y economía política: El cambio institucional de la política española, supervised by Ramón Máiz. He works as senior lecturer in Applied Economics at the University of Vigo.

He ran 9th in the Socialists' Party of Galicia (PSdG-PSOE) list vis-à-vis the 2003 Vigo municipal election. Caballero was not elected then, as the list only obtained 8 seats, but he became a municipal councillor in September 2005 covering the vacant seat left by Ventura Pérez Mariño. He would not stand up for reelection in the 2007 municipal election. For several years Caballero held important political differences with his uncle Abel (Mayor of Vigo since 2007), although according to Caballero they reportedly did not transcend into the personal sphere. A renowned sanchista, Caballero won the PSG-PSOE vote to determine the Secretary-General of the organization in October 2017 running under a grassroots candidate profile. His bid faced the opposition of the apparatus, including Abel Caballero.

He was included in the 5th slot of the PSdG-PSOE list in Pontevedra for the 2016 Galician regional election, but he failed to be elected. He was sworn in as member of the Parliament of Galicia on 31 July 2019, covering a vacant seat.
