= Galician Socialist Space =

Galician Socialist Space Espazo Socialista Galego
- Leader: Xoán Carlos Bascuas
- Founded: 2008
- Split from: Nationalist Left
- Student wing: Movemento Estudantil Universitario; Comités (until 2010)
- Youth wing: Galician Nationalist Youth (until 2010); Galician Socialist Youth
- Ideology: Galician nationalism Democratic socialism Republicanism; Federalism
- National affiliation: Máis Galiza and Compromiso por Galicia

Galician Socialist Space (Galician: Espazo Socialista Galego, ESG) is a Galician political party integrated in Máis Galiza and Compromiso por Galicia.

== History ==
ESG was founded in 2008 as a split of Nationalist Left (EN), with about 85 of the 300 militants that EN has at the time. Among their current members there are also people who previously had not militants in the Galician Nationalist Bloc (BNG). ESG defines itself as a defender of the right of self-determination and of sustainable development. The official ideology of the party is secularism, republicanism, multiculturalism, Galician nationalism and socialism.

Integrated into the Máis BNG platform to participate in the 2009 National Assemblyof the BNG, was subsequently one of the members and founders of the critical current inside the BNG Máis Galiza. ESG left the BNG along with Máis Galiza, being their leader, Xoán Carlos Bascuas, the current leader of Máis Galiza and was the candidate of Compromiso por Galicia to the presidency of the Xunta de Galicia in the Galician elections of 2012.
