= Nationalist Left – Youth =

Nationalist Left – Youth Esquerda Nacionalista - Mocidade
- Founded: 1994
- Dissolved: 2008
- Headquarters: Santiago de Compostela, Galicia
- Ideology: Galician nationalism Democratic socialism Galician independence
- Mother party: Galician Nationalist Bloc
- International affiliation: European Free Alliance Youth
- Website: esquerdanacionalista.com/mocidade (Archive)

Nationalist Left – Youth (in Galician: Esquerda Nacionalista - Mocidade) was the youth wing of Nationalist Left (EN), one of the member parties of the Galician Nationalist Bloc (BNG). It organized the young party members. EN-Mocidade was founded in 1984, and worked within the youth wing of BNG, Galiza Nova.

EN-Mocidade published Manesquerda.

In 2008 the organization dissolved itself and formed the Galician Socialist Youth.
