= Nationalist Left =

Nationalist Left Esquerda Nacionalista
- Leader: Xosé Chorén
- Founder: Xosé Manuel Beiras
- Founded: 1992
- Dissolved: 2012
- Merged into: Máis Galiza, Compromiso por Galicia
- Newspaper: En Galiza
- Student wing: Comités Abertos de Faculdade (until 2008), Comités (after 2008)
- Youth wing: Nationalist Left - Youth (until 2008)
- Ideology: Galician nationalism Left-wing nationalism Democratic socialism Galician independence Europeanism

Website
- www.esquerda-nacionalista.eu (archived)

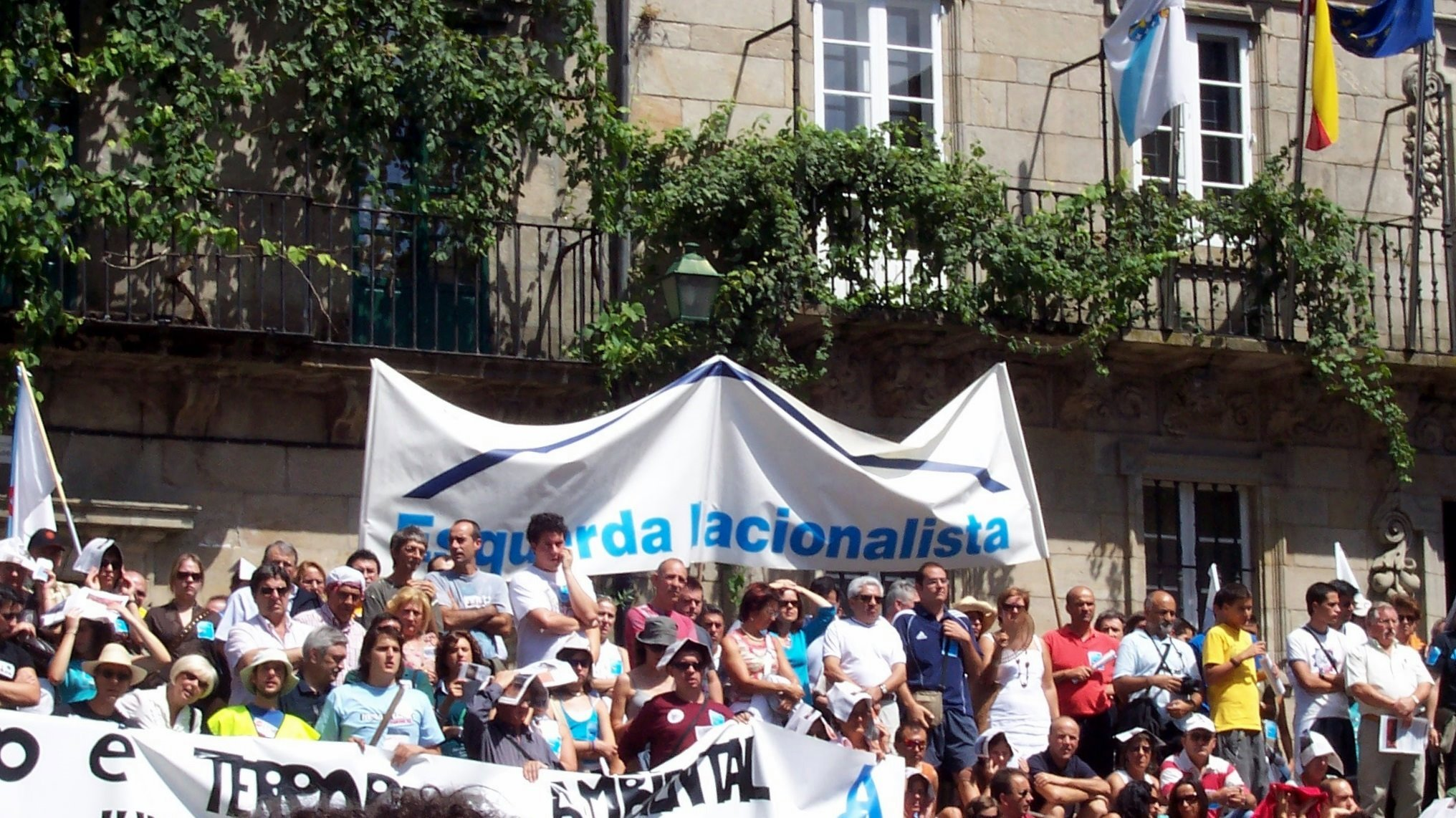
Pancarta de Esquerda Nacionalista

Nationalist Left (EN, Esquerda Nacionalista in Galician language) was a Galician political party formed in 1992. The party had about 600 members in 2002. EN was part of the Galician Nationalist Bloc (BNG) from its foundation to February 2012. On 14 April 2012 the organization was dissolved and its members joined the Máis Galiza party.

== History and characteristics ==
EN advocated for the independence of Galiza and the gradual reintegration of Galician and Portuguese. EN supported "Yes" in the referendum on the Treaty of the European Constitution, despite the fact that the BNG supported "No". The top party organs are the National Executive and the National Bureau.

In sixth National Assembly, held in Santiago de Compostela on 30 March 2008, Xosé Chorén and Alberte Xullo Rodríguez Feixoo were elected as the National Secretary and the Party president respectively. However, some of the party did not recognize the VI National Assembly, including Nationalist Left - Youth. Due to this, Nationalist Left - Youth split from the party along with some senior militants, going on to found a new party, the Galician Socialist Space.

En Galiza was its official magazine and EN promoted the Enclave Foundation.
