= Movemento pola Base =

- Leader: Anxo Abraira
- Founded: 2009
- Youth wing: Until 2009: Isca! Since 2009: none
- Ideology: Galician nationalism Socialism; Galician independence Antiimperialism
- Political position: Left-wing
- National affiliation: Until 2009: BNG; Since 2012: Anova-Nationalist Brotherhood
- Trade union affiliation: Confederación Intersindical Galega

Website
- polabase.net

Movemento pola Base (English: Movement for the Grassroots, MpB) is a Galician pro-independence and left-wing political organization. The MpB was born in the summer of 2006 from a group of militants of the Galician Nationalist Bloc (BNG), critical with the political line of the organization at the time.

== History ==
=== Origins ===
The participation of the BNG in a government with the Galician Socialist Party (PSdG) in the Xunta de Galicia created a critical current in the nationalist front. Some members of the BNG felt that the political line and the actions of the party deviated from the historical principles of the organization. The same happened in the youth of the BNG, Galiza Nova, where Isca! appeared as a critical organization.

In 2006 finally several militants of the Galician People's Union decided to leave that party to create a new organization within the BNG, under the name of Movemento pola Base (MpB). They were joined by independent militants of the BNG (not attached to any internal group or party) militants and members off the Confederación Intersindical Galega in the comarcas of Ferrolterra, Compostela and Vigo, among them Antolín Alcántara, Fermín Paz, Manuel Mera and Ramiro Oubiña, who were part of the executive of the CIG.

The MpB presented then its own candidacy to the National Council of the BNG, that was chosen in the XII National Assembly of the BNG. The list was headed by Fermín Paz and Paula Castro, and finally got 245 votes (9.32% of the total) and 5 representatives in the National Council. The MpB criticized what they considered a drift towards homogeneity in the BNG. On 28 October 2007, the MpB formally constitutes itself as a political organization, being defined ideologically as "independentist" and socialist and as a working class organization.

=== Rupture of the MpB ===
Between the months of December 2008 and January 2009 this current split between those in favor of creating a new political formation outside of the BNG and those who advocated to continue within that front. It was also an important element in the division the role of MpB in the CIG and its relations with the UPG within this union. The two factions claimed their legitimacy and the use of the name Movemento pola Base.

The faction that used as its communication channel the website polabase.net held a national assembly on February 7, 2009 where it was decided to abandon the BNG as the electoral platform of the organization and expressed the need for a new sovereigntist organization with presence in the institutions. This faction definitely abandoned the BNG on March 14, 2009. After the members of the Movement for Base who used the domain polabase.net had abandoned the BNG, the majority sector of the Movemento pola Base that remained in the BNG (polabase.org) decided to give up the acronym and name, to avoid greater confrontation, and created a new organization called the Galician Movement for Socialism.

=== Anova-Nationalist Brotherhood ===
In 2012 the MpB joined Anova-Nationalist Brotherhood In 2014 the MpB supported a coalition with United Left to the European elections of 2014.
