= Flag of Galicia =

Flag of Galicia, Spain

Galicia
- Use: State flag
- Proportion: 2:3
- Adopted: 6 April 1981 (Current version)
- Design: White field with a blue diagonal band crossing the flag from the top-left corner to the bottom-right with the Galician coat of arms in the center.
- Use: Civil flag
- Proportion: 2:3
- Design: White field with a blue diagonal band crossing the flag from the top-left corner to the bottom-right.

The flag of Galicia (Galician: bandeira de Galicia; Spanish: bandera de Galicia), an autonomous community in northwestern Spain, consists of a white field intersected by a celestial blue diagonal band. The institutional flag incorporates the Galician coat of arms over the civil design.

Law 5/1984 of the Xunta de Galicia regulates its dimensions, establishing a proportion of 2:3 and setting the diagonal band's width to one-quarter of the flag's total height. Vexillological protocol dictates that citizens may use the civil flag, but public administrations must display the institutional version during official events.

== History ==
=== Armorials and early naval ensigns ===
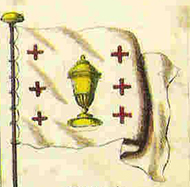
18th-century naval ensign of the Galician squadron, featuring the chalice and crosses.

The earliest vexillological symbols associated with Galicia rely on the chalice motif. The 13th-century English Segar's Roll depicts the arms of the King of Galicia as three golden chalices on a blue field. This constitutes canting arms, relying on the phonetic similarity between the Norman words calice and Galyce. The motif transitioned from a closed reliquary in 15th-century armorials to an open chalice with added crosses in the 16th century, visible in Albrecht Dürer's "Triumphal Arch of Maximilian" (1515).

By the 17th century, the Galician naval squadron utilized a white ensign displaying a golden chalice flanked by red crosses, following a 1647 decree by Philip IV. This standard appears in 18th-century Dutch and French maritime catalogs, including Petrus Schenk's 1711 Schouw-park aller Scheeps-Vlaggen and Denis Diderot's Encyclopédie.

=== The Cross of Saint James ===
The Cross of Saint James, utilized by the Santa Irmandade and emigrant military units.

Historical documentation also links the region to the Cross of Saint James. The Santa Irmandade mobilized under the red Banner of Santiago during the 15th-century Irmandiño wars. Emigrant military units, including the Tercio de Gallegos during the 1806 defense of Buenos Aires, utilized a white standard bearing the regional arms on the obverse and the Cross of Saint James on the reverse. According to historian Manuel Murguía, the Batallón Literario deployed a plain white flag during the 1808 Peninsular War.

=== The modern diagonal band ===
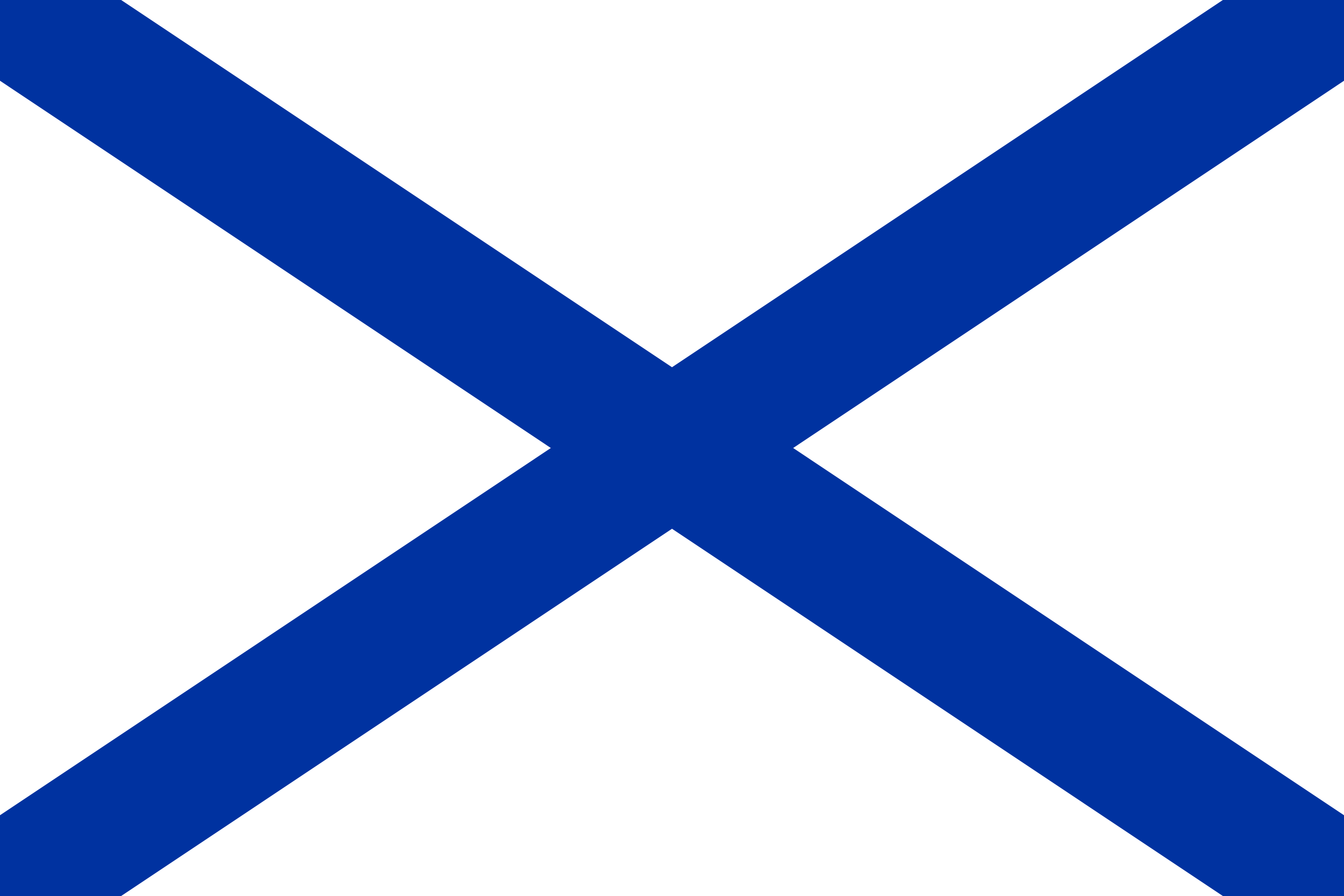
The maritime flag of A Coruña before (left) and after 1891 (right). The saltire was modified to a single diagonal band to avoid confusion with the Imperial Russian Navy's St. Andrew's flag.

The exact causality of the current diagonal blue band remains a subject of historiographical debate, divided between a maritime origin and an intellectual creation during the Rexurdimento.

The maritime narrative links the design to the province of A Coruña. In September 1845, this maritime province adopted a blue saltire on a white field. The Imperial Russian Navy formally protested this design due to its identical appearance to the Russian naval jack. A Spanish government decree on June 22, 1891, removed one arm of the saltire to resolve the diplomatic dispute, resulting in a single diagonal band. According to this theory, Galician emigrants departing from the port of A Coruña adopted this naval flag as the regional standard upon reaching the Americas.

An alternative origin places the creation of the flag directly within Galician intellectual circles. Documentation shows the white and blue diagonal flag was publicly displayed in Galicia by the Sociedade Económica de Amigos do País during the transfer of Rosalía de Castro's remains between May 25 and 27, 1891. Because this event predates the naval decree modifying the A Coruña flag by nearly a month, historians attribute the specific design to Manuel Murguía. Emigrant organizations subsequently institutionalized the symbol; the Centro Gallego de La Habana paraded with the current flag on November 15, 1892.

=== Political suppression and codification ===
The Primo de Rivera and Francoist regimes legally and practically suppressed the flag, forcing its use into clandestine political and cultural circles. Small manufactured items bearing the colors, such as ashtrays, were routinely confiscated by authorities. Public display of the symbol led to judicial consequences; in 1971, the Tribunal de Orden Público sentenced a protestor in Vigo to over two years in prison for illegal propaganda after carrying the flag.

Following the Spanish transition to democracy, the Statute of Autonomy of Galicia recognized the flag in 1981. The Real Academia Galega standardized the modern iteration of the coat of arms in 1972, which the Xunta de Galicia officially integrated into the institutional flag through the Symbols Law of May 29, 1984.

== Design and specifications ==
The official chromatic values of the flag are codified by the Galician government. The central band utilizes a specific celestial blue, while the coat of arms incorporates dark blue, red and gold.

Scheme	Light Blue	White	Dark Blue	Red	Gold
Pantone	801 C	Safe	300 C	186 C	3975 C
RGB	0-153-204	255-255-255	0-91-191	216-17-38	188-172-11
CMYK	100-25-0-20	0-0-0-0	100-52-0-25	0-92-82-15	0-9-94-26

== Historical flags ==
A variety of historical standards and maritime ensigns represented the Kingdom of Galicia and its subsequent political entities prior to the standardization of the modern flag.

=== Standard of the Kingdom of Galicia ===
Left: Standard of the Kingdom of Galicia, derived from 15th-century armorials. Right: Flag of the Kingdom of Galicia as depicted in the 16th century.

During the Middle Ages and the early modern period, the Kingdom of Galicia was primarily represented by heraldic banners displaying its coat of arms. The earliest European armorials from the 13th century depicted three golden chalices on a blue field. This was an example of canting arms (a phonetic pun on the Norman words "Galice" and "calice"). Over the centuries, the design evolved. By the 15th and 16th centuries, the standard commonly featured a single covered chalice or pyx on a blue field, surrounded by a variable number of crosses.

=== Naval ensign ===
Galician maritime ensign as recorded in the 19th century.

The naval fleet of the Kingdom of Galicia, originally created to defend the Galician coasts, utilized a distinct maritime flag. In 1647, King Philip IV established that the squadron's flag should be white bearing the arms of the kingdom. Throughout the 18th and 19th centuries, this naval ensign—a white field with a covered golden chalice flanked by crosses (typically red)—frequently appeared in international maritime catalogs and flag charts.

=== Council of Galicia (1946) ===
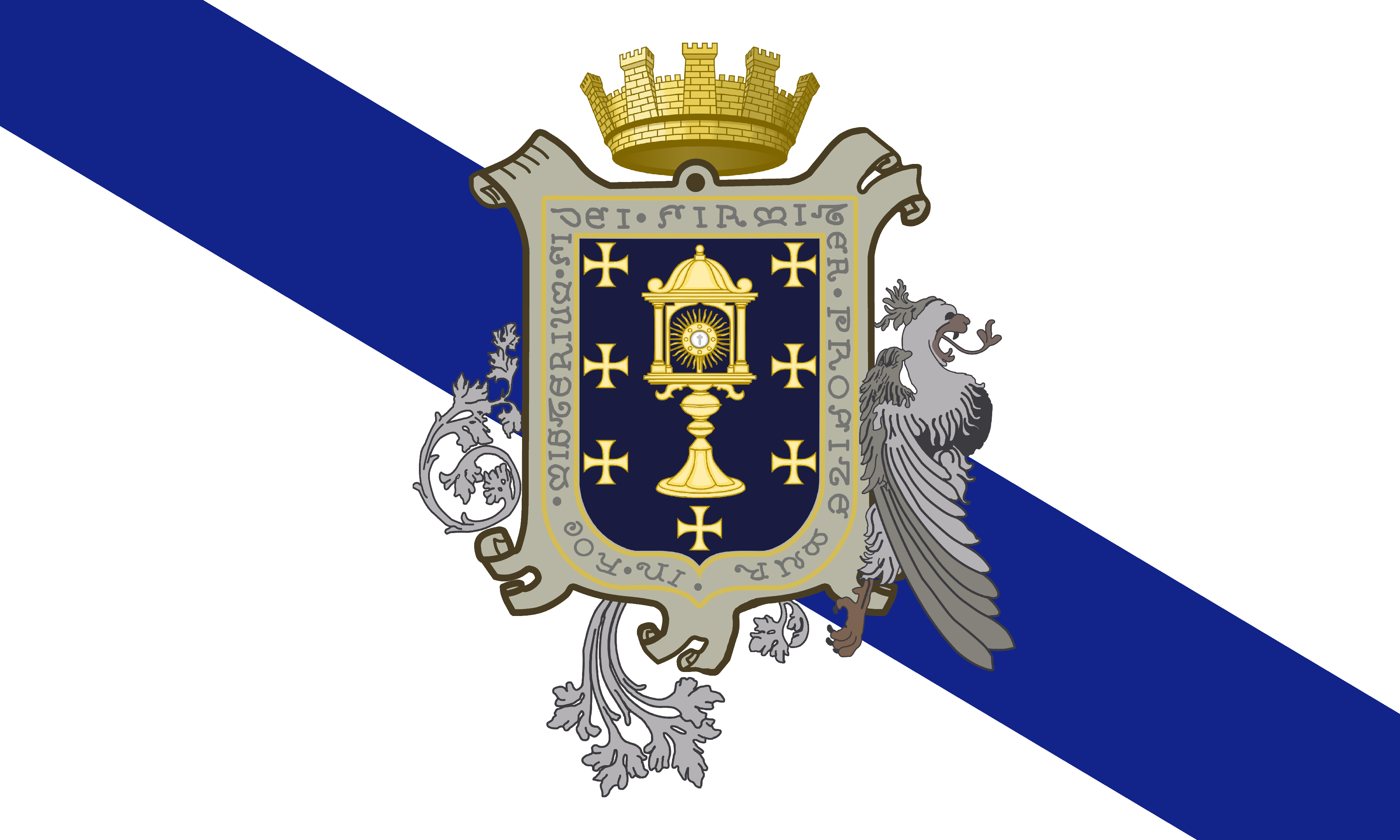
Flag utilized by the Council of Galicia, the exiled government in Montevideo (1946).

Following the Spanish Civil War, the Council of Galicia (Consello de Galiza) was established in November 1944 in Montevideo, Uruguay, acting as the Galician government-in-exile under the presidency of Castelao. In 1946, the Galician diaspora in South America presented the Council with an official flag. It utilized the modern white and blue diagonal design but featured a highly ornate, embroidered version of the Galician coat of arms in the center, incorporating a mural crown and heraldic supporters.

=== Emigrant diaspora flag ===
Galician diaspora flag, featuring the Cross of Saint James over the modern diagonal band.

During the 19th and early 20th centuries, Galician emigrant communities in the Americas (notably in Argentina, Uruguay, and Cuba) utilized a distinct variant of the flag. This design merged the modern diagonal blue band with the red Cross of Saint James (Cruz de Santiago) placed in the center.

The design is a product of vexillological syncretism. Before the modern blue-and-white diagonal flag was created in the late 19th century, earlier waves of Galician emigrants (such as the Tercio de Gallegos in 1806) had used a plain white flag featuring the Cross of Saint James. When the new diagonal design created by Manuel Murguía reached the Americas in the 1890s, diaspora institutions combined the two symbols, placing their traditional red cross over the new blue band.

This hybrid flag became the standard for major diaspora organizations, including the Centro Galego de Buenos Aires, which used it as its primary banner until at least 1912.

== Variant flags ==
=== Estreleira ===
The Estreleira, used by left-wing Galician nationalist groups.

The Estreleira (Galician for "starry flag"), also known as the bandeira da patria (flag of the fatherland), is a variant of the Galician flag featuring a red five-pointed star in the center. It is the primary symbol of left-wing Galician nationalism and the Galician independence movement.

The design consists of the standard official flag's blue diagonal band on a white field, with the red star superimposed in the center. Even though there are no universally standardized proportions for the star, it is typically aligned centrally over the blue band. The red star specifically represents socialism and sometimes communism.

The incorporation of a star into Galician symbology began in the early 20th century. Members of the Irmandades da Fala used stars in their correspondence, and Castelao included a white or silver star in early heraldic proposals. The historical Galicianist Party also occasionally utilized a flag with a yellow star. The first documented use of the Galician flag with a red star dates to 1936 during the Spanish Civil War. It was flown by the Galician Battalion of the Republican 5th Regiment, commanded by Enrique Líster. Alternative historical accounts from researchers associated with the Communist Party of Galicia suggest the flag was utilized in the 1940s by anti-Francoist guerrilla fighters led by Antonio Seoane Sánchez and José Gómez Gayoso.

The modern popularization of the Estreleira is attributed to the clandestine activism of the Unión do Povo Galego (UPG) during the 1960s and 1970s. The UPG adopted the symbol, reportedly drawing inspiration from the lone star of the Flag of Cuba. Today, the flag is widely displayed in popular demonstrations and political rallies by left-wing nationalist organizations, including the Bloque Nacionalista Galego (BNG), as well as trade unions like the Confederación Intersindical Galega (CIG) and the Central Unitaria de Traballadores (CUT).

=== Castelao's mermaid shield flag ===
Flag of Galicia with the mermaid shield designed by Castelao.

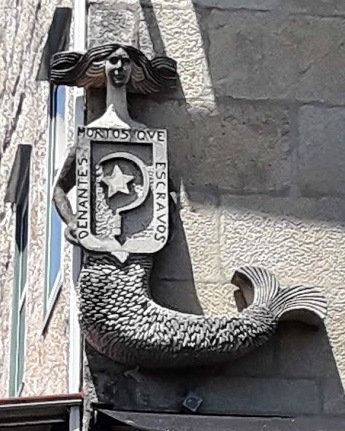
Mermaid shield on the facade of the Sociedade Cultural de Reboreda, in Redondela.

The "Mermaid flag" (Galician: Escudo da serea or Escudo de Castelao) is a patriotic emblem designed in 1937 by Galician intellectual and politician Alfonso Daniel Rodríguez Castelao. Created during his exile in Barcelona during the Spanish Civil War, it was intended as a secular, republican alternative to the traditional coat of arms of Galicia. Although never officially adopted, it became a prominent symbol for left-wing Galician nationalism and secular Galicianism.

Castelao proposed the design in the July 1937 issue of the magazine Nova Galiza in an article titled "The new symbols of the new Galicia" (Os novos símbolos da nova Galiza). He argued that traditional Galician symbols, such as the chalice and the crown, were closely tied to the Catholic Church, an institution that supported the Francoist faction during the war.

Before finalizing the design, Castelao considered and discarded several alternatives. He rejected the scallop shell due to its religious association with the Camino de Santiago, the triskelion because of its visual similarity to the swastika, and a crossed sickle and anchor to avoid imitating the communist hammer and sickle. He also dismissed combinations of natural elements like fish and wheat as lacking artistic merit.

The final design features a mermaid holding a shield, a figure inspired by traditional Galician heraldry, specifically the coat of arms of the Mariño de Lobeira lineage. The shield displays a golden sickle representing agricultural labor, a red star symbolizing freedom, and a blue background reflecting Galicia's Atlantic identity. It is accompanied by the motto "Denantes mortos que escravos" (Better dead than slaves), representing the resistance of the Galician people.

The symbol was heavily suppressed during Francoist Spain. It saw a resurgence during the Spanish transition to democracy and remains in use by various political and cultural organizations. A stylized version of Castelao's mermaid is currently used as the institutional logo of the Consello da Cultura Galega.

=== Plataforma Nunca Máis ===
Flag of the Plataforma Nunca Máis.

The "Nunca Máis" (Galician for "Never Again") flag is an environmentalist and protest variant of the Galician flag. It features the standard diagonal blue band but replaces the traditional white background with a solid black field. The black background represents mourning for the ecological devastation and visualizes the thick crude oil from a catastrophic spill.

Galician designer Xosé María Torné created the flag in 2002. It was immediately adopted as the primary symbol of the Plataforma Nunca Máis, a grassroots organization formed days after the oil tanker Prestige sank off the Galician coast. The flag represented the massive civil response to the disaster and was used to protest the crisis management by the authorities.

While it was originally created to demand resources for economic and environmental recovery following the Prestige incident, the platform and its flag were later reactivated in August 2006 to protest the 2006 Galician forest fires. The flag remains widely used in Galicia as a symbol of environmental protection and civil mobilization.

=== Suebic Kingdom reconstruction ===
Modern reconstruction of the Suebic Kingdom standard.

A flag featuring a green dragon and a red or purple lion rampant on a gold field is occasionally displayed by Galician independentist and Portuguese regionalist groups. Even though proponents claim it is the historical standard of the Kingdom of the Suebi (411–585), vexillological research indicates it is a modern reconstruction based on 17th-century heraldic myths rather than contemporary historical evidence.

There are no primary sources from the Suebic era documenting the use of these symbols. The attribution of the dragon and lion to the Suebi began in the 17th century with Portuguese historians like Bernardo de Brito. It was later referenced in a 1669 report to the Kingdom of Galicia by Juan Velo, a canon of the Lugo Cathedral, who described the arms of the Suebic kings as a green dragon and a red lion. This description was recovered in 1927 by the historian Pablo Pérez Costanti.

The modern flag design was created in 2003 by members of the Associaçom Galega da Língua (AGAL), including vexillologist José Manuel Barbosa Álvares, based on those earlier descriptions. It has since gained popularity online and among cultural associations as an alternative symbol of Galician identity, linking the shared history of Galicia and Northern Portugal, though it remains a contemporary cultural variant rather than a real historical artifact.

=== Antón Lezcano's cow flag ===
In contemporary popular culture, unofficial versions of the flag featuring a black silhouette of a rubia gallega (Galician Blond) cow, a traditional symbol of the region's rural and agricultural identity, are frequently displayed at festivals, concerts, and sporting events. Designed by Antón Lezcano as a secular and humorous response to the Spanish Osborne bull, the design utilizes the cow as an icon of Galician cultural pride and irony (retranca).

Semiotic analysis of the flag by Francesco Screti suggests it represents an ideological stance against centralism, specifically contrasting the Galician cow with the "Osborne bull" often associated with Spanish nationalism. The design gained significant public visibility during the 2002 Copa del Rey final (the Centenariazo), where Lezcano distributed hundreds of copies to fans to distinguish the Galician identity from that of Real Madrid.

== See also ==
- Coat of arms of Galicia
- Os Pinos – Anthem of Galicia
- Galician nationalism
- Alfonso Daniel Rodríguez Castelao
- St. Andrew's Cross – The basis for the original A Coruña maritime flag.
- Estelada – The Catalan equivalent of the Estreleira.
