= Galician Movement for Socialism =

Galician Movement for Socialism Movemento Galego ao Socialismo
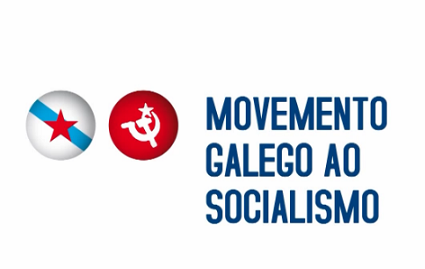
- Leader: Rafa Villar
- Founded: 2009
- Dissolved: 2021
- Succeeded by: Arredist Movement
- Student wing: Erguer-Estudantes da Galiza
- Youth wing: Isca!
- Ideology: Galician nationalism Communism; Feminism; Galician independence Euroscepticism
- Political position: Far-left
- National affiliation: BNG
- Trade union affiliation: Confederación Intersindical Galega
- Galician Parliament: 1 / 75 Inside the BNG

Website
- mgs.gal

The Galician Movement for Socialism (MGS, Movemento Galego ao Socialismo in Galician language) was a Galician communist, pro-independence and feminist organization. The MGS was born in March 2009, although its origins go back to the summer of 2006. The MGS works inside the Galician Nationalist Bloc and the Confederación Intersindical Galega.

== History ==
The History of Galician Movement for Socialism can be divided into three basic periods:

- The period from the summer of 2006 and December 2008, where the militants of that what later would become the MGS were part of the Movemento pola Base, an internal political current that supported socialism, independence and a BNG based in the assemblies.
- The period between December 2008 and March 2009, in which, after the rupture with part of the Movemento pola Base, that would finally left the BNG the militants that later would create the MGS maintain the name of the previous organization, a situation that causes a legal conflict with the other Movemento pola Base.
- The period between March 2009 and the present, in which the MGS establishes and thickens its social base and influence. This period i marked by the growing influence of the MGS in the BNG, specially after the rupture of 2012. The MGS also gained a very big influence in the galician student movement after the foundation of the Galician Student League (LEG), that the MGS considers its reference in the university.

=== The opposition to the drift of the BNG ===
The first period can be defined as opposition to what is considered a move away of the Galician Nationalist Bloc from some of its key objectives, especially the National sovereignty and its leftist ideology. The political praxis of the BNG in the PSOE in the bipartite Xunta de Galicia (2005-2009) caused that militants of the Galician People's Union decided to leave that party to create a new organization within the BNG, under the name of Movemento pola Base (MpB). They were joined by independent militants of the BNG (not attached to any internal group or party) militants and members off the Confederación Intersindical Galega in the comarcas of Ferrolterra, Compostela and Vigo, among them Antolín Alcántara, Fermín Paz, Manuel Mera and Ramiro Oubiña, who were part of the executive of the CIG.

The MpB presented then its own candidacy to the National Council of the BNG, that was chosen in the XII National Assembly of the BNG. The list was headed by Fermín Paz and Paula Castro, and finally got 245 votes (9.32% of the total) and 5 representatives in the National Council. The MpB criticized what they considered a drift towards homogeneity in the BNG. On 28 October 2007, the MpB formally constitutes itself as a political organization, being defined ideologically as "independentist" and socialist and as a working class organization.

=== Internal rupture of the MpB ===
Between the months of December 2008 and January 2009 this current split between those in favor of creating a new political formation outside of the BNG and those who advocated to continue within that front. It was also an important element in the division the role of MpB in the CIG and its relations with the UPG within this union. The two factions claimed their legitimacy and the use of the name Movemento pola Base.

The faction that used as its communication channel the website polabase.net held a national assembly on February 7, 2009 where it was decided to abandon the BNG as the electoral platform of the organization and expressed the need for a new sovereigntist organization with presence in the institutions. This faction definitely abandoned the BNG on March 14, 2009. After the members of the Movement for Base who used the domain polabase.net had abandoned the BNG, the majority sector of the Movemento pola Base that remained in the BNG (polabase.org) decided to give up the acronym and name, to avoid greater confrontation, and created a new organization called the Galician Movement for Socialism.

=== Birth of the MGS as a new political project ===
The Galician Movement for Socialism formally constituted on March 20, 2009. The difference between MpB and the MGS was primarily strategic and not ideological, the MGS considered that it could perform a recovery of the original leftist and sovereigntist fundamental principles of the BNG.

In February 2010 the formal presentation of the party took place during the First National Meeting of the MGS, which was held in the galician municipality of Teo, A Coruña. At that meeting, the militancy officially set the ideological positions of the MGS. The MGS currently has several town councillors (inside the list of the Galician Nationalist Bloc) in the towns and cities of Galiza like Santiago de Compostela, Ourense, Ribadeo, ...

In the Galician elections of 2016 the party elected its first representative in the Galician Parliament: Noa Presas Bergantiños, in the electoral district of Ourense.

== Structure ==
The MGS is an assembly organization based in different assemblies of area (comarcas level), with ability to set the political strategy of the national organization.

== Presence in other organizations ==
The MGS continues the analysis made in the early days of the MpB which led to the rejection of a marginalist strategy. The goal is to have social presence and presence in those organisms associated with left-wing Galician nationalism nominally in the BNG and the CIG.

The presence in the BNG, MGS has two of the fifteen members of the National Executive. As for the presence in the CIG the MGS is part of the majority candidacy that was presented to the V Confederal Congress, having several representants in the executive. The MGS has a very strong presence in the comarcas of Ferrolterra, Compostela and Vigo, and its influence in the local BNG and CIG assemblies is notable.
