= Movemento Estudantil Universitario =

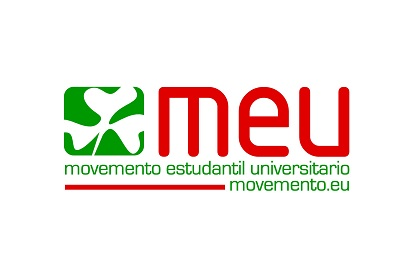
- Founded: 1995 and again in 2010
- Headquarters: Santiago de Compostela, Galicia
- Ideology: Galician nationalism Social democracy Progressivism
- Mother party: Máis Galiza

Movemento Estudantil Universitario (MEU, University Student(s) Movement or Student Universitarian Movement in English language) was a student union representative of college students with presence in the universities of Galicia. Born in December 2010, its main goal was a single, public, Galician, international and democratic university in Galicia.

== History ==
In 1994, in reaction to what was perceived as the Galician People's Union control over the CAF, a group of students created a new student union called Movemento Estudantil Universitario. In the middle 90s it was one of the most important student unions of Galicia. The original MEU disappeared in the late 1990s due to the lack of new militants.

In 2010 a new group of students, with the same motivations that those of the 1990s, decided to recover the project of the MEU. These group of students broke with the Comités and formed a new MEU. In 2011 Comités suffered other major split, that resulted in the formation of the more left-wing Galician Student League. The new MEU didn't have the success of the original one. In 2012 the organization gained a seat in the Council of the University of Santiago de Compostela. The new MEIU disappeared between 2013 and 2014 but was not officially dissolved, like in the 90s. The new MEU was linked with Máis Galiza (until 2012) and Compromiso por Galicia (2012–2014) and with their youth wing, the Galician Nationalist Youth.
