= Estreleira =

Galician left-wing nationalist flag

- Bandeira da patria
- Use: Civil flag
- Proportion: 2:3
- Adopted: 1936 (Earliest documented use); 1960s (Standardization)
- Design: The civil flag of Galicia defaced with a five-pointed red star in the center.

The estreleira (also known as the bandeira da patria) is a flag utilized by left-wing Galician nationalist and independentist movements. The design consists of the civil flag of Galicia (a white field intersected by a celestial blue diagonal band) defaced with a five-pointed red star in the center. The red star is a traditional political symbol representing socialism and communism.

== History ==
=== Origins and early usage ===
The integration of a star into Galician national symbology predates the modern estreleira. Prior to the Spanish Civil War, intellectual and artist Castelao incorporated a white or silver star, alongside a sickle, into his secular proposal for the Galician coat of arms.

The earliest documented physical use of the blue and white flag featuring a red star dates to 1936. According to Galician writer Xosé Luís Méndez Ferrín, the standard was carried by the Batallón Galego (Galician Battalion) of the Fifth Regiment, a military unit of the Spanish Republican Army commanded by Enrique Líster. Alternative historiographical claims from researchers affiliated with the Communist Party of Galicia suggest that anti-Francoist guerrillas led by Antonio Seoane Sánchez and José Gómez Gayoso utilized a similar red-star flag during the 1940s, while the historic Partido Galeguista utilized a variant with a yellow star.

=== Standardization by the UPG ===
The modern configuration and widespread adoption of the estreleira is attributed to the Galician People's Union (UPG). During the 1960s, communist militants within the UPG standardized the addition of the red star to the Galician flag. This design choice aligned the Galician national liberation movement with international socialist aesthetics, drawing visual parallels to the flags of Yugoslavia and Cuba.

== Modern usage and specifications ==
The estreleira is universally adopted as a political symbol by left-wing nationalist and independentist organizations in Galicia. Political parties such as the Bloque Nacionalista Galego (BNG), Galician People's Front (FPG), and Causa Galiza utilize the flag in official capacities and public demonstrations. It is equally prominent in the labor movement, serving as a primary symbol for nationalist trade unions like the Confederación Intersindical Galega (CIG) and the Central Unitaria de Traballadores (CUT).

Unlike the official institutional flag of Galicia, the estreleira lacks legally codified dimensions. Vexillological convention places the red star in the exact center of the field, intersecting the diagonal blue band.

== See also ==
- Flag of Galicia
- National and regional identity in Spain
- Estelada
