= Erguer-Estudantes da Galiza =

Erguer. Estudantes da Galiza
- Founded: 5 March 2016
- Headquarters: Santiago de Compostela, Galicia
- Ideology: Galician nationalism Socialism; Feminism; Galician independence
- Website: http://erguer.gal/gl/

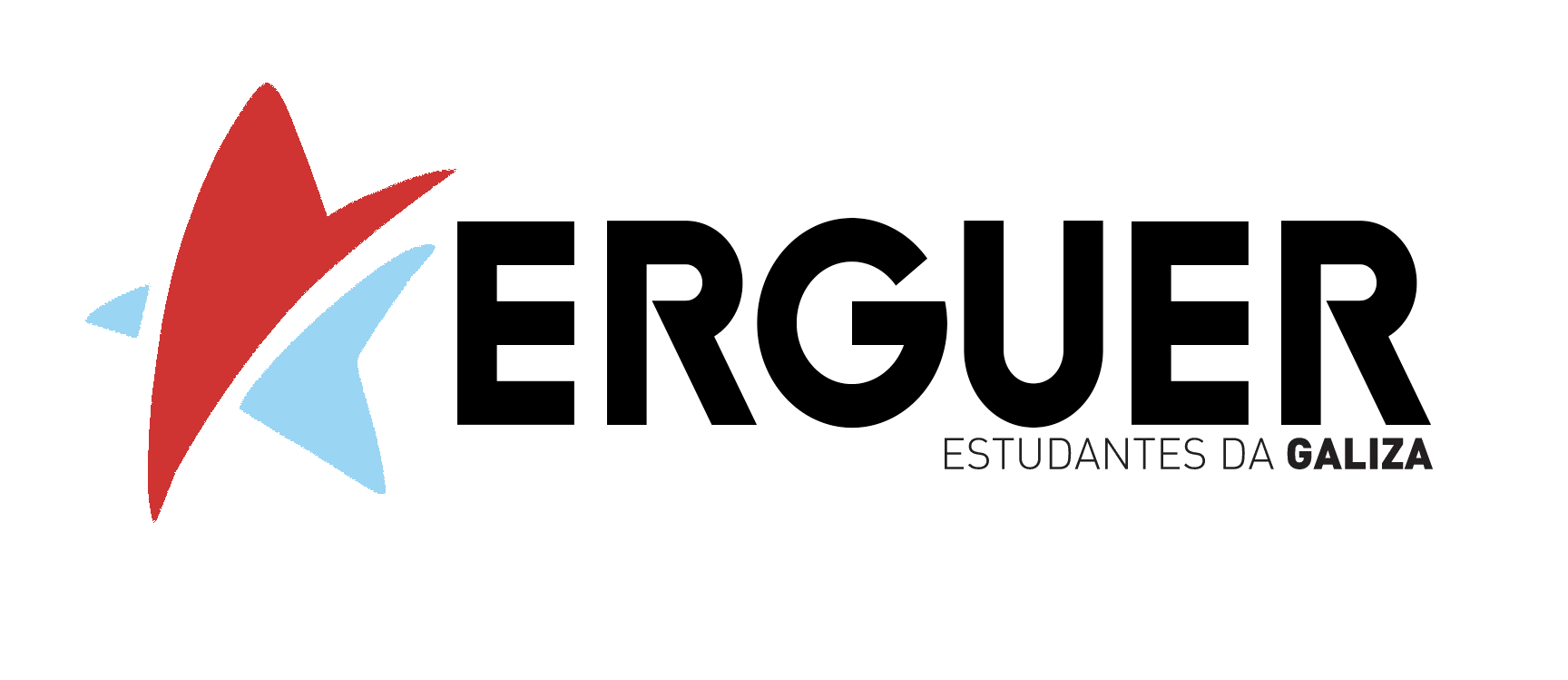
Logo of the Erguer-Estudantes da Galiza

Erguer. Estudantes da Galiza (Rise Up. Students of Galicia in Galician) is a Galician student union that advocates for accessible, high-quality public education in Galician (as opposed to Spanish). The organization describes its goals as universal, democratic, secular, inclusive, feminist, and anti-patriarchal. Erguer is open to high school, vocational, and university students across Galicia and also supports Galician independence and the establishment of a Galician republic.

== History ==
Erguer was founded on March 5, 2016, at the Colexio de Fonseca of the University of Santiago de Compostela through the merger of three Galician nationalist student organizations: the Galician Student League, AGIR and Comités. Following its inaugural assembly, Erguer's first public action was calling for a nationwide general student strike in Galicia on April 13, 2016.
