= Galician Socialist Youth =

Galician Socialist Youth Mocidade Socialista Galega
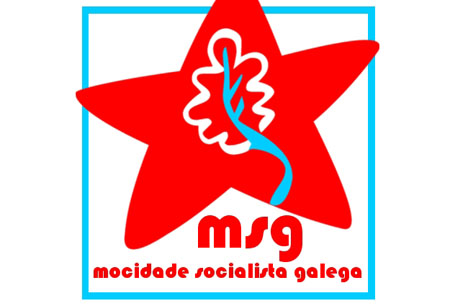
- Founded: 2009
- Headquarters: Santiago de Compostela, Galicia
- Ideology: Galician nationalism Social democracy Democratic socialism Europeanism; Republicanism
- Mother party: Galician Socialist Space
- Website: mocidadenacionalistagalega.org

Galician Socialist Youth (MSG, Mocidade Socialista Galega in Galician language), was a youth political organization founded on April 25, 2009 in the city of Santiago de Compostela, that acted as the youth of the Galician Socialist Space. The organization self-dissolved and transformed itself in the Galician Nationalist Youth (MNG) in November 2010.

The MSG was integrated in Galiza Nova and the Galician Nationalist Bloc. In 2009 the organization presented a candidacy, called Entre tod@s, Galiza Nova, in the National Assembly of Galiza Nova to the National Direction. The candidacy got the 20% of the vote and 5 seats in the National Direction. The main goal of the MGS inside Galiza Nova was to change the organization and to decrease the power that the Galician People's Union had inside the organization.
