= Comités Abertos de Estudantes =

Student union

- Founded: 1990
- Headquarters: Santiago de Compostela, Galicia
- Ideology: Galician nationalism Socialism; Progressivism
- Mother party: Galician Nationalist Bloc

Comités Abertos de Estudantes (CAE, Students Open Committees in English) was a Galician nationalist and left-wing student union, formed by high school, bachillerato and professional formation students. On May 10, 2008, CAE dissolved itself to form, along with the Comités Abertos de Faculdade (CAF), a new student union, Comités.

The organization was founded in 1990 as an extension to the middle school of the CAF project, coinciding with the elections to the Galician School Board.
