= Comités Abertos de Faculdade =

Defunct student organization of Galiza

- Founded: 1988
- Headquarters: Santiago de Compostela, Galicia
- Ideology: Galician nationalism Socialism; Progressivism
- Mother party: Galician Nationalist Bloc

Comités Abertos de Faculdade (CAF, Open Faculty Committees in English) was a student organization of Galiza. Formed from the union of different faculty assemblies. The main goals of the CAF were defending quality and the Galician language public education. It was an assembly-based organization. The CAF were considered the heirs of the ERGA.

== Composition ==
The CAF traditionally incorporated almost all the nationalist left organizations operating at the university (Galician Nationalist Bloc, Galician Socialist Party-Galician Left, MCG, Communist Party of the Galician People...), but with the integration of most of these groups into the Galician Nationalist Bloc the organization ended being formed mainly by militants of Galiza Nova and people without party affiliation.

== History ==
During the effervescence of the student struggles at the University of Santiago de Compostela, in the early 1980s, a number of Assemblies of Center emerged and united around the year of 1986 in the Comités Abertos (Open Committees, although some, such as the CAMAE, will remain semi-autonomous). Although theoretically the CA covered the whole university, in practice it was an organization with a very strong presence in Santiago de Compostela and marginal on the other campuses. It was only incethe segregation of the universities of A Coruña and Vigo when the organization began to have presence in all the (seven) campus. The origins worked at the Faculty Assembly and a coordinating body (Campus Council) made up of two people from each school.

Since its establishment, with the dissolution of ERGA, in 1988, the CAF grew and became the most important student union in Galiza, present in almost all the academic institutions with student representation.

In the 90's, the CAF suffered a split from the Movemento Estudantil Universitario (MEU), in reaction to what they denounced as the Galician People's Union control of the organization. The CAF managed to recover its presence slightly, specially after the disappearance of the MEU.

In 2008, the internal crises of CAE and the CAF led to their unification in a new project, the Comités.
