= FRUGA =

- Galician Rural Federation
- Federación Rural Galega
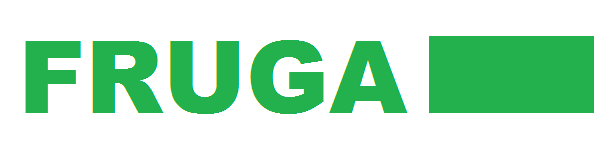
- Logo
- Founded: 2009
- Headquarters: Santiago de Compostela
- Location: Galicia
- Key people: Xurxo Álvarez
- Website: fruga.org

The Galician Rural Federation (FRUGA, Federación Rural Galega in Galician language) is a Galician farmers and breeders union centered on family farms and small peasants. The organization has its origins in a split of the Sindicato Labrego Galego-Comisións Labregas (SLG) in 2009. The splitters, that later founded FRUGA, wanted the SLG to take a closer political line to the Galician Nationalist Bloc and the Galician People's Union. FRUGA is particularly strong among milk cows small farmers.

== Ideology ==
FRUAG has a Galician nationalist and left-wing ideology. The union has very strong links with the Galician Nationalist Bloc, the Confederación Intersindical Galega and the Galician People's Union. The union also supports cooperativism, food sovereignty, feminism, Galician independence and ecologism. FRUGA is a member of the Galician Rural Alliance, an organization whose main objective is to fight against mining projects in Galicia.
