= Asociación pola defensa da ría =

Spanish non-governmental organisation

The Asociación Pola Defensa da Ría (Association in Defence of the Ria) of Pontevedra, known as APDR, is a Galician local environmental non-governmental organisation created in 1987 to address the environmental degradation of Pontevedra's ria area. It has over 500 registered members and it holds substantial support within the local community.

Through its work, the APDR defends a model of sustainable development based in the rational use of sea and forest resources, and a tourism model not based in the idea of mass tourism. The organisation is open to any citizen interested in the rehabilitation of the ria and its adjacent areas. Most of its work is focused in the fight against the main polluting industries, such as the timbering company TAFISA (already relocated) and the pulp mill/paper mill and electrochemical complex ENCE-ELNOSA.

== Campaigns ==
The APDR currently has three main active campaigns:

- Paper mills: with a focus on the closure of the operations of the ENCE pulp mill/paper mill in Pontevedra's ria. Likewise, APDR opposes to the construction of new ENCE and Botnia pulp mills in Entre Ríos (Argentina) and Río Negro (Uruguay).
- Littoral modification: in particular rejecting the modifications to Marín's port and the construction of a new harbour in Bueu.
- Sustainable forest management. The APDR also focusses on ensuring that certifications awarded by the Forest Stewardship Council (FSC) follow the required criteria in the ria area, and that these are observed by the relevant authorities.

In addition to the mentioned campaigns, the APDR also entertains parallel campaigns related to the environment and health issues, such as the relation between mobile phone radiation and health, protection and rational development of the local seafood industry, etc.

== Collaborations ==
The APDR works in collaboration with a number of other environmental networks that aim to protect the environment, the Galician rivers Gafos, Lérez and Verdugo, and with particular citizens initiatives. The APDR, in association with some of these other groups and/or individuals, have submitted a series of environmental and urbanism proposals to the local government of Pontevedra.

From 1999, the APDR is member of the Galician Environmental Federation (Federación Ecoloxista Galega - FEG), and from 2002 of the civic platform Nunca Máis.

== Accomplished goals ==
The APDR initially managed to open investigations on the fulfilment of environmental regulations by ENCE. However, lack of support from the administration at that time reduced the effect of the APDR's early campaigns. It was only from 1999, with the arrival of a new governing team to Pontevedra's City Council, when APDR began to have institutional support and therefore was able to achieve specific goals.

The APDR critically backed the local government of Pontevedra, forming an environmental lobby, that eventually forced the relocation of the timbering company TAFISA. In the 2001-2002 period, the APDR also gained the support of the Galician government on the grounds of health and environmental concerts to speed up the process.

The local government of Pontevedra, in association with the Galician government and APDR, negotiated the eventual closure of the ENCE-ELNOSA complex. However, the agreed date of year 2018 was considered as "unacceptable" by the APDR, which is now trying to force an earlier closure of the company.

== Acknowledgements ==
In 2002 the APDR received the Cidade de Pontevedra prize, awarded by the Pontevedra City Council. In 2005 it received the Vidal Bolaño prize, awarded by the cultural organisation Redes Escarlata.

== See also ==
- Environmentalism
- Water pollution
- Paper pollution
- Pontevedra
- Ria
- Rias Baixas
