= Sindicato Labrego Galego-Comisións Labregas =

SLG
- Sindicato Labrego Galego-Comisións Labregas
- Galician Peasant Union – Peasant Commissions
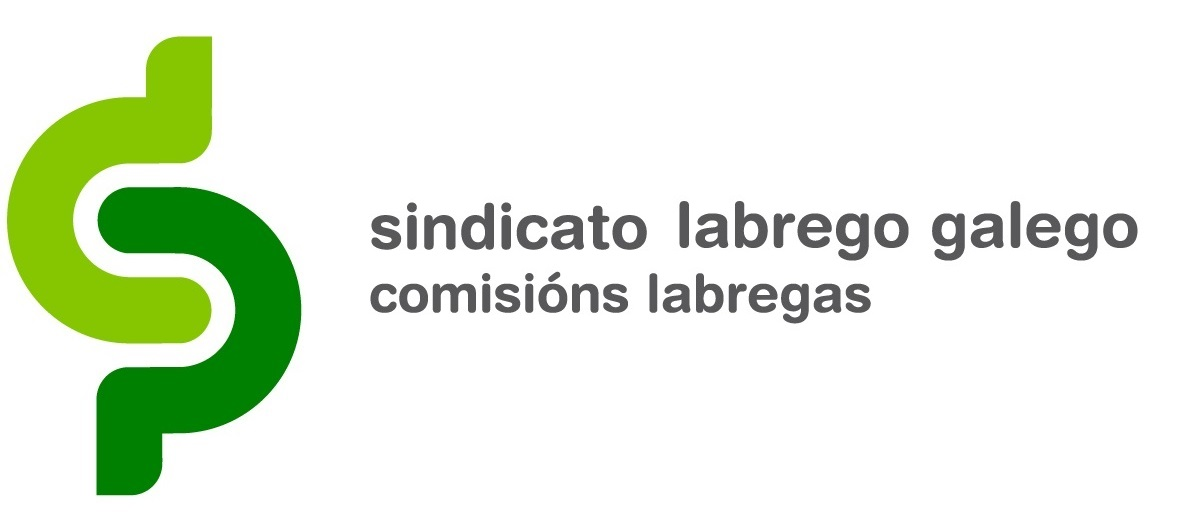
- Logo
- Founded: 1973 / legal organization since 1977
- Headquarters: Santiago de Compostela
- Location: Galicia
- Key people: Isabel Vilalba Seivane
- Affiliations: Via Campesina
- Website: sindicatolabrego.com

Sindicato Labrego Galego-Comisións Labregas (SLG, Galician Peasant Union – Peasant Commissions) is a Galician farmers' and breeders' union centered on family farms and small peasants.

== Ideology ==
The SLG has a Galician nationalist and left-wing ideology. The union supports cooperativism, mutual aid, food sovereignty, feminism, the anti-globalization movement, environmentalism and self-management.

== History ==
=== Clandestine era: 1973–1977 ===
The SLG was founded in 1973 under the name Comisiós Labregas (CCLL), with the union of several local Committees of Support of the Peasants Struggle (Comités de Axuda á Loita Labrega in Galician). The creation of the CCLL was supported by the Galician People's Union, that at the time tried to create a National-popular movement with sectoral organizations, like the Galician Workers Union, ADEGA, or the CCLL itself. Due to the Francoist regime the union was illegal, and its activities clandestine. In the winter of 1973 the official newspaper of the CCLL, Fouce (Sickle), appeared. In 1974 and 1975 the union experienced a significant growth. The main struggles during those years were the recovery of the Montes Comunais (territories that traditionally were a common property of a parroquia that had been nationalized by the state in the 19th and 20th centuries) and the struggle against the abusive payments to the Social Security network. The CCLL also organized protests, rallies and boycotts against the construction of dams on the Galician rivers, that flooded entire parroquias. A sector of the union, close to the Galician Socialist Party (PSG), split in 1975 and formed a new organization, the Sindicato Agrario Galego (SAG, Galician Agrarian Union).

In 1976, the CCLL created the Galician Agrarian Association (AGA) as their legal wing, thanks to the new association laws. Despite this, the first General Assembly of the AGA was banned by the authorities. The same year, a group of dissidents who were opposed to the Galician People's Union policies left the CCLL and formed Comisiós Labregas-Terra. The same year Comisiós Labregas decided to adopt the name Comisiós Labregas-Sindicato Labrego Galego (although the union maintained the acronym CCLL).

=== Legalization and growth: 1977–1986 ===
In 1977 three milestones happened in the history of the CCLL. The union was legalized in the spring of that year, and as a result the AGA was disbanded. The same year a conflict erupted between peasants and inhabitants of the parroquia of As Encrobas, Cerceda and the electric company Fenosa. Fenosa had expropriated the locals' land to mine lignite. The inhabitants of As Encrobas were against the expropriations. The local CCLL organized a large protest that transformed a local conflict into a problem for all Galicia. The peasants were led by Moncho Valcarce, the local priest and a member of the Galician People's Union. The resistance of the locals against Fenosa and the Guardia Civil became a symbol of the Galician peasants' struggle. In 1978 Fenosa, the CCLL, and the people of As Encrobas were finally defeated and the mine was built. The other main event of 1977 was the opposition to the nuclear power plant of Xove. That year a huge movement opposing the construction of the plant started. CCLL and ADEGA were the main organizers, although the Galician National-Popular Bloc also played a key role. On 10 April 1977 8,000 people marched from Viveiro to Xove against the plant. The struggle against the nuclear power plant continued until 1979 when, due to popular pressure (including another anti-nuclear march with 20,000 participants), the electric company decided not to build the plant there.

In 1978 elections to the Cámaras Agrarias The CCLL gained 545 representatives in Galicia. The same year the CCLL launched a campaign against the Cuota Empresarial, the company contribution, an amount of money that the Galician farmers had to pay to the social security despite the small and familiar character of their farms. This tax was considered abusive by the majority of the Galician farmers at the time. The CCLL supported not paying the tax, which led to a mass civil disobedience movement against the cuota. After 16 years of protests, in 1994, the Spanish government abolished the cuota.

=== Since 1986: opposition to the CAP and greater organizational independence ===
CCLL was against the entrance of Galicia in the Common Market, due to the dismantlement the Galician agrarian productive sectors faced with the Common Agricultural Policy. In fact, milk quotas and new taxes damaged the Galician agrarian sector during the second half of the 1980s, which saw the closing of many farms. The struggle against the milk quotas and taxes became the new focus of the CCLL. In 1989 the organization changed its name to Sindicato Labrego Galego-Comisións Labregas and its acronym to SLG. The same year Lidia Senra became the leader of the SLG, and remained in that position until 2007.

In the late 1990s the organization became more independent of the Galician People's Union and of the Galician Nationalist Bloc. The SLG joined Via Campesina and helped to create the anti-globalization movement in Galicia. The union also adopted a policy of promoting food sovereignty. During the 1990s the fight against the Common Agricultural Policy continued, with work stoppages, demonstrations and tractoradas (demonstrations of tractors for the purpose of blockading roads). During the 2000s there was an internal tension between the supporters of the Galician People's Union (UPG) and the Galician Nationalist Bloc and the sector that wanted a fully independent union. In 2009 the supporters of the UPG split and formed a new union, the FRUGA.

The SLG has continued to participate in the social movements since then, being one of the main organizers of the protests against the gold mine in Coristanco in 2013. Due to the massive opposition to the project, the Xunta de Galicia decided not to give the license to the mining company.
