= Plataforma Nunca Máis =

Spanish political movement

Nunca Máis
- Adopted: 2002
- Designed by: José María Torné

Nunca Máis (Galician: 'Never Again', Spanish: Nunca Más) is the name and slogan of a popular movement in Galicia (Spain) formed in response to the Prestige oil spill in 2002. The movement's banner is based on the Galician flag, but with a blue diagonal on a black field, rather than a blue diagonal on a white field. The movement describes itself as representing a broad swathe of civil society.

== Background ==
Nunca Máis organized a number of demonstrations to ensure the official recognition of Galicia as a catastrophe zone and the immediate resource base to repair the economic, social, environmental and health problems resulting from the disaster. It also called for the set in of motion of disaster prevention systems, in order to avoid disasters like this from occurring. The demonstrations were attended by thousands on successive days.

On August 11, 2006, the Plataforma Nunca Máis announced their reactivation to fight against the wave of forest fires that had been started throughout Galicia. A number of rallies in the Galician capital, Santiago de Compostela, were organised, with large numbers attending.

Nunca Máis acts as a co-ordinator of other associations, namely cultural, civic and ecologist associations. In this fashion, Nunca Máis could be considered as of being made up of a series of other associations, despite having its own directive board.

== See also ==
- Asociación pola defensa da ría
