= Coat of arms of Santiago de Compostela =

Heraldry symbol in Galicia, Spain

Coat of arms of Santiago de Compostela

The coat of arms of Santiago de Compostela represents Santiago de Compostela, in the province of A Coruña, Galicia, Spain. The coat of arms combines Galician heraldry with traditions related to the city of Santiago de Compostela.

It is currently regulated by Article 3, Title 1, of the Law of 24 June 2002, of the Capital Statute of Santiago de Compostela, published in the Bulletin of the Parliament of Galicia, number 150 of the sixth legislature.

== Background ==
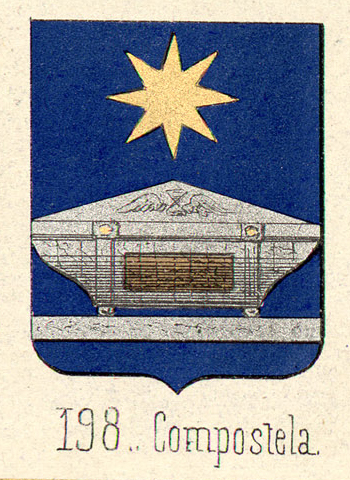
The traditional coat of arms of Santiago de Compostela

Its heraldic description (blazon) is as follows:

A divided shield: in the first, of azure, a gold chalice added to a silver host, and accompanied by seven crosses cut out of the same metal, three on each side and one in the center of the chief, which are the Arms of Galicia; in the second, of azure, a silver cloud added from the urn of the tomb of James the Apostle, surmounted by a gold star.

At the bell, an open Royal Crown, which is a gold circle, set with precious stones, composed of eight acanthus leaf finials, five visible interpolated with pearls. The crown lined gules.

The Cross of Saint James is attached, which is a cross fitchy, one whose lower limb comes to a point, with either a cross fleury, (Note: Citing the source in Galician "… o escudo de Santiago de Compostela está conformado por dos cuarteles, el derecho con las armas de Galicia, cáliz con Sagrada Hostia con siete cruces periféricas; y el izquierdo con sepulcro del Apóstol en mármol banco, con forma de arqueta sobre nubes, y en lo alto una estrella de oro radiante; sobre el escudo, una corona de los Reyes Católicos, por detrás, la Cruz Espada de Santiago.. Título I, artículo 3, Ley de Estatuto de Capitalidad de la ciuad de Santiago de Compostela."—Art. 3º, Tít.1º, del Estatuto de Capitalidad de la ciudad de Santiago de Compostela.)

The sinister half of the shield contains the coat of arms traditionally attributed to Santiago de Compostela before being codified in municipal regulations. The elements on the shield are emblems of the city; the azure tincture of the field is used by the Kingdom of Galicia. The central element of the field is the tomb of the Apostle James, represented on a cloud and placed below an eight-pointed star of gold (or). The sepulchre and the star allude to the medieval tradition that narrates the discovery of the remains of the apostle by Pelagius the Hermit, who claimed to have observed a mysterious brightness during several nights over the Libredón forest.

In the legislation that regulates the coat of arms of Santiago de Compostela, it is established that an open royal crown appears on crest, like the one used by the Catholic Monarchs. Old or open royal crowns (without diadems, orbs, or crosses) were used until the 16th century, but their use has continued in the heraldry of many Spanish towns and provinces.

== See also ==
- Coat of arms of Galicia
- Municipal Armorial of the province of La Coruña
