= Coat of arms of Galicia (Spain) =

- Armiger: Xunta de Galicia
- Adopted: 29 May 1984; 42 years ago
- Crest: Royal crown of Spain
- Shield: golden chalice (Holy Chalice); silver host, seven silver crosses

The coat of arms of Galicia is described in the Spanish Law 5 of 29 May 1984, the Law of the symbols of Galicia.

== Description ==
The coat of arms of Galicia includes, enclosed in a field of azure, a chalice of gold with a silver host, accompanied by seven silver crosses, three on each side and one in the center of the shield (representative of the seven historic provinces of Galicia).

The royal crown in gules, i.e. red, enclosed in a golden ring set with precious stones, made up of eight acanthus leaf fleurons, out of which five are visible. Each leaf is set with pearls, and five tiaras are born from them to converge in a globe of azure, with the semi-meridian and the equator in gold, topped by a golden cross.

== History ==
The historians Faustino Menéndez-Pidal and Juan José Sánchez Badiola find the first references to it in two rolls of arms from the late 13th century – in Segar's Roll and in the Armorial du Hérault Vermandois – which attribute the coat of arms to the king of Galicia, although by that time it no longer existed as a separate title. The first source describes three uncovered chalices, whereas the second only describes one covered chalice.

Since the Middle Ages, the concept of the chalice as a canting linguistic metaphor spread: chalice = Galice; many European authors eventually theorized about this fact from the 16th to the 18th centuries, a fact the Romanticist Galician author Manuel Murguía would later echo. Later rolls of arms also make reference to it, e.g. the Armorial Gymnich of Flanders (1445), and, especially, the Armorial Bergshammar, a compilation of some 3300 coats of arms belonging to states and families of almost all over Europe as of 1436. In that roll of arms it says "in the fourth turned sheet... a well-stylized big cup occupying as much space of the field as possible". Above the composition the word Galiscién (Galicia) is written.

The most ancient remaining representations of the coat of arms in Galician civil architecture are also from the 15th century depicted in the Royal hospital of Santiago de Compostela, Betanzos town hall, Corunna walls, Lugo Cathedral's organ, Noia Church's tower, Moscosos residence in Laxe.

From the 16th century onwards, crosses were added around the chalice as ornamentation.

Joseph de Avilés, in "Heroic science", defined the coat of arms: "The kingdom of Galicia in Spain includes a field of azure with scattered crosses and a big golden cup and chalice".

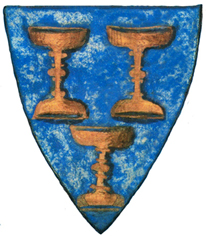
Coat of arms of the kings of Galicia (Segar's Roll). 13th century.

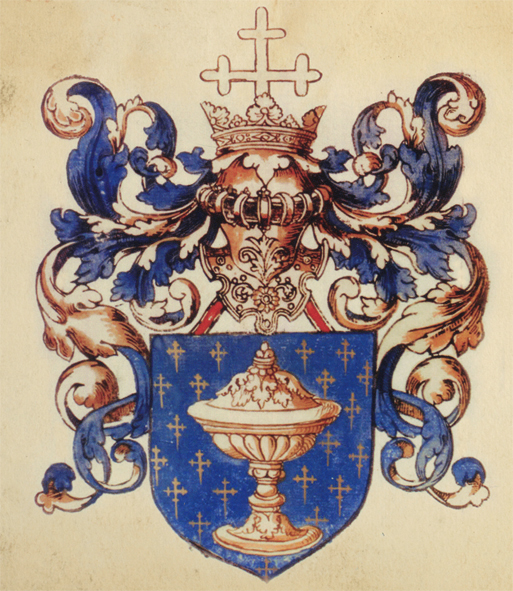
Coat of arms of the Kingdom of Galicia (L'armorial Le Blancq, c. 1560 AD).

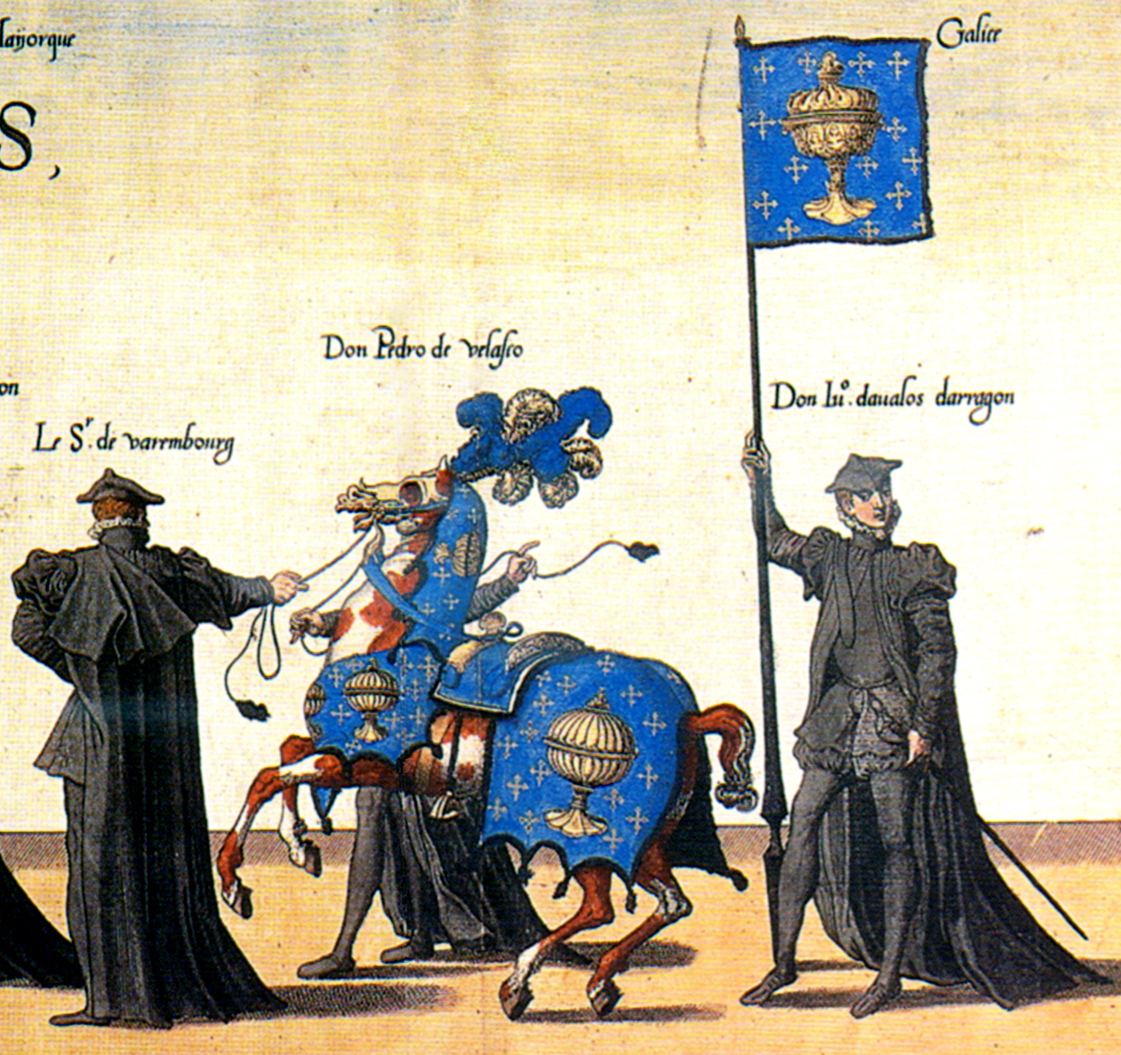
Flag and arms of the Kingdom of Galicia (16th century). The picture shows the funerals of the emperor Charles V, also king of Galicia (Funerals of Charles V, by Lucas Doetecum).

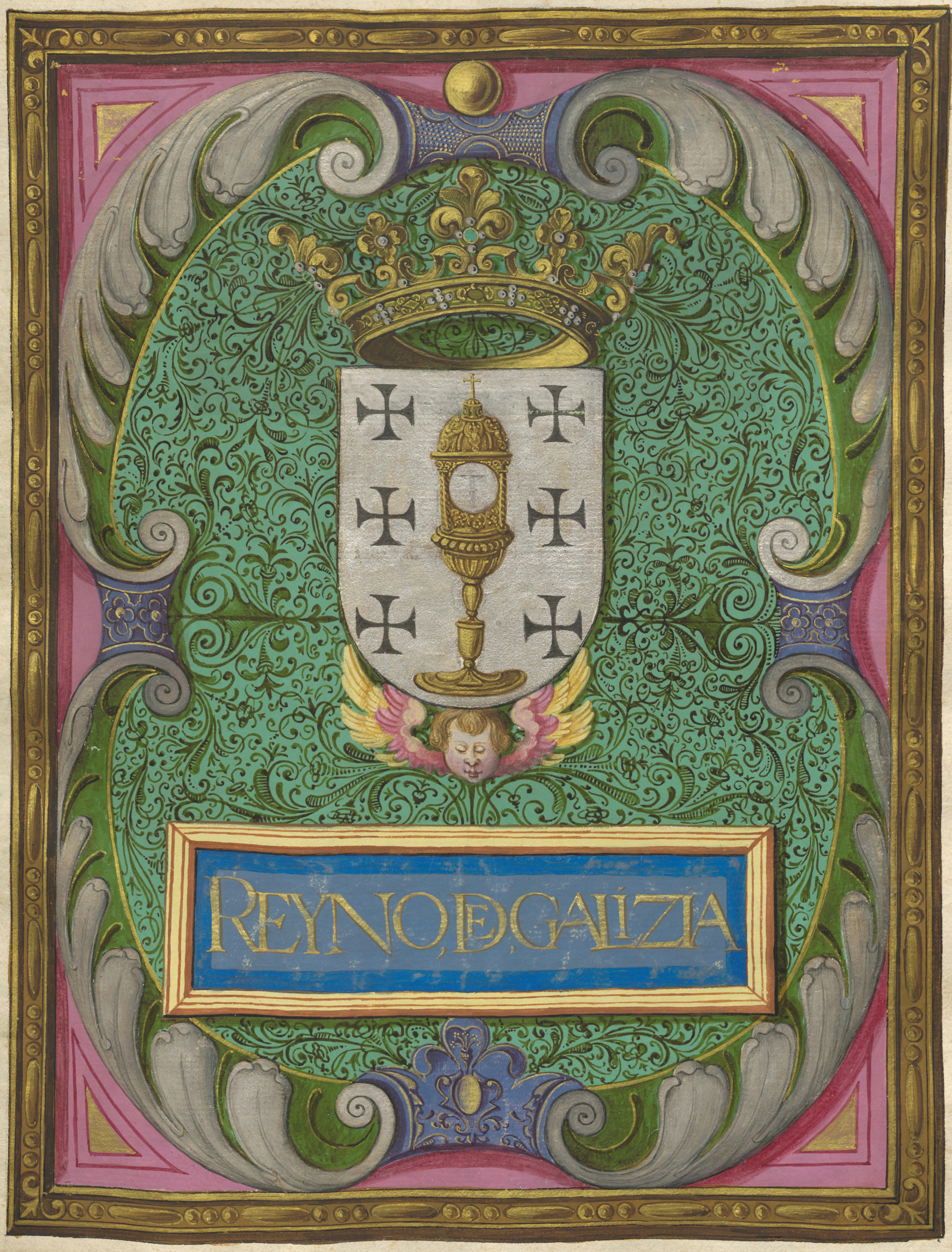
Coat of arms of the Kingdom of Galicia (c. 1625 AD).

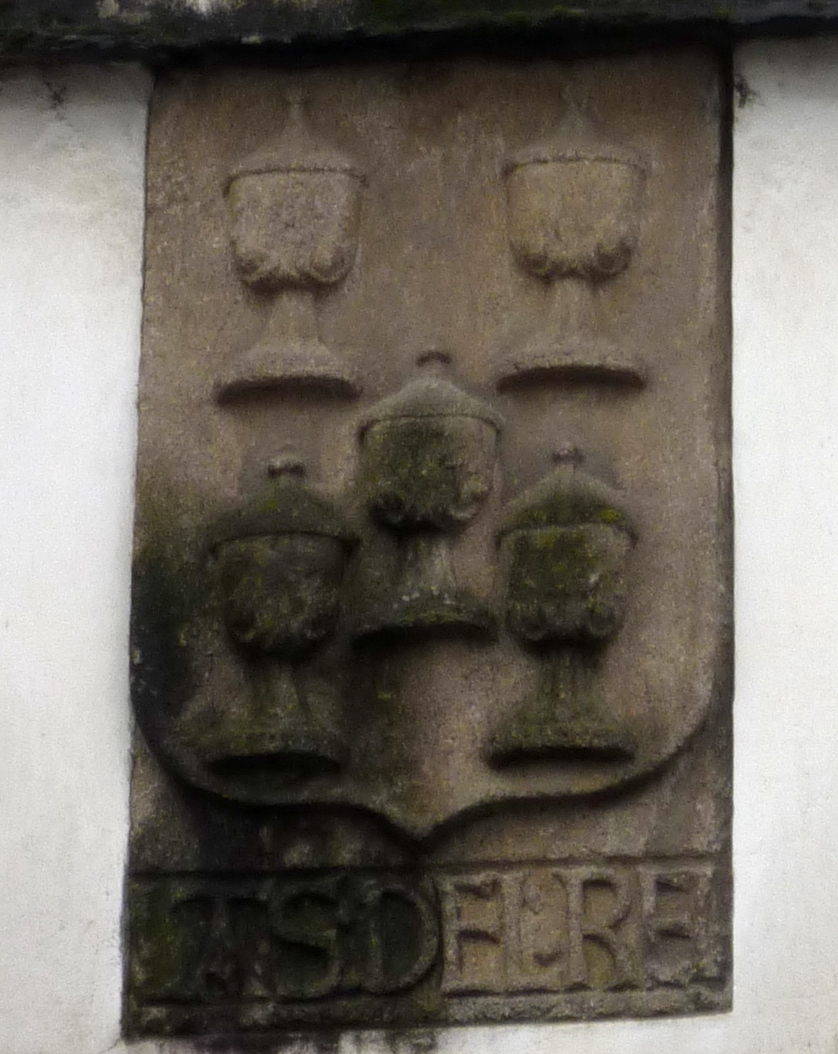
Coat of arms of the Kingdom of Galicia. Betanzos, 16th century.

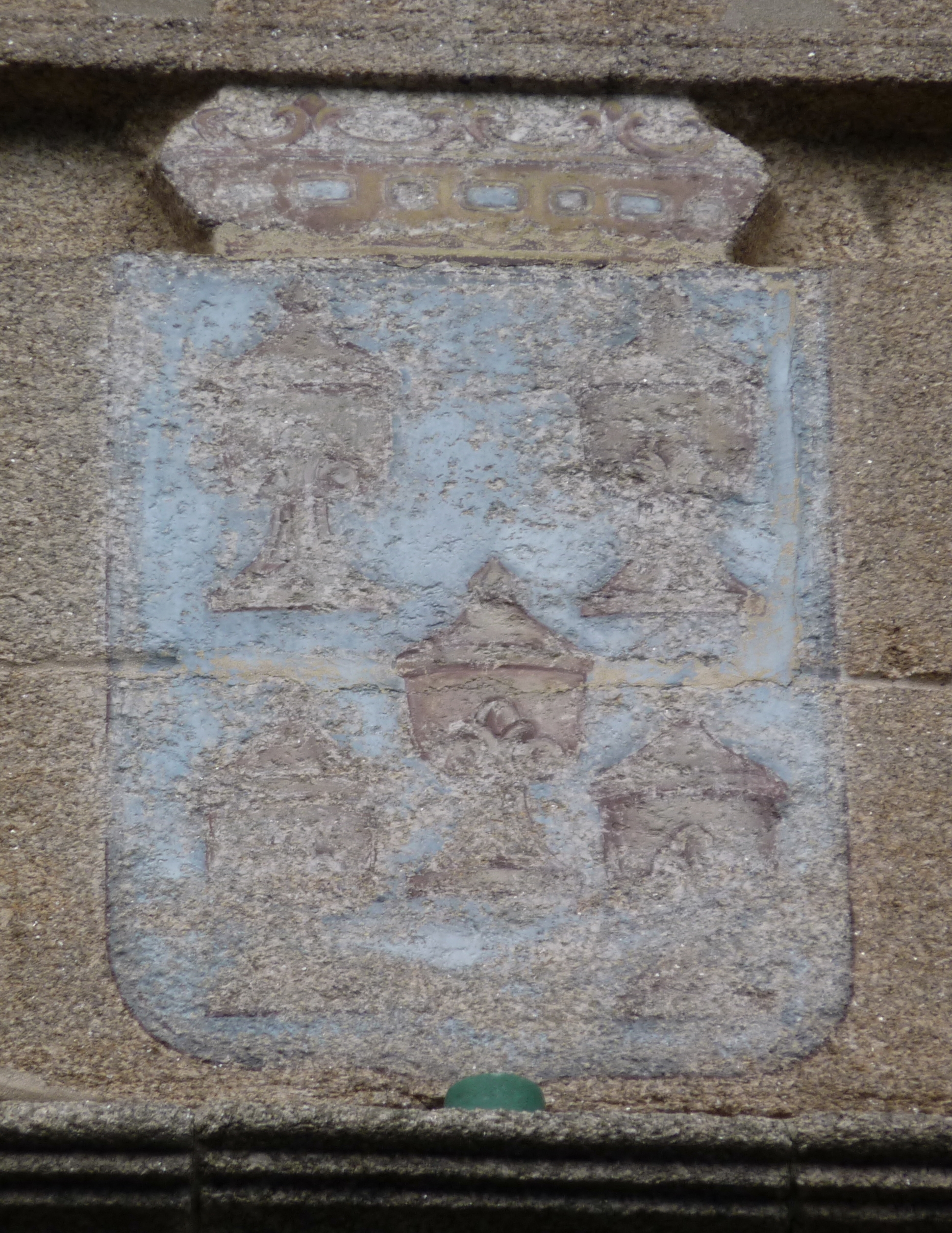
Coat of arms of the Kingdom of Galicia. Betanzos.

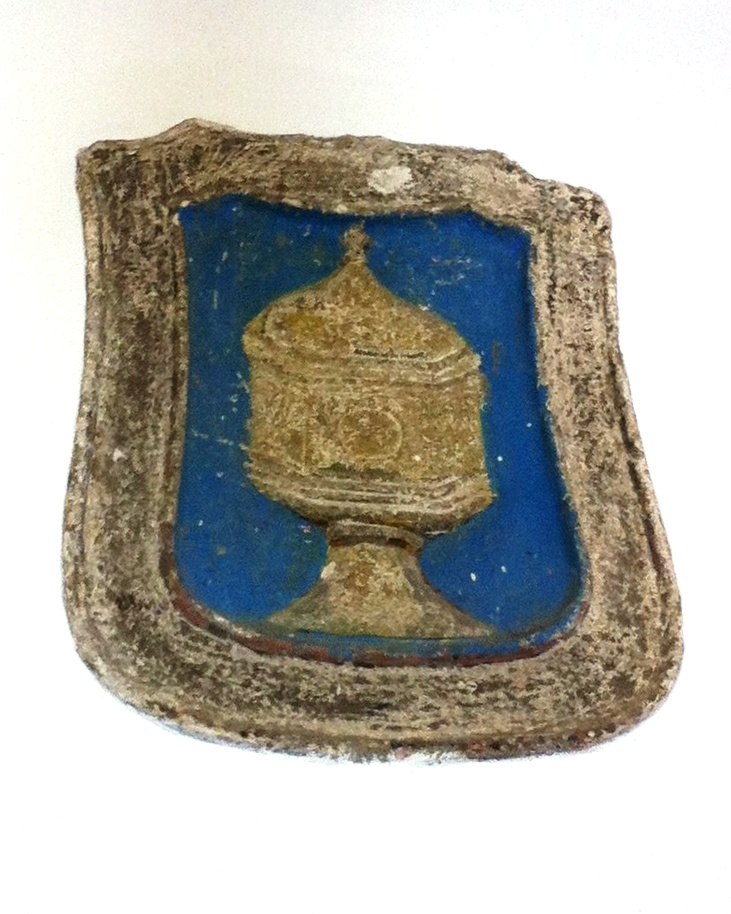
Coat of arms of the Kingdom of Galicia. Betanzos.

== Use ==
According to the text of the aforementioned Law of symbols, the coat of arms of Galicia shall be included:

- In the flags referred to in the fifth article of the law.
- In the laws of Galicia promulgated, in name of the King, by the President of the Xunta of Galicia.
- In the façade of the Autonomous Community administration buildings.
- In embossed and lacquer stamps of the Autonomous Community.
- In supporting documents of Galician decorations.
- In official publications.
- In documents, forms, stamps and letterheads in official use in the Autonomous Community.
- In diplomas and degree certificates.

== See also ==
- Flag of Galicia
- Coat of arms of Santiago de Compostela

== Bibliography ==
- F. MENÉNDEZ PIDAL, El origen inglés de las armas de Galicia, en Galicia en la Edad Media, Madrid, 1990.
- J. J. SÁNCHEZ BADIOLA, Desmontando España, Madrid, 2005.
