= Lidia Senra =

Spanish politician (born 1958)

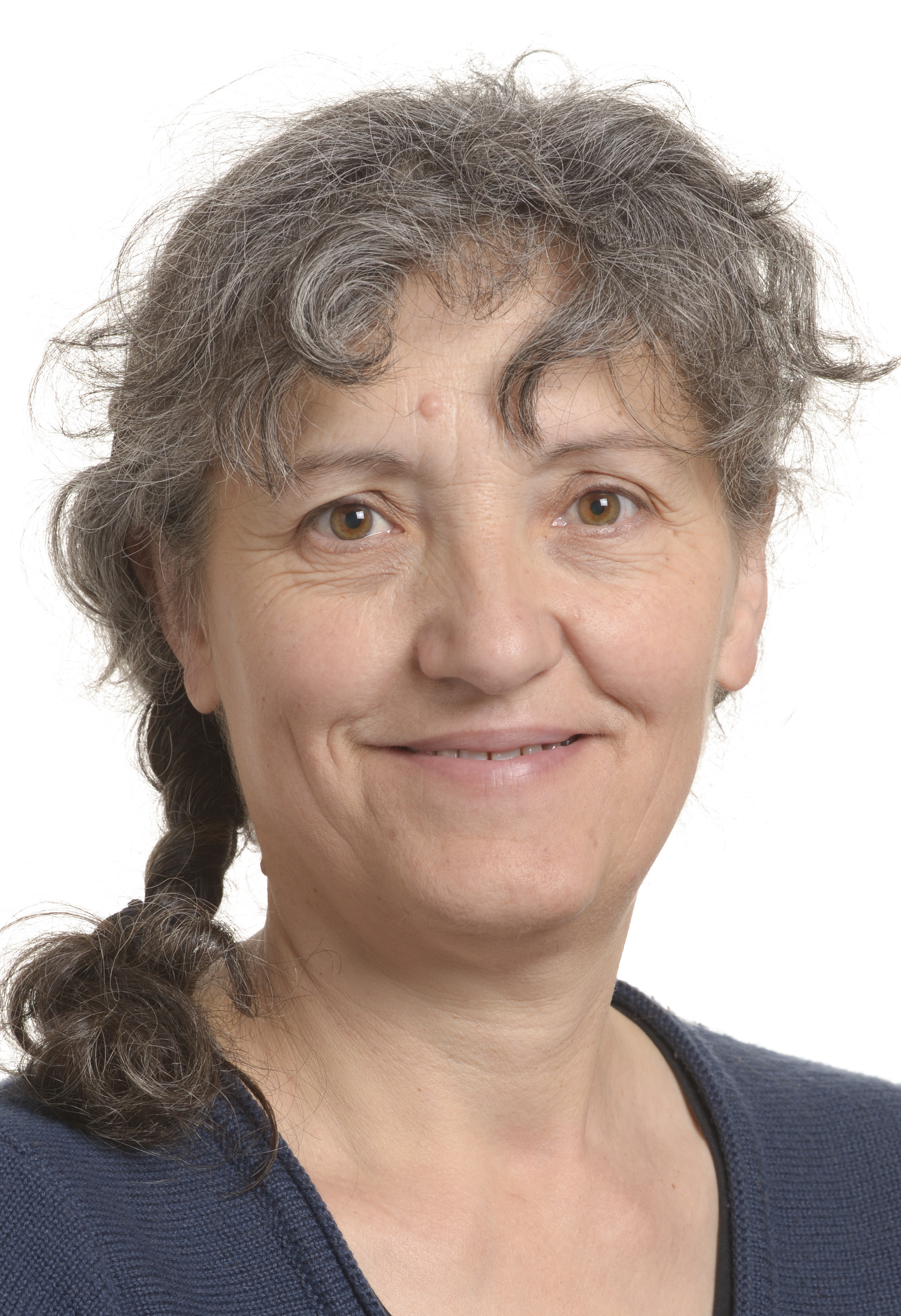

Member of the European Parliament
- In office 1 July 2014

Secretary General of the Sindicato Labrego Galego-Comisións Labregas
- In office 1984–2007

Personal details
- Born: Maria Lidia Senra Rodríguez; 14 June 1958 (age 67) A Pobra do Brollón, Spain
- Party: Anova–Nationalist Brotherhood
- Other political affiliations: Sindicato Labrego Galego-Comisións Labregas
- Occupation: Organic farmer, beekeeper, politician
- Website: ageuropa.gal

Maria Lidia Senra Rodríguez (born 14 June 1958) is an agrarian and political unionist from Galicia. She was secretary general of the Sindicato Labrego Galego (SLG) for 18 years and, since 2014, has been a Member of the European Parliament.

== Biography ==
Lidia Senra took Baccalaureate studies in Monforte de Lemos and then began to collaborate with the Committees of Axuda to Loita Labrega in the mid-1970s. In 1984, during the second congress of Comisións Labregas, she was elected to be responsible for organization and finance. Five years later, in the third congress, she acceded to the general secretariat of the Sindicato Labrego Galego (SLG). At that time, the Sindicato Labrego Galego-Comisións Labregas was in the orbit of the Galician People's Union (UPG), the Marxist–Leninist party that constituted the nucleus of the Galician Nationalist Bloc (in fact, it was the UPG that chose the union's secretaries general), and the SLG constituted the agrarian front of the BNG. Senra was re-elected three times. In 2007, she announced that she would not run for re-election. As secretary general of the SLG, she was a member of the executive of the Coordination Paysanne Européenne (transformed in 2008 into the European Coordination of Via Campesina, the world peasant movement that brings together organizations from the Americas, Asia, Africa, and Europe). In addition, she actively participated in the European Social Forums of Florence (2002), Paris (2003), and London (2004).

Despite her initial closeness to the UPG, she distanced herself from this organization. Thus, during the stage of the Galician bipartite (2005–2009), the union maintained a confrontation with the Xunta de Galicia's Ministry of Rural Affairs, in the hands of the UPG. Senra was integrated into the current Encontro Irmandiño in 2009, sponsored by Xosé Manuel Beiras. Senra left the Galego Nationalist Bloc in 2012, at the same time as the supporters of Beiras, who later formed the Anova–Nationalist Brotherhood.

After the internal vote in which Anova narrowly decided to stand for the 2014 European Parliament elections at the hands of the United Left (with which it formed the Galician Left Alternative in the Parliament of Galicia), Senra was proposed as its head of list in the candidacy of the Plural Left by the leader of Anova, Xosé Manuel Beiras, and endorsed mostly by the militants. Senra was in fifth place in the candidature, being one of the six elected MEPs. After the constitution of the chamber, she joined the Confederal Group of the European United Left–Nordic Green Left (GUE-NGL), and was part of the Committee on Agriculture and Rural Development. On 4 March 2017, Lidia Senra left the Confederal Group of the GUE-NGL.
