= Galician Youth Union =

Union of the Galician Youth Unión da Mocidade Galega
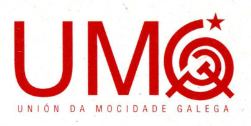
- Secretary General: Iago Suárez
- Founded: 1977
- Headquarters: Santiago de Compostela, Galicia
- Ideology: Galician nationalism Marxism–Leninism
- Mother party: Galician People's Union

The Galician Youth Union (UMG, Unión da Mocidade Galega in Galician language) is the youth wing of the Galician People's Union. It was created in August 1977.

== History ==
The document of the Galician People's Union (UPG) The youth of the party, in February 1977, included the decision to create the UMG due to the increase in the number of supporters, members and activists of the UPG in high school or that were young workers. University students were already members of the Galician Revolutionary Students (ERGA). This led the party to the creation of a youth organization which, besides serving to bring to the Galician youth "a patriotic and communist political line", could address the youth particular issues and problems effectively. The creation of UMG was ratified in the 1st Congress of UPG in August 1977, few days after the UMG itself was officially founded.

In the spring of 1977 a recruitment of militants was carried out, along with cell organization and theoretical and programmatic discussion. The constituent congress was held on the 14 and 15 August 1977, under the slogan "For a free and socialist Galiza". In that congress the UMG approved the statutes of the organization and a program that analyzed the specific situation of the Galician youth, the role of UMG that context and the alternatives that the organization should offer, including a table of "minimal demands". The UMG defined itself as the Patriotic and communist organization of Galiza and the youth wing of the Galician People's Union. In 1989 the UMG participated in the creation of Galiza Nova, the youth wing of the Galician Nationalist Bloc (BNG). Since then, UMG has subordinated its political action to Galiza Nova, rarely doing solo acts. Since 1988, after the creation of Galiza Nova (BNG youth organization), UMG renounced to make public activity, focusing all their efforts in working for the BNG.

== Ideology ==
Like the UPG, the UMG declares itself communist and nationalist, and believes that the establishment of socialism in Galiza necessarily passes by the previous national liberation of the country. Among Marxism the UMG follows the Marxist-Leninist ideology, although the organization also includes in their ideology the thought of the progressive Galician nationalists previous to the Spanish Civil War, like Castelao, Alexandre Bóveda or Ramón Suárez Picallo. The UMG also considers itself the continuation of the Federación de Mocedades Galeguistas.

== Organization ==
The first statutes of UMG, established democratic centralism as the main organizational principle. The organization is formed as a pyramidal organization, divided into zones and localities and defining cells as the basic fundamental core (called "Zone Assembly" since 1990). Local Committees and Area Committees are the intermediate direction bodies, while the Central Committee acts as the supreme body of the UMG between congresses and elected by (and in every) the National Congress. The executive committee is elected by the Central Committee. The highest governing body is the National Congress. Heading the UMG is the Secretary or general secretary, with executive functions.
