= Galiza Nova =

Young Galiza Galiza Nova
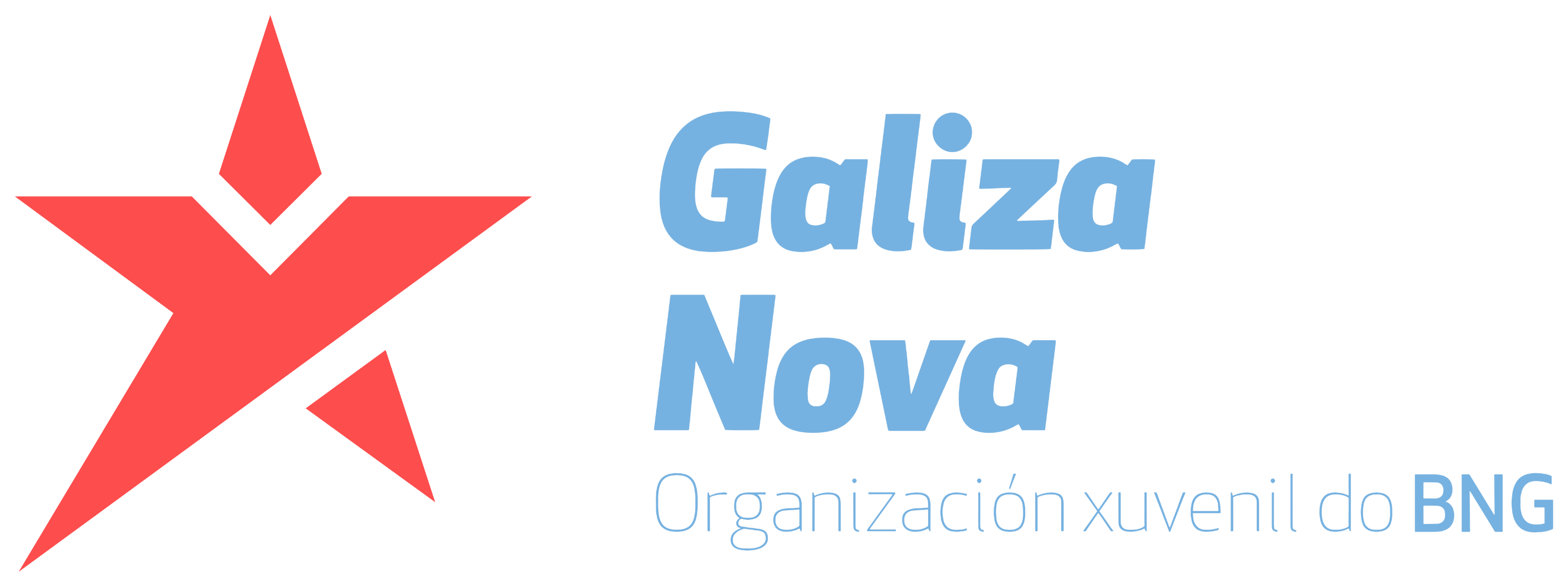
- Secretary General: Artai Gavilanes Villar
- Founded: 1988
- Headquarters: Santiago de Compostela, Galicia
- Ideology: Galician nationalism Galician independence Socialism; Feminism; Anti-imperialism; Euroscepticism
- Mother party: Galician Nationalist Bloc
- International affiliation: European Free Alliance Youth
- Website: galizanova.gal

Galiza Nova (Young Galiza) is the youth organisation of the Galician Nationalist Bloc, founded in 1988.

== History ==
Galiza Nova is the youth organisation of the Galician Nationalist Bloc (BNG) whose basic function is the organisation and mobilization of youth in order to achieve the national liberation of Galicia and the social transformation of the modern society. Its operation is based on assemblearism, with a decentralized structure divided in local and regional assemblies. The highest political body is the National Assembly that is held every two years, and where all the membership has the right to attend.

Although originally it was an independent organisation, it quickly began to work as the youth organisation of the Galician Nationalist Bloc, until the II Assembly (Compostela, 1990), absorbed ERGA and the Union of the Galician Youth, approved the admission into the BNG. They define their political objectives as the: "national liberation and the transformation of society (without national, class or gender oppression/exploitation and totally demilitarized)," claim a fully sovereign Galiza as the final culmination of the process of national self-determination. Galiza Nova also defends that the relationship between the different nations of the world should be based on equality and internationalist solidarity. Galiza Nova is also against the NATO and defends a Europe of the peoples as opposed to the current European Union of the states. Until its abolition in 2002, the organisation was a strong opponent of conscription and supported insubordination against it.

Galiza Nova was opposed to the ratification of the European Constitution, the Organic Law on Universities and the Organic Law of Education, the war in Iraq, holding a Council of Ministers in A Coruña (during the crisis caused by the sinking of the Prestige oil spill), the celebration of a military parade of the Spanish Armed Forces and the placing a large Spanish flag in the same city and recently showed his support for Hugo Chávez, Evo Morales and Fidel Castro with the slogan "Only the peoples that struggle win. Galiza with the revolution." Galiza Nova had an internal crisis between 2009 and 2012 due to the political differences between Isca!, the Galician Nationalist Youth and the Union of the Galician Youth which ended with the victory of the Union of the Galician Youth, the departures of Isca! and the Galician Nationalist Youth from the organisation and the split of the Galician Student League and the Movemento Estudantil Universitario from the Comités.

In 2013 and 2014 Galiza Nova organised, along with other youth organisations and 3 student unions, demonstrations for the independence of Galicia the eve of the Día Nacional de Galicia.

== Festigal ==
The Festigal is festival organised by Galiza Nova every 24 and 25 of July. It has concerts, sporting activities, talks and debates. It's one of the most important festivals of Galicia, with a record attendance of 100,000 people.

== Secretary General ==
- Catuxo Álvarez (1988–1990)
- Manuel Antelo (1990–1992)
- Bieito Lobeira (1992–1996)
- Martiño Santos (1996–2000)
- Rubén Cela (2000–2004)
- Xosé Emilio Vicente (2004–2007)
- Iria Aboi (2007–2012)
- Alberte Mera García (2012–2016)
- Alberte Fernández Silva (2016–2019)
- Paulo Ríos Santomé (2019–2021)
- Marta Gómez Martín (2021–2025)
- Artai Gavilanes Villar (2025-)
