= Isca! =

Galician youth organization

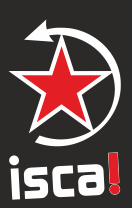
- Founded: 2006
- Headquarters: Santiago de Compostela, Galicia
- Ideology: Galician independence Socialism; Feminism; Anti-imperialism
- Mother party: Galician Nationalist Bloc; Galician Movement for Socialism
- Website: iscagz.org

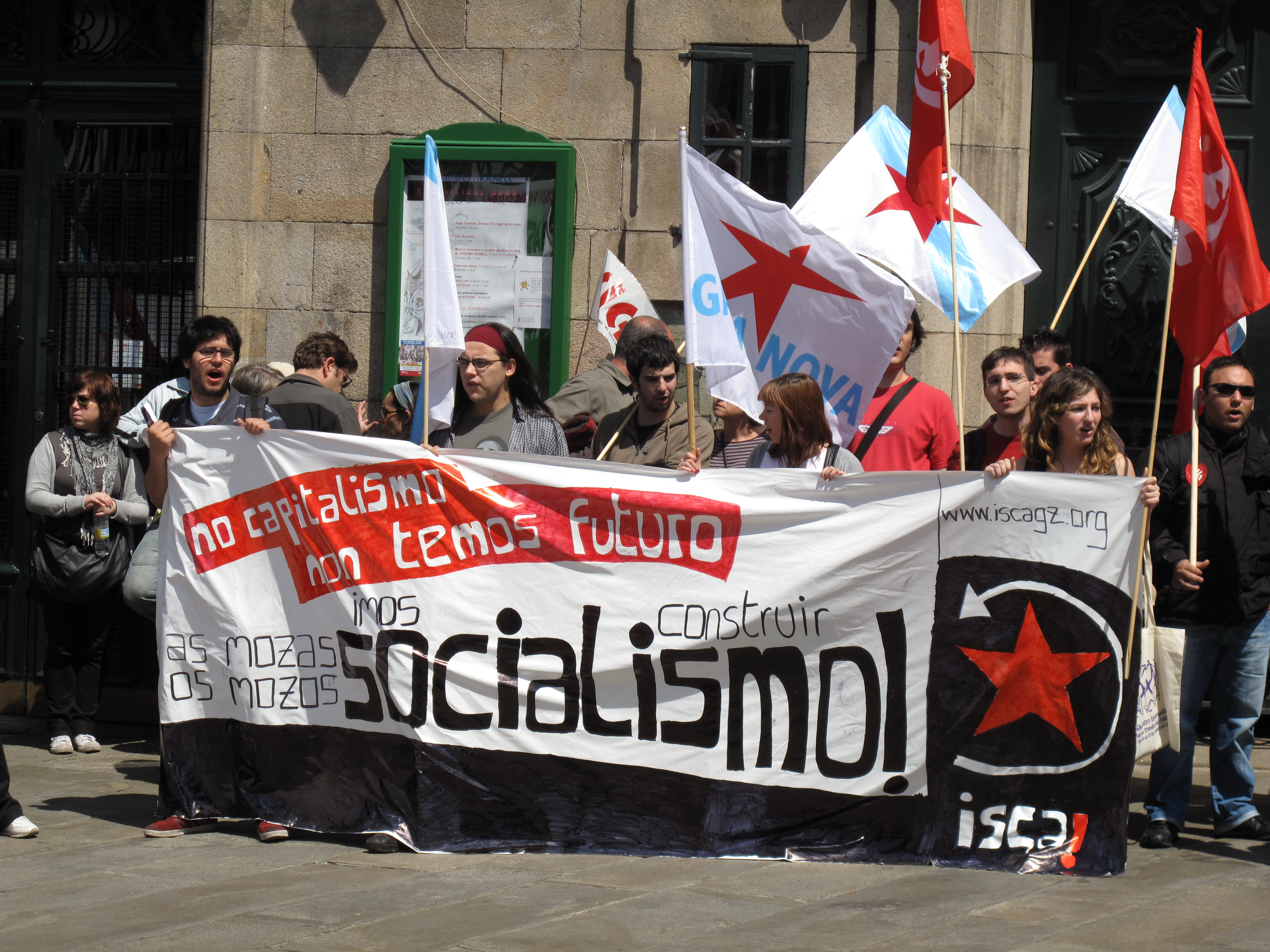
Isca! in a demonstration in 2009.

Isca! is the name of a Galician youth organization that promotes Galician independence, combined with anti-capitalist and feminist ideology. They are linked to the Galician Movement for Socialism, a socialist and pro-independence party that forms part of the Galician Nationalist Bloc (BNG).

== History ==
Established on July 16, 2006 in Santiago de Compostela, in Isca! was created by a militant splinter group of the youth of the UPG in January of that year, together with other leftist critics in Galiza Nova, the youth organization of Galician Nationalist Bloc. The first public appearance of Isca! was on July 25, 2006, in the acts of the National Day of Galicia, at the demonstration called by the BNG.

Isca! participated in its beginnings within Galiza Nova as an internal current, but left the organization due to the ideological differences and the tension with the UPG youth wing, the UMG. The split in Galiza Nova was followed by the rupture in the student union, the Comités. Isca! members left Comités in 2011. They, along other 150 ex-members of the Comités formed the Galician Student League (LEG), that achieved a huge success in the 2012 University of Santiago de Compostela elections, where the LEG was the most voted student organization and gained 20 student representatives.

Among its prominent members is Xosé Emilio Vicente Caneda, who at the time of the creation of the organization was the secretary general of Galiza Nova.

== Objectives ==
Its aim is "to bring together different sectors of the Galician youth that are particularly critical of the drift towards the institutional policy" electoralism and political marketing that, according to Isca!, other nationalist groups, such as the UPG have carried out in the recent years. They understand that there is a framework of class struggle in Galicia, which denies the possibility of an interclassistic policy. They deny what they call the "pessimistic views on the Galician society" are committed to the horizontal relationship between BNG and social movements and postulate the right to self-determination as "irrevocable of the Galician people."

== Social movements ==
Isca! gives a key importance to the social movements and the street protests. In addition to the work within the BNG, the militancy of Isca! participates in social collectives such as the Confederación Intersindical Galega or the Galician Student League. They also participate in the feminist, the environmental and cultural associations and in the left-wing "independentist" social centres.
