= Central Unitaria de Traballadores =

Spanish labor union

CUT
- Workers Unitary Central
- Central Unitaria de Traballadores
- Founded: 1998
- Headquarters: Vigo, Galiza
- Location: Spain
- Key people: Ricardo Castro, general secretary
- Affiliations: WFTU
- Website: cutgaliza.org

The Central Unitaria de Traballadores (CUT, Workers Unitary Central or Workers Unitary Confederation in English language) is a Galician union created in December 1998 after a split with the Confederación Intersindical Galega. The CUT has very close ties with the Galician People's Front.

The founding congress was held in Vigo on 19 April 1999. The CUT defines itself as a class union, which aims to defend the interests of the working class. The organization also defends active and combative unionism, as opposed to the mild tactics of the main unions, especially Workers Commissions and the Unión General de Trabajadores. It has a Galician nationalist and socialist ideology. The CUT has offices in Santiago de Compostela, A Coruña, Vigo, Cangas do Morrazo and Ribeira. In 2009, 600 members of the CUT split (including the majority of the militants of A Coruña and Ferrolterra) and formed the Central Obreira Galega (Galician Workers Central).
