= Galician Nationalist Youth =

Galician Nationalist Youth Mocidade Nacionalista Galega
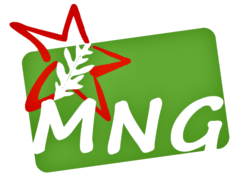
- Founded: 2010
- Headquarters: Santiago de Compostela, Galicia
- Ideology: Galician nationalism Social democracy Europeanism; Republicanism
- Mother party: Compromiso por Galicia
- Website: mocidadenacionalistagalega.org

Galician Nationalist Youth (MNG, Mocidade Nacionalista Galega, in Galician language), is the youth-wing of Compromiso por Galicia in Galicia (Spain). It was founded in November 2010 in the city of Santiago de Compostela as the youth-wing of Máis Galiza, and integrated within Galiza Nova and the Galician Nationalist Bloc until 10 March 2012, when the MNG broke with both organizations.

MNG defends the right of Galiza to define and decide its future freely and sovereignly, in order to achieve self-determination.

Galician Nationalist Youth is a direct political heir of the Galician Socialist Youth.
