= Galician Student League =

Youth organization

Galician Student League Liga Estudantil Galega
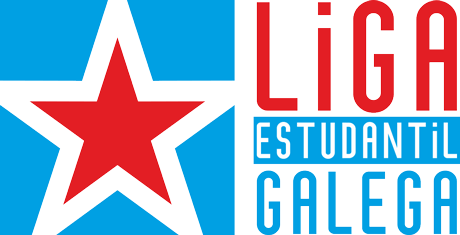
- Founded: 2011
- Dissolved: 2016
- Headquarters: Santiago de Compostela, Galicia
- Ideology: Galician nationalism Socialism; Feminism; Galician independence
- Website: ligaestudantilgalega.info

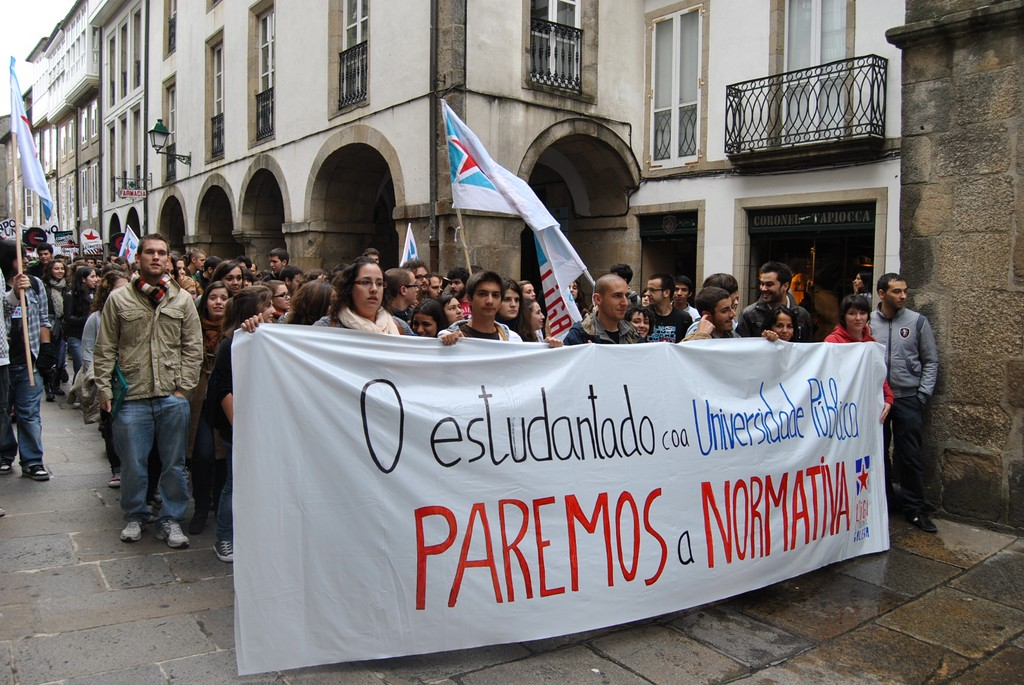
Demonstration against the new (2012) normatives in the University of Santiago de Compostela.

The Galician Student League (LEG, Liga Estudantil Galega in Galician language) was a student union that advocated for a public education, in galician language, democratic, of quality and not patriarchal. It was an open organization, which was governed by internal democracy and horizontal assemblies. In the LEG could participate any high school, vocational training or university student.

== History ==
The LEG was born on March 26, 2011, at the Faculty of Law of Santiago de Compostela, after a rupture of more than 150 militants of the Comités with this organization. The splitters accused the Comités of antidemocratic practices and of being totally controlled by the Galician People's Union. Among the splitters were the militants of youth organizations like Isca!. In April 2012 the first National Assembly of the organization takes place in Lugo. The same year, in May, the League was the most voted student organization in the University of Santiago de Compostela elections, gaining 20 of the 75 student seats in the University Council. In the 2013 elections in the University of A Coruña the LEG won 3 of the 60 student seats. In 2014 the League was again the most voted student organization in the University of Santiago de Compostela elections, gaining 24 of the 75 student seats in the University Council.

Since its foundation the LEG has called for several student strikes, including 5 along with the other galician nationalist unions, AGIR and Comités.

In 2016 the organization joined Erguer - Estudantes da Galiza.

== Ideology ==
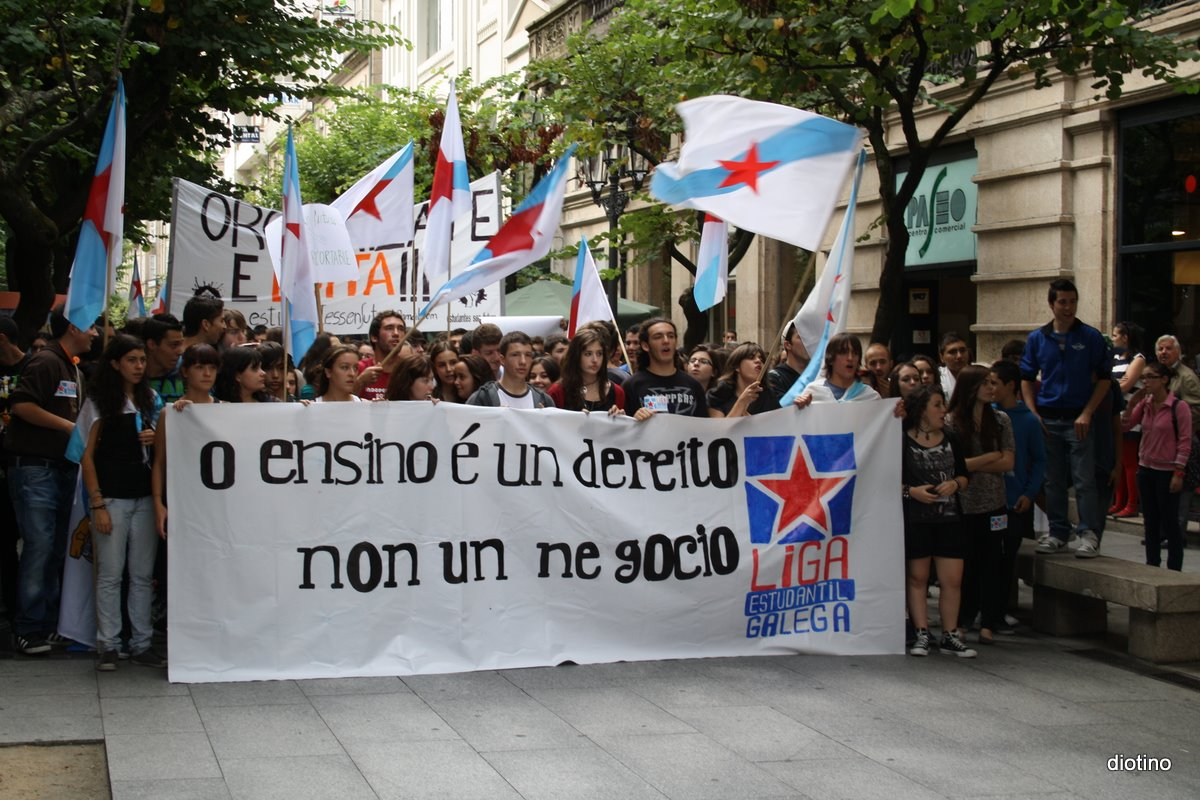
Demonstration against cuts in Pontevedra.

The Galician Student League has clear ideological position and rejects apoliticism. The organization openly defines itself as socialist, "independentist" and feminist and participates in acts of non-student character, as nationalist, language, labor and feminist protests.
