= Comités =

- Founded: 2008
- Headquarters: Santiago de Compostela, Galicia
- Ideology: Galician nationalism Feminism; Socialism; Galician independence
- Mother party: Galician Nationalist Bloc
- Website: comitesabertos.org

Comités (Committees in English language) is a student organization of Galiza. Formed from the union of the CAF-CAF (Comités Abertos de Facultade, Open College Committees in English) and the CAE (Comités Abertos de Estudantes, Open Student Committees in English). Comités defends public, democratic and quality education in galician language. It is an assembly-based organization. The Comités are considered the heirs of the CAF, CAE and of the ERGA.

== History ==
Due to the internal problems of the CAF and the CAE, those two organizations opted for its self-dissolution and boosted the creation of a new galician student union. That organization would be Comités, that had its constituent assembly in May 2008.

In 2011 a group of more than 150 militants abandoned Comités, and accused the direction of undemocratic practices and of being subordinated to the Galician People's Union strategy. The splitters would create the same year the Galician Student League.
