= Galician nationalism =

Form of nationalism found mostly in Galicia

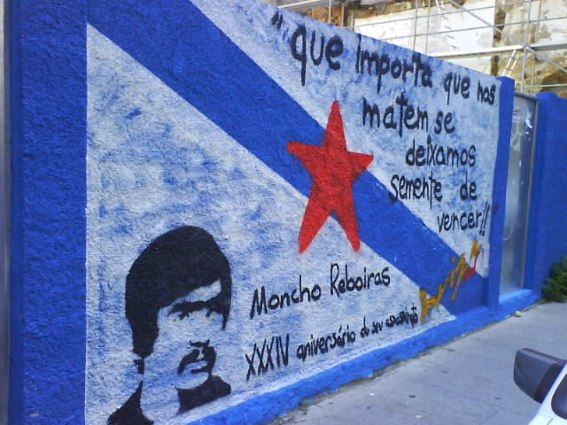
Mural in honor of Xosé Ramón Reboiras in Ferrol, shot dead by the police in 1975. The Galician estreleira flag is visible.

Galician nationalism (Galician: nacionalismo galego) is a political and social movement in Galicia that advocates for the cultural unity and recognition of Galicia as a distinct nation and asserts the right of the Galician people to self-determination. The movement asserts that Galicia possesses a unique identity, rooted in its own historical development, language, and culture, which stands in contrast to the centralism of the Spanish state.

Modern Galician nationalism originated in the early 20th century, evolving from the broader movement known as Galicianism (Galician: galeguismo). It consolidated as an organized political force with the founding of the Irmandades da Fala in 1916. Throughout the 20th century, the movement has encompassed a spectrum of ideologies, ranging from moderate autonomism to calls for full sovereignty, notably represented by figures such as Vicente Risco and Castelao, and organizations like the Partido Galeguista.

== History ==
=== Origins ===
The concept of Galicianism first appeared in the mid-nineteenth century. At that time in history it was initially known as "provincialism". Soon it was referred to as regionalism. This was a reaction to the increased centralization of the Spanish State (following the French model of nation-state) which attempted to eradicate internal administrative, and to some point cultural, differences within the country.

The term Galicianism as such was coined after the establishment of the Irmandades da Fala (Brotherhoods of the Galician Language), in 1916, and the apparition of modern Galician nationalism. The Irmandades da Fala was an organization hosting members from both the lower-middle-class and intellectuals. This organization was led by Antón Vilar Ponte. Within the next decade (1920s), this organization was strengthened by two groups: the nationalists, led by the Partido Galeguista (Galicianist Party) of Castelao, and the federalist republicans of ORGA. ORGA was directed by Santiago Casares and Antón Vilar.

=== Republic and civil war ===
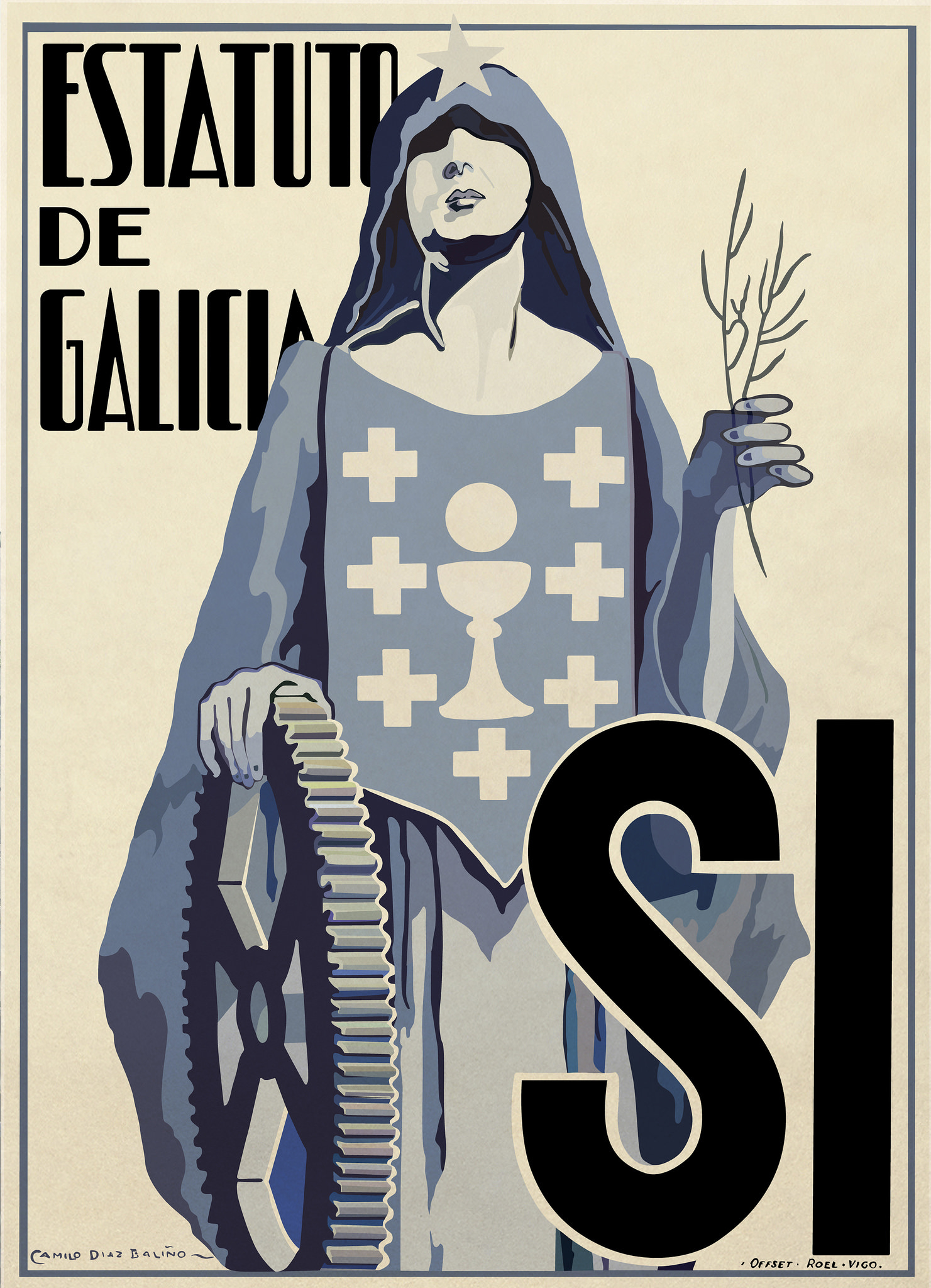
Pro-Galician autonomy poster by Díaz Baliño (1936)

In 1931, with the coming of the Spanish Second Republic, a number of drafts for a Statute of Autonomy were prepared by the Galicianists. The final version was approved in December 1932 at the Municipal Assembly of the Galician capital, Santiago de Compostela. The Statute of Autonomy was approved by referendum on 28 June 1936, and later ratified by the Spanish Parliament in 1937. However, the Spanish Civil War and the subsequent dictatorship put an end to the prospect of autonomy. At the end of the war (1939) many Galicianists were either executed or had to leave for exile.

=== The Francoist period ===
The Galician statute of autonomy of 1936 (pdf).

The foundation of the Editorial Galaxia in 1950, publishing house promoting Galician culture and Galician language, was a visible act of resistance. Clandestine organizations supporting the cause of Marxism (as an opposition to the dictator) flourished in the 1950s and 1960s following the example of Editorial Galaxia and taking advantage of a timid relaxation of the dictatorial regime. Those new organizations and movements openly labelled themselves as nationalist, seeing themselves as the natural heirs of the early Galicianists (for example the Galician People's Union (UPG) was founded by some old Galicianists among other new members). All those organizations would claim Alfonso Daniel Rodríguez Castelao's classic work, Sempre en Galiza (1944), as the ideological cornerstone for Galician contemporary nationalism and even for their own foundational principles.

=== Contemporary Period ===
With the end of the dictatorship in 1975 and the passing of a new constitution in 1978, Galicianism was further strengthened up to the point that today the vast majority of political forces in Galicia call themselves Galicianist, whether they are nationalist or not, left wing or right wing.

For example, unlike in other Spanish autonomous communities, the conservative People's Party of Galicia includes Galicianism (seen as strong regionalism) as one of its ideological principles. Even the Spanish Socialist Workers' Party has a strong regional flavour in Galicia, not to mention the actual main Galician nationalist party, the Galician Nationalist Bloc (BNG). A possible explanation for this is that Galician identity is so embedded in Galicians that any political party willing to participate in elections must at least show some degree of interest in the promotion of Galicianism, but it may range greatly, from moderate regionalism to outright claims for independence.

== Ideology ==
The Estreleira flag, also called Bandeira da Pátria.

Historians, geographers and ethnologists recognize the existence of a Galician ethnic group, forming a singular unit in a specific territory. However, this is a wide conceptualization that in political terms allows many possible variants. Inside Galician nationalism two main ideological currents can be found:

- Autonomist: claims for an extended autonomy of Galicia, further devolution and (in occasions) the transformation of Spain into a federal state where Galicia would eventually achieve self-determination.
- Pro-independence: campaigns for immediate and total independence from Spain.

Both autonomists and independentists have points in common, such as the defence and promotion of Galician culture and language, with some supporting reintegrationism. Both also argue for the official and unequivocal recognition of Galicia as a nation and the defense of Galician speakers outside administrative Galician territory, in Galician-speaking areas of the Spanish regions of Asturias and Castile and León (Galicia irredenta).

It is often considered that the ideological framework of contemporary Galician nationalism was set in Alfonso Daniel Rodríguez Castelao's key work Sempre em Galiza (lit. "Always in Galicia"), published in 1944.

== Political nationalism in society ==
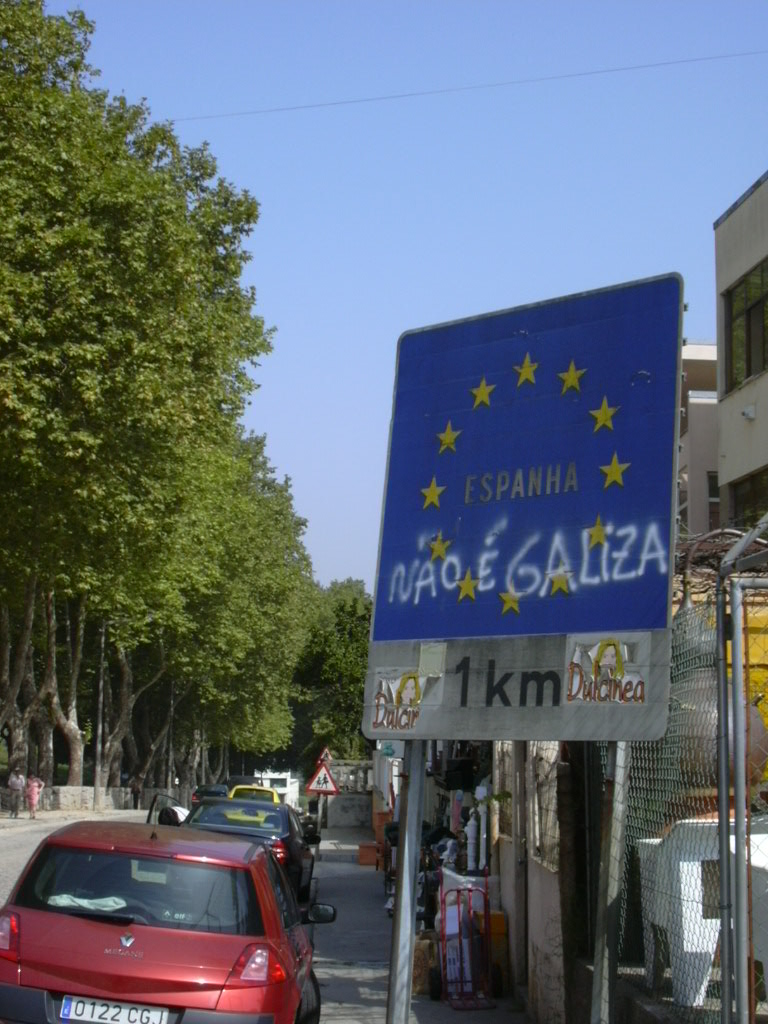
Galician nationalist graffiti on a roadsign marking the Portugal–Spain border, translated as "Spain is not Galicia"

Galician nationalist candidates received 19% of the vote in the elections of 2005 and 16% in 2009.

From 2005 to 2009 Galicia was ruled by a coalition government between the Socialists' Party of Galicia (PSdeG-PSOE) and the Galician Nationalist Bloc (BNG). Unlike in other Spanish autonomous communities the conservative and pro-Spanish People's Party of Galicia (PPdeG) includes Galicianism as one of its ideological principles. Even the Spanish Socialist Party has a quite strong regional flavour in Galicia. This issue somehow explains electoral behaviour in Galicia and why nationalist parties have a reduced representation when compared to Catalonia and the Basque Country, as voters in Galicia may choose to go for Spanish parties promoting Galicianism depending on the circumstances. Spanish parties in Catalonia and the Basque Country do not have such a strong regional identity, but the Socialist Party in Catalonia has recently incorporated nationalist elements in its political discourse.

A possible explanation for this political behaviour in pro-Spanish parties is that Galician identity is so embedded in Galicians that any political party willing to participate in elections must at least show some degree of interest in the promotion of Galicianism, but how it is done may vary greatly.

The Galician Nationalist Bloc is itself a coalition of parties, which endorse independence, but not all individual members and parallel organizations within it support that idea. At present, BNG claims for sovereignty and independence, both political and economic. Other nationalist parties stand for outright independence, and until recently they only had representatives in local councils and not in the Galician Parliament. In the 2012 election the newly formed Galician Left Alternative, which includes pro-independence groups, overtook the BNG in Parliament, winning 9 seats.

The present Galician Statute of Autonomy (1981) defines Galicia as a nationality. The Galician Government is currently drafting a new Statute of Autonomy where Galicia will most probably be defined as a nation (with declaratory but not legal value).

According to a survey conducted by the CIS in 2020, 80.2% of Galicians are in favor of remaining part of the Spanish state, and 65.2% identify as both Galician and Spanish.

== Nationalist political parties and nationalist organizations ==
- Galician Nationalist Bloc (BNG) - (coalition of parties ranging from social democracy to socialism and communism; pro-independence).
  - Galician People's Union (UPG) - (Communist; pro-independence).
  - Galician Movement for Socialism (Socialist; pro-independence).
  - Abrente–Galician Democratic Left (Social democratic; federalist).
  - Galiza Nova - Young Galiza, the main youth organization of the BNG (Socialist; Feminist; pro-independence).
    - Galician Youth Union - Youth organization of the Galician People's Union (Communist; pro-independence).
  - Isca! - Youth organization of the Galician Movement for Socialism (Socialist; Feminism; pro-independence).
- Renewal–Nationalist Brotherhood (Socialism; pro-independence).
  - Galician People's Front (FPG) - (Leninism; pro-independence).
  - Encontro Irmandiño (EI) - "Irmandiño Gathering" (Direct democracy; Alter-globalization; Anti-capitalism; pro-independence.
  - Xeira - Youth organization of the Galician People's Front (Leninism; pro-independence).
- Cerna - (direct democracy; Anti-capitalism; pro-independence).
- Commitment to Galicia - (Social democratic; federalist).
  - Máis Galiza "More Galicia" (Social democratic; federalist).
  - Acción Galega, "Galician Action" (Social liberalism; federalist).
  - Galician Nationalist Party–Galicianist Party (PNG-PG) - (Centre to Centre-left; federalist).
  - Galician Nationalist Youth - Youth organization of CxG
- Galician Left Alternative (AGE) - (Coalition of leftist parties created for the 2012 election, including ANOVA, Esquerda Unida-Izquierda Unida and EQUO, the former pro-independence and the latter federalist).
- Land Party - (Transversal; Green politics).
- Converxencia XXI (CXXI) - "Convergence XXI" (Liberal centre; European federalist, although not self-proclaimed nationalists).
- Terra Galega (TeGa) - "Galician Land" (Centre to Centre-right; federalist).
- Galician Coalition (CG) - (Centre to Centre-right; federalist).
- Partido Galeguista Demócrata (PGD) - "Galicianist Democratic Party" (Centre-right to Centre-left; federalist).
- Galician Workers' Front - (Socialism; pro-independence).
- Nós–Unidade Popular (Nós-UP) - "Us-People United" (Socialist; Reintegrationist).
  - Primeira Linha - "Front Line" (Communist; pro-independence), associated with Nós-UP.
  - BRIGA - "Fight" or "Struggle", Youth organization of Nós-UP (Communist; pro-independence; feminist)
  - AGIR - "REACT", Student organization of Nós-Unidade Popular (Communist; pro-independence).
- Causa Galiza - "Cause Galiza" (Socialism; pro-independence).
- Galician Convergence - (Centre to Centre-right; federalist),
- Assembly of the Independentist Youth (AMI) - (Libertarian socialist, pro-independence, feminist).
- Espazo Ecosocialista Galego - Galician Ecosocialist Space (Ecosocialist, federalism).
- Confederación Intersindical Galega - Galician Union Confederacy, main union in Galicia, specially close to the BNG (Anti-capitalism; pro-independence).
- Central Unitaria de Traballadores - "Workers' Unitary Central", union close to the Galician People's Front (Anti-capitalism; pro-independence).
- Sindicato Labrego Galego-Comisións Labregas - Agrarian union. Independent, but close to Renewal–Nationalist Brotherhood.
- FRUGA - Agrarian union close to the BNG.
- Galician Student League - Student union. Independent, but close to the Galician Movement for Socialism (Anti-capitalism; feminism; pro-independence).
- Comités - Student union. Close to Galiza Nova.
- Resistência Galega - Armed organization. Its actual existence is disputed.

== See also ==
- Galicianism
- Galicia (Spain)
- Galician language
- Galician people
- Galicia irredenta
- Galicia–North Portugal Euroregion
- Galicia independence
- Nationalities in Spain
- Pan-Celticism
