= Parliament of the Canary Islands =

Regional legislature of the Canary Islands

Coordinates: 28°28′03″N 16°15′06″W

Parliament of the Canary Islands Parlamento de Canarias

Type
- Type: Spanish regional legislature
- Houses: Unicameral

Leadership
- President: Astrid Pérez, PP since 27 June 2023
- First Vice President: Ana Oramas, CCa since 27 June 2023
- Second Vice President: Gustavo Matos, PSC-PSOE since 27 June 2023
- First Secretary: Mario Cabrera, CCa since 27 June 2023
- Second Secretary: Patricia Hernández, PSC-PSOE since 27 June 2023

Structure
- Seats: 70
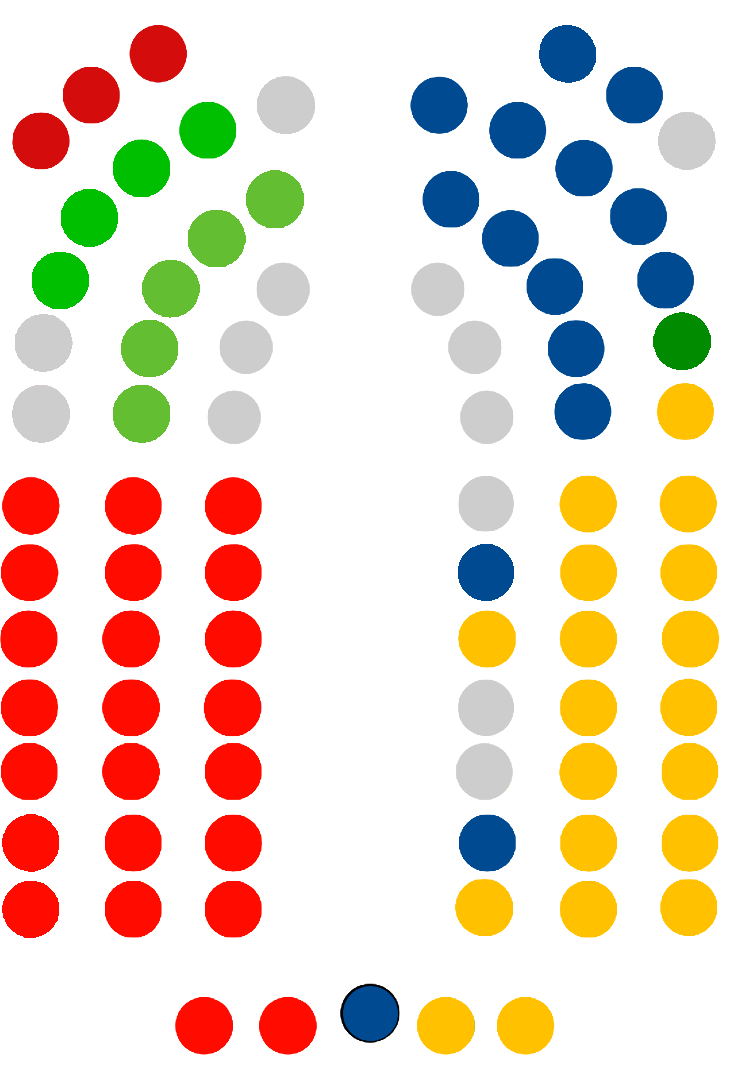
- Political groups: Government (38): CCa (19); PP (15); ASG (3); AHI (1); Opposition (32): PSC-PSOE (23); NC–BC (5); Vox (4)

Elections
- Last election: 28 May 2023

Meeting place
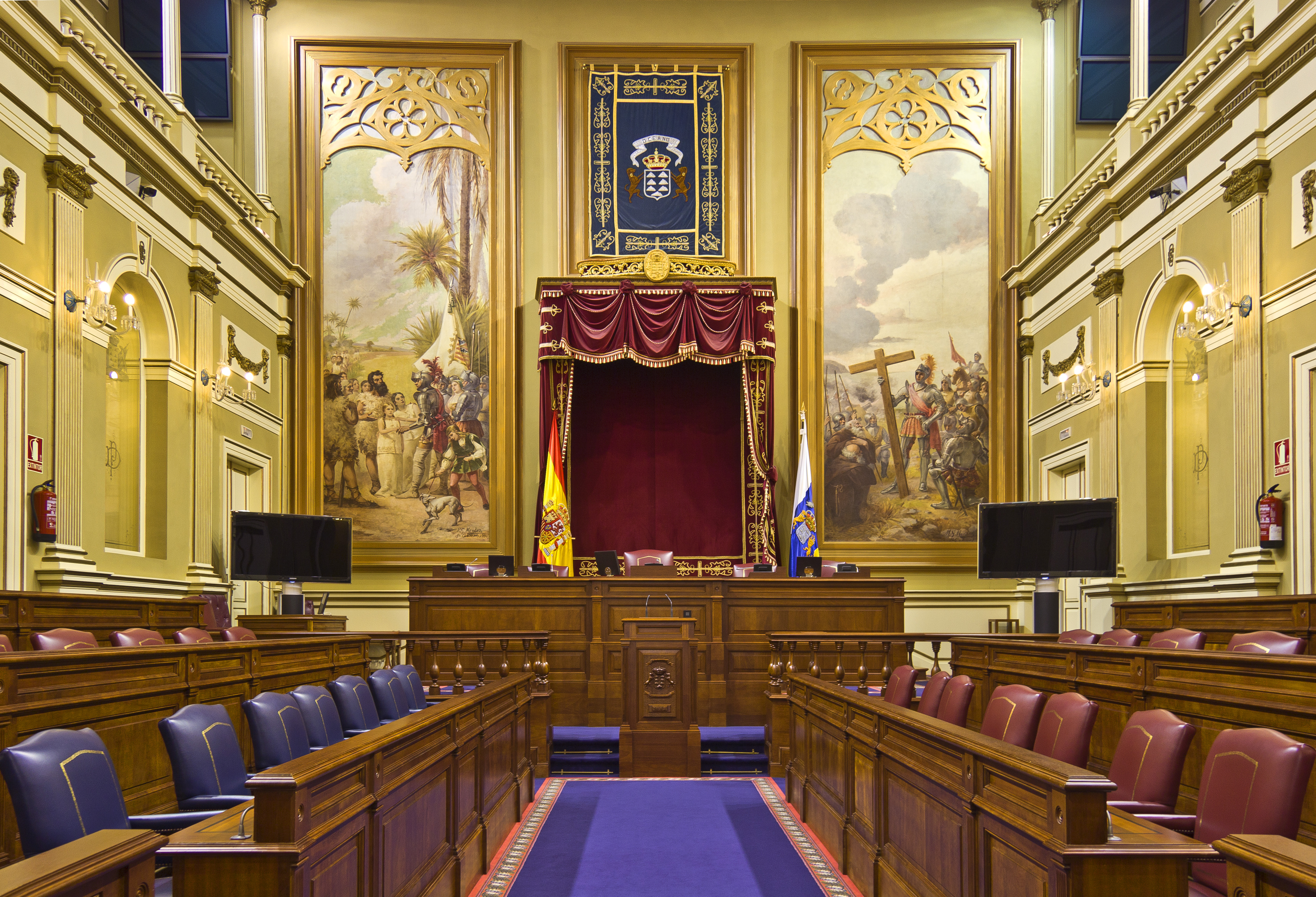
- Parliamentary Chamber, Santa Cruz de Tenerife

Website
- www.parcan.es

The Parliament of the Canary Islands (Spanish: Parlamento de Canarias) is the regional legislature of the Canary Islands, an autonomous community of Spain. The Parliament has seventy members elected on four-year terms. The parliament approves the Canary Islands budget and controls the actions of the Canary Islands Government. The parliament is based in Santa Cruz de Tenerife, one of the Canaries' two capitals.

== History ==
During the Second Spanish Republic, as in the case with other regions of Spain, the Constitution of 1931 established an autonomous community in the Canary Islands presented with its own Statute. During this time, two projects were realized: the Provincial Inter-Island Association in Santa Cruz de Tenerife and the College of Commercial Agents in Las Palmas. The unification of two provincial associations, with the creation of a Canarian Parliament was planned. However, the outbreak of the Spanish Civil War and the subsequent course of the new government made its implementation impossible.

The Parliament of the Canary Islands was officially established following the approval of the Statute of Autonomy of the Canary Islands on 10 August 1982, although since the adoption of 1978 Spanish Constitution, a legislative institution had already existed and fulfilled its function. The parliament held its first session in its current meeting place on 30 May 1983, under the presidency of Pedro Guerra Cabrera. In commemoration, 30 May is celebrated annually as Canary Islands Day.

== Statutory position ==
=== Statutory powers ===
According to Articles 12 and 13 of the Statute of Autonomy of the Canary Islands, the functions of the Parliament of the Canary Islands are as follows:

1. To elect a Bureau consisting of a President, two Vice-Presidents, and two Secretaries. The President will be elected by an absolute majority of the members of the Chamber.
2. To set its own budget.
3. To enact parliamentary standing order, which must be approved by an absolute majority of its members.
4. To exercise the legislative power in the autonomous community.
5. To set the budget of the autonomous community.
6. To politically control the actions of the Canary Islands Government.
7. To designate, from among its members, the Senators representing the autonomous community, ensuring adequate proportional representation.
8. To request the Government to adopt and present draft laws, and directly present bills to the Cortes Generales, in accordance with Article 87.2 of the Constitution.
9. To file appeals of unconstitutionality and appear before the Constitutional Court in the cases and under the terms provided for in the Constitution.
10. Any others powers that the Constitution, the Statute itself or the laws may assign to it.

=== Seat allocation ===
According to the Organic Law 10/1982 on the Statute of Autonomy of the Canary Islands, the Parliament of the Canary Islands was composed of 60 members. In 2018, the Organic Law 1/2018 on the Reform of the Statute of Autonomy of the Canary Islands and the Law on Elections to the Parliament of the Canary Islands was passed, increasing the number of members to 70.

The representatives are elected by the eight electoral districts of the Canary Islands, which in turn correspond to the seven islands of the autonomous community and one regional constituency. Each of these districts elects a different number of representatives:

- Fuerteventura: 8 members
- La Gomera: 4 members
- Gran Canaria: 15 members
- El Hierro: 3 members
- Lanzarote: 8 members
- La Palma: 8 members
- Tenerife: 15 members

Until 2015, the distribution of members of parliament by island did not strictly correspond to its population, but was based on what was called triple parity. This meant that both provinces elected the same number of representatives, and that both capital islands also had the same number of members of representatives, while the sum of the members of parliament from the non-capital islands was equal to the sum of those from the capital islands. This distribution created a situation where within the same autonomous community there are several of the regional electoral districts with the highest and lowest amount of representatives per capita in Spain.

The 2019 elections marked the first time the 2018 Statute reform was applied, adding a common regional constituency of nine representatives to mitigate the disparity in the "weight of the vote" between the central and peripheral islands. An additional representative was also added for Fuerteventura because the previous system allocated it fewer seats than the less populated island of La Palma. The electoral thresholds were lowered. Previously, to gain parliamentary representation, a party had to obtain 30% of the valid votes in an island constituency, or 6% across the entire autonomous community. Now, each party must obtain 15% on each island or 4% at the regional level.

== Membership ==
=== Results of the elections to the Parliament of the Canary Islands ===
Deputies in the Parliament of the Canary Islands since 1983
Key to parties PSOE AP-PDP-PL CDS UPC CNC AP AC AM AIC ICAN AHI PCN CC PCE PP FNC NCa IU ASG C’s Podemos Vox
Election	Distribution	President
1983	1 / 2 / 27 / 6 / 1 / 17	Jerónimo Saavedra (PSOE)
1987	2 / 2 / 21 / 13 / 3 / 11 / 6	Fernando Fernández Martín (CDS)
1991	5 / 23 / 7 / 1 / 2 / 16 / 6	Jerónimo Saavedra (PSOE)
1995	16 / 4 / 1 / 21 / 18	Manuel Hermoso (CC)
1999	19 / 2 / 24 / 15	Román Rodríguez (CC)
2003	17 / 3 / 23 / 17	Adán Martín (CC)
2007	26 / 19 / 15	Paulino Rivero (CC)
2011	15 / 3 / 21 / 21	Paulino Rivero (CC)
2015	7 / 15 / 3 / 5 / 18 / 12	Fernando Clavijo (CC)
2019	4 / 25 / 3 / 5 / 2 / 20 / 11	Ángel Víctor Torres (PSOE)
2023	23 / 3 / 5 / 19 / 15 / 4	Fernando Clavijo (CC)

== Internal organisation ==
During the first plenary session of the legislature, following the elections, a president, two vice-presidents, and two secretaries are elected by an absolute majority of its members to form the Bureau. Parliament will meet annually in two ordinary sessions, from September to December and from February to July.

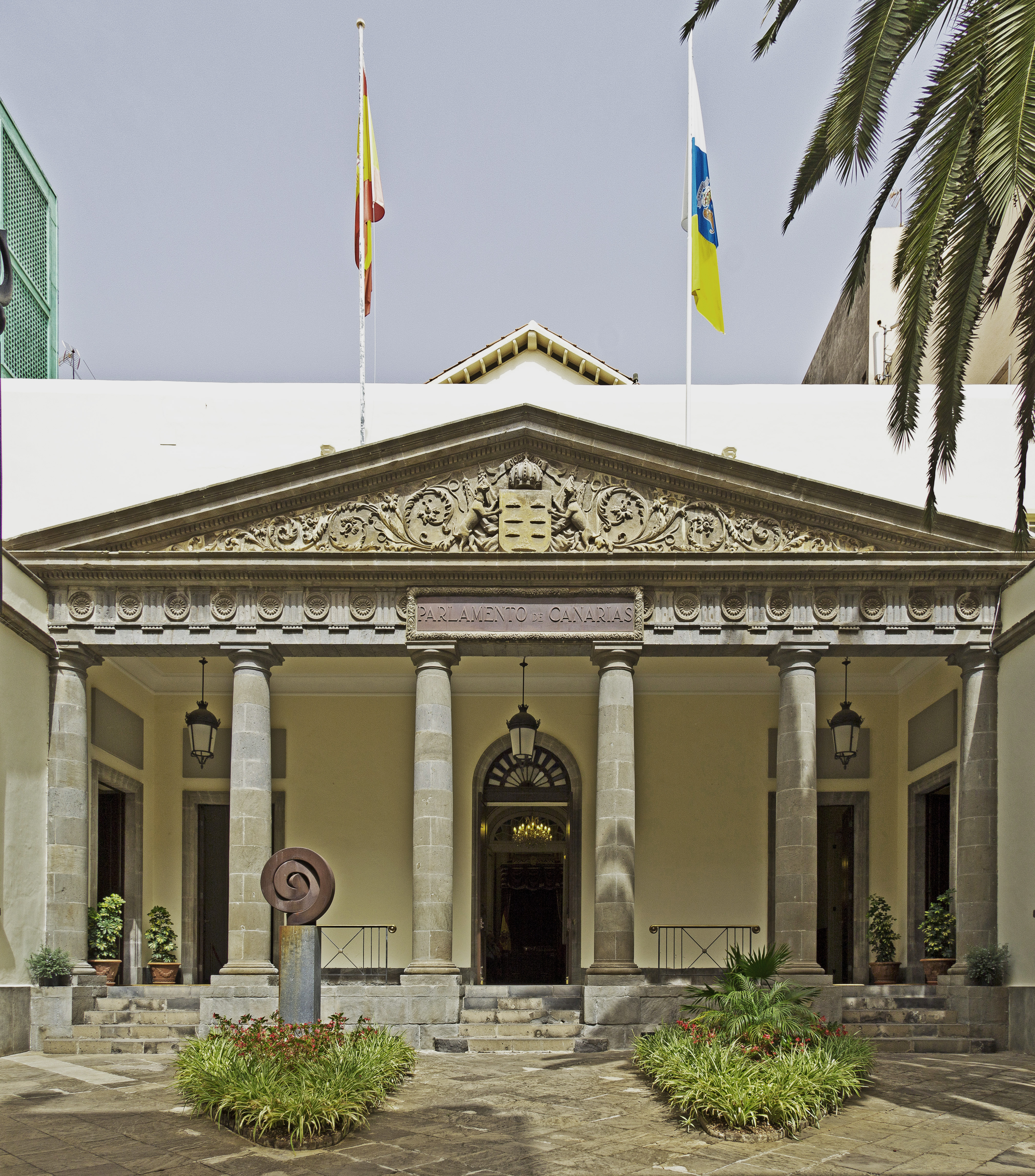
The Seat of the Parliament of the Canary Islands

Parliament works in plenary session or in committees and adopts specific rules of procedures that clarify the characteristics of these sessions, such as the formation of parliamentary groups and the functioning of the Permanent Deputation. It also addresses other matters affecting legislative procedures or political oversight. Rulings are made by simple majority, unless the Statute of Autonomy establishes special conditions that require other majority systems.

The Presidency of the Parliament of the Canary Islands is the highest body for institutional relations with other regional and national political bodies, holding the second position in the regional protocol after the President of the Canary Islands. The Presidency also holds the presidency of the Bureau, the Board of Spokespersons, and the Permanent Deputation.

== The building ==
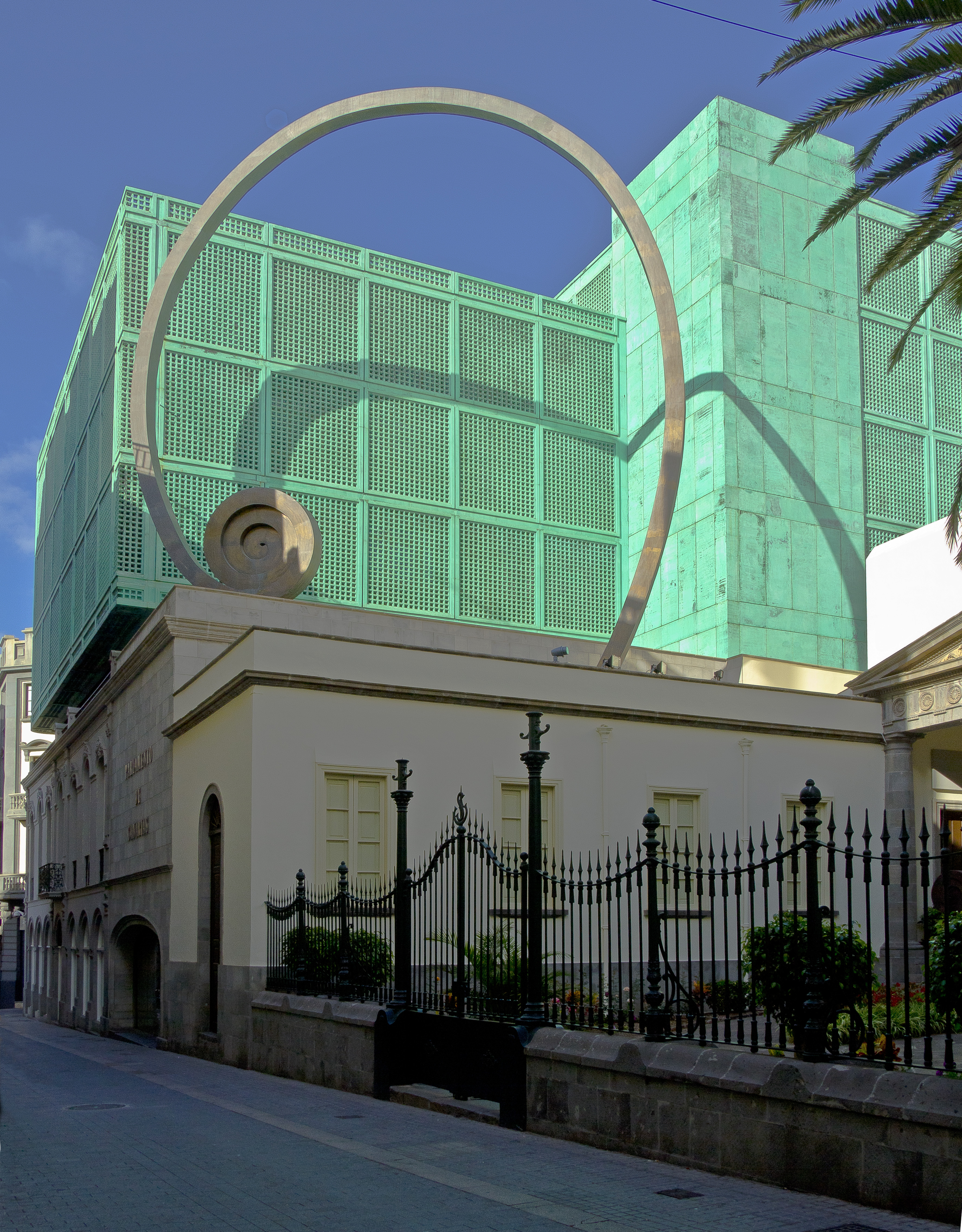
Building of the Parliament with the sculpture by Martín Chirino

The Parliament of the Canary Islands building, located on the Teobaldo Power street in the city center of Santa Cruz de Tenerife, and was designed by the architect Manuel de Oraá in 1883, in the Neoclassical style. It has the status of a Site of Cultural Interest. The building originally housed the Santa Cecilia Musical Society, and later has served as a meeting place for the representatives of the Provincial Council, the members of the Provincial Inter-Island Association and the magistrates of the Court.

Since moving into the building in 1982, the Parliament of the Canary Islands was sharing its facilities for the next two years with the Conservatory of Music, which was also located there. After this period, the Conservatory relocated, and the building became the permanent and exclusive seat of the Parliament of the Canary Islands. To adapt to its new functions, it has undergone numerous renovations and expansions through the incorporation of several historic buildings surrounding the main structure.

The Parliament building houses a collection of works by artists such as César Manrique, Pedro González, Félix Bordes, Pepe Dámaso, and José Abad. The spiral motif of Martín Chirino sculptures located in the courtyard and on the roof is the symbol of the Parliament.

== See also ==
- List of presidents of the Parliament of the Canary Islands
- List of legislatures by country
