= Lorenzo Olarte Cullen =

Canarian politician and lawyer (1932–2024)

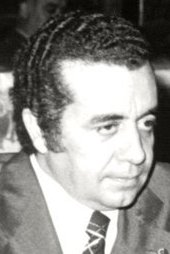
- Cullen in 1979

3rd President of the Canary Islands
- In office 1988–1991
- Preceded by: Fernando Fernández Martín
- Succeeded by: Jerónimo Saavedra Acevedo

Personal details
- Born: 8 December 1932 Ponteareas, Galicia, Spain
- Died: 2 February 2024 (aged 91) Las Palmas de Gran Canaria, Spain
- Spouse: Maria Lecuona

Lorenzo Olarte Cullen (8 December 1932 – 2 February 2024) was a Canarian politician and lawyer. He was president of the Canary Islands autonomous region but served only three years of his four-year term.

Olarte Cullen was awarded the Gran Cruz de San Raimundo de Peñafort, the highest honor for a Spanish jurist, the Gran Cruz del Mérito Civil, created by the Spanish King Alfonso XIII, recognizes the services of Spanish and foreign citizens on behalf of Spain, the Gran Cruz del Mérito Militar, for his collaboration in the decolonization of the former Spanish Sahara, the Alfonso X el Sabio, for his contribution to the development of Education and the Gran Collar de las Islas Canarias, the highest honor in the Canary Islands.

After the ban on bullfighting in Catalonia, Olarte Cullen argued that the 1991 Canarian law of animal protection did not forbid bullfighting against what was being claimed.

Olarte Cullen died on 2 February 2024, at the age of 91.

== Electoral history ==
Election	House	Constituency	Party	No.	Result
1979	Congress of Deputies	Las Palmas	UCD	1st (out of 6)	Elected
1982	Congress of Deputies	Las Palmas	CDS	1st (out of 6)	Not elected
1983	Parliament of the Canary Islands	Gran Canaria	CDS	1st (out of 15)	Elected
1987	Parliament of the Canary Islands	Gran Canaria	CDS	1st (out of 15)	Elected
1991	Parliament of the Canary Islands	Gran Canaria	CDS	1st (out of 15)	Elected
1993	Congress of Deputies	Las Palmas	CC	1st (out of 7)	Elected
1995	Parliament of the Canary Islands	Gran Canaria	CC	1st (out of 15)	Elected
2003	Parliament of the Canary Islands	Gran Canaria	UC–FNC	1st (out of 15)	Not elected
2007	Parliament of the Canary Islands	Gran Canaria	CCN	1st (out of 15)	Not elected
2007	Island Council of Gran Canaria	—	CCN	1st (out of 29)	Not elected
