= Cristina Valido García =

Spanish politician

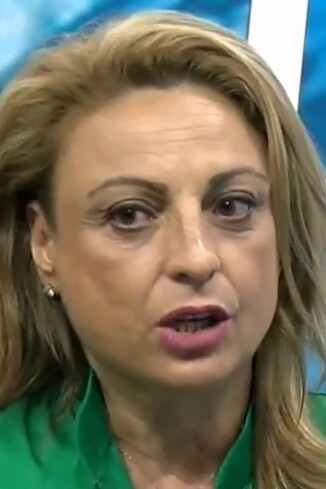
- Valido García in 2023

Member of the Congress of Deputies
- Incumbent
- Assumed office 17 August 2023
- Constituency: Santa Cruz de Tenerife

Member of the Parliament of the Canary Islands
- In office 25 June 2019 – 2 August 2023
- Constituency: Tenerife

Member of the Cabildo Insular de Tenerife
- In office 1 July 2003 – 4 January 2017
- President: Ricardo Melchior Navarro

Personal details
- Born: Cristina Valido García; 28 August 1969 (age 57) Las Palmas, Canary Islands, Spain
- Party: Canarian Coalition
- Education: University of La Laguna
- Occupation: Businesswoman • Politician

Cristina Valido García (born 28 August 1969) is a member of Canarian Coalition who serves as the party's member of the Congress of Deputies since August 2023. Between 2017 and 2019, Valido served as the counselor of employment and politics in the government of the Canary Islands under President Fernando Clavijo Batlle.

On January 18 of 2024, Valido entered a controversy regarding her words on an amendment to the Spanish Constitution; the change removed the word "reduced" (disminuidos) from Article 49. During the deputy's subsequent speech, she apologized to people with disabilities, apologizing for the delay. This was met with criticism, as the Spanish word for delay is "retraso" and the derogatory word used against disabled individuals is "retrasado".
