= President of the Canary Islands =

Public office

- Presidente de las Islas Canarias (Spanish)
- Coat of arms of the Canary Islands

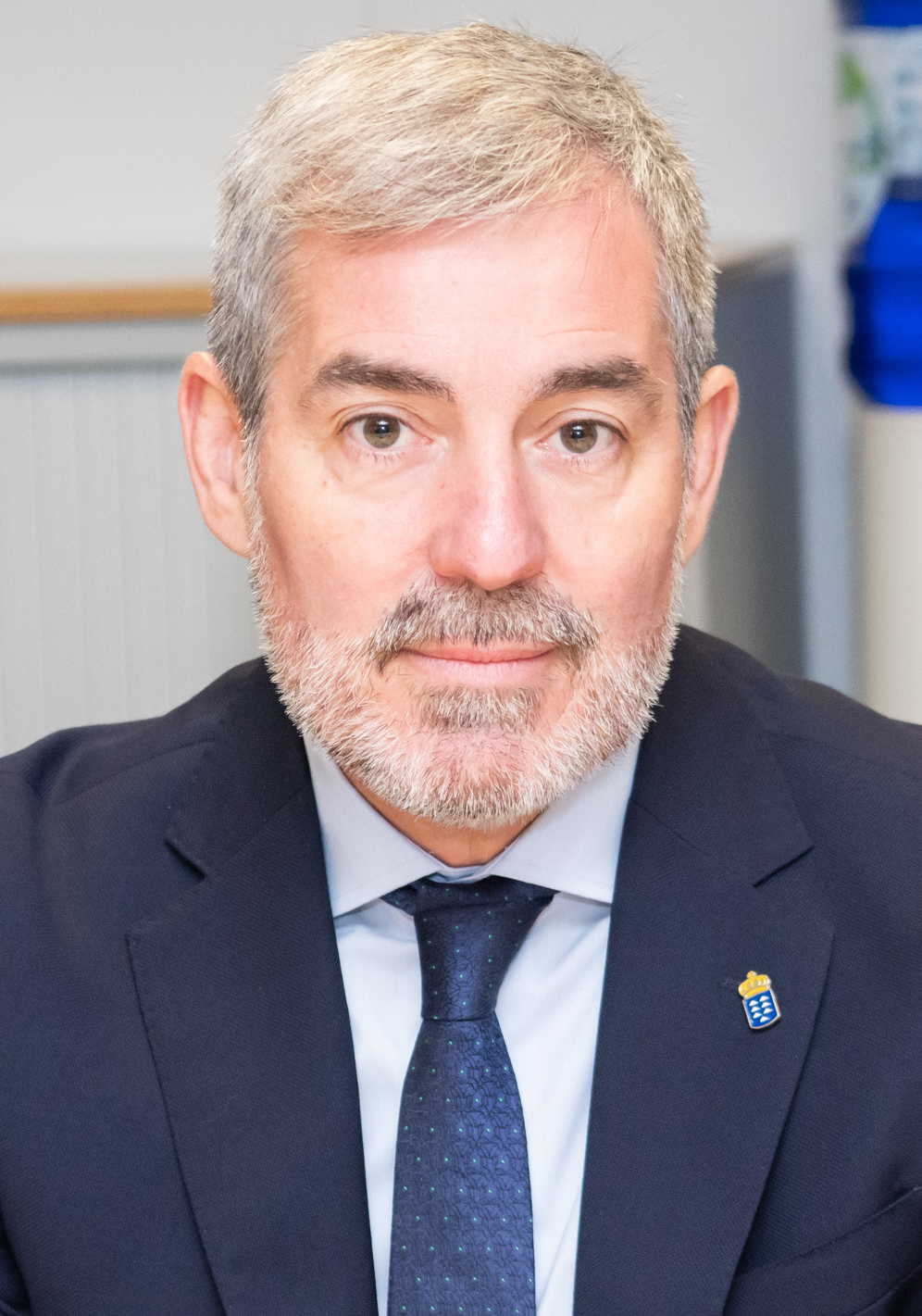
- Incumbent; Fernando Clavijo since 14 July 2023
- Executive branch of the Canary Islands
- Style: His Excellency; Mr. President
- Type: Head of government
- Nominator: Parliament of the Canary Islands
- Appointer: The Monarch countersigned by the Prime Minister
- Term length: 4 years
- Formation: 29 December 1982
- First holder: Jerónimo Saavedra
- Website: Official website

The president of the Canary Islands is the head of government of the Canary Islands, one of the 17 autonomous communities of Spain, while the monarch Felipe VI remains the head of state as king of Spain (and therefore of the Canary Islands).

== List ==
=== Presidents of the junta (pre-autonomy) ===
No.	Name (born–died)	Term of office			Political party	Ref.
No.	Name (born–died)	Took office	Left office	Time in office	Political party	Ref.
1	Alfonso Soriano Benítez de Lugo (born 1936)	14 April 1978	9 June 1979	1 year, 56 days	Union of the Democratic Centre	
2	Fernando Bergasa Perdomo (1938–2024)	9 June 1979	9 June 1980	1 year, 0 days	Union of the Democratic Centre	
3	Vicente Álvarez Pedreira (1933–2002)	9 June 1980	12 June 1981	1 year, 3 days	Union of the Democratic Centre	
4	Fernando Bergasa Perdomo (1938–2024)	12 June 1981	June 1982	1 year	Union of the Democratic Centre	
5	Francisco Javier Ucelay Sabina (1944–2001)	June 1982	29 December 1982	5 months	Union of the Democratic Centre	

=== Presidents of the government (after the approval of the Statute of Autonomy) ===
Governments:

- PSOE
- CCa
- Mixed coalition

Portrait	Name (Birth–Death)	Term of office			Party	Government Composition	Election	Monarch (Reign)	Ref.
Portrait	Name (Birth–Death)	Took office	Left office	Duration	Party	Government Composition	Election	Monarch (Reign)	Ref.
	Jerónimo Saavedra (1936–2023)	13 January 1983	10 June 1983	4 years and 202 days	PSOE	Saavedra I PSOE	N/A	King; Juan Carlos I (1975–2014)	
	Jerónimo Saavedra (1936–2023)	10 June 1983	20 July 1985	4 years and 202 days	PSOE	Saavedra II; PSOE	1983	King; Juan Carlos I (1975–2014)	
	Jerónimo Saavedra (1936–2023)	20 July 1985	3 August 1987	4 years and 202 days	PSOE	Saavedra III; PSOE	1983	King; Juan Carlos I (1975–2014)	
	Fernando Fernández Martín (born 1943)	3 August 1987	3 January 1989	1 year and 153 days	CDS	Fernández; CDS–AIC–AP	1987	King; Juan Carlos I (1975–2014)	
	Lorenzo Olarte (1932–2024)	3 January 1989	12 July 1991	2 years and 190 days	CDS	Olarte; CDS–AIC–AP	1987	King; Juan Carlos I (1975–2014)	
	Jerónimo Saavedra (1936–2023)	12 July 1991	31 March 1993 (censured)	1 year and 264 days	PSOE	Saavedra IV; PSOE–AIC	1991	King; Juan Carlos I (1975–2014)	
	Manuel Hermoso (1935–2025)	5 April 1993	15 July 1995	6 years and 103 days	CCa (AIC)	Hermoso I CCa	1991	King; Juan Carlos I (1975–2014)	
	Manuel Hermoso (1935–2025)	15 July 1995	17 July 1999	6 years and 103 days	CCa (AIC)	Hermoso II; CCa until May 1996; CCa–PP from May 1996	1995	King; Juan Carlos I (1975–2014)	
	Román Rodríguez (born 1956)	17 July 1999	5 July 2003	3 years and 353 days	CCa (ICAN)	Rodríguez; CCa–PP until May 2002; CCa from May 2002	1999	King; Juan Carlos I (1975–2014)	
	Adán Martín (1943–2010)	5 July 2003	13 July 2007	4 years and 8 days	CCa (ATI)	Martín; CCa–PP until May 2005; CCa from May 2005	2003	King; Juan Carlos I (1975–2014)	
	Paulino Rivero (born 1952)	13 July 2007	7 July 2011	7 years and 361 days	CCa	Rivero I CCa–PP until Oct 2010; CCa from Oct 2010	2007	King; Juan Carlos I (1975–2014)	
	Paulino Rivero (born 1952)	7 July 2011	9 July 2015	7 years and 361 days	CCa	Rivero II; CCa–PSOE	2011	King; Felipe VI (2014–present)	
	Fernando Clavijo (born 1971)	9 July 2015	16 July 2019	4 years and 7 days	CCa	Clavijo I CCa–PSOE until Dec 2016; CCa from Dec 2016	2015	King; Felipe VI (2014–present)	
	Ángel Víctor Torres (born 1966)	16 July 2019	14 July 2023	3 years and 363 days	PSOE	Torres; PSOE–NCa–Podemos–ASG	2019	King; Felipe VI (2014–present)	
	Fernando Clavijo (born 1971)	14 July 2023	Incumbent	3 years and 55 days	CCa	Clavijo II; CCa–PP–AHI–ASG	2023	King; Felipe VI (2014–present)	

== Sources ==
- World Statesmen.org
