= Ana Oramas =

Spanish politician (born 1959)

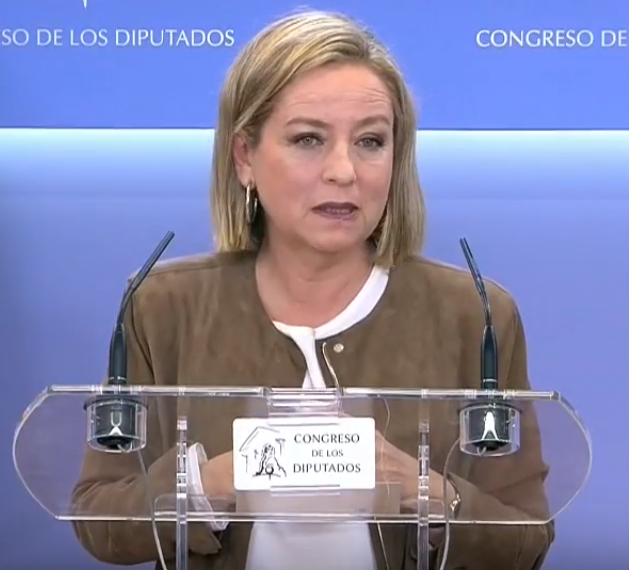
- Ana Oramas in 2019

Member of the Parliament of the Canary Islands
- Incumbent
- Assumed office 27 June 2023
- Constituency: Tenerife
- In office 26 May 1991 – 3 June 1999
- Constituency: Tenerife

Member of the Congress of Deputies
- In office 25 June 2007 – 30 May 2023
- Constituency: Santa Cruz de Tenerife

Mayor of San Cristóbal de La Laguna
- In office 4 July 1999 – 21 November 2008
- Preceded by: Elfidio Alonso Quintero
- Succeeded by: Fernando Clavijo Batlle

Member of the Santa Cruz de Tenerife City Council
- In office 3 February 1979 – 26 May 1991

Personal details
- Born: Ana María Oramas González-Moro; 17 July 1959 (age 66) Santa Cruz de Tenerife, Canary Islands, Spain
- Party: Canarian Coalition (1992–present)
- Other political affiliations: Union of the Democratic Centre (1978–1982)
- Children: 1
- Education: University of La Laguna

Ana María Oramas González-Moro (born 17 July 1959) is a Spanish politician who has been a member of the Parliament of the Canary Islands from 1991 to 1999, and since 2023. She was a member of the Santa Cruz de Tenerife City Council from 1979 to 1991, mayor of San Cristóbal de La Laguna from 1999 to 2008, and a member of the Congress of Deputies from 2007 to 2023. She is a member of the Canarian Coalition.

== Early life and education ==
Ana María Oramas González-Moro was born in Santa Cruz de Tenerife, on 17 July 1959, as the eldest of ten children. She graduated from University of La Laguna with a degree in economics.

== Career ==
Oramas joined the Union of the Democratic Centre in 1978, and then the Canarian Coalition (CC) in 1982. From 1979 to 1991, she was a member of the Santa Cruz de Tenerife City Council. Oramas was elected as mayor of San Cristóbal de La Laguna in 1999. On 12 November 2008, she resigned from the council and as mayor, but maintained her seat in the Congress of Deputies. CC selected Leonarda Santana to replace her in its municipal electoral list.

In the 2004 election Oramas was the fourth person on the CC's electoral list and was not elected. However, Paulino Rivero, who was elected, stepped down in 2007, and Oramas replaced him on 25 June. She won in the 2008 election. During Oramas' tenure in the chamber she has served on the Economy and Finance, Constitutional Affairs, and Culture committees.

From 1991 to 1999, Oramas was a member of the Parliament of the Canary Islands. Under President Manuel Hermoso she held multiple regional administrative positions. Oramas declined to seek reelection to the Chamber of Deputies in 2023 and instead won a seat in parliament in the 2023 election. During her tenure in parliament she served as president of the Disability commission.

== Personal life ==
Oramas is married and is the mother of one child.

== Works cited ==
=== News ===
- "Ana Oramas dejará la política nacional y será candidata al Parlamento de Canarias". Diario de Canarias. 23 September 2022. Archived from the original on 27 June 2025.
- "Ana Oramas dimite como alcaldesa de La Laguna". La Opinión de Tenerife. 13 November 2008. Archived from the original on 4 November 2011.
- "Ana Oramas replaces Paulino Rivero as CC deputy in Congress this Tuesday". La Voz de Lanzarote. 25 June 2007. Archived from the original on 27 June 2025.
- Mayorga, Sonoles (3 November 2011). "Ana Oramas, la socia canaria de Zapatero en las decisiones más difíciles". RTVE. Archived from the original on 27 June 2025.
- Yubero, Andrea (4 June 2020). "Ana Oramas; concejal con 19 años y cuatro décadas después cobra 4.184 euros brutos y casi 2.000 libres de impuestos al mes". Sueldos Públicos. Archived from the original on 27 June 2025.

=== Web ===
- "Ana M. Oramas González-Moro". Parliament of the Canary Islands. Archived from the original on 27 June 2025.
