= Patricia Hernández (politician) =

Spanish politician

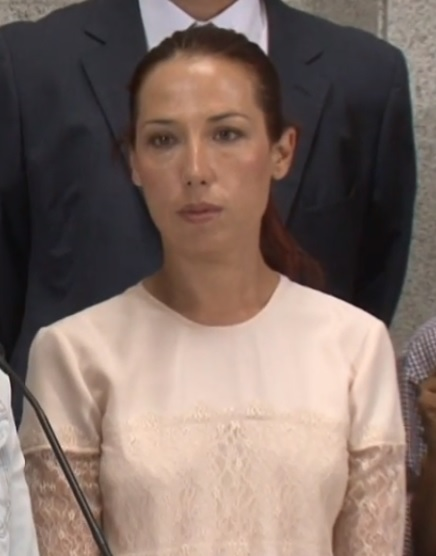

Mayor of Santa Cruz de Tenerife
- Incumbent
- Assumed office 2019

Member of the Congress of Deputies
- In office 2011–2015
- Constituency: Santa Cruz de Tenerife

Member of the Senate of Spain
- In office 2004–2011
- Constituency: Tenerife

Personal details
- Born: 21 February 1980 (age 46) Santa Cruz de Tenerife, Canary Islands, Spain
- Party: Socialist Party of the Canaries
- Education: University of La Laguna

Patricia Hernández Gutiérrez (born 21 February 1980) is a Spanish politician representing the Canary Islands; she was the leader of the Socialist Party of the Canaries (PSOE) in the Parliament, and the mayor of Santa Cruz de Tenerife since 2019.

== Early life ==
Born in Santa Cruz de Tenerife, Hernández graduated with a degree in labour relations from the University of La Laguna (1998–2002). Previously she studied cello at the Conservatory of Music of the Canary Islands (1990–1998).

== Career ==
A member of the Socialist Party of the Canaries (PSOE), Hernández represented Santa Cruz de Tenerife in the Cortes Generales from 2004 to 2015, as a senator for seven years and later as a deputy. Within her party administration she has served as the General Secretary of Socialist Youth of Spain in Tenerife (2002–2008) and since 2013, has been the PSOE general secretary from Tenerife.

The Association of Parliamentary Journalists have honoured her with their "Senator Revelation" title. After defeating Carolina Darias San Sebastián and Gustavo Matos in the primary elections of PSOE in October 2014, she became the first women candidate for the post of President of the Canary Islands. However, PSOE formed a coalition with the Canarian Coalition after the results of the 2015 Canarian regional election were announced and Hernández was chosen the Vice President and Councilor for Employment, Social Policies and Housing.

On June 15, 2019 she became the first socialist mayor of Santa Cruz de Tenerife, ending forty uninterrupted years of Canarian Coalition governments in the capital, being also the first woman to hold the mayor's office of Santa Cruz.
