= First government of Fernando Clavijo =

1st government of Fernando Clavijo
- Government of the Canary Islands
- 2015–2019
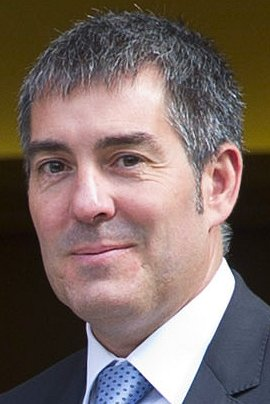
- Date formed: 10 July 2015
- Date dissolved: 17 July 2019

People and organisations
- Head of state: Felipe VI
- Head of government: Fernando Clavijo
- Deputy head of government: Patricia Hernández (2015-16); Pablo Rodríguez (2017-19)
- No. of ministers: 11 (2015–19); 9 (2019)
- Ministers removed: 7
- Total no. of members: 16
- Member party: CCa; PSOE (2015–2016)
- Status in legislature: Majority coalition (2015-16) 33 / 60 (55%); Minority government (2017-19) 18 / 60 (30%)
- Opposition party: PP (2015–2016); PSOE (2016–2019)
- Opposition leader: Australia Navarro (2015–16); Patricia Hernández (2016–19)

History
- Election: 24 May 2015
- Outgoing election: 26 May 2019
- Legislature term: 9th Parliament
- Predecessor: Rivero II
- Successor: Torres

The Clavijo government was the regional government of the Canary Islands led by President Fernando Clavijo. It was formed in July 2015 after the regional election and ended in July 2019 following the regional election.

== Government ==
Name	Portrait	Party	Office	Took office	Left office	^{Refs.}
Fernando Clavijo		Canarian Coalition	President	8 July 2015	15 July 2019	
Patricia Hernández		Socialist Party of the Canaries	Vice President	10 July 2015	23 December 2016	
Patricia Hernández		Socialist Party of the Canaries	Minister of Employment, Social Policy and Housing	10 July 2015	23 December 2016	
Pablo Rodríguez		Canarian Coalition	Vice President	9 January 2017	17 July 2019	
Pablo Rodríguez		Canarian Coalition	Minister of Public Works and Transportation	9 January 2017	17 July 2019	
Aarón Afonso		Socialist Party of the Canaries	Minister of the Presidency, Justice and Equality	10 July 2015	23 December 2016	
José Manuel Baltar		Canarian Coalition	Minister of Health	9 January 2017	17 July 2019	
José Miguel Barragán		Canarian Coalition	Minister of the Presidency, Justice and Equality	9 January 2017	17 July 2019	
Nieves Barreto		Canarian Coalition	Minister of Territorial Policy, Sustainability and Security	10 July 2015	17 June 2019	
Isaac Castellano		Canarian Coalition	Minister of Tourism, Culture and Sports	1 August 2017	17 July 2019	
Ornella Chacón		Socialist Party of the Canaries	Minister of Public Works and Transportation	10 July 2015	23 December 2016	
Rosa Dávila		Canarian Coalition	Minister of Finance	10 July 2015	25 June 2019	
María Teresa Lorenzo		Canarian Coalition	Minister of Tourism, Culture and Sports	10 July 2015	31 July 2017	
Soledad Monzón		Canarian Coalition	Minister of Education and Universities	10 July 2015	17 July 2019	
Jesús Morera		Socialist Party of the Canaries	Minister of Health	10 July 2015	23 December 2016	
Pedro Ortega		Canarian Coalition	Minister of Economy, Industry, Commerce and Knowledge	10 July 2015	17 July 2019	
Narvay Quintero		Canarian Coalition	Minister of Agriculture, Livestock, Fisheries and Water	10 July 2015	17 July 2019	
Cristina Valido		Canarian Coalition	Minister of Employment, Social Policy and Housing	9 January 2017	17 July 2019	
