= 2007 Canarian regional election =

Election in the Spanish region of the Canary Islands

- 27 May 2007

All 60 seats in the Parliament of the Canary Islands 31 seats needed for a majority
- Opinion polls
- Registered: 1,556,587 ▲8.1%
- Turnout: 940,852 (60.4%) ▼4.2 pp
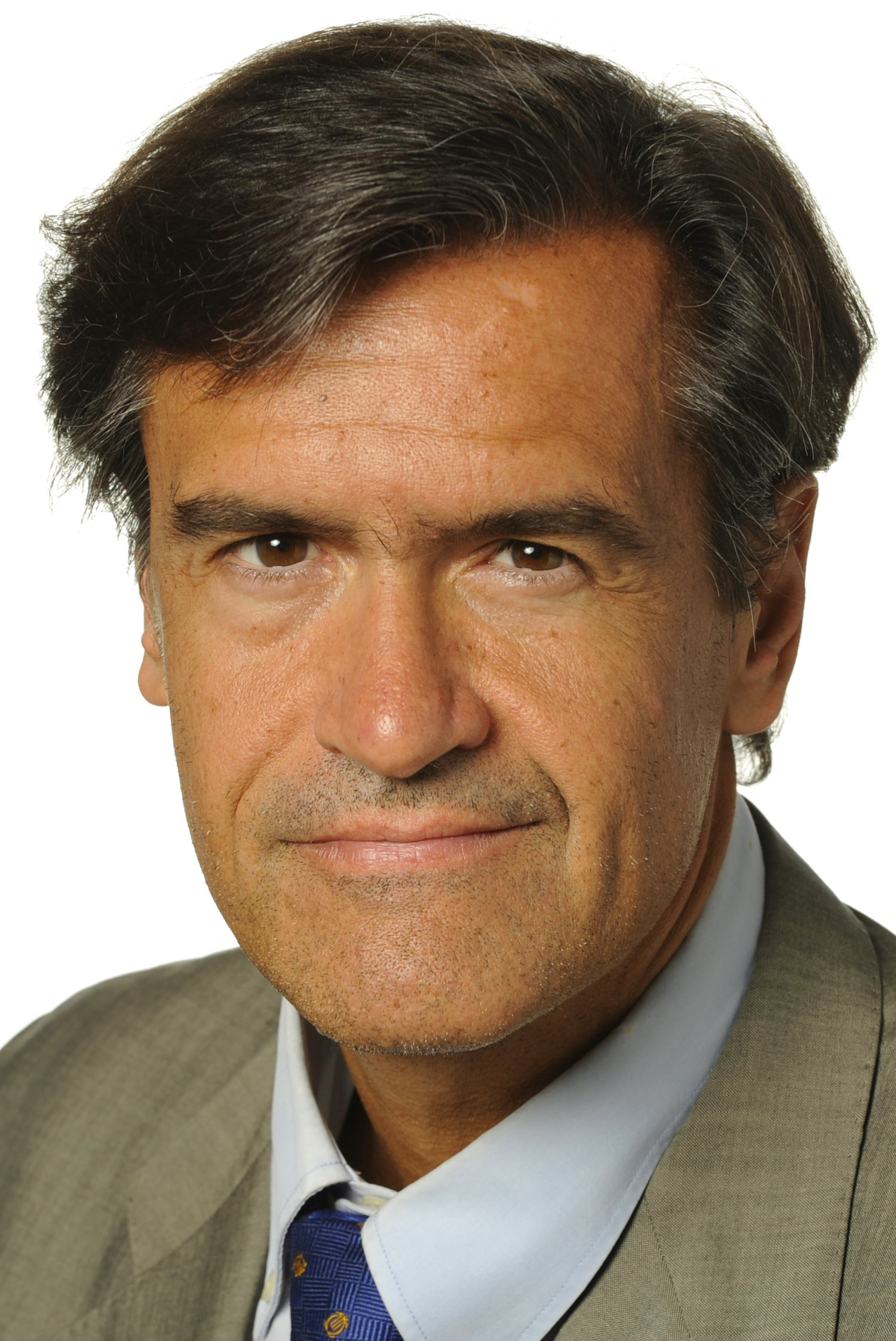

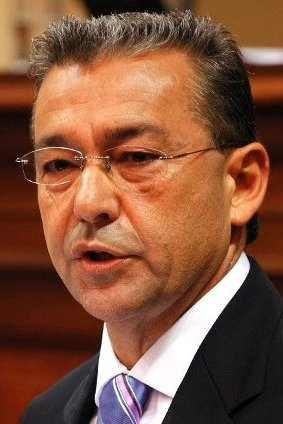

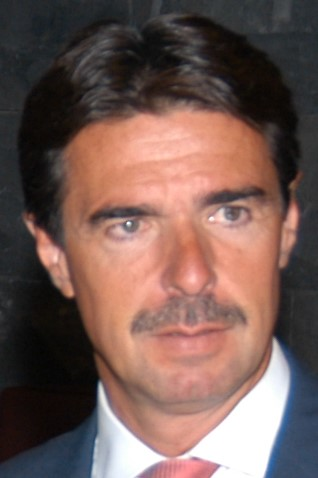
	First party	Second party	Third party
Leader	Juan Fernando López Aguilar	Paulino Rivero	José Manuel Soria
Party	PSOE	CC–PNC	PP
Leader since	28 October 2006	3 February 2007	3 October 1999
Leader's seat	Gran Canaria	Tenerife	Gran Canaria
Last election	17 seats, 25.4%	23 seats, 36.3% (Note: Results for CC (32.9%, 23 seats) and FNC (3.4%, 0 seats)—not including Lanzarote—in the 2003 election.)	17 seats, 30.6%
Seats won	26	19	15
Seat change	▲9	▼4	▼2
Popular vote	322,833	225,878	224,883
Percentage	34.5%	24.1%	24.0%
Swing	▲9.1 pp	▼12.2 pp	▼6.6 pp
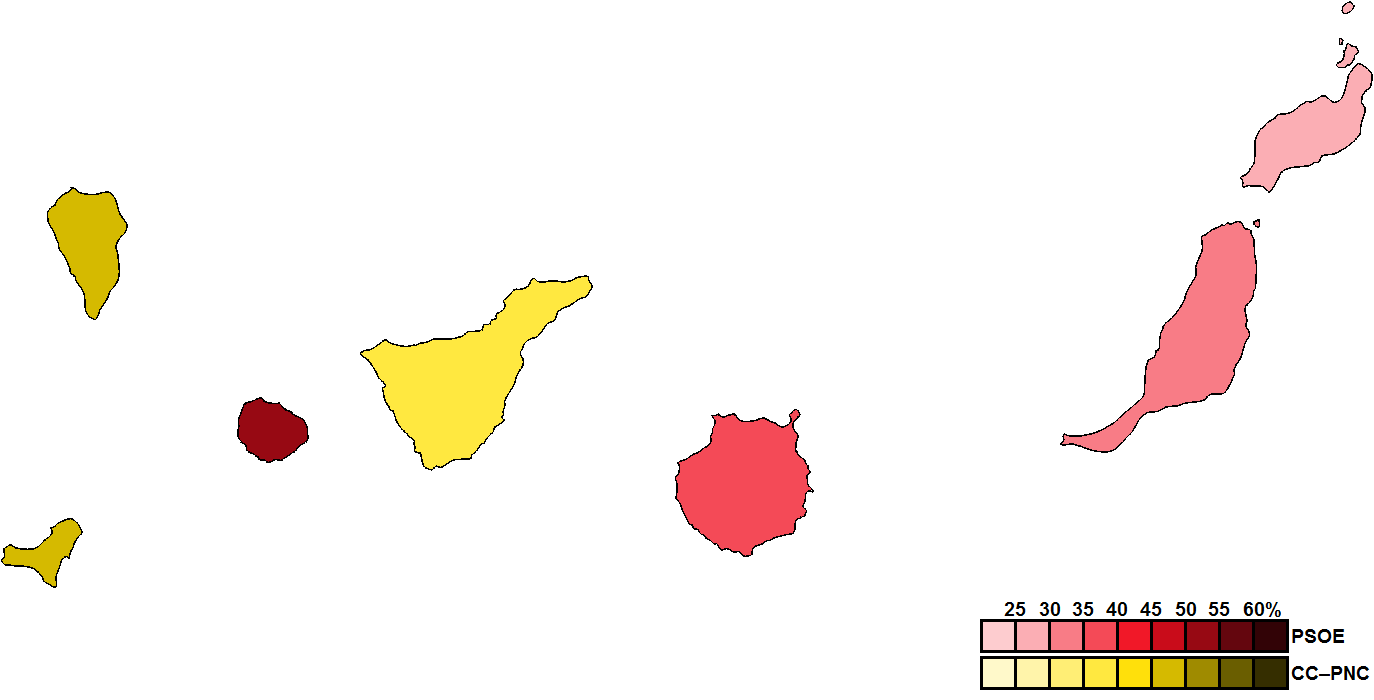
- Constituency results map for the Parliament of the Canary Islands
President before election
Adán Martín
CC
President after election
Paulino Rivero
CC

A regional election was held in the Canary Islands on 27 May 2007 to elect the 7th Parliament of the autonomous community. All 60 seats in the Parliament were up for election. It was held concurrently with regional elections in twelve other autonomous communities and local elections all across Spain.

== Overview ==
Under the 1982 Statute of Autonomy, the Parliament of the Canary Islands was the unicameral legislature of the homonymous autonomous community, having legislative power in devolved matters, as well as the ability to grant or withdraw confidence from a regional president. The electoral and procedural rules were supplemented by national law provisions.

=== Date ===
The term of the Parliament of the Canary Islands expired four years after the date of its previous ordinary election, with election day being fixed for the fourth Sunday of May every four years. The election decree was required to be issued no later than 54 days before the scheduled election date and published on the following day in the Official Gazette of the Canaries (BOC). The previous election was held on 25 May 2003, setting the date for election day on the fourth Sunday of May four years later, which was 27 May 2007.

The Parliament of the Canary Islands could not be dissolved before the expiration date of parliament, except in the event of an investiture process failing to elect a regional president within a two-month period from the first ballot. In such a case, the Parliament was to be automatically dissolved and a snap election called, with elected lawmakers serving the remainder of its original four-year term.

The election to the Parliament of the Canary Islands was officially called on 3 April 2007 with the publication of the corresponding decree in the BOC, setting election day for 27 May.

=== Electoral system ===
Voting for the Parliament was based on universal suffrage, comprising all Spanish nationals over 18 years of age, registered in the Canary Islands and with full political rights, provided that they had not been deprived of the right to vote by a final sentence, nor were legally incapacitated.

The Parliament of the Canary Islands had a minimum of 50 and a maximum of 70 seats, with electoral provisions fixing its size at 60. All were elected in seven multi-member constituencies—corresponding to the islands of El Hierro, Fuerteventura, Gran Canaria, La Gomera, La Palma, Lanzarote and Tenerife, each of which was assigned a fixed number of seats—using the D'Hondt method and closed-list proportional voting, with a 30 percent-threshold of valid votes (including blank ballots) in each constituency or six percent regionally.

As a result of the aforementioned allocation, each Parliament constituency was entitled the following seats:

Seats	Constituencies
15	Gran Canaria, Tenerife
8	La Palma, Lanzarote
7	Fuerteventura
4	La Gomera
3	El Hierro

The law did not provide for by-elections to fill vacant seats; instead, any vacancies arising after the proclamation of candidates and during the legislative term were filled by the next candidates on the party lists or, when required, by designated substitutes.

=== Outgoing parliament ===
The table below shows the composition of the parliamentary groups in the chamber at the time of the election call.

Parliamentary composition in April 2007
Groups	Parties	Legislators	
Groups	Parties	Seats	Total
Canarian Coalition Parliamentary Group (CC)	CC	21	23
Canarian Coalition Parliamentary Group (CC)	AHI	2	23
Canarian Socialist Parliamentary Group	PSOE	17	17
People's Parliamentary Group	PP	16	16
Mixed Parliamentary Group	PIL	3	3
Non-Inscrits	CCN	1 (Note: Alejandro Díaz, former PP legislator.)	1

== Parties and candidates ==
The electoral law allowed for parties and federations registered in the interior ministry, alliances and groupings of electors to present lists of candidates. Parties and federations intending to form an alliance were required to inform the relevant electoral commission within 10 days of the election call, whereas groupings of electors needed to secure the signature of at least one percent of the electorate in the constituencies for which they sought election, disallowing electors from signing for more than one list. Amendments earlier in 2007 required a balanced composition of men and women in the electoral lists, so that candidates of either sex made up at least 40 percent of the total composition.

Below is a list of the main parties and alliances which contested the election:

Candidacy	Parties and alliances	Candidate	Ideology	Previous result		Gov.	Ref.
Candidacy	Parties and alliances	Candidate	Ideology	Vote %	Seats	Gov.	Ref.
CC–PNC	List: Canarian Coalition (CC); Canarian Nationalist Party (PNC); Independent Herrenian Group (AHI)	Paulino Rivero	Regionalism; Canarian nationalism Centrism	36.3%	23	Yes	
PP	List: People's Party (PP)	José Manuel Soria	Conservatism; Christian democracy	30.6%	17	No	
PSOE	List: Spanish Socialist Workers' Party (PSOE)	Juan Fernando López Aguilar	Social democracy	25.4%	17	No	
CCN	List: Nationalist Canarian Centre (CCN); Lanzarote Independents Party (PIL); Independents of Fuerteventura (IF)	Ignacio González Santiago	Canarian nationalism Centrism	1.4% (Note: Results for FNC in Lanzarote in the 2003 election.)	3	No	
NCa	List: New Canaries (NCa); Nationalist Party of Lanzarote (PNL); Initiative for La Palma (ILP)	Román Rodríguez	Canarian nationalism Social democracy	Did not contest		No	

== Opinion polls ==
The tables below list opinion polling results in reverse chronological order, showing the most recent first and using the dates when the survey fieldwork was done, as opposed to the date of publication. Where the fieldwork dates are unknown, the date of publication is given instead. The highest percentage figure in each polling survey is displayed with its background shaded in the leading party's colour. If a tie ensues, this is applied to the figures with the highest percentages. The "Lead" column on the right shows the percentage-point difference between the parties with the highest percentages in a poll.

=== Voting intention estimates ===
The table below lists weighted voting intention estimates. Refusals are generally excluded from the party vote percentages, while question wording and the treatment of "don't know" responses and those not intending to vote may vary between polling organisations. When available, seat projections determined by the polling organisations are displayed below (or in place of) the percentages in a smaller font; 31 seats were required for an absolute majority in the Parliament of the Canary Islands.

Color key:

Exit poll

Polling firm/Commissioner	Fieldwork date	Sample size	Turnout	CC	PP	PSOE	PIL	IUC	NCa	Lead
2007 regional election	27 May 2007	—N/a	60.4	24.2; 19	24.0; 15	34.5; 26	1.0; 0	0.7; 0	5.4; 0	10.3
Ipsos/RTVE–FORTA	27 May 2007	?	?	21.0; 14/16	24.0; 17/20	36.0; 25/28	–	–	–	12.0
Hamalgama Métrica/La Provincia	20 May 2007	?	?	? 21	? 16/17	? 22/23	–	–	–	?
Demométrica/Canarias7	19 May 2007	?	?	25.9; 19/22	26.9; 14/18	33.3; 21/24	2.3; 0	–	6.1; 0/2	6.4
Opina/El País	14–17 May 2007	?	?	23.0; 16/17	30.0; 17	37.5; 24/25	2.5; 2	–	–	7.5
Celeste-Tel/Terra	9–15 May 2007	?	?	26.3; 19	29.6; 18	30.9; 21/22	? 1/2	2.1; 0	–	1.3
Opina/Cadena SER	11 May 2007	1,200	?	23.0; 16/17	30.0; 17	36.0; 23/24	3.0; 3	–	–	6.0
Sigma Dos/El Mundo	27 Apr–8 May 2007	1,200	?	27.8; 19/22	30.2; 16/19	31.5; 18/23	2.9; 0/3	–	2.4; 0	1.3
CIS	9 Apr–6 May 2007	1,785	?	25.0; 19/20	28.3; 18/19	29.3; 22	–	2.5; 0	2.8; 0	1.0
PSOE	18–23 Feb 2007	2,500	?	? 18	? 15	? 26	–	–	? 1	?
Demométrica/Canarias7	9–24 Jan 2007	3,200	?	? 16/18	? 15/17	? 22/25	? 0/2	–	? 2	?
Sigma Dos/El Mundo	16–24 Nov 2006	?	?	? 19/22	? 16/19	? 19/22	? 0/3	–	–	?
Hamalgama Métrica/La Provincia	2–11 Nov 2006	1,920	?	23.5; 18	25.8; 15/16	36.7; 24/25	? 0/1	–	? 2	10.9
Demométrica/Canarias7	19 Apr–9 May 2006	?	?	? 17/18	? 16/18	? 23/25	? 0	–	? 2	?
TNS Demoscopia/CC (Note: "Encuesta de 'clima' político-electoral de Canarias" (PDF). TNS Demoscopia (in Spanish). 27 January 2006. Archived from the original on 10 December 2010.)	25 Nov–3 Dec 2005	2,006	?	34.3; 24/25	29.0; 18	26.9; 17/18	–	1.7; 0	–	5.3
2004 EP election	13 Jun 2004	—N/a	36.5	16.9	40.0	38.5	–	1.8	–	1.5
2004 general election	14 Mar 2004	—N/a	66.7	24.3	35.4	34.5	–	1.9	–	0.9
2003 regional election	25 May 2003	—N/a	64.6	32.9; 23	30.6; 17	25.4; 17	1.4; 3	1.3; 0	–	2.3

=== Voting preferences ===
The table below lists raw, unweighted voting preferences.

Polling firm/Commissioner	Fieldwork date	Sample size	CC	PP	PSOE	IUC	NCa	Question	X mark	Lead
2007 regional election (Note: Does not include non-resident citizens.)	27 May 2007	—N/a	14.8	15.4	22.0	0.3	3.5	—N/a	36.2	6.6
CIS	9 Apr–6 May 2007	1,785	14.6	14.0	19.8	1.9	1.7	34.1	7.3	5.2
TNS Demoscopia/CC	25 Nov–3 Dec 2005	2,006	26.9	22.6	21.5	1.7	–	13.1	7.5	4.3
2004 EP election	13 Jun 2004	—N/a	5.8	15.0	14.3	0.7	–	—N/a	63.1	0.7
2004 general election	14 Mar 2004	—N/a	15.8	24.1	23.5	1.3	–	—N/a	32.3	0.6
2003 regional election	25 May 2003	—N/a	21.5	20.4	16.8	0.9	–	—N/a	33.6	1.1

=== Victory preferences ===
The table below lists opinion polling on the victory preferences for each party in the event of a regional election taking place.

Polling firm/Commissioner	Fieldwork date	Sample size	CC	PP	PSOE	IUC	NCa	Other/ None	Question	Lead
CIS	9 Apr–6 May 2007	1,785	19.1	18.0	25.6	2.4	2.7	12.2	20.0	6.5

=== Victory likelihood ===
The table below lists opinion polling on the perceived likelihood of victory for each party in the event of a regional election taking place.

Polling firm/Commissioner	Fieldwork date	Sample size	CC	PP	PSOE	IUC	NCa	Other/ None	Question	Lead
CIS	9 Apr–6 May 2007	1,785	28.1	13.6	21.1	0.6	1.2	3.6	31.7	7.0

=== Preferred President ===
The table below lists opinion polling on leader preferences to become president of the Canary Islands.

Polling firm/Commissioner	Fieldwork date	Sample size							Other/ None/ Not care	Question	Lead
Polling firm/Commissioner	Fieldwork date	Sample size	Martín CC	Rivero CC	Soria PP	L. Aguilar PSOE	Delgado IUC	Rodríguez NCa	Other/ None/ Not care	Question	Lead
Opina/El País	14–17 May 2007	?	–	–	–	28.0	–	–	–	–	?
CIS	9 Apr–6 May 2007	1,785	–	16.3	18.3	21.0	0.7	6.0	4.1	33.7	2.7
Hamalgama Métrica/La Provincia	2–11 Nov 2006	1,920	13.2	–	15.6	18.2	–	–	53.0		2.6

== Results ==
=== Overall ===
← Summary of the 27 May 2007 Parliament of the Canary Islands election results →
Parties and alliances	Popular vote			Seats	
Parties and alliances	Votes	%	±pp	Total	+/−
Spanish Socialist Workers' Party (PSOE)	322,833	34.51	+9.09	26	+9
Canarian Coalition–Canarian Nationalist Party (CC–PNC)^{1}	225,878	24.15	−12.12	19	−4
People's Party (PP)	224,883	24.04	−6.57	15	−2
New Canaries (NCa)	50,749	5.43	New	0	±0
Canarian Centre (CCN)^{2}	46,676	4.99	+3.58	0	−3
The Greens (Verdes)	17,793	1.90	−0.08	0	±0
Commitment to Gran Canaria (CGCa)	8,512	0.91	New	0	±0
Canarian United Left (IUC)	6,558	0.70	−0.61	0	±0
Canarian Popular Alternative–25 May Citizens' Alternative (APCa–AC25M)^{3}	4,824	0.52	−0.50	0	±0
Canarian Nationalist Alternative (ANC)	2,539	0.27	New	0	±0
Unity of the People (UP)	1,485	0.16	New	0	±0
Communist Party of the Canarian People (PCPC)	1,338	0.14	−0.05	0	±0
Nationalist Maga Alternative (AMAGA)	1,079	0.12	New	0	±0
Party of Gran Canaria (PGC)	1,073	0.11	New	0	±0
Centre Coalition (CCCAN)	1,006	0.11	New	0	±0
Movement for the Unity of the Canarian People (MUPC)	888	0.09	New	0	±0
Alternative Island (ISAL)	870	0.09	New	0	±0
Humanist Party (PH)	777	0.08	−0.06	0	±0
Citizens' Union–Independent Progressives of Canaries (UC–PIC)	557	0.06	New	0	±0
Commitment to Tenerife (CTF)	466	0.05	New	0	±0
The Phalanx (FE)	327	0.03	New	0	±0
National Democracy (DN)	302	0.03	−0.01	0	±0
Citizens' Initiative for Fuerteventura (ICF)	286	0.03	New	0	±0
Pensionist Assembly of the Canaries (TPC)	280	0.03	−0.02	0	±0
Canarian Nationalist Party (PNC)^{4}	244	0.03	−0.02	0	±0
Blank ballots	13,237	1.42	+0.14		
Total	935,460			60	±0
Valid votes	935,460	99.43	−0.01		
Invalid votes	5,392	0.57	+0.01		
Votes cast / turnout	940,852	60.44	−4.18		
Abstentions	615,735	39.56	+4.18		
Registered voters	1,556,587				
Sources
Footnotes: ^{1} Canarian Coalition–Canarian Nationalist Party results are compared to the combined totals of Canarian Coalition and Canarian Nationalist Federation in Fuerteventura, Gran Canaria, La Gomera and Tenerife in the 2003 election.; ^{2} Canarian Centre results are compared to Canarian Nationalist Federation totals in Lanzarote in the 2003 election.; ^{3} Canarian Popular Alternative–25 May Citizens' Alternative results are compared to the combined totals of Canarian Popular Alternative and 25 May Citizens' Alternative in the 2003 election.; ^{4} Canarian Nationalist Party results are compared to Canarian Nationalist Federation totals in El Hierro in the 2003 election.

Popular vote
PSOE	34.51%
CC–PNC	24.15%
PP	24.04%
NCa	5.43%
CCN	4.99%
Verdes	1.90%
Others	3.57%
Blank ballots	1.42%

Seats
PSOE	43.33%
CC–PNC	31.67%
PP	25.00%

=== Distribution by constituency ===
Constituency	PSOE		CC–PNC		PP	
Constituency	%	S	%	S	%	S
El Hierro	23.5	1	47.1	2	19.8	−
Fuerteventura	32.3	3	30.3	2	23.9	2
Gran Canaria	37.9	7	5.4	1	34.2	7
La Gomera	54.8	3	31.9	1	5.0	−
La Palma	28.2	3	46.2	4	17.0	1
Lanzarote	28.7	4	18.7	2	15.2	2
Tenerife	32.2	5	39.6	7	16.5	3
Total	34.5	26	24.1	19	24.0	15

== Aftermath ==
=== Government formation ===
Investiture; Nomination of Paulino Rivero (CC)
Ballot →	11 July 2007
Required majority →	31 out of 60
Yes: • CC–PNC (19); • PP (15)	34 / 60
No: • PSOE (26)	26 / 60
Abstentions	0 / 60
Absentees	0 / 60

== Bibliography ==
- Ley Orgánica 10/1982, de 10 de agosto, de Estatuto de Autonomía de Canarias (Organic Law 10/1982). Official State Gazette (in Spanish). 10 August 1982 [version as of 2 July 2002]. BOE-A-1982-20821.
- Ley Orgánica 5/1985, de 19 de junio, del Régimen Electoral General (Organic Law 5/1985). Official State Gazette (in Spanish). 19 June 1985 [version as of 20 April 2007]. BOE-A-1985-11672.
- Ley 7/2003, de 20 de marzo, de Elecciones al Parlamento de Canarias (Law 7/2003). Official State Gazette (in Spanish). 20 March 2003 [version as of 20 April 2007]. BOE-A-2003-7685.
- Decreto 44/2007, de 2 de abril, del Presidente de la Comunidad Autónoma de Canarias, por el que se convocan elecciones al Parlamento de Canarias (PDF) (Decree 44/2007). Official Gazette of the Canaries (in Spanish). 2 April 2007.
