= Astrid Pérez =

Spanish politician (born 1969)

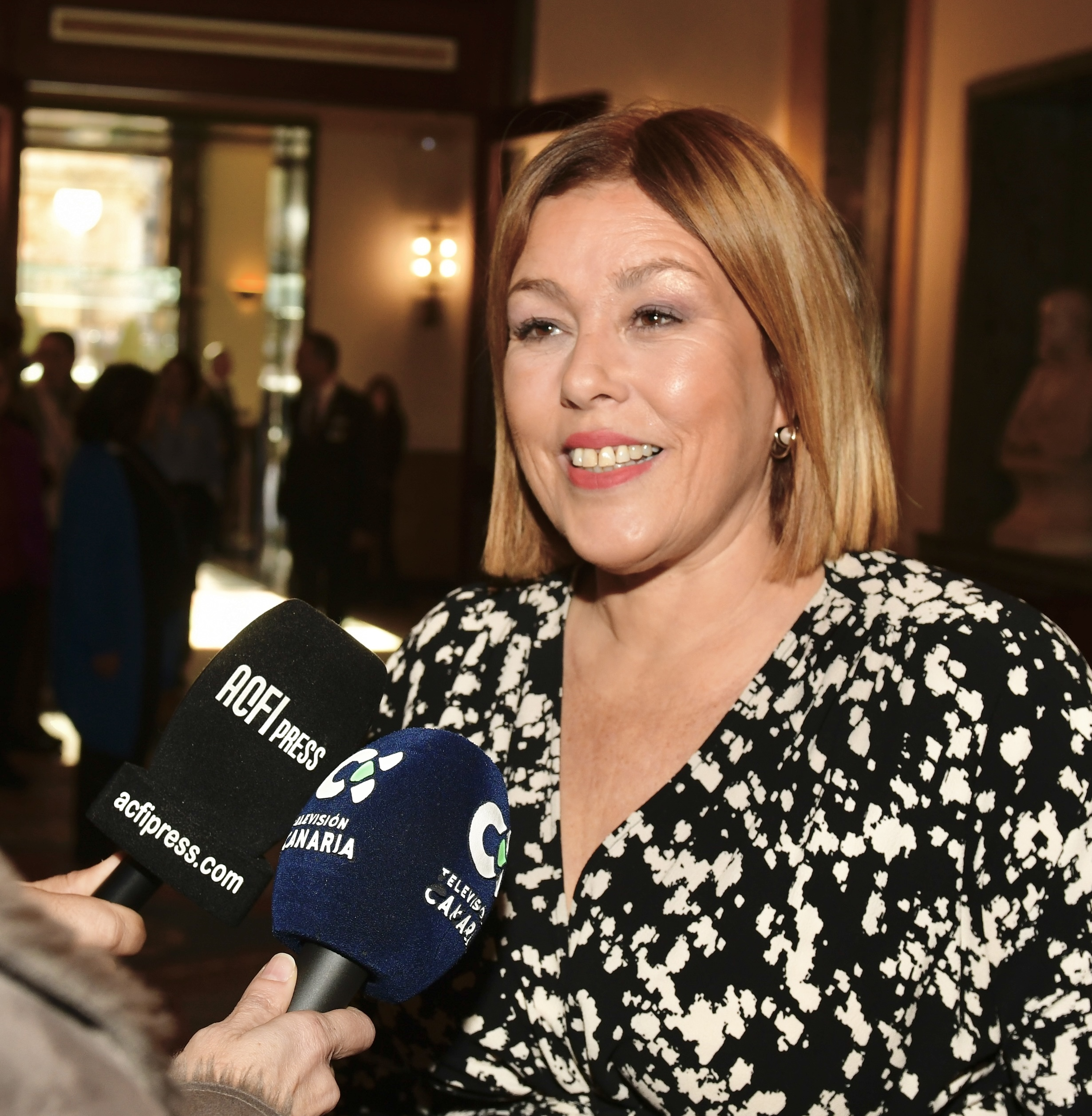
- Pérez in 2025

President of the Parliament of the Canary Islands
- Incumbent
- Assumed office 27 June 2023
- Preceded by: Gustavo Matos

Member of the Parliament of the Canary Islands
- Incumbent
- Assumed office 22 May 2011
- Constituency: Lanzarote

Mayor of Arrecife
- In office 15 June 2019 – 23 June 2023
- Preceded by: Eva de Anta
- Succeeded by: Yonathan de León

Personal details
- Born: 19 October 1969 (age 56) Las Palmas, Canary Islands, Spain
- Party: People's Party
- Children: 2
- Education: University of Granada
- Occupation: Lawyer • Politician

Astrid María Pérez Batista (born 19 October 1969) is a Spanish People's Party politician who is president of the Parliament of the Canary Islands since 2023. She was also mayor of Arrecife between 2019 and 2023 and a councilor of the Cabildo de Lanzarote, as well as a former managing director of Los Centros de Arte, Cultura y Turismo (CACT).

== Biography ==
Astrid María Pérez Batista was born on 19 October 1969 in Las Palmas. She was educated at the University of Granada (where she obtained her law degree) and the School of Legal Practice. She started practicing law in 1996, doing so until 2011, and she was managing director of the Los Centros de Arte, Cultura y Turismo (CACT) from 2009 until 2011. Her political career began when she was elected to Cabildo de Lanzarote, where she was first (2011) and second vice-president (2009-2011), as well as councillor for finance (2003-2005) and for tourism and the CACT (2011). She was elected president of the People's Party of Lanzarote on 29 November 2008.

Pérez was elected to the Parliament of the Canary Islands in the 2011 Canarian regional election for Lanzarote. She was subsequently re-elected to the same constituency in the 2015, 2019, and 2023 elections. In June 2023, she was elected president of the Parliament of the Canary Islands.

In 2019, she was elected mayor of the Arrecife City Council as part of a coalition between the PP, New Canaries and Spanish Socialist Workers' Party. She was re-elected in the 2023 Spanish local elections, as part of a coalition with the Canarian Coalition, but stepped down the same year.
