= Vicente Álvarez =

Vicente Álvarez may refer to:

- Vicente Álvarez Travieso (1705–1779), Spanish judge and politician
- Vicente Álvarez (general) (1862–1942), Filipino revolutionary general
- Vicente Álvarez Areces (1943–2013), Spanish politician
- Vicente Álvarez Pedreira (1933–2002), Spanish lawyer and politician
- Vicente Álvarez (footballer, born 1960), Spanish footballer
- Vicente Álvarez (footballer, born 2006), Chilean footballer

== See also ==
- Vicente Álvarez-Buylla (1890–1969), Spanish footballer, diplomat and writer
