= 2011 Canarian regional election =

Election in the Spanish region of the Canary Islands

- 22 May 2011

All 60 seats in the Parliament of the Canary Islands 31 seats needed for a majority
- Opinion polls
- Registered: 1,580,700 ▲1.5%
- Turnout: 931,010 (58.9%) ▼1.5 pp
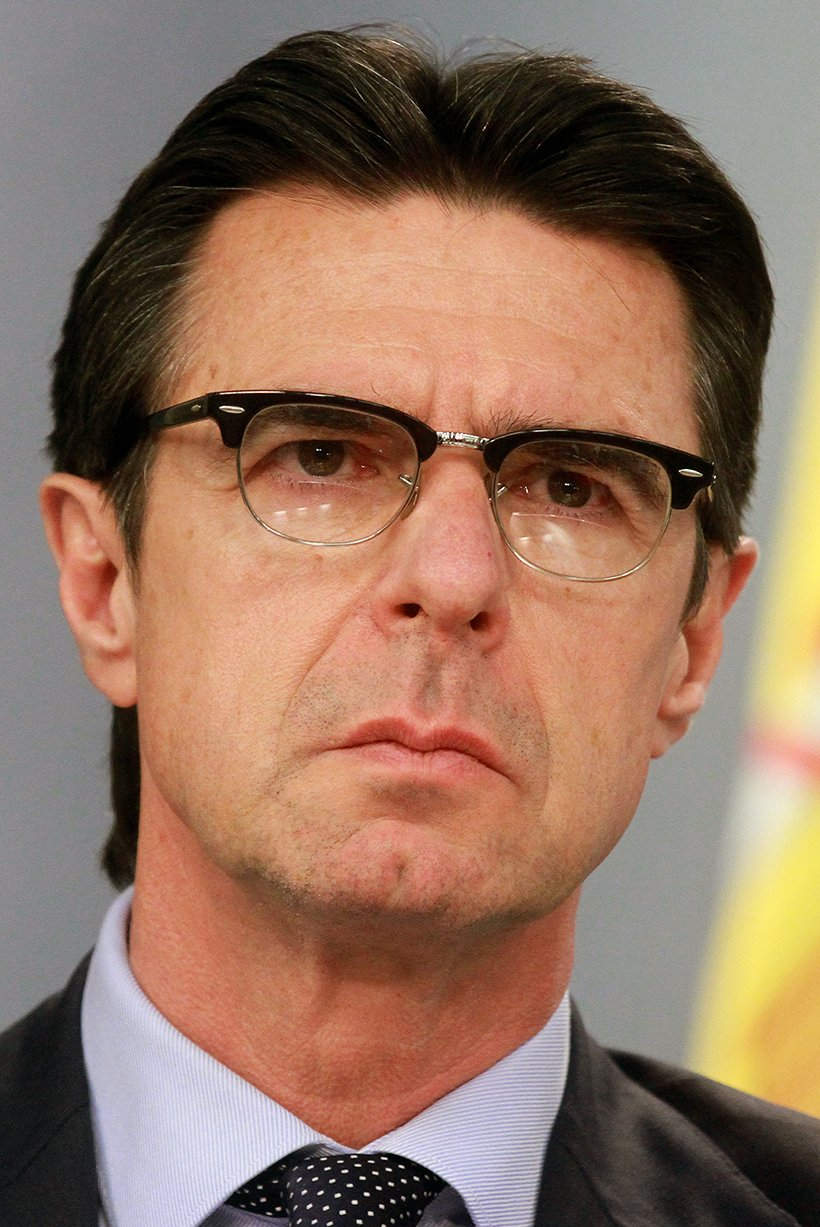

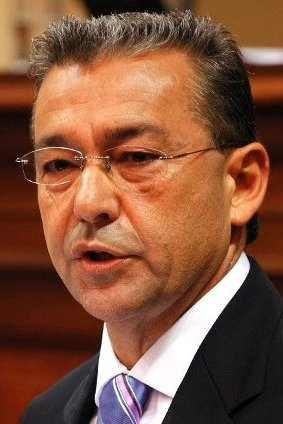

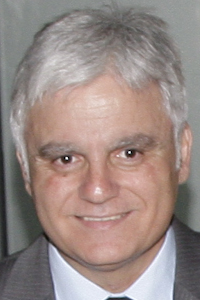

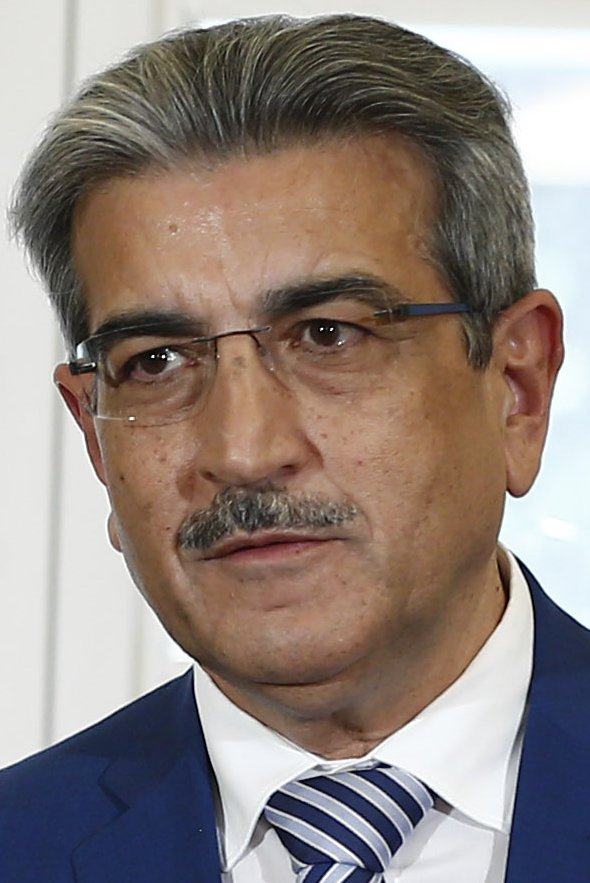
	First party	Second party	Third party
Leader	José Manuel Soria	Paulino Rivero	José Miguel Pérez García
Party	PP	CC–PNC–CCN	PSOE
Leader since	3 October 1999	3 February 2007	20 March 2010
Leader's seat	Gran Canaria	Tenerife	Gran Canaria
Last election	15 seats, 24.0%	19 seats, 28.1% (Note: Results for CC–PNC (24.1%, 19 seats) and CCN (4.0%, 0 seats)—not including Lanzarote—in the 2007 election.)	26 seats, 34.5%
Seats won	21	21	15
Seat change	▲6	▲2	▼11
Popular vote	289,381	225,948	190,028
Percentage	31.9%	24.9%	21.0%
Swing	▲7.9 pp	▼3.2 pp	▼13.5 pp
	Fourth party
Leader	Román Rodríguez
Party	NCa
Leader since	26 February 2005
Leader's seat	Gran Canaria
Last election	0 seats, 6.5% (Note: Results for NCa (5.4%, 0 seats) and PIL (1.0%, 0 seats) in the 2007 election.)
Seats won	3
Seat change	▲3
Popular vote	93,634
Percentage	9.1%
Swing	▲2.6 pp
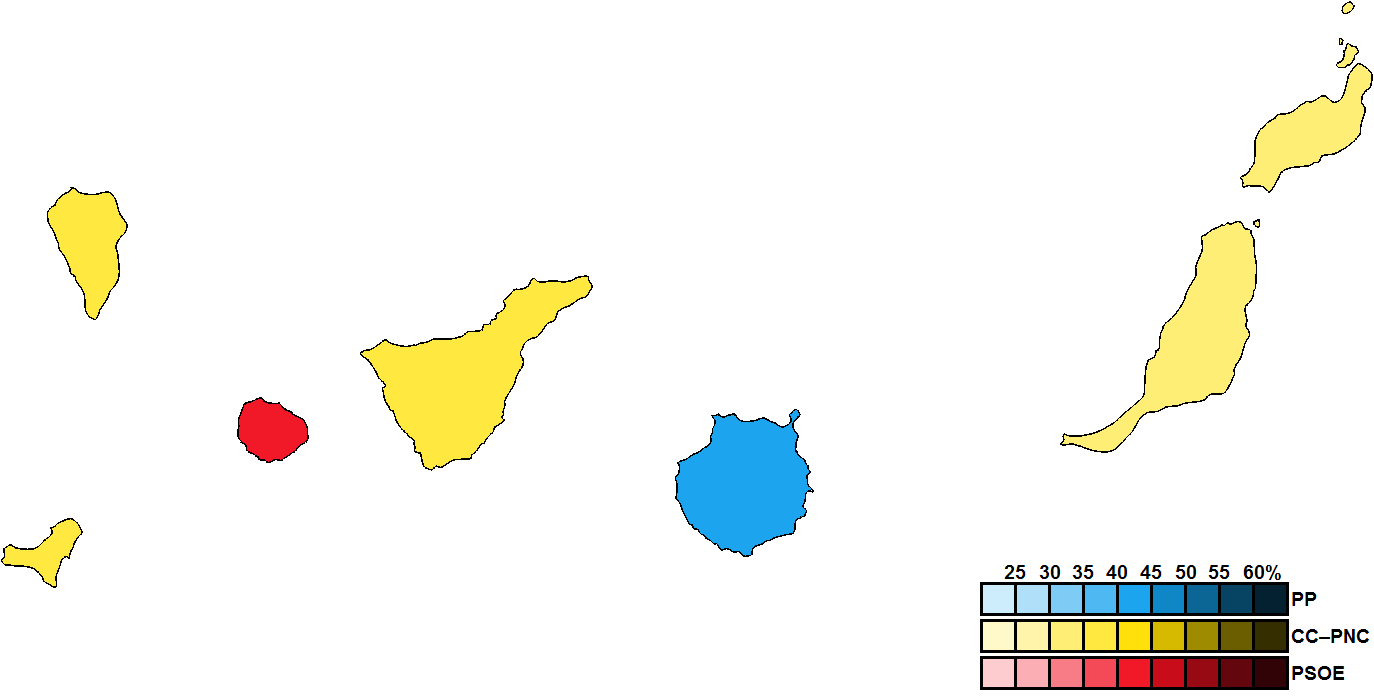
- Constituency results map for the Parliament of the Canary Islands
President before election
Paulino Rivero
CC
President after election
Paulino Rivero
CC

A regional election was held in the Canary Islands on 22 May 2011 to elect the 8th Parliament of the autonomous community. All 60 seats in the Parliament were up for election. It was held concurrently with regional elections in twelve other autonomous communities and local elections all across Spain.

== Overview ==
Under the 1982 Statute of Autonomy, the Parliament of the Canary Islands was the unicameral legislature of the homonymous autonomous community, having legislative power in devolved matters, as well as the ability to grant or withdraw confidence from a regional president. The electoral and procedural rules were supplemented by national law provisions.

=== Date ===
The term of the Parliament of the Canary Islands expired four years after the date of its previous ordinary election, with election day being fixed for the fourth Sunday of May every four years. The election decree was required to be issued no later than 54 days before the scheduled election date and published on the following day in the Official Gazette of the Canaries (BOC). The previous election was held on 27 May 2007, setting the date for election day on the fourth Sunday of May four years later, which was 22 May 2011.

The Parliament of the Canary Islands could not be dissolved before the expiration date of parliament, except in the event of an investiture process failing to elect a regional president within a two-month period from the first ballot. In such a case, the Parliament was to be automatically dissolved and a snap election called, with elected lawmakers serving the remainder of its original four-year term.

The election to the Parliament of the Canary Islands was officially called on 29 March 2011 with the publication of the corresponding decree in the BOC, setting election day for 22 May.

=== Electoral system ===
Voting for the Parliament was based on universal suffrage, comprising all Spanish nationals over 18 years of age, registered in the Canary Islands and with full political rights, provided that they had not been deprived of the right to vote by a final sentence, nor were legally incapacitated. Amendments earlier in 2011 required non-resident citizens to apply for voting, a system known as "begged" voting (Spanish: Voto rogado).

The Parliament of the Canary Islands had a minimum of 50 and a maximum of 70 seats, with electoral provisions fixing its size at 60. All were elected in seven multi-member constituencies—corresponding to the islands of El Hierro, Fuerteventura, Gran Canaria, La Gomera, La Palma, Lanzarote and Tenerife, each of which was assigned a fixed number of seats—using the D'Hondt method and closed-list proportional voting, with a 30 percent-threshold of valid votes (including blank ballots) in each constituency or six percent regionally.

As a result of the aforementioned allocation, each Parliament constituency was entitled the following seats:

Seats	Constituencies
15	Gran Canaria, Tenerife
8	La Palma, Lanzarote
7	Fuerteventura
4	La Gomera
3	El Hierro

The law did not provide for by-elections to fill vacant seats; instead, any vacancies arising after the proclamation of candidates and during the legislative term were filled by the next candidates on the party lists or, when required, by designated substitutes.

=== Outgoing parliament ===
The table below shows the composition of the parliamentary groups in the chamber at the time of the election call.

Parliamentary composition in March 2011
Groups	Parties	Legislators	
Groups	Parties	Seats	Total
Canarian Socialist Parliamentary Group	PSOE	26	26
Canarian Coalition Parliamentary Group (CC)	CC	17	19
Canarian Coalition Parliamentary Group (CC)	AHI	2	19
People's Parliamentary Group	PP	15	15

== Parties and candidates ==
The electoral law allowed for parties and federations registered in the interior ministry, alliances and groupings of electors to present lists of candidates. Parties and federations intending to form an alliance were required to inform the relevant electoral commission within 10 days of the election call, whereas groupings of electors needed to secure the signature of at least one percent of the electorate in the constituencies for which they sought election, disallowing electors from signing for more than one list. Additionally, a balanced composition of men and women was required in the electoral lists, so that candidates of either sex made up at least 40 percent of the total composition.

Below is a list of the main parties and alliances which contested the election:

Candidacy	Parties and alliances	Candidate	Ideology	Previous result		Gov.	Ref.
Candidacy	Parties and alliances	Candidate	Ideology	Vote %	Seats	Gov.	Ref.
PSOE	List: Spanish Socialist Workers' Party (PSOE)	José Miguel Pérez García	Social democracy	34.5%	26	No	
CC–PNC	List: Canarian Coalition (CC); Canarian Nationalist Party (PNC); Independent Herrenian Group (AHI); Canarian Centre (CCN)	Paulino Rivero	Regionalism; Canarian nationalism Centrism	28.1%	19	Yes	
PP	List: People's Party (PP)	José Manuel Soria	Conservatism; Christian democracy	24.0%	15	No	
NCa	List: New Canaries (NCa); Lanzarote Independents Party (PIL); Municipal Assemblies of Fuerteventura (AMF); New Fuerteventura (NF); Nationalist Party of Lanzarote (PNL); New Gran Canaria (NGC); Socialists for La Gomera (SxLG); New Gomera (NG); Socialists for Tenerife (SxTf); Initiative for La Palma (ILP)	Román Rodríguez	Canarian nationalism Social democracy	6.5%	0	No	

== Opinion polls ==
The tables below list opinion polling results in reverse chronological order, showing the most recent first and using the dates when the survey fieldwork was done, as opposed to the date of publication. Where the fieldwork dates are unknown, the date of publication is given instead. The highest percentage figure in each polling survey is displayed with its background shaded in the leading party's colour. If a tie ensues, this is applied to the figures with the highest percentages. The "Lead" column on the right shows the percentage-point difference between the parties with the highest percentages in a poll.

=== Voting intention estimates ===
The table below lists weighted voting intention estimates. Refusals are generally excluded from the party vote percentages, while question wording and the treatment of "don't know" responses and those not intending to vote may vary between polling organisations. When available, seat projections determined by the polling organisations are displayed below (or in place of) the percentages in a smaller font; 31 seats were required for an absolute majority in the Parliament of the Canary Islands.

Polling firm/Commissioner	Fieldwork date	Sample size	Turnout	PSOE	CC	PP	NCa	CCN	PIL	IUC	UPyD	Lead
2011 regional election	22 May 2011	—N/a	58.9	21.0; 15	24.9; 21	31.9; 21	9.1; 3	(Note: Within CC.)	(Note: Within NCa.)	0.8; 0	1.0; 0	7.0
Demométrica/ACN Press	2–12 May 2011	2,820	?	26.9; 17/19	25.8; 17/19	30.4; 16/19	11.6; 6			–	–	3.5
NC Report/La Razón (Note: "El PP doblega al PSOE a siete días de la cita electoral". La Razón (in Spanish). 15 May 2011. Archived from the original on 3 September 2011.)	3–10 May 2011	?	?	25.9; 17/18	27.5; 20/21	27.9; 19/20	? 2/3			–	–	0.4
Ikerfel/Vocento	9 May 2011	?	?	28.8; 19/21	25.7; 18/19	22.9; 15/16	12.9; 6			–	–	3.1
TNS Demoscopia/Antena 3	9 May 2011	1,500	?	26.7; 19/21	28.4; 18/20	27.7; 18/20	6.0; 0/3	–		–	–	0.7
Celeste-Tel/Terra	13–20 Apr 2011	700	?	23.2; 16	25.1; 20	30.3; 21	8.5; 2	–		–	–	5.2
OPMC Consultores	5–17 Apr 2011	2,400	?	27.7; 20/21	27.1; 19/21	30.6; 16/18	9.2; 3	–		–	–	2.9
CIS	17 Mar–17 Apr 2011	1,797	?	30.2; 23	23.9; 19/20	27.3; 16/17	5.1; 0/2	–		1.7; 0	0.8; 0	2.9
Sigma Dos/El Mundo	7–12 Apr 2011	1,200	?	27.3; 17/18	25.6; 17/22	33.6; 19/23	6.0; 1/3	–		–	–	6.3
Demométrica/ACN Press	22 Feb–17 Mar 2011	2,806	?	26.9; 17/19	24.6; 16/19	30.7; 17/19	11.0; 6	–		–	–	3.8
Sigma Dos/PP	15–18 Feb 2011	3,600	?	28.0; 16/21	25.7; 19/20	33.1; 20/24	–	–	–	–	–	5.1
Perfiles/Canarias7	1–9 Feb 2011	2,400	?	22.0– 23.0; 17	30.0– 31.0; 22/24	29.0– 30.0; 17/20	7.0– 8.0; 1/3	–		–	–	1.0
Sigma Dos/El Mundo	21–27 Dec 2010	1,200	?	27.6; 17/18	25.2; 18/22	37.0; 21/24	–	–	–	–	–	9.4
OPMC Consultores	12–24 Jul 2010	3,600	60.1	31.7; 23	20.5; 14	28.4; 14	(Note: Within CCN.)	15.8; 9		–	–	3.3
OPMC Consultores	12–24 Jul 2010	3,600	60.1	33.1; 23/25	22.7; 18/19	29.6; 15/16	6.7; 0/2	5.2; 0/2	0.8; 0	–	–	3.5
Sigma Dos/El Mundo	19–24 May 2010	1,200	?	30.7; 20/23	22.0; 14/17	35.3; 22/24	–	–	–	–	–	4.6
2009 EP election	7 Jun 2009	—N/a	39.2	36.0 (23)	15.8 (12)	40.8 (25)	–	–	–	1.6 (0)	1.2 (0)	4.8
KDK Creativa (Note: "PEV-2009 MAYO" (PDF). KDK Creativa (in Spanish). 1 June 2009. Archived from the original on 10 December 2010.)	1 Jun 2009	2,550	60.5	33.6; 22	23.1; 16/17	27.4; 14	9.8; 5/6	6.9; 1/3	0.8; 0	–	–	6.2
2008 general election	9 Mar 2008	—N/a	65.9	39.6 (27)	17.5 (10)	35.0 (23)	3.8 (0)			1.2 (0)	0.4 (0)	4.6
2007 regional election	27 May 2007	—N/a	60.4	34.5; 26	24.2; 19	24.0; 15	5.4; 0	4.0; 0	1.0; 0	0.7; 0	–	10.3

=== Voting preferences ===
The table below lists raw, unweighted voting preferences.

Polling firm/Commissioner	Fieldwork date	Sample size	PSOE	CC	PP	NCa	IUC	UPyD	Question	X mark	Lead
2011 regional election (Note: Does not include non-resident citizens.)	22 May 2011	—N/a	12.9	15.3	19.6	5.6	0.5	0.6	—N/a	36.8	4.3
CIS	17 Mar–17 Apr 2011	1,797	13.1	15.0	16.1	1.3	1.1	0.4	39.9	7.3	1.1
2009 EP election	7 Jun 2009	—N/a	14.6	6.4	16.7	–	0.6	0.5	—N/a	59.0	4.8
2008 general election	9 Mar 2008	—N/a	26.6	11.3	23.9	2.6	0.9	0.2	—N/a	32.4	2.7
2007 regional election	27 May 2007	—N/a	22.0	14.8	15.4	3.5	0.3	–	—N/a	36.2	6.6

=== Victory preferences ===
The table below lists opinion polling on the victory preferences for each party in the event of a regional election taking place.

Polling firm/Commissioner	Fieldwork date	Sample size	PSOE	CC	PP	NCa	IUC	UPyD	Other/ None	Question	Lead
CIS	17 Mar–17 Apr 2011	1,797	17.1	19.9	22.5	1.9	1.2	0.6	10.3	26.4	2.6

=== Victory likelihood ===
The table below lists opinion polling on the perceived likelihood of victory for each party in the event of a regional election taking place.

Polling firm/Commissioner	Fieldwork date	Sample size	PSOE	CC	PP	NCa	IUC	UPyD	Other/ None	Question	Lead
CIS	17 Mar–17 Apr 2011	1,797	8.4	29.1	30.2	0.5	0.1	0.0	2.6	29.2	1.1

=== Preferred President ===
The table below lists opinion polling on leader preferences to become president of the Canary Islands.

Polling firm/Commissioner	Fieldwork date	Sample size								Other/ None/ Not care	Question	Lead
Polling firm/Commissioner	Fieldwork date	Sample size	Pérez PSOE	Rivero CC	Soria PP	Rodríguez NCa	González CCN	Tamayo IUC	García UPyD	Other/ None/ Not care	Question	Lead
CIS	17 Mar–17 Apr 2011	1,797	9.2	27.4	18.4	–	–	0.9	0.3	13.6	30.1	9.0
Perfiles/Canarias7	1–9 Feb 2011	2,400	14.0	31.1	27.7	6.2	2.4	–	–	5.8	12.8	3.4

== Results ==
=== Overall ===
← Summary of the 22 May 2011 Parliament of the Canary Islands election results →
Parties and alliances	Popular vote			Seats	
Parties and alliances	Votes	%	±pp	Total	+/−
People's Party (PP)	289,381	31.94	+7.90	21	+6
Canarian Coalition–Nationalist Party–Canarian Centre (CC–PNC–CCN)^{1}	225,948	24.94	−3.16	21	+2
Spanish Socialist Workers' Party (PSOE)	190,028	20.98	−13.53	15	−11
New Canaries (NCa)^{2}	82,148	9.07	+2.60	3	+3
Yes We Can Citizens' Alternative (ACSSP)^{3}	19,020	2.10	+1.58	0	±0
The Greens (Verdes)	18,831	2.08	+0.18	0	±0
Union, Progress and Democracy (UPyD)	9,069	1.00	New	0	±0
Commitment to Gran Canaria (CGCa)	7,382	0.81	−0.10	0	±0
Canarian United Left (IUC)	6,818	0.75	+0.05	0	±0
Canarian Nationalist Alternative (ANC)	6,494	0.72	+0.45	0	±0
Common Sense in the Canaries (SCC)	4,761	0.53	New	0	±0
Majorero Progressive Party (PPMAJO)	4,334	0.48	New	0	±0
Canarian Patriotic Movement (MPC)	2,750	0.30	New	0	±0
Anti-Bullfighting Party Against Mistreatment of Animals (PACMA)	2,715	0.30	New	0	±0
Communist Party of the Canarian People (PCPC)	2,368	0.26	+0.12	0	±0
Party for Services and Public Employed (PSyEP)	1,993	0.22	New	0	±0
For a Fairer World (PUM+J)	1,442	0.16	New	0	±0
Movement for the Unity of the Canarian People (MUPC)	1,268	0.14	+0.05	0	±0
Humanist Party (PH)	1,246	0.14	+0.06	0	±0
Unity of the People (UP)	1,133	0.13	−0.03	0	±0
Liberal Democratic Centre (CDL)	1,018	0.11	New	0	±0
Canarian Social Democratic Centre (CSDC)	361	0.04	New	0	±0
National Democracy (DN)	314	0.03	±0.00	0	±0
Communist Unification of Spain (UCE)	120	0.01	New	0	±0
Blank ballots	25,017	2.76	+1.34		
Total	905,959			60	±0
Valid votes	905,959	97.31	−2.12		
Invalid votes	25,051	2.69	+2.12		
Votes cast / turnout	931,010	58.90	−1.54		
Abstentions	649,690	41.10	+1.54		
Registered voters	1,580,700				
Sources
Footnotes: ^{1} Canarian Coalition–Nationalist Party–Canarian Centre results are compared to the combined totals of Canarian Coalition–Canarian Nationalist Party and Canarian Centre in the 2007 election, not including Canarian Centre results in Lanzarote.; ^{2} New Canaries results are compared to the combined totals of New Canaries and Canarian Centre in Lanzarote in the 2007 election.; ^{3} Yes We Can Citizens' Alternative results are compared to Canarian Popular Alternative–25 May Citizens' Alternative totals in the 2007 election.

Popular vote
PP	31.94%
CC–PNC–CCN	24.94%
PSOE	20.98%
NCa	9.07%
ACSSP	2.10%
Verdes	2.08%
UPyD	1.00%
Others	5.13%
Blank ballots	2.76%

Seats
PP	35.00%
CC–PNC–CCN	35.00%
PSOE	25.00%
NCa	5.00%

=== Distribution by constituency ===
Constituency	PP		CC–PNC		PSOE		NCa	
Constituency	%	S	%	S	%	S	%	S
El Hierro	25.3	1	35.7	1	33.9	1		
Fuerteventura	20.4	2	33.7	3	17.3	2	8.6	−
Gran Canaria	41.4	8	9.2	1	21.1	4	14.3	2
La Gomera	24.7	1	20.9	1	44.9	2	4.2	−
La Palma	28.1	2	39.5	4	24.9	2	1.8	−
Lanzarote	22.4	2	34.8	4	17.2	1	13.6	1
Tenerife	25.6	5	36.6	7	20.2	3	4.7	−
Total	31.9	21	24.9	21	21.0	15	9.1	3

== Aftermath ==
=== Government formation ===
Investiture; Nomination of Paulino Rivero (CC)
Ballot →	5 July 2011
Required majority →	31 out of 60
Yes: • CC–PNC–CCN (21); • PSOE (15)	36 / 60
No: • PP (21)	21 / 60
Abstentions: • NCa (2); • PIL (1)	3 / 60
Absentees	0 / 60

== Bibliography ==
- Ley Orgánica 10/1982, de 10 de agosto, de Estatuto de Autonomía de Canarias (Organic Law 10/1982). Official State Gazette (in Spanish). 10 August 1982 [version as of 17 July 2010]. BOE-A-1982-20821.
- Ley Orgánica 5/1985, de 19 de junio, del Régimen Electoral General (Organic Law 5/1985). Official State Gazette (in Spanish). 19 June 1985 [version as of 30 April 2011]. BOE-A-1985-11672.
- Ley 7/2003, de 20 de marzo, de Elecciones al Parlamento de Canarias (Law 7/2003). Official State Gazette (in Spanish). 20 March 2003 [version as of 20 April 2007]. BOE-A-2003-7685.
- Decreto 43/2011, de 28 de marzo, del Presidente de la Comunidad Autónoma de Canarias, por el que se convocan elecciones al Parlamento de Canarias (Decree 43/2011). Official Gazette of the Canaries (in Spanish). 28 March 2011. BOC-A-2011-064-1576.
