= Manuel Hermoso =

Spanish politician (1935–2025)

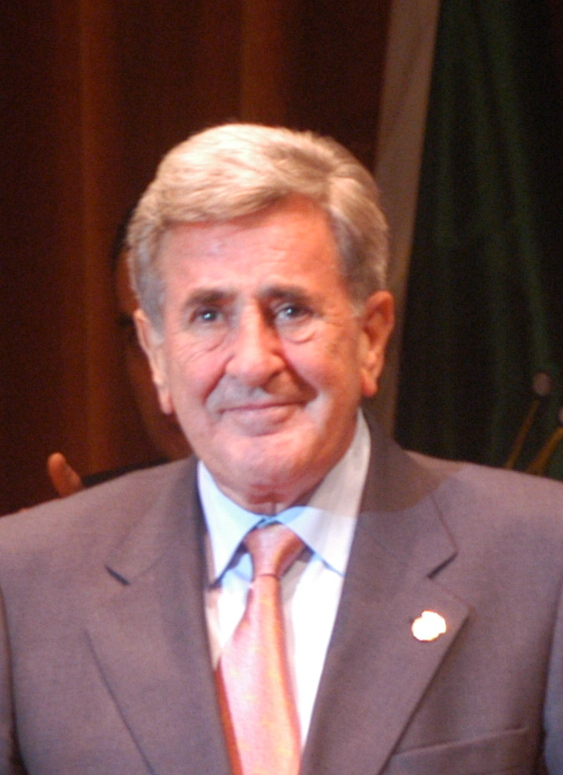
- Hermoso in 2004

President of the Canary Islands
- In office 6 April 1993 – 17 July 1999
- Preceded by: Jerónimo Saavedra
- Succeeded by: Román Rodríguez Rodríguez

Vice President of the Canary Islands
- In office 12 July 1991 – 2 April 1993
- President: Jerónimo Saavedra
- Preceded by: Vicente Álvarez Pedreira
- Succeeded by: José Mendoza Cabrera

Mayor of Santa Cruz de Tenerife
- In office 15 May 1979 – 15 June 1991
- Preceded by: Félix Álvaro Acuña
- Succeeded by: José Emilio García Gómez

Personal details
- Born: 24 July 1935 San Cristóbal de La Laguna, Spain
- Died: 17 June 2025 (aged 89)
- Party: Canarian Coalition

Manuel Antonio Hermoso Rojas (24 June 1935 – 17 June 2025) was a Canarian politician.

Hermoso was mayor of Santa Cruz de Tenerife from 1979 until 1991 and the fourth president of the Canary Islands Autonomous Region between 1993 and 1999. He represented the Canarian Coalition party and was the first politician ever to bring his party and himself into power in 1993. He was later succeeded after the elections by another Canarian Coalition politician Román Rodríguez Rodríguez in 1999.

== Early life ==
Hermoso was born on 24 June 1935 in San Cristóbal de La Laguna, which was then part of the Second Spanish Republic. His parents were Manuel Hermoso Banderas and Amparo Rojas Ortega, both of whom were from Cártama and intended to immigrate to the United States but stayed in Spain. When he was seven months old, his family moved to Santa Cruz de Tenerife. After completing his secondary education, he began studying industrial engineering in the hall of Colegio Mayor Santa María de Europa at the Complutense University of Madrid, where he was roommates with future Minister of the Interior Rodolfo Martín Villa. After graduating with his bachelor's degree he chose to work in several companies in Bilbao and Galicia as there were not many opportunities in the Canary Islands at the time. After his father's health worsened, he returned to the Canary Islands and directed his father's furniture company on Rambla Pulido.

== Political career ==
During the early 1970s he became a promoter of the Tenerife Group of Independents, which became integrated into the Canary Islands Coalition. He then served as mayor of Santa Cruz de Tenerife between 1979 and 1991. He was also elected a member of the Congress of Deputies in 1986.

== Death ==
Hermoso died on 17 June 2025, at the age of 89.

Preceded by Jerónimo Saavedra	President of the Canary Islands; 1993–1999	Succeeded by Román Rodríguez Rodríguez
