= Alfonso Soriano Benítez de Lugo =

Spanish jurist, civil servant and politician

First mayor of Canary Islands

Personal details
- Born: October 2, 1936 (age 89) San Cristóbal de La Laguna, Tenerife, Spain
- Citizenship: Spain
- Other political affiliations: People's Party of Spain Democratic Center Union Alianza Popular
- Education: University of Madrid and University of La Laguna

Alfonso Soriano Benítez de Lugo (born October 2, 1936) is a Spanish jurist, civil servant, and politician, five times a member of Congress, as well as a senator and first president of the pre-autonomous entity Junta de Canarias.

== Biography ==
He graduated in law from the University of Madrid, and after studying at the University of La Laguna, he expanded and completed studies at the School of Industrial Organization (EOI) and at the current National Institute of Public Administration, where he later became a professor. He entered public service by opposition within the technical body of the State Civil Administration in the 1960s. He held various responsibilities as a public official during the Franco dictatorship, where he was deputy director general in the personnel area of two ministries: education and housing and the Presidency of the Government.

In the political sphere, during the Transition, he joined the Democratic Center Union (UCD), a formation with which he was elected deputy in 1977 for the Tenerife constituency in the first free elections after the dictatorship, participating in the constituent process. In the next electoral call in 1979, he was elected senator, also for Tenerife. He was part of the Assembly of Parliamentarians that addressed the implementation of the autonomous process for the Canary Islands and began the preparation of what would later become the autonomous statute of the islands. In this process, Alfonso Soriano was the first president of the pre-autonomous governing body, the Junta de Canarias, between 1978 and 1979. He was replaced in office by his UCD colleague, Fernando Bergasa Perdomo.

After the disintegration of UCD following the party's severe defeat in the 1982 elections, Alfonso Soriano joined the Popular Party, a party with which he was again elected deputy to Congress in 1989, 1993, 1996, and 2000.

After leaving Congress in 2004, he was a councilor of the Santa Cruz de Tenerife City Council until 2011, being critical of his political formation, both in relation to the city government and in the management of the Tenerife leadership itself.

The Tenerife City Council awarded him distinctions and honors in 2012 for his work as the first president of the Canary Islands.
