= Adán Martín =

Spanish politician (1943–2010)

Adán Martín Menis
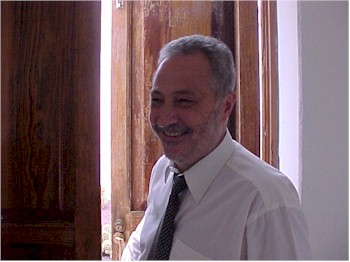

7th President of the Canary Islands
- In office 4 July 2003 – 13 July 2007
- Preceded by: Román Rodríguez Rodríguez
- Succeeded by: Paulino Rivero

Personal details
- Born: 19 October 1943 Santa Cruz de Tenerife, Canary Islands
- Died: 10 October 2010 (aged 66) Barcelona, Spain
- Party: Canarian Coalition (CC)
- Spouse: Pilar Parejo
- Occupation: Industrial engineer

Adán Martín Menis (19 October 1943 – 10 October 2010) was president of the Canary Islands (Spain) from July 2003 until 2007.

Menis was born in Santa Cruz de Tenerife. He was an industrial engineer and represented the Canarian Coalition party.

== Life and career ==
He served as mayor of Santa Cruz de Tenerife from 1979 to 1987, the minister of public works in the island council of Tenerife from 1982 to 1986, a national deputy from 1993 to 1996, vice-president of the Canary Islands and president of the island of Tenerife from 1987 to 1999.

Menis was elected president in the autonomous elections of 2003.

== Death ==
He died in Barcelona. His funeral was held on October 11, with a funeral procession from the chapel in the Government Building of the Canary Islands to the Church of the Conception of Santa Cruz de Tenerife. There Mass was celebrated by the Bishop of the Diocese of Tenerife, Bernardo Álvarez Afonso, and mass was attended by other civil authorities. From the Iglesia de la Concepción the coffin left for Santa Lastenia Cemetery. Adán Martín was the first regional president of Spain to die in times of democracy.

In 2011, the Auditorio de Tenerife, it was renamed to Auditorio de Tenerife "Adán Martín", as a tribute for having promoted its construction. But despite this, the building is still better known by its original name.

Political offices
Preceded by Román Rodríguez Rodríguez	President of the Canary Islands; 2003–2007	Succeeded by Paulino Rivero
