= Fernando Clavijo (politician) =

President of the Canary Islands (2015–2019; since 2023)

The Most Excellent Fernando Clavijo
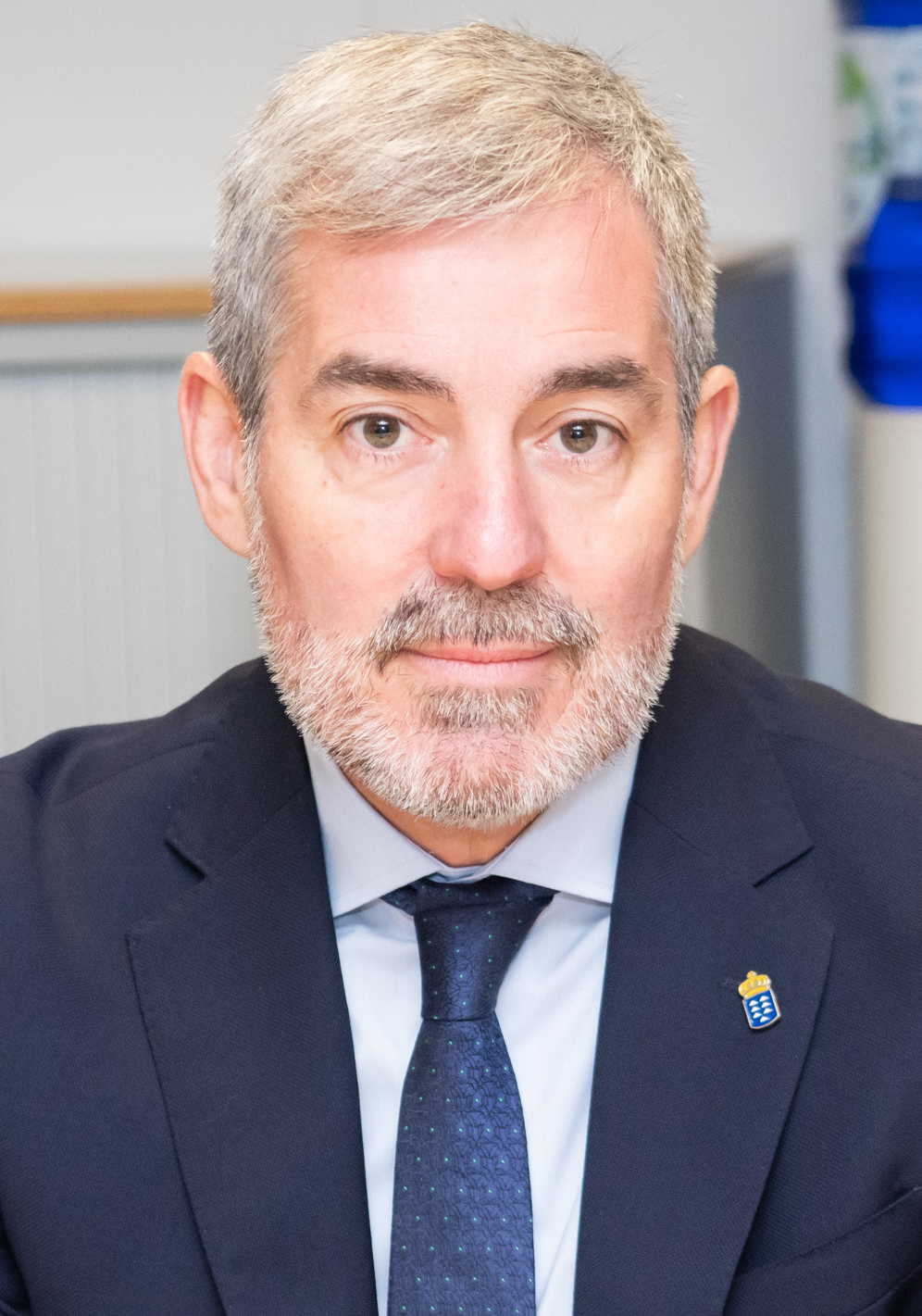
- Clavijo in 2023

President of the Canary Islands
- Incumbent
- Assumed office 14 July 2023
- Preceded by: Ángel Víctor Torres
- In office 9 July 2015 – 16 July 2019
- Preceded by: Paulino Rivero
- Succeeded by: Ángel Víctor Torres

Personal details
- Born: Fernando Clavijo Batlle; 10 August 1971 (age 54) El Sauzal, Tenerife, Spain
- Party: Canarian Coalition

Fernando Clavijo Batlle (born 10 August 1971) is a Spanish politician who has served as the president of the Canary Islands since 2023. A member of the Canarian Coalition, he previously served as president from 2015 to 2019.

== Career ==
He studied economics and business at the University of La Laguna, working in the private sector at the same time. He then became an advisor to the musical activities organization of San Cristóbal de La Laguna.

He joined the Tenerife Independents Group (ATI) in 1992. He became general secretary of the ATI Youth of San Cristóbal de La Laguna in 1997, and became head of the youth organization in 2001.

He resigned from all his functions in 2003, following his election to the municipal council of San Cristóbal de La Laguna, where he was municipal councilor delegated to Security. After the elections of May 27, 2007, Mayor Ana Oramas appointed him, at the age of 35, first deputy, delegated to Urban Planning.

Following the election of Oramas to the Congress of Deputies, Fernando Clavijo was sworn in as Mayor of San Cristóbal de La Laguna on 21 November 2008, with the Canarian Coalition having 15 out of 27 elected representatives. A candidate for his own succession in the election of 22 May 2011, he only won 13 seats. However, he began a second term, due to the Spanish Socialist Workers' Party (PSOE).

=== President of the Canary Islands ===
On 12 September 2014, he ran for the Canarian Coalition's presidential nomination for the 2015 Canarian regional election, against the incumbent Paulino Rivero. In the first round, he received 45 votes, compared to the 55 needed and 40 for Rivero. Rivero then decided to withdraw before the second round, and Clavijo obtained the nomination by 66 votes out of 92. The Canarian Coalition won 18 seats in the election; after receiving the support of the PSOE and Gomera Socialist Group (ASG), the alliance formed a majority and Clavijo was elected president in July 2015 with 36 votes in favour and 23 against.

Clavijo returned to office following the 2023 regional election held on 28 May 2023. The Canarian Coalition formed a governing alliance with the People’s Party (PP) and smaller regional parties, including the Independent Herrenian Group (AHI) and ASG, which together secured a parliamentary majority in the 70-seat Parliament of the Canary Islands.

On 6 May 2026, while serving as the President of the Canary Islands, he opposed a hantavirus-stricken cruise ship, MV Hondius, from docking in the Canary Islands.
