= Vicente Álvarez Pedreira =

Spanish lawyer and politician

Vicente Álvarez Pedreira (1933 Santa Cruz de Tenerife - August 19, 2002) was a Spanish lawyer and politician belonging to the Unión de Centro Democrático (UCD) party. He was president of the Junta de Canarias between June 9, 1980, and June 12, 1981. In addition, he also assumed the positions of Magistrate of the Superior Court of Justice of the Canary Islands, former senator for the island of Tenerife, former deputy of Parliament of the Canary Islands, former vice president of the Board of the Parliament of the Canary Islands, former vice president of the Government of the Canary Islands, and Counselor of the Presidency.

In 2014, the Santa Cruz de Tenerife City Council labeled a street with his name in the Cabo-Llanos neighborhood.
