= Fernando Fernández Martín =

Spanish politician

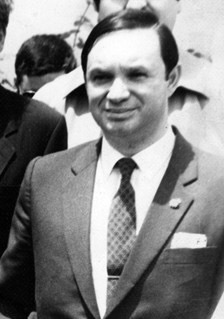
Fernando-Fernandez

Fernando Fernández Martín (born 29 May 1943 in Santa Cruz de La Palma, Tenerife) is a Spanish politician who was the president of the Canary Islands between 1987 and 1988. He is now a Member of the European Parliament with the People's Party, part of the European People's Party, and sits on the European Parliament's Committee on Development.

He is a substitute member of the Committee on Regional Development, a vice-chair of the Delegation for relations with the countries of the Andean Community and a substitute member for the Delegation to the ACP-EU Joint Parliamentary Assembly.

== Education ==
- 1965: Graduate in medicine and surgery (Navarre)
- 1966: Diploma in Neurology (Barcelona)
- 1967: Paris
- 1968: Specialist in clinical neurophysiology and neurology (Navarre)
- 1975: Doctor of medicine

== Career ==
- 1965-1968: Assistant lecturer in neurology (Navarre)
- 1969-1979: Senior lecturer in medical pathology (La Laguna)
- 1984: Deputy professor in neurology (La Laguna)
- 1971-1999: Head of the Neurology Department at the University Hospital of the Canary Islands
- 1994-1999: Member of the PP Regional Executive Committee (Canary Islands, 1991–2004) and of the PP National Executive Committee
- 1983-1994: Member of the Canary Islands Regional Parliament
- 1983-1989: Regional President of the Social Democratic Centre party (CDS) in the Canary Islands
- 1991-1994: Chairman of the PP parliamentary group
- 1987-1990: President of the Autonomous Government of the Canary Islands
- since 1994: Member of the European Parliament
- 1999-2001: Vice-Chairman of the Committee on Development
- 1994-2004: Member of the ACP-EU Joint Parliamentary Assembly
- 2001-2004: Vice-Chairman of the Delegation for relations with the countries of South America and Mercosur
- 2004: Chairman of the ad hoc delegations for Venezuela (2003) and for Bolivia
- Member of election observation missions for various electoral processes in Africa and Latin America

== Decorations ==
- Chain of the Order of the Canary Islands
- Medal of the Spanish Senate and other national and foreign decorations

== See also ==
- 2004 European Parliament election in Spain
