= Román Rodríguez (politician) =

Canarian politician

Román Rodríguez Rodríguez (born 1 March 1956) is a Canarian politician who was the president of the Canary Islands between 1999 and 2003. He was licensed in medicine at the University of La Laguna. He worked as a medical assistant for one year and as a university professor.

During the 1980s, he took part in antimilitarist and social movements. In 1991, he joined Iniciativa Canaria (ICAN), an organization which in 1993 merged with the Canarian Coalition (CC).

He was director general of the Sanitary Assistance between 1993 and 1995. In 1995, he was elected as general director of the Canarian Health Service.

In the 2004 general election, he represented the Canarian Coalition.

In 2004, as the internal tensions within the Canarian Coalition became more evident, Román Rodríguez Rodríguez headed a faction critical of the coalition, forming a new political group called Nueva Canarias. Nevertheless, in the Spanish Congress of Deputies, he continues to sit as a member of the parliamentary group of the Canarian Coalition.

Since 18 July 2019 is the Vicepresident of Canary Islands as newly elected President Ángel Víctor Torres appointed him for a progressist coalition government.

Preceded by Manuel Antonio Hermoso Rojas	President of the Canary Islands; 1999—2003	Succeeded by Adán Martín Menis
