= Canarian Coalition =

Canarian Coalition Coalición Canaria
- Abbreviation: CC; CCa
- General Secretary: Fernando Clavijo Batlle
- Founded: February 1993 (as a coalition); May 2005 (as a party)
- Headquarters: C/ Galcerán, 7-9 Edif. El Drago, Santa Cruz de Tenerife; C/ Buenos Aires 24, Las Palmas de Gran Canaria
- Ideology: Canarian nationalism Regionalism Centrism
- Political position: Centre to centre-right
- National affiliation: CEUS (since 2019) (Note: The party was formerly part of the CEU (2014–2019), CEU (2009–2014), CE (1999–2004) and CN (1994–1999).)
- Regional affiliation: Agreement of Nationalist Unity (2006–2023)
- European affiliation: European Democratic Party
- Colours: White, blue, yellow (colours of the Canarian flag)
- Congress of Deputies (Canarian seats): 1 / 15
- Spanish Senate (Canarian seats): 1 / 14
- European Parliament: 0 / 61
- Canarian Parliament: 20 / 70
- Island councils: 41 / 155
- Mayors (2023-2027): 21 / 88
- Municipal councils (2023-2027): 303 / 1,402

Website
- coalicioncanaria.org

The Canarian Coalition (Spanish: Coalición Canaria, CC or CCa) is a regionalist and Canarian nationalist political party in Spain operating in the Canary Islands. The party's aim is for greater autonomy for the islands but not independence. Its position has been labeled as centrist and centre-right. The party governed the Canary Islands from 1993 to 2019; and currently since 2023 under Fernando Clavijo's leadership.

It usually negotiates with the plurality party at the Cortes to form a majority in exchange for resources for the islands. It also governs the local administrations of Tenerife, La Palma, and Fuerteventura, as well as having majority control in some of the town councils on the Canary Islands.

== History ==
The coalition was formed in February 1993 from a grouping of five parties (the largest being the Canarian Independent Groups) under one banner and has governed the Canary Islands since 1993, when it replaced the former Spanish Socialist Workers' Party (PSOE) administration after a motion of no confidence. After entering government, CC obtained power for the regional government to levy its own taxes and a law compensating the islands for their distance from the mainland. The coalition became a single party in 2005.

== Composition ==
Party	Scope	Notes
Independent Canarian Centre (CCI)	Canaries	Left in 2005
Nationalist Canarian Initiative (ICAN)	Canaries	Dissolved in 1993
Canarian Nationalist Party (PNC)	Canaries	Left in 2023
Canarian Independent Groups (AIC)	Canaries	Dissolved in 1993
Tenerife Group of Independents (ATI)	Tenerife	Dissolved in 2005
La Palma Group of Independents (API)	La Palma	Dissolved in 2005
Lanzarote Independents Party (PIL)	Lanzarote	Left in 1994.
Independents of Fuerteventura (IF)	Fuerteventura	Left in 1994.
Majorera Assembly (AM)	Fuerteventura	Dissolved in 1995
Independent Herrenian Group (AHI)	El Hierro	Left in 2023

== Electoral performance ==
=== Parliament of the Canary Islands ===
Election	Leading candidate	Island constituencies		Regional constituency		Seats	+/–	Government
Election	Leading candidate	Votes	%	Votes	%	Seats	+/–	Government
1995	Manuel Hermoso	261,424	32.80 (#1)			21 / 60	4 (Note: Compared to the combined totals of Canarian Independent Groups in La Palma and Tenerife, Canarian Initiative and Majorera Assembly in the 1991 regional election.)	Minority (1995–1996)
1995	Manuel Hermoso	261,424	32.80 (#1)			21 / 60	4	Coalition (1996–1999)
1999	Román Rodríguez	306,658	36.93 (#1)			24 / 60	3	Coalition (1999–2002)
1999	Román Rodríguez	306,658	36.93 (#1)			24 / 60	3	Minority (2002–2003)
2003	Adán Martín	304,413	32.90 (#1)			23 / 60	1	Coalition (2003–2005)
2003	Adán Martín	304,413	32.90 (#1)			23 / 60	1	Minority (2005–2007)
2007	Paulino Rivero	Within CC–PNC				17 / 60	4	Coalition (2007–2010)
2007	Paulino Rivero	Within CC–PNC				17 / 60	4	Minority (2010–2011)
2011	Paulino Rivero	Within CC–PNC–CCN				18 / 60	2	Coalition
2015	Fernando Clavijo	Within CC–PNC				16 / 60	3	Coalition (2015–2016)
2015	Fernando Clavijo	Within CC–PNC				16 / 60	3	Minority (2016–2019)
2019	Fernando Clavijo	Within CC–PNC				19 / 70	2	Opposition
2023	Fernando Clavijo	201,401	22.08 (#2)	175,198	19.20 (#3)	19 / 70	0	Coalition

=== Cortes Generales ===
View source data.
- Figures from 2008 to November 2019 correspond to the Agreement of Nationalist Unity.

Cortes Generales
Election	Congress					Senate		Leader	Status in legislature
Election	Vote	%	Score	Seats	+/–	Seats	+/–	Leader	Status in legislature
1993	207,077	0.88%	7th	4 / 350	3 (Note: Compared to Canarian Independent Groups totals in the 1989 general election.)	5 / 208	1 (Note: Compared to the combined totals of Canarian Independent Groups, Majorera Assembly and Independent Herrenian Group in the 1989 general election.)	Lorenzo Olarte	Opposition
1996	220,418	0.88%	6th	4 / 350	0	1 / 208	4	José Carlos Mauricio	Confidence and supply
2000	248,261	1.07%	7th	4 / 350	0	5 / 208	4	José Carlos Mauricio	Opposition
2004	235,221	0.91%	7th	3 / 350	1	3 / 208	2	Paulino Rivero	Opposition
2008	Within CC–PNC			2 / 350	1	0 / 208	3	Ana Oramas	Opposition
2011	Within CC–NC–PNC			2 / 350	0	0 / 208	0	Ana Oramas	Opposition
2015	Within CC–PNC			1 / 350	1	0 / 208	0	Ana Oramas	Opposition
2016	Within CC–PNC			1 / 350	0	0 / 208	0	Ana Oramas	Opposition
2019 (Apr)	Within CC–PNC			2 / 350	1	0 / 208	0	Ana Oramas	Opposition
2019 (Nov)	Within CC–NC–PNC			2 / 350	0	0 / 208	0	Ana Oramas	Opposition
2023	116,363	0.47%	11th	1 / 350	1	0 / 208	0	Cristina Valido García	Confidence and supply

View source data.
- Figures from 2008 to November 2019 correspond to the Agreement of Nationalist Unity.

Election	Canary Islands						
Election	Congress					Senate	
Election	Vote	%	Score	Seats	+/–	Seats	+/–
1993	207,077	25.58%	3rd	4 / 14	3	5 / 11	1
1996	220,418	25.09%	3rd	4 / 14	0	1 / 11	4
2000	248,261	29.56%	2nd	4 / 14	0	5 / 11	4
2004	235,221	24.33%	3rd	3 / 15	1	3 / 11	2
2008	Within CC–PNC			2 / 15	1	0 / 11	3
2011	Within CC–NC–PNC			2 / 15	0	0 / 11	0
2015	Within CC–PNC			1 / 15	1	0 / 11	0
2016	Within CC–PNC			1 / 15	0	0 / 11	0
2019 (Apr)	Within CC–PNC			2 / 15	1	0 / 11	0
2019 (Nov)	Within CC–NC–PNC			2 / 15	0	0 / 11	0
2023	114,718	11.28%	3rd	1 / 15	1	0 / 11	0

=== European Parliament ===
European Parliament
Election	Spain		Canary Islands		EP Group
Election	Vote	Seats	Vote	%	EP Group
1994	with CN	1 / 64	113,677 (#3)	18.85	ERA
1999	with CE	1 / 64	276,186 (#1)	33.78	ELDR
2004	with CE	0 / 54	90,619 (#3)	16.92	–
2009	with CEU	0 / 54	96,297 (#3)	15.84	–
2014	with CEU	0 / 54	69,601 (#3)	12.18	–
2019	with CEUS	0 / 59	184,936 (#2)	20.75	–
2024	with CEUS	0 / 61	70,008 (#4)	10.29	–
