= Paulino Rivero =

Spanish politician and teacher

The Most Excellent Paulino Rivero
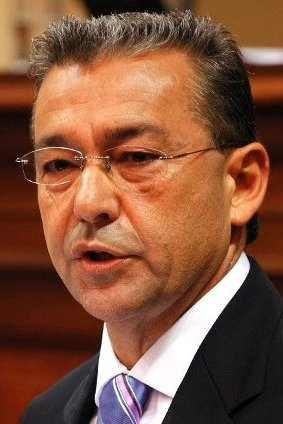

8th President of the Canary Islands
- In office 13 July 2007 – 9 July 2015
- Preceded by: Adán Martín Menis
- Succeeded by: Fernando Clavijo Batlle

Personal details
- Born: 11 February 1952 (age 74) El Sauzal, Tenerife, Spain
- Party: Canarian Coalition

Paulino Rivero Baute (born 11 February 1952 in El Sauzal, Tenerife, Spain) is a Spanish politician and teacher. A member of the Canarian Coalition, he is the former president of the autonomous community of the Canary Islands.

== Biography ==
Prior to his career in politics, Rivero was a primary school teacher; he received his diploma from the University of La Laguna. In the 1979 regional elections, the first such elections under the Spanish Constitution of 1978, Rivero was elected as the mayor of El Sauzal, a position he held until 1997. Rivero initially represented the Union of the Democratic Centre, but in 1983 he switched to the Agrupación Tinerfeña de Independientes, a group that eventually formed part of the Canarian Coalition.

Rivero was also a member of the Cabildo de Tenerife before moving into national politics in 1996. At the 1996 general election, Rivero was elected to the Congress of Deputies as the representative of the Santa Cruz de Tenerife electoral district - he was subsequently re-elected at the 2000 and 2004 general elections. He chaired the parliamentary committee investigating the 2004 Madrid train bombings.

In February 2007, Rivero was selected as the Canarian Coalition's candidate for President of the Canary Islands at the 2007 regional elections. The coalition received the third-highest share of the vote, 23.36%, but received the second highest number of delegates with 19. Rivero's party formed a coalition with the third-place People's Party, which allowed him to be installed as President on 13 July 2007.
