= Víctor González =

Víctor González (or Victor Gonzalez) may refer to:

== Arts and entertainment ==
- Victor Antonio González (born 1963), American television host
- Víctor González (actor) (born 1973), Mexican actor
- Victor Gonzalez (director), American television director

== Law and politics ==
- Víctor González Fuentes (fl. 1978), President of Bolivia
- Víctor González Torres (born 1947), Mexican businessman and politician
- Víctor González Manríquez (born 1959), Mexican politician
- Víctor Ernesto González Huerta (born 1964), Mexican politician
- Víctor Manuel González Reyes (born 1965), Mexican politician
- Victor González (politician, born 1975), Spanish businessman and politician
- Víctor González (politician, born 1987), Spanish politician

== Sports ==
- Víctor González (cyclist) (born 1957), Uruguayan cyclist
- Víctor Hugo González (born 1974), Colombian cyclist
- Victor Gonzalez Jr. (born 1975), Puerto Rican racing driver
- Víctor González (footballer, born 1977), Chilean football player and manager
- Víctor González (footballer, born 1994), Chilean footballer
- Victor González (baseball) (born 1995), Mexican baseball player
