= Jaime López =

Jaime López may refer to:

- Jaime López (painter) (fl. 15th century), Spanish painter
- Jaime López (pentathlete) (born 1986), Spanish modern pentathlete
- Jaime López (songwriter) (born 1954), Mexican songwriter
- Jaime Chris López (born 1979), Mexican politician
