= Government of Ángel Víctor Torres =

- Government of the Canary Islands
- 2019–2023
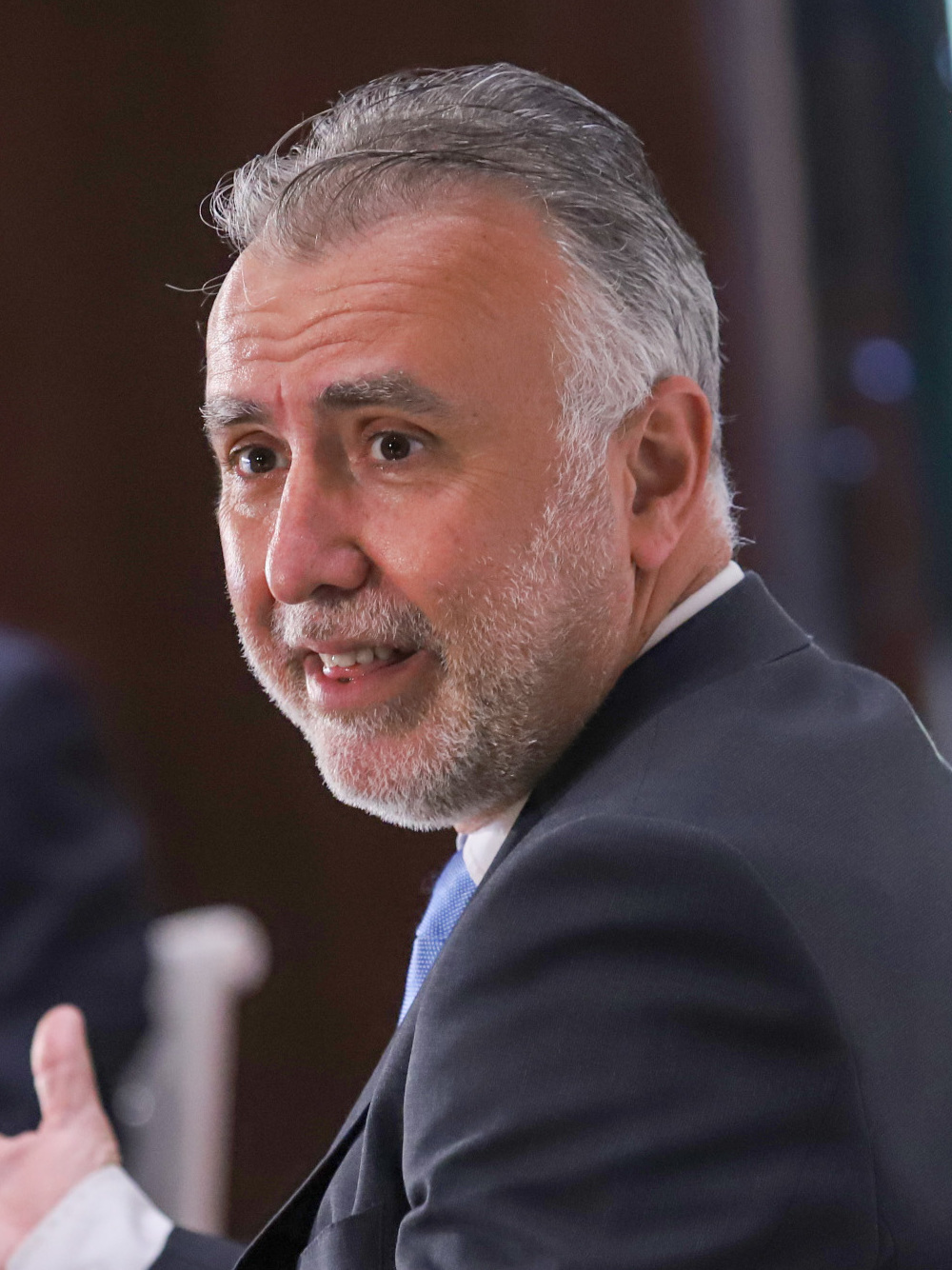
- Ángel Víctor Torres in July 2021.
- Date formed: 18 July 2019
- Date dissolved: 15 July 2023

People and organisations
- Monarch: Felipe VI
- President: Ángel Víctor Torres
- Vice President: Román Rodríguez
- No. of ministers: 11
- Total no. of members: 11
- Member party: PSOE; NCa; Podemos; ASG
- Status in legislature: Majority coalition government
- Opposition party: CCa–PNC
- Opposition leader: Fernando Clavijo

History
- Election: 2019 regional election
- Outgoing election: 2023 regional election
- Legislature term: 10th Parliament
- Budget: 2020, 2021, 2022, 2023
- Predecessor: Clavijo I
- Successor: Clavijo II

The Torres government was a regional government of the Canary Islands led by President Ángel Víctor Torres. It was formed in July 2019 after the regional election.

== Investiture ==
Investiture; Ángel Víctor Torres (PSOE)
Ballot →	12 July 2019
Required majority →	36 out of 70
Yes: • PSOE (25); • NCa (5); • Podemos–SSP–Equo (4); • ASG (3)	37 / 70
No: • CCa–PNC (20); • PP (11); • Cs (2)	33 / 70
Abstentions	0 / 70
Absentees	0 / 70

== Government ==
Name	Portrait	Party	Office	Took office	Left office	^{Refs.}
Ángel Víctor Torres		Socialist Party of the Canaries	President	16 July 2019	14 July 2023	
Román Rodríguez		New Canaries	Vice President	18 July 2019	15 July 2023	
Román Rodríguez		New Canaries	Minister of Finance, Budgets and European Affairs	18 July 2019	15 July 2023	
Yaiza Castilla		Gomera Socialist Group	Minister of Tourism, Industry and Commerce	18 July 2019	15 July 2023	
María Teresa Cruz		Socialist Party of the Canaries	Minister of Health	18 July 2019	15 July 2023	
Carolina Darias		Socialist Party of the Canaries	Minister of Economy, Knowledge and Employment	18 July 2019	15 July 2023	
Sebastián Franquis		Socialist Party of the Canaries	Minister of Public Works, Transportation and Housing	18 July 2019	15 July 2023	
María José Guerra		Independent	Minister of Education, Universities, Culture and Sports	18 July 2019	15 July 2023	
Julio Manuel Pérez		Socialist Party of the Canaries	Minister of Public Administration, Justice and Security	18 July 2019	15 July 2023	
Noemí Santana		Podemos	Minister of Social Rights, Equality, Diversity and Youth	18 July 2019	15 July 2023	
José Antonio Valbuena		Socialist Party of the Canaries	Minister of Ecological Transition, Fight Against Climate Change and Territorial Planning	18 July 2019	15 July 2023	
Alicia Vanoostende		Socialist Party of the Canaries	Minister of Agriculture, Livestock and Fisheries	18 July 2019	15 July 2023	
