= Second government of Fernando Clavijo =

Incumbent regional government of the Canary Islands

2nd government of Fernando Clavijo
- Government of the Canary Islands
- 2023–present
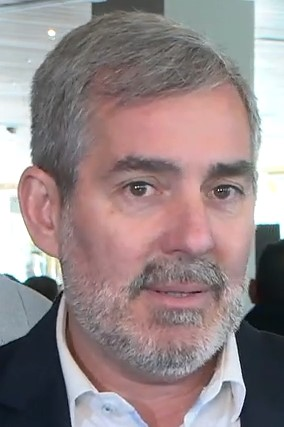
- Fernando Clavijo in February 2023.
- Date formed: 15 July 2023

People and organisations
- Monarch: Felipe VI
- President: Fernando Clavijo
- Vice President: Manuel Domínguez
- No. of ministers: 12 (Note: Does not include the President.)
- Total no. of members: 12
- Member party: CCa; PP; AHI; ASG (Note: Sub-ministry level.)
- Status in legislature: Majority coalition government
- Opposition party: PSOE
- Opposition leader: Ángel Víctor Torres

History
- Election: 2023 regional election
- Legislature term: 11th Parliament
- Predecessor: Torres

The Second government of Fernando Clavijo was formed on 15 July 2023, following the latter's election as President of the government of Canary Islands by the Parliament of the Canary Islands on 12 July and his swearing-in on 14 July, as a result of Canarian Coalition (CCa), the People's Party (PP), the Independent Herrenian Group (AHI) and Gomera Socialist Group (ASG) being able to muster a majority of seats in the Parliament following the 2023 Canarian regional election. It succeeded the government of Ángel Víctor Torres and has been the incumbent Government of the Canary Islands since 21 July 2023, a total of 621 days, or 1 year, 8 months and 12 days.

The cabinet comprises members of CCa, the PP and the AHI, as well as a number of members of ASG at sub-ministry level.

== Investiture ==
Investiture; Fernando Clavijo (CCa)
Ballot →	12 July 2023
Required majority →	36 out of 70
Yes: • CCa (19); • PP (15); • ASG (3); • AHI (1)	38 / 70
No: • PSOE (23); • NC–BC (5); • Vox (4)	32 / 70
Abstentions	0 / 70
Absentees	0 / 70

== Council of Government ==
The Government of the Canary Islands is structured into the offices for the president, the vice president and 12 ministries.

← Clavijo Government → (15 July 2023 – present)
Portfolio	Name	Party	Took office	Left office	Ref.
President	Fernando Clavijo	CCa	14 July 2023	Incumbent	
Vice President; Minister of Economy, Industry, Trade and Self-Employed	Manuel Domínguez	PP	15 July 2023	Incumbent	
Minister of Public Works, Housing and Mobility	Pablo Rodríguez Valido	CCa	15 July 2023	Incumbent	
Minister of Finance and Relations with the European Union	Matilde Pastora Asian	PP	15 July 2023	Incumbent	
Minister of the Presidency, Public Administration, Justice and Security	Nieves Lady Barreto	CCa	15 July 2023	Incumbent	
Minister of Education, Vocational Training, Physical Activity and Sport	Poli Suárez	PP	15 July 2023	Incumbent	
Minister of Territorial Policy, Territorial Cohesion and Waters	Manuel Miranda Medina	CCa	15 July 2023	Incumbent	
Minister of Tourism and Employment	Jessica de León Verdugo	PP	15 July 2023	Incumbent	
Minister of Universities, Science and Innovation and Culture	Migdalia María Machín	CCa	15 July 2023	Incumbent	
Minister of Ecological Transition and Energy	Mariano Hernández Zapata	PP	15 July 2023	Incumbent	
Minister of Social Welfare, Equality, Youth, Childhood and Families	María Candelaria Delgado	CCa	15 July 2023	Incumbent	
Minister of Universities, Science and Innovation and Culture	Esther María Monzón	CCa	15 July 2023	Incumbent	
Minister of Health	Narvay Quintero	AHI	15 July 2023	Incumbent	
