= Area of Scientific Importance =

Area of Scientific Importance (Spanish: Sitio de Interés Científico) is a protected area in nature and landscape protection defined by the Canarian Government, assigned to IUCN Category IV, but is not explicitly designated as a species protection area.

== Background ==
The Area was introduced in 1994 with the second nature protection law of the Canary Islands.

These areas are usually small in size and are home to animal and plant species that are endangered or of scientific interest. In July 1999, there were 19 Sitios de Interés Científico, covering a total area of 1404 hectares. This corresponded to 0.4% of the protected areas on the Canary Islands. No other protected areas of this type have been added since then (as of September 2014).

== Areas of scientific importance ==
La Palma

- Juan Major
- Barranco del Agua
- Las Salinas de Fuencaliente

La Gomera

- Acantilados de Alajero
- Charco del Conde
- Charco de Cieno

Tenerife

- Acantilado de La Hondura
- Tabaibal del Poris
- Los Acantilados de Isorana
- La Caleta
- interior
- Barranco de Ruiz

Gran Canary

- Jinámar
- Tufa
- Roque de Gando
- Juncalillo del Sur

Fuerteventura

- Playa del Matorral

Lanzarote

- los jameos
- Janubio
