= Mariano Hernández Zapata =

Spanish politician (born 1982)

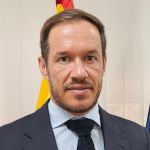
- Hernández in 2023

Minister of Ecological Transition and Energy of the Canary Islands
- Incumbent
- Assumed office 15 July 2023
- President: Fernando Clavijo Batlle
- Preceded by: José Antonio Valbuena Alonso

President of the Cabildo of La Palma
- In office 24 July 2019 – 27 June 2023
- Preceded by: Nieves Lady Barreto Hernández
- Succeeded by: Sergio Rodríguez Fernández

Member of the Senate
- In office 13 January 2016 – 4 March 2019
- Constituency: La Palma

Personal details
- Born: 26 August 1982 (age 43)
- Party: People's Party

Mariano Hernández Zapata (born 26 August 1982) is a Spanish politician serving as minister of ecological transition and energy in the government of the Canary Islands since 2023. From 2019 to 2023, he served as president of the cabildo insular of La Palma. From 2016 to 2019, he was a member of the Senate.
