= Parque García Sanabria =

Public park in Tenerife

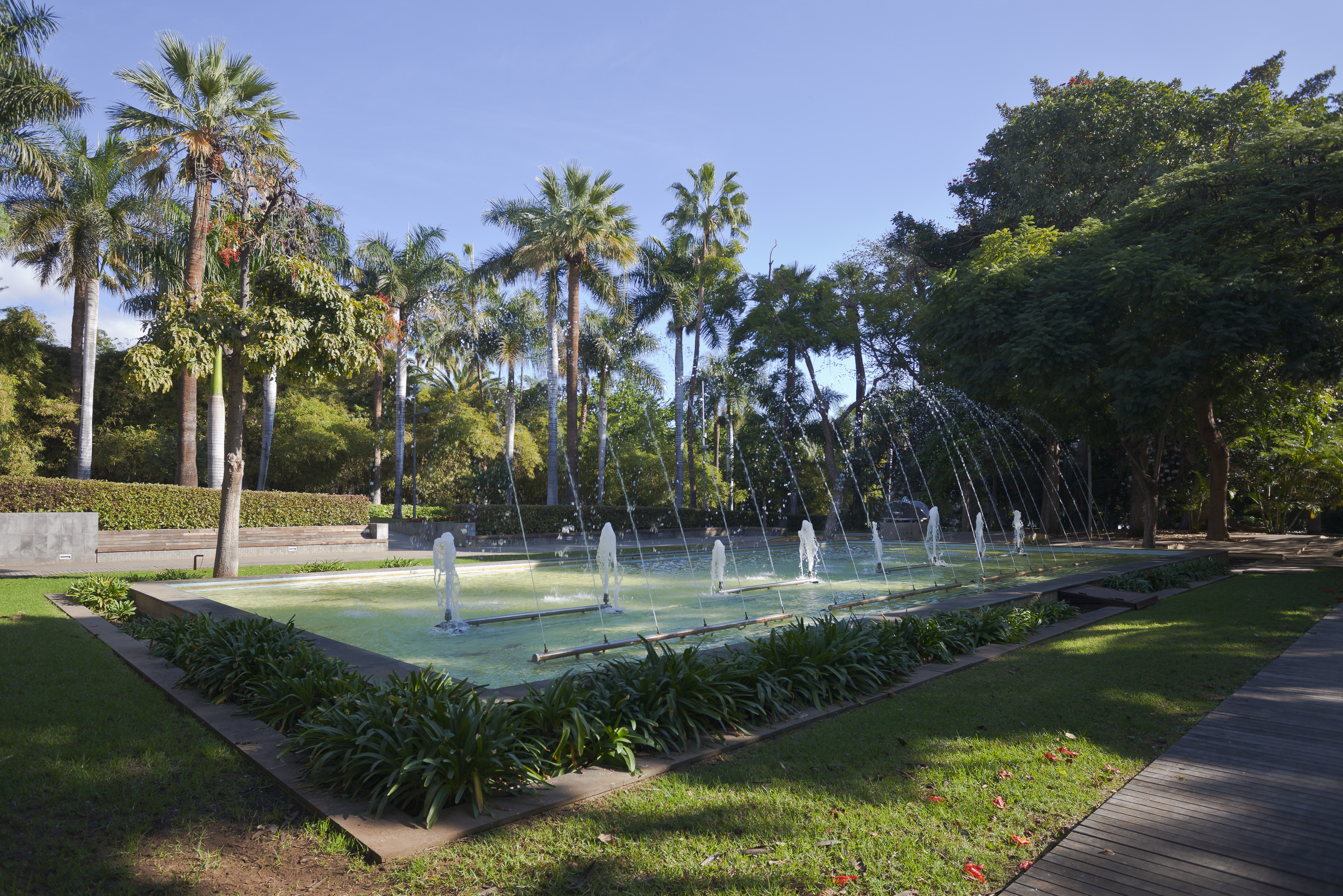
- Parque García Sanabria
- Interactive map of Parque García Sanabria
- Type: Urban park
- Location: Santa Cruz de Tenerife, Spain
- Coordinates: 28.472°N 16.254°W
- Area: 67,230 m^{2} (723,700 sq ft)
- Created: 1926
- Status: Open all year

Parque García Sanabria is a public urban park in the heart of Santa Cruz de Tenerife in Tenerife (Canary Islands, Spain). It was inaugurated in 1926. It is a large garden area, combined with fountains and architectural groups. The park is listed as a site of cultural interest in the Government of the Canary Islands.

Its name derives from the Mayor Garcia Sanabria, who approved its construction. It is the largest urban park in the Canary Islands. It has an area of 67,230 square metres (723,700 sq ft). In 1973 an international sculptural exposition took place there. Some sculptures, thirteen or so, were displayed on that occasion to adorn all corners and walks in the park.

== Flower clock ==
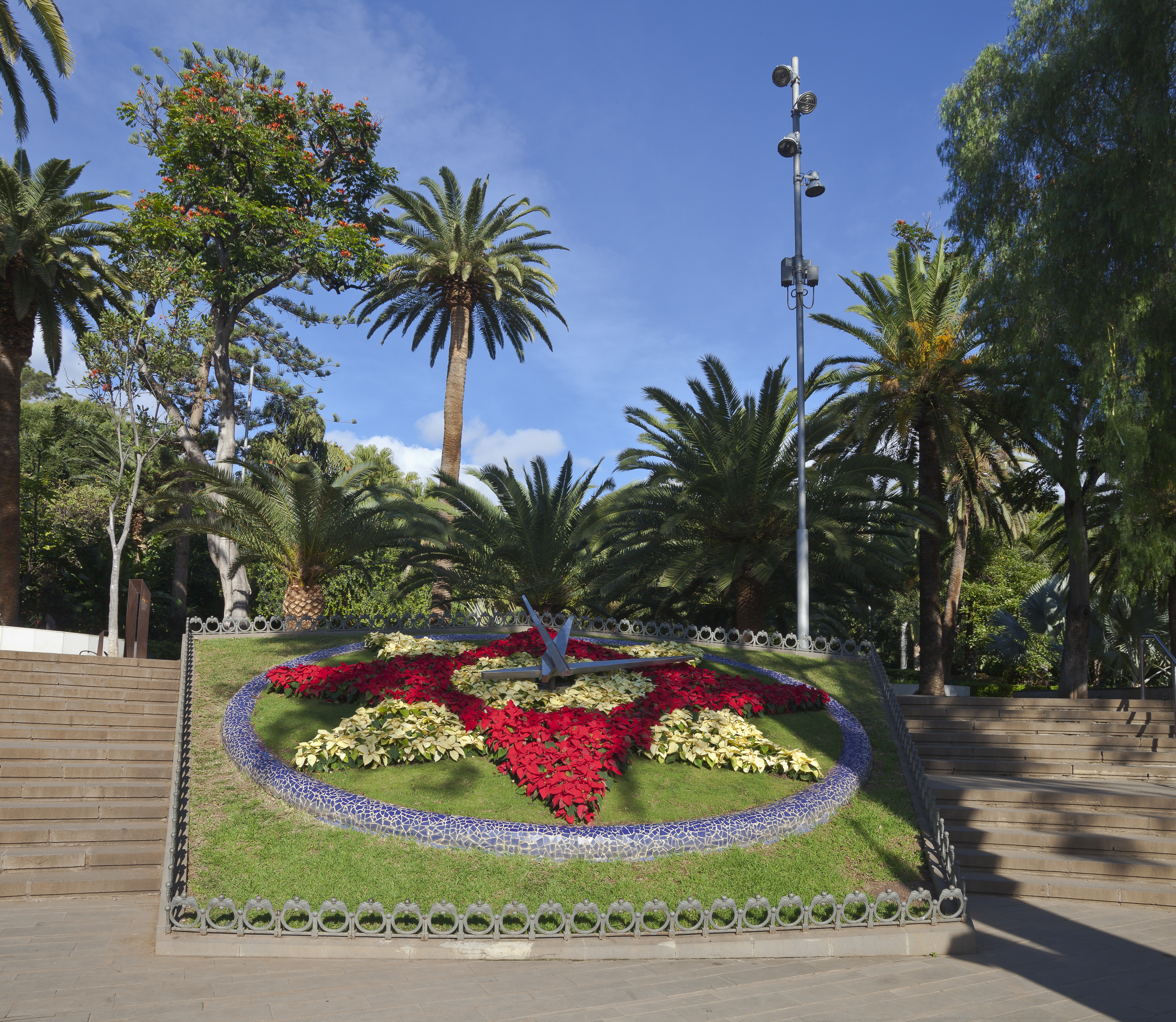
Flower clock

The park's floral clock was manufactured in Switzerland by Favag and was a gift from the Consul of Denmark to the island of Tenerife in 1958.

The flower clock is flanked by two staircases, behind which is the central fountain. It is characterized by constantly being planted with flowers throughout the year.

== Other data ==
Next to the park is the Plaza Fernando Pessoa which is considered the only zodiacal square of the Canary Islands and probably of Spain. The square is a representation of the astral situation at the time of the founding of Lisbon. The decoration of the square is made in the image of how the sky was at the time of the constitution of the Portuguese capital. The decoration of the fountain represents the position of the planets, and in the background appear the signs of the zodiac.
