= Jaime Martínez Veloz =

Mexican architect, writer and politician

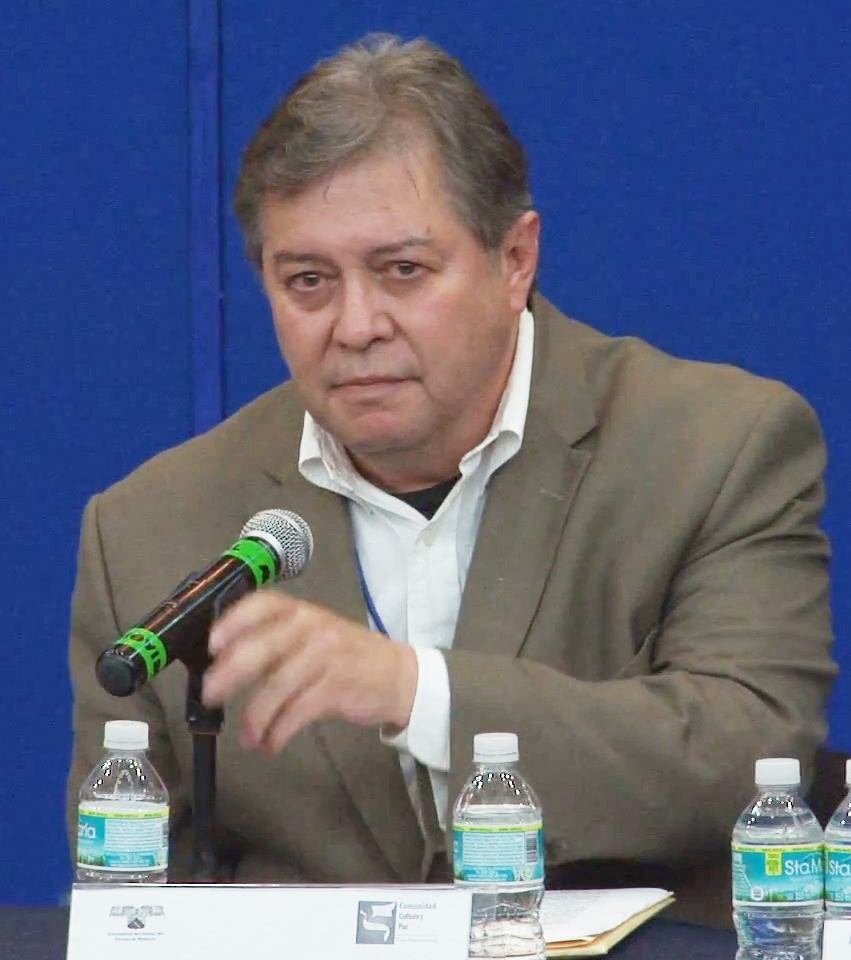
- Jaime Martínez Veloz in 2015
- Born: 9 April 1954 (age 72); Torreón, Coahuila, Mexico
- Education: Autonomous University of Coahuila
- Occupations: Politician, architect and writer
- Political party: PRD

Jaime Cleofas Martínez Veloz (born 9 April 1954) is a Mexican architect, writer and politician. At different times he has been affiliated with both the Institutional Revolutionary Party (PRI) and the Party of the Democratic Revolution (PRD).

In the 1994 general election he was elected to the Chamber of Deputies for the PRI in Baja California's 6th district, and in the 2000 general election he was elected to the Chamber of Deputies as a plurinominal deputy for the PRD.

In between his two terms as a federal congressman, he served as a local deputy in the 16th session of the Congress of Baja California (1998–2001).
