= Luis Rodolfo Enríquez Martínez =

Mexican politician

- Born: 23 June 1970 (age 55); Tijuana, Baja California, Mexico
- Occupation: Politician
- Political party: PAN

Luis Rodolfo Enríquez Martínez (born 23 June 1970) is a Mexican politician affiliated with the National Action Party (PAN). In the 2006 general election he was elected to the Chamber of Deputies to represent Baja California's 6th district during the 60th session of Congress.
