= Victor González (politician, born 1975) =

Spanish businessman and politician

Victor González MP

Member of the Congress of Deputies
- Incumbent
- Assumed office 10 November 2019
- Constituency: Salamanca

Personal details
- Born: Victor Guido Gonzalez Coello de Portugal; 5 September 1975 (age 51) Salamanca, Kingdom of Spain
- Party: Vox
- Education: University of Portsmouth Complutense University of Madrid

Victor Guido Gonzalez Coello de Portugal (born September 5, 1975) is a Spanish businessman and politician. He is a member of the Congress of Deputies for the Vox party.

== Biography ==
González graduated with a degree in European Business from the University of Portsmouth in the United Kingdom followed by a Master's in finance at the Complutense University of Madrid. He was the founder of a management consultancy business called Management Productive Resources SL and ran a number of local companies including a taxi firm which he owned with Louis Alphonse de Bourbon. According to media reports, González was investigated for "accounting irregularities" during his business career.

He was elected to the Congress of Deputies in the November 2019 Spanish general election for Vox representing the Salamanca constituency. He also serves as Vox's spokesman on economic policy.

González travelled to Bolivia in January 2020, shortly after the coup that overthrew the socialist president Evo Morales in order to show his support for the new government.
