= Fabián Chinea =

Spanish politician (born 1992)

Member of the Senate
- Incumbent
- Assumed office 19 July 2019
- Preceded by: Yaiza Castilla Herrera
- Constituency: La Gomera

Personal details
- Born: 21 November 1992 (age 33)
- Party: Gomera Socialist Group

Fabián Chinea Correa (born 21 November 1992) is a Spanish politician serving as a member of the Senate since 2019. He has been a member of the Parliamentary Assembly of the Council of Europe since 2021.
