= Miguel Antonio Osuna Millán =

Mexican politician

- Born: 1 March 1970 (age 56); Sinaloa, Mexico
- Occupation: Politician
- Political party: PAN

Miguel Antonio Osuna Millán (born 1 March 1970) is a Mexican politician from the National Action Party (PAN). In the 2009 mid-terms he was elected to the Chamber of Deputies to represent Baja California's 6th district during the 61st session of Congress.
