= 6th federal electoral district of Baja California =

Federal electoral district of Mexico

Baja California's 6th
- Electoral district of the Chamber of Deputies of Mexico

Incumbent
- Member: Gilberto Herrera Solórzano
- Party: ▌Morena
- Congress: 66th (2024–2027)

District
- State: Baja California
- Head town: Tijuana
- Coordinates: 32°31′N 117°02′W
- Covers: Tijuana (part)
- PR region: First
- Precincts: 286
- Population: 424,896 (2020 census)

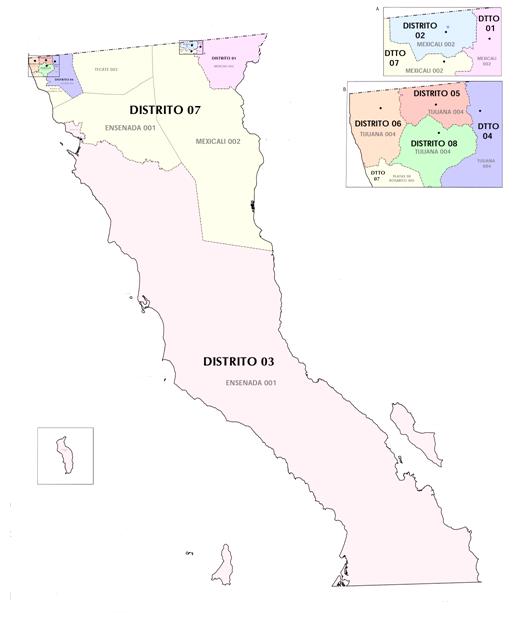
Baja California under the 2017–2022 districting scheme

Baja California's districts between 2005 and 2017

The 6th federal electoral district of Baja California (Spanish: Distrito electoral federal 06 de Baja California) is one of the 300 electoral districts into which Mexico is divided for elections to the federal Chamber of Deputies and one of nine such districts in the state of Baja California.

It elects one deputy to the lower house of Congress for each three-year legislative session by means of the first-past-the-post system. Votes cast in the district also count towards the calculation of proportional representation ("plurinominal") deputies elected from the first region.

The 6th district was created by the 1977 electoral reforms and was first contested in the 1979 mid-term election. The current member for the district, elected in the 2024 general election, is Gilberto Herrera Solórzano of the National Regeneration Movement (Morena).

== District territory ==
Under its 2023 districting plan, which is to be used for the 2024, 2027 and 2030 federal elections, the National Electoral Institute increased Baja California's seat allocation from eight to nine. The 6th district covers 286 precincts (secciones electorales) in the north-west of the municipality of Tijuana, adjacent to the Pacific Ocean and the U.S. border. (Note: The 4th, 5th and 8th districts cover the remainder of the municipality.)

The head town (cabecera distrital), where results from individual polling stations are gathered together and tallied, is the city of Tijuana. The district reported a population of 424,896 in the 2020 census.

== Previous districting schemes ==
Evolution of electoral district numbers
	1974	1978	1996	2005	2017	2023
Baja California	3	6	6	8	8	9
Chamber of Deputies	196	300				

2017–2022

Between 2017 and 2022, the 6th district covered 283 precincts in the north-west of the municipality of Tijuana. The head town was at Tijuana.

2005–2017

From 2005 to 2017, the district comprised the north-west portion of the municipality of Tijuana. The head town was at Tijuana.

1996–2005

Between 1996 and 2005, the district was located in the north-west of the municipality of Tijuana. The head town was at Tijuana.

1978–1996

The districting scheme in force from 1978 to 1996 was the result of the 1977 electoral reforms, which increased the number of single-member seats in the Chamber of Deputies from 196 to 300. Under that plan, Baja California's seat allocation rose from three to six. The newly created 6th district covered a part of the city of Tijuana and the rural part of its surrounding municipality.

== Deputies returned to Congress ==
(Mexico) National parties
- Current
- PAN
- PRI
- PT
- PVEM
- MC
- Morena
- PAZ
- Somos
- Defunct or local only
- PLM
- PNR
- PRM
- PNM
- PP
- PPS
- PARM
- PFCRN
- CON
- PANAL
- PSD
- PES
- PES
- PRD

Baja California's 6th district
Election	Deputy	Party	Term	Legislature
1979	Rafael García Vázquez	Institutional Revolutionary Party	1979–1982	51st Congress
1982	Leopoldo Durán Rentería	Institutional Revolutionary Party	1982–1985	52nd Congress
1985	Jorge Salceda Vargas	Institutional Revolutionary Party	1985–1988	53rd Congress
1988	Mercedes Erdmann Baltazar	Institutional Revolutionary Party	1988–1991	54th Congress
1991	Carlos Tomás Esparza	National Action Party (Mexico)	1991–1994	55th Congress
1994	Jaime Cleofas Martínez Veloz	Institutional Revolutionary Party	1994–1997	56th Congress
1997	José de Jesús González Reyes (Note: González Reyes resigned his seat on 3 February 1999.); Francisca Haydee García Acedo	National Action Party (Mexico)	1997–1999; 1999–2000	57th Congress
2000	César Alejandro Monraz Sustaita	National Action Party (Mexico)	2000–2003	58th Congress
2003	Víctor Manuel González Reyes	National Action Party (Mexico)	2003–2006	59th Congress
2006	Luis Rodolfo Enríquez Martínez (Note: Enríquez Martínez resigned his seat on 30 November 2007.); Alma Xóchitl Cardona Benavides	National Action Party (Mexico)	2006–2009	60th Congress
2009	Miguel Antonio Osuna Millán	National Action Party (Mexico)	2009–2012	61st Congress
2012	Jaime Chris López Alvarado	Institutional Revolutionary Party	2012–2015	62nd Congress
2015	María Luisa Sánchez Meza	National Action Party (Mexico)	2015–2018	63rd Congress
2018	Javier Julián Castañeda Pomposo (Note: Elected for the Social Encounter Party, Castañeda Pomposo switched allegiance to the National Regeneration Movement on 3 September 2019.)	Social Encounter Party National Regeneration Movement	2018–2021	64th Congress
2021	Héctor Ireneo Mares Cossío	National Regeneration Movement	2021–2024	65th Congress
2024	Gilberto Herrera Solórzano	National Regeneration Movement	2024–2027	66th Congress

== Presidential elections ==
Baja California's 6th district
Election	District won by	Party or coalition	%
2018	Andrés Manuel López Obrador	Juntos Haremos Historia	62.0387
2024	Claudia Sheinbaum Pardo	Sigamos Haciendo Historia	63.8440
