= Jaime Chris López =

Mexican politician

Jaime Chris López Alvarado
- Born: 17 September 1979 (age 46); Tijuana, Baja California, Mexico
- Status: Married
- Political party: PRI

Jaime Chris López Alvarado (born 17 September 1979) is a Mexican politician affiliated with the Institutional Revolutionary Party (PRI). He served as a local deputy during the 19th session of the Congress of Baja California (2007–2010) and, in the 2012 general election, he was elected to the federal Chamber of Deputies to represent Baja California's 6th district during the 62nd session of Congress.
