= José Antonio Valbuena Alonso =

Spanish politician (born 1973)

Member of the Senate
- Incumbent
- Assumed office 26 July 2023
- Appointed by: Parliament of the Canary Islands
- In office 28 April 2019 – 16 July 2019
- Succeeded by: Pedro Meneses
- Constituency: Tenerife

Personal details
- Born: 18 January 1973 (age 53)
- Party: Spanish Socialist Workers' Party

José Antonio Valbuena Alonso (born 18 January 1973) is a Spanish politician. He has been a member of the Senate since 2023, having previously served from April to July 2019. From 2019 to 2023, he served as minister for ecological transition, climate action and territorial planning of the Canary Islands.
