= Víctor Manuel González Reyes =

Mexican politician

- Born: 17 June 1965 (age 60); Tijuana, Baja California, Mexico
- Occupation: Politician
- Political party: PAN

Víctor Manuel González Reyes (born 17 June 1965) is a Mexican politician affiliated with the National Action Party (PAN). In the 2003 mid-terms he was elected to the Chamber of Deputies to represent Baja California's 6th district during the 59th session of Congress.
