= Gomera Socialist Group =

Gomera Socialist Group Agrupación Socialista Gomera
- Leader: Casimiro Curbelo
- Founder: Casimiro Curbelo
- Founded: 6 March 2015
- Split from: Spanish Socialist Workers' Party
- Headquarters: Calle Profesor Armas Fernández, 29; 38800 San Sebastián de La Gomera
- Ideology: Social democracy Insularism
- Political position: Centre-left
- European affiliation: Unified European Left
- Colours
- Congress of Deputies: 0 / 350
- Spanish Senate (Gomeran seats): 1 / 1
- European Parliament (Spanish seats): 0 / 61
- Canarian Parliament (La Gomera seats): 3 / 4
- Council of La Gomera: 11 / 17
- Councillors in the whole island of La Gomera: 34 / 64

Website
- agrupacionsocialistagomera.es

The Gomera Socialist Group (Spanish: Agrupación Socialista Gomera, ASG) is a minor political party in Spain operating on the island of La Gomera in the Canary Islands. It was founded in 2015 by Casimiro Curbelo, current president of the Cabildo de La Gomera, after breaking away from the local branch of the Spanish Socialist Workers' Party (PSOE). It is currently in the administration of five of the six municipalities of La Gomera.

== Election results ==
=== Parliament of the Canary Islands ===
Parliament of the Canary Islands
Election	Votes	%	Seats	+/–	Leading candidate	Government
2015	5,090	0.56 (#12)	3 / 60	—	Casimiro Curbelo	Opposition
2019	6,222	0.70 (#10)	3 / 70	0	Casimiro Curbelo	Coalition
2023	6,112	0.69 (#10)	3 / 70	0	Casimiro Curbelo	Coalition

=== Senate of Spain ===
Senate
Election	La Gomera				
Election	Votes		%	Seats	+/–
2015	Yaiza Castilla	4,435	42.93	1 / 1	—
2016	Yaiza Castilla	4,340	42.54	1 / 1	0
Apr. 2019	Yaiza Castilla	5,611	51.90	1 / 1	0
Nov. 2019	Fabián Chinea	3,628	40.14	1 / 1	0
2023	Fabián Chinea	3,820	37.96	1 / 1	0
