= Víctor González (politician, born 1987) =

Spanish politician (born 1987)

Member of the Senate
- Incumbent
- Assumed office 28 July 2022
- Appointed by: Parliament of Andalusia

Personal details
- Born: 15 August 1987 (age 38)
- Party: Spanish Socialist Workers' Party

Víctor González Fernández (born 15 August 1987) is a Spanish politician serving as a member of the Senate since 2022. He is a municipal councillor of Vélez-Málaga.
