= Yaiza Castilla Herrera =

Spanish politician

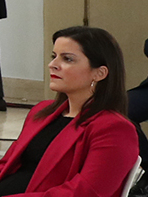

Minister of Tourism, Industry and Commerce of Canary Islands
- Incumbent
- Assumed office 18 July 2019

Senator in the Cortes Generales
- In office 13 January 2016 – 18 July 2019
- Succeeded by: Fabián Chinea

Personal details
- Born: 5 July 1984 (age 42) San Sebastián de La Gomera
- Citizenship: Spain

Yaiza Castilla Herrera (born 5 July 1984 in San Sebastián de La Gomera, Spain) is a Spanish politician and former senator. She served in the Senate of Spain representing La Gomera in the 11th and 12th Legislatures of Spain between 2015 and 2019. She was appointed Minister of Tourism, Industry and Commerce since 17 July 2019 for Canary Islands by President Ángel Víctor Torres.

== Biography and career ==
Herrera was born in San Sebastián de La Gomera in 1984. She attended the University of La Laguna where she graduated with a master's degree in Urban Law. After her education, she worked as a freelance attorney before joining Garrigues.

In 2015, during the general elections contested for a sit in the Senate through the Gomera Socialist Group. While she was in the senate, she was a member of the Equality Commission.
