= Jaime López (painter) =

Spanish painter

Jaime López (15th century) was a Spanish painter, active during the early-Renaissance period. He was nicknamed El Muño. He was born in Madrid. He decorated the Hermitage of our Lady of Prado.
