= Victor Antonio González =

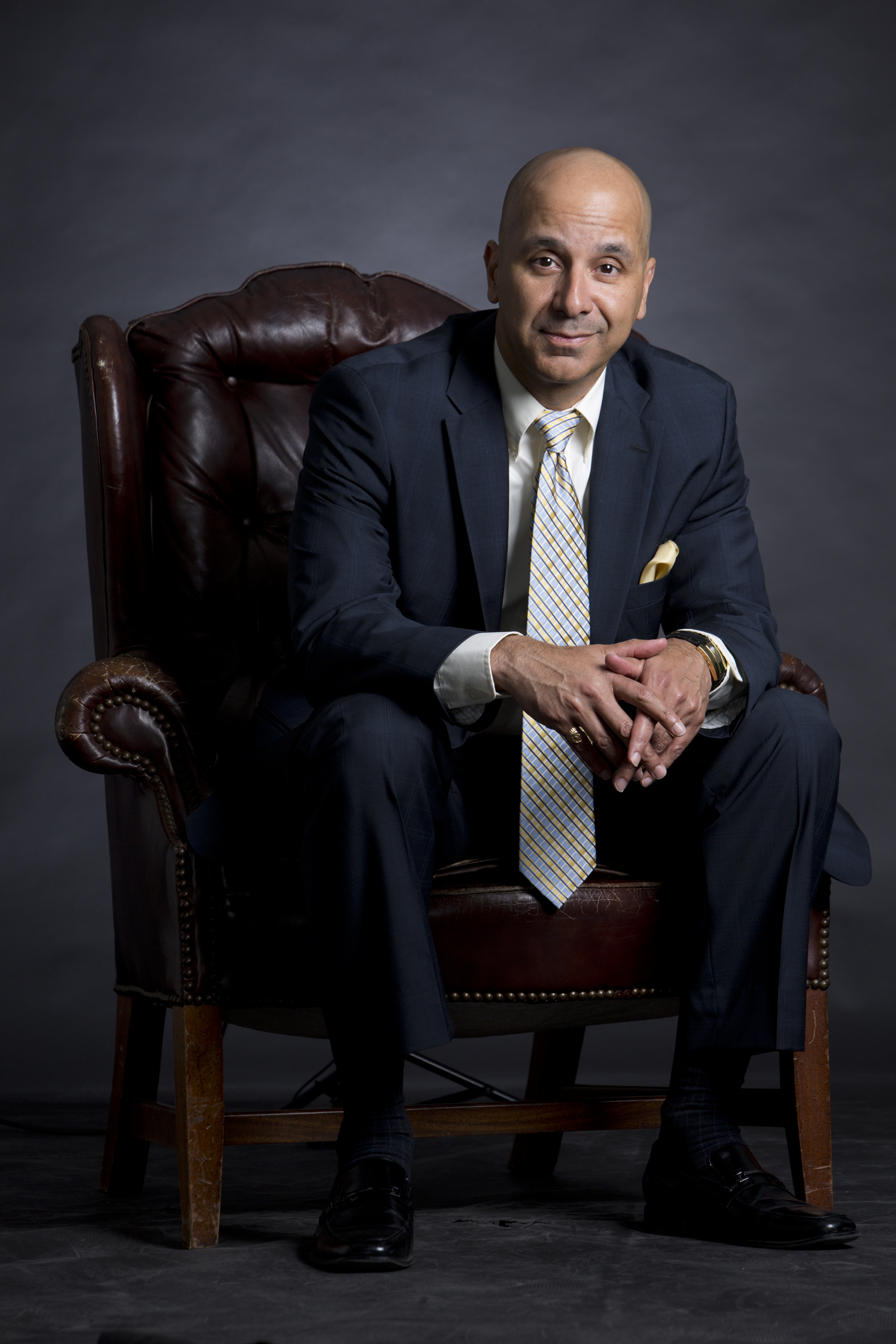
- Born: January 13, 1963 (age 63); Chicago, Illinois
- Education: B.E., Illinois Institute of Technology; MBA, Cardinal Stritch University
- Occupations: author, business consultant and host
- Organization: Sellinger Group
- Known for: Life or Debt (TV series)
- Website: https://www.sellingergroup.com/

Victor Antonio González (Chicago, United States, January 13, 1963) is an American author, business consultant and host. He is best known for being host of Spike TV's reality series, Life or Debt.

== Biography ==
Victor Antonio has a bachelor of science in electrical engineering degree from the Illinois Institute of Technology in 1986 and a master's degree in business administration from Cardinal Stritch University in 1998.

In 2001, Victor Antonio launched his own consulting business, Sellinger Group. In that same year, he became a volunteer for S.C.O.R.E. (Senior Corp of Retired Executives) an organization dedicated to helping small business owners and entrepreneurs grow and launch their business.

In 2003 he published his first book title, The Logic of Success: Why Some People Succeed While Others Fail.

In 2007, he launched his first sales training program and first book on selling, Sales Influence: Finding the Why in How People Buy. He has written several other books on the topic including: Winning the Business Back, Cold Calling Success, Selling Ain't Hard, The Tao of Selling, and Response Block Selling and Sales Models.

In 2017 he launched the Sales Master Academy, an online Learning Management System (LMS) with over 25 courses on sales.

Victor published Sales Ex Machina: How Artificial Intelligence is Changing the World of Selling in 2018.

HIs most recent book, Priced to Win: The Sales Leader's Framework for Closing Deals Without Caving on Price, was published through Wiley in 2026.

=== Reality series ===
In 2014, he developed a reality television show for Spike TV in conjunction with Ugly Brother Studios. The premise of the show was to help families who were struggling financially. The name of the show was "Family Takeover". The pilot was completed in 2015 after which Spike approved season 1, which consists of 10 episodes. Season one launched in 2016 under the new name Life or Debt. Spike TV decided not to renew the show afterwards.
