= November 2019 Spanish general election =

- 10 November 2019

All 350 seats in the Congress of Deputies and 208 (of 265) seats in the Senate 176 seats needed for a majority in the Congress of Deputies
- Opinion polls
- Registered: 37,001,379 ▲0.3%
- Turnout: 24,507,715 (66.2%) ▼5.5 pp
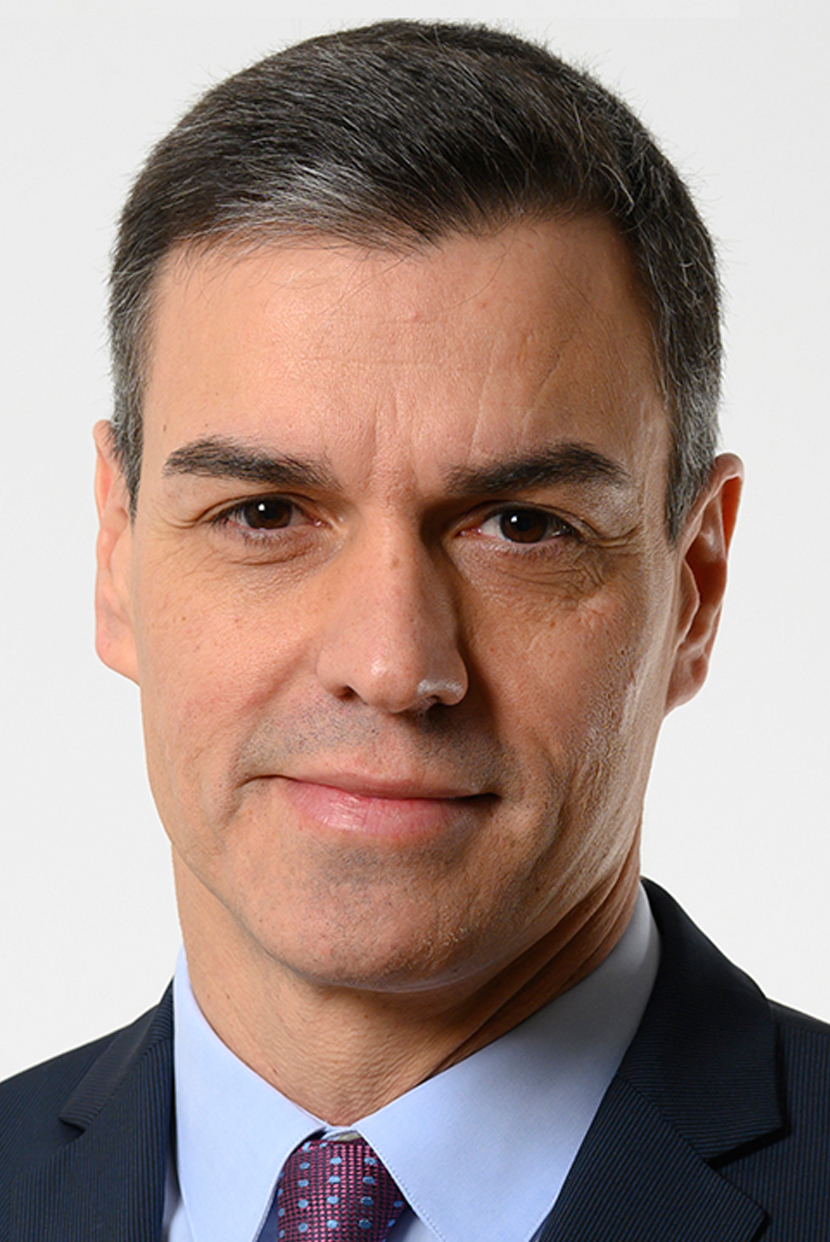

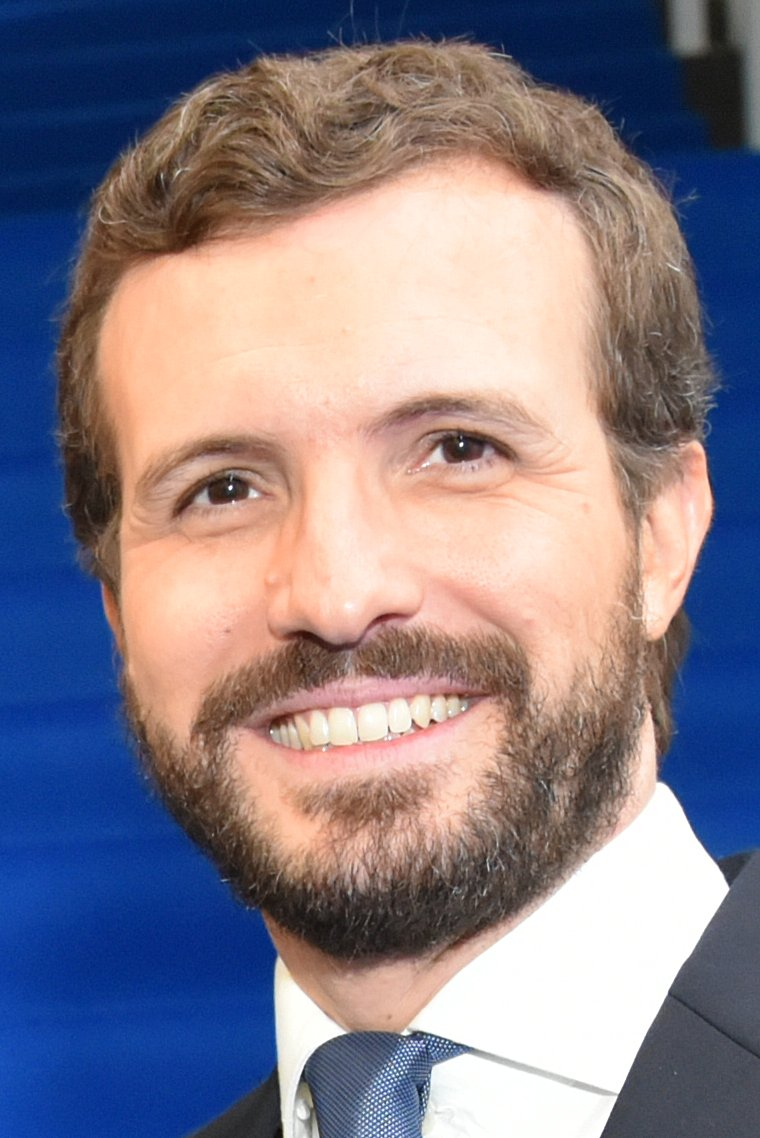

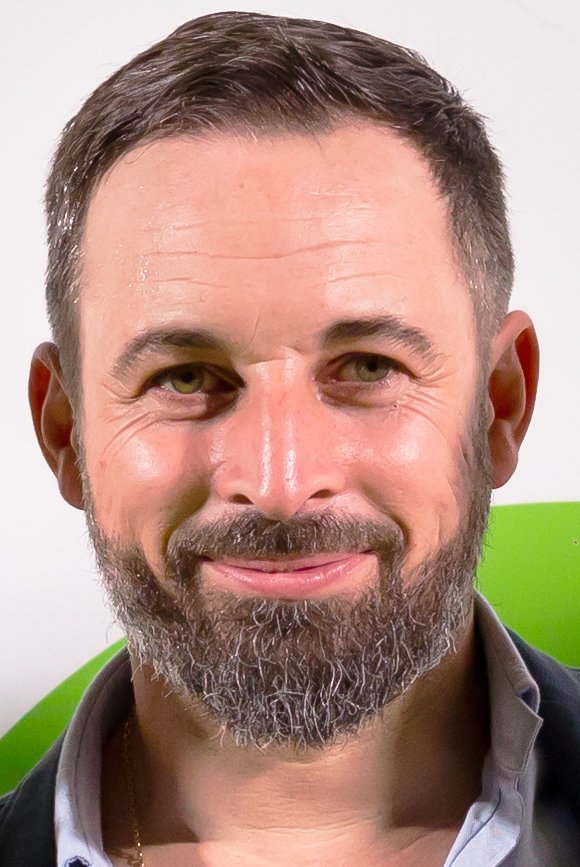

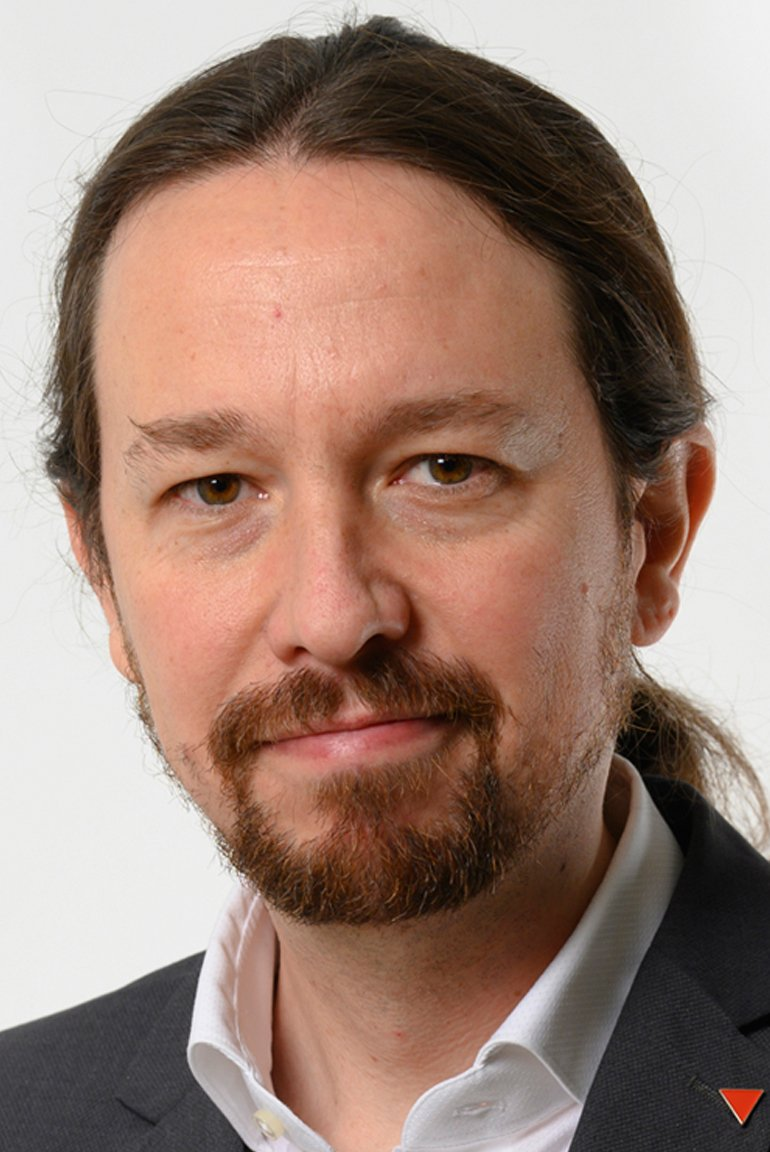

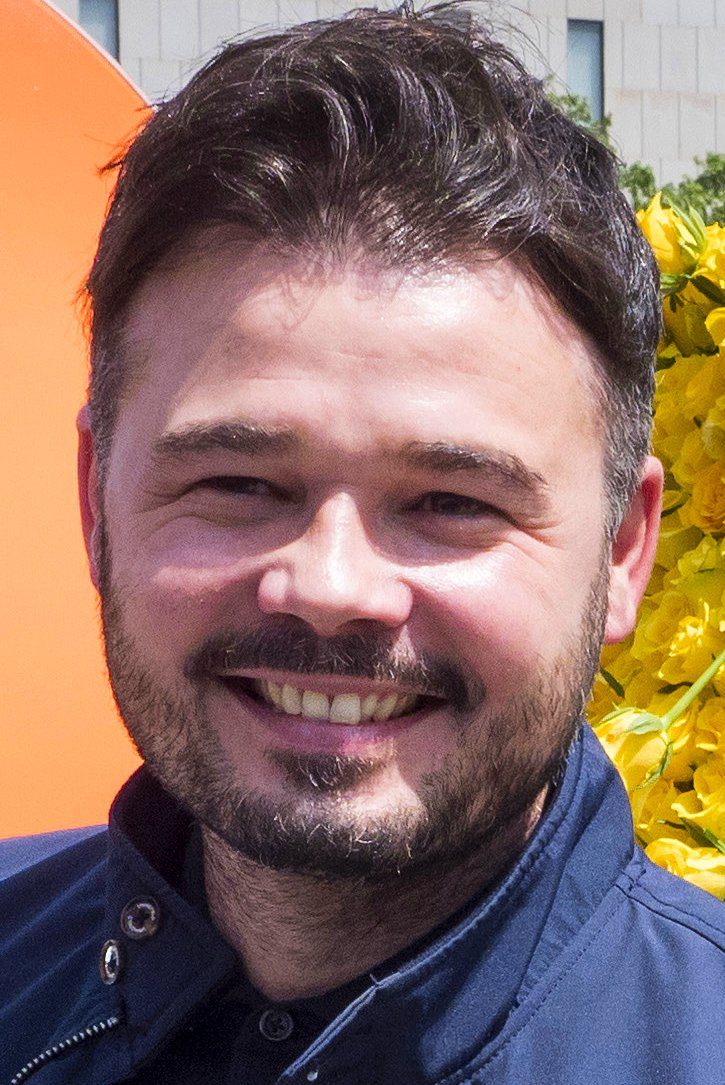

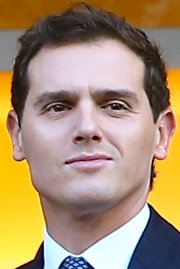
	First party	Second party	Third party
Leader	Pedro Sánchez	Pablo Casado	Santiago Abascal
Party	PSOE	PP	Vox
Leader since	18 June 2017	21 July 2018	20 September 2014
Leader's seat	Madrid	Madrid	Madrid
Last election	123 seats, 28.7%	66 seats, 16.7%	24 seats, 10.3%
Seats won	120	89	52
Seat change	▼3	▲23	▲28
Popular vote	6,792,199	5,047,040	3,656,979
Percentage	28.0%	20.8%	15.1%
Swing	▼0.7 pp	▲4.1 pp	▲4.8 pp
	Fourth party	Fifth party	Sixth party
Leader	Pablo Iglesias	Gabriel Rufián (Note: Oriol Junqueras and Jordi Sànchez were initially proclaimed as lead candidates for ERC and JxCat, respectively. On 14 October 2019, they were disqualified after being convicted by the Supreme Court following the trial of Catalonia independence leaders. As a result, Gabriel Rufián and Laura Borràs went on to lead the lists for their respective parties.)	Albert Rivera
Party	Unidas Podemos (Note: Total figures include results for En Comú Podem and En Común.)	ERC–Sobiranistes	Cs
Leader since	15 November 2014	14 October 2019	9 July 2006
Leader's seat	Madrid	Barcelona	Madrid
Last election	42 seats, 14.3%	15 seats, 3.9%	57 seats, 15.9%
Seats won	35	13	10
Seat change	▼7	▼2	▼47
Popular vote	3,119,364	880,734	1,650,318
Percentage	12.9%	3.6%	6.8%
Swing	▼1.4 pp	▼0.3 pp	▼9.1 pp
Prime Minister before election
Pedro Sánchez (acting)
PSOE
Prime Minister after election
Pedro Sánchez
PSOE

A general election was held in Spain on 10 November 2019 to elect the members of the 14th Cortes Generales under the Spanish Constitution of 1978. All 350 seats in the Congress of Deputies were up for election, as well as 208 of 265 seats in the Senate. It was a repeat election under the provisions of Article 99.5 of the Constitution, as a result of the failure in government formation negotiations following the previous general election.

The April 2019 election had seen the Spanish Socialist Workers' Party (PSOE) becoming the only party that could realistically form a government. Overconfidence after the local, regional and European Parliament elections in May, political differences, and disagreements over ministerial posts with Pablo Iglesias's Unidas Podemos, thwarted Pedro Sánchez's re-election bid as prime minister of Spain in July. With no further negotiations during the summer and into September, King Felipe VI declined to nominate any candidate for investiture, leading to a fresh election on 10 November. The failure in negotiations prompted former Podemos's founder Íñigo Errejón to turn his regional Más Madrid party—which had debuted in the Madrid regional election—into a national alliance (Más País), comprising a number of regional parties and former Podemos and United Left allies, such as Coalició Compromís, Equo or Chunta Aragonesista, while also being joined by a number of Podemos officials.

The election campaign was overshadowed by the Spanish Supreme Court's verdict in the trial of Catalonia independence leaders, convicted of crimes of sedition and embezzlement for events related to the 2017 Catalan independence referendum and the 2017–2018 Catalan crisis. This prompted protests and riots in Catalonia, including an assault on the Barcelona–El Prat Airport by the Democratic Tsunami and Committees for the Defense of the Republic groups, while the Catalan government under Quim Torra rejected violence but called for peaceful rallies in support of the convicted leaders. Later into October, Sánchez's government enforced the exhumation of late dictator Francisco Franco's remains from the Valley of the Fallen mausoleum and their reburial at Mingorrubio Cemetery.

At 66.2%, voter turnout was the lowest since the Spanish transition to democracy, beating the previous negative record set at the 2016 repeat election. Results saw a partial recovery for the opposition People's Party (PP) under Pablo Casado and large gains for the far-right Vox party, both at the expense of Citizens (Cs), which prompted party leader Albert Rivera to quit politics. Both PSOE and Unidas Podemos saw slight decreases in support, but were still able to outperform the combined strength of PP, Vox and Cs; consequently, both parties agreed to set aside their political feuds and successfully negotiated a government in the days following the election, to become the first governing coalition in Spain since the Second Spanish Republic. The tenure of the newly formed government would be quickly overshadowed by the outbreak of the COVID-19 pandemic in March 2020 and its political and economic consequences.

== Background ==
The April 2019 general election resulted in a clear victory for the ruling Spanish Socialist Workers' Party (PSOE) under the acting prime minister of Spain, Pedro Sánchez, but also in a highly fragmented parliament, with the right divided between the People's Party (PP), Citizens (Cs) and the far-right Vox. With both a grand coalition with the PP and a 180 seat-agreement with Cs ruled out because of mutual vetoes, a deal between the PSOE and Pablo Iglesias's left-wing Unidas Podemos—backed by smaller parties—appeared as the most viable outcome.

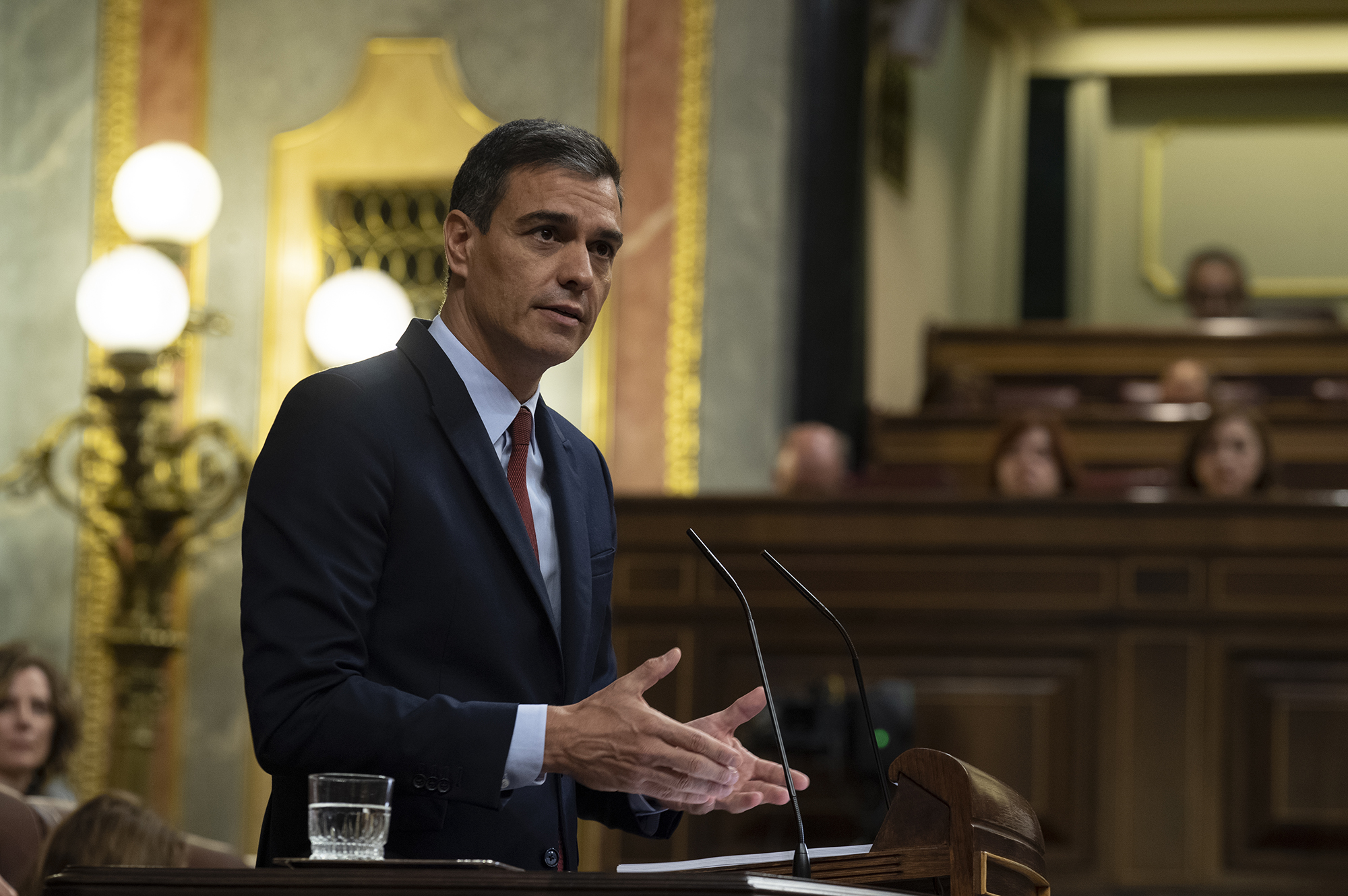
Mutual mistrust between PSOE and Unidas Podemos and a clash over the future cabinet's composition resulted in a political deadlock that led to Pedro Sánchez's investiture being defeated on 25 July 2019.

Talks were delayed until after the May 2019 local, regional and European Parliament elections, whose results largely confirmed the PSOE's general election gains. However, Podemos's poor performance allowed right-wing alliances between the PP, Cs and Vox to take or retain control of several key institutions, particularly the Madrid city council and the regional governments of Castile and León, Madrid and Murcia. This encouraged the PSOE to push for a single-party government with confidence and supply support rather than the coalition demanded by Podemos. At the same time, Cs was weakened by internal divisions over Albert Rivera's decision to prioritize the PP—including Vox—and veto any PSOE-led government; this led to the departure of critics such as Manuel Valls (former French prime minister and party leader in Barcelona, who gave support to Ada Colau's election as local mayor to prevent a pro-Catalan independence administration) and Toni Roldán (the party's economics spokesman). Meanwhile, Podemos also faced a party crisis marked by growing ideological and personal tensions, seeing the split of co-founder Íñigo Errejón into the Más Madrid platform and followed by further resignations among leading members.

After receiving King Felipe VI's nomination to attempt investiture, a political deadlock ensued as Sánchez and Iglesias clashed over the government's composition. Podemos demanded ministerial posts, while the PSOE offered only secondary positions. Both parties exchanged proposals in an attempt to pressure the other, until Iglesias eventually withdrew his demand to personally join the cabinet as it became clear that his presence—and disagreements over issues such as the Catalan crisis—was a major obstacle for Sánchez. Even so, deep mistrust between the two parties, negotiation leaks, continuous accusations, and disagreements over portfolios (especially equality and labour), prevented an agreement and led to a breakdown in talks. Sánchez's investiture bid was defeated 155–124 on 25 July 2019, with PP and Cs voting against (neither willing to abstain), Podemos abstaining, and smaller parties refusing to commit without a clear deal.

The summer recess ended without progress, as Sánchez postponed further negotiations until September while the PSOE hardened its position and withdrew its previous offer to include Podemos in the government without Iglesias. Final proposals saw the PSOE offering a programme of 370 policy measures and key responsibilities in state institutions outside the cabinet, while Podemos proposed a one-year trial coalition. A last-minute move by Rivera—who U-turned on his previous stance—offered Cs's abstention if it was joined by the PP and linked to certain conditions on taxation, Catalonia and government formation in Navarre, but the proposal failed to gain support. After further consultations by King Felipe VI produced no agreement, a snap election was called for 10 November 2019 amid mutual accusations among the parties.

== Overview ==
Under the 1978 Constitution, the Spanish Cortes Generales were conceived as an imperfect bicameral system. The Congress of Deputies held greater legislative power than the Senate, having the ability to grant or withdraw confidence from a prime minister and to override Senate vetoes by an absolute majority. Nonetheless, the Senate retained a limited number of specific functions—such as ratifying international treaties, authorizing cooperation agreements between autonomous communities, enforcing direct rule, regulating interterritorial compensation funds, and taking part in constitutional amendments and in the appointment of members to the Constitutional Court and the General Council of the Judiciary—which were not subject to override by Congress.

=== Date ===
The term of each chamber of the Cortes Generales—the Congress and the Senate—expired four years from the date of their previous election, unless they were dissolved earlier. The election decree was required to be issued no later than 25 days before the scheduled expiration date of parliament and published on the following day in the Official State Gazette (BOE), with election day taking place 54 days after the decree's publication. The previous election was held on 28 April 2019, which meant that the chambers' terms would have expired on 28 April 2023. The election decree was required to be published in the BOE no later than 4 April 2023, setting the latest possible date for election day on 28 May 2023.

The prime minister had the prerogative to propose the monarch to dissolve both chambers at any given time—either jointly or separately—and call a snap election, provided that no motion of no confidence was in process, no state of emergency was in force and that dissolution did not occur before one year after a previous one. Additionally, both chambers were to be dissolved and a new election called if an investiture process failed to elect a prime minister within a two-month period from the first ballot. Barring this exception, there was no constitutional requirement for simultaneous elections to the Congress and the Senate. Still, as of 2026, there has been no precedent of separate elections taking place under the 1978 Constitution.

The Cortes Generales were officially dissolved on 24 September 2019 with the publication of the corresponding decree in the BOE, setting election day for 10 November and scheduling for both chambers to reconvene on 3 December.

=== Electoral system ===
Voting for each chamber of the Cortes Generales was based on universal suffrage, comprising all Spanish nationals over 18 years of age with full political rights, provided that they had not been deprived of the right to vote by a final sentence. Additionally, non-resident citizens were required to apply for voting, a system known as "begged" voting (Spanish: Voto rogado).

The Congress of Deputies had a minimum of 300 and a maximum of 400 seats, with electoral provisions fixing its size at 350. Of these, 348 were elected in 50 multi-member constituencies corresponding to the provinces of Spain—each of which was assigned an initial minimum of two seats and the remaining 248 distributed in proportion to population—using the D'Hondt method and closed-list proportional voting, with a three percent-threshold of valid votes (including blank ballots) in each constituency. The remaining two seats were allocated to Ceuta and Melilla as single-member districts elected by plurality voting. The use of this electoral method resulted in a higher effective threshold depending on district magnitude and vote distribution.

As a result of the aforementioned allocation, each Congress multi-member constituency was entitled the following seats:

Seats	Constituencies
37	Madrid
32	Barcelona
15	Valencia
12	Alicante, Seville
11	Málaga
10	Murcia
9	Cádiz
8	A Coruña, Balearic Islands, Biscay, Las Palmas
7	Asturias, Granada, Pontevedra, Santa Cruz de Tenerife, Zaragoza
6	Almería, Badajoz, Córdoba, Gipuzkoa, Girona, Tarragona, Toledo
5	Cantabria, Castellón, Ciudad Real, Huelva, Jaén, Navarre, Valladolid
4	Álava, Albacete, Burgos, Cáceres, La Rioja, León, Lleida, Lugo, Ourense, Salamanca
3	Ávila, Cuenca, Guadalajara, Huesca, Palencia, Segovia, Teruel, Zamora
2	Soria

208 Senate seats were elected using open-list (Note: Parties could group candidates into lists, although each candidate was treated separately for the purpose of the voting procedure.) partial block voting: voters in constituencies electing four seats could choose up to three candidates; in those with two or three seats, up to two; and in single-member districts, one. Each of the 47 peninsular provinces was allocated four seats, while in insular provinces—such as the Balearic and Canary Islands—the districts were the islands themselves, with the larger ones (Mallorca, Gran Canaria and Tenerife) being allocated three seats each, and the smaller ones (Menorca, Ibiza–Formentera, Fuerteventura, La Gomera, El Hierro, Lanzarote and La Palma) one each. Ceuta and Melilla elected two seats each. Additionally, autonomous communities could appoint at least one senator each and were entitled to one additional seat per million inhabitants.

The law did not provide for by-elections to fill vacant seats; instead, any vacancies arising after the proclamation of candidates and during the legislative term were filled by the next candidates on the party lists or, when required, by designated substitutes.

=== Outgoing parliament ===
The tables below show the composition of the parliamentary groups in both chambers at the time of dissolution.

Parliamentary composition in September 2019
Congress of Deputies
Groups	Parties	Deputies	
Groups	Parties	Seats	Total
Socialist Parliamentary Group	PSOE	111	123
Socialist Parliamentary Group	PSC	12	123
People's Parliamentary Group in the Congress	PP	66	66
Citizens Parliamentary Group	Cs	57	57
United We Can–In Common We Can–Galicia in Common's Confederal Parliamentary Group	Podemos	32	42
United We Can–In Common We Can–Galicia in Common's Confederal Parliamentary Group	IU	5	42
United We Can–In Common We Can–Galicia in Common's Confederal Parliamentary Group	CatComú	4	42
United We Can–In Common We Can–Galicia in Common's Confederal Parliamentary Group	Equo	1	42
Vox Parliamentary Group	Vox	24	24
Republican Parliamentary Group	ERC	13	14
Republican Parliamentary Group	Sobiranistes	1	14
Basque Parliamentary Group (EAJ/PNV)	EAJ/PNV	6	6
Mixed Parliamentary Group	JxCat	7	18
Mixed Parliamentary Group	EH Bildu	4	18
Mixed Parliamentary Group	CCa	2	18
Mixed Parliamentary Group	UPN	2	18
Mixed Parliamentary Group	ERC	1 (Note: Oriol Junqueras had his Congress of Deputies membership suspended, and as a result was forced into the Mixed Group.)	18
Mixed Parliamentary Group	Compromís	1	18
Mixed Parliamentary Group	PRC	1	18

Parliamentary composition in September 2019
Senate (Note: 3 seats were vacant, pending regional appointments as a result of the 2019 Spanish regional elections.)
Groups	Parties	Senators	
Groups	Parties	Seats	Total
Socialist Parliamentary Group	PSOE	136	139
Socialist Parliamentary Group	PSC	3	139
People's Parliamentary Group in the Senate	PP	69	69
Republican Left–EH Bildu Parliamentary Group	ERC	12	14
Republican Left–EH Bildu Parliamentary Group	EH Bildu	2	14
Citizens Parliamentary Group	Cs	13	13
Basque Parliamentary Group in the Senate (EAJ/PNV)	EAJ/PNV	9	9
Confederal Left Parliamentary Group (Forward Andalusia, More for Majorca, Commitment, More Madrid and Catalonia in Common–We Can)	AA	1	6
Confederal Left Parliamentary Group (Forward Andalusia, More for Majorca, Commitment, More Madrid and Catalonia in Common–We Can)	Més	1	6
Confederal Left Parliamentary Group (Forward Andalusia, More for Majorca, Commitment, More Madrid and Catalonia in Common–We Can)	Más Madrid	1	6
Confederal Left Parliamentary Group (Forward Andalusia, More for Majorca, Commitment, More Madrid and Catalonia in Common–We Can)	Compromís	1	6
Confederal Left Parliamentary Group (Forward Andalusia, More for Majorca, Commitment, More Madrid and Catalonia in Common–We Can)	CatComú	1	6
Confederal Left Parliamentary Group (Forward Andalusia, More for Majorca, Commitment, More Madrid and Catalonia in Common–We Can)	GCE	1	6
Nationalist Parliamentary Group in the Senate; Together for Catalonia–Canarian Coalition/ Canarian Nationalist Party	JxCat	4	6
Nationalist Parliamentary Group in the Senate; Together for Catalonia–Canarian Coalition/ Canarian Nationalist Party	EAJ/PNV	1	6
Nationalist Parliamentary Group in the Senate; Together for Catalonia–Canarian Coalition/ Canarian Nationalist Party	CCa	1	6
Mixed Parliamentary Group	Vox	1	9
Mixed Parliamentary Group	ERC	1 (Note: Raül Romeva had his Senate membership suspended, and as a result was forced into the Mixed Group.)	9
Mixed Parliamentary Group	UPN	1	9
Mixed Parliamentary Group	PRC	1	9
Mixed Parliamentary Group	PAR	1	9
Mixed Parliamentary Group	ASG	1	9

== Candidates ==
=== Nomination rules ===
Spanish citizens with the right to vote could run for election, provided that they had not been criminally imprisoned by a final sentence or convicted—whether final or not—of offences that involved loss of eligibility or disqualification from public office (such as rebellion, terrorism or other crimes against the state). Additional causes of ineligibility applied to the following officials:

- Members of the Spanish royal family and their spouses;
- Holders of a number of senior public or institutional posts, including the heads and members of higher courts and state institutions; (Note: These comprised the Constitutional Court, the General Council of the Judiciary, the Supreme Court, the Council of State, the Court of Auditors and the Economic and Social Council.) the Ombudsman; the State's Attorney General; high-ranking officials of government departments, the Office of the Prime Minister and other state agencies; government delegates in the autonomous communities; the chair of RTVE; the director of the Electoral Register Office; the governor and deputy governor of the Bank of Spain; the heads of official credit institutions; and members of electoral commissions and of the Nuclear Safety Council;
- Heads of diplomatic missions abroad;
- Judges and public prosecutors in active service;
- Members of the Armed Forces and law enforcement bodies in active service.

Other ineligibility provisions also applied to a number of territorial officials in these categories within their areas of jurisdiction, as well as to employees of foreign states and members of regional governments.

Incompatibility rules included those of ineligibility, and also barred running in multiple constituencies or lists, holding office if the candidacy was later declared illegal (by a final ruling), and combining legislative roles (deputy, senator, and regional lawmaker) with each other or with:

- A number of senior public or institutional posts, including the presidency of the National Commission on Markets and Competition; and leadership positions in RTVE, government offices, public authorities (such as port authorities, hydrographic confederations, or highway concessionary companies), public entities and state-owned or publicly funded companies;
- Any other paid public or private position, except university teaching.

=== Parties and lists ===
The electoral law allowed for parties and federations registered in the interior ministry, alliances and groupings of electors to present lists of candidates. Parties and federations intending to form an alliance were required to inform the relevant electoral commission within 10 days of the election call, whereas groupings of electors needed to secure the signature of at least one percent of the electorate in the constituencies for which they sought election, disallowing electors from signing for more than one list. Concurrently, parties, federations or alliances that had not obtained a mandate in either chamber of the Cortes at the preceding election were required to secure the signature of at least 0.1 percent of electors in the aforementioned constituencies. Additionally, a balanced composition of men and women was required in the electoral lists, so that candidates of either sex made up at least 40 percent of the total composition.

A special, simplified process was provided for election re-runs, including a shortening of deadlines, electoral campaigning, the lifting of signature requirements if these had been already met for the immediately previous election and the possibility of maintaining lists and alliances without needing to go through pre-election procedures again.

Below is a list of the main parties and alliances which contested the election:

Candidacy	Parties and alliances	Leading candidate	Ideology	Previous result				Gov.	Ref.
Candidacy	Parties and alliances	Leading candidate	Ideology	Congress		Senate		Gov.	Ref.
Candidacy	Parties and alliances	Leading candidate	Ideology	Vote %	Seats	Vote %	Seats	Gov.	Ref.
PSOE	List: Spanish Socialist Workers' Party (PSOE); Socialists' Party of Catalonia (PSC)	Pedro Sánchez	Social democracy	28.7%	123	29.3%	123	Yes	
PP	List: People's Party (PP); Forum of Citizens (FAC)	Pablo Casado	Conservatism; Christian democracy	16.7%	66	19.2%	54	No	
Cs	List: Citizens–Party of the Citizenry (Cs); Union, Progress and Democracy (UPyD)	Albert Rivera	Liberalism	15.9%	57	14.9%	4	No	
Unidas; Podemos	List: We Can (Podemos); United Left (IU) – Communist Party of Spain (PCE) – The Dawn Marxist Organization (La Aurora (OM)) – Republican Left (IR) – Feminist Party of Spain (PFE) – Unitarian Candidacy of Workers (CUT); Assembly (Batzarre); Upper Aragon in Common (AltoAragón en Común); In Common We Can−Let's Win Change (ECP–Guanyem el Canvi) – Catalonia in Common (CatComú) – We Can (Podem); In Common–United We Can (Podemos–EU) – We Can (Podemos) – United Left (EU)	Pablo Iglesias	Left-wing populism Direct democracy Democratic socialism	14.3%	42	12.8%	0	No	
Vox	List: Vox (Vox)	Santiago Abascal	Right-wing populism Ultranationalism; National conservatism	10.3%	24	8.4%	0	No	
ERC– Sobiranistes	List: Republican Left of Catalonia (ERC); Sovereigntists (Sobiranistes); Republican Left of the Valencian Country (ERPV)	Gabriel Rufián	Catalan independence Left-wing nationalism Social democracy	3.9%	15	4.4%	11	No	
JxCat–Junts	List: Catalan European Democratic Party (PDeCAT); Together for Catalonia (JxCat) – National Call for the Republic (CNxR)	Laura Borràs	Catalan independence Liberalism	1.9%	7	2.1%	2	No	
EAJ/PNV	List: Basque Nationalist Party (EAJ/PNV)	Aitor Esteban	Basque nationalism Christian democracy	1.5%	6	1.6%	9	No	
EH Bildu	List: Basque Country Gather (EH Bildu) – Create (Sortu) – Basque Solidarity (EA) – Alternative (Alternatiba)	Mertxe Aizpurua (Note: EH Bildu did not field a single visible leader; instead, prominence was given to the lead candidate in each of the constituencies where it ran. Mertxe Aizpurua from Gipuzkoa was later selected as EH Bildu's spokesperson in Congress.)	Basque independence Abertzale left Socialism	1.0%	4	0.9%	1	No	
CCa– PNC–NC	List: Canarian Coalition (CCa); New Canaries (NCa); Canarian Nationalist Party (PNC); Independent Herrenian Group (AHI)	Ana Oramas	Regionalism; Canarian nationalism Centrism	0.7% (Note: Results for CCa–PNC (0.5%, 2 deputies) and NCa (0.1%, 0 deputies) in the April 2019 Congress election.)	2	0.4% (Note: Results for CCa–PNC (0.3%, 0 senators) and NCa (0.1%, 0 senators) in the April 2019 Senate election.)	0	No	
NA+	List: Navarrese People's Union (UPN); People's Party (PP); Citizens–Party of the Citizenry (Cs)	Sergio Sayas	Regionalism; Christian democracy Conservatism; Liberalism	0.4%	2	0.5%	3	No	
PRC	List: Regionalist Party of Cantabria (PRC)	José María Mazón	Regionalism; Centrism	0.2%	1	0.2%	0	No	
BNG	List: Galician Nationalist Bloc (BNG) – Galician People's Union (UPG) – Galician Movement for Socialism (MGS) – Abrente–Galician Democratic Left (Abrente–EDG) – Galician Workers' Front (FOGA)	Néstor Rego	Galician nationalism Left-wing nationalism Socialism	0.4%	0	0.5%	0	No	
ASG	List: Gomera Socialist Group (ASG)	Fabián Chinea	Insularism; Social democracy	Did not contest		0.0%	1	No	
Más País	List: More Country (Más País); Equo (Equo); Aragonese Union (CHA); More Commitment (Més Compromís) – Commitment Coalition (Compromís) – More Country (Más País)	Íñigo Errejón	Green politics Direct democracy Alter-globalization	Did not contest (Note: Compromís (1 deputy and 0 senators) joined the Més Compromís alliance ahead of the November 2019 election.)				No	
CUP–PR	List: Popular Unity Candidacy (CUP) – Forward–Socialist Organization of National Liberation (Endavant–OSAN) – Free People (PL–PPCC) – Internationalist Struggle (LI–CI); Let's Reverse (Capgirem); Pirates of Catalonia (Pirata.cat)	Mireia Vehí	Catalan independence Anti-capitalism; Socialism	Did not contest				No	
¡TE!	List: Teruel Exists (¡TE!)	Tomás Guitarte	Regionalism	Did not contest				No	

Former Podemos founder Íñigo Errejón launched the Más País platform on 25 September, in an attempt to prevent dissatisfaction from centre-left voters—over the failure in the government formation process between the Spanish Socialist Workers' Party (PSOE) and Unidas Podemos (UP)—to translate into higher abstention rates. The party avoided running in smaller constituencies, where it would be unlikely to win any seat but could contribute to other left-of-centre parties (mainly PSOE and UP) losing their own seats due to vote splitting. Más País signed alliances with Equo, Coalició Compromís and Chunta Aragonesista.

== Campaign ==
=== Timetable ===
The November 2019 Spanish general election was the first to apply the new electoral procedures introduced for election re-runs as a result of the experience of the 2015–2016 political deadlock leading to the June 2016 election. This consisted of a special, simplified process, including a shortening of deadlines, electoral campaigning, the lifting of signature requirements if these had been already met for the immediately previous election and the possibility of maintaining lists and coalitions without needing to go through the same pre-election procedures again. The key dates are listed below (all times are CET. The Canary Islands used WET (UTC+0) instead):

- 24 September: The election decree is issued with the countersign of the president of the Congress of Deputies, ratified by the King; formal dissolution of parliament and start of prohibition period on the inauguration of public works, services or projects.
- 25 September: Constitution of provincial and zone electoral commissions, with the same compositions as those in force for the previous election.
- 30 September: Division of constituencies into polling sections and stations; deadline for parties and federations to report on their electoral alliances.
- 7 October: Deadline for electoral register consultation for the purpose of possible corrections; deadline for parties, federations, alliances, and groupings of electors to present or maintain electoral lists.
- 9 October: Publication of submitted electoral lists in the Official State Gazette (BOE).
- 14 October: Official proclamation of validly submitted electoral lists.
- 15 October: Publication of proclaimed electoral lists in the BOE.
- 19 October: Deadline for non-resident citizens (electors residing abroad (CERA) and citizens temporarily absent from Spain) to apply for voting.
- 23 October: Deadline for the selection of polling station members by sortition.
- 31 October: Deadline to apply for postal voting.
- 1 November: Official start of electoral campaigning.
- 5 November: Start of legal ban on electoral opinion polling publication; deadline for CERA citizens to vote by mail.
- 6 November: Deadline for postal and temporarily absent voting (extended to 8 November by the Central Electoral Commission).
- 8 November: Last day of electoral campaigning; deadline for CERA voting.
- 9 November: Official election silence ("reflection day").
- 10 November: Election day (polling stations open at 9 am and close at 8 pm or once voters present in a queue at/outside the polling station at 8 pm have cast their vote); provisional vote counting.
- 13 November: Start of general vote counting, including CERA votes.
- 16 November: Deadline for the general vote counting.
- 25 November: Deadline for the proclamation of elected members.
- 5 December: Deadline for the reconvening of parliament (date determined by the election decree, which for the November 2019 election was set for 3 December).
- 4 January: Deadline for the publication of definitive election results in the BOE.

=== Party slogans ===
Party or alliance	Original slogan	English translation	Ref.
PSOE	« Ahora Gobierno. Ahora España » « Ahora sí »	"Government now. Spain now" "Yes now"	
PP	« Por todo lo que nos une »	"For everything that unites us"	
Cs	« España en marcha »	"Spain underway"	
Unidas Podemos: ECP; En Común	Main: « Un Gobierno contigo » ECP: « Si vols solucions, vota solucions » En Común: « Conta con nós »	Main: "A Government with you" ECP: "If you want solutions, vote solutions" En Común: "Count with us"	
Vox	« España siempre »	"Always Spain"	
ERC–Sobiranistes	« Tornarem més forts »	"We shall return stronger"	
JxCat–Junts	« Per la independència, ni un vot enrere »	"For independence, not a vote back"	
EAJ/PNV	« Hemen, EAJ-PNV »	"Here, EAJ/PNV"	
EH Bildu	« Erabaki Baietz! »	"Decide Yes!"	
CCa–PNC–NC	« Hagamos más fuerte a Canarias »	"Let's make the Canaries stronger"	
NA+	« Navarra, clave en España »	"Navarra, key in Spain"	
BNG	« Facer valer Galiza con voz propia »	"Enforce Galicia with our own voice"	
Más País: Més Compromís	Main: « Desbloquear, avanzar, Más País » Més Compromís: « Acordar, la política útil »	Main: "Unblock, make progress, More Country"; Més Compromís: "Agreeing, the useful policy"	
CUP–PR	« Ingovernables »	"Ungovernable"	

=== Events and issues ===
The pre-campaign period saw the rise of a new left-wing electoral platform, Más País, founded by former Podemos co-founder Íñigo Errejón around his Más Madrid platform, following the failure of the left to agree on a government following the April election. Más País was joined by several other parties, such as Coalició Compromís, Chunta Aragonesista and Equo, the latter of which voted for breaking up its coalition with Unidas Podemos in order to join Errejón's platform. The leadership of Podemos in the Region of Murcia also went on to joint Más País. The platform went on to poll at 6% as soon as it was formed.

On 24 September, the Spanish Supreme Court ruled in favor of the PSOE's plan to remove the remnants of Francisco Franco from the Valle de los Caídos, a key policy of Pedro Sánchez during the previous legislature. The prior of the Valle de los Caídos' abbey, Santiago Cantera, initially announced his intention to disregard the Supreme Court's ruling and not authorize Franco's exhumation; however, the Spanish government closed down the monument to the public on 11 October in order to prepare for the exhumation—finally scheduled for 22 October at latest, so for the removal to be over by 25 October—to uphold the Supreme Court's ruling.

On 13 October, the leaders of the Catalan independence movement involved in the events of October 2017 were sentenced by the Supreme Court for sedition and embezzlement to convictions ranging from 9 to 13 years in jail. The ruling unleashed a wave of violent protests throughout Catalonia, and particularly in Barcelona, throughout the ensuing days.

=== Debates ===
November 2019 Spanish general election debates
Date	Organizer(s)	Moderator(s)	P Present (Note: Denotes a main invitee attending the event.) S Surrogate (Note: Denotes a main invitee not attending the event, sending a surrogate in their place.) NI Not invited I Invited A Absent invitee									
Date	Organizer(s)	Moderator(s)	PSOE	PP	Cs	UP	Vox	ERC	JxCat	PNV	Audience	Ref.
1 November	RTVE (Note: Parliamentary spokespersons' debate.)	Xabier Fortes	P Lastra	P A. de Toledo	P Arrimadas	P I. Montero	P Espinosa	P Rufián	NI	P Esteban	17.7% (2,468,000)	
2 November	laSexta (La Sexta Noche)	Iñaki López	S Sicilia	S Gamarra	S Rodríguez	S Vera	S O. Smith	P Rufián	S Borràs	P Esteban	8.5% (865,000)	
4 November	ATV	Ana Blanco; Vicente Vallés	P Sánchez	P Casado	P Rivera	P Iglesias	P Abascal	NI	NI	NI	52.7% (8,621,000)	
7 November	laSexta (Note: "Women's debate".)	Ana Pastor	P M. Montero	P Pastor	P Arrimadas	P I. Montero	P Monasterio	NI	NI	NI	19.2% (3,133,000)	

Opinion polls

Candidate viewed as "performing best" or "most convincing" in each debate
Debate	Polling firm/Commissioner	Sample	PSOE	PP	Cs	UP	Vox	ERC	PNV	Tie	None	Question
1 November	SocioMétrica/El Español	2,965	14.3	17.6	19.4	16.6	18.5	6.0	3.7	–	–	3.9
4 November	ElectoPanel/Electomanía	?	9.7	7.5	14.8	34.3	33.8	–	–	–	–	–
4 November	Sigma Dos/Antena 3	4,000	20.0	21.5	10.8	29.5	18.2	–	–	–	–	–
4 November	InvyMark/laSexta	?	32.3	17.4	12.8	15.5	13.8	–	–	–	–	8.2
4 November	SocioMétrica/El Español	4,678	20.0	26.3	13.3	15.0	21.8	–	–	–	–	3.6
4 November	Ipsos/Henneo	?	24.0	9.0	6.0	32.0	29.0	–	–	–	–	–
4 November	NC Report/La Razón	?	22.8	25.1	10.1	24.3	17.7	–	–	–	–	–
4 November	CIS	4,800	15.3	9.4	4.2	23.3	14.7	–	–	3.4	23.7	6.1

== Opinion polls ==
Local regression trend line of poll results from 28 April 2019 to 10 November 2019, with each line corresponding to a political party.

== Voter turnout ==
The table below shows registered voter turnout during the election. Figures for election day do not include non-resident citizens, while final figures do.

Region	Time (Election day)									Final		
Region	14:00			18:00			20:00			Final		
Region	28A	10N	+/–	28A	10N	+/–	28A	10N	+/–	28A	10N	+/–
Andalusia	38.94%	35.80%	−3.14	57.23%	54.84%	−2.39	73.30%	68.23%	−5.07	70.78%	65.91%	−4.87
Aragon	44.65%	41.18%	−3.47	62.30%	57.88%	−4.42	77.62%	71.50%	−6.12	75.20%	69.34%	−5.86
Asturias	40.15%	34.42%	−5.73	58.67%	53.50%	−5.17	73.35%	65.47%	−7.88	65.02%	58.12%	−6.90
Balearic Islands	38.10%	30.95%	−7.15	54.42%	47.40%	−7.02	67.56%	58.71%	−8.85	65.37%	56.81%	−8.56
Basque Country	41.75%	40.18%	−1.57	60.05%	57.60%	−2.45	74.52%	68.93%	−5.59	71.78%	66.43%	−5.35
Canary Islands	30.72%	27.07%	−3.65	51.00%	44.36%	−6.64	68.15%	60.47%	−7.68	62.46%	55.44%	−7.02
Cantabria	43.12%	39.12%	−4.00	63.64%	59.28%	−4.36	78.00%	70.83%	−7.17	72.38%	65.74%	−6.64
Castile and León	41.80%	37.29%	−4.51	61.99%	56.70%	−5.29	78.16%	71.36%	−6.80	72.87%	66.61%	−6.26
Castilla–La Mancha	42.71%	38.07%	−4.64	62.35%	57.44%	−4.91	78.02%	71.38%	−6.64	76.57%	70.06%	−6.51
Catalonia	43.52%	40.58%	−2.94	64.20%	59.88%	−4.32	77.57%	72.14%	−5.43	74.57%	69.40%	−5.17
Extremadura	42.86%	37.17%	−5.69	60.21%	54.41%	−5.80	76.31%	69.12%	−7.19	74.17%	67.22%	−6.95
Galicia	36.97%	31.96%	−5.01	58.91%	53.24%	−5.67	73.97%	66.62%	−7.35	61.87%	55.86%	−6.01
La Rioja	44.67%	40.42%	−4.25	61.51%	57.45%	−4.06	78.12%	71.27%	−6.85	73.38%	66.96%	−6.42
Madrid	43.61%	40.98%	−2.63	65.10%	61.50%	−3.60	79.76%	74.55%	−5.21	75.46%	70.59%	−4.87
Murcia	43.41%	39.01%	−4.40	61.75%	57.89%	−3.86	75.69%	69.99%	−5.70	73.53%	68.03%	−5.50
Navarre	43.79%	39.38%	−4.41	60.89%	56.46%	−4.43	76.32%	69.30%	−7.02	72.53%	65.91%	−6.62
Valencian Community	45.87%	42.51%	−3.36	61.64%	59.97%	−1.67	76.33%	71.71%	−4.62	74.29%	69.80%	−4.49
Ceuta	30.47%	27.27%	−3.20	48.84%	43.77%	−5.07	63.97%	56.19%	−7.78	61.44%	53.98%	−7.46
Melilla	28.14%	24.61%	−3.53	45.44%	38.98%	−6.46	62.94%	57.12%	−5.82	57.53%	52.39%	−5.14
Total	41.49%	37.92%	–3.57	60.74%	56.85%	–3.89	75.75%	69.86%	–5.89	71.76%	66.23%	–5.53

== Results ==
=== Congress of Deputies ===
← Summary of the 10 November 2019 Congress of Deputies election results →
Parties and alliances	Popular vote			Seats	
Parties and alliances	Votes	%	±pp	Total	+/−
Spanish Socialist Workers' Party (PSOE)	6,792,199	28.00	−0.67	120	−3
People's Party (PP)	5,047,040	20.81	+4.12	89	+23
Vox (Vox)	3,656,979	15.08	+4.82	52	+28
United We Can (Unidas Podemos)	3,119,364	12.86	−1.46	35	−7
United We Can (Podemos–IU)	2,381,960	9.82	−1.24	26	−7
In Common We Can–Let's Win the Change (ECP–Guanyem el Canvi)	549,173	2.26	−0.09	7	±0
In Common–United We Can (Podemos–EU)	188,231	0.78	−0.13	2	±0
Citizens–Party of the Citizenry (Cs)	1,650,318	6.80	−9.06	10	−47
Republican Left of Catalonia–Sovereigntists (ERC–Sobiranistes)	880,734	3.63	−0.28	13	−2
Republican Left of Catalonia–Sovereigntists (ERC–Sobiranistes)	874,859	3.61	−0.28	13	−2
Republican Left of the Valencian Country (ERPV)	5,875	0.02	±0.00	0	±0
More Country (Más País)	582,306	2.40	New	3	+2
More Country–Equo (Más País–Equo)	330,345	1.36	New	2	+2
More Commitment (Més Compromís)^{1}	176,287	0.73	+0.07	1	±0
More Country (Más País)	52,478	0.22	New	0	±0
More Country–Aragonese Union–Equo (Más País–CHA–Equo)	23,196	0.10	New	0	±0
Together for Catalonia–Together (JxCat–Junts)	530,225	2.19	+0.28	8	+1
Basque Nationalist Party (EAJ/PNV)	379,002	1.56	+0.05	6	±0
Basque Country Gather (EH Bildu)	277,621	1.14	+0.15	5	+1
Popular Unity Candidacy–For Rupture (CUP–PR)	246,971	1.02	New	2	+2
Animalist Party Against Mistreatment of Animals (PACMA)	228,856	0.94	−0.31	0	±0
Canarian Coalition–New Canaries (CCa–PNC–NC)^{2}	124,289	0.51	−0.15	2	±0
Galician Nationalist Bloc (BNG)	120,456	0.50	+0.14	1	+1
Sum Navarre (NA+)	99,078	0.41	±0.00	2	±0
Regionalist Party of Cantabria (PRC)	68,830	0.28	+0.08	1	±0
Zero Cuts–Green Group (Recortes Cero–GV)	35,042	0.14	−0.04	0	±0
For a Fairer World (PUM+J)	27,272	0.11	+0.03	0	±0
Teruel Exists (¡TE!)	19,761	0.08	New	1	+1
More Left (Més–MxMe–esquerra)^{3}	18,295	0.08	−0.02	0	±0
Andalusia by Herself (AxSí)	14,046	0.06	+0.02	0	±0
Communist Party of the Peoples of Spain (PCPE)	13,828	0.06	−0.01	0	±0
Communist Party of the Workers of Spain (PCTE)	13,029	0.05	±0.00	0	±0
Yes to the Future (GBai)	12,709	0.05	−0.04	0	±0
Leonese People's Union (UPL)	10,243	0.04	New	0	±0
Spanish Communist Workers' Party (PCOE)	9,725	0.04	+0.01	0	±0
Coalition for Melilla (CpM)	8,955	0.04	+0.01	0	±0
Blank Seats (EB)	5,970	0.02	−0.01	0	±0
For Ávila (XAV)	5,416	0.02	New	0	±0
Forward–The Greens (Avant/Adelante–LV)	5,416	0.02	−0.01	0	±0
The Greens (Verdes)	3,287	0.01	New	0	±0
Humanist Party (PH)	3,150	0.01	−0.01	0	±0
Feminist Initiative (IFem)	3,005	0.01	New	0	±0
We Are Valencian in Movement (UiG–Som–CUIDES)	2,339	0.01	−0.01	0	±0
We Are Region (Somos Región)	2,328	0.01	−0.01	0	±0
Left in Positive (IZQP)	2,325	0.01	±0.00	0	±0
Canaries Now (ANC–UP)	2,032	0.01	±0.00	0	±0
With You, We Are Democracy (Contigo)	2,015	0.01	New	0	±0
Aragonese Union (CHA)	2,000	0.01	New	0	±0
Sorian People's Platform (PPSO)	1,466	0.01	±0.00	0	±0
United Extremadura (EU)	1,347	0.01	New	0	±0
European Retirees Social Democratic Party (PDSJE)	1,259	0.01	+0.01	0	±0
Libertarian Party (P–LIB)	1,171	0.00	±0.00	0	±0
Social Aragonese Movement (MAS)	1,068	0.00	New	0	±0
United–Acting for Democracy (Unidos SI–ACPS–DEf)	1,067	0.00	New	0	±0
Regionalist Party of the Leonese Country (PREPAL)	941	0.00	−0.01	0	±0
Andecha Astur (Andecha)	887	0.00	±0.00	0	±0
Movement for Dignity and Citizenship (MDyC)	819	0.00	New	0	±0
Puyalón (PYLN)	630	0.00	±0.00	0	±0
Spanish Phalanx of the CNSO (FE de las JONS)	616	0.00	±0.00	0	±0
At Once Valencian Community (aUna CV)	585	0.00	New	0	±0
Regionalist Union of Castile and León (Unión Regionalista)	530	0.00	±0.00	0	±0
Andalusian Convergence (CAnda)	520	0.00	New	0	±0
Federation of Independents of Aragon (FIA)	461	0.00	±0.00	0	±0
European Solidarity Action Party (Solidaria)	270	0.00	±0.00	0	±0
Andalusian Solidary Independent Republican Party (RISA)	249	0.00	±0.00	0	±0
Centered (centrados)	234	0.00	±0.00	0	±0
Plural Democracy (DPL)	214	0.00	±0.00	0	±0
Revolutionary Anticapitalist Left (IZAR)	113	0.00	±0.00	0	±0
XXI Convergence (C21)	72	0.00	±0.00	0	±0
Union of Everyone (UdT)	26	0.00	±0.00	0	±0
Blank ballots	217,227	0.90	+0.14		
Total	24,258,228			350	±0
Valid votes	24,258,228	98.98	+0.03		
Invalid votes	249,487	1.02	−0.03		
Votes cast / turnout	24,507,715	66.23	−5.53		
Abstentions	12,493,664	33.77	+5.53		
Registered voters	37,001,379				
Sources
Footnotes: ^{1} More Commitment results are compared to Commitment: Bloc–Initiative–Greens Equo totals in the April 2019 election.; ^{2} Canarian Coalition–New Canaries results are compared to the combined totals of Canarian Coalition–Canarian Nationalist Party and New Canaries in the April 2019 election.; ^{3} More Left results are compared to Progressive Voices totals in the April 2019 election.

Popular vote
PSOE	28.00%
PP	20.81%
Vox	15.08%
Unidas Podemos	12.86%
Cs	6.80%
ERC–Sob.	3.63%
Más País	2.40%
JxCat–Junts	2.19%
EAJ/PNV	1.56%
EH Bildu	1.14%
CUP–PR	1.02%
CCa–PNC–NC	0.51%
BNG	0.50%
NA+	0.41%
PRC	0.28%
¡TE!	0.08%
Others	2.73%
Blank ballots	0.90%

Seats
PSOE	34.29%
PP	25.43%
Vox	14.86%
Unidas Podemos	10.00%
ERC–Sob.	3.71%
Cs	2.86%
JxCat–Junts	2.29%
EAJ/PNV	1.71%
EH Bildu	1.43%
Más País	0.86%
CUP–PR	0.57%
CCa–PNC–NC	0.57%
NA+	0.57%
BNG	0.29%
PRC	0.29%
¡TE!	0.29%

=== Senate ===
← Summary of the 10 November 2019 Senate of Spain election results →
Parties and alliances	Popular vote			Seats	
Parties and alliances	Votes	%	±pp	Total	+/−
Spanish Socialist Workers' Party (PSOE)	19,481,846	30.62	+1.29	93	−30
People's Party (PP)	17,074,301	26.84	+7.68	83	+29
United We Can (Unidas Podemos)	7,884,444	12.39	−0.38	0	±0
United We Can (Podemos–IU)	5,993,304	9.42	−0.25	0	±0
In Common We Can–Let's Win the Change (ECP–Guanyem el Canvi)	1,440,373	2.26	+0.15	0	±0
In Common–United We Can (Podemos–EU)	450,767	0.71	−0.03	0	±0
Citizens–Party of the Citizenry (Cs)	4,951,350	7.78	−7.07	0	−4
Vox (Vox)	3,229,631	5.08	−3.27	2	+2
Republican Left of Catalonia–Sovereigntists (ERC–Sobiranistes)	3,054,285	4.80	+0.41	11	±0
Republican Left of Catalonia–Sovereigntists (ERC–Sobiranistes)	3,040,779	4.78	+0.40	11	±0
Republican Left of the Valencian Country (ERPV)	11,894	0.02	+0.01	0	±0
Republican Left (esquerra)^{1}	1,612	0.00	±0.00	0	±0
Together for Catalonia–Together (JxCat–Junts)	1,689,482	2.66	+0.53	3	+1
Basque Nationalist Party (EAJ/PNV)	1,152,440	1.81	+0.16	9	±0
Animalist Party Against Mistreatment of Animals (PACMA)	977,844	1.54	−0.30	0	±0
More Country (Más País)	960,287	1.51	New	0	±0
More Commitment (Més Compromís)^{2}	474,607	0.75	−0.05	0	±0
More Country–Equo (Más País–Equo)	384,728	0.60	New	0	±0
More Country–Aragonese Union–Equo (Más País–CHA–Equo)	51,532	0.08	New	0	±0
More Country (Más País)	49,420	0.08	New	0	±0
Basque Country Gather (EH Bildu)	842,993	1.33	+0.43	1	±0
Galician Nationalist Bloc (BNG)	411,948	0.65	+0.18	0	±0
Sum Navarre (NA+)	309,357	0.49	+0.04	3	±0
Canarian Coalition–New Canaries (CCa–PNC–NC)^{3}	220,299	0.35	−0.09	0	±0
Regionalist Party of Cantabria (PRC)	176,740	0.28	+0.06	0	±0
Zero Cuts–Green Group (Recortes Cero–GV)	128,201	0.20	−0.04	0	±0
For a Fairer World (PUM+J)	70,514	0.11	+0.02	0	±0
Communist Party of the Peoples of Spain (PCPE)	69,326	0.11	+0.04	0	±0
Teruel Exists (¡TE!)	57,340	0.09	New	2	+2
Yes to the Future (GBai)^{4}	52,076	0.08	n/a	0	±0
Andalusia by Herself (AxSí)	50,663	0.08	+0.02	0	±0
Leonese People's Union (UPL)	41,773	0.07	New	0	±0
More Left (Més–esquerra)	37,727	0.06	New	0	±0
Humanist Party (PH)	28,052	0.04	+0.01	0	±0
Blank Seats (EB)	26,258	0.04	±0.00	0	±0
Communist Party of the Workers of Spain (PCTE)	22,767	0.04	+0.01	0	±0
For Ávila (XAV)	21,340	0.03	New	0	±0
Coalition for Melilla (CpM)	17,427	0.03	+0.01	0	±0
Feminist Initiative (IFem)	14,139	0.02	New	0	±0
Forward–The Greens (Avant/Adelante–LV)	13,099	0.02	−0.01	0	±0
We Are Region (Somos Región)	12,888	0.02	−0.01	0	±0
Aragonese Union (CHA)	7,622	0.01	New	0	±0
We Are Valencian in Movement (UiG–Som–CUIDES)	7,058	0.01	±0.00	0	±0
United Extremadura (EU)	7,021	0.01	New	0	±0
Sorian People's Platform (PPSO)	7,015	0.01	±0.00	0	±0
Regionalist Party of the Leonese Country (PREPAL)	6,350	0.01	−0.01	0	±0
Canaries Now (ANC–UP)	6,196	0.01	±0.00	0	±0
Left in Positive (IZQP)	4,786	0.01	±0.00	0	±0
Andecha Astur (Andecha)	4,518	0.01	±0.00	0	±0
With You, We Are Democracy (Contigo)	4,276	0.01	New	0	±0
Spanish Phalanx of the CNSO (FE de las JONS)	4,179	0.01	+0.01	0	±0
Gomera Socialist Group (ASG)	3,628	0.01	±0.00	1	±0
More for Menorca (MxMe)	3,310	0.01	±0.00	0	±0
Libertarian Party (P–LIB)	2,331	0.01	+0.01	0	±0
Federation of Independents of Aragon (FIA)	2,327	0.00	−0.01	0	±0
Regionalist Union of Castile and León (Unión Regionalista)	2,307	0.00	±0.00	0	±0
The Greens (Verdes)	1,862	0.00	New	0	±0
European Retirees Social Democratic Party (PDSJE)	1,557	0.00	New	0	±0
Social Aragonese Movement (MAS)	1,514	0.00	New	0	±0
Aragonese Land (TA)	1,509	0.00	New	0	±0
Movement for Dignity and Citizenship (MDyC)	1,439	0.00	New	0	±0
Puyalón (PYLN)	1,373	0.00	±0.00	0	±0
At Once Valencian Community (aUna CV)	1,115	0.00	New	0	±0
European Solidarity Action Party (Solidaria)	974	0.00	±0.00	0	±0
Andalusian Solidary Independent Republican Party (RISA)	855	0.00	±0.00	0	±0
Centered (centrados)	734	0.00	±0.00	0	±0
Plural Democracy (DPL)	428	0.00	±0.00	0	±0
United–Acting for Democracy (Unidos SI–ACPS–DEf)	401	0.00	New	0	±0
XXI Convergence (C21)	257	0.00	±0.00	0	±0
Union of Everyone (UdT)	79	0.00	New	0	±0
Blank ballots (Note: The percentage of blank ballots is calculated over the official number of valid votes cast, irrespective of the total number of votes shown as a result of adding up the individual results for each party.)	451,449	1.89	+0.18		
Total	63,619,307			208	±0
Valid votes	23,825,576	97.70	−0.28		
Invalid votes	561,601	2.30	+0.28		
Votes cast / turnout	24,387,177	65.91	−5.41		
Abstentions	12,614,202	34.09	+5.41		
Registered voters	37,001,379				
Sources
Footnotes: ^{1} Republican Left results are compared to Now Ibiza and Formentera totals in the April 2019 election.; ^{2} More Commitment results are compared to Commitment: Bloc–Initiative–Greens Equo totals in the April 2019 election.; ^{3} Canarian Coalition–New Canaries results are compared to the combined totals of Canarian Coalition–Canarian Nationalist Party and New Canaries in the April 2019 election.; ^{4} Within the Change alliance in the April 2019 election.

Popular vote
PSOE	30.62%
PP	26.84%
Unidas Podemos	12.39%
Cs	7.78%
Vox	5.08%
ERC–Sob.	4.80%
JxCat–Junts	2.66%
EAJ/PNV	1.81%
PACMA	1.54%
Más País	1.51%
EH Bildu	1.33%
NA+	0.49%
¡TE!	0.09%
ASG	0.01%
Others	2.36%
Blank ballots	1.89%

Seats
PSOE	44.71%
PP	39.90%
ERC–Sob.	5.29%
EAJ/PNV	4.33%
JxCat–Junts	1.44%
NA+	1.44%
Vox	0.96%
¡TE!	0.96%
EH Bildu	0.48%
ASG	0.48%

=== Maps ===
Election results by constituency (Congress).

Vote winner strength by constituency (Congress).

Vote winner strength by autonomous community (Congress).

== Aftermath ==
=== Reactions ===
On 11 November, the day after the election, Albert Rivera resigned as leader of Citizens (Cs) after the party lost over 80% of its seats in the Congress and one-third of its seats in the Senate (mainly to Vox and the PP), and announced his intention to give up the Congress seat to which he had been elected, and retire from politics entirely. The PP recovered around one-third of the seats it had lost in the Congress in the April 2019 election, and almost half of the Senate seats it had lost on that occasion. The right-wing nationalist Vox party saw its seats in the Congress more than double, and it won its first directly elected Senate seats. Más País gained two seats in the Congress from Madrid (one from the PSOE and one from Podemos), while the leftist and Catalan nationalist Popular Unity Candidacy (CUP) gained its first seats in the national legislature after choosing to participate at the national level for the first time.

=== Government formation ===
On 7 January 2020, Pedro Sánchez was confirmed as prime minister by the Congress of Deputies.

Investiture; Congress of Deputies; Nomination of Pedro Sánchez (PSOE)
Ballot →	5 January 2020	7 January 2020
Required majority →	176 out of 350	Simple
Yes: • PSOE (120); • UP–ECP–GeC (35) (34 on 5 Jan); • PNV (6); • Más País (2); • Compromís (1); • NCa (1); • BNG (1); • ¡TE! (1)	166 / 350	167 / 350
No: • PP (88); • Vox (52); • Cs (10); • JxCat (8); • CUP (2); • UPN (2); • CCa (1); • PRC (1); • FAC (1)	165 / 350	165 / 350
Abstentions: • ERC (13); • EH Bildu (5)	18 / 350	18 / 350
Absentees: • UP–ECP–GeC (1) (on 5 Jan)	1 / 350	0 / 350

=== 2020 motion of no confidence ===
Motion of no confidence Congress of Deputies; Nomination of Santiago Abascal (Vox)
Ballot →	22 October 2020
Required majority →	176 out of 350
Yes: • Vox (52)	52 / 350
No: • PSOE (120); • PP (88); • UP–ECP–GeC (35); • ERC (13); • Cs (10); • PNV (6); • EH Bildu (5); • Junts (4); • PDeCAT (4); • Más País (2); • CUP (2); • UPN (2); • Compromís (1); • CCa (1); • NCa (1); • BNG (1); • PRC (1); • FAC (1); • ¡TE! (1)	298 / 350
Abstentions	0 / 350
Absentees	0 / 350

=== 2023 motion of no confidence ===
In February 2023, Ramón Tamames, a former member of the Communist Party of Spain (PCE), aged 89 at that moment, put himself forward to be an independent candidate for prime minister if a Vox-proposed motion of no confidence were successful. The motion failed on 22 March with 52 votes in favour (Vox plus one independent), 91 abstentions (People's Party plus one independent) and 201 votes against.

Motion of no confidence Congress of Deputies; Nomination of Ramón Tamames (INDEP)
Ballot →	22 March 2023
Required majority →	175 out of 349 (Note: Due to the vacancy of Unidas Podemos MP Alberto Rodríguez's seat, the effective absolute majority was at 175.)
Yes: • Vox (52); • INDEP (1)	53 / 350
No: • PSOE (120); • UP–ECP–GeC (30); • ERC (13); • CS (9); • PNV (6); • EH Bildu (4); • JxCat (4); • PDeCAT (4); • Más País (2); • CUP (2); • CCa (2); • Compromís (1); • BNG (1); • PRC (1); • TE (1); • INDEP (1)	201 / 350
Abstentions: • PP (88); • PN (2); • Foro (1)	91 / 350
Absentees: • UP–ECP–GeC (3); • EH Bildu (1)	4 / 350

== Bibliography ==
Legislation

- Constitución Española (Constitution). Official State Gazette (in Spanish). 27 December 1978 [version as of 27 September 2011]. BOE-A-1978-31229.
- Ley Orgánica 5/1985, de 19 de junio, del Régimen Electoral General (Organic Law 5/1985). Official State Gazette (in Spanish). 19 June 1985 [version as of 25 June 2019]. BOE-A-1985-11672.
- Real Decreto 551/2019, de 24 de septiembre, de disolución del Congreso de los Diputados y del Senado y de convocatoria de elecciones (Royal Decree 551/2019). Official State Gazette (in Spanish). 24 September 2019. BOE-A-2019-13558.

Other

- Carreras de Odriozola, Albert; Tafunell Sambola, Xavier (2005) [1989]. Estadísticas históricas de España, siglos XIX-XX (PDF) (in Spanish). Vol. 1 (II ed.). Bilbao: Fundación BBVA. pp. 1072–1097. ISBN 84-96515-00-1. Archived from the original (PDF) on 24 September 2015.
- Rodon, Toni (2020). "The Spanish electoral cycle of 2019: a tale of two countries". West European Politics. 43 (7): 1490–1512. doi:10.1080/01402382.2020.1761689. ISSN 0140-2382. S2CID 219424822.
