= Government of the Canary Islands =

Government of the autonomous community of the Canary Islands (Spain)

- Gobierno de Canarias

Overview
- Established: 1982
- Polity: Canary Islands
- Leader: President
- Appointed by: King of Spain
- Responsible to: Parliament of the Canary Islands
- Headquarters: Santa Cruz de Tenerife and Las Palmas de Gran Canaria
- Website: www.gobiernodecanarias.org

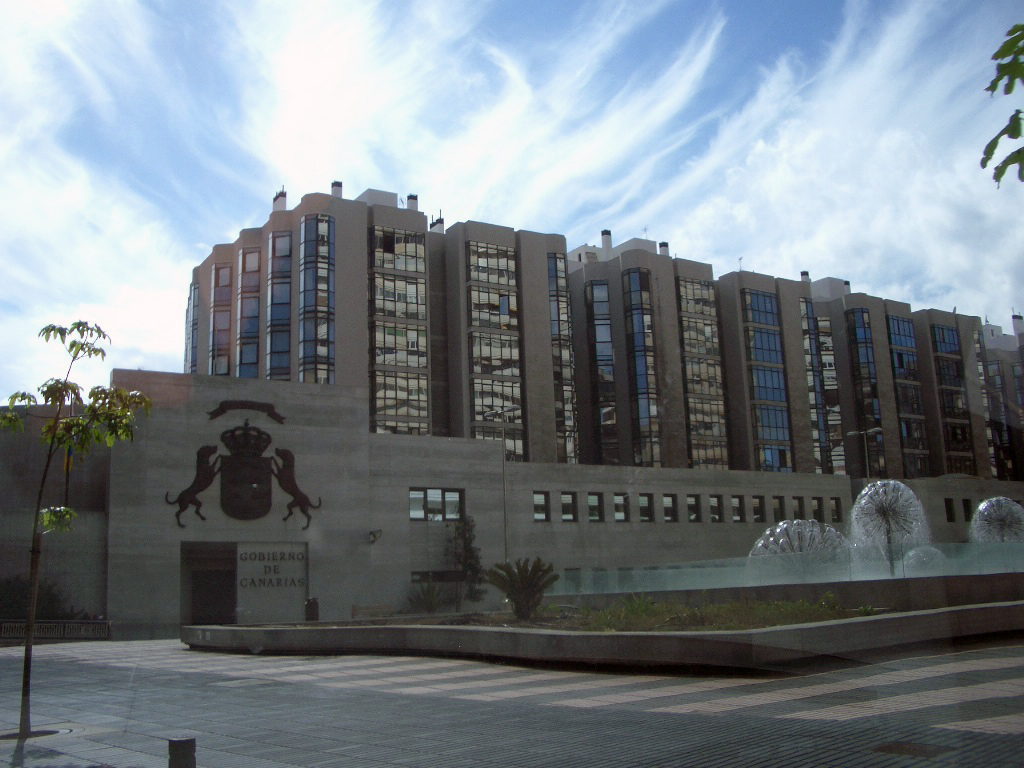
The government headquarters in Las Palmas de Gran Canaria

The Government of the Canary Islands (Spanish: Gobierno de Canarias) is the institution that holds the executive power within the competence framework of the autonomous community of the Canary Islands, in Spain, conferred by the Statute of Autonomy of the Canary Islands.

The Statute of Autonomy of the Canary Islands (approved by Organic Law 10/1982, of August 10, amended by Organic Law 4/1996, of December 30) is the institutional norm that constitutes the Autonomous Community of the Canary Islands, providing it with its framework basic organizational and functional At the administrative top —and as an exponent of the autonomous executive power— is the Government of the Canary Islands.

The Government of the Canary Islands has its main headquarters in Santa Cruz de Tenerife and Las Palmas de Gran Canaria.

The current autonomous regime of the Canary Islands arises as a result of the representative democratic system established in Spain with the entry into force of the Spanish Constitution of 1978 on December 28.
