= April 2019 Spanish general election =

- 28 April 2019

All 350 seats in the Congress of Deputies and 208 (of 266) seats in the Senate 176 seats needed for a majority in the Congress of Deputies
- Opinion polls
- Registered: 36,898,883 ▲1.0%
- Turnout: 26,478,140 (71.8%) ▲5.3 pp
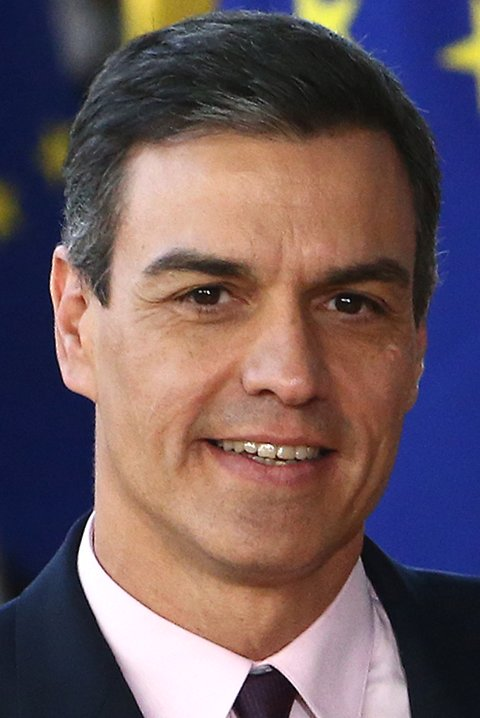

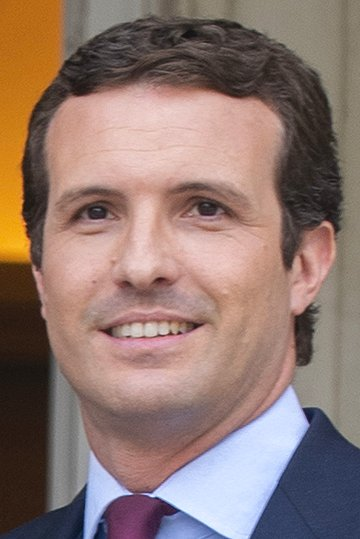

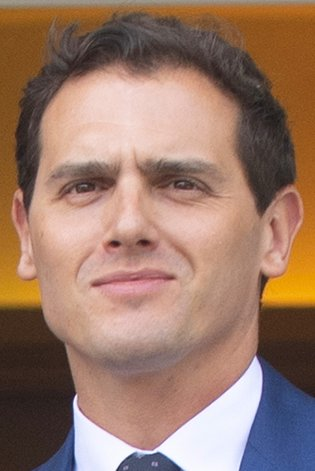

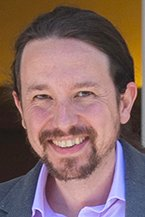

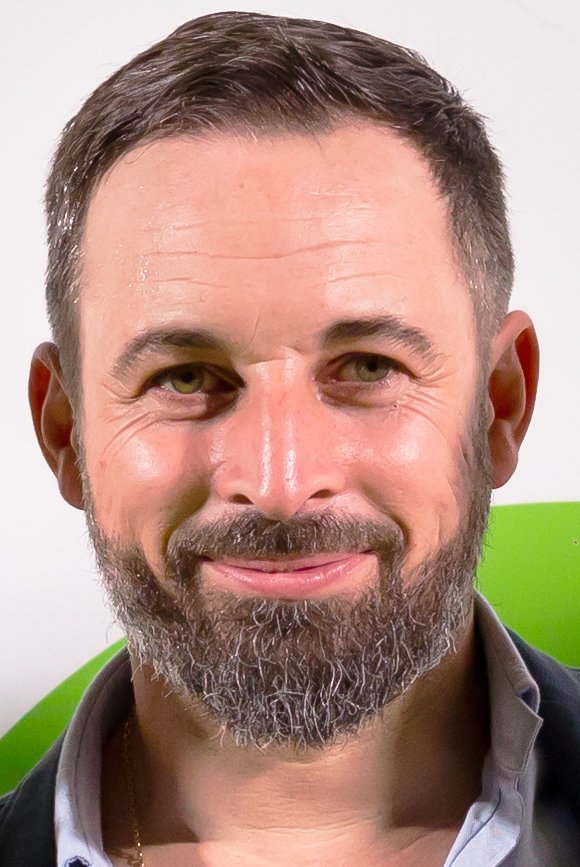

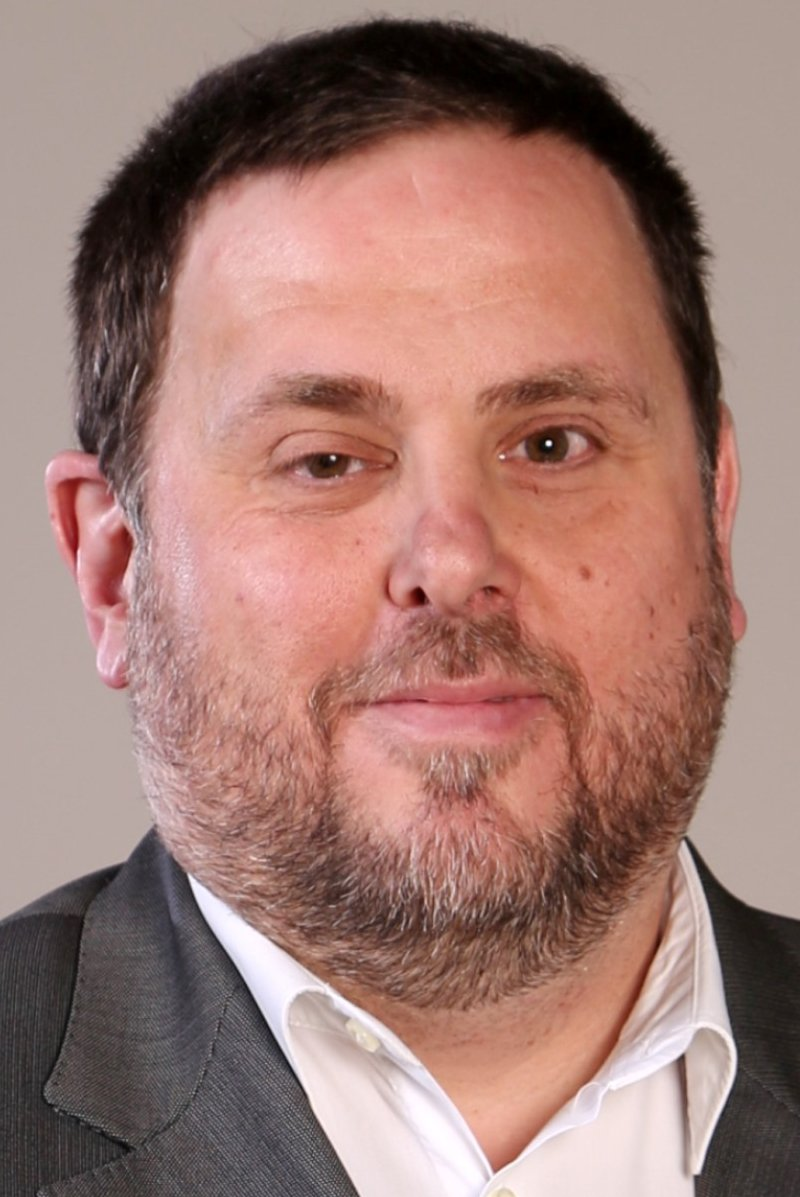
| | First party | Second party | Third party |
|---|---|---|---|
| Leader | Pedro Sánchez | Pablo Casado | Albert Rivera |
| Party | PSOE | PP | Cs |
| Leader since | 18 June 2017 | 21 July 2018 | 9 July 2006 |
| Leader's seat | Madrid | Madrid | Madrid |
| Last election | 85 seats, 22.6% | 135 seats, 32.6% (Note: Results in the 2016 Congress election, not including Navarre.) | 32 seats, 13.0% |
| Seats won | 123 | 66 | 57 |
| Seat change | ▲38 | ▼69 | ▲25 |
| Popular vote | 7,513,142 | 4,373,653 | 4,155,665 |
| Percentage | 28.7% | 16.7% | 15.9% |
| Swing | ▲6.1 pp | ▼15.9 pp | ▲2.9 pp |
| | Fourth party | Fifth party | Sixth party |
| Leader | Pablo Iglesias | Santiago Abascal | Oriol Junqueras (Note: At the time of the election, both Oriol Junqueras and Jordi Sànchez were in preventive detention in Soto del Real (Madrid).) |
| Party | Unidas Podemos (Note: Total figures include results for En Comú Podem and En Común.) | Vox | ERC–Sobiranistes |
| Leader since | 15 November 2014 | 20 September 2014 | 7 March 2019 |
| Leader's seat | Madrid | Madrid | Barcelona |
| Last election | 71 seats, 21.2% | 0 seats, 0.2% | 9 seats, 2.6% |
| Seats won | 42 | 24 | 15 |
| Seat change | ▼29 | ▲24 | ▲6 |
| Popular vote | 3,751,145 | 2,688,092 | 1,024,628 |
| Percentage | 14.3% | 10.3% | 3.9% |
| Swing | ▼6.9 pp | ▲10.1 pp | ▲1.3 pp |
Prime Minister before election
Pedro Sánchez
PSOE
Prime Minister after election
No government formed
and fresh election called.
Pedro Sánchez remains
acting Prime Minister

A general election was held in Spain on 28 April 2019 to elect the members of the 13th Cortes Generales under the Spanish Constitution of 1978. All 350 seats in the Congress of Deputies were up for election, as well as 208 of 266 seats in the Senate. It was held concurrently with a regional election in the Valencian Community.

Following the 2016 election, the People's Party (PP) formed a minority government with confidence and supply support from Citizens (Cs) and Canarian Coalition, enabled by the opposition Spanish Socialist Workers' Party (PSOE) abstaining from Mariano Rajoy's investiture after a party crisis saw the ousting of Pedro Sánchez as leader. Rajoy's second term in office was undermined by a constitutional crisis over the Catalan independence issue and the outcome of a regional election held thereafter, coupled with corruption scandals, the 2018 Spanish women's strike and pensioners' protests over pension hikes. In May 2018, the Spanish National Court found that the PP had profited from the kickbacks-for-contracts scheme in the Gürtel affair. Sánchez, who had been re-elected as PSOE leader in a party primary in 2017, brought down Rajoy's government through a motion of no confidence on 1 June 2018. Rajoy subsequently resigned as PP leader, being succeeded by Pablo Casado after a face-off with his former deputy, Soraya Sáenz de Santamaría, in a leadership contest in July.

As new prime minister of Spain, Pedro Sánchez struggled to maintain a working majority in the Congress with the support of the parties that had backed the no-confidence motion, adopting a program of social measures (such as restoring universal health care for undocumented migrants and a minimum wage raise), gestures for left-wing parties (such as announcing the exhumation of Franco's remains) and a more conciliatory approach toward the new Catalan government under new Quim Torra. The 2018 Andalusian election, which saw a strong performance by the far-right Vox party, resulted in the PSOE losing the regional government for the first time in history to a PP–Cs–Vox alliance. After the 2019 General State Budget was voted down in the Congress as a result of Republican Left of Catalonia and Catalan European Democratic Party siding against the government, Sánchez called a snap election for 28 April, one month ahead of the "Super Sunday" of local, regional and European Parliament elections scheduled for 26 May.

On a voter turnout of 71.8%, Sánchez's PSOE secured victory—the first for the party in a nationwide election since 2008—gaining 38 seats over its previous mark, mostly came at the expense of left-wing Unidas Podemos. The PSOE also became the largest party in the Senate for the first time since 1995, winning its first absolute majority in that chamber since 1989. The PP under Casado was reduced to 66 seats and 16.7% of the vote in the worst electoral setback for a major Spanish party since the collapse of the Union of the Democratic Centre in 1982, and which was partly blamed to the party's right-wing shift during the campaign. Cs saw an increase of support which brought them within striking distance of the PP, overcoming the latter in several major regions. The far-right Vox party entered Congress for the first time, but it failed to fulfill opinion polling expectations. The three-way split in the overall right-of-centre vote not only ended any chance of an Andalusian-inspired right-wing alliance, but it also ensured that Sánchez's PSOE would be the only party that could realistically form a government. Nonetheless, the failure in subsequent government formation negotiations resulted in Sánchez's re-election bid failing and a repeat election taking place in November.

== Background ==
The 2016 general election saw a strengthened People's Party (PP) and the left-wing Unidos Podemos alliance failing to overtake the Spanish Socialist Workers' Party (PSOE). Mariano Rajoy secured the support of Albert Rivera's Citizens (Cs) and Canarian Coalition for his investiture, but this was still not enough to guarantee his re-election as prime minister of Spain. Criticism to PSOE leader Pedro Sánchez for his opposition to Rajoy—seen as prolonging the political deadlock—intensified after poor results in the September 2016 regional elections. A party crisis followed, leading to Sánchez’s ousting and party rebels under the Andalusian president, Susana Díaz, taking control. The PSOE ultimately abstained in Rajoy's investiture, allowing a PP minority government to form and avoiding a third election. Díaz's bid to become party leader was defeated in the May 2017 primary election, with PSOE members reinstating Sánchez on an anti-Rajoy platform.

Early into its second term, Rajoy's government faced a dockworkers' strike against a European Union-mandated liberalization of port services, the Spanish Constitutional Court's overturn of the 2012 tax amnesty, the 2017 Barcelona attacks, and the unveiling of new political scandals. The Púnica and Lezo affairs—amid accusations of judicial meddling and cover-up affecting two former protégés (Ignacio González and Francisco Granados)—led to Esperanza Aguirre's downfall as PP Madrid city council leader, together with revelations of illegal funding of PP campaigns in the 2000s. The newly-appointed anti-corruption chief, Manuel Moix, resigned over a Panama Papers link and controversial attempts to interfere in corruption investigations affecting the ruling party. Rajoy became the first sitting Spanish prime minister to testify in court after being called as a witness in the Gürtel graft trial. Former Caja Madrid chairs Miguel Blesa and Rodrigo Rato (the later also a former International Monetary Fund chief and Spanish economy minister) were convicted for the misuse of corporate credit cards at the height of the financial crisis; Blesa would later commit suicide in July 2017. These developments prompted Unidos Podemos leader Pablo Iglesias (who had just overcome an internal challenge from Podemos's moderate sectors) to table a no-confidence motion against Rajoy in June 2017. This motion failed by 170–82, as the PSOE and other opposition parties abstained rather than support Iglesias as prime minister. Rajoy maintained stability by securing support from the Basque Nationalist Party (PNV) to his government's General State Budgets for 2017 and 2018. Economic growth and unemployment reduction kicked in after the 2008–2014 financial crisis.

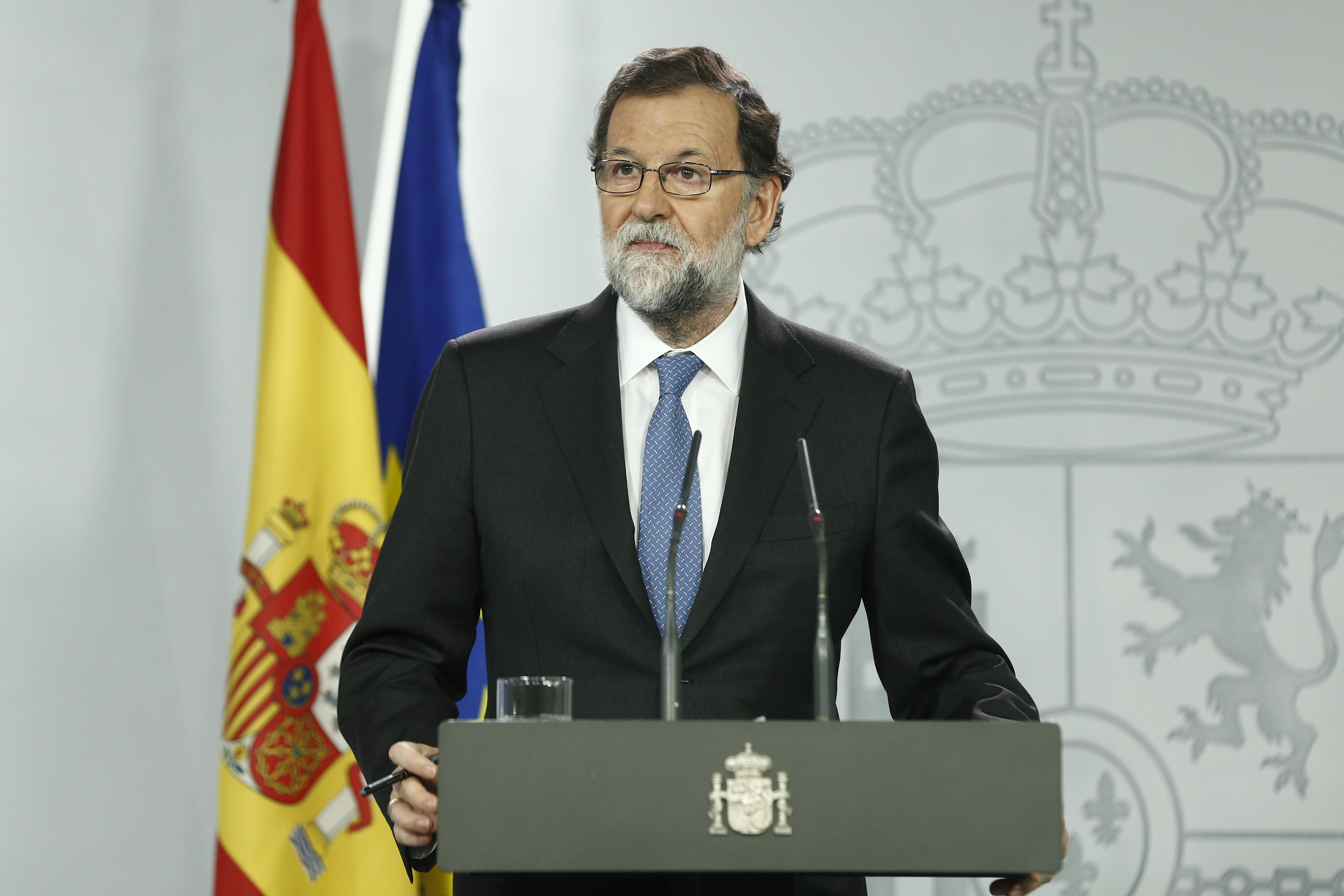
Prime Minister Mariano Rajoy announcing the enforcement of direct rule over Catalonia on 27 October 2017, in the wake of the constitutional crisis sparked by an attempt to declare unilateral independence

Pressure on the Spanish government intensified as a major constitutional crisis unfolded in Catalonia over the issue of a 2017 independence referendum. The Catalan parliament's steps to approve the referendum bill and a framework for an independent state in September 2017 were suspended by the Constitutional Court, while police operations against the preparations—including searches, raids, arrests of Catalan government officials and financial intervention—parked protests and accusations that Rajoy's government was imposing a de facto state of emergency. The referendum went ahead on 1 October 2017 amid a violent police crackdown, and the Catalan parliament later voted to unilaterally declare independence. In response, the Spanish government enforced direct rule over Catalonia and removed the regional authorities. The Catalan president, Carles Puigdemont, fled to Belgium with part of his cabinet, with European arrest warrants being issued over sedition, rebellion and embezzlement charges. Rajoy then dissolved the Catalan parliament and called a snap regional election for 21 December 2017, which backfired: pro-independence parties retained their majority, Cs strengthened its position in the region (boosting it nationally to first place in several opinion polls), and the PP was nearly wiped out.

Rajoy's government was further weakened by the success of the 2018 Spanish women's strike, driven by public outcry over gender-based violence, wage inequality, and high-profile cases such the La Manada gang rape; protests from pensioners over declining pensions; and a botched March 2018 attempt to extradite Puigdemont from Germany, which failed over the double criminality principle. Another scandal involved the Madrilenian president, Cristina Cifuentes, accused of fraudulently obtaining a master's degree from King Juan Carlos University; this escalated after the unveiling of a cover-up through the forgery of public instruments. Cifuentes eventually resigned in April 2018 following the release of a 2011 video showing her involvement in a face cream shoplifting incident.

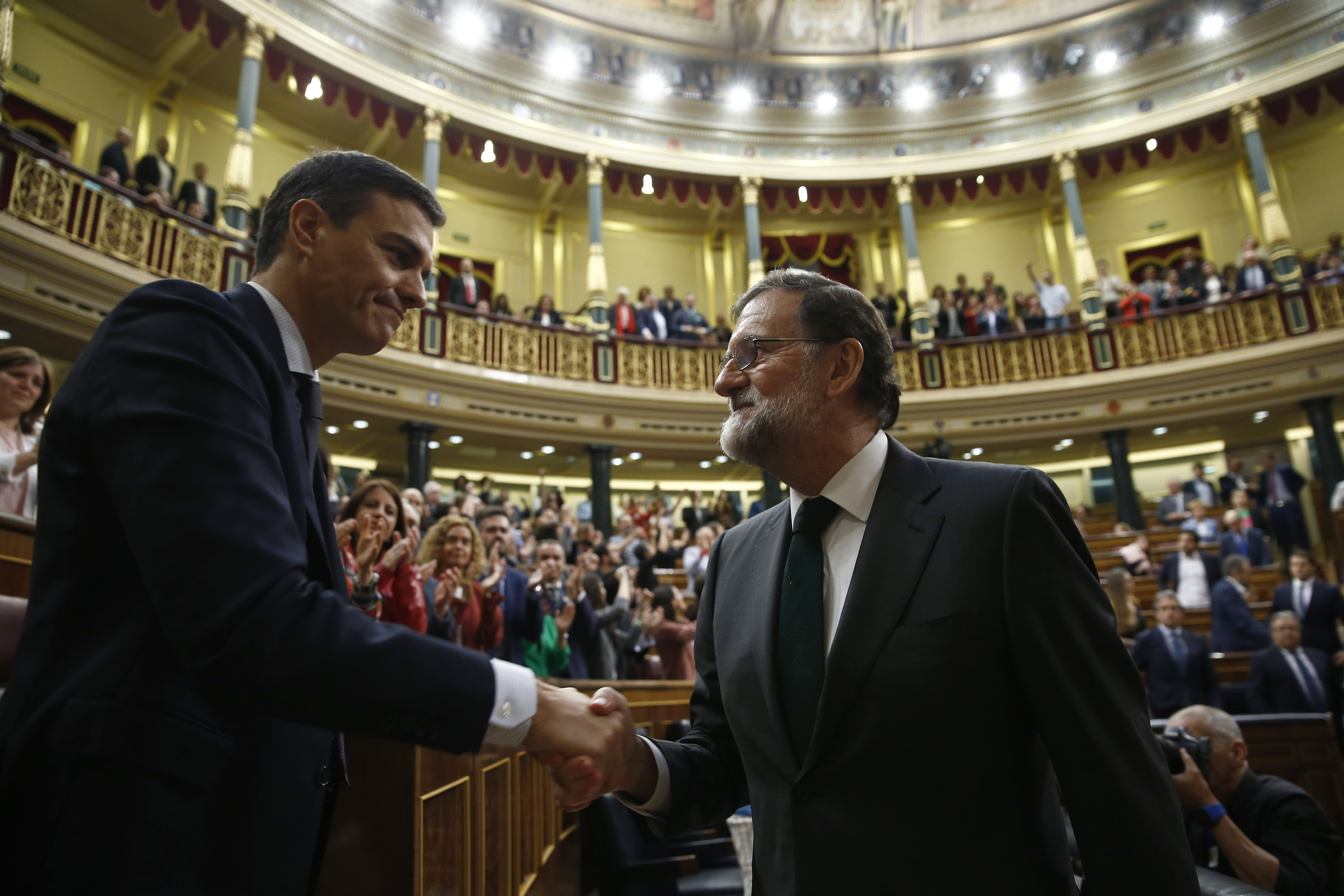
The outgoing prime minister Rajoy (right) congratulating the incoming prime minister Pedro Sánchez (left) upon losing the no confidence vote on 1 June 2018

On 24 May 2018, the Spanish National Court found that the PP had benefited from the Gürtel kickbacks-for-contracts scheme, confirming the existence of an illegal parallel accounting structure and an extensive system of institutional corruption affecting central, regional and local government contracts. This prompted the PSOE to submit a new no-confidence motion, while Cs withdrew its support from Rajoy and urged for a snap election. After a dramatic parliamentary meeting, the Congress of Deputies voted 180–169 on 1 June 2018 to remove Mariano Rajoy from office, replacing him with PSOE leader Pedro Sánchez as prime minister. Rajoy then announced his resignation as PP leader and his retirement from politics, triggering a party leadership contest in July that saw the PP's communication deputy secretary-general, Pablo Casado, defeating former deputy prime minister Soraya Sáenz de Santamaría.

For most of its term, Sánchez's first government relied on confidence and supply support from other parties, negotiating ad hoc agreements with Republican Left of Catalonia (ERC), the Catalan European Democratic Party (PDeCAT) and the PNV. Early measures included restoring universal health care for undocumented migrants (reversing a previous decision by Rajoy's cabinet); accepting the refugee ship Aquarius after the Italian government refused it entry; announcing the exhumation of late dictator Francisco Franco's remains from the Valley of the Fallen; and a minimum wage raise. Sánchez's government also adopted a more conciliatory approach toward Catalonia under new regional president Quim Torra. Efforts to distance the government from previous scandals led to the swift resignations of two ministers upon suspicions of wrongdoing: culture minister Màxim Huerta after just seven days over tax evasion issues; and health minister Carmen Montón in September 2018 over alleged irregularities in her master's degree (including plagiarism and discrepancies over her attendance and the marks awarded).

The success of the 2018 no-confidence motion reshaped Spanish politics, with the PSOE rising to first place in national opinion polls. Meanwhile, the now-opposition PP continued to decline, Cs's surge faded as Sánchez gained popularity, and voters from both parties increasingly shifted toward the resurgent far-right Vox amid growing polarization. In the 2018 Andalusian election, dissatisfaction with Susana Díaz's administration and doubts about Sánchez’s approach to Catalonia led to the PSOE losing the regional government for the first time in its history to a PP–Cs alliance supported by Vox, which also marked the first time since 1979 that the far-right gained parliamentary representation in Spain. ERC and PDeCAT later withdrew their support from Sánchez's government by voting down its 2019 budget. Combined with the perceived failure of a street protest strategy by the PP, Cs and Vox against Sánchez's Catalonia policy, this prompted the latter to dissolve parliament and call a snap election for 28 April 2019.

== Overview ==
Under the 1978 Constitution, the Spanish Cortes Generales were conceived as an imperfect bicameral system. The Congress of Deputies held greater legislative power than the Senate, having the ability to grant or withdraw confidence from a prime minister and to override Senate vetoes by an absolute majority. Nonetheless, the Senate retained a limited number of specific functions—such as ratifying international treaties, authorizing cooperation agreements between autonomous communities, enforcing direct rule, regulating interterritorial compensation funds, and taking part in constitutional amendments and in the appointment of members to the Constitutional Court and the General Council of the Judiciary—which were not subject to override by Congress.

=== Date ===
The term of each chamber of the Cortes Generales—the Congress and the Senate—expired four years from the date of their previous election, unless they were dissolved earlier. The election decree was required to be issued no later than 25 days before the scheduled expiration date of parliament and published on the following day in the Official State Gazette (BOE), with election day taking place 54 days after the decree's publication. The previous election was held on 26 June 2016, which meant that the chambers' terms would have expired on 26 June 2020. The election decree was required to be published in the BOE no later than 2 June 2020, setting the latest possible date for election day on 26 July 2020.

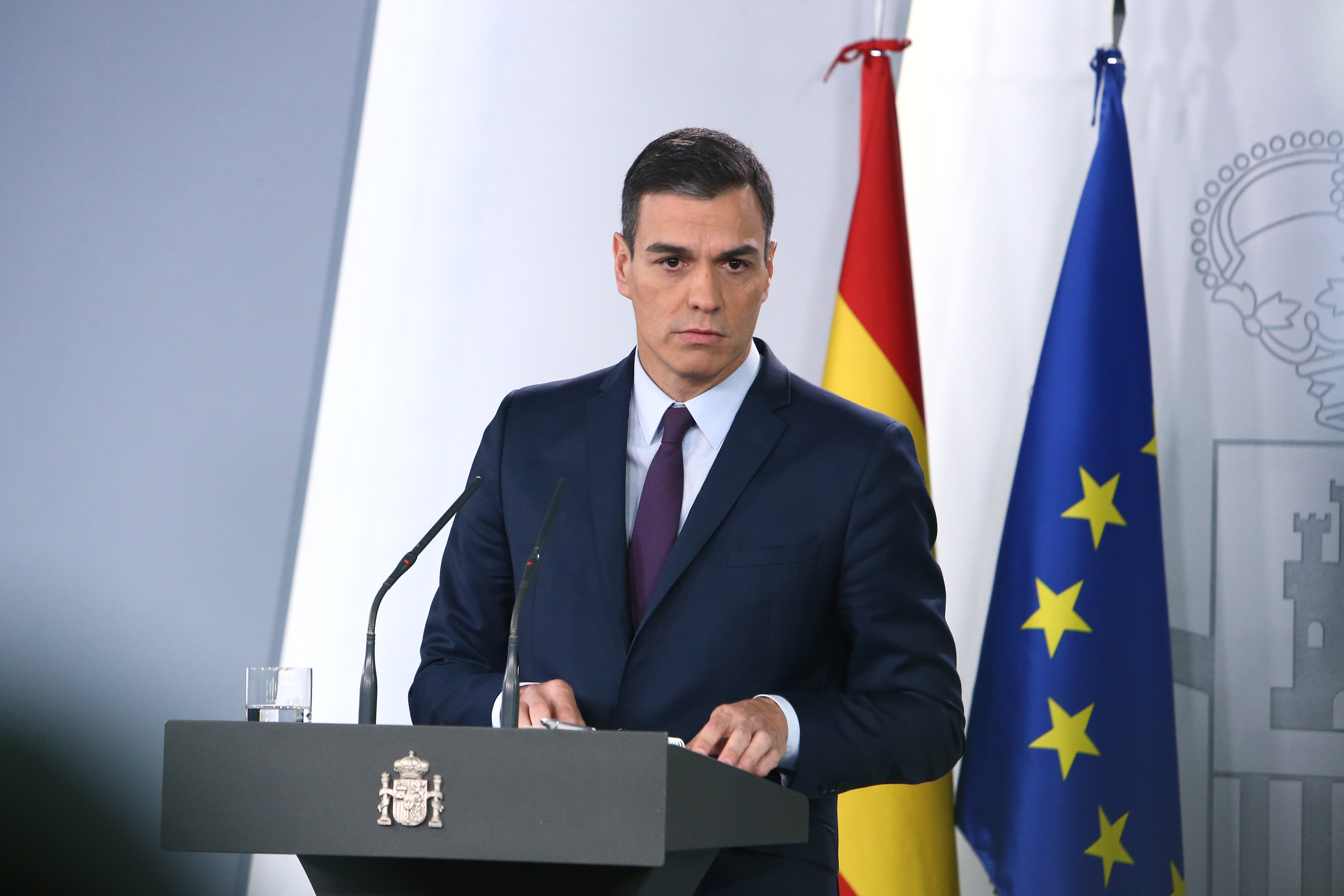
Prime Minister Pedro Sánchez announcing a snap election for 28 April 2019

The prime minister had the prerogative to propose the monarch to dissolve both chambers at any given time—either jointly or separately—and call a snap election, provided that no motion of no confidence was in process, no state of emergency was in force and that dissolution did not occur before one year after a previous one. Additionally, both chambers were to be dissolved and a new election called if an investiture process failed to elect a prime minister within a two-month period from the first ballot. Barring this exception, there was no constitutional requirement for simultaneous elections to the Congress and the Senate. Still, as of 2026, there has been no precedent of separate elections taking place under the 1978 Constitution.

The political impasse resulting from the 2015 and 2016 elections prompted a legal reform aimed at preventing a hypothetical third election on Christmas Day, introducing a shorter campaign period and other simplification measures. Speculation on a snap election started shortly after Rajoy's re-election, with El Mundo hinting at plans for one should his government failed at passing the state budget for 2017. This claim was quickly dismissed (and superseded by the budget's approval in June 2017), and again following Sánchez's re-election as PSOE leader in May 2017. The 2018 no-confidence motion was said to push Rajoy into considering a late 2018 or early 2019 election, but his ousting from office thwarted any such plan. PSOE's Sánchez and Cs's Rivera proposed an early election within a short timeframe from the 2018 no-confidence vote, but the former's appointment as prime minister prompted him to attempt serving out the remainder of the legislative term until 2020 instead. After the 2019 budget was voted down by parliament, a snap election was hinted for either 14 or 28 April (avoiding both the Holy Week holidays and the 26 May 2019 elections), with Sánchez confirming on 15 February the election date of 28 April.

The Cortes Generales were officially dissolved on 5 March 2019 with the publication of the corresponding decree in the BOE, setting election day for 28 April and scheduling for both chambers to reconvene on 21 May.

=== Electoral system ===
Voting for each chamber of the Cortes Generales was based on universal suffrage, comprising all Spanish nationals over 18 years of age with full political rights, provided that they had not been deprived of the right to vote by a final sentence. (Note: Amendments in 2018 granted the right to vote to those legally incapacitated.) Additionally, non-resident citizens were required to apply for voting, a system known as "begged" voting (Spanish: Voto rogado).

The Congress of Deputies had a minimum of 300 and a maximum of 400 seats, with electoral provisions fixing its size at 350. Of these, 348 were elected in 50 multi-member constituencies corresponding to the provinces of Spain—each of which was assigned an initial minimum of two seats and the remaining 248 distributed in proportion to population—using the D'Hondt method and closed-list proportional voting, with a three percent-threshold of valid votes (including blank ballots) in each constituency. The remaining two seats were allocated to Ceuta and Melilla as single-member districts elected by plurality voting. The use of this electoral method resulted in a higher effective threshold depending on district magnitude and vote distribution.

As a result of the aforementioned allocation, each Congress multi-member constituency was entitled the following seats:

| Seats | Constituencies |
|---|---|
| 37 | Madrid^{(+1)} |
| 32 | Barcelona^{(+1)} |
| 15 | Valencia^{(−1)} |
| 12 | Alicante, Seville |
| 11 | Málaga |
| 10 | Murcia |
| 9 | Cádiz |
| 8 | A Coruña, Balearic Islands, Biscay, Las Palmas |
| 7 | Asturias^{(−1)}, Granada, Pontevedra, Santa Cruz de Tenerife, Zaragoza |
| 6 | Almería, Badajoz, Córdoba, Gipuzkoa, Girona, Tarragona, Toledo |
| 5 | Cantabria, Castellón, Ciudad Real, Huelva, Jaén, Navarre, Valladolid |
| 4 | Álava, Albacete, Burgos, Cáceres, La Rioja, León, Lleida, Lugo, Ourense, Salamanca |
| 3 | Ávila, Cuenca, Guadalajara, Huesca, Palencia, Segovia, Teruel, Zamora |
| 2 | Soria |

208 Senate seats were elected using open-list (Note: Parties could group candidates into lists, although each candidate was treated separately for the purpose of the voting procedure.) partial block voting: voters in constituencies electing four seats could choose up to three candidates; in those with two or three seats, up to two; and in single-member districts, one. Each of the 47 peninsular provinces was allocated four seats, while in insular provinces—such as the Balearic and Canary Islands—the districts were the islands themselves, with the larger ones (Mallorca, Gran Canaria and Tenerife) being allocated three seats each, and the smaller ones (Menorca, Ibiza–Formentera, Fuerteventura, La Gomera, El Hierro, Lanzarote and La Palma) one each. Ceuta and Melilla elected two seats each. Additionally, autonomous communities could appoint at least one senator each and were entitled to one additional seat per million inhabitants.

The law did not provide for by-elections to fill vacant seats; instead, any vacancies arising after the proclamation of candidates and during the legislative term were filled by the next candidates on the party lists or, when required, by designated substitutes.

=== Outgoing parliament ===
The tables below show the composition of the parliamentary groups in both chambers at the time of dissolution.

Parliamentary composition in March 2019
Congress of Deputies
| Groups | Parties | Deputies | |
| Groups | Parties | Seats | Total |
|---|---|---|---|
| People's Parliamentary Group in the Congress | PP | 134 | 134 |
| Socialist Parliamentary Group | PSOE | 77 | 84 |
| Socialist Parliamentary Group | PSC | 7 | 84 |
| United We Can–In Common We Can–In Tide's; Confederal Parliamentary Group | Podemos | 46 | 67 |
| United We Can–In Common We Can–In Tide's; Confederal Parliamentary Group | CatComú | 9 | 67 |
| United We Can–In Common We Can–In Tide's; Confederal Parliamentary Group | IU | 7 | 67 |
| United We Can–In Common We Can–In Tide's; Confederal Parliamentary Group | Equo | 3 | 67 |
| United We Can–In Common We Can–In Tide's; Confederal Parliamentary Group | Anova | 2 | 67 |
| Citizens Parliamentary Group | Cs | 32 | 32 |
| Republican Left's Parliamentary Group | ERC | 9 | 9 |
| Basque Parliamentary Group (EAJ/PNV) | EAJ/PNV | 5 | 5 |
| Mixed Parliamentary Group | PDeCAT | 8 | 19 |
| Mixed Parliamentary Group | Compromís | 4 | 19 |
| Mixed Parliamentary Group | EH Bildu | 2 | 19 |
| Mixed Parliamentary Group | UPN | 2 | 19 |
| Mixed Parliamentary Group | CCa | 1 | 19 |
| Mixed Parliamentary Group | FAC | 1 | 19 |
| Mixed Parliamentary Group | NCa | 1 | 19 |

Parliamentary composition in March 2019
Senate
| Groups | Parties | Senators | |
| Groups | Parties | Seats | Total |
|---|---|---|---|
| People's Parliamentary Group in the Senate | PP | 145 | 147 |
| People's Parliamentary Group in the Senate | PAR | 2 | 147 |
| Socialist Parliamentary Group | PSOE | 59 | 60 |
| Socialist Parliamentary Group | PSC | 1 | 60 |
| United We Can–In Common We Can–In Tide; Parliamentary Group | Podemos | 15 | 20 |
| United We Can–In Common We Can–In Tide; Parliamentary Group | CatComú | 3 | 20 |
| United We Can–In Common We Can–In Tide; Parliamentary Group | IU | 2 | 20 |
| Republican Left's Parliamentary Group | ERC | 12 | 12 |
| Basque Parliamentary Group in the Senate (EAJ/PNV) | EAJ/PNV | 6 | 6 |
| Nationalist Parliamentary Group, Democratic; Party (PDeCAT–CDC)–Independent Herrenian; Group/Canarian Coalition (AHI/CC–PNC) | PDeCAT | 4 | 6 |
| Nationalist Parliamentary Group, Democratic; Party (PDeCAT–CDC)–Independent Herrenian; Group/Canarian Coalition (AHI/CC–PNC) | CCa | 1 | 6 |
| Nationalist Parliamentary Group, Democratic; Party (PDeCAT–CDC)–Independent Herrenian; Group/Canarian Coalition (AHI/CC–PNC) | AHI | 1 | 6 |
| Mixed Parliamentary Group | Cs | 6 | 15 |
| Mixed Parliamentary Group | Compromís | 2 | 15 |
| Mixed Parliamentary Group | UPN | 1 | 15 |
| Mixed Parliamentary Group | FAC | 1 | 15 |
| Mixed Parliamentary Group | NCa | 1 | 15 |
| Mixed Parliamentary Group | EH Bildu | 1 | 15 |
| Mixed Parliamentary Group | ASG | 1 | 15 |
| Mixed Parliamentary Group | Vox | 1 | 15 |
| Mixed Parliamentary Group | INDEP | 1 (Note: Elvira García, former Podemos legislator.) | 15 |

== Candidates ==
=== Nomination rules ===
Spanish citizens with the right to vote could run for election, provided that they had not been criminally imprisoned by a final sentence or convicted—whether final or not—of offences that involved loss of eligibility or disqualification from public office (such as rebellion, terrorism or other crimes against the state). Additional causes of ineligibility applied to the following officials:

- Members of the Spanish royal family and their spouses;
- Holders of a number of senior public or institutional posts, including the heads and members of higher courts and state institutions; (Note: These comprised the Constitutional Court, the General Council of the Judiciary, the Supreme Court, the Council of State, the Court of Auditors and the Economic and Social Council.) the Ombudsman; the State's Attorney General; high-ranking officials of government departments, the Office of the Prime Minister and other state agencies; government delegates in the autonomous communities; the chair of RTVE; the director of the Electoral Register Office; the governor and deputy governor of the Bank of Spain; the heads of official credit institutions; and members of electoral commissions and of the Nuclear Safety Council;
- Heads of diplomatic missions abroad;
- Judges and public prosecutors in active service;
- Members of the Armed Forces and law enforcement bodies in active service.

Other ineligibility provisions also applied to a number of territorial officials in these categories within their areas of jurisdiction, as well as to employees of foreign states and members of regional governments.

Incompatibility rules included those of ineligibility, and also barred running in multiple constituencies or lists, holding office if the candidacy was later declared illegal (by a final ruling), and combining legislative roles (deputy, senator, and regional lawmaker) with each other or with:

- A number of senior public or institutional posts, including the presidency of the National Commission on Markets and Competition; and leadership positions in RTVE, government offices, public authorities (such as port authorities, hydrographic confederations, or highway concessionary companies), public entities and state-owned or publicly funded companies;
- Any other paid public or private position, except university teaching.

=== Parties and lists ===
The electoral law allowed for parties and federations registered in the interior ministry, alliances and groupings of electors to present lists of candidates. Parties and federations intending to form an alliance were required to inform the relevant electoral commission within 10 days of the election call, whereas groupings of electors needed to secure the signature of at least one percent of the electorate in the constituencies for which they sought election, disallowing electors from signing for more than one list. Concurrently, parties, federations or alliances that had not obtained a mandate in either chamber of the Cortes at the preceding election were required to secure the signature of at least 0.1 percent of electors in the aforementioned constituencies. Additionally, a balanced composition of men and women was required in the electoral lists, so that candidates of either sex made up at least 40 percent of the total composition.

After the experience of the 2015–2016 political deadlock leading to the June 2016 election and the possibility of a third election being needed, the electoral law was amended in order to introduce a special, simplified process for election re-runs, including a shortening of deadlines, electoral campaigning, the lifting of signature requirements if these had been already met for the immediately previous election and the possibility of maintaining lists and alliances without needing to go through pre-election procedures again.

Below is a list of the main parties and electoral alliances which contested the election:

| Candidacy | Parties and alliances | Leading candidate | Ideology | Previous result | | | | Gov. | Ref. |
| Candidacy | Parties and alliances | Leading candidate | Ideology | Congress | | Senate | | Gov. | Ref. |
| Candidacy | Parties and alliances | Leading candidate | Ideology | Vote % | Seats | Vote % | Seats | Gov. | Ref. |
|---|---|---|---|---|---|---|---|---|---|
| PP | List: People's Party (PP); Forum of Citizens (FAC) | Pablo Casado | Conservatism; Christian democracy | 32.6% | 135 | 33.7% (Note: Results in the 2016 Senate election, not including Navarre.) | 127 | No | |
| PSOE | List: Spanish Socialist Workers' Party (PSOE); Socialists' Party of Catalonia (PSC) | Pedro Sánchez | Social democracy | 22.6% | 85 | 23.6% | 43 | Yes | |
| Unidas; Podemos | List: We Can (Podemos); United Left (IU) – Communist Party of Spain (PCE) – The Dawn Marxist Organization (La Aurora (OM)) – Republican Left (IR) – Feminist Party of Spain (PFE) – Unitarian Candidacy of Workers (CUT); Equo (Equo); Assembly (Batzarre); Upper Aragon in Common (AltoAragón en Común); Progressive Voices (Veus Progressistes) (Note: In the Senate.) – More for Mallorca (Més) – Republican Left of Catalonia (ERC); In Common We Can−Let's Win Change (ECP–Guanyem el Canvi) – Catalonia in Common (CatComú) – We Can (Podem) – Initiative for Catalonia Greens (ICV) – United and Alternative Left (EUiA); In Common–United We Can (Podemos–EU–Mareas en Común–Equo) – We Can (Podemos) – United Left (EU) – Equo (Equo) | Pablo Iglesias | Left-wing populism Direct democracy Democratic socialism | 21.2% | 71 | 19.3% | 15 | No | |
| Cs | List: Citizens–Party of the Citizenry (Cs) | Albert Rivera | Liberalism | 13.0% | 32 | 10.5% | 0 | No | |
| ERC– Sobiranistes | List: Republican Left of Catalonia (ERC); Sovereigntists (Sobiranistes); Republican Left of the Valencian Country (ERPV) | Oriol Junqueras | Catalan independence Left-wing nationalism Social democracy | 2.7% | 9 | 3.0% | 10 | No | |
| JxCat–Junts | List: Catalan European Democratic Party (PDeCAT); Democratic Convergence of Catalonia (CDC) (Note: CDC was registered as an independent member within the alliance in order to allow its successor party, the PDeCAT, to be guaranteed CDC's public funding and electoral rights for the campaign.); Together for Catalonia (JxCat) – National Call for the Republic (CNxR) | Jordi Sànchez | Catalan independence Liberalism | 2.0% (Note: Results for CDC in the 2016 election.) | 8 | 2.2% | 2 | No | |
| EAJ/PNV | List: Basque Nationalist Party (EAJ/PNV) | Aitor Esteban | Basque nationalism Christian democracy | 1.2% | 5 | 1.4% | 5 | No | |
| EH Bildu | List: Basque Country Gather (EH Bildu) – Create (Sortu) – Basque Solidarity (EA) – Alternative (Alternatiba) | Mertxe Aizpurua (Note: EH Bildu did not field a single visible leader; instead, prominence was given to the lead candidate in each of the constituencies where it ran. Mertxe Aizpurua from Gipuzkoa was later selected as EH Bildu's spokesperson in Congress.) | Basque independence Abertzale left Socialism | 0.8% | 2 | 0.9% | 0 | No | |
| NA+ | List: Navarrese People's Union (UPN); People's Party (PP) (Note: In Navarre.); Citizens–Party of the Citizenry (Cs) | Sergio Sayas | Regionalism; Christian democracy Conservatism; Liberalism | 0.5% (Note: Results for UPN–PP (0.4%, 2 deputies) and C's (0.1%, 0 deputies) in the 2016 Congress election in Navarre.) | 2 | 0.6% (Note: Results for UPN–PP (0.5%, 3 senators) and C's (0.1%, 0 senators) in the 2016 Senate election in Navarre.) | 3 | No | |
| CCa–PNC | List: Canarian Coalition (CCa); Canarian Nationalist Party (PNC); Independent Herrenian Group (AHI) | Ana Oramas | Regionalism; Canarian nationalism Centrism | 0.3% | 1 | 0.2% | 1 | No | |
| Vox | List: Vox (Vox) | Santiago Abascal | Right-wing populism Ultranationalism; National conservatism | 0.2% | 0 | 0.3% | 0 | No | |
| Cambio/ Aldaketa | List: We Can (Podemos); Left (I–E (n)); Basque Country Gather (EH Bildu); Yes to the Future (GBai) | Ricardo Feliú | Basque nationalism | Did not contest | | 0.6% (Note: Results for Unidas Podemos (0.3%, 1 senator), EH Bildu (0.2%, 0 senators) and GBai (0.0%, 0 senators) in the April 2019 Senate election in Navarre.) | 1 | No | |
| ASG | List: Gomera Socialist Group (ASG) | Yaiza Castilla | Insularism; Social democracy | Did not contest | | 0.0% | 1 | No | |
| Compromís | List: Valencian Nationalist Bloc (Bloc); Valencian People's Initiative (IdPV); Greens Equo of the Valencian Country (VerdsEquo) | Joan Baldoví | Valencianism; Progressivism; Green politics | Contested in alliance (Note: Compromís (4 deputies and 1 senator) contested the 2016 election within the A la valenciana alliance.) | | | | No | |
| NCa | List: New Canaries (NCa) | Pedro Quevedo | Canarian nationalism Social democracy | Contested in alliance (Note: NCa (1 deputy and 1 senator) contested the 2016 election in alliance with the PSOE.) | | | | No | |
| PRC | List: Regionalist Party of Cantabria (PRC) | José María Mazón | Regionalism; Centrism | Did not contest | | | | No | |

The People's Party (PP) and Forum of Citizens maintained their alliance ahead of the general election, but the Aragonese Party rejected running altogether. In Navarre, two opposing alliances were formed at different levels: for the Senate, Geroa Bai, EH Bildu, Podemos and Izquierda-Ezkerra re-established the Cambio/Aldaketa alliance under which they had already contested the 2015 general election. Concurrently, the Navarrese People's Union, Cs and the PP formed the Navarra Suma alliance for both Congress and Senate elections.

In Galicia, En Marea, the former alliance formed by Podemos, United Left and Anova which had been constituted as a party in 2016, broke away from its creator parties and announced that it would contest the election on its own. Podemos, EU and Equo in Galicia formed a regional branch for the Unidas Podemos alliance branded En Común–Unidas Podemos (Spanish for "In Common–United We Can") whereas Anova chose to step out from the election race. In the Balearic Islands, an alliance was formed for the Congress election by More for Majorca (Més), More for Menorca (MpM), Now Eivissa (Ara Eivissa) and Republican Left of Catalonia (ERC), named Veus Progressistes (Catalan for "Progressive Voices"); for the Senate election, the alliance was styled as Unidas Podemos–Veus Progressistes (English: United We Can–Progressive Voices) and included Podemos and IU.

== Campaign ==
=== Timetable ===
The key dates are listed below (all times are CET. The Canary Islands used WET (UTC+0) instead):

- 4 March: The election decree is issued with the countersign of the prime minister, after deliberation in the Council of Ministers, ratified by the King.
- 5 March: Formal dissolution of parliament and start of prohibition period on the inauguration of public works, services or projects.
- 8 March: Initial constitution of provincial and zone electoral commissions with judicial members.
- 11 March: Division of constituencies into polling sections and stations.
- 15 March: Deadline for parties and federations to report on their electoral alliances.
- 18 March: Deadline for electoral register consultation for the purpose of possible corrections.
- 25 March: Deadline for parties, federations, alliances, and groupings of electors to present electoral lists.
- 27 March: Publication of submitted electoral lists in the Official State Gazette (BOE).
- 30 March: Deadline for non-resident citizens (electors residing abroad (CERA) and citizens temporarily absent from Spain) to apply for voting (extended to 1 April by the Central Electoral Commission).
- 1 April: Official proclamation of validly submitted electoral lists.
- 2 April: Publication of proclaimed electoral lists in the BOE.
- 3 April: Deadline for the selection of polling station members by sortition.
- 11 April: Deadline for the appointment of non-judicial members to provincial and zone electoral commissions.
- 12 April: Official start of electoral campaigning.
- 18 April: Deadline to apply for postal voting.
- 23 April: Start of legal ban on electoral opinion polling publication; deadline for CERA citizens to vote by mail.
- 24 April: Deadline for postal and temporarily absent voting (extended to 25 April by the Central Electoral Commission).
- 26 April: Last day of electoral campaigning; deadline for CERA voting (extended to 28 April by the Central Electoral Commission).
- 27 April: Official election silence ("reflection day").
- 28 April: Election day (polling stations open at 9 am and close at 8 pm or once voters present in a queue at/outside the polling station at 8 pm have cast their vote); provisional vote counting.
- 1 May: Start of general vote counting, including CERA votes.
- 4 May: Deadline for the general vote counting.
- 13 May: Deadline for the proclamation of elected members.
- 23 May: Deadline for the reconvening of parliament (date determined by the election decree, which for the April 2019 election was set for 21 May).
- 22 June: Deadline for the publication of definitive election results in the BOE.

=== Party slogans ===
| Party or alliance | Original slogan | English translation | Ref. |
|---|---|---|---|
| PP | « Valor seguro » | "Safe asset" | |
| PSOE | « La España que quieres » (Note: This slogan had been initially conceived for the pre-campaign period, but was later used as a secondary slogan throughout the official electoral campaign.) « Haz que pase » & « Estamos muy cerca » | "The Spain you want" "Make it happen" & "We are so close" | |
| Unidas Podemos: ECP | Main: « La historia la escribes tú » ECP: « Guanyem per avançar » | Main: "You write history" ECP: "Let's win to advance" | |
| Cs | « ¡Vamos Ciudadanos! » | "Let's go Citizens!" | |
| ERC–Sobiranistes | « Va de llibertat » | "It's about freedom" | |
| JxCat–Junts | « Tu ets la nostra força. Tu ets la nostra veu » | "You are our strength. You are our voice" | |
| EAJ/PNV | « Nos mueve Euskadi. Zurea, gurea » | "The Basque Country moves us. What's yours is ours" | |
| EH Bildu | « Erabaki. Para avanzar » | "Decide. To make progress" | |
| CCa–PNC | « Luchamos por Canarias » | "We fight for Canaries" | |
| Vox | « Por España » | "For Spain" | |
| Compromís | « Imparables » | "Unstoppable" | |
| NCa | « Para defender Canarias. Canarias con futuro » | "To defend the Canaries. Canaries with future" | |
| NA+ | « Navarra suma contigo » | "Navarre sums with you" | |

=== Debates ===
April 2019 Spanish general election debates
| Date | Organizer(s) | Moderator(s) | P Present (Note: Denotes a main invitee attending the event.) S Surrogate (Note: Denotes a main invitee not attending the event, sending a surrogate in their place.) NI Not invited I Invited A Absent invitee | | | | | | | | | |
| Date | Organizer(s) | Moderator(s) | PP | PSOE | UP | Cs | ERC | JxCat | PNV | Vox | Audience | Ref. |
|---|---|---|---|---|---|---|---|---|---|---|---|---|
| 17 March | laSexta (El Objetivo) (Note: Economic debate.) | Ana Pastor | P Lacalle | P Saura | P Álvarez | P Roldán | NI | NI | NI | NI | 4.5% (758,000) | |
| 8 April | El Confidencial (Note: "Women's debate".) | Isabel Morillo; Paloma Esteban | P Uriarte | P M. Montero | P I. Montero | P Arrimadas | NI | NI | NI | P Monasterio | — | |
| 10 April | Cuatro (Todo es Mentira) | Risto Mejide | S Maroto | S M. Montero | S Vera | S Cantó | NI | NI | NI | A | 6.2% (735,000) | |
| 10 April | Cuatro (Todo es Mentira) | Risto Mejide | S Maroto | S M. Montero | S Vera | S Cantó | S Rufián | S Cuevillas | P Esteban | A | 7.2% (736,000) | |
| 13 April | laSexta (La Sexta Noche) | Iñaki López | P Uriarte | P M. Montero | P I. Montero | P Arrimadas | NI | NI | NI | A | 9.4% (1,027,000) | |
| 16 April | RTVE | Xabier Fortes | S A. de Toledo | S M. Montero | S I. Montero | S Arrimadas | S Rufián | NI | P Esteban | NI | 11.8% (1,794,000) | |
| 20 April | laSexta (La Sexta Noche) | Iñaki López | S Egea | S Sicilia | S Garzón | S Cantó | S Rufián | S Borràs | P Esteban | NI | 9.3% (997,000) | |
| 22 April | RTVE | Xabier Fortes | P Casado | P Sánchez | P Iglesias | P Rivera | NI | NI | NI | NI | 43.8% (8,886,000) | |
| 23 April | Atresmedia | Ana Pastor; Vicente Vallés | P Casado | P Sánchez | P Iglesias | P Rivera | NI | NI | NI | NI (Note: Vox's candidate Santiago Abascal had been initially invited, but was excluded after the Central Electoral Commission threatened to suspend the debate on its proposed format, claiming that Vox's presence would breach the proportionality principle under law.) | 48.8% (9,477,000) | |

Opinion polls

Candidate viewed as "performing best" or "most convincing" in each debate
| Debate | Polling firm/Commissioner | Sample | PP | PSOE | UP | Cs | Tie | None | Question |
|---|---|---|---|---|---|---|---|---|---|
| 22 April | ElectoPanel/Electomanía | ? | 16.0 | 24.0 | 24.0 | 34.0 | – | 1.0 | 1.0 |
| 22 April | SocioMétrica/El Español | 600 | 18.0 | 13.0 | 19.0 | 27.0 | – | – | 24.0 |
| 23 April | ElectoPanel/Electomanía | ? | 18.0 | 13.0 | 34.0 | 33.0 | – | 2.0 | 0.0 |
| 23 April | SocioMétrica/El Español | 791 | 12.5 | 14.3 | 21.3 | 28.2 | – | – | 23.7 |
| Both | NC Report/La Razón | ? | 25.7 | 18.6 | 25.7 | 30.0 | – | – | – |
| Both | CIS | 5,943 | 5.6 | 19.1 | 34.7 | 16.6 | 4.2 | 14.7 | 5.1 |

== Opinion polls ==
Local regression trend line of poll results from 26 June 2016 to 28 April 2019, with each line corresponding to a political party.

== Voter turnout ==
The table below shows registered voter turnout during the election. Figures for election day do not include non-resident citizens, while final figures do.

| Region | Time (Election day) | | | | | | | | | Final | | |
| Region | 14:00 | | | 18:00 | | | 20:00 | | | Final | | |
| Region | 2016 | 2019 | +/– | 2016 | 2019 | +/– | 2016 | 2019 | +/– | 2016 | 2019 | +/– |
|---|---|---|---|---|---|---|---|---|---|---|---|---|
| Andalusia | 37.60% | 38.94% | +1.34 | 50.25% | 57.23% | +6.98 | 68.16% | 73.30% | +5.14 | 66.05% | 70.78% | +4.73 |
| Aragon | 37.88% | 44.65% | +6.77 | 50.86% | 62.30% | +11.44 | 71.89% | 77.62% | +5.73 | 69.92% | 75.20% | +5.28 |
| Asturias | 34.70% | 40.15% | +5.45 | 50.84% | 58.67% | +7.83 | 68.19% | 73.35% | +5.16 | 61.09% | 65.02% | +3.93 |
| Balearic Islands | 34.48% | 38.10% | +3.62 | 47.05% | 54.42% | +7.37 | 62.58% | 67.56% | +4.98 | 60.73% | 65.37% | +4.64 |
| Basque Country | 36.05% | 41.75% | +5.70 | 51.36% | 60.05% | +8.69 | 67.44% | 74.55% | +7.11 | 65.17% | 71.78% | +6.61 |
| Canary Islands | 28.38% | 30.72% | +2.34 | 44.86% | 51.00% | +6.14 | 64.37% | 68.15% | +3.78 | 59.11% | 62.46% | +3.35 |
| Cantabria | 39.22% | 43.12% | +3.90 | 56.19% | 63.64% | +7.45 | 73.37% | 78.00% | +4.63 | 68.52% | 72.38% | +3.86 |
| Castile and León | 37.18% | 41.80% | +4.62 | 53.33% | 61.99% | +8.66 | 73.34% | 78.16% | +4.82 | 68.79% | 72.87% | +4.08 |
| Castilla–La Mancha | 38.92% | 42.71% | +3.79 | 52.44% | 62.35% | +9.91 | 72.94% | 78.02% | +5.08 | 71.78% | 76.57% | +4.79 |
| Catalonia | 32.31% | 43.52% | +11.21 | 46.38% | 64.20% | +17.82 | 65.60% | 77.57% | +11.97 | 63.42% | 74.57% | +11.15 |
| Extremadura | 39.48% | 42.86% | +3.38 | 51.40% | 60.21% | +8.81 | 70.45% | 76.31% | +5.86 | 68.63% | 74.17% | +5.54 |
| Galicia | 34.07% | 36.97% | +2.90 | 51.68% | 58.91% | +7.23 | 69.63% | 73.97% | +4.34 | 58.76% | 61.87% | +3.11 |
| La Rioja | 40.94% | 44.67% | +3.73 | 55.61% | 61.51% | +5.90 | 74.71% | 78.12% | +3.41 | 70.62% | 73.38% | +2.76 |
| Madrid | 39.01% | 43.61% | +4.60 | 54.48% | 65.10% | +10.62 | 74.26% | 79.76% | +5.50 | 70.81% | 75.46% | +4.65 |
| Murcia | 39.96% | 43.41% | +3.45 | 52.89% | 61.75% | +8.86 | 71.35% | 75.69% | +4.34 | 69.58% | 73.53% | +3.95 |
| Navarre | 38.03% | 43.79% | +5.76 | 51.77% | 60.89% | +9.12 | 70.58% | 76.32% | +5.74 | 67.40% | 72.53% | +5.13 |
| Valencian Community | 43.34% | 45.87% | +2.53 | 56.51% | 61.64% | +5.13 | 74.09% | 76.33% | +2.24 | 72.37% | 74.29% | +1.92 |
| Ceuta | 24.97% | 30.47% | +5.50 | 37.51% | 48.84% | +11.33 | 52.59% | 63.97% | +11.38 | 50.65% | 61.44% | +10.79 |
| Melilla | 21.82% | 28.14% | +6.32 | 34.32% | 45.44% | +11.12 | 51.35% | 62.94% | +11.59 | 47.55% | 57.53% | +9.98 |
| Total | 36.87% | 41.49% | +4.62 | 51.21% | 60.74% | +9.53 | 69.83% | 75.75% | +5.92 | 66.48% | 71.76% | +5.28 |

== Results ==
=== Congress of Deputies ===
← Summary of the 28 April 2019 Congress of Deputies election results →
| Parties and alliances | Popular vote | | | Seats | |
| Parties and alliances | Votes | % | ±pp | Total | +/− |
|---|---|---|---|---|---|
| Spanish Socialist Workers' Party (PSOE) | 7,513,142 | 28.67 | +6.04 | 123 | +38 |
| People's Party (PP)^{1} | 4,373,653 | 16.69 | −15.88 | 66 | −69 |
| Citizens–Party of the Citizenry (Cs)^{1} | 4,155,665 | 15.86 | +2.88 | 57 | +25 |
| United We Can (Unidas Podemos) | 3,751,145 | 14.32 | −6.83 | 42 | −29 |
| United We Can (Podemos–IU–Equo)^{2} | 2,897,419 | 11.06 | −5.10 | 33 | −21 |
| In Common We Can–Let's Win the Change (ECP–Guanyem el Canvi) | 615,665 | 2.35 | −1.20 | 7 | −5 |
| In Common–United We Can (Podemos–EU–Mareas en Común–Equo)^{3} | 238,061 | 0.91 | −0.53 | 2 | −3 |
| Vox (Vox) | 2,688,092 | 10.26 | +10.06 | 24 | +24 |
| Republican Left of Catalonia–Sovereigntists (ERC–Sobiranistes) | 1,024,628 | 3.91 | +1.28 | 15 | +6 |
| Republican Left of Catalonia–Sovereigntists (ERC–Sobiranistes) | 1,020,392 | 3.89 | +1.26 | 15 | +6 |
| Republican Left of the Valencian Country (ERPV) | 4,236 | 0.02 | New | 0 | ±0 |
| Together for Catalonia–Together (JxCat–Junts)^{4} | 500,787 | 1.91 | −0.10 | 7 | −1 |
| Basque Nationalist Party (EAJ/PNV) | 395,884 | 1.51 | +0.32 | 6 | +1 |
| Animalist Party Against Mistreatment of Animals (PACMA) | 328,299 | 1.25 | +0.06 | 0 | ±0 |
| Basque Country Gather (EH Bildu) | 259,647 | 0.99 | +0.22 | 4 | +2 |
| Commitment: Bloc–Initiative–Greens Equo (Compromís 2019) | 173,821 | 0.66 | New | 1 | +1 |
| Canarian Coalition–Canarian Nationalist Party (CCa–PNC) | 137,664 | 0.53 | +0.20 | 2 | +1 |
| Free People–We Are Alternative–Pirates: Republican Front (Front Republicà) | 113,807 | 0.43 | New | 0 | ±0 |
| Sum Navarre (NA+)^{5} | 107,619 | 0.41 | −0.12 | 2 | ±0 |
| Galician Nationalist Bloc (BNG) | 94,433 | 0.36 | +0.17 | 0 | ±0 |
| Regionalist Party of Cantabria (PRC) | 52,266 | 0.20 | New | 1 | +1 |
| Zero Cuts–Green Group (Recortes Cero–GV) | 47,363 | 0.18 | −0.04 | 0 | ±0 |
| New Canaries (NCa) | 36,225 | 0.14 | New | 0 | ±0 |
| Act (PACT) | 30,236 | 0.12 | New | 0 | ±0 |
| Progressive Voices (Ara–Més–esquerra) | 25,191 | 0.10 | New | 0 | ±0 |
| Yes to the Future (GBai) | 22,309 | 0.09 | +0.03 | 0 | ±0 |
| For a Fairer World (PUM+J) | 21,863 | 0.08 | New | 0 | ±0 |
| In Tide (En Marea) | 17,899 | 0.07 | New | 0 | ±0 |
| Communists (PCPE–PCPC–PCPA) | 17,061 | 0.07 | −0.04 | 0 | ±0 |
| Communist Party of the Workers of Spain (PCTE) | 14,022 | 0.05 | New | 0 | ±0 |
| El Pi–Proposal for the Isles (El Pi) | 11,692 | 0.04 | New | 0 | ±0 |
| Andalusia by Herself (AxSí) | 11,407 | 0.04 | New | 0 | ±0 |
| Spanish Communist Workers' Party (PCOE) | 9,130 | 0.03 | +0.02 | 0 | ±0 |
| Forward–The Greens (Avant/Adelante–LV)^{6} | 7,332 | 0.03 | +0.02 | 0 | ±0 |
| Blank Seats (EB) | 7,072 | 0.03 | −0.02 | 0 | ±0 |
| Coalition for Melilla (CpM) | 6,857 | 0.03 | New | 0 | ±0 |
| We Are Region (Somos Región) | 4,976 | 0.02 | New | 0 | ±0 |
| Humanist Party (PH) | 4,495 | 0.02 | +0.01 | 0 | ±0 |
| We Are Valencian in Movement (UiG–Som–CUIDES) | 4,473 | 0.02 | −0.01 | 0 | ±0 |
| Left in Positive (IZQP) | 3,503 | 0.01 | New | 0 | ±0 |
| Canaries Now (ANC–UP)^{7} | 3,037 | 0.01 | +0.01 | 0 | ±0 |
| Commitment to Galicia (CxG) | 2,760 | 0.01 | New | 0 | ±0 |
| Sorian People's Platform (PPSO) | 2,663 | 0.01 | New | 0 | ±0 |
| Convergents (CNV) | 2,541 | 0.01 | New | 0 | ±0 |
| Regionalist Party of the Leonese Country (PREPAL) | 2,190 | 0.01 | +0.01 | 0 | ±0 |
| Extremadurans (CEx–CREx–PREx) | 2,150 | 0.01 | New | 0 | ±0 |
| Riojan Party (PR+) | 2,098 | 0.01 | New | 0 | ±0 |
| Libertarian Party (P–LIB) | 1,216 | 0.00 | −0.01 | 0 | ±0 |
| United Linares Independent Citizens (CILU–Linares) | 1,081 | 0.00 | New | 0 | ±0 |
| Andecha Astur (Andecha Astur) | 932 | 0.00 | New | 0 | ±0 |
| Retirees Party for the Future. Dignity and Democracy ("JF") | 876 | 0.00 | New | 0 | ±0 |
| Puyalón (PYLN) | 835 | 0.00 | New | 0 | ±0 |
| Federation of Independents of Aragon (FIA) | 785 | 0.00 | ±0.00 | 0 | ±0 |
| Spanish Phalanx of the CNSO (FE de las JONS) | 646 | 0.00 | −0.04 | 0 | ±0 |
| Feminism8 (F8) | 571 | 0.00 | New | 0 | ±0 |
| European Solidarity Action Party (Solidaria) | 528 | 0.00 | New | 0 | ±0 |
| Plural Democracy (DPL) | 504 | 0.00 | New | 0 | ±0 |
| Regionalist Union of Castile and León (Unión Regionalista) | 490 | 0.00 | New | 0 | ±0 |
| Centered (centrados) | 459 | 0.00 | New | 0 | ±0 |
| Living Ourense (VOU) | 335 | 0.00 | New | 0 | ±0 |
| Public Defense Organization (ODP) | 308 | 0.00 | New | 0 | ±0 |
| European Retirees Social Democratic Party–Centre Unity (PDSJE–UdeC) | 277 | 0.00 | New | 0 | ±0 |
| Revolutionary Anticapitalist Left (IZAR) | 257 | 0.00 | ±0.00 | 0 | ±0 |
| Andalusian Solidary Independent Republican Party (RISA) | 190 | 0.00 | New | 0 | ±0 |
| XXI Convergence (C21) | 73 | 0.00 | New | 0 | ±0 |
| Death to the System (+MAS+) | 47 | 0.00 | New | 0 | ±0 |
| Union of Everyone (UdT) | 28 | 0.00 | ±0.00 | 0 | ±0 |
| Blank ballots | 199,836 | 0.76 | +0.02 | | |
| Total | 26,201,371 | | | 350 | ±0 |
| Valid votes | 26,201,371 | 98.95 | −0.12 | | |
| Invalid votes | 276,769 | 1.05 | +0.12 | | |
| Votes cast / turnout | 26,478,140 | 71.76 | +5.28 | | |
| Abstentions | 10,420,743 | 28.24 | −5.28 | | |
| Registered voters | 36,898,883 | | | | |
Sources
Footnotes: ^{1} People's Party and Citizens–Party of the Citizenry do not include results in Navarre.; ^{2} United We Can results are compared to the combined totals of United We Can and The Valencian Way in the 2016 election.; ^{3} In Common–United We Can results are compared to Podemos–Anova–EU in the 2016 election.; ^{4} Together for Catalonia–Together results are compared to Democratic Convergence of Catalonia totals in the 2016 election.; ^{5} Sum Navarre results are compared to the combined totals of People's Party and Citizens–Party of the Citizenry in Navarre in the 2016 election.; ^{6} Forward–The Greens results are compared to The Eco-pacifist Greens totals in the 2016 election.; ^{7} Canaries Now results are compared to Unity of the People totals in the 2016 election.

Popular vote
| PSOE | 28.67% |
| PP | 16.69% |
| Cs | 15.86% |
| Unidas Podemos | 14.32% |
| Vox | 10.26% |
| ERC–Sob. | 3.91% |
| JxCat–Junts | 1.91% |
| EAJ/PNV | 1.51% |
| PACMA | 1.25% |
| EH Bildu | 0.99% |
| Compromís 2019 | 0.66% |
| CCa–PNC | 0.53% |
| NA+ | 0.41% |
| PRC | 0.20% |
| Others | 2.06% |
| Blank ballots | 0.76% |

Seats
| PSOE | 35.14% |
| PP | 18.86% |
| Cs | 16.29% |
| Unidas Podemos | 12.00% |
| Vox | 6.86% |
| ERC–Sob. | 4.29% |
| JxCat–Junts | 2.00% |
| EAJ/PNV | 1.71% |
| EH Bildu | 1.14% |
| CCa–PNC | 0.57% |
| NA+ | 0.57% |
| Compromís 2019 | 0.29% |
| PRC | 0.29% |

=== Senate ===
← Summary of the 28 April 2019 Senate of Spain election results →
| Parties and alliances | Popular vote | | | Seats | |
| Parties and alliances | Votes | % | ±pp | Total | +/− |
|---|---|---|---|---|---|
| Spanish Socialist Workers' Party (PSOE) | 21,058,377 | 29.33 | +5.75 | 123 | +80 |
| People's Party (PP)^{1} | 13,757,395 | 19.16 | −14.58 | 54 | −73 |
| Citizens–Party of the Citizenry (Cs)^{1} | 10,665,627 | 14.85 | +4.34 | 4 | +4 |
| United We Can (Unidas Podemos) | 9,171,853 | 12.77 | −6.52 | 0 | −15 |
| United We Can (Podemos–IU–Equo)^{2} | 7,091,581 | 9.67 | −5.21 | 0 | −10 |
| In Common We Can–Let's Win the Change (ECP–Guanyem el Canvi) | 1,518,006 | 2.11 | −0.94 | 0 | −4 |
| In Common–United We Can (Podemos–EU–Mareas en Común–Equo)^{3} | 562,266 | 0.74 | −0.62 | 0 | −1 |
| Vox (Vox) | 5,998,649 | 8.35 | +8.10 | 0 | ±0 |
| Republican Left of Catalonia–Sovereigntists (ERC–Sobiranistes) | 3,154,967 | 4.39 | +1.43 | 11 | +1 |
| Republican Left of Catalonia–Sovereigntists (ERC–Sobiranistes) | 3,144,383 | 4.38 | +1.42 | 11 | +1 |
| Republican Left of the Valencian Country (ERPV) | 10,584 | 0.01 | New | 0 | ±0 |
| Together for Catalonia–Together (JxCat–Junts)^{4} | 1,527,788 | 2.13 | −0.05 | 2 | ±0 |
| Animalist Party Against Mistreatment of Animals (PACMA) | 1,322,370 | 1.84 | −0.02 | 0 | ±0 |
| Basque Nationalist Party (EAJ/PNV) | 1,184,641 | 1.65 | +0.29 | 9 | +4 |
| Basque Country Gather (EH Bildu)^{1} | 647,201 | 0.90 | ±0.00 | 1 | +1 |
| Commitment: Bloc–Initiative–Greens Equo (Compromís 2019) | 574,171 | 0.80 | New | 0 | ±0 |
| Galician Nationalist Bloc (BNG) | 337,849 | 0.47 | +0.19 | 0 | ±0 |
| Sum Navarre (NA+)^{5} | 325,305 | 0.45 | −0.10 | 3 | ±0 |
| Change (Cambio/Aldaketa)^{6} | 288,947 | 0.40 | −0.15 | 0 | −1 |
| Canarian Coalition–Canarian Nationalist Party (CCa–PNC) | 236,871 | 0.33 | +0.10 | 0 | −1 |
| Free People–We Are Alternative–Pirates: Republican Front (Front Republicà) | 179,898 | 0.25 | New | 0 | ±0 |
| Zero Cuts–Green Group (Recortes Cero–GV) | 171,943 | 0.24 | −0.04 | 0 | ±0 |
| Regionalist Party of Cantabria (PRC) | 155,748 | 0.22 | New | 0 | ±0 |
| New Canaries (NCa) | 76,857 | 0.11 | New | 0 | ±0 |
| In Tide (En Marea) | 75,846 | 0.11 | New | 0 | ±0 |
| For a Fairer World (PUM+J) | 67,268 | 0.09 | New | 0 | ±0 |
| Communists (PCPE–PCPC–PCPA) | 51,948 | 0.07 | −0.04 | 0 | ±0 |
| Andalusia by Herself (AxSí) | 40,087 | 0.06 | New | 0 | ±0 |
| Blank Seats (EB) | 30,437 | 0.04 | −0.06 | 0 | ±0 |
| El Pi–Proposal for the Isles (El Pi) | 30,129 | 0.04 | New | 0 | ±0 |
| Humanist Party (PH) | 22,028 | 0.03 | +0.02 | 0 | ±0 |
| Forward–The Greens (Avant/Adelante–LV)^{7} | 21,927 | 0.03 | +0.02 | 0 | ±0 |
| Communist Party of the Workers of Spain (PCTE) | 21,814 | 0.03 | New | 0 | ±0 |
| We Are Region (Somos Región) | 21,691 | 0.03 | New | 0 | ±0 |
| Regionalist Party of the Leonese Country (PREPAL) | 14,524 | 0.02 | +0.01 | 0 | ±0 |
| Coalition for Melilla (CpM) | 13,342 | 0.02 | New | 0 | ±0 |
| We Are Valencian in Movement (UiG–Som–CUIDES) | 10,715 | 0.01 | −0.03 | 0 | ±0 |
| Commitment to Galicia (CxG) | 8,655 | 0.01 | New | 0 | ±0 |
| Riojan Party (PR+) | 8,492 | 0.01 | New | 0 | ±0 |
| Extremadurans (CEx–CREx–PREx) | 8,420 | 0.01 | New | 0 | ±0 |
| Left in Positive (IZQP) | 8,329 | 0.01 | New | 0 | ±0 |
| Canaries Now (ANC–UP)^{8} | 7,233 | 0.01 | +0.01 | 0 | ±0 |
| Retirees Party for the Future. Dignity and Democracy ("JF") | 5,905 | 0.01 | New | 0 | ±0 |
| Gomera Socialist Group (ASG) | 5,611 | 0.01 | ±0.00 | 1 | ±0 |
| Andecha Astur (Andecha Astur) | 5,600 | 0.01 | New | 0 | ±0 |
| Sorian People's Platform (PPSO) | 5,410 | 0.01 | New | 0 | ±0 |
| Convergents (CNV) | 4,931 | 0.01 | New | 0 | ±0 |
| More for Menorca (MxMe) | 4,524 | 0.01 | New | 0 | ±0 |
| Federation of Independents of Aragon (FIA) | 4,191 | 0.01 | +0.01 | 0 | ±0 |
| United Linares Independent Citizens (CILU–Linares) | 2,582 | 0.00 | New | 0 | ±0 |
| Puyalón (PYLN) | 2,300 | 0.00 | New | 0 | ±0 |
| Win Fuerteventura (PPMAJO–UP Majorero) | 2,275 | 0.00 | New | 0 | ±0 |
| Regionalist Union of Castile and León (Unión Regionalista) | 2,021 | 0.00 | New | 0 | ±0 |
| Centered (centrados) | 1,965 | 0.00 | New | 0 | ±0 |
| Spanish Phalanx of the CNSO (FE de las JONS) | 1,835 | 0.00 | −0.05 | 0 | ±0 |
| Libertarian Party (P–LIB) | 1,673 | 0.00 | −0.01 | 0 | ±0 |
| Plural Democracy (DPL) | 1,430 | 0.00 | New | 0 | ±0 |
| Feminism8 (F8) | 1,405 | 0.00 | New | 0 | ±0 |
| European Solidarity Action Party (Solidaria) | 1,314 | 0.00 | New | 0 | ±0 |
| Now Ibiza and Formentera (Ara) | 1,302 | 0.00 | New | 0 | ±0 |
| Life and Autonomy (VIA) | 1,231 | 0.00 | New | 0 | ±0 |
| Andalusian Solidary Independent Republican Party (RISA) | 1,189 | 0.00 | New | 0 | ±0 |
| Public Defense Organization (ODP) | 1,090 | 0.00 | New | 0 | ±0 |
| Proposal for Ibiza (PxE) | 681 | 0.00 | New | 0 | ±0 |
| United for Lanzarote (UPLanzarote) | 456 | 0.00 | New | 0 | ±0 |
| XXI Convergence (C21) | 234 | 0.00 | New | 0 | ±0 |
| Federation Free Socialist Party (PSLF) | 135 | 0.00 | New | 0 | ±0 |
| Blank ballots (Note: The percentage of blank ballots is calculated over the official number of valid votes cast, irrespective of the total number of votes shown as a result of adding up the individual results for each party.) | 439,543 | 1.71 | −0.71 | | |
| Total | 71,800,175 | | | 208 | ±0 |
| Valid votes | 25,637,370 | 97.42 | −0.05 | | |
| Invalid votes | 680,156 | 2.58 | +0.05 | | |
| Votes cast / turnout | 26,317,526 | 71.32 | +5.61 | | |
| Abstentions | 10,581,357 | 28.68 | −5.61 | | |
| Registered voters | 36,898,883 | | | | |
Sources
Footnotes: ^{1} People's Party, Citizens–Party of the Citizenry and Basque Country Gather do not include results in Navarre.; ^{2} United We Can results are compared to the combined totals of United We Can and The Valencian Way in the 2016 election, not including results in Navarre.; ^{3} In Common–United We Can results are compared to Podemos–Anova–EU in the 2016 election.; ^{4} Together for Catalonia–Together results are compared to Democratic Convergence of Catalonia totals in the 2016 election.; ^{5} Sum Navarre results are compared to the combined totals of People's Party and Citizens–Party of the Citizenry in Navarre in the 2016 election.; ^{6} Change results are compared to the combined totals of United We Can, Basque Country Gather and Yes to Navarre in Navarre in the 2016 election.; ^{7} Forward–The Greens results are compared to The Eco-pacifist Greens totals in the 2016 election.; ^{8} Canaries Now results are compared to Unity of the People totals in the 2016 election.

Popular vote
| PSOE | 29.33% |
| PP | 19.16% |
| Cs | 14.85% |
| Unidas Podemos | 12.77% |
| Vox | 8.35% |
| ERC–Sob. | 4.39% |
| JxCat–Junts | 2.13% |
| PACMA | 1.84% |
| EAJ/PNV | 1.65% |
| EH Bildu | 0.90% |
| NA+ | 0.45% |
| ASG | 0.01% |
| Others | 3.54% |
| Blank ballots | 1.71% |

Seats
| PSOE | 59.13% |
| PP | 25.96% |
| ERC–Sob. | 5.29% |
| EAJ/PNV | 4.33% |
| Cs | 1.92% |
| NA+ | 1.44% |
| JxCat–Junts | 0.96% |
| EH Bildu | 0.48% |
| ASG | 0.48% |

=== Maps ===
Election results by constituency (Congress).

Vote winner strength by constituency (Congress).

Vote winner strength by autonomous community (Congress).

== Aftermath ==
=== Outcome ===
The election resulted in a victory for Pedro Sánchez's Spanish Socialist Workers' Party (PSOE)—its first since the 2008 general election—which swept the country and won in most constituencies and regions. The right-wing bloc of PP–Cs–Vox was only able to garner 42.9% of the vote and 147 Congress seats (149 including the Navarra Suma alliance in Navarre) to the 165 seats and 43.0% vote share garnered by the two major left-wing parties, PSOE and Unidas Podemos. Even though the left-wing bloc was still 11 seats short of a majority, the three-way split on the centre-right ensured Sánchez's PSOE would be the only party that could realistically garner enough support from third parties to command a majority in the lower house. The PSOE also obtained an absolute majority of seats in the Senate for the first time since 1989 as the PP vote collapsed. Having initially been allocated 121 senators, it was awarded two additional senators from PP after the counting of CERA votes, the Census of Absent-Residents, namely one for Zamora and one for Segovia.

Support for the People's Party (PP) plummeted and scored the worst result of its history as well as the worst support for any of the party's incarnations since the People's Alliance results in the 1977 and 1979 elections. The PP was only able to remain the most voted party in five constituencies: Ávila, Lugo, Melilla, Ourense and Salamanca; and it was not able to remain the largest party in any region, including Galicia, where it lost to the PSOE for the first time ever in any kind of election. Overall, the party lost 3.6 million votes from 2016, with post-election analysis determining that 1.4 million had been lost to Albert Rivera's Citizens party, 1.6 million to far-right Vox, 400,000 to abstentions and a further 300,000 to PSOE.

Scoring below previous expectations throughout the campaign, Vox's result signalled the first time since Blas Piñar's election as a deputy for the National Union coalition in 1979 that a far-right party had won seats in the Spanish Parliament after the country's return to democracy as well as the first time that a far-right party would be able to form a parliamentary group of its own in the Congress of Deputies.

After losing more than a half of their seats, the PP sacked Javier Maroto as their campaign manager. Maroto had also failed to hold his seat from Álava in the election, losing it to EH Bildu and signalling the first time since 1979 that the party had not won a seat in the province. Pablo Casado, the PP leader whose right-wing stance and controversial leadership had been labelled by commentators as a "suicide" in light of election results, refused to resign and instead proposed a sudden U-turn of the party back into the centre under pressure from party regional leaders one month ahead of the regional and local elections, while also raising a hostile profile to both Cs and Vox, attacking them for dividing the vote to the right-of-centre.

=== Government formation ===
Investiture; Congress of Deputies; Nomination of Pedro Sánchez (PSOE)
| Ballot → | 23 July 2019 | 25 July 2019 |
| Required majority → | 176 out of 350 | Simple |
| Yes: • PSOE (123); • PRC (1) | 124 / 350 | 124 / 350 |
| No: • PP (66); • Cs (57); • Vox (24); • ERC (14) (on 23 Jul); • JxCat (4); • CCa (2); • UPN (2); • UP–ECP–GeC (1) (on 23 Jul) | 170 / 350 | 155 / 350 |
| Abstentions: • UP–ECP–GeC (42) (41 on 23 Jul); • ERC (14) (on 25 Jul); • PNV (6); • EH Bildu (4); • Compromís (1) | 52 / 350 | 67 / 350 |
| Absentees: • JxCat (3); • ERC (1) | 4 / 350 | 4 / 350 |

== Bibliography ==
Legislation

- Constitución Española (Constitution). Official State Gazette (in Spanish). 27 December 1978 [version as of 27 September 2011]. BOE-A-1978-31229.
- Ley Orgánica 5/1985, de 19 de junio, del Régimen Electoral General (Organic Law 5/1985). Official State Gazette (in Spanish). 19 June 1985 [version as of 30 January 2019]. BOE-A-1985-11672.
- Real Decreto 129/2019, de 4 de marzo, de disolución del Congreso de los Diputados y del Senado y de convocatoria de elecciones (Royal Decree 129/2019). Official State Gazette (in Spanish). 4 March 2019. BOE-A-2019-3109.

Other

- Carreras de Odriozola, Albert; Tafunell Sambola, Xavier (2005) [1989]. Estadísticas históricas de España, siglos XIX-XX (PDF) (in Spanish). Vol. 1 (II ed.). Bilbao: Fundación BBVA. pp. 1072–1097. ISBN 84-96515-00-1. Archived from the original (PDF) on 24 September 2015.
