= Segovia (Congress of Deputies constituency) =

Electoral constituency in Spain

Coordinates: 41°10′N 4°00′W

- Congress of Deputies; Electoral constituency
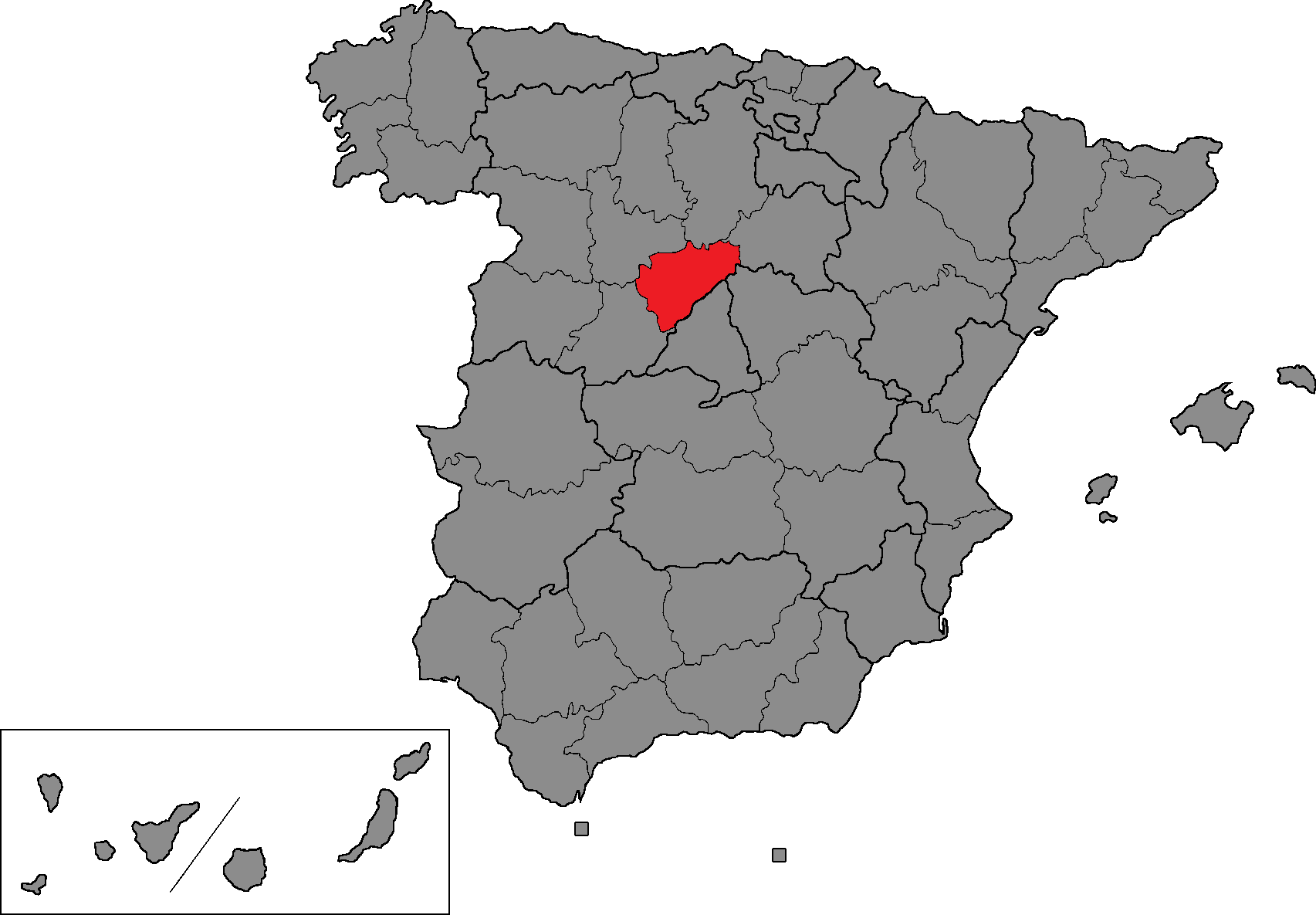
- Location of Segovia within Spain
- Province: Segovia
- Autonomous community: Castile and León
- Population: ▲156,788 (2024)
- Electorate: ▼119,454 (2023)
- Major settlements: Segovia

Current constituency
- Created: 1977
- Seats: 3
- Members: PP (2); PSOE (1)

Segovia is one of the 52 constituencies represented in the Congress of Deputies, the lower chamber of the Spanish parliament, the Cortes Generales. The constituency (whose boundaries correspond to those of the homonymous province) currently elects four deputies. The electoral system uses the D'Hondt method and closed-list proportional voting, with a minimum threshold of three percent.

== Electoral system ==
The constituency was created as per the Political Reform Law and was first contested in the 1977 general election. The Law provided for the provinces of Spain to be established as multi-member districts in the Congress of Deputies, with this regulation being maintained under the Spanish Constitution of 1978. Additionally, the Constitution requires for any modification of the provincial limits to be approved under an organic law, needing an absolute majority in the Cortes Generales.

Voting is based on universal suffrage, comprising all Spanish nationals over 18 years of age with full political rights, provided that they have not been deprived of the right to vote by a final sentence. The only exception was in 1977, when this was limited to nationals over 21 years of age and in full enjoyment of their political and civil rights. Amendments in 2011 required non-resident citizens to apply for voting, a system known as "begged" voting (Spanish: Voto rogado). which was abolished in 2022. Further, amendments in 2018 granted the right to vote to those legally incapacitated. The Congress of Deputies has a minimum of 300 and a maximum of 400 seats, with electoral provisions fixing its size at 350. Of these, 348 are elected in 50 multi-member constituencies corresponding to the provinces of Spain—each of which is assigned an initial minimum of two seats and the remaining 248 distributed in proportion to population—using the D'Hondt method and closed-list proportional voting, with a three percent-threshold of valid votes (including blank ballots) in each constituency. The remaining two seats are allocated to Ceuta and Melilla as single-member districts elected by plurality voting. The use of this electoral method may result in a higher effective threshold depending on district magnitude and vote distribution. The law does not provide for by-elections to fill vacant seats; instead, any vacancies arising after the proclamation of candidates and during the legislative term are filled by the next candidates on the party lists or, when required, by designated substitutes.

The electoral law allows for parties and federations registered in the interior ministry, alliances and groupings of electors to present lists of candidates. Parties and federations intending to form an alliance are required to inform the relevant electoral commission within 10 days of the election call—15 before 1985—whereas groupings of electors need to secure the signature of at least one percent of the electorate in the constituencies for which they seek election—one permille of the electorate, with a compulsory minimum of 500 signatures, until 1985—disallowing electors from signing for more than one list. Also since 2011, parties, federations or alliances that have not obtained a mandate in either chamber of the Cortes at the preceding election are required to secure the signature of at least 0.1 percent of electors in the aforementioned constituencies. Amendments in 2007 required a balanced composition of men and women in the electoral lists, so that candidates of either sex made up at least 40 percent of the total composition; further amendments in 2024 required the use of a zipper system.

== Deputies ==
Deputies 1977–present
Key to parties PSOE CDS Cs UCD PP CP AP Vox
Legislature	Election	Distribution
Constituent	1977	1 / 2
1st	1979	1 / 2
2nd	1982	1 / 2
3rd	1986	1 / 1 / 1
4th	1989	1 / 2
5th	1993	1 / 2
6th	1996	1 / 2
7th	2000	1 / 2
8th	2004	1 / 2
9th	2008	1 / 2
10th	2011	1 / 2
11th	2015	1 / 2
12th	2016	1 / 2
13th	2019 (Apr)	1 / 1 / 1
14th	2019 (Nov)	1 / 1 / 1
15th	2023	1 / 2

== General elections ==
=== 2026 ===
Summary of the 29 November 2026 Congress of Deputies election results in Segovia
Parties and alliances	Popular vote			Seats	
Parties and alliances	Votes	%	±pp	Total	+/−
People's Party (PP)					
Spanish Socialist Workers' Party (PSOE)					
Vox (Vox)					
Broad Front (FA)^{1}			n/a		
We Can (Podemos)^{1}			n/a		
Animalist Party with the Environment (PACMA)					
Workers' Front (FO)					
For a Fairer World (M+J)					
Communist Party of the Workers of Spain (PCTE)					
The Party is Over (SALF)			New		
Blank ballots					
Total				3	±0
Valid votes					
Invalid votes					
Votes cast / turnout					
Abstentions					
Registered voters	121,460				
Sources
Footnotes: ^{1} Within the Unite alliance in the 2023 election.

=== 2023 ===
Summary of the 23 July 2023 Congress of Deputies election results in Segovia
Parties and alliances	Popular vote			Seats	
Parties and alliances	Votes	%	±pp	Total	+/−
People's Party (PP)	39,894	45.02	+12.03	2	+1
Spanish Socialist Workers' Party (PSOE)	27,113	30.60	+0.93	1	±0
Vox (Vox)	12,510	14.12	–3.01	0	–1
Unite (Sumar)^{1}	7,137	8.05	–1.24	0	±0
Animalist Party with the Environment (PACMA)^{2}	307	0.35	–0.19	0	±0
Seniors in Action (3e)	198	0.22	New	0	±0
Workers' Front (FO)	183	0.21	New	0	±0
For a Fairer World (PUM+J)	136	0.15	–0.01	0	±0
Walking Together (CJ)	102	0.12	New	0	±0
Communist Party of the Workers of Spain (PCTE)	94	0.11	+0.03	0	±0
Zero Cuts (Recortes Cero)	64	0.07	–0.15	0	±0
Blank ballots	875	0.99	–0.19		
Total	88,613			3	±0
Valid votes	88,613	98.52	+0.15		
Invalid votes	1,332	1.48	–0.15		
Votes cast / turnout	89,945	75.30	+2.95		
Abstentions	29,509	24.70	–2.95		
Registered voters	119,454				
Sources
Footnotes: ^{1} Unite results are compared to United We Can totals in the November 2019 election.; ^{2} Animalist Party with the Environment results are compared to Animalist Party Against Mistreatment of Animals totals in the November 2019 election.

=== November 2019 ===
Summary of the 10 November 2019 Congress of Deputies election results in Segovia
Parties and alliances	Popular vote			Seats	
Parties and alliances	Votes	%	±pp	Total	+/−
People's Party (PP)	28,057	32.99	+6.12	1	±0
Spanish Socialist Workers' Party (PSOE)	25,233	29.67	+1.47	1	±0
Vox (Vox)	14,569	17.13	+4.73	1	+1
United We Can (Podemos–IU)	7,901	9.29	–0.36	0	±0
Citizens–Party of the Citizenry (Cs)	6,861	8.07	–11.89	0	–1
Animalist Party Against Mistreatment of Animals (PACMA)	462	0.54	–0.12	0	±0
Centered (centrados)	234	0.28	–0.22	0	±0
Zero Cuts–Green Group–PCAS–TC (Recortes Cero–GV–PCAS–TC)	191	0.22	+0.02	0	±0
Spanish Communist Workers' Party (PCOE)	173	0.20	±0.00	0	±0
For a Fairer World (PUM+J)	133	0.16	+0.02	0	±0
European Retirees Social Democratic Party (PDSJE)	115	0.14	New	0	±0
Communist Party of the Workers of Spain (PCTE)	67	0.08	–0.02	0	±0
Libertarian Party (P–LIB)	38	0.04	New	0	±0
Blank ballots	1,005	1.18	+0.34		
Total	85,039			3	±0
Valid votes	85,039	98.37	–0.06		
Invalid votes	1,412	1.63	+0.06		
Votes cast / turnout	86,451	72.35	–6.22		
Abstentions	33,041	27.65	+6.22		
Registered voters	119,492				

=== April 2019 ===
Summary of the 28 April 2019 Congress of Deputies election results in Segovia
Parties and alliances	Popular vote			Seats	
Parties and alliances	Votes	%	±pp	Total	+/−
Spanish Socialist Workers' Party (PSOE)	26,088	28.20	+6.72	1	±0
People's Party (PP)	24,853	26.87	–18.51	1	–1
Citizens–Party of the Citizenry (Cs)	18,460	19.96	+4.60	1	+1
Vox (Vox)	11,468	12.40	+12.09	0	±0
United We Can (Podemos–IU–Equo)	8,931	9.65	–5.53	0	±0
Animalist Party Against Mistreatment of Animals (PACMA)	611	0.66	–0.03	0	±0
Centered (centrados)	459	0.50	New	0	±0
Act (PACT)	276	0.30	New	0	±0
Spanish Communist Workers' Party (PCOE)	184	0.20	New	0	±0
Zero Cuts–Green Group–PCAS–TC (Recortes Cero–GV–PCAS–TC)	183	0.20	–0.03	0	±0
For a Fairer World (PUM+J)	127	0.14	New	0	±0
Communist Party of the Workers of Spain (PCTE)	89	0.10	New	0	±0
Blank ballots	779	0.84	+0.15		
Total	92,508			3	±0
Valid votes	92,508	98.43	–0.30		
Invalid votes	1,478	1.57	+0.30		
Votes cast / turnout	93,986	78.57	+4.36		
Abstentions	25,630	21.43	–4.36		
Registered voters	119,616				

=== 2016 ===
Summary of the 26 June 2016 Congress of Deputies election results in Segovia
Parties and alliances	Popular vote			Seats	
Parties and alliances	Votes	%	±pp	Total	+/−
People's Party (PP)	40,172	45.38	+5.98	2	±0
Spanish Socialist Workers' Party (PSOE)	19,014	21.48	–0.05	1	±0
Citizens–Party of the Citizenry (C's)	13,595	15.36	–1.70	0	±0
United We Can (Podemos–IU–Equo–Segoviemos)^{1}	13,440	15.18	–3.20	0	±0
Animalist Party Against Mistreatment of Animals (PACMA)	612	0.69	+0.13	0	±0
Union, Progress and Democracy (UPyD)	352	0.40	–0.99	0	±0
Vox (Vox)	277	0.31	New	0	±0
Zero Cuts–Green Group (Recortes Cero–GV)	202	0.23	–0.02	0	±0
Spanish Phalanx of the CNSO (FE de las JONS)	129	0.15	–0.09	0	±0
Communist Party of the Peoples of Spain (PCPE)	117	0.13	–0.08	0	±0
Blank ballots	615	0.69	–0.29		
Total	88,525			3	±0
Valid votes	88,525	98.73	+0.13		
Invalid votes	1,137	1.27	–0.13		
Votes cast / turnout	89,662	74.21	–2.49		
Abstentions	31,161	25.79	+2.49		
Registered voters	120,823				
Sources
Footnotes: ^{1} United We Can results are compared to the combined totals of We Can and United Left–Popular Unity in Common–Segoviemos in the 2015 election.

=== 2015 ===
Summary of the 20 December 2015 Congress of Deputies election results in Segovia
Parties and alliances	Popular vote			Seats	
Parties and alliances	Votes	%	±pp	Total	+/−
People's Party (PP)	36,182	39.40	–17.01	2	±0
Spanish Socialist Workers' Party (PSOE)	19,769	21.53	–5.26	1	±0
Citizens–Party of the Citizenry (C's)	15,665	17.06	New	0	±0
We Can (Podemos)	13,144	14.31	New	0	±0
United Left–Popular Unity in Common–Segoviemos (IU–UPeC–Segoviemos)	3,742	4.07	–1.59	0	±0
Union, Progress and Democracy (UPyD)	1,274	1.39	–5.25	0	±0
Animalist Party Against Mistreatment of Animals (PACMA)	517	0.56	+0.18	0	±0
Zero Cuts–Green Group (Recortes Cero–GV)	227	0.25	New	0	±0
Spanish Phalanx of the CNSO (FE de las JONS)	223	0.24	–0.03	0	±0
Communist Party of the Peoples of Spain (PCPE)	190	0.21	New	0	±0
Blank ballots	903	0.98	–0.62		
Total	91,836			3	±0
Valid votes	91,836	98.60	+0.49		
Invalid votes	1,303	1.40	–0.49		
Votes cast / turnout	93,139	76.70	+0.36		
Abstentions	28,301	23.30	–0.36		
Registered voters	121,440				

=== 2011 ===
Summary of the 20 November 2011 Congress of Deputies election results in Segovia
Parties and alliances	Popular vote			Seats	
Parties and alliances	Votes	%	±pp	Total	+/−
People's Party (PP)	52,173	56.41	+2.98	2	±0
Spanish Socialist Workers' Party (PSOE)	24,780	26.79	–12.26	1	±0
Union, Progress and Democracy (UPyD)	6,889	7.45	+5.82	0	±0
United Left of Castile and León: Plural Left (IUCyL)	5,237	5.66	+3.00	0	±0
Equo (Equo)	981	1.06	New	0	±0
Animalist Party Against Mistreatment of Animals (PACMA)	353	0.38	+0.24	0	±0
Spanish Phalanx of the CNSO (FE de las JONS)	247	0.27	+0.20	0	±0
For a Fairer World (PUM+J)	237	0.26	+0.16	0	±0
Communist Unification of Spain (UCE)	115	0.12	New	0	±0
Blank ballots	1,477	1.60	+0.31		
Total	92,489			3	±0
Valid votes	92,489	98.11	–1.07		
Invalid votes	1,780	1.89	+1.07		
Votes cast / turnout	94,269	76.34	–4.77		
Abstentions	29,212	23.66	+4.77		
Registered voters	123,481				

=== 2008 ===
Summary of the 9 March 2008 Congress of Deputies election results in Segovia
Parties and alliances	Popular vote			Seats	
Parties and alliances	Votes	%	±pp	Total	+/−
People's Party (PP)	53,399	53.43	+0.98	2	±0
Spanish Socialist Workers' Party (PSOE)	39,023	39.05	–0.89	1	±0
United Left–Alternative (IU)	2,657	2.66	–0.81	0	±0
Union, Progress and Democracy (UPyD)	1,631	1.63	New	0	±0
The Greens (Verdes)	560	0.56	New	0	±0
Commoners' Land (TC)	329	0.33	–0.13	0	±0
Anti-Bullfighting Party Against Mistreatment of Animals (PACMA)	140	0.14	New	0	±0
Citizens–Party of the Citizenry (C's)	99	0.10	New	0	±0
For a Fairer World (PUM+J)	98	0.10	New	0	±0
Alternative in Blank (ABLA)	97	0.10	New	0	±0
Social Democratic Party (PSD)	94	0.09	New	0	±0
Citizens for Blank Votes (CenB)	89	0.09	–0.34	0	±0
National Democracy (DN)	87	0.09	+0.04	0	±0
Communist Party of the Castilian People (PCPC–PCPE)	78	0.08	–0.01	0	±0
Spanish Phalanx of the CNSO (FE de las JONS)	67	0.07	±0.00	0	±0
Family and Life Party (PFyV)	42	0.04	New	0	±0
Centrist Party (PCTR)	34	0.03	New	0	±0
Authentic Phalanx (FA)	29	0.03	±0.00	0	±0
Spanish Alternative (AES)	25	0.03	New	0	±0
Humanist Party (PH)	22	0.02	–0.10	0	±0
Spanish Front (Frente)	20	0.02	New	0	±0
Spain 2000 (E–2000)	16	0.02	New	0	±0
Carlist Traditionalist Communion (CTC)	9	0.01	New	0	±0
Blank ballots	1,292	1.29	–0.89		
Total	99,937			3	±0
Valid votes	99,937	99.18	+0.16		
Invalid votes	822	0.82	–0.16		
Votes cast / turnout	100,759	81.11	±0.00		
Abstentions	23,467	18.89	±0.00		
Registered voters	124,226				

=== 2004 ===
Summary of the 14 March 2004 Congress of Deputies election results in Segovia
Parties and alliances	Popular vote			Seats	
Parties and alliances	Votes	%	±pp	Total	+/−
People's Party (PP)	52,500	52.45	–5.03	2	±0
Spanish Socialist Workers' Party (PSOE)	39,976	39.94	+9.09	1	±0
United Left (IU)	3,470	3.47	–1.71	0	±0
Commoners' Land–Castilian Nationalist Party (TC–PNC)	464	0.46	–0.19	0	±0
Citizens for Blank Votes (CenB)	433	0.43	New	0	±0
Democratic and Social Centre (CDS)	241	0.24	–1.25	0	±0
Family and Life Party (PFyV)	191	0.19	New	0	±0
Humanist Party (PH)	119	0.12	+0.04	0	±0
Republican Left (IR)	104	0.10	New	0	±0
Spanish Democratic Party (PADE)	95	0.09	–0.06	0	±0
Communist Party of the Castilian People (PCPC–PCPE)	89	0.09	New	0	±0
Spanish Phalanx of the CNSO (FE de las JONS)	67	0.07	New	0	±0
National Democracy (DN)	49	0.05	New	0	±0
The Phalanx (FE)	48	0.05	–0.09	0	±0
Authentic Phalanx (FA)	34	0.03	New	0	±0
Republican Social Movement (MSR)	33	0.03	New	0	±0
Blank ballots	2,183	2.18	–0.17		
Total	100,096			3	±0
Valid votes	100,096	99.02	+0.12		
Invalid votes	995	0.98	–0.12		
Votes cast / turnout	101,091	81.11	+5.50		
Abstentions	23,547	18.89	–5.50		
Registered voters	124,638				

=== 2000 ===
Summary of the 12 March 2000 Congress of Deputies election results in Segovia
Parties and alliances	Popular vote			Seats	
Parties and alliances	Votes	%	±pp	Total	+/−
People's Party (PP)	54,367	57.48	+2.72	2	±0
Spanish Socialist Workers' Party–Progressives (PSOE–p)	29,178	30.85	–1.39	1	±0
United Left (IU)	4,898	5.18	–3.72	0	±0
Centrist Union–Democratic and Social Centre (UC–CDS)	1,407	1.49	+0.49	0	±0
The Greens–Green Group (LV–GV)	1,143	1.21	+0.36	0	±0
Commoners' Land–Castilian Nationalist Party (TC–PNC)	613	0.65	+0.40	0	±0
Regionalist Unity of Castile and León (URCL)	236	0.25	+0.10	0	±0
Spanish Democratic Party (PADE)	145	0.15	New	0	±0
The Phalanx (FE)	128	0.14	New	0	±0
Natural Law Party (PLN)	87	0.09	New	0	±0
Humanist Party (PH)	75	0.08	–0.01	0	±0
Spain 2000 Platform (ES2000)	55	0.06	New	0	±0
Carlist Party (PC)	29	0.03	New	0	±0
Blank ballots	2,223	2.35	+0.82		
Total	94,584			3	±0
Valid votes	94,584	98.90	–0.34		
Invalid votes	1,050	1.10	+0.34		
Votes cast / turnout	95,634	75.61	–4.63		
Abstentions	30,850	24.39	+4.63		
Registered voters	126,484				

=== 1996 ===
Summary of the 3 March 1996 Congress of Deputies election results in Segovia
Parties and alliances	Popular vote			Seats	
Parties and alliances	Votes	%	±pp	Total	+/−
People's Party (PP)	54,188	54.76	+6.76	2	±0
Spanish Socialist Workers' Party (PSOE)	31,903	32.24	–0.05	1	±0
United Left of Castile and León (IUCL)	8,808	8.90	+1.49	0	±0
Centrist Union (UC)	990	1.00	–8.00	0	±0
The Greens–Green Group (LV–GV)	840	0.85	New	0	±0
Commoners' Land–Castilian Nationalist Party (TC–PNC)	249	0.25	+0.10	0	±0
Regionalist Unity of Castile and León (URCL)	144	0.15	±0.00	0	±0
Authentic Spanish Phalanx (FEA)	98	0.10	New	0	±0
Humanist Party (PH)	90	0.09	±0.00	0	±0
Workers' Revolutionary Party (PRT)	84	0.08	New	0	±0
Republican Coalition (CR)	56	0.06	New	0	±0
Blank ballots	1,514	1.53	+0.23		
Total	98,964			3	±0
Valid votes	98,964	99.24	+0.18		
Invalid votes	762	0.76	–0.18		
Votes cast / turnout	99,726	80.24	+0.89		
Abstentions	24,565	19.76	–0.89		
Registered voters	124,291				

=== 1993 ===
Summary of the 6 June 1993 Congress of Deputies election results in Segovia
Parties and alliances	Popular vote			Seats	
Parties and alliances	Votes	%	±pp	Total	+/−
People's Party (PP)	46,001	48.00	+8.12	2	±0
Spanish Socialist Workers' Party (PSOE)	30,945	32.29	+1.61	1	±0
Democratic and Social Centre (CDS)	8,628	9.00	–7.49	0	±0
United Left of Castile and León (IU)	7,104	7.41	+0.28	0	±0
The Greens (Verdes)^{1}	854	0.89	–0.01	0	±0
The Ecologists (LE)	347	0.36	–0.72	0	±0
Ruiz-Mateos Group–European Democratic Alliance (ARM–ADE)	237	0.25	–0.44	0	±0
Commoners' Land–Castilian Nationalist Party (TC–PNC)	141	0.15	New	0	±0
Regionalist Unity of Castile and León (URCL)	140	0.15	New	0	±0
Humanist Party (PH)	86	0.09	–0.22	0	±0
Natural Law Party (PLN)	73	0.08	New	0	±0
Party of El Bierzo (PB)	28	0.03	New	0	±0
Communist Unification of Spain (UCE)	0	0.00	New	0	±0
Blank ballots	1,249	1.30	–0.09		
Total	95,833			3	±0
Valid votes	95,833	99.06	+0.45		
Invalid votes	912	0.94	–0.45		
Votes cast / turnout	96,745	79.35	+3.60		
Abstentions	25,183	20.65	–3.60		
Registered voters	121,928				
Sources
Footnotes: ^{1} The Greens results are compared to The Greens–Green List totals in the 1989 election.

=== 1989 ===
Summary of the 29 October 1989 Congress of Deputies election results in Segovia
Parties and alliances	Popular vote			Seats	
Parties and alliances	Votes	%	±pp	Total	+/−
People's Party (PP)^{1}	35,705	39.88	+3.52	2	+1
Spanish Socialist Workers' Party (PSOE)	27,468	30.68	–1.71	1	±0
Democratic and Social Centre (CDS)	14,764	16.49	–6.99	0	–1
United Left (IU)	6,387	7.13	+4.67	0	±0
The Ecologist Greens (LVE)	967	1.08	New	0	±0
The Greens–Green List (LV–LV)	802	0.90	New	0	±0
Ruiz-Mateos Group (Ruiz-Mateos)	616	0.69	New	0	±0
Workers' Socialist Party (PST)	518	0.58	–0.02	0	±0
Workers' Party of Spain–Communist Unity (PTE–UC)^{2}	283	0.32	–0.50	0	±0
Humanist Party (PH)	278	0.31	New	0	±0
Communist Party of the Peoples of Spain (PCPE)	163	0.18	New	0	±0
Alliance for the Republic (AxR)^{3}	137	0.15	–0.06	0	±0
Centrist Unity–Democratic Spanish Party (PED)	110	0.12	New	0	±0
Spanish Phalanx of the CNSO (FE–JONS)	109	0.12	–0.09	0	±0
Blank ballots	1,230	1.37	+0.09		
Total	89,537			3	±0
Valid votes	89,537	98.61	+1.18		
Invalid votes	1,261	1.39	–1.18		
Votes cast / turnout	90,798	75.75	–3.44		
Abstentions	29,070	24.25	+3.44		
Registered voters	119,868				
Sources
Footnotes: ^{1} People's Party results are compared to People's Coalition totals in the 1986 election.; ^{2} Workers' Party of Spain–Communist Unity results are compared to Communists' Unity Board totals in the 1986 election.; ^{3} Alliance for the Republic results are compared to Internationalist Socialist Workers' Party totals in the 1986 election.

=== 1986 ===
Summary of the 22 June 1986 Congress of Deputies election results in Segovia
Parties and alliances	Popular vote			Seats	
Parties and alliances	Votes	%	±pp	Total	+/−
People's Coalition (AP–PDP–PL)^{1}	32,785	36.36	–1.95	1	–1
Spanish Socialist Workers' Party (PSOE)	29,204	32.39	–4.72	1	±0
Democratic and Social Centre (CDS)	21,170	23.48	+15.96	1	+1
United Left (IU)^{2}	2,218	2.46	+1.00	0	±0
Democratic Reformist Party (PRD)	1,126	1.25	New	0	±0
Communists' Unity Board (MUC)	736	0.82	New	0	±0
Workers' Socialist Party (PST)	542	0.60	–0.56	0	±0
Communist Unification of Spain (UCE)	266	0.30	+0.15	0	±0
Christian Spanish Party (PAEC)	254	0.28	New	0	±0
Spanish Phalanx of the CNSO (FE–JONS)	188	0.21	New	0	±0
Internationalist Socialist Workers' Party (POSI)	186	0.21	New	0	±0
Party of the Communists of Catalonia (PCC)	179	0.20	New	0	±0
Republican Popular Unity (UPR)	155	0.17	New	0	±0
Blank ballots	1,152	1.28	+0.29		
Total	90,161			3	±0
Valid votes	90,161	97.43	–0.34		
Invalid votes	2,379	2.57	+0.34		
Votes cast / turnout	92,540	79.19	–5.16		
Abstentions	24,314	20.81	+5.16		
Registered voters	116,854				
Sources
Footnotes: ^{1} People's Coalition results are compared to People's Alliance–People's Democratic Party totals in the 1982 election.; ^{2} United Left results are compared to Communist Party of Spain totals in the 1982 election.

=== 1982 ===
Summary of the 28 October 1982 Congress of Deputies election results in Segovia
Parties and alliances	Popular vote			Seats	
Parties and alliances	Votes	%	±pp	Total	+/−
People's Alliance–People's Democratic Party (AP–PDP)^{1}	35,483	38.31	+31.75	2	+2
Spanish Socialist Workers' Party (PSOE)	34,375	37.11	+14.03	1	±0
Union of the Democratic Centre (UCD)	9,680	10.45	–48.85	0	–2
Democratic and Social Centre (CDS)	6,967	7.52	New	0	±0
Spanish Ruralist Party (PRE)	1,984	2.14	–1.36	0	±0
Communist Party of Spain (PCE)	1,348	1.46	–2.68	0	±0
Workers' Socialist Party (PST)	1,074	1.16	New	0	±0
New Force (FN)^{2}	413	0.45	–0.69	0	±0
Communist Unification of Spain (UCE)	142	0.15	New	0	±0
Communist League–Internationalist Socialist Workers' Coalition (LC (COSI))	122	0.13	New	0	±0
Communist Unity Candidacy (CUC)	112	0.12	New	0	±0
Revolutionary Communist League (LCR)	0	0.00	New	0	±0
Communist Movement of Castile and León (MC–CL)	0	0.00	–0.64	0	±0
Blank ballots	919	0.99	+0.31		
Total	92,619			3	±0
Valid votes	92,619	97.77	–1.01		
Invalid votes	2,115	2.23	+1.01		
Votes cast / turnout	94,734	84.35	+8.66		
Abstentions	17,582	15.65	–8.66		
Registered voters	112,316				
Sources
Footnotes: ^{1} People's Alliance–People's Democratic Party results are compared to Democratic Coalition totals in the 1979 election.; ^{2} New Force results are compared to National Union totals in the 1979 election.

=== 1979 ===
Summary of the 1 March 1979 Congress of Deputies election results in Segovia
Parties and alliances	Popular vote			Seats	
Parties and alliances	Votes	%	±pp	Total	+/−
Union of the Democratic Centre (UCD)	49,375	59.30	+0.54	2	±0
Spanish Socialist Workers' Party (PSOE)^{1}	19,216	23.08	–4.43	1	±0
Democratic Coalition (CD)^{2}	5,458	6.56	–2.10	0	±0
Communist Party of Spain (PCE)	3,450	4.14	+1.68	0	±0
Spanish Ruralist Party (PRE)	2,912	3.50	New	0	±0
National Union (UN)	948	1.14	New	0	±0
Communist Movement–Organization of Communist Left (MC–OIC)	532	0.64	New	0	±0
Party of Labour of Spain (PTE)^{3}	306	0.37	–0.05	0	±0
Workers' Revolutionary Organization (ORT)	299	0.36	New	0	±0
Spanish Phalanx of the CNSO (Authentic) (FE–JONS(A))	195	0.23	–0.84	0	±0
Blank ballots	567	0.68	+0.25		
Total	83,258			3	±0
Valid votes	83,258	98.78	+0.55		
Invalid votes	1,028	1.22	–0.55		
Votes cast / turnout	84,286	75.69	–11.93		
Abstentions	27,074	24.31	+11.93		
Registered voters	111,360				
Sources
Footnotes: ^{1} Spanish Socialist Workers' Party results are compared to the combined totals of Spanish Socialist Workers' Party and People's Socialist Party–Socialist Unity in the 1977 election.; ^{2} Democratic Coalition results are compared to People's Alliance totals in the 1977 election.; ^{3} Party of Labour of Spain results are compared to Democratic Left Front totals in the 1977 election.

=== 1977 ===
Summary of the 15 June 1977 Congress of Deputies election results in Segovia
Parties and alliances	Popular vote			Seats	
Parties and alliances	Votes	%	±pp	Total	+/−
Union of the Democratic Centre (UCD)	50,270	58.76	n/a	2	n/a
Spanish Socialist Workers' Party (PSOE)	18,210	21.28	n/a	1	n/a
People's Alliance (AP)	7,407	8.66	n/a	0	n/a
People's Socialist Party–Socialist Unity (PSP–US)	5,330	6.23	n/a	0	n/a
Communist Party of Spain (PCE)	2,101	2.46	n/a	0	n/a
Spanish Phalanx of the CNSO (Authentic) (FE–JONS(A))	913	1.07	n/a	0	n/a
Socialist Movement (MS)	599	0.70	n/a	0	n/a
Democratic Left Front (FDI)	361	0.42	n/a	0	n/a
Blank ballots	364	0.43	n/a		
Total	85,555			3	n/a
Valid votes	85,555	98.23	n/a		
Invalid votes	1,542	1.77	n/a		
Votes cast / turnout	87,097	87.62	n/a		
Abstentions	12,311	12.38	n/a		
Registered voters	99,408				

== Bibliography ==
- Ley 1/1977, de 4 de enero, para la Reforma Política (Fundamental Law 1/1977). Official State Gazette (in Spanish). 4 January 1977. BOE-A-1977-165.
- Real Decreto-ley 20/1977, de 18 de marzo, sobre Normas Electorales (Royal Decree-Law 20/1977). Official State Gazette (in Spanish). 18 March 1977. BOE-A-1977-7445.
- Constitución Española (Constitution). Official State Gazette (in Spanish). 27 December 1978. BOE-A-1978-31229.
- Ley Orgánica 5/1985, de 19 de junio, del Régimen Electoral General (Organic Law 5/1985). Official State Gazette (in Spanish). 19 June 1985. BOE-A-1985-11672.
- Carreras de Odriozola, Albert; Tafunell Sambola, Xavier (2005) [1989]. Estadísticas históricas de España, siglos XIX-XX (PDF) (in Spanish). Vol. 1 (II ed.). Bilbao: Fundación BBVA. pp. 1072–1097. ISBN 84-96515-00-1. Archived from the original (PDF) on 24 September 2015.
