= 2019 Spanish elections =

2019 Spanish elections may refer to one of three nationwide elections held in Spain on 26 May 2019:

- 2019 Spanish local elections, to elect local seats in Spanish municipalities, provinces and island councils.
- 2019 Spanish regional elections, to elect the regional parliaments of thirteen autonomous communities.
- 2019 European Parliament election in Spain, to elect the Spanish delegation to the 9th European Parliament.

For the Spanish general elections held in the same year, see 2019 Spanish general elections.
