= 2016 Spanish regional elections =

- 25 September 2016

150 seats in the regional parliaments of the Basque Country and Galicia
Regional administrations by leading party in 2016
National parties
PSOE (7)
PP (5+2)
Regional parties
PDeCAT (1)
EAJ/PNV (1)
CC (1)
PRC (1)
GBai (1)

Regional elections were held in Spain during 2016 to elect the regional parliaments of two of the seventeen autonomous communities: the Basque Country and Galicia. 150 of 1,198 seats in the regional parliaments were up for election. The elections were held on 25 September in both regions.

== Election date ==
Determination of election day varied depending on the autonomous community. Typically, most autonomous communities held their elections on the fourth Sunday of May every four years, concurrently with nationwide local elections, while others had their own, separate electoral cycles. In some cases, regional presidents had the prerogative to dissolve parliament and call for extra elections at a different time, but newly elected assemblies were restricted to serving out what remained of their previous four year-terms without altering the period to their next ordinary election. In other cases—Andalusia (since 1994), Aragon (2007), the Balearic Islands (2007), the Basque Country (1981), Castile and León (2007), Catalonia (1985), Extremadura (2011), Galicia (1985), Navarre (2010) and the Valencian Community (2006)—the law granted regional presidents the power to call snap elections resulting in fresh four-year parliamentary terms.

== Regional governments ==
The following table lists party control in autonomous communities and cities. Gains for a party are highlighted in that party's colour.

Election day	Region	Previous control	New control
25 September	Basque Country	Basque Nationalist Party (EAJ/PNV)	Basque Nationalist Party (EAJ/PNV)
25 September	Galicia	People's Party (PP)	People's Party (PP)

== Summary by region ==
=== September (2 regions) ===
==== Basque Country ====
Parties and alliances	Votes	%	±pp	Seats	+/−
EAJ/PNV	398,168	37.36	+3.20	28	+1
EH Bildu	225,172	21.13	−3.54	18	−3
Elkarrekin Podemos	157,334	14.76	+11.04	11	+11
PSE–EE (PSOE)	126,420	11.86	−7.03	9	−7
PP	107,771	10.11	−1.48	9	−1
C's	21,477	2.02	New	0	±0
UPyD	n/a	n/a	−1.91	0	−1
Others	22,662	2.13		0	±0
Blank ballots	6,681	0.63	−0.67		
Valid votes	1,065,685	99.56	+0.37		
Invalid votes	4,672	0.44	−0.37		
Votes cast / turnout	1,070,357	60.02	−3.94		
Registered voters	1,783,419				

==== Galicia ====
Parties and alliances	Votes	%	±pp	Seats	+/−
PP	682,150	47.56	+1.76	41	±0
En Marea	273,523	19.07	+5.16	14	+5
PSdeG–PSOE	256,381	17.87	−2.74	14	−4
BNG–Nós	119,446	8.33	−1.78	6	−1
C's	48,553	3.38	New	0	±0
PACMA	15,135	1.06	+0.50	0	±0
Others	25,193	1.76		0	±0
Blank ballots	14,037	0.98	−1.68		
Valid votes	1,434,418	99.00	+1.53		
Invalid votes	14,544	1.00	−1.53		
Votes cast / turnout	1,448,962	53.63	−1.28		
Registered voters	2,701,932				

== Bibliography ==
- Ley Orgánica 5/1985, de 19 de junio, del Régimen Electoral General (Organic Law 5/1985). Official State Gazette (in Spanish). 19 June 1985 [version as of 31 March 2015]. BOE-A-1985-11672.
