= 2018 Spanish women's strike =

Women's rights protest in Spain

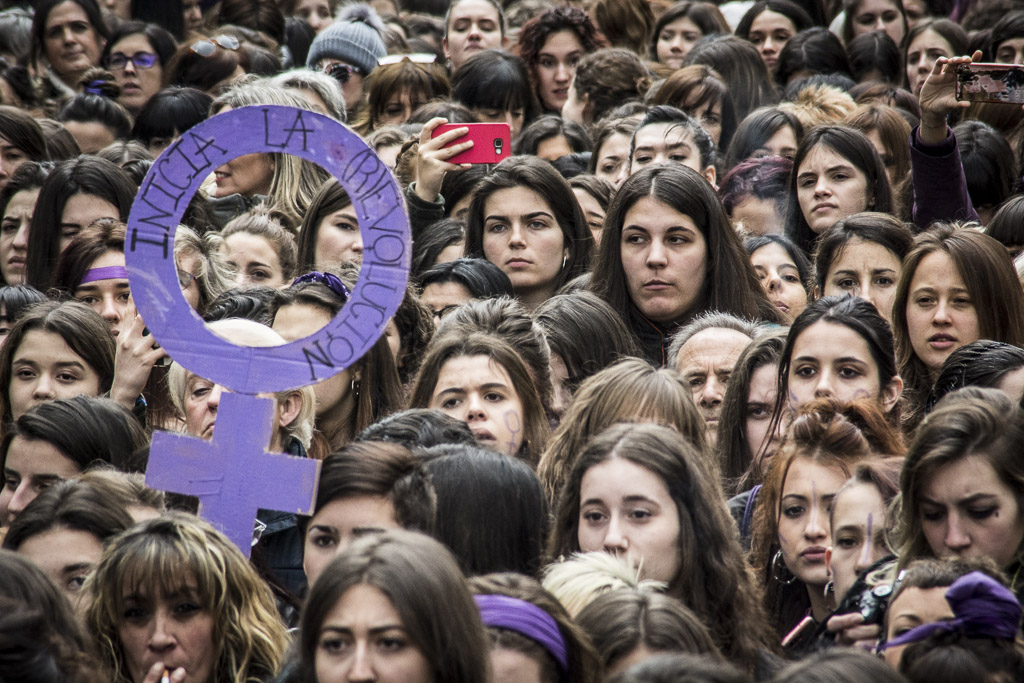
- Women's strike in Pamplona, on 8 March 2018.
- Date: 8 March 2018
- Location: Spain
- Methods: Women's strike

On 8 March 2018, International Women's Day, Spanish women went on strike for the day to denounce sexual discrimination, domestic violence and the wage gap.

== Description ==
Participants, led by women's organizations and the trade unions, did not go to their paid jobs, especially in education, and did not do any housework or child-rearing for the whole day; some groups additionally called for a consumption strike. The unions estimate that 5 million women participated in the strike, with massive demonstrations taking place in the most populated cities of the country.

The action was part of the annual International Women's Strike.
