= Centrados =

- President: Juan Ángel Ruiz
- Vice president: Esther Bermejo
- Secretary general: Ángel Tuñón
- Founded: 25 September 2018
- Split from: Union, Progress and Democracy
- Headquarters: Segovia
- Political position: Centrism

Centrados (literally "Centred" in plural) is a Spanish political party based in the province of Segovia in Castile and León. The localist party was founded in September 2018, splitting from the nationwide centrist party Union, Progress and Democracy (UPyD).

== History ==
Centrados was founded in September 2018 as a split from the nationwide party Union, Progress and Democracy (UPyD) which was then in decline. The founding president of the party was Juan Ángel Ruiz, a deputy in the Provincial Deputation, and its vice president was Esther Bermejo, a member of Segovia City Council.

In the 2019 local elections, thirteen Centrados members were elected to councils in the province. This made it the fourth-biggest party in town halls in the province, after the People's Party (615), the Spanish Socialist Workers' Party (385) and Citizens (38). In Cabañas de Polendos, Javier Gómez was elected mayor. However, it did not have any members elected to the Provincial Deputation or the City Hall of the provincial capital. In the 2023 elections, it dropped to two councillors.

The party has also contested unsuccessfully for seats in the Congress of Deputies, Senate, Cortes of Castile and León and the European Parliament. In the 2019 European Parliament election in Spain, it took part as part in Centrists for Europe, a localist coalition led by the Democratic Centre Coalition.
