= 2023 Spanish general election =

- 23 July 2023

All 350 seats in the Congress of Deputies and 208 (of 266) seats in the Senate 176 seats needed for a majority in the Congress of Deputies
- Opinion polls
- Registered: 37,469,458 ▲1.3%
- Turnout: 24,952,447 (66.6%) ▲0.4 pp
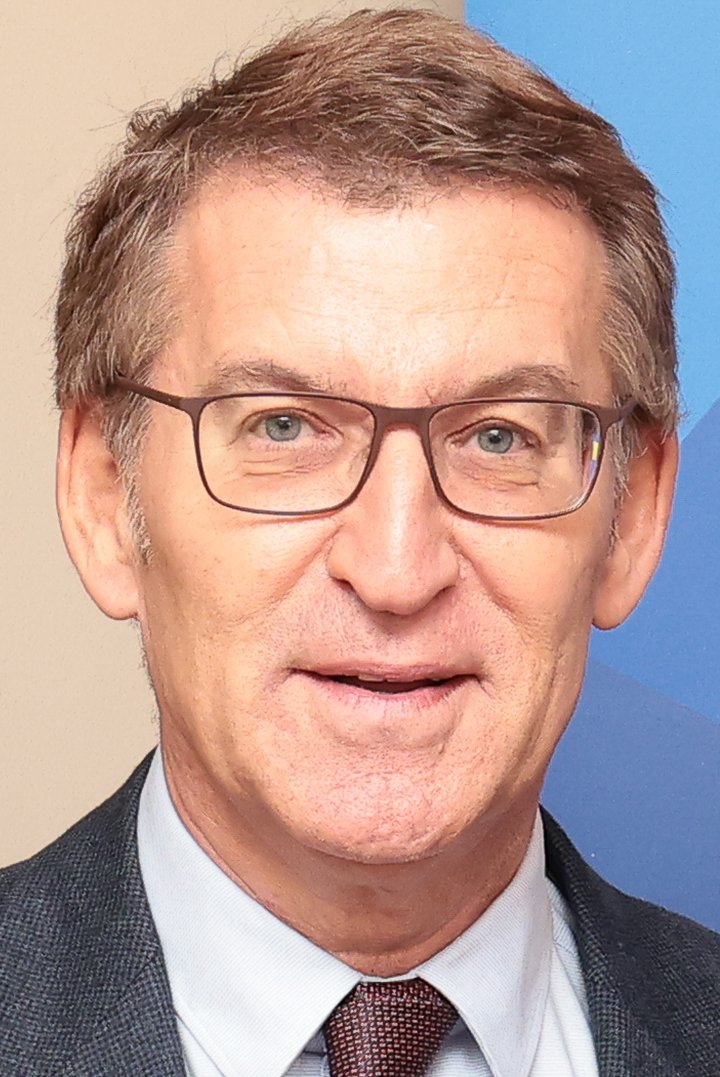

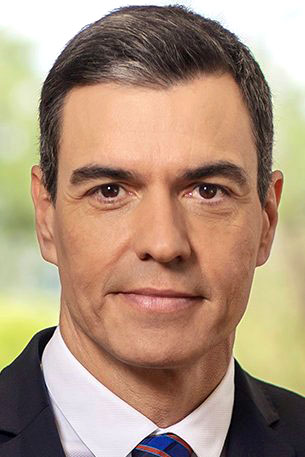

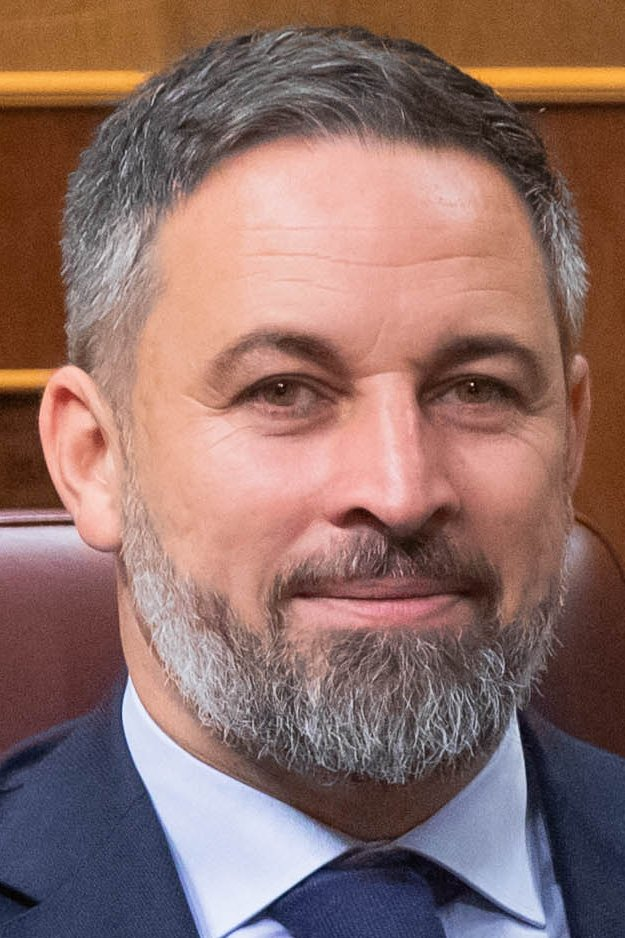

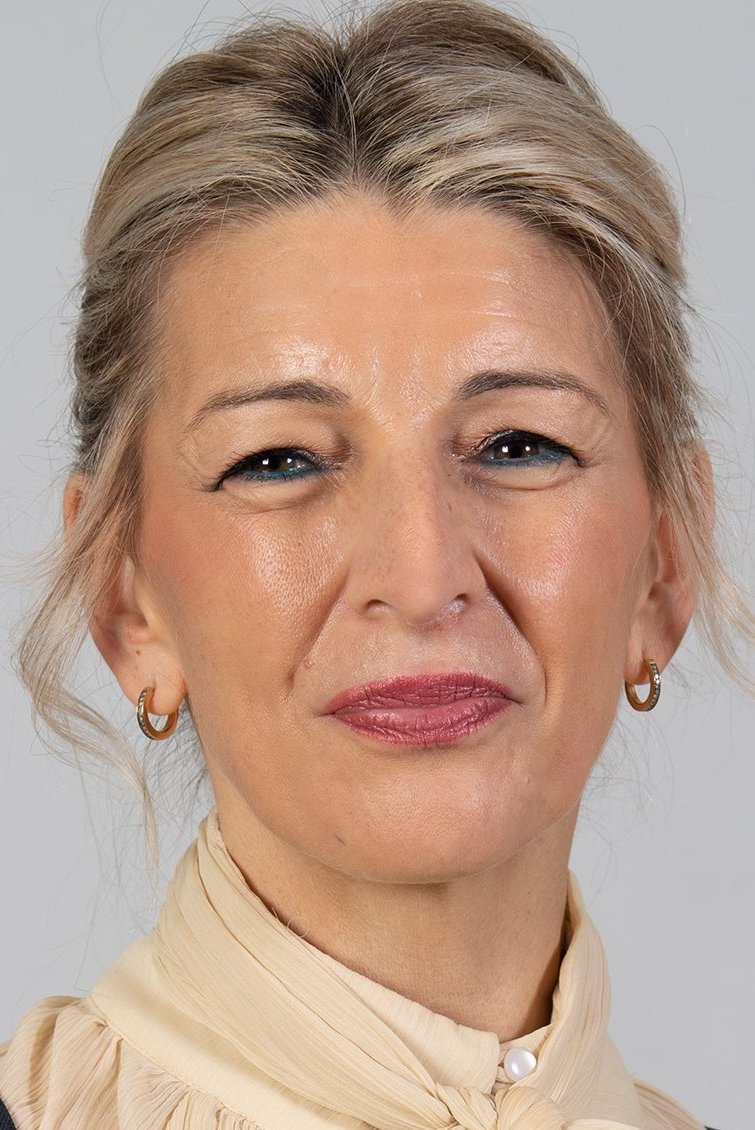

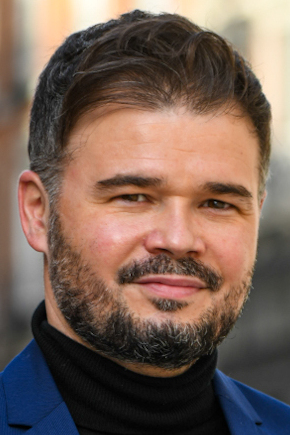

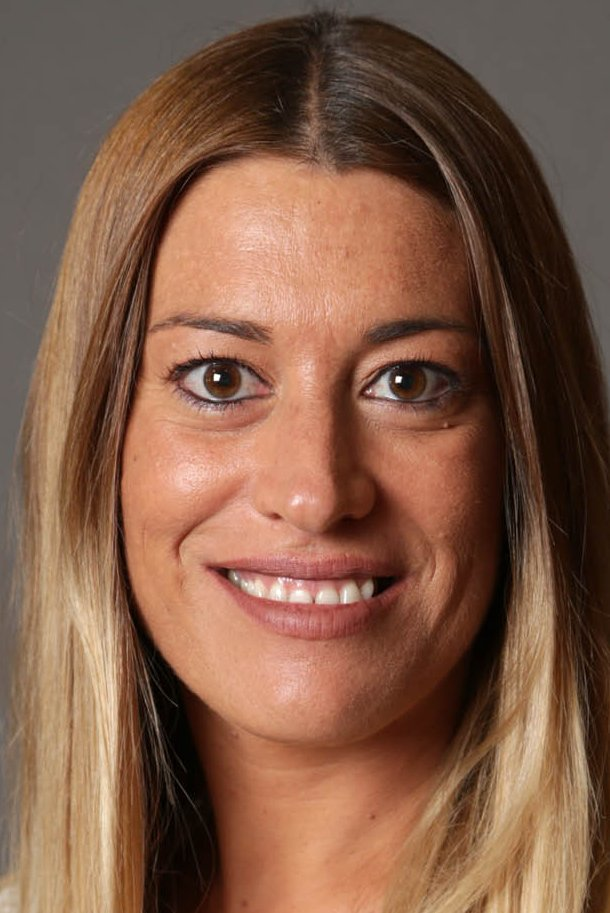
	First party	Second party	Third party
Leader	Alberto Núñez Feijóo	Pedro Sánchez	Santiago Abascal
Party	PP	PSOE	Vox
Leader since	2 April 2022	18 June 2017	20 September 2014
Leader's seat	Madrid	Madrid	Madrid
Last election	89 seats, 20.8%	120 seats, 28.0%	52 seats, 15.1%
Seats won	137	121	33
Seat change	▲48	▲1	▼19
Popular vote	8,160,837	7,821,718	3,057,000
Percentage	33.1%	31.7%	12.4%
Swing	▲12.3 pp	▲3.7 pp	▼2.7 pp
	Fourth party	Fifth party	Sixth party
Leader	Yolanda Díaz	Gabriel Rufián	Míriam Nogueras
Party	Sumar	ERC	Junts
Leader since	2 April 2023	14 October 2019	12 March 2021
Leader's seat	Madrid	Barcelona	Barcelona
Last election	38 seats, 15.3% (Note: Results for Unidas Podemos (12.9%, 35 deputies), Más País (2.4%, 3 deputies), Més Esquerra (0.1%, 0 deputies) and CHA (0.0%, 0 deputies) in the November 2019 Congress election.)	13 seats, 3.6%	8 seats, 2.2% (Note: Results for JxCat–Junts in the November 2019 election.)
Seats won	31	7	7
Seat change	▼7	▼6	▼1
Popular vote	3,044,996	466,020	395,429
Percentage	12.3%	1.9%	1.6%
Swing	▼3.0 pp	▼1.7 pp	▼0.6 pp
Prime Minister before election
Pedro Sánchez
PSOE
Prime Minister after election
Pedro Sánchez
PSOE

A general election was held in Spain on 23 July 2023 to elect the members of the 15th Cortes Generales under the Spanish Constitution of 1978. All 350 seats in the Congress of Deputies were up for election, as well as 208 of 266 seats in the Senate. It was the first time since 1839 that a general election in Spain was held in the month of July.

The second government of Pedro Sánchez formed after the November 2019 election consisted of a left-wing coalition between the Spanish Socialist Workers' Party (PSOE) and Unidas Podemos, the country's first such nationwide government since the Second Spanish Republic. Its tenure was quickly overshadowed by the outbreak of the COVID-19 pandemic in March 2020, along with its political and economic consequences (including a recession resulting from the extensive lockdowns implemented to curb the spread of the SARS-CoV-2 virus), as well as the impact of the Russian invasion of Ukraine (which aggravated an ongoing inflation surge) and the 2021 volcanic eruption in La Palma. The opposition People's Party (PP) saw party leader Pablo Casado being replaced by the Galician president, Alberto Núñez Feijóo, after an internal push in February 2022 by Madrilenian president Isabel Díaz Ayuso (a rising star within the party following her 2021 regional election victory). Far-right Vox had been supporting PP-led cabinets at the regional and local level in exchange for programmatic concessions and—eventually—government participation; whereas the liberal Citizens party, which had lost most of its support since 2019, chose not to run.

Despite speculation about a snap election, Prime Minister Pedro Sánchez consistently expressed his intention to complete his term as scheduled in 2023, after the Spanish presidency of the Council of the European Union. Poor results of the left-wing bloc in the 2023 local and regional elections, with losses to the PP and Vox in all but three regions, led to a surprise early dissolution of parliament in what was described as a gamble by Sánchez to wrong-foot the opposition and prevent a six-month lame duck period. In the closest election since 1996, the PP saw the biggest increase in support and secured 137 seats in the Congress, but fell short of opinion polling expectations. The PSOE placed second and overperformed polls by improving upon previous results, gaining over one million votes and scoring its best result since 2008 in terms of votes and vote share. Vox saw a decrease in support, while the Sumar platform under the second deputy prime minister, Yolanda Díaz—the successor of the Unidas Podemos alliance after the resignation of Pablo Iglesias in 2021—won 31 seats in the Congress.

As neither bloc achieved a majority, the balance of power was held by the Together for Catalonia (Junts) party of former Catalan president and fugitive Carles Puigdemont, despite electoral losses by Catalan independence parties. Following a failed Feijóo attempt to secure investiture in the ensuing government formation process, Sánchez struck a deal with Junts—in exchange for a controversial amnesty bill which sparked protests—and most of the parliamentary regionalist and peripheral nationalist parties, securing re-election on 16 November with an absolute majority: the first time since 2011 that a repeat election was not needed and that a candidate was elected in the first ballot of investiture.

== Background ==
The outcome of the November 2019 general election saw the Spanish Socialist Workers' Party (PSOE) and the Unidas Podemos setting aside their differences and reaching a preliminary government deal within days. After securing the consent of the Republican Left of Catalonia (ERC)—despite tensions following the Spanish Supreme Court's prison sentences to Catalan independence leaders and the Spanish government's handling of the October 2019 protests—Pedro Sánchez was re-elected prime minister in January 2020, forming Spain's first nationwide coalition cabinet since the Second Republic, with Podemos leader Pablo Iglesias as second deputy prime minister.

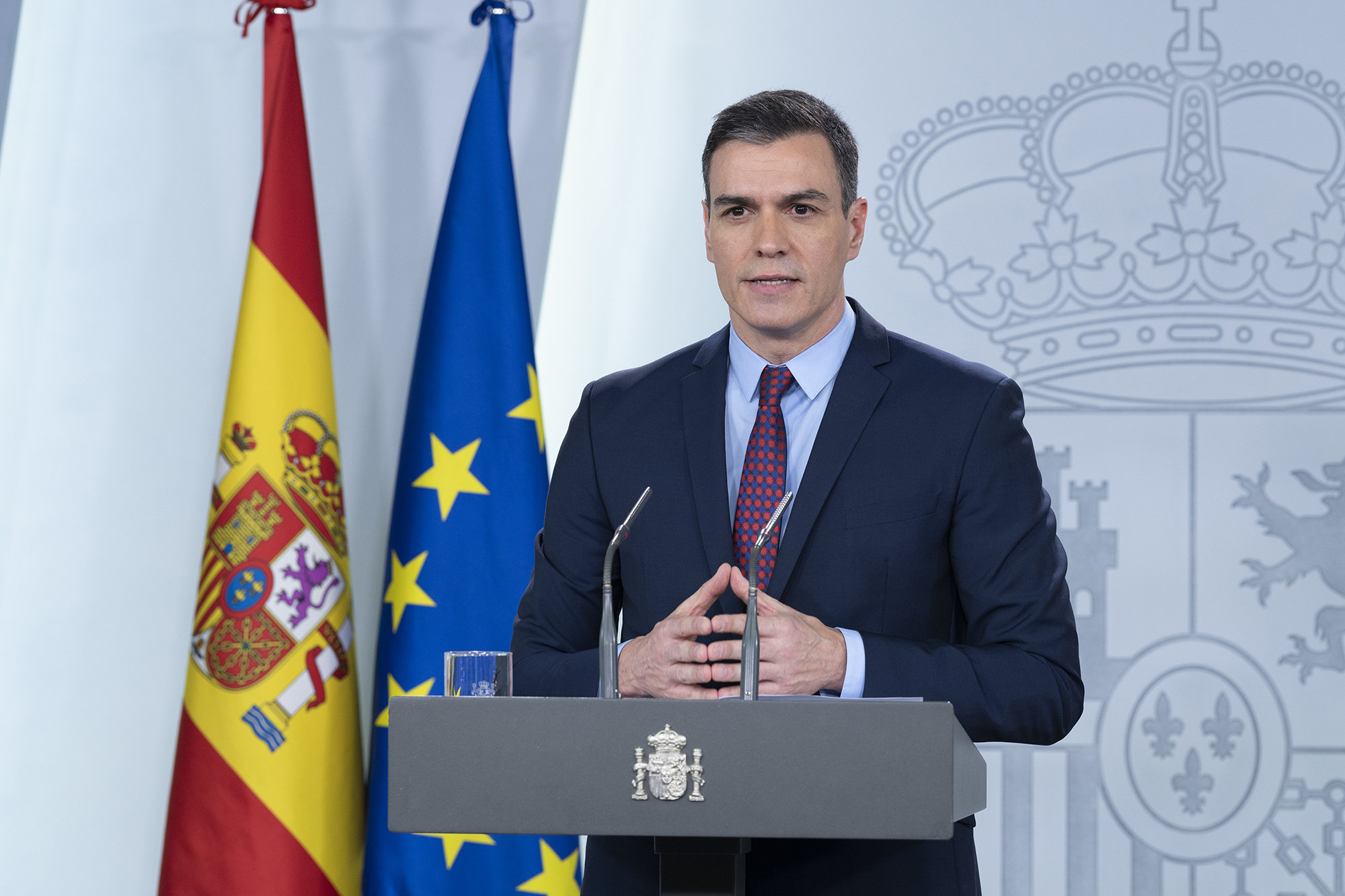
The COVID-19 pandemic saw Prime Minister Pedro Sánchez declaring a state of alarm together with nationwide lockdown on 12 March 2020, in order to "flatten the curve" and prevent the Spanish National Health System from being overwhelmed.

From March 2020, Sánchez's second government dealt with the outbreak of the COVID-19 pandemic, declaring a state of alarm and enforcing a nationwide lockdown to curb the spread of the virus ("flattening the curve"). The National Health System was quickly overwhelmed and the country saw high infection and death rates, especially in nursing homes. The sudden halt of non-essential economic activity triggered a recession, prompting the government to approve several relief packages collectively known as the "social shield". Anti-lockdown protests emerged in May 2020 in the Madrid region (the hardest hit by the pandemic), particularly in its wealthiest areas. Although restrictions were lifted by the summer, later waves of infections led to new limits and curfews, including a partial lockdown of Madrid in September 2020 and a six-month state of alarm that gave regions more control over restrictions. The authorities' initial response was widely criticized as slow and ineffective, and in 2021 a divided Constitutional Court ruled the two states of alarm unlawful, arguing that a state of exception—requiring prior, rather than later, parliamentary approval to enforce lockdowns—should have been used instead.

Spain became the second-largest recipient of the Next Generation EU recovery funds after successful negotiations, and the government presented a national plan focused mainly on energy and digital transitions. This period also saw reconstruction efforts in La Palma after the 2021 Cumbre Vieja volcanic eruption; Spain's participation in military aid to Ukraine following the 2022 Russian invasion; and an inflation surge that triggered a global energy crisis, which saw the European Commission granting Spain a temporary mechanism to cap gas prices (the "Iberian exception"). Other major events included the 2021 Morocco–Spain border incident and the subsequent 2022 Melilla incident (in which 37 migrants died in a crowd crush), a March 2022 decision by Sánchez's government to accept the Western Sahara autonomy proposal, the 2022 NATO summit in Madrid, and Spain's presidency of the Council of the European Union in 2023. A major cabinet reshuffle in July 2021 saw the departure of several senior PSOE figures such as Carmen Calvo and José Luis Ábalos from the government.

In an attempt to ease tensions from the 2017–2018 Catalan crisis, Sánchez granted partial pardons to jailed pro-independence leaders in June 2021. His government also passed a major labour market reform (limiting temporary employment and strengthening collective bargaining) in a narrow 175–174 vote, seeing a decisive voting mistake by a PP member. Social reforms saw the legalization of euthanasia, the "Trans Law" allowing gender self-identification, and a reform of the abortion law that expanded rights and introduced paid menstrual leave. A new Education Law (the LOMLOE) was approved to reduce school segregation and limit grade retention, while a Democratic Memory Law sought to increase justice for victims of Franco's dictatorship. Animal welfare legislation was expanded, though the exclusion of hunting dogs and bullfighting drew criticism. Among the most controversial bills were an overhaul of the sedition and embezzlement offences—seen by the right-wing opposition as a concession to Catalan parties—and the "Only Yes Means Yes" sexual consent law, which contained a loophole that led to reduced sentences for hundreds of offenders. Concurrently, the ongoing blockade of the judiciary council (which stalled judicial appointments for years) prompted attempts at judicial reform, which triggered an institutional crisis in December 2022 when the Constitutional Court temporarily blocked the passage of the proposed legislation.

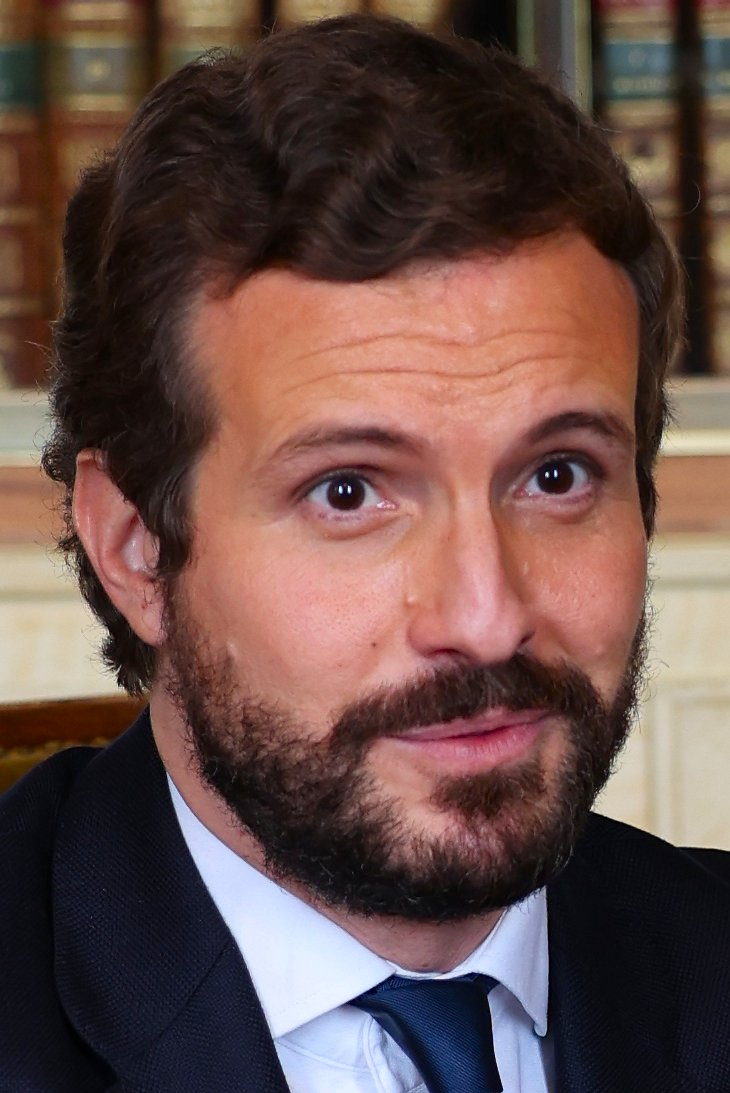
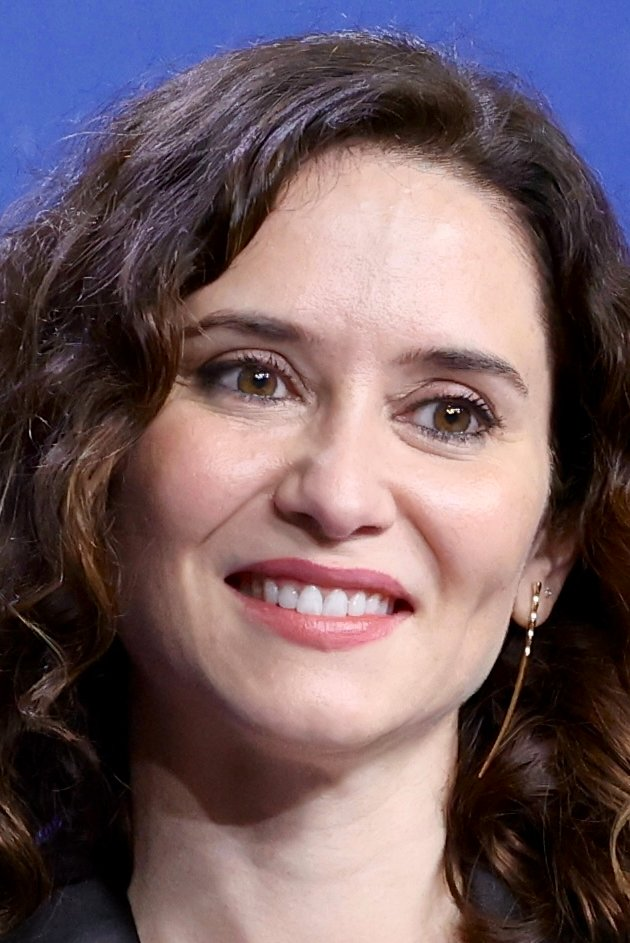
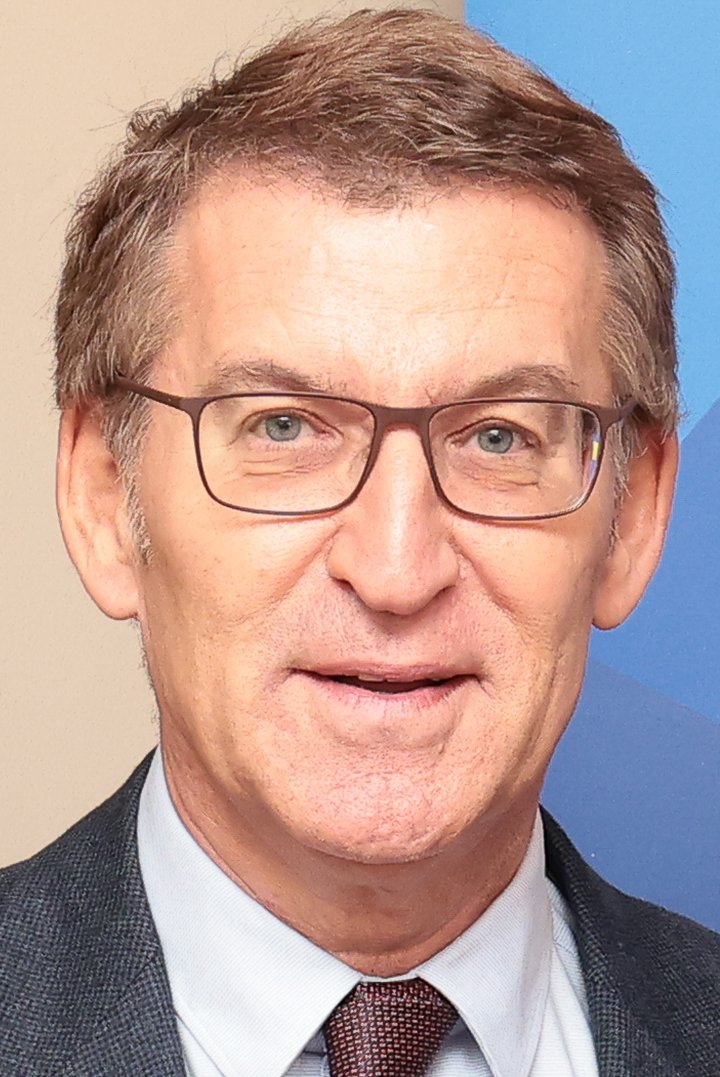
The rift between the leader of the People's Party (PP), Pablo Casado (left), and the Madrilenian president, Isabel Díaz Ayuso (center), culminated in a 2022 party crisis that saw the Galician president, Alberto Núñez Feijóo (right), elected as new PP leader.

Seeking to counter competition from the far-right Vox party under Santiago Abascal and to attract former Citizens (Cs) voters, the opposition People's Party (PP) adopted a confrontational stance toward Sánchez. The Madrid regional government of Isabel Díaz Ayuso—criticized for its triage protocols and selective lockdown measures during the pandemic—frequently clashed with the national government. Ayuso's polarizing profile made her one of Sánchez's main political rivals, culminating in a snap Madrid election in May 2021 in which she achieved a decisive victory and severely weakened Cs. This success also triggered a conflict with PP leader Pablo Casado over control of the regional party, which escalated after disappointing results in the 2022 Castilian-Leonese election and Ayuso's subsequent accusations that Casado was trying to undermine her through a smear campaign. The crisis eventually led to Casado's removal and the election of the Galician president, Alberto Núñez Feijóo, as new PP leader in a show of unity. This period also saw the exposure of new corruption scandals during Rajoy's premiership: the so-called Kitchen affair (an alleged police espionage and deep state network operated by the interior ministry), and a large blackmail and tape-recording network operated by former police officer José Manuel Villarejo.

Having influence over several regional PP–Cs governments formed after the 2019 regional elections, Vox pushed for some of its most controversial proposals, including a "parental pin" in Murcia (allowing parents to veto school activities they considered "contrary to moral principles"), and an anti-abortion plan in Castile and León that would have required doctors to pregnant women the chance to hear the fetal heartbeat or undergo a 4D ultrasound (ultimately dropped to prevent a constitutional conflict). Amid growing political polarization, and seeking to capitalize on anti-lockdown protests and public anger at the Spanish government, Vox tabled two no-confidence motions against Sánchez in 2020 and 2023. Both failed by wide margins, but they highlighted the PP's shift from outright opposition under Casado in the first to a conciliatory abstention under Feijóo in the second.

Pablo Iglesias resigned from the government to run against Ayuso in the 2021 Madrid election, but his poor result led him to leave politics. Labour minister Yolanda Díaz then emerged as his likely successor as his alliance's candidate for prime minister, using her popularity to reorganize Unidas Podemos by bringing together several left-wing parties—such as En Comú Podem, Compromís and Más Madrid/Más País—under the Sumar umbrella. The Tito Berni affair in March 2023 (a cash-for-favours scheme involving a PSOE lawmaker from the Canary Islands), controversy over the pro-Basque independence EH Bildu party including former ETA members on its candidate lists, and a vote-buying scandal (particularly affecting Melilla), complicated the political landscape and contributed to losses for left-wing parties in the May 2023 local and regional elections. This prompted Sánchez to call a surprise snap election for 23 July, a move widely seen as an attempt to catch the opposition off guard and avoid a prolonged lame-duck period.

== Overview ==
Under the 1978 Constitution, the Spanish Cortes Generales were conceived as an imperfect bicameral system. The Congress of Deputies held greater legislative power than the Senate, having the ability to grant or withdraw confidence from a prime minister and to override Senate vetoes by an absolute majority. Nonetheless, the Senate retained a limited number of specific functions—such as ratifying international treaties, authorizing cooperation agreements between autonomous communities, enforcing direct rule, regulating interterritorial compensation funds, and taking part in constitutional amendments and in the appointment of members to the Constitutional Court and the General Council of the Judiciary—which were not subject to override by Congress.

=== Date ===
The term of each chamber of the Cortes Generales—the Congress and the Senate—expired four years from the date of their previous election, unless they were dissolved earlier. The election decree was required to be issued no later than 25 days before the scheduled expiration date of parliament and published on the following day in the Official State Gazette (BOE), with election day taking place 54 days after the decree's publication. The previous election was held on 10 November 2019, which meant that the chambers' terms would have expired on 10 November 2023. The election decree was required to be published in the BOE no later than 17 October 2023, setting the latest possible date for election day on 10 December 2023.

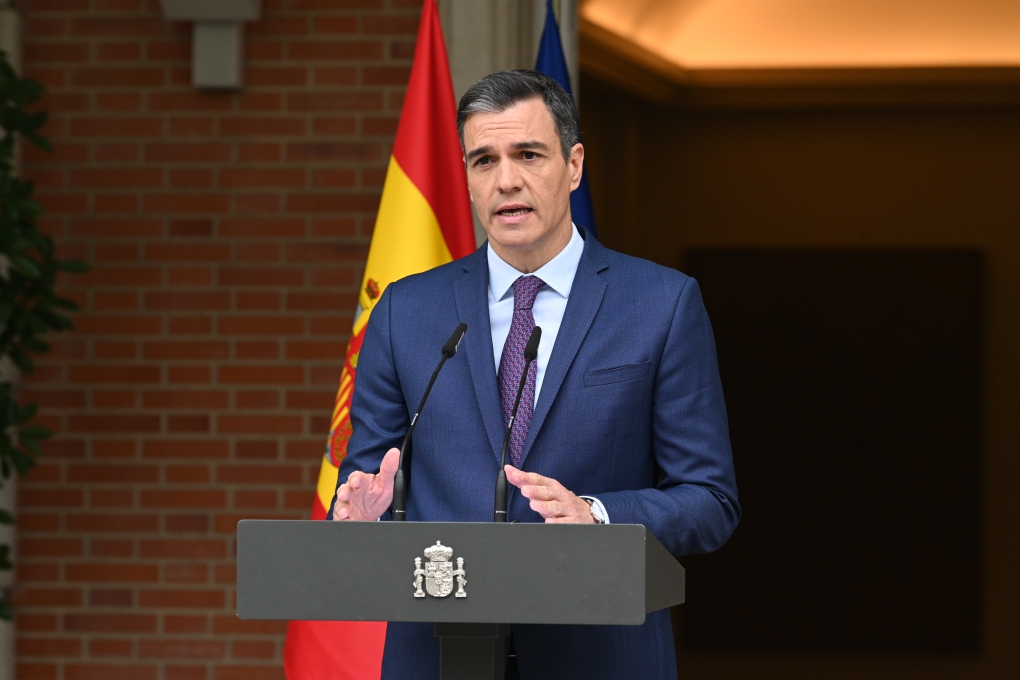
Prime Minister Pedro Sánchez announcing a snap election for 23 July 2023

The prime minister had the prerogative to propose the monarch to dissolve both chambers at any given time—either jointly or separately—and call a snap election, provided that no motion of no confidence was in process, no state of emergency was in force and that dissolution did not occur before one year after a previous one. Additionally, both chambers were to be dissolved and a new election called if an investiture process failed to elect a prime minister within a two-month period from the first ballot. Barring this exception, there was no constitutional requirement for simultaneous elections to the Congress and the Senate. Still, as of 2026, there has been no precedent of separate elections taking place under the 1978 Constitution.

Following his party's defeat in the 2021 Madrid election, Prime Minister Pedro Sánchez commented that there were still "32 months to go" for the next general election, implying he was working on a January 2024 date. This prompted comments on the maximum legal duration of the Cortes Generales, as a January or even February 2024 election date could only be considered if their four-year term was counted from the chambers' first assembly or from the prime minister's investiture, instead of from the previous general election. In August 2022, Sánchez himself dispelled any doubts by announcing that the election would be held in December 2023, a position that he reiterated the next March when he commented that there were still "nine months left" in the legislative term.

On 29 May 2023, following Sánchez announcement of a general election for 23 July—the first time such an election was called for a July month since 1839—political parties from across the spectrum were caught by surprise. PP leaders in particular were reportedly upset as the election call prevented them from capitalizing on their local and regional election gains. The Cortes Generales were officially dissolved on 30 May 2023 with the publication of the corresponding decree in the BOE, setting election day for 23 July and scheduling for both chambers to reconvene on 17 August.

=== Electoral system ===
Voting for each chamber of the Cortes Generales was based on universal suffrage, comprising all Spanish nationals over 18 years of age with full political rights, provided that they had not been deprived of the right to vote by a final sentence. Amendments in 2022 abolished the "begged" voting system (Spanish: voto rogado), under which non-resident citizens were required to apply for voting. The begged vote system was attributed responsibility for a major decrease in the turnout of Spaniards abroad during the years it was in force.

The Congress of Deputies had a minimum of 300 and a maximum of 400 seats, with electoral provisions fixing its size at 350. Of these, 348 were elected in 50 multi-member constituencies corresponding to the provinces of Spain—each of which was assigned an initial minimum of two seats and the remaining 248 distributed in proportion to population—using the D'Hondt method and closed-list proportional voting, with a three percent-threshold of valid votes (including blank ballots) in each constituency. The remaining two seats were allocated to Ceuta and Melilla as single-member districts elected by plurality voting. The use of this electoral method resulted in a higher effective threshold depending on district magnitude and vote distribution.

As a result of the aforementioned allocation, each Congress multi-member constituency was entitled the following seats:

Seats	Constituencies
37	Madrid
32	Barcelona
16	Valencia^{(+1)}
12	Alicante, Seville
11	Málaga
10	Murcia
9	Cádiz
8	A Coruña, Balearic Islands, Biscay, Las Palmas
7	Asturias, Granada, Pontevedra, Zaragoza, Santa Cruz de Tenerife
6	Almería, Córdoba, Gipuzkoa, Girona, Tarragona, Toledo
5	Badajoz^{(−1)}, Cantabria, Castellón, Ciudad Real, Huelva, Jaén, Navarre, Valladolid
4	Álava, Albacete, Burgos, Cáceres, La Rioja, León, Lleida, Lugo, Ourense, Salamanca
3	Ávila, Cuenca, Guadalajara, Huesca, Palencia, Segovia, Teruel, Zamora
2	Soria

208 Senate seats were elected using open-list (Note: Parties could group candidates into lists, although each candidate was treated separately for the purpose of the voting procedure.) partial block voting: voters in constituencies electing four seats could choose up to three candidates; in those with two or three seats, up to two; and in single-member districts, one. Each of the 47 peninsular provinces was allocated four seats, while in insular provinces—such as the Balearic and Canary Islands—the districts were the islands themselves, with the larger ones (Mallorca, Gran Canaria and Tenerife) being allocated three seats each, and the smaller ones (Menorca, Ibiza–Formentera, Fuerteventura, La Gomera, El Hierro, Lanzarote and La Palma) one each. Ceuta and Melilla elected two seats each. Additionally, autonomous communities could appoint at least one senator each and were entitled to one additional seat per million inhabitants.

The law did not provide for by-elections to fill vacant seats; instead, any vacancies arising after the proclamation of candidates and during the legislative term were filled by the next candidates on the party lists or, when required, by designated substitutes.

=== Outgoing parliament ===
The tables below show the composition of the parliamentary groups in both chambers at the time of dissolution.

Parliamentary composition in May 2023
Congress of Deputies
Groups	Parties	Deputies	
Groups	Parties	Seats	Total
Socialist Parliamentary Group	PSOE	108	120
Socialist Parliamentary Group	PSC	12	120
People's Parliamentary Group in the Congress	PP	88	88
Vox Parliamentary Group	Vox	52	52
United We Can–In Common We Can– Galicia in Common's Confederal; Parliamentary Group	Podemos	23	33
United We Can–In Common We Can– Galicia in Common's Confederal; Parliamentary Group	IU	5	33
United We Can–In Common We Can– Galicia in Common's Confederal; Parliamentary Group	CatComú	4	33
United We Can–In Common We Can– Galicia in Common's Confederal; Parliamentary Group	AV	1	33
Republican Parliamentary Group	ERC	12	13
Republican Parliamentary Group	Sobiranistes	1	13
Plural Parliamentary Group	JxCat	4	12
Plural Parliamentary Group	PDeCAT	4	12
Plural Parliamentary Group	Más País	2	12
Plural Parliamentary Group	Compromís	1	12
Plural Parliamentary Group	BNG	1	12
Citizens Parliamentary Group	CS	9	9
Basque Parliamentary Group (EAJ/PNV)	EAJ/PNV	6	6
EH Bildu Parliamentary Group	EH Bildu	5	5
Mixed Parliamentary Group	CUP	2	11
Mixed Parliamentary Group	CCa	2	11
Mixed Parliamentary Group	PN	2	11
Mixed Parliamentary Group	Foro	1	11
Mixed Parliamentary Group	PRC	1	11
Mixed Parliamentary Group	TE	1	11
Mixed Parliamentary Group	INDEP	2 (Note: Meri Pita, former Podemos legislator; Pablo Cambronero, former CS legislator.)	11

Parliamentary composition in May 2023
Senate
Groups	Parties	Senators	
Groups	Parties	Seats	Total
Socialist Parliamentary Group	PSOE	108	113
Socialist Parliamentary Group	PSC	5	113
People's Parliamentary Group in the Senate	PP	104	104
Republican Left–EH Bildu; Parliamentary Group	ERC	14	16
Republican Left–EH Bildu; Parliamentary Group	EH Bildu	2	16
Basque Parliamentary Group in the Senate (EAJ/PNV)	EAJ/PNV	10	10
Nationalist Parliamentary Group in the Senate (JxCat–CCa/PNC)	JxCat	5	6
Nationalist Parliamentary Group in the Senate (JxCat–CCa/PNC)	CCa	1	6
Confederal Left Parliamentary Group (More for Majorca, More Madrid, Commitment, Yes to the Future and Gomera Socialist Group)	Más Madrid	1	5
Confederal Left Parliamentary Group (More for Majorca, More Madrid, Commitment, Yes to the Future and Gomera Socialist Group)	Compromís	1	5
Confederal Left Parliamentary Group (More for Majorca, More Madrid, Commitment, Yes to the Future and Gomera Socialist Group)	Més	1	5
Confederal Left Parliamentary Group (More for Majorca, More Madrid, Commitment, Yes to the Future and Gomera Socialist Group)	GBai	1	5
Confederal Left Parliamentary Group (More for Majorca, More Madrid, Commitment, Yes to the Future and Gomera Socialist Group)	ASG	1	5
Democratic Parliamentary Group (Citizens, Teruel Exists and Regionalist; Party of Cantabria)	TE	2	4
Democratic Parliamentary Group (Citizens, Teruel Exists and Regionalist; Party of Cantabria)	CS	1	4
Democratic Parliamentary Group (Citizens, Teruel Exists and Regionalist; Party of Cantabria)	PRC	1	4
Mixed Parliamentary Group	Vox	3	7
Mixed Parliamentary Group	UPN	1	7
Mixed Parliamentary Group	PAR	1	7
Mixed Parliamentary Group	INDEP	2 (Note: Ruth Goñi and Emilio Argüeso, former CS legislators.)	7

== Candidates ==
=== Nomination rules ===
Spanish citizens with the right to vote could run for election, provided that they had not been criminally imprisoned by a final sentence or convicted—whether final or not—of offences that involved loss of eligibility or disqualification from public office (such as rebellion, terrorism or other crimes against the state). Additional causes of ineligibility applied to the following officials:

- Members of the Spanish royal family and their spouses;
- Holders of a number of senior public or institutional posts, including the heads and members of higher courts and state institutions; (Note: These comprised the Constitutional Court, the General Council of the Judiciary, the Supreme Court, the Council of State, the Court of Auditors and the Economic and Social Council.) the Ombudsman; the State's Attorney General; high-ranking officials of government departments, the Office of the Prime Minister and other state agencies; government delegates in the autonomous communities; the chair of RTVE; the director of the Electoral Register Office; the governor and deputy governor of the Bank of Spain; the heads of official credit institutions; and members of electoral commissions and of the Nuclear Safety Council;
- Heads of diplomatic missions abroad;
- Judges and public prosecutors in active service;
- Members of the Armed Forces and law enforcement bodies in active service.

Other ineligibility provisions also applied to a number of territorial officials in these categories within their areas of jurisdiction, as well as to employees of foreign states and members of regional governments.

Incompatibility rules included those of ineligibility, and also barred running in multiple constituencies or lists, holding office if the candidacy was later declared illegal (by a final ruling), and combining legislative roles (deputy, senator, and regional lawmaker) with each other or with:

- A number of senior public or institutional posts, including the presidency of the National Commission on Markets and Competition; and leadership positions in RTVE, government offices, public authorities (such as port authorities, hydrographic confederations, or highway concessionary companies), public entities and state-owned or publicly funded companies;
- Any other paid public or private position, except university teaching.

=== Parties and lists ===
The electoral law allowed for parties and federations registered in the interior ministry, alliances and groupings of electors to present lists of candidates. Parties and federations intending to form an alliance were required to inform the relevant electoral commission within 10 days of the election call, whereas groupings of electors needed to secure the signature of at least one percent of the electorate in the constituencies for which they sought election, disallowing electors from signing for more than one list. Concurrently, parties, federations or alliances that had not obtained a mandate in either chamber of the Cortes at the preceding election were required to secure the signature of at least 0.1 percent of electors in the aforementioned constituencies. Additionally, a balanced composition of men and women was required in the electoral lists, so that candidates of either sex made up at least 40 percent of the total composition.

A special, simplified process was provided for election re-runs, including a shortening of deadlines, electoral campaigning, the lifting of signature requirements if these had been already met for the immediately previous election and the possibility of maintaining lists and alliances without needing to go through pre-election procedures again.

Below is a list of the main parties and alliances which contested the election:

Candidacy	Parties and alliances	Leading candidate	Ideology	Previous result				Gov.	Ref.
Candidacy	Parties and alliances	Leading candidate	Ideology	Congress		Senate		Gov.	Ref.
Candidacy	Parties and alliances	Leading candidate	Ideology	Vote %	Seats	Vote %	Seats	Gov.	Ref.
PSOE	List: Spanish Socialist Workers' Party (PSOE); Socialists' Party of Catalonia (PSC)	Pedro Sánchez	Social democracy	28.0%	120	30.6% (Note: Results in the November 2019 Senate election, not including Ibiza–Formentera.)	92	Yes	
PP	List: People's Party (PP); Navarre Platform (PN)	Alberto Núñez Feijóo	Conservatism; Christian democracy	20.8%	89	26.8%	83	No	
Vox	List: Vox (Vox)	Santiago Abascal	Right-wing populism Ultranationalism; National conservatism	15.1%	52	5.1%	2	No	
Sumar	List: Unite Movement (SMR); We Can (Podemos); United Left (IU) – Communist Party of Spain (PCE) – The Dawn Marxist Organization (La Aurora (OM)) – Republican Left (IR) – Unitarian Candidacy of Workers (CUT); More Country (MP); More Madrid (MM); Greens Equo (VQ); Green Alliance (AV); In Common We Can (ECP) – Catalonia in Common (CatComú) – Barcelona in Common (BComú) – Green Left (EV); Commitment Coalition (Compromís) – Més–Compromís (Més) – Valencian People's Initiative (IdPV) – Greens Equo of the Valencian Country (VerdsEquo); More for Mallorca (Més); More for Menorca (MxMe); Aragonese Union (CHA); Drago Canaries Party (DRG); Asturian Left (IAS); Assembly (Batzarre); Andalusian People's Initiative (IdPA)	Yolanda Díaz	Progressivism; Left-wing populism Green politics	15.3%	38	14.0% (Note: Results for Unidas Podemos (12.4%, 0 senators), Más País (1.5%, 0 senators), Més Esquerra (0.1%, 0 senators) and CHA (0.0%, 0 senators) in the November 2019 Senate election, not including Ibiza–Formentera.)	0	Yes	
ERC	List: Republican Left of Catalonia (ERC)	Gabriel Rufián	Catalan independence Left-wing nationalism Social democracy	3.6%	13	Contested in alliance (Note: ERC and EH Bildu contested the 2023 Senate election within the IPLI alliance.)		No	
Junts	List: Together for Catalonia (JxCat); Democrats of Catalonia (DC); Left Movement (MES)	Míriam Nogueras	Catalan independence Sovereigntism; Populism	2.2%	8	2.7%	3	No	
PDeCAT– E–CiU	List: Catalan European Democratic Party (PDeCAT); CiU Space (E–CiU)	Roger Montañola	Catalan nationalism Liberalism	2.2%	8	2.7%	3	No	
EAJ/PNV	List: Basque Nationalist Party (EAJ/PNV)	Aitor Esteban	Basque nationalism Christian democracy	1.6%	6	1.8%	9	No	
EH Bildu	List: Basque Country Gather (EH Bildu) – Create (Sortu) – Basque Solidarity (EA) – Alternative (Alternatiba)	Mertxe Aizpurua	Basque independence Abertzale left Socialism	1.1%	5	Contested in alliance		No	
CUP–PR	List: Popular Unity Candidacy (CUP) – Forward–Socialist Organization of National Liberation (Endavant–OSAN) – Free People (PL–PPCC) – Internationalist Struggle (LI–CI); Let's Reverse (Capgirem)	Albert Botran	Catalan independence Anti-capitalism; Socialism	1.0%	2	Did not contest		No	
CCa	List: Canarian Coalition (CCa) (Note: Several parties signed a manifesto supporting CCa with a common roadmap but without participating in electoral lists: Independent Herrenian Group (AHI); United for Gran Canaria (UxGC); United for Mogán (JPM); The Fortress of Santa Lucía (La Fortaleza); Assembly of Neighbors of San Mateo (AVESAN); Socialist Group for Lanzarote (ASL); Tejeda for the Change (Tejeda por el Cambio); Local Platform for Santa Brígida (PVSB); Guía Now (AG); Democratic Centre Coalition (CCD))	Cristina Valido	Regionalism; Canarian nationalism Centrism	0.5% (Note: Results for CCa–PNC–NC in the November 2019 election.)	2	0.3%	0	No	
NC–BC	List: New Canaries–Canarian Bloc (NC–BC)	Luis Campos	Canarian nationalism Social democracy	0.5%	2	0.3%	0	No	
BNG	List: Galician Nationalist Bloc (BNG) – Galician People's Union (UPG) – Galician Movement for Socialism (MGS) – Abrente–Galician Democratic Left (Abrente–EDG) – Galician Workers' Front (FOGA)	Néstor Rego	Galician nationalism Left-wing nationalism Socialism	0.5%	1	0.6%	0	No	
EV	List: Empty Spain (EV) – Teruel Exists (TE) – Aragon Exists (AE) – Soria Now! (SY); Castilian Party–Commoners' Land (PCAS–TC)	Diego Loras	Localism; Ruralism	0.1% (Note: Results for ¡Teruel Existe! in the November 2019 election.)	1	0.1%	2	No	
ERC– EH Bildu	List: Republican Left of Catalonia (ERC); Basque Country Gather (EH Bildu)	Joan Queralt	Left-wing nationalism	Did not contest		6.1% (Note: Results for ERC (4.8%, 11 senators) and EH Bildu (1.3%, 1 senator) in the November 2019 Senate election, not including Ibiza–Formentera.)	12	No	
PSOE– SMR–EU– Ara Eivissa	List: Spanish Socialist Workers' Party (PSOE) (Note: In Ibiza–Formentera.); Unite Movement (SMR); United Left (EU); Now Ibiza (Ara Eivissa)	Juanjo Ferrer	Progressivism	Did not contest		0.0% (Note: Results for PSOE (0.0%, 1 senator), Unidas Podemos (0.0%, 0 senators) and esquerra (0.0%, 0 senators) in the November 2019 Senate election in Ibiza–Formentera.)	1	No	
ASG	List: Gomera Socialist Group (ASG)	Fabián Chinea	Insularism; Social democracy	Did not contest		0.0%	1	No	
AHI	List: Independent Herrenian Group (AHI)	Javier Armas	Insularism; Canarian nationalism Centrism	Did not contest		0.0%	0	No	
UPN	List: Navarrese People's Union (UPN)	Alberto Catalán	Regionalism; Conservatism; Christian democracy	Contested in alliance (Note: UPN (2 deputies and 1 senator) contested the November 2019 election within the NA+ alliance.)				No	
Not contesting
CS	List: Citizens–Party of the Citizenry (CS)	Patricia Guasp	Liberalism	6.8%	10	7.8%	0	No	
PRC	List: Regionalist Party of Cantabria (PRC)	José María Mazón	Regionalism; Centrism	0.3%	1	0.3%	0	No	

In September 2021, citizen collectives of the Empty Spain (Spanish: España Vacía or España Vaciada), a coined term to refer to Spain's rural and largely unpopulated interior provinces, agreed to look forward to formulas to contest the next elections in Spain, inspired by the success of the Teruel Existe candidacy (Spanish for "Teruel Exists") in the November 2019 general election. By November 2021, it was confirmed that over 160 collectives and associations from about 30 Spanish provinces had committed themselves to finalize the electoral platform before January 2022. It then contested the 2022 Castilian-Leonese election, with mixed results: the Soria Now! platform succeeded in the province of Soria, but it was a disappointment elsewhere.

On 30 May 2023, Citizens's leadership announced that the party would not contest the general election, following its poor results in the regional and local elections. This decision was criticized by a number of its elected representatives, including incumbent MP and former leadership contender Edmundo Bal. The Regionalist Party of Cantabria also decided not to run following the party's negative results in that year's Cantabrian election.

== Campaign ==
=== Timetable ===
The key dates are listed below. All times are CET, while the Canary Islands use WET (UTC+0) instead.

- 29 May: The election decree is issued with the countersign of the prime minister, after deliberation in the Council of Ministers, ratified by the King.
- 30 May: Formal dissolution of parliament and start of prohibition period on the inauguration of public works, services or projects.
- 2 June: Initial constitution of provincial and zone electoral commissions with judicial members.
- 5 June: Division of constituencies into polling sections and stations.
- 9 June: Deadline for parties and federations to report on their electoral alliances.
- 12 June: Deadline for electoral register consultation for the purpose of possible corrections.
- 19 June: Deadline for parties, federations, alliances, and groupings of electors to present electoral lists.
- 21 June: Publication of submitted electoral lists in the Official State Gazette (BOE).
- 26 June: Official proclamation of validly submitted electoral lists.
- 27 June: Publication of proclaimed electoral lists in the BOE.
- 28 June: Deadline for the selection of polling station members by sortition.
- 6 July: Deadline for the appointment of non-judicial members to provincial and zone electoral commissions.
- 7 July: Official start of electoral campaigning.
- 13 July: Deadline to apply for postal voting.
- 18 July: Start of legal ban on electoral opinion polling publication; deadline for non-resident citizens (electors residing abroad (CERA) and citizens temporarily absent from Spain) to vote by mail.
- 19 July: Deadline for postal and temporarily absent voting.
- 20 July: Deadline for CERA voting.
- 21 July: Last day of electoral campaigning.
- 22 July: Official election silence ("reflection day").
- 23 July: Election day (polling stations open at 9 am and close at 8 pm or once voters present in a queue at/outside the polling station at 8 pm have cast their vote); provisional vote counting.
- 28 July: Start of general vote counting, including CERA votes.
- 31 July: Deadline for the general vote counting.
- 9 August: Deadline for the proclamation of elected members.
- 17 August: Deadline for the reconvening of parliament (date determined by the election decree, which for the 2023 election was set for 17 August).
- 18 September: Deadline for the publication of definitive election results in the BOE.

=== Party slogans ===
Party or alliance	Original slogan	English translation	Ref.
PSOE	« Adelante. España avanza »	"Forward. Spain advances"	
PP	« Es el momento »	"It is time"	
Vox	« Lo que importa »	"What matters"	
Sumar: Sumar–ECP	Main: « Es por ti » Sumar–ECP: « A favor teu »	Main: "It is for you" Sumar–ECP: "In your favor"	
ERC	« Defensa Catalunya! »	"Defend Catalonia!"	
Junts	« Ja n'hi ha prou »	"Enough is enough"	
PDeCAT–E–CiU	« Ara toca »	"Now it's time"	
EAJ/PNV	« Euskadiren ahotsa. Con voz propia »	"Basque Country's voice. With its own voice"	
EH Bildu	« Berriro. Egingo dugu »	"We will do it. Again"	
CUP–PR	« Plantem cara »	"Let's stand strong"	
CCa	« Coalición por Canarias »	"Coalition for the Canaries"	
NC–BC	« Elegimos Canarias. Siempre »	"We choose the Canaries. Always"	
BNG	« Que Galiza conte! Con máis forza! »	"Make Galicia count! With more strength!"	
UPN	« No cambies la fiesta por nada »	"Don't trade the party for anything"	

=== Events and issues ===
An Ipsos poll published in July 2023 showed that most of the respondents saw economic issues as most important, followed by unemployment and healthcare. BBC News reported that LGBTQ rights were also distinguished during the campaign period.

Vox campaigned on lowering the income tax, reducing public spending, and introducing tougher anti-migration laws. Vox was also in favour of reducing powers of Spain's autonomous communities, rolling back abortion, LGBTQ, and women's rights, and pulling Spain out of the Paris Agreement. Sonia Gallego of Al Jazeera said that Vox's rhetoric "will put it on a collision course with those separatist movements, not just in the Basque Country but Catalonia as well". Vox received support from Brothers of Italy, led by Giorgia Meloni, during the campaign period.

PP campaigned on lowering taxes and introducing policies that would boost foreign investments, with Feijóo trying to portray himself as a moderate. Feijóo was also faced with criticism from Sumar due to his past ties with drug trafficker Marcial Dorado when he served in the Galician government in the 1990s. Feijóo responded by saying that Dorado "had been a smuggler [but] never a drug trafficker" when he knew him. PP and Vox also campaigned on ending Sanchismo, a derogatory term to refer to the policies introduced by Sánchez and his coalition government, with Feijóo stating that it was his main priority. Both parties also accused Sanchez of overly relying on separatist parties to pass key legislation and pardoning jailed leaders. The catchphrase "Let Txapote vote for you" (Spanish: ¡Que te vote Txapote!) was popularized within this context.

PSOE's Sánchez portrayed the election as a "showdown between the forces of progress and the forces of reactionary conservatism". He also criticized the relationship between PP and Vox. PP criticized PSOE's relationship with minority and pro-independence parties, as well as the government's anti-sexual assault law (popularly known as the "Only yes means yes law"), introduced in August 2022 and attributed responsibility for unwittingly leading to the release of at least 104 convicted sexual offenders owing to retroactivity of favourable provisions; Pedro Sánchez apologized for the loopholes in the law.

Sumar campaigned on criticizing Vox and focusing on issues regarding climate change and introducing a shorter workweek. In order to challenge social inequality, Díaz proposed a €20,000 "universal inheritance" policy for those over 18 years old which could be spent on studies or creating a business. As part of its campaign policy, Sumar also campaigned on increasing taxes on the rich.

=== Debates ===
2023 Spanish general election debates
Date	Organizer(s)	Moderator(s)	P Present (Note: Denotes a main invitee attending the event.) S Surrogate (Note: Denotes a main invitee not attending the event, sending a surrogate in their place.) NI Not invited I Invited A Absent invitee								
Date	Organizer(s)	Moderator(s)	PSOE	PP	Vox	Sumar	ERC	PNV	EH Bildu	Audience	Ref.
10 July	Atresmedia	Ana Pastor; Vicente Vallés	P Sánchez	P Feijóo	NI	NI	NI	NI	NI	46.5% (5,910,000)	
13 July	RTVE (Note: Parliamentary spokespersons' debate.)	Xabier Fortes	P López	P Gamarra	P Espinosa	S Vidal	P Rufián	P Esteban	P Matute	18.6% (1,893,000)	
19 July	RTVE	Xabier Fortes	P Sánchez	A	P Abascal	P Díaz	NI	NI	NI	34.6% (4,155,000)	

Opinion polls

Candidate viewed as "performing best" or "most convincing" in each debate
Debate	Polling firm/Commissioner	Sample	PSOE	PP	Tie	None	Question
10 July	EM-Analytics/Electomanía	1,987	35.8	52.5	–	–	11.7
10 July	Sigma Dos/El Mundo	?	45.8	54.2	–	–	–
10 July	40dB/Prisa (1st wave)	2,000	31.4	31.1	–	18.0	19.4
10 July	SocioMétrica/El Español	2,652	30.4	58.0	11.6	–	–
10 July	Simple Lógica/elDiario.es	1,300	31.2	50.1	–	18.8	–
10 July	40dB/Prisa (2nd wave)	2,000	21.5	44.2	–	26.3	8.0
10 July	InvyMark/laSexta	?	43.8	54.4	–	–	1.8

== Opinion polls ==
Local regression trend line of poll results from 10 November 2019 to 23 July 2023, with each line corresponding to a political party.

Polling aggregations

Polling aggregator	Last update	PSOE	PP	Vox	Unidas Podemos	CS	Más País	Podemos	Sumar	Lead
2023 election	23 Jul 2023	31.7; 121	33.1; 137	12.4; 33	–	–	(Note: Within Sumar.)		12.3; 31	1.4
El Periódico	23 Jul 2023	28.8; 104	36.0; 140	13.2; 37	–	–			13.1; 34	7.2
El Confidencial	21 Jul 2023	28.2	34.8	12.8	–	–			12.7	6.6
El País	18 Jul 2023	28.3; 108	34.1; 142	12.8; 35	–	–			13.2; 34	5.8
RTVE	17 Jul 2023	28.5; 106	34.5; 142	12.8; 36	–	–			12.8; 33	6.0
Electocracia	17 Jul 2023	28.2; 107/109	34.7; 143/145	13.0; 34/36	–	–			12.6; 30/32	6.5
Electográfica	17 Jul 2023	28.1; 105	34.4; 140	12.7; 35	–	–			13.2; 37	6.3
El Electoral	17 Jul 2023	28.5; 106	34.0; 138	12.9; 37	–	–			13.1; 37	5.5
El Plural	17 Jul 2023	28.2; 109	33.9; 142	13.1; 33	–	–			12.9; 34	5.7
Europe Elects	17 Jul 2023	28.5	34.5	12.9	–	–			13.1	6.0
Politico	17 Jul 2023	28.0	34.0	13.0	–	–			13.0	6.0
PolitPro	17 Jul 2023	27.9	33.7	13.4	–	–			13.3	5.8
Porcentual	17 Jul 2023	28.4; 109	34.0; 142	12.7; 34	–	–			13.3; 33	5.6
Europa Press	16 Jul 2023	28.1	34.7	13.0	–	–			12.8	6.6
Electomanía	16 Jul 2023	28.5	34.6	12.8	–	–			12.9	5.5
Nov. 2019 election	10 Nov 2019	28.0; 120	20.8; 89	15.1; 52	12.9; 35	6.8; 10	2.4; 3	(Note: Within Unidas Podemos.)	–	7.2

== Voter turnout ==
The table below shows registered voter turnout during the election. Figures for election day do not include non-resident citizens, while final figures do.

Region	Time (Election day)									Final		
Region	14:00			18:00			20:00			Final		
Region	2019	2023	+/–	2019	2023	+/–	2019	2023	+/–	2019	2023	+/–
Andalusia	35.80%	42.06%	+6.26	54.84%	53.19%	−1.65	68.23%	69.02%	+0.79	65.91%	66.61%	+0.70
Aragon	41.18%	42.08%	+0.90	57.88%	52.56%	−5.32	71.50%	73.02%	+1.52	69.34%	70.71%	+1.37
Asturias	34.42%	39.04%	+4.62	53.50%	54.11%	+0.61	65.47%	71.14%	+5.67	58.12%	62.90%	+4.78
Balearic Islands	30.95%	37.27%	+6.32	47.40%	48.58%	+1.18	58.71%	63.56%	+4.85	56.81%	61.32%	+4.51
Basque Country	40.18%	37.20%	−2.98	57.60%	52.43%	−5.17	68.93%	67.62%	−1.31	66.43%	65.09%	−1.34
Canary Islands	27.07%	28.90%	+1.83	44.36%	45.40%	+1.04	60.47%	63.59%	+3.12	55.44%	58.18%	+2.74
Cantabria	39.12%	43.00%	+3.88	59.28%	60.45%	+1.17	70.83%	75.37%	+4.54	65.74%	69.94%	+4.20
Castile and León	37.29%	41.37%	+4.08	56.70%	54.85%	−1.85	71.36%	74.44%	+3.08	66.61%	69.41%	+2.80
Castilla–La Mancha	38.07%	44.70%	+6.63	57.44%	56.28%	−1.16	71.38%	74.42%	+3.04	70.06%	72.99%	+2.93
Catalonia	40.58%	36.79%	−3.79	59.88%	48.72%	−11.16	72.14%	65.43%	−6.71	69.40%	62.68%	−6.72
Extremadura	37.17%	45.16%	+7.99	54.41%	55.81%	+1.40	69.12%	73.71%	+4.59	67.22%	71.67%	+4.45
Galicia	31.96%	39.01%	+7.05	53.24%	55.97%	+2.73	66.62%	73.15%	+6.53	55.86%	61.41%	+5.55
La Rioja	40.42%	45.76%	+5.34	57.45%	57.12%	−0.33	71.27%	74.86%	+3.59	66.96%	70.19%	+3.23
Madrid	40.98%	40.83%	−0.15	61.50%	53.70%	−7.80	74.55%	74.15%	−0.40	70.59%	69.66%	−0.93
Murcia	39.01%	44.24%	+5.23	57.89%	55.09%	−2.80	69.99%	70.79%	+0.80	68.03%	68.68%	+0.65
Navarre	39.38%	41.28%	+1.90	56.46%	51.77%	−4.69	69.30%	69.86%	+0.56	65.91%	66.37%	+0.46
Valencian Community	42.51%	46.24%	+3.73	59.97%	57.93%	−2.04	71.71%	73.64%	+1.93	69.80%	71.50%	+1.70
Ceuta	27.27%	27.44%	+0.17	43.77%	39.30%	−4.47	56.19%	55.66%	−0.47	53.98%	53.19%	−0.79
Melilla	24.61%	23.30%	−1.31	38.98%	31.94%	−7.04	57.12%	49.81%	−7.31	52.39%	45.24%	−7.15
Total	37.92%	40.48%	+2.56	56.85%	53.13%	−3.72	69.86%	70.41%	+0.55	66.23%	66.59%	+0.36

== Results ==
=== Congress of Deputies ===
← Summary of the 23 July 2023 Congress of Deputies election results →
Parties and alliances	Popular vote			Seats	
Parties and alliances	Votes	%	±pp	Total	+/−
People's Party (PP)	8,160,837	33.06	+12.25	137	+48
Spanish Socialist Workers' Party (PSOE)	7,821,718	31.68	+3.68	121	+1
Vox (Vox)	3,057,000	12.38	−2.70	33	−19
Unite (Sumar)^{1}	3,044,996	12.33	−3.01	31	−7
Republican Left of Catalonia (ERC)	466,020	1.89	−1.74	7	−6
Together for Catalonia (Junts)^{2}	395,429	1.60	n/a	7	+3
Basque Country Gather (EH Bildu)	335,129	1.36	+0.22	6	+1
Basque Nationalist Party (EAJ/PNV)	277,289	1.12	−0.44	5	−1
Animalist Party with the Environment (PACMA)^{3}	169,237	0.69	−0.25	0	±0
Galician Nationalist Bloc (BNG)	153,995	0.62	+0.12	1	±0
Canarian Coalition (CCa)^{4}	116,363	0.47	n/a	1	±0
Popular Unity Candidacy–For Rupture (CUP–PR)	99,644	0.40	−0.62	0	−2
Navarrese People's Union (UPN)^{5}	52,188	0.21	n/a	1	−1
Workers' Front (FO)	46,274	0.19	New	0	±0
New Canaries–Canarian Bloc (NC–BC)^{4}	45,595	0.18	n/a	0	−1
Empty Spain (España Vaciada)	36,793	0.15	+0.07	0	−1
Aragon Exists–Exists Coalition (Existe)^{6}	20,440	0.08	±0.00	0	−1
Soria Now! (SY)	9,697	0.04	New	0	±0
Empty Spain (España Vaciada)	5,472	0.02	New	0	±0
Empty Spain–Castilian Party–Commoners' Land (EV–PCAS–TC)	1,184	0.00	New	0	±0
Catalan European Democratic Party–CiU Space (PDeCAT–E–CiU)^{2}	32,016	0.13	n/a	0	−4
Zero Cuts (Recortes Cero)	23,421	0.09	−0.05	0	±0
For a Fairer World (PUM+J)	23,290	0.09	−0.02	0	±0
Leonese People's Union (UPL)	23,201	0.09	+0.05	0	±0
Communist Party of the Workers of Spain (PCTE)	18,218	0.07	+0.02	0	±0
Yes to the Future (GBai)	9,938	0.04	−0.01	0	±0
Forward Andalusia (Adelante Andalucía)	9,191	0.04	New	0	±0
Blank Seats to Leave Empty Seats (EB)	8,448	0.03	+0.01	0	±0
Jaén Deserves More (JM+)	8,293	0.03	New	0	±0
For Ávila (XAV)	7,362	0.03	+0.01	0	±0
Extremaduran Bloc (BQEx)	5,807	0.02	New	0	±0
Walking Together (CJ)	5,620	0.02	New	0	±0
Spanish Phalanx of the CNSO (FE de las JONS)	4,683	0.02	+0.02	0	±0
Aragonese Party (PAR)	4,173	0.02	New	0	±0
Humanist Party (PH)	2,902	0.01	±0.00	0	±0
For Huelva (XH)	1,931	0.01	New	0	±0
Let's Go Palencia (VP)	1,917	0.01	New	0	±0
Zamora Yes (ZSí)	1,843	0.01	New	0	±0
Burgalese Way (VB)	1,774	0.01	New	0	±0
For My Region (Por Mi Región)^{7}	1,698	0.01	±0.00	0	±0
Canaries Now–Communist Party of the Canarian People (ANC–UP–PCPC)^{8}	1,674	0.01	±0.00	0	±0
Self-employed Party (Partido Autónomos)	1,446	0.01	New	0	±0
Valencian Welfare State (EVB)	1,442	0.01	New	0	±0
Coalition for Melilla (CpM)	1,298	0.01	−0.03	0	±0
Together for Granada (JxG)	1,218	0.00	New	0	±0
Regionalist Party of the Leonese Country (PREPAL)	964	0.00	±0.00	0	±0
We Are Cáceres (Somos Cc)	963	0.00	New	0	±0
People from Almería–Regionalists for Almería (ALM)	874	0.00	New	0	±0
Federation of Independents of Aragon (FIA)	506	0.00	±0.00	0	±0
Seniors in Action (3e)	484	0.00	New	0	±0
Castilian Unity (UdCa)	463	0.00	New	0	±0
Alive Land Palencia Independent Group (GIPTV)	366	0.00	New	0	±0
State of Spain Unionist Party (PUEDE)	269	0.00	New	0	±0
Catalonia Among Neighbors (EVR)	265	0.00	New	0	±0
Free (LB)	263	0.00	New	0	±0
United Yes (Unidos SI)	253	0.00	±0.00	0	±0
System Money Referendum (+RDS+)	165	0.00	New	0	±0
Citizens of Democratic Centre (CCD)	153	0.00	New	0	±0
Civic Force (Fuerza Cívica)	115	0.00	New	0	±0
Citizens–Party of the Citizenry (Cs)	n/a	n/a	−6.80	0	−10
Regionalist Party of Cantabria (PRC)	n/a	n/a	−0.28	0	−1
Blank ballots	200,673	0.81	−0.09		
Total	24,688,087			350	±0
Valid votes	24,688,087	98.94	−0.04		
Invalid votes	264,360	1.06	+0.04		
Votes cast / turnout	24,952,447	66.59	+0.36		
Abstentions	12,517,011	33.41	−0.36		
Registered voters	37,469,458				
Sources
Footnotes: ^{1} Unite results are compared to the combined totals of United We Can, More Country, More Left and Aragonese Union in the November 2019 election.; ^{2} Within the Together for Catalonia–Together alliance in the November 2019 election.; ^{3} Animalist Party with the Environment results are compared to Animalist Party Against Mistreatment of Animals totals in the November 2019 election.; ^{4} Within the Canarian Coalition–New Canaries alliance in the November 2019 election.; ^{5} Within the Sum Navarre alliance in the November 2019 election.; ^{6} Aragon Exists–Exists Coalition results are compared to Teruel Exists totals in the November 2019 election.; ^{7} For My Region results are compared to We Are Region totals in the November 2019 election.; ^{8} Canaries Now–Communist Party of the Canarian People results are compared to the combined totals of Canaries Now and Communist Party of the Canarian People in the November 2019 election.

Popular vote
PP	33.06%
PSOE	31.68%
Vox	12.38%
Sumar	12.33%
ERC	1.89%
Junts	1.60%
EH Bildu	1.36%
EAJ/PNV	1.12%
BNG	0.62%
CCa	0.47%
UPN	0.21%
Others	2.46%
Blank ballots	0.81%

Seats
PP	39.14%
PSOE	34.57%
Vox	9.43%
Sumar	8.86%
ERC	2.00%
Junts	2.00%
EH Bildu	1.71%
EAJ/PNV	1.43%
BNG	0.29%
CCa	0.29%
UPN	0.29%

=== Senate ===
← Summary of the 23 July 2023 Senate of Spain election results →
Parties and alliances	Popular vote			Seats	
Parties and alliances	Votes	%	±pp	Total	+/−
People's Party (PP)	23,536,366	34.54	+7.70	120	+37
Spanish Socialist Workers' Party (PSOE)^{1}	21,970,469	32.24	+1.64	72	−20
Unite (Sumar)^{2}	7,551,985	11.08	−2.88	0	±0
Vox (Vox)	7,249,087	10.64	+5.36	0	−2
Left for Independence (ERC–EH Bildu)^{3}	2,845,828	4.18	−1.95	7	−5
Republican Left of Catalonia (ERC–Esquerres per la Independència)	1,836,731	2.70	−2.10	3	−8
Basque Country Gather (EH Bildu–Independentzia Ezkerretik)	1,009,097	1.48	+0.15	4	+3
Together for Catalonia (Junts)^{4}	1,251,626	1.84	n/a	1	−2
Basque Nationalist Party (EAJ/PNV)	859,968	1.26	−0.55	4	−5
Animalist Party with the Environment (PACMA)^{5}	671,290	0.98	−0.56	0	±0
Galician Nationalist Bloc (BNG)	516,032	0.76	+0.11	0	±0
Canarian Coalition (CCa)^{6}	205,273	0.30	n/a	0	±0
Navarrese People's Union (UPN)^{7}	188,577	0.28	n/a	1	−2
Empty Spain (España Vaciada)	142,452	0.21	+0.12	0	−2
Exists Coalition (Existe)^{8}	75,490	0.11	+0.02	0	−2
Soria Now! (SY)	31,387	0.05	New	0	±0
Empty Spain (España Vaciada)	16,759	0.02	New	0	±0
Asturias Exists–Empty Spain (Asturias Existe EV)	11,923	0.02	New	0	±0
Empty Spain–Castilian Party–Commoners' Land (EV–PCAS–TC)	6,893	0.01	New	0	±0
Leonese People's Union (UPL)	94,571	0.14	+0.07	0	±0
Zero Cuts (Recortes Cero)	84,437	0.12	−0.08	0	±0
Communist Party of the Workers of Spain (PCTE)	66,622	0.10	+0.06	0	±0
New Canaries–Canarian Bloc (NC–BC)^{6}	66,327	0.10	n/a	0	±0
For a Fairer World (PUM+J)	62,785	0.09	−0.02	0	±0
Catalan European Democratic Party–CiU Space (PDeCAT–E–CiU)^{4}	49,302	0.07	n/a	0	±0
Blank Seats to Leave Empty Seats (EB)	41,038	0.06	+0.02	0	±0
Yes to the Future (GBai)	37,375	0.05	−0.03	0	±0
Forward Andalusia (Adelante Andalucía)	33,041	0.05	New	0	±0
For Ávila (XAV)	28,153	0.04	+0.01	0	±0
Ibiza and Formentera in the Senate (PSOE–SMR–EU–Ara Eivissa)^{9}	26,389	0.04	±0.00	1	±0
Extremaduran Bloc (BQEx)	24,783	0.04	New	0	±0
Aragonese Party (PAR)	18,402	0.03	New	0	±0
Walking Together (CJ)	17,309	0.03	New	0	±0
Spanish Phalanx of the CNSO (FE de las JONS)	16,382	0.02	+0.01	0	±0
Humanist Party (PH)	14,986	0.02	−0.02	0	±0
Jaén Deserves More (JM+)	14,342	0.02	New	0	±0
For Huelva (XH)	9,769	0.01	New	0	±0
Together for Granada (JxG)	8,505	0.01	New	0	±0
For My Region (Por Mi Región)^{10}	7,907	0.01	−0.01	0	±0
Zamora Yes (ZSí)	7,660	0.01	New	0	±0
Burgalese Way (VB)	5,510	0.01	New	0	±0
We Are Cáceres (Somos Cc)	4,773	0.01	New	0	±0
Valencian Welfare State (EVB)	4,034	0.01	New	0	±0
Gomera Socialist Group (ASG)	3,996	0.01	±0.00	1	±0
Regionalist Party of the Leonese Country (PREPAL)	3,737	0.00	−0.01	0	±0
Canaries Now–Communist Party of the Canarian People (ANC–UP–PCPC)^{11}	3,461	0.01	±0.00	0	±0
Let's Go Palencia (VP)	3,244	0.00	New	0	±0
Coalition for Melilla (CpM)	2,671	0.00	−0.03	0	±0
People from Almería–Regionalists for Almería (ALM)	2,649	0.00	New	0	±0
Alive Land Palencia Independent Group (GIPTV)	2,532	0.00	New	0	±0
Federation of Independents of Aragon (FIA)	2,197	0.00	±0.00	0	±0
Independent Herrenian Group (AHI)^{12}	2,189	0.00	±0.00	1	+1
Castilian Unity (UdCa)	1,805	0.00	New	0	±0
Catalonia Among Neighbors (EVR)	1,749	0.00	New	0	±0
Seniors in Action (3e)	642	0.00	New	0	±0
Free (LB)	629	0.00	New	0	±0
State of Spain Unionist Party (PUEDE)	520	0.00	New	0	±0
Citizens of Democratic Centre (CCD)	467	0.00	New	0	±0
Herrenian Assembly (AH)	360	0.00	New	0	±0
Blank ballots (Note: The percentage of blank ballots is calculated over the official number of valid votes cast, irrespective of the total number of votes shown as a result of adding up the individual results for each party.)	385,805	1.59	−0.30		
Total	68,152,008			208	±0
Valid votes	24,285,035	97.72	+0.02		
Invalid votes	567,497	2.28	−0.02		
Votes cast / turnout	24,852,532	66.33	+0.42		
Abstentions	12,616,926	33.67	–0.42		
Registered voters	37,469,458				
Sources
Footnotes: ^{1} Spanish Socialist Workers' Party results are compared to Spanish Socialist Workers' Party totals in the November 2019 election, not including results in Ibiza–Formentera.; ^{2} Unite results are compared to the combined totals of United We Can, More Country, More Left and Aragonese Union in the November 2019 election, not including results in Ibiza–Formentera.; ^{3} Left for Independence results are compared to the combined totals of Republican Left of Catalonia–Sovereigntists and Basque Country Gather in the November 2019 election, not including results in Ibiza–Formentera.; ^{4} Within the Together for Catalonia–Together alliance in the November 2019 election.; ^{5} Animalist Party with the Environment results are compared to Animalist Party Against Mistreatment of Animals totals in the November 2019 election.; ^{6} Within the Canarian Coalition–New Canaries alliance in the November 2019 election.; ^{7} Within the Sum Navarre alliance in the November 2019 election.; ^{8} Empty Spain results are compared to Teruel Exists totals in the November 2019 election.; ^{9} Ibiza and Formentera in the Senate results are compared to the combined totals of Spanish Socialist Workers' Party, United We Can and Republican Left of Catalonia in Ibiza–Formentera in the November 2019 election.; ^{10} For My Region results are compared to We Are Region totals in the November 2019 election.; ^{11} Canaries Now–Communist Party of the Canarian People results are compared to the combined totals of Canaries Now and Communist Party of the Canarian People in the November 2019 election.; ^{12} Independent Herrenian Group results are compared to Canarian Coalition–New Canaries totals in El Hierro in the November 2019 election.

Popular vote
PP	34.54%
PSOE	32.24%
Sumar	11.08%
Vox	10.64%
IPLI	4.18%
Junts	1.84%
EAJ/PNV	1.26%
UPN	0.28%
EFS	0.04%
ASG	0.01%
AHI	0.00%
Others	3.19%
Blank ballots	1.60%

Seats
PP	57.69%
PSOE	34.62%
IPLI	3.37%
EAJ/PNV	1.92%
Junts	0.48%
UPN	0.48%
EFS	0.48%
ASG	0.48%
AHI	0.48%

=== Maps ===
Election results by constituency (Congress).

Vote winner strength by constituency (Congress).

Vote winner strength by autonomous community (Congress).

== Aftermath ==
=== Outcome ===
The election results showed that PP won 33.1 percent of popular vote and 137 seats in the Congress of Deputies, while PSOE won 31.7 percent of popular vote and 121 seats in the Congress of Deputies. Despite the PP gaining 48 seats and increasing its vote share by over 12 points, its result was well below expectations to reach above 150 or 160 seats and insufficient to secure a right-wing majority to govern. Conversely, the PSOE overperformed polls by improving upon previous results, gaining almost 1 million votes—the most votes gained by the prime minister's party in Spain after a full first term in office—scoring its best result since the 2008 Spanish general election in terms of votes and vote share.

Vox won 33 seats, losing 19 seats that it won in the previous election, while Sumar won 31 seats. In part due to a campaign led by the Assemblea Nacional Catalana encouraging pro-Catalan independence voters to boycott the election, pro-independence parties lost 46% of the votes they won in November 2019, materializing in the loss of 9 seats and in the anti-capitalists of the Popular Unity Candidacy (CUP) being expelled from Congress.

=== Government formation ===
During the campaign period, news agencies mentioned that in case of a PP victory, it would have to rely on Vox for a parliamentary majority, despite Feijóo saying that he would prefer a minority government instead. The election results later showed that even PP and Vox together would not have enough seats to form a majority, considering that they won 170 seats in total. Both PP and PSOE, short of a majority, claimed victory. The results raised the prospect of no government forming and a snap election being called, which would constitute a record third straight time in which regular general elections were inconclusive and required a following snap election. The Catalan party Junts—led by former Catalan president and fugitive Carles Puigdemont—was widely seen as being the kingmaker, with both blocs having to rely on their favourable vote to form a government, likely coupled with further concessions on Catalan independence. Due to the underperformance of the right-wing bloc, Feijóo's leadership was questioned by the Spanish right-wing; Feijóo went from offering a pact to the PSOE to warning of a rupture if Sánchez was confirmed prime minister with the support of separatists. The election of the president of the Congress of Deputies—or speaker—on 17 August saw the PSOE candidate Francina Armengol winning in a vote which was seen to boost Sanchez's hopes of re-election.

King Felipe VI summoned the political parties for a round of talks on 21 and 22 August to decide whether to nominate a candidate for investiture. The king faced a difficult choice as, for the first time in the democratic era, two candidates—Sánchez and Feijóo—were equally intent on being nominated. Feijóo's intentions were unchanged by his recent parliamentary setback, despite calls from some factions within his party asking him to "leave the fiction" of insisting that he had the required support for his investiture.

Despite Feijóo's investiture being widely expected to fail, the King nominated him as candidate on 22 August. He justified his decision by stating that the PP had won the most seats and that, since no other clear majority for investiture had been evidenced during the round of talks, the tradition of nominating the leader of the largest party should continue, while allowing for the fact that other candidates could be nominated if their investiture attempt was unsuccessful.

Investiture; Congress of Deputies; Nomination of Alberto Núñez Feijóo (PP)
Ballot →	27 September 2023	29 September 2023 (Note: 1 Junts MP involuntarily cast an invalid ballot in the 29 September vote.)
Required majority →	176 out of 350	Simple
Yes: • PP (137); • Vox (33); • CCa (1); • UPN (1)	172 / 350	172 / 350
No: • PSOE (121); • Sumar (31); • ERC (7); • Junts (7) (6 on 29 Sep); • EH Bildu (6); • PNV (5); • BNG (1)	178 / 350	177 / 350
Abstentions	0 / 350	0 / 350
Absentees	0 / 350	0 / 350

Following Feijóo's defeat, King Felipe VI summoned all parties to a new round of talks on 2 and 3 October, after which he nominated Pedro Sánchez as the next candidate to attempt the investiture. Upon his nomination, Sánchez commented that he was "not going to a false investiture", adding that everything agreed to secure the investiture would be "within the Constitution" and that agreements would be "transparent and known", considered to be a reference to criticisms of the amnesty proposed by pro-Catalan independence parties.

Investiture; Congress of Deputies; Nomination of Pedro Sánchez (PSOE)
Ballot →	16 November 2023
Required majority →	176 out of 350
Yes: • PSOE (121); • Sumar (31); • ERC (7); • Junts (7); • EH Bildu (6); • PNV (5); • BNG (1); • CCa (1)	179 / 350
No: • PP (137); • Vox (33); • UPN (1)	171 / 350
Abstentions	0 / 350
Absentees	0 / 350

== Bibliography ==
Legislation

- Constitución Española (Constitution). Official State Gazette (in Spanish). 27 December 1978 [version as of 27 September 2011]. BOE-A-1978-31229.
- Ley Orgánica 5/1985, de 19 de junio, del Régimen Electoral General (Organic Law 5/1985). Official State Gazette (in Spanish). 19 June 1985 [version as of 9 June 2023]. BOE-A-1985-11672.
- Real Decreto 400/2023, de 29 de mayo, de disolución del Congreso de los Diputados y del Senado y de convocatoria de elecciones (Royal Decree 400/2023). Official State Gazette (in Spanish). 29 May 2023. BOE-A-2023-12663.

Other

- Carreras de Odriozola, Albert; Tafunell Sambola, Xavier (2005) [1989]. Estadísticas históricas de España, siglos XIX-XX (PDF) (in Spanish). Vol. 1 (II ed.). Bilbao: Fundación BBVA. pp. 1072–1097. ISBN 84-96515-00-1. Archived from the original (PDF) on 24 September 2015.
