= Ramón Tamames =

Spanish economist and politician

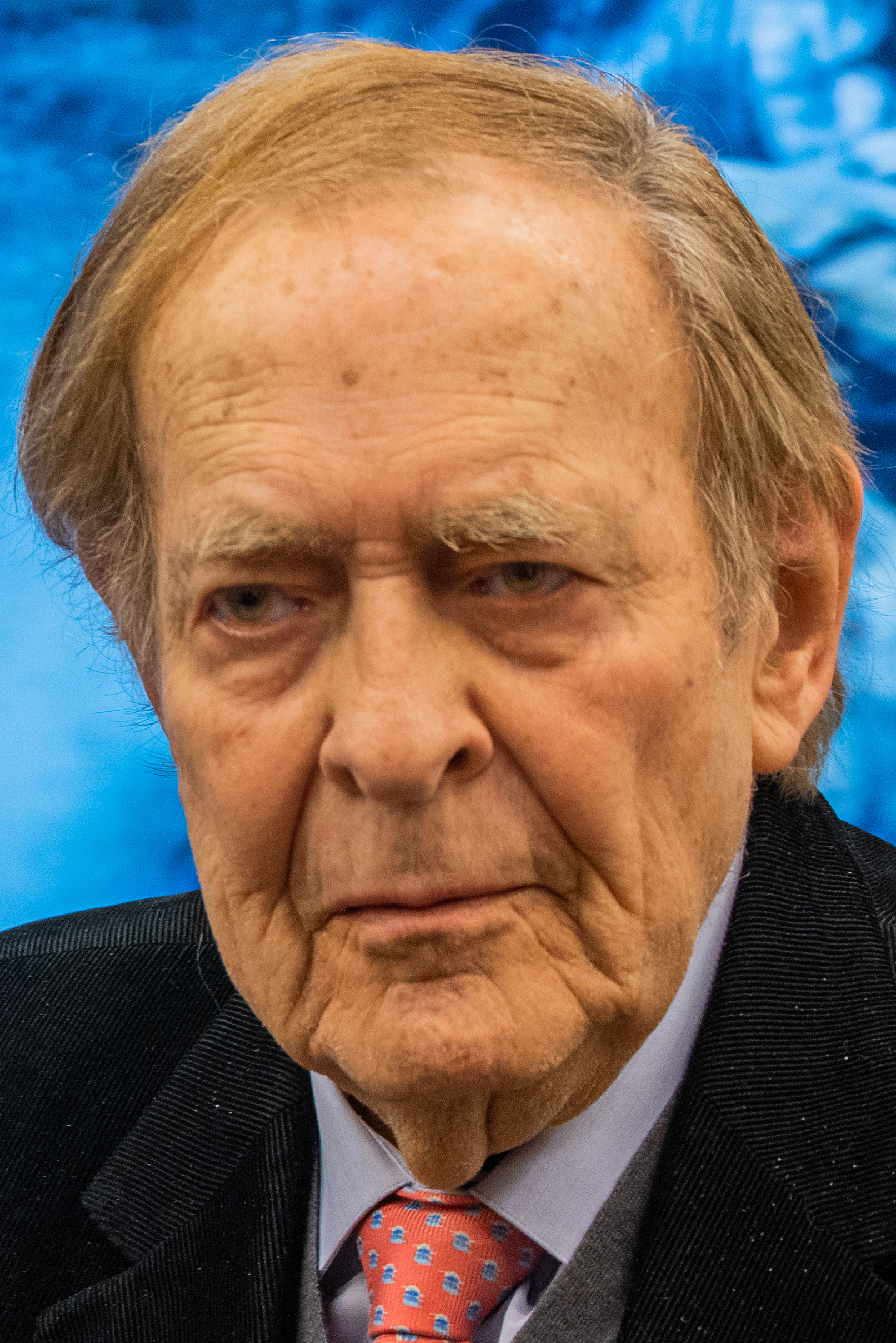

Ramón Tamames Gómez (born 1 November 1933) is a Spanish economist and former politician.

He was a member of the Congress of Deputies and the City Council of Madrid in the early years after the Spanish transition to democracy. A long-term member of the Communist Party of Spain (PCE), he left in 1982 and founded the Progressive Federation (FP) and the United Left (IU). He left politics in 1989 after several months with the Democratic and Social Centre (CDS). In 2023, aged 89, he was proposed as a candidate for prime minister of Spain in a vote of no confidence tabled by Vox.

== Biography ==
Tamames was born in Madrid as one of five children in a wealthy family in which his father was a surgeon. Suffering from anaemia, he spent some of his early years with his grandparents in rural Extremadura. His mother died by suicide when he was seven, due to her husband's alleged infidelities. He was educated at the Lycée Français de Madrid before obtaining degrees in law and economics in the city, concluding his studies at the London School of Economics. He had three children with his wife, Carmen Prieto-Castro.

Tamames joined the Communist Party of Spain (PCE) when it was still illegal in 1956. He entered their executive in 1976 and was elected to the Congress of Deputies in the first democratic elections in 1977. In 1979, he was elected to the City Council of Madrid, again the first such democratic elections. The PCE formed a pact with the Spanish Socialist Workers' Party (PSOE), whose leader Enrique Tierno Galván became mayor and Tamames his first deputy. He quit the PCE in 1981 due to disputes with leader Santiago Carrillo, and in 1984 he established the Progressive Federation (FP). He helped establish the United Left (IU) and was elected to Congress again in 1986. In 1989 he left for the Democratic and Social Centre (CDS) of former prime minister Adolfo Suárez. He declined to stand for them in that year's election, and quit politics.

In February 2023, aged 89, Tamames put himself forward to be an independent candidate for prime minister if a Vox-proposed motion of no confidence in the government of Pedro Sánchez were successful. The motion failed on 22 March with 52 votes in favour (Vox plus former Citizens legislator Pablo Cambronero), 91 abstentions (People's Party plus one independent) and 201 votes against.
