= Progressive Federation =

Progressive Federation Federación Progresista
- Leader: Ramón Tamames
- Founded: 1984
- Dissolved: 1988
- Split from: Communist Party of Spain
- Ideology: Democratic socialism Ecologism; Pacifism; Progressivism
- Political position: Left-wing
- National affiliation: United Left (1986–1987)
- Union affiliation: Comisiones Obreras (CCOO)
- Colors

Progressive Federation (in Spanish: Federación Progresista; FP) was a socialist, ecologist and pacifist political party in Spain. It was created in 1984 by a group led by Ramón Tamames that split from the Communist Party of Spain (PCE). It was one of the founding parties of United Left.

== History ==
FE was officially registered in December 1984, and in February 1985 the party launched its manifesto. The platform called for a green, red and white alternative for Spain. In July 1985 FP held its constituent congress, and the next year the party participated in the Anti-NATO Civic Platform. In 1986 FP joined United Left, leaving the coalition in 1987. The party dissolved by 1988.

Ramón Tamanes was elected MP (in the lists of the United Left coalition) in the general elections of 1986.

== Electoral performance ==
=== Cortes Generales ===
Cortes Generales
Election	Congress					Senate		Leading candidate	Status in legislature
Election	Votes	%	No.	Seats	+/–	Seats	+/–	Leading candidate	Status in legislature
1986	Within United Left			1 / 350	1	0 / 208	0	Ramón Tamames	Opposition
