= 2023 Spanish elections =

2023 Spanish elections may refer to one of two nationwide elections held in Spain on 28 May 2023:

- 2023 Spanish local elections, to elect local seats in Spanish municipalities, provinces and island councils.
- 2023 Spanish regional elections, to elect the regional parliaments of twelve autonomous communities.

For the Spanish general election held in the same year, see 2023 Spanish general election.
