= Digital transition =

Move from an analog system to a digital format

Digital transition refers to the process of moving an existing analog system to a digital format. Used without further qualifiers, the term normally refers to the move from analog television to digital television, the digital television transition. Other examples include digital radio services and the conversion of other broadcast standards.

The term is sometimes used to describe the digitization of other formats like the conversion of books to electronic format, but these tasks normally fall under the topic of digital transformation.
