= Iberian exception =

Spanish and Portuguese energy policy

The Iberian exception (IE) is a set of legal measures introduced by the governments of Spain and Portugal to reduce electricity prices for Spanish and Portuguese consumers.

== Implementation ==
European wholesale energy prices rose to unparalleled levels in 2022 as a result of the global energy crisis. The Spanish and Portuguese governments introduced measures to separate power prices from the prices of European markets, beginning 15 June 2022, to keep prices low for consumers. It functioned by an upper limit on the price charged by gas producers, and compensated for their losses when international gas prices went above the limit. It was funded by additional payments from Iberian consumers.

== Effect ==
The measures were effective in reducing the price for consumers. The price reduction stimulated greater demand for electricity; this demand was fulfilled with gas, leading to increased carbon dioxide emissions. Overall, non-fossil fuel producers saw a loss, while fossil fuel producers saw an increase to profits.
