= Pablo Cambronero =

Spanish politician

Pablo Emérito Cambronero Piqueras (born 1 September 1979) is a Spanish politician. He was elected to the Parliament of Andalusia in December 2018 and the Congress of Deputies in April and November 2019. He was elected while representing Citizens, and left the party in March 2021 to sit as an independent.

== Biography ==
Born in Cuenca, Castilla–La Mancha, Cambronero obtained a bachelor's and a master's degree in law. He joined Citizens in 2014 and was elected to the Parliament of Andalusia in the 2018 Andalusian regional election. He left this seat in order to be the party's lead candidate in the Seville constituency of the Congress of Deputies in the elections of April and November 2019, being elected both times.

In March 2021, Cambronero left Citizens to sit as an independent. He criticised party leader Inés Arrimadas for allegedly moving to the left, as well as the party's attempt to align with the Spanish Socialist Workers' Party (PSOE) and pass a motion of no confidence against the government of the Region of Murcia. Two years later, he was the only deputy except the 52 of Vox to vote in favour of an unsuccessful vote of no confidence tabled by that party against PSOE prime minister of Spain Pedro Sánchez.
