= Kitchen affair =

Corruption scandal in Spain

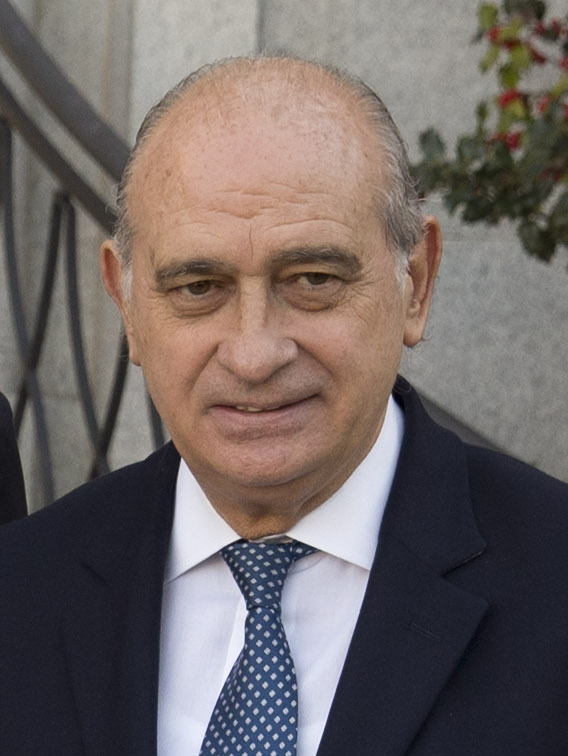
Jorge Fernández Díaz in 2013

The Kitchen affair (Spanish: caso Kitchen) or Operation Kitchen (for cocina in Spanish) is a political corruption case in Spain involving an alleged police misconduct, espionage and deep state network operated by the Ministry of the Interior under Jorge Fernández Díaz, during the premiership of Mariano Rajoy.

This alleged conspiracy was attributed responsibility of an operation to steal sensitive information from the former treasurer of the People's Party (PP), Luis Bárcenas, which could harm high-ranking officials of this political party as a result of the Bárcenas affair. The conspiracy also reportedly operated through the so-called "patriotic police," which supposedly spied on people, fabricated evidence, and bribed false witnesses with the complicity of various media outlets that published the fake news and judges who initiated legal proceedings, all with the aim of damaging the personal and family reputations of political rivals, specifically leaders of Podemos (through the so-called "P.I.S.A. report", an acronym for Pablo Iglesias Sociedad Anónima, Pablo Iglesias Inc.), pro-Catalan independence politicians (Operation Catalonia), and Pedro Sánchez (then the Spanish opposition leader) and his family. This alleged conspiracy was referred to as the "Interior Ministry's sewers" and the "PP's sewers".

Fernández Díaz himself became directly involved in the scandal in June 2016, after leaked recordings showed him and the head of Catalonia's anti-fraud office, Daniel de Alfonso, discussing an alleged plot to fabricate scandals against pro-Catalan independence politicians.

Following the preliminary investigation at the Spanish National Court, the trial began in April 2026.
