= Animal welfare and rights in Spain =

Treatment of and laws concerning non-human animals in Spain

Animal welfare and rights in Spain is about the treatment of and laws concerning non-human animals in Spain. Spain has moderate animal protections by international standards.

== Regulations ==
In 1877, Spain passed its first provision on animal cruelty, which prohibited the mistreatment of dogs. The Criminal Code of 1928 was the first law to incriminate the abuse or mistreatment of animals in general.

Spain's current Penal Code imposes a penalty of three months to one year for cruelly mistreating pets or unjustifiably causing death or serious physical impairment. This legislation applies only to pets, and it is not clear whether this legislation protects animals from suffering caused by a failure to act.

Law 32/2007 provides that the government will take measures to ensure that farm animals are not caused unnecessary suffering, and was enacted in order to comply with European Union requirements on farm animal welfare. Spain has at times been found lacking in the implementation of these provisions; for instance, in 2011 the European Commission issued a reasoned opinion calling on Spain to address deficiencies in complying with legislation on the welfare of animals at slaughter, and in 2012 the Commission called on Spain via letter of formal notice to take action in implementing the ban on barren battery cages. Animal nonprofit Compassion in World Farming has also reported evidence of non-compliance with EU animal welfare law related to pigs, including tail docking, sow stalls, and bedding.

Law 32 also provides for the licensing of the use of animals in research, prohibits testing cosmetics on animals, and incorporates the Three Rs principles (reduce the number of animals used, refine methods to minimize suffering, and replace animal models where it is deemed possible).

Spain's 17 provincial autonomous communities have power to legislate beyond the Law 32 provisions.

In 2014 and again in 2020, Spain received a C out of possible grades A, B, C, D, E, F, G on World Animal Protection's Animal Protection Index.

== Animal issues ==
=== Animals used for food ===
==== Animal agriculture ====
In 2013, Spain was producing approximately 600 million broiler chickens and 35 million egg-laying hens annually; these numbers were fairly constant over the preceding decade. The pig meat production is Spain's largest livestock sector, and it has grown significantly since the 1980s. In 2014 the swine sector accounted for 37% of final livestock production and 14% of final agricultural production in Spain. In 2014, 43,483,000 pigs were killed for food. Between January and October 2015, nearly 2 million cows were killed for food. Figures on the number of marine animals killed for food are not readily available, but in 2013 Spain caught 882,000 tons of wild fish and in 2012 produced 262,000 tons of aquaculture fish.

As of a 2012 report by the Food and Agriculture Organization, Spain was the fifth-highest rabbit meat producer in the world, slaughtering around 50 million rabbits per year. In investigations of 72 Spanish rabbit farms and 4 slaughterhouses from 2012-2014, animal activist group Animal Equality found common use of blunt force trauma to kill rabbits, workers throwing live rabbits into waste containers due to over-production, animals with open wounds or infections left in cages without veterinary treatment, cannibalism among some animals due to over-crowding, farms which had never received health and bio-security inspections, and dead animals rotting in cages next to live animals.

==== Veganism ====
Figures on the number of vegans in Spain are not readily available. However, in 2007 the EU estimated that 4% of the Spanish population was vegetarian, while a 2012 article placed the proportion at 0.5%. Plant-based diets appear to be gaining in popularity; the number of vegan or vegetarian restaurants listed in Spain increased from 353 in 2011 to 686 in 2014.

=== Animals used for research ===
According to official statistics, 821,570 research procedures were performed on non-human animals in Spain in 2014. Mice, rats, fish, and birds accounted for 93% of research animals in Spain. Of these procedures, 53% were categorized as subthreshold or mild, 27% as mild, 8% severe, and 12% non-recovery (i.e. the animal was killed).

=== Festivals ===
Approximately 60,000 animals are killed in festivals throughout Spain each year. Activities at these festivals include pulling the heads off live chickens, throwing live turkeys off a church tower, bullfighting, chasing bulls off piers into the sea, chasing bulls down the streets with flaming brands attached to their horns, and dragging a bull by its horns and forcing it to bow in front of the statue of a saint before being slaughtered. An estimated 11,000 bulls were tortured and killed in Spanish festivals in 2014.

=== Animals used for clothing ===
As of 2013, Spain was producing approximately 700,000 mink pelts annually, with mink fur production rapidly growing. In undercover investigation of the Spanish mink farm Eurozeltifur, animal activist group Animal Equality obtained footage of mink with severed limbs due to cannibalism, and of mink killed by the standard method of gas poisoning, which causes seizures, edema, and bleeding in the lungs before the mink die.

=== Animal personhood ===
In 2007, Spain's Balearic Islands province granted legal personhood to great apes. In 2008, Spain's lower house of Parliament passed a non-binding resolution granting legal personhood to apes, but the formal actions needed from the federal government to make this formal law have not been taken.

== Animal activism ==
The first Spanish animal rights group, Association for the Defense of Animal Rights (ADDA), was founded in 1975. The ADDA's activities include lobbying for improved animal welfare policies at local, regional, national, and European levels (e.g. pushing for bans on bullfighting in Barcelona and Catalonia), conducting informational campaigns, and promoting alternatives to animal testing.

In 2003, the first political party against animal cruelty, the Animalist Party Against Mistreatment of Animals (PACMA), was founded. PACMA has yet to reach representation in the national parliament.

In 2007, Animal Equality activists conducted an open rescue of three pigs from a Spanish pig farm. Also in 2007, eleven Animal Liberation Front activists were detained after releasing roughly 20,000 mink from a fur farm. In 2011, a group of unknown activists removed 36 dogs from Isoquimem, a company which breeds dogs for research, generating one of the largest media responses in the history of the Spanish animal rights movement.

The international animal activist nonprofit Animal Equality is active in Spain, having conducted undercover investigations of animal farms, open rescues of farmed animals, bull-fighting protests, distributing leaflets about veganism, and at one point in 2014 having the most social media followers of any non-governmental organization in Spain.

== See also ==
- Cruelty to animals
- Animal rights movement
- Animal consciousness
- Speciesism
- Intensive animal farming
- Spanish-style bullfighting
- Timeline of animal welfare and rights in Europe
