= 2023 vote of no confidence in the government of Pedro Sánchez =

Spanish parliamentary vote

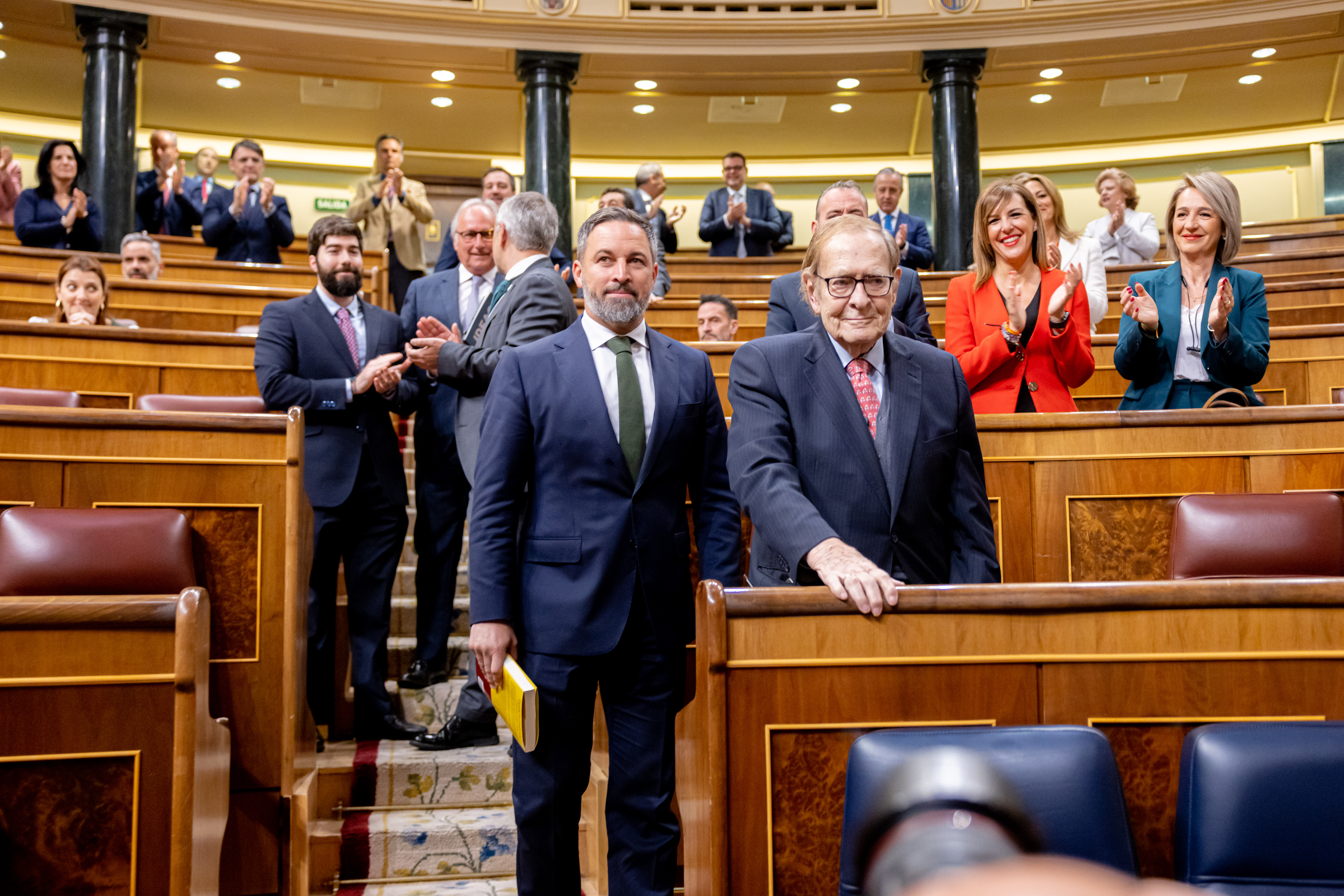
- Vox leader Santiago Abascal and the party's candidate in the motion, Ramón Tamames, during the first day of debate on the vote of no confidence
- Date: 21–22 March 2023 (1 day)
- Location: Congress of Deputies, Spain
- Type: Motion of no confidence
- Cause: The Spanish government's proposed reforms to the criminal code on embezzlement and sedition
- Participants: PSOE; PP; Vox; Unidas Podemos; CS; ERC; PNV; EH Bildu; Junts; PDeCAT; Más País; CUP; Foro; Compromís; CCa; BNG; PRC; TE
- Outcome: Motion rejected

A motion of no confidence in the Spanish government of Pedro Sánchez was debated and voted in the Congress of Deputies between 21 and 22 March 2023. It was brought by far-right Vox in response to Sánchez's proposed reforms of the Criminal Code to modify the embezzlement and sedition crimes, which the party regarded as a "self-coup". It was the sixth motion of no confidence in Spain since the country's transition to democracy.

Vox announced that it would not field party leader Santiago Abascal as candidate for the motion—its second during the term of the 14th Cortes Generales—instead proposing an independent figure, which it struggled to find until 89-year old former politician Ramón Tamames accepted the task. The opposition People's Party (PP) under Alberto Núñez Feijóo stated that it would not vote against the motion—unlike the 2020 vote—but that it would abstain instead.

== Legal provisions ==
The Spanish Constitution of 1978 required for motions of no confidence to be proposed by at least one-tenth of the Congress of Deputies—35 out of 350. Following the German model, votes of no confidence in Spain were constructive, so the motion was required to include an alternative candidate for prime minister. For a motion of no confidence to be successful, it had to be passed by an absolute majority in the Congress of Deputies. A minimum period of five days from the motion's registration (dubbed as "cooling period") was required to pass before it could come up for a vote, but no maximum was established. Other parties were entitled to submit alternative motions within the first two days from the registration.

1. The Congress of Deputies may challenge Government policy by passing a motion of censure by an absolute majority of its members.
2. The motion of censure must be proposed by at least one tenth of the Deputies, including a candidate for the office of President of the Government.
3. The motion of censure may not be voted on until five days after it has been submitted. During the first two days of this period, alternative motions may be submitted.
4. If the motion of censure is not passed by the Congress, its signatories may not submit another during the same session.

— Article 113 of the Spanish Constitution

Concurrently, the Prime Minister was barred from dissolving the Cortes Generales and calling a general election while a motion of no confidence was pending. If the motion was successful, the incumbent prime minister and their government were required to submit their resignation to the Monarch, while the candidate proposed in the motion was automatically considered to have the confidence of the Congress of Deputies and immediately appointed as prime minister. If unsuccessful, the signatories of the motion were barred from submitting another during the same session.

The procedure for motions of no confidence was regulated within Articles 175 to 179 of the Standing Orders of the Congress of Deputies, which provided for the debate on the motion starting with its defence by one of the signatory members without any time limitations, to be followed by an also time-unlimited speech by the nominated candidate to explain their political programme. Subsequently, spokespeople from the different parliamentary groups in Congress were allowed to speak for thirty minutes, with an opportunity to reply or rectify themselves for ten minutes. Members of the government were allowed to take the floor and speak at any time of their request during the debate.

== Events ==
=== Prelude ===
On 9 December 2022, the far-right party Vox announced that it would table a motion of no confidence on the government of Pedro Sánchez under an independent candidate with government experience, voicing that Sánchez's proposed reforms of the Criminal Code to modify the embezzlement and sedition crimes were akin to a "self-coup" similar to "that of Pedro Castillo in Peru" two days earlier.

After a period in which Vox was unable to get the consent of any of the candidates it reached out for, on 1 February 2023 the party proposed economist and former politician Ramón Tamames, aged 89, to lead the motion. Tamames accepted on 21 February, with the motion's registration being announced for the next Monday.

=== Party positions ===
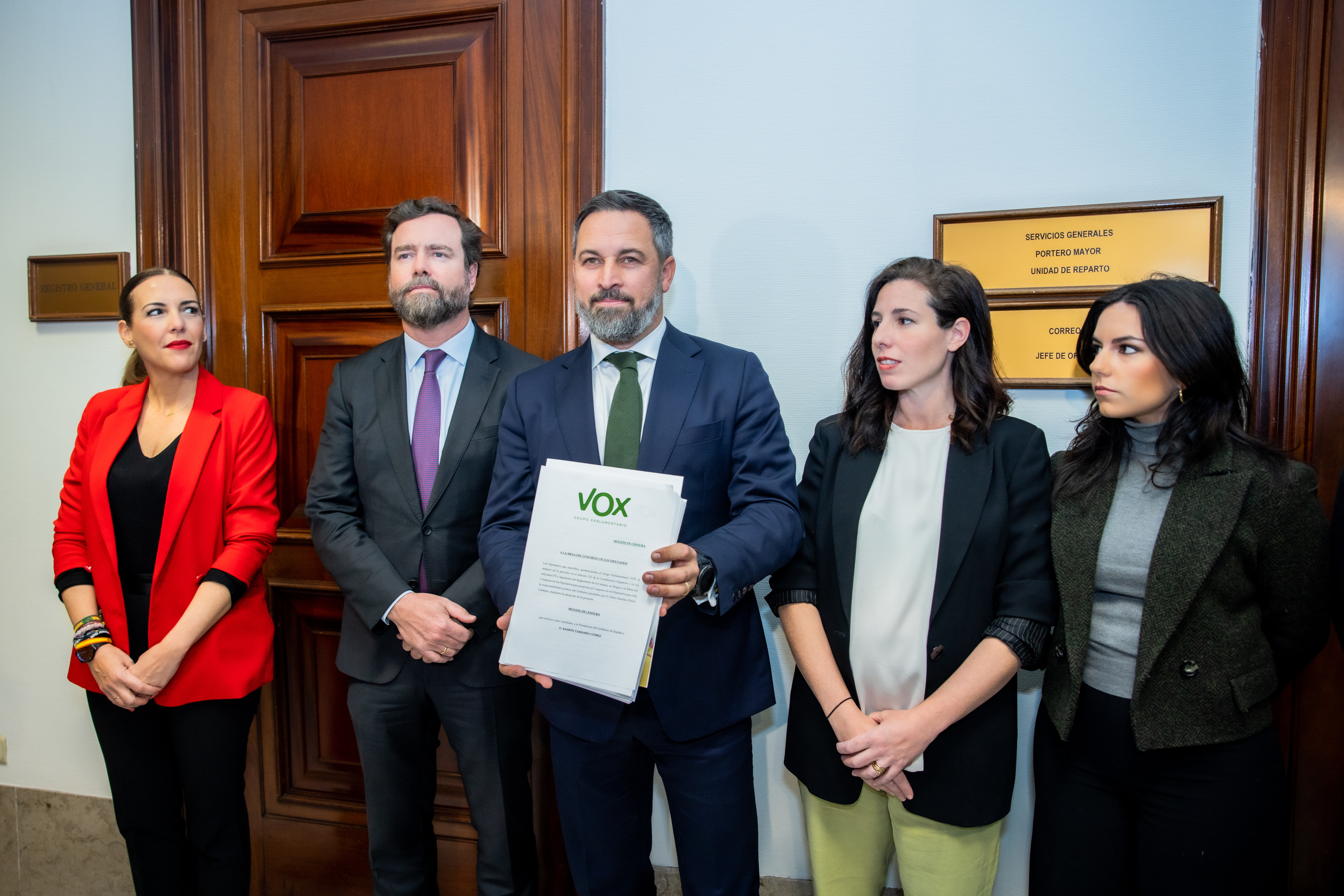
Leader of Vox Santiago Abascal in the Congress of Deputies on 27 February 2023, submitting the required signatures to table the motion of no confidence.

Aside of the governing parties—the Spanish Socialist Workers' Party (PSOE) and Unidas Podemos—it was received with the opposition from Republican Left of Catalonia (ERC), the Basque Nationalist Party (PNV), EH Bildu, Together for Catalonia (JxCat), the Catalan European Democratic Party (PDeCAT), Más País, Commitment Coalition (Compromís), New Canaries (NCa), the Galician Nationalist Bloc (BNG) and Teruel Existe (TE). The leader of the Regionalist Party of Cantabria (PRC) and president of Cantabria, Miguel Ángel Revilla, announced that his party would not support a motion of no confidence on Sánchez's government. Citizens (CS) also announced its "No" vote to the motion, branding it as "useless as an option to guarantee progress, freedom and equality" of the Spaniards.

The leader of the People's Party (PP), Alberto Núñez Feijóo, had regarded the motion as a "parliamentary show" but announced that his party would not vote against it—as it did in 2020—without clarifying whether it would abstain or even vote in favour of it, depending on the proposed candidate. On 23 February, after the motion's candidate had been revealed, Feijóo announced that his party would abstain "out of respect to the biography and academic level of Professor Tamames".

=== Debate and vote ===
Tamames's speech denounced what Vox perceived as maneuvers against the separation of powers towards an "absorbing autocracy" with abuse of the decree-law, elimination of the crime of sedition or reduction of sentences for embezzlement, support in pro-independence parties, little conciliatory line of government, partisan manipulation of history, attacks on legal certainty and businessmen of prestige, among many other reasons.

Motion of no confidence Congress of Deputies; Nomination of Ramón Tamames (INDEP)
| Ballot → | 22 March 2023 |
| Required majority → | 175 out of 349 (Note: Due to the vacancy of Unidas Podemos MP Alberto Rodríguez's seat, the effective absolute majority was at 175.) |
| Yes: • Vox (52); • INDEP (1) | 53 / 350 |
| No: • PSOE (120); • UP–ECP–GeC (30); • ERC (13); • CS (9); • PNV (6); • EH Bildu (4); • JxCat (4); • PDeCAT (4); • Más País (2); • CUP (2); • CCa (2); • Compromís (1); • BNG (1); • PRC (1); • TE (1); • INDEP (1) | 201 / 350 |
| Abstentions: • PP (88); • PN (2); • Foro (1) | 91 / 350 |
| Absentees: • UP–ECP–GeC (3); • EH Bildu (1) | 4 / 350 |

== Opinion polls ==
Opinion polling conducted in the days during and after the events of the vote of no confidence showed a large opposition to the motion. Shown in reverse chronological order, with the most recent first and using the dates when the survey fieldwork was done, as opposed to the date of publication (except in cases where the fieldwork dates are unknown):

Opinion on the motion of no confidence
| Polling firm/Commissioner | Fieldwork date | Sample size | Support | Reject | Neither | Question | Notes |
|---|---|---|---|---|---|---|---|
| DYM/Henneo | 23–24 Mar 2023 | 1,008 | 18.9 | 63.3 | —N/a | 17.8 | (Note: Question asked was "Did you think it was appropriate for Vox to table this motion of no confidence?" 18.9% said "Yes", 63.3% "No" and 17.8% either did not know or did not answer.) |
| Data10/Okdiario | 22 Mar 2023 | 1,816 | 29.7 | 55.5 | —N/a | 14.8 | (Note: Question asked was on whether Vox was wrong in tabling a motion of no confidence that it knew it was going to lose. 29.7% said that it was "right" and 55.5% that it was "wrong".) |
| Sigma Dos/El Mundo | 22 Mar 2023 | 1,816 | 28.1 | 63.4 | —N/a | 8.5 | (Note: Question asked was on whether the motion's tabling was considered as appropriate. 28.1% said "yes" and 63.4% "No".) |
| DYM/Henneo | 15–19 Feb 2023 | 1,003 | 26.2 | 53.2 | —N/a | 20.6 | (Note: Question asked was "Are you in favor or against Vox tabling a motion of no confidence at this time?" 26.2% were "in support", 53.2% "against" and 20.6% either did not know or did not answer.) |
