= Opinion polling for the November 2019 Spanish general election =

Surveys held before the November 2019 Spanish general election

In the run up to the November 2019 Spanish general election, various organisations carried out opinion polling to gauge voting intention in Spain during the term of the 13th Cortes Generales. Results of such polls are displayed in this article. The date range for these opinion polls is from the previous general election, held on 28 April 2019, to the day the next election was held, on 10 November 2019.

Voting intention estimates refer mainly to a hypothetical Congress of Deputies election. Polls are listed in reverse chronological order, showing the most recent first and using the dates when the survey fieldwork was done, as opposed to the date of publication. Where the fieldwork dates are unknown, the date of publication is given instead. The highest percentage figure in each polling survey is displayed with its background shaded in the leading party's colour. If a tie ensues, this is applied to the figures with the highest percentages. The "Lead" columns on the right shows the percentage-point difference between the parties with the highest percentages in a poll.

== Electoral polling ==
=== Nationwide polling ===
==== Graphical summary ====
Local regression trend line of poll results from 28 April 2019 to 10 November 2019, with each line corresponding to a political party.

==== Voting intention estimates ====
The table below lists nationwide voting intention estimates. Refusals are generally excluded from the party vote percentages, while question wording and the treatment of "don't know" responses and those not intending to vote may vary between polling organisations. When available, seat projections determined by the polling organisations are displayed below (or in place of) the percentages in a smaller font; 176 seats were required for an absolute majority in the Congress of Deputies.

Color key:

Poll conducted after legal ban on opinion polls

| Polling firm/Commissioner | Fieldwork date | Sample size | Turnout | PSOE | PP | Cs | Unidas Podemos | Vox | ERC–Sobiranistes | JxCat | PNV | EH Bildu | Compromís | CC–NCa | NA+ | PRC | Más País | CUP | Lead |
|---|---|---|---|---|---|---|---|---|---|---|---|---|---|---|---|---|---|---|---|
| November 2019 general election | 10 Nov | —N/a | 66.2 | 28.0; 120 | 20.8; 89 | 6.8; 10 | 12.9; 35 | 15.1; 52 | 3.6; 13 | 2.2; 8 | 1.6; 6 | 1.1; 5 | (Note: Within Más País.) | 0.5; 2 | 0.4; 2 | 0.3; 1 | 2.4; 3 | 1.0; 2 | 7.2 |
| NC Report/La Razón | 10 Nov | ? | ? | 26.9; 115/118 | 21.4; 95/97 | 8.9; 14/15 | 12.5; 31/32 | 13.6; 44/46 | 3.8; 14/15 | 1.7; 6/7 | 1.7; 6/7 | 1.0; 4/5 | | 0.7; 2/3 | 0.5; 1/2 | 0.2; 1 | 3.0; 2/4 | 1.0; 2/3 | 5.5 |
| SocioMétrica/El Español | 9–10 Nov | 4,000 | ? | 26.1; 112/118 | 19.9; 87/92 | 7.8; 11/16 | 14.0; 36/40 | 14.1; 52/58 | 3.5; 11/14 | 1.7; 6/7 | 1.5; 6/7 | 1.1; 4/5 | | 0.4; 1/2 | 0.3; 1/2 | 0.2; 0/1 | 3.4; 0/5 | 1.5; 2/3 | 6.2 |
| Celeste-Tel/eldiario.es | 8–10 Nov | 1,100 | 67.8 | 27.4; 119 | 20.8; 94 | 8.5; 14 | 12.9; 33 | 13.5; 44 | 3.6; 14 | 1.8; 7 | 1.7; 7 | 1.1; 5 | | 0.8; 3 | 0.4; 2 | 0.2; 1 | 2.8; 3 | 1.1; 3 | 6.6 |
| GAD3/RTVE–FORTA | 25 Oct–10 Nov | 13,000 | 72 | 27.3; 114/119 | 20.1; 85/90 | 8.5; 14/15 | 12.2; 30/34 | 16.3; 56/59 | 3.5; 13/14 | 1.6; 6/7 | 1.5; 6/7 | 1.0; 3/4 | | 0.5; 1/2 | 0.4; 2 | 0.2; 0/1 | 2.1; 3 | 1.2; 3/4 | 7.2 |
| GESOP/El Periòdic | 7–9 Nov | 903 | 70–72 | 26.7; 116/122 | 19.4; 83/88 | 7.9; 14/18 | 14.3; 39/44 | 14.9; 47/53 | 2.6; 12/13 | 1.4; 6/7 | – | – | | – | – | – | 2.8; 2/4 | 1.1; 3/4 | 7.3 |
| ElectoPanel/Electomanía | 7–8 Nov | 1,250 | ? | 27.1; 113 | 20.4; 90 | 7.3; 11 | 13.7; 38 | 15.5; 54 | 3.7; 14 | 1.6; 6 | 1.5; 6 | 1.0; 4 | | 0.7; 2 | 0.4; 2 | 0.2; 1 | 3.0; 3 | 1.2; 4 | 6.7 |
| GESOP/El Periòdic | 6–8 Nov | 903 | ? | 26.3; 113/118 | 19.0; 80/85 | 7.5; 10/15 | 14.0; 38/42 | 15.6; 54/60 | 2.7; 12/13 | 1.4; 6/7 | – | – | | – | – | – | 2.9; 2/4 | 1.1; 3/4 | 7.3 |
| Demoscopia Servicios/ESdiario | 7 Nov | ? | 72.1 | 26.6; 116 | 20.9; 93 | 7.2; 12 | 13.2; 35 | 15.7; 52 | 4.1; 15 | 1.5; 6 | 1.5; 6 | 1.0; 4 | | 0.6; 2 | 0.4; 2 | 0.3; 1 | 2.7; 3 | 1.0; 2 | 5.7 |
| ElectoPanel/Electomanía | 6–7 Nov | 1,250 | ? | 27.3; 114 | 20.1; 90 | 7.8; 13 | 13.5; 37 | 15.2; 51 | 3.7; 14 | 1.6; 6 | 1.5; 6 | 1.0; 4 | | 0.7; 2 | 0.4; 2 | 0.2; 1 | 3.1; 3 | 1.2; 4 | 7.2 |
| GESOP/El Periòdic | 5–7 Nov | 904 | ? | 26.9; 115/120 | 20.1; 84/88 | 6.5; 8/10 | 13.4; 36/40 | 15.6; 54/59 | 2.7; 12/13 | 1.6; 6/7 | – | – | | – | – | – | 2.5; 2/4 | 1.4; 4 | 6.8 |
| PSOE | 6 Nov | ? | ? | 30.0; 120/130 | ? 75/80 | 7.0; 15 | ? 35 | 15.0; 50/55 | – | – | – | – | – | – | – | – | – | – | ? |
| ElectoPanel/Electomanía | 5–6 Nov | 1,250 | ? | 27.3; 118 | 20.2; 90 | 8.1; 14 | 13.1; 34 | 14.8; 50 | 3.7; 14 | 1.6; 6 | 1.5; 6 | 1.0; 4 | | 0.7; 2 | 0.4; 2 | 0.2; 1 | 3.1; 3 | 1.2; 3 | 7.1 |
| Hamalgama Métrica/Okdiario | 4–6 Nov | ? | ? | ? 118 | ? 98 | ? 14 | ? 33 | ? 43 | ? 15 | ? 7 | – | – | | – | – | – | ? 2 | – | ? |
| GESOP/El Periòdic | 4–6 Nov | 905 | ? | 26.8; 115/120 | 19.9; 84/88 | 7.0; 10/14 | 13.0; 34/38 | 15.6; 53/58 | 3.0; 13/14 | 1.5; 6/7 | – | – | | – | – | – | 2.6; 2/4 | 1.3; 4 | 6.9 |
| ElectoPanel/Electomanía | 4–5 Nov | 1,250 | ? | 27.1; 117 | 20.4; 90 | 8.4; 14 | 12.8; 34 | 14.7; 51 | 3.8; 14 | 1.7; 6 | 1.5; 6 | 1.1; 4 | | 0.7; 2 | 0.4; 2 | 0.2; 0 | 3.1; 3 | 1.3; 4 | 6.7 |
| GESOP/El Periòdic | 3–5 Nov | 904 | ? | 26.8; 116/121 | 19.0; 80/85 | 7.8; 12/16 | 12.6; 32/36 | 15.6; 53/58 | 3.3; 13/14 | 1.8; 6/7 | – | – | | – | – | – | 2.8; 2/4 | 1.4; 4 | 7.8 |
| KeyData/Público | 4 Nov | ? | 71.2 | 27.4; 121 | 21.1; 96 | 9.5; 20 | 12.7; 34 | 12.5; 39 | 3.8; 15 | 1.9; 6 | 1.5; 6 | 1.0; 3 | | 0.5; 2 | ? 2 | ? 1 | 3.7; 4 | ? 1 | 6.3 |
| ElectoPanel/Electomanía | 3–4 Nov | 1,250 | ? | 27.2; 118 | 20.8; 91 | 8.7; 14 | 12.8; 34 | 14.1; 48 | 3.9; 14 | 1.6; 6 | 1.5; 6 | 1.1; 4 | | 0.6; 2 | 0.4; 2 | 0.2; 1 | 3.1; 3 | 1.2; 4 | 6.4 |
| GESOP/El Periòdic | 31 Oct–4 Nov | 861 | ? | 26.6; 115/120 | 19.0; 80/85 | 8.2; 13/17 | 12.8; 34/38 | 15.0; 50/55 | 3.6; 14/15 | 1.5; 6/7 | – | – | | – | – | – | 2.8; 2/4 | 1.5; 4/5 | 7.6 |
| GI Internacional/Diario16 | 3 Nov | ? | ? | 28.5; 122/139 | 21.2; 94/95 | 9.5; 21/26 | 13.2; 35/40 | 9.5; 27/31 | 4.2; 15/17 | 1.6; 4/5 | 1.6; 6/7 | 1.3; 5/6 | | 0.2; 1 | 0.4; 1/2 | 0.3; 1 | 4.3; 5/7 | 0.5; 1/2 | 7.3 |
| ElectoPanel/Electomanía | 2–3 Nov | 1,250 | ? | 27.1; 117 | 21.2; 95 | 8.5; 14 | 12.5; 34 | 13.6; 44 | 4.0; 14 | 1.5; 6 | 1.6; 6 | 1.0; 4 | | 0.6; 2 | 0.4; 2 | 0.2; 1 | 3.4; 4 | 1.3; 4 | 5.9 |
| Infortécnica | 2 Nov | 1,586 | ? | ? 130/139 | ? 80/86 | ? 25/31 | ? 27/33 | ? 33/39 | – | – | – | – | – | – | – | – | – | – | ? |
| ElectoPanel/Electomanía | 1–2 Nov | 1,250 | ? | 27.5; 120 | 21.4; 96 | 8.8; 14 | 12.6; 34 | 13.1; 41 | ? 14 | ? 6 | ? 6 | ? 4 | | ? 2 | ? 2 | ? 1 | 3.4; 4 | ? 4 | 6.1 |
| SocioMétrica/El Español | 31 Oct–2 Nov | 1,100 | ? | 25.1; 110/119 | 20.6; 93/100 | 8.5; 15/18 | 12.9; 36/40 | 14.3; 42/48 | 3.5; 13/15 | 1.6; 5/7 | 1.3; 6/7 | 0.9; 3/4 | | 0.6; 1/2 | 0.4; 1/2 | 0.2; 1/2 | 3.9; 1/3 | 1.4; 2/4 | 4.5 |
| Demoscopia Servicios/ESdiario | 30 Oct–2 Nov | ? | ? | 27.3; 120 | 22.1; 99 | 9.2; 16 | 12.8; 33 | 12.7; 39 | ? 15 | ? 6 | ? 6 | ? 4 | | ? 2 | ? 2 | ? 1 | 3.8; 4 | ? 2 | 5.2 |
| IMOP/El Confidencial | 29 Oct–2 Nov | 1,639 | 68 | 28.0; 118/128 | 19.6; 81/90 | 10.1; 19/24 | 11.5; 29/34 | 13.9; 42/50 | ? 14/16 | ? 5/7 | ? 6/7 | ? 3/4 | | ? 2 | ? 2 | ? 0/1 | 3.3; 3/5 | ? 3/4 | 8.4 |
| SW Demoscopia/infoLibre | 28 Oct–2 Nov | 1,517 | ? | 28.5; 123/128 | 20.3; 88/93 | 8.8; 15/19 | 12.0; 34/38 | 13.7; 41/46 | 4.0; 16 | 1.4; 6 | ? 6 | – | | – | ? 2 | – | 4.7; 3/6 | 0.8; 1 | 8.2 |
| ElectoPanel/Electomanía | 31 Oct–1 Nov | 1,250 | ? | 27.5; 121 | 21.6; 97 | 9.2; 16 | 12.5; 34 | 12.5; 37 | 4.0; 15 | 1.6; 6 | 1.6; 6 | 1.0; 4 | | 0.6; 2 | 0.4; 2 | 0.3; 1 | 3.6; 5 | 1.2; 2 | 5.9 |
| ElectoPanel/Electomanía | 30–31 Oct | 1,250 | ? | 27.6; 123 | 21.4; 97 | 9.0; 15 | 12.5; 34 | 12.5; 38 | ? 15 | ? 5 | ? 6 | ? 4 | | ? 2 | ? 2 | ? 1 | 3.5; 4 | ? 3 | 6.2 |
| Hamalgama Métrica/Okdiario | 29–31 Oct | 1,000 | 68.2 | 27.2; 120 | 22.2; 100 | 8.8; 16 | 12.7; 32 | 12.8; 40 | 3.9; 14 | 1.6; 6 | 1.5; 6 | 1.0; 4 | | 0.7; 2 | 0.4; 2 | 0.2; 1 | 3.7; 5 | 1.1; 2 | 5.0 |
| Sondaxe/La Voz de Galicia | 28–31 Oct | 1,001 | 72.8 | 26.5; 114 | 20.4; 96 | 9.3; 18 | 12.1; 32 | 12.6; 42 | 4.1; 14 | 1.8; 7 | 1.5; 6 | 1.6; 6 | | 0.5; 2 | 0.4; 2 | 0.2; 1 | 3.7; 5 | 1.2; 4 | 6.1 |
| GESOP/El Periódico | 28–31 Oct | 1,504 | ? | 27.7; 119/123 | 19.5; 84/87 | 8.0; 13/17 | 13.4; 37/41 | 14.2; 49/53 | 3.6; 14/15 | 1.5; 5/6 | – | – | | – | – | – | 2.6; 2/4 | 1.5; 4/5 | 8.2 |
| InvyMark/laSexta | 28–31 Oct | ? | ? | 27.9 | 22.0 | 9.9 | 11.8 | 10.5 | – | – | – | – | | – | – | – | 3.8 | – | 5.9 |
| Celeste-Tel/eldiario.es | 25–31 Oct | 1,100 | 67.8 | 27.6; 121 | 21.9; 99 | 9.2; 16 | 12.9; 33 | 12.0; 36 | 3.9; 15 | 1.7; 7 | 1.6; 6 | 1.0; 4 | | 0.8; 3 | 0.4; 2 | 0.2; 1 | 3.2; 4 | 0.9; 2 | 5.7 |
| Sigma Dos/El Mundo | 24–31 Oct | 1,800 | ? | 27.9; 118/126 | 20.3; 89/97 | 8.9; 16/19 | 13.5; 35/40 | 13.2; 39/44 | 4.0; 13/15 | 1.2; 4/6 | 1.4; 5/7 | – | | – | – | – | 4.0; 3/4 | – | 7.6 |
| NC Report/La Razón | 14–31 Oct | ? | 67.1 | 27.3; 114/120 | 22.7; 99/107 | 8.8; 15 | 12.1; 32 | 12.2; 37/39 | 3.9; 15 | 1.6; 7 | 1.6; 6 | 1.0; 4 | | – | – | – | 3.5; 4 | – | 4.6 |
| GAD3/ABC | 14–31 Oct | 7,900 | 70.5 | 27.4; 120/123 | 21.6; 92/95 | 8.0; 15 | 11.2; 28/31 | 14.9; 49 | 3.5; 13/14 | 1.4; 5/6 | 1.5; 6 | 0.8; 3/4 | | 0.4; 1 | 0.4; 2 | 0.2; 1 | 2.8; 3 | 1.6; 4 | 5.8 |
| ElectoPanel/Electomanía | 29–30 Oct | 1,250 | ? | 27.0; 120 | 21.7; 98 | 8.9; 14 | 12.5; 33 | 12.7; 40 | 4.0; 15 | 1.4; 5 | 1.5; 6 | 1.0; 4 | | 0.6; 2 | 0.4; 2 | 0.3; 1 | 3.9; 5 | 1.2; 3 | 5.3 |
| DYM/Prensa Ibérica | 25–30 Oct | 1,005 | ? | 26.8; 115/124 | 19.4; 90/96 | 10.0; 20/24 | 12.5; 31/36 | 13.6; 35/42 | – | – | – | – | | – | – | – | 3.3; 4/5 | – | 7.4 |
| PSOE | 29 Oct | ? | ? | ? 130 | ? 88 | ? 16 | ? 30 | ? 50 | – | – | – | – | – | – | – | – | – | – | ? |
| Ipsos/Henneo | 28–29 Oct | 2,000 | 70 | 26.0; 110/121 | 19.4; 84/95 | 10.0; 18/31 | 13.0; 31/40 | 14.0; 38/52 | 3.5; 13/15 | 2.1; 7/8 | 1.5; 6/7 | – | | – | – | – | 4.7; 4/6 | – | 6.6 |
| ElectoPanel/Electomanía | 28–29 Oct | 1,250 | ? | 26.9; 120 | 21.8; 98 | 9.1; 15 | 12.7; 35 | 12.4; 37 | ? 15 | ? 5 | ? 6 | ? 4 | | ? 2 | ? 2 | ? 1 | 4.1; 5 | ? 3 | 5.1 |
| Hamalgama Métrica/Okdiario | 25–29 Oct | 1,000 | 67.6 | 27.1; 120 | 22.5; 102 | 9.0; 19 | 12.6; 32 | 12.1; 35 | 3.9; 14 | 1.5; 6 | 1.5; 6 | 1.0; 4 | | 0.6; 2 | 0.4; 2 | 0.2; 1 | 3.8; 5 | 1.1; 2 | 4.6 |
| 40dB/El País | 23–29 Oct | 2,002 | ? | 27.3; 108/123 | 21.2; 86/98 | 8.3; 13/16 | 12.4; 30/36 | 13.7; 44/50 | ? 14 | ? 8 | ? 7 | ? 5 | | ? 2 | ? 2 | ? 1 | 4.4; 4/5 | ? 2 | 6.1 |
| Sigma Dos/El Mundo | 21–29 Oct | 1,800 | ? | 27.5; 120 | 20.6; 94 | 8.9; 16 | 13.5; 36 | 13.4; 44 | 4.0; 15 | 1.2; 4 | 1.4; 6 | – | | – | – | – | 3.9; 3 | – | 6.9 |
| ElectoPanel/Electomanía | 27–28 Oct | 1,250 | ? | 26.6; 118 | 21.8; 98 | 9.0; 15 | 12.7; 33 | 12.6; 40 | 4.1; 16 | 1.5; 5 | 1.4; 6 | 1.0; 4 | | 0.6; 2 | 0.4; 2 | 0.3; 1 | 4.0; 5 | 1.2; 3 | 4.8 |
| Sigma Dos/Antena 3 | 27 Oct | ? | ? | 27.1; 116/123 | 20.4; 91/98 | 8.9; 16/19 | 13.2; 35/40 | 13.3; 39/43 | 4.5; 14/17 | 1.2; 4/5 | 1.4; 5/7 | – | | – | – | – | 3.9; 2/3 | 1.1; 3/4 | 6.7 |
| SyM Consulting/EPDA | 26–27 Oct | 1,923 | 72.3 | 27.1; 102/115 | 22.2; 80/94 | 10.3; 35/40 | 9.6; 34/36 | 13.8; 45/49 | 3.5; 11/13 | – | – | – | | – | – | – | 3.3; 3/5 | – | 4.9 |
| ElectoPanel/Electomanía | 26–27 Oct | 1,250 | ? | 26.6; 118 | 21.6; 97 | 9.1; 15 | 12.6; 32 | 12.7; 41 | ? 16 | ? 5 | ? 6 | ? 4 | | ? 2 | ? 2 | ? 1 | 4.1; 5 | ? 4 | 5.0 |
| KeyData/Público | 26 Oct | ? | 70.8 | 27.6; 122 | 21.5; 99 | 10.2; 24 | 12.3; 32 | 10.7; 30 | 3.9; 15 | 1.9; 7 | 1.5; 6 | 1.0; 3 | | 0.5; 2 | ? 2 | ? 1 | 4.6; 6 | ? 1 | 6.1 |
| ElectoPanel/Electomanía | 25–26 Oct | 1,250 | ? | 27.2; 121 | 22.2; 99 | 9.3; 16 | 12.2; 32 | 11.8; 37 | 3.9; 15 | 1.5; 6 | 1.5; 6 | 1.0; 4 | | 0.6; 2 | 0.4; 2 | 0.2; 1 | 4.4; 5 | 1.1; 2 | 5.0 |
| SocioMétrica/El Español | 24–26 Oct | 1,100 | ? | 25.5; 115/119 | 21.0; 99/103 | 9.3; 18/20 | 12.2; 33/35 | 12.2; 37/39 | 3.6; 13/15 | 1.8; 6/7 | 1.3; 6/7 | 1.0; 3/5 | | 0.4; 1/2 | 0.3; 1/2 | 0.3; 1/2 | 5.1; 4/5 | 1.3; 1/3 | 4.5 |
| ElectoPanel/Electomanía | 24–25 Oct | 1,250 | ? | 27.6; 123 | 22.2; 100 | 9.4; 17 | 12.0; 28 | 11.3; 36 | ? 15 | ? 6 | ? 6 | ? 4 | | ? 2 | ? 2 | ? 1 | 4.4; 5 | ? 3 | 5.4 |
| Hamalgama Métrica/Okdiario | 22–25 Oct | 1,000 | 66.4 | 26.9; 119 | 22.7; 103 | 9.2; 20 | 12.7; 33 | 11.7; 33 | 3.9; 14 | 1.5; 6 | 1.5; 6 | 1.0; 4 | | 0.4; 2 | 0.4; 2 | 0.2; 1 | 4.3; 6 | 0.8; 1 | 4.2 |
| InvyMark/laSexta | 21–25 Oct | ? | ? | 28.6 | 21.7 | 10.6 | 11.5 | 10.0 | – | – | – | – | | – | – | – | 4.2 | – | 6.9 |
| NC Report/La Razón | 16–25 Oct | 1,000 | 66.2 | 27.5; 120/123 | 23.0; 103/105 | 9.0; 18/19 | 12.1; 32/34 | 11.3; 30/32 | 4.0; 14/15 | – | 1.7; 6 | – | | – | – | – | 4.3; 4/5 | – | 4.5 |
| ElectoPanel/Electomanía | 23–24 Oct | 1,250 | ? | 27.9; 123 | 22.3; 100 | 9.4; 17 | 12.0; 28 | 11.3; 36 | 4.0; 15 | 1.5; 6 | 1.5; 6 | 1.0; 4 | | 0.6; 2 | 0.4; 2 | 0.2; 1 | 4.2; 5 | 1.1; 3 | 5.6 |
| GAD3/ABC | 21–24 Oct | 2,730 | 69 | 27.3; 118 | 21.7; 100 | 8.9; 17 | 12.7; 34 | 13.5; 41 | 3.2; 13 | 1.6; 7 | 1.4; 6 | 0.9; 3 | | 0.4; 1 | 0.4; 2 | 0.2; 1 | 2.8; 3 | 1.1; 3 | 5.6 |
| Celeste-Tel/eldiario.es | 21–24 Oct | 1,100 | 66.9 | 27.7; 120 | 22.2; 101 | 10.0; 20 | 12.9; 34 | 10.5; 31 | 4.0; 15 | 1.6; 7 | 1.6; 6 | 1.0; 4 | | 0.7; 3 | 0.4; 2 | 0.2; 1 | 4.4; 5 | 0.8; 1 | 5.5 |
| Sigma Dos/El Mundo | 16–24 Oct | 1,600 | ? | 27.0; 120 | 20.8; 97 | 8.6; 16 | 13.1; 34 | 13.0; 41 | 4.4; 17 | 1.3; 4 | 1.4; 6 | – | | – | – | – | 4.0; 4 | – | 6.2 |
| ElectoPanel/Electomanía | 22–23 Oct | 1,250 | ? | 27.6; 123 | 22.1; 99 | 9.9; 19 | 12.2; 31 | 10.9; 33 | ? 15 | ? 5 | ? 6 | ? 4 | | ? 2 | ? 2 | ? 1 | 4.3; 5 | ? 3 | 5.5 |
| ElectoPanel/Electomanía | 21–22 Oct | 1,250 | ? | 27.2; 122 | 22.1; 99 | 9.9; 19 | 12.6; 32 | 10.8; 33 | 3.9; 16 | 1.4; 4 | 1.5; 6 | 1.0; 4 | | 0.6; 2 | 0.4; 2 | 0.2; 1 | 4.4; 5 | 1.2; 3 | 5.1 |
| Hamalgama Métrica/Okdiario | 18–22 Oct | 1,000 | ? | 26.5; 117 | 22.8; 104 | 9.8; 22 | 12.9; 33 | 11.1; 31 | 4.0; 15 | – | – | – | | – | – | – | 4.1; 6 | – | 3.7 |
| Sigma Dos/El Mundo | 11–22 Oct | 1,600 | ? | 27.3; 122 | 21.4; 99 | 8.8; 18 | 12.7; 33 | 12.0; 35 | 4.2; 16 | 1.5; 4 | 1.6; 6 | – | | – | – | – | 4.5; 7 | – | 5.9 |
| ElectoPanel/Electomanía | 20–21 Oct | 1,250 | ? | 26.9; 118 | 22.1; 100 | 10.0; 22 | 12.7; 33 | 10.7; 32 | ? 17 | ? 4 | ? 6 | ? 4 | | ? 2 | ? 2 | ? 1 | 4.6; 5 | ? 2 | 4.8 |
| ElectoPanel/Electomanía | 19–20 Oct | 1,250 | ? | 26.9; 117 | 22.3; 103 | 10.0; 22 | 12.8; 33 | 10.6; 30 | 4.0; 16 | 1.3; 4 | 1.5; 6 | 1.0; 4 | | 0.6; 2 | 0.4; 2 | 0.2; 1 | 4.5; 6 | 1.2; 3 | 4.6 |
| ElectoPanel/Electomanía | 18–19 Oct | 1,250 | ? | 26.7; 115 | 22.4; 103 | 10.1; 23 | 12.9; 35 | 10.5; 28 | ? 16 | ? 4 | ? 6 | ? 4 | | ? 2 | ? 2 | ? 1 | 4.6; 6 | ? 3 | 4.3 |
| ElectoPanel/Electomanía | 17–18 Oct | 1,250 | 69.1 | 26.8; 117 | 22.3; 103 | 10.0; 22 | 12.9; 35 | 10.3; 27 | 4.1; 16 | 1.2; 4 | 1.5; 6 | 1.0; 4 | | 0.6; 2 | 0.4; 2 | 0.3; 1 | 4.5; 5 | 1.3; 4 | 4.5 |
| Hamalgama Métrica/Okdiario | 16–18 Oct | 1,000 | 66.4 | 26.4; 117 | 22.7; 104 | 10.0; 24 | 13.1; 35 | 10.7; 28 | 4.0; 14 | 1.5; 6 | 1.5; 6 | 1.0; 4 | | 0.6; 2 | 0.5; 2 | 0.2; 1 | 3.9; 6 | 0.8; 1 | 3.7 |
| GAD3/ABC | 14–18 Oct | 3,233 | 70 | 28.7; 123 | 23.0; 102 | 8.3; 18 | 11.2; 31 | 11.9; 33 | 3.8; 16 | 1.6; 7 | 1.5; 7 | 0.9; 3 | | 0.3; 1 | 0.5; 2 | 0.3; 1 | 3.7; 4 | 0.9; 1 | 5.7 |
| InvyMark/laSexta | 14–18 Oct | ? | ? | 29.6 | 20.6 | 11.2 | 11.3 | 9.0 | – | – | – | – | | – | – | – | 4.3 | – | 9.0 |
| SocioMétrica/El Español | 14–18 Oct | ? | ? | 26.1; 118/122 | 21.5; 99/104 | 9.7; 19/21 | 11.8; 32/34 | 11.7; 33/35 | 3.3; 13/15 | 1.8; 7/8 | 1.4; 5/7 | 0.9; 3/5 | | 0.3; 1 | 0.3; 1 | 0.2; 1 | 5.6; 4/6 | 1.2; 1/3 | 4.6 |
| NC Report/La Razón | 9–18 Oct | ? | 65.1 | 27.2; 120/122 | 22.8; 104/105 | 9.8; 22/24 | 12.7; 33/36 | 10.6; 24/26 | 4.1; 14/15 | – | 1.7; 6 | – | | – | – | – | 4.1; 4/6 | – | 4.4 |
| ElectoPanel/Electomanía | 16–17 Oct | 1,250 | ? | 27.5; 124 | 21.9; 100 | 9.7; 19 | 12.8; 34 | 10.4; 28 | ? 14 | ? 5 | ? 6 | ? 4 | | ? 2 | ? 2 | ? 1 | 4.3; 5 | ? 4 | 5.6 |
| Ipsos/Henneo | 15–17 Oct | 2,000 | ? | 26.7; 116/120 | 21.7; 96/101 | 9.4; 19/23 | 12.3; 31/35 | 11.8; 32/36 | 4.0; 13/15 | 1.8; 6/7 | 1.4; 6 | – | | – | – | – | 4.6; 5/7 | – | 5.0 |
| Celeste-Tel/eldiario.es | 14–17 Oct | 1,100 | 65.3 | 27.0; 117 | 22.3; 103 | 11.1; 27 | 13.4; 36 | 9.1; 24 | 4.2; 15 | 1.5; 6 | 1.6; 6 | 1.0; 4 | | 0.7; 3 | 0.4; 2 | 0.2; 1 | 4.6; 5 | 0.7; 1 | 4.7 |
| Sigma Dos/El Mundo | 10–17 Oct | 1,600 | ? | 27.0; 121 | 21.0; 97 | 9.6; 19 | 12.5; 32 | 11.5; 36 | 4.2; 16 | 1.5; 4 | 1.7; 7 | – | | – | – | – | 4.6; 7 | – | 6.0 |
| KeyData/Público | 16 Oct | ? | 68.9 | 28.2; 124 | 20.7; 95 | 10.8; 27 | 12.2; 33 | 10.3; 28 | 3.9; 14 | 1.7; 7 | 1.5; 6 | 1.0; 3 | | 0.5; 2 | ? 2 | ? 1 | 4.9; 7 | ? 1 | 7.5 |
| ElectoPanel/Electomanía | 15–16 Oct | 1,250 | ? | 27.7; 124 | 21.4; 96 | 9.5; 19 | 12.4; 32 | 10.9; 33 | 3.9; 14 | 1.5; 6 | 1.5; 6 | 1.0; 4 | | 0.6; 2 | 0.4; 2 | 0.3; 1 | 4.8; 6 | 1.2; 3 | 6.3 |
| ElectoPanel/Electomanía | 14–15 Oct | 1,250 | ? | 27.4; 123 | 21.6; 98 | 9.3; 16 | 12.5; 33 | 10.8; 34 | ? 14 | ? 6 | ? 6 | ? 4 | | ? 2 | ? 2 | ? 1 | 4.7; 6 | ? 3 | 5.8 |
| Hamalgama Métrica/Okdiario | 11–15 Oct | 1,000 | ? | 26.5; 116 | 22.7; 104 | 10.2; 24 | 13.3; 36 | 10.1; 26 | 4.2; 15 | – | – | – | | – | – | ? 1 | 4.0; 6 | – | 3.8 |
| Sigma Dos/El Mundo | 7–15 Oct | 1,600 | ? | 27.1; 122 | 21.2; 98 | 9.3; 19 | 12.8; 33 | 11.3; 34 | 4.2; 16 | 1.4; 4 | 1.7; 7 | – | | – | – | – | 4.2; 6 | – | 5.9 |
| CIS | 21 Sep–13 Oct | 17,650 | ? | 32.2; 133/150 | 18.1; 74/81 | 10.6; 27/35 | 14.6; 37/45 | 7.9; 14/21 | 4.4; 16/18 | 1.8; 4/6 | 1.5; 6/7 | 1.2; 5 | | 0.3; 1/2 | 0.4; 2 | 0.2; 0/1 | 2.9; 3/4 | 0.6; 1/2 | 14.1 |
| Llorente & Cuenca | 9–12 Oct | ? | 68 | 25.8; 115/120 | 21.0; 95/100 | 10.8; 35/40 | 10.9; 35/40 | 8.5; 18/20 | – | – | – | – | | – | – | – | 3.8; 5/8 | – | 4.8 |
| SocioMétrica/El Español | 9–12 Oct | 1,000 | ? | 27.4; 127/129 | 20.9; 95/99 | 9.3; 17/19 | 12.3; 31/33 | 10.5; 32/34 | 3.2; 12/14 | 1.7; 6/8 | 1.4; 5/7 | 1.1; 4/6 | | 0.3; 1 | 0.2; 1 | 0.2; 1 | 5.1; 3/5 | 1.5; 3/5 | 6.5 |
| ElectoPanel/Electomanía | 9–12 Oct | 1,250 | ? | 27.5; 125 | 22.0; 102 | 9.0; 16 | 12.0; 30 | 10.5; 30 | 4.0; 15 | 1.6; 6 | 1.5; 6 | 1.0; 4 | | 0.6; 3 | 0.4; 2 | 0.3; 1 | 4.8; 6 | 0.8; 2 | 5.5 |
| Celeste-Tel/eldiario.es | 7–11 Oct | 1,100 | ? | 27.3; 117 | 22.2; 102 | 11.4; 29 | 13.7; 37 | 8.4; 20 | 4.2; 15 | 1.5; 6 | 1.6; 6 | 1.0; 4 | | 0.7; 3 | 0.4; 2 | 0.2; 1 | 4.9; 7 | 0.7; 1 | 5.1 |
| GAD3/ABC | 7–11 Oct | 3,121 | 68 | 28.4; 126 | 22.2; 98 | 8.6; 20 | 11.9; 32 | 11.8; 33 | 3.2; 13 | 1.8; 7 | 1.4; 7 | 0.9; 3 | | 0.3; 1 | 0.5; 2 | 0.2; 1 | 3.9; 5 | 1.0; 1 | 6.2 |
| Hamalgama Métrica/Okdiario | 7–10 Oct | 1,000 | 65.9 | 26.4; 115 | 22.5; 103 | 10.6; 26 | 13.4; 37 | 9.8; 23 | 4.2; 16 | 1.6; 7 | 1.5; 6 | 1.0; 4 | | 0.6; 2 | 0.5; 2 | 0.2; 1 | 4.1; 7 | 0.7; 1 | 3.9 |
| Sigma Dos/El Mundo | 2–10 Oct | 1,600 | ? | 27.5; 124 | 20.6; 96 | 9.8; 21 | 13.2; 34 | 10.7; 31 | 4.0; 15 | 1.5; 5 | 1.6; 7 | – | | – | – | – | 4.4; 6 | – | 6.9 |
| ElectoPanel/Electomanía | 6–8 Oct | 2,000 | ? | 27.9; 128 | 22.5; 103 | 8.9; 15 | 12.1; 31 | 9.8; 28 | 3.9; 15 | 1.6; 6 | 1.5; 6 | 1.0; 4 | | 0.6; 2 | 0.4; 2 | 0.3; 1 | 4.5; 5 | 0.9; 2 | 5.4 |
| Sigma Dos/El Mundo | 30 Sep–8 Oct | 1,600 | ? | 27.9; 124 | 21.3; 98 | 10.0; 22 | 12.6; 35 | 10.2; 28 | 3.6; 14 | 1.7; 7 | 1.6; 6 | – | | – | – | – | 4.3; 6 | – | 6.6 |
| ElectoPanel/Electomanía | 2–5 Oct | ? | ? | 26.4 | 22.4 | 10.1 | 12.1 | 8.7 | – | – | – | – | | – | – | – | 6.0 | – | 4.0 |
| KeyData/Público | 4 Oct | ? | 68.6 | 28.4; 124 | 20.0; 93 | 11.6; 36 | 12.1; 34 | 9.1; 19 | 3.6; 14 | 1.6; 7 | 1.3; 6 | 1.0; 3 | | 0.4; 1 | ? 2 | ? 1 | 5.9; 10 | – | 8.4 |
| Celeste-Tel/eldiario.es | 1–4 Oct | 1,100 | 65.7 | 27.2; 118 | 21.8; 99 | 12.2; 37 | 13.9; 37 | 7.5; 13 | 4.2; 15 | 1.6; 6 | 1.6; 6 | 1.0; 4 | | 0.7; 2 | 0.5; 2 | 0.2; 1 | 5.1; 9 | 0.5; 1 | 5.4 |
| Simple Lógica | 1–4 Oct | 1,046 | 66.3 | 29.1 | 19.1 | 10.0 | 12.5 | 12.2 | – | – | – | – | | – | – | – | 5.2 | – | 10.0 |
| SocioMétrica/El Español | 1–4 Oct | 1,000 | ? | 27.2; 122/126 | 20.7; 93/97 | 10.6; 28/31 | 11.7; 29/32 | 10.9; 27/31 | 3.5; 12/16 | 1.8; 6/8 | 1.3; 5/7 | 1.1; 4/6 | | 0.4; 1 | 0.3; 1 | 0.2; 1 | 5.5; 4/6 | 1.2; 0/1 | 6.5 |
| GAD3/ABC | 30 Sep–4 Oct | 3,121 | 67 | 27.2; 122 | 20.9; 93 | 11.0; 29 | 12.4; 33 | 10.6; 29 | 3.8; 15 | 1.6; 7 | 1.5; 7 | 0.9; 3 | | 0.3; 1 | 0.5; 2 | 0.2; 1 | 4.3; 7 | 0.9; 1 | 6.3 |
| Hamalgama Métrica/Okdiario | 30 Sep–4 Oct | 900 | 65.9 | 26.1; 115 | 22.1; 98 | 11.7; 34 | 13.5; 39 | 8.5; 17 | 4.3; 16 | 1.7; 6 | 1.6; 6 | 1.0; 4 | | 0.6; 3 | 0.5; 2 | 0.2; 1 | 4.6; 8 | 0.6; 1 | 4.0 |
| InvyMark/laSexta | 30 Sep–4 Oct | ? | ? | 29.9 | 20.5 | 11.7 | 11.2 | 7.7 | – | – | – | – | | – | – | – | 4.6 | – | 9.4 |
| IMOP/El Confidencial | 1–3 Oct | 1,227 | 65.7 | 28.3 | 20.1 | 10.7 | 12.0 | 10.8 | 3.3 | 2.2 | 1.6 | 1.0 | | – | – | – | 4.1 | 1.1 | 8.2 |
| GESOP/El Periódico | 30 Sep–3 Oct | 1,005 | ? | 28.0; 124/128 | 19.6; 87/91 | 10.4; 24/28 | 12.2; 32/36 | 10.3; 24/28 | 3.2; 12/13 | 1.8; 6/7 | – | – | | – | – | – | 5.5; 8/12 | 1.5; 3/5 | 8.4 |
| Sigma Dos/El Mundo | 30 Sep–2 Oct | 1,000 | ? | 28.9; 127 | 21.2; 98 | 10.1; 24 | 12.2; 32 | 9.2; 22 | 3.8; 15 | 1.8; 7 | 1.7; 7 | – | | – | – | – | 4.6; 10 | – | 7.7 |
| ElectoPanel/Electomanía | 28 Sep–1 Oct | 1,200 | ? | 26.0; 118 | 22.4; 105 | 10.5; 29 | 12.3; 28 | 8.7; 20 | 4.0; 15 | 1.6; 6 | 1.6; 6 | 1.0; 4 | | 0.6; 2 | 0.4; 2 | 0.3; 1 | 6.2; 12 | 0.7; 1 | 3.6 |
| GAD3/ABC | 27–29 Sep | ? | 70 | 27.8; 124 | 21.4; 97 | 11.5; 32 | 11.7; 31 | 9.5; 21 | 4.0; 16 | 1.9; 7 | 1.5; 6 | 1.0; 3 | | 0.3; 1 | 0.5; 2 | 0.2; 1 | 5.1; 9 | – | 6.4 |
| ElectoPanel/Electomanía | 22–27 Sep | 3,000 | ? | 25.2; 109 | 21.7; 103 | 11.3; 35 | 11.6; 31 | 8.7; 19 | 4.2; 16 | 1.8; 7 | 1.5; 6 | 0.9; 4 | | 0.7; 3 | 0.4; 2 | 0.2; 1 | 7.7; 14 | – | 3.5 |
| Sondaxe/La Voz de Galicia | 23–26 Sep | 1,001 | ? | 26.1; 119 | 19.1; 87 | 10.3; 27 | 12.1; 41 | 10.1; 21 | ? 14 | ? 7 | 1.3; 6 | ? 4 | | ? 1 | ? 2 | ? 1 | 6.4; 19 | – | 7.0 |
| GAD3/ABC | 23–25 Sep | 1,207 | ? | 27.2; 121 | 21.4; 97 | 11.3; 32 | 12.4; 34 | 9.6; 21 | 3.9; 15 | 2.0; 7 | 1.6; 6 | 1.0; 4 | | 0.4; 1 | 0.5; 2 | 0.2; 1 | 5.2; 9 | – | 5.8 |
| Celeste-Tel/eldiario.es | 19–23 Sep | 1,100 | 65.6 | 29.4; 126 | 22.1; 95 | 13.4; 42 | 14.1; 37 | 7.0; 12 | 4.2; 16 | 1.7; 6 | 1.6; 6 | 1.1; 4 | 0.7; 1 | 0.6; 2 | 0.5; 2 | 0.2; 1 | – | – | 7.3 |
| NC Report/La Razón | 18–21 Sep | 1,000 | 65.0 | 28.6; 124/127 | 22.0; 89/92 | 13.7; 47/49 | 13.6; 35/37 | 7.5; 14/16 | – | – | – | – | – | – | – | – | – | – | 6.6 |
| Ipsos/Henneo | 18–20 Sep | 1,837 | 69.5 | 28.0; 117/121 | 19.8; 79/83 | 14.2; 49/52 | 15.2; 41/45 | 9.8; 20/23 | 3.7; 13/15 | 1.7; 6/7 | 1.5; 6 | – | – | – | – | – | – | – | 8.2 |
| SocioMétrica/El Español | 18–20 Sep | 1,000 | ? | 28.6; 126 | 19.4; 85 | 11.9; 36 | 14.5; 39 | 10.0; 24 | 4.2; 16 | 1.8; 7 | 1.6; 7 | 1.2; 5 | 0.8; 1 | 0.6; 1 | 0.3; 2 | 0.3; 1 | – | – | 9.2 |
| 40dB/El País | 18–20 Sep | 1,544 | 62.8 | 30.3; 132 | 23.5; 94 | 13.3; 34 | 14.0; 38 | 8.6; 18 | ? 14 | ? 6 | ? 7 | ? 2 | ? 1 | ? 1 | ? 2 | ? 1 | – | – | 6.8 |
| GAD3/La Vanguardia | 16–20 Sep | 1,006 | 69.0 | 31.6; 134 | 20.3; 87 | 13.1; 41 | 13.4; 37 | 9.6; 19 | 3.4; 13 | 1.7; 7 | 1.3; 6 | 1.0; 3 | ? 1 | ? 1 | (Note: Within PP.) | ? 1 | – | – | 11.3 |
| InvyMark/laSexta | 16–20 Sep | ? | ? | 33.4 | 20.2 | 12.1 | 12.5 | 6.8 | – | – | – | – | – | – | – | – | – | – | 13.2 |
| ElectoPanel/Electomanía | 17–18 Sep | 1,000 | 64.7 | 27.7; 115 | 21.0; 93 | 13.0; 45 | 13.8; 38 | 9.6; 20 | 4.4; 16 | 1.8; 7 | 1.6; 7 | 1.0; 4 | 0.8; 1 | 0.5; 1 | 0.4; 2 | 0.2; 1 | – | – | 6.7 |
| CIS (SocioMétrica) | 1–18 Sep | 5,906 | ? | 29.4 | 19.9 | 13.3 | 15.4 | 9.7 | 3.8 | 1.9 | 1.6 | 1.1 | 0.5 | 0.3 | 0.3 | 0.1 | – | – | 9.5 |
| CIS (Gravitas) | 1–18 Sep | 5,906 | 68.0 | 29.3; 121/131 | 16.8; 66/72 | 13.2; 41/46 | 16.0; 43/50 | 10.4; 25/30 | – | – | – | – | – | – | 0.5; 2 | – | – | – | 12.5 |
| CIS | 1–18 Sep | 5,906 | ? | 34.2 | 17.1 | 12.9 | 15.5 | 7.5 | 3.7 | 2.0 | 1.6 | 1.2 | 0.6 | 0.2 | 0.1 | 0.1 | – | – | 17.1 |
| ElectoPanel/Electomanía | 10–15 Sep | 1,200 | 64.7 | 28.4; 121 | 20.8; 93 | 12.7; 39 | 13.5; 36 | 9.7; 20 | 4.5; 16 | 2.1; 8 | 1.7; 7 | 1.0; 4 | 0.9; 1 | 0.5; 1 | 0.4; 2 | 0.3; 1 | – | – | 7.6 |
| Demoscopia Servicios/ESdiario | 12–14 Sep | ? | 71.3 | 31.8; 140 | 20.6; 86 | 14.0; 46 | 12.7; 31 | 7.0; 11 | – | – | – | – | – | – | – | – | – | – | 11.2 |
| InvyMark/laSexta | 9–13 Sep | ? | ? | 33.9 | 20.0 | 11.7 | 12.3 | 7.0 | – | – | – | – | – | – | – | – | – | – | 13.9 |
| DYM/El Independiente | 9–12 Sep | 1,001 | ? | 29.8; 125/130 | 18.4; 75/80 | 13.3; 35/40 | 14.6; 40/45 | 10.2; 20/25 | – | – | – | – | – | – | – | – | – | – | 11.4 |
| KeyData/Público | 6 Sep | ? | 72.1 | 31.2; 135 | 19.3; 83 | 13.6; 45 | 13.7; 36 | 8.4; 16 | 3.9; 15 | 1.5; 6 | 1.5; 6 | 1.0; 3 | ? 1 | 0.5; 1 | ? 2 | ? 0 | – | – | 11.9 |
| Simple Lógica | 2–6 Sep | 1,089 | 68.3 | 30.6 | 18.4 | 13.6 | 13.8 | 12.1 | – | – | – | – | – | – | – | – | – | – | 12.2 |
| GAD3/ABC | 2–6 Sep | 1,000 | 70 | 32.1; 137 | 19.9; 82 | 14.0; 45 | 13.3; 35 | 7.9; 14 | 3.8; 15 | 1.9; 7 | 1.4; 7 | 1.0; 3 | – | – | 0.4; 2 | – | – | – | 12.2 |
| InvyMark/laSexta | 2–6 Sep | ? | ? | 34.4 | 20.1 | 11.5 | 12.2 | 6.7 | – | – | – | – | – | – | – | – | – | – | 14.3 |
| Celeste-Tel/eldiario.es | 2–5 Sep | 1,100 | 65.9 | 30.5; 128 | 20.1; 85 | 14.1; 49 | 13.7; 36 | 8.0; 13 | 4.3; 16 | 1.7; 6 | 1.6; 6 | 1.0; 4 | 0.5; 1 | 0.6; 2 | 0.6; 3 | 0.2; 1 | – | – | 10.4 |
| SocioMétrica/El Español | 27–30 Aug | 1,100 | ? | 31.3; 139 | 18.1; 76 | 12.2; 38 | 13.9; 37 | 9.7; 22 | 4.1; 15 | 1.8; 7 | 1.6; 6 | 1.1; 5 | 0.8; 1 | 0.4; 1 | 0.4; 2 | 0.2; 1 | – | – | 13.2 |
| Sigma Dos/El Mundo | 27–29 Aug | 1,000 | ? | 33.4; 145 | 19.0; 78 | 11.8; 34 | 14.2; 40 | 8.3; 17 | 4.3; 18 | 1.1; 3 | 1.5; 6 | – | – | – | – | – | – | – | 14.4 |
| NC Report/La Razón | 20–24 Aug | 1,000 | 66.6 | 29.5; 127/130 | 21.9; 84/87 | 13.9; 49/52 | 13.1; 33/36 | 7.7; 15/17 | 3.6; 14/15 | 1.8; 6 | 1.5; 6 | 1.1; 4 | 0.5; 1 | 0.6; 2 | 0.5; 2 | 0.2; 1 | – | – | 7.6 |
| ElectoPanel/Electomanía | 1–15 Aug | 2,500 | 64.1 | 29.3; 126 | 21.0; 92 | 12.5; 38 | 13.2; 36 | 9.0; 18 | 4.5; 16 | 2.0; 7 | 1.6; 7 | 1.1; 4 | 0.9; 1 | 0.6; 1 | 0.4; 2 | 0.3; 1 | – | – | 8.3 |
| NC Report/La Razón | 11 Aug | ? | 67.6 | 29.7; 126/130 | 21.8; 82/86 | 14.1; 50/53 | 12.9; 31/34 | 7.8; 17/20 | 3.5; 14/15 | 2.0; 7 | 1.5; 6 | 1.2; 4 | 0.4; 1 | 0.7; 2 | 0.6; 2 | 0.2; 1 | – | – | 7.9 |
| Celeste-Tel/eldiario.es | 1–7 Aug | 1,100 | 67.0 | 30.9; 129 | 20.2; 83 | 14.3; 52 | 13.4; 36 | 8.3; 17 | 3.7; 14 | 1.8; 6 | 1.5; 5 | 0.9; 3 | 0.4; 1 | 0.6; 2 | 0.5; 2 | 0.2; 0 | – | – | 10.7 |
| KeyData/Público | 5 Aug | ? | 72.7 | 31.5; 135 | 18.7; 75 | 14.4; 52 | 13.4; 39 | 7.6; 14 | ? 15 | ? 6 | ? 6 | ? 3 | ? 1 | ? 1 | ? 2 | ? 1 | – | – | 12.8 |
| Simple Lógica | 1–5 Aug | 1,074 | 68.0 | 31.4 | 17.2 | 14.9 | 13.8 | 11.0 | – | – | – | – | – | – | – | – | – | – | 14.2 |
| InvyMark/laSexta | 29 Jul–1 Aug | ? | ? | 36.1 | 17.0 | 12.6 | 12.3 | 6.5 | – | – | – | – | – | – | – | – | – | – | 19.1 |
| SocioMétrica/El Español | 25–26 Jul | 1,000 | ? | 29.3; 125 | 18.2; 77 | 16.2; 57 | 14.3; 42 | 8.7; 20 | – | – | – | – | – | – | – | – | – | – | 11.1 |
| ElectoPanel/Electomanía | 24–26 Jul | 1,200 | 64.2 | 29.2; 128 | 20.8; 93 | 12.3; 37 | 13.2; 39 | 9.5; 19 | ? 16 | ? 7 | ? 6 | ? 3 | ? 1 | ? 1 | ? 2 | ? 1 | – | – | 8.4 |
| ElectoPanel/Electomanía | 23 Jul | ? | ? | 32.2; 140 | 19.8; 86 | 11.6; 32 | 13.9; 39 | 8.8; 17 | ? 15 | ? 7 | ? 6 | ? 3 | ? 1 | ? 1 | ? 2 | ? 1 | – | – | 12.4 |
| ElectoPanel/Electomanía | 21 Jul | ? | ? | 31.9; 137 | 20.3; 92 | 11.7; 33 | 13.8; 36 | 9.1; 17 | ? 15 | ? 7 | ? 6 | ? 2 | ? 1 | ? 1 | ? 2 | ? 1 | – | – | 11.6 |
| InvyMark/laSexta | 15–19 Jul | ? | ? | 36.7 | 16.1 | 12.9 | 12.5 | 7.3 | – | – | – | – | – | – | – | – | – | – | 20.6 |
| Metroscopia/Henneo | 11–12 Jul | 1,251 | ? | 31.0 | 19.0 | 13.0 | 13.0 | 8.0 | – | – | – | – | – | – | – | – | – | – | 12.0 |
| CIS (El Mundo) (Note: Alternative projection based on raw CIS data.) | 1–11 Jul | 2,952 | ? | 32.6 | 15.7 | 15.3 | 15.0 | 8.1 | – | – | – | – | – | – | – | – | – | – | 16.9 |
| Simple Lógica | 1–9 Jul | 1,037 | 70.2 | 32.7 | 17.9 | 13.1 | 15.2 | 9.3 | – | – | – | – | – | – | – | – | – | – | 14.8 |
| KeyData/Público | 7 Jul | ? | 72.1 | 31.2; 134 | 17.4; 71 | 16.6; 63 | 13.1; 35 | 7.6; 14 | 3.9; 14 | 1.5; 5 | 1.3; 6 | 1.1; 3 | ? 1 | 0.4; 1 | ? 2 | ? 1 | – | – | 13.8 |
| InvyMark/laSexta | 3–6 Jul | 1,200 | ? | 36.6 | 15.5 | 13.2 | 12.9 | 7.6 | – | – | – | – | – | – | – | – | – | – | 21.1 |
| Demoscopia Servicios/ESdiario | 2–5 Jul | ? | 72.4 | 31.3; 142 | 21.5; 87 | 16.2; 47 | 11.2; 29 | 7.7; 12 | ? 13 | – | – | – | – | – | – | – | – | – | 9.8 |
| Celeste-Tel/eldiario.es | 1–5 Jul | 1,100 | 67.6 | 31.2; 131 | 19.9; 79 | 14.4; 52 | 13.2; 37 | 8.4; 18 | 3.8; 14 | 1.8; 6 | 1.5; 5 | 0.9; 3 | 0.4; 1 | 0.6; 2 | 0.5; 2 | 0.2; 0 | – | – | 11.3 |
| ElectoPanel/Electomanía | 22–25 Jun | 8,800 | ? | 32.1; 138 | 20.2; 89 | 12.5; 37 | 12.2; 32 | 9.0; 18 | ? 15 | ? 7 | ? 6 | ? 3 | ? 1 | ? 1 | ? 2 | ? 1 | – | – | 11.9 |
| Sigma Dos/El Mundo | 21 Jun | 1,000 | ? | 32.6 | 19.4 | 13.1 | 13.2 | 8.0 | 4.2 | 1.7 | 1.5 | – | – | – | – | – | – | – | 13.2 |
| GAD3/ABC | 17–21 Jun | 800 | 70 | 30.8; 130 | 20.6; 85 | 16.2; 58 | 13.0; 34 | 5.6; 9 | – | – | – | – | – | – | – | – | – | – | 10.2 |
| InvyMark/laSexta | 17–21 Jun | ? | ? | 35.9 | 15.1 | 14.0 | 12.9 | 8.1 | – | – | – | – | – | – | – | – | – | – | 20.8 |
| NC Report/La Razón | 7–13 Jun | 1,000 | 68.8 | 30.5; 130/132 | 20.2; 77/80 | 14.9; 53/57 | 12.7; 29/32 | 8.0; 19/21 | 3.6; 14/15 | 1.9; 7 | 1.6; 6 | 1.1; 4 | 0.4; 1 | 0.7; 2 | 0.6; 2 | 0.2; 1 | – | – | 10.3 |
| Celeste-Tel/eldiario.es | 5–11 Jun | 1,100 | 68.1 | 30.6; 128 | 19.4; 76 | 14.6; 53 | 13.2; 38 | 8.7; 20 | 3.9; 14 | 1.9; 6 | 1.5; 6 | 1.0; 4 | 0.4; 1 | 0.7; 2 | 0.5; 2 | 0.2; 0 | – | – | 11.2 |
| Simple Lógica | 3–11 Jun | 1,090 | 75.9 | 32.0 | 15.7 | 19.7 | 13.4 | 8.9 | – | – | – | – | – | – | – | – | – | – | 12.3 |
| CIS (El Mundo) | 1–11 Jun | 2,974 | ? | 30.4 | 14.2 | 15.1 | 12.2 | 8.2 | – | – | – | – | – | – | – | – | – | – | 15.3 |
| Demoscopia Servicios/ESdiario | 4–7 Jun | 1,000 | ? | 30.4; 134 | 21.1; 84 | 17.6; 63 | 10.8; 24 | 7.9; 13 | ? 13 | – | – | – | – | – | – | – | – | – | 9.3 |
| InvyMark/laSexta | 27–31 May | ? | ? | 33.6 | 15.4 | 15.1 | 13.3 | 8.4 | – | – | – | – | – | – | – | – | – | – | 18.2 |
| 2019 EP election | 26 May | —N/a | 60.7 | 32.9 (152) | 20.2 (82) | 12.2 (32) | 10.1 (25) | 6.2 (10) | 3.4 (11) | 4.4 (17) | 1.7 (9) | 1.3 (5) | 0.9 (2) | 0.8 (3) | – | – | – | – | 12.7 |
| Simple Lógica | 6–14 May | 1,058 | 75.6 | 33.7 | 18.6 | 21.7 | 14.8 | 3.2 | – | – | – | – | – | – | – | – | – | – | 12.0 |
| April 2019 general election | 28 Apr | —N/a | 71.8 | 28.7; 123 | 16.7; 66 | 15.9; 57 | 14.3; 42 | 10.3; 24 | 3.9; 15 | 1.9; 7 | 1.5; 6 | 1.0; 4 | 0.7; 1 | 0.5; 2 | 0.4; 2 | 0.2; 1 | – | – | 12.0 |

==== Voting preferences ====
The table below lists raw, unweighted voting preferences.

Color key:

Poll conducted after legal ban on opinion polls

| Polling firm/Commissioner | Fieldwork date | Sample size | PSOE | PP | Cs | Unidas Podemos | Vox | ERC–Sobiranistes | JxCat | PNV | EH Bildu | Compromís | CC–NCa | NA+ | PRC | Más País | CUP | Question | X mark | Lead |
|---|---|---|---|---|---|---|---|---|---|---|---|---|---|---|---|---|---|---|---|---|
| November 2019 general election (Note: Does not include non-resident citizens.) | 10 Nov | —N/a | 19.4 | 14.4 | 4.7 | 8.9 | 10.4 | 2.5 | 1.5 | 1.1 | 0.8 | | 0.4 | 0.3 | 0.2 | 1.7 | 0.7 | —N/a | 30.1 | 5.0 |
| GESOP/El Periòdic | 7–9 Nov | 903 | 20.7 | 13.3 | 4.0 | 11.6 | 11.1 | 3.5 | 0.8 | – | – | | – | – | – | 2.0 | 0.8 | 28.0 | | 7.4 |
| CIS | 4–9 Nov | 2,427 | 23.8 | 10.7 | 4.6 | 10.2 | 7.8 | 3.0 | 1.1 | 1.3 | 0.5 | | 0.4 | 0.2 | 0.2 | 1.6 | 1.1 | 21.9 | 8.4 | 13.1 |
| GESOP/El Periòdic | 6–8 Nov | 903 | 21.0 | 12.5 | 3.4 | 11.6 | 11.4 | 2.9 | 0.7 | – | – | | – | – | – | 1.9 | 1.5 | 29.1 | | 8.5 |
| GESOP/El Periòdic | 5–7 Nov | 904 | 19.4 | 12.6 | 2.5 | 9.3 | 11.8 | 2.5 | 0.6 | – | – | | – | – | – | 1.7 | 1.6 | 33.4 | | 6.8 |
| GESOP/El Periòdic | 4–6 Nov | 905 | 20.3 | 11.4 | 2.9 | 9.2 | 11.6 | 3.1 | 0.5 | – | – | | – | – | – | 1.8 | 1.4 | 33.1 | | 8.7 |
| GESOP/El Periòdic | 3–5 Nov | 904 | 21.7 | 10.1 | 3.0 | 8.5 | 12.4 | 3.3 | 0.8 | – | – | | – | – | – | 2.2 | 1.0 | 31.9 | | 9.3 |
| GESOP/El Periòdic | 31 Oct–4 Nov | 861 | 22.5 | 10.6 | 3.6 | 9.4 | 11.9 | 3.4 | 0.6 | – | – | | – | – | – | 2.1 | 1.2 | 29.8 | | 10.6 |
| CIS | 28 Oct–3 Nov | 2,378 | 21.9 | 12.4 | 5.4 | 8.5 | 6.8 | 3.1 | 1.0 | 1.0 | 0.8 | | 0.2 | 0.2 | 0.1 | 1.8 | 0.5 | 23.4 | 9.7 | 9.5 |
| SocioMétrica/El Español | 31 Oct–2 Nov | 1,100 | 16.9 | 12.5 | 5.4 | 10.6 | 11.0 | – | – | – | – | | – | – | – | 2.5 | – | 31.0 | | 4.4 |
| SW Demoscopia/infoLibre | 28 Oct–2 Nov | 1,517 | 25.9 | 15.0 | 4.4 | 8.1 | 8.4 | – | – | – | – | | – | – | – | 3.3 | – | – | – | 10.9 |
| GESOP/El Periódico | 28–31 Oct | 1,504 | 21.6 | 11.3 | 4.1 | 10.3 | 8.9 | 2.5 | 0.9 | – | – | | – | – | – | 1.7 | 1.1 | 23.6 | 9.8 | 10.3 |
| DYM/Prensa Ibérica | 25–30 Oct | 1,005 | 18.8 | 11.0 | 6.2 | 6.5 | 9.0 | – | – | – | – | | – | – | – | 2.1 | – | 28.0 | 8.1 | 7.8 |
| 40dB/El País | 23–29 Oct | 2,002 | 17.5 | 8.5 | 6.6 | 11.5 | 10.4 | 4.3 | 2.1 | 0.9 | 0.7 | | 0.5 | 0.0 | 0.2 | 3.3 | 0.9 | 20.3 | 5.0 | 6.0 |
| SocioMétrica/El Español | 24–26 Oct | 1,100 | 17.1 | 14.0 | 6.0 | 8.6 | 7.9 | – | – | – | – | | – | – | – | 3.6 | – | 35.6 | | 3.1 |
| CIS | 21 Sep–13 Oct | 17,650 | 19.9 | 9.1 | 4.2 | 7.4 | 4.0 | 2.5 | 0.8 | 0.9 | 0.9 | | 0.2 | 0.2 | 0.1 | 1.3 | 0.3 | 32.7 | 11.8 | 10.8 |
| SocioMétrica/El Español | 9–12 Oct | 1,000 | 18.7 | 14.3 | 6.0 | 9.4 | 7.2 | – | – | – | – | | – | – | – | 3.6 | – | 30.5 | | 4.4 |
| Simple Lógica | 1–4 Oct | 1,046 | 17.0 | 8.6 | 5.0 | 8.7 | 5.6 | – | – | – | – | | – | – | – | 3.2 | – | 24.1 | 19.1 | 8.3 |
| SocioMétrica/El Español | 1–4 Oct | 1,000 | 18.0 | 13.9 | 7.5 | 9.4 | 8.4 | 2.3 | 1.2 | 0.8 | 0.7 | | 0.1 | 0.1 | 0.2 | 4.3 | 0.8 | 12.9 | 16.1 | 4.1 |
| GESOP/El Periódico | 30 Sep–3 Oct | 1,005 | 18.6 | 12.3 | 6.1 | 9.2 | 6.5 | 2.7 | 0.9 | – | – | | – | – | – | 2.6 | 1.1 | 26.1 | 7.9 | 6.3 |
| SocioMétrica/El Español | 18–20 Sep | 1,000 | 18.2 | 13.9 | 8.0 | 12.0 | 9.0 | 3.1 | 1.4 | 1.1 | 0.9 | 0.7 | 0.5 | 0.1 | 0.2 | – | – | 11.8 | 13.5 | 4.3 |
| 40dB/El País | 18–20 Sep | 1,544 | 22.8 | 9.6 | 8.1 | 12.1 | 8.4 | 3.2 | 1.4 | 0.8 | 1.1 | 0.4 | 1.0 | 0.4 | – | – | – | 16.4 | 5.3 | 10.7 |
| GAD3/La Vanguardia | 16–20 Sep | 1,006 | 28.9 | 15.6 | 9.3 | 9.0 | 6.5 | 2.6 | 0.9 | 0.8 | 0.5 | – | – | – | – | – | – | – | – | 13.3 |
| CIS | 1–18 Sep | 5,906 | 27.0 | 10.2 | 7.9 | 10.7 | 4.5 | 3.0 | 1.4 | 1.0 | 1.0 | 0.4 | 0.1 | 0.2 | 0.1 | – | – | 15.2 | 12.4 | 16.3 |
| DYM/El Independiente | 9–12 Sep | 1,001 | 20.9 | 7.9 | 8.1 | 11.9 | 5.2 | – | – | – | – | – | – | – | – | – | – | 17.8 | – | 9.0 |
| Simple Lógica | 2–6 Sep | 1,089 | 21.3 | 9.8 | 6.4 | 9.5 | 6.0 | – | – | – | – | – | – | – | – | – | – | 18.5 | 21.1 | 11.5 |
| SocioMétrica/El Español | 27–30 Aug | 1,100 | 23.5 | 13.5 | 8.0 | 10.9 | 8.4 | 3.5 | 1.3 | 1.2 | 0.9 | 0.6 | 0.3 | 0.0 | 0.2 | – | – | 11.0 | 13.1 | 10.0 |
| Simple Lógica | 1–5 Aug | 1,074 | 24.7 | 8.5 | 7.7 | 9.1 | 5.0 | – | – | – | – | – | – | – | – | – | – | 18.4 | 18.8 | 15.6 |
| CIS | 17 Jun–16 Jul | 9,191 | 29.7 | 11.6 | 7.4 | 8.9 | 3.3 | 3.0 | 1.0 | 1.0 | 1.3 | 0.5 | 0.2 | 0.2 | 0.1 | – | – | 18.8 | 9.8 | 18.1 |
| CIS | 1–11 Jul | 2,952 | 30.5 | 10.1 | 9.1 | 9.6 | 3.4 | 3.3 | 1.2 | 1.0 | 0.8 | 0.2 | 0.0 | 0.2 | 0.1 | – | – | 16.2 | 10.0 | 20.4 |
| Simple Lógica | 1–9 Jul | 1,037 | 28.4 | 8.5 | 6.9 | 10.9 | 3.7 | – | – | – | – | – | – | – | – | – | – | 16.6 | 16.0 | 17.5 |
| Simple Lógica | 3–11 Jun | 1,090 | 26.8 | 9.0 | 11.6 | 9.3 | 4.8 | – | – | – | – | – | – | – | – | – | – | 15.3 | 13.2 | 15.2 |
| CIS | 1–11 Jun | 2,974 | 30.7 | 10.7 | 12.3 | 9.7 | 4.0 | 3.1 | 0.9 | 1.1 | 0.6 | 0.5 | 0.1 | 0.2 | 0.0 | – | – | 12.5 | 9.7 | 18.4 |
| 2019 EP election | 26 May 2019 | —N/a | 20.9 | 12.8 | 7.8 | 6.4 | 4.0 | 2.2 | 2.8 | 1.1 | 0.9 | 0.6 | 0.5 | – | – | – | – | —N/a | 35.8 | 8.1 |
| Simple Lógica | 6–14 May | 1,058 | 23.8 | 7.9 | 11.5 | 13.8 | 4.2 | – | – | – | – | – | – | – | – | – | – | 19.0 | 9.5 | 10.0 |
| CIS | 1–11 May | 2,985 | 30.1 | 9.4 | 13.4 | 12.6 | 4.4 | 3.3 | 1.0 | 1.0 | 0.9 | 0.6 | 0.4 | 0.4 | 0.1 | – | – | 10.3 | 7.5 | 16.7 |
| April 2019 general election | 28 Apr | —N/a | 21.5 | 12.5 | 11.9 | 10.7 | 7.7 | 2.9 | 1.4 | 1.1 | 0.7 | 0.5 | 0.4 | 0.3 | 0.1 | – | – | —N/a | 24.2 | 9.0 |

==== Victory preferences ====
The table below lists opinion polling on the victory preferences for each party in the event of a general election taking place.

| Polling firm/Commissioner | Fieldwork date | Sample size | PSOE | PP | Cs | Unidas Podemos | Vox | Más País | Other/ None | Question | Lead |
|---|---|---|---|---|---|---|---|---|---|---|---|
| CIS | 21 Sep–13 Oct | 17,650 | 28.5 | 12.6 | 6.7 | 10.9 | 4.1 | 2.0 | 15.4 | 19.6 | 15.9 |

==== Victory likelihood ====
The table below lists opinion polling on the perceived likelihood of victory for each party in the event of a general election taking place.

| Polling firm/Commissioner | Fieldwork date | Sample size | PSOE | PP | Cs | Unidas Podemos | Vox | Más País | Other/ None | Question | Lead |
|---|---|---|---|---|---|---|---|---|---|---|---|
| SW Demoscopia/infoLibre | 28 Oct–2 Nov | 1,517 | 83.7 | 11.5 | 0.7 | 0.9 | 2.3 | 0.1 | – | – | 72.2 |
| CIS | 21 Sep–13 Oct | 17,650 | 64.6 | 6.1 | 0.5 | 0.4 | 0.1 | 0.0 | 3.7 | 24.7 | 58.5 |

==== Senate projections ====
| Polling firm/Commissioner | Fieldwork date | Sample size | PSOE | PP | Cs | Unidas Podemos | Vox | ERC–Sobiranistes | JxCat | PNV | NA+ | EH Bildu | CC–NCa | ASG | E+ |
|---|---|---|---|---|---|---|---|---|---|---|---|---|---|---|---|
| November 2019 general election | 10 Nov | —N/a | 93 | 83 | 0 | 0 | 2 | 11 | 3 | 9 | 3 | 1 | 0 | 1 | – |
| Demoscopia Servicios/ESdiario | 7 Nov | ? | 79 | 102 | 0 | 0 | 0 | 12 | 1 | 9 | 3 | 1 | 1 | 0 | – |
| KeyData/Público | 27 Oct | ? | 96 | 85 | 0 | 0 | 0 | 11 | 2 | 9 | ? | ? | ? | ? | – |
| NC Report/La Razón | 18–21 Sep | 1,000 | 78 | 103 | 0 | 0 | 0 | 11 | 2 | 9 | 3 | 1 | ? | 1 | – |
| SocioMétrica/El Español | 27–30 Aug | 1,100 | 88/92 | (Note: Within E+.) | | 0 | | 9/11 | 2 | 6/8 | | 1 | ? | 1 | 94/100 |
| SocioMétrica/El Español | 27–30 Aug | 1,100 | 126/132 | 53/57 | 0 | 0 | 0 | 9/11 | 2 | 6/8 | 3 | 1 | ? | 1 | – |
| April 2019 general election | 28 Apr | —N/a | 123 | 54 | 4 | 0 | 0 | 11 | 2 | 9 | 3 | 1 | 0 | 1 | – |

=== Hypothetical scenarios ===
==== Errejón's party ====
| Polling firm/Commissioner | Fieldwork date | Sample size | Turnout | PSOE | PP | Cs | Unidas Podemos | Vox | ERC–Sobiranistes | JxCat | PNV | EH Bildu | Compromís | CC–NCa | NA+ | PRC | Errejón's party | Lead |
|---|---|---|---|---|---|---|---|---|---|---|---|---|---|---|---|---|---|---|
| SocioMétrica/El Español | 18–20 Sep | 1,000 | ? | 27.0; 120/125 | 19.7; 90/92 | 12.1; 38/41 | 11.1; 26/30 | 10.2; 23/26 | 4.1; 13/15 | 1.8; 6/7 | 1.5; 6/7 | 1.2; 4/5 | 0.9; 1 | 0.5; 1/2 | 0.3; 1/2 | 0.3; 1 | 5.8; 6/10 | 7.3 |
| ElectoPanel/Electomanía | 17–18 Sep | 1,000 | ? | 27.3; 114 | 21.0; 93 | 12.8; 43 | 13.2; 37 | 9.6; 21 | 4.4; 16 | 1.8; 7 | 1.6; 7 | 1.0; 4 | 0.8; 1 | 0.5; 1 | 0.4; 2 | 0.2; 1 | 1.2 (Note: In Madrid only.); 3 | 6.3 |
| ElectoPanel/Electomanía | 17–18 Sep | 1,000 | ? | 24.3; 102 | 20.4; 98 | 12.2; 44 | 12.0; 32 | 9.4; 22 | 4.2; 15 | 1.8; 7 | 1.5; 6 | 1.0; 4 | 0.8; 1 | 0.4; 1 | 0.4; 2 | 0.2; 1 | 7.6; 15 | 3.9 |
| ElectoPanel/Electomanía | 10–15 Sep | 1,200 | ? | 27.9; 119 | 20.8; 93 | 12.5; 39 | 13.2; 34 | 9.7; 20 | 4.5; 16 | 2.1; 8 | 1.7; 7 | 1.0; 4 | 0.9; 1 | 0.5; 1 | 0.4; 2 | 0.3; 1 | 1.6; 4 | 7.1 |
| ElectoPanel/Electomanía | 10–15 Sep | 1,200 | 65.9 | 24.9; 105 | 20.2; 95 | 11.8; 39 | 11.3; 30 | 9.5; 23 | 4.4; 16 | 2.1; 7 | 1.7; 7 | 1.0; 5 | 0.8; 1 | 0.6; 2 | 0.4; 2 | 0.3; 1 | 8.3; 16 | 4.7 |
| ElectoPanel/Electomanía | 1–15 Aug | 2,500 | 65.2 | 25.7; 117 | 20.4; 95 | 11.6; 36 | 9.5; 20 | 8.9; 21 | 4.4; 16 | 2.1; 7 | 1.6; 7 | 1.1; 5 | 0.8; 1 | 0.6; 2 | 0.4; 2 | 0.2; 1 | 9.8; 20 | 5.3 |
| ElectoPanel/Electomanía | 24–26 Jul | 1,200 | 66.0 | 26.2; 119 | 20.2; 94 | 11.3; 35 | 9.5; 21 | 9.3; 24 | ? 14 | ? 7 | ? 6 | ? 5 | ? 1 | ? 1 | ? 2 | ? 1 | 9.3; 20 | 6.0 |
| ElectoPanel/Electomanía | 21 Jul | ? | ? | 28.6; 129 | 20.1; 96 | 11.2; 33 | 9.7; 22 | 8.9; 17 | ? 15 | ? 7 | ? 7 | ? 2 | ? 1 | ? 1 | ? 2 | ? 1 | 8.8; 17 | 8.5 |

==== España Suma ====
| Polling firm/Commissioner | Fieldwork date | Sample size | Turnout | PSOE | E+ | Cs | Unidas Podemos | Vox | ERC–Sobiranistes | JxCat | PNV | EH Bildu | Compromís | CC–NCa | NA+ | PRC | Lead |
|---|---|---|---|---|---|---|---|---|---|---|---|---|---|---|---|---|---|
| SocioMétrica/El Español | 27–30 Aug | 1,100 | ? | 36.2; 142 | 32.1; 131 | | 16.0; 38 | | 4.2; 16 | 1.9; 7 | 1.7; 6 | 1.2; 4 | 0.9; 2 | 0.5; 1 | 0.5; 2 | 0.3; 1 | 4.1 |
| SocioMétrica/El Español | 27–30 Aug | 1,100 | ? | 33.2; 136 | 23.1; 97 | 14.0; 41 | 14.4; 37 | | 4.2; 16 | 1.9; 7 | 1.7; 6 | 1.2; 4 | 0.9; 2 | 0.5; 1 | 0.3; 2 | 0.2; 1 | 10.1 |
| SocioMétrica/El Español | 27–30 Aug | 1,100 | ? | 34.9; 143 | 23.3; 98 | | 15.0; 40 | 11.3; 30 | 4.2; 16 | 1.8; 7 | 1.7; 6 | 1.2; 4 | 0.9; 2 | 0.5; 1 | 0.4; 2 | 0.2; 1 | 11.6 |
| ElectoPanel/Electomanía | 1–15 Aug | 2,500 | 69.4 | 34.6; 136 | 33.5; 139 | | 11.3; 29 | 7.0; 11 | 4.3; 15 | 1.8; 7 | 1.6; 6 | 1.1; 4 | 0.7; 1 | 0.6; 1 | | 0.2; 1 | 1.1 |
| ElectoPanel/Electomanía | 21 Jul | ? | ? | 34.5; 131 | 36.5; 151 | | 10.8; 26 | 6.2; 9 | ? 15 | ? 8 | ? 6 | ? 2 | ? 1 | ? 1 | | ? 0 | 2.0 |

==== España Suma & Errejón's party ====
| Polling firm/Commissioner | Fieldwork date | Sample size | Turnout | PSOE | E+ | Unidas Podemos | Vox | ERC–Sobiranistes | JxCat | PNV | EH Bildu | Compromís | CC–NCa | PRC | Errejón's party | Lead |
|---|---|---|---|---|---|---|---|---|---|---|---|---|---|---|---|---|
| ElectoPanel/Electomanía | 21 Jul | ? | ? | 29.7; 121 | 36.3; 156 | 8.5; 17 | 6.1; 8 | ? 15 | ? 8 | ? 6 | ? 2 | ? 1 | ? 1 | ? 1 | 7.1; 14 | 6.6 |

==== PSOE+Errejón's party & España Suma ====
| Polling firm/Commissioner | Fieldwork date | Sample size | Turnout | PSOE Errejón's party | E+ | Unidas Podemos | Vox | ERC–Sobiranistes | JxCat | PNV | EH Bildu | Compromís | CC–NCa | PRC | Lead |
|---|---|---|---|---|---|---|---|---|---|---|---|---|---|---|---|
| ElectoPanel/Electomanía | 21 Jul | ? | ? | 40.2; 154 | 37.2; 150 | 7.1; 11 | 4.9; 4 | ? 14 | ? 7 | ? 6 | ? 2 | ? 1 | ? 1 | ? 0 | 3.0 |
