= 1987 Canarian island council elections =

Elections in the Spanish region of the Canary Islands

Island council elections were held in the Canary Islands on 10 June 1987 to elect the 3rd Island Councils (the cabildos insulares) of El Hierro, Fuerteventura, Gran Canaria, La Gomera, La Palma, Lanzarote and Tenerife. All 137 seats in the seven island councils were up for election. They were held concurrently with regional elections in thirteen autonomous communities (including the Canary Islands) and local elections all across Spain.

== Overall ==
← Summary of the 10 June 1987 Canarian island council election results →
Parties and alliances	Popular vote			Seats	
Parties and alliances	Votes	%	±pp	Total	+/−
Spanish Socialist Workers' Party (PSOE)	196,817	29.57	−8.84	46	−5
Canarian Independent Groups (AIC)	135,486	20.36	+11.27	24	+13
Tenerife Group of Independents (ATI)	115,364	17.33	+8.84	13	+7
La Palma Group of Independents (API)	9,329	1.40	New	5	+5
Insular Group of Gran Canaria (AIGRANC)	4,970	0.75	New	0	±0
Independents of Fuerteventura (IF)	3,555	0.53	−0.07	4	−1
Lanzarote Independents Group (AIL)	2,268	0.34	New	2	+2
Democratic and Social Centre (CDS)^{1}	116,850	17.56	+10.92	30	+15
People's Alliance (AP)^{2}	78,662	11.82	−13.86	13	−21
United Canarian Left (ICU)^{3}	39,670	5.96	+1.78	5	+1
Canarian Assembly–Canarian Nationalist Left (AC–INC)^{4}	39,319	5.91	−1.29	3	−1
Centre Canarian Union (UCC)	16,590	2.49	New	1	+1
People's Democratic Party–Canarian Centrists (PDP–CC)	13,188	1.98	New	0	±0
National Congress of the Canaries (CNC)	8,326	1.25	New	0	±0
Majorera Assembly (AM)	5,606	0.84	−0.15	7	−2
Independent Herrenian Group (AHI)	2,587	0.39	+0.06	8	+2
Union of Left Nationalists (UNI)	2,049	0.31	New	0	±0
Workers' Socialist Party (PST)	1,171	0.18	New	0	±0
Popular Front of the Canary Islands–Awañac (FREPIC–Awañac)	1,092	0.16	New	0	±0
Workers' Party of Spain–Communist Unity (PTE–UC)	900	0.14	New	0	±0
Humanist Platform (PH)	702	0.11	New	0	±0
Independent Free Association of Canarian People (ALCI)	582	0.09	New	0	±0
Assembly (Tagoror)	512	0.08	−0.36	0	±0
Republican Popular Unity (UPR)	466	0.07	New	0	±0
Canarian Democratic Union (UDC)	388	0.06	New	0	±0
Unified Left of the Canarian People (IUPC)	231	0.03	New	0	±0
Gomeran People's Union (UPGO)	162	0.02	New	0	±0
Liberal Canarian Party (PCL)	n/a	n/a	−4.44	0	−3
Blank ballots	4,151	0.62	+0.12		
Total	665,507			137	±0
Valid votes	665,507	98.84	+1.13		
Invalid votes	7,833	1.16	−1.13		
Votes cast / turnout	673,340	67.18	+4.10		
Abstentions	328,932	32.82	−4.10		
Registered voters	1,002,272				
Sources
Footnotes: ^{1} Democratic and Social Centre results are compared to the combined totals of Democratic and Social Centre and Gomera Group of Independents in the 1983 elections.; ^{2} People's Alliance results are compared to People's Coalition totals in the 1983 elections.; ^{3} United Canarian Left results are compared to Communist Party of the Canaries totals in the 1983 elections.; ^{4} Canarian Assembly–Canarian Nationalist Left results are compared to Canarian People's Union–Canarian Assembly totals in the 1983 elections.

Popular vote
PSOE	29.57%
AIC	20.36%
CDS	17.56%
AP	11.82%
ICU	5.96%
AC–INC	5.91%
UCC	2.49%
PDP–CC	1.98%
CNC	1.25%
AM	0.84%
AHI	0.39%
Others	1.24%
Blank ballots	0.62%

Seats
PSOE	33.58%
CDS	21.90%
AIC	17.52%
AP	9.49%
AHI	5.84%
AM	5.11%
ICU	3.65%
AC–INC	2.19%
UCC	0.73%

== Island control ==
The following table lists party control in the island councils. Gains for a party are highlighted in that party's colour.

Island	Population	Previous control	New control
El Hierro	7,191	Independent Herrenian Group (AHI)	Independent Herrenian Group (AHI)
Fuerteventura	31,892	Majorera Assembly (AM)	Majorera Assembly (AM)
Gran Canaria	662,476	Spanish Socialist Workers' Party (PSOE)	Spanish Socialist Workers' Party (PSOE)
La Gomera	17,239	Gomera Group of Independents (AGI)	Spanish Socialist Workers' Party (PSOE)
La Palma	79,729	People's Alliance (AP)	People's Alliance (AP)
Lanzarote	56,901	Spanish Socialist Workers' Party (PSOE)	Democratic and Social Centre (CDS)
Tenerife	610,963	Spanish Socialist Workers' Party (PSOE)	Tenerife Group of Independents (ATI)

== Islands ==
=== El Hierro ===
← Summary of the 10 June 1987 Island Council of El Hierro election results →
Parties and alliances	Popular vote			Seats	
Parties and alliances	Votes	%	±pp	Total	+/−
Independent Herrenian Group (AHI)	2,587	65.05	+10.36	8	+2
Spanish Socialist Workers' Party (PSOE)	836	21.02	+1.64	2	±0
People's Alliance (AP)^{1}	334	8.40	−17.21	1	−2
Democratic and Social Centre (CDS)	203	5.10	New	0	±0
Blank ballots	17	0.43	+0.11		
Total	3,977			11	±0
Valid votes	3,977	99.62	+0.40		
Invalid votes	15	0.38	−0.40		
Votes cast / turnout	3,992	76.81	+6.42		
Abstentions	1,205	23.19	−6.42		
Registered voters	5,197				
Sources
Footnotes: ^{1} People's Alliance results are compared to People's Coalition totals in the 1983 election.

=== Fuerteventura ===
← Summary of the 10 June 1987 Island Council of Fuerteventura election results →
Parties and alliances	Popular vote			Seats	
Parties and alliances	Votes	%	±pp	Total	+/−
Majorera Assembly (AM)	5,606	36.92	−9.01	7	−2
Independents of Fuerteventura (IF)	3,555	23.41	−4.68	4	−1
Democratic and Social Centre (CDS)	3,140	20.68	+13.63	4	+3
Spanish Socialist Workers' Party (PSOE)	1,758	11.58	+1.55	2	+1
People's Alliance (AP)^{1}	699	4.60	−4.16	0	−1
Unified Left of the Canarian People (IUPC)	231	1.52	New	0	±0
Centre Canarian Union (UCC)	97	0.64	New	0	±0
Blank ballots	99	0.65	+0.51		
Total	15,185			17	±0
Valid votes	15,185	99.33	+0.79		
Invalid votes	102	0.67	−0.79		
Votes cast / turnout	15,287	74.72	+8.58		
Abstentions	5,172	25.28	−8.58		
Registered voters	20,459				
Sources
Footnotes: ^{1} People's Alliance results are compared to People's Coalition totals in the 1983 election.

=== Gran Canaria ===
← Summary of the 10 June 1987 Island Council of Gran Canaria election results →
Parties and alliances	Popular vote			Seats	
Parties and alliances	Votes	%	±pp	Total	+/−
Spanish Socialist Workers' Party (PSOE)	80,175	27.36	−9.93	9	−3
Democratic and Social Centre (CDS)	66,743	22.77	+17.55	7	+6
People's Alliance (AP)^{1}	48,757	16.64	−11.00	5	−3
Canarian Assembly–Canarian Nationalist Left (AC–INC)^{2}	28,499	9.72	−0.59	3	±0
United Canarian Left (ICU)^{3}	25,081	8.56	+3.82	2	+2
Centre Canarian Union (UCC)	16,493	5.63	New	1	+1
People's Democratic Party–Canarian Centrists (PDP–CC)	12,112	4.13	New	0	±0
Insular Group of Gran Canaria (AIGRANC)	4,970	1.70	New	0	±0
National Congress of the Canaries (CNC)	4,555	1.55	New	0	±0
Workers' Party of Spain–Communist Unity (PTE–UC)	900	0.31	New	0	±0
Humanist Platform (PH)	702	0.24	New	0	±0
Independent Free Association of Canarian People (ALCI)	582	0.20	New	0	±0
Assembly (Tagoror)	512	0.17	−0.46	0	±0
Republican Popular Unity (UPR)	466	0.16	New	0	±0
Canarian Democratic Union (UDC)	388	0.13	New	0	±0
Liberal Canarian Party (PCL)	n/a	n/a	−9.90	0	−3
Blank ballots	2,135	0.73	+0.09		
Total	293,070			27	±0
Valid votes	293,070	98.49	+1.70		
Invalid votes	4,492	1.51	−1.70		
Votes cast / turnout	297,562	65.24	+2.07		
Abstentions	158,525	34.76	−2.07		
Registered voters	456,087				
Sources
Footnotes: ^{1} People's Alliance results are compared to People's Coalition totals in the 1983 election.; ^{2} Canarian Assembly–Canarian Nationalist Left results are compared to Canarian People's Union–Canarian Assembly totals in the 1983 election.; ^{3} United Canarian Left results are compared to Communist Party of the Canaries totals in the 1983 election.

=== La Gomera ===
← Summary of the 10 June 1987 Island Council of La Gomera election results →
Parties and alliances	Popular vote			Seats	
Parties and alliances	Votes	%	±pp	Total	+/−
Spanish Socialist Workers' Party (PSOE)	4,998	56.35	+18.63	8	+3
Democratic and Social Centre–Gomera Group of Independents (CDS–AGI)^{1}	2,713	30.59	−9.21	4	−1
United Canarian Left (ICU)^{2}	566	6.38	−1.17	1	±0
People's Alliance (AP)^{3}	395	4.45	−10.22	0	−2
Gomeran People's Union (UPGO)	162	1.83	New	0	±0
Blank ballots	35	0.39	+0.13		
Total	8,869			17	±0
Valid votes	8,869	99.46	+0.31		
Invalid votes	48	0.54	−0.31		
Votes cast / turnout	8,917	71.98	+9.52		
Abstentions	3,472	28.02	−9.52		
Registered voters	12,389				
Sources
Footnotes: ^{1} Democratic and Social Centre–Gomera Group of Independents results are compared to Gomera Group of Independents totals in the 1983 election.; ^{2} United Canarian Left results are compared to Communist Party of the Canaries totals in the 1983 election.; ^{3} People's Alliance results are compared to People's Coalition totals in the 1983 election.

=== La Palma ===
← Summary of the 10 June 1987 Island Council of La Palma election results →
Parties and alliances	Popular vote			Seats	
Parties and alliances	Votes	%	±pp	Total	+/−
People's Alliance (AP)^{1}	10,172	26.62	−9.74	6	−2
Spanish Socialist Workers' Party (PSOE)	10,128	26.50	−4.53	6	±0
La Palma Group of Independents (API)	9,329	24.41	New	5	+5
Democratic and Social Centre (CDS)	4,782	12.51	−5.67	2	−2
United Canarian Left (ICU)^{2}	3,640	9.53	−4.47	2	−1
Blank ballots	164	0.43	−0.01		
Total	38,215			21	±0
Valid votes	38,215	99.60	+0.71		
Invalid votes	155	0.40	−0.71		
Votes cast / turnout	38,370	66.92	+5.32		
Abstentions	18,970	33.08	−5.32		
Registered voters	57,340				
Sources
Footnotes: ^{1} People's Alliance results are compared to People's Coalition totals in the 1983 election.; ^{2} United Canarian Left results are compared to Communist Party of the Canaries totals in the 1983 election.

=== Lanzarote ===
← Summary of the 10 June 1987 Island Council of Lanzarote election results →
Parties and alliances	Popular vote			Seats	
Parties and alliances	Votes	%	±pp	Total	+/−
Democratic and Social Centre (CDS)	9,587	37.84	+19.74	10	+6
Spanish Socialist Workers' Party (PSOE)	8,605	33.96	−14.03	9	−3
Lanzarote Independents Group (AIL)	2,268	8.95	New	2	+2
United Canarian Left (ICU)^{1}	1,222	4.82	+0.53	0	±0
People's Democratic Party–Canarian Centrists (PDP–CC)	1,076	4.25	New	0	±0
National Congress of the Canaries (CNC)	1,004	3.96	New	0	±0
People's Alliance (AP)^{2}	823	3.25	−16.62	0	−5
Canarian Assembly–Canarian Nationalist Left (AC–INC)	583	2.30	New	0	±0
Blank ballots	168	0.66	+0.17		
Total	25,336			21	±0
Valid votes	25,336	98.84	+0.26		
Invalid votes	297	1.16	−0.26		
Votes cast / turnout	25,633	66.35	+7.27		
Abstentions	13,001	33.65	−7.27		
Registered voters	38,634				
Sources
Footnotes: ^{1} Democratic and Social Centre–Gomera Group of Independents results are compared to Gomera Group of Independents totals in the 1983 election.; ^{2} United Canarian Left results are compared to Communist Party of the Canaries totals in the 1983 election.; ^{3} People's Alliance results are compared to People's Coalition totals in the 1983 election.

=== Tenerife ===
← Summary of the 10 June 1987 Island Council of Tenerife election results →
Parties and alliances	Popular vote			Seats	
Parties and alliances	Votes	%	±pp	Total	+/−
Tenerife Group of Independents (ATI)	115,364	41.08	+20.54	13	+7
Spanish Socialist Workers' Party (PSOE)	90,317	32.16	−9.50	10	−3
Democratic and Social Centre (CDS)	29,682	10.57	+6.21	3	+3
People's Alliance (AP)^{1}	17,482	6.22	−17.58	1	−6
Canarian Assembly–Canarian Nationalist Left (AC–INC)^{2}	10,237	3.64	−2.58	0	−1
United Canarian Left (ICU)^{3}	9,161	3.26	+0.98	0	±0
National Congress of the Canaries (CNC)	2,767	0.99	New	0	±0
Union of Left Nationalists (UNI)	2,049	0.73	New	0	±0
Workers' Socialist Party (PST)	1,171	0.42	New	0	±0
Popular Front of the Canary Islands–Awañac (FREPIC–Awañac)	1,092	0.39	New	0	±0
Blank ballots	1,533	0.55	+0.16		
Total	280,855			27	±0
Valid votes	280,855	99.04	+0.67		
Invalid votes	2,724	0.96	−0.67		
Votes cast / turnout	283,579	68.80	+5.45		
Abstentions	128,587	31.20	−5.45		
Registered voters	412,166				
Sources
Footnotes: ^{1} People's Alliance results are compared to People's Coalition totals in the 1983 election.; ^{2} Canarian Assembly–Canarian Nationalist Left results are compared to Canarian People's Union–Canarian Assembly totals in the 1983 election.; ^{3} United Canarian Left results are compared to Communist Party of the Canaries totals in the 1983 election.
