= 1983 Canarian island council elections =

Elections in the Spanish region of the Canary Islands

Island council elections were held in the Canary Islands on 8 May 1983 to elect the 2nd Island Councils (the cabildos insulares) of El Hierro, Fuerteventura, Gran Canaria, La Gomera, La Palma, Lanzarote and Tenerife. All 137 seats in the seven island councils were up for election. They were held concurrently with regional elections in thirteen autonomous communities (including the Canary Islands) and local elections all across Spain.

== Overall ==
← Summary of the 8 May 1983 Canarian island council election results →
Parties and alliances	Popular vote			Seats	
Parties and alliances	Votes	%	±pp	Total	+/−
Spanish Socialist Workers' Party (PSOE)	221,611	38.41	+20.25	51	+25
People's Coalition (AP–PDP–UL)^{1}	148,185	25.68	+22.65	34	+32
Tenerife Group of Independents (ATI)	48,960	8.49	New	6	+6
Canarian People's Union–Canarian Assembly (UPC–AC)^{2}	41,515	7.20	−13.27	4	−6
Democratic and Social Centre (CDS)	34,808	6.03	New	10	+10
Liberal Canarian Party (PCL)	25,613	4.44	New	3	+3
Communist Party of the Canaries (PCC–PCE)	24,101	4.18	−1.40	4	±0
Party of the Canarian Country (PPC)	8,171	1.42	+0.05	0	±0
Majorera Assembly (AM)	5,692	0.99	−0.01	9	±0
Gomera Group of Independents (AGI)	3,499	0.61	New	5	+5
Independents of Fuerteventura (IF)	3,481	0.60	New	5	+5
Assembly (Tagoror)	2,562	0.44	+0.20	0	−1
Independent Herrenian Group (AHI)	1,879	0.33	±0.00	6	±0
Seven Green Stars (SEV)	1,803	0.31	New	0	±0
Popular Struggle Coalition (CLP)	1,243	0.22	New	0	±0
Popular Front of the Canaries (FPC)	760	0.13	n/a	0	±0
Canarian Nationalist Party (PNC)	193	0.03	New	0	±0
Union of the Democratic Centre (UCD)	n/a	n/a	−48.61	0	−79
Blank ballots	2,870	0.50	−0.03		
Total	576,946			137	±0
Valid votes	576,946	97.71	−0.56		
Invalid votes	13,498	2.29	+0.56		
Votes cast / turnout	590,444	63.08	+5.42		
Abstentions	345,533	36.92	−5.42		
Registered voters	935,977				
Sources
Footnotes: ^{1} People's Coalition results are compared to Democratic Coalition totals in the 1979 elections.; ^{2} Canarian People's Union–Canarian Assembly results are compared to the combined totals of Canarian People's Union and Neighbours' Assembly in the 1979 elections.

Popular vote
PSOE	38.41%
AP–PDP–UL	25.68%
ATI	8.49%
UPC–AC	7.20%
CDS	6.03%
PCL	4.44%
PCC–PCE	4.18%
PPC	1.42%
AM	0.99%
AGI	0.61%
IF	0.60%
AHI	0.33%
Others	1.14%
Blank ballots	0.50%

Seats
PSOE	37.23%
AP–PDP–UL	24.82%
CDS	7.30%
AM	6.57%
ATI	4.38%
AHI	4.38%
AGI	3.65%
IF	3.65%
UPC–AC	2.92%
PCC–PCE	2.92%
PCL	2.19%

== Island control ==
The following table lists party control in the island councils. Gains for a party are highlighted in that party's colour.

Island	Population	Previous control	New control
El Hierro	6,507	Independent Herrenian Group (AHI)	Independent Herrenian Group (AHI)
Fuerteventura	27,104	Majorera Assembly (AM)	Majorera Assembly (AM)
Gran Canaria	630,937	Union of the Democratic Centre (UCD)	Spanish Socialist Workers' Party (PSOE)
La Gomera	18,760	Gomera Group of Independents (AGI)	Gomera Group of Independents (AGI)
La Palma	76,426	People's Coalition (AP–PDP–UL)	People's Coalition (AP–PDP–UL)
Lanzarote	50,721	Union of the Democratic Centre (UCD)	Spanish Socialist Workers' Party (PSOE)
Tenerife	557,191	Tenerife Group of Independents (ATI)	Spanish Socialist Workers' Party (PSOE)

== Islands ==
=== El Hierro ===
← Summary of the 8 May 1983 Island Council of El Hierro election results →
Parties and alliances	Popular vote			Seats	
Parties and alliances	Votes	%	±pp	Total	+/−
Independent Herrenian Group (AHI)	1,879	54.69	+0.77	6	±0
People's Coalition (AP–PDP–UL)^{1}	880	25.61	+24.87	3	+3
Spanish Socialist Workers' Party (PSOE)	666	19.38	New	2	+2
Union of the Democratic Centre (UCD)	n/a	n/a	−44.96	0	−5
Blank ballots	11	0.32	−0.07		
Total	3,436			11	±0
Valid votes	3,436	99.22	−0.36		
Invalid votes	27	0.78	+0.36		
Votes cast / turnout	3,463	70.39	+16.18		
Abstentions	1,483	29.61	−16.18		
Registered voters	4,920				
Sources
Footnotes: ^{1} People's Coalition results are compared to Democratic Coalition totals in the 1979 election.

=== Fuerteventura ===
← Summary of the 8 May 1983 Island Council of Fuerteventura election results →
Parties and alliances	Popular vote			Seats	
Parties and alliances	Votes	%	±pp	Total	+/−
Majorera Assembly (AM)	5,692	45.93	−3.61	9	±0
Independents of Fuerteventura (IF)	3,481	28.09	New	5	+5
Spanish Socialist Workers' Party (PSOE)	1,243	10.03	+4.43	1	±0
People's Coalition (AP–PDP–UL)^{1}	1,086	8.76	−0.21	1	±0
Democratic and Social Centre (CDS)	874	7.05	New	1	+1
Union of the Democratic Centre (UCD)	n/a	n/a	−35.82	0	−6
Blank ballots	17	0.14	+0.07		
Total	12,393			17	±0
Valid votes	12,393	98.54	−1.03		
Invalid votes	183	1.46	+1.03		
Votes cast / turnout	12,576	66.14	+1.34		
Abstentions	6,439	33.86	−1.34		
Registered voters	19,015				
Sources
Footnotes: ^{1} People's Coalition results are compared to Democratic Coalition totals in the 1979 election.

=== Gran Canaria ===
← Summary of the 8 May 1983 Island Council of Gran Canaria election results →
Parties and alliances	Popular vote			Seats	
Parties and alliances	Votes	%	±pp	Total	+/−
Spanish Socialist Workers' Party (PSOE)	96,488	37.29	+24.45	12	+9
People's Coalition (AP–PDP–UL)^{1}	71,516	27.64	+27.15	8	+8
Canarian People's Union–Canarian Assembly (UPC–AC)^{2}	26,684	10.31	−20.56	3	−4
Liberal Canarian Party (PCL)	25,613	9.90	New	3	+3
Democratic and Social Centre (CDS)	13,515	5.22	New	1	+1
Communist Party of the Canaries (PCC–PCE)	12,269	4.74	−0.30	0	±0
Party of the Canarian Country (PPC)	8,171	3.16	+0.39	0	±0
Assembly (Tagoror)	1,619	0.63	New	0	±0
Popular Struggle Coalition (CLP)	1,243	0.48	New	0	±0
Union of the Democratic Centre (UCD)	n/a	n/a	−47.46	0	−17
Blank ballots	1,644	0.64	+0.11		
Total	258,762			27	±0
Valid votes	258,762	96.79	−1.11		
Invalid votes	8,573	3.21	+1.11		
Votes cast / turnout	267,335	63.17	−5.27		
Abstentions	155,852	36.83	+5.27		
Registered voters	423,187				
Sources
Footnotes: ^{1} People's Coalition results are compared to Democratic Coalition totals in the 1979 election.; ^{2} Canarian People's Union–Canarian Assembly results are compared to the combined totals of Canarian People's Union and Neighbours' Assembly in the 1979 election.

=== La Gomera ===
← Summary of the 8 May 1983 Island Council of La Gomera election results →
Parties and alliances	Popular vote			Seats	
Parties and alliances	Votes	%	±pp	Total	+/−
Gomera Group of Independents (AGI)	3,499	39.80	New	5	+5
Spanish Socialist Workers' Party (PSOE)	3,316	37.72	+0.76	5	−1
People's Coalition (AP–PDP–UL)	1,290	14.67	New	2	+2
Communist Party of the Canaries (PCC–PCE)	664	7.55	−5.20	1	−1
Union of the Democratic Centre (UCD)	n/a	n/a	−48.96	0	−9
Blank ballots	23	0.26	+0.12		
Total	8,792			13	−4
Valid votes	8,792	99.15	−0.14		
Invalid votes	75	0.85	+0.14		
Votes cast / turnout	8,867	62.46	+18.52		
Abstentions	5,330	37.54	−18.52		
Registered voters	14,197				

=== La Palma ===
← Summary of the 8 May 1983 Island Council of La Palma election results →
Parties and alliances	Popular vote			Seats	
Parties and alliances	Votes	%	±pp	Total	+/−
People's Coalition (AP–PDP–UL)	12,623	36.36	New	8	+8
Spanish Socialist Workers' Party (PSOE)	10,772	31.03	+10.60	6	+2
Democratic and Social Centre (CDS)	6,312	18.18	New	4	+4
Communist Party of the Canaries (PCC–PCE)	4,859	14.00	−0.10	3	+1
Union of the Democratic Centre (UCD)	n/a	n/a	−65.01	0	−15
Blank ballots	152	0.44	−0.02		
Total	34,718			21	±0
Valid votes	34,718	98.89	+0.32		
Invalid votes	391	1.11	−0.32		
Votes cast / turnout	35,109	61.60	+7.91		
Abstentions	21,887	38.40	−7.91		
Registered voters	56,996				

=== Lanzarote ===
← Summary of the 8 May 1983 Island Council of Lanzarote election results →
Parties and alliances	Popular vote			Seats	
Parties and alliances	Votes	%	±pp	Total	+/−
Spanish Socialist Workers' Party (PSOE)	9,817	47.99	+24.11	12	+7
People's Coalition (AP–PDP–UL)	4,064	19.87	New	5	+5
Democratic and Social Centre (CDS)	3,702	18.10	New	4	+4
Assembly (Tagoror)	943	4.61	−2.46	0	−1
Communist Party of the Canaries (PCC–PCE)	878	4.29	+0.78	0	±0
Popular Front of the Canaries (FPC)	760	3.72	n/a	0	±0
Canarian Nationalist Party (PNC)	193	0.94	New	0	±0
Union of the Democratic Centre (UCD)	n/a	n/a	−56.39	0	−11
Blank ballots	100	0.49	+0.26		
Total	20,457			21	+4
Valid votes	20,457	98.58	−0.55		
Invalid votes	294	1.42	+0.55		
Votes cast / turnout	20,751	59.08	+0.86		
Abstentions	14,373	40.92	−0.86		
Registered voters	35,124				

=== Tenerife ===
← Summary of the 8 May 1983 Island Council of Tenerife election results →
Parties and alliances	Popular vote			Seats	
Parties and alliances	Votes	%	±pp	Total	+/−
Spanish Socialist Workers' Party (PSOE)	99,309	41.66	+17.08	13	+6
People's Coalition (AP–PDP–UL)^{1}	56,726	23.80	+16.77	7	+6
Tenerife Group of Independents (ATI)	48,960	20.54	New	6	+6
Canarian People's Union–Canarian Assembly (UPC–AC)	14,831	6.22	−7.46	1	−2
Democratic and Social Centre (CDS)	10,405	4.36	New	0	±0
Communist Party of the Canaries (PCC–PCE)	5,431	2.28	−2.94	0	±0
Seven Green Stars (SEV)	1,803	0.76	New	0	±0
Union of the Democratic Centre (UCD)	n/a	n/a	−47.53	0	−16
Blank ballots	923	0.39	−0.23		
Total	238,388			27	±0
Valid votes	238,388	98.37	−0.12		
Invalid votes	3,955	1.63	+0.12		
Votes cast / turnout	242,343	63.35	+14.99		
Abstentions	140,195	36.65	−14.99		
Registered voters	382,538				
Sources
Footnotes: ^{1} People's Coalition results are compared to Democratic Coalition totals in the 1979 election.
