= 1987 Canarian regional election =

Election in the Spanish region of the Canary Islands

- 10 June 1987

All 60 seats in the Parliament of the Canary Islands 31 seats needed for a majority
- Opinion polls
- Registered: 1,002,775 ▲8.3%
- Turnout: 676,795 (67.5%) ▲5.1 pp
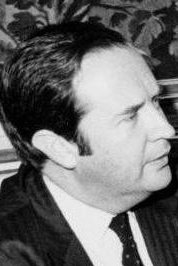

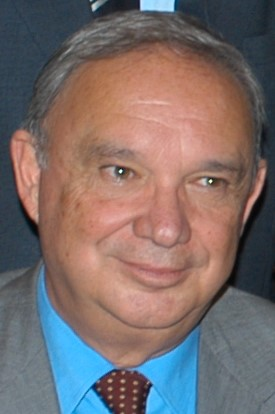

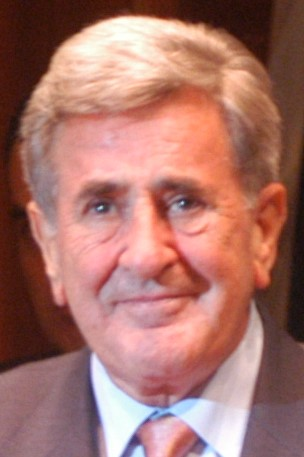

| | First party | Second party | Third party |
|---|---|---|---|
| Leader | Jerónimo Saavedra | Fernando Fernández Martín | Manuel Hermoso |
| Party | PSOE | CDS | AIC |
| Leader since | 1977 | 1983 | 1986 |
| Leader's seat | Gran Canaria | Tenerife | Tenerife |
| Last election | 27 seats, 41.5% | 8 seats, 7.8% (Note: Results for CDS (7.2%, 6 seats) and AGI (0.6%, 2 seats) in the 1983 election.) | 0 seats, 0.5% (Note: Results for AIL in the 1983 election.) |
| Seats won | 21 | 13 | 11 |
| Seat change | ▼6 | ▲5 | ▲11 |
| Popular vote | 185,749 | 130,297 | 134,667 |
| Percentage | 27.8% | 19.5% | 20.1% |
| Swing | ▼13.7 pp | ▲11.7 pp | ▲19.6 pp |
| | Fourth party | Fifth party | Sixth party |
| Leader | Paulino Montesdeoca | Pedro Lezcano Montalvo | Antonio Fernández Viéitez |
| Party | AP | AC–INC | IU |
| Leader since | 1987 | 1987 | 1987 |
| Leader's seat | Gran Canaria | Gran Canaria | Gran Canaria |
| Last election | 17 seats, 29.0% (Note: Results for AP–PDP–UL in the 1983 election.) | 2 seats, 8.3% (Note: Results for UPC–AC in the 1983 election.) | 1 seat, 4.4% (Note: Results for PCC–PCE in the 1983 election.) |
| Seats won | 6 | 2 | 2 |
| Seat change | ▼11 | 0 | ▲1 |
| Popular vote | 74,767 | 46,229 | 40,837 |
| Percentage | 11.2% | 6.9% | 6.1% |
| Swing | ▼17.8 pp | ▼1.4 pp | ▲1.7 pp |
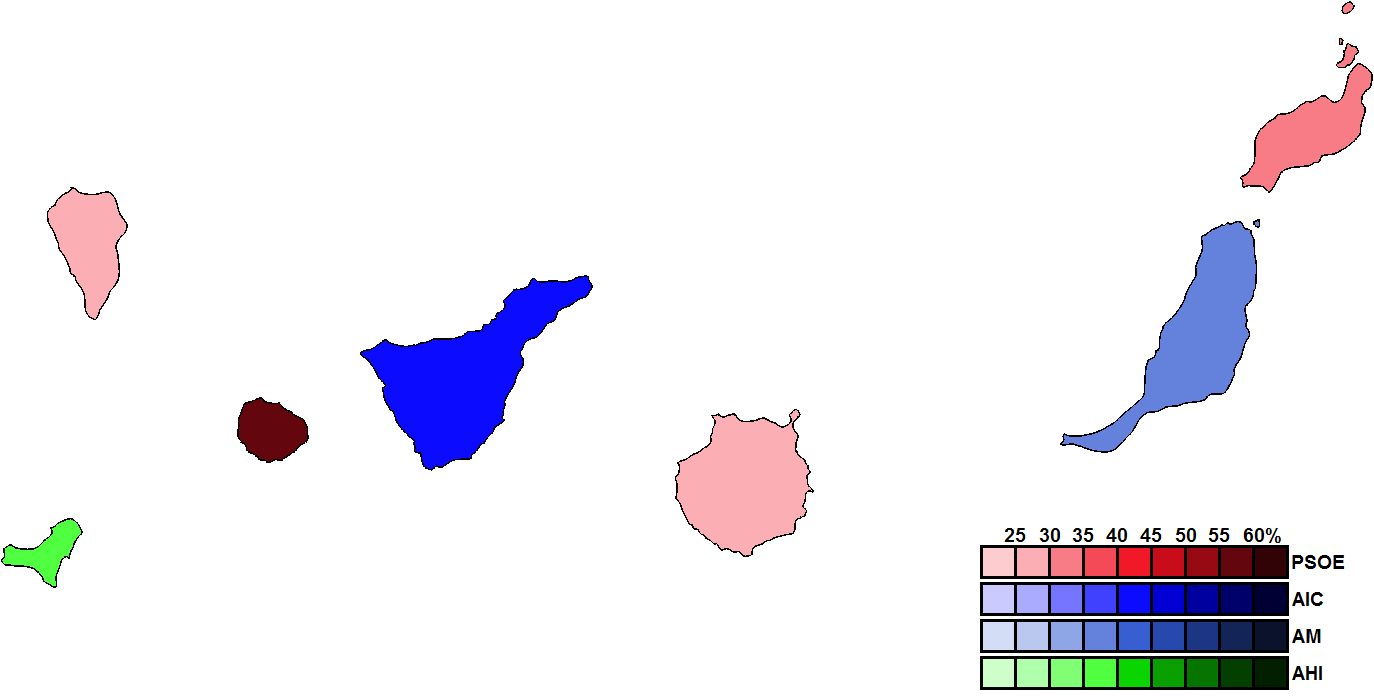
- Constituency results map for the Parliament of the Canary Islands
President before election
Jerónimo Saavedra
PSOE
President after election
Fernando Fernández Martín
CDS

A regional election was held in the Canary Islands on 10 June 1987 to elect the 2nd Parliament of the autonomous community. All 60 seats in the Parliament were up for election. It was held concurrently with regional elections in twelve other autonomous communities and local elections all across Spain, as well as the 1987 European Parliament election.

== Overview ==
Under the 1982 Statute of Autonomy, the Parliament of the Canary Islands was the unicameral legislature of the homonymous autonomous community, having legislative power in devolved matters, as well as the ability to grant or withdraw confidence from a regional president. The electoral and procedural rules were supplemented by national law provisions.

=== Date ===
The term of the Parliament of the Canary Islands expired four years after the date of its previous ordinary election. The election decree was required to be issued no later than 25 days before the scheduled expiration date of parliament and published on the following day in the Official Gazette of the Canaries (BOC), with election day taking place between 54 and 60 days after the decree's publication. The previous election was held on 8 May 1983, which meant that the chamber's term would have expired on 8 May 1987. The election decree was required to be published in the BOC no later than 14 April 1987, setting the latest possible date for election day on 13 June 1987.

The Parliament of the Canary Islands could not be dissolved before the expiration date of parliament, except in the event of an investiture process failing to elect a regional president within a two-month period from the first ballot. In such a case, the Parliament was to be automatically dissolved and a snap election called, with elected lawmakers serving the remainder of its original four-year term.

The election to the Parliament of the Canary Islands was officially called on 2 April 1991 with the publication of the corresponding decree in the BOC, setting election day for 26 May.

=== Electoral system ===
Voting for the Parliament was based on universal suffrage, comprising all Spanish nationals over 18 years of age, registered in the Canary Islands and with full political rights, provided that they had not been deprived of the right to vote by a final sentence, nor were legally incapacitated.

The Parliament of the Canary Islands had a minimum of 50 and a maximum of 70 seats, with electoral provisions fixing its size at 60. All were elected in seven multi-member constituencies—corresponding to the islands of El Hierro, Fuerteventura, Gran Canaria, La Gomera, La Palma, Lanzarote and Tenerife, each of which was assigned a fixed number of seats—using the D'Hondt method and closed-list proportional voting, with a 20 percent-threshold of valid votes (including blank ballots) in each constituency or three percent regionally.

As a result of the aforementioned allocation, each Parliament constituency was entitled the following seats:

| Seats | Constituencies |
|---|---|
| 15 | Gran Canaria, Tenerife |
| 8 | La Palma, Lanzarote |
| 7 | Fuerteventura |
| 4 | La Gomera |
| 3 | El Hierro |

The law did not provide for by-elections to fill vacant seats; instead, any vacancies arising after the proclamation of candidates and during the legislative term were filled by the next candidates on the party lists or, when required, by designated substitutes.

== Opinion polls ==
The tables below list opinion polling results in reverse chronological order, showing the most recent first and using the dates when the survey fieldwork was done, as opposed to the date of publication. Where the fieldwork dates are unknown, the date of publication is given instead. The highest percentage figure in each polling survey is displayed with its background shaded in the leading party's colour. If a tie ensues, this is applied to the figures with the highest percentages. The "Lead" column on the right shows the percentage-point difference between the parties with the highest percentages in a poll.

=== Voting intention estimates ===
The table below lists weighted voting intention estimates. Refusals are generally excluded from the party vote percentages, while question wording and the treatment of "don't know" responses and those not intending to vote may vary between polling organisations. When available, seat projections determined by the polling organisations are displayed below (or in place of) the percentages in a smaller font; 31 seats were required for an absolute majority in the Parliament of the Canary Islands.

| Polling firm/Commissioner | Fieldwork date | Sample size | Turnout | PSOE | AP–PDP–PL | AC | CDS | ICU | UCC | AM | AGI | AIC | AHI | AP | PDP | Lead |
|---|---|---|---|---|---|---|---|---|---|---|---|---|---|---|---|---|
| 1987 regional election | 10 Jun 1987 | —N/a | 67.4 | 27.8; 21 | – | 6.9; 2 | 19.5; 13 | 6.1; 2 | 2.3; 0 | 0.8; 3 | (Note: Within CDS.) | 20.1; 11 | 0.2; 2 | 11.2; 6 | 2.0; 0 | 7.7 |
| Demoscopia/El País | 22–26 May 1987 | ? | 68 | 30.8; 20 | – | 2.9; 2 | 26.7; 16 | 5.4; 3 | – | ? 3 | | 12.2; 2 | – | 18.9; 14 | – | 4.1 |
| 1986 general election | 22 Jun 1986 | —N/a | 68.3 | 36.1 | 23.3 | 5.5 | 16.9 | 4.3 | – | – | – | 9.8 | – | (Note: Within CP.) | | 12.8 |
| 1983 regional election | 8 May 1983 | —N/a | 62.4 | 41.5; 27 | 29.0; 17 | 8.3; 2 | 7.2; 6 | 4.4 (Note: Result for PCC–PCE.); 1 | 4.3; 1 | 1.0; 3 | 0.6; 2 | 0.5; 0 | 0.2; 1 | | | 12.5 |

== Results ==
=== Overall ===
← Summary of the 10 June 1987 Parliament of the Canary Islands election results →
| Parties and alliances | Popular vote | | | Seats | |
| Parties and alliances | Votes | % | ±pp | Total | +/− |
|---|---|---|---|---|---|
| Spanish Socialist Workers' Party (PSOE) | 185,749 | 27.77 | −13.73 | 21 | −6 |
| Canarian Independent Groups (AIC)^{1} | 134,667 | 20.13 | +19.65 | 11 | +11 |
| Democratic and Social Centre (CDS)^{2} | 130,297 | 19.48 | +11.66 | 13 | +5 |
| People's Alliance (AP)^{3} | 74,767 | 11.18 | −17.80 | 6 | −11 |
| Canarian Assembly–Canarian Nationalist Left (AC–INC)^{4} | 46,229 | 6.91 | −1.39 | 2 | ±0 |
| United Canarian Left (ICU)^{5} | 40,837 | 6.10 | +1.69 | 2 | +1 |
| Centre Canarian Union (UCC)^{6} | 15,580 | 2.33 | −1.99 | 0 | −1 |
| People's Democratic Party–Canarian Centrists (PDP–CC) | 13,274 | 1.98 | New | 0 | ±0 |
| National Congress of the Canaries (CNC) | 8,769 | 1.31 | New | 0 | ±0 |
| Majorera Assembly (AM) | 5,423 | 0.81 | −0.17 | 3 | ±0 |
| Workers' Socialist Party (PST) | 2,110 | 0.32 | −0.37 | 0 | ±0 |
| Independent Herrenian Group (AHI) | 1,415 | 0.21 | +0.04 | 2 | +1 |
| Union of Left Nationalists (UNI) | 1,287 | 0.19 | New | 0 | ±0 |
| Humanist Platform (PH) | 1,146 | 0.17 | New | 0 | ±0 |
| Popular Front of the Canary Islands–Awañac (FREPIC–Awañac) | 1,106 | 0.17 | New | 0 | ±0 |
| Workers' Party of Spain–Communist Unity (PTE–UC) | 987 | 0.15 | New | 0 | ±0 |
| Assembly (Tagoror) | 552 | 0.08 | New | 0 | ±0 |
| Canarian Democratic Union (UDC) | 428 | 0.06 | New | 0 | ±0 |
| Blank ballots | 4,321 | 0.65 | +0.65 | | |
| Total | 668,944 | | | 60 | ±0 |
| Valid votes | 668,944 | 98.84 | +1.24 | | |
| Invalid votes | 7,851 | 1.16 | −1.24 | | |
| Votes cast / turnout | 676,795 | 67.49 | +5.08 | | |
| Abstentions | 325,980 | 32.51 | −5.08 | | |
| Registered voters | 1,002,775 | | | | |
Sources
Footnotes: ^{1} Canarian Independent Groups results are compared to Lanzarote Independents Group totals in the 1983 election.; ^{2} Democratic and Social Centre results are compared to the combined totals of Democratic and Social Centre and Gomera Group of Independents in the 1983 election.; ^{3} People's Alliance results are compared to People's Coalition totals in the 1983 election.; ^{4} Canarian Assembly–Canarian Nationalist Left results are compared to Canarian People's Union–Canarian Assembly totals in the 1983 election.; ^{5} United Canarian Left results are compared to Communist Party of the Canaries totals in the 1983 election.; ^{6} Centre Canarian Union results are compared to Canarian Nationalist Convergence totals in the 1983 election.

Popular vote
| PSOE | 27.77% |
| AIC | 20.13% |
| CDS | 19.48% |
| AP | 11.18% |
| AC–INC | 6.91% |
| ICU | 6.10% |
| UCC | 2.33% |
| PDP–CC | 1.98% |
| CNC | 1.31% |
| AM | 0.81% |
| AHI | 0.21% |
| Others | 1.14% |
| Blank ballots | 0.65% |

Seats
| PSOE | 35.00% |
| CDS | 21.67% |
| AIC | 18.33% |
| AP | 10.00% |
| AM | 5.00% |
| AC–INC | 3.33% |
| ICU | 3.33% |
| AHI | 3.33% |

=== Distribution by constituency ===
| Constituency | PSOE | | AIC | | CDS | | AP | | AC–INC | | ICU | | AM | | AHI | |
| Constituency | % | S | % | S | % | S | % | S | % | S | % | S | % | S | % | S |
|---|---|---|---|---|---|---|---|---|---|---|---|---|---|---|---|---|
| El Hierro | 23.9 | 1 | | | 10.4 | − | 16.7 | − | | | 13.3 | − | | | 35.5 | 2 |
| Fuerteventura | 15.8 | 1 | 14.7 | 1 | 27.0 | 2 | 5.2 | − | | | | | 35.8 | 3 | | |
| Gran Canaria | 26.8 | 5 | 1.6 | − | 25.1 | 4 | 15.3 | 3 | 10.1 | 2 | 8.3 | 1 | | | | |
| La Gomera | 58.3 | 3 | 2.5 | − | 29.4 | 1 | 4.3 | − | | | 4.9 | − | | | | |
| La Palma | 26.2 | 2 | 25.6 | 2 | 16.7 | 1 | 20.0 | 2 | | | 11.1 | 1 | | | | |
| Lanzarote | 34.4 | 4 | 10.1 | 1 | 32.0 | 3 | 4.0 | − | 2.5 | − | 4.6 | − | | | | |
| Tenerife | 28.3 | 5 | 41.5 | 7 | 12.0 | 2 | 6.6 | 1 | 5.5 | − | 3.4 | − | | | | |
| Total | 27.8 | 21 | 20.1 | 11 | 19.5 | 13 | 11.2 | 6 | 6.9 | 2 | 6.1 | 2 | 0.8 | 3 | 0.2 | 2 |

== Aftermath ==
=== Government formation ===
Investiture; Nomination of Fernando Fernández Martín (CDS)
| Ballot → | 29 July 1987 |
| Required majority → | 31 out of 60 |
| Yes: • CDS (13); • AIC (10); • AP (6); • AHI (2) | 31 / 60 |
| No: • PSOE (21); • AM (3); • ICU (2); • AC–INC (2) | 28 / 60 |
| Abstentions | 0 / 60 |
| Absentees: • AIC (1) | 1 / 60 |

=== 1988 motion of confidence ===
Motion of confidence General Policy Statement (President)
| Ballot → | 30 November 1988 |
| Required majority → | Simple |
| Yes: • CDS (13); • AP (6); • AHI (2) | 21 / 60 |
| No: • PSOE (20); • AM (3); • ICU (2); • AC–INC (2) | 27 / 60 |
| Abstentions: • AIC (11) | 11 / 60 |
| Absentees: • PSOE (1) | 1 / 60 |

=== 1988 investiture ===
Investiture; Nomination of Lorenzo Olarte (CDS)
| Ballot → | 27 December 1988 |
| Required majority → | 31 out of 60 |
| Yes: • CDS (12); • AIC (11); • AP (6); • AHI (2) | 31 / 60 |
| No: • PSOE (21); • AM (3); • ICU (2); • AC–INC (2) | 28 / 60 |
| Abstentions | 0 / 60 |
| Absentees: • CDS (1) | 1 / 60 |

== Bibliography ==
Legislation

- Ley Orgánica 10/1982, de 10 de agosto, de Estatuto de Autonomía de Canarias (Organic Law 10/1982). Official State Gazette (in Spanish). 10 August 1982 [version as of 16 August 1982]. BOE-A-1982-20821.
- Ley Orgánica 5/1985, de 19 de junio, del Régimen Electoral General (Organic Law 5/1985). Official State Gazette (in Spanish). 19 June 1985 [version as of 3 April 1987]. BOE-A-1985-11672.
- Ley 3/1987, de 3 de abril, de medidas urgentes en materia electoral (Law 3/1987). Official State Gazette (in Spanish). 3 April 1987. BOE-A-1987-9084.
- Decreto 63/1987, de 13 de abril, del Presidente de la Comunidad Autónoma de Canarias, por el que se convocan elecciones al Parlamento de Canarias (PDF) (Decree 63/1987). Official Gazette of the Canaries (in Spanish). 13 April 1987.

Other

- Government of the Canary Islands (November 1987). Resultados procesos electorales en Canarias. Elecciones Locales: Ayuntamientos y Cabildos (1979-1983-1987). Elecciones Autonómicas: Parlamento de Canarias (1983-1987) (PDF) (in Spanish). Las Palmas de Gran Canaria: Statistics and Documentation Center of the Canary Islands. pp. 203–270. Archived from the original on 2017-04-17.
