= 1987 Spanish regional elections =

- 10 June 1987

779 seats in the regional parliaments of Aragon, Asturias, Balearic Islands, Canary Islands, Cantabria, Castile and León, Castilla–La Mancha, Extremadura, La Rioja, Madrid, Murcia, Navarre and Valencian Community
Regional administrations after the 1987 regional elections
National parties
PSOE
AP
CDS
Regional parties
CiU
EAJ/PNV
PAR

Regional elections were held in Spain during 1987 to elect the regional parliaments of thirteen of the seventeen autonomous communities: Aragon, Asturias, the Balearic Islands, the Canary Islands, Cantabria, Castile and León, Castilla–La Mancha, Extremadura, La Rioja, Madrid, Murcia, Navarre and the Valencian Community. 779 of 1,169 seats in the regional parliaments were up for election. The elections were held were held on 10 June (concurrently with local elections all across the country, as well as the 1987 European Parliament election).

The Spanish Socialist Workers' Party (PSOE) remained the largest party overall, as well as in most regional parliaments. However, it suffered from a drop in popular support which saw it losing many of the absolute majorities it had obtained four years previously. As a result, several centre-right coalitions and alliances were able to oust the Socialists from government in four out of the twelve regional administrations it had held previous to the election. The main national opposition party, the People's Alliance (AP), having suffered from an internal crisis and the breakup of the People's Coalition in 1986, also lost support compared to the previous election. Its former allies, the People's Democratic Party (PDP) and the Liberal Party (PL), stood separately in the regional elections but remained unable to capitalize on AP's losses.

Benefitting from the two main parties' decline was former Spanish Prime Minister Adolfo Suárez's Democratic and Social Centre (CDS), which became decisive for government formation in many regional assemblies. United Left (IU), a coalition made up by the Communist Party of Spain (PCE) and other minor left-wing groups, remained stagnant at the PCE's 1983 results.

== Election date ==
Determination of election day varied depending on the autonomous community, with each one having competency to establish its own regulations. Typically, thirteen out of the seventeen autonomous communities—all but Andalusia, the Basque Country, Catalonia and Galicia—had their elections fixed to be held within sixty days from the day of expiry of the regional assemblies, together with nationwide local elections.

== Regional governments ==
The following table lists party control in autonomous communities. Gains for a party are highlighted in that party's colour.

Election day	Region	Previous control	New control
10 June	Aragon	Spanish Socialist Workers' Party (PSOE)	Regionalist Aragonese Party (PAR)
10 June	Asturias	Spanish Socialist Workers' Party (PSOE)	Spanish Socialist Workers' Party (PSOE)
10 June	Balearics	People's Alliance (AP)	People's Alliance (AP)
10 June	Canary Islands	Spanish Socialist Workers' Party (PSOE)	Democratic and Social Centre (CDS)
10 June	Cantabria	People's Alliance (AP)	People's Alliance (AP) (PSOE in 1990)
10 June	Castile and León	Spanish Socialist Workers' Party (PSOE)	People's Alliance (AP)
10 June	Castilla–La Mancha	Spanish Socialist Workers' Party (PSOE)	Spanish Socialist Workers' Party (PSOE)
10 June	Extremadura	Spanish Socialist Workers' Party (PSOE)	Spanish Socialist Workers' Party (PSOE)
10 June	La Rioja	Spanish Socialist Workers' Party (PSOE)	People's Alliance (AP) (PSOE in 1990)
10 June	Madrid	Spanish Socialist Workers' Party (PSOE)	Spanish Socialist Workers' Party (PSOE)
10 June	Murcia	Spanish Socialist Workers' Party (PSOE)	Spanish Socialist Workers' Party (PSOE)
10 June	Navarre	Spanish Socialist Workers' Party (PSOE)	Spanish Socialist Workers' Party (PSOE)
10 June	Valencian Community	Spanish Socialist Workers' Party (PSOE)	Spanish Socialist Workers' Party (PSOE)

== Opinion polls ==
Individual poll results are listed in the table below in reverse chronological order, showing the most recent first, and using the date the survey's fieldwork was done, as opposed to the date of publication. If such date is unknown, the date of publication is given instead. The highest percentage figure in each polling survey is displayed with its background shaded in the leading party's colour. In the instance of a tie, the figures with the highest percentages are shaded. in the case of seat projections, they are displayed in bold and in a different font.

Polling firm/Commissioner	Fieldwork date	Sample size	PSOE	AP	CDS	IU	Other
**1987 regional elections**	10 Jun 1987	—N/a	329	231	102	24	93
Demoscopia/El País	22–26 May 1987	11,000	303/313	235/240	123/131	27/33	65/71
**1983 regional elections**	8 May 1983	—N/a	388	273	9	27	67

== June ==
=== Aragon ===
Parties and alliances	Votes	%	±pp	Seats	+/−
PSOE	228,170	35.68	−11.15	**27**	−6
PAR	179,922	28.14	+7.63	**19**	+6
AP	99,082	15.49	−7.14	**13**	−5
CDS	65,406	10.23	+6.94	**6**	+5
CAA–IU	31,352	4.90	+0.94	**2**	+1
PTE–UC	8,435	1.32	New	0	±0
PDP	7,887	1.23	New	0	±0
Others	10,028	1.57		0	±0
Blank ballots	9,186	1.44	+0.79		
Valid votes	639,468	98.80	+0.22		
Invalid votes	7,789	1.20	−0.22		
Votes cast / turnout	647,257	69.70	+2.96		
**Registered voters**	**928,584**				

=== Asturias ===
Parties and alliances	Votes	%	±pp	Seats	+/−
PSOE	223,307	38.91	−13.05	**20**	−6
AP	144,541	25.18	−5.05	**13**	−1
CDS	106,266	18.52	+15.07	**8**	+8
IU	69,413	12.09	+0.96	**4**	−1
PAS	7,348	1.28	New	0	±0
Others	15,991	2.79		0	±0
Blank ballots	7,076	1.23	+0.82		
Valid votes	573,942	98.60	−0.74		
Invalid votes	8,135	1.40	+0.74		
Votes cast / turnout	582,077	66.58	+1.54		
**Registered voters**	**874,310**				

=== Balearics ===
Parties and alliances	Votes	%	±pp	Seats	+/−
AP–PL	123,130	36.71	+1.13	**25**	+4
PSOE	108,910	32.47	−2.24	**21**	±0
CDS	34,146	10.18	+8.05	**5**	+5
UM	30,247	9.02	−6.07	**4**	−2
PSM–EN	16,383	4.88	−0.58	**2**	±0
PSM–EU	11,795	3.52	−0.15	**2**	±0
PDP	5,212	1.55	New	0	±0
PDL	n/a	n/a	−1.25	0	−1
CIM	n/a	n/a	−1.05	0	−1
Others	2,033	0.61		0	±0
Blank ballots	3,525	1.05	+0.46		
Valid votes	335,381	98.77	+0.31		
Invalid votes	4,163	1.23	−0.31		
Votes cast / turnout	339,544	66.94	+2.27		
**Registered voters**	**507,258**				

=== Canary Islands ===
Parties and alliances	Votes	%	±pp	Seats	+/−
PSOE	185,749	27.77	−13.73	**21**	−6
AIC	134,667	20.13	+19.65	**11**	+11
CDS	130,297	19.48	+11.66	**13**	+5
AP	74,767	11.18	−17.80	**6**	−11
AC–INC	46,229	6.91	−1.39	**2**	±0
ICU	40,837	6.10	+1.69	**2**	+1
UCC	15,580	2.33	−1.99	0	−1
PDP–CC	13,274	1.98	New	0	±0
CNC	8,769	1.31	New	0	±0
AM	5,423	0.81	−0.17	**3**	±0
AHI	1,415	0.21	+0.04	**2**	+1
Others	7,616	1.14		0	±0
Blank ballots	4,321	0.65	+0.65		
Valid votes	668,944	98.84	+1.24		
Invalid votes	7,851	1.16	−1.24		
Votes cast / turnout	676,795	67.49	+5.08		
**Registered voters**	**1,002,775**				

=== Cantabria ===
Parties and alliances	Votes	%	±pp	Seats	+/−
AP	122,964	41.68	−2.31	**19**	+1
PSOE	87,230	29.57	−8.84	**13**	−2
PRC	37,950	12.86	+6.13	**5**	+3
CDS	19,370	6.57	+4.00	**2**	+2
IU	10,659	3.61	−0.35	0	±0
PDP	6,964	2.36	New	0	±0
Others	6,589	2.23		0	±0
Blank ballots	3,292	1.12	+0.56		
Valid votes	295,018	98.63	+0.11		
Invalid votes	4,097	1.37	−0.11		
Votes cast / turnout	299,115	75.72	+2.16		
**Registered voters**	**395,043**				

=== Castile and León ===
Parties and alliances	Votes	%	±pp	Seats	+/−
AP	493,488	34.36	−5.29	**32**	−7
PSOE	488,469	34.01	−10.36	**32**	−10
CDS	278,253	19.37	+13.41	**18**	+16
IU	54,676	3.81	+0.58	0	±0
PDP	35,080	2.44	New	**1**	+1
SI	19,282	1.34	New	**1**	+1
PDL	n/a	n/a	−2.72	0	−1
Others	44,294	3.08		0	±0
Blank ballots	22,690	1.58	+0.62		
Valid votes	1,436,232	98.28	−0.23		
Invalid votes	25,154	1.72	+0.23		
Votes cast / turnout	1,461,386	73.15	+3.31		
**Registered voters**	**1,997,693**				

=== Castilla–La Mancha ===
Parties and alliances	Votes	%	±pp	Seats	+/−
PSOE	435,121	46.33	−0.37	**25**	+2
AP	319,978	34.07	−6.85	**18**	−3
CDS	98,539	10.49	+7.47	**4**	+4
IU	50,366	5.36	−1.50	0	±0
PDP	15,863	1.69	New	0	±0
Others	10,095	1.07		0	±0
Blank ballots	9,247	0.98	+0.33		
Valid votes	939,209	98.84	+0.02		
Invalid votes	11,053	1.16	−0.02		
Votes cast / turnout	950,262	75.43	+2.11		
**Registered voters**	**1,259,742**				

=== Extremadura ===
Parties and alliances	Votes	%	±pp	Seats	+/−
PSOE	292,935	49.18	−3.84	**34**	−1
AP	144,117	24.19	−5.91	**17**	−3
CDS	73,554	12.35	+11.56	**8**	+8
EU	34,606	5.81	−2.67	**4**	−2
IU	32,240	5.41	−1.07	**2**	−2
Others	13,425	2.25		0	±0
Blank ballots	4,785	0.80	+0.33		
Valid votes	595,662	99.01	−0.08		
Invalid votes	5,935	0.99	+0.08		
Votes cast / turnout	601,597	74.39	+2.49		
**Registered voters**	**808,654**				

=== La Rioja ===
Parties and alliances	Votes	%	±pp	Seats	+/−
PSOE	57,178	39.64	−7.53	**14**	−4
AP	50,179	34.78	−5.20	**13**	−2
CDS	15,640	10.84	+8.43	**4**	+4
PRP	9,212	6.39	−1.07	**2**	±0
PDP	4,721	3.27	New	0	±0
IU	3,478	2.41	+0.24	0	±0
PTE–UC	1,400	0.97	New	0	±0
Blank ballots	2,452	1.70	+0.89		
Valid votes	144,260	98.63	−0.20		
Invalid votes	1,998	1.37	+0.20		
Votes cast / turnout	146,258	72.50	+2.26		
**Registered voters**	**201,738**				

=== Madrid ===
Parties and alliances	Votes	%	±pp	Seats	+/−
PSOE	932,878	38.45	−12.02	**40**	−11
AP	762,102	31.41	−2.72	**32**	−2
CDS	403,440	16.63	+13.51	**17**	+17
IU	181,512	7.48	−1.37	**7**	−2
PTE–UC	41,323	1.70	New	0	±0
LV	26,187	1.08	New	0	±0
Others	36,834	1.52		0	±0
Blank ballots	42,196	1.74	+1.15		
Valid votes	2,426,472	98.78	−0.51		
Invalid votes	29,995	1.22	+0.51		
Votes cast / turnout	2,456,467	69.87	+0.16		
**Registered voters**	**3,515,847**				

=== Murcia ===
Parties and alliances	Votes	%	±pp	Seats	+/−
PSOE	221,377	43.71	−8.52	**25**	−1
AP	159,566	31.51	−3.91	**16**	±0
CDS	60,406	11.93	+10.79	**3**	+3
IU	37,708	7.45	+0.43	**1**	±0
PCAN	17,207	3.40	+0.57	0	±0
Others	5,307	1.05		0	±0
Blank ballots	4,862	0.96	+0.39		
Valid votes	506,433	98.84	−0.15		
Invalid votes	5,928	1.16	+0.15		
Votes cast / turnout	512,361	72.98	+4.51		
**Registered voters**	**702,068**				

=== Navarre ===
Parties and alliances	Votes	%	±pp	Seats	+/−
PSN–PSOE	78,453	27.68	−7.95	**15**	−5
UPN	69,419	24.50	+1.16	**14**	+1
HB	38,138	13.46	+2.91	**7**	+1
CDS	21,022	7.42	New	**4**	+4
EA	19,840	7.00	New	**4**	+4
PDF–PDP, PL (UDF)	17,663	6.23	New	**3**	+3
AP	11,985	4.23	−9.89	**2**	−6
EE	9,618	3.39	+1.02	**1**	+1
Batzarre	5,880	2.07	New	0	±0
IU	3,802	1.34	+0.70	0	±0
EAJ/PNV	2,661	0.94	−5.89	0	−3
PTE–UC	964	0.34	New	0	±0
Blank ballots	3,950	1.39	+0.70		
Valid votes	283,395	98.84	+0.01		
Invalid votes	3,327	1.16	−0.01		
Votes cast / turnout	286,722	72.90	+2.04		
**Registered voters**	**393,326**				

=== Valencian Community ===
Parties and alliances	Votes	%	±pp	Seats	+/−
PSOE	828,961	41.28	−10.13	**42**	−9
AP	476,099	23.71	n/a	**25**	−2
CDS	225,663	11.24	+9.36	**10**	+10
UV	183,541	9.14	n/a	**6**	+1
IU–UPV	159,579	7.95	−2.58	**6**	±0
PTE–UC	33,770	1.68	New	0	±0
LV	22,262	1.11	New	0	±0
PDP–CV	20,171	1.00	New	0	±0
Others	36,686	1.83		0	±0
Blank ballots	21,497	1.07	+0.38		
Valid votes	2,008,229	98.88	−0.09		
Invalid votes	22,652	1.12	+0.09		
Votes cast / turnout	2,030,881	74.45	+1.71		
**Registered voters**	**2,727,703**				
