= 1987 Spanish local elections =

- 10 June 1987 (Note: By-elections were held on 8 November 1987 in those constituencies where results were annulled by a final sentence following an electoral petition, or where elections were not held due to a lack of candidates.)

65,577 councillors in 8,062 municipal councils All 1,377 provincial/island seats in 44 provinces (Note: Including: 1,028 seats in 38 provincial deputations; 153 seats in 3 Basque foral deputations; 137 seats in 7 Canarian island cabildos; 59 seats in 3 Balearic island councils.)
- Registered: 28,442,348 ▲3.5%
- Turnout: 19,744,334 (69.4%) ▲0.8 pp
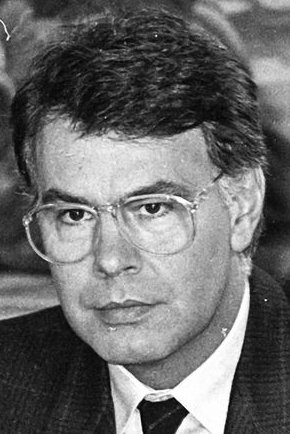

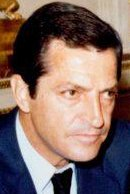

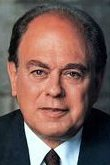

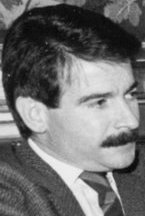

| | First party | Second party | Third party |
|---|---|---|---|
| Leader | Felipe González | Antonio Hernández Mancha | Adolfo Suárez |
| Party | PSOE | AP | CDS |
| Leader since | 13 October 1974 | 8 February 1987 | 29 July 1982 |
| Last election | 23,729 c., 41.9% 638 p. | 21,076 c., 25.7% (Note: Results for AP–PDP–UL in the 1983 elections.); 419 p. | 658 c., 1.8% (Note: Results for CDS (1.8%, 658 c. and 18 p.) and AGI (0.0%, 26 c. and 5 p.) in the 1983 elections.); 23 p. |
| Seats won | 23,241 c. 588 p. | 16,581 c. 336 p. | 5,972 c. 116 p. |
| Seat change | ▼488 c. ▼50 p. | ▼4,495 c. ▼83 p. | ▲5,288 c. ▲93 p. |
| Popular vote | 7,229,782 | 4,080,705 | 1,904,984 |
| Percentage | 37.1% | 20.9% | 9.8% |
| Swing | ▼4.8 pp | ▼4.8 pp | ▲8.0 pp |
| | Fourth party | Fifth party | Sixth party |
| Leader | Jordi Pujol | Gerardo Iglesias | Javier Rupérez |
| Party | CiU | IU | PDP |
| Leader since | 19 September 1978 | 10 December 1982 | 22 May 1987 |
| Last election | 3,329 c., 4.1% 49 p. | 2,601 c., 8.5% (Note: Results for PCE–PSUC (8.0%, 2,495 c. and 39 p.), PCC (0.4%, 61 c. and 0 p.), UPV (0.2%, 35 c. and 0 p.), PASOC (0.0%, 3 c. and 0 p.) and PSM (0.0%, 7 c. and 2 p.) in the 1983 elections.); 41 p. | 872 c., 0.9% (Note: Results for PG–CIGA in the 1983 elections.); 21 p. |
| Seats won | 4,373 c. 67 p. | 2,641 c. 47 p. | 1,521 c. 20 p. |
| Seat change | ▲1,044 c. ▲18 p. | ▲40 c. ▲6 p. | ▲649 c. ▼1 p. |
| Popular vote | 1,004,823 | 1,564,964 | 319,519 |
| Percentage | 5.2% | 8.0% | 1.6% |
| Swing | ▲1.1 pp | ▼0.5 pp | ▲0.7 pp |
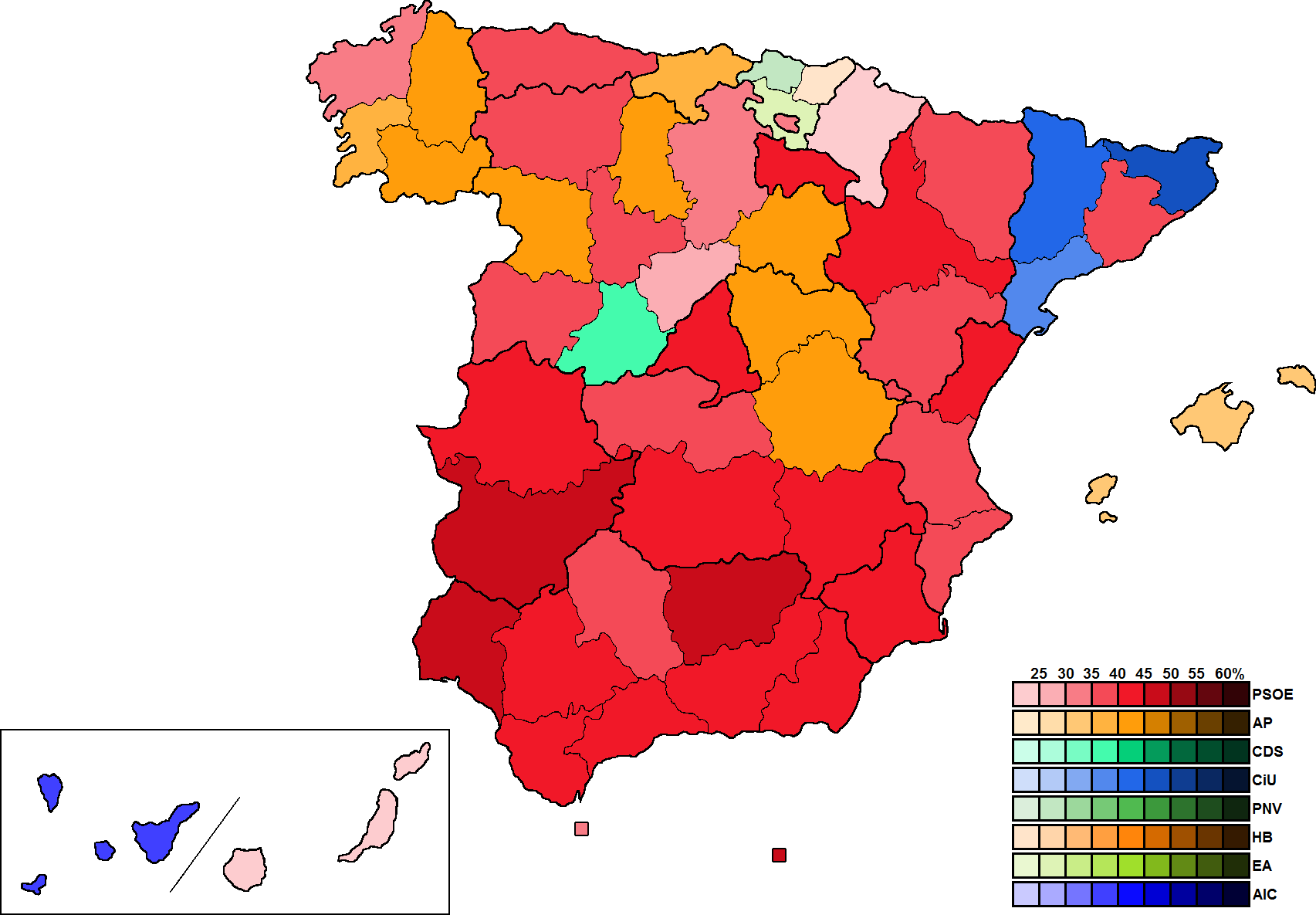
- Provincial results map for municipal elections

Local elections were held in Spain on 10 June 1987 to elect all 65,577 councillors in the 8,062 Spanish municipalities, all 1,181 provincial seats in 41 provinces (including 38 indirectly-elected provincial deputations and the three foral deputations in the Basque Country) and 196 seats in ten island councils (seven Canarian and three Balearic ones). They were held concurrently with regional elections in thirteen autonomous communities, as well as the 1987 European Parliament election.

== Overview ==
=== Local government ===
Under the 1978 Constitution, the governance of municipalities in Spain was centered on the figure of city councils (Spanish: ayuntamientos), local corporations with independent legal personality composed of a mayor, a government council and an elected legislative assembly. The mayor was indirectly elected by the local assembly, requiring an absolute majority; otherwise, the candidate from the most-voted party automatically became mayor (ties were resolved by drawing lots). The concejo abierto system (English: open council), under which voters directly elected the local mayor by plurality voting, was reserved for municipalities under 100 inhabitants and some minor local entities.

Provincial deputations were the governing bodies of provinces in Spain—except for single-province autonomous communities—having an administration role of municipal activities and composed of a provincial president, an administrative body, and a plenary. For insular provinces, such as the Balearic and Canary Islands, deputations were replaced by island councils in each of the islands or group of islands. For Gran Canaria, Tenerife, Fuerteventura, La Gomera, El Hierro, Lanzarote and La Palma, this figure was referred to in Spanish as cabildo insular, whereas for Mallorca, Menorca and Ibiza–Formentera, its name was consejo insular (Catalan: consell insular). (Note: For the Balearic Islands, regional lawmakers served as island councillors.) The three Basque provinces had foral deputations instead (called General Assemblies, or Juntas Generales).

=== Date ===
The term of local assemblies in Spain expired four years after the date of their previous election. The election decree was required to be issued no later than 25 days prior to the scheduled expiration date of the assemblies and published on the following day in the Official State Gazette (BOE), with election day taking place between 54 and 60 days after the decree's publication. The previous local elections were held on 8 May 1983, which meant that the chambers' terms would have expired on 8 May 1987. The election decree was required to be published in the BOE no later than 14 April 1987, setting the latest possible date for election day on 13 June 1987.

Local assemblies could not be dissolved before the expiration of their term, except in cases of mismanagement that seriously harmed the public interest and implied a breach of constitutional obligations, in which case the Council of Ministers could—optionally—decide to call a by-election.

Elections to the assemblies of local entities were officially called on 14 April 1987 with the publication of the corresponding decree in the BOE, setting election day for 10 June. Subsequent by-elections were called on 15 September, for 8 November.

=== Electoral system ===
Voting for local assemblies and Canarian island councils was based on universal suffrage, comprising all Spanish nationals over 18 years of age, registered and residing in the municipality or council and with full political rights (provided that they had not been deprived of the right to vote by a final sentence, nor were legally incapacitated), as well as resident non-nationals whose country of origin allowed reciprocal voting by virtue of a treaty.

Local councillors were elected using the D'Hondt method and closed-list proportional voting, with a five percent-threshold of valid votes (including blank ballots) in each constituency. Each municipality or council was a multi-member constituency, with a number of seats based on the following scale:

| Population | Councillors | | |
| Population | Municipalities | Canary Islands | Balearic Islands |
|---|---|---|---|
| <250 | 5 | No island below 5,000 inhabitants | Fixed number: Ibiza–Formentera: 13; Menorca: 13; Mallorca: 33 |
| 251–1,000 | 7 | No island below 5,000 inhabitants | Fixed number: Ibiza–Formentera: 13; Menorca: 13; Mallorca: 33 |
| 1,001–2,000 | 9 | No island below 5,000 inhabitants | Fixed number: Ibiza–Formentera: 13; Menorca: 13; Mallorca: 33 |
| 2,001–5,000 | 11 | No island below 5,000 inhabitants | Fixed number: Ibiza–Formentera: 13; Menorca: 13; Mallorca: 33 |
| 5,001–10,000 | 13 | 11 | Fixed number: Ibiza–Formentera: 13; Menorca: 13; Mallorca: 33 |
| 10,001–20,000 | 17 | 13 | Fixed number: Ibiza–Formentera: 13; Menorca: 13; Mallorca: 33 |
| 20,001–50,000 | 21 | 17 | Fixed number: Ibiza–Formentera: 13; Menorca: 13; Mallorca: 33 |
| 50,001–100,000 | 25 | 21 | Fixed number: Ibiza–Formentera: 13; Menorca: 13; Mallorca: 33 |
| >100,001 | +1 per each 100,000 inhabitants or fraction +1 if total is an even number | | Fixed number: Ibiza–Formentera: 13; Menorca: 13; Mallorca: 33 |

Councillors in municipalities between 100 and 250 inhabitants were elected using open-list partial block voting, with voters choosing up to four candidates.

Most provincial deputations were indirectly elected by applying the D'Hondt method and a three percent-threshold of valid votes to municipal results—excluding candidacies not electing any councillor—in each judicial district. Seats were allocated to provincial deputations based on the following scale (with each judicial district being assigned an initial minimum of one seat and a maximum of three-fifths of the total number of provincial seats, with the remaining ones distributed in proportion to population):

| Population | Seats |
|---|---|
| <500,000 | 25 |
| 500,001–1,000,000 | 27 |
| 1,000,001–3,500,000 | 31 |
| >3,500,001 | 51 |

The General Assemblies of Álava, Biscay and Gipuzkoa were directly elected by voters under their own, specific electoral regulations.

The law did not provide for by-elections to fill vacant seats; instead, any vacancies arising after the proclamation of candidates and during the legislative term were filled by the next candidates on the party lists or, when required, by designated substitutes.

== Parties and candidates ==
The electoral law allowed for parties and federations registered in the interior ministry, alliances and groupings of electors to present lists of candidates. Parties and federations intending to form an alliance were required to inform the relevant electoral commission within 10 days of the election call, whereas groupings of electors needed to secure the signature of a determined amount of the electors registered in the municipality for which they sought election, disallowing electors from signing for more than one list:

- At least one percent of the electors in municipalities with a population below 5,000 inhabitants, provided that the number of signers was more than double that of councillors at stake.
- At least 100 signatures in municipalities with a population between 5,001 and 10,000.
- At least 500 signatures in municipalities with a population between 10,001 and 50,000.
- At least 1,500 signatures in municipalities with a population between 50,001 and 150,000.
- At least 3,000 signatures in municipalities with a population between 150,001 and 300,000.
- At least 5,000 signatures in municipalities with a population between 300,001 and 1,000,000.
- At least 8,000 signatures in municipalities with a population over 1,000,001.

== Results ==
=== Municipal ===
==== Overall ====
← Summary of the 10 June 1987 Spanish municipal election results →
| Parties and alliances | Popular vote | | | Councillors | |
| Parties and alliances | Votes | % | ±pp | Total | +/− |
|---|---|---|---|---|---|
| Spanish Socialist Workers' Party (PSOE) | 7,229,782 | 37.08 | −4.79 | **23,241** | −488 |
| People's Alliance (AP)^{1} | 4,080,705 | 20.93 | −4.80 | **16,581** | −4,495 |
| Democratic and Social Centre (CDS)^{2} | 1,904,984 | 9.77 | +7.98 | **5,972** | +5,288 |
| United Left (IU)^{3} | 1,564,964 | 8.03 | −0.50 | **2,641** | +40 |
| Convergence and Union (CiU) | 1,004,823 | 5.15 | +1.09 | **4,373** | +1,044 |
| People's Democratic Party (PDP) | 319,519 | 1.64 | +0.74 | **1,521** | +649 |
| People's Democratic Party (PDP) | 171,083 | 0.88 | New | 914 | +914 |
| Galician Progressive Coalition (PDP–PL–CG)^{4} | 148,436 | 0.76 | −0.21 | 607 | −304 |
| Basque Nationalist Party (EAJ/PNV) | 241,832 | 1.24 | −0.93 | **819** | −503 |
| Popular Unity (HB) | 239,010 | 1.23 | +0.39 | **669** | +284 |
| Andalusian Party (PA) | 221,825 | 1.14 | +0.55 | **294** | +148 |
| Basque Solidarity (EA) | 207,054 | 1.06 | New | **497** | +497 |
| Workers' Party of Spain–Communist Unity (PTE–UC) | 185,104 | 0.95 | New | **179** | +179 |
| Valencian Union (UV) | 148,878 | 0.76 | New | **215** | +215 |
| Canarian Independent Groups (AIC) | 140,469 | 0.72 | +0.34 | **243** | +120 |
| Tenerife Group of Independents (ATI) | 119,943 | 0.62 | +0.27 | 173 | +88 |
| La Palma Group of Independents (API) | 11,356 | 0.06 | +0.05 | 46 | +37 |
| Insular Group of Gran Canaria (AIGRANC) | 4,557 | 0.02 | New | 2 | +2 |
| Lanzarote Independents Group (AIL) | 2,713 | 0.01 | ±0.00 | 16 | +4 |
| Independents of Fuerteventura (IF) | 1,900 | 0.01 | ±0.00 | 6 | −11 |
| Regionalist Aragonese Party (PAR) | 129,370 | 0.66 | +0.10 | **896** | −224 |
| Basque Country Left (EE) | 107,354 | 0.55 | +0.14 | **157** | +36 |
| Republican Left of Catalonia (ERC) | 75,422 | 0.39 | −0.06 | **188** | +33 |
| Independent Solution (SI) | 72,661 | 0.37 | New | **129** | +129 |
| Galician Nationalist Bloc (BNG) | 61,256 | 0.31 | +0.04 | **139** | +21 |
| Galician Socialist Party–Galician Left (PSG–EG)^{5} | 57,062 | 0.29 | +0.19 | **60** | +38 |
| Navarrese People's Union (UPN) | 43,818 | 0.22 | +0.04 | **134** | +55 |
| Canarian Assembly–Canarian Nationalist Left (AC–INC)^{6} | 41,390 | 0.21 | −0.03 | **40** | −11 |
| Independents of Galicia (IG) | 33,032 | 0.17 | New | **69** | +69 |
| Majorcan Union (UM) | 32,218 | 0.17 | −0.03 | **119** | −21 |
| Humanist Platform (PH–FV) | 28,489 | 0.15 | New | 0 | ±0 |
| Regionalist Party of Cantabria (PRC) | 28,227 | 0.14 | +0.07 | **100** | +37 |
| Cantonal Party (PCAN) | 26,343 | 0.14 | +0.07 | **10** | +5 |
| Independents of León (IL) | 26,108 | 0.13 | ±0.00 | **12** | +1 |
| Liberal Party (PL) | 22,416 | 0.11 | New | **62** | +62 |
| The Greens (LV) | 20,470 | 0.10 | New | **2** | +2 |
| Spanish Phalanx of the CNSO (FE–JONS) | 18,920 | 0.10 | +0.06 | **6** | −7 |
| United Extremadura (EU) | 18,483 | 0.09 | −0.03 | **112** | −90 |
| Galician Nationalist Party (PNG) | 18,354 | 0.09 | New | **38** | +38 |
| Independent Group of Ciudad Real (AICR) | 12,513 | 0.06 | New | **14** | +14 |
| Municipal Progress of Osona (PMO) | 11,877 | 0.06 | New | **48** | +48 |
| Socialist Party of Mallorca–Nationalist Left (PSM–EN)^{7} | 11,674 | 0.06 | ±0.00 | **25** | −7 |
| Confederation of the Greens (CV) | 11,385 | 0.06 | New | **1** | +1 |
| Valencian Independent Organization (OIV) | 11,385 | 0.06 | −0.03 | **25** | −38 |
| Centre Canarian Union (UCC) | 9,834 | 0.05 | New | **4** | +4 |
| Nationalist and Progressive Independent Groups (AIPN) | 9,629 | 0.05 | New | **132** | +132 |
| Valencian Electoral Coalition (CEV) | 9,352 | 0.05 | New | **17** | +17 |
| Majorera Assembly (AM) | 5,336 | 0.03 | ±0.00 | **23** | −6 |
| Free Independents (IL) | 2,674 | 0.01 | −0.01 | **4** | −2 |
| Independent Herrenian Group (AHI) | 1,441 | 0.01 | New | **9** | +9 |
| Others (lists at <0.05% not securing any provincial or island seat) | 830,682 | 4.26 | — | **5,757** | −5,019 |
| Blank ballots | 217,300 | 1.11 | +0.66 | | |
| **Total** | **19,495,424** | **100.00** | | **65,577** | **−1,735** |
| Valid votes | 19,495,424 | 98.74 | −1.15 | | |
| Invalid votes | 248,910 | 1.26 | +1.15 | | |
| **Votes cast / turnout** | **19,744,334** | **69.42** | **+0.82** | | |
| Abstentions | 8,698,014 | 30.58 | −0.82 | | |
| **Registered voters** | **28,442,348** | | | | |
Sources
Footnotes: ^{1} People's Alliance are compared to People's Coalition totals in the 1983 elections.; ^{2} Democratic and Social Centre results are compared to the combined totals of Democratic and Social Centre and Gomera Group of Independents in the 1983 elections.; ^{3} United Left results are compared to the combined totals of Communist Party of Spain, Party of the Communists of Catalonia, Valencian People's Union, Socialist Action Party and Socialist Party of Menorca in the 1983 elections.; ^{4} Galician Progressive Coalition results are compared to the combined totals of Galicianist Party–Convergence of Independents of Galicia and Independent Galician Party in the 1983 elections.; ^{5} Galician Socialist Party–Galician Left results are compared to Galician Left totals in the 1983 elections.; ^{6} Canarian Assembly–Canarian Nationalist Left results are compared to Canarian People's Union–Canarian Assembly totals in the 1983 elections.; ^{7} Socialist Party of Mallorca–Nationalist Left results are compared to Socialist Party of Mallorca–Socialist Party of the Islands totals in the 1983 elections.

Popular vote
| PSOE | 37.08% |
| AP | 20.93% |
| CDS | 9.77% |
| IU | 8.03% |
| CiU | 5.15% |
| PDP | 1.64% |
| EAJ/PNV | 1.24% |
| HB | 1.23% |
| PA | 1.14% |
| EA | 1.06% |
| PTE–UC | 0.95% |
| UV | 0.76% |
| AIC | 0.72% |
| PAR | 0.66% |
| EE | 0.55% |
| Others | 7.96% |
| Blank ballots | 1.11% |

==== City control ====
The following table lists party control in provincial capitals (highlighted in bold), as well as in municipalities above 75,000. Gains for a party are highlighted in that party's colour.

| Municipality | Population | Previous control | New control |
|---|---|---|---|
| **A Coruña** (Note: Renamed from La Coruña in February 1985.) | 239,150 | Spanish Socialist Workers' Party (PSOE) | Spanish Socialist Workers' Party (PSOE) |
| **Albacete** | 126,110 | Spanish Socialist Workers' Party (PSOE) | Spanish Socialist Workers' Party (PSOE) |
| Alcalá de Henares | 144,268 | Spanish Socialist Workers' Party (PSOE) | Spanish Socialist Workers' Party (PSOE) |
| Alcorcón | 137,884 | Spanish Socialist Workers' Party (PSOE) | Spanish Socialist Workers' Party (PSOE) |
| Algeciras | 96,882 | Spanish Socialist Workers' Party (PSOE) | Spanish Socialist Workers' Party (PSOE) |
| **Alicante** | 258,112 | Spanish Socialist Workers' Party (PSOE) | Spanish Socialist Workers' Party (PSOE) |
| **Almería** | 153,592 | Spanish Socialist Workers' Party (PSOE) | Spanish Socialist Workers' Party (PSOE) |
| **Ávila** | 43,603 | People's Alliance (AP) | Democratic and Social Centre (CDS) |
| Avilés | 86,141 | Spanish Socialist Workers' Party (PSOE) | Spanish Socialist Workers' Party (PSOE) |
| **Badajoz** | 118,852 | Spanish Socialist Workers' Party (PSOE) | Spanish Socialist Workers' Party (PSOE) |
| Badalona | 225,016 | Socialists' Party of Catalonia (PSC–PSOE) | Socialists' Party of Catalonia (PSC–PSOE) |
| Barakaldo (Note: Renamed from Baracaldo in June 1986.) | 114,094 | Spanish Socialist Workers' Party (PSOE) | Spanish Socialist Workers' Party (PSOE) |
| **Barcelona** | 1,701,812 | Socialists' Party of Catalonia (PSC–PSOE) | Socialists' Party of Catalonia (PSC–PSOE) |
| **Bilbao** | 381,506 | Basque Nationalist Party (EAJ/PNV) | Basque Nationalist Party (EAJ/PNV) |
| **Burgos** | 158,331 | Independent Solution (SI) | Independent Solution (SI) (PP in 1990) |
| **Cáceres** | 69,193 | Spanish Socialist Workers' Party (PSOE) | Spanish Socialist Workers' Party (PSOE) |
| **Cádiz** | 155,299 | Spanish Socialist Workers' Party (PSOE) | Spanish Socialist Workers' Party (PSOE) |
| Cartagena | 168,596 | Cantonal Party (PCAN) | Cantonal Party (PCAN) |
| **Castellón de la Plana** | 127,440 | Spanish Socialist Workers' Party (PSOE) | Spanish Socialist Workers' Party (PSOE) |
| **Ciudad Real** | 54,409 | Independent Group of Ciudad Real (AICR) | Independent Group of Ciudad Real (AICR) (PSOE in 1991) |
| **Córdoba** | 295,290 | United Left (IU) | United Left (IU) |
| Cornellà de Llobregat (Note: Renamed from Cornellá in April 1984.) | 86,928 | Socialists' Party of Catalonia (PSC–PSOE) | Socialists' Party of Catalonia (PSC–PSOE) |
| **Cuenca** | 41,034 | People's Democratic Party (PDP) | People's Alliance (AP) |
| **Donostia-San Sebastián** | 171,885 | Basque Nationalist Party (EAJ/PNV) | Basque Solidarity (EA) |
| Elche | 175,649 | Spanish Socialist Workers' Party (PSOE) | Spanish Socialist Workers' Party (PSOE) |
| Ferrol (Note: Renamed from El Ferrol del Caudillo in February 1985.) | 86,154 | Spanish Socialist Workers' Party (PSOE) | People's Alliance (AP) (PSOE in 1989) |
| Fuenlabrada | 119,848 | Spanish Socialist Workers' Party (PSOE) | Spanish Socialist Workers' Party (PSOE) |
| Getafe | 131,840 | Spanish Socialist Workers' Party (PSOE) | Spanish Socialist Workers' Party (PSOE) |
| Getxo | 77,856 | Basque Nationalist Party (EAJ/PNV) | Basque Nationalist Party (EAJ/PNV) |
| Gijón | 258,291 | Spanish Socialist Workers' Party (PSOE) | Spanish Socialist Workers' Party (PSOE) |
| **Girona** (Note: Renamed from Gerona in April 1984.) | 67,009 | Socialists' Party of Catalonia (PSC–PSOE) | Socialists' Party of Catalonia (PSC–PSOE) |
| **Granada** | 256,073 | Spanish Socialist Workers' Party (PSOE) | Spanish Socialist Workers' Party (PSOE) |
| **Guadalajara** | 59,080 | Spanish Socialist Workers' Party (PSOE) | Spanish Socialist Workers' Party (PSOE) |
| **Huelva** | 135,210 | Spanish Socialist Workers' Party (PSOE) | Spanish Socialist Workers' Party (PSOE) |
| **Huesca** | 40,736 | Spanish Socialist Workers' Party (PSOE) | Spanish Socialist Workers' Party (PSOE) |
| **Jaén** | 102,933 | Spanish Socialist Workers' Party (PSOE) | Spanish Socialist Workers' Party (PSOE) (AP in 1989) |
| Jerez de la Frontera | 179,191 | Andalusian Party (PA) | Andalusian Party (PA) |
| L'Hospitalet de Llobregat (Note: Renamed from Hospitalet in April 1984.) | 279,779 | Socialists' Party of Catalonia (PSC–PSOE) | Socialists' Party of Catalonia (PSC–PSOE) |
| La Laguna | 107,593 | Spanish Socialist Workers' Party (PSOE) | Canarian Independent Groups (AIC) |
| **Las Palmas de Gran Canaria** | 356,911 | Spanish Socialist Workers' Party (PSOE) | Democratic and Social Centre (CDS) (PSOE in 1990) |
| Leganés | 167,783 | Spanish Socialist Workers' Party (PSOE) | Spanish Socialist Workers' Party (PSOE) |
| **León** | 134,641 | Independents of León (IL) | People's Alliance (AP) |
| **Lleida** (Note: Renamed from Lérida in April 1984.) | 107,749 | Socialists' Party of Catalonia (PSC–PSOE) | Convergence and Union (CiU) (PSC–PSOE in 1989) |
| **Logroño** | 115,622 | Spanish Socialist Workers' Party (PSOE) | Spanish Socialist Workers' Party (PSOE) |
| **Lugo** | 75,623 | Galician Progressive Coalition (PDP–PL–CG) | Galician Progressive Coalition (PDP–PL–CG) |
| **Madrid** | 3,058,182 | Spanish Socialist Workers' Party (PSOE) | Spanish Socialist Workers' Party (PSOE) (CDS in 1989) |
| **Málaga** | 563,332 | Spanish Socialist Workers' Party (PSOE) | Spanish Socialist Workers' Party (PSOE) |
| Marbella | 74,807 (Note: Reached 75,000 in 1987.) | Spanish Socialist Workers' Party (PSOE) | Spanish Socialist Workers' Party (PSOE) |
| Mataró | 100,021 | Socialists' Party of Catalonia (PSC–PSOE) | Socialists' Party of Catalonia (PSC–PSOE) |
| Móstoles | 175,233 | Spanish Socialist Workers' Party (PSOE) | Spanish Socialist Workers' Party (PSOE) |
| **Murcia** | 303,257 | Spanish Socialist Workers' Party (PSOE) | Spanish Socialist Workers' Party (PSOE) |
| **Ourense** (Note: Renamed from Orense in October 1984.) | 100,143 | People's Alliance (AP) | People's Alliance (AP) (PSOE in 1987; IG in 1990) |
| **Oviedo** | 185,864 | Spanish Socialist Workers' Party (PSOE) | Spanish Socialist Workers' Party (PSOE) |
| **Palencia** | 75,403 | People's Alliance (AP) | People's Alliance (AP) |
| **Palma** | 295,136 | Spanish Socialist Workers' Party (PSOE) | Spanish Socialist Workers' Party (PSOE) |
| **Pamplona** | 178,439 | Spanish Socialist Workers' Party (PSOE) | Navarrese People's Union (UPN) |
| **Pontevedra** | 67,289 | Independents of Galicia (IG) | Independents of Galicia (IG) |
| Reus | 81,145 | Socialists' Party of Catalonia (PSC–PSOE) | Socialists' Party of Catalonia (PSC–PSOE) |
| Sabadell | 186,115 | Initiative for Catalonia (IC) | Initiative for Catalonia (IC) |
| **Salamanca** | 152,833 | Spanish Socialist Workers' Party (PSOE) | People's Alliance (AP) |
| San Fernando | 80,057 | Spanish Socialist Workers' Party (PSOE) | Spanish Socialist Workers' Party (PSOE) (PA in 1989) |
| Sant Boi de Llobregat | 75,789 | Socialists' Party of Catalonia (PSC–PSOE) | Socialists' Party of Catalonia (PSC–PSOE) |
| Santa Coloma de Gramenet (Note: Renamed from Santa Coloma de Gramanet in April 1984.) | 135,258 | Initiative for Catalonia (IC) | Initiative for Catalonia (IC) |
| **Santa Cruz de Tenerife** | 211,209 | Canarian Independent Groups (AIC) | Canarian Independent Groups (AIC) |
| **Santander** | 186,145 | People's Alliance (AP) | People's Alliance (AP) |
| Santiago de Compostela | 86,250 | People's Alliance (AP) | Spanish Socialist Workers' Party (PSOE) |
| **Segovia** | 53,397 | People's Democratic Party (PDP) | Democratic and Social Centre (CDS) |
| **Seville** | 651,084 | Spanish Socialist Workers' Party (PSOE) | Spanish Socialist Workers' Party (PSOE) |
| **Soria** | 31,144 | Liberal Party (PL) | People's Alliance (AP) |
| **Tarragona** | 106,495 | Socialists' Party of Catalonia (PSC–PSOE) | Socialists' Party of Catalonia (PSC–PSOE) (CiU in 1989) |
| Telde | 73,913 (Note: Reached 75,000 in 1987.) | Canarian Assembly (AC) | United Left (IU) |
| Terrassa (Note: Renamed from Tarrasa in April 1984.) | 160,105 | Socialists' Party of Catalonia (PSC–PSOE) | Socialists' Party of Catalonia (PSC–PSOE) |
| **Teruel** | 27,226 | Regionalist Aragonese Party (PAR) | Spanish Socialist Workers' Party (PSOE) |
| **Toledo** | 58,198 | Spanish Socialist Workers' Party (PSOE) | People's Alliance (AP) |
| Torrejón de Ardoz | 80,066 | Spanish Socialist Workers' Party (PSOE) | Spanish Socialist Workers' Party (PSOE) |
| **Valencia** | 729,419 | Spanish Socialist Workers' Party (PSOE) | Spanish Socialist Workers' Party (PSOE) |
| **Valladolid** | 327,452 | Spanish Socialist Workers' Party (PSOE) | Spanish Socialist Workers' Party (PSOE) |
| Vigo | 261,878 | Spanish Socialist Workers' Party (PSOE) | Spanish Socialist Workers' Party (PSOE) |
| **Vitoria-Gasteiz** | 199,449 | Basque Solidarity (EA) | Basque Solidarity (EA) (PNV in 1990) |
| **Zamora** | 60,364 | Spanish Socialist Workers' Party (PSOE) | People's Alliance (AP) |
| **Zaragoza** | 573,662 | Spanish Socialist Workers' Party (PSOE) | Spanish Socialist Workers' Party (PSOE) |

=== Provincial and island ===
==== Summary ====
← Summary of the 10 June 1987 Spanish provincial and island election results →
| Parties and alliances | Seats | | | | |
| Parties and alliances | PD | IC | FD | Total | +/− |
|---|---|---|---|---|---|
| Spanish Socialist Workers' Party (PSOE) | 489 | 67 | 32 | **588** | −50 |
| People's Alliance (AP)^{1} | 292 | 38 | 6 | **336** | −83 |
| Democratic and Social Centre (CDS)^{2} | 77 | 35 | 4 | **116** | +93 |
| Convergence and Union (CiU) | 67 | — | — | **67** | +18 |
| United Left (IU)^{3} | 40 | 7 | 0 | **47** | +6 |
| Basque Solidarity (EA) | — | — | 35 | **35** | +35 |
| Basque Nationalist Party (EAJ/PNV) | — | — | 32 | **32** | −42 |
| Popular Unity (HB) | — | — | 32 | **32** | +12 |
| People's Democratic Party (PDP) | 20 | 0 | 0 | **20** | −1 |
| Galician Progressive Coalition (PDP–PL–CG)^{4} | 13 | — | — | 13 | −8 |
| People's Democratic Party (PDP) | 7 | 0 | 0 | 7 | +7 |
| Regionalist Aragonese Party (PAR) | 13 | — | — | **13** | +1 |
| Canarian Independent Groups (AIC) | — | 24 | — | **24** | +13 |
| Tenerife Group of Independents (ATI) | — | 13 | — | 13 | +7 |
| La Palma Group of Independents (API) | — | 5 | — | 5 | +5 |
| Independents of Fuerteventura (IF) | — | 4 | — | 4 | −1 |
| Lanzarote Independents Group (AIL) | — | 2 | — | 2 | +2 |
| Basque Country Left (EE) | — | — | 12 | **12** | +6 |
| Andalusian Party (PA) | 9 | — | — | **9** | +5 |
| Independent Herrenian Group (AHI) | — | 8 | — | **8** | +2 |
| Majorera Assembly (AM) | — | 7 | — | **7** | −2 |
| Independent Solution (SI) | 6 | — | — | **6** | +6 |
| Majorcan Union (UM) | — | 4 | — | **4** | −2 |
| Valencian Union (UV) | 3 | — | — | **3** | +3 |
| Canarian Assembly–Canarian Nationalist Left (AC–INC)^{5} | — | 3 | — | **3** | −1 |
| Independents of León (IL) | 3 | — | — | **3** | +1 |
| Socialist Party of Mallorca–Nationalist Left (PSM–EN) | — | 2 | — | **2** | ±0 |
| Workers' Party of Spain–Communist Unity (PTE–UC) | 1 | 0 | 0 | **1** | +1 |
| Galician Nationalist Bloc (BNG) | 1 | — | — | **1** | ±0 |
| Galician Socialist Party–Galician Left (PSG–EG) | 1 | — | — | **1** | +1 |
| Independents of Galicia (IG) | 1 | — | — | **1** | +1 |
| Galician Nationalist Party (PNG) | 1 | — | — | **1** | +1 |
| Independent Group of Ciudad Real (AICR) | 1 | — | — | **1** | +1 |
| Centre Canarian Union (UCC) | — | 1 | — | **1** | +1 |
| Free Independents (IL) | 1 | — | — | **1** | ±0 |
| United Extremadura (EU) | 0 | — | — | 0 | −1 |
| Liberal Democratic Party (PDL) | n/a | n/a | n/a | 0 | −6 |
| Group of Independent Electors (ADEI) | n/a | n/a | n/a | 0 | −3 |
| Independent Provincial Group of Ciudad Real (APICR) | n/a | n/a | n/a | 0 | −2 |
| United La Coruña (LCU) | n/a | n/a | n/a | 0 | −1 |
| Agrarian Bloc–Spanish Ruralist Party (BAR–PRE) | n/a | n/a | n/a | 0 | −1 |
| Menorcan Independent Candidacy (CIM) | n/a | n/a | n/a | 0 | −1 |
| Independents (INDEP) | 2 | 0 | 0 | **2** | −2 |
| **Total** | **1,028** | **196** | **153** | **1,377** | **+9** |
Sources
Footnotes: ^{1} People's Alliance results are compared to People's Coalition totals in the 1983 elections.; ^{2} Democratic and Social Centre results are compared to the combined totals of Democratic and Social Centre and Gomera Group of Independents in the 1983 elections.; ^{3} United Left results are compared to the combined totals of Communist Party of Spain and Socialist Party of Menorca in the 1983 elections.; ^{4} Galician Progressive Coalition results are compared to Galicianist Party–Convergence of Independents of Galicia totals in the 1983 elections.; ^{5} Canarian Assembly–Canarian Nationalist Left results are compared to Canarian People's Union–Canarian Assembly totals in the 1983 elections.

==== Indirectly-elected ====
The following table lists party control in the indirectly-elected provincial deputations. Gains for a party are highlighted in that party's colour.

| Province | Population | Previous control | New control |
|---|---|---|---|
| Albacete | 346,217 | Spanish Socialist Workers' Party (PSOE) | Spanish Socialist Workers' Party (PSOE) |
| Alicante | 1,217,279 | Spanish Socialist Workers' Party (PSOE) | Spanish Socialist Workers' Party (PSOE) |
| Almería | 442,324 | Spanish Socialist Workers' Party (PSOE) | Spanish Socialist Workers' Party (PSOE) |
| Ávila | 181,917 | People's Alliance (AP) | Democratic and Social Centre (CDS) |
| Badajoz | 666,053 | Spanish Socialist Workers' Party (PSOE) | Spanish Socialist Workers' Party (PSOE) |
| Barcelona | 4,614,364 | Socialists' Party of Catalonia (PSC–PSOE) | Socialists' Party of Catalonia (PSC–PSOE) |
| Burgos | 359,242 | People's Alliance (AP) | People's Alliance (AP) |
| Cáceres | 420,367 | Spanish Socialist Workers' Party (PSOE) | Spanish Socialist Workers' Party (PSOE) |
| Cádiz | 1,044,493 | Spanish Socialist Workers' Party (PSOE) | Spanish Socialist Workers' Party (PSOE) |
| Castellón | 436,588 | Spanish Socialist Workers' Party (PSOE) | Spanish Socialist Workers' Party (PSOE) |
| Ciudad Real | 483,634 | Spanish Socialist Workers' Party (PSOE) | Spanish Socialist Workers' Party (PSOE) |
| Córdoba | 747,505 | Spanish Socialist Workers' Party (PSOE) | Spanish Socialist Workers' Party (PSOE) |
| Cuenca | 213,359 | People's Alliance (AP) | Spanish Socialist Workers' Party (PSOE) |
| Gerona | 488,342 | Convergence and Union (CiU) | Convergence and Union (CiU) |
| Granada | 783,265 | Independent (INDEP) | Spanish Socialist Workers' Party (PSOE) |
| Guadalajara | 146,311 | People's Alliance (AP) | People's Alliance (AP) |
| Huelva | 433,995 | Spanish Socialist Workers' Party (PSOE) | Spanish Socialist Workers' Party (PSOE) |
| Huesca | 210,094 | Spanish Socialist Workers' Party (PSOE) | Spanish Socialist Workers' Party (PSOE) |
| Jaén | 646,849 | Spanish Socialist Workers' Party (PSOE) | Spanish Socialist Workers' Party (PSOE) |
| La Coruña | 1,109,788 | People's Alliance (AP) | People's Alliance (AP) (PSOE in 1989) |
| León | 530,983 | Spanish Socialist Workers' Party (PSOE) | Spanish Socialist Workers' Party (PSOE) |
| Lérida | 352,049 | Socialists' Party of Catalonia (PSC–PSOE) | Convergence and Union (CiU) |
| Lugo | 404,888 | People's Alliance (AP) | People's Alliance (AP) |
| Málaga | 1,150,434 | Spanish Socialist Workers' Party (PSOE) | Spanish Socialist Workers' Party (PSOE) |
| Orense | 429,382 | Centrists of Galicia (CdG) | Centrists of Galicia (CdG) |
| Palencia | 189,433 | People's Alliance (AP) | People's Alliance (AP) |
| Pontevedra | 900,414 | People's Alliance (AP) | People's Alliance (AP) |
| Salamanca | 359,285 | Spanish Socialist Workers' Party (PSOE) | Spanish Socialist Workers' Party (PSOE) (CDS in 1988) |
| Segovia | 150,634 | People's Democratic Party (PDP) | Spanish Socialist Workers' Party (PSOE) |
| Seville | 1,540,907 | Spanish Socialist Workers' Party (PSOE) | Spanish Socialist Workers' Party (PSOE) |
| Soria | 97,734 | People's Alliance (AP) | People's Alliance (AP) |
| Tarragona | 523,883 | Convergence and Union (CiU) | Convergence and Union (CiU) |
| Teruel | 149,423 | Spanish Socialist Workers' Party (PSOE) | Spanish Socialist Workers' Party (PSOE) |
| Toledo | 486,194 | People's Alliance (AP) | People's Alliance (AP) |
| Valencia | 2,078,815 | Spanish Socialist Workers' Party (PSOE) | Spanish Socialist Workers' Party (PSOE) |
| Valladolid | 491,093 | Spanish Socialist Workers' Party (PSOE) | Democratic and Social Centre (CDS) (AP in 1990) |
| Zamora | 222,006 | People's Alliance (AP) | People's Alliance (AP) |
| Zaragoza | 824,778 | Spanish Socialist Workers' Party (PSOE) | Spanish Socialist Workers' Party (PSOE) |

==== Island councils ====
The following table lists party control in the island councils. Gains for a party are highlighted in that party's colour.

| Island | Population | Previous control | New control |
|---|---|---|---|
| El Hierro | 7,191 | Independent Herrenian Group (AHI) | Independent Herrenian Group (AHI) |
| Fuerteventura | 31,892 | Majorera Assembly (AM) | Majorera Assembly (AM) |
| Gran Canaria | 662,476 | Spanish Socialist Workers' Party (PSOE) | Spanish Socialist Workers' Party (PSOE) |
| Ibiza–Formentera | 69,748 | People's Alliance (AP) | People's Alliance (AP) |
| La Gomera | 17,239 | Gomera Group of Independents (AGI) | Spanish Socialist Workers' Party (PSOE) |
| La Palma | 79,729 | People's Alliance (AP) | People's Alliance (AP) |
| Lanzarote | 56,901 | Spanish Socialist Workers' Party (PSOE) | Democratic and Social Centre (CDS) |
| Mallorca | 551,129 | Majorcan Union (UM) | People's Alliance (AP) |
| Menorca | 60,056 | Spanish Socialist Workers' Party (PSOE) | Spanish Socialist Workers' Party (PSOE) |
| Tenerife | 610,963 | Spanish Socialist Workers' Party (PSOE) | Tenerife Group of Independents (ATI) |

==== Foral deputations ====
The following table lists party control in the foral deputations. Gains for a party are highlighted in that party's colour.

| Province | Population | Previous control | New control |
|---|---|---|---|
| Álava | 267,728 | Basque Nationalist Party (EAJ/PNV) | Spanish Socialist Workers' Party (PSOE) |
| Biscay | 1,179,150 | Basque Nationalist Party (EAJ/PNV) | Basque Nationalist Party (EAJ/PNV) |
| Guipúzcoa | 689,222 | Basque Solidarity (EA) | Basque Solidarity (EA) |

== Bibliography ==
- Constitución Española (Constitution). Official State Gazette (in Spanish). 27 December 1978 [version as of 29 December 1978]. BOE-A-1978-31229.
- Ley Orgánica 10/1982, de 10 de agosto, de Estatuto de Autonomía de Canarias (Organic Law 10/1982). Official State Gazette (in Spanish). 10 August 1982 [version as of 16 August 1982]. BOE-A-1982-20821.
- Ley Orgánica 2/1983, de 25 de febrero, de Estatuto de Autonomía para las islas Baleares (Organic Law 2/1983). Official State Gazette (in Spanish). 1 March 1983. BOE-A-1983-6316.
- Ley 27/1983, de 25 de noviembre, de Relaciones entre las Instituciones Comunes de la Comunidad Autónoma y los Órganos Forales de sus Territorios Históricos (Law 27/1983). Official State Gazette (in Spanish). 25 November 1983 [version as of 10 April 1987]. BOE-A-2012-5193.
- Ley 7/1985, de 2 de abril, Reguladora de las Bases del Régimen Local (Law 7/1985). Official State Gazette (in Spanish). 2 April 1985 [version as of 3 April 1985]. BOE-A-1985-5392.
- Ley Orgánica 5/1985, de 19 de junio, del Régimen Electoral General (Organic Law 5/1985). Official State Gazette (in Spanish). 19 June 1985 [version as of 3 April 1987]. BOE-A-1985-11672.
- Ley 8/1986, de 18 de noviembre, de Régimen Jurídico de las Administraciones Públicas de Canarias (Law 8/1986). Official State Gazette (in Spanish). 18 November 1986. BOE-A-1986-33111.
- Ley 8/1986, de 26 de noviembre, Electoral de la Comunidad Autónoma de las Islas Baleares (Law 8/1986). Official State Gazette (in Spanish). 26 November 1986 [version as of 20 December 1986]. BOE-A-1987-2903.
- Ley 1/1987, de 27 de marzo, de Elecciones para las Juntas Generales de los Territorios Históricos de Araba, Bizkaia y Gipuzkoa (Law 1/1987). Official State Gazette (in Spanish). 27 March 1987 [version as of 10 April 1987]. BOE-A-2012-3948.
- Real Decreto 508/1987, de 13 de abril, de convocatoria de elecciones locales (Royal Decree 508/1987). Official State Gazette (in Spanish). 13 April 1987. BOE-A-1987-9222.
- Real Decreto 1121/1987, de 11 de septiembre, por el que se convocan elecciones locales parciales (Royal Decree 1121/1987). Official State Gazette (in Spanish). 11 September 1987. BOE-A-1987-21393.
