= 1991 Canarian island council elections =

Elections in the Spanish region of the Canary Islands

Island council elections were held in the Canary Islands on 26 May 1991 to elect the 4th Island Councils (the cabildos insulares) of El Hierro, Fuerteventura, Gran Canaria, La Gomera, La Palma, Lanzarote and Tenerife. All 139 seats in the seven island councils were up for election. They were held concurrently with regional elections in thirteen autonomous communities (including the Canary Islands) and local elections all across Spain.

== Overall ==
← Summary of the 26 May 1991 Canarian island council election results →
Parties and alliances	Popular vote			Seats	
Parties and alliances	Votes	%	±pp	Total	+/−
Spanish Socialist Workers' Party (PSOE)	236,671	33.97	+4.40	51	+5
Canarian Independent Groups (AIC)	169,563	24.34	+4.73	35	+11
Tenerife Group of Independents (ATI)	122,029	17.52	+0.19	13	±0
Independents of Gran Canaria (IGC)	15,573	2.24	New	0	±0
Lanzarote Independents Party (PIL)^{1}	15,096	2.17	+1.83	12	+10
La Palma Group of Independents (API)	13,492	1.94	+0.54	7	+2
Independents of Fuerteventura (IF)	3,373	0.48	−0.05	3	−1
People's Party (PP)^{2}	91,203	13.09	−0.71	14	+1
Democratic and Social Centre (CDS)	83,237	11.95	−5.61	18	−12
Canarian Initiative (ICAN)^{3}	82,539	11.85	−0.33	10	+2
Canarian Nationalist Party (PNC)	7,571	1.09	New	0	±0
Majorera Assembly (AM)	6,533	0.94	+0.10	7	±0
Canarian Coalition for Independence (CI (FREPIC–Awañac))	3,558	0.51	New	0	±0
The Greens (LV)	2,291	0.33	New	0	±0
Independent Herrenian Group (AHI)	1,553	0.22	−0.17	4	−4
Party of The People (LG)	1,406	0.20	New	0	±0
The Greens Ecologist–Humanist List (LVLE–H)^{4}	1,222	0.18	+0.07	0	±0
Workers' Socialist Party (PST)	1,219	0.17	−0.01	0	±0
Left Platform (PCE (m–l)–CRPE)^{5}	1,172	0.17	+0.10	0	±0
Insular Group of Gran Canaria (AIGRANC)	1,041	0.15	−0.60	0	±0
Assembly (Tagoror)	713	0.10	+0.02	0	±0
Gomeran People's Union (UPGO)	45	0.01	−0.01	0	±0
Centre Canarian Union (UCC)	n/a	n/a	−2.49	0	−1
Blank ballots	5,145	0.74	+0.12		
Total	696,682			139	+2
Valid votes	696,682	99.27	+0.43		
Invalid votes	5,143	0.73	−0.43		
Votes cast / turnout	701,825	61.86	−5.32		
Abstentions	432,765	38.14	+5.32		
Registered voters	1,134,590				
Sources
Footnotes: ^{1} Lanzarote Independents Party results are compared to Lanzarote Independents Group totals in the 1987 elections.; ^{2} People's Party results are compared to the combined totals of People's Alliance and People's Democratic Party–Canarian Centrists in the 1987 elections.; ^{3} Canarian Initiative results are compared to the combined totals of United Canarian Left, Canarian Assembly–Canarian Nationalist Left and Union of Left Nationalists in the 1987 elections.; ^{4} The Greens Ecologist–Humanist List results are compared to Humanist Platform totals in the 1987 elections.; ^{5} Left Platform results are compared to Republican Popular Unity totals in the 1987 elections.

Popular vote
PSOE	33.97%
AIC	24.34%
PP	13.09%
CDS	11.95%
ICAN	11.85%
PNC	1.09%
AM	0.94%
AHI	0.22%
Others	1.82%
Blank ballots	0.74%

Seats
PSOE	36.69%
AIC	25.18%
CDS	12.95%
PP	10.07%
ICAN	7.19%
AM	5.04%
AHI	2.88%

== Island control ==
The following table lists party control in the island councils. Gains for a party are highlighted in that party's colour.

Island	Population	Previous control	New control
El Hierro	7,705	Independent Herrenian Group (AHI)	Spanish Socialist Workers' Party (PSOE)
Fuerteventura	40,012	Majorera Assembly (AM)	Majorera Assembly (AM)
Gran Canaria	704,757	Spanish Socialist Workers' Party (PSOE)	Canarian Initiative (ICAN)
La Gomera	17,485	Spanish Socialist Workers' Party (PSOE)	Spanish Socialist Workers' Party (PSOE)
La Palma	82,131	People's Party (PP)	La Palma Group of Independents (API) (PSOE in 1993)
Lanzarote	74,007	Democratic and Social Centre (CDS)	Lanzarote Independents Party (PIL) (PSOE in 1994)
Tenerife	663,306	Tenerife Group of Independents (ATI)	Tenerife Group of Independents (ATI)

== Islands ==
=== El Hierro ===
← Summary of the 26 May 1991 Island Council of El Hierro election results →
Parties and alliances	Popular vote			Seats	
Parties and alliances	Votes	%	±pp	Total	+/−
Independent Herrenian Group (AHI)	1,553	36.52	−28.53	4	−4
Spanish Socialist Workers' Party (PSOE)	1,362	32.03	+11.01	4	+2
People's Party (PP)^{1}	851	20.01	+11.61	2	+1
Canarian Initiative (ICAN)	478	11.24	New	1	+1
Blank ballots	8	0.19	−0.24		
Total	4,252			11	±0
Valid votes	4,252	99.67	+0.05		
Invalid votes	14	0.33	−0.05		
Votes cast / turnout	4,266	74.82	−1.99		
Abstentions	1,436	25.18	+1.99		
Registered voters	5,702				
Sources
Footnotes: ^{1} People's Party results are compared to People's Alliance totals in the 1987 election.

=== Fuerteventura ===
← Summary of the 26 May 1991 Island Council of Fuerteventura election results →
Parties and alliances	Popular vote			Seats	
Parties and alliances	Votes	%	±pp	Total	+/−
Majorera Assembly (AM)	6,533	35.99	−0.93	7	±0
Spanish Socialist Workers' Party (PSOE)	3,905	21.51	+9.93	4	+2
Independents of Fuerteventura (IF)	3,373	18.58	−4.83	3	−1
Democratic and Social Centre (CDS)	3,357	18.49	−2.19	3	−1
People's Party (PP)^{1}	871	4.80	+0.20	0	±0
Blank ballots	113	0.62	−0.03		
Total	18,152			17	±0
Valid votes	18,152	99.38	+0.05		
Invalid votes	113	0.62	−0.05		
Votes cast / turnout	18,265	69.62	−5.10		
Abstentions	7,970	30.38	+5.10		
Registered voters	26,235				
Sources
Footnotes: ^{1} People's Party results are compared to People's Alliance totals in the 1987 election.

=== Gran Canaria ===
← Summary of the 26 May 1991 Island Council of Gran Canaria election results →
Parties and alliances	Popular vote			Seats	
Parties and alliances	Votes	%	±pp	Total	+/−
Spanish Socialist Workers' Party (PSOE)	111,829	35.48	+8.12	12	+3
Democratic and Social Centre (CDS)	59,228	18.79	−3.98	6	−1
People's Party (PP)^{1}	58,206	18.47	−2.30	6	+1
Canarian Initiative (ICAN)^{2}	54,892	17.42	−0.86	5	±0
Independents of Gran Canaria (IGC)	15,573	4.94	New	0	±0
Canarian Nationalist Party (PNC)	4,621	1.47	New	0	±0
The Greens (LV)	2,291	0.73	New	0	±0
Canarian Coalition for Independence (CI (FREPIC–Awañac))	1,328	0.42	New	0	±0
The Greens Ecologist–Humanist List (LVLE–H)^{3}	1,222	0.39	+0.15	0	±0
Left Platform (PCE (m–l)–CRPE)^{4}	1,172	0.37	+0.21	0	±0
Insular Group of Gran Canaria (AIGRANC)	1,041	0.33	−1.37	0	±0
Assembly (Tagoror)	713	0.23	+0.06	0	±0
Party of The People (LG)	603	0.19	New	0	±0
Centre Canarian Union (UCC)	n/a	n/a	−5.63	0	−1
Blank ballots	2,451	0.78	+0.05		
Total	315,170			29	+2
Valid votes	315,170	99.22	+0.73		
Invalid votes	2,493	0.78	−0.73		
Votes cast / turnout	317,663	62.63	−2.61		
Abstentions	189,573	37.37	+2.61		
Registered voters	507,236				
Sources
Footnotes: ^{1} People's Party results are compared to the combined totals of People's Alliance and People's Democratic Party–Canarian Centrists in the 1987 election.; ^{2} Canarian Initiative results are compared to the combined totals of United Canarian Left and Canarian Assembly–Canarian Nationalist Left in the 1987 election.; ^{3} The Greens Ecologist–Humanist List results are compared to Humanist Platform totals in the 1987 election.; ^{4} Left Platform results are compared to Republican Popular Unity totals in the 1987 election.

=== La Gomera ===
← Summary of the 26 May 1991 Island Council of La Gomera election results →
Parties and alliances	Popular vote			Seats	
Parties and alliances	Votes	%	±pp	Total	+/−
Spanish Socialist Workers' Party (PSOE)	5,399	57.13	+0.78	8	±0
Democratic and Social Centre–Gomera Group of Independents (CDS–AGI)	3,097	32.77	+2.18	5	+1
Canarian Initiative (ICAN)^{1}	567	6.00	−0.38	0	−1
People's Party (PP)^{2}	302	3.20	−1.25	0	±0
Gomeran People's Union (UPGO)	45	0.48	−1.35	0	±0
Blank ballots	40	0.42	+0.03		
Total	9,450			13	±0
Valid votes	9,450	99.73	+0.27		
Invalid votes	26	0.27	−0.27		
Votes cast / turnout	9,476	71.27	−0.71		
Abstentions	3,819	28.73	+0.71		
Registered voters	13,295				
Sources
Footnotes: ^{1} Canarian Initiative results are compared to United Canarian Left totals in the 1987 election.; ^{2} People's Party results are compared to People's Alliance totals in the 1987 election.

=== La Palma ===
← Summary of the 26 May 1991 Island Council of La Palma election results →
Parties and alliances	Popular vote			Seats	
Parties and alliances	Votes	%	±pp	Total	+/−
La Palma Group of Independents (API)	13,492	33.08	+8.67	7	+2
Spanish Socialist Workers' Party (PSOE)	13,390	32.83	+6.33	7	+1
People's Party (PP)^{1}	7,701	18.88	−7.74	4	−2
Canarian Initiative (ICAN)^{2}	3,912	9.59	+0.06	2	±0
Democratic and Social Centre (CDS)	2,165	5.31	−7.20	1	−1
Blank ballots	122	0.30	−0.13		
Total	40,782			21	±0
Valid votes	40,782	99.45	−0.15		
Invalid votes	225	0.55	+0.15		
Votes cast / turnout	41,007	67.41	+0.49		
Abstentions	19,828	32.59	−0.49		
Registered voters	60,835				
Sources
Footnotes: ^{1} People's Party results are compared to People's Alliance totals in the 1987 election.; ^{2} Canarian Initiative results are compared to United Canarian Left totals in the 1987 election.

=== Lanzarote ===
← Summary of the 26 May 1991 Island Council of Lanzarote election results →
Parties and alliances	Popular vote			Seats	
Parties and alliances	Votes	%	±pp	Total	+/−
Lanzarote Independents Party (PIL)^{1}	15,096	48.79	+39.84	12	+10
Spanish Socialist Workers' Party (PSOE)	8,438	27.27	−6.69	6	−3
Democratic and Social Centre (CDS)	4,549	14.70	−23.14	3	−7
People's Party (PP)^{2}	1,036	3.35	+0.10	0	±0
Canarian Initiative (ICAN)^{3}	964	3.12	−4.00	0	±0
Canarian Nationalist Party (PNC)	404	1.31	New	0	±0
Canarian Coalition for Independence (CI (FREPIC–Awañac))	307	0.99	New	0	±0
Blank ballots	145	0.47	−0.19		
Total	30,939			21	±0
Valid votes	30,939	99.63	+0.79		
Invalid votes	115	0.37	−0.79		
Votes cast / turnout	31,054	58.51	−7.84		
Abstentions	22,019	41.49	+7.84		
Registered voters	53,073				
Sources
Footnotes: ^{1} Lanzarote Independents Party results are compared to Lanzarote Independents Group totals in the 1987 elections.; ^{2} People's Party results are compared to the combined totals of People's Democratic Party–Canarian Centrists and People's Alliance in the 1987 election.; ^{3} Canarian Initiative results are compared to the combined totals of United Canarian Left and Canarian Assembly–Canarian Nationalist Left in the 1987 election.

=== Tenerife ===
← Summary of the 26 May 1991 Island Council of Tenerife election results →
Parties and alliances	Popular vote			Seats	
Parties and alliances	Votes	%	±pp	Total	+/−
Tenerife Group of Independents (ATI)	122,029	43.91	+2.83	13	±0
Spanish Socialist Workers' Party (PSOE)	92,348	33.23	+1.07	10	±0
People's Party (PP)^{1}	22,236	8.00	+1.78	2	+1
Canarian Initiative (ICAN)^{2}	21,726	7.82	+0.92	2	+2
Democratic and Social Centre (CDS)	10,841	3.90	−6.67	0	−3
Canarian Nationalist Party (PNC)	2,546	0.92	New	0	±0
Canarian Coalition for Independence (CI (FREPIC–Awañac))	1,923	0.69	+0.30	0	±0
Workers' Socialist Party (PST)	1,219	0.44	+0.02	0	±0
Party of The People (LG)	803	0.29	New	0	±0
Blank ballots	2,266	0.82	+0.27		
Total	277,937			27	±0
Valid votes	277,937	99.23	+0.19		
Invalid votes	2,157	0.77	−0.19		
Votes cast / turnout	280,094	59.82	−8.98		
Abstentions	188,120	40.18	+8.98		
Registered voters	468,214				
Sources
Footnotes: ^{1} People's Party results are compared to People's Alliance totals in the 1987 election.; ^{2} Canarian Initiative results are compared to the combined totals of United Canarian Left and Canarian Assembly–Canarian Nationalist Left in the 1987 election.
