= 1983 Canarian regional election =

Election in the Spanish region of the Canary Islands

- 8 May 1983

All 60 seats in the Parliament of the Canary Islands 31 seats needed for a majority
- Opinion polls
- Registered: 925,572
- Turnout: 577,670 (62.4%)
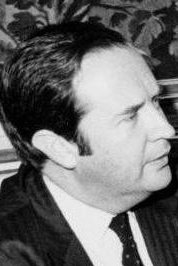

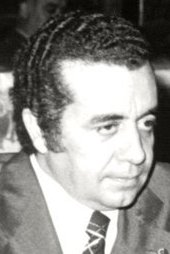

	First party	Second party	Third party
Leader	Jerónimo Saavedra	Francisco Marcos Hernández	Lorenzo Olarte
Party	PSOE	AP–PDP–PL	CDS
Leader since	1977	1983	1983
Leader's seat	Gran Canaria	Tenerife	Gran Canaria
Seats won	27	17	6
Popular vote	233,991	163,419	40,789
Percentage	41.5%	29.0%	7.2%
	Fourth party	Fifth party	Sixth party
Leader	Miguel Cabrera Cabrera	Gonzalo Angulo González	Esteban Bethencourt Gámez
Party	AM	UPC–AC	AGI
Leader since	1983	1983	1983
Leader's seat	Fuerteventura	Gran Canaria	La Gomera
Seats won	3	2	2
Popular vote	5,551	46,784	3,294
Percentage	1.0%	8.3%	0.6%
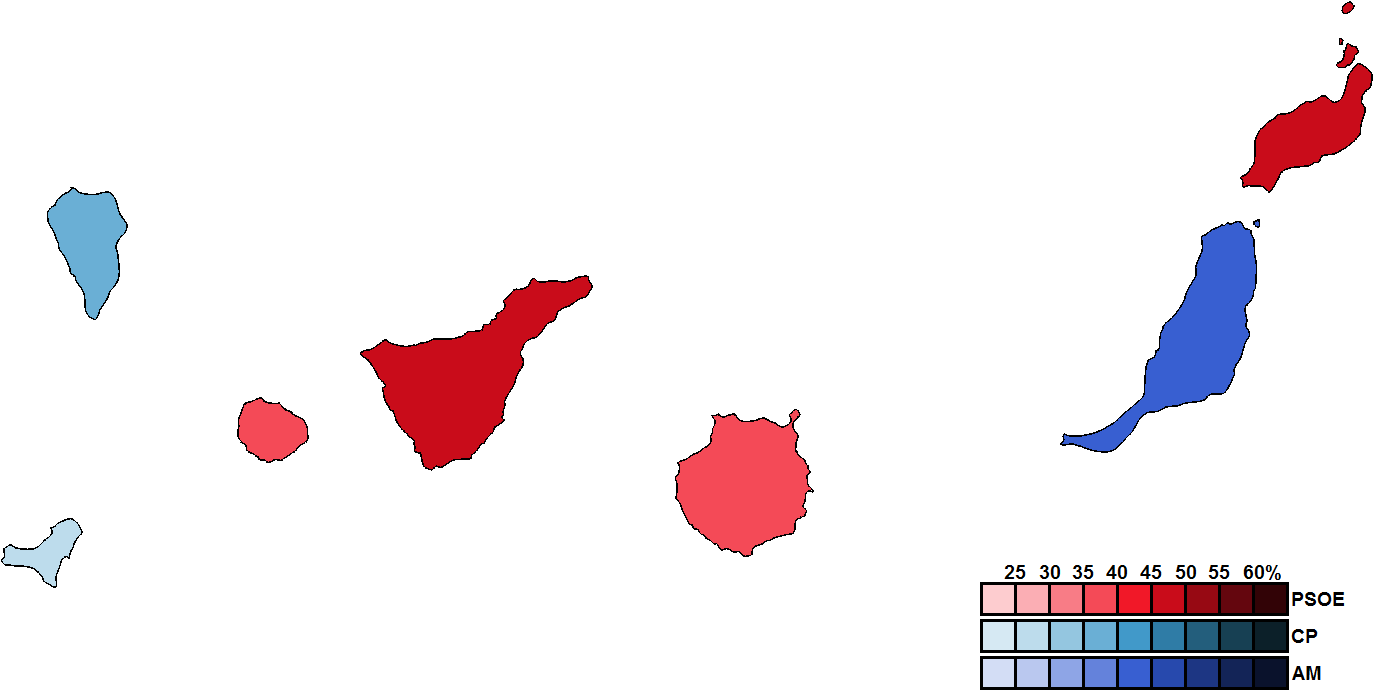
- Constituency results map for the Parliament of the Canary Islands
President before election
Jerónimo Saavedra
PSOE
President after election
Jerónimo Saavedra
PSOE

A regional election was held in the Canary Islands on 8 May 1983 to elect the 1st Parliament of the autonomous community. All 60 seats in the Parliament were up for election. It was held concurrently with regional elections in twelve other autonomous communities and local elections all across Spain.

The Spanish Socialist Workers' Party (PSOE) emerged as the largest party in the archipelago with 27 seats—4 short of an overall majority—following the disintegration and dissolution of the Union of the Democratic Centre (UCD), the former ruling party of Spain in the 1977–1982 period which had achieved virtually unopposed victories in the islands in the 1977 and 1979 general elections. The People's Coalition, an electoral alliance comprising the People's Alliance (AP), the People's Democratic Party (PDP) and the Liberal Union (UL) became the second largest party and the main opposition force in the Parliament with 17 seats, while the also-nationwide Communist Party of Spain (PCE) obtained 1 seat. The centre and centre-right vote became further split between several small parties and splits from the UCD, such as the Democratic and Social Centre (CDS) of former Spanish prime minister Adolfo Suárez, which entered Parliament with 6 seats; the Gomera Group of Independents (AGI), with 2 seats; or the Canarian Nationalist Convergence (CNC) and the Independent Herrenian Group (AHI) with 1 seat each.

The election resulted in the most fragmented regional assembly of those elected on 8 May, with nine parties represented in the Parliament. The PSOE candidate Jerónimo Saavedra, who had been elected as provisional president in December 1982, was able to get re-elected with the support of AM, AGI and AHI, though the party did not commit itself to a global agreement with any other political force.

== Overview ==
Under the 1982 Statute of Autonomy, the Parliament of the Canary Islands was the unicameral legislature of the homonymous autonomous community, having legislative power in devolved matters, as well as the ability to grant or withdraw confidence from a regional president. The electoral and procedural rules were supplemented by national law provisions (which were those used in the 1977 general election).

=== Date ===
The Government of Spain, in coordination with the Regional Government of the Canary Islands, was required to call an election to the Parliament of the Canary Islands within from 1 February to 31 May 1983.

The Parliament of the Canary Islands could not be dissolved before the expiration date of parliament, except in the event of an investiture process failing to elect a regional president within a two-month period from the first ballot. In such a case, the Parliament was to be automatically dissolved and a snap election called, with elected lawmakers serving the remainder of its original four-year term.

On 7 March 1983, it was confirmed that the first Parliament election would be held on 8 May, together with regional elections for twelve other autonomous communities as well as the regularly scheduled nationwide local elections. The election to the Parliament of the Canary Islands was officially called on 10 March 1983 with the publication of the corresponding decree in the Official Journal of Extremadura, setting election day for 8 May.

=== Electoral system ===
Voting for the Parliament was based on universal suffrage, comprising all Spanish nationals over 18 years of age, registered in the Canary Islands and with full political rights.

The Parliament of the Canary Islands had 60 seats in its first election. All were elected in seven multi-member constituencies—corresponding to the islands of El Hierro, Fuerteventura, Gran Canaria, La Gomera, La Palma, Lanzarote and Tenerife, each of which was assigned a fixed number of seats—using the D'Hondt method and closed-list proportional voting, with a 20 percent-threshold of valid votes (including blank ballots) in each constituency or three percent regionally. As a result of the aforementioned allocation, each Parliament constituency was entitled the following seats:

Seats	Constituencies
15	Gran Canaria, Tenerife
8	La Palma, Lanzarote
7	Fuerteventura
4	La Gomera
3	El Hierro

The law did not provide for by-elections to fill vacant seats; instead, any vacancies arising after the proclamation of candidates and during the legislative term were filled by the next candidates on the party lists or, when required, by designated substitutes.

=== Provisional parliament ===
The regional Statute established a provisional assembly—to remain in place until an election to the actual Cortes of Aragon could be held—which was to be made up of 60 members designated by political parties in proportion to the result of the preceding Spanish general election (distributed by applying regional election rules to island results). As a result, the composition of the Provisional Parliament of the Canary Islands, upon its constitution in December 1982, was as indicated below:

Groups	Parties	Legislators	
Groups	Parties	Seats	Total
Socialist Parliamentary Group	PSOE	24	24
People's Parliamentary Group	AP–PDP	16	16
Centrist Parliamentary Group	INDEP	14	14
Mixed Group	CDS	3	6
Mixed Group	UPC	2	6
Mixed Group	CC	1	6

== Opinion polls ==
The tables below list opinion polling results in reverse chronological order, showing the most recent first and using the dates when the survey fieldwork was done, as opposed to the date of publication. Where the fieldwork dates are unknown, the date of publication is given instead. The highest percentage figure in each polling survey is displayed with its background shaded in the leading party's colour. If a tie ensues, this is applied to the figures with the highest percentages. The "Lead" column on the right shows the percentage-point difference between the parties with the highest percentages in a poll.

=== Voting intention estimates ===
The table below lists weighted voting intention estimates. Refusals are generally excluded from the party vote percentages, while question wording and the treatment of "don't know" responses and those not intending to vote may vary between polling organisations. When available, seat projections determined by the polling organisations are displayed below (or in place of) the percentages in a smaller font; 31 seats were required for an absolute majority in the Parliament of the Canary Islands.

Polling firm/Commissioner	Fieldwork date	Sample size	Turnout	UCD	PSOE	UPC	AP–PDP–PL	PCC	CDS	CNC	AC	AM	AGI	AHI	Lead
1983 regional election	8 May 1983	—N/a	62.4	–	41.5; 27	8.3; 2	29.0; 17	4.4; 1	7.2; 6	4.3; 1	(Note: Within UPC.)	1.0; 3	0.6; 2	0.2; 1	12.5
Sofemasa/El País	23–26 Apr 1983	?	?	–	? 35/40	–	? 12/20	–	–	–	–	? 3/4	–	–	?
1982 general election	28 Oct 1982	—N/a	76.0	16.4 (14)	36.7 (24)	5.4 (2)	26.9 (Note: Results for CD (1979) and AP–PDP (1982).) (16)	(Note: Within AC.)	4.9 (3)	3.9 (1)	2.9 (0)	–	–	–	9.8
1979 general election	1 Mar 1979	—N/a	61.1	58.4 (46)	17.8 (11)	11.0 (3)	3.7 (0)	3.7 (0)	–	–	–	–	–	–	40.6

=== Voting preferences ===
The table below lists raw, unweighted voting preferences.

Polling firm/Commissioner	Fieldwork date	Sample size	UCD	PSOE	UPC	AP–PDP–PL	PCC	CDS	CNC	AC	AM	AGI	AHI	Question	X mark	Lead
1983 regional election	8 May 1983	—N/a	–	25.3	5.1	17.7	2.7	4.4	2.6		0.6	0.4	0.1	—N/a	37.6	7.6
CISE–Metra Seis–ECO/CIS	4–9 Apr 1983	500	–	26.3	7.3	8.3	1.7	1.2	–	–	–	–	–	39.8	11.8	18.0
1982 general election	28 Oct 1982	—N/a	12.1	27.0	4.0	19.9		3.6	2.9	2.1	–	–	–	—N/a	24.0	7.1
1979 general election	1 Mar 1979	—N/a	34.8	10.6	6.6	2.2	2.2	–	–	–	–	–	–	—N/a	38.9	24.2

== Results ==
=== Overall ===
Summary of the 8 May 1983 Parliament of the Canary Islands election results →
Parties and alliances	Popular vote			Seats	
Parties and alliances	Votes	%	±pp	Total	+/−
Spanish Socialist Workers' Party (PSOE)	233,991	41.50	n/a	27	n/a
People's Coalition (AP–PDP–UL)	163,419	28.98	n/a	17	n/a
Canarian People's Union–Canarian Assembly (UPC–AC)	46,784	8.30	n/a	2	n/a
Democratic and Social Centre (CDS)	40,789	7.23	n/a	6	n/a
Communist Party of the Canaries (PCC–PCE)	24,868	4.41	n/a	1	n/a
Canarian Nationalist Convergence (CNC)	24,376	4.32	n/a	1	n/a
Party of the Canarian Country (PPC)	7,676	1.36	n/a	0	n/a
Majorera Assembly (AM)	5,551	0.98	n/a	3	n/a
Workers' Socialist Party (PST)	3,909	0.69	n/a	0	n/a
Gomera Group of Independents (AGI)	3,294	0.58	n/a	2	n/a
Lanzarote Independents Group (AIL)	2,718	0.48	n/a	0	n/a
Seven Green Stars (SEV)	2,709	0.48	n/a	0	n/a
Revolutionary Communist League (LCR)	1,784	0.32	n/a	0	n/a
Popular Struggle Coalition (CLP)	1,010	0.18	n/a	0	n/a
Independent Herrenian Group (AHI)	944	0.17	n/a	1	n/a
Blank ballots	0	0.00	n/a		
Total	563,822			60	n/a
Valid votes	563,822	97.60	n/a		
Invalid votes	13,848	2.40	n/a		
Votes cast / turnout	577,670	62.41	n/a		
Abstentions	347,902	37.59	n/a		
Registered voters	925,572				

Popular vote
PSOE	41.50%
AP–PDP–UL	28.98%
UPC–AC	8.30%
CDS	7.23%
PCC–PCE	4.41%
CNC	4.32%
PPC	1.36%
AM	0.98%
AGI	0.58%
AHI	0.17%
Others	2.15%
Blank ballots	0.00%

Seats
PSOE	45.00%
AP–PDP–UL	28.33%
CDS	10.00%
AM	5.00%
UPC–AC	3.33%
AGI	3.33%
CNC	1.67%
PCC–PCE	1.67%
AHI	1.67%

=== Distribution by constituency ===
Constituency	PSOE		CP		UPC–AC		CDS		PCC–PCE		CNC		AM		AGI		AHI	
Constituency	%	S	%	S	%	S	%	S	%	S	%	S	%	S	%	S	%	S
El Hierro	28.5	1	29.9	1					14.0	−							27.6	1
Fuerteventura	13.8	1	18.4	1			22.8	2					45.0	3				
Gran Canaria	39.0	7	28.3	5	9.5	1	5.3	1	4.5	−	9.1	1						
La Gomera	39.2	2	15.2	−					7.3	−					38.3	2		
La Palma	32.0	3	37.4	3			15.8	1	14.8	1								
Lanzarote	47.4	5	18.2	2			12.0	1	4.7	−	4.3	−						
Tenerife	47.1	8	30.5	5	9.9	1	7.3	1	2.7	−								
Total	41.5	27	29.0	17	8.3	2	7.2	6	4.4	1	4.3	1	1.0	3	0.6	2	0.2	1

== Aftermath ==
=== Government formation ===
Investiture; Nomination of Jerónimo Saavedra (PSOE)
Ballot →	7 June 1983
Required majority →	31 out of 60
Yes: • PSOE (27); • AM (3); • AGI (2); • AHI (1)	33 / 60
No: • AP–PDP–UL (15); • CDS (6); • CNC (1)	22 / 60
Abstentions: • UPC–AC (1); • PCC (1)	2 / 60
Absentees: • AP–PDP–UL (2); • UPC–AC (1)	3 / 60

=== 1985 investiture ===
Investiture; Nomination of Jerónimo Saavedra (PSOE)
Ballot →	16 July 1985
Required majority →	31 out of 60
Yes: • PSOE (27); • AM (3); • PRC–PCC (2)	32 / 60
No: • AP–PDP–UL (16); • CDS (6); • CCR (1); • INC (1)	24 / 60
Abstentions: • AGI (1); • AHI (1)	2 / 60
Absentees: • AP–PDP–UL (1); • AGI (1)	2 / 60

== Bibliography ==
Legislation

- Real Decreto-ley 20/1977, de 18 de marzo, sobre Normas Electorales (Royal Decree-Law 20/1977). Official State Gazette (in Spanish). 18 March 1977. BOE-A-1977-7445.
- Ley Orgánica 10/1982, de 10 de agosto, de Estatuto de Autonomía de Canarias (Organic Law 10/1982). Official State Gazette (in Spanish). 10 August 1982 [version as of 16 August 1982]. BOE-A-1982-20821.
- Real Decreto 453/1983,de 9 de Marzo, de convocatoria de elecciones al Parlamento de la Comunidad Autónoma de Canarias (PDF) (Royal Decree 453/1983). Official Gazette of the Canaries (in Spanish). 9 March 1983.

Other

- Government of the Canary Islands (November 1987). Resultados procesos electorales en Canarias. Elecciones Locales: Ayuntamientos y Cabildos (1979-1983-1987). Elecciones Autonómicas: Parlamento de Canarias (1983-1987) (PDF) (in Spanish). Las Palmas de Gran Canaria: Statistics and Documentation Center of the Canary Islands. pp. 203–270. Archived from the original on 2017-04-17.
