= Miguel Cabrera (disambiguation) =

Miguel Cabrera (born 1983) is a Venezuelan baseball player in Major League Baseball.

Miguel Cabrera may also refer to:

- Miguel Cabrera (painter) (1695–1768), Mexican painter
- Miguel Cabrera Cabrera (born 1948), Spanish architect and politician

== See also ==
- Cabrera (surname)
