= Miguel Cabrera Cabrera =

Spanish architect and politician

Miguel Cabrera Cabrera (born 1948 in Gran Canaria, Spain) is a Spanish architect and politician whose sphere of political action has been the Canary Island of Fuerteventura.

He completed three years of high school in Fuerteventura for free and then attended Pérez Galdós High School in the city of Las Palmas de Gran Canaria in Gran Canaria. He studied architecture at colleges in Madrid and Valencia, where he obtained a degree in 1973. He practiced in Gran Canaria and Fuerteventura. In 1975, he was elected for a position in the Governing Board of the Colegio de Arquitectos, until he resigned at the beginning of the general elections in 1977.

For the 1977 general elections, he founded the political party Majorera Assembly, with which he was elected senator by Fuerteventura. He did not won the following election, surpassed by ten votes (4,468 vs. 4,458) by the candidate for the UCD, but he was elected again in the 1982 general elections. In the parliamentary elections of 1987 and 1991, he was elected by Asamblea Majorera.

In 2010, he was chosen as general director of tourist infrastructure for the government of the Canary Islands.
