= Workers' Party of Spain–Communist Unity =

Workers' Party of Spain–Communist Unity Partido de los Trabajadores de España–Unidad Comunista
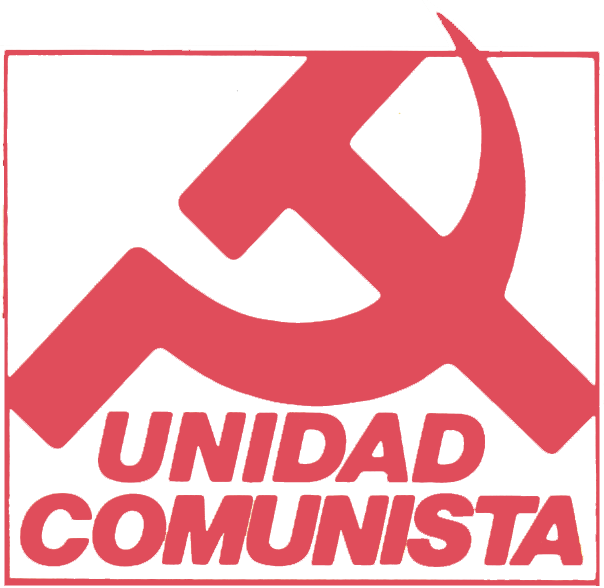
- Secretary-General: Santiago Carrillo
- Founded: 1985
- Dissolved: 1991
- Split from: Communist Party of Spain
- Merged into: PSOE
- Headquarters: Madrid
- Membership (1991): 8,000
- Ideology: Until 1989: Eurocommunism; Revolutionary Marxism; 1989–1991: Democratic socialism; Postcommunism
- Political position: Left-wing

Workers' Party of Spain–Communist Unity (in Spanish: Partido de los Trabajadores de España–Unidad Comunista) was a communist political party in Spain, founded by Santiago Carrillo and his followers after their expulsion from the Communist Party of Spain (PCE) in October 1985.

== History ==
Initially, the party was known as Communist Party of Spain (Revolutionary Marxist) (Partido Comunista de España (Marxista-Revolucionario)), a name still registered at the election authorities, and related to the line of Carrillo in the PCE throughout the 1970s, as the party ideology of PCE under his leadership was redefined from Marxism-Leninism to Revolutionary Marxism.

PTE-UC participated in the 1986 general election with the candidature Communists' Unity Board (Mesa para la Unidad de los Comunistas), which gathered 229,695 votes (1.1%). In the municipal elections of 1987, PTE-UC got 185,104 votes and had 179 town councillors elected. Carrillo stood as a candidate for the European Parliament election of 1987, and got 222,680 votes (1.1%).

The 1989 general elections were a complete failure, as PTE-UC only got 86,257 votes. Following the result, PTE-UC merged into the Spanish Socialist Workers' Party in 1991, and organized itself as an internal tendency called Left Unity (Unidad de la Izquierda). Its president Santiago Carrillo withdrew from politics.

== Election results ==
=== Cortes Generales ===
Election	Leading candidate	Votes	%	Seats	+/–
1986	Santiago Carrillo	229,695	1.14 (#8)	0 / 350	New
1989	Adolfo Piñedo	86,257	0.42 (#15)	0 / 350	–

=== European Parliament ===
Election	Leading candidate	Votes	%	Seats	+/–	EP Group
1987	Santiago Carrillo	222,680	1.16 (#11)	0 / 60	New	–
1989	Santiago Carrillo	197,095	1.24 (#12)	0 / 60	–	–

=== Local elections ===
Election	Votes	%	Seats	Provincial deputies
1987	185,104	0.95 (#11)	179 / 65,577	1 / 1,208
