= Canarian Convergence =

Political party in the Canary Islands

Canarian Convergence Convergencia Canaria Convergencia Nacionalista Canaria Convergencia Canaria Reformista
- Founded: 3 September 1982
- Dissolved: 1993
- Merger of: Liberal Canarian Party; Tagoror; Party of the Canarian Country
- Merged into: Canarian Coalition
- Headquarters: C/ Roque Morera, 2-3o, Las Palmas de Gran Canaria, 35001
- Ideology: Canarian nationalism Gran Canaria Insularism; Centrism
- Political position: Centre

Canarian Convergence (Spanish: Convergencia Canaria, CC) was a centrist Canarian nationalist political party operating in the Canary Islands.

== History ==
CC was created in September 1982 by ex-members of the Canarian Union of the Democratic Centre. In the general elections of 1982 CC received the support of the Liberal Canarian Party, gaining 25,792 votes and no seats.

In 1983 CC changed its name to Canarian Nationalist Convergence (CNC). In the Canarian elections of the same year CNC gained 24,483 votes (3.96%) and a seat in the district of Gran Canaria. In may of the same year CNC became part of the "reformist operation" of Miquel Roca and later changed its name again, this time to Canarian Reformist Convergence (CRC). CRC lost its representation in the Parliament of the Canary Islands in the elections of 1987. In 1993 CRC joined Canarian Coalition and, soon after, disappeared.

== See also ==
- Canarian nationalism
