= Canarian Assembly =

Political party in the Canary Islands

Canarian Assembly Asamblea Canaria
- Founded: 1982
- Dissolved: 1987
- Merger of: Federación Autogestionaria de Asociaciones de Vecinos de Gran Canaria (FAAVGC)
- Ideology: Canarian nationalism Socialism; Workers' self-management Environmentalism; Antimilitarism; Direct democracy
- Political position: Left-wing
- Trade union affiliation: Sindicato Obrero Canario (SOC)
- Canarian Parliament (1983-1987): 2 / 60
- Mayors in the Canary Islands (1983-1987): 2 / 87 Telde and Santa Lucía de Tirajana
- Town councillors in the Canary Islands (1983-1987): 30 / 1,213

Canarian Assembly (Spanish: Asamblea Canaria, AC) was a left-wing nationalist political party operating in the Canary Islands. The party aims were self-determination for the islands, workers' self-management and socialism.

== History ==
AC was born 1982, from the Federación Autogestionaria de Asociaciones de Vecinos de Gran Canaria (Self-managed Federation of Neighborhood Associations of Gran Canaria). AC was a Canarian nationalist and self-management socialist force. In the general elections of 1982 AC joined a coalition with the Communist Party of the Canaries (PCC-PCE). The coalition was known as Canarian Assembly-Canarian Coordination, gaining only the 2.87% of the vote in the Islands.

In the local elections of 1983 AC gained 30 town councillors and the mayorships of Telde and Santa Lucía de Tirajana, gaining the 3.32% of the vote. The same year the first ever Canarian elections were held. AC made a coalition with the Canarian People's Union for this elections, gaining the 8.42% of the vote and seats in the Canarian Parliament.

In 1986 AC made a new coalition with the Canarian Nationalist Left (INC). In the 1987 Canarian elections the coalition got 46,229 votes (6.96%) and 2 seats. After the elections INC and AC merged, forming the Canarian Nationalist Assembly.

== See also ==
- Canarian nationalism
