= Majorera Assembly =

Political party in Spain

Majorera Assembly Asamblea Majorera
- Founded: 1977
- Dissolved: 1995
- Headquarters: Fuerteventura
- Ideology: Canarian nationalism
- Regional affiliation: Canarian Coalition (since 1993)
- Colours: Blue

Website
- ccfuerteventura.com

Majorera Assembly (Spanish: Asamblea Majorera, AM) is a party in Fuerteventura. It was founded in 1977 as a group of independents by Miguel Cabrera Cabrera, who was elected senator in the 1977 and 1982 general elections.

The name is taken from a Fuerteventura goat and cheese and is a Spanish pun on Cabrera's surname.

Before the autonomy of the Canary Islands, AM had a seat in the Canarian Junta. In the 1983 regional election, it gained 3 out of 7 deputies in Fuerteventura. When the party Canarian Independent Groups was formed in 1985, AM refused to join, repeating its result in solitary in the 1987 regional election.

In 1995, it joined Canarian Coalition.
