= Communist Party of the Canaries =

Communist Party of the Canaries Partido Comunista de Canarias
- General Secretary: Miguel Ángel Pérez
- Founded: 1977
- Headquarters: Calle Serrano, 14 (local), 38004 Santa Cruz de Tenerife
- Youth wing: Communist Youth - Canaries (JCC-UJCE)
- Ideology: Communism; Republicanism
- Political position: Left-wing to far-left
- National affiliation: Communist Party of Spain
- Regional affiliation: Canarian United Left (1986–present)
- Colours: Red

Website
- www.pce.es/canarias/

The Communist Party of the Canaries (in Spanish: Partido Comunista de Canarias, PCC) is the federation of the Communist Party of Spain (PCE) in the Canary Islands. The general secretary of PCC is Maria D. Puig Barrios. Its headquarters are in Santa Cruz de Tenerife.
