= Liberal Democratic Party (Spain, 1982) =

Defunct liberal party in Spain

Liberal Democratic Party Partido Demócrata Liberal
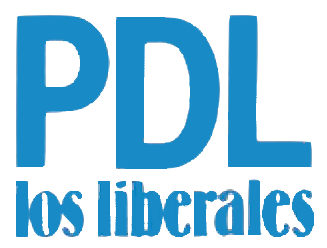
- Secretary-General: Antonio Garrigues Walker
- Founded: July 13, 1982
- Dissolved: November 23, 1984
- Merged into: Democratic Reformist Party
- Headquarters: Madrid
- Ideology: Liberalism
- Political position: Centre to centre-right

The Liberal Democratic Party (Partido Demócrata Liberal in Spanish language, PDL) was a liberal Spanish political party led by Antonio Garrigues Walker, founded in 1982.

== History ==
The PDL tried to reach a coalition agreement with the Union of the Democratic Center (UCD) for the general elections held in October 1982. Finally, due to the failure to reach an agreement, the PDL chose not to present themselves to the elections.

In the autonomic and local elections of 1983 the PDL gained one seat in the regional parliaments of Castille and León and the Balearic Islands, along with 840 local town councillors.

The PDL joined the Democratic Reformist Party in 1984.
