= Canarian Nationalist Left =

Political party in the Canary Islands

Canarian Nationalist Left Izquierda Nacionalista Canaria
- Leader: Oswaldo Brito
- Founded: 1986
- Dissolved: 1987
- Merger of: Canarian Nationalist Autonomous Confederation
- Merged into: Canarian Nationalist Assembly
- Ideology: Canarian nationalism Socialism
- Trade union affiliation: Sindicato Obrero Canario (SOC)

Canarian Nationalist Left (Spanish: Izquierda Nacionalista Canaria, INC) was a Canarian left-wing nationalist political party operating in the Canary Islands.

== History ==
INC emerged from the Canarian Nationalist Autonomous Confederation (CANC), and splinter group of the Canarian People's Union (UPC). In the 1987 Canarian elections, INC run in a coalition with Canarian Assembly, gaining 46,229 votes (6.96%) and 2 seats. Later in the same year, both parties merged and created the Canarian Nationalist Alternative.

== See also ==
- Canarian nationalism
