= 1999 Canarian regional election =

Election in the Spanish region of the Canary Islands

- 13 June 1999

All 60 seats in the Parliament of the Canary Islands 31 seats needed for a majority
- Opinion polls
- Registered: 1,373,641 ▲10.0%
- Turnout: 835,181 (60.8%) ▼3.4 pp
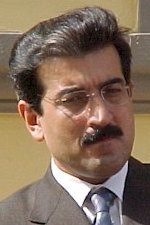

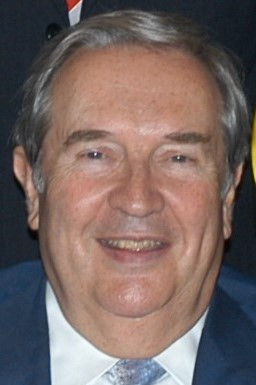

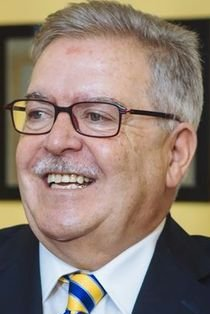

	First party	Second party	Third party
Leader	Román Rodríguez	Jerónimo Saavedra	José Miguel Bravo de Laguna
Party	CC	PSOE	PP
Leader since	1999	27 June 1998	1991
Leader's seat	Gran Canaria	Gran Canaria	Gran Canaria
Last election	21 seats, 32.8%	16 seats, 23.1%	18 seats, 31.1%
Seats won	24	19	15
Seat change	▲3	▲3	▼3
Popular vote	306,658	199,503	225,316
Percentage	36.9%	24.0%	27.1%
Swing	▲4.1 pp	▲0.9 pp	▼4.0 pp
	Fourth party	Fifth party
Leader	Belén Allende	Juan Manuel García Ramos
Party	AHI	FNC
Leader since	1999	1999
Leader's seat	El Hierro	Tenerife (lost)
Last election	1 seat, 0.3%	4 seats, 3.0% (Note: Results for PCN in the 1995 election.)
Seats won	2	0
Seat change	▲1	▼4
Popular vote	2,773	39,947
Percentage	0.3%	4.8%
Swing	0.0 pp	▲1.8 pp
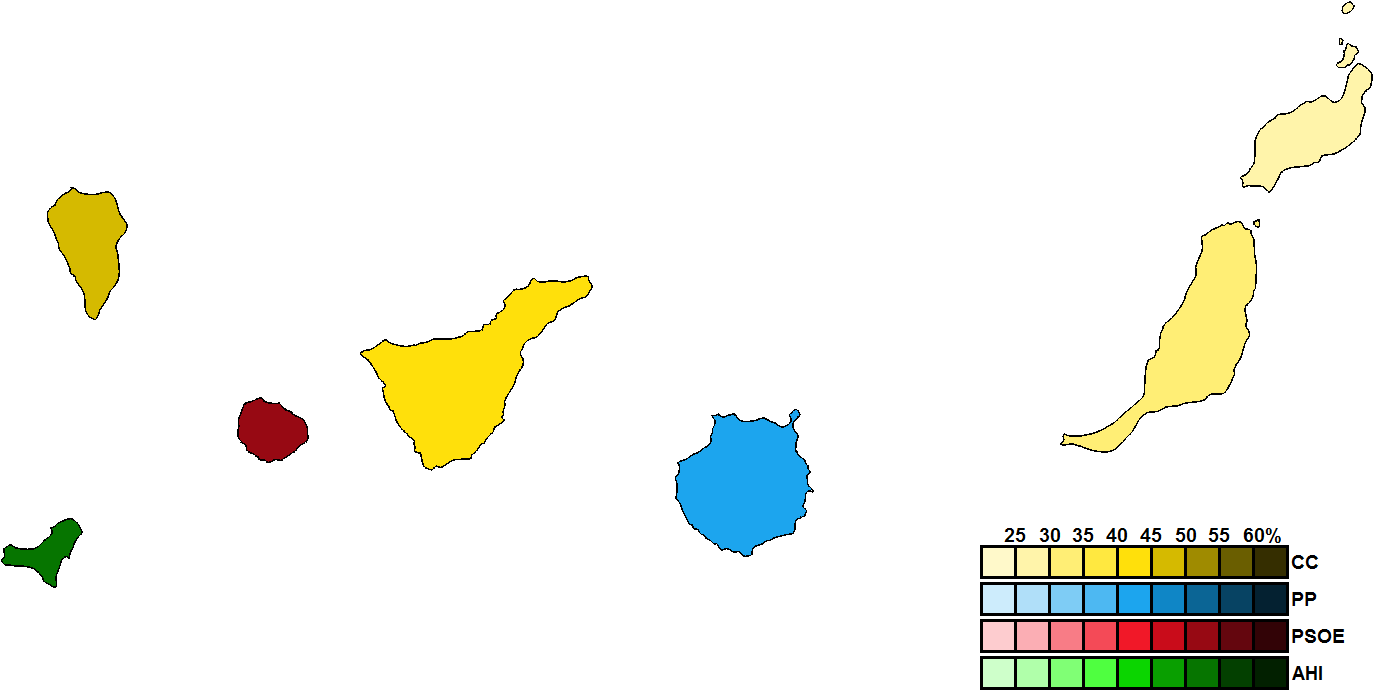
- Constituency results map for the Parliament of the Canary Islands
President before election
Manuel Hermoso
AIC (CC)
President after election
Román Rodríguez
ICAN (CC)

A regional election was held in the Canary Islands on 13 June 1999 to elect the 5th Parliament of the autonomous community. All 60 seats in the Parliament were up for election. It was held concurrently with regional elections in twelve other autonomous communities and local elections all across Spain, as well as the 1999 European Parliament election.

== Overview ==
Under the 1982 Statute of Autonomy, the Parliament of the Canary Islands was the unicameral legislature of the homonymous autonomous community, having legislative power in devolved matters, as well as the ability to grant or withdraw confidence from a regional president. The electoral and procedural rules were supplemented by national law provisions.

=== Date ===
The term of the Parliament of the Canary Islands expired four years after the date of its previous ordinary election, with election day being fixed for the fourth Sunday of May every four years, but a 1998 amendment allowed for regional elections held in May 1995 to be held concurrently with European Parliament elections, provided that they were scheduled for within a four month-timespan. The election decree was required to be issued no later than 54 days before the scheduled election date and published on the following day in the Official Gazette of the Canaries (BOC). The previous election was held on 28 May 1995, setting the date for election day concurrently with that year's European Parliament election on 13 June 1999.

The Parliament of the Canary Islands could not be dissolved before the expiration date of parliament, except in the event of an investiture process failing to elect a regional president within a two-month period from the first ballot. In such a case, the Parliament was to be automatically dissolved and a snap election called, with elected lawmakers serving the remainder of its original four-year term.

The election to the Parliament of the Canary Islands was officially called on 20 April 1999 with the publication of the corresponding decree in the BOC, setting election day for 13 June.

=== Electoral system ===
Voting for the Parliament was based on universal suffrage, comprising all Spanish nationals over 18 years of age, registered in the Canary Islands and with full political rights, provided that they had not been deprived of the right to vote by a final sentence, nor were legally incapacitated.

The Parliament of the Canary Islands had a minimum of 50 and a maximum of 70 seats, with electoral provisions fixing its size at 60. All were elected in seven multi-member constituencies—corresponding to the islands of El Hierro, Fuerteventura, Gran Canaria, La Gomera, La Palma, Lanzarote and Tenerife, each of which was assigned a fixed number of seats—using the D'Hondt method and closed-list proportional voting, with a 30 percent-threshold of valid votes (including blank ballots) in each constituency or six percent regionally.

As a result of the aforementioned allocation, each Parliament constituency was entitled the following seats:

Seats	Constituencies
15	Gran Canaria, Tenerife
8	La Palma, Lanzarote
7	Fuerteventura
4	La Gomera
3	El Hierro

The law did not provide for by-elections to fill vacant seats; instead, any vacancies arising after the proclamation of candidates and during the legislative term were filled by the next candidates on the party lists or, when required, by designated substitutes.

=== Outgoing parliament ===
The table below shows the composition of the parliamentary groups in the chamber at the time of the election call.

Parliamentary composition in April 1999
Groups	Parties	Legislators	
Groups	Parties	Seats	Total
Canarian Coalition Parliamentary Group (CC)	AIC	12	18
Canarian Coalition Parliamentary Group (CC)	CCN	4	18
Canarian Coalition Parliamentary Group (CC)	ICAN	1	18
Canarian Coalition Parliamentary Group (CC)	AM	1	18
People's Parliamentary Group	PP	18	18
Canarian Socialist Parliamentary Group	PSOE	16	16
Mixed Parliamentary Group	PIL	3	8
Mixed Parliamentary Group	IF	1	8
Mixed Parliamentary Group	AHI	1	8
Mixed Parliamentary Group	PNC	1	8
Mixed Parliamentary Group	INDEP	2 (Note: José Luis Álamo and Pedro Medina, former CC legislators.)	8

== Parties and candidates ==
The electoral law allowed for parties and federations registered in the interior ministry, alliances and groupings of electors to present lists of candidates. Parties and federations intending to form an alliance were required to inform the relevant electoral commission within 10 days of the election call, whereas groupings of electors needed to secure the signature of at least one percent of the electorate in the constituencies for which they sought election, disallowing electors from signing for more than one list.

Below is a list of the main parties and alliances which contested the election:

Candidacy	Parties and alliances	Candidate	Ideology	Previous result		Gov.	Ref.
Candidacy	Parties and alliances	Candidate	Ideology	Vote %	Seats	Gov.	Ref.
CC	List: Canarian Independent Groups (AIC) – Tenerife Group of Independents (ATI) – La Palma Group of Independents (API) – Gomera Group of Independents (AGI); Nationalist Canarian Initiative (ICAN); Nationalist Canarian Centre (CCN); Majorera Assembly (AM)	Román Rodríguez	Regionalism; Canarian nationalism Centrism	32.8%	21	Yes	
PP	List: People's Party (PP)	José Miguel Bravo de Laguna	Conservatism; Christian democracy	31.1%	18	Yes	
PSOE	List: Spanish Socialist Workers' Party (PSOE)	Jerónimo Saavedra	Social democracy	23.1%	16	No	
FNC	List: Canarian Nationalist Party (PNC); Lanzarote Independents Party (PIL); Independents of Fuerteventura (IF)	Juan Manuel García Ramos	Canarian nationalism	3.0%	4	No	
AHI	List: Independent Herrenian Group (AHI)	Belén Allende	Insularism; Canarian nationalism Centrism	0.3%	1	No	

== Opinion polls ==
The tables below list opinion polling results in reverse chronological order, showing the most recent first and using the dates when the survey fieldwork was done, as opposed to the date of publication. Where the fieldwork dates are unknown, the date of publication is given instead. The highest percentage figure in each polling survey is displayed with its background shaded in the leading party's colour. If a tie ensues, this is applied to the figures with the highest percentages. The "Lead" column on the right shows the percentage-point difference between the parties with the highest percentages in a poll.

=== Voting intention estimates ===
The table below lists weighted voting intention estimates. Refusals are generally excluded from the party vote percentages, while question wording and the treatment of "don't know" responses and those not intending to vote may vary between polling organisations. When available, seat projections determined by the polling organisations are displayed below (or in place of) the percentages in a smaller font; 31 seats were required for an absolute majority in the Parliament of the Canary Islands.

Polling firm/Commissioner	Fieldwork date	Sample size	Turnout	CC	PP	PSOE	IUC	FNC	AHI	Lead
1999 regional election	13 Jun 1999	—N/a	60.8	36.9; 24	27.1; 15	24.0; 19	2.7; 0	4.8; 0	0.3; 2	9.8
Eco Consulting/ABC	24 May–2 Jun 1999	?	?	37.1; 22/23	31.0; 17/19	20.1; 15/17	–	3.3; 3/4	0.3; 1/2	6.1
Demoscopia/El País	26 May–1 Jun 1999	?	63	35.2; 21	33.7; 19/20	22.3; 16/17	4.7; 0	1.0; 2	0.3; 1	1.5
CIS	3–23 May 1999	1,599	64.0	36.5; 23/24	32.1; 18/19	21.1; 14/15	3.6; 0	4.3; 2/3	0.3; 1/2	4.4
Sigma Dos/El Mundo	17–20 May 1999	1,000	?	31.9; 19/22	31.6; 19/21	23.4; 17/19	5.3; 0	3.3; 0/2	? 0/1	0.3
1996 general election	3 Mar 1996	—N/a	69.1	25.1	37.6	30.0	5.5	–	(Note: Within CC.)	7.6
1995 regional election	28 May 1995	—N/a	64.2	32.8; 21	31.1; 18	23.1; 16	5.1; 0	3.0; 4	0.3; 1	1.7

=== Voting preferences ===
The table below lists raw, unweighted voting preferences.

Polling firm/Commissioner	Fieldwork date	Sample size	CC	PP	PSOE	IUC	FNC	AHI	Question	X mark	Lead
1999 regional election (Note: Does not include non-resident citizens.)	13 Jun 1999	—N/a	22.8	16.7	14.8	1.6	2.9	0.2	—N/a	38.2	6.1
CIS	3–23 May 1999	1,599	23.6	16.6	12.4	2.7	1.7	0.1	31.7	7.4	7.0
1996 general election	3 Mar 1996	—N/a	17.5	26.2	20.7	3.8	–		—N/a	30.2	5.5
1995 regional election	28 May 1995	—N/a	21.0	19.8	14.7	3.3	1.9	0.2	—N/a	35.0	1.2

=== Victory preferences ===
The table below lists opinion polling on the victory preferences for each party in the event of a regional election taking place.

Polling firm/Commissioner	Fieldwork date	Sample size	CC	PP	PSOE	IUC	FNC	AHI	Other/ None	Question	Lead
CIS	3–23 May 1999	1,599	27.8	19.6	15.6	3.1	1.8	0.1	1.7	30.4	8.2

=== Victory likelihood ===
The table below lists opinion polling on the perceived likelihood of victory for each party in the event of a regional election taking place.

Polling firm/Commissioner	Fieldwork date	Sample size	CC	PP	PSOE	IUC	FNC	AHI	Other/ None	Question	Lead
CIS	3–23 May 1999	1,599	24.3	30.2	6.3	0.1	0.2	0.1	0.6	38.1	5.9

=== Preferred President ===
The table below lists opinion polling on leader preferences to become president of the Canary Islands.

Polling firm/Commissioner	Fieldwork date	Sample size						Other/ None/ Not care	Question	Lead
Polling firm/Commissioner	Fieldwork date	Sample size	Rodríguez CC	Bravo de Laguna PP	Saavedra PSOE	G. Ramos FNC	Martínez IUC	Other/ None/ Not care	Question	Lead
CIS	3–23 May 1999	1,599	6.1	11.2	18.4	0.6	2.6	7.9	53.1	7.2

== Results ==
=== Overall ===
← Summary of the 13 June 1999 Parliament of the Canary Islands election results →
Parties and alliances	Popular vote			Seats	
Parties and alliances	Votes	%	±pp	Total	+/−
Canarian Coalition (CC)	306,658	36.93	+4.13	24	+3
People's Party (PP)	225,316	27.13	−3.94	15	−3
Spanish Socialist Workers' Party (PSOE)	199,503	24.03	+0.95	19	+3
Canarian Nationalist Federation (FNC)^{1}	39,947	4.81	+1.81	0	−4
Canarian United Left (IUC)	22,768	2.74	−2.36	0	±0
The Greens of the Canaries (Verdes)	12,146	1.46	New	0	±0
Centrist Union–Democratic and Social Centre (UC–CDS)	4,442	0.53	−0.14	0	±0
Independent Herrenian Group (AHI)	2,773	0.33	+0.07	2	+1
Humanist Party (PH)	1,346	0.16	−0.04	0	±0
Nationalist Maga Alternative (AMAGA)	864	0.10	New	0	±0
Canarian Alternative–Independent Citizens of the Canaries (AC–CICA)	806	0.10	New	0	±0
Pensionist Assembly of the Canaries (TPC)	692	0.08	New	0	±0
Fuerteventura Popular Platform (PPF)	533	0.06	New	0	±0
Blank ballots	12,558	1.51	+0.37		
Total	830,352			60	±0
Valid votes	830,352	99.42	−0.01		
Invalid votes	4,829	0.58	+0.01		
Votes cast / turnout	835,181	60.80	−3.40		
Abstentions	538,460	39.20	+3.40		
Registered voters	1,373,641				
Sources
Footnotes: ^{1} Canarian Nationalist Federation results are compared to Nationalist Canarian Platform totals in the 1995 election.

Popular vote
CC	36.93%
PP	27.13%
PSOE	24.03%
FNC	4.81%
IUC	2.74%
LV	1.46%
AHI	0.33%
Others	1.05%
Blank ballots	1.51%

Seats
CC	40.00%
PSOE	31.67%
PP	25.00%
AHI	3.33%

=== Distribution by constituency ===
Constituency	CC		PP		PSOE		AHI	
Constituency	%	S	%	S	%	S	%	S
El Hierro			22.8	−	23.1	1	51.3	2
Fuerteventura	34.7	3	21.1	2	26.7	2		
Gran Canaria	31.8	5	40.3	7	18.4	3		
La Gomera	31.2	1	10.9	−	50.3	3		
La Palma	47.3	4	21.3	2	27.0	2		
Lanzarote	28.5	4	13.3	1	24.2	3		
Tenerife	43.0	7	16.2	3	28.6	5		
Total	36.9	24	27.1	15	24.0	19	0.3	1

== Aftermath ==
=== Government formation ===
Investiture; Nomination of Román Rodríguez (ICAN)
Ballot →	14 July 1999
Required majority →	31 out of 60
Yes: • CC (23); • PP (15); • AHI (2)	40 / 60
No: • PSOE (18)	18 / 60
Abstentions	0 / 60
Absentees: • CC (1); • PSOE (1)	2 / 60

=== 2001 motion of no confidence ===
Motion of no confidence Nomination of Juan Carlos Alemán (PSOE)
Ballot →	7 November 2001
Required majority →	31 out of 60
Yes: • PSOE (19)	19 / 60
No: • CC (24); • PP (15)	39 / 60
Abstentions: • AHI (2)	2 / 60
Absentees	0 / 60

== Bibliography ==
- Ley Orgánica 10/1982, de 10 de agosto, de Estatuto de Autonomía de Canarias (Organic Law 10/1982). Official State Gazette (in Spanish). 10 August 1982 [version as of 5 August 1997]. BOE-A-1982-20821.
- Ley Orgánica 5/1985, de 19 de junio, del Régimen Electoral General (Organic Law 5/1985). Official State Gazette (in Spanish). 19 June 1985 [version as of 22 April 1999]. BOE-A-1985-11672.
- Ley 3/1987, de 3 de abril, de medidas urgentes en materia electoral (Law 3/1987). Official State Gazette (in Spanish). 3 April 1987. BOE-A-1987-9084.
- Ley 2/1991, de 18 de marzo, de modificación de determinados artículos de la Ley Territorial 3/1987, de 3 de abril, de medidas urgentes en materia electoral (Law 2/1991). Official State Gazette (in Spanish). 18 March 1991. BOE-A-1991-8593.
- Decreto 158/1999, de 19 de abril, del Presidente de la Comunidad Autónoma de Canarias, por el que se convocan elecciones al Parlamento de Canarias (PDF) (Decree 158/1999). Official Gazette of the Canaries (in Spanish). 19 April 1999.
