= La Gomera (Parliament of the Canary Islands constituency) =

Coordinates: 28°07′N 17°13′W

- Parliament of the Canary Islands; Electoral constituency
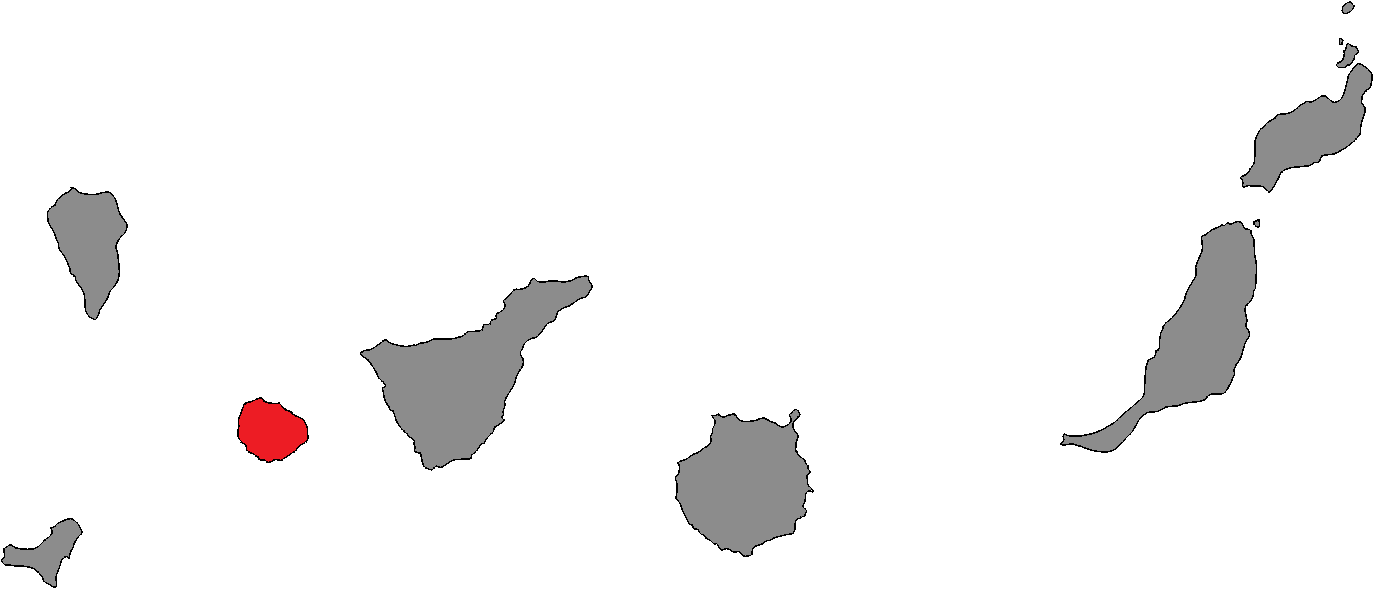
- Location of La Gomera within the Canary Islands
- Island: La Gomera
- Autonomous community: Canary Islands
- Population: ▲22,436 (2024)
- Electorate: ▲26,782 (2023)
- Major settlements: San Sebastián de La Gomera

Current constituency
- Created: 1983
- Seats: 4
- Members: ASG (3); PSOE (1)

La Gomera is one of the seven constituencies (Spanish: circunscripciones) represented in the Parliament of the Canary Islands, the regional legislature of the Autonomous Community of the Canary Islands. The constituency currently elects 4 deputies. Its boundaries correspond to those of the island of La Gomera. The electoral system uses the D'Hondt method and closed-list proportional representation, with a minimum threshold of fifteen percent in the constituency or four percent regionally.

== Electoral system ==
The constituency was created as per the Statute of Autonomy of the Canary Islands of 1982 and was first contested in the 1983 regional election. The Statute provides for the seven main islands in the Canarian archipelago—El Hierro, Fuerteventura, Gran Canaria, La Gomera, La Palma, Lanzarote and Tenerife—to be established as multi-member districts in the Parliament of the Canary Islands. Each constituency is allocated a fixed number of seats: 3 for El Hierro, 8 for Fuerteventura—7 until 2018—15 for Gran Canaria, 4 for La Gomera, 8 for La Palma, 8 for Lanzarote and 15 for Tenerife.

Voting is on the basis of universal suffrage, which comprises all nationals over eighteen, registered in the Canary Islands and in full enjoyment of their political rights. Amendments to the electoral law in 2011 required for Canarian citizens abroad to apply for voting before being permitted to vote, a system known as "begged" or expat vote (Spanish: Voto rogado) which was abolished in 2022. Seats are elected using the D'Hondt method and a closed list proportional representation, with an electoral threshold of 15 percent of valid votes—which includes blank ballots; until a 1997 reform, the threshold was set at 20 percent; between 1997 and 2018, it was set at 30 percent—being applied in each constituency. Alternatively, parties can also enter the seat distribution as long as they reach four percent regionally—three percent until 1997, six percent between 1997 and 2018.

The electoral law allows for parties and federations registered in the interior ministry, coalitions and groupings of electors to present lists of candidates. Parties and federations intending to form a coalition ahead of an election are required to inform the relevant Electoral Commission within ten days of the election call—fifteen before 1985—whereas groupings of electors need to secure the signature of at least one percent of the electorate in the constituencies for which they seek election—one-thousandth of the electorate, with a compulsory minimum of 500 signatures, until 1985—disallowing electors from signing for more than one list of candidates.

== Deputies ==
Deputies 1983–present
Key to parties PSOE ASG AGI CCa PP
| Cortes | Election | Distribution |
| 1st | 1983 | 2 / 2 |
| 2nd | 1987 | 3 / 1 |
| 3rd | 1991 | 3 / 1 |
| 4th | 1995 | 2 / 2 |
| 5th | 1999 | 3 / 1 |
| 6th | 2003 | 3 / 1 |
| 7th | 2007 | 3 / 1 |
| 8th | 2011 | 2 / 1 / 1 |
| 9th | 2015 | 1 / 3 |
| 10th | 2019 | 1 / 3 |
| 11th | 2023 | 1 / 3 |

== Regional elections ==
=== 2023 ===
Summary of the 28 May 2023 Parliament of the Canary Islands election results in La Gomera
| Parties and alliances | Popular vote | | | Seats | |
| Parties and alliances | Votes | % | ±pp | Total | +/− |
|---|---|---|---|---|---|
| Gomera Socialist Group (ASG) | 6,765 | 54.68 | +2.56 | 3 | ±0 |
| Spanish Socialist Workers' Party (PSOE) | 2,213 | 17.89 | –2.85 | 1 | ±0 |
| Initiative for La Gomera (IxLG) | 1,312 | 10.60 | New | 0 | ±0 |
| Canarian Coalition (CCa)^{1} | 1,147 | 9.27 | +0.12 | 0 | ±0 |
| People's Party (PP) | 553 | 4.47 | +0.08 | 0 | ±0 |
| Vox (Vox) | 247 | 2.00 | New | 0 | ±0 |
| Blank ballots | 135 | 1.09 | +0.28 | | |
| Total | 12,372 | | | 4 | ±0 |
| Valid votes | 12,372 | 97.90 | –1.01 | | |
| Invalid votes | 266 | 2.10 | +1.01 | | |
| Votes cast / turnout | 12,638 | 47.19 | +0.30 | | |
| Abstentions | 14,144 | 52.81 | –0.30 | | |
| Registered voters | 26,782 | | | | |
Sources
Footnotes: ^{1} Canarian Coalition results are compared to Canarian Coalition–Canarian Nationalist Party totals in the 2019 election.

=== 2019 ===
Summary of the 26 May 2019 Parliament of the Canary Islands election results in La Gomera
| Parties and alliances | Popular vote | | | Seats | |
| Parties and alliances | Votes | % | ±pp | Total | +/− |
|---|---|---|---|---|---|
| Gomera Socialist Group (ASG) | 6,222 | 52.12 | +9.16 | 3 | ±0 |
| Spanish Socialist Workers' Party (PSOE) | 2,476 | 20.74 | +4.31 | 1 | ±0 |
| Canarian Coalition–Canarian Nationalist Party (CCa–PNC) | 1,092 | 9.15 | –1.36 | 0 | ±0 |
| Yes We Can Canaries (Podemos–SSP–Equo)^{1} | 792 | 6.63 | –2.14 | 0 | ±0 |
| People's Party (PP) | 524 | 4.39 | –5.90 | 0 | ±0 |
| New Canaries (NCa) | 476 | 3.99 | –1.94 | 0 | ±0 |
| Citizens–Party of the Citizenry (Cs) | 201 | 1.68 | –0.35 | 0 | ±0 |
| Canarian United Left (IUC)^{2} | 58 | 0.49 | –0.75 | 0 | ±0 |
| Blank ballots | 97 | 0.81 | –0.08 | | |
| Total | 11,938 | | | 4 | ±0 |
| Valid votes | 11,938 | 98.91 | +0.53 | | |
| Invalid votes | 132 | 1.09 | –0.53 | | |
| Votes cast / turnout | 12,070 | 46.89 | –0.63 | | |
| Abstentions | 13,673 | 53.11 | +0.63 | | |
| Registered voters | 25,743 | | | | |
Sources
Footnotes: ^{1} Yes We Can Canaries results are compared to We Can totals in the 2015 election.; ^{2} Canarian United Left results are compared to Canaries Decides totals in the 2015 election.

=== 2015 ===
Summary of the 24 May 2015 Parliament of the Canary Islands election results in La Gomera
| Parties and alliances | Popular vote | | | Seats | |
| Parties and alliances | Votes | % | ±pp | Total | +/− |
|---|---|---|---|---|---|
| Gomera Socialist Group (ASG) | 5,090 | 42.96 | New | 3 | +3 |
| Spanish Socialist Workers' Party (PSOE) | 1,946 | 16.43 | –28.50 | 1 | –1 |
| Canarian Coalition–Canarian Nationalist Party (CCa–PNC) | 1,245 | 10.51 | –10.35 | 0 | –1 |
| People's Party (PP) | 1,219 | 10.29 | –14.44 | 0 | –1 |
| We Can (Podemos) | 1,039 | 8.77 | New | 0 | ±0 |
| New Canaries (NCa) | 703 | 5.93 | +1.71 | 0 | ±0 |
| Citizens–Party of the Citizenry (C's) | 241 | 2.03 | New | 0 | ±0 |
| Canaries Decides (IUC–LV–UP–ALTER)^{1} | 147 | 1.24 | –1.23 | 0 | ±0 |
| Animalist Party Against Mistreatment of Animals (PACMA) | 86 | 0.73 | New | 0 | ±0 |
| Movement for the Unity of the Canarian People (MUPC) | 15 | 0.13 | –0.12 | 0 | ±0 |
| Union, Progress and Democracy (UPyD) | 11 | 0.09 | New | 0 | ±0 |
| Blank ballots | 105 | 0.89 | –0.45 | | |
| Total | 11,847 | | | 4 | ±0 |
| Valid votes | 11,847 | 98.38 | +0.03 | | |
| Invalid votes | 195 | 1.62 | –0.03 | | |
| Votes cast / turnout | 12,042 | 47.52 | –4.26 | | |
| Abstentions | 13,301 | 52.48 | +4.26 | | |
| Registered voters | 25,343 | | | | |
Sources
Footnotes: ^{1} Canaries Decides results are compared to The Greens totals in the 2011 election.

=== 2011 ===
Summary of the 22 May 2011 Parliament of the Canary Islands election results in La Gomera
| Parties and alliances | Popular vote | | | Seats | |
| Parties and alliances | Votes | % | ±pp | Total | +/− |
|---|---|---|---|---|---|
| Spanish Socialist Workers' Party (PSOE) | 5,324 | 44.93 | –9.86 | 2 | –1 |
| People's Party (PP) | 2,931 | 24.73 | +19.71 | 1 | +1 |
| Canarian Coalition–Nationalist Party–Canarian Centre (CC–PNC–CCN)^{1} | 2,472 | 20.86 | –16.40 | 1 | ±0 |
| Socialists for La Gomera–New Gomera–New Canaries (NCa) | 500 | 4.22 | New | 0 | ±0 |
| The Greens (Verdes) | 293 | 2.47 | +1.33 | 0 | ±0 |
| Yes We Can Citizens' Alternative (ACSSP)^{2} | 141 | 1.19 | +0.04 | 0 | ±0 |
| Movement for the Unity of the Canarian People (MUPC) | 30 | 0.25 | New | 0 | ±0 |
| Blank ballots | 159 | 1.34 | +0.70 | | |
| Total | 11,850 | | | 4 | ±0 |
| Valid votes | 11,850 | 98.35 | –1.00 | | |
| Invalid votes | 199 | 1.65 | +1.00 | | |
| Votes cast / turnout | 12,049 | 51.78 | –11.73 | | |
| Abstentions | 11,222 | 48.22 | +11.73 | | |
| Registered voters | 23,271 | | | | |
Sources
Footnotes: ^{1} Canarian Coalition–Nationalist Party–Canarian Centre results are compared to the combined totals of Canarian Coalition–Canarian Nationalist Party and Canarian Centre in the 2007 election.; ^{2} Yes We Can Citizens' Alternative results are compared to Canarian Popular Alternative–25 May Citizens' Alternative totals in the 2007 election.

=== 2007 ===
Summary of the 27 May 2007 Parliament of the Canary Islands election results in La Gomera
| Parties and alliances | Popular vote | | | Seats | |
| Parties and alliances | Votes | % | ±pp | Total | +/− |
|---|---|---|---|---|---|
| Spanish Socialist Workers' Party (PSOE) | 8,155 | 54.79 | +0.44 | 3 | ±0 |
| Canarian Coalition–Canarian Nationalist Party (CC–PNC)^{1} | 4,742 | 31.86 | –3.97 | 1 | ±0 |
| Canarian Centre (CCN) | 803 | 5.40 | New | 0 | ±0 |
| People's Party (PP) | 747 | 5.02 | –2.32 | 0 | ±0 |
| Canarian Popular Alternative–25 May Citizens' Alternative (APCa–AC25M) | 171 | 1.15 | New | 0 | ±0 |
| The Greens (Verdes) | 170 | 1.14 | New | 0 | ±0 |
| Blank ballots | 96 | 0.64 | –0.63 | | |
| Total | 14,884 | | | 4 | ±0 |
| Valid votes | 14,884 | 99.35 | +0.06 | | |
| Invalid votes | 98 | 0.65 | –0.06 | | |
| Votes cast / turnout | 14,982 | 63.51 | +4.37 | | |
| Abstentions | 8,609 | 36.49 | –4.37 | | |
| Registered voters | 23,591 | | | | |
Sources
Footnotes: ^{1} Canarian Coalition–Canarian Nationalist Party results are compared to the combined totals of Canarian Coalition and Canarian Nationalist Federation in the 2003 election.

=== 2003 ===
Summary of the 25 May 2003 Parliament of the Canary Islands election results in La Gomera
| Parties and alliances | Popular vote | | | Seats | |
| Parties and alliances | Votes | % | ±pp | Total | +/− |
|---|---|---|---|---|---|
| Spanish Socialist Workers' Party (PSOE) | 7,166 | 54.35 | +4.00 | 3 | ±0 |
| Canarian Coalition (CC) | 4,586 | 34.78 | +3.55 | 1 | ±0 |
| People's Party (PP) | 968 | 7.34 | –3.58 | 0 | ±0 |
| Canarian United Left (IUC) | 158 | 1.20 | –4.22 | 0 | ±0 |
| Canarian Nationalist Federation (FNC) | 138 | 1.05 | –0.02 | 0 | ±0 |
| Blank ballots | 168 | 1.27 | +0.45 | | |
| Total | 13,184 | | | 4 | ±0 |
| Valid votes | 13,184 | 99.29 | +0.08 | | |
| Invalid votes | 94 | 0.71 | –0.08 | | |
| Votes cast / turnout | 13,278 | 59.14 | –3.06 | | |
| Abstentions | 9,172 | 40.86 | +3.06 | | |
| Registered voters | 22,450 | | | | |

=== 1999 ===
Summary of the 13 June 1999 Parliament of the Canary Islands election results in La Gomera
| Parties and alliances | Popular vote | | | Seats | |
| Parties and alliances | Votes | % | ±pp | Total | +/− |
|---|---|---|---|---|---|
| Spanish Socialist Workers' Party (PSOE) | 5,841 | 50.35 | +3.40 | 3 | +1 |
| Canarian Coalition (CC) | 3,623 | 31.23 | –4.29 | 1 | –1 |
| People's Party (PP) | 1,267 | 10.92 | +1.98 | 0 | ±0 |
| Canarian United Left (IUC) | 629 | 5.42 | –2.21 | 0 | ±0 |
| Canarian Nationalist Federation (FNC) | 124 | 1.07 | New | 0 | ±0 |
| Centrist Union–Democratic and Social Centre (UC–CDS) | 22 | 0.19 | –0.13 | 0 | ±0 |
| Blank ballots | 95 | 0.82 | +0.18 | | |
| Total | 11,601 | | | 4 | ±0 |
| Valid votes | 11,601 | 99.21 | –0.45 | | |
| Invalid votes | 92 | 0.79 | +0.45 | | |
| Votes cast / turnout | 11,693 | 62.20 | –6.88 | | |
| Abstentions | 7,107 | 37.80 | +6.88 | | |
| Registered voters | 18,800 | | | | |

=== 1995 ===
Summary of the 28 May 1995 Parliament of the Canary Islands election results in La Gomera
| Parties and alliances | Popular vote | | | Seats | |
| Parties and alliances | Votes | % | ±pp | Total | +/− |
|---|---|---|---|---|---|
| Spanish Socialist Workers' Party (PSOE) | 4,701 | 46.95 | –7.95 | 2 | –1 |
| Canarian Coalition (CC)^{1} | 3,556 | 35.52 | +28.62 | 2 | +2 |
| People's Party (PP) | 895 | 8.94 | +5.19 | 0 | ±0 |
| Canarian United Left (IUC) | 764 | 7.63 | New | 0 | ±0 |
| Democratic and Social Centre–Centrist Union (CDS–UC) | 32 | 0.32 | –33.43 | 0 | –1 |
| Blank ballots | 64 | 0.64 | +0.16 | | |
| Total | 10,012 | | | 4 | ±0 |
| Valid votes | 10,012 | 99.66 | +0.11 | | |
| Invalid votes | 34 | 0.34 | –0.11 | | |
| Votes cast / turnout | 10,046 | 69.08 | –1.85 | | |
| Abstentions | 4,496 | 30.92 | +1.85 | | |
| Registered voters | 14,542 | | | | |
Sources
Footnotes: ^{1} Canarian Coalition results are compared to Canarian Initiative totals in the 1991 election.

=== 1991 ===
Summary of the 26 May 1991 Parliament of the Canary Islands election results in La Gomera
| Parties and alliances | Popular vote | | | Seats | |
| Parties and alliances | Votes | % | ±pp | Total | +/− |
|---|---|---|---|---|---|
| Spanish Socialist Workers' Party (PSOE) | 5,189 | 54.90 | –3.39 | 3 | ±0 |
| Democratic and Social Centre–Gomera Group of Independents (CDS–AGI) | 3,190 | 33.75 | +4.30 | 1 | ±0 |
| Canarian Initiative (ICAN)^{1} | 652 | 6.90 | +2.04 | 0 | ±0 |
| People's Party (PP)^{2} | 354 | 3.75 | –0.56 | 0 | ±0 |
| Workers' Socialist Party (PST) | 22 | 0.23 | New | 0 | ±0 |
| Blank ballots | 45 | 0.48 | –0.08 | | |
| Total | 9,452 | | | 4 | ±0 |
| Valid votes | 9,452 | 99.55 | +0.19 | | |
| Invalid votes | 43 | 0.45 | –0.19 | | |
| Votes cast / turnout | 9,495 | 70.93 | –1.10 | | |
| Abstentions | 3,891 | 29.07 | +1.10 | | |
| Registered voters | 13,386 | | | | |
Sources
Footnotes: ^{1} Canarian Initiative results are compared to United Canarian Left totals in the 1987 election.; ^{2} People's Party results are compared to People's Alliance totals in the 1987 election.

=== 1987 ===
Summary of the 10 June 1987 Parliament of the Canary Islands election results in La Gomera
| Parties and alliances | Popular vote | | | Seats | |
| Parties and alliances | Votes | % | ±pp | Total | +/− |
|---|---|---|---|---|---|
| Spanish Socialist Workers' Party (PSOE) | 5,169 | 58.29 | +19.10 | 3 | +1 |
| Democratic and Social Centre–Gomera Group of Independents (CDS–AGI)^{1} | 2,611 | 29.45 | –8.89 | 1 | –1 |
| United Canarian Left (ICU)^{2} | 431 | 4.86 | –2.40 | 0 | ±0 |
| People's Alliance (AP)^{3} | 382 | 4.31 | –10.89 | 0 | ±0 |
| Canarian Independent Groups (AIC) | 224 | 2.53 | New | 0 | ±0 |
| Blank ballots | 50 | 0.56 | +0.56 | | |
| Total | 8,867 | | | 4 | ±0 |
| Valid votes | 8,867 | 99.36 | +0.24 | | |
| Invalid votes | 57 | 0.64 | –0.24 | | |
| Votes cast / turnout | 8,924 | 72.03 | +6.96 | | |
| Abstentions | 3,465 | 27.97 | –6.96 | | |
| Registered voters | 12,389 | | | | |
Sources
Footnotes: ^{1} Democratic and Social Centre–Gomera Group of Independents results are compared to Gomera Group of Independents totals in the 1983 election.; ^{2} United Canarian Left results are compared to Communist Party of the Canaries totals in the 1983 election.; ^{3} People's Alliance results are compared to People's Coalition totals in the 1983 election.

=== 1983 ===
Summary of the 8 May 1983 Parliament of the Canary Islands election results in La Gomera
| Parties and alliances | Popular vote | | | Seats | |
| Parties and alliances | Votes | % | ±pp | Total | +/− |
|---|---|---|---|---|---|
| Spanish Socialist Workers' Party (PSOE) | 3,367 | 39.19 | n/a | 2 | n/a |
| Gomera Group of Independents (AGI) | 3,294 | 38.34 | n/a | 2 | n/a |
| People's Coalition (AP–PDP–UL) | 1,306 | 15.20 | n/a | 0 | n/a |
| Communist Party of the Canaries (PCC–PCE) | 624 | 7.26 | n/a | 0 | n/a |
| Blank ballots | 0 | 0.00 | n/a | | |
| Total | 8,591 | | | 4 | n/a |
| Valid votes | 8,591 | 99.12 | n/a | | |
| Invalid votes | 76 | 0.88 | n/a | | |
| Votes cast / turnout | 8,667 | 65.07 | n/a | | |
| Abstentions | 4,653 | 34.93 | n/a | | |
| Registered voters | 13,320 | | | | |

== Bibliography ==
- Government of the Canary Islands (November 1987). Resultados procesos electorales en Canarias. Elecciones Locales: Ayuntamientos y Cabildos (1979-1983-1987). Elecciones Autonómicas: Parlamento de Canarias (1983-1987) (PDF) (in Spanish). Las Palmas de Gran Canaria: Statistics and Documentation Center of the Canary Islands. pp. 203–270.
