= 2003 Canarian regional election =

Election in the Spanish region of the Canary Islands

- 25 May 2003

All 60 seats in the Parliament of the Canary Islands 31 seats needed for a majority
- Opinion polls
- Registered: 1,440,576 ▲4.9%
- Turnout: 930,449 (64.6%) ▲3.8 pp
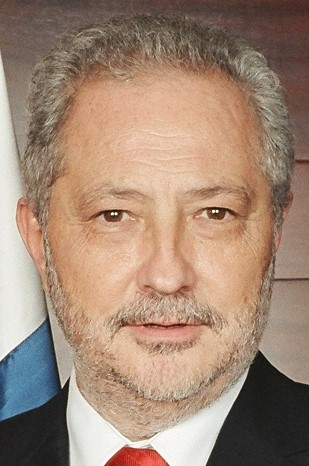

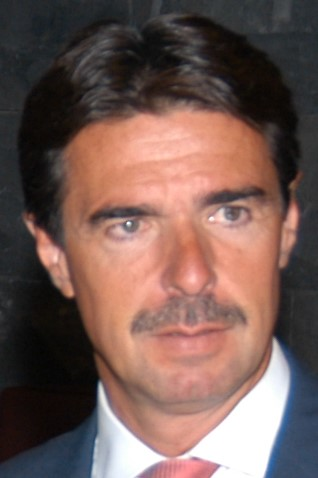

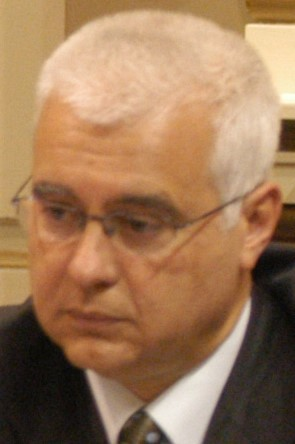

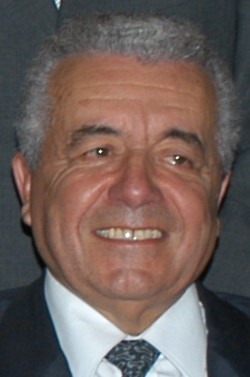
	First party	Second party	Third party
Leader	Adán Martín	José Manuel Soria	Juan Carlos Alemán
Party	CC	PP	PSOE
Leader since	2003	16 July 1999	2000
Leader's seat	Tenerife	Gran Canaria	Tenerife
Last election	26 seats, 37.3% (Note: Results for CC (36.9%, 24 seats) and AHI (0.3%, 2 seats) in the 1999 election.)	15 seats, 27.1%	19 seats, 24.0%
Seats won	23	17	17
Seat change	▼3	▲2	▼2
Popular vote	304,413	283,186	235,234
Percentage	32.9%	30.6%	25.4%
Swing	▼4.4 pp	▲3.5 pp	▲1.4 pp
	Fourth party
Leader	Lorenzo Olarte
Party	FNC
Leader since	2003
Leader's seat	Gran Canaria (lost)
Last election	0 seats, 4.8%
Seats won	3
Seat change	▲3
Popular vote	44,703
Percentage	4.8%
Swing	0.0 pp
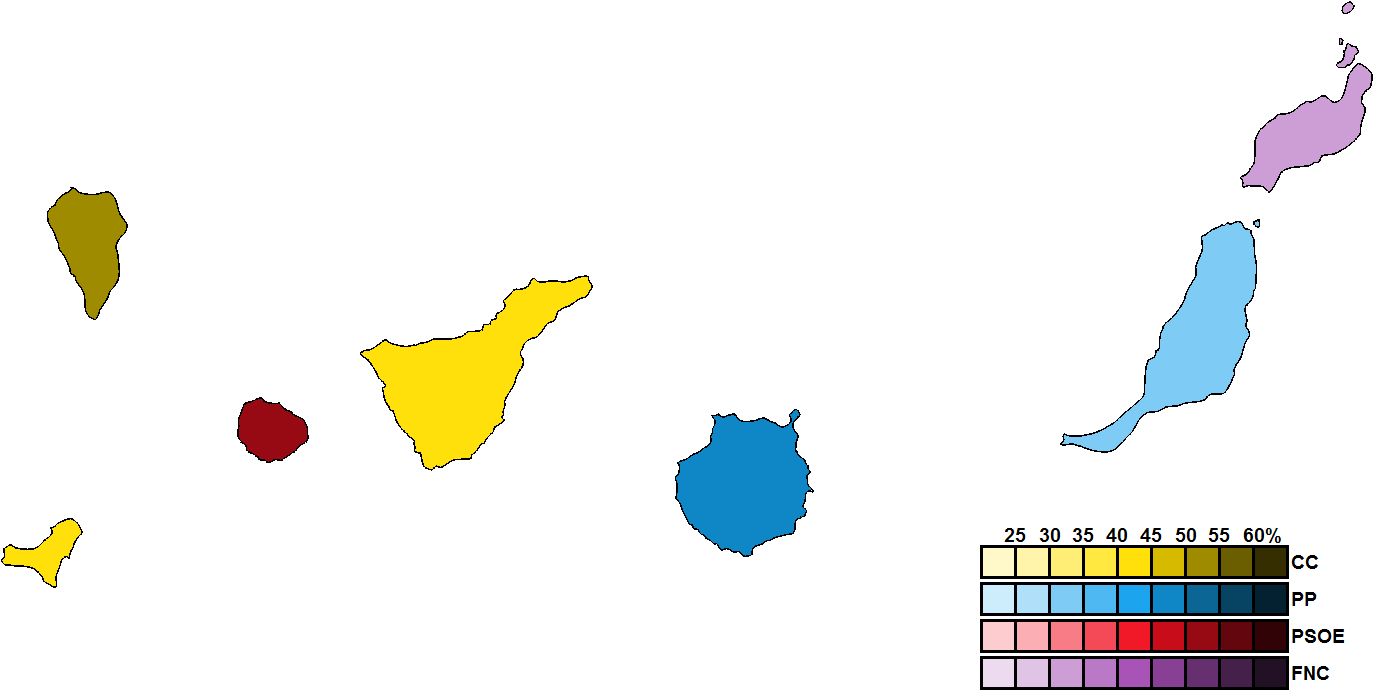
- Constituency results map for the Parliament of the Canary Islands
President before election
Román Rodríguez
ICAN (CC)
President after election
Adán Martín
AIC (CC)

A regional election was held in the Canary Islands on 25 May 2003 to elect the 6th Parliament of the autonomous community. All 60 seats in the Parliament were up for election. It was held concurrently with regional elections in twelve other autonomous communities and local elections all across Spain.

== Overview ==
Under the 1982 Statute of Autonomy, the Parliament of the Canary Islands was the unicameral legislature of the homonymous autonomous community, having legislative power in devolved matters, as well as the ability to grant or withdraw confidence from a regional president. The electoral and procedural rules were supplemented by national law provisions.

=== Date ===
The term of the Parliament of the Canary Islands expired four years after the date of its previous ordinary election, with election day being fixed for the fourth Sunday of May every four years. The election decree was required to be issued no later than 54 days before the scheduled election date and published on the following day in the Official Gazette of the Canaries (BOC). The previous election was held on 13 June 1999, setting the date for election day on the fourth Sunday of May four years later, which was 25 May 2003.

The Parliament of the Canary Islands could not be dissolved before the expiration date of parliament, except in the event of an investiture process failing to elect a regional president within a two-month period from the first ballot. In such a case, the Parliament was to be automatically dissolved and a snap election called, with elected lawmakers serving the remainder of its original four-year term.

The election to the Parliament of the Canary Islands was officially called on 1 April 2003 with the publication of the corresponding decree in the BOC, setting election day for 25 May.

=== Electoral system ===
Voting for the Parliament was based on universal suffrage, comprising all Spanish nationals over 18 years of age, registered in the Canary Islands and with full political rights, provided that they had not been deprived of the right to vote by a final sentence, nor were legally incapacitated.

The Parliament of the Canary Islands had a minimum of 50 and a maximum of 70 seats, with electoral provisions fixing its size at 60. All were elected in seven multi-member constituencies—corresponding to the islands of El Hierro, Fuerteventura, Gran Canaria, La Gomera, La Palma, Lanzarote and Tenerife, each of which was assigned a fixed number of seats—using the D'Hondt method and closed-list proportional voting, with a 30 percent-threshold of valid votes (including blank ballots) in each constituency or six percent regionally.

As a result of the aforementioned allocation, each Parliament constituency was entitled the following seats:

Seats	Constituencies
15	Gran Canaria, Tenerife
8	La Palma, Lanzarote
7	Fuerteventura
4	La Gomera
3	El Hierro

The law did not provide for by-elections to fill vacant seats; instead, any vacancies arising after the proclamation of candidates and during the legislative term were filled by the next candidates on the party lists or, when required, by designated substitutes.

=== Outgoing parliament ===
The table below shows the composition of the parliamentary groups in the chamber at the time of the election call.

Parliamentary composition in April 2003
Groups	Parties	Legislators	
Groups	Parties	Seats	Total
Canarian Coalition Parliamentary Group (CC)	AIC	16	24
Canarian Coalition Parliamentary Group (CC)	ICAN	3	24
Canarian Coalition Parliamentary Group (CC)	AM	3	24
Canarian Coalition Parliamentary Group (CC)	CCN	2	24
Canarian Socialist Parliamentary Group	PSOE	18	18
People's Parliamentary Group	PP	14	14
Mixed Parliamentary Group	AHI	2	2
Non-Inscrits	INDEP	1 (Note: Dolores Rodríguez, former PSOE legislator.)	1

== Parties and candidates ==
The electoral law allowed for parties and federations registered in the interior ministry, alliances and groupings of electors to present lists of candidates. Parties and federations intending to form an alliance were required to inform the relevant electoral commission within 10 days of the election call, whereas groupings of electors needed to secure the signature of at least one percent of the electorate in the constituencies for which they sought election, disallowing electors from signing for more than one list.

Below is a list of the main parties and alliances which contested the election:

Candidacy	Parties and alliances	Candidate	Ideology	Previous result		Gov.	Ref.
Candidacy	Parties and alliances	Candidate	Ideology	Vote %	Seats	Gov.	Ref.
CC	List: Canarian Independent Groups (AIC) – Tenerife Group of Independents (ATI) – La Palma Group of Independents (API) – Gomera Group of Independents (AGI); Nationalist Canarian Initiative (ICAN); Nationalist Canarian Centre (CCN); Majorera Assembly (AM); Independent Herrenian Group (AHI)	Adán Martín	Regionalism; Canarian nationalism Centrism	37.3%	26	Yes	
PSOE	List: Spanish Socialist Workers' Party (PSOE)	Juan Carlos Alemán	Social democracy	24.0%	19	No	
PP	List: People's Party (PP)	José Manuel Soria	Conservatism; Christian democracy	27.1%	15	No	
FNC	List: Canarian Nationalist Party (PNC); Canarian Union (UC); Lanzarote Independents Party (PIL); Independents of Fuerteventura (IF)	Lorenzo Olarte	Canarian nationalism	4.8%	0	No	

== Opinion polls ==
The tables below list opinion polling results in reverse chronological order, showing the most recent first and using the dates when the survey fieldwork was done, as opposed to the date of publication. Where the fieldwork dates are unknown, the date of publication is given instead. The highest percentage figure in each polling survey is displayed with its background shaded in the leading party's colour. If a tie ensues, this is applied to the figures with the highest percentages. The "Lead" column on the right shows the percentage-point difference between the parties with the highest percentages in a poll.

=== Voting intention estimates ===
The table below lists weighted voting intention estimates. Refusals are generally excluded from the party vote percentages, while question wording and the treatment of "don't know" responses and those not intending to vote may vary between polling organisations. When available, seat projections determined by the polling organisations are displayed below (or in place of) the percentages in a smaller font; 31 seats were required for an absolute majority in the Parliament of the Canary Islands.

Polling firm/Commissioner	Fieldwork date	Sample size	Turnout	CC	PP	PSOE	FNC	IUC	AHI	Lead
2003 regional election	25 May 2003	—N/a	64.6	32.9; 24	30.6; 15	25.4; 19	4.8; 0	1.3; 0	(Note: Within CC.)	2.3
CIS	22 Mar–28 Apr 2003	1,778	73.7	41.1; 29	22.1; 12	27.0; 17	0.6; 0	3.6; 0	0.4; 2	14.1
CIS	9 Sep–9 Oct 2002	499	74.2	33.8	32.5	21.4	–	2.2	–	1.3
Regional Government	28 Nov–23 Dec 2001	3,522	?	36.7; 24	27.4; 15	27.9; 19	1.1; 0	2.7; 0	0.2; 2	8.8
Regional Government	15 May–20 Jun 2001	3,551	?	37.5; 25	27.6; 16	25.1; 17	1.2; 0	2.8; 0	0.2; 2	9.9
Regional Government	27 Nov–30 Dec 2000	3,641	?	35.6; 24	28.4; 16	26.2; 18	–	–	0.3; 2	7.2
2000 general election	12 Mar 2000	—N/a	60.7	29.6	41.8	22.2	1.2 (Note: Results for PIL.)	2.4		12.2
1999 regional election	13 Jun 1999	—N/a	60.8	36.9; 24	27.1; 15	24.0; 19	4.8; 0	2.7; 0	0.3; 2	9.8

=== Voting preferences ===
The table below lists raw, unweighted voting preferences.

Polling firm/Commissioner	Fieldwork date	Sample size	CC	PP	PSOE	FNC	IUC	AHI	Question	X mark	Lead
2003 regional election (Note: Does not include non-resident citizens.)	25 May 2003	—N/a	21.5	20.4	16.8	3.1	0.9		—N/a	33.6	1.1
CIS	22 Mar–28 Apr 2003	1,778	22.5	12.3	17.6	0.4	2.1	0.3	33.5	7.2	4.9
CIS	9 Sep–9 Oct 2002	499	22.2	21.0	12.6	–	1.2	–	24.8	12.4	1.2
Regional Government	28 Nov–23 Dec 2001	3,522	17.2	18.2	16.7	0.7	2.8	0.1	26.1	11.1	1.0
Regional Government	15 May–20 Jun 2001	3,551	18.1	20.0	15.2	0.9	2.9	0.1	26.9	10.5	1.9
Regional Government	27 Nov–30 Dec 2000	3,641	17.9	21.9	14.7	0.8	2.8	0.1	23.7	9.9	4.0
Regional Government	10 May–20 Jun 2000	3,580	25.8	27.7	14.0	0.8	2.3	0.0	25.1	1.3	1.9
2000 general election	12 Mar 2000	—N/a	18.0	25.7	13.6	0.8	1.5		—N/a	38.4	7.7
1999 regional election	13 Jun 1999	—N/a	22.8	16.7	14.8	2.9	1.6	0.2	—N/a	38.2	6.1

=== Victory preferences ===
The table below lists opinion polling on the victory preferences for each party in the event of a regional election taking place.

Polling firm/Commissioner	Fieldwork date	Sample size	CC	PP	PSOE	FNC	IUC	AHI	Other/ None	Question	Lead
CIS	22 Mar–28 Apr 2003	1,778	27.9	16.5	22.0	0.3	3.5	0.3	2.0	27.6	5.9

=== Victory likelihood ===
The table below lists opinion polling on the perceived likelihood of victory for each party in the event of a regional election taking place.

Polling firm/Commissioner	Fieldwork date	Sample size	CC	PP	PSOE	FNC	IUC	AHI	Other/ None	Question	Lead
CIS	22 Mar–28 Apr 2003	1,778	38.2	14.0	11.8	0.1	0.4	0.0	0.1	35.5	24.2

=== Preferred President ===
The table below lists opinion polling on leader preferences to become president of the Canary Islands.

Polling firm/Commissioner	Fieldwork date	Sample size						Other/ None/ Not care	Question	Lead
Polling firm/Commissioner	Fieldwork date	Sample size	Martín CC	Soria PP	Alemán PSOE	Olarte FNC	Martínez IUC	Other/ None/ Not care	Question	Lead
CIS	22 Mar–28 Apr 2003	1,778	20.3	16.6	14.5	3.8	1.4	4.6	38.8	3.7

== Results ==
=== Overall ===
← Summary of the 25 May 2003 Parliament of the Canary Islands election results →
Parties and alliances	Popular vote			Seats	
Parties and alliances	Votes	%	±pp	Total	+/−
Canarian Coalition (CC)^{1}	304,413	32.90	−4.36	23	−3
People's Party (PP)	283,186	30.61	+3.48	17	+2
Spanish Socialist Workers' Party (PSOE)	235,234	25.42	+1.39	17	−2
Canarian Nationalist Federation (FNC)	44,703	4.83	+0.02	3	+3
The Greens of the Canaries (Verdes)	18,340	1.98	+0.52	0	±0
Canarian United Left (IUC)	12,128	1.31	−1.43	0	±0
Canarian Popular Alternative (APCa)	6,737	0.73	New	0	±0
25 May Citizens' Alternative (AC25M)	2,719	0.29	New	0	±0
Communist Party of the Canarian People (PCPC)	1,776	0.19	New	0	±0
Humanist Party (PH)	1,322	0.14	−0.02	0	±0
Lanzarote Assembly–PdA–PCL (AC–PdA–PCL)	964	0.10	New	0	±0
Tenerife Union (UTI)	571	0.06	New	0	±0
Pensionist Assembly of the Canaries (TPC)	449	0.05	−0.03	0	±0
Party of The People (LG)	448	0.05	New	0	±0
National Democracy (DN)	409	0.04	New	0	±0
Centrist Union (UC)	43	0.00	−0.53	0	±0
Blank ballots	11,806	1.28	−0.23		
Total	925,248			60	±0
Valid votes	925,248	99.44	+0.02		
Invalid votes	5,201	0.56	−0.02		
Votes cast / turnout	930,449	64.59	+3.79		
Abstentions	510,127	35.41	−3.79		
Registered voters	1,440,576				
Sources
Footnotes: ^{1} Canarian Coalition results are compared to the combined totals of Canarian Coalition and Independent Herrenian Group in the 1999 election.

Popular vote
CC	32.90%
PP	30.61%
PSOE	25.42%
FNC	4.83%
Verdes	1.98%
IUC	1.31%
Others	1.67%
Blank ballots	1.28%

Seats
CC	38.33%
PP	28.33%
PSOE	28.33%
FNC	5.00%

=== Distribution by constituency ===
Constituency	CC		PP		PSOE		FNC	
Constituency	%	S	%	S	%	S	%	S
El Hierro	45.0	2	24.8	1	21.6	−	7.1	−
Fuerteventura	30.2	2	32.5	3	25.4	2	7.1	−
Gran Canaria	21.6	4	47.4	8	20.6	3	4.6	−
La Gomera	34.8	1	7.3	−	54.4	3	1.0	−
La Palma	50.7	4	23.4	2	23.1	2		
Lanzarote	19.5	2	17.7	1	20.9	2	30.4	3
Tenerife	44.3	8	15.5	2	30.6	5	2.7	−
Total	32.9	23	30.6	17	25.4	17	4.8	3

== Aftermath ==
=== Government formation ===
Investiture; Nomination of Adán Martín (AIC)
Ballot →	4 July 2003
Required majority →	31 out of 60
Yes: • CC (23); • PP (17); • PIL (2)	42 / 60
No: • PSOE (17)	17 / 60
Abstentions	0 / 60
Absentees: • PIL (1)	1 / 60

== Bibliography ==
- Ley Orgánica 10/1982, de 10 de agosto, de Estatuto de Autonomía de Canarias (Organic Law 10/1982). Official State Gazette (in Spanish). 10 August 1982 [version as of 2 July 2002]. BOE-A-1982-20821.
- Ley Orgánica 5/1985, de 19 de junio, del Régimen Electoral General (Organic Law 5/1985). Official State Gazette (in Spanish). 19 June 1985 [version as of 11 March 2003]. BOE-A-1985-11672.
- Ley 7/2003, de 20 de marzo, de Elecciones al Parlamento de Canarias (Law 7/2003). Official State Gazette (in Spanish). 20 March 2003 [version as of 24 March 2003]. BOE-A-2003-7685.
- Decreto 52/2003, de 31 de marzo, del Presidente de la Comunidad Autónoma de Canarias, por el que se convocan elecciones al Parlamento de Canarias (PDF) (Decree 52/2003). Official Gazette of the Canaries (in Spanish). 31 March 2003.
