= 1995 Canarian regional election =

Election in the Spanish region of the Canary Islands

- 28 May 1995

All 60 seats in the Parliament of the Canary Islands 31 seats needed for a majority
- Opinion polls
- Registered: 1,248,575 ▲10.0%
- Turnout: 801,607 (64.2%) ▲2.5 pp
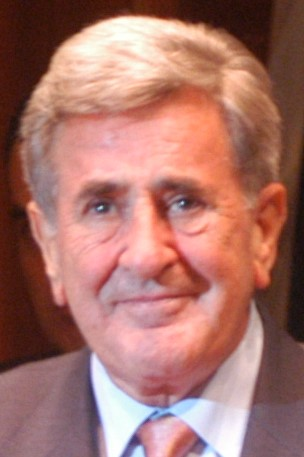

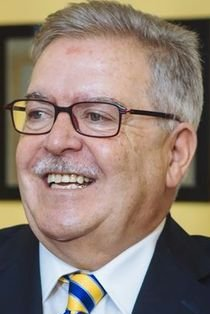

	First party	Second party	Third party
Leader	Manuel Hermoso	José Miguel Bravo de Laguna	Augusto Brito
Party	CC	PP	PSOE
Leader since	1991	1991	11 February 1995
Leader's seat	Tenerife	Gran Canaria	Tenerife
Last election	17 seats, 34.1% (Note: Results for AIC (20.1%, 10 seats)—not including Fuerteventura and Lanzarote—ICAN (12.2%, 5 seats)—not including El Hierro—PNC (1.1%, 0 seats) and AM (0.7%, 2 seats) in the 1991 election.)	6 seats, 12.8%	23 seats, 33.0%
Seats won	21	18	16
Seat change	▲4	▲12	▼7
Popular vote	261,424	247,609	183,969
Percentage	32.8%	31.1%	23.1%
Swing	▼1.3 pp	▲18.3 pp	▼9.9 pp
	Fourth party	Fifth party
Leader	Onelio Ramos	Juan Padrón Morales
Party	PCN	AHI
Leader since	1995	1983
Leader's seat	Gran Canaria	El Hierro
Last election	6 seats, 2.6% (Note: Results for AIC in Fuerteventura and Lanzarote in the 1991 election.)	1 seat, 0.2%
Seats won	4	1
Seat change	▼2	0
Popular vote	23,914	2,105
Percentage	3.0%	0.3%
Swing	▲0.4 pp	▲0.1 pp
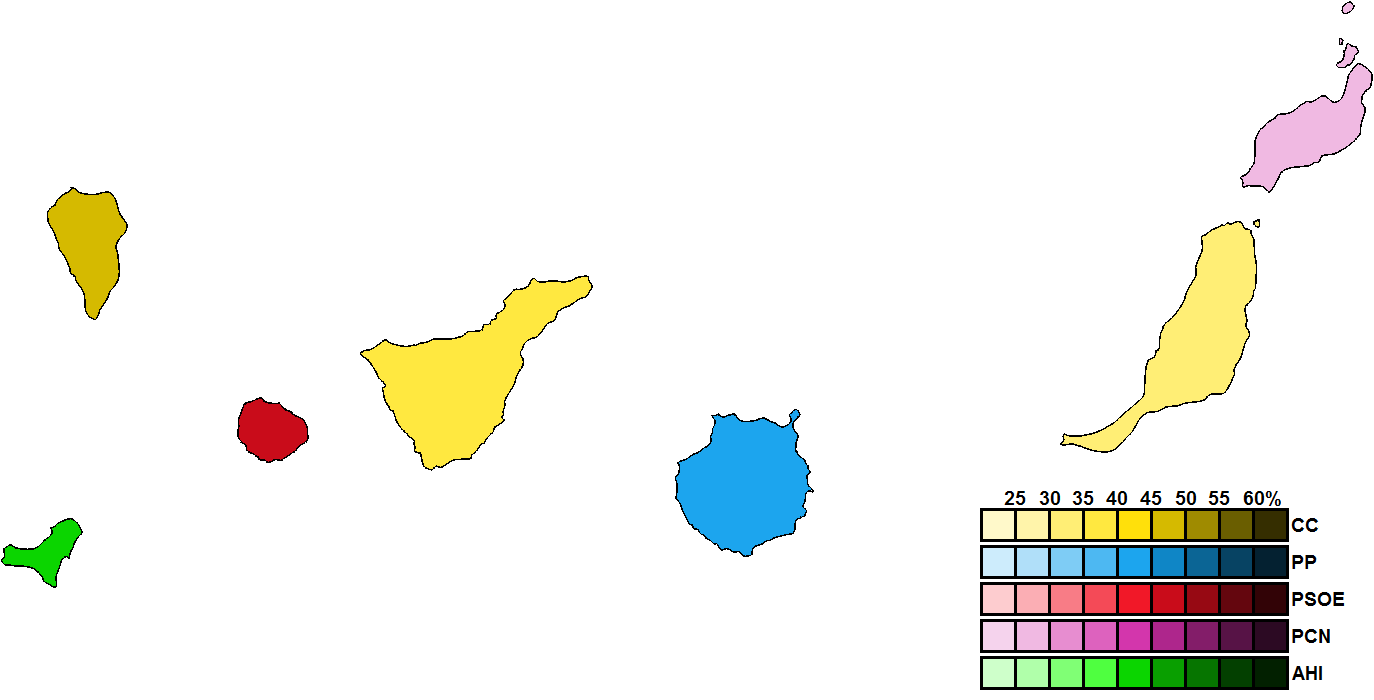
- Constituency results map for the Parliament of the Canary Islands
President before election
Manuel Hermoso
AIC (CC)
President after election
Manuel Hermoso
AIC (CC)

A regional election was held in the Canary Islands on 28 May 1995 to elect the 4th Parliament of the autonomous community. All 60 seats in the Parliament were up for election. It was held concurrently with regional elections in twelve other autonomous communities and local elections all across Spain.

== Overview ==
Under the 1982 Statute of Autonomy, the Parliament of the Canary Islands was the unicameral legislature of the homonymous autonomous community, having legislative power in devolved matters, as well as the ability to grant or withdraw confidence from a regional president. The electoral and procedural rules were supplemented by national law provisions.

=== Date ===
The term of the Parliament of the Canary Islands expired four years after the date of its previous ordinary election, with election day being fixed for the fourth Sunday of May every four years. The election decree was required to be issued no later than 54 days before the scheduled election date and published on the following day in the Official Gazette of the Canaries (BOC). The previous election was held on 26 May 1991, setting the date for election day on the fourth Sunday of May four years later, which was 28 May 1995.

The Parliament of the Canary Islands could not be dissolved before the expiration date of parliament, except in the event of an investiture process failing to elect a regional president within a two-month period from the first ballot. In such a case, the Parliament was to be automatically dissolved and a snap election called, with elected lawmakers serving the remainder of its original four-year term.

The election to the Parliament of the Canary Islands was officially called on 4 April 1995 with the publication of the corresponding decree in the BOC, setting election day for 28 May.

=== Electoral system ===
Voting for the Parliament was based on universal suffrage, comprising all Spanish nationals over 18 years of age, registered in the Canary Islands and with full political rights, provided that they had not been deprived of the right to vote by a final sentence, nor were legally incapacitated.

The Parliament of the Canary Islands had a minimum of 50 and a maximum of 70 seats, with electoral provisions fixing its size at 60. All were elected in seven multi-member constituencies—corresponding to the islands of El Hierro, Fuerteventura, Gran Canaria, La Gomera, La Palma, Lanzarote and Tenerife, each of which was assigned a fixed number of seats—using the D'Hondt method and closed-list proportional voting, with a 20 percent-threshold of valid votes (including blank ballots) in each constituency or three percent regionally.

As a result of the aforementioned allocation, each Parliament constituency was entitled the following seats:

Seats	Constituencies
15	Gran Canaria, Tenerife
8	La Palma, Lanzarote
7	Fuerteventura
4	La Gomera
3	El Hierro

The law did not provide for by-elections to fill vacant seats; instead, any vacancies arising after the proclamation of candidates and during the legislative term were filled by the next candidates on the party lists or, when required, by designated substitutes.

=== Outgoing parliament ===
The table below shows the composition of the parliamentary groups in the chamber at the time of the election call.

Parliamentary composition in April 1995
Groups	Parties	Legislators	
Groups	Parties	Seats	Total
Canarian Socialist Parliamentary Group	PSOE	23	23
Canarian Independent Groups–AIC Parliamentary Group	AIC	10	16
Canarian Independent Groups–AIC Parliamentary Group	PIL	4	16
Canarian Independent Groups–AIC Parliamentary Group	IF	2	16
Centrist Parliamentary Group	CCI	6	7
Centrist Parliamentary Group	AGI	1	7
People's Parliamentary Group	PP	6	6
Canarian Left Parliamentary Group (ICAN)	ICAN	5	5
Mixed Parliamentary Group	AM	2	3
Mixed Parliamentary Group	AHI	1	3

== Parties and candidates ==
The electoral law allowed for parties and federations registered in the interior ministry, alliances and groupings of electors to present lists of candidates. Parties and federations intending to form an alliance were required to inform the relevant electoral commission within 10 days of the election call, whereas groupings of electors needed to secure the signature of at least one percent of the electorate in the constituencies for which they sought election, disallowing electors from signing for more than one list.

Below is a list of the main parties and alliances which contested the election:

Candidacy	Parties and alliances	Candidate	Ideology	Previous result		Gov.	Ref.
Candidacy	Parties and alliances	Candidate	Ideology	Vote %	Seats	Gov.	Ref.
PSOE	List: Spanish Socialist Workers' Party (PSOE)	Augusto Brito	Social democracy	33.0%	23	No	
CC	List: Canarian Independent Groups (AIC) – Tenerife Group of Independents (ATI) – La Palma Group of Independents (API) – Gomera Group of Independents (AGI); Nationalist Canarian Initiative (ICAN); Nationalist Canarian Centre (CCN); Canarian Nationalist Party (PNC); Majorera Assembly (AM)	Manuel Hermoso	Regionalism; Canarian nationalism Centrism	34.1%	17	Yes	
CDS–UC	List: Democratic and Social Centre–Centrist Union (CDS–UC)	Juan Bautista Ruiz	Centrism; Liberalism	14.4%	7	No	
PP	List: People's Party (PP)	José Miguel Bravo de Laguna	Conservatism; Christian democracy	12.8%	6	No	
PCN	List: Party of Gran Canaria (PGC); Lanzarote Independents Party (PIL); Independents of Fuerteventura (IF)	Onelio Ramos	Canarian nationalism	2.6%	6	No	
AHI	List: Independent Herrenian Group (AHI)	Juan Padrón Morales	Insularism; Canarian nationalism Centrism	0.2%	1	No	
IUC	List: Canarian United Left (IUC) – Communist Party of the Canaries (PCC) – Socialist Action Party (PASOC) – Republican Left (IR)	Segundo Martínez	Socialism; Communism	Did not contest		No	

== Opinion polls ==
The tables below list opinion polling results in reverse chronological order, showing the most recent first and using the dates when the survey fieldwork was done, as opposed to the date of publication. Where the fieldwork dates are unknown, the date of publication is given instead. The highest percentage figure in each polling survey is displayed with its background shaded in the leading party's colour. If a tie ensues, this is applied to the figures with the highest percentages. The "Lead" column on the right shows the percentage-point difference between the parties with the highest percentages in a poll.

=== Voting intention estimates ===
The table below lists weighted voting intention estimates. Refusals are generally excluded from the party vote percentages, while question wording and the treatment of "don't know" responses and those not intending to vote may vary between polling organisations. When available, seat projections determined by the polling organisations are displayed below (or in place of) the percentages in a smaller font; 31 seats were required for an absolute majority in the Parliament of the Canary Islands.

Color key:

Exit poll

Polling firm/Commissioner	Fieldwork date	Sample size	Turnout	PSOE	AIC	CDS	PP	ICAN	AM	AHI	CC	IUC	PCN	Lead
1995 regional election	28 May 1995	—N/a	64.2	23.1; 16	(Note: Within CC.)	0.7; 0	31.1; 18			0.3; 1	32.8; 21	5.1; 0	3.0; 4	1.7
Eco Consulting/RTVE	28 May 1995	?	?	22.0; 17/19		–	31.9; 19/21			–	30.1; 16/18	5.3; 3	–	1.8
Demoscopia/El País	10–15 May 1995	1,452	?	16.8; 13/14		3.3; 0	33.9; 19/20			0.5; 2	31.0; 19	9.8; 4	–	2.9
CIS (Note: "Preelectoral Comunidad Autónoma de Canarias (Estudio 2163. Abril-Mayo 1995)". CIS (in Spanish). 10 May 1995. Archived from the original on 25 May 2019.)	24 Apr–10 May 1995	999	69.4	18.4		–	31.4			–	38.8	6.0	–	7.4
1994 EP election	12 Jun 1994	—N/a	49.9	24.8		0.7	43.9			–	18.8	8.3	–	19.1
1993 general election	6 Jun 1993	—N/a	68.9	29.9		1.2	33.9			–	25.6	5.0	–	4.0
1991 regional election	26 May 1991	—N/a	61.7	33.0; 23	22.7; 16	14.4; 7	12.8; 6	12.2; 5	0.7; 2	0.2; 1	–	–	–	10.3

=== Voting preferences ===
The table below lists raw, unweighted voting preferences.

Polling firm/Commissioner	Fieldwork date	Sample size	PSOE	AIC	CDS	PP	ICAN	AM	AHI	CC	IUC	PCN	Question	X mark	Lead
1995 regional election (Note: Does not include non-resident citizens.)	28 May 1995	—N/a	14.7		0.4	19.8			0.2	21.0	3.3	1.9	—N/a	35.0	1.2
CIS	24 Apr–10 May 1995	999	14.5		0.5	20.4			–	24.8	5.2	–	25.7	4.8	4.4
CIS	2–17 Mar 1995	995	14.2		0.9	23.2			–	20.9	7.1	–	22.9	7.2	2.3
1994 EP election	12 Jun 1994	—N/a	12.4		0.4	22.0			–	9.4	4.2	–	—N/a	49.8	9.6
CIS	5–22 May 1994	965	12.8		1.7	22.8			0.2	8.3	7.1	–	29.0	7.0	10.0
1993 general election	6 Jun 1993	—N/a	20.5		0.8	23.4			–	17.6	3.4	–	—N/a	30.7	2.9
CIS	8–21 Nov 1992	1,085	21.9	11.6	2.1	9.1	8.8	0.5	0.1	–	–	–	37.4	7.8	10.3
1991 regional election	26 May 1991	—N/a	20.3	13.9	8.8	8.0	7.8	0.4	0.1	–	–	–	—N/a	38.0	6.4

=== Victory preferences ===
The table below lists opinion polling on the victory preferences for each party in the event of a regional election taking place.

Polling firm/Commissioner	Fieldwork date	Sample size	PSOE	PP	CC	IUC	Other/ None	Question	Lead
CIS	24 Apr–10 May 1995	999	17.8	23.5	30.7	–	0.1	28.0	7.2
CIS	2–17 Mar 1995	995	17.0	27.0	32.2	–	–	23.8	5.2
CIS	5–22 May 1994	965	14.5	24.6	23.9	8.8	4.2	23.9	0.7

=== Victory likelihood ===
The table below lists opinion polling on the perceived likelihood of victory for each party in the event of a regional election taking place.

Polling firm/Commissioner	Fieldwork date	Sample size	PSOE	PP	CC	Other/ None	Question	Lead
CIS	24 Apr–10 May 1995	999	12.1	27.9	23.1	–	37.0	4.8
CIS	2–17 Mar 1995	995	11.8	28.4	26.0	–	33.8	2.4

=== Preferred President ===
The table below lists opinion polling on leader preferences to become president of the Canary Islands.

Polling firm/Commissioner	Fieldwork date	Sample size				Other/ None/ Not care	Question	Lead
Polling firm/Commissioner	Fieldwork date	Sample size	Brito PSOE	Bravo de Laguna PP	Hermoso CC	Other/ None/ Not care	Question	Lead
CIS	24 Apr–10 May 1995	999	11.2	17.1	29.4	4.3	38.0	12.3
CIS	2–17 Mar 1995	995	8.5	17.7	27.3	3.6	42.8	9.6

== Results ==
=== Overall ===
← Summary of the 28 May 1995 Parliament of the Canary Islands election results →
Parties and alliances	Popular vote			Seats	
Parties and alliances	Votes	%	±pp	Total	+/−
Canarian Coalition (CC)^{1}	261,424	32.80	−1.33	21	+4
People's Party (PP)	247,609	31.07	+18.24	18	+12
Spanish Socialist Workers' Party (PSOE)	183,969	23.08	−9.95	16	−7
Canarian United Left (IUC)	40,614	5.10	New	0	±0
Nationalist Canarian Platform (PCN)^{2}	23,914	3.00	+0.43	4	−2
Coalition for Gran Canaria (CGC)	10,964	1.38	New	0	±0
Democratic and Social Centre–Centrist Union (CDS–UC)	5,340	0.67	−13.74	0	−7
National Congress of the Canaries (CNC)	2,964	0.37	New	0	±0
Popular Front of the Canary Islands–Awañac (FREPIC–Awañac)	2,436	0.31	−0.28	0	±0
Independent Herrenian Group (AHI)	2,105	0.26	+0.05	1	±0
Tenerife Assembly (ATF)	1,600	0.20	New	0	±0
Humanist Platform (PH)^{3}	1,561	0.20	+0.04	0	±0
Green Left of the Canary Islands (Izegzawen)	1,357	0.17	New	0	±0
Communist Party of the Canarian People (PCPC)	1,251	0.16	New	0	±0
Party of The People (LG)	625	0.08	−0.13	0	±0
Nationalist Canarian Initiative (ICAN)^{4}	248	0.03	−0.03	0	±0
Blank ballots	9,078	1.14	+0.37		
Total	797,059			60	±0
Valid votes	797,059	99.43	+0.16		
Invalid votes	4,548	0.57	−0.16		
Votes cast / turnout	801,607	64.20	+2.51		
Abstentions	446,968	35.80	−2.51		
Registered voters	1,248,575				
Sources
Footnotes: ^{1} Canarian Coalition results are compared to the combined totals of Canarian Independent Groups in Gran Canaria, La Palma and Tenerife, Canarian Initiative, Canarian Nationalist Party and Majorera Assembly in the 1991 election, not including Canarian Initiative results in El Hierro.; ^{2} Nationalist Canarian Platform results are compared to Canarian Independent Groups totals in Fuerteventura and La Palma.; ^{3} Humanist Platform results are compared to The Greens Ecologist–Humanist List totals in the 1991 election.; ^{4} Nationalist Canarian Initiative results are compared to Canarian Initiative totals in El Hierro in the 1991 election. Canarian Coalition and its member parties, except for Nationalist Canarian Initiative, declined to run in El Hierro in order to respect Independent Herrenian Group's list there.

Popular vote
CC	32.80%
PP	31.07%
PSOE	23.08%
IUC	5.10%
PCN	3.00%
CGC	1.38%
AHI	0.26%
Others	2.15%
Blank ballots	1.14%

Seats
CC	35.00%
PP	30.00%
PSOE	26.67%
PCN	6.67%
AHI	1.67%

=== Distribution by constituency ===
Constituency	CC		PP		PSOE		PNC		AHI	
Constituency	%	S	%	S	%	S	%	S	%	S
El Hierro			26.7	1	23.0	1			43.0	1
Fuerteventura	31.3	2	26.5	2	26.9	2	10.5	1		
Gran Canaria	27.5	5	40.2	7	18.0	3	3.3	−		
La Gomera	35.5	2	8.9	−	47.0	2				
La Palma	45.6	4	20.0	2	27.4	2				
Lanzarote	17.1	1	19.0	2	25.2	2	29.8	3		
Tenerife	39.2	7	24.6	4	27.0	4				
Total	32.8	21	31.1	18	23.1	16	3.0	4	0.3	1

== Aftermath ==
=== Government formation ===
Investiture; Nomination of Manuel Hermoso (AIC)
Ballot →	11 July 1995
Required majority →	31 out of 60
Yes: • CC (21); • PP (17); • AHI (1)	39 / 60
No: • PSOE (16)	16 / 60
Abstentions: • PCN (4)	4 / 60
Absentees: • PP (1)	1 / 60

== Bibliography ==
- Ley Orgánica 10/1982, de 10 de agosto, de Estatuto de Autonomía de Canarias (Organic Law 10/1982). Official State Gazette (in Spanish). 10 August 1982 [version as of 16 August 1982]. BOE-A-1982-20821.
- Ley Orgánica 5/1985, de 19 de junio, del Régimen Electoral General (Organic Law 5/1985). Official State Gazette (in Spanish). 19 June 1985 [version as of 24 March 1995]. BOE-A-1985-11672.
- Ley 3/1987, de 3 de abril, de medidas urgentes en materia electoral (Law 3/1987). Official State Gazette (in Spanish). 3 April 1987. BOE-A-1987-9084.
- Ley 2/1991, de 18 de marzo, de modificación de determinados artículos de la Ley Territorial 3/1987, de 3 de abril, de medidas urgentes en materia electoral (Law 2/1991). Official State Gazette (in Spanish). 18 March 1991. BOE-A-1991-8593.
- Decreto 68/1995, de 3 de abril, del Presidente de la Comunidad Autónoma de Canarias, por el que se convocan elecciones al Parlamento de Canarias (PDF) (Decree 68/1995). Official Gazette of the Canaries (in Spanish). 3 April 1995.
