= El Hierro (Parliament of the Canary Islands constituency) =

Coordinates: 27°45′N 18°0′W

- Parliament of the Canary Islands; Electoral constituency
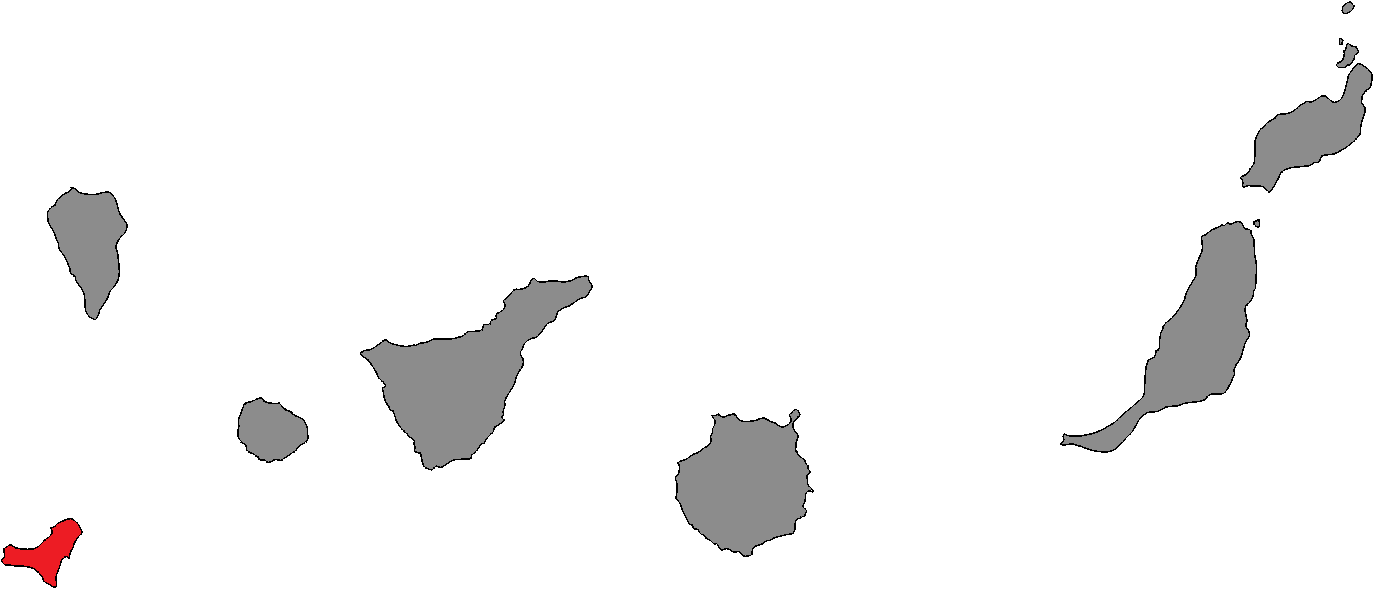
- Location of El Hierro within the Canary Islands
- Island: El Hierro
- Autonomous community: Canary Islands
- Population: ▲11,806 (2024)
- Electorate: ▲11,190 (2023)
- Major settlements: Valverde

Current constituency
- Created: 1983
- Seats: 3
- Members: PSOE (1); AHI (1); PP (1)

El Hierro is one of the seven constituencies (Spanish: circunscripciones) represented in the Parliament of the Canary Islands, the regional legislature of the Autonomous Community of the Canary Islands. The constituency currently elects 3 deputies. Its boundaries correspond to those of the island of El Hierro. The electoral system uses the D'Hondt method and closed-list proportional representation, with a minimum threshold of fifteen percent in the constituency or four percent regionally.

== Electoral system ==
The constituency was created as per the Statute of Autonomy of the Canary Islands of 1982 and was first contested in the 1983 regional election. The Statute provides for the seven main islands in the Canarian archipelago—El Hierro, Fuerteventura, Gran Canaria, La Gomera, La Palma, Lanzarote and Tenerife—to be established as multi-member districts in the Parliament of the Canary Islands. Each constituency is allocated a fixed number of seats: 3 for El Hierro, 8 for Fuerteventura—7 until 2018—15 for Gran Canaria, 4 for La Gomera, 8 for La Palma, 8 for Lanzarote and 15 for Tenerife.

Voting is on the basis of universal suffrage, which comprises all nationals over eighteen, registered in the Canary Islands and in full enjoyment of their political rights. Amendments to the electoral law in 2011 required for Canarian citizens abroad to apply for voting before being permitted to vote, a system known as "begged" or expat vote (Spanish: Voto rogado) which was abolished in 2022. Seats are elected using the D'Hondt method and a closed list proportional representation, with an electoral threshold of 15 percent of valid votes—which includes blank ballots; until a 1997 reform, the threshold was set at 20 percent; between 1997 and 2018, it was set at 30 percent—being applied in each constituency. Alternatively, parties can also enter the seat distribution as long as they reach four percent regionally—three percent until 1997, six percent between 1997 and 2018.

The electoral law allows for parties and federations registered in the interior ministry, coalitions and groupings of electors to present lists of candidates. Parties and federations intending to form a coalition ahead of an election are required to inform the relevant Electoral Commission within ten days of the election call—fifteen before 1985—whereas groupings of electors need to secure the signature of at least one percent of the electorate in the constituencies for which they seek election—one-thousandth of the electorate, with a compulsory minimum of 500 signatures, until 1985—disallowing electors from signing for more than one list of candidates.

== Deputies ==
Deputies 1983–present
Key to parties PSOE AHI PP CP
Cortes	Election	Distribution
1st	1983	1 / 1 / 1
2nd	1987	1 / 2
3rd	1991	1 / 1 / 1
4th	1995	1 / 1 / 1
5th	1999	1 / 2
6th	2003	2 / 1
7th	2007	1 / 2
8th	2011	1 / 1 / 1
9th	2015	1 / 2
10th	2019	1 / 1 / 1
11th	2023	1 / 1 / 1

== Regional elections ==
=== 2023 ===
Summary of the 28 May 2023 Parliament of the Canary Islands election results in El Hierro
Parties and alliances	Popular vote			Seats	
Parties and alliances	Votes	%	±pp	Total	+/−
Spanish Socialist Workers' Party (PSOE)	1,677	26.51	–5.04	1	±0
Independent Herrenian Group (AHI)^{1}	1,660	26.25	–14.19	1	±0
People's Party (PP)	1,279	20.22	+2.04	1	±0
Herrenian Assembly (AH)	1,089	17.22	New	0	±0
Gather Sustainable Canaries (Reunir)	182	2.88	New	0	±0
United Yes We Can (Podemos–IUC–SSP)^{2}	158	2.50	–2.13	0	±0
Vox (Vox)	104	1.64	New	0	±0
Seniors in Action (3e)	69	1.09	New	0	±0
Blank ballots	107	1.69	+0.17		
Total	6,325			3	±0
Valid votes	6,325	97.68	–0.77		
Invalid votes	150	2.32	+0.77		
Votes cast / turnout	6,475	57.86	–1.92		
Abstentions	4,715	42.14	+1.92		
Registered voters	11,190				
Sources
Footnotes: ^{1} Independent Herrenian Group results are compared to the combined totals of Independent Herrenian Group–Canarian Coalition and New Canaries in the 2019 election.; ^{2} United Yes We Can results are compared to the Canarian United Left totals in the 2019 election.

=== 2019 ===
Summary of the 26 May 2019 Parliament of the Canary Islands election results in El Hierro
Parties and alliances	Popular vote			Seats	
Parties and alliances	Votes	%	±pp	Total	+/−
Independent Herrenian Group–Canarian Coalition (AHI–CCa)	2,264	35.39	–6.38	1	–1
Spanish Socialist Workers' Party (PSOE)	2,018	31.55	+9.43	1	±0
People's Party (PP)	1,163	18.18	+1.05	1	+1
New Canaries (NCa)	323	5.05	–1.44	0	±0
Canarian United Left (IUC)^{1}	296	4.63	+2.51	0	±0
Citizens–Party of the Citizenry (Cs)	236	3.69	+2.28	0	±0
Blank ballots	97	1.52	+0.10		
Total	6,397			3	±0
Valid votes	6,397	98.45	+0.14		
Invalid votes	101	1.55	–0.14		
Votes cast / turnout	6,498	59.78	+2.32		
Abstentions	4,371	40.22	–2.32		
Registered voters	10,869				
Sources
Footnotes: ^{1} Canarian United Left results are compared to Canaries Decides totals in the 2015 election.

=== 2015 ===
Summary of the 24 May 2015 Parliament of the Canary Islands election results in El Hierro
Parties and alliances	Popular vote			Seats	
Parties and alliances	Votes	%	±pp	Total	+/−
Canarian Coalition–Independent Herrenian Group (CCa–AHI)	2,521	41.77	+6.10	2	+1
Spanish Socialist Workers' Party (PSOE)	1,335	22.12	–11.75	1	±0
People's Party (PP)	1,034	17.13	–8.15	0	–1
We Can (Podemos)	403	6.68	New	0	±0
New Canaries (NCa)	392	6.49	New	0	±0
Canaries Decides (IpH–IUC–LV–ALTER)^{1}	128	2.12	–1.14	0	±0
Citizens–Party of the Citizenry (C's)	85	1.41	New	0	±0
Animalist Party Against Mistreatment of Animals (PACMA)	46	0.76	New	0	±0
Movement for the Unity of the Canarian People (MUPC)	6	0.10	–0.18	0	±0
Blank ballots	86	1.42	–0.21		
Total	6,036			3	±0
Valid votes	6,036	98.31	+0.01		
Invalid votes	104	1.69	–0.01		
Votes cast / turnout	6,140	57.46	–2.68		
Abstentions	4,545	42.54	+2.68		
Registered voters	10,685				
Sources
Footnotes: ^{1} Canaries Decides results are compared to the combined totals of El Hierro Initiative–Canarian United Left and The Greens in the 2011 election.

=== 2011 ===
Summary of the 22 May 2011 Parliament of the Canary Islands election results in El Hierro
Parties and alliances	Popular vote			Seats	
Parties and alliances	Votes	%	±pp	Total	+/−
Independent Herrenian Group–Canarian Coalition (AHI–CC)^{1}	2,163	35.67	–17.66	1	–1
Spanish Socialist Workers' Party (PSOE)	2,054	33.87	+10.35	1	±0
People's Party (PP)	1,533	25.28	+5.48	1	+1
El Hierro Initiative–Canarian United Left (IpH–IUC)	122	2.01	New	0	±0
The Greens (Verdes)	76	1.25	–0.13	0	±0
Movement for the Unity of the Canarian People (MUPC)	17	0.28	New	0	±0
Blank ballots	99	1.63	+0.43		
Total	6,064			3	±0
Valid votes	6,064	98.30	–1.21		
Invalid votes	105	1.70	+1.21		
Votes cast / turnout	6,169	60.14	–2.49		
Abstentions	4,088	39.86	+2.49		
Registered voters	10,257				
Sources
Footnotes: ^{1} Independent Herrenian Group–Canarian Coalition results are compared to the combined totals of Canarian Coalition–Independent Herrenian Group, Canarian Nationalist Party and Canarian Centre in the 2007 election.

=== 2007 ===
Summary of the 27 May 2007 Parliament of the Canary Islands election results in El Hierro
Parties and alliances	Popular vote			Seats	
Parties and alliances	Votes	%	±pp	Total	+/−
Canarian Coalition–Independent Herrenian Group (CC–AHI)	2,973	47.06	+2.10	2	±0
Spanish Socialist Workers' Party (PSOE)	1,486	23.52	+1.96	1	+1
People's Party (PP)	1,251	19.80	–5.04	0	–1
Canarian Nationalist Party (PNC)^{1}	244	3.86	–3.23	0	±0
Canarian Centre (CCN)	152	2.41	New	0	±0
The Greens (Verdes)	87	1.38	New	0	±0
Canarian Popular Alternative–Citizens' Alternative 25 May (APCa–AC25M)	49	0.78	New	0	±0
Blank ballots	76	1.20	–0.35		
Total	6,318			3	±0
Valid votes	6,318	99.51	+0.41		
Invalid votes	31	0.49	–0.41		
Votes cast / turnout	6,349	62.63	–6.65		
Abstentions	3,788	37.37	+6.65		
Registered voters	10,137				
Sources
Footnotes: ^{1} Canarian Nationalist Party results are compared to Canarian Nationalist Federation totals in the 2003 election.

=== 2003 ===
Summary of the 25 May 2003 Parliament of the Canary Islands election results in El Hierro
Parties and alliances	Popular vote			Seats	
Parties and alliances	Votes	%	±pp	Total	+/−
Canarian Coalition–Independent Herrenian Group (CC–AHI)^{1}	2,727	44.96	–6.33	2	±0
People's Party (PP)	1,507	24.84	+2.04	1	+1
Spanish Socialist Workers' Party (PSOE)	1,308	21.56	–1.54	0	–1
Canarian Nationalist Federation (FNC)	430	7.09	New	0	±0
Blank ballots	94	1.55	+0.22		
Total	6,066			3	±0
Valid votes	6,066	99.10	–0.40		
Invalid votes	55	0.90	+0.40		
Votes cast / turnout	6,121	69.28	+4.87		
Abstentions	2,714	30.72	–4.87		
Registered voters	8,835				
Sources
Footnotes: ^{1} Canarian Coalition–Independent Herrenian Group results are compared to Independent Herrenian Group totals in the 1999 election.

=== 1999 ===
Summary of the 13 June 1999 Parliament of the Canary Islands election results in El Hierro
Parties and alliances	Popular vote			Seats	
Parties and alliances	Votes	%	±pp	Total	+/−
Independent Herrenian Group (AHI)	2,773	51.29	+8.27	2	+1
Spanish Socialist Workers' Party (PSOE)	1,249	23.10	+0.07	1	±0
People's Party (PP)	1,233	22.80	–3.89	0	–1
Canarian United Left (IUC)	66	1.22	+0.18	0	±0
Centrist Union–Democratic and Social Centre (UC–CDS)	14	0.26	–0.07	0	±0
Blank ballots	72	1.33	+0.51		
Total	5,407			3	±0
Valid votes	5,407	99.50	–0.26		
Invalid votes	27	0.50	+0.26		
Votes cast / turnout	5,434	64.41	–10.21		
Abstentions	3,002	35.59	+10.21		
Registered voters	8,436				

=== 1995 ===
Summary of the 28 May 1995 Parliament of the Canary Islands election results in El Hierro
Parties and alliances	Popular vote			Seats	
Parties and alliances	Votes	%	±pp	Total	+/−
Independent Herrenian Group (AHI)	2,105	43.02	+8.12	1	±0
People's Party (PP)	1,306	26.69	+2.15	1	±0
Spanish Socialist Workers' Party (PSOE)	1,127	23.03	–7.73	1	±0
Canarian Initiative (ICAN)	248	5.07	–4.31	0	±0
Canarian United Left (IUC)	51	1.04	New	0	±0
Democratic and Social Centre–Centrist Union (CDS–UC)	16	0.33	New	0	±0
Blank ballots	40	0.82	+0.51		
Total	4,893			3	±0
Valid votes	4,893	99.76	+0.13		
Invalid votes	12	0.24	–0.13		
Votes cast / turnout	4,905	74.62	–0.28		
Abstentions	1,668	25.38	+0.28		
Registered voters	6,573				

=== 1991 ===
Summary of the 26 May 1991 Parliament of the Canary Islands election results in El Hierro
Parties and alliances	Popular vote			Seats	
Parties and alliances	Votes	%	±pp	Total	+/−
Independent Herrenian Group (AHI)	1,485	34.90	–0.60	1	–1
Spanish Socialist Workers' Party (PSOE)	1,309	30.76	+6.88	1	±0
People's Party (PP)^{1}	1,044	24.54	+7.81	1	+1
Canarian Initiative (ICAN)^{2}	399	9.38	–3.89	0	±0
Workers' Socialist Party (PST)	5	0.12	+0.04	0	±0
Blank ballots	13	0.31	+0.16		
Total	4,255			3	±0
Valid votes	4,255	99.63	–0.22		
Invalid votes	16	0.37	+0.22		
Votes cast / turnout	4,271	74.90	–1.91		
Abstentions	1,431	25.10	+1.91		
Registered voters	5,702				
Sources
Footnotes: ^{1} People's Party results are compared to People's Alliance totals in the 1987 election.; ^{2} Canarian Initiative results are compared to United Canarian Left totals in the 1987 election.

=== 1987 ===
Summary of the 10 June 1987 Parliament of the Canary Islands election results in El Hierro
Parties and alliances	Popular vote			Seats	
Parties and alliances	Votes	%	±pp	Total	+/−
Independent Herrenian Group (AHI)	1,415	35.50	+7.88	2	+1
Spanish Socialist Workers' Party (PSOE)	952	23.88	–4.62	1	±0
People's Alliance (AP)^{1}	667	16.73	–13.17	0	–1
United Canarian Left (ICU)^{2}	529	13.27	–0.71	0	±0
Democratic and Social Centre (CDS)	414	10.39	New	0	±0
Workers' Socialist Party (PST)	3	0.08	New	0	±0
Blank ballots	6	0.15	+0.15		
Total	3,986			3	±0
Valid votes	3,986	99.85	+0.86		
Invalid votes	6	0.15	–0.86		
Votes cast / turnout	3,992	76.81	+7.00		
Abstentions	1,205	23.19	–7.00		
Registered voters	5,197				
Sources
Footnotes: ^{1} People's Alliance results are compared to People's Coalition totals in the 1983 election.; ^{2} United Canarian Left results are compared to Communist Party of the Canaries totals in the 1983 election.

=== 1983 ===
Summary of the 8 May 1983 Parliament of the Canary Islands election results in El Hierro
Parties and alliances	Popular vote			Seats	
Parties and alliances	Votes	%	±pp	Total	+/−
People's Coalition (AP–PDP–UL)	1,022	29.90	n/a	1	n/a
Spanish Socialist Workers' Party (PSOE)	974	28.50	n/a	1	n/a
Independent Herrenian Group (AHI)	944	27.62	n/a	1	n/a
Communist Party of the Canaries (PCC–PCE)	478	13.98	n/a	0	n/a
Blank ballots	0	0.00	n/a		
Total	3,418			3	n/a
Valid votes	3,418	98.99	n/a		
Invalid votes	35	1.01	n/a		
Votes cast / turnout	3,453	69.81	n/a		
Abstentions	1,493	30.19	n/a		
Registered voters	4,946				

== Bibliography ==
- Government of the Canary Islands (November 1987). Resultados procesos electorales en Canarias. Elecciones Locales: Ayuntamientos y Cabildos (1979-1983-1987). Elecciones Autonómicas: Parlamento de Canarias (1983-1987) (PDF) (in Spanish). Las Palmas de Gran Canaria: Statistics and Documentation Center of the Canary Islands. pp. 203–270. Archived from the original (PDF) on 17 April 2017.
