= La Palma (Parliament of the Canary Islands constituency) =

Coordinates: 28°40′N 17°52′W

- Parliament of the Canary Islands; Electoral constituency
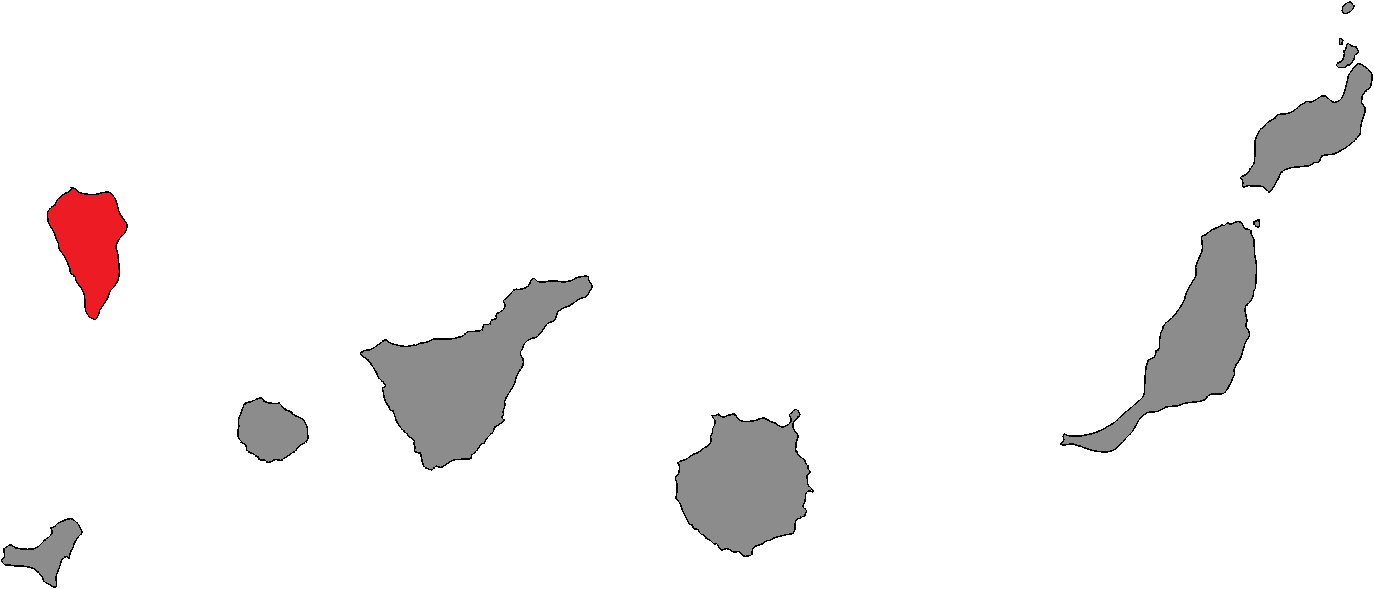
- Location of La Palma within the Canary Islands
- Island: La Palma
- Autonomous community: Canary Islands
- Population: ▲85,104 (2024)
- Electorate: ▲87,062 (2023)
- Major settlements: Los Llanos de Aridane

Current constituency
- Created: 1983
- Seats: 8
- Members: CCa (4); PSOE (2); PP (2)

La Palma is one of the seven constituencies (Spanish: circunscripciones) represented in the Parliament of the Canary Islands, the regional legislature of the Autonomous Community of the Canary Islands. The constituency currently elects 8 deputies. Its boundaries correspond to those of the island of La Palma. The electoral system uses the D'Hondt method and closed-list proportional representation, with a minimum threshold of fifteen percent in the constituency or four percent regionally.

== Electoral system ==
The constituency was created as per the Statute of Autonomy of the Canary Islands of 1982 and was first contested in the 1983 regional election. The Statute provides for the seven main islands in the Canarian archipelago—El Hierro, Fuerteventura, Gran Canaria, La Gomera, La Palma, Lanzarote and Tenerife—to be established as multi-member districts in the Parliament of the Canary Islands. Each constituency is allocated a fixed number of seats: 3 for El Hierro, 8 for Fuerteventura—7 until 2018—15 for Gran Canaria, 4 for La Gomera, 8 for La Palma, 8 for Lanzarote and 15 for Tenerife.

Voting is on the basis of universal suffrage, which comprises all nationals over eighteen, registered in the Canary Islands and in full enjoyment of their political rights. Amendments to the electoral law in 2011 required for Canarian citizens abroad to apply for voting before being permitted to vote, a system known as "begged" or expat vote (Spanish: Voto rogado) which was abolished in 2022. Seats are elected using the D'Hondt method and a closed list proportional representation, with an electoral threshold of 15 percent of valid votes—which includes blank ballots; until a 1997 reform, the threshold was set at 20 percent; between 1997 and 2018, it was set at 30 percent—being applied in each constituency. Alternatively, parties can also enter the seat distribution as long as they reach four percent regionally—three percent until 1997, six percent between 1997 and 2018.

The electoral law allows for parties and federations registered in the interior ministry, coalitions and groupings of electors to present lists of candidates. Parties and federations intending to form a coalition ahead of an election are required to inform the relevant Electoral Commission within ten days of the election call—fifteen before 1985—whereas groupings of electors need to secure the signature of at least one percent of the electorate in the constituencies for which they seek election—one-thousandth of the electorate, with a compulsory minimum of 500 signatures, until 1985—disallowing electors from signing for more than one list of candidates.

== Deputies ==
Deputies 1983–present
Key to parties PCC ICU ICAN PSOE CDS CCa AIC–API PP CP AP
Cortes	Election	Distribution
1st	1983	1 / 3 / 1 / 3
2nd	1987	1 / 2 / 1 / 2 / 2
3rd	1991	1 / 3 / 3 / 1
4th	1995	2 / 4 / 2
5th	1999	2 / 4 / 2
6th	2003	2 / 4 / 2
7th	2007	3 / 4 / 1
8th	2011	2 / 4 / 2
9th	2015	2 / 3 / 3
10th	2019	3 / 3 / 2
11th	2023	2 / 4 / 2

== Regional elections ==
=== 2023 ===
Summary of the 28 May 2023 Parliament of the Canary Islands election results in La Palma
Parties and alliances	Popular vote			Seats	
Parties and alliances	Votes	%	±pp	Total	+/−
Canarian Coalition (CCa)^{1}	18,756	42.42	+11.47	4	+1
Spanish Socialist Workers' Party (PSOE)	10,551	23.87	–3.30	2	–1
People's Party (PP)	8,827	19.97	–5.07	2	±0
Vox (Vox)	1,340	3.03	+1.24	0	±0
New Canaries–Canarian Bloc (NC–BC)	1,327	3.00	–0.71	0	±0
Drago Greens Canaries (DVC)	1,036	2.34	New	0	±0
United Yes We Can (Podemos–IUC–SSP)^{2}	874	1.98	–4.36	0	±0
Electoral Alternative Movement (MAE)	778	1.76	New	0	±0
More Canaries (+C)	130	0.29	New	0	±0
Blank ballots	592	1.34	+0.17		
Total	44,211			8	±0
Valid votes	44,211	98.03	–0.41		
Invalid votes	888	1.97	+0.41		
Votes cast / turnout	45,099	51.80	+0.78		
Abstentions	41,963	48.20	–0.78		
Registered voters	87,062				
Sources
Footnotes: ^{1} Canarian Coalition results are compared to Canarian Coalition–Canarian Nationalist Party totals in the 2019 election.; ^{2} United We Can results are compared to the combined totals of Yes We Can Canaries and Canarian United Left in the 2019 election.

=== 2019 ===
Summary of the 26 May 2019 Parliament of the Canary Islands election results in La Palma
Parties and alliances	Popular vote			Seats	
Parties and alliances	Votes	%	±pp	Total	+/−
Canarian Coalition–Canarian Nationalist Party (CCa–PNC)	13,248	30.95	+0.69	3	±0
Spanish Socialist Workers' Party (PSOE)	11,633	27.17	+2.61	3	+1
People's Party (PP)	10,720	25.04	+0.30	2	–1
Yes We Can Canaries (Podemos–SSP–Equo)^{1}	1,803	4.21	–2.32	0	±0
New Canaries (NCa)	1,588	3.71	+0.88	0	±0
Citizens–Party of the Citizenry (Cs)	1,377	3.22	–1.16	0	±0
Canarian United Left (IUC)^{2}	912	2.13	–0.46	0	±0
Vox (Vox)	766	1.79	New	0	±0
Canaries for Progress (Ci–Progreso)	263	0.61	New	0	±0
Blank ballots	500	1.17	–0.63		
Total	42,810			8	±0
Valid votes	42,810	98.44	+1.21		
Invalid votes	680	1.56	–1.21		
Votes cast / turnout	43,490	51.02	+0.74		
Abstentions	41,751	48.98	–0.74		
Registered voters	85,241				
Sources
Footnotes: ^{1} Yes We Can Canaries results are compared to We Can totals in the 2015 election.; ^{2} Canarian United Left results are compared to Canaries Decides totals in the 2015 election.

=== 2015 ===
Summary of the 24 May 2015 Parliament of the Canary Islands election results in La Palma
Parties and alliances	Popular vote			Seats	
Parties and alliances	Votes	%	±pp	Total	+/−
Canarian Coalition–Canarian Nationalist Party (CCa–PNC)	12,632	30.26	–9.27	3	–1
People's Party (PP)	10,327	24.74	–3.35	3	+1
Spanish Socialist Workers' Party (PSOE)	10,253	24.56	–0.30	2	±0
We Can (Podemos)	2,725	6.53	New	0	±0
Citizens–Party of the Citizenry (C's)	1,830	4.38	New	0	±0
New Canaries (NCa)	1,180	2.83	+1.05	0	±0
Canaries Decides (IUC–LV–UP–ALTER)^{1}	1,080	2.59	–0.50	0	±0
Union, Progress and Democracy (UPyD)	440	1.05	+0.34	0	±0
Animalist Party Against Mistreatment of Animals (PACMA)	366	0.88	+0.54	0	±0
Zero Cuts (Recortes Cero)	94	0.23	New	0	±0
Movement for the Unity of the Canarian People (MUPC)	60	0.14	–0.01	0	±0
Blank ballots	753	1.80	+0.34		
Total	41,740			8	±0
Valid votes	41,740	97.23	–0.87		
Invalid votes	1,190	2.77	+0.87		
Votes cast / turnout	42,930	50.28	–6.68		
Abstentions	42,446	49.72	+6.68		
Registered voters	85,376				
Sources
Footnotes: ^{1} Canaries Decides results are compared to the combined totals of The Greens, Canarian United Left and Unity of the People in the 2011 election.

=== 2011 ===
Summary of the 22 May 2011 Parliament of the Canary Islands election results in La Palma
Parties and alliances	Popular vote			Seats	
Parties and alliances	Votes	%	±pp	Total	+/−
Canarian Coalition–Nationalist Party–Canarian Centre (CC–PNC–CCN)^{1}	17,700	39.53	–10.68	4	±0
People's Party (PP)	12,577	28.09	+11.08	2	+1
Spanish Socialist Workers' Party (PSOE)	11,133	24.86	–3.33	2	–1
New Canaries (NCa)	795	1.78	–0.05	0	±0
The Greens (Verdes)	678	1.51	+0.86	0	±0
Canarian United Left (IUC)	631	1.41	+0.87	0	±0
Union, Progress and Democracy (UPyD)	318	0.71	New	0	±0
Anti-Bullfighting Party Against Mistreatment of Animals (PACMA)	153	0.34	New	0	±0
Unity of the People (UP)	77	0.17	New	0	±0
Movement for the Unity of the Canarian People (MUPC)	66	0.15	–0.35	0	±0
Blank ballots	652	1.46	+0.68		
Total	44,780			8	±0
Valid votes	44,780	98.10	–1.46		
Invalid votes	869	1.90	+1.46		
Votes cast / turnout	45,649	56.96	–5.52		
Abstentions	34,487	43.04	+5.52		
Registered voters	80,136				
Sources
Footnotes: ^{1} Canarian Coalition–Nationalist Party–Canarian Centre results are compared to the combined totals of Canarian Coalition–Canarian Nationalist Party and Canarian Centre in the 2007 election.

=== 2007 ===
Summary of the 27 May 2007 Parliament of the Canary Islands election results in La Palma
Parties and alliances	Popular vote			Seats	
Parties and alliances	Votes	%	±pp	Total	+/−
Canarian Coalition–Canarian Nationalist Party (CC–PNC)	23,002	46.16	–4.57	4	±0
Spanish Socialist Workers' Party (PSOE)	14,046	28.19	+5.12	3	+1
People's Party (PP)	8,479	17.01	–6.42	1	–1
Canarian Centre (CCN)	2,017	4.05	New	0	±0
Initiative for La Palma–New Canaries (NCa)	910	1.83	New	0	±0
The Greens (Verdes)	325	0.65	New	0	±0
Canarian United Left (IUC)	269	0.54	–0.55	0	±0
Movement for the Unity of the Canarian People (MUPC)	248	0.50	New	0	±0
Canarian Popular Alternative–25 May Citizens' Alternative (APCa–AC25M)^{1}	149	0.30	–0.39	0	±0
Blank ballots	388	0.78	–0.22		
Total	49,833			8	±0
Valid votes	49,833	99.56	+0.10		
Invalid votes	218	0.44	–0.10		
Votes cast / turnout	50,051	62.48	–1.06		
Abstentions	30,060	37.52	+1.06		
Registered voters	80,111				
Sources
Footnotes: ^{1} Canarian Popular Alternative–25 May Citizens' Alternative results are compared to Canarian Popular Alternative totals in the 2003 election.

=== 2003 ===
Summary of the 25 May 2003 Parliament of the Canary Islands election results in La Palma
Parties and alliances	Popular vote			Seats	
Parties and alliances	Votes	%	±pp	Total	+/−
Canarian Coalition (CC)	24,022	50.73	+3.45	4	±0
People's Party (PP)	11,094	23.43	+2.14	2	±0
Spanish Socialist Workers' Party (PSOE)	10,923	23.07	–3.96	2	±0
Canarian United Left (IUC)	518	1.09	–1.05	0	±0
Canarian Popular Alternative (APCa)	326	0.69	New	0	±0
Blank ballots	472	1.00	+0.23		
Total	47,355			8	±0
Valid votes	47,355	99.46	–0.14		
Invalid votes	255	0.54	+0.14		
Votes cast / turnout	47,610	63.54	+0.09		
Abstentions	27,314	36.46	–0.09		
Registered voters	74,924				

=== 1999 ===
Summary of the 13 June 1999 Parliament of the Canary Islands election results in La Palma
Parties and alliances	Popular vote			Seats	
Parties and alliances	Votes	%	±pp	Total	+/−
Canarian Coalition (CC)	21,106	47.28	+1.68	4	±0
Spanish Socialist Workers' Party (PSOE)	12,068	27.03	–0.37	2	±0
People's Party (PP)	9,502	21.29	+1.25	2	±0
Canarian United Left (IUC)	954	2.14	–2.72	0	±0
The Greens of the Canaries (Verdes)	668	1.50	New	0	±0
Blank ballots	342	0.77	–0.11		
Total	44,640			8	±0
Valid votes	44,640	99.60	–0.01		
Invalid votes	181	0.40	+0.01		
Votes cast / turnout	44,821	63.45	–2.01		
Abstentions	25,815	36.55	+2.01		
Registered voters	70,636				

=== 1995 ===
Summary of the 28 May 1995 Parliament of the Canary Islands election results in La Palma
Parties and alliances	Popular vote			Seats	
Parties and alliances	Votes	%	±pp	Total	+/−
Canarian Coalition (CC)^{1}	19,120	45.60	+5.94	4	±0
Spanish Socialist Workers' Party (PSOE)	11,489	27.40	–6.42	2	–1
People's Party (PP)	8,401	20.04	+1.54	2	+1
Canarian United Left (IUC)	2,037	4.86	New	0	±0
Democratic and Social Centre–Centrist Union (CDS–UC)	512	1.22	–6.22	0	±0
Blank ballots	369	0.88	+0.50		
Total	41,928			8	±0
Valid votes	41,928	99.61	+0.18		
Invalid votes	164	0.39	–0.18		
Votes cast / turnout	42,092	65.46	–1.91		
Abstentions	22,212	34.54	+1.91		
Registered voters	64,304				
Sources
Footnotes: ^{1} Canarian Coalition results are compared to the combined totals of Canarian Independent Groups–La Palma Group of Independents and Canarian Initiative in the 1991 election.

=== 1991 ===
Summary of the 26 May 1991 Parliament of the Canary Islands election results in La Palma
Parties and alliances	Popular vote			Seats	
Parties and alliances	Votes	%	±pp	Total	+/−
Spanish Socialist Workers' Party (PSOE)	13,809	33.82	+7.64	3	+1
Canarian Independent Groups–La Palma Group of Independents (AIC–API)	11,906	29.16	+3.56	3	+1
People's Party (PP)^{1}	7,553	18.50	–1.52	1	–1
Canarian Initiative (ICAN)^{2}	4,286	10.50	–0.58	1	±0
Democratic and Social Centre (CDS)	3,039	7.44	–9.23	0	–1
Workers' Socialist Party (PST)	84	0.21	New	0	±0
Blank ballots	154	0.38	–0.07		
Total	40,831			8	±0
Valid votes	40,831	99.43	–0.12		
Invalid votes	235	0.57	+0.12		
Votes cast / turnout	41,066	67.27	+0.40		
Abstentions	19,977	32.73	–0.40		
Registered voters	61,043				
Sources
Footnotes: ^{1} People's Party results are compared to People's Alliance totals in the 1987 election.; ^{2} Canarian Initiative results are compared to United Canarian Left totals in the 1987 election.

=== 1987 ===
Summary of the 10 June 1987 Parliament of the Canary Islands election results in La Palma
Parties and alliances	Popular vote			Seats	
Parties and alliances	Votes	%	±pp	Total	+/−
Spanish Socialist Workers' Party (PSOE)	9,994	26.18	–5.83	2	–1
Canarian Independent Groups–La Palma Group of Independents (AIC–API)	9,771	25.60	New	2	+2
People's Alliance (AP)^{1}	7,640	20.02	–17.35	2	–1
Democratic and Social Centre (CDS)	6,364	16.67	+0.83	1	±0
United Canarian Left (ICU)^{2}	4,230	11.08	–3.69	1	±0
Blank ballots	171	0.45	+0.45		
Total	38,170			8	±0
Valid votes	38,170	99.55	+1.01		
Invalid votes	172	0.45	–1.01		
Votes cast / turnout	38,342	66.87	+4.13		
Abstentions	18,998	33.13	–4.13		
Registered voters	57,340				
Sources
Footnotes: ^{1} People's Alliance results are compared to People's Coalition totals in the 1983 election.; ^{2} United Canarian Left results are compared to Communist Party of the Canaries totals in the 1983 election.

=== 1983 ===
Summary of the 8 May 1983 Parliament of the Canary Islands election results in La Palma
Parties and alliances	Popular vote			Seats	
Parties and alliances	Votes	%	±pp	Total	+/−
People's Coalition (AP–PDP–UL)	13,069	37.37	n/a	3	n/a
Spanish Socialist Workers' Party (PSOE)	11,193	32.01	n/a	3	n/a
Democratic and Social Centre (CDS)	5,540	15.84	n/a	1	n/a
Communist Party of the Canaries (PCC–PCE)	5,166	14.77	n/a	1	n/a
Blank ballots	0	0.00	n/a		
Total	34,968			8	n/a
Valid votes	34,968	98.54	n/a		
Invalid votes	517	1.46	n/a		
Votes cast / turnout	35,485	62.74	n/a		
Abstentions	21,074	37.26	n/a		
Registered voters	56,559				

== Bibliography ==
- Government of the Canary Islands (November 1987). Resultados procesos electorales en Canarias. Elecciones Locales: Ayuntamientos y Cabildos (1979-1983-1987). Elecciones Autonómicas: Parlamento de Canarias (1983-1987) (PDF) (in Spanish). Las Palmas de Gran Canaria: Statistics and Documentation Center of the Canary Islands. pp. 203–270. Archived from the original on 2017-04-17.
