= 1991 Canarian regional election =

Election in the Spanish region of the Canary Islands

- 26 May 1991

All 60 seats in the Parliament of the Canary Islands 31 seats needed for a majority
- Opinion polls
- Registered: 1,135,550 ▲13.2%
- Turnout: 700,541 (61.7%) ▼5.8 pp
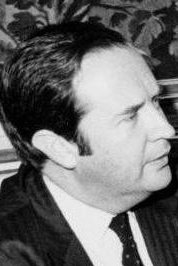

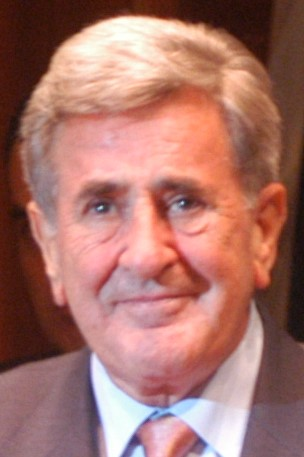

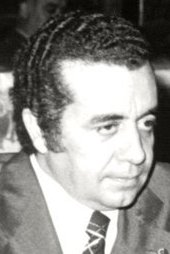

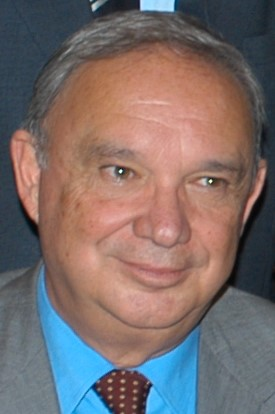

	First party	Second party	Third party
Leader	Jerónimo Saavedra	Manuel Hermoso	Lorenzo Olarte
Party	PSOE	AIC	CDS
Leader since	1977	1991	1983
Leader's seat	Gran Canaria	Tenerife	Gran Canaria
Last election	21 seats, 27.8%	11 seats, 20.1%	13 seats, 19.5%
Seats won	23	16	7
Seat change	▲2	▲5	▼6
Popular vote	229,692	157,859	100,197
Percentage	33.0%	22.7%	14.4%
Swing	▲5.2 pp	▲2.6 pp	▼5.1 pp
	Fourth party	Fifth party	Sixth party
Leader	Fernando Fernández Martín	Antonio Fernández Viéitez	Miguel Cabrera Cabrera
Party	PP	ICAN	AM
Leader since	1991	1991	1983
Leader's seat	Tenerife	Gran Canaria	Fuerteventura
Last election	6 seats, 13.2% (Note: Results for AP (11.2%, 6 seats) and PDP–CC (2.0%, 0 seats) in the 1987 election.)	4 seats, 13.2% (Note: Results for AC–INC (6.9%, 2 seats), ICU (6.1%, 2 seats) and UNI (0.2%, 0 seats) in the 1987 election.)	3 seats, 0.8%
Seats won	6	5	2
Seat change	0	▲1	▼1
Popular vote	89,251	85,015	4,906
Percentage	12.8%	12.2%	0.7%
Swing	▼0.4 pp	▼1.0 pp	▼0.1 pp
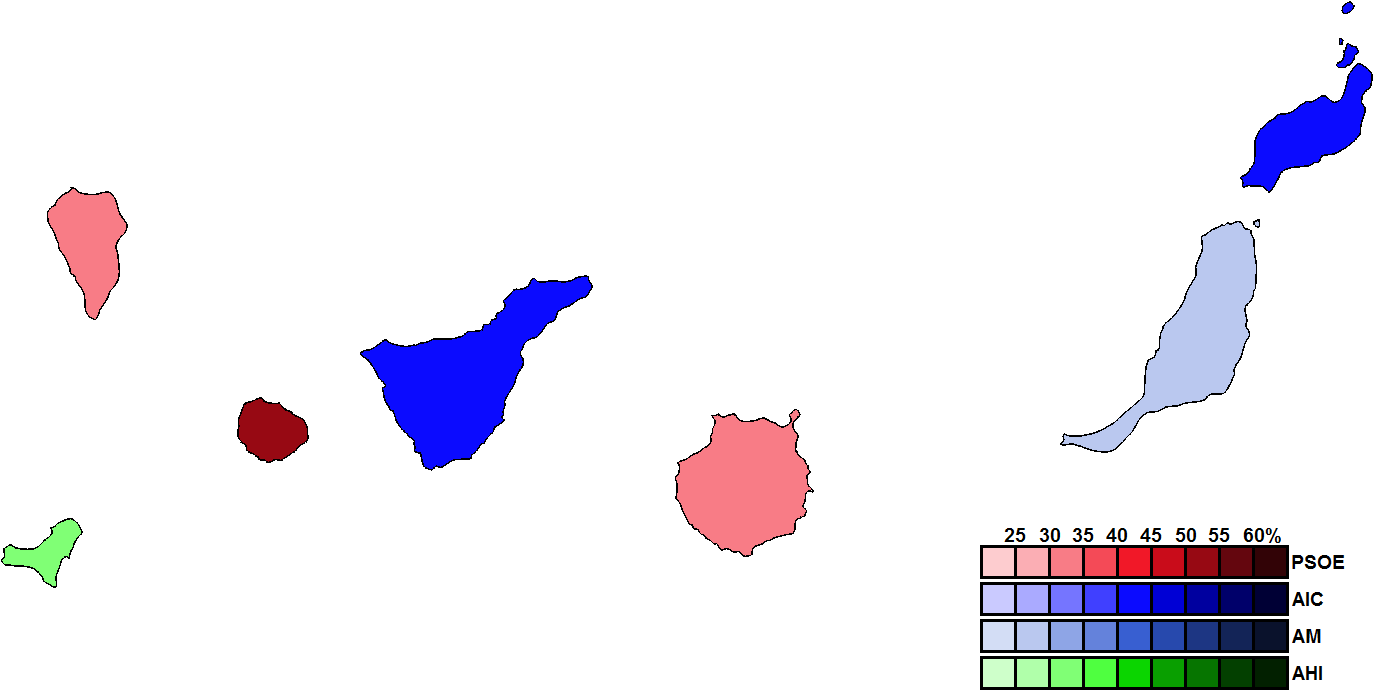
- Constituency results map for the Parliament of the Canary Islands
President before election
Lorenzo Olarte
CDS
President after election
Jerónimo Saavedra
PSOE

A regional election was held in the Canary Islands on 26 May 1991 to elect the 3rd Parliament of the autonomous community. All 60 seats in the Parliament were up for election. It was held concurrently with regional elections in twelve other autonomous communities and local elections all across Spain.

== Overview ==
Under the 1982 Statute of Autonomy, the Parliament of the Canary Islands was the unicameral legislature of the homonymous autonomous community, having legislative power in devolved matters, as well as the ability to grant or withdraw confidence from a regional president. The electoral and procedural rules were supplemented by national law provisions.

=== Date ===
The term of the Parliament of the Canary Islands expired four years after the date of its previous ordinary election, with amendments earlier in 1991 fixing election day for the fourth Sunday of May every four years. The election decree was required to be issued between 54 and 60 days before the scheduled election date and published on the following day in the Official Gazette of the Canaries (BOC). The previous election was held on 10 June 1987, setting the date for election day on the fourth Sunday of May four years later, which was 26 May 1991.

The Parliament of the Canary Islands could not be dissolved before the expiration date of parliament, except in the event of an investiture process failing to elect a regional president within a two-month period from the first ballot. In such a case, the Parliament was to be automatically dissolved and a snap election called, with elected lawmakers serving the remainder of its original four-year term.

The election to the Parliament of the Canary Islands was officially called on 2 April 1991 with the publication of the corresponding decree in the BOC, setting election day for 26 May.

=== Electoral system ===
Voting for the Parliament was based on universal suffrage, comprising all Spanish nationals over 18 years of age, registered in the Canary Islands and with full political rights, provided that they had not been deprived of the right to vote by a final sentence, nor were legally incapacitated.

The Parliament of the Canary Islands had a minimum of 50 and a maximum of 70 seats, with electoral provisions fixing its size at 60. All were elected in seven multi-member constituencies—corresponding to the islands of El Hierro, Fuerteventura, Gran Canaria, La Gomera, La Palma, Lanzarote and Tenerife, each of which was assigned a fixed number of seats—using the D'Hondt method and closed-list proportional voting, with a 20 percent-threshold of valid votes (including blank ballots) in each constituency or three percent regionally.

As a result of the aforementioned allocation, each Parliament constituency was entitled the following seats:

Seats	Constituencies
15	Gran Canaria, Tenerife
8	La Palma, Lanzarote
7	Fuerteventura
4	La Gomera
3	El Hierro

The law did not provide for by-elections to fill vacant seats; instead, any vacancies arising after the proclamation of candidates and during the legislative term were filled by the next candidates on the party lists or, when required, by designated substitutes.

== Opinion polls ==
The tables below list opinion polling results in reverse chronological order, showing the most recent first and using the dates when the survey fieldwork was done, as opposed to the date of publication. Where the fieldwork dates are unknown, the date of publication is given instead. The highest percentage figure in each polling survey is displayed with its background shaded in the leading party's colour. If a tie ensues, this is applied to the figures with the highest percentages. The "Lead" column on the right shows the percentage-point difference between the parties with the highest percentages in a poll.

=== Voting intention estimates ===
The table below lists weighted voting intention estimates. Refusals are generally excluded from the party vote percentages, while question wording and the treatment of "don't know" responses and those not intending to vote may vary between polling organisations. When available, seat projections determined by the polling organisations are displayed below (or in place of) the percentages in a smaller font; 31 seats were required for an absolute majority in the Parliament of the Canary Islands.

Polling firm/Commissioner	Fieldwork date	Sample size	Turnout	PSOE	AIC	CDS	AP	AC	ICU	PDP	AM	AHI	PP	ICAN	Lead
1991 regional election	26 May 1991	—N/a	61.7	33.0; 23	22.7; 16	14.4; 7	(Note: Within PP.)	(Note: Within ICAN.)			0.7; 2	0.2; 1	12.8; 6	12.2; 5	10.3
Sigma Dos/El Mundo	18 May 1991	?	?	27.7; 19/20	20.8; 12/13	16.3; 10/11					–	0.2; 2	14.0; 7/8	13.7; 8/9	6.9
Metra Seis/El Independiente	12 May 1991	?	?	32.0; 19/20	21.7; 15/17	14.8; 10/11					–	–	14.7; 7/8	13.5; 6/8	10.3
Demoscopia/El País	4–7 May 1991	600	?	31.4; 24	21.6; 12	15.2; 7/8					0.4; 2	0.1; 2	20.2; 8/10	11.1; 4	9.8
1989 general election	29 Oct 1989	—N/a	62.1	36.1	9.7	17.6		3.2	8.0		–	–	19.4	–	16.7
1989 EP election	15 Jun 1989	—N/a	49.5	34.9	11.1	16.2		3.2	5.3		–	–	16.6	–	18.3
1987 regional election	10 Jun 1987	—N/a	67.4	27.8; 21	20.1; 11	19.5; 13	11.2; 6	6.9; 2	6.1; 2	2.0; 0	0.8; 3	0.2; 2	–	–	7.7

== Results ==
=== Overall ===
← Summary of the 26 May 1991 Parliament of the Canary Islands election results →
Parties and alliances	Popular vote			Seats	
Parties and alliances	Votes	%	±pp	Total	+/−
Spanish Socialist Workers' Party (PSOE)	229,692	33.03	+5.26	23	+2
Canarian Independent Groups (AIC)	157,859	22.70	+2.57	16	+5
Democratic and Social Centre (CDS)	100,197	14.41	−5.07	7	−6
People's Party (PP)^{1}	89,251	12.83	−0.33	6	±0
Canarian Initiative (ICAN)^{2}	85,015	12.22	−0.98	5	+1
Canarian Nationalist Party (PNC)	7,845	1.13	New	0	±0
Majorera Assembly (AM)	4,906	0.71	−0.10	2	−1
Canarian Coalition for Independence (CI (FREPIC–Awañac))	4,090	0.59	+0.43	0	±0
Workers' Socialist Party (PST)	2,298	0.33	+0.02	0	±0
The Greens (LV)	2,198	0.32	New	0	±0
Independent Herrenian Group (AHI)	1,485	0.21	±0.00	1	−1
Party of The People (LG)	1,484	0.21	New	0	±0
Left Platform (PCE (m–l)–CRPE)	1,093	0.16	New	0	±0
The Greens Ecologist–Humanist List (LVLE–H)^{3}	1,092	0.16	−0.01	0	±0
Insular Group of Gran Canaria (AIGRANC)	962	0.14	New	0	±0
Assembly (Tagoror)	671	0.10	+0.01	0	±0
Blank ballots	5,323	0.77	+0.12		
Total	695,461			60	±0
Valid votes	695,461	99.27	+0.43		
Invalid votes	5,080	0.73	−0.43		
Votes cast / turnout	700,541	61.69	−5.80		
Abstentions	435,009	38.31	+5.80		
Registered voters	1,135,550				
Sources
Footnotes: ^{1} People's Party results are compared to the combined totals of People's Alliance and People's Democratic Party–Canarian Centrists in the 1987 election.; ^{2} Canarian Initiative results are compared to the combined totals of Canarian Assembly–Canarian Nationalist Left, United Canarian Left and Union of Left Nationalists in the 1987 election.; ^{3} The Greens Ecologist–Humanist List results are compared to Humanist Platform totals in the 1987 election.

Popular vote
PSOE	33.03%
AIC	22.70%
CDS	14.41%
PP	12.83%
ICAN	12.22%
PNC	1.13%
AM	0.71%
AHI	0.21%
Others	2.00%
Blank ballots	0.77%

Seats
PSOE	38.33%
AIC	26.67%
CDS	11.67%
PP	10.00%
ICAN	8.33%
AM	3.33%
AHI	1.67%

=== Distribution by constituency ===
Constituency	PSOE		AIC		CDS		PP		ICAN		AM		AHI	
Constituency	%	S	%	S	%	S	%	S	%	S	%	S	%	S
El Hierro	30.8	1					24.5	1	9.4	−			34.9	1
Fuerteventura	25.1	2	23.2	2	17.8	1	5.5	−			27.6	2		
Gran Canaria	32.2	5	4.6	−	23.8	4	16.6	3	17.8	3				
La Gomera	54.9	3			33.7	1	3.7	−	6.9	−				
La Palma	33.8	3	29.2	3	7.4	−	18.5	1	10.5	1				
Lanzarote	32.3	3	44.5	4	10.6	1	4.4	−	3.8	−				
Tenerife	33.7	6	40.8	7	4.6	−	9.3	1	8.2	1				
Total	33.0	23	22.7	16	14.4	7	12.8	6	12.2	5	0.7	2	0.2	1

== Aftermath ==
=== Government formation ===
Investiture; Nomination of Jerónimo Saavedra (PSOE)
Ballot →	10 July 1991
Required majority →	31 out of 60
Yes: • PSOE (23); • AIC (16); • AHI (1)	40 / 60
No: • CDS (6); • PP (6); • ICAN (5)	17 / 60
Abstentions: • AM (2)	2 / 60
Absentees: • CDS (1)	1 / 60

=== 1993 motion of no confidence ===
Motion of no confidence Nomination of Manuel Hermoso (AIC)
Ballot →	31 March 1993
Required majority →	31 out of 60
Yes: • AIC (16); • CDS (7); • ICAN (5); • AM (2); • AHI (1)	31 / 60
No: • PSOE (23)	23 / 60
Abstentions: • PP (6)	6 / 60
Absentees	0 / 60

== Bibliography ==
- Ley Orgánica 10/1982, de 10 de agosto, de Estatuto de Autonomía de Canarias (Organic Law 10/1982). Official State Gazette (in Spanish). 10 August 1982 [version as of 16 August 1982]. BOE-A-1982-20821.
- Ley Orgánica 5/1985, de 19 de junio, del Régimen Electoral General (Organic Law 5/1985). Official State Gazette (in Spanish). 19 June 1985 [version as of 14 March 1991]. BOE-A-1985-11672.
- Ley 3/1987, de 3 de abril, de medidas urgentes en materia electoral (Law 3/1987). Official State Gazette (in Spanish). 3 April 1987. BOE-A-1987-9084.
- Ley 2/1991, de 18 de marzo, de modificación de determinados artículos de la Ley Territorial 3/1987, de 3 de abril, de medidas urgentes en materia electoral (Law 2/1991). Official State Gazette (in Spanish). 18 March 1991. BOE-A-1991-8593.
- Decreto 64/1991, de 1 de abril, del Presidente de la Comunidad Autónoma de Canarias, por el que se convocan elecciones al Parlamento de Canarias (PDF) (Decree 64/1991). Official Gazette of the Canaries (in Spanish). 1 April 1991.
