= Independent Herrenian Group =

Independent Herrenian Group Agrupación Herreña Independiente
- Leader: Tomás Padrón; Belén Allende
- Founded: 1979
- Ideology: El Hierro regionalism Canarian nationalism Federalism
- Political position: Centre
- Regional affiliation: Canarian Coalition (2002–2012, 2015–2023)
- Colours: Green
- Congress of Deputies: 0 / 350
- Spanish Senate (El Hierro seat): 1 / 1
- European Parliament (Spanish seats): 0 / 61
- Cabildo of El Hierro: 4 / 13
- Canarian Parliament (El Hierro seats): 1 / 3
- Mayors in El Hierro: 1 / 3
- Town councillors: 11 / 31

Website
- ahi-elhierro.es

The Independent Herrenian Group (Spanish: Agrupación Herreña Independiente, AHI) is a regionalist and Canarian nationalist political party in El Hierro. AHI was created in 1979, and ruled the island until 2019, with the exception of the 1991–1995 and 2011–2015 periods.

The party is generally associated with Canarian Coalition.

== Electoral performance ==
=== Parliament of the Canary Islands ===
Date	Votes			Seats		Status	Size	Notes
Date	#	%	±pp	#	±	Status	Size	Notes
1983	944	0.2%	—	1 / 60	—	Opposition	9th	government support
1987	1,415	0.2%	±0.0	2 / 60	1	Opposition	8th	government support
1991	1,485	0.2%	±0.0	1 / 60	1	Opposition	7th	government support
1995	2,105	0.3%	+0.1	1 / 60	0	Opposition	5th	government support
1999	2,773	0.3%	±0.0	2 / 60	1	Opposition	4th	government support
2003	304,413	32.9%	n/a	2 / 60	0	Opposition	*	government support
2007	226,122	24.2%	–8.7	2 / 60	0	Opposition	*	government support
2011	225,948	24.9%	+0.7	1 / 60	1	Opposition	*	government support
2015	166,979	18.2%	−6.7	2 / 60	1	Opposition	*	government support

- * Within Canarian Coalition.

== See also ==
- Canarian nationalism
- El Hierro
