= Nationalist Canarian Platform =

Nationalist Canarian Platform Plataforma Canaria Nacionalista
- Founded: 1995
- Dissolved: 1999
- Succeeded by: Canarian Nationalist Federation
- Ideology: Canarian nationalism

Nationalist Canarian Platform (Spanish: Plataforma Canaria Nacionalista, PCN) was an electoral alliance in the Canary Islands, formed by the Party of Gran Canaria (PGC), Independents of Fuerteventura (IF) and Lanzarote Independents Party (PIL) ahead of the 1995 Canarian election.

== Member parties ==
- Party of Gran Canaria (PGC)
- Independents of Fuerteventura (IF)
- Lanzarote Independents Party (PIL)
