= Canarian Nationalist Federation =

Canarian Nationalist Federation Federación Nacionalista Canaria
- Founded: 1999
- Dissolved: 2007
- Preceded by: Nationalist Canarian Platform
- Ideology: Canarian nationalism

Canarian Nationalist Federation (Spanish: Federación Nacionalista Canaria, FNC) was an electoral alliance in the Canary Islands, formed by the Canarian Nationalist Party (PNC), Independents of Fuerteventura (IF) and Lanzarote Independents Party (PIL) ahead of the 1999 Canarian election.

== Member parties ==
- Canarian Nationalist Party (PNC)
- Independents of Fuerteventura (IF)
- Lanzarote Independents Party (PIL)
