= Lanzarote Independents Party =

Political party in Spain

Lanzarote Independents Party Partido de Independientes de Lanzarote
- Founded: 1985 (as AIL); 8 September 1989 (as PIL)
- Headquarters: C/ Doctor Juan Negrín, 158, 35500 Arrecife (Las Palmas)
- Ideology: Canarian nationalism
- Regional affiliation: Canarian Independent Groups (1993–1994)

Website
- www.elpil.es

The Lanzarote Independents Party (Spanish: Partido de Independientes de Lanzarote, PIL), formerly the Lanzarote Independents Group (Spanish: Agrupación Independientes de Lanzarote, AIL), is a political party in Lanzarote (Canary Islands).

== History ==
Created in 1985 as the Lanzarote Independents Group (AIL) within the Canarian Independent Groups, in 1989 it was constituted as the Lanzarote Independents Party (PIL), later participating in the formation of the Canarian Coalition. After a series of discontents with the political line of the Coalition, the PIL dissociated itself from it. In the elections to the 2003 Canarian regional election, it presented itself in coalition with other parties such as the Canarian Nationalist Party within the Canarian Nationalist Federation.

In recent years, several cases of corruption involving members of the PIL have been reported. The former president of the nationalist party, Dimas Martín, a former senator and president of the Cabildo of Lanzarote, has been convicted six times and imprisoned four times for various crimes of corruption between 1998 and 2004, including forgery, bribery and embezzlement.

The PIL has acceded, among others, to the mayor's office in the municipalities of Teguise (Dimas Martín, and José Dimas, son of the previous one) and Arrecife (Cándido Armas, after buying the vote of a councillor for 26 million pesetas), or the vice-presidency of the Cabildo of Lanzarote (Fabián Martín, son of the president of the PIL).

In the municipal and regional elections of June 2007, the PIL stood on a platform with the CCN, but was not represented in the Canarian Parliament, although it achieved a good representation in the Cabildo of Lanzarote, where it was the second political force after the PSOE. It is precisely this party that has maintained government pacts in the Cabildo, as well as in some main town halls of Lanzarote, including Arrecife. In the 2008 general elections, it ran with the Canary Islands Coalition, without achieving this electoral pact representation either in the Spanish Senate for the island of Lanzarote or in the Congress of Deputies, by district of the province of Las Palmas.
