= Canarian Independent Groups =

Canarian Independent Groups Agrupaciones Independientes de Canarias
- Founded: 1985
- Dissolved: 28 May 2005
- Merged into: Canarian Coalition
- Headquarters: C/ Galcerán, 7-9 Edif. El Drago, Santa Cruz de Tenerife
- Ideology: Regionalism; Canarian nationalism
- Political position: Centre-right
- Regional affiliation: Canarian Coalition (1985–2005)

The Canarian Independent Groups (Spanish: Agrupaciones Independientes de Canarias, AIC) were a Spanish political party based in the Canary Islands that existed from 1985 until its integration in Canarian Coalition.

== History ==
The party was founded in 1985 with the name of Federation of Canarian Independent Groups (Spanish: Federación de Agrupaciones Independientes de Canarias), consisting of the union of different parties and groupings of insular scope, coming mostly from the former Union of the Democratic Centre (UCD). On 23 April 1986 they changed their name to Canarian Independent Groups. In 1987 it was joined by the Canarian Union of the Centre. The members of AIC were mainly centre-right and insularist political groups.

In 1993, together with the Nationalist Canarian Initiative (ICAN), Majorera Assembly (AM), Canarian Nationalist Party (PNC) and Independent Canarian Centre (CCI) it formed Canarian Coalition (CC). However, in 1994, Independents of Fuerteventura (IF) and Lanzarote Independents Group (transformed into the Lanzarote Independents Party (PIL)) abandon both Canarian Independent Groups and Canarian Coalition.

It obtained parliamentary representation in the general elections of 1986 and in the ones of 1989. It was dissolved definitively during the Canarian Coalition Congress celebrated in 18–19 May 2005, in which all the integral parties disappeared and CC became unique party.

== Members ==
The groups that were members of the party are:

- Tenerife Group of Independents (Spanish: Agrupación Tinerfeña de Independientes, ATI)
- La Palma Group of Independents (Spanish: Agrupación Palmera de Independientes, API)
- Gomera Group of Independents (Spanish: Agrupación Gomera de Independientes, AGI)
- Independents of Fuerteventura (Spanish: Independientes de Fuerteventura, IF)
- Lanzarote Independents Group (Spanish: Agrupación de Independientes de Lanzarote, AIL), although this group ended up leaving the organization..

== Election results ==
=== Parliament of the Canary Islands ===
Parliament of the Canary Islands
Election	Vote	%	Score	Seats	+/–	Leader	Status
1987	134,667	20.1	2nd	11 / 60	11	Manuel Hermoso	Coalition
1991	157,859	22.7	2nd	16 / 60	5	Manuel Hermoso	Coalition

=== Cortes Generales ===
Cortes Generales
Election	Congress					Senate		Status
Election	Vote	%	Score	Seats	+/–	Seats	+/–	Status
1986	65,664	0.3	16th	1 / 350	1	1 / 208	1	Opposition
1989	64,767	0.3	19th	1 / 350	0	2 / 208	1	Opposition

Election	Canary Islands						
Election	Congress					Senate	
Election	Vote	%	Score	Seats	+/–	Seats	+/–
1986	65,664	9.8	4th	1 / 13	1	1 / 11	1
1989	64,767	9.7	4th	1 / 14	0	2 / 11	1

=== European Parliament ===
European Parliament
Election	Total					Canary Islands		
Election	Vote	%	Score	Seats	+/–	Vote	%	Score
1987	96,895	0.5	18th	0 / 60	—	89,083	14.5	4th
1989	w. Nationalist Coalition			0 / 60	0	57,932	11.1	4th
