= Nationalist Canarian Initiative =

Nationalist Canarian Initiative Iniciativa Canaria Nacionalista
- Leader: Collective leadership
- Founded: 1991
- Dissolved: 1993
- Merger of: Canarian United Left; Canarian Nationalist Assembly; Left Nationalists Union
- Merged into: Canarian Coalition
- Headquarters: Santa Cruz de Tenerife
- Ideology: Canarian nationalism Left-wing nationalism Social democracy Ecologism
- Political position: Centre-left to left-wing
- Colours: White, blue, yellow and green

Party flag

The Nationalist Canarian Initiative (Spanish: Iniciativa Canaria Nacionalista; ICAN), initially called Canarian Initiative (Spanish: Iniciativa Canaria), was a nationalist political party in the Canary Islands founded in 1991.

== History ==
ICAN was founded in 1991, being originally was linked to the Canarian United Left (IUC) until a few months after the municipal elections of 1991, when a conflict arose between these two organizations. The PSOE ruled the Cabildo of Gran Canaria, but ICAN filed a censure motion (with the support of CDS and the PP). Following the motion of censure ICAN was expelled of IUC.

In 1993 ICAN merged with the AIC (Canarian Independent Groups), AM (Majorera Assembly), PNC (Canarian Nationalist Party) and CCN (Nationalist Canarian Centre) to form Canarian Coalition.

== See also ==
- Canarian nationalism
- Canarian Coalition
- Canarian People's Union
