= Canarian United Left =

Canarian United Left Izquierda Unida Canaria
- General Coordinator: Ramón Trujillo
- Founded: 1986; 1993 (refoundation)
- Merger of: Communist Party of the Canaries; Izquierda Abierta; Inciativa por El Hierro; Independents; Party of Socialist Action-Canarian Socialist Current (1995-2001)
- Ideology: Socialism; Anticapitalism; Communism; Republicanism; Self-determination; Feminism
- Political position: Left-wing
- National affiliation: United Left
- Regional affiliation: Canarian People's Unity (since 2026)
- Canarian Parliament: 0 / 70
- Town councillors: 14 / 1,382

Website
- iu-canarias.org iutenerife.org

Canarian United Left (Spanish: Izquierda Unida Canaria, IUC) is the Canarian federation of the Spanish left wing political and social movement United Left. Ramón Trujillo is the current General Coordinator. The Communist Party of the Canaries (PCC-PCE, Canarian federation of PCE) is the major member of the coalition.

== Organization ==
ICU has assemblies in the islands of Lanzarote, La Palma, Fuerteventura, Gran Canaria, Tenerife and El Hierro. The organization had an electoral pact with Socialists for Tenerife (SxT), a split of PSOE in the island of Tenerife, between 2011 and 2015.

== See also ==
- United Left (Spain)
- Canarias Decide
- Communist Party of the Canaries
