= Nationalist Canarian Centre =

Nationalist Canarian Centre Centro Canario Nacionalista
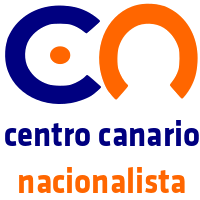
- President: Ignacio González Santiago
- Secretary-General: Juan Domínguez Bautista
- Founded: 15 September 1992
- Split from: Democratic and Social Centre
- Ideology: Centrism; Canarian nationalism
- National affiliation: Canarian Coalition (1993–2005)

Website
- www.centrocanario.org

Nationalist Canarian Centre (Spanish: Centro Canario Nacionalista, CCN) is a political party in the Canary Islands, founded in September 1992 as Independent Canarian Centre (Spanish: Centro Canario Independiente, CCI) by former Canarian President Lorenzo Olarte from splinter elements of the Democratic and Social Centre. It was a member of Canarian Coalition from 1993 to 19 November 2005.
