= Tenerife (Parliament of the Canary Islands constituency) =

Coordinates: 28°16′N 16°36′W

- Parliament of the Canary Islands; Electoral constituency
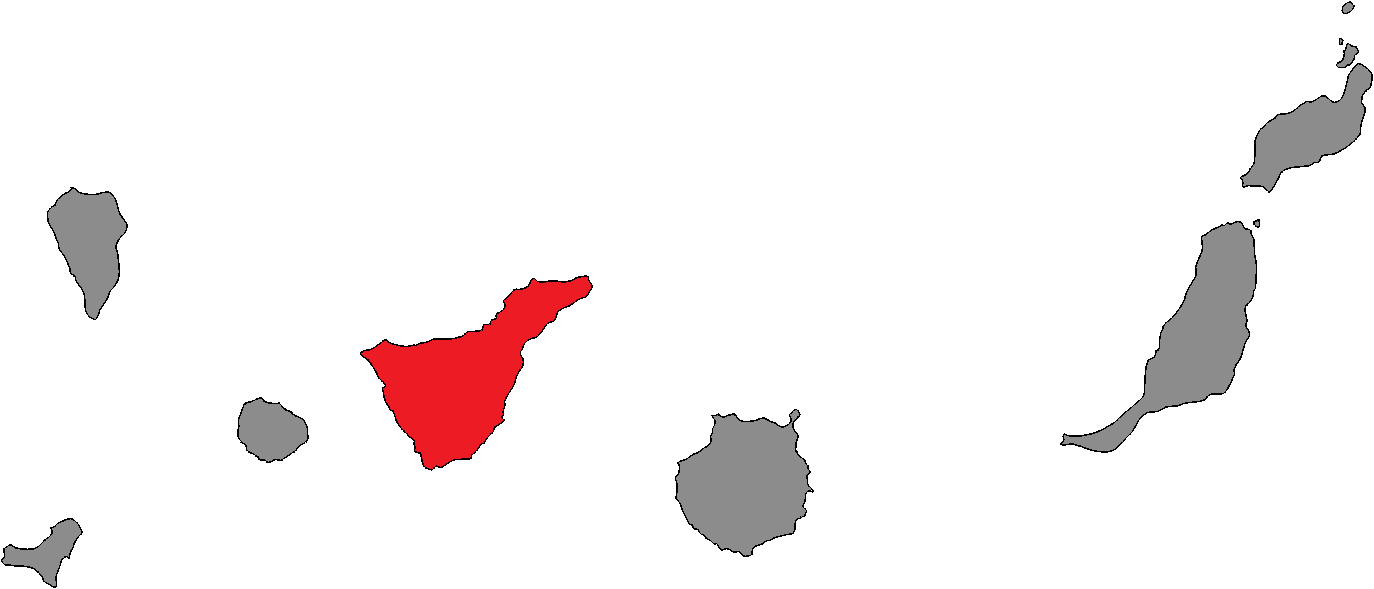
- Location of Tenerife within the Canary Islands
- Island: Tenerife
- Autonomous community: Canary Islands
- Population: ▲955,063 (2024)
- Electorate: ▲760,239 (2023)
- Major settlements: Santa Cruz de Tenerife, San Cristóbal de La Laguna, Arona

Current constituency
- Created: 1983
- Seats: 15
- Members: CCa (6); PSOE (5); PP (3); Vox (1)

Tenerife is one of the seven constituencies (Spanish: circunscripciones) represented in the Parliament of the Canary Islands, the regional legislature of the Autonomous Community of the Canary Islands. The constituency currently elects 15 deputies. Its boundaries correspond to those of the island of Tenerife. The electoral system uses the D'Hondt method and closed-list proportional representation, with a minimum threshold of fifteen percent in the constituency or four percent regionally.

== Electoral system ==
The constituency was created as per the Statute of Autonomy of the Canary Islands of 1982 and was first contested in the 1983 regional election. The Statute provides for the seven main islands in the Canarian archipelago—El Hierro, Fuerteventura, Gran Canaria, La Gomera, La Palma, Lanzarote and Tenerife—to be established as multi-member districts in the Parliament of the Canary Islands. Each constituency is allocated a fixed number of seats: 3 for El Hierro, 8 for Fuerteventura—7 until 2018—15 for Gran Canaria, 4 for La Gomera, 8 for La Palma, 8 for Lanzarote and 15 for Tenerife.

Voting is on the basis of universal suffrage, which comprises all nationals over eighteen, registered in the Canary Islands and in full enjoyment of their political rights. Amendments to the electoral law in 2011 required for Canarian citizens abroad to apply for voting before being permitted to vote, a system known as "begged" or expat vote (Spanish: Voto rogado) which was abolished in 2022. Seats are elected using the D'Hondt method and a closed list proportional representation, with an electoral threshold of 15 percent of valid votes—which includes blank ballots; until a 1997 reform, the threshold was set at 20 percent; between 1997 and 2018, it was set at 30 percent—being applied in each constituency. Alternatively, parties can also enter the seat distribution as long as they reach four percent regionally—three percent until 1997, six percent between 1997 and 2018.

The electoral law allows for parties and federations registered in the interior ministry, coalitions and groupings of electors to present lists of candidates. Parties and federations intending to form a coalition ahead of an election are required to inform the relevant Electoral Commission within ten days of the election call—fifteen before 1985—whereas groupings of electors need to secure the signature of at least one percent of the electorate in the constituencies for which they seek election—one-thousandth of the electorate, with a compulsory minimum of 500 signatures, until 1985—disallowing electors from signing for more than one list of candidates.

== Deputies ==
Deputies 1983–present
Key to parties UPC–AC ICAN Podemos SPC PSOE CDS Cs CCa AIC–ATI PP CP AP Vox
Cortes	Election	Distribution
1st	1983	1 / 8 / 1 / 5
2nd	1987	5 / 2 / 7 / 1
3rd	1991	1 / 6 / 7 / 1
4th	1995	4 / 7 / 4
5th	1999	5 / 7 / 3
6th	2003	5 / 8 / 2
7th	2007	5 / 7 / 3
8th	2011	3 / 7 / 5
9th	2015	2 / 4 / 6 / 3
10th	2019	1 / 6 / 1 / 5 / 2
11th	2023	5 / 6 / 3 / 1

== Regional elections ==
=== 2023 ===
Summary of the 28 May 2023 Parliament of the Canary Islands election results in Tenerife
Parties and alliances	Popular vote			Seats	
Parties and alliances	Votes	%	±pp	Total	+/−
Canarian Coalition (CCa)^{1}	123,240	31.27	+2.07	6	+1
Spanish Socialist Workers' Party (PSOE)	107,741	27.34	–2.86	5	–1
People's Party (PP)	71,382	18.11	+4.60	3	+1
Vox (Vox)	27,832	7.06	+4.71	1	+1
Drago Greens Canaries (DVC)	17,425	4.42	New	0	±0
United Yes We Can (Podemos–IUC–SSP)^{2}	16,441	4.17	–6.50	0	–1
New Canaries–Canarian Bloc (NC–BC)	9,460	2.40	+0.38	0	±0
Animalist Party with the Environment (PACMA)^{3}	7,088	1.80	+0.34	0	±0
Citizens–Party of the Citizenry (CS)	2,146	0.54	–6.45	0	–1
More Canaries (+C)	1,082	0.27	New	0	±0
Canarian Nationalist Party (PNC)	972	0.25	New	0	±0
Canaries Now–Communist Party of the Canarian People (ANC–UP–PCPC)^{4}	856	0.22	–0.19	0	±0
Seniors in Action (3e)	803	0.20	+0.09	0	±0
Gather Sustainable Canaries (Reunir)	761	0.19	New	0	±0
Democratic Union of the Canary Islands (UDC)	718	0.18	+0.04	0	±0
Blank ballots	6,169	1.57	+0.44		
Total	394,116			15	±0
Valid votes	394,116	98.35	–0.84		
Invalid votes	6,632	1.65	+0.84		
Votes cast / turnout	400,748	52.71	–0.52		
Abstentions	359,491	47.29	+0.52		
Registered voters	760,239				
Sources
Footnotes: ^{1} Canarian Coalition results are compared to Canarian Coalition–Canarian Nationalist Party totals in the 2019 election.; ^{2} United We Can results are compared to the combined totals of Yes We Can Canaries and Canarian United Left in the 2019 election.; ^{3} Animalist Party with the Environment results are compared to Animalist Party Against Mistreatment of Animals totals in the 2019 election.; ^{4} Canaries Now–Communist Party of the Canarian People results are compared to the combined totals of Canaries Now and Communist Party of the Canarian People in the 2019 election.

=== 2019 ===
Summary of the 26 May 2019 Parliament of the Canary Islands election results in Tenerife
Parties and alliances	Popular vote			Seats	
Parties and alliances	Votes	%	±pp	Total	+/−
Spanish Socialist Workers' Party (PSOE)	116,352	30.20	+8.23	6	+2
Canarian Coalition–Canarian Nationalist Party (CCa–PNC)^{1}	112,513	29.20	+0.59	5	–1
People's Party (PP)	52,064	13.51	–3.98	2	–1
Yes We Can Canaries (Podemos–SSP–Equo)^{2}	37,081	9.62	–3.74	1	–1
Citizens–Party of the Citizenry (Cs)	26,944	6.99	+0.89	1	+1
Vox (Vox)	9,040	2.35	+2.13	0	±0
New Canaries (NCa)	7,768	2.02	–1.42	0	±0
Animalist Party Against Mistreatment of Animals (PACMA)	5,623	1.46	–0.05	0	±0
Canarian United Left (IUC)^{3}	4,032	1.05	–1.57	0	±0
The Greens–Green Group (LV–GV)	2,548	0.66	New	0	±0
Tenerife Socialist Group (ASTf)	1,512	0.39	New	0	±0
Santa Cruz Common Sense (SCSC)	1,379	0.36	New	0	±0
Canaries Now (ANC–UP)^{4}	1,226	0.32	–0.68	0	±0
Nivaria (Nivaria)	1,153	0.30	New	0	±0
Democratic Union of the Canary Islands (UDC)	522	0.14	New	0	±0
Seniors in Action (3e en acción)	437	0.11	New	0	±0
With You, We Are Democracy (Contigo)	359	0.09	New	0	±0
Communist Party of the Canarian People (PCPC)	356	0.09	–0.10	0	±0
Blank ballots	4,360	1.13	–0.71		
Total	385,269			15	±0
Valid votes	385,269	99.19	+0.71		
Invalid votes	3,522	0.91	–0.71		
Votes cast / turnout	388,791	53.23	–2.07		
Abstentions	341,571	46.77	+2.07		
Registered voters	730,362				
Sources
Footnotes: ^{1} Canarian Coalition–Canarian Nationalist Party results are compared to the combined totals of Canarian Coalition–Canarian Nationalist Party and United in the 2015 election.; ^{2} Yes We Can Canaries results are compared to We Can totals in the 2015 election.; ^{3} Canarian United Left results are compared to Canaries Decides totals in the 2015 election.; ^{4} Canaries Now results are compared to Canarian Nationalist Alternative totals in the 2015 election.

=== 2015 ===
Summary of the 24 May 2015 Parliament of the Canary Islands election results in Tenerife
Parties and alliances	Popular vote			Seats	
Parties and alliances	Votes	%	±pp	Total	+/−
Canarian Coalition–Canarian Nationalist Party (CCa–PNC)	106,217	27.64	–8.97	6	–1
Spanish Socialist Workers' Party (PSOE)	84,408	21.97	+1.75	4	+1
People's Party (PP)	67,202	17.49	–8.14	3	–2
We Can (Podemos)	51,346	13.36	New	2	+2
Citizens–Party of the Citizenry (C's)	23,428	6.10	New	0	±0
New Canaries (NCa)	13,220	3.44	–1.24	0	±0
Canaries Decides (IUC–LV–UP–ALTER)^{1}	10,049	2.62	+0.78	0	±0
Animalist Party Against Mistreatment of Animals (PACMA)	5,818	1.51	+1.13	0	±0
Canarian Nationalist Alternative (ANC)	3,829	1.00	–0.26	0	±0
United (CCN–Unidos)	3,711	0.97	New	0	±0
Union, Progress and Democracy (UPyD)	3,313	0.86	–0.05	0	±0
For a Fairer World (PUM+J)	905	0.24	+0.03	0	±0
Vox (Vox)	851	0.22	New	0	±0
Blank Seats (EB)	766	0.20	New	0	±0
Communist Party of the Canarian People (PCPC)	730	0.19	–0.11	0	±0
Movement for the Unity of the Canarian People (MUPC)	727	0.19	+0.03	0	±0
Zero Cuts (Recortes Cero)	644	0.17	New	0	±0
Blank ballots	7,071	1.84	–0.68		
Total	384,235			15	±0
Valid votes	384,235	98.38	+0.61		
Invalid votes	6,342	1.62	–0.61		
Votes cast / turnout	390,577	55.30	–3.66		
Abstentions	315,759	44.70	+3.66		
Registered voters	706,336				
Sources
Footnotes: ^{1} Canaries Decides results are compared to The Greens totals in the 2011 election.

=== 2011 ===
Summary of the 22 May 2011 Parliament of the Canary Islands election results in Tenerife
Parties and alliances	Popular vote			Seats	
Parties and alliances	Votes	%	±pp	Total	+/−
Canarian Coalition–Nationalist Party–Canarian Centre (CC–PNC–CCN)^{1}	142,401	36.61	–7.98	7	±0
People's Party (PP)	99,673	25.63	+9.09	5	+2
Spanish Socialist Workers' Party (PSOE)	78,645	20.22	–11.99	3	–2
Socialists for Tenerife–The Greens–New Canaries (NCa)	18,205	4.68	New	0	±0
Yes We Can Citizens' Alternative (ACSSP)^{2}	15,167	3.90	+3.28	0	±0
The Greens (Verdes)	7,168	1.84	–0.16	0	±0
Canarian Nationalist Alternative (ANC)	4,890	1.26	New	0	±0
Union, Progress and Democracy (UPyD)	3,530	0.91	New	0	±0
Canarian Patriotic Movement (MPC)	2,589	0.67	New	0	±0
Anti-Bullfighting Party Against Mistreatment of Animals (PACMA)	1,461	0.38	New	0	±0
Party for Services and Public Employed (PSyEP)	1,292	0.33	New	0	±0
Communist Party of the Canarian People (PCPC)	1,179	0.30	+0.11	0	±0
For a Fairer World (PUM+J)	803	0.21	New	0	±0
Humanist Party (PH)	618	0.16	+0.06	0	±0
Movement for the Unity of the Canarian People (MUPC)	616	0.16	+0.07	0	±0
Liberal Democratic Centre (CDL)	550	0.14	New	0	±0
Canarian Social Democratic Centre (CSDC)	361	0.09	New	0	±0
Blank ballots	9,792	2.52	+1.06		
Total	388,940			15	±0
Valid votes	388,940	97.77	–1.73		
Invalid votes	8,868	2.23	+1.73		
Votes cast / turnout	397,808	58.96	–1.31		
Abstentions	276,889	41.04	+1.31		
Registered voters	674,697				
Sources
Footnotes: ^{1} Canarian Coalition–Nationalist Party–Canarian Centre results are compared to the combined totals of Canarian Coalition–Canarian Nationalist Party and Canarian Centre in the 2007 election.; ^{2} Yes We Can Citizens' Alternative results are compared to Canarian Popular Alternative–25 May Citizens' Alternative totals in the 2007 election.

=== 2007 ===
Summary of the 27 May 2007 Parliament of the Canary Islands election results in Tenerife
Parties and alliances	Popular vote			Seats	
Parties and alliances	Votes	%	±pp	Total	+/−
Canarian Coalition–Canarian Nationalist Party (CC–PNC)^{1}	155,385	39.59	–7.40	7	–1
Spanish Socialist Workers' Party (PSOE)	126,422	32.21	+1.65	5	±0
People's Party (PP)	64,907	16.54	+1.01	3	+1
Canarian Centre (CCN)	19,632	5.00	New	0	±0
The Greens (Verdes)	7,835	2.00	–0.47	0	±0
Canarian United Left (IUC)	3,658	0.93	–0.35	0	±0
Canarian Nationalist Alternative (ANC)	2,539	0.65	New	0	±0
Canarian Popular Alternative–25 May Citizens' Alternative (APCa–AC25M)^{2}	2,453	0.62	–0.71	0	±0
Centre Coalition (CCCAN)	1,006	0.26	New	0	±0
Communist Party of the Canarian People (PCPC)	563	0.14	–0.05	0	±0
Citizens' Union–Independent Progressives of Canaries (UC–PIC)	557	0.14	New	0	±0
Commitment to Tenerife (CTF)	466	0.12	New	0	±0
Humanist Party (PH)	389	0.10	–0.03	0	±0
Movement for the Unity of the Canarian People (MUPC)	336	0.09	New	0	±0
The Phalanx (FE)	327	0.08	New	0	±0
National Democracy (DN)	302	0.08	New	0	±0
Blank ballots	5,731	1.46	+0.19		
Total	392,508			15	±0
Valid votes	392,508	99.50	±0.00		
Invalid votes	1,974	0.50	±0.00		
Votes cast / turnout	394,482	58.80	–3.67		
Abstentions	276,369	41.20	+3.67		
Registered voters	670,851				
Sources
Footnotes: ^{1} Canarian Coalition–Canarian Nationalist Party results are compared to the combined totals of Canarian Coalition and Canarian Nationalist Federation in the 2003 election.; ^{2} Canarian Popular Alternative–25 May Citizens' Alternative results are compared to Canarian Popular Alternative totals in the 2003 election.

=== 2003 ===
Summary of the 25 May 2003 Parliament of the Canary Islands election results in Tenerife
Parties and alliances	Popular vote			Seats	
Parties and alliances	Votes	%	±pp	Total	+/−
Canarian Coalition (CC)	167,224	44.33	+1.36	8	+1
Spanish Socialist Workers' Party (PSOE)	115,275	30.56	+1.94	5	±0
People's Party (PP)	58,600	15.53	–0.63	2	–1
Canarian Nationalist Federation (FNC)	10,038	2.66	–1.82	0	±0
The Greens of the Canaries (Verdes)	9,302	2.47	+0.67	0	±0
Canarian Popular Alternative (APCa)	5,011	1.33	New	0	±0
Canarian United Left (IUC)	4,825	1.28	–1.63	0	±0
Communist Party of the Canarian People (PCPC)	704	0.19	New	0	±0
Tenerife Union (UTI)	571	0.15	New	0	±0
Humanist Party (PH)	473	0.13	–0.06	0	±0
Party of The People (LG)	448	0.12	New	0	±0
Blank ballots	4,775	1.27	–0.54		
Total	377,246			15	±0
Valid votes	377,246	99.50	+0.06		
Invalid votes	1,902	0.50	–0.06		
Votes cast / turnout	379,148	62.47	+2.64		
Abstentions	227,794	37.53	–2.64		
Registered voters	606,942				

=== 1999 ===
Summary of the 13 June 1999 Parliament of the Canary Islands election results in Tenerife
Parties and alliances	Popular vote			Seats	
Parties and alliances	Votes	%	±pp	Total	+/−
Canarian Coalition (CC)	145,363	42.97	+3.81	7	±0
Spanish Socialist Workers' Party (PSOE)	96,820	28.62	+1.63	5	+1
People's Party (PP)	54,660	16.16	–8.44	3	–1
Canarian Nationalist Federation (FNC)	15,141	4.48	New	0	±0
Canarian United Left (IUC)	9,835	2.91	–2.27	0	±0
The Greens of the Canaries (Verdes)	6,081	1.80	New	0	±0
Centrist Union–Democratic and Social Centre (UC–CDS)	2,829	0.84	+0.16	0	±0
Canarian Alternative–Independent Citizens of the Canaries (AC–CICA)	806	0.24	New	0	±0
Humanist Party (PH)	632	0.19	±0.00	0	±0
Blank ballots	6,138	1.81	+0.62		
Total	338,305			15	±0
Valid votes	338,305	99.44	+0.06		
Invalid votes	1,903	0.56	–0.06		
Votes cast / turnout	340,208	59.83	–1.86		
Abstentions	228,456	40.17	+1.86		
Registered voters	568,664				
Sources
Footnotes: ^{1} Canarian Nationalist Federation results are compared to Nationalist Canarian Platform totals in the 1995 election.

=== 1995 ===
Summary of the 28 May 1995 Parliament of the Canary Islands election results in Tenerife
Parties and alliances	Popular vote			Seats	
Parties and alliances	Votes	%	±pp	Total	+/−
Canarian Coalition (CC)^{1}	127,075	39.16	–10.76	7	–1
Spanish Socialist Workers' Party (PSOE)	87,588	26.99	–6.75	4	–2
People's Party (PP)	79,828	24.60	+15.30	4	+3
Canarian United Left (IUC)	16,809	5.18	New	0	±0
National Congress of the Canaries (CNC)	2,964	0.91	New	0	±0
Democratic and Social Centre–Centrist Union (CDS–UC)	2,218	0.68	–3.90	0	±0
Tenerife Assembly (ATF)	1,600	0.49	New	0	±0
Green Left of the Canary Islands (Izegzawen)	1,357	0.42	New	0	±0
Party of The People (LG)	625	0.19	–0.14	0	±0
Humanist Platform (PH)	615	0.19	New	0	±0
Blank ballots	3,852	1.19	+0.32		
Total	324,531			15	±0
Valid votes	324,531	99.38	+0.23		
Invalid votes	2,027	0.62	–0.23		
Votes cast / turnout	326,558	61.69	+2.00		
Abstentions	202,757	38.31	–2.00		
Registered voters	529,315				
Sources
Footnotes: ^{1} Canarian Coalition results are compared to the combined totals of Canarian Independent Groups–Tenerife Group of Independents, Canarian Initiative and Canarian Nationalist Party in the 1991 election.

=== 1991 ===
Summary of the 26 May 1991 Parliament of the Canary Islands election results in Tenerife
Parties and alliances	Popular vote			Seats	
Parties and alliances	Votes	%	±pp	Total	+/−
Canarian Independent Groups–Tenerife Group of Independents (AIC–ATI)	113,562	40.78	–0.85	7	±0
Spanish Socialist Workers' Party (PSOE)	93,945	33.74	+5.61	6	+1
People's Party (PP)^{1}	25,892	9.30	+2.72	1	±0
Canarian Initiative (ICAN)^{2}	22,726	8.16	–1.29	1	+1
Democratic and Social Centre (CDS)	12,762	4.58	–7.42	0	–2
Canarian Nationalist Party (PNC)	2,731	0.98	New	0	±0
Canarian Coalition for Independence (CI (FREPIC–Awañac))	2,118	0.76	+0.36	0	±0
Workers' Socialist Party (PST)	1,346	0.48	+0.10	0	±0
Party of The People (LG)	930	0.33	New	0	±0
Blank ballots	2,433	0.87	+0.34		
Total	278,445			15	±0
Valid votes	278,445	99.15	+0.16		
Invalid votes	2,383	0.85	–0.16		
Votes cast / turnout	280,828	59.69	–8.02		
Abstentions	189,632	40.31	+8.02		
Registered voters	470,460				
Sources
Footnotes: ^{1} People's Party results are compared to People's Alliance totals in the 1987 election.; ^{2} Canarian Initiative results are compared to the combined totals of Canarian Assembly–Canarian Nationalist Left, United Canarian Left and Union of Left Nationalists in the 1987 election.

=== 1987 ===
Summary of the 10 June 1987 Parliament of the Canary Islands election results in Tenerife
Parties and alliances	Popular vote			Seats	
Parties and alliances	Votes	%	±pp	Total	+/−
Canarian Independent Groups–Tenerife Group of Independents (AIC–ATI)	115,008	41.63	New	7	+7
Spanish Socialist Workers' Party (PSOE)	77,701	28.13	–18.94	5	–3
Democratic and Social Centre (CDS)	33,141	12.00	+4.73	2	+1
People's Alliance (AP)^{1}	18,168	6.58	–23.92	1	–4
Canarian Assembly–Canarian Nationalist Left (AC–INC)^{2}	15,234	5.51	–4.34	0	–1
United Canarian Left (ICU)^{3}	9,598	3.47	+0.78	0	±0
National Congress of the Canaries (CNC)	2,066	0.75	New	0	±0
Union of Left Nationalists (UNI)	1,287	0.47	New	0	±0
Popular Front of the Canary Islands–Awañac (FREPIC–Awañac)	1,106	0.40	New	0	±0
Workers' Socialist Party (PST)	1,054	0.38	–0.66	0	±0
Humanist Platform (PH)	433	0.16	New	0	±0
Blank ballots	1,477	0.53	+0.53		
Total	276,273			15	±0
Valid votes	276,273	98.99	+1.34		
Invalid votes	2,817	1.01	–1.34		
Votes cast / turnout	279,090	67.71	+5.67		
Abstentions	133,076	32.29	–5.67		
Registered voters	412,166				
Sources
Footnotes: ^{1} People's Alliance results are compared to People's Coalition totals in the 1983 election.; ^{2} Canarian Assembly–Canarian Nationalist Left results are compared to Canarian People's Union–Canarian Assembly totals in the 1983 election.; ^{3} United Canarian Left results are compared to Communist Party of the Canaries totals in the 1983 election.

=== 1983 ===
Summary of the 8 May 1983 Parliament of the Canary Islands election results in Tenerife
Parties and alliances	Popular vote			Seats	
Parties and alliances	Votes	%	±pp	Total	+/−
Spanish Socialist Workers' Party (PSOE)	106,492	47.07	n/a	8	n/a
People's Coalition (AP–PDP–UL)	69,011	30.50	n/a	5	n/a
Canarian People's Union–Canarian Assembly (UPC–AC)	22,289	9.85	n/a	1	n/a
Democratic and Social Centre (CDS)	16,438	7.27	n/a	1	n/a
Communist Party of the Canaries (PCC–PCE)	6,075	2.69	n/a	0	n/a
Seven Green Stars (SEV)	2,709	1.20	n/a	0	n/a
Workers' Socialist Party (PST)	2,359	1.04	n/a	0	n/a
Revolutionary Communist League (LCR)	877	0.39	n/a	0	n/a
Blank ballots	0	0.00	n/a		
Total	226,250			15	n/a
Valid votes	226,250	97.65	n/a		
Invalid votes	5,434	2.35	n/a		
Votes cast / turnout	231,684	62.04	n/a		
Abstentions	141,737	37.96	n/a		
Registered voters	373,421				

== Bibliography ==
- Government of the Canary Islands (November 1987). Resultados procesos electorales en Canarias. Elecciones Locales: Ayuntamientos y Cabildos (1979-1983-1987). Elecciones Autonómicas: Parlamento de Canarias (1983-1987) (PDF) (in Spanish). Las Palmas de Gran Canaria: Statistics and Documentation Center of the Canary Islands. pp. 203–270. Archived from the original on 2017-04-17.
