= Gran Canaria (Parliament of the Canary Islands constituency) =

Coordinates: 27°57′N 15°35′W

- Parliament of the Canary Islands; Electoral constituency
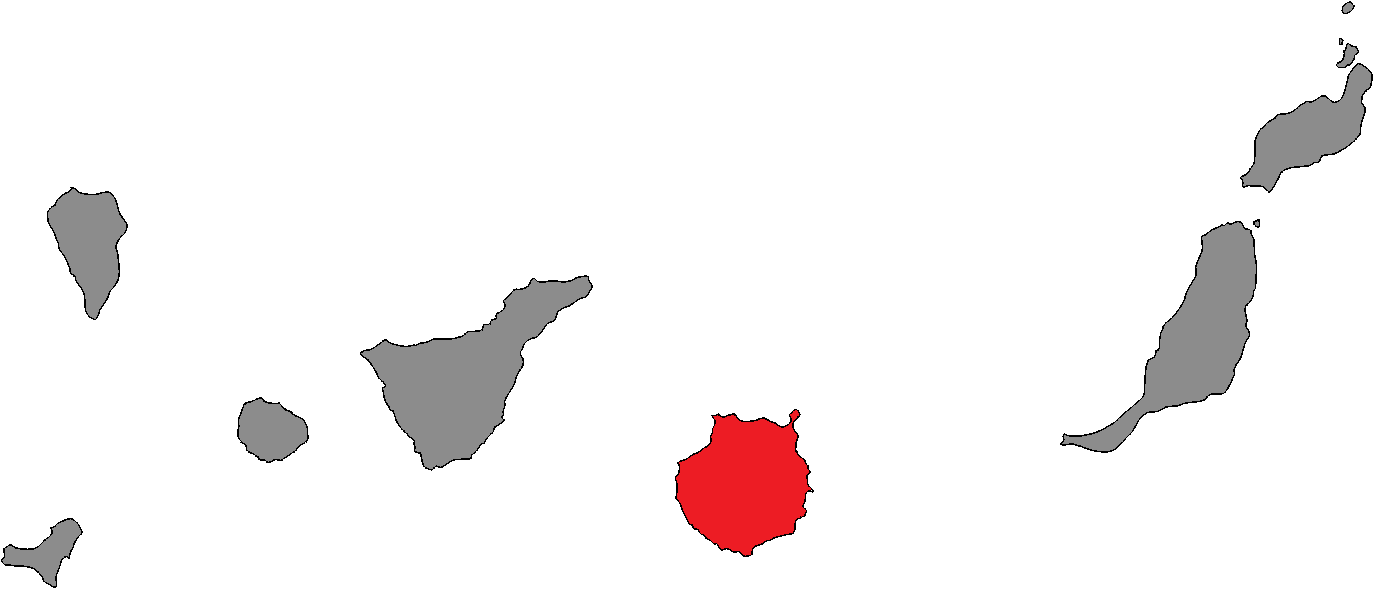
- Location of Gran Canaria within the Canary Islands
- Island: Gran Canaria
- Autonomous community: Canary Islands
- Population: ▲863,943 (2024)
- Electorate: ▲724,011 (2023)
- Major settlements: Las Palmas, Telde, Santa Lucía de Tirajana, San Bartolomé de Tirajana

Current constituency
- Created: 1983
- Seats: 15
- Members: PSOE (5); PP (4); NC–BC (3); Vox (2); CCa (1)

Gran Canaria is one of the seven constituencies (Spanish: circunscripciones) represented in the Parliament of the Canary Islands, the regional legislature of the Autonomous Community of the Canary Islands. The constituency currently elects 15 deputies. Its boundaries correspond to those of the island of Gran Canaria. The electoral system uses the D'Hondt method and closed-list proportional representation, with a minimum threshold of fifteen percent in the constituency or four percent regionally.

== Electoral system ==
The constituency was created as per the Statute of Autonomy of the Canary Islands of 1982 and was first contested in the 1983 regional election. The Statute provides for the seven main islands in the Canarian archipelago—El Hierro, Fuerteventura, Gran Canaria, La Gomera, La Palma, Lanzarote and Tenerife—to be established as multi-member districts in the Parliament of the Canary Islands. Each constituency is allocated a fixed number of seats: 3 for El Hierro, 8 for Fuerteventura—7 until 2018—15 for Gran Canaria, 4 for La Gomera, 8 for La Palma, 8 for Lanzarote and 15 for Tenerife.

Voting is on the basis of universal suffrage, which comprises all nationals over eighteen, registered in the Canary Islands and in full enjoyment of their political rights. Amendments to the electoral law in 2011 required for Canarian citizens abroad to apply for voting before being permitted to vote, a system known as "begged" or expat vote (Spanish: Voto rogado) which was abolished in 2022. Seats are elected using the D'Hondt method and a closed list proportional representation, with an electoral threshold of 15 percent of valid votes—which includes blank ballots; until a 1997 reform, the threshold was set at 20 percent; between 1997 and 2018, it was set at 30 percent—being applied in each constituency. Alternatively, parties can also enter the seat distribution as long as they reach four percent regionally—three percent until 1997, six percent between 1997 and 2018.

The electoral law allows for parties and federations registered in the interior ministry, coalitions and groupings of electors to present lists of candidates. Parties and federations intending to form a coalition ahead of an election are required to inform the relevant Electoral Commission within ten days of the election call—fifteen before 1985—whereas groupings of electors need to secure the signature of at least one percent of the electorate in the constituencies for which they seek election—one-thousandth of the electorate, with a compulsory minimum of 500 signatures, until 1985—disallowing electors from signing for more than one list of candidates.

== Deputies ==
Deputies 1983–present
Key to parties ICU UPC–AC AC–INC ICAN Podemos SPC PSOE NCa CDS Cs CNC CCa PP CP AP Vox
Cortes	Election	Distribution
1st	1983	1 / 7 / 1 / 1 / 5
2nd	1987	1 / 2 / 5 / 4 / 3
3rd	1991	3 / 5 / 4 / 3
4th	1995	3 / 5 / 7
5th	1999	3 / 5 / 7
6th	2003	3 / 4 / 8
7th	2007	7 / 1 / 7
8th	2011	4 / 2 / 1 / 8
9th	2015	3 / 3 / 4 / 1 / 4
10th	2019	1 / 5 / 3 / 1 / 2 / 3
11th	2023	5 / 3 / 1 / 4 / 2

== Regional elections ==
=== 2023 ===
Summary of the 28 May 2023 Parliament of the Canary Islands election results in Gran Canaria
Parties and alliances	Popular vote			Seats	
Parties and alliances	Votes	%	±pp	Total	+/−
Spanish Socialist Workers' Party (PSOE)	103,153	28.05	–0.21	5	±0
People's Party (PP)	78,462	21.34	+4.79	4	+1
New Canaries–Canarian Bloc (NC–BC)	53,140	14.45	–3.21	3	±0
Vox (Vox)	36,528	9.93	+7.23	2	+2
Canarian Coalition (CCa)^{1}	34,990	9.51	–2.15	1	–1
United for Gran Canaria (UxGC)	17,153	4.66	New	0	±0
United Yes We Can (Podemos–IUC–SSP)^{2}	15,334	4.17	–5.47	0	–1
Drago Greens Canaries (DVC)	7,589	2.06	New	0	±0
Animalist Party with the Environment (PACMA)^{3}	4,102	1.12	–0.09	0	±0
Let's Talk Now (Hablemos Ahora)	4,030	1.10	New	0	±0
Citizens–Party of the Citizenry (CS)	1,364	0.37	–8.53	0	–1
Canaries Now–Communist Party of the Canarian People (ANC–UP–PCPC)^{4}	1,250	0.34	–0.14	0	±0
Canarian Nationalist Party (PNC)	1,154	0.31	New	0	±0
Gather Sustainable Canaries (Reunir)	1,136	0.31	New	0	±0
Seniors in Action (3e)	1,026	0.28	+0.15	0	±0
With You, We Are Democracy (Contigo)	454	0.12	+0.04	0	±0
Blank ballots	6,878	1.87	+0.63		
Total	367,743			15	±0
Valid votes	367,743	98.03	–0.83		
Invalid votes	7,407	1.97	+0.83		
Votes cast / turnout	375,150	51.82	–0.55		
Abstentions	348,861	48.18	+0.55		
Registered voters	724,011				
Sources
Footnotes: ^{1} Canarian Coalition results are compared to Canarian Coalition–Canarian Nationalist Party–United totals in the 2019 election.; ^{2} United We Can results are compared to the combined totals of Yes We Can Canaries and Canarian United Left in the 2019 election.; ^{3} Animalist Party with the Environment results are compared to Animalist Party Against Mistreatment of Animals totals in the 2019 election.; ^{4} Canaries Now–Communist Party of the Canarian People results are compared to the combined totals of Canaries Now and Communist Party of the Canarian People in the 2019 election.

=== 2019 ===
Summary of the 26 May 2019 Parliament of the Canary Islands election results in Gran Canaria
Parties and alliances	Popular vote			Seats	
Parties and alliances	Votes	%	±pp	Total	+/−
Spanish Socialist Workers' Party (PSOE)	102,596	28.26	+10.75	5	+2
New Canaries (NCa)	64,125	17.66	–0.78	3	–1
People's Party (PP)	60,086	16.55	–3.84	3	–1
Canarian Coalition–Canarian Nationalist Party (CCa–PNC)^{1}	42,324	11.66	–0.59	2	+1
Yes We Can Canaries (Podemos–SSP–Equo)^{2}	32,395	8.92	–8.12	1	–2
Citizens–Party of the Citizenry (Cs)	32,317	8.90	+2.61	1	+1
Vox (Vox)	9,800	2.70	+2.45	0	±0
Animalist Party Against Mistreatment of Animals (PACMA)	4,406	1.21	+0.17	0	±0
Canarian United Left (IUC)^{3}	2,612	0.72	–1.13	0	±0
The Greens–Green Group (LV–GV)	2,510	0.69	New	0	±0
More for Telde (+xT)	1,985	0.55	–0.32	0	±0
Canaries Now (ANC–UP)^{4}	1,113	0.31	+0.09	0	±0
Communist Party of the Canarian People (PCPC)	633	0.17	–0.12	0	±0
For a Fairer World (PUM+J)	575	0.16	–0.08	0	±0
Seniors in Action (3e en acción)	474	0.13	New	0	±0
Humanist Party (PH)	337	0.09	New	0	±0
With You, We Are Democracy (Contigo)	298	0.08	New	0	±0
Blank ballots	4,506	1.24	–0.55		
Total	363,092			15	±0
Valid votes	363,092	98.86	+0.63		
Invalid votes	4,177	1.14	–0.63		
Votes cast / turnout	367,269	52.37	–6.08		
Abstentions	334,002	47.63	+6.08		
Registered voters	701,271				
Sources
Footnotes: ^{1} Canarian Coalition–Canarian Nationalist Party results are compared to the combined totals of Canarian Coalition–Canarian Nationalist Party and United in the 2015 election.; ^{2} Yes We Can Canaries results are compared to We Can totals in the 2015 election.; ^{3} Canarian United Left results are compared to Canaries Decides totals in the 2015 election.; ^{4} Canaries Now results are compared to Canarian Nationalist Alternative totals in the 2015 election.

=== 2015 ===
Summary of the 24 May 2015 Parliament of the Canary Islands election results in Gran Canaria
Parties and alliances	Popular vote			Seats	
Parties and alliances	Votes	%	±pp	Total	+/−
People's Party (PP)	79,652	20.39	–20.96	4	–4
New Canaries (NCa)	72,005	18.44	+4.17	4	+2
Spanish Socialist Workers' Party (PSOE)	68,390	17.51	–3.58	3	–1
We Can (Podemos)	66,552	17.04	New	3	+3
Citizens–Party of the Citizenry (C's)	24,573	6.29	New	0	±0
Canarian Coalition–Canarian Nationalist Party (CCa–PNC)	24,392	6.25	–3.00	1	±0
United (Unidos)^{1}	23,428	6.00	+4.05	0	±0
Canaries Decides (IUC–LV–UP–ALTER)^{2}	7,240	1.85	–2.22	0	±0
Animalist Party Against Mistreatment of Animals (PACMA)	4,065	1.04	+0.75	0	±0
Union, Progress and Democracy (UPyD)	3,593	0.92	–0.25	0	±0
More for Telde (+xT)	3,390	0.87	New	0	±0
Communist Party of the Canarian People (PCPC)	1,131	0.29	–0.02	0	±0
Vox (Vox)	963	0.25	New	0	±0
For a Fairer World (PUM+J)	922	0.24	+0.07	0	±0
Canarian Nationalist Alternative (ANC)	853	0.22	–0.20	0	±0
Movement for the Unity of the Canarian People (MUPC)	762	0.20	+0.11	0	±0
Zero Cuts (Recortes Cero)	760	0.19	New	0	±0
Blank Seats (EB)	597	0.15	New	0	±0
Internationalist Solidarity and Self-Management (SAIn)	330	0.08	New	0	±0
Blank ballots	6,981	1.79	–1.30		
Total	390,579			15	±0
Valid votes	390,579	98.23	+1.39		
Invalid votes	7,057	1.77	–1.39		
Votes cast / turnout	397,636	58.45	–1.42		
Abstentions	282,719	41.55	+1.42		
Registered voters	680,355				
Sources
Footnotes: ^{1} United results are compared to Commitment to Gran Canaria totals in the 2011 election.; ^{2} Canaries Decides results are compared to the combined totals of The Greens, Canarian United Left and Unity of the People in the 2011 election.

=== 2011 ===
Summary of the 22 May 2011 Parliament of the Canary Islands election results in Gran Canaria
Parties and alliances	Popular vote			Seats	
Parties and alliances	Votes	%	±pp	Total	+/−
People's Party (PP)	156,200	41.35	+7.16	8	+1
Spanish Socialist Workers' Party (PSOE)	79,644	21.09	–16.76	4	–3
New Canaries–New Gran Canaria (NCa)	53,893	14.27	+2.52	2	+2
Canarian Coalition–Nationalist Party–Canarian Centre (CC–PNC–CCN)^{1}	34,931	9.25	+0.64	1	±0
The Greens (Verdes)	9,049	2.40	+0.38	0	±0
Commitment to Gran Canaria (CGCa)	7,382	1.95	–0.21	0	±0
Canarian United Left (IUC)	5,252	1.39	+0.84	0	±0
Common Sense in the Canaries (SCC)	4,761	1.26	New	0	±0
Union, Progress and Democracy (UPyD)	4,432	1.17	New	0	±0
Yes We Can Citizens' Alternative (ACSSP)^{2}	2,453	0.65	+0.49	0	±0
Canarian Nationalist Alternative (ANC)	1,604	0.42	New	0	±0
Communist Party of the Canarian People (PCPC)	1,189	0.31	+0.11	0	±0
Anti-Bullfighting Party Against Mistreatment of Animals (PACMA)	1,101	0.29	New	0	±0
Unity of the People (UP)	1,056	0.28	New	0	±0
Party for Services and Public Employed (PSyEP)	701	0.19	New	0	±0
For a Fairer World (PUM+J)	639	0.17	New	0	±0
Humanist Party (PH)	628	0.17	+0.07	0	±0
Liberal Democratic Centre (CDL)	468	0.12	New	0	±0
Movement for the Unity of the Canarian People (MUPC)	350	0.09	+0.01	0	±0
National Democracy (DN)	314	0.08	New	0	±0
Blank ballots	11,675	3.09	+1.76		
Total	377,722			15	±0
Valid votes	377,722	96.84	–2.57		
Invalid votes	12,327	3.16	+2.57		
Votes cast / turnout	390,049	59.87	–2.47		
Abstentions	261,429	40.13	+2.47		
Registered voters	651,478				
Sources
Footnotes: ^{1} Canarian Coalition–Nationalist Party–Canarian Centre results are compared to the combined totals of Canarian Coalition–Canarian Nationalist Party and Canarian Centre in the 2007 election.; ^{2} Yes We Can Citizens' Alternative results are compared to Canarian Popular Alternative–25 May Citizens' Alternative totals in the 2007 election.

=== 2007 ===
Summary of the 27 May 2007 Parliament of the Canary Islands election results in Gran Canaria
Parties and alliances	Popular vote			Seats	
Parties and alliances	Votes	%	±pp	Total	+/−
Spanish Socialist Workers' Party (PSOE)	149,183	37.85	+17.29	7	+4
People's Party (PP)	134,744	34.19	–13.25	7	–1
New Canaries–New Gran Canaria (NCa)	46,303	11.75	New	0	±0
Canarian Coalition–Canarian Nationalist Party (CC–PNC)^{1}	21,338	5.41	–20.85	1	–3
Canarian Centre (CCN)	12,602	3.20	New	0	±0
Commitment to Gran Canaria (CGCa)	8,512	2.16	New	0	±0
The Greens (Verdes)	7,957	2.02	New	0	±0
Canarian United Left (IUC)	2,186	0.55	–0.89	0	±0
Unity of the People (UP)	1,485	0.38	New	0	±0
Nationalist Maga Alternative (AMAGA)	1,079	0.27	New	0	±0
Party of Gran Canaria (PGC)	1,073	0.27	New	0	±0
Communist Party of the Canarian People (PCPC)	775	0.20	–0.06	0	±0
Canarian Popular Alternative–25 May Citizens' Alternative (APCa–AC25M)^{2}	645	0.16	–0.18	0	±0
Humanist Party (PH)	388	0.10	–0.11	0	±0
Movement for the Unity of the Canarian People (MUPC)	304	0.08	New	0	±0
Pensionist Assembly of the Canaries (TPC)	280	0.07	–0.04	0	±0
Blank ballots	5,241	1.33	+0.06		
Total	394,095			15	±0
Valid votes	394,095	99.41	–0.01		
Invalid votes	2,346	0.59	+0.01		
Votes cast / turnout	396,441	62.34	–5.49		
Abstentions	239,454	37.66	+5.49		
Registered voters	635,895				
Sources
Footnotes: ^{1} Canarian Coalition–Canarian Nationalist Party results are compared to the combined totals of Canarian Coalition and Canarian Union–Canarian Nationalist Federation in the 2003 election.; ^{2} Canarian Popular Alternative–25 May Citizens' Alternative results are compared to Canarian Popular Alternative totals in the 2003 election.

=== 2003 ===
Summary of the 25 May 2003 Parliament of the Canary Islands election results in Gran Canaria
Parties and alliances	Popular vote			Seats	
Parties and alliances	Votes	%	±pp	Total	+/−
People's Party (PP)	193,529	47.44	+7.11	8	+1
Canarian Coalition (CC)	88,281	21.64	–10.20	4	–1
Spanish Socialist Workers' Party (PSOE)	83,864	20.56	+2.14	3	±0
Canarian Union–Canarian Nationalist Federation (UC–FNC)	18,840	4.62	+1.56	0	±0
The Greens of the Canaries (Verdes)	8,191	2.01	+0.54	0	±0
Canarian United Left (IUC)	5,864	1.44	–1.19	0	±0
Canarian Popular Alternative (APCa)	1,400	0.34	New	0	±0
Communist Party of the Canarian People (PCPC)	1,072	0.26	New	0	±0
Humanist Party (PH)	849	0.21	+0.02	0	±0
Pensionist Assembly of the Canaries (TPC)	449	0.11	–0.08	0	±0
National Democracy (DN)	409	0.10	New	0	±0
Centrist Union (UC)	43	0.01	–0.36	0	±0
Blank ballots	5,192	1.27	±0.00		
Total	407,983			15	±0
Valid votes	407,983	99.42	+0.03		
Invalid votes	2,394	0.58	–0.03		
Votes cast / turnout	410,377	67.83	+5.83		
Abstentions	194,622	32.17	–5.83		
Registered voters	604,999				

=== 1999 ===
Summary of the 13 June 1999 Parliament of the Canary Islands election results in Gran Canaria
Parties and alliances	Popular vote			Seats	
Parties and alliances	Votes	%	±pp	Total	+/−
People's Party (PP)	148,328	40.33	+0.15	7	±0
Canarian Coalition (CC)	117,116	31.84	+4.34	5	±0
Spanish Socialist Workers' Party (PSOE)	67,740	18.42	+0.42	3	±0
Canarian Nationalist Federation (FNC)^{1}	11,270	3.06	–0.22	0	±0
Canarian United Left (IUC)	9,657	2.63	–2.60	0	±0
The Greens of the Canaries (Verdes)	5,397	1.47	New	0	±0
Centrist Union–Democratic and Social Centre (UC–CDS)	1,350	0.37	–0.06	0	±0
Nationalist Maga Alternative (AMAGA)	864	0.23	New	0	±0
Humanist Party (PH)	714	0.19	–0.07	0	±0
Pensionist Assembly of the Canaries (TPC)	692	0.19	New	0	±0
Blank ballots	4,672	1.27	+0.17		
Total	367,800			15	±0
Valid votes	367,800	99.39	–0.05		
Invalid votes	2,247	0.61	+0.05		
Votes cast / turnout	370,047	62.00	–4.27		
Abstentions	226,789	38.00	+4.27		
Registered voters	596,836				
Sources
Footnotes: ^{1} Canarian Nationalist Federation results are compared to Nationalist Canarian Platform totals in the 1995 election.

=== 1995 ===
Summary of the 28 May 1995 Parliament of the Canary Islands election results in Gran Canaria
Parties and alliances	Popular vote			Seats	
Parties and alliances	Votes	%	±pp	Total	+/−
People's Party (PP)	145,353	40.18	+23.59	7	+4
Canarian Coalition (CC)^{1}	99,475	27.50	+3.62	5	+2
Spanish Socialist Workers' Party (PSOE)	65,096	18.00	–14.18	3	–2
Canarian United Left (IUC)	18,910	5.23	New	0	±0
Nationalist Canarian Platform (PCN)	11,876	3.28	New	0	±0
Coalition for Gran Canaria (CGC)	10,964	3.03	New	0	±0
Popular Front of the Canary Islands–Awañac (FREPIC–Awañac)	2,436	0.67	+0.22	0	±0
Democratic and Social Centre–Centrist Union (CDS–UC)	1,567	0.43	–23.40	0	–4
Communist Party of the Canarian People (PCPC)	1,138	0.31	New	0	±0
Humanist Platform (PH)^{2}	946	0.26	–0.09	0	±0
Blank ballots	3,964	1.10	+0.35		
Total	361,725			15	±0
Valid votes	361,725	99.44	+0.13		
Invalid votes	2,019	0.56	–0.13		
Votes cast / turnout	363,744	66.27	+3.77		
Abstentions	185,159	33.73	–3.77		
Registered voters	548,903				
Sources
Footnotes: ^{1} Canarian Coalition results are compared to the combined totals of Canarian Initiative, Canarian Independent Groups and Canarian Nationalist Party in the 1991 election.; ^{2} Humanist Platform results are compared to The Greens Ecologist–Humanist List totals in the 1991 election.

=== 1991 ===
Summary of the 26 May 1991 Parliament of the Canary Islands election results in Gran Canaria
Parties and alliances	Popular vote			Seats	
Parties and alliances	Votes	%	±pp	Total	+/−
Spanish Socialist Workers' Party (PSOE)	100,995	32.18	+5.35	5	±0
Democratic and Social Centre (CDS)	74,765	23.83	–1.27	4	±0
Canarian Initiative (ICAN)^{1}	55,784	17.78	–0.56	3	±0
People's Party (PP)^{2}	52,061	16.59	–2.75	3	±0
Canarian Independent Groups–Independents of Gran Canaria (AIC–IGC)	14,517	4.63	+3.01	0	±0
Canarian Nationalist Party (PNC)	4,625	1.47	New	0	±0
The Greens (LV)	2,198	0.70	New	0	±0
Canarian Coalition for Independence (CI (FREPIC–Awañac))	1,401	0.45	New	0	±0
Left Platform (PCE (m–l)–CRPE)	1,093	0.35	New	0	±0
The Greens Ecologist–Humanist List (LVLE–H)^{3}	1,092	0.35	+0.11	0	±0
Insular Group of Gran Canaria (AIGRANC)	962	0.31	New	0	±0
Workers' Socialist Party (PST)	723	0.23	–0.12	0	±0
Assembly (Tagoror)	671	0.21	+0.03	0	±0
Party of The People (LG)	554	0.18	New	0	±0
Blank ballots	2,367	0.75	–0.01		
Total	313,821			15	±0
Valid votes	313,808	99.31	+0.75		
Invalid votes	2,183	0.69	–0.75		
Votes cast / turnout	315,991	62.50	–4.43		
Abstentions	189,628	37.50	+4.43		
Registered voters	505,619				
Sources
Footnotes: ^{1} Canarian Initiative results are compared to the combined totals of Canarian Assembly–Canarian Nationalist Left and United Canarian Left in the 1987 election.; ^{2} People's Party results are compared to the combined totals of People's Alliance and People's Democratic Party–Canarian Centrists in the 1987 election.; ^{3} The Greens Ecologist–Humanist List results are compared to Humanist Platform totals in the 1987 election.

=== 1987 ===
Summary of the 10 June 1987 Parliament of the Canary Islands election results in Gran Canaria
Parties and alliances	Popular vote			Seats	
Parties and alliances	Votes	%	±pp	Total	+/−
Spanish Socialist Workers' Party (PSOE)	80,817	26.83	–12.19	5	–2
Democratic and Social Centre (CDS)	75,579	25.10	+19.84	4	+3
People's Alliance (AP)^{1}	46,118	15.31	–13.01	3	–2
Canarian Assembly–Canarian Nationalist Left (AC–INC)^{2}	30,369	10.08	+0.59	2	+1
United Canarian Left (ICU)^{3}	24,871	8.26	+3.77	1	+1
Centre Canarian Union (UCC)^{4}	15,466	5.14	–3.97	0	–1
People's Democratic Party–Canarian Centrists (PDP–CC)	12,140	4.03	New	0	±0
National Congress of the Canaries (CNC)	4,907	1.63	New	0	±0
Canarian Independent Groups (AIC)	4,871	1.62	New	0	±0
Workers' Socialist Party (PST)	1,053	0.35	–0.25	0	±0
Workers' Party of Spain–Communist Unity (PTE–UC)	987	0.33	New	0	±0
Humanist Platform (PH)	713	0.24	New	0	±0
Assembly (Tagoror)	552	0.18	New	0	±0
Canarian Democratic Union (UDC)	428	0.14	New	0	±0
Blank ballots	2,299	0.76	+0.76		
Total	301,170			15	±0
Valid votes	301,170	98.56	+1.28		
Invalid votes	4,402	1.44	–1.28		
Votes cast / turnout	305,572	66.93	+4.26		
Abstentions	150,986	33.07	–4.26		
Registered voters	456,558				
Sources
Footnotes: ^{1} People's Alliance results are compared to People's Coalition totals in the 1983 election.; ^{2} Canarian Assembly–Canarian Nationalist Left results are compared to Canarian People's Union–Canarian Assembly totals in the 1983 election.; ^{3} United Canarian Left results are compared to Communist Party of the Canaries totals in the 1983 election.; ^{4} Centre Canarian Union results are compared to Canarian Nationalist Convergence totals in the 1983 election.

=== 1983 ===
Summary of the 8 May 1983 Parliament of the Canary Islands election results in Gran Canaria
Parties and alliances	Popular vote			Seats	
Parties and alliances	Votes	%	±pp	Total	+/−
Spanish Socialist Workers' Party (PSOE)	100,663	39.02	n/a	7	n/a
People's Coalition (AP–PDP–UL)	73,059	28.32	n/a	5	n/a
Canarian People's Union–Canarian Assembly (UPC–AC)	24,495	9.49	n/a	1	n/a
Canarian Nationalist Convergence (CNC)	23,512	9.11	n/a	1	n/a
Democratic and Social Centre (CDS)	13,561	5.26	n/a	1	n/a
Communist Party of the Canaries (PCC–PCE)	11,577	4.49	n/a	0	n/a
Party of the Canarian Country (PPC)	7,676	2.98	n/a	0	n/a
Workers' Socialist Party (PST)	1,550	0.60	n/a	0	n/a
Popular Struggle Coalition (CLP)	1,010	0.39	n/a	0	n/a
Revolutionary Communist League (LCR)	907	0.35	n/a	0	n/a
Blank ballots	0	0.00	n/a		
Total	258,010			15	n/a
Valid votes	258,010	97.28	n/a		
Invalid votes	7,207	2.72	n/a		
Votes cast / turnout	265,217	62.67	n/a		
Abstentions	157,970	37.33	n/a		
Registered voters	423,187				

== Bibliography ==
- Government of the Canary Islands (November 1987). Resultados procesos electorales en Canarias. Elecciones Locales: Ayuntamientos y Cabildos (1979-1983-1987). Elecciones Autonómicas: Parlamento de Canarias (1983-1987) (PDF) (in Spanish). Las Palmas de Gran Canaria: Statistics and Documentation Center of the Canary Islands. pp. 203–270. Archived from the original on 2017-04-17.
