= Ángel Víctor Torres =

Spanish politician

The Most Excellent Ángel Víctor Torres
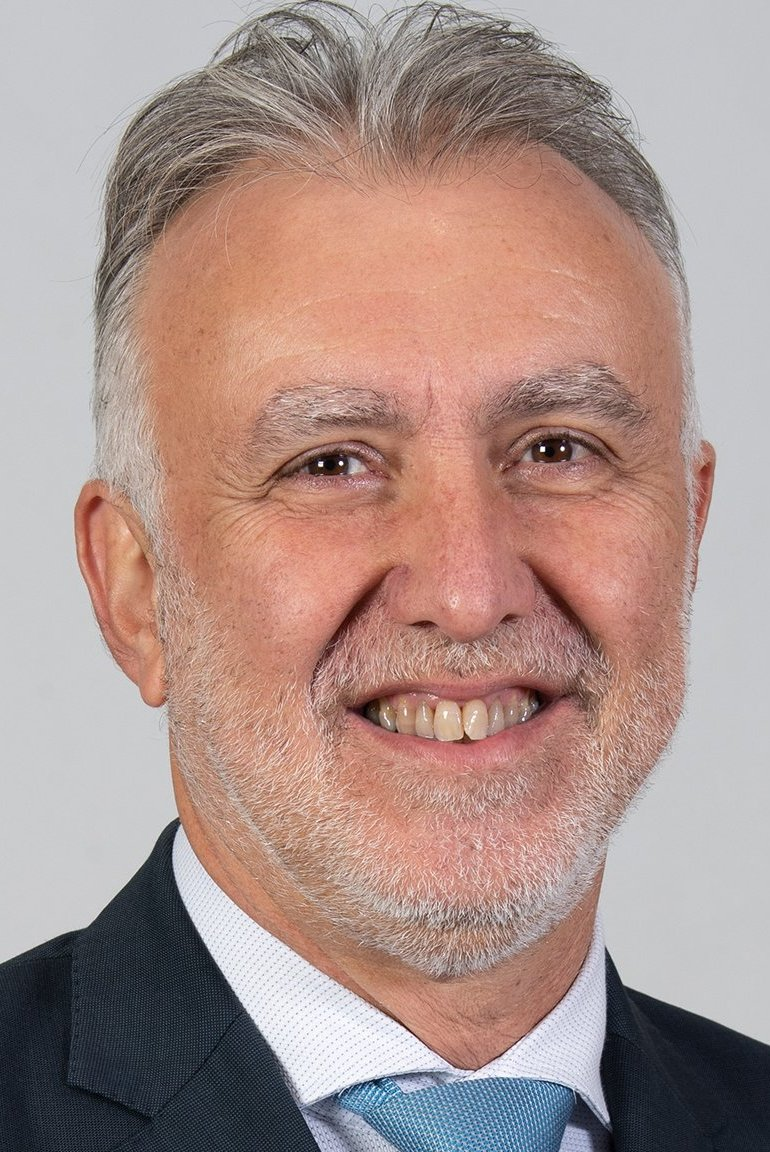
- Official portrait, 2023

Minister for Territorial Policy and Democratic Memory of Spain
- Incumbent
- Assumed office 21 November 2023
- Monarch: Felipe VI
- Prime Minister: Pedro Sánchez
- Preceded by: Isabel Rodríguez García (Territorial Policy); Félix Bolaños (Democratic Memory)

President of the Canary Islands
- In office 16 July 2019 – 12 July 2023
- Monarch: Felipe VI
- Preceded by: Fernando Clavijo
- Succeeded by: Fernando Clavijo

Secretary-General of the Socialist Workers' Party of Canaries
- Incumbent
- Assumed office 16 September 2019
- Preceded by: José Miguel Pérez García

Mayor of Arucas
- In office 14 June 2003 – 16 June 2007
- Preceded by: Luis Hipólito
- Succeeded by: José María Ponce
- In office 11 June 2011 – 13 June 2015
- Preceded by: Juan Francisco Padrón Rodríguez
- Succeeded by: Juan Jesús Facundo

Member of the Congress of Deputies
- In office 23 July 2007 – 27 September 2011
- Constituency: Las Palmas

Member of the Parliament of the Canary Islands
- In office 24 June 2019 – 20 November 2023
- Constituency: Party list

Personal details
- Born: 30 March 1966 (age 60) Arucas, Canary Islands, Spain
- Party: Spanish Socialist Workers' Party
- Occupation: Politician, high school teacher

Ángel Víctor Torres Pérez (Spanish pronunciation: [ˈaŋxel ˈβiɣtoɾ ˈtores ˈpeɾeθ]; born 30 March 1966) is a Spanish politician currently serving as minister for Territorial Policy and Democratic Memory since 2023 and secretary-general of the Socialist Party of the Canaries (PSC–PSOE) since 2019. Before that, he served as president of the Canary Islands from 2019 to 2023.

== Early life and education ==
Born on 30 March 1966, in Arucas, on the island of Gran Canaria, Ángel Víctor Torres obtained a degree in Hispanic Philology at the University of La Laguna. He became a high school professor of language and literature in 1991.

== Career ==
Torres entered politics in 1999 when he became a municipal Councillor in Arucas and was elected to the Spanish Socialist Workers' Party (PSOE) list, served as mayor of the municipality in two spells (2003–2007 and 2011–2015).

From 2009 to 2011, he served as a member of the Congress of Deputies, taking in the vacant seat left by Juan Fernando López Aguilar in 2009, who was later elected to the European Parliament.

He was elected as the secretary-general of the PSC-PSOE in July 2017. Following the results of the 2019 Canarian regional election (in which Torres was elected member of the Parliament of the Canary Islands), Torres (representing the PSC-PSOE) reached a deal with the leaders of the New Canaries, Sí Podemos and Gomera Socialist Group (respectively, Román Rodríguez, Noemí Santana and Casimiro Curbelo) in June 2019 to form a regional government headed by Torres that would oust the government of the Canarian Coalition after a 26-year-long rule of the Canary Islands.

On 21 November 2023, King Felipe VI appointed him as minister of Territorial Policy and Democratic Memory in the third government of Pedro Sánchez.

Political offices
Preceded by Froilán Rodríguez	Mayor of Arucas; 2003-2007	Succeeded by José María Ponce Anguita
Preceded by Juan Francisco Padrón Rodríguez	Mayor of Arucas; 2011-2015	Succeeded by Juan Jesús Facundo
Preceded by Fernando Clavijo	President of the Canary Islands; 2019–2023	Succeeded by Fernando Clavijo
Party political offices
Preceded by José Miguel Pérez García	Secretary-General of the Socialist Workers' Party of Canaries; 2017–present	Succeeded by Incumbent
