= 2019 Canarian regional election =

Election in the Spanish region of the Canary Islands

- 26 May 2019

All 70 seats in the Parliament of the Canary Islands 36 seats needed for a majority
- Opinion polls
- Registered: Island: 1,719,640 ▲3.5% Regional: 1,720,724
- Turnout: Island: 904,369 (52.6%) ▼3.5 pp Regional: 904,093 (52.5%)
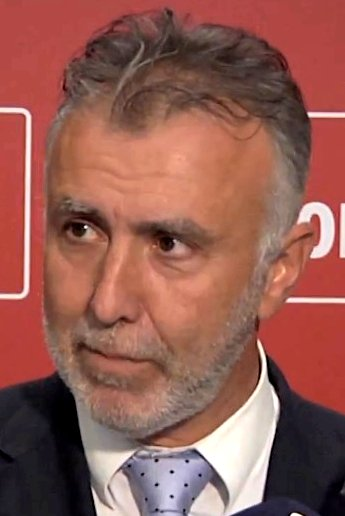

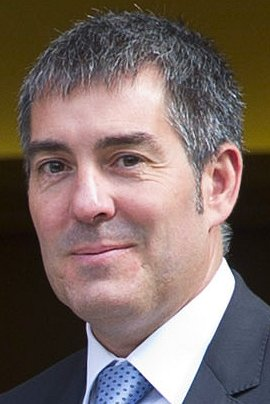

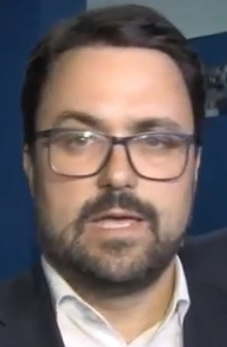

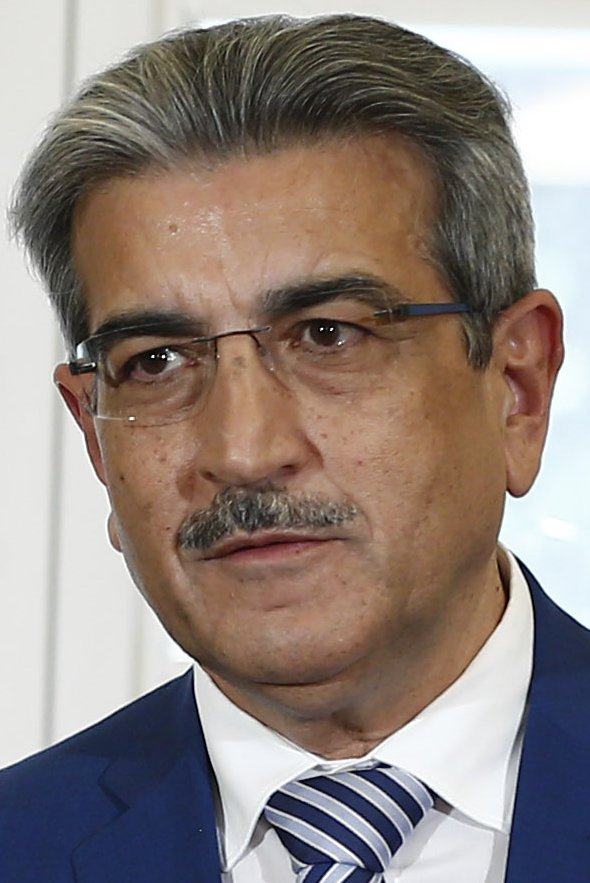

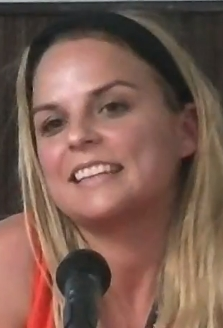

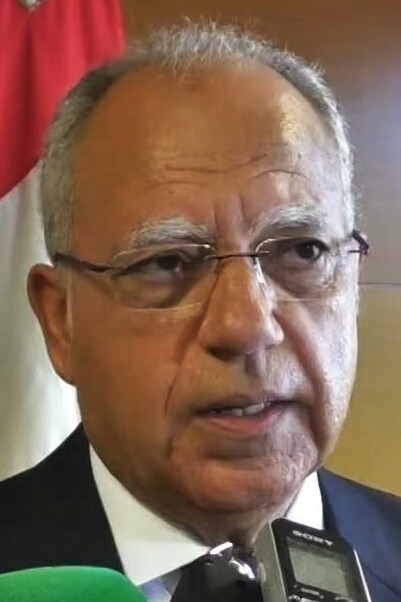

	First party	Second party	Third party
Leader	Ángel Víctor Torres	Fernando Clavijo	Asier Antona
Party	PSOE	CCa–PNC	PP
Leader since	23 July 2017	12 September 2014	22 April 2016
Leader's seat	Regional	Regional	La Palma
Last election	15 seats, 19.9%	18 seats, 21.8% (Note: Results for CCa–PNC (18.2%, 18 seats) and Unidos (3.6%, 0 seats) in the 2015 election.)	12 seats, 18.6%
Seats won	25	20	11
Seat change	▲10	▲2	▼1
Island vote	258,255	196,080	135,722
Island %	28.9%	21.9%	15.2%
Island swing	▲9.0 pp	▲0.1 pp	▼3.4 pp
	Fourth party	Fifth party	Sixth party
Leader	Román Rodríguez	Noemí Santana	Casimiro Curbelo
Party	NCa	Podemos–SSP–Equo	ASG
Leader since	26 February 2005	1 April 2015	6 March 2015
Leader's seat	Regional	Gran Canaria	La Gomera
Last election	5 seats, 10.4% (Note: Results for NCa (10.2%, 5 seats) and AMF (0.2%, 0 seats) in the 2015 election.)	7 seats, 14.5%	3 seats, 0.6%
Seats won	5	4	3
Seat change	0	▼3	0
Island vote	80,891	78,532	6,222
Island %	9.0%	8.8%	0.7%
Island swing	▼1.4 pp	▼5.7 pp	▲0.1 pp
	Seventh party
Leader	Vidina Espino
Party	Cs
Leader since	2 March 2019
Leader's seat	Gran Canaria
Last election	0 seats, 5.9%
Seats won	2
Seat change	▲2
Island vote	65,854
Island %	7.4%
Island swing	▲1.5 pp
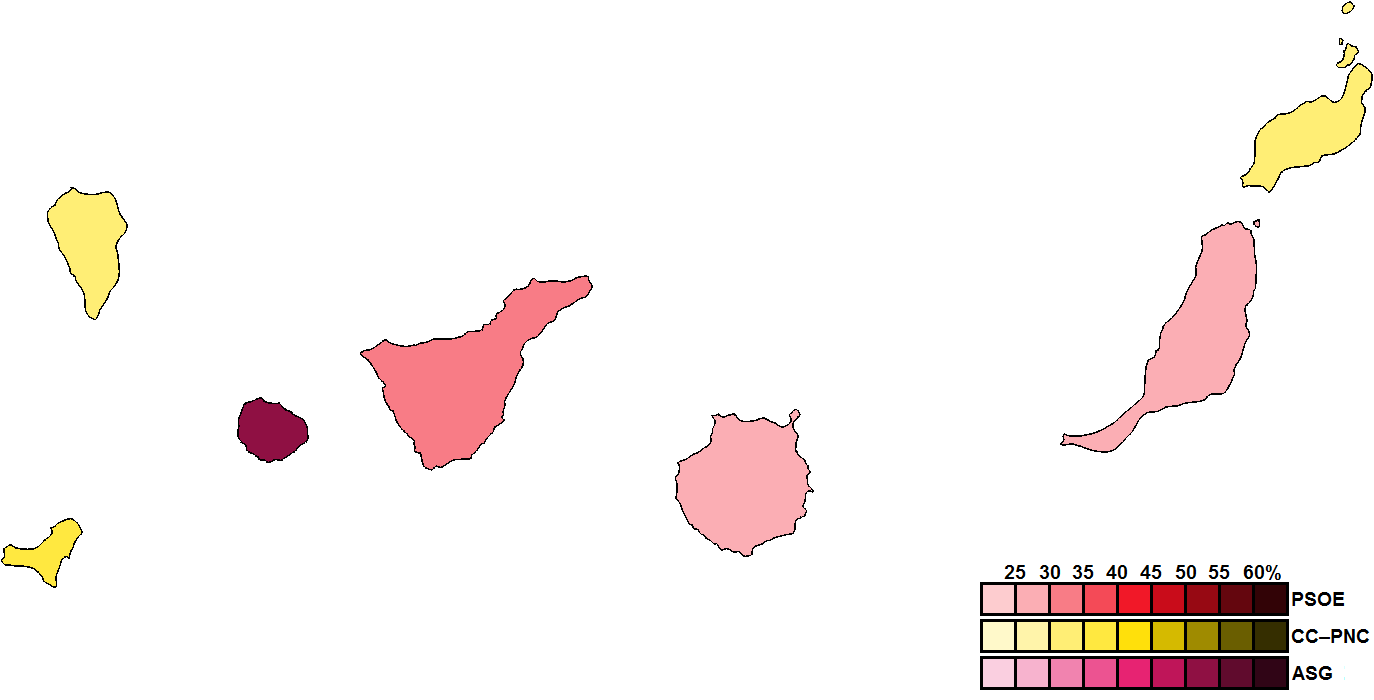
- Constituency results map for the Parliament of the Canary Islands
President before election
Fernando Clavijo
CCa
President after election
Ángel Víctor Torres
PSOE

A regional election was held in the Canary Islands on 26 May 2019 to elect the 10th Parliament of the autonomous community. All 70 seats in the Parliament were up for election. It was held concurrently with regional elections in eleven other autonomous communities and local elections all across Spain, as well as the 2019 European Parliament election.

The election saw the Spanish Socialist Workers' Party (PSOE) under Ángel Víctor Torres becoming the largest force in the islands. Together with New Canaries (NCa), the Yes We Can Canaries alliance led by Podemos and the Gomera Socialist Group (ASG), Torres was able to become regional president, sending Canarian Coalition (CCa) into opposition for the first time since 1993. Support for the People's Party (PP) shrunk, with the party obtaining its worst result since 1991.

== Overview ==
Under the 2018 Statute of Autonomy, the Parliament of the Canary Islands was the unicameral legislature of the homonymous autonomous community, having legislative power in devolved matters, as well as the ability to grant or withdraw confidence from a regional president. The electoral and procedural rules were supplemented by national law provisions.

=== Date ===
The term of the Parliament of the Canary Islands expired four years after the date of its previous ordinary election, with election day being fixed for the fourth Sunday of May every four years. The election decree was required to be issued no later than 54 days before the scheduled election date and published on the following day in the Official Gazette of the Canaries (BOC). The previous election was held on 24 May 2015, setting the date for election day on the fourth Sunday of May four years later, which was 26 May 2019.

Amendments in 2018 granted the regional president the prerogative to dissolve the Parliament of the Canary Islands at any given time and call a snap election, provided that no motion of no confidence was in process and that dissolution did not occur before one year after a previous one. In the event of an investiture process failing to elect a regional president within a two-month period from the Parliament's reconvening, the chamber was to be automatically dissolved and a fresh election called.

The election to the Parliament of the Canary Islands was officially called on 2 April 2019 with the publication of the corresponding decree in the BOC, setting election day for 26 May.

=== Electoral system ===
Voting for the Parliament was based on universal suffrage, comprising all Spanish nationals over 18 years of age, registered in the Canary Islands and with full political rights, provided that they had not been deprived of the right to vote by a final sentence. (Note: Amendments in 2018 granted the right to vote to those legally incapacitated.) Additionally, non-resident citizens were required to apply for voting, a system known as "begged" voting (Spanish: Voto rogado).

The Parliament of the Canary Islands had a minimum of 50 and a maximum of 75 seats, with electoral provisions fixing its size at 70. All were elected in eight multi-member constituencies—corresponding to the islands of El Hierro, Fuerteventura, Gran Canaria, La Gomera, La Palma, Lanzarote and Tenerife, as well as an additional constituency comprising the whole archipelago, each of which was assigned a fixed number of seats—using the D'Hondt method and closed-list proportional voting, with a 15 percent-threshold of valid votes (including blank ballots) in each constituency or four percent regionally.

As a result of the aforementioned allocation, each Parliament constituency was entitled the following seats:

Seats	Constituencies
15	Gran Canaria, Tenerife
9	Regional
8	Fuerteventura^{(+1)}, La Palma, Lanzarote
4	La Gomera
3	El Hierro

The law did not provide for by-elections to fill vacant seats; instead, any vacancies arising after the proclamation of candidates and during the legislative term were filled by the next candidates on the party lists or, when required, by designated substitutes.

=== Outgoing parliament ===
The table below shows the composition of the parliamentary groups in the chamber at the time of the election call.

Parliamentary composition in April 2019
Groups	Parties	Legislators	
Groups	Parties	Seats	Total
Canarian Nationalist Parliamentary Group (CC–PNC)	CCa	16	18
Canarian Nationalist Parliamentary Group (CC–PNC)	AHI	2	18
Canarian Socialist Parliamentary Group	PSOE	15	15
People's Parliamentary Group	PP	12	12
We Can Canaries Parliamentary Group	Podemos	7	7
New Canaries Parliamentary Group (NC)	NCa	5	5
Mixed Parliamentary Group	ASG	3	3

== Parties and candidates ==
The electoral law allowed for parties and federations registered in the interior ministry, alliances and groupings of electors to present lists of candidates. Parties and federations intending to form an alliance were required to inform the relevant electoral commission within 10 days of the election call, whereas groupings of electors needed to secure the signature of at least one percent of the electorate in the constituencies for which they sought election, disallowing electors from signing for more than one list. Additionally, a balanced composition of men and women was required in the electoral lists, so that candidates of either sex made up at least 40 percent of the total composition.

Below is a list of the main parties and alliances which contested the election:

Candidacy	Parties and alliances	Candidate	Ideology	Previous result		Gov.	Ref.
Candidacy	Parties and alliances	Candidate	Ideology	Vote %	Seats	Gov.	Ref.
CCa–PNC	List: Canarian Coalition (CCa); Canarian Nationalist Party (PNC); Independent Herrenian Group (AHI); United for Gran Canaria (UxGC)	Fernando Clavijo	Regionalism; Canarian nationalism Centrism	21.8%	18	Yes	
PSOE	List: Spanish Socialist Workers' Party (PSOE)	Ángel Víctor Torres	Social democracy	19.9%	15	No	
PP	List: People's Party (PP)	Asier Antona	Conservatism; Christian democracy	18.6%	12	No	
Podemos– SSP–Equo	List: We Can (Podemos); Yes We Can (SSP); Equo (Equo)	Noemí Santana	Left-wing populism Direct democracy Democratic socialism	14.5%	7	No	
NCa	List: New Canaries (NCa); Municipal Assemblies of Fuerteventura (AMF)	Román Rodríguez	Canarian nationalism Social democracy	10.4%	5	No	
Cs	List: Citizens–Party of the Citizenry (Cs)	Vidina Espino	Liberalism	5.9%	0	No	
ASG	List: Gomera Socialist Group (ASG)	Casimiro Curbelo	Insularism; Social democracy	0.6%	3	No	
Vox	List: Vox (Vox)	Carmelo González	Right-wing populism Ultranationalism; National conservatism	0.2%	0	No	

== Campaign ==
=== Debates ===
2019 Canarian regional election debates
Date	Organizer(s)	Moderator(s)	P Present (Note: Denotes a main invitee attending the event.) NI Not invited							
Date	Organizer(s)	Moderator(s)	CCa–PNC	PSOE	PP	USP	NCa	Cs	Audience	Ref.
10 May	Cadena SER	Miguel Ángel Rodríguez	P Clavijo	P Torres	P Antona	P Santana	P Rodríguez	P Espino	—	
15 May	RTVC	Roberto González; Pilar Rumeu	P Clavijo	P Torres	P Antona	P Santana	P Rodríguez	NI	6.1% (46,000)	
23 May	RTVE	Nayra Santana	P Clavijo	P Torres	P Antona	P Santana	P Rodríguez	P Espino	N/A	
24 May	COPE	Mayer Trujillo	P Clavijo	P Torres	P Antona	P Santana	P Rodríguez	P Espino	—	

== Opinion polls ==
The tables below list opinion polling results in reverse chronological order, showing the most recent first and using the dates when the survey fieldwork was done, as opposed to the date of publication. Where the fieldwork dates are unknown, the date of publication is given instead. The highest percentage figure in each polling survey is displayed with its background shaded in the leading party's colour. If a tie ensues, this is applied to the figures with the highest percentages. The "Lead" column on the right shows the percentage-point difference between the parties with the highest percentages in a poll.

=== Voting intention estimates ===
The table below lists weighted voting intention estimates. Refusals are generally excluded from the party vote percentages, while question wording and the treatment of "don't know" responses and those not intending to vote may vary between polling organisations. When available, seat projections determined by the polling organisations are displayed below (or in place of) the percentages in a smaller font; 36 seats were required for an absolute majority in the Parliament of the Canary Islands (31 in the 2015 election).

Color key:

Poll conducted after legal ban on opinion polls Exit poll

Polling firm/Commissioner	Fieldwork date	Sample size	Turnout	PSOE	PP	CCa	Sí Podemos Canarias	NCa	Cs	UxGC	IUC	ASG	Vox	Unidas Podemos	Lead
2019 regional election	26 May 2019	—N/a	52.6	28.9; 25	15.2; 11	21.9; 20	8.8; 4	9.0; 5	7.4; 2	(Note: Within CCa.)	1.0; 0	0.7; 3	2.5; 0	–	7.0
GfK/FORTA	26 May 2019	?	?	29.5; 23/26	13.8; 10/12	19.7; 16/18	12.4; 6/7	7.8; 4/5	7.9; 3/4		–	0.7; 2/3	? 0	–	9.8
ElectoPanel/Electomanía	22–23 May 2019	?	?	24.6; 22	13.5; 9	17.5; 15	12.6; 7	11.3; 6	12.9; 8		–	0.4; 3	3.6; 0	–	7.1
ElectoPanel/Electomanía	21–22 May 2019	?	?	24.8; 23	13.6; 9	17.7; 15	12.4; 7	11.2; 6	12.6; 8		–	0.4; 2	3.5; 0	–	7.1
ElectoPanel/Electomanía	20–21 May 2019	?	?	24.9; 23	13.5; 9	17.6; 15	12.5; 7	11.0; 6	12.5; 8		–	0.4; 2	3.6; 0	–	7.3
ElectoPanel/Electomanía	19–20 May 2019	?	?	24.9; 24	13.8; 10	17.7; 15	12.3; 7	10.9; 4	12.6; 8		–	0.4; 2	3.5; 0	–	7.2
NC Report/La Razón	19 May 2019	?	?	26.2; 20/24	13.1; 9/12	? 12/16	? 6/9	? 4/7	? 6/9		–	? 2/3	? 0	–	?
ElectoPanel/Electomanía	16–19 May 2019	?	?	24.7; 23	14.0; 10	17.9; 15	12.1; 7	10.5; 4	12.9; 8		–	0.4; 3	3.5; 0	–	6.8
Hamalgama Métrica/La Provincia	5–17 May 2019	2,400	?	25.3; 19/25	13.9; 8/9	18.3; 14/19	13.5; 6/8	9.9; 4/7	10.6; 4/8		–	0.3; 2/3	4.7; 0/4	–	7.0
ElectoPanel/Electomanía	13–16 May 2019	?	?	24.8; 24	15.1; 11	18.6; 16	11.1; 6	9.7; 4	13.5; 7		–	0.4; 2	3.9; 0	–	6.2
TSA/Canarias7	29 Apr–14 May 2019	2,659	?	25.7; 21/27	11.8; 7/11	16.7; 13/18	13.8; 7/9	11.1; 6/9	10.6; 7		–	0.4; 2/3	3.2; 0	–	9.0
ElectoPanel/Electomanía	10–13 May 2019	?	?	23.7; 23	15.2; 11	18.3; 16	11.2; 6	9.0; 3	14.4; 8		–	0.3; 3	4.0; 0	–	5.4
ElectoPanel/Electomanía	7–10 May 2019	?	?	23.6; 22	14.9; 11	18.7; 16	11.2; 6	8.6; 3	14.7; 9		–	0.4; 3	4.1; 0	–	4.9
ElectoPanel/Electomanía	4–7 May 2019	?	?	24.1; 22	14.7; 10	18.9; 16	10.9; 6	8.5; 3	15.0; 8		–	0.4; 3	4.5; 2	–	5.2
ElectoPanel/Electomanía	29 Apr–4 May 2019	?	?	24.3; 22	14.3; 9	18.3; 16	11.0; 6	8.8; 3	15.3; 9		–	0.4; 3	4.4; 2	–	6.0
April 2019 general election	28 Apr 2019	—N/a	62.5	27.8 (23)	15.5 (13)	13.0 (9)	(Note: Within Unidas Podemos.)	3.4 (0)	14.7 (9)	–		–	6.6 (3)	15.7 (13)	12.1
CIS	21 Mar–23 Apr 2019	924	?	27.8; 20/23	15.9; 9/11	16.5; 12/15	11.6; 6/8	8.2; 4/7	11.9; 6/8		–	? 2/3	3.6; 0/1	–	11.3
ElectoPanel/Electomanía	31 Mar–7 Apr 2019	?	?	22.8; 19	16.3; 13	17.4; 16		13.3; 7	10.0; 5			0.4; 3	6.6; 2	8.9; 5	5.4
ElectoPanel/Electomanía	24–31 Mar 2019	?	?	23.0; 19	15.9; 12	17.3; 16		13.5; 7	10.3; 6			0.4; 3	6.7; 2	8.8; 5	5.7
ElectoPanel/Electomanía	17–24 Mar 2019	?	?	23.2; 20	16.3; 12	17.5; 16		13.4; 7	9.9; 5			0.4; 3	6.6; 2	8.7; 5	5.7
ElectoPanel/Electomanía	10–17 Mar 2019	?	?	22.4; 19	16.7; 13	18.0; 16		13.1; 7	9.0; 4			0.5; 3	7.6; 2	9.0; 6	4.4
ElectoPanel/Electomanía	3–10 Mar 2019	?	?	22.1; 20	16.4; 12	18.0; 16		13.1; 7	9.3; 4			0.5; 3	7.4; 2	9.1; 6	4.1
ElectoPanel/Electomanía	22 Feb–3 Mar 2019	?	?	21.9; 20	16.5; 12	17.9; 16		13.1; 7	9.5; 4			0.5; 3	7.1; 2	9.2; 6	4.0
SyM Consulting	3–6 May 2018	4,400	55.9	22.3; 14/17	7.1; 6/9	14.8; 10/13	12.7; 6/7	11.4; 4/5	18.5; 11/13	3.1; 0	1.6; 0	0.6; 2/3	–	–	3.8
PSOE	29 Apr 2018	?	?	? 10	? 10	? 13	? 8	? 6	? 10	–	–	? 3	–	–	?
TSA/Canarias7	28 Feb–31 Mar 2018	2,995	?	22.6; 16/17	15.3; 7/10	15.8; 12/14	11.9; 6	13.2; 6/7	12.6; 6/7	–	–	0.5; 3	–	–	6.8
Hamalgama Métrica/La Provincia	10–25 Aug 2017	1,980	?	23.8; 18/19	20.2; 11	17.3; 15/16	14.2; 6	9.8; 4	7.0; 2	–	–	? 3	–	–	3.6
2016 general election	26 Jun 2016	—N/a	59.1	22.5 (15)	34.1 (23)	8.0 (5)		(Note: Within PSOE.)	12.0 (6)	–		–	0.1 (0)	20.3 (11)	11.6
2015 general election	20 Dec 2015	—N/a	60.3	22.0 (16)	28.5 (19)	8.2 (6)	23.3 (12)		11.4 (7)	–	3.1 (0)	–	0.2 (0)	–	6.5
2015 regional election	24 May 2015	—N/a	56.1	19.9; 15	18.6; 12	18.2; 18	14.5; 7	10.2; 5	5.9; 0	3.6; 0	2.2; 0	0.6; 3	0.2; 0	–	1.3

=== Voting preferences ===
The table below lists raw, unweighted voting preferences.

Polling firm/Commissioner	Fieldwork date	Sample size	PSOE	PP	CCa	Sí Podemos Canarias	NCa	Cs	IUC	ASG	Vox	Unidas Podemos	Question	X mark	Lead
2019 regional election (Note: Does not include non-resident citizens.)	26 May 2019	—N/a	16.4	8.6	12.4	5.0	5.1	4.2	0.6	0.4	1.4	–	—N/a	42.6	4.0
CIS	21 Mar–23 Apr 2019	924	18.4	10.1	10.0	4.4	3.1	5.1	–	–	2.1	–	37.2	6.7	8.3
2016 general election	26 Jun 2016	—N/a	14.3	21.7	5.1			7.6		–	0.1	12.9	—N/a	35.6	7.4
2015 general election	20 Dec 2015	—N/a	14.3	18.5	5.3	15.1		7.4	2.0	–	0.1	–	—N/a	34.3	3.4
2015 regional election	24 May 2015	—N/a	11.9	11.1	10.9	8.7	6.1	3.6	1.3	0.3	0.1	–	—N/a	39.0	0.8

== Results ==
=== Overall ===
← Summary of the 26 May 2019 Parliament of the Canary Islands election results →
Parties and alliances	Island constituencies			Regional constituency			Seats	
Parties and alliances	Votes	%	±pp	Votes	%	±pp	Total	+/−
Spanish Socialist Workers' Party (PSOE)	258,255	28.88	+8.99	264,221	29.53	n/a	25	+10
Canarian Coalition–Canarian Nationalist Party (CCa–PNC)^{1}	196,080	21.93	+0.09	209,150	23.37	n/a	20	+2
People's Party (PP)	135,722	15.18	−3.41	130,617	14.60	n/a	11	−1
New Canaries (NCa)^{2}	80,891	9.05	−1.34	82,980	9.27	n/a	5	±0
Yes We Can Canaries (Podemos–SSP–Equo)^{3}	78,532	8.78	−5.76	76,433	8.54	n/a	4	−3
Citizens–Party of the Citizenry (Cs)	65,854	7.36	+1.42	62,115	6.94	n/a	2	+2
Vox (Vox)	22,078	2.47	+2.27	22,178	2.48	n/a	0	±0
Animalist Party Against Mistreatment of Animals (PACMA)	10,029	1.12	−0.11	12,166	1.36	n/a	0	±0
Canarian United Left (IUC)^{4}	9,115	1.02	−1.18	8,598	0.96	n/a	0	±0
Gomera Socialist Group (ASG)	6,222	0.70	+0.14	—	—	—	3	±0
The Greens–Green Group (LV–GV)	5,058	0.57	New	6,263	0.70	New	0	±0
Canaries Now (ANC–UP)^{5}	2,515	0.28	−0.34	3,163	0.35	n/a	0	±0
More for Telde (+xT)	1,985	0.22	−0.15	—	—	—	0	±0
Tenerife Socialist Group (ASTf)	1,512	0.17	New	—	—	—	0	±0
Santa Cruz Common Sense (SCSC)	1,379	0.15	New	—	—	—	0	±0
Nivaria (Nivaria)	1,153	0.13	New	—	—	—	0	±0
Communist Party of the Canarian People (PCPC)	989	0.11	−0.09	1,200	0.13	n/a	0	±0
With You, We Are Democracy (Contigo)	970	0.11	New	794	0.09	New	0	±0
Fuerteventura Party (PF)	954	0.11	New	—	—	—	0	±0
Seniors in Action (3e en acción)	911	0.10	New	—	—	—	0	±0
United for Lanzarote (UPLanzarote)	657	0.07	New	—	—	—	0	±0
For a Fairer World (PUM+J)	575	0.06	−0.14	979	0.11	n/a	0	±0
Democratic Union of the Canary Islands (UDC)	522	0.06	New	1,248	0.14	New	0	±0
Let's Vote Fuerteventura (Votemos)	387	0.04	New	—	—	—	0	±0
Humanist Party (PH)	337	0.04	New	—	—	—	0	±0
Canaries for Progress (Ci–Progreso)	263	0.03	New	—	—	—	0	±0
Federation Free Socialist Party (PSLF)	224	0.03	New	—	—	—	0	±0
Movement for the Unity of the Canarian People (MUPC)	n/a	n/a	−0.19	782	0.09	n/a	0	±0
Union of Independent Citizens (UCIN)	—	—	—	450	0.05	New	0	±0
Libertarian Party (P–LIB)	—	—	—	436	0.05	New	0	±0
Blank ballots	11,111	1.24	−0.59	11,089	1.24	n/a		
Total	894,280			894,862			70	+10
Valid votes	894,280	98.88	+0.68	894,862	98.98	n/a		
Invalid votes	10,089	1.12	−0.68	9,231	1.02	n/a		
Votes cast / turnout	904,369	52.59	−3.50	904,093	52.54	n/a		
Abstentions	815,271	47.41	+3.50	816,631	47.46	n/a		
Registered voters	1,719,640			1,720,724				
Sources
Footnotes: ^{1} Canarian Coalition–Canarian Nationalist Party results are compared to the combined totals of Canarian Coalition–Canarian Nationalist Party and United in the 2015 election.; ^{2} New Canaries results are compared to the combined totals of New Canaries and Municipal Assemblies of Fuerteventura in the 2015 election.; ^{3} Yes We Can Canaries results are compared to We Can totals in the 2015 election.; ^{4} Canarian United Left results are compared to Canaries Decides totals in the 2015 election.; ^{5} Canaries Now results are compared to Canarian Nationalist Alternative totals in the 2015 election.

Popular vote (island constituencies)
PSOE	28.88%
CCa–PNC	21.93%
PP	15.18%
NCa	9.05%
SPC	8.78%
Cs	7.36%
Vox	2.47%
PACMA	1.12%
IUC	1.02%
ASG	0.70%
Others	2.28%
Blank ballots	1.24%

Popular vote (regional constituency)
PSOE	29.53%
CCa–PNC	23.37%
PP	14.60%
NCa	9.27%
SPC	8.54%
Cs	6.94%
Vox	2.48%
PACMA	1.36%
Others	2.67%
Blank ballots	1.24%

Seats
PSOE	35.71%
CCa–PNC	28.57%
PP	15.71%
NCa	7.04%
SPC	5.71%
ASG	4.29%
Cs	2.86%

=== Distribution by constituency ===
Constituency	PSOE		CC–PNC		PP		NCa		SPC		Cs		ASG	
Constituency	%	S	%	S	%	S	%	S	%	S	%	S	%	S
El Hierro	31.5	1	35.4	1	18.2	1	5.0	−			3.7	−		
Fuerteventura	26.0	3	25.1	3	13.8	1	11.2	1	7.0	−	5.7	−		
Gran Canaria	28.3	5	11.7	2	16.5	3	17.7	3	8.9	1	8.9	1		
La Gomera	20.7	1	9.1	−	4.4	−	4.0	−	6.6	−	1.7	−	52.1	3
La Palma	27.2	3	30.9	3	25.0	2	3.7	−	4.2	−	3.2	−		
Lanzarote	28.4	3	32.0	3	12.7	1	5.3	−	8.1	1	5.6	−		
Tenerife	30.2	6	29.2	5	13.5	2	2.0	−	9.6	1	7.0	1		
Regional	29.5	3	23.4	3	14.6	1	9.3	1	8.5	1	6.9	−		
Total	28.9	25	21.9	20	15.2	11	9.0	5	8.8	4	7.4	2	0.7	3

== Aftermath ==
=== Government formation ===
Investiture; Nomination of Ángel Víctor Torres (PSOE)
Ballot →	12 July 2019
Required majority →	36 out of 70
Yes: • PSOE (25); • NCa (5); • Podemos–SSP–Equo (4); • ASG (3)	37 / 70
No: • CCa–PNC (19); • PP (10); • Cs (2)	31 / 70
Abstentions	0 / 70
Absentees: • CCa–PNC (1); • PP (1)	2 / 70

== Bibliography ==
- Ley Orgánica 5/1985, de 19 de junio, del Régimen Electoral General (Organic Law 5/1985). Official State Gazette (in Spanish). 19 June 1985 [version as of 6 March 2019]. BOE-A-1985-11672.
- Ley 7/2003, de 20 de marzo, de Elecciones al Parlamento de Canarias (Law 7/2003). Official State Gazette (in Spanish). 20 March 2003 [version as of 20 April 2007]. BOE-A-2003-7685.
- Ley Orgánica 1/2018, de 5 de noviembre, de reforma del Estatuto de Autonomía de Canarias (Organic Law 1/2018). Official State Gazette (in Spanish). 5 November 2018 [version as of 28 December 2022]. BOE-A-2018-15138.
- Decreto 37/2019, de 1 de abril, del Presidente, por el que se convocan elecciones al Parlamento de Canarias (Decree 37/2019). Official Gazette of the Canaries (in Spanish). 1 April 2019. BOC-A-2019-064-1543.
