= 2015 Canarian regional election =

Election in the Spanish region of the Canary Islands

- 24 May 2015

All 60 seats in the Parliament of the Canary Islands 31 seats needed for a majority
- Opinion polls
- Registered: 1,661,494 ▲5.1%
- Turnout: 931,876 (56.1%) ▼2.8 pp
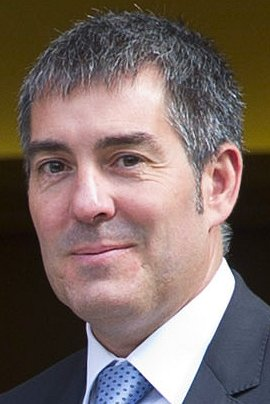

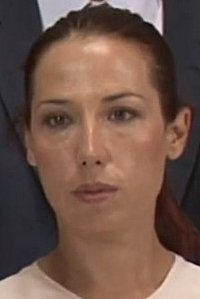

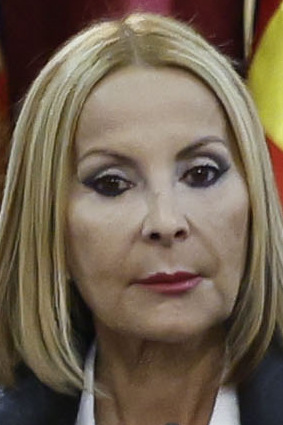

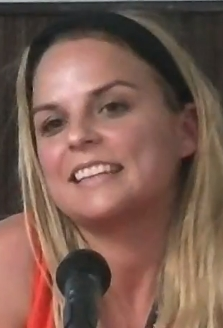

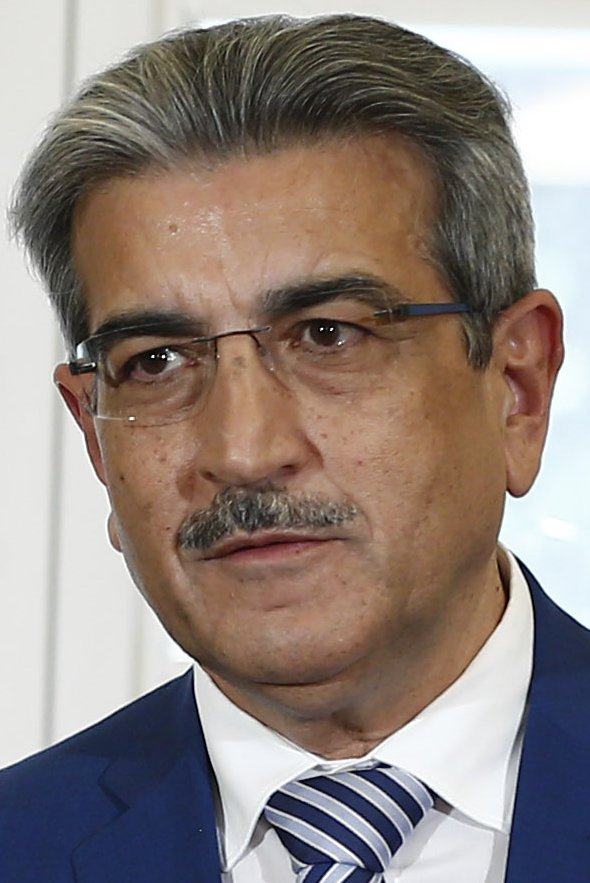

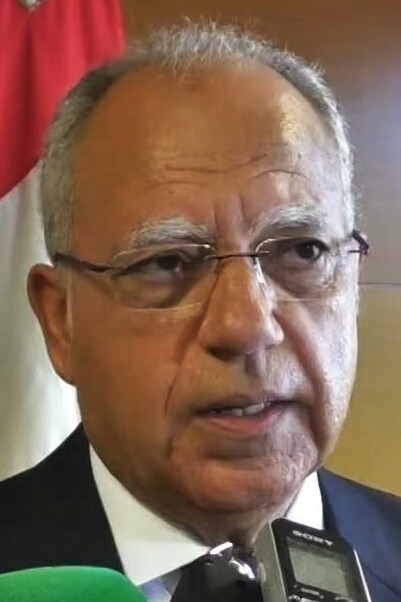
	First party	Second party	Third party
Leader	Fernando Clavijo	Patricia Hernández	Australia Navarro
Party	CCa–PNC	PSOE	PP
Leader since	12 September 2014	19 October 2014	6 March 2015
Leader's seat	Tenerife	Tenerife	Gran Canaria
Last election	21 seats, 24.9%	15 seats, 21.0%	21 seats, 31.9%
Seats won	18	15	12
Seat change	▼3	0	▼9
Popular vote	166,979	182,006	170,129
Percentage	18.2%	19.9%	18.6%
Swing	▼6.7 pp	▼1.1 pp	▼13.3 pp
	Fourth party	Fifth party	Sixth party
Leader	Noemí Santana	Román Rodríguez	Casimiro Curbelo
Party	Podemos	NCa	ASG
Leader since	1 April 2015	26 February 2005	6 March 2015
Leader's seat	Gran Canaria	Gran Canaria	La Gomera
Last election	Did not contest	2 seats, 8.4%	Did not contest
Seats won	7	5	3
Seat change	▲7	▲3	▲3
Popular vote	133,044	93,634	5,090
Percentage	14.5%	10.2%	0.6%
Swing	New party	▲1.8 pp	New party
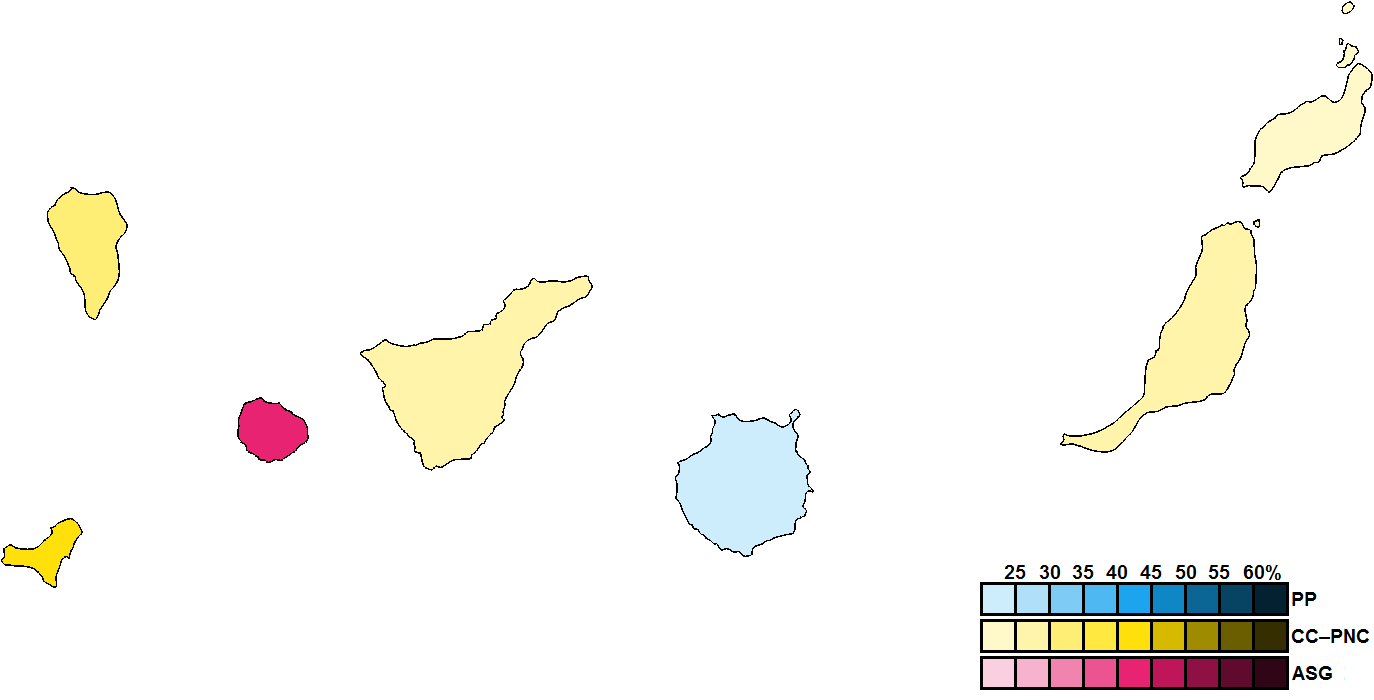
- Constituency results map for the Parliament of the Canary Islands
President before election
Paulino Rivero
CCa
President after election
Fernando Clavijo
CCa

A regional election was held in the Canary Islands on 24 May 2015 to elect the 9th Parliament of the autonomous community. All 60 seats in the Parliament were up for election. It was held concurrently with regional elections in twelve other autonomous communities and local elections all across Spain.

== Overview ==
Under the 1982 Statute of Autonomy, the Parliament of the Canary Islands was the unicameral legislature of the homonymous autonomous community, having legislative power in devolved matters, as well as the ability to grant or withdraw confidence from a regional president. The electoral and procedural rules were supplemented by national law provisions.

=== Date ===
The term of the Parliament of the Canary Islands expired four years after the date of its previous ordinary election, with election day being fixed for the fourth Sunday of May every four years. The election decree was required to be issued no later than 54 days before the scheduled election date and published on the following day in the Official Gazette of the Canaries (BOC). The previous election was held on 22 May 2011, setting the date for election day on the fourth Sunday of May four years later, which was 24 May 2015.

The Parliament of the Canary Islands could not be dissolved before the expiration date of parliament, except in the event of an investiture process failing to elect a regional president within a two-month period from the first ballot. In such a case, the Parliament was to be automatically dissolved and a snap election called, with elected lawmakers serving the remainder of its original four-year term.

The election to the Parliament of the Canary Islands was officially called on 31 March 2015 with the publication of the corresponding decree in the BOC, setting election day for 24 May.

=== Electoral system ===
Voting for the Parliament was based on universal suffrage, comprising all Spanish nationals over 18 years of age, registered in the Canary Islands and with full political rights, provided that they had not been deprived of the right to vote by a final sentence, nor were legally incapacitated. Additionally, non-resident citizens were required to apply for voting, a system known as "begged" voting (Spanish: Voto rogado).

The Parliament of the Canary Islands had a minimum of 50 and a maximum of 70 seats, with electoral provisions fixing its size at 60. All were elected in seven multi-member constituencies—corresponding to the islands of El Hierro, Fuerteventura, Gran Canaria, La Gomera, La Palma, Lanzarote and Tenerife, each of which was assigned a fixed number of seats—using the D'Hondt method and closed-list proportional voting, with a 30 percent-threshold of valid votes (including blank ballots) in each constituency or six percent regionally.

As a result of the aforementioned allocation, each Parliament constituency was entitled the following seats:

Seats	Constituencies
15	Gran Canaria, Tenerife
8	La Palma, Lanzarote
7	Fuerteventura
4	La Gomera
3	El Hierro

The law did not provide for by-elections to fill vacant seats; instead, any vacancies arising after the proclamation of candidates and during the legislative term were filled by the next candidates on the party lists or, when required, by designated substitutes.

=== Outgoing parliament ===
The table below shows the composition of the parliamentary groups in the chamber at the time of the election call.

Parliamentary composition in March 2015
Groups	Parties	Legislators	
Groups	Parties	Seats	Total
People's Parliamentary Group	PP	21	21
Canarian Nationalist Parliamentary Group (CC–PNC–CCN)	CCa	18	21
Canarian Nationalist Parliamentary Group (CC–PNC–CCN)	CCN	2	21
Canarian Nationalist Parliamentary Group (CC–PNC–CCN)	AHI	1	21
Canarian Socialist Parliamentary Group	PSOE	15	15
Mixed Parliamentary Group	NCa	2	3
Mixed Parliamentary Group	PIL	1	3

== Parties and candidates ==
The electoral law allowed for parties and federations registered in the interior ministry, alliances and groupings of electors to present lists of candidates. Parties and federations intending to form an alliance were required to inform the relevant electoral commission within 10 days of the election call, whereas groupings of electors needed to secure the signature of at least one percent of the electorate in the constituencies for which they sought election, disallowing electors from signing for more than one list. Additionally, a balanced composition of men and women was required in the electoral lists, so that candidates of either sex made up at least 40 percent of the total composition.

Below is a list of the main parties and alliances which contested the election:

Candidacy	Parties and alliances	Candidate	Ideology	Previous result		Gov.	Ref.
Candidacy	Parties and alliances	Candidate	Ideology	Vote %	Seats	Gov.	Ref.
PP	List: People's Party (PP)	Australia Navarro	Conservatism; Christian democracy	31.9%	21	No	
CCa–PNC	List: Canarian Coalition (CCa); Canarian Nationalist Party (PNC); Independent Herrenian Group (AHI)	Fernando Clavijo	Regionalism; Canarian nationalism Centrism	24.9%	21	Yes	
PSOE	List: Spanish Socialist Workers' Party (PSOE)	Patricia Hernández	Social democracy	21.0%	15	Yes	
NCa	List: New Canaries (NCa); Independents of Fuerteventura (IF); For Tenerife (XTF); Gomeran Democratic Alternative (ADGomera)	Román Rodríguez	Canarian nationalism Social democracy	9.1%	3	No	
Podemos	List: We Can (Podemos)	Noemí Santana	Left-wing populism Direct democracy Democratic socialism	Did not contest		No	
C's	List: Citizens–Party of the Citizenry (C's)	Melisa Rodríguez	Liberalism	Did not contest		No	
ASG	List: Gomera Socialist Group (ASG)	Casimiro Curbelo	Insularism; Social democracy	Did not contest		No	

== Opinion polls ==
The tables below list opinion polling results in reverse chronological order, showing the most recent first and using the dates when the survey fieldwork was done, as opposed to the date of publication. Where the fieldwork dates are unknown, the date of publication is given instead. The highest percentage figure in each polling survey is displayed with its background shaded in the leading party's colour. If a tie ensues, this is applied to the figures with the highest percentages. The "Lead" column on the right shows the percentage-point difference between the parties with the highest percentages in a poll.

=== Voting intention estimates ===
The table below lists weighted voting intention estimates. Refusals are generally excluded from the party vote percentages, while question wording and the treatment of "don't know" responses and those not intending to vote may vary between polling organisations. When available, seat projections determined by the polling organisations are displayed below (or in place of) the percentages in a smaller font; 31 seats were required for an absolute majority in the Parliament of the Canary Islands.

Polling firm/Commissioner	Fieldwork date	Sample size	Turnout	PP	CCa	PSOE	NCa	SSP	LV	UPyD	IUC	PPM	Podemos	C's	ASG	U	Lead
2015 regional election	24 May 2015	—N/a	56.1	18.6; 12	18.2; 18	19.9; 15	10.2; 5	–	(Note: Within IUC.)	0.9; 0	2.2; 0	(Note: Within Unidos.)	14.5; 7	5.9; 0	0.6; 3	3.6; 0	1.3
NC Report/La Razón	17 May 2015	1,150	?	20.9; 12/13	19.2; 14/16	17.8; 12/13	8.9; 4/5	–	–	–	–		12.5; 8/9	9.2; 5/6	? 1/2	–	1.7
Hamalgama Métrica/La Opinión (Note: "Estimación del voto al Parlamento de Canarias". La Opinión de Tenerife (in Spanish). 18 May 2015.)	?–16 May 2015	?	61.9	18.7; 11/14	19.4; 15/18	18.4; 13/14	8.7; 4	–	–	–	–		14.1; 6/8	8.6; 3/6	0.3; 1/2	–	0.7
Perfiles/Diario de Avisos	4–14 May 2015	3,000	?	20.0– 21.0; 11/14	20.0– 21.0; 16/19	18.0– 19.0; 13/16	9.0– 10.0; 3/5	–	–	–	–		9.0– 10.0; 5/6	9.0– 10.0; 3/7	0.0– 1.0; 2/3	4.0– 5.0; 0	Tie
Focus Investigación	20 Apr 2015	6,840	?	20.5; 12/14	23.6; 17/22	19.3; 13/15	7.4; 3/5	–		–	4.7		12.1; 6/8	7.0; 2	–	–	3.1
Perfiles/Diario de Avisos	7–20 Apr 2015	3,000	?	19.0– 20.0; 13/15	18.0– 19.0; 17	18.0– 19.0; 13/15	7.0– 8.0; 3/5	–	–	–	–		10.0– 11.0; 6	10.0– 11.0; 5/7	0.0– 1.0; 0/1	4.0– 5.0; 0	1.0
CIS	23 Mar–19 Apr 2015	1,723	?	20.8; 12/14	18.9; 17	20.4; 15/16	5.2; 0	–	–	0.7; 0	4.1; 0		15.8; 10	10.7; 4/5	–	–	0.4
TSA/Canarias7	26 Mar–9 Apr 2015	2,779	?	19.7; 11/14	18.9; 14/17	18.4; 11/14	11.9; 5/7	–	–	–	–		11.1; 5/6	9.3; 5/6	0.5; 1	4.1; 0	0.8
NC Report/La Razón	23 Mar–9 Apr 2015	1,150	?	22.2; 13/14	20.2; 15/17	18.2; 12/13	8.9; 5/6	–	–	–	–		11.8; 7/8	7.1; 4/5	? 1/2	–	2.0
Hamalgama Métrica/La Provincia	10–28 Nov 2014	2,400	62.4	24.2; 14	21.2; 16/18	18.8; 10/11	8.6; 4/6	(Note: Within Podemos.)	2.3; 0	1.6; 0	2.5; 0	0.5; 0	18.4; 9/11	–	0.6; 2	–	3.0
Hamalgama Métrica/La Provincia	10–28 Nov 2014	2,400	62.4	24.2; 14/15	21.2; 17/19	18.8; 11/12	8.6; 4/6	2.6; 0	2.3; 0	1.6; 0	2.5; 0	0.5; 0	15.8; 8/9	–	0.6; 2	–	3.0
Hamalgama Métrica/La Provincia	10–28 Nov 2014	2,400	62.4	24.2; 14/15	21.2; 17/19	19.4; 13/14	8.6; 4/6	2.6; 0	2.3; 0	1.6; 0	2.5; 0	0.5; 0	15.8; 8/9	–	–	–	3.0
Llorente & Cuenca	31 Oct 2014	?	?	? 17/19	? 17/22	? 12/14	? 4/5	–	–	? 2	–	–	? 2/4	–	–	–	?
Celeste-Tel/Diario de Avisos	4–14 Aug 2014	2,800	60.9	23.8; 15	21.1; 18	18.0; 14	10.3; 6	–	–	1.2; 0	2.2; 0	–	13.2; 7	–	–	–	2.7
2014 EP election	25 May 2014	—N/a	35.0	23.4 (18)	12.2 (10)	22.2 (19)	–	–		6.9 (2)	10.5 (6)	–	11.0 (5)	1.4 (0)	–	–	1.2
Celeste-Tel/Diario de Avisos	5–16 Apr 2014	3,200	?	24.9; 16	24.3; 21	20.9; 17	13.0; 6	3.9; 0	3.0; 0	3.1; 0	4.1; 0	0.5; 0	–	–	–	–	0.6
Focus Investigación/CC	7 Dec 2013	3,200	?	20.5; 14	22.4; 19	20.0; 17	? 4	–	–	–	11.3; 6	–	–	–	–	–	1.9
Hamalgama Métrica/La Provincia	25 Nov–5 Dec 2013	1,600	55.0	29.0; 20	23.2; 20	19.5; 14/15	11.4; 5/6	2.2; 0	2.1; 0	2.7; 0	3.7; 0	0.5; 0	–	–	–	–	5.8
Demométrica/PSOE	21 Nov–4 Dec 2013	2,500	?	23.3; 13	24.9; 21	22.7; 17	10.0; 6	–	–	–	6.3; 3	–	–	–	–	–	1.6
NC Report/La Razón	15 Oct–12 Nov 2013	?	?	? 17/18	? 23/25	? 14/15	? 3/4	–	–	–	? 1/2	–	–	–	–	–	?
NC Report/La Razón	15 Apr–10 May 2013	300	?	27.6; 18/19	26.7; 22/24	19.7; 14/15	? 3/4	–	–	–	? 1/2	–	–	–	–	–	0.9
2011 general election	20 Nov 2011	—N/a	59.6	48.0 (33)	15.5 (9)	24.9 (18)	(Note: Within CC.)	–		2.6 (0)	4.3 (0)	–	–	–	–	–	23.1
2011 regional election	22 May 2011	—N/a	58.9	31.9; 21	24.9; 21	21.0; 15	9.1; 3	2.1; 0	2.1; 0	1.0; 0	0.8; 0	0.5; 0	–	–	–	–	7.0

=== Voting preferences ===
The table below lists raw, unweighted voting preferences.

Polling firm/Commissioner	Fieldwork date	Sample size	PP	CCa	PSOE	NCa	UPyD	IUC	Podemos	C's	ASG	Question	X mark	Lead
2015 regional election (Note: Does not include non-resident citizens.)	24 May 2015	—N/a	11.1	10.9	11.9	6.1	0.5	1.3	8.7	3.6	0.4	—N/a	39.0	0.8
CIS	23 Mar–19 Apr 2015	1,723	10.1	9.1	11.5	1.9	0.4	1.9	8.9	5.6	–	40.6	7.1	1.6
2014 EP election	25 May 2014	—N/a	8.7	4.5	8.2	–	2.6	3.9	4.1	0.5	–	—N/a	62.2	0.5
2011 general election	20 Nov 2011	—N/a	30.1	9.7	15.6		1.7	2.7	–	–	–	—N/a	36.3	14.5
2011 regional election	22 May 2011	—N/a	19.6	15.3	12.9	5.6	0.6	0.5	0.3	–	–	—N/a	36.8	4.3

=== Victory preferences ===
The table below lists opinion polling on the victory preferences for each party in the event of a regional election taking place.

Polling firm/Commissioner	Fieldwork date	Sample size	PP	CCa	PSOE	NCa	UPyD	IUC	Podemos	C's	Other/ None	Question	Lead
CIS	23 Mar–19 Apr 2015	1,723	13.0	11.3	16.1	2.0	0.5	2.8	9.4	6.4	6.8	31.7	3.1

=== Victory likelihood ===
The table below lists opinion polling on the perceived likelihood of victory for each party in the event of a regional election taking place.

Polling firm/Commissioner	Fieldwork date	Sample size	PP	CCa	PSOE	NCa	IUC	Podemos	C's	Other/ None	Question	Lead
CIS	23 Mar–19 Apr 2015	1,723	18.3	25.2	13.8	0.9	0.3	3.7	0.8	2.2	34.7	6.9

=== Preferred President ===
The table below lists opinion polling on leader preferences to become president of the Canary Islands.

Polling firm/Commissioner	Fieldwork date	Sample size									Other/ None/ Not care	Question	Lead
Polling firm/Commissioner	Fieldwork date	Sample size	Navarro PP	Clavijo CC	Hernández PSOE	Rodríguez NCa	Trujillo IUC	Santana Podemos	Rodríguez C's	Curbelo ASG	Other/ None/ Not care	Question	Lead
Perfiles/Diario de Avisos	4–14 May 2015	3,000	7.5	11.8	7.2	7.7	–	6.0	3.9	0.4	55.5		4.1
Perfiles/Diario de Avisos	7–20 Apr 2015	3,000	5.3	11.1	9.5	6.6	–	5.6	3.2	0.2	4.9	53.6	1.6
CIS (Note: Responses denoting a party's generic candidate are aggregated to that party's main candidate/leader at the time of the poll.)	23 Mar–19 Apr 2015	1,723	4.3	11.5	8.8	5.6	1.7	0.6	1.0	–	4.3	62.3	2.7

== Results ==
=== Overall ===
← Summary of the 24 May 2015 Parliament of the Canary Islands election results →
Parties and alliances	Popular vote			Seats	
Parties and alliances	Votes	%	±pp	Total	+/−
Spanish Socialist Workers' Party (PSOE)	182,006	19.89	−1.09	15	±0
People's Party (PP)	170,129	18.59	−13.35	12	−9
Canarian Coalition–Canarian Nationalist Party (CCa–PNC)	166,979	18.25	−6.69	18	−3
We Can (Podemos)	133,044	14.54	New	7	+7
New Canaries (NCa)	93,634	10.23	+1.81	5	+3
Citizens–Party of the Citizenry (C's)	54,375	5.94	New	0	±0
United (Unidos)^{1}	32,868	3.59	+1.66	0	−1
Canaries Decides (IUC–LV–UP–ALTER)^{2}	20,155	2.20	−0.76	0	±0
Animalist Party Against Mistreatment of Animals (PACMA)	11,296	1.23	+0.93	0	±0
Union, Progress and Democracy (UPyD)	7,819	0.85	−0.15	0	±0
Canarian Nationalist Alternative (ANC)	5,635	0.62	−0.12	0	±0
Gomera Socialist Group (ASG)	5,090	0.56	New	3	+3
More for Telde (+xT)	3,390	0.37	New	0	±0
Communist Party of the Canarian People (PCPC)	1,861	0.20	−0.06	0	±0
For a Fairer World (PUM+J)	1,827	0.20	+0.04	0	±0
Vox (Vox)	1,814	0.20	New	0	±0
Movement for the Unity of the Canarian People (MUPC)	1,777	0.19	+0.05	0	±0
Zero Cuts (Recortes Cero)	1,498	0.16	New	0	±0
Municipal Assemblies of Fuerteventura (AMF)	1,447	0.16	New	0	±0
Blank Seats (EB)	1,363	0.15	New	0	±0
Internationalist Solidarity and Self-Management (SAIn)	330	0.04	New	0	±0
Blank ballots	16,769	1.83	−0.93		
Total	915,106			60	±0
Valid votes	915,106	98.20	+0.89		
Invalid votes	16,770	1.80	−0.89		
Votes cast / turnout	931,876	56.09	−2.81		
Abstentions	729,618	43.91	+2.81		
Registered voters	1,661,494				
Sources
Footnotes: ^{1} United results are compared to the combined totals of Commitment to Gran Canaria, Lanzarote Independents–New Canaries–Nationalist Party and Majorero Progressive Party in the 2011 election.; ^{2} Canaries Decides results are compared to the combined totals of The Greens, Canarian United Left and Unity of the People in the 2011 election.

Popular vote
PSOE	19.89%
PP	18.59%
CCa–PNC	18.25%
Podemos	14.54%
NCa	10.23%
C's	5.94%
Unidos	3.59%
Canarias Decide	2.20%
PACMA	1.23%
ASG	0.56%
Others	3.14%
Blank ballots	1.83%

Seats
CCa–PNC	30.00%
PSOE	25.00%
PP	20.00%
Podemos	11.67%
NCa	8.33%
ASG	5.00%

=== Distribution by constituency ===
Constituency	PSOE		PP		CC–PNC		Podemos		NCa		ASG	
Constituency	%	S	%	S	%	S	%	S	%	S	%	S
El Hierro	22.1	1	17.1	−	41.8	2	6.7	−	6.5	−		
Fuerteventura	17.4	2	13.6	1	28.1	3	12.2	1	6.7	−		
Gran Canaria	17.5	3	20.4	4	6.2	1	17.0	3	18.4	4		
La Gomera	16.4	1	10.3	−	10.5	−	8.8	−	5.9	−	43.0	3
La Palma	24.6	2	24.7	3	30.3	3	6.5	−	2.8	−		
Lanzarote	21.0	2	13.0	1	22.2	3	14.7	1	8.3	1		
Tenerife	22.0	4	17.5	3	27.6	6	13.4	2	3.4	−		
Total	19.9	15	18.6	12	18.2	18	14.5	7	10.2	5	0.6	3

== Aftermath ==
=== Government formation ===
Investiture; Nomination of Fernando Clavijo (CCa)
Ballot →	7 July 2015
Required majority →	31 out of 60
Yes: • CCa–PNC (18); • PSOE (15); • ASG (3)	36 / 60
No: • PP (12); • Podemos (7); • NCa (4)	23 / 60
Abstentions	0 / 60
Absentees: • NCa (1)	1 / 60

== Bibliography ==
- Ley Orgánica 10/1982, de 10 de agosto, de Estatuto de Autonomía de Canarias (Organic Law 10/1982). Official State Gazette (in Spanish). 10 August 1982 [version as of 17 July 2010]. BOE-A-1982-20821.
- Ley Orgánica 5/1985, de 19 de junio, del Régimen Electoral General (Organic Law 5/1985). Official State Gazette (in Spanish). 19 June 1985 [version as of 31 March 2015]. BOE-A-1985-11672.
- Ley 7/2003, de 20 de marzo, de Elecciones al Parlamento de Canarias (Law 7/2003). Official State Gazette (in Spanish). 20 March 2003 [version as of 20 April 2007]. BOE-A-2003-7685.
- Decreto 26/2015, de 30 de marzo, del Presidente de la Comunidad Autónoma de Canarias, por el que se convocan elecciones al Parlamento de Canarias (Decree 26/2015). Official Gazette of the Canaries (in Spanish). 30 March 2015. BOC-A-2015-062-1435.
