= José Miguel Pérez García =

Spanish politician (1957–2024)

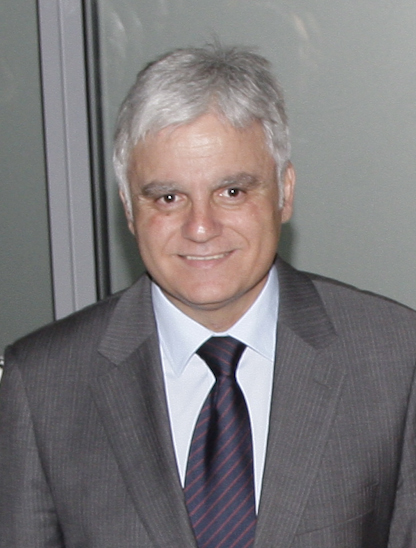
- Pérez in 2010

Member of the Parliament of the Canary Islands for Gran Canaria
- In office 22 May 2011 – 23 June 2015

Personal details
- Born: 10 April 1957 Las Palmas, Spain
- Died: 18 November 2024 (aged 67) Las Palmas, Spain
- Party: PSC-PSOE
- Education: University of La Laguna
- Occupation: Academic

José Miguel Pérez García (10 April 1957 – 18 November 2024) was a Spanish academic and politician. A member of the Socialist Party of the Canaries, he served in the Parliament of the Canary Islands from 2011 to 2015. He was Vicepresident of the Canarian government and regional minister of Education between 2011 and 2014.

Pérez died in Las Palmas on 18 November 2024, at the age of 67.
