= Enrique Pérez Parrilla =

Spanish politician (1948 - 2021)

Enrique Pérez Parrilla (20 February 1948 – 14 August 2021) was a Spanish politician from the Socialist Party of the Canaries.

Pérez Parrilla was born in Arrecife, province of Las Palmas on 20 February 1948 in a family of merchants. In 1970 he got a degree in Physical Sciences from the University of Barcelona. He later worked as a Maths schoolteacher. He joined the Lanzarote socialist group in June 1975 when the PSOE was clandestine and in the UGT union. In the 1977 and 1979 general election he was candidate to the Congress of Deputies for Las Palmas province but on none of the occasions was he elected deputy.

He was president of the Lanzarote Insular Cabildo in four times: between 1983 and 1987, 1994 and 1995, 1996 and 1999, and 1999-2003. He later was elected mayor of Arrecife, office he held between 2007 and 2009. He was also member of the Parliament of the Canary Islands.

He died on 14 August 2021, at the age of 73 in his house of Arrecife where he suffered a heart attack. The cabildo decreed three days of official mourning.
