= Australia Navarro =

Spanish politician

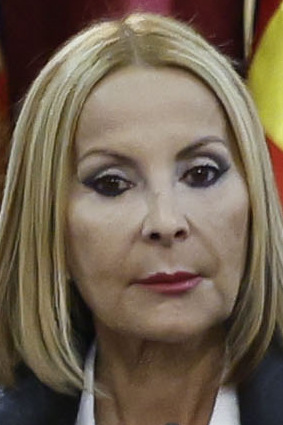
- Born: 6 February 1961 (age 65); Las Palmas de Gran Canaria, province of Las Palmas, Spain
- Education: National University of Distance Education; University of Las Palmas de Gran Canaria
- Political party: People's Party of the Canary Islands

Maria Australia Navarro de Paz (born 1961) is a Spanish politician from the People's Party and leader of the People's Party of the Canary Islands in the Parliament of the Canary Islands.

== Early life ==
Navarro was born in Las Palmas on 6 February 1961. She holds a law degree and a diploma in marriage law from the National University of Distance Education and received her PhD from the University of Las Palmas de Gran Canaria.

== Career ==
Navarro began her professional career as a lawyer and has her own firm. From 2000 to 2002, she was the Regional Deputy Secretary of Institutional Relations for the People's Party in Canary Islands. Following her election to the Parliament of the Canary Islands from Gran Canaria in 2003, she became the counselor of the Presidency and Justice in the government, a post she held till 2005. Navarro has been the regional deputy of People's Party (PP) in Canary Islands during the regional elections held in 2003, 2007, 2011 and 2015. She currently represents Gran Canaria in the Parliament of the Canary Islands. She is also a member of the National Executive Committee and National Board of PP.
