= Agreement of Nationalist Unity =

Agreement of Nationalist Unity Acuerdo de Unidad Nacionalista
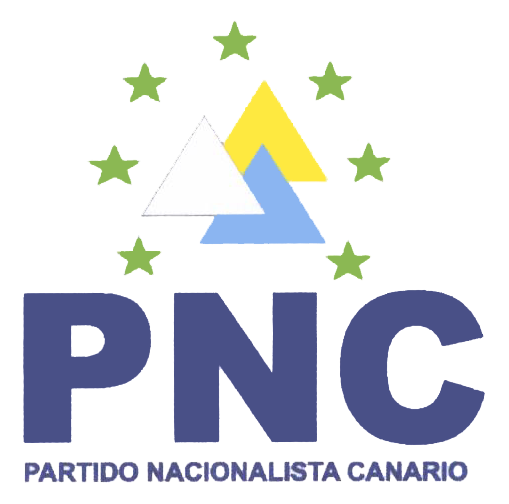
- Founded: June 2006
- Dissolved: April 2023
- Ideology: Regionalism; Canarian nationalism Factions: Liberalism; Federalism
- Political position: Centre to centre-right
- Member parties: CC; PNC; AHI (Note: The Independent Herrenian Group was not formally part of the Agreement of Nationalist Unity, but since the alliance's formation it had contested all elections in electoral alliance with Canarian Coalition.); Former: CCN (Note: Only for the 2011 regional election.); NC (Note: Only for the 2011 and November 2019 elections.); UxGC (Note: Only for the 2019 regional election.)

The Agreement of Nationalist Unity (Spanish: Acuerdo de Unidad Nacionalista), frequently known under the name of its constituent parties, Canarian Coalition–Canarian Nationalist Party (Spanish: Coalición Canaria–Partido Nacionalista Canario, CC–PNC), was a permanent Canarian nationalist alliance formed by Canarian Coalition (CC) and Canarian Nationalist Party (PNC) in 2006 ahead of the 2007 Canarian regional election. The alliance has been renewed several times, in 2011, 2013 and 2018. For the 2011 and November 2019 general elections it was joined by New Canaries (NC). The alliance was dissolved in 2023.

== Composition ==
=== Members ===
Party
Canarian Coalition (CCa)
Canarian Nationalist Party (PNC)

=== Allies ===
Party
Independent Herrenian Group (AHI)

=== Former members ===
Party
Nationalist Canarian Centre (CCN)
New Canaries (NCa)
United for Gran Canaria (UxGC)

== Electoral performance ==
=== Parliament of the Canary Islands ===
Parliament of the Canary Islands
Election	Vote	%	Score	Seats	+/–	Leader	Status in legislature	
Election	Vote	%	Score	Seats	+/–	Leader	Status	Period
2007	225,878	24.15%	2nd	19 / 60	4	Paulino Rivero	Majority coalition (CC–PP)	2007–2010
2007	225,878	24.15%	2nd	19 / 60	4	Paulino Rivero	Minority government	2010–2011
2011	225,948	24.94%	2nd	21 / 60	2	Paulino Rivero	Majority coalition (CC–PSOE)	2011–2016
2015	166,979	18.25%	3rd	18 / 60	3	Fernando Clavijo	Majority coalition (CC–PSOE)	2011–2016
2015	166,979	18.25%	3rd	18 / 60	3	Fernando Clavijo	Minority government	2016–2019
2019	194,846	21.82%	2nd	20 / 70	2	Fernando Clavijo	Opposition	2019–2023
2023	192,203	21.84%	2nd	19 / 70	1	Fernando Clavijo	Minority government (CC–PP–AHI)	2023–present

=== Cortes Generales ===
Cortes Generales
Election	Congress					Senate		Leader	Status in legislature	
Election	Vote	%	Score	Seats	+/–	Seats	+/–	Leader	Status	Period
2008	174,629	0.68%	9th	2 / 350	1 (Note: Compared to Canarian Coalition totals in the 2004 general election.)	1 / 208	2	Ana Oramas	Opposition	2008–present
2011	143,881	0.59%	11th	2 / 350	0	1 / 208	0	Ana Oramas	Opposition	2008–present
2015	81,917	0.32%	12th	1 / 350	1	1 / 208	0	Ana Oramas	Opposition	2008–present
2016	78,253	0.33%	10th	1 / 350	0	1 / 208	0	Ana Oramas	Opposition	2008–present
2019 (Apr)	137,664	0.53%	12th	2 / 350	1	0 / 208	1	Ana Oramas	Opposition	2008–present
2019 (Nov)	123,981	0.51%	13th	2 / 350	0	0 / 208	0	Ana Oramas	Opposition	2008–present

Election	Canary Islands						
Election	Congress					Senate	
Election	Vote	%	Score	Seats	+/–	Seats	+/–
2008	174,629	17.49%	3rd	2 / 15	1	1 / 11	2
2011	143,881	15.47%	3rd	2 / 15	0	1 / 11	0
2015	81,917	8.24%	5th	1 / 15	1	1 / 11	0
2016	78,253	7.99%	5th	1 / 15	0	1 / 11	0
2019 (Apr)	137,664	12.97%	5th	2 / 15	1	0 / 11	1
2019 (Nov)	123,981	13.12%	4th	2 / 15	0	0 / 11	0

=== European Parliament ===
European Parliament
Election	Spain			Canary Islands	
Election	Vote	%	Seats	Vote	%
2009	with CEU	–	0 / 54	96,297 (#3)	15.84
2014	with CEU	–	0 / 54	69,601 (#3)	12.18
2019	with CEUS	–	0 / 54	186,372 (#2)	20.79
2024	with CEUS	–	0 / 54	70,008 (#4)	10.29
