= Noemí Santana =

Spanish politician (born 1984)

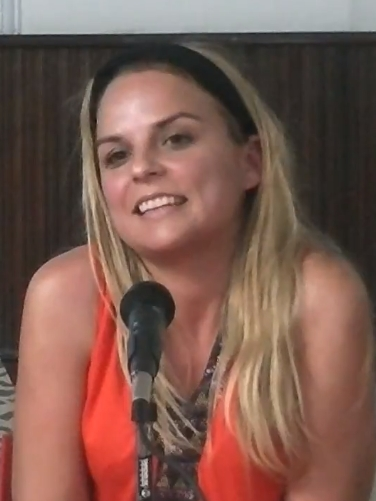
- Born: Noemí Santana Perera; 1984 (age 41–42)

Noemí Santana Perera (born 1984) is a Spanish politician. She is a member of Podemos and its spokesperson in the Parliament of the Canary Islands.

== Early life ==
Born in Las Palmas on 31 January 1984, Santana attended the University of Las Palmas de Gran Canaria (ULPGC) from where she received her degree in Business Administration and Management. As a student there, she joined the university's student assembly. Later she enrolled in the law course of National University of Distance Education.

== Career ==
Upon the insistence of one of her professors, Santana joined the New Canaries in 2007 and served on its National Executive Committee but being disenchanted, she left it after some time. After attending its first rally in Las Palmas, she became a member of Podemos. During the 2015 Canarian regional election, Podemos made her its official candidate for the post of the President of the Canary Islands.

Santana became a Member of Parliament from Gran Canaria and was chosen the spokesperson of Podemos in the house. She has also worked at the Gran Canaria railway company.

She was elected to the 15th Congress of Deputies in the 2023 Spanish general election.
