= Asier Antona =

Spanish politician (born 1976)

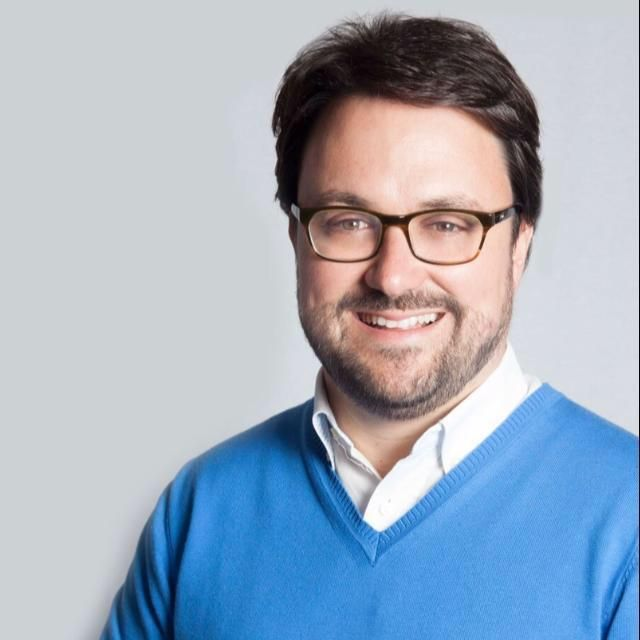

Senator in the Cortes Generales by appointment of the Parliament of the Canary Islands
- In office 31 July 2019 – 2023

President of People's Party of the Canary Islands
- In office 22 April 2016 – 30 July 2019

Personal details
- Born: Asier Antona Gomez; 27 December 1976 (age 49) Bilbao, Spain
- Party: People's Party of the Canary Islands
- Education: University of the Basque Country

Asier Antona Gómez (born 27 December 1976 in Bilbao, Spain) is a Spanish politician and senator. He is the current senator representing the Canary Islands in the Senate of Spain. Gomez was appointed senator as a representative from the Canary Islands by the Parliament of the Canary Islands.

Antona attended the University of the Basque Country where he studied Political Science and Administration and subsequently graduated with a BSc in Political Science. After his education, he went into politics sitting on several committee positions in government ministries.

On 22 April 2016 he was appointed the President of People's Party of the Canary Islands after resignation of José Manuel Soria. Before being appointed President, he was the General Secretary of the People's Party of the Canary Islands. In 2019, he was appointed Senator alongside Fernando Clavijo Batlle to represent Canary Islands.

He was elected to the 15th Congress of Deputies in the 2023 Spanish general election.
