= Canarian Nationalist Party =

Canarian Nationalist Party Partido Nacionalista Canario
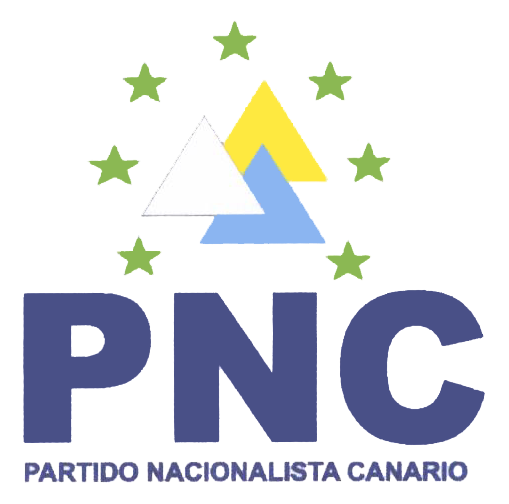
- Leader: Juan Manuel García Ramos
- Founded: 30 January 1924; Refounded in 1982
- Headquarters: C/. Bernabé Rodríguez 13, Santa Cruz de Tenerife
- Ideology: Canarian nationalism
- Political position: Centre
- National affiliation: CEUS (2019–2024)
- Regional affiliation: Canarian Nationalist Federation (1999–2007); Agreement of Nationalist Unity (2006–2023)
- Colours: White, blue, yellow and green
- Canarian Parliament: 0 / 60
- Congress of Deputies (Canarian seats): 0 / 15
- Spanish Senate (Canarian seats): 0 / 14

Party flag

The Cuban PNC adopted the 1907 "Ateneo Flag", which was the first Canarian nationalist flag.

The Nationalist Canary Party (Spanish: Partido Nacionalista Canario, PNC) is a nationalist political party in the Canary Islands. Its current headquarters are in Santa Cruz de Tenerife, Tenerife.

== Precedents ==
The first PNC (CNP) was founded in Havana, Cuba on 30 January 1924, by Jose G. Cabrera Díaz, a Canarian journalist who became president of the party. He had been a trade union leader of Canary workers. On 5 August 1900, they had founded the Working Canary Association. In the 1920s, Díaz left his working-class roots to defend the interests of the middle class. Though the Cuban PNC proclaimed itself as inheritor of Secundino Delgado's thought, the party ideology was far away from the near to anarchism ideas of national and social liberation by Delgado.

The newspaper El Guanche, founded in 1897, was a primary supporter of the party. The party adopted its proposition for the flag of an independent Canaries state, the "Flag of the Ateneo" (also called "Secundino's Flag"), that is to say, with seven white stars on a blue background arranged to match the position of the country's various islands.

== History ==
In 1982, the newly created PNC held its first congress in the Canary Islands. The party adopted as symbols the 1970s MPAIAC flag, apart from the "Ateneo Flag", as well as some of the Cuban PNC political positions.

In 1993, the party merged with others to form Canarian Coalition (CC), but left the group in 1998. In 2003, after tensions between the militants and the direction, a splinter group formed another "Partido Nacionalista Canario", known as PaNaCa, which accused PNC of betraying its nationalist demands. Finally, PaNaCa joined CC.

== Electoral performance ==
=== Parliament of the Canary Islands ===
Election	Island constituencies		Regional constituency		Seats	+/–	Government
Election	Votes	%	Votes	%	Seats	+/–	Government
1991	7,845	1.1 (#6)			0 / 60	0	Extra-parliamentary
1995	Within CC				1 / 60	1	Coalition
1999	Within FNC				0 / 60	1	Extra-parliamentary
2003	Within FNC				0 / 60	0	Extra-parliamentary
2007	Within CCa–PNC				0 / 60	0	Extra-parliamentary
2011	Within CCa–PNC				0 / 60	0	Extra-parliamentary
2015	Within CCa–PNC				1 / 60	1	Coalition
2019	Within CCa–PNC				1 / 70	0	Opposition
2023	2,472	0.3 (#14)	2,317	0.3 (#13)	0 / 70	1	Extra-parliamentary

=== Cortes Generales ===
From 2006 to 2023, the PNC participated in the Agreement of Nationalist Unity alliance with the Canarian Coalition. As part of the alliance, the party contested elections to the parliament of Spain, the Cortes Generales. The alliance was dissolved in 2023 and did not contest that year's election, with the PNC arguing that the CC had now "nothing of nationalism". The following results are for the coalition as a whole, not solely the PNC.

Election	Canary Islands delegation to the Cortes Generales						
Election	Congress					Senate	
Election	Vote	%	Score	Seats	+/–	Seats	+/–
2008	174,629	17.49%	3rd	2 / 15	1 (Note: Compared to Canarian Coalition totals in the 2004 general election.)	1 / 11	2
2011	143,881	15.47%	3rd	2 / 15	0	1 / 11	0
2015	81,917	8.24%	5th	1 / 15	1	1 / 11	0
2016	78,253	7.99%	5th	1 / 15	0	1 / 11	0
2019 (Apr)	137,664	12.97%	5th	2 / 15	1	0 / 11	1
2019 (Nov)	123,981	13.12%	4th	2 / 15	0	0 / 11	0

== See also ==
- Canarian nationalism
