= Sí Podemos Canarias =

- Founded: 6 March 2019
- Ideology: Left-wing populism Direct democracy Democratic socialism
- Political position: Left-wing
- Member parties: Podemos; SSP; Equo
- Canarian Parliament: 4 / 70

Sí Podemos Canarias (English: Yes We Can Canaries), was an electoral alliance formed by Yes We Can (Podemos), Yes We Can (SSP) and Equo in March 2019 ahead of the 2019 Canarian regional election.

== Composition ==
Party
We Can (Podemos)
Yes We Can (SSP)
Equo (Equo)
