= New Canaries =

New Canaries Nueva Canarias
- Leader: Román Rodríguez Rodríguez
- Founder: Román Rodríguez Rodríguez
- Founded: February 2005
- Split from: Canarian Coalition
- Ideology: Canarian nationalism Left-wing nationalism Social democracy Federalism
- Political position: Centre-left to left-wing
- National affiliation: Sumar (since 2024)
- Regional affiliation: Agreement of Nationalist Unity (2011, 2019); Canarian People's Unity (since 2026)
- European affiliation: European Free Alliance
- Congress of Deputies Canarian seats: 0 / 15
- Spanish Senate Canarian seats: 0 / 14
- European Parliament: 0 / 61
- Canarian Parliament: 5 / 60
- Island councils: 13 / 157
- Mayors: 6 / 88
- Municipal councillors: 118 / 1,402

Website
- nuevacanariasbc.org

New Canaries (Spanish: Nueva Canarias) is a social democratic, Canarian nationalist political party representing the Canary Islands territory of Spain. The party is a member of the European Free Alliance.

== Electoral performance ==
=== Parliament of the Canary Islands ===
Election	Island constituencies		Regional constituency		Seats	+/–	Government
Election	Votes	%	Votes	%	Seats	+/–	Government
2007	50,749	5.4 (#4)			0 / 60	0	Extra-parliamentary
2011	82,148	9.1 (#4)			3 / 60	3	Opposition
2015	93,634	10.2 (#5)			5 / 60	2	Opposition
2019	80,891	9.1 (#4)	82,478	9.3 (#4)	5 / 70	0	Coalition
2023	71,021	8.1 (#4)	63,251	7.2 (#5)	5 / 70	0	Opposition

=== Cortes Generales ===
Cortes Generales
Election	Congress							Senate		Status
Election	Vote	%	Score	% (Note: In the Canary Islands.)	Score	Seats	+/–	Seats	+/–	Status
2008	38,024	0.1	18th	3.8	4th	0 / 15	0	0 / 11	0	No seats
2011	w. CC–NC–PNC					1 / 15	1	0 / 11	0	Opposition
2015	w. PSOE–NCa					1 / 15	0	0 / 11	0	Opposition
2016	w. PSOE–NCa					1 / 15	0	1 / 11	1	Opposition
2019 (Apr)	36,193	0.1	18th	3.4	7th	0 / 15	1	0 / 11	1	No seats
2019 (Nov)	w. CC–NC–PNC					1 / 15	1	0 / 11	0	Opposition
2023	45,595	0.18	15th	4.45	6th	0 / 15	1	0 / 11	0	No seats
