= People's Party of the Canary Islands =

Political party in Canary Island

People's Party of the Canary Islands Partido Popular de Canarias
- President: Asier Antona
- Secretary-General: Australia Navarro
- Founded: 1989
- Headquarters: C/ Albareda, 3 Las Palmas de Gran Canaria, Canary Islands
- Ideology: Conservatism; Christian democracy
- Political position: Centre-right
- National affiliation: People's Party
- Canarian Parliament: 15 / 60
- Congress of Deputies (Canarian seats): 6 / 15
- Senate (Canarian seats): 3 / 14

Website
- www.ppdecanarias.com

The People's Party of the Canary Islands (Spanish: Partido Popular de Canarias, PP) is the regional branch of the People's Party of Spain (PP) in the Canary Islands. It was formed in 1989 from the re-foundation of the People's Alliance. In the 2023 Canarian regional elections, the party won 15 seats and 176,308 votes, representing 19.3% of the total vote.
