= Socialist Party of the Canaries =

Canarian federation of the centre-left Spanish political party

Socialist Party of the Canaries Partido Socialista de Canarias
- Leader: José Miguel Rodríguez Fraga (head of the temporary caretaker committee)
- President: Caretaker committee
- Secretary-General: Caretaker committee
- Headquarters: Av. Islas Canarias, 136, 38007 Santa Cruz de Tenerife
- Youth wing: Socialist Youth of the Canaries
- Membership (2017): 6,338
- Ideology: Social democracy
- Political position: Centre-left
- National affiliation: Spanish Socialist Workers' Party
- Congress of Deputies (Canarian seats): 6 / 15
- Spanish Senate (Canarian seats): 7 / 11
- Canarian Parliament: 23 / 70
- Island councils: 38 / 155
- Town councillors (2015–2019): 375 / 1,337

Website
- psoecanarias.com/web/

The Socialist Party of the Canaries (Spanish: Partido Socialista de Canarias, PSC-PSOE) is the Canarian federation of the Spanish Socialist Workers' Party (PSOE), the main centre-left party in Spain since the 1970s.

== Electoral performance ==
=== Parliament of the Canary Islands ===
Parliament of the Canary Islands
Election	Votes	%	#	Seats	+/–	Leading candidate	Status in legislature
1983	233,991	41.18%	1st	27 / 60	—	Jerónimo Saavedra	Government
1987	185,749	27.77%	1st	21 / 60	2	Jerónimo Saavedra	Opposition
1991	229,692	33.03%	1st	23 / 60	2	Jerónimo Saavedra	Coalition (1991–1993)
1991	229,692	33.03%	1st	23 / 60	2	Jerónimo Saavedra	Opposition (1993–1995)
1995	183,969	23.08%	3rd	16 / 60	7	Augusto Brito	Opposition
1999	199,503	24.03%	2nd	19 / 60	3	Jerónimo Saavedra	Opposition
2003	235,234	25.42%	3rd	17 / 60	2	Juan Carlos Alemán	Opposition
2007	322,833	34.51%	1st	26 / 60	9	Juan Fernando López Aguilar	Opposition
2011	190,028	20.98%	3rd	15 / 60	11	José Miguel Pérez García	Coalition
2015	182,006	19.89%	1st	15 / 60	0	Patricia Hernández	Coalition (2015–2016)
2015	182,006	19.89%	1st	15 / 60	0	Patricia Hernández	Opposition (2016–2019)
2019	258,255	28.88%	1st	25 / 70	10	Ángel Víctor Torres	Coalition
2023	239,070	27.17%	1st	23 / 70	2	Ángel Víctor Torres	Opposition

=== Cortes Generales ===
Cortes Generales
Election	Canary Islands						
Election	Congress					Senate	
Election	Votes	%	#	Seats	+/–	Seats	+/–
1977	90,567	16.55%	2nd	3 / 13	—	1 / 10	—
1979	95,220	17.82%	2nd	3 / 13	0	1 / 11	0
1982	239,615	36.65%	1st	7 / 13	4	5 / 11	4
1986	241,197	36.06%	1st	6 / 13	1	7 / 11	2
1989	242,035	36.10%	1st	7 / 14	1	6 / 11	1
1993	241,648	29.85%	2nd	5 / 14	2	4 / 11	2
1996	263,249	29.97%	2nd	5 / 14	0	5 / 11	1
2000	186,363	22.19%	3rd	3 / 14	2	1 / 11	4
2004	333,084	34.45%	2nd	6 / 15	3	5 / 11	4
2008	395,182	39.57%	1st	7 / 15	1	7 / 11	2
2011	231,086	24.85%	2nd	4 / 15	3	3 / 11	4
2015 (Note: Electoral alliance with New Canaries.)	218,413	21.97%	3rd	4 / 15	0	1 / 11	2
2016	220,471	22.52%	2nd	3 / 15	1	1 / 11	0
2019 (Apr)	295,474	27.83%	1st	5 / 15	2	8 / 11	7
2019 (Nov)	273,596	28.88%	1st	5 / 15	0	7 / 11	1
2023	341,261	33.34%	1st	6 / 15	1	7 / 11	0

=== European Parliament ===
European Parliament
Election	Canary Islands		
Election	Votes	%	#
1987	200,405	32.70%	1st
1989	181,332	34.89%	1st
1994	149,626	24.81%	2nd
1999	200,628	24.54%	3rd
2004	206,168	38.50%	2nd
2009	218,968	36.02%	2nd
2014	126,980	22.22%	2nd
2019	287,033	32.01%	1st
