= 2027 Canarian regional election =

Election in the Spanish region of the Canary Islands

Next Canarian regional election
- No later than 27 June 2027

All 70 seats in the Parliament of the Canary Islands 36 seats needed for a majority
- Opinion polls
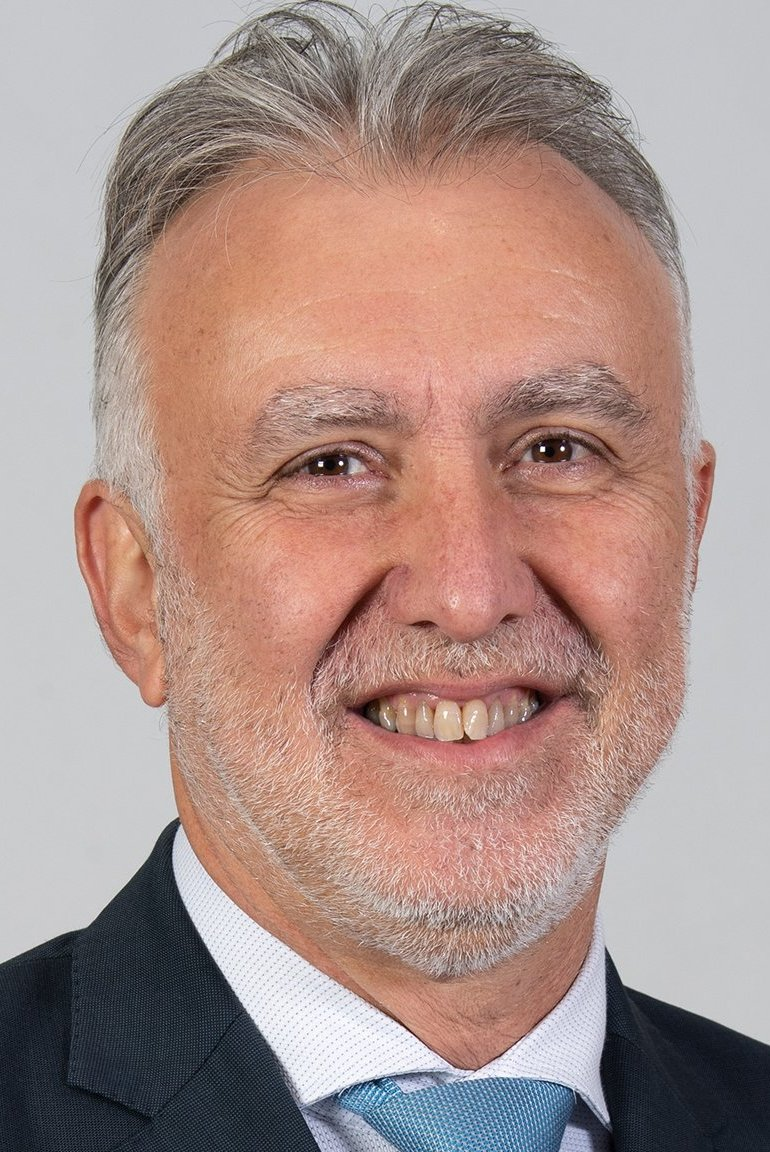

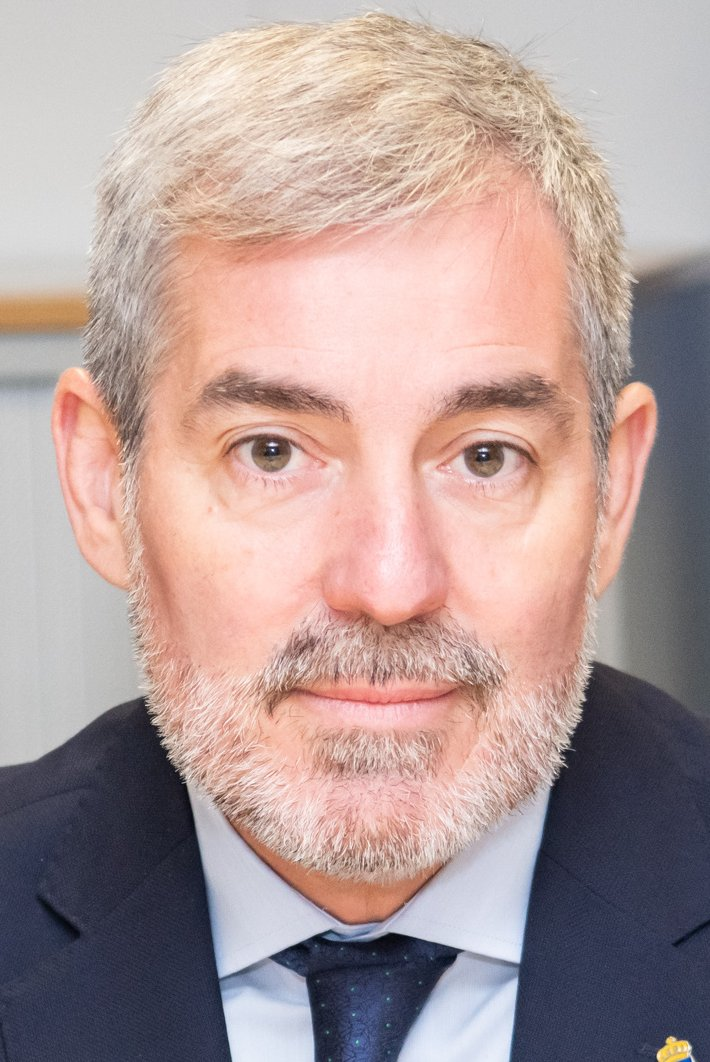

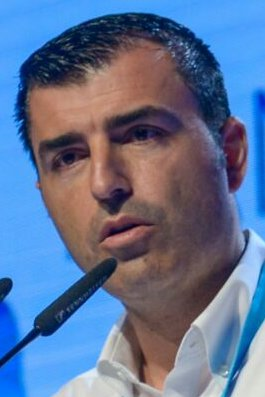

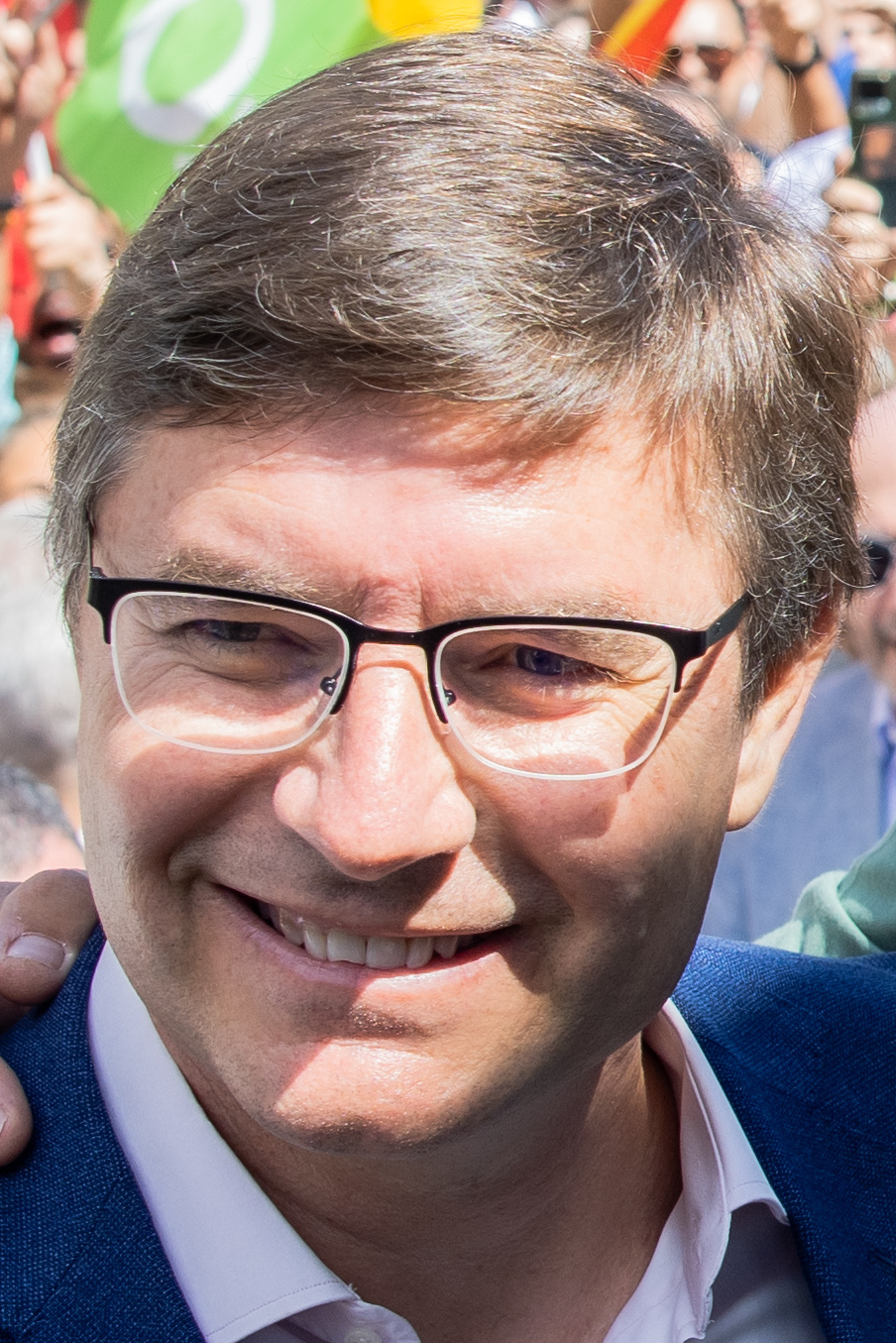

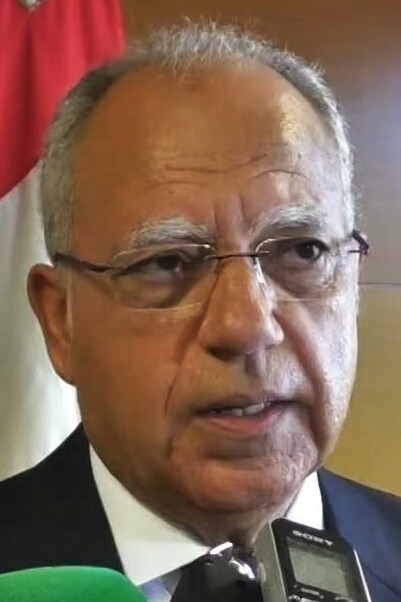
Leader	Ángel Víctor Torres	Fernando Clavijo	Manuel Domínguez
Party	PSOE	CCa	PP
Leader since	16 September 2017	12 September 2014	23 January 2022
Leader's seat	— (Note: Currently serving as minister of Territorial Policy and Democratic Memory in the government of Spain.)	Regional	Regional
Last election	23 seats, 27.2%	19 seats, 22.1%	15 seats, 19.3%
Current seats	23	19	15
Seats needed	▲13	▲17	▲21
Leader	Luis Campos	Nicasio Galván	Casimiro Curbelo
Party	NC–BC	Vox	ASG
Leader since	27 July 2025	29 December 2022	6 March 2015
Leader's seat	Gran Canaria	Gran Canaria	La Gomera
Last election	5 seats, 7.9%	4 seats, 7.9%	3 seats, 0.7%
Current seats	5	3	3
Seats needed	▲31	▲32	▲33
Incumbent President
Fernando Clavijo
CCa

A regional election will be held in the Canary Islands no later than 27 June 2027 to elect the 12th Parliament of the autonomous community. All 70 seats in the Parliament will be up for election. If customary practice is maintained, the election will be held on 23 May 2027, simultaneously with regional elections in at least seven other autonomous communities and local elections all across Spain.

== Overview ==
Under the 2018 Statute of Autonomy, the Parliament of the Canary Islands is the unicameral legislature of the homonymous autonomous community, having legislative power in devolved matters, as well as the ability to grant or withdraw confidence from a regional president. The electoral and procedural rules are supplemented by national law provisions.

=== Date ===
The term of the Parliament of the Canary Islands expires four years after the date of its previous election, unless it is dissolved earlier. The election decree shall be issued no later than 25 days before the scheduled expiration date of parliament and published on the following day in the Official Gazette of the Canaries (BOC), with election day taking place 54 days after the decree's publication. The previous election was held on 28 May 2023, which means that the chamber's term will expire on 28 May 2027. The election decree shall be published in the BOC no later than 4 May 2027, setting the latest possible date for election day on 27 June 2027.

The regional president has the prerogative to dissolve the Parliament of the Canary Islands at any given time and call a snap election, provided that no motion of no confidence is in process and that dissolution does not occur before one year after a previous one. In the event of an investiture process failing to elect a regional president within a two-month period from the Parliament's reconvening, the chamber is to be automatically dissolved and a fresh election called.

=== Electoral system ===
Voting for the Parliament is based on universal suffrage, comprising all Spanish nationals over 18 years of age, registered in the Canary Islands and with full political rights, provided that they have not been deprived of the right to vote by a final sentence.

The Parliament of the Canary Islands has a minimum of 50 and a maximum of 75 seats, with electoral provisions fixing its size at 70. All are elected in eight multi-member constituencies—corresponding to the islands of El Hierro, Fuerteventura, Gran Canaria, La Gomera, La Palma, Lanzarote and Tenerife, as well as an additional constituency comprising the whole archipelago, each of which is assigned a fixed number of seats—using the D'Hondt method and closed-list proportional voting, with a 15 percent-threshold of valid votes (including blank ballots) in each constituency or four percent regionally.

As a result of the aforementioned allocation, each Parliament constituency is entitled the following seats:

Seats	Constituencies
15	Gran Canaria, Tenerife
9	Regional
8	Fuerteventura, La Palma, Lanzarote
4	La Gomera
3	El Hierro

The law does not provide for by-elections to fill vacant seats; instead, any vacancies arising after the proclamation of candidates and during the legislative term will be filled by the next candidates on the party lists or, when required, by designated substitutes.

=== Current parliament ===
The table below shows the composition of the parliamentary groups in the chamber at the present time.

Current parliamentary composition
Groups	Parties	Legislators	
Groups	Parties	Seats	Total
Canarian Socialist Parliamentary Group	PSOE	23	23
Canarian Nationalist Parliamentary Group (CCa)	CCa	19	19
People's Parliamentary Group	PP	15	15
New Canaries–Canarian Bloc Parliamentary Group (NC–BC)	NC–BC	5	5
Vox Parliamentary Group	Vox	3	3
Gomera Socialist Group Parliamentary Group (ASG)	ASG	3	3
Mixed Parliamentary Group	AHI	1	1
Non-Inscrits	INDEP	1 (Note: Marta Gómez, former Vox legislator.)	1

== Parties and candidates ==
The electoral law allows for parties and federations registered in the interior ministry, alliances and groupings of electors to present lists of candidates. Parties and federations intending to form an alliance are required to inform the relevant electoral commission within 10 days of the election call, whereas groupings of electors need to secure the signature of at least one percent of the electorate in the constituencies for which they seek election, disallowing electors from signing for more than one list. Additionally, a balanced composition of men and women was required in the electoral lists through the use of a zipper system.

Below is a list of the main parties and alliances which will likely contest the election:

Candidacy	Parties and alliances	Candidate	Ideology	Previous result		Gov.	Ref.
Candidacy	Parties and alliances	Candidate	Ideology	Vote %	Seats	Gov.	Ref.
PSOE	List: Spanish Socialist Workers' Party (PSOE)	Ángel Víctor Torres	Social democracy	27.2%	23	No	
CCa	List: Canarian Coalition (CCa)	Fernando Clavijo	Regionalism; Canarian nationalism Centrism	22.1%	19	Yes	
PP	List: People's Party (PP)	Manuel Domínguez	Conservatism; Christian democracy	19.3%	15	Yes	
NC–BC	List: New Canaries–Canarian Bloc (NC–BC)	Luis Campos	Canarian nationalism Social democracy	7.9%	5	No	
Vox	List: Vox (Vox)	Nicasio Galván	Right-wing populism Ultranationalism; National conservatism	7.9%	4	No	
ASG	List: Gomera Socialist Group (ASG)	Casimiro Curbelo	Insularism; Social democracy	0.7%	3	Yes	
AHI	List: Independent Herrenian Group (AHI); Canarian Coalition (CCa) (Note: In El Hierro.); New Canaries–Canarian Bloc (NC–BC); Frontera Union (UF)	Raúl Acosta	Insularism; Canarian nationalism Centrism	0.2%	1	No	

== Opinion polls ==
The tables below list opinion polling results in reverse chronological order, showing the most recent first and using the dates when the survey fieldwork was done, as opposed to the date of publication. Where the fieldwork dates are unknown, the date of publication is given instead. The highest percentage figure in each polling survey is displayed with its background shaded in the leading party's colour. If a tie ensues, this is applied to the figures with the highest percentages. The "Lead" column on the right shows the percentage-point difference between the parties with the highest percentages in a poll.

=== Voting intention estimates ===
The table below lists weighted voting intention estimates. Refusals are generally excluded from the party vote percentages, while question wording and the treatment of "don't know" responses and those not intending to vote may vary between polling organisations. When available, seat projections determined by the polling organisations are displayed below (or in place of) the percentages in a smaller font; 36 seats are required for an absolute majority in the Parliament of the Canary Islands.

Polling firm/Commissioner	Fieldwork date	Sample size	Turnout	PSOE	CCa	PP	NCa	Vox	USP	DVC	UxGC	ASG	CS	AHI	Sumar	SALF	1º CAN	Lead
Sigma Dos/El Mundo	27 May–5 Jun 2026	1,600	?	25.9; 22/23	21.3; 19/20	17.7; 13/14	5.0; 1/2	12.8; 7/8	3.7; 0	–	–	0.8; 3	–	0.2; 1	3.4; 0	–	–	4.6
EM-Analytics/Electomanía	1–28 May 2026	1,355	?	25.5; 22	24.5; 22	21.4; 17	5.0; 1	8.2; 4	3.7; 0	2.8; 0	–	0.8; 3	–	0.1; 1	2.4; 0	1.0; 0	1.7; 0	1.0
GCEMOP/Atlántico Hoy	19–25 May 2026	1,639	?	25.0– 26.0; 21/24	20.0– 21.0; 21	16.0– 17.0; 15/16	4.0– 5.0; 0	13.0– 14.0; 7/9	–	–	–	0.5– 1.0; 3	–	(Note: Within CCa.)	–	–	–	5.0
Areópago Genuina 26/UNED	20 Oct–10 Nov 2025	1,511	?	26.6; 20/24	22.7; 17/19	17.8; 14/16	7.4; 4/5	11.3; 4/6	3.9; 0	3.1; 0	1.1; 0	0.7; 3	–	0.2; 1	–	–	1.9; 0	3.9
NC Report/La Razón	16–31 May 2025	400	49.3	? 21	? 22	? 18	? 2	? 3	–	–	–	? 3	–	? 1	–	–	–	?
Sigma Dos/El Mundo	12–27 May 2025	1,109	?	27.8; 21/23	22.2; 19/20	21.3; 17/18	6.0; 3/4	9.5; 3/5	2.5; 0	–	–	1.0; 3	–	0.2; 1	–	–	–	5.6
Ágora Integral/Canarias Ahora	15–26 May 2025	2,100	52	28.2; 23	23.8; 21	22.5; 17	4.6; 1	8.2; 4	3.3; 0	2.4; 0	–	? 3	–	? 1	–	–	2.5; 0	4.4
EM-Analytics/GMG	25 Apr–5 May 2025	1,204	?	27.4; 24	24.0; 21	20.1; 16	5.1; 2	7.0; 3	2.7; 0	2.1; 0	1.3; 0	0.7; 3	–	0.2; 1	2.5; 0	2.0; 0	–	3.4
2024 EP election	9 Jun 2024	—N/a	37.2	30.5 (27)	10.3 (8)	29.3 (25)	(Note: Within Sumar.)	12.0 (8)	3.4 (0)	–	–	–	0.4 (0)	–	4.0 (0)	6.3 (2)	–	1.2
EM-Analytics/GMG	1–24 May 2024	1,207	?	25.7; 22	23.9; 21	22.0; 16	8.5; 5	7.3; 2	1.0; 0	2.7; 0	1.5; 0	0.7; 3	0.4; 0	0.2; 1	1.5; 0	–	–	1.8
2023 general election	23 Jul 2023	—N/a	58.2	33.3 (27)	11.4 (8)	30.4 (24)	4.5 (1)	7.6 (4)			–	–	–	–	10.5 (6)	–	–	2.9
2023 regional election	28 May 2023	—N/a	52.0	27.2; 23	22.1; 19	19.3; 15	7.9; 5	7.9; 4	3.9; 0	3.2; 0	1.9; 0	0.7; 3	0.4; 0	0.2; 1	–	–	–	5.1

=== Voting preferences ===
The table below lists raw, unweighted voting preferences.

Polling firm/Commissioner	Fieldwork date	Sample size	PSOE	CCa	PP	NCa	Vox	USP	DVC	ASG	Sumar	SALF	Question	X mark	Lead
Areópago Genuina 26/UNED	20 Oct–10 Nov 2025	1,511	33.1	23.7	17.5	6.8	7.3	1.1	0.7	0.5	–	–	5.0	1.8	9.4
CIS	7–31 Mar 2025	397	21.7	15.9	12.7	0.6	10.0	1.4	1.0	–	1.0	0.7	27.0	4.7	5.8
Ágora Integral/UNED	1–17 Nov 2024	1,504	26.0	19.2	17.7	7.9	5.6	4.1	1.1	0.4	–	–	8.0	5.2	6.8
2024 EP election (Note: Does not include non-resident citizens.)	9 Jun 2024	—N/a	12.4	4.1	11.9		4.9	1.4	–	–	1.6	2.6	—N/a	59.3	0.5
2023 general election	23 Jul 2023	—N/a	21.0	7.1	19.1	2.8	4.8			–	6.6	–	—N/a	36.4	1.9
2023 regional election	28 May 2023	—N/a	15.2	12.3	10.9	4.5	4.4	2.2	1.8	0.4	–	–	—N/a	42.8	2.9

=== Preferred President ===
The table below lists opinion polling on leader preferences to become president of the Canary Islands.

Polling firm/Commissioner	Fieldwork date	Sample size								Other/ None/ Not care	Question	Lead
Polling firm/Commissioner	Fieldwork date	Sample size	Torres PSOE	Clavijo CCa	Dávila CCa	Domínguez PP	Rodríguez NCa	Galván Vox	Curbelo ASG	Other/ None/ Not care	Question	Lead
GCEMOP/Atlántico Hoy	19–25 May 2026	1,639	19.8	18.3	–	4.6	3.0	0.7	6.3	31.5	16.0	1.5
CIS (Note: Responses denoting a party's generic candidate are aggregated to that party's main candidate/leader at the time of the poll.)	7–31 Mar 2025	397	13.6	13.4	0.7	3.8	–	6.0	–	6.5	56.1	0.2

== Bibliography ==
- Ley Orgánica 5/1985, de 19 de junio, del Régimen Electoral General (Organic Law 5/1985). Official State Gazette (in Spanish). 19 June 1985 [version as of 2 July 2026]. BOE-A-1985-11672.
- Ley Orgánica 1/2018, de 5 de noviembre, de reforma del Estatuto de Autonomía de Canarias (Organic Law 1/2018). Official State Gazette (in Spanish). 5 November 2018 [version as of 28 December 2022]. BOE-A-2018-15138.
- Ley 1/2022, de 11 de mayo, de Elecciones al Parlamento de Canarias (Law 1/2022). Official State Gazette (in Spanish). 11 May 2022 [version as of 23 May 2022]. BOE-A-2022-10043.
- Ley 4/2023, de 23 de marzo, de la Presidencia y del Gobierno de Canarias (Law 4/2023). Official State Gazette (in Spanish). 23 March 2023 [version as of 30 December 2024]. BOE-A-2023-12668.
