= 2023 Canarian regional election =

Election in the Spanish region of the Canary Islands

- 28 May 2023

All 70 seats in the Parliament of the Canary Islands 36 seats needed for a majority
- Opinion polls
- Registered: Island: 1,788,412 ▲4.0% Regional: 1,788,706 ▲3.9%
- Turnout: Island: 929,913 (52.0%) ▼0.6 pp Regional: 928,585 (51.9%) ▼0.6 pp
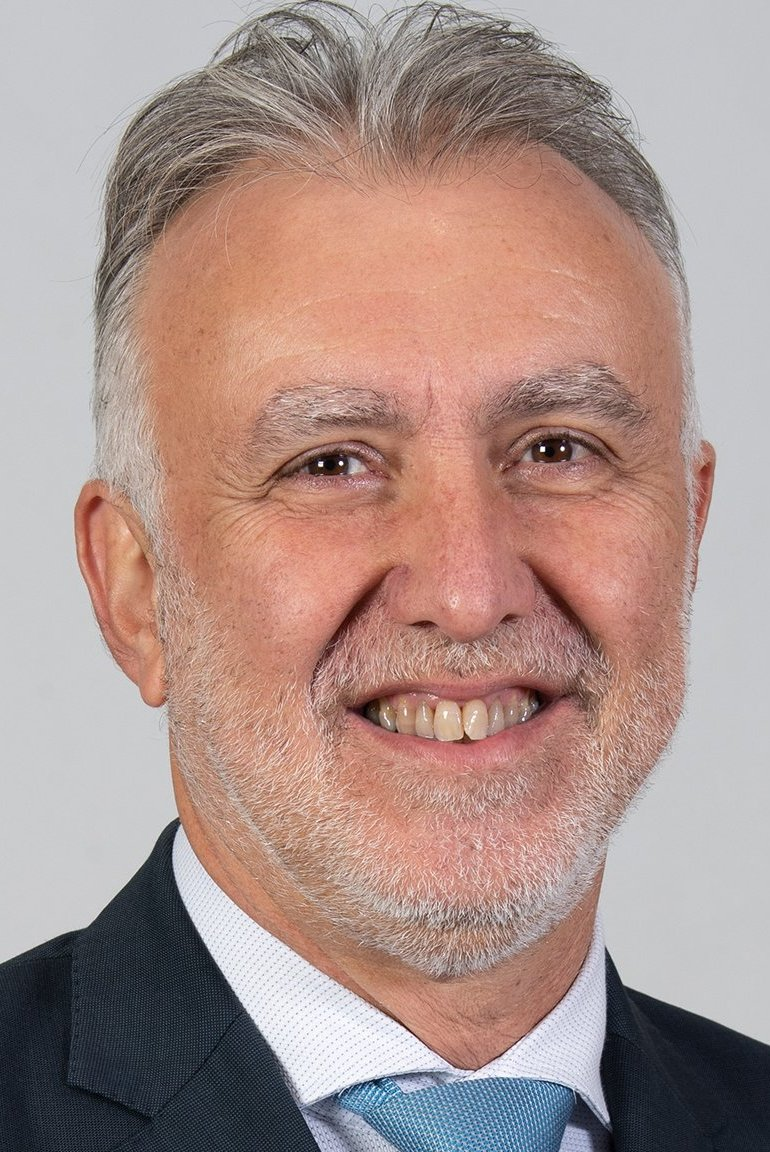

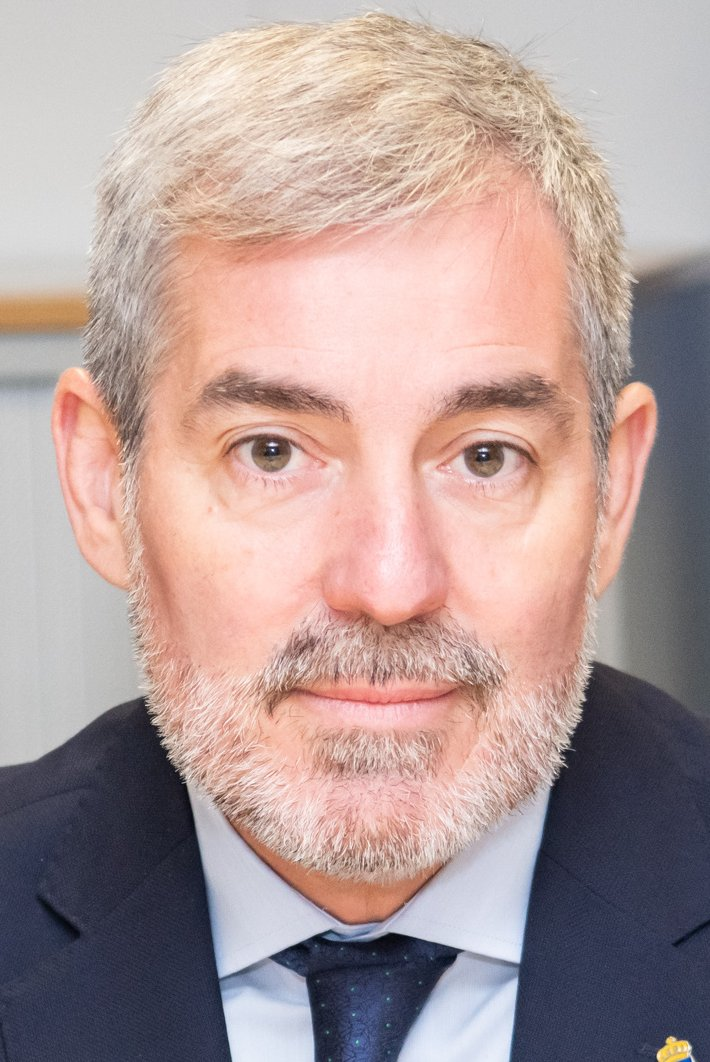

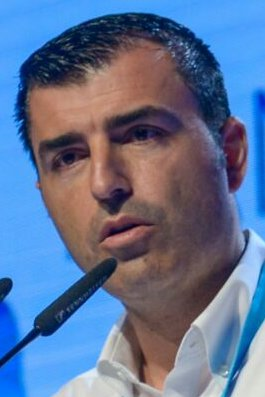

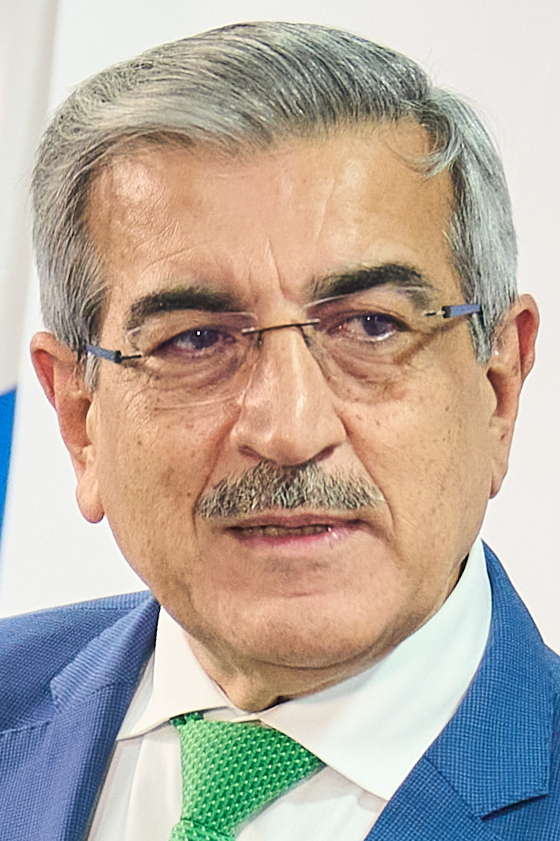

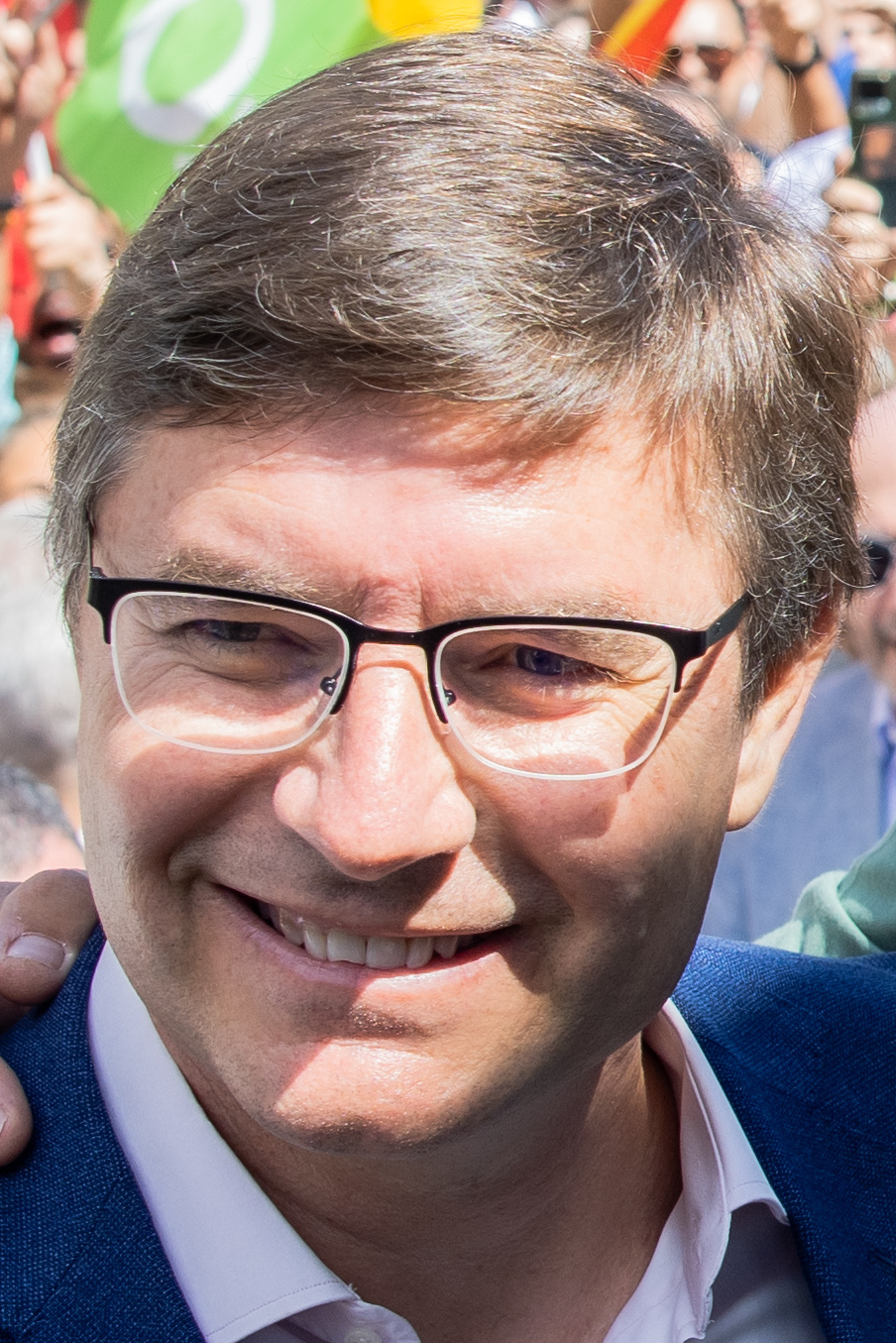

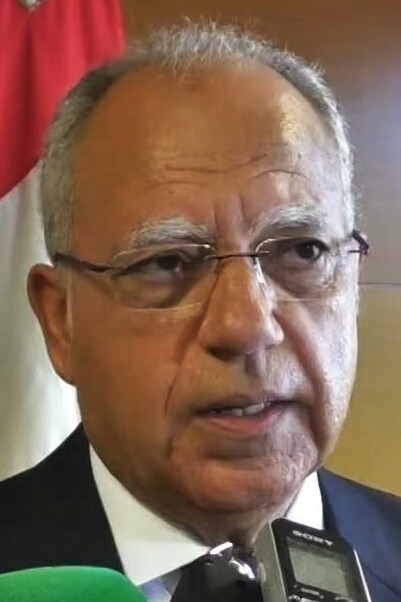

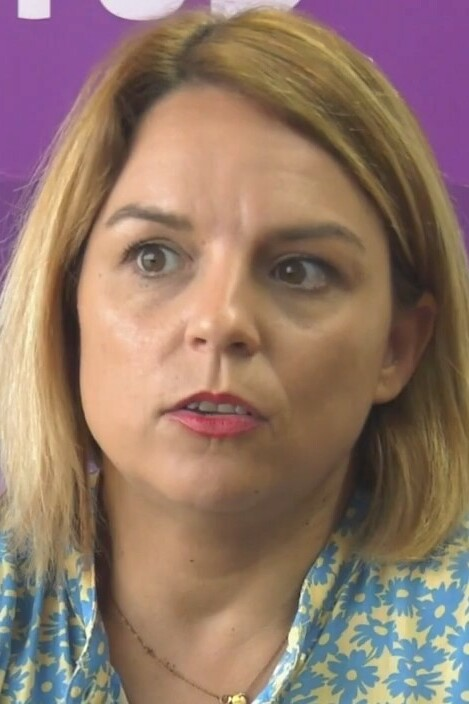

	First party	Second party	Third party
Leader	Ángel Víctor Torres	Fernando Clavijo	Manuel Domínguez
Party	PSOE	CCa	PP
Leader since	23 July 2017	12 September 2014	23 January 2022
Leader's seat	Regional	Regional	Regional
Last election	25 seats, 28.9%	19 seats, 21.7% (Note: Results for CCa–PNC in the 2019 election, not including El Hierro.)	11 seats, 15.2%
Seats won	23	19	15
Seat change	▼2	0	▲4
Island vote	247,811	201,401	176,308
Island %	27.2%	22.1%	19.3%
Island swing	▼1.7 pp	▲0.4 pp	▲4.1 pp
	Fourth party	Fifth party	Sixth party
Leader	Román Rodríguez	Nicasio Galván	Casimiro Curbelo
Party	NC–BC	Vox	ASG
Leader since	26 February 2005	29 December 2022	6 March 2015
Leader's seat	Regional (lost)	Gran Canaria	La Gomera
Last election	5 seats, 9.0% (Note: Results for NCa in the 2019 election, not including El Hierro.)	0 seats, 2.5%	3 seats, 0.7%
Seats won	5	4	3
Seat change	0	▲4	0
Island vote	72,372	71,740	6,765
Island %	7.9%	7.9%	0.7%
Island swing	▼1.1 pp	▲5.4 pp	0.0 pp
	Seventh party	Eighth party	Ninth party
Leader	Raúl Acosta	Noemí Santana	Isabel Bello
Party	AHI	Podemos–IUC–SSP	CS
Leader since	15 April 2023	1 April 2015	2 March 2019
Leader's seat	El Hierro	Gran Canaria (lost)	Tenerife (lost)
Last election	1 seat, 0.3% (Note: Results for CCa–PNC and NC–BC in El Hierro in the 2019 election.)	4 seats, 9.8% (Note: Results for Podemos–SSP–Equo (8.8%, 4 seats) and IUC (1.0%, 0 seats) in the 2019 election.)	2 seats, 7.4%
Seats won	1	0	0
Seat change	0	▼4	▼2
Island vote	1,660	35,777	3,510
Island %	0.2%	3.9%	0.4%
Island swing	▼0.1 pp	▼5.9 pp	▼7.0 pp
President before election
Ángel Víctor Torres
PSOE
President after election
Fernando Clavijo
CCa

A regional election was held in the Canary Islands on 28 May 2023 to elect the 11th Parliament of the autonomous community. All 70 seats in the Parliament were up for election. It was held concurrently with regional elections in eleven other autonomous communities and local elections all across Spain.

== Overview ==
Under the 2018 Statute of Autonomy, the Parliament of the Canary Islands was the unicameral legislature of the homonymous autonomous community, having legislative power in devolved matters, as well as the ability to grant or withdraw confidence from a regional president. The electoral and procedural rules were supplemented by national law provisions.

=== Date ===
The term of the Parliament of the Canary Islands expired four years after the date of its previous election. Amendments in 2018 and 2022 abolished fixed-term elections, instead allowing the term of the Parliament to expire after an early dissolution. The election decree was required to be issued no later than 25 days before the scheduled expiration date of parliament and published on the following day in the Official Gazette of the Canaries (BOC), with election day taking place 54 days after the decree's publication. The previous election was held on 26 May 2019, which meant that the chamber's term would have expired on 26 May 2023. The election decree was required to be published in the BOC no later than 2 May 2023, setting the latest possible date for election day on 25 June 2023.

The regional president had the prerogative to dissolve the Parliament of the Canary Islands at any given time and call a snap election, provided that no motion of no confidence was in process and that dissolution did not occur before one year after a previous one. In the event of an investiture process failing to elect a regional president within a two-month period from the Parliament's reconvening, the chamber was to be automatically dissolved and a fresh election called.

The Parliament of the Canary Islands was officially dissolved on 4 April 2023 with the publication of the corresponding decree in the BOC, setting election day for 28 May and scheduling for the chamber to reconvene on 27 June.

=== Electoral system ===
Voting for the Parliament was based on universal suffrage, comprising all Spanish nationals over 18 years of age, registered in the Canary Islands and with full political rights, provided that they had not been deprived of the right to vote by a final sentence. Amendments in 2022 abolished the "begged" voting system (Spanish: Voto rogado), under which non-resident citizens were required to apply for voting. The begged vote system was attributed responsibility for a major decrease in the turnout of Spaniards abroad during the years it was in force.

The Parliament of the Canary Islands had a minimum of 50 and a maximum of 75 seats, with electoral provisions fixing its size at 70. All were elected in eight multi-member constituencies—corresponding to the islands of El Hierro, Fuerteventura, Gran Canaria, La Gomera, La Palma, Lanzarote and Tenerife, as well as an additional constituency comprising the whole archipelago, each of which was assigned a fixed number of seats—using the D'Hondt method and closed-list proportional voting, with a 15 percent-threshold of valid votes (including blank ballots) in each constituency or four percent regionally.

As a result of the aforementioned allocation, each Parliament constituency was entitled the following seats:

Seats	Constituencies
15	Gran Canaria, Tenerife
9	Regional
8	Fuerteventura, La Palma, Lanzarote
4	La Gomera
3	El Hierro

The law did not provide for by-elections to fill vacant seats; instead, any vacancies arising after the proclamation of candidates and during the legislative term were filled by the next candidates on the party lists or, when required, by designated substitutes.

=== Outgoing parliament ===
The table below shows the composition of the parliamentary groups in the chamber at the time of dissolution.

Parliamentary composition in April 2023
Groups	Parties	Legislators	
Groups	Parties	Seats	Total
Canarian Socialist Parliamentary Group	PSOE	25	25
Canarian Nationalist Parliamentary Group (CC–PNC–AHI)	CCa	17	20
Canarian Nationalist Parliamentary Group (CC–PNC–AHI)	UxGC	1	20
Canarian Nationalist Parliamentary Group (CC–PNC–AHI)	PNC	1	20
Canarian Nationalist Parliamentary Group (CC–PNC–AHI)	AHI	1	20
People's Parliamentary Group	PP	11	11
New Canaries Parliamentary Group (NC)	NC–BC	4	4
Yes We Can Canaries Parliamentary Group	Podemos	3	4
Yes We Can Canaries Parliamentary Group	SSP	1	4
Gomera Socialist Group Parliamentary Group (ASG)	ASG	3	3
Mixed Parliamentary Group	CS	1	2
Mixed Parliamentary Group	INDEP	1 (Note: Vidina Espino, former CS legislator.)	2
Non-Inscrits	AMF	1	1

== Parties and candidates ==
The electoral law allowed for parties and federations registered in the interior ministry, alliances and groupings of electors to present lists of candidates. Parties and federations intending to form an alliance were required to inform the relevant electoral commission within 10 days of the election call, whereas groupings of electors needed to secure the signature of at least one percent of the electorate in the constituencies for which they sought election, disallowing electors from signing for more than one list. Additionally, a balanced composition of men and women was required in the electoral lists, so that candidates of either sex made up at least 40 percent of the total composition.

Below is a list of the main parties and alliances which contested the election:

Candidacy	Parties and alliances	Candidate	Ideology	Previous result		Gov.	Ref.
Candidacy	Parties and alliances	Candidate	Ideology	Vote %	Seats	Gov.	Ref.
PSOE	List: Spanish Socialist Workers' Party (PSOE)	Ángel Víctor Torres	Social democracy	28.9%	25	Yes	
CCa	List: Canarian Coalition (CCa)	Fernando Clavijo	Regionalism; Canarian nationalism Centrism	21.7%	19	No	
PP	List: People's Party (PP)	Manuel Domínguez	Conservatism; Christian democracy	15.2%	11	No	
Podemos– IUC–SSP	List: We Can (Podemos); Canarian United Left (IUC); Yes We Can (SSP)	Noemí Santana	Left-wing populism Direct democracy Democratic socialism	9.8%	4	Yes	
NC–BC	List: New Canaries–Canarian Bloc (NC–BC)	Román Rodríguez	Canarian nationalism Social democracy	9.0%	5	Yes	
CS	List: Citizens–Party of the Citizenry (CS)	Isabel Bello	Liberalism	7.4%	2	No	
Vox	List: Vox (Vox)	Nicasio Galván	Right-wing populism Ultranationalism; National conservatism	2.5%	0	No	
ASG	List: Gomera Socialist Group (ASG)	Casimiro Curbelo	Insularism; Social democracy	0.7%	3	Yes	
AHI	List: Independent Herrenian Group (AHI); Canarian Coalition (CCa) (Note: In El Hierro.); New Canaries–Canarian Bloc (NC–BC); Frontera Union (UF)	Raúl Acosta	Insularism; Canarian nationalism Centrism	0.3%	1	No	
UxGC	List: United for Gran Canaria (UxGC)	Lucas Bravo de Laguna	Regionalism; Liberalism; Centrism	Contested in alliance (Note: UxGC (1 seat) contested the 2019 election in alliance with CCa–PNC.)		No	
PNC	List: Canarian Nationalist Party (PNC)	Francisco Martín	Canarian nationalism Centrism	Contested in alliance (Note: PNC (1 seat) contested the 2019 election in alliance with CCa–PNC.)		No	

== Campaign ==
=== Debates ===
2023 Canarian regional election debates
Date	Organizer(s)	Moderator(s)	P Present (Note: Denotes a main invitee attending the event.) S Surrogate (Note: Denotes a main invitee not attending the event, sending a surrogate in their place.) NI Not invited A Absent invitee									
Date	Organizer(s)	Moderator(s)	PSOE	CCa	PP	USP	NC–BC	CS	ASG	DVC	Audience	Ref.
12 May	Cadena SER	Eric Pestano	P Torres	P Clavijo	P Domínguez	P Santana	P Rodríguez	P Bello	P Curbelo	P A. Rodríguez	—	
23 May	RTVE	Fátima Hernández; Marta Modino	P Torres	P Clavijo	P Domínguez	P Santana	P Rodríguez	NI	A	NI	13.8% (88,000) (Note: In the Canary Islands, the debate was broadcast on RTVC (5.9%, 37,000), La 1 (6.2%, 40,000) and 24 Horas (1.7%, 11,000). Nationwide, the debate was broadcast on 24 Horas, obtaining an audience of 0.4% (46,000).)	

== Opinion polls ==
The tables below list opinion polling results in reverse chronological order, showing the most recent first and using the dates when the survey fieldwork was done, as opposed to the date of publication. Where the fieldwork dates are unknown, the date of publication is given instead. The highest percentage figure in each polling survey is displayed with its background shaded in the leading party's colour. If a tie ensues, this is applied to the figures with the highest percentages. The "Lead" column on the right shows the percentage-point difference between the parties with the highest percentages in a poll.

=== Graphical summary ===
Local regression trend line of poll results from 26 May 2019 to 28 May 2023, with each line corresponding to a political party.

=== Voting intention estimates ===
The table below lists weighted voting intention estimates. Refusals are generally excluded from the party vote percentages, while question wording and the treatment of "don't know" responses and those not intending to vote may vary between polling organisations. When available, seat projections determined by the polling organisations are displayed below (or in place of) the percentages in a smaller font; 36 seats were required for an absolute majority in the Parliament of the Canary Islands.

Color key:

Poll conducted after legal ban on opinion polls

Polling firm/Commissioner	Fieldwork date	Sample size	Turnout	PSOE	CCa	PP	NCa	Podemos	CS	Vox	IUC	ASG	UxGC	AHI	USP	DVC	Lead
2023 regional election	28 May 2023	—N/a	52.0	27.2; 23	22.1; 19	19.3; 15	7.9; 5	(Note: Within Unidas Podemos.)	0.4; 0	7.9; 4		0.7; 3	1.9; 0	0.2; 1	3.9; 0	3.2; 0	5.1
Sigma Dos/RTVE–FORTA	28 May 2023	1,300	?	31.1; 23/25	21.8; 18/19	19.6; 15/16	8.0; 3/4		–	6.7; 2		0.8; 3	–	? 1	? 2	–	9.3
NC Report/La Razón	22 May 2023	?	?	28.3; 24/25	20.1; 16/17	23.2; 18/19	7.8; 4/5		–	3.7; 0/2		0.8; 3	–	(Note: Within CCa.)	8.1; 3/4	–	5.1
KeyData/Público	19 May 2023	?	58.2	30.0; 25	20.3; 17	21.6; 17	7.5; 3		1.0; 0	5.4; 1		0.7; 3	–	? 1	7.3; 3	1.9; 0	8.4
Ágora Integral/Canarias Ahora	14–18 May 2023	2,000	?	28.4; 24/25	19.2; 15/17	22.8; 17/18	9.5; 5		0.7; 0	4.6; 0/1		0.7; 3	2.9; 0	0.2; 1	6.6; 2	1.8; 0	5.6
Perfiles/La Provincia	12–18 May 2023	2,400	50	24.0– 25.0; 23/24	21.0– 22.0; 20/22	17.0– 18.0; 14/16	7.0– 8.0; 4/5		–	5.0– 6.0; 2/3		0.7; 3	–		4.0– 5.0; 1/2	3.0– 4.0; 0	3.0
TSA/Canarias7	1–18 May 2023	2,514	?	30.2; 24/26	18.9; 14/16	19.1; 15/17	10.8; 5/7		1.6; 0	2.7; 0		0.7; 3	–	0.2; 1	7.8; 3	–	11.1
EM-Analytics/El Plural	11–17 May 2023	600	?	28.8; 24	20.1; 15	21.5; 18	8.0; 5		1.3; 0	4.3; 1		0.7; 3	2.7; 0	0.3; 1	7.7; 3	2.8; 0	7.3
EM-Analytics/GMG	14 Apr–16 May 2023	8,604	?	28.6; 24	19.7; 15	21.5; 18	7.9; 5		1.3; 0	4.3; 1		0.7; 3	2.9; 0	0.3; 1	7.6; 3	3.1; 0	7.1
Data10/Okdiario	12–15 May 2023	1,500	?	27.9; 24	21.7; 17	22.9; 17	7.9; 5		1.9; 0	4.9; 1		0.7; 3	–	0.3; 1	7.1; 2	–	5.0
EM-Analytics/El Plural	4–10 May 2023	600	?	28.8; 24	20.0; 15	21.7; 18	8.0; 5		1.3; 0	4.2; 1		0.7; 3	2.8; 0	0.3; 1	7.7; 3	2.8; 0	7.1
EM-Analytics/El Plural	26 Apr–3 May 2023	600	?	28.9; 24	19.9; 15	21.5; 18	8.0; 5		1.3; 0	4.2; 1		0.7; 3	2.9; 0	0.3; 1	7.7; 3	2.8; 0	7.4
Simple Lógica/elDiario.es	20–28 Apr 2023	828	?	27.5; 24/26	18.9; 15/16	19.0; 14/15	9.0; 4		0.5; 0	5.6; 2		0.7; 3	2.0; 0	0.2; 1/2	9.6; 4/5	3.2; 0	8.5
CIS	10–26 Apr 2023	818	?	33.0	15.7	20.0	5.9		1.2	5.8		–	–	–	9.8	3.0	13.0
EM-Analytics/El Plural	19–25 Apr 2023	600	?	28.9; 25	19.8; 16	21.9; 18	8.0; 5		? 0	? 0		0.7; 3	? 0		7.7; 3	2.9; 0	7.0
Ágora Integral/Canarias Ahora	5–23 Apr 2023	3,000	?	28.1; 24/26	19.9; 16/17	22.4; 17/18	9.1; 5		0.7; 0	3.1; 0		0.7; 3	2.9; 0	0.2; 1	6.9; 2	3.0; 0	5.7
TSA/Canarias7	3–19 Apr 2023	2,598	?	31.2; 24/29	19.0; 16/19	17.3; 11/16	11.4; 5/8		1.9; 0	2.5; 0		0.7; 3	–	? 1	6.8; 2/3	2.9; 0	12.2
EM-Analytics/El Plural	12–18 Apr 2023	600	?	29.2; 24	19.7; 16	21.6; 18	8.2; 5		1.3; 0	4.4; 1		0.6; 3	3.7; 0		7.9; 3	2.1; 0	7.6
GAD3/Tiempo de Canarias	30 Mar–18 Apr 2023	2,009	?	33.2; 26/27	17.8; 15/16	20.2; 16	7.1; 2/3		0.3; 0	7.1; 3/4		0.5; 3	2.0; 0	0.3; 1	5.5; 2	1.0; 0	13.0
EM-Analytics/GMG	8 Mar–14 Apr 2023	7,813	?	28.8; 25	19.2; 16	20.5; 17	8.5; 5		1.4; 0	4.8; 1		0.6; 3	3.8; 0		8.3; 3	2.4; 0	8.3
Data10/Okdiario	10–13 Apr 2023	1,500	?	26.7; 22	22.9; 20	23.3; 17	7.8; 5		1.7; 0	4.1; 0		0.7; 3	–		7.5; 3	–	3.4
EM-Analytics/El Plural	5–11 Apr 2023	600	?	28.7; 25	19.8; 16	20.7; 18	8.5; 5		1.6; 0	4.0; 0		0.5; 3	3.9; 0		7.5; 3	2.6; 0	8.0
EM-Analytics/El Plural	27 Mar–4 Apr 2023	600	?	29.8; 24	20.7; 18	21.5; 17	8.2; 5		1.5; 0	4.4; 0		0.6; 3	–		7.9; 3	3.0; 0	8.3
22Grados/Tiempo de Canarias	15–31 Mar 2023	2,690	?	32.4; 27/30	21.3; 17/19	17.6; 13/15	6.5; 3/4		2.1; 0	7.0; 0/2		0.8; 3	–	0.2; 0	6.9; 2/3	–	11.1
EM-Analytics/GMG	5 Feb–8 Mar 2023	6,880	?	29.9; 24	20.6; 18	20.4; 17	8.5; 5		1.7; 0	4.8; 0		0.7; 3	–		8.4; 3	2.8; 0	9.3
NC Report/La Razón	27 Feb–3 Mar 2023	?	49.5	27.2; 23	22.5; 18	24.9; 18	7.5; 4		–	–		0.8; 3	–		8.4; 4	–	2.3
EM-Analytics/GMG	6 Jan–4 Feb 2023	6,065	?	32.0; 25	20.5; 17	17.7; 15	8.1; 5		1.8; 0	5.4; 1		0.9; 3	–		8.8; 4	2.0; 0	11.5
Sigma Dos/El Mundo	13–19 Jan 2023	910	?	33.8; 26/27	19.2; 16	23.8; 18	4.7; 1		1.6; 0	6.7; 2/3		0.7; 3	–		7.0; 2/3	–	10.0
EM-Analytics/GMG	11 Dec–5 Jan 2023	5,375	?	32.6; 27	20.9; 19	17.5; 12	8.1; 3		1.8; 0	5.5; 2		0.8; 3	–		9.1; 4	–	11.7
EM-Analytics/GMG	22 Nov–11 Dec 2022	4,474	?	32.7; 26	21.1; 19	16.8; 12	8.2; 4		1.7; 0	5.5; 2		0.8; 3	–		9.5; 4	–	11.6
CIS (Note: Vote+Simpathy figures with undecided and/or abstentionists excluded.)	17 Nov–2 Dec 2022	502	?	40.9	11.8	18.8	3.5		0.9	4.6		0.3	–		10.3	–	22.1
EM-Analytics/GMG	23 Oct–21 Nov 2022	3,661	?	32.7; 27	20.8; 19	17.1; 12	8.0; 3		1.7; 0	5.6; 2		0.8; 3	–		9.6; 4	–	11.9
Hamalgama Métrica/UNED	10 Oct–4 Nov 2022	3,201	?	31.5; 27/30	18.5; 15/18	18.5; 14/16	11.4; 5/7		2.0; 0	3.7; 0		0.7; 3	1.7; 0		7.3; 2	–	13.0
EM-Analytics/GMG	11 Sep–22 Oct 2022	2,868	?	32.2; 25	20.4; 18	17.3; 13	8.4; 5		1.8; 0	5.7; 2		0.9; 3	–		9.4; 4	–	11.8
EM-Analytics/GMG	10 Aug–10 Sep 2022	2,365	?	32.8; 26	19.7; 16	17.1; 14	8.8; 5		1.9; 0	5.7; 2		0.8; 3	–		9.4; 4	–	13.1
EM-Analytics/GMG	19 Jul–10 Aug 2022	?	?	32.1; 25	19.9; 17	16.9; 13	9.0; 5		1.8; 0	6.0; 3		0.8; 3	–		9.5; 4	–	12.2
EM-Analytics/GMG	16 Jun–19 Jul 2022	?	?	31.8; 25	19.7; 17	16.8; 13	9.3; 5		1.9; 0	6.2; 3		0.8; 3	–		9.6; 4	–	12.1
Hamalgama Métrica/UNED	10–30 Jun 2022	3,185	?	34.5; 27/33	16.8; 13/19	17.2; 10/16	11.5; 5/6		2.4; 0	4.3; 0		0.7; 3	1.9; 0		6.5; 2	–	17.3
EM-Analytics/GMG	19 May–13 Jun 2022	1,427	?	32.1; 26	19.4; 16	16.4; 12	9.4; 5		2.0; 0	6.3; 3		0.9; 3	–		9.6; 5	–	12.7
EM-Analytics/GMG	2–19 May 2022	1,100	?	32.2; 26	19.6; 17	16.6; 12	9.0; 5		2.0; 0	6.0; 3		1.0; 3	–		9.5; 4	–	12.6
TSA/Canarias7 (Note: "El PSOE mejora en todas las islas a costa del terreno que ceden los nacionalistas". Canarias7 (in Spanish). 3 April 2022.)	21 Feb–23 Mar 2022	3,402	?	33.5; 27/30	17.2; 13/17	15.2; 11/14	11.6; 6/8	7.2; 2/3	–	4.8; 0/2	–	0.7; 3	–		–	–	16.3
Hamalgama Métrica/UNED	1–26 Nov 2021	3,170	?	34.5; 28/33	18.3; 13/16	17.8; 13/16	9.7; 4/6		2.6; 0	5.4; 1/2		0.8; 3			6.6; 3	–	16.2
EM-Analytics/Electomanía	16 Jun–23 Jul 2021	?	?	33.1; 28	18.8; 15	19.0; 15	9.7; 5		2.2; 0	5.3; 2		0.7; 3			6.1; 2	–	14.1
Hamalgama Métrica/UNED	1–19 Feb 2021	1,500	?	34.4	17.4	16.1	9.2	9.6	4.5	5.0	–	0.7			–	–	17.0
Ágora Integral	7 Feb 2021	5,850	?	? 25/26	? 18/19	? 10/12	? 5	? 4	? 0/2	? 2	–	? 3			–	–	?
SyM Consulting	13–17 Jan 2021	3,851	55.2	26.9; 22	21.5; 19/24	15.7; 9/14	8.3; 5/6	8.1; 2/3	4.9; 0/3	7.9; 3	–	0.7; 2/3			–	–	5.4
ElectoPanel/Electomanía	15 Dec 2020	850	?	32.0; 27	19.8; 18	16.4; 12	9.6; 5		4.9; 1	5.2; 2		0.7; 3			6.7; 2	–	12.2
ElectoPanel/Electomanía	31 Oct 2020	850	?	32.4; 28	19.9; 19	16.2; 12	9.6; 5		4.6; 1	4.4; 0		0.7; 3			6.9; 2	–	12.5
ElectoPanel/Electomanía	1 Apr–15 May 2020	?	?	31.8; 27	19.7; 18	16.7; 14	9.1; 5		4.6; 1	3.5; 0		0.7; 3			7.5; 2	–	12.1
November 2019 general election	10 Nov 2019	—N/a	55.4	28.9	13.1	20.8			5.4	12.5		–			14.7	–	8.1
2019 regional election	26 May 2019	—N/a	52.6	28.9; 25	21.9; 20	15.2; 11	9.0; 5	8.8; 4	7.4; 2	2.5; 0	1.0; 0	0.7; 3			–	–	7.0

=== Voting preferences ===
The table below lists raw, unweighted voting preferences.

Polling firm/Commissioner	Fieldwork date	Sample size	PSOE	CCa	PP	NCa	Podemos	CS	Vox	IUC	ASG	USP	DVC	Question	X mark	Lead
2023 regional election (Note: Does not include non-resident citizens.)	28 May 2023	—N/a	15.2	12.3	10.9	4.5		0.2	4.4		0.4	2.2	1.8	—N/a	42.8	2.9
CIS	10–26 Apr 2023	818	23.3	9.5	12.7	3.4		0.4	4.8		–	5.5	2.0	30.3	3.1	10.6
CIS	17 Nov–2 Dec 2022	502	26.2	6.8	12.4	2.7		0.6	2.9		0.0	6.0	–	33.1	3.3	13.8
Hamalgama Métrica/UNED	10 Oct–4 Nov 2022	3,201	32.2	15.5	17.9	7.9		0.4	3.2		0.6	7.0	–	10.7	4.0	14.3
Hamalgama Métrica/UNED	10–30 Jun 2022	3,185	36.6	14.8	15.3	5.4		0.4	2.1		0.5	5.9	–	14.3	4.3	21.3
Hamalgama Métrica/UNED	1–26 Nov 2021	3,170	31.3	12.2	17.1	5.4		0.4	4.5		0.6	5.4	–	15.9	5.3	14.2
Hamalgama Métrica/UNED	1–19 Feb 2021	1,500	25.0	12.5	14.7	4.4		1.6	3.2		0.5	6.1	–	23.4	7.2	10.3
November 2019 general election	10 Nov 2019	—N/a	17.3	7.9	12.4			3.2	7.5		–	8.8	–	—N/a	39.5	4.9
2019 regional election	26 May 2019	—N/a	16.4	12.4	8.6	5.1	5.0	4.2	1.4	0.6	0.4	–	–	—N/a	42.6	4.0

== Results ==
=== Overall ===
← Summary of the 28 May 2023 Parliament of the Canary Islands election results →
Parties and alliances	Island constituencies			Regional constituency			Seats	
Parties and alliances	Votes	%	±pp	Votes	%	±pp	Total	+/−
Spanish Socialist Workers' Party (PSOE)	247,811	27.17	−1.71	295,969	32.43	+2.90	23	−2
Canarian Coalition (CCa)^{1}	201,401	22.08	+0.15	175,198	19.20	−4.17	19	±0
People's Party (PP)	176,308	19.33	+4.15	183,761	20.13	+5.53	15	+4
New Canaries–Canarian Bloc (NC–BC)^{2}	72,372	7.93	−1.08	65,028	7.13	−2.14	5	±0
Vox (Vox)	71,740	7.86	+5.39	71,887	7.88	+5.40	4	+4
United Yes We Can (Podemos–IUC–SSP)^{3}	35,777	3.92	−5.88	29,556	3.24	−6.26	0	−4
Drago Greens Canaries (DVC)	28,899	3.17	New	30,392	3.33	New	0	±0
United for Gran Canaria (UxGC)	17,153	1.88	New	13,760	1.51	New	0	±0
Animalist Party with the Environment (PACMA)^{4}	11,190	1.23	+0.11	11,803	1.29	−0.07	0	±0
Gomera Socialist Group (ASG)	6,765	0.74	+0.04	—	—	—	3	±0
Let's Talk Now (Hablemos Ahora)	4,030	0.44	New	—	—	—	0	±0
Citizens–Party of the Citizenry (CS)	3,510	0.38	−6.98	3,548	0.39	−6.55	0	−2
Municipal Assemblies of Fuerteventura (AMF)	2,840	0.31	New	3,108	0.34	New	0	±0
Canarian Nationalist Party (PNC)	2,395	0.26	New	2,417	0.26	New	0	±0
Gather Sustainable Canaries (Reunir)	2,312	0.25	New	1,998	0.22	New	0	±0
Canaries Now–Communist Party of the Canarian People (ANC–UP–PCPC)^{5}	2,106	0.23	−0.16	2,156	0.24	−0.24	0	±0
Seniors in Action (3e)	1,898	0.21	+0.11	—	—	—	0	±0
Independent Herrenian Group (AHI)^{6}	1,660	0.18	−0.11	—	—	—	1	±0
More Canaries (+C)	1,476	0.16	New	2,354	0.26	New	0	±0
Initiative for La Gomera (IxLG)	1,312	0.14	New	—	—	—	0	±0
Herrenian Assembly (AH)	1,089	0.12	New	—	—	—	0	±0
Electoral Alternative Movement (MAE)	778	0.09	New	—	—	—	0	±0
With You, We Are Democracy (Contigo)	732	0.08	−0.03	—	—	—	0	±0
Democratic Union of the Canary Islands (UDC)	718	0.08	+0.02	—	—	—	0	±0
Now You (Ahora Tú)	—	—	—	3,846	0.42	New	0	±0
Country with Managers (País con Gestores)	—	—	—	1,210	0.13	New	0	±0
Blank ballots	15,947	1.75	+0.51	14,654	1.61	+0.37		
Total	912,219			912,645			70	±0
Valid votes	912,219	98.10	−0.78	912,645	98.28	−0.70		
Invalid votes	17,694	1.90	+0.78	15,940	1.72	+0.70		
Votes cast / turnout	929,913	52.00	−0.59	928,585	51.91	−0.63		
Abstentions	858,499	48.00	+0.59	860,121	48.09	+0.63		
Registered voters	1,788,412			1,788,706				
Sources
Footnotes: ^{1} Canarian Coalition results are compared to Canarian Coalition–Canarian Nationalist Party totals in the 2019 election, not including results in El Hierro.; ^{2} New Canaries–Canarian Bloc does not include results in El Hierro.; ^{3} United Yes We Can results are compared to the combined totals of Yes We Can Canaries and Canarian United Left in the 2019 election.; ^{4} Animalist Party with the Environment results are compared to Animalist Party Against Mistreatment of Animals totals in the 2019 election.; ^{5} Canaries Now–Communist Party of the Canarian People results are compared to the combined totals of Canaries Now and Communist Party of the Canarian People in the 2019 election.; ^{6} Independent Herrenian Group results are compared to Canarian Coalition–Canarian Nationalist Party and New Canaries totals in El Hierro in the 2019 election.

Popular vote (island constituencies)
PSOE	27.17%
CCa	22.08%
PP	19.33%
NC–BC	7.93%
Vox	7.86%
USP	3.92%
DVC	3.17%
UxGC	1.88%
PACMA	1.23%
ASG	0.74%
AHI	0.18%
Others	2.75%
Blank ballots	1.75%

Popular vote (regional constituency)
PSOE	32.43%
PP	20.13%
CCa	19.20%
Vox	7.88%
NC–BC	7.13%
DVC	3.33%
USP	3.24%
UxGC	1.51%
PACMA	1.29%
Others	2.26%
Blank ballots	1.61%

Seats
PSOE	32.86%
CCa	27.14%
PP	21.43%
NC–BC	7.14%
Vox	5.71%
ASG	4.29%
AHI	1.43%

=== Distribution by constituency ===
Constituency	PSOE		CCa		PP		NC–BC		Vox		ASG		AHI	
Constituency	%	S	%	S	%	S	%	S	%	S	%	S	%	S
El Hierro	26.5	1			20.2	1			1.6	−			26.3	1
Fuerteventura	21.4	2	25.7	3	19.2	2	10.8	1	6.0	−				
Gran Canaria	28.1	5	9.5	1	21.3	4	14.5	3	9.9	2				
La Gomera	17.9	1	9.3	−	4.5	−			2.0	−	54.7	3		
La Palma	23.9	2	42.4	4	20.0	2	3.0	−	3.0	−				
Lanzarote	29.0	3	27.3	3	17.2	1	8.8	1	6.9	−				
Tenerife	27.3	5	31.3	6	18.1	3	2.4	−	7.1	1				
Regional	32.4	4	19.2	2	20.1	2	7.1	−	7.9	1				
Total	27.2	23	22.1	19	19.3	15	7.9	5	7.9	4	0.7	3	0.2	1

== Aftermath ==
=== Government formation ===
Investiture; Nomination of Fernando Clavijo (CCa)
Ballot →	12 July 2023
Required majority →	36 out of 70
Yes: • CCa (19); • PP (15); • ASG (3); • AHI (1)	38 / 70
No: • PSOE (23); • NC–BC (5); • Vox (4)	32 / 70
Abstentions	0 / 70
Absentees	0 / 70

== Bibliography ==
- Ley Orgánica 5/1985, de 19 de junio, del Régimen Electoral General (Organic Law 5/1985). Official State Gazette (in Spanish). 19 June 1985 [version as of 3 October 2022]. BOE-A-1985-11672.
- Ley Orgánica 1/2018, de 5 de noviembre, de reforma del Estatuto de Autonomía de Canarias (Organic Law 1/2018). Official State Gazette (in Spanish). 5 November 2018 [version as of 28 December 2022]. BOE-A-2018-15138.
- Ley 1/2022, de 11 de mayo, de Elecciones al Parlamento de Canarias (Law 1/2022). Official State Gazette (in Spanish). 11 May 2022 [version as of 23 May 2022]. BOE-A-2022-10043.
- Ley 4/2023, de 23 de marzo, de la Presidencia y del Gobierno de Canarias (Law 4/2023). Official State Gazette (in Spanish). 23 March 2023 [version as of 3 April 2023]. BOE-A-2023-12668.
- Decreto 26/2023, de 3 de abril, del Presidente, por el que se disuelve el Parlamento de Canarias y se convocan elecciones (Decree 26/2023). Official Gazette of the Canaries (in Spanish). 3 April 2023. BOC-A-2023-067-1011.
