= Ahora Canarias =

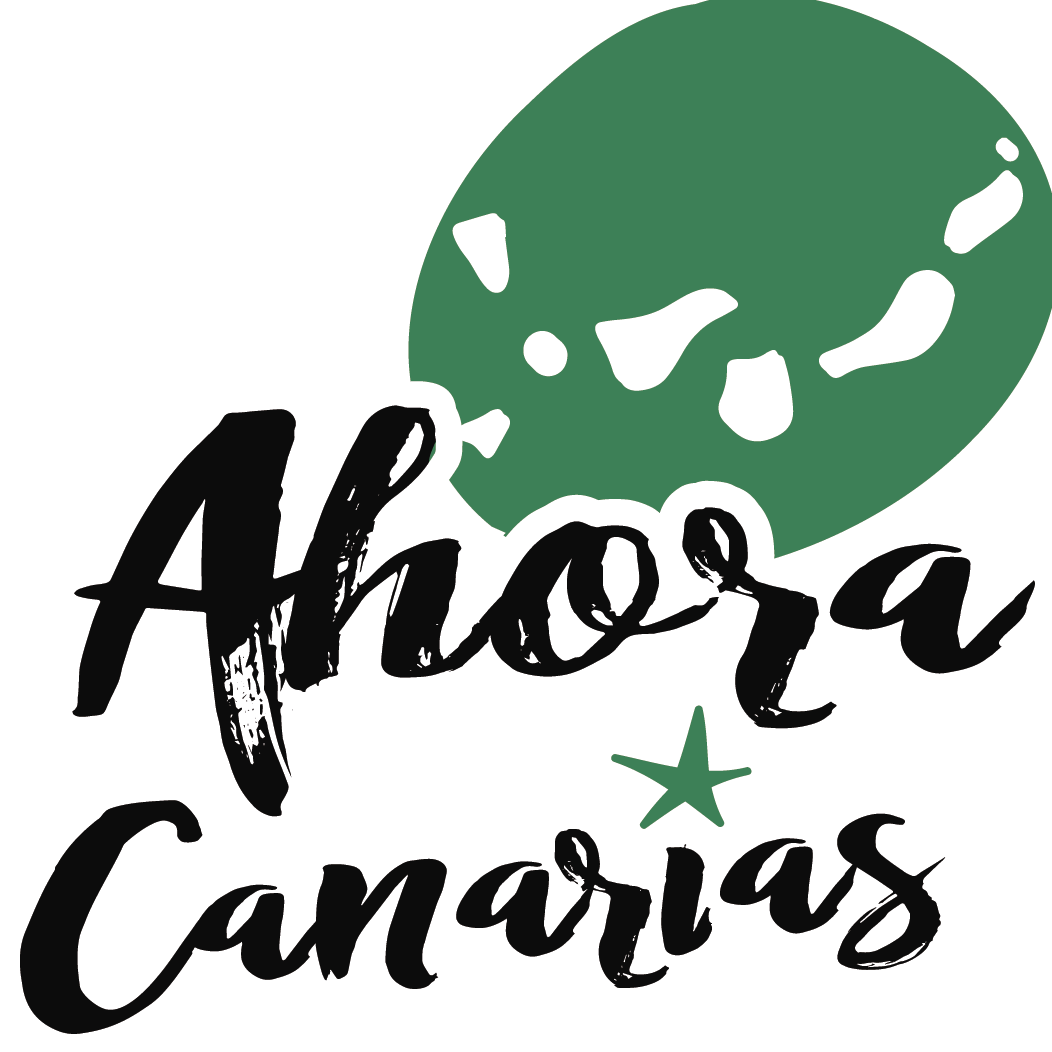
- Founded: February 8, 2019
- Merger of: ANC; CNC; UP
- Ideology: Canarian independence Socialism
- Political position: Left-wing to far-left
- National affiliation: Ahora Repúblicas (2019–2024)
- Regional affiliation: Drago Project (2023)
- Slogan: #UnidadIndependista

Website
- ahoracanarias.org

Ahora Canarias is a Canarian pro-independence federation of parties. It was launched on 8 February 2019 as an electoral coalition bringing together Alternativa Nacionalista Canaria (ANC) and Unidad del Pueblo (UP), among others, and later reorganised itself as a federation of parties in 2020.

== History ==
Ahora Canarias emerged from a push for unity among Canarian pro-independence forces. On 8 February 2019 the coalition was presented in Tenerife; its early public spokespeople cited ANC and UP among the core organisations, with the process also involving the Congreso Nacional de Canarias (CNC).

For the April 2019 Spanish general election and the 2019 Canarian regional election, the coalition ran lists in the Canary Islands. For the 2019 European election it participated inside the multi-party alliance Ahora Repúblicas led by ERC, EH Bildu and the BNG.

On 21 July 2020 the organisation announced it would cease to operate as a mere electoral coalition and constitute itself as a federation of parties, maintaining ANC and UP as its constituent members.

Ahead of the 2023 local and regional elections, Ahora Canarias initially joined the green-left platform Drago Verdes Canarias but withdrew on 7 March 2023, criticising the coalition’s internal dynamics. In April 2023 it announced a joint electoral ticket with the Partido Comunista del Pueblo Canario (PCPC) for municipal, island council and regional contests.

== Ideology and platform ==
Ahora Canarias situates itself within the Canarian pro-independence movement and frames its programme in socialist, ecological and feminist terms, with anticolonial and anti-imperialist positions expressed in its communications and allied media.

== Youth ==
The organisation’s youth wing is Ahul! – Juventudes Ahora Canarias, active since at least 2021.

== Election results ==
Local elections 2023
Municipality	Votes	%	Seats
Gran Canaria
Las Palmas de Gran Canaria	515	0,33%	0
Santa Lucía de Tirajana	458	1,67%	0
Agüimes	121	0,82%	0
Telde	93	0,20%	0
Tenerife
Santa Cruz de Tenerife	235	0,26%	0
Los Realejos	421	2,01%	0

Cortes Generales
Constituency	Votes	%	Notes
April 2019
Las Palmas	1,263	0.23%	
Santa Cruz de Tenerife	1,774	0.34%	
Canary Islands	3,037	0.29%	
November 2019
Las Palmas	1.110	0.23%	
Santa Cruz de Tenerife	922	0.20%	
Canary Islands	2,032	0.21%	
2023
Las Palmas	868	0.16%	In a coalition with the PCPE
Santa Cruz de Tenerife	772	0.15%	In a coalition with the PCPE
Canary Islands	1.640	0.16%	In a coalition with the PCPE

Parlamento de Canarias 2019
Constituency	Votes	%
Canary Islands at-large	3,163	0.36%
El Hierro	-	-
Fuerteventura	-	-
Gran Canaria	1,113	0.31%
La Gomera	-	-
La Palma	-	-
Lanzarote	176	0.37%
Tenerife	1,226	0.32%

Parlamento de Canarias 2023
Constituency	Votes	%
Canary Islands at-large	2,156	0.25%
El Hierro	-	-
Fuerteventura	-	-
Gran Canaria	1,250	0.36%
La Gomera	-	-
La Palma	-	-
Lanzarote	-	-
Tenerife	856	0.23%

European Parliament elections
Constituency	Year	Votes	%	Misc.
Canary Islands	2019	2.460	0,27%	Under the banner ANC–UP–Ahora Repúblicas
Canary Islands	2024	1,790	0.26%	Under the banner ANC–UP–Ahora Repúblicas
