= Lanzarote (Parliament of the Canary Islands constituency) =

Coordinates: 29°02′N 13°37′W

- Parliament of the Canary Islands; Electoral constituency
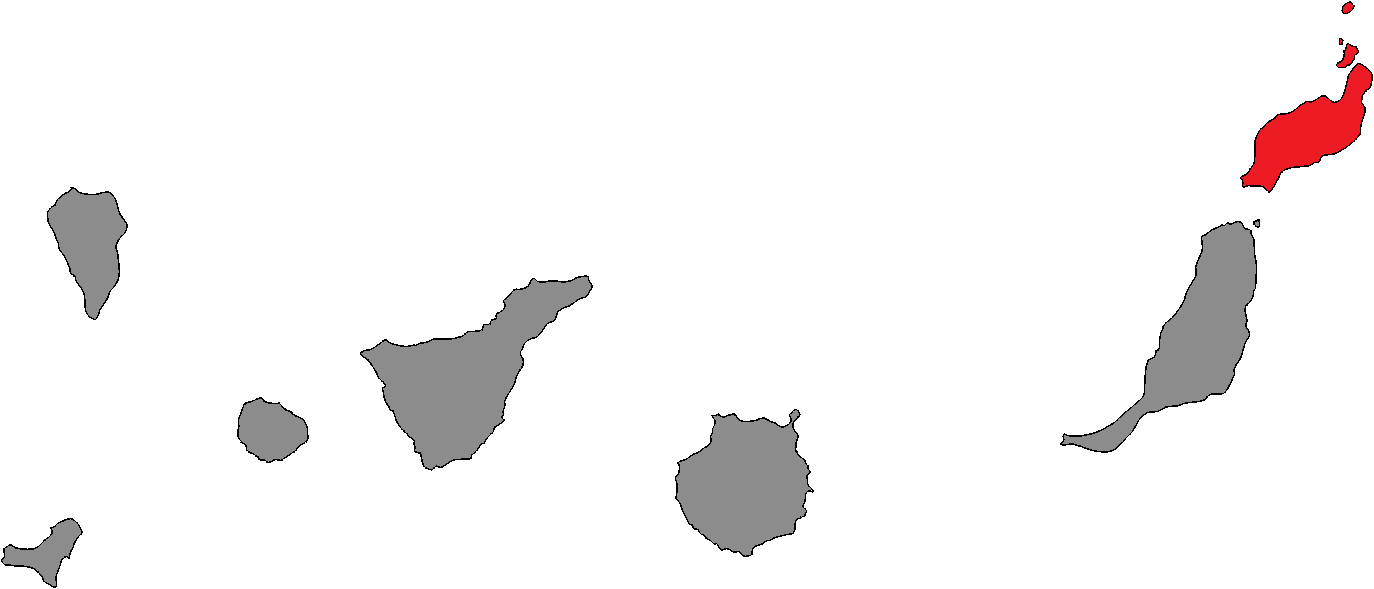
- Location of Lanzarote within the Canary Islands
- Island: Lanzarote
- Autonomous community: Canary Islands
- Population: ▲163,467 (2024)
- Electorate: ▲105,000 (2023)
- Major settlements: Arrecife

Current constituency
- Created: 1983
- Seats: 8
- Members: PSOE (3); CCa (3); PP (1); NC–BC (1)

Lanzarote is one of the seven constituencies (Spanish: circunscripciones) represented in the Parliament of the Canary Islands, the regional legislature of the Autonomous Community of the Canary Islands. The constituency currently elects 8 deputies. Its boundaries correspond to those of the island of Lanzarote. The electoral system uses the D'Hondt method and closed-list proportional representation, with a minimum threshold of fifteen percent in the constituency or four percent regionally.

== Electoral system ==
The constituency was created as per the Statute of Autonomy of the Canary Islands of 1982 and was first contested in the 1983 regional election. The Statute provides for the seven main islands in the Canarian archipelago—El Hierro, Fuerteventura, Gran Canaria, La Gomera, La Palma, Lanzarote and Tenerife—to be established as multi-member districts in the Parliament of the Canary Islands. Each constituency is allocated a fixed number of seats: 3 for El Hierro, 8 for Fuerteventura—7 until 2018—15 for Gran Canaria, 4 for La Gomera, 8 for La Palma, 8 for Lanzarote and 15 for Tenerife.

Voting is on the basis of universal suffrage, which comprises all nationals over eighteen, registered in the Canary Islands and in full enjoyment of their political rights. Amendments to the electoral law in 2011 required for Canarian citizens abroad to apply for voting before being permitted to vote, a system known as "begged" or expat vote (Spanish: Voto rogado) which was abolished in 2022. Seats are elected using the D'Hondt method and a closed list proportional representation, with an electoral threshold of 15 percent of valid votes—which includes blank ballots; until a 1997 reform, the threshold was set at 20 percent; between 1997 and 2018, it was set at 30 percent—being applied in each constituency. Alternatively, parties can also enter the seat distribution as long as they reach four percent regionally—three percent until 1997, six percent between 1997 and 2018.

The electoral law allows for parties and federations registered in the interior ministry, coalitions and groupings of electors to present lists of candidates. Parties and federations intending to form a coalition ahead of an election are required to inform the relevant Electoral Commission within ten days of the election call—fifteen before 1985—whereas groupings of electors need to secure the signature of at least one percent of the electorate in the constituencies for which they seek election—one-thousandth of the electorate, with a compulsory minimum of 500 signatures, until 1985—disallowing electors from signing for more than one list of candidates.

== Deputies ==
Deputies 1983–present
Key to parties Podemos LeP–SP PSOE NCa CDS PIL CCa PP CP
Cortes	Election	Distribution
1st	1983	5 / 1 / 2
2nd	1987	4 / 3 / 1
3rd	1991	3 / 1 / 4
4th	1995	2 / 3 / 1 / 2
5th	1999	3 / 4 / 1
6th	2003	2 / 3 / 2 / 1
7th	2007	4 / 2 / 2
8th	2011	1 / 1 / 4 / 2
9th	2015	1 / 2 / 1 / 3 / 1
10th	2019	1 / 3 / 3 / 1
11th	2023	3 / 1 / 3 / 1

== Regional elections ==
=== 2023 ===
Summary of the 28 May 2023 Parliament of the Canary Islands election results in Lanzarote
Parties and alliances	Popular vote			Seats	
Parties and alliances	Votes	%	±pp	Total	+/−
Spanish Socialist Workers' Party (PSOE)	14,347	29.00	+0.63	3	±0
Canarian Coalition (CCa)^{1}	13,497	27.28	–4.70	3	±0
People's Party (PP)	8,508	17.20	+4.52	1	±0
New Canaries–Canarian Bloc (NC–BC)	4,330	8.75	+3.49	1	+1
Vox (Vox)	3,402	6.88	+4.22	0	±0
United Yes We Can (Podemos–IUC–SSP)^{2}	2,136	4.32	–5.45	0	–1
Drago Greens Canaries (DVC)	1,237	2.50	New	0	±0
Canarian Nationalist Party (PNC)	269	0.54	New	0	±0
More Canaries (+C)	264	0.53	New	0	±0
Gather Sustainable Canaries (Reunir)	233	0.47	New	0	±0
Blank ballots	1,252	2.53	+0.73		
Total	49,475			8	±0
Valid votes	49,475	98.02	–0.87		
Invalid votes	1,000	1.98	+0.87		
Votes cast / turnout	50,475	48.07	–1.79		
Abstentions	54,525	51.93	+1.79		
Registered voters	105,000				
Sources
Footnotes: ^{1} Canarian Coalition results are compared to Canarian Coalition–Canarian Nationalist Party totals in the 2019 election.; ^{2} United We Can results are compared to the combined totals of Yes We Can Canaries and Canarian United Left in the 2019 election.

=== 2019 ===
Summary of the 26 May 2019 Parliament of the Canary Islands election results in Lanzarote
Parties and alliances	Popular vote			Seats	
Parties and alliances	Votes	%	±pp	Total	+/−
Canarian Coalition–Canarian Nationalist Party (CCa–PNC)^{1}	15,573	31.98	+2.53	3	±0
Spanish Socialist Workers' Party (PSOE)	13,818	28.37	+7.41	3	+1
People's Party (PP)	6,174	12.68	–0.33	1	±0
Stand Up Lanzarote–Yes We Can (Podemos–SSP–Equo)^{2}	3,943	8.10	–6.61	1	±0
Citizens–Party of the Citizenry (Cs)	2,710	5.56	–0.53	0	±0
New Canaries (NCa)	2,560	5.26	–3.03	0	–1
Vox (Vox)	1,296	2.66	New	0	±0
Canarian United Left (IUC)^{3}	813	1.67	–0.57	0	±0
United for Lanzarote (UPLanzarote)	657	1.35	New	0	±0
Canaries Now (ANC–UP)^{4}	176	0.36	–0.41	0	±0
With You, We Are Democracy (Contigo)	103	0.21	New	0	±0
Blank ballots	879	1.80	–0.70		
Total	48,702			8	±0
Valid votes	48,702	98.89	+0.72		
Invalid votes	547	1.11	–0.72		
Votes cast / turnout	49,249	49.86	–0.87		
Abstentions	49,519	50.14	+0.87		
Registered voters	98,768				
Sources
Footnotes: ^{1} Canarian Coalition–Canarian Nationalist Party results are compared to the combined totals of Canarian Coalition–Canarian Nationalist Party and Lanzarote Independents Party–United in the 2015 election.; ^{2} Stand Up Lanzarote–Yes We Can results are compared to We Can totals in the 2015 election.; ^{3} Canarian United Left results are compared to Canaries Decides totals in the 2015 election.; ^{4} Canaries Now results are compared to Canarian Nationalist Alternative totals in the 2015 election.

=== 2015 ===
Summary of the 24 May 2015 Parliament of the Canary Islands election results in Lanzarote
Parties and alliances	Popular vote			Seats	
Parties and alliances	Votes	%	±pp	Total	+/−
Canarian Coalition–Canarian Nationalist Party (CCa–PNC)	10,148	22.22	–12.55	3	–1
Spanish Socialist Workers' Party (PSOE)	9,571	20.96	+3.73	2	+1
We Can (Podemos)	6,715	14.71	New	1	+1
People's Party (PP)	5,941	13.01	–9.35	1	–1
New Canaries (NCa)	3,787	8.29	–5.34	1	±0
Lanzarote Independents Party–United (PIL–Unidos)	3,300	7.23	New	0	±0
Citizens–Party of the Citizenry (C's)	2,782	6.09	New	0	±0
Canaries Decides (IUC–LV–UP–ALTER)^{1}	1,023	2.24	–1.34	0	±0
Animalist Party Against Mistreatment of Animals (PACMA)	570	1.25	New	0	±0
Canarian Nationalist Alternative (ANC)	350	0.77	New	0	±0
Union, Progress and Democracy (UPyD)	197	0.43	–0.57	0	±0
Movement for the Unity of the Canarian People (MUPC)	138	0.30	+0.05	0	±0
Blank ballots	1,140	2.50	–1.38		
Total	45,662			8	±0
Valid votes	45,662	98.17	+1.61		
Invalid votes	850	1.83	–1.61		
Votes cast / turnout	46,512	50.73	–1.80		
Abstentions	45,170	49.27	+1.80		
Registered voters	91,682				
Sources
Footnotes: ^{1} Canaries Decides results are compared to the combined totals of Canarian United Left and The Greens in the 2011 election.

=== 2011 ===
Summary of the 22 May 2011 Parliament of the Canary Islands election results in Lanzarote
Parties and alliances	Popular vote			Seats	
Parties and alliances	Votes	%	±pp	Total	+/−
Canarian Coalition–Nationalist Party–Canarian Centre (CC–PNC–CCN)	14,901	34.77	+16.03	4	+2
People's Party (PP)	9,582	22.36	+7.13	2	±0
Spanish Socialist Workers' Party (PSOE)	7,386	17.23	–11.49	1	–3
Lanzarote Independents–Nationalist Party of Lanzarote–New Canaries (NCa)^{1}	5,840	13.63	–14.72	1	+1
Yes We Can Citizens' Alternative (ACSSP)^{2}	1,259	2.94	+0.11	0	±0
Canarian United Left (IUC)	813	1.90	+1.26	0	±0
The Greens (Verdes)	720	1.68	+0.73	0	±0
Union, Progress and Democracy (UPyD)	427	1.00	New	0	±0
Canarian Patriotic Movement (MPC)	161	0.38	New	0	±0
Movement for the Unity of the Canarian People (MUPC)	109	0.25	New	0	±0
Blank ballots	1,664	3.88	+1.29		
Total	42,862			8	±0
Valid votes	42,862	96.56	–2.73		
Invalid votes	1,528	3.44	+2.73		
Votes cast / turnout	44,390	52.53	–3.03		
Abstentions	40,114	47.47	+3.03		
Registered voters	84,504				
Sources
Footnotes: ^{1} Lanzarote Independents–Nationalist Party of Lanzarote–New Canaries results are compared to the combined totals of Lanzarote Independents Party–Canarian Centre and Nationalist Party of Lanzarote–New Canaries in the 2007 election.; ^{2} Yes We Can Citizens' Alternative results are compared to 25 May Citizens' Alternative–Canarian Popular Alternative totals in the 2007 election.

=== 2007 ===
Summary of the 27 May 2007 Parliament of the Canary Islands election results in Lanzarote
Parties and alliances	Popular vote			Seats	
Parties and alliances	Votes	%	±pp	Total	+/−
Spanish Socialist Workers' Party (PSOE)	12,727	28.72	+7.83	4	+2
Lanzarote Independents Party–Canarian Centre (PIL–CCN)	9,701	21.89	–8.54	0	–3
Canarian Coalition–Canarian Nationalist Party (CC–PNC)	8,303	18.74	–0.78	2	±0
People's Party (PP)	6,751	15.23	–2.48	2	+1
Nationalist Party of Lanzarote–New Canaries (NCa)	2,863	6.46	New	0	±0
25 May Citizens' Alternative–Canarian Popular Alternative (AC25M–APCa)^{1}	1,252	2.83	–3.49	0	±0
Alternative Island (ISAL)	870	1.96	New	0	±0
The Greens (Verdes)	420	0.95	New	0	±0
Canarian United Left (IUC)	284	0.64	–0.59	0	±0
Blank ballots	1,147	2.59	+0.93		
Total	44,318			8	±0
Valid votes	44,318	99.29	–0.14		
Invalid votes	316	0.71	+0.14		
Votes cast / turnout	44,634	55.56	–2.61		
Abstentions	35,703	44.44	+2.61		
Registered voters	80,337				
Sources
Footnotes: ^{1} 25 May Citizens' Alternative–Canarian Popular Alternative results are compared to 25 May Citizens' Alternative totals in the 2003 election.

=== 2003 ===
Summary of the 25 May 2003 Parliament of the Canary Islands election results in Lanzarote
Parties and alliances	Popular vote			Seats	
Parties and alliances	Votes	%	±pp	Total	+/−
Lanzarote Independents Party–Canarian Nationalist Federation (PIL–FNC)	13,086	30.43	+2.33	3	+3
Spanish Socialist Workers' Party (PSOE)	8,984	20.89	–3.28	2	–1
Canarian Coalition (CC)	8,393	19.52	–9.01	2	–2
People's Party (PP)	7,616	17.71	+4.45	1	±0
25 May Citizens' Alternative (AC25M)	2,719	6.32	New	0	±0
Lanzarote Assembly–PdA–PCL (AC–PdA–PCL)	964	2.24	New	0	±0
Canarian United Left (IUC)	527	1.23	–1.95	0	±0
Blank ballots	715	1.66	–0.70		
Total	43,004			8	±0
Valid votes	43,004	99.43	–0.04		
Invalid votes	247	0.57	+0.04		
Votes cast / turnout	43,251	58.17	+4.55		
Abstentions	31,108	41.83	–4.55		
Registered voters	74,359				

=== 1999 ===
Summary of the 13 June 1999 Parliament of the Canary Islands election results in Lanzarote
Parties and alliances	Popular vote			Seats	
Parties and alliances	Votes	%	±pp	Total	+/−
Canarian Coalition (CC)	10,480	28.53	+11.45	4	+3
Canarian Nationalist Federation–Lanzarote Independents Party (FNC–PIL)	10,320	28.10	–1.67	0	–3
Spanish Socialist Workers' Party (PSOE)	8,878	24.17	–1.06	3	+1
People's Party (PP)	4,869	13.26	–5.73	1	–1
Canarian United Left (IUC)	1,167	3.18	–1.30	0	±0
Centrist Union–Democratic and Social Centre (UC–CDS)	150	0.41	–2.35	0	±0
Blank ballots	868	2.36	+0.66		
Total	36,732			8	±0
Valid votes	36,732	99.47	–0.09		
Invalid votes	197	0.53	+0.09		
Votes cast / turnout	36,929	53.62	–6.78		
Abstentions	31,945	46.38	+6.78		
Registered voters	68,874				

=== 1995 ===
Summary of the 28 May 1995 Parliament of the Canary Islands election results in Lanzarote
Parties and alliances	Popular vote			Seats	
Parties and alliances	Votes	%	±pp	Total	+/−
Nationalist Canarian Platform–Lanzarote Independents Party (PCN–PIL)^{1}	9,844	29.77	–14.77	3	–1
Spanish Socialist Workers' Party (PSOE)	8,342	25.23	–7.11	2	–1
People's Party (PP)	6,279	18.99	+14.55	2	+2
Canarian Coalition (CC)^{2}	5,647	17.08	+11.72	1	+1
Canarian United Left (IUC)	1,480	4.48	New	0	±0
Democratic and Social Centre–Centrist Union (CDS–UC)	914	2.76	–7.87	0	–1
Blank ballots	562	1.70	+1.10		
Total	33,068			8	±0
Valid votes	33,068	99.56	–0.03		
Invalid votes	145	0.44	+0.03		
Votes cast / turnout	33,213	60.40	+2.00		
Abstentions	21,776	39.60	–2.00		
Registered voters	54,989				
Sources
Footnotes: ^{1} Nationalist Canarian Platform–Lanzarote Independents Party results are compared to Canarian Independent Groups–Lanzarote Independents Party totals in the 1991 election.; ^{2} Canarian Coalition results are compared to the combined totals of Canarian Initiative and Canarian Nationalist Party in the 1991 election.

=== 1991 ===
Summary of the 26 May 1991 Parliament of the Canary Islands election results in Lanzarote
Parties and alliances	Popular vote			Seats	
Parties and alliances	Votes	%	±pp	Total	+/−
Canarian Independent Groups–Lanzarote Independents Party (AIC–PIL)	13,756	44.54	+34.41	4	+3
Spanish Socialist Workers' Party (PSOE)	9,988	32.34	–2.09	3	–1
Democratic and Social Centre (CDS)	3,284	10.63	–21.34	1	–2
People's Party (PP)^{1}	1,371	4.44	–4.02	0	±0
Canarian Initiative (ICAN)^{2}	1,168	3.78	–3.34	0	±0
Canarian Coalition for Independence (CI (FREPIC–Awañac))	571	1.85	New	0	±0
Canarian Nationalist Party (PNC)	489	1.58	New	0	±0
Workers' Socialist Party (PST)	72	0.23	+0.02	0	±0
Blank ballots	186	0.60	–0.20		
Total	30,885			8	±0
Valid votes	30,885	99.59	+0.67		
Invalid votes	128	0.41	–0.67		
Votes cast / turnout	31,013	58.40	–7.88		
Abstentions	22,090	41.60	+7.88		
Registered voters	53,103				
Sources
Footnotes: ^{1} People's Party results are compared to the combined totals of People's Democratic Party–Canarian Centrists and People's Alliance in the 1987 election.; ^{2} Canarian Initiative results are compared to the combined totals of United Canarian Left and Canarian Assembly–Canarian Nationalist Left in the 1987 election.

=== 1987 ===
Summary of the 10 June 1987 Parliament of the Canary Islands election results in Lanzarote
Parties and alliances	Popular vote			Seats	
Parties and alliances	Votes	%	±pp	Total	+/−
Spanish Socialist Workers' Party (PSOE)	8,726	34.43	–12.96	4	–1
Democratic and Social Centre (CDS)	8,103	31.97	+19.94	3	+2
Canarian Independent Groups–Lanzarote Independents Group (AIC–AIL)	2,567	10.13	–3.29	1	+1
National Congress of the Canaries (CNC)	1,796	7.09	New	0	±0
United Canarian Left (ICU)^{1}	1,178	4.65	–0.03	0	±0
People's Democratic Party–Canarian Centrists (PDP–CC)	1,134	4.47	New	0	±0
People's Alliance (AP)^{2}	1,012	3.99	–14.22	0	–2
Canarian Assembly–Canarian Nationalist Left (AC–INC)	626	2.47	New	0	±0
Blank ballots	204	0.80	+0.80		
Total	25,346			8	±0
Valid votes	25,346	98.92	+0.85		
Invalid votes	278	1.08	–0.85		
Votes cast / turnout	25,624	66.28	+7.50		
Abstentions	13,035	33.72	–7.50		
Registered voters	38,659				
Sources
Footnotes: ^{1} United Canarian Left results are compared to Communist Party of the Canaries totals in the 1983 election.; ^{2} People's Alliance results are compared to People's Coalition totals in the 1983 election.

=== 1983 ===
Summary of the 8 May 1983 Parliament of the Canary Islands election results in Lanzarote
Parties and alliances	Popular vote			Seats	
Parties and alliances	Votes	%	±pp	Total	+/−
Spanish Socialist Workers' Party (PSOE)	9,595	47.39	n/a	5	n/a
People's Coalition (AP–PDP–UL)	3,687	18.21	n/a	2	n/a
Lanzarote Independents Group (AIL)	2,718	13.42	n/a	0	n/a
Democratic and Social Centre (CDS)	2,435	12.03	n/a	1	n/a
Communist Party of the Canaries (PCC–PCE)	948	4.68	n/a	0	n/a
Canarian Nationalist Convergence (CNC)	864	4.27	n/a	0	n/a
Blank ballots	0	0.00	n/a		
Total	20,247			8	n/a
Valid votes	20,247	98.07	n/a		
Invalid votes	398	1.93	n/a		
Votes cast / turnout	20,645	58.78	n/a		
Abstentions	14,479	41.22	n/a		
Registered voters	35,124				

== Bibliography ==
- Government of the Canary Islands (November 1987). Resultados procesos electorales en Canarias. Elecciones Locales: Ayuntamientos y Cabildos (1979-1983-1987). Elecciones Autonómicas: Parlamento de Canarias (1983-1987) (PDF) (in Spanish). Las Palmas de Gran Canaria: Statistics and Documentation Center of the Canary Islands. pp. 203–270. Archived from the original on 2017-04-17.
