= Nicasio Galván =

Spanish politician (born 1973)

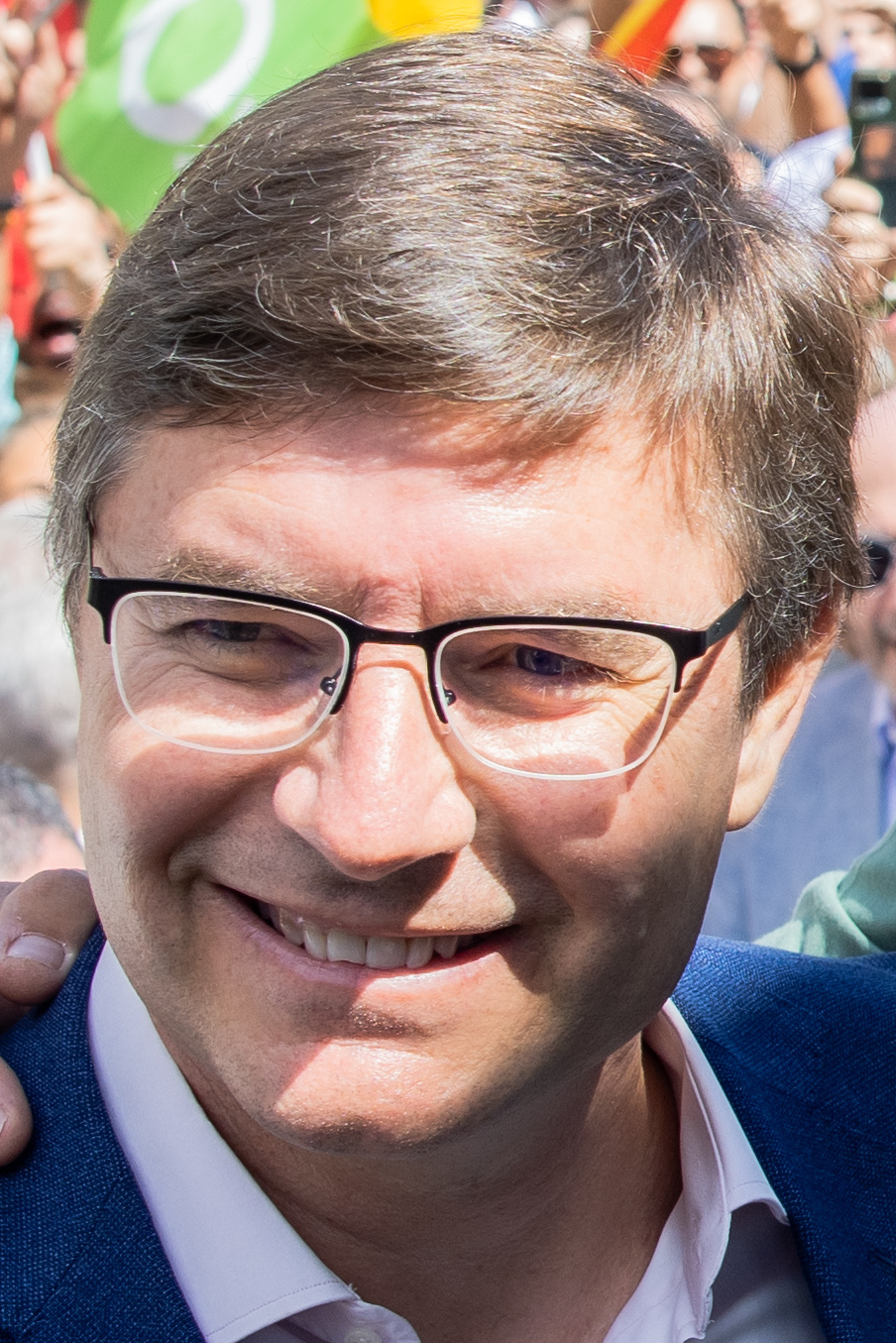
- Galván in 2023

Member of the Parliament of the Canary Islands
- Incumbent
- Assumed office 27 June 2023

Personal details
- Born: 20 February 1973 (age 53)
- Party: Vox (since 2014)

Nicasio Jesús Galván Sasia (born 20 February 1973) is a Spanish politician serving as a member of the Parliament of the Canary Islands since 2023. In the 2023 regional election, he was the candidate of Vox for president of the Canary Islands.
