= Drago Canarias =

Drago Canarias Drago Canarias
- Abbreviation: DRAGO
- Leader: Alberto Rodríguez Rodríguez
- Founder: Alberto Rodríguez Rodríguez
- Founded: 24 October 2022
- Split from: Podemos Canarias
- Ideology: Canarian nationalism Ecologism; Feminism
- Political position: Left-wing
- National affiliation: Sumar (2023-2024)
- Colours: Black; Yellow; Dark Green
- Canarian Parliament: 0 / 70

Website
- dragocanarias.com

Drago Canarias (DRG), commonly known simply as Drago Canarias or Drago, is a political party based in the Canary Islands, which emerged from the socio-political association Proyecto Drago-Canarias en la Encrucijada (Drago Project - Canary Islands at the Crossroads). The party defines its political identity around concepts such as "Canarian obedience", sovereigntism, the defence of the territory, and a confederal organisational structure.

Proyecto Drago was publicly launched on 24 October 2022, and Drago Canarias was registered with the Spanish Ministry of the Interior's Registry of Political Parties on 16 December of that year. In the 2023 Canarian regional, island council and local elections, it contested the elections as part of the Drago Verdes Canarias coalition, alongside Verdes Equo and Los Verdes. It gained its first institutional representation with two councillors on the City Council of San Cristóbal de La Laguna. In the Spanish general election held later that year, it participated as part of the Sumar coalition, without securing representation of its own in the Cortes Generales.

Following the 2023 electoral cycle, the party began a process of reorganisation and territorial expansion through the establishment of island and municipal branches across different parts of the archipielago. Its institucional representation remains concentrated in the City Council of San Cristóbal de La Laguna, where it holds two seats, represented by councillors Alberto Rodríguez and Carmen Peña.

== Background ==
On 20 January 2021, the Supreme Court of Spain indicted Rodríguez for an alleged crime of attack against authority and misdemeanor or misdemeanor injury for incidents that occurred in 2014. The high court began the procedure once the Congress of Deputies accepted the request requested in December 2020. In October 2021, he was convicted of attacking authority, having to pay a fine of 540 euros in compensation for avoiding imprisonment and being disqualified from holding public office. He was disqualified as a deputy on October 22, 2021, after a few weeks of controversy between the Supreme Court and the Congress of Deputies. On October 23, he announced that he was leaving Podemos.

In January 2023, Rodríguez announced that the party had joined the Más País coalition of left-wing and regionalist parties.

== Coalition(s) ==
During February 2023 the party formed a coalition comprised by four parties. However, in the following month, Canaries Now left the alliance.

Party	Notes
Drago Canaries Party (DRG)	
Greens Equo (Verdes Equo)	
Canaries Now (Ahora Canarias)	Left in March 2023.
The Greens–Greens Federation (LV)	

== Ideology ==
It claims to be a "Canarian obedience" project, which should not depend on any ideology.

== Electoral performance ==
=== Parliament of the Canary Islands ===
Election	Island constituencies		Regional constituency		Seats	+/–	Government
Election	Votes	%	Votes	%	Seats	+/–	Government
2023	27,916	3.2 (#7)	29,504	3.4 (#6)	0 / 70	0	Extra-parliamentary
