= Manuel Domínguez González =

Spanish People's Party politician

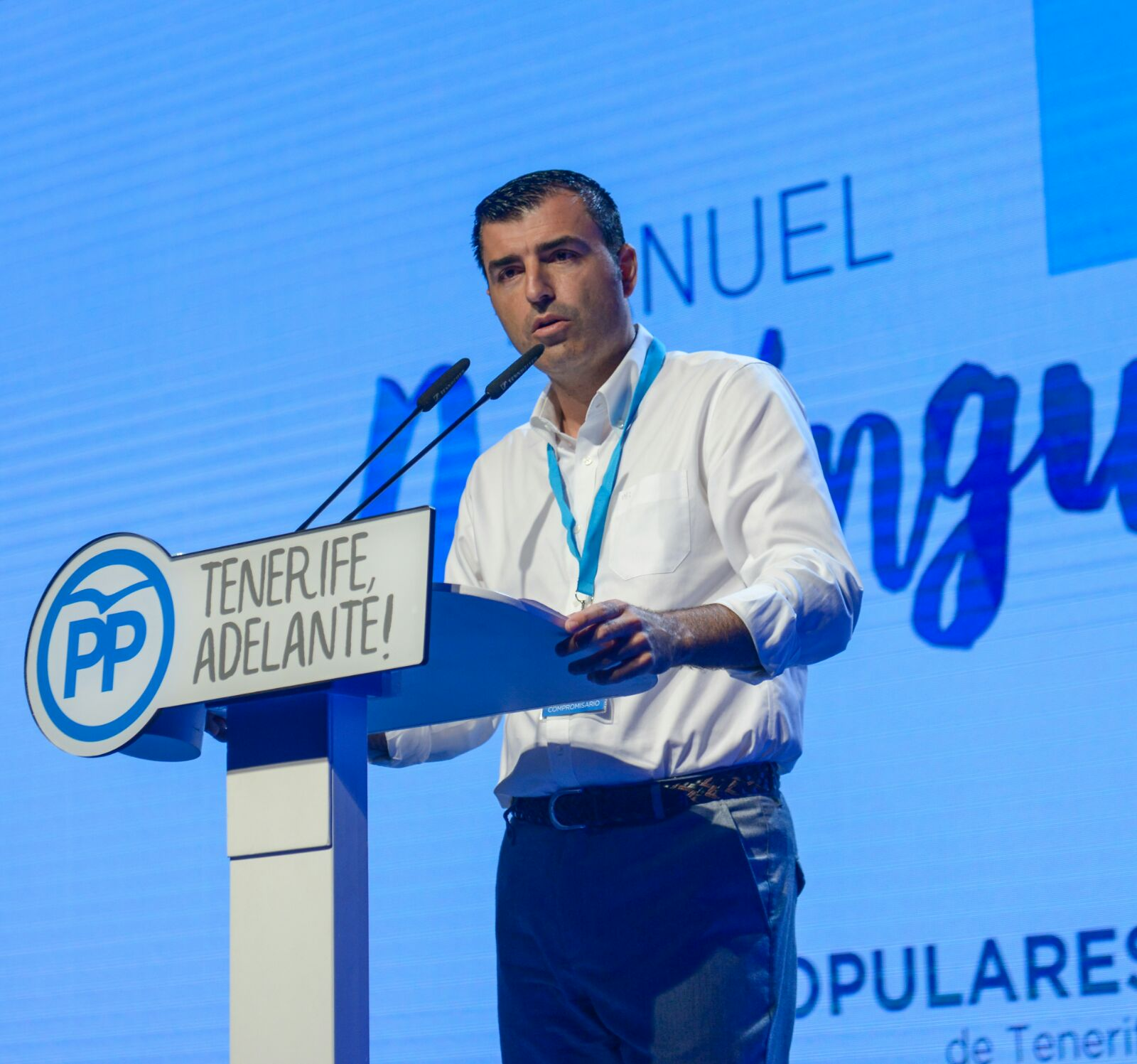

Manuel Domínguez González (born 25 January 1974) is a Spanish People's Party politician. He has been a town councillor (2003–) and the mayor (2011–) of Los Realejos in Tenerife, a member of the Congress of Deputies (2009–2011) and the Parliament of the Canary Islands (2019–).

== Biography ==
Born in Caracas, Venezuela, Domínguez graduated with a degree in Business Management and Administration from the Escuela Superior de Management, and a Master of Business Administration from the University of Wyoming.

He was first elected to the town council of Los Realejos, Tenerife in 2003, becoming treasurer. In 2007 he and the People's Party went into opposition but in his third mandate, starting from 2011, they had an absolute majority and he became mayor. His majority widened in 2015 but fell by one seat in 2019. He was also in the Congress of Deputies between 2009 and 2011.

In 2012, incumbent Cristina Tavío named Domínguez as the next president of the PP on Tenerife. In the 2019 Canarian regional election, he led the party's list on the island. He ran unopposed to succeed Australia Navarro as leader of the People's Party of the Canary Islands, being officially installed in January 2022.
