= Opinion polling for the 2015 Spanish local elections (Castilla–La Mancha) =

In the run up to the 2015 Spanish local elections, various organisations carried out opinion polling to gauge voting intention in local entities in Spain. Results of such polls for municipalities in Castilla–La Mancha are displayed in this article. The date range for these opinion polls is from the previous local elections, held on 22 May 2011, to the day the next elections were held, on 24 May 2015.

Polls are listed in reverse chronological order, showing the most recent first and using the dates when the survey fieldwork was done, as opposed to the date of publication. Where the fieldwork dates are unknown, the date of publication is given instead. The highest percentage figure in each polling survey is displayed with its background shaded in the leading party's colour. If a tie ensues, this is applied to the figures with the highest percentages. The "Lead" columns on the right shows the percentage-point difference between the parties with the highest percentages in a given poll.

== Municipalities ==
=== Albacete ===
Color key:

Exit poll

Polling firm/Commissioner	Fieldwork date	Sample size	Turnout	PP	PSOE	IU	UPyD	Podemos	C's	Ganemos	Lead
2015 municipal election	24 May 2015	—N/a	67.3	33.5; 10	27.3; 8	(Note: Within Ganemos Albacete.)	1.7; 0		13.6; 4	15.3; 5	6.2
TNS Demoscopia/RTVE–FORTA	24 May 2015	?	?	36.7; 11/13	24.7; 7/8		–		14.3; 4/5	12.8; 3/4	12.0
NC Report/El Digital de Albacete	4–7 May 2015	600	?	40.3; 13	23.3; 7		2.4; 0	9.1; 2	15.5; 4	5.9; 1	17.0
Sigma Dos/La Tribuna	29–30 Apr 2015	600	?	38.6; 11/12	24.8; 7		–		16.8; 4/5	15.7; 4	13.8
Noxa/La Calle	11–17 Apr 2015	?	?	33.0	32.7	4.3	4.5	14.0	8.4	–	0.3
2011 municipal election	22 May 2011	—N/a	70.0	52.1; 16	33.2; 10	6.2; 1	3.7; 0	–	–	–	18.9

=== Almansa ===
Polling firm/Commissioner	Fieldwork date	Sample size	Turnout	PSOE	PP	AEIA	DPA	IU	UPyD	C's	Lead
2015 municipal election	24 May 2015	—N/a	71.4	34.9; 8	44.1; 11	1.4; 0	4.7; 0	8.3; 2	0.9; 0	3.8; 0	9.2
PSOE	8–15 May 2015	250	?	36.0; 9	24.4; 6	4.0; 0	6.0; 1	10.4; 2	0.8; 0	11.2; 3	11.6
2011 municipal election	22 May 2011	—N/a	72.4	36.9; 9	32.4; 8	14.1; 3	5.9; 1	4.9; 0	2.4; 0	–	4.5

=== Azuqueca de Henares ===
Polling firm/Commissioner	Fieldwork date	Sample size	Turnout	PSOE	PP	IU	UPyD	Podemos	C's	G	Lead
2015 municipal election	24 May 2015	—N/a	65.1	41.4; 10	20.6; 4	13.0; 3	2.1; 0	–	13.1; 3	6.2; 1	20.8
Noxa/La Calle	11–17 Apr 2015	?	?	44.6	27.3	5.1	3.2	8.2	9.5	–	17.3
2011 municipal election	22 May 2011	—N/a	66.3	47.9; 11	38.3; 9	7.1; 1	–	–	–	–	9.6

=== Ciudad Real ===
Color key:

Exit poll

Polling firm/Commissioner	Fieldwork date	Sample size	Turnout	PP	PSOE	IU	UPyD	Podemos	C's	Ganemos Ciudad Real–CLM	Lead
2015 municipal election	24 May 2015	—N/a	66.7	36.8; 10	31.2; 9	(Note: Within Ganemos Ciudad Real.)	3.4; 0		7.5; 2	15.7; 4	5.6
TNS Demoscopia/RTVE–FORTA	24 May 2015	?	?	32.0; 8/10	33.0; 9/10		–		10.0; 2/3	18.1; 5/6	1.0
Sigma Dos/La Tribuna	20–21 Apr 2015	400	?	44.4; 12	18.9; 4/5		–		19.9; 5/6	12.5; 3	24.5
Noxa/La Calle	11–17 Apr 2015	?	?	38.7	37.1	2.8	5.0	6.3	7.2	–	1.6
2011 municipal election	22 May 2011	—N/a	69.9	51.6; 15	31.7; 9	5.9; 1	4.9; 0	–	–	–	19.9

=== Cuenca ===
Color key:

Exit poll

Polling firm/Commissioner	Fieldwork date	Sample size	Turnout	PSOE	PP	IU	UPyD	Podemos	C's	Lead
2015 municipal election	24 May 2015	—N/a	68.2	32.6; 9	37.3; 10	12.8; 3	2.1; 0	–	10.3; 3	4.7
TNS Demoscopia/RTVE–FORTA	24 May 2015	?	?	35.3; 9/11	31.5; 8/9	16.2; 3/4	–	–	10.9; 3/4	3.8
Sigma Dos/La Tribuna	20–21 Apr 2015	400	?	31.6; 8/9	35.3; 9/10	14.8; 4	1.5; 0	–	13.1; 3	3.7
Noxa/La Calle	11–17 Apr 2015	?	?	38.6	37.0	4.0	3.8	8.5	5.1	1.6
2011 municipal election	22 May 2011	—N/a	72.4	43.8; 13	43.3; 12	4.5; 0	2.9; 0	–	–	0.5

=== Guadalajara ===
Color key:

Exit poll

Polling firm/Commissioner	Fieldwork date	Sample size	Turnout	PP	PSOE	IU	UPyD	Podemos	C's	AG	G	Lead
2015 municipal election	24 May 2015	—N/a	69.3	37.2; 11	28.3; 8	(Note: Within Ahora Guadalajara.)	2.1; 0		9.6; 2	16.8; 4	2.3; 0	8.9
TNS Demoscopia/RTVE–FORTA	24 May 2015	?	?	34.9; 9/11	31.5; 8/10		–		11.0; 2/3	12.0; 2/3	5.1; 1/2	3.4
Noxa/La Calle	11–17 Apr 2015	?	?	39.2	30.8	3.8	3.7	11.8	7.7	–	–	8.4
2011 municipal election	22 May 2011	—N/a	72.3	54.2; 16	30.4; 8	6.1; 1	3.4; 0	–	–	–	–	23.8

=== Hellín ===
Polling firm/Commissioner	Fieldwork date	Sample size	Turnout	PP	PSOE	IU	C's	Lead
2015 municipal election	24 May 2015	—N/a	59.5	33.7; 8	37.1; 9	9.8; 2	9.2; 2	3.4
ACG/El Objetivo de Hellín	7–22 Jan 2014	250	?	31.9	38.9	25.7	–	7.0
2011 municipal election	22 May 2011	—N/a	67.8	43.5; 10	40.1; 9	11.9; 2	–	3.4

=== Puertollano ===
Color key:

Exit poll

Polling firm/Commissioner	Fieldwork date	Sample size	Turnout	PSOE	PP	IU	UPyD	Podemos	C's	CPP	Lead
2015 municipal election	24 May 2015	—N/a	61.5	40.0; 11	26.1; 7	17.1; 4	–	–	10.8; 3	4.1; 0	13.9
TNS Demoscopia/RTVE–FORTA	24 May 2015	?	?	40.3; 10/12	28.2; 7/8	16.8; 3/4	–	–	8.8; 2/3	–	12.1
Sigma Dos/La Tribuna	12–14 May 2015	400	?	39.4; 10/11	25.7; 7	11.5; 3	–	–	10.6; 2/3	7.4; 2	13.7
IES Juan de Távora	7–10 May 2015	500	?	42.1; 11/13	21.3; 5/6	8.4; 2	–	–	15.0; 4	8.0; 0/2	20.8
Noxa/La Calle	11–17 Apr 2015	?	?	51.6	27.3	4.1	2.4	8.6	4.2	–	24.3
2011 municipal election	22 May 2011	—N/a	63.3	44.5; 12	38.9; 10	11.1; 3	3.5; 0	–	–	–	5.6

=== Talavera de la Reina ===
Color key:

Exit poll

Polling firm/Commissioner	Fieldwork date	Sample size	Turnout	PP	PSOE	IU	UPyD	Podemos	C's	Ganemos Talavera	Lead
2015 municipal election	24 May 2015	—N/a	64.5	39.5; 11	31.9; 8	(Note: Within Ganemos Talavera.)	1.3; 0		8.7; 2	14.6; 4	7.6
TNS Demoscopia/RTVE–FORTA	24 May 2015	?	?	38.4; 10/12	29.5; 7/8		–		11.8; 3/4	15.6; 3/4	8.9
Sigma Dos/La Tribuna	21–22 Apr 2015	400	?	32.4; 8/9	30.7; 8		–		14.5; 3/4	18.8; 5	1.7
La Voz del Tajo	16–20 Apr 2015	5,023	?	40.8; 10	42.3; 11		1.5; 0		8.0; 2	7.4; 2	1.5
Noxa/La Calle	11–17 Apr 2015	?	?	38.2	39.9	2.7	2.2	8.2	5.8	–	1.7
2011 municipal election	22 May 2011	—N/a	69.2	52.0; 14	36.9; 10	6.0; 1	2.9; 0	–	–	–	15.1

=== Toledo ===
Color key:

Exit poll

Polling firm/Commissioner	Fieldwork date	Sample size	Turnout	PSOE	PP	IU	UPyD	Podemos	C's	GT	Vox	Lead
2015 municipal election	24 May 2015	—N/a	71.9	30.2; 9	32.9; 9	(Note: Within Ganemos Toledo.)	1.2; 0		10.1; 3	16.7; 4	1.8; 0	2.7
TNS Demoscopia/RTVE–FORTA	24 May 2015	?	?	30.0; 8/9	33.2; 9/11		–		11.7; 3/4	15.4; 3/4	–	3.2
GAD3/ABC	23–28 Apr 2015	440	?	29.8; 8/9	37.6; 10/11		2.3; 0		8.2; 2	16.5; 4	–	7.8
Sigma Dos/La Tribuna	24–27 Apr 2015	400	?	33.8; 9	34.4; 9		–		14.5; 3/4	13.8; 3/4	–	0.6
Noxa/La Calle	11–17 Apr 2015	?	?	40.1	35.3	4.1	4.0	7.2	7.0	–	–	4.8
Celeste-Tel/PSOE	23 Mar–1 Apr 2015	500	?	41.0; 11	32.7; 9		0.6; 0		12.8; 3	8.7; 2	3.3; 0	8.3
2011 municipal election	22 May 2011	—N/a	75.2	43.8; 12	42.4; 11	7.9; 2	2.4; 0	–	–	–	–	1.4
