= 2003 Spanish local elections in Castilla–La Mancha =

This article presents the results breakdown of the local elections held in Castilla–La Mancha on 25 May 2003. The following tables show detailed results in the autonomous community's most populous municipalities, sorted alphabetically.

== City control ==
The following table lists party control in the most populous municipalities, including provincial capitals (highlighted in bold). Gains for a party are highlighted in that party's colour.

Municipality	Population	Previous control	New control
**Albacete**	152,155	Spanish Socialist Workers' Party (PSOE)	Spanish Socialist Workers' Party (PSOE)
**Ciudad Real**	65,084	People's Party (PP)	People's Party (PP)
**Cuenca**	46,859	Spanish Socialist Workers' Party (PSOE)	Spanish Socialist Workers' Party (PSOE)
**Guadalajara**	69,098	People's Party (PP)	Spanish Socialist Workers' Party (PSOE)
Talavera de la Reina	77,519	Spanish Socialist Workers' Party (PSOE)	Spanish Socialist Workers' Party (PSOE)
**Toledo**	70,893	People's Party (PP)	People's Party (PP)

== Municipalities ==
=== Albacete ===
Population: 152,155

← Summary of the 25 May 2003 City Council of Albacete election results →
Parties and alliances	Popular vote			Seats	
Parties and alliances	Votes	%	±pp	Total	+/−
Spanish Socialist Workers' Party (PSOE)	37,142	47.64	+3.01	**14**	+1
People's Party (PP)	32,801	42.07	+0.14	**12**	±0
United Left–Left of Castilla–La Mancha (IU–ICAM)	4,731	6.07	−2.06	**1**	−1
Manchegan Regionalist Party (PRM)	880	1.13	−0.24	0	±0
Humanist Party (PH)	290	0.37	−0.05	0	±0
Blank ballots	2,116	2.71	−0.82		
**Total**	**77,960**			**27**	**±0**
Valid votes	77,960	99.34	+0.18		
Invalid votes	518	0.66	−0.18		
**Votes cast / turnout**	**78,478**	**65.29**	**+2.33**		
Abstentions	41,723	34.71	−2.33		
**Registered voters**	**120,201**				

=== Ciudad Real ===
Population: 65,084

← Summary of the 25 May 2003 City Council of Ciudad Real election results →
Parties and alliances	Popular vote			Seats	
Parties and alliances	Votes	%	±pp	Total	+/−
People's Party (PP)	15,736	45.38	−6.34	**13**	−2
Spanish Socialist Workers' Party (PSOE)	15,209	43.86	+6.69	**12**	+2
United Left–Left of Castilla–La Mancha (IU–ICAM)	1,380	3.98	−0.45	0	±0
Castilian Unity (UdCa)	1,140	3.29	New	0	±0
Commoners' Land–Castilian Nationalist Party (TC–PNC)	105	0.30	+0.10	0	±0
Humanist Party (PH)	89	0.26	+0.03	0	±0
Blank ballots	1,018	2.94	−0.33		
**Total**	**34,677**			**25**	**±0**
Valid votes	34,677	99.25	+0.21		
Invalid votes	262	0.75	−0.21		
**Votes cast / turnout**	**34,939**	**66.83**	**+1.43**		
Abstentions	17,338	33.17	−1.43		
**Registered voters**	**52,277**				

=== Cuenca ===
Population: 46,859

← Summary of the 25 May 2003 City Council of Cuenca election results →
Parties and alliances	Popular vote			Seats	
Parties and alliances	Votes	%	±pp	Total	+/−
Spanish Socialist Workers' Party (PSOE)	11,506	45.14	−2.17	**11**	±0
People's Party (PP)	10,135	39.76	−3.48	**9**	−1
Independents for Cuenca (ixC)	2,040	8.00	New	**1**	+1
United Left (IU)	933	3.66	+0.52	0	±0
Republican Left (IR)	143	0.56	New	0	±0
Commoners' Land–Castilian Nationalist Party (TC–PNC)	86	0.34	−2.56	0	±0
Humanist Party (PH)	50	0.20	+0.04	0	±0
Blank ballots	599	2.35	+0.08		
**Total**	**25,492**			**21**	**±0**
Valid votes	25,492	99.22	+0.02		
Invalid votes	201	0.78	−0.02		
**Votes cast / turnout**	**25,693**	**68.92**	**−1.79**		
Abstentions	11,586	31.08	+1.79		
**Registered voters**	**37,279**				

=== Guadalajara ===
Population: 69,098

← Summary of the 25 May 2003 City Council of Guadalajara election results →
Parties and alliances	Popular vote			Seats	
Parties and alliances	Votes	%	±pp	Total	+/−
People's Party (PP)	17,176	44.46	−2.25	**12**	−1
Spanish Socialist Workers' Party (PSOE)	16,937	43.84	+5.65	**12**	+2
United Left–Left of Castilla–La Mancha (IU–ICAM)	2,715	7.03	−1.71	**1**	−1
Spanish Democratic Party (PADE)	285	0.74	New	0	±0
Regionalist Party of Guadalajara (PRGU)	266	0.69	−0.40	0	±0
Commoners' Land–Castilian Nationalist Party (TC–PNC)	185	0.48	−0.04	0	±0
Humanist Party (PH)	96	0.25	−0.03	0	±0
Blank ballots	974	2.52	−1.27		
**Total**	**38,634**			**25**	**±0**
Valid votes	38,634	99.28	+0.38		
Invalid votes	280	0.72	−0.38		
**Votes cast / turnout**	**38,914**	**71.29**	**+5.73**		
Abstentions	15,668	28.71	−5.73		
**Registered voters**	**54,582**				

=== Talavera de la Reina ===
Population: 77,519

← Summary of the 25 May 2003 City Council of Talavera de la Reina election results →
Parties and alliances	Popular vote			Seats	
Parties and alliances	Votes	%	±pp	Total	+/−
Spanish Socialist Workers' Party (PSOE)	23,621	57.15	+9.56	**15**	+1
People's Party (PP)	15,087	36.51	−2.93	**10**	−1
United Left–Left of Castilla–La Mancha (IU–ICAM)	1,354	3.28	−0.60	0	±0
Union of Talavera and Region (UTyC)	346	0.84	−0.64	0	±0
Party of Self-employed, Retired and Wives (PAJV)	196	0.47	New	0	±0
Blank ballots	724	1.75	−0.70		
**Total**	**41,328**			**25**	**±0**
Valid votes	41,328	99.31	+0.10		
Invalid votes	288	0.69	−0.10		
**Votes cast / turnout**	**41,616**	**67.68**	**−0.25**		
Abstentions	19,876	32.32	+0.25		
**Registered voters**	**61,492**				

=== Toledo ===
Population: 70,893

← Summary of the 25 May 2003 City Council of Toledo election results →
Parties and alliances	Popular vote			Seats	
Parties and alliances	Votes	%	±pp	Total	+/−
People's Party (PP)	18,762	47.20	+1.59	**13**	±0
Spanish Socialist Workers' Party (PSOE)	17,137	43.11	+1.20	**11**	±0
United Left–Left of Castilla–La Mancha (IU–ICAM)	2,482	6.24	−0.15	**1**	±0
Family and Life Party (PFyV)	276	0.69	New	0	±0
Commoners' Land–Castilian Nationalist Party (TC–PNC)	155	0.39	−0.07	0	±0
Humanist Party (PH)	74	0.19	+0.02	0	±0
Blank ballots	864	2.17	−0.62		
**Total**	**39,750**			**25**	**±0**
Valid votes	39,750	99.34	+0.13		
Invalid votes	263	0.66	−0.13		
**Votes cast / turnout**	**40,013**	**70.24**	**+1.61**		
Abstentions	16,951	29.76	−1.61		
**Registered voters**	**56,964**				

== See also ==
- 2003 Castilian-Manchegan regional election
