= 1995 Spanish local elections in Castilla–La Mancha =

This article presents the results breakdown of the local elections held in Castilla–La Mancha on 28 May 1995. The following tables show detailed results in the autonomous community's most populous municipalities, sorted alphabetically.

== City control ==
The following table lists party control in the most populous municipalities, including provincial capitals (highlighted in bold). Gains for a party are highlighted in that party's colour.

Municipality	Population	Previous control	New control
**Albacete**	141,179	Spanish Socialist Workers' Party (PSOE)	People's Party (PP)
**Ciudad Real**	62,072	Spanish Socialist Workers' Party (PSOE)	People's Party (PP)
**Cuenca**	44,960	Spanish Socialist Workers' Party (PSOE)	People's Party (PP)
**Guadalajara**	67,401	People's Party (PP)	People's Party (PP)
Talavera de la Reina	75,138	Spanish Socialist Workers' Party (PSOE)	People's Party (PP)
**Toledo**	64,040	Spanish Socialist Workers' Party (PSOE)	People's Party (PP)

== Municipalities ==
=== Albacete ===
Population: 141,179

← Summary of the 28 May 1995 City Council of Albacete election results →
Parties and alliances	Popular vote			Seats	
Parties and alliances	Votes	%	±pp	Total	+/−
People's Party (PP)	39,797	51.52	+16.25	**15**	+5
Spanish Socialist Workers' Party (PSOE)	22,553	29.20	−18.38	**8**	−6
United Left–Left of Castilla–La Mancha (IU–ICAM)	11,703	15.15	+4.74	**4**	+1
Manchegan Regionalist Party (PRM)	861	1.11	+0.02	0	±0
Democratic and Social Centre (CDS)	406	0.53	−3.04	0	±0
Platform of Independents of Spain (PIE)	389	0.50	New	0	±0
Humanist Party (PH)	146	0.19	New	0	±0
Blank ballots	1,389	1.80	+0.10		
**Total**	**77,244**			**27**	**±0**
Valid votes	77,244	99.45	+0.35		
Invalid votes	426	0.55	−0.35		
**Votes cast / turnout**	**77,670**	**71.97**	**+13.46**		
Abstentions	30,246	28.03	−13.46		
**Registered voters**	**107,916**				

=== Ciudad Real ===
Population: 62,072

← Summary of the 28 May 1995 City Council of Ciudad Real election results →
Parties and alliances	Popular vote			Seats	
Parties and alliances	Votes	%	±pp	Total	+/−
People's Party (PP)	19,332	57.58	+18.22	**16**	+6
Spanish Socialist Workers' Party (PSOE)	8,811	26.24	−15.65	**7**	−4
United Left–Left of Castilla–La Mancha (IU–ICAM)	3,621	10.79	+3.16	**2**	±0
Regionalist Party of Castilla–La Mancha (PRCM)	740	2.20	New	0	±0
Centrist Union (UC)	487	1.45	−5.81	0	−2
Blank ballots	582	1.73	+0.06		
**Total**	**33,573**			**25**	**±0**
Valid votes	33,573	99.28	+0.47		
Invalid votes	242	0.72	−0.47		
**Votes cast / turnout**	**33,815**	**71.11**	**+14.60**		
Abstentions	13,741	28.89	−14.60		
**Registered voters**	**47,556**				

=== Cuenca ===
Population: 44,960

← Summary of the 28 May 1995 City Council of Cuenca election results →
Parties and alliances	Popular vote			Seats	
Parties and alliances	Votes	%	±pp	Total	+/−
People's Party (PP)	13,583	51.29	+8.83	**11**	+1
Spanish Socialist Workers' Party (PSOE)	10,699	40.40	−7.84	**9**	−2
United Left–Left of Castilla–La Mancha (IU–ICAM)	1,381	5.21	+1.17	**1**	+1
Democratic and Social Centre–Cuencan People's Union (CDS–UPCo)	303	1.14	−1.26	0	±0
Commoners' Land–Castilian Nationalist Party (TC–PNC)	133	0.50	−1.02	0	±0
Blank ballots	385	1.45	+0.10		
**Total**	**26,484**			**21**	**±0**
Valid votes	26,484	99.44	+0.11		
Invalid votes	149	0.56	−0.11		
**Votes cast / turnout**	**26,633**	**75.10**	**+8.05**		
Abstentions	8,830	24.90	−8.05		
**Registered voters**	**35,463**				

=== Guadalajara ===
Population: 67,401

← Summary of the 28 May 1995 City Council of Guadalajara election results →
Parties and alliances	Popular vote			Seats	
Parties and alliances	Votes	%	±pp	Total	+/−
People's Party (PP)	19,149	50.79	+7.08	**14**	+2
Spanish Socialist Workers' Party (PSOE)	9,059	24.03	−13.48	**6**	−4
United Left–Left of Castilla–La Mancha (IU–ICAM)	7,409	19.65	+8.60	**5**	+2
Guadalajara Independent Union (UIG)	637	1.69	New	0	±0
Democratic and Social Centre–Centrist Union (CDS–UC)	281	0.75	−3.47	0	±0
Regionalist Party of Guadalajara (PRGU)	264	0.70	−0.72	0	±0
Spanish Phalanx of the CNSO (FE–JONS)	116	0.31	New	0	±0
Blank ballots	790	2.10	+0.01		
**Total**	**37,705**			**25**	**±0**
Valid votes	37,705	99.19	+0.51		
Invalid votes	308	0.81	−0.51		
**Votes cast / turnout**	**38,013**	**73.39**	**+8.03**		
Abstentions	13,781	26.61	−8.03		
**Registered voters**	**51,794**				

=== Talavera de la Reina ===
Population: 75,138

← Summary of the 28 May 1995 City Council of Talavera de la Reina election results →
Parties and alliances	Popular vote			Seats	
Parties and alliances	Votes	%	±pp	Total	+/−
People's Party (PP)	16,076	42.13	+12.42	**11**	+3
Spanish Socialist Workers' Party (PSOE)	13,820	36.22	−6.45	**10**	−2
Action for Talavera Region (ACTAL)	4,058	10.64	−5.47	**2**	−2
United Left–Left of Castilla–La Mancha (IU–ICAM)	2,910	7.63	+1.80	**2**	+1
Talavera Neighbourhood Initiative (IVT)	407	1.07	New	0	±0
Centrist Union (UC)	225	0.59	−2.23	0	±0
Blank ballots	659	1.73	+0.41		
**Total**	**38,155**			**25**	**±0**
Valid votes	38,155	98.75	+0.19		
Invalid votes	484	1.25	−0.19		
**Votes cast / turnout**	**38,639**	**69.91**	**+6.76**		
Abstentions	16,629	30.09	−6.76		
**Registered voters**	**55,268**				

=== Toledo ===
Population: 64,040

← Summary of the 28 May 1995 City Council of Toledo election results →
Parties and alliances	Popular vote			Seats	
Parties and alliances	Votes	%	±pp	Total	+/−
People's Party (PP)	17,952	49.54	+5.70	**13**	+1
Spanish Socialist Workers' Party (PSOE)	13,234	36.52	−5.16	**10**	−1
United Left–Left of Castilla–La Mancha (IU–ICAM)	3,789	10.46	−0.07	**2**	±0
The Greens–Green Group (LV–GV)	419	1.16	New	0	±0
Centrist Union (UC)	170	0.47	−1.42	0	±0
Spanish Phalanx of the CNSO (FE–JONS)	66	0.18	New	0	±0
Independent Regional Unity (URI)	29	0.08	New	0	±0
Regionalist Party of Castilla–La Mancha (PRCM)	0	0.00	−0.82	0	±0
Blank ballots	581	1.60	+0.37		
**Total**	**36,240**			**25**	**±0**
Valid votes	36,240	99.42	−0.05		
Invalid votes	213	0.58	+0.05		
**Votes cast / turnout**	**36,453**	**73.90**	**+10.13**		
Abstentions	12,874	26.10	−10.13		
**Registered voters**	**49,327**				

== See also ==
- 1995 Castilian-Manchegan regional election
