= Guadalajara (Congress of Deputies constituency) =

Electoral constituency in Spain

Coordinates: 40°50′N 2°30′W

- Congress of Deputies; Electoral constituency
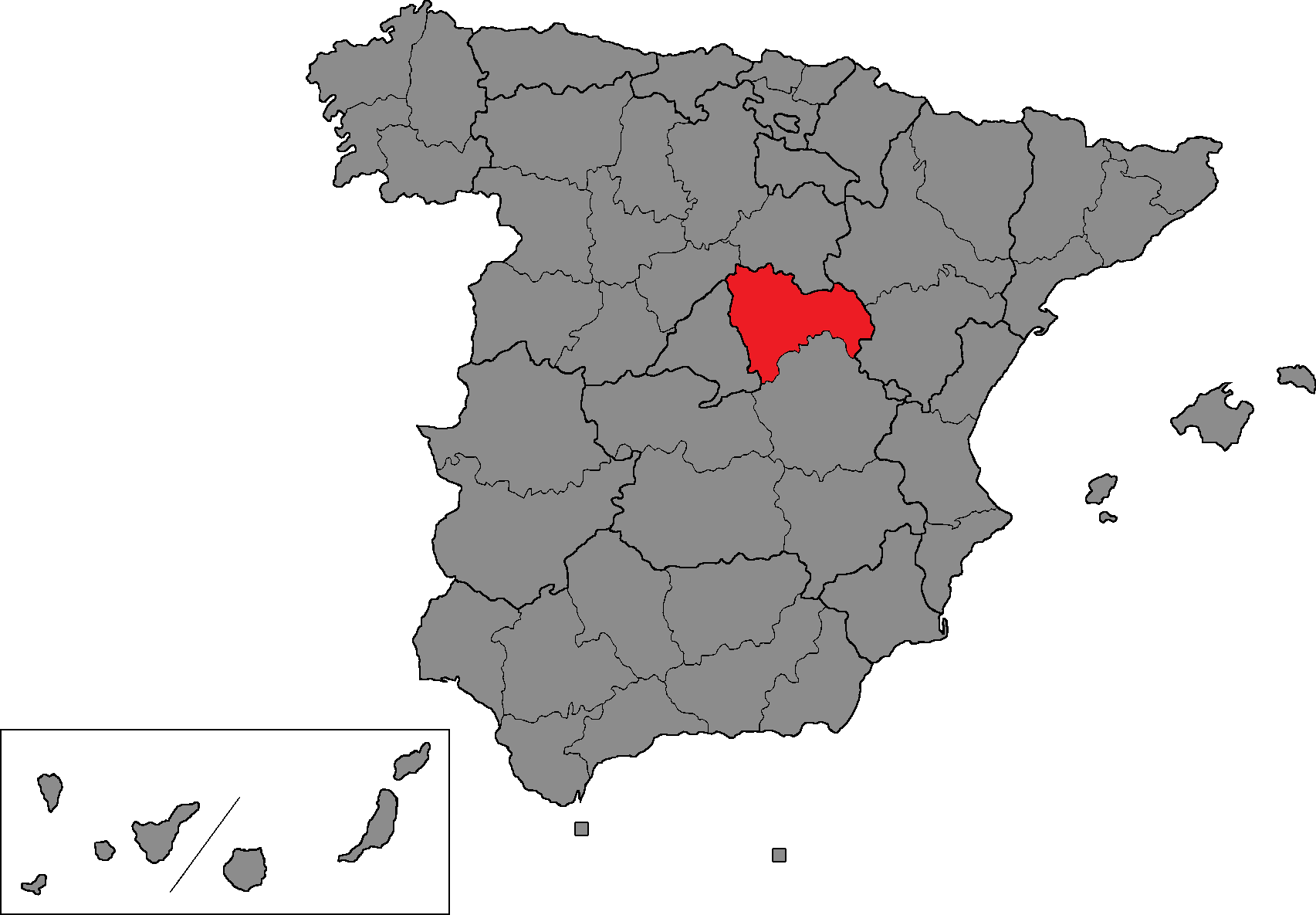
- Location of Guadalajara within Spain
- Province: Guadalajara
- Autonomous community: Castilla–La Mancha
- Population: ▲279,860 (2024)
- Electorate: ▲196,983 (2023)
- Major settlements: Guadalajara

Current constituency
- Created: 1977
- Seats: 3
- Members: PP (1); PSOE (1); Vox (1)

Guadalajara is one of the 52 constituencies represented in the Congress of Deputies, the lower chamber of the Spanish parliament, the Cortes Generales. The constituency (whose boundaries correspond to those of the homonymous province) currently elects three deputies. The electoral system uses the D'Hondt method and closed-list proportional voting, with a minimum threshold of three percent.

== Electoral system ==
The constituency was created as per the Political Reform Law and was first contested in the 1977 general election. The Law provided for the provinces of Spain to be established as multi-member districts in the Congress of Deputies, with this regulation being maintained under the Spanish Constitution of 1978. Additionally, the Constitution requires for any modification of the provincial limits to be approved under an organic law, needing an absolute majority in the Cortes Generales.

Voting is based on universal suffrage, comprising all Spanish nationals over 18 years of age with full political rights, provided that they have not been deprived of the right to vote by a final sentence. The only exception was in 1977, when this was limited to nationals over 21 years of age and in full enjoyment of their political and civil rights. Amendments in 2011 required non-resident citizens to apply for voting, a system known as "begged" voting (Spanish: Voto rogado). which was abolished in 2022. Further, amendments in 2018 granted the right to vote to those legally incapacitated. The Congress of Deputies has a minimum of 300 and a maximum of 400 seats, with electoral provisions fixing its size at 350. Of these, 348 are elected in 50 multi-member constituencies corresponding to the provinces of Spain—each of which is assigned an initial minimum of two seats and the remaining 248 distributed in proportion to population—using the D'Hondt method and closed-list proportional voting, with a three percent-threshold of valid votes (including blank ballots) in each constituency. The remaining two seats are allocated to Ceuta and Melilla as single-member districts elected by plurality voting. The use of this electoral method may result in a higher effective threshold depending on district magnitude and vote distribution. The law does not provide for by-elections to fill vacant seats; instead, any vacancies arising after the proclamation of candidates and during the legislative term are filled by the next candidates on the party lists or, when required, by designated substitutes.

The electoral law allows for parties and federations registered in the interior ministry, alliances and groupings of electors to present lists of candidates. Parties and federations intending to form an alliance are required to inform the relevant electoral commission within 10 days of the election call—15 before 1985—whereas groupings of electors need to secure the signature of at least one percent of the electorate in the constituencies for which they seek election—one permille of the electorate, with a compulsory minimum of 500 signatures, until 1985—disallowing electors from signing for more than one list. Also since 2011, parties, federations or alliances that have not obtained a mandate in either chamber of the Cortes at the preceding election are required to secure the signature of at least 0.1 percent of electors in the aforementioned constituencies. Amendments in 2007 required a balanced composition of men and women in the electoral lists, so that candidates of either sex made up at least 40 percent of the total composition; further amendments in 2024 required the use of a zipper system.

== Deputies ==
Deputies 1977–present
Key to parties PSOE Cs UCD PP CP AP Vox
Legislature	Election	Distribution
Constituent	1977	1 / 2
1st	1979	1 / 2
2nd	1982	2 / 1
3rd	1986	1 / 2
4th	1989	1 / 2
5th	1993	1 / 2
6th	1996	1 / 2
7th	2000	1 / 2
8th	2004	1 / 2
9th	2008	1 / 2
10th	2011	1 / 2
11th	2015	1 / 1 / 1
12th	2016	1 / 2
13th	2019 (Apr)	1 / 1 / 1
14th	2019 (Nov)	1 / 1 / 1
15th	2023	1 / 1 / 1

== General elections ==
=== 2026 ===
Summary of the 29 November 2026 Congress of Deputies election results in Guadalajara
Parties and alliances	Popular vote			Seats	
Parties and alliances	Votes	%	±pp	Total	+/−
People's Party (PP)					
Spanish Socialist Workers' Party (PSOE)					
Vox (Vox)					
Broad Front (FA)^{1}			n/a		
We Can (Podemos)^{1}			n/a		
Workers' Front (FO)					
For a Fairer World (M+J)					
Communist Party of the Workers of Spain (PCTE)					
Spanish Phalanx of the CNSO (FE de las JONS)					
The Party is Over (SALF)			New		
Blank ballots					
Total				3	±0
Valid votes					
Invalid votes					
Votes cast / turnout					
Abstentions					
Registered voters	208,773				
Sources
Footnotes: ^{1} Within the Unite alliance in the 2023 election.

=== 2023 ===
Summary of the 23 July 2023 Congress of Deputies election results in Guadalajara
Parties and alliances	Popular vote			Seats	
Parties and alliances	Votes	%	±pp	Total	+/−
People's Party (PP)	51,195	36.33	+13.29	1	±0
Spanish Socialist Workers' Party (PSOE)	46,479	32.98	+1.83	1	±0
Vox (Vox)	27,126	19.25	–4.72	1	±0
Unite (Sumar)^{1}	12,907	9.16	–2.11	0	±0
Animalist Party with the Environment (PACMA)^{2}	1,039	0.74	–0.22	0	±0
Workers' Front (FO)	304	0.22	New	0	±0
For a Fairer World (PUM+J)	249	0.18	–0.03	0	±0
Communist Party of the Workers of Spain (PCTE)	191	0.14	+0.06	0	±0
Zero Cuts (Recortes Cero)	162	0.11	–0.11	0	±0
Spanish Phalanx of the CNSO (FE de las JONS)	118	0.08	–0.06	0	±0
Blank ballots	1,143	0.81	–0.06		
Total	140,913			3	±0
Valid votes	140,913	98.72	–0.05		
Invalid votes	1,831	1.28	+0.05		
Votes cast / turnout	142,744	72.47	+1.06		
Abstentions	54,239	27.53	–1.06		
Registered voters	196,983				
Sources
Footnotes: ^{1} Unite results are compared to United We Can totals in the November 2019 election.; ^{2} Animalist Party with the Environment results are compared to Animalist Party Against Mistreatment of Animals totals in the November 2019 election.

=== November 2019 ===
Summary of the 10 November 2019 Congress of Deputies election results in Guadalajara
Parties and alliances	Popular vote			Seats	
Parties and alliances	Votes	%	±pp	Total	+/−
Spanish Socialist Workers' Party (PSOE)	41,167	31.15	+1.35	1	±0
Vox (Vox)	31,683	23.97	+7.50	1	+1
People's Party (PP)	30,443	23.04	+2.99	1	±0
United We Can (Podemos–IU)	14,897	11.27	–1.01	0	±0
Citizens–Party of the Citizenry (Cs)	10,169	7.69	–11.10	0	–1
Animalist Party Against Mistreatment of Animals (PACMA)	1,266	0.96	–0.31	0	±0
Zero Cuts–Green Group–PCAS–TC (Recortes Cero–GV–PCAS–TC)	287	0.22	–0.01	0	±0
For a Fairer World (PUM+J)	284	0.21	+0.03	0	±0
European Retirees Social Democratic Party (PDSJE)	234	0.18	New	0	±0
Spanish Communist Workers' Party (PCOE)	195	0.15	–0.08	0	±0
Spanish Phalanx of the CNSO (FE de las JONS)	188	0.14	New	0	±0
Communist Party of the Workers of Spain (PCTE)	106	0.08	New	0	±0
Communist Party of the Peoples of Spain (PCPE)	87	0.07	New	0	±0
Blank ballots	1,148	0.87	+0.17		
Total	132,154			3	±0
Valid votes	132,154	98.77	+0.09		
Invalid votes	1,642	1.23	–0.09		
Votes cast / turnout	133,796	71.41	–6.13		
Abstentions	53,575	28.59	+6.13		
Registered voters	187,371				

=== April 2019 ===
Summary of the 28 April 2019 Congress of Deputies election results in Guadalajara
Parties and alliances	Popular vote			Seats	
Parties and alliances	Votes	%	±pp	Total	+/−
Spanish Socialist Workers' Party (PSOE)	42,521	29.80	+6.78	1	±0
People's Party (PP)	28,618	20.05	–19.52	1	–1
Citizens–Party of the Citizenry (Cs)	26,817	18.79	+2.38	1	+1
Vox (Vox)	23,501	16.47	+16.06	0	±0
United We Can (Podemos–IU–Equo)	17,524	12.28	–5.88	0	±0
Animalist Party Against Mistreatment of Animals (PACMA)	1,816	1.27	+0.24	0	±0
Zero Cuts–Green Group–PCAS–TC (Recortes Cero–GV–PCAS–TC)	335	0.23	+0.04	0	±0
Spanish Communist Workers' Party (PCOE)	325	0.23	+0.13	0	±0
For a Fairer World (PUM+J)	254	0.18	New	0	±0
Blank ballots	996	0.70	+0.08		
Total	142,707			3	±0
Valid votes	142,707	98.68	–0.29		
Invalid votes	1,904	1.32	+0.29		
Votes cast / turnout	144,611	77.54	+4.68		
Abstentions	41,896	22.46	–4.68		
Registered voters	186,507				

=== 2016 ===
Summary of the 26 June 2016 Congress of Deputies election results in Guadalajara
Parties and alliances	Popular vote			Seats	
Parties and alliances	Votes	%	±pp	Total	+/−
People's Party (PP)	52,047	39.57	+4.81	2	+1
Spanish Socialist Workers' Party (PSOE)	30,282	23.02	+0.50	1	±0
United We Can (Podemos–IU–Equo)^{1}	23,884	18.16	–3.46	0	±0
Citizens–Party of the Citizenry (C's)	21,586	16.41	–1.64	0	–1
Animalist Party Against Mistreatment of Animals (PACMA)	1,349	1.03	+0.18	0	±0
Vox (Vox)	541	0.41	–0.06	0	±0
Union, Progress and Democracy (UPyD)	413	0.31	–0.44	0	±0
Zero Cuts–Green Group (Recortes Cero–GV)	245	0.19	–0.02	0	±0
Spanish Phalanx of the CNSO (FE de las JONS)	206	0.16	New	0	±0
Spanish Communist Workers' Party (PCOE)	126	0.10	New	0	±0
Internationalist Solidarity and Self-Management (SAIn)	37	0.03	–0.03	0	±0
Blank ballots	822	0.62	–0.10		
Total	131,538			3	±0
Valid votes	131,538	98.97	+0.10		
Invalid votes	1,365	1.03	–0.10		
Votes cast / turnout	132,903	72.86	–2.74		
Abstentions	49,505	27.14	+2.74		
Registered voters	182,408				
Sources
Footnotes: ^{1} United We Can results are compared to the combined totals of We Can and United Left–Popular Unity in Common in the 2015 election.

=== 2015 ===
Summary of the 20 December 2015 Congress of Deputies election results in Guadalajara
Parties and alliances	Popular vote			Seats	
Parties and alliances	Votes	%	±pp	Total	+/−
People's Party (PP)	47,365	34.76	–19.24	1	–1
Spanish Socialist Workers' Party (PSOE)	30,685	22.52	–5.17	1	±0
Citizens–Party of the Citizenry (C's)	24,603	18.05	New	1	+1
We Can (Podemos)	23,827	17.49	New	0	±0
United Left–Popular Unity in Common (IU–UPeC)	5,628	4.13	–2.71	0	±0
Animalist Party Against Mistreatment of Animals (PACMA)	1,152	0.85	+0.38	0	±0
Union, Progress and Democracy (UPyD)	1,026	0.75	–6.78	0	±0
Vox (Vox)	645	0.47	New	0	±0
Zero Cuts–Green Group (Recortes Cero–GV)	283	0.21	New	0	±0
Internationalist Solidarity and Self-Management (SAIn)	75	0.06	New	0	±0
Blank ballots	979	0.72	–0.62		
Total	136,268			3	±0
Valid votes	136,268	98.87	+0.51		
Invalid votes	1,562	1.13	–0.51		
Votes cast / turnout	137,830	75.60	+0.78		
Abstentions	44,491	24.40	–0.78		
Registered voters	182,321				

=== 2011 ===
Summary of the 20 November 2011 Congress of Deputies election results in Guadalajara
Parties and alliances	Popular vote			Seats	
Parties and alliances	Votes	%	±pp	Total	+/−
People's Party (PP)	71,362	54.00	+3.35	2	±0
Spanish Socialist Workers' Party (PSOE)	36,589	27.69	–13.28	1	±0
Union, Progress and Democracy (UPyD)	9,947	7.53	+5.42	0	±0
United Left of Castilla–La Mancha–The Greens: Plural Left (IUCLM–LV)	9,036	6.84	+3.55	0	±0
Equo (Equo)	1,273	0.96	New	0	±0
Animalist Party Against Mistreatment of Animals (PACMA)	620	0.47	+0.24	0	±0
Blank Seats (EB)	498	0.38	New	0	±0
National Democracy (DN)	471	0.36	+0.25	0	±0
Castilian Party (PCAS)^{1}	197	0.15	+0.06	0	±0
Anti-capitalists (Anticapitalistas)	194	0.15	New	0	±0
Citizens of Democratic Centre (CCD)	99	0.07	New	0	±0
Communist Unification of Spain (UCE)	92	0.07	New	0	±0
Blank ballots	1,776	1.34	+0.30		
Total	132,154			3	±0
Valid votes	132,154	98.36	–0.90		
Invalid votes	2,197	1.64	+0.90		
Votes cast / turnout	134,351	74.82	–5.06		
Abstentions	45,219	25.18	+5.06		
Registered voters	179,570				
Sources
Footnotes: ^{1} Castilian Party results are compared to Commoners' Land totals in the 2008 election.

=== 2008 ===
Summary of the 9 March 2008 Congress of Deputies election results in Guadalajara
Parties and alliances	Popular vote			Seats	
Parties and alliances	Votes	%	±pp	Total	+/−
People's Party (PP)	67,668	50.65	+3.07	2	±0
Spanish Socialist Workers' Party (PSOE)	54,738	40.97	–3.14	1	±0
United Left–Alternative (IU)	4,390	3.29	–1.14	0	±0
Union, Progress and Democracy (UPyD)	2,820	2.11	New	0	±0
The Greens of Europe (LVdE)	563	0.42	New	0	±0
Anti-Bullfighting Party Against Mistreatment of Animals (PACMA)	308	0.23	New	0	±0
Humanist Party (PH)	243	0.18	+0.09	0	±0
Social Democratic Party (PSD)	172	0.13	New	0	±0
Citizens for Blank Votes (CenB)	163	0.12	–0.30	0	±0
Regionalist Party of Guadalajara (PRGU)	152	0.11	–0.17	0	±0
National Democracy (DN)	146	0.11	+0.01	0	±0
Citizens–Party of the Citizenry (C's)	126	0.09	New	0	±0
Commoners' Land (TC)	123	0.09	–0.04	0	±0
Communist Party of the Peoples of Spain (PCPE)	106	0.08	+0.02	0	±0
For a Fairer World (PUM+J)	104	0.08	New	0	±0
Spanish Phalanx of the CNSO (FE de las JONS)	91	0.07	–0.01	0	±0
Spanish Alternative (AES)	60	0.04	New	0	±0
Spanish Democratic Centre (CDEs)	57	0.04	New	0	±0
Authentic Phalanx (FA)	56	0.04	±0.00	0	±0
Spanish Front (Frente)	39	0.03	New	0	±0
Spain 2000 (E–2000)	36	0.03	New	0	±0
Family and Life Party (PFyV)	32	0.02	–0.12	0	±0
Carlist Traditionalist Communion (CTC)	9	0.01	New	0	±0
Blank ballots	1,396	1.04	–1.08		
Total	133,598			3	±0
Valid votes	133,598	99.26	+0.20		
Invalid votes	990	0.74	–0.20		
Votes cast / turnout	134,588	79.88	–0.27		
Abstentions	33,898	20.12	+0.27		
Registered voters	168,486				

=== 2004 ===
Summary of the 14 March 2004 Congress of Deputies election results in Guadalajara
Parties and alliances	Popular vote			Seats	
Parties and alliances	Votes	%	±pp	Total	+/−
People's Party (PP)	57,078	47.58	–6.80	2	±0
Spanish Socialist Workers' Party (PSOE)	52,915	44.11	+8.05	1	±0
United Left–Left of Castilla–La Mancha (IU–ICAM)	5,310	4.43	–1.41	0	±0
Citizens for Blank Votes (CenB)	504	0.42	New	0	±0
Regionalist Party of Guadalajara (PRGU)	330	0.28	–0.11	0	±0
Family and Life Party (PFyV)	172	0.14	New	0	±0
Democratic and Social Centre (CDS)	159	0.13	+0.01	0	±0
Commoners' Land–Castilian Nationalist Party (TC–PNC)	154	0.13	–0.11	0	±0
Spanish Democratic Party (PADE)	119	0.10	+0.06	0	±0
National Democracy (DN)	116	0.10	New	0	±0
Republican Left (IR)	113	0.09	New	0	±0
Humanist Party (PH)	107	0.09	–0.03	0	±0
Spanish Phalanx of the CNSO (FE de las JONS)	91	0.08	New	0	±0
Communist Party of the Peoples of Spain (PCPE)	73	0.06	New	0	±0
The Phalanx (FE)	70	0.06	–0.05	0	±0
Authentic Phalanx (FA)	46	0.04	New	0	±0
Spanish Absolute Honesty Political Group (GPHAE)	35	0.03	New	0	±0
Republican Social Movement (MSR)	28	0.02	New	0	±0
Blank ballots	2,544	2.12	+0.28		
Total	119,964			3	±0
Valid votes	119,964	99.06	+0.03		
Invalid votes	1,140	0.94	–0.03		
Votes cast / turnout	121,104	80.15	+4.68		
Abstentions	30,002	19.85	–4.68		
Registered voters	151,106				

=== 2000 ===
Summary of the 12 March 2000 Congress of Deputies election results in Guadalajara
Parties and alliances	Popular vote			Seats	
Parties and alliances	Votes	%	±pp	Total	+/−
People's Party (PP)	55,895	54.38	+2.51	2	±0
Spanish Socialist Workers' Party–Progressives (PSOE–p)	37,060	36.06	+1.13	1	±0
United Left (IU)	6,000	5.84	–4.87	0	±0
Liberal Independent Group (GIL)	645	0.63	New	0	±0
Regionalist Party of Guadalajara (PRGU)	400	0.39	+0.06	0	±0
Commoners' Land–Castilian Nationalist Party (TC–PNC)	244	0.24	+0.16	0	±0
Natural Law Party (PLN)	187	0.18	New	0	±0
Humanist Party (PH)	128	0.12	±0.00	0	±0
Centrist Union–Democratic and Social Centre (UC–CDS)	119	0.12	–0.20	0	±0
The Phalanx (FE)	114	0.11	New	0	±0
Spanish Democratic Party (PADE)	41	0.04	New	0	±0
Spain 2000 Platform (ES2000)	31	0.03	New	0	±0
Carlist Party (PC)	14	0.01	New	0	±0
Blank ballots	1,895	1.84	+0.51		
Total	102,782			3	±0
Valid votes	102,782	99.03	–0.27		
Invalid votes	1,002	0.97	+0.27		
Votes cast / turnout	103,784	75.47	–5.73		
Abstentions	33,739	24.53	+5.73		
Registered voters	137,523				

=== 1996 ===
Summary of the 3 March 1996 Congress of Deputies election results in Guadalajara
Parties and alliances	Popular vote			Seats	
Parties and alliances	Votes	%	±pp	Total	+/−
People's Party (PP)	53,683	51.87	+3.05	2	±0
Spanish Socialist Workers' Party (PSOE)	36,156	34.93	–1.66	1	±0
United Left–Left of Castilla–La Mancha (IU–ICAM)	11,080	10.71	+1.52	0	±0
Regionalist Party of Guadalajara (PRGU)	338	0.33	+0.05	0	±0
Centrist Union (UC)	333	0.32	–2.07	0	±0
Authentic Spanish Phalanx (FEA)	138	0.13	New	0	±0
Humanist Party (PH)	121	0.12	+0.08	0	±0
Workers' Revolutionary Party (PRT)	96	0.09	New	0	±0
Commoners' Land–Castilian Nationalist Party (TC–PNC)	87	0.08	–0.03	0	±0
Regionalist Party of Castilla–La Mancha (PRCM)	84	0.08	New	0	±0
Blank ballots	1,380	1.33	+0.21		
Total	103,496			3	±0
Valid votes	103,496	99.30	–0.05		
Invalid votes	726	0.70	+0.05		
Votes cast / turnout	104,222	81.20	+0.31		
Abstentions	24,130	18.80	–0.31		
Registered voters	128,352				

=== 1993 ===
Summary of the 6 June 1993 Congress of Deputies election results in Guadalajara
Parties and alliances	Popular vote			Seats	
Parties and alliances	Votes	%	±pp	Total	+/−
People's Party (PP)	46,908	48.82	+6.07	2	±0
Spanish Socialist Workers' Party (PSOE)	35,163	36.59	+0.08	1	±0
United Left (IU)	8,826	9.19	+0.79	0	±0
Democratic and Social Centre (CDS)	2,300	2.39	–5.25	0	±0
The Greens (Verdes)^{1}	647	0.67	–0.05	0	±0
Ruiz-Mateos Group–Independent Party–Social Movement (ARM–PAI–MAS)	311	0.32	–0.37	0	±0
The Ecologists (LE)	308	0.32	–0.22	0	±0
Regionalist Party of Guadalajara (PRGU)	267	0.28	–0.21	0	±0
Commoners' Land–Castilian Nationalist Party (TC–PNC)	104	0.11	New	0	±0
Spanish Phalanx of the CNSO (FE–JONS)	75	0.08	–0.13	0	±0
Coalition for a New Socialist Party (CNPS)^{1}	39	0.04	–0.03	0	±0
Humanist Party (PH)	37	0.04	–0.05	0	±0
Natural Law Party (PLN)	34	0.04	New	0	±0
Communist Unification of Spain (UCE)	0	0.00	New	0	±0
Blank ballots	1,072	1.12	+0.20		
Total	96,091			3	±0
Valid votes	96,091	99.35	+0.21		
Invalid votes	630	0.65	–0.21		
Votes cast / turnout	96,721	80.89	+5.29		
Abstentions	22,844	19.11	–5.29		
Registered voters	119,565				
Sources
Footnotes: ^{1} The Greens results are compared to The Greens–Green List totals in the 1989 election.; ^{2} Coalition for a New Socialist Party results are compared to Alliance for the Republic totals in the 1989 election.

=== 1989 ===
Summary of the 29 October 1989 Congress of Deputies election results in Guadalajara
Parties and alliances	Popular vote			Seats	
Parties and alliances	Votes	%	±pp	Total	+/−
People's Party (PP)^{1}	37,061	42.75	+0.83	2	±0
Spanish Socialist Workers' Party (PSOE)	31,653	36.51	–1.57	1	±0
United Left (IU)	7,280	8.40	+3.74	0	±0
Democratic and Social Centre (CDS)	6,622	7.64	–3.26	0	±0
The Greens–Green List (LV–LV)	620	0.72	New	0	±0
Ruiz-Mateos Group (Ruiz-Mateos)	601	0.69	New	0	±0
Workers' Socialist Party (PST)	492	0.57	–0.02	0	±0
The Ecologist Greens (LVE)	467	0.54	New	0	±0
Regionalist Party of Guadalajara (PRGU)	426	0.49	New	0	±0
Workers' Party of Spain–Communist Unity (PTE–UC)^{2}	201	0.23	–0.55	0	±0
Spanish Phalanx of the CNSO (FE–JONS)	182	0.21	–0.35	0	±0
Humanist Party (PH)	79	0.09	New	0	±0
Centrist Unity–Democratic Spanish Party (PED)	78	0.09	New	0	±0
Communist Party of the Peoples of Spain (PCPE)	74	0.09	New	0	±0
Alliance for the Republic (AxR)^{3}	58	0.07	–0.12	0	±0
Blank ballots	796	0.92	+0.16		
Total	86,690			3	±0
Valid votes	86,690	99.14	+0.77		
Invalid votes	750	0.86	–0.77		
Votes cast / turnout	87,440	75.60	–0.47		
Abstentions	28,217	24.40	+0.47		
Registered voters	115,657				
Sources
Footnotes: ^{1} People's Party results are compared to People's Coalition totals in the 1986 election.; ^{2} Workers' Party of Spain–Communist Unity results are compared to Communists' Unity Board totals in the 1986 election.; ^{3} Alliance for the Republic results are compared to Internationalist Socialist Workers' Party totals in the 1986 election.

=== 1986 ===
Summary of the 22 June 1986 Congress of Deputies election results in Guadalajara
Parties and alliances	Popular vote			Seats	
Parties and alliances	Votes	%	±pp	Total	+/−
People's Coalition (AP–PDP–PL)^{1}	36,174	41.92	+4.26	2	+1
Spanish Socialist Workers' Party (PSOE)	32,855	38.08	–0.10	1	–1
Democratic and Social Centre (CDS)	9,407	10.90	+7.64	0	±0
United Left (IU)^{2}	4,024	4.66	+0.87	0	±0
Democratic Reformist Party (PRD)	928	1.08	New	0	±0
Communists' Unity Board (MUC)	670	0.78	New	0	±0
Workers' Socialist Party (PST)	505	0.59	–0.49	0	±0
Spanish Phalanx of the CNSO (FE–JONS)	479	0.56	+0.15	0	±0
Communist Unification of Spain (UCE)	204	0.24	+0.13	0	±0
Internationalist Socialist Workers' Party (POSI)	160	0.19	New	0	±0
Republican Popular Unity (UPR)^{3}	143	0.17	+0.11	0	±0
Party of the Communists of Catalonia (PCC)	85	0.10	New	0	±0
Blank ballots	655	0.76	–0.01		
Total	86,289			3	±0
Valid votes	86,289	98.37	+0.09		
Invalid votes	1,434	1.63	–0.09		
Votes cast / turnout	87,723	76.07	–8.26		
Abstentions	27,598	23.93	+8.26		
Registered voters	115,321				
Sources
Footnotes: ^{1} People's Coalition results are compared to People's Alliance–People's Democratic Party totals in the 1982 election.; ^{2} United Left results are compared to Communist Party of Spain totals in the 1982 election.; ^{3} Republican Popular Unity results are compared to Communist Party of Spain (Marxist–Leninist) totals in the 1982 election.

=== 1982 ===
Summary of the 28 October 1982 Congress of Deputies election results in Guadalajara
Parties and alliances	Popular vote			Seats	
Parties and alliances	Votes	%	±pp	Total	+/−
Spanish Socialist Workers' Party (PSOE)	34,212	38.18	+14.74	2	+1
People's Alliance–People's Democratic Party (AP–PDP)^{1}	33,748	37.66	+26.79	1	+1
Union of the Democratic Centre (UCD)	12,049	13.45	–33.49	0	–2
Communist Party of Spain (PCE)	3,392	3.79	–4.86	0	±0
Democratic and Social Centre (CDS)	2,919	3.26	New	0	±0
Workers' Socialist Party (PST)	971	1.08	New	0	±0
New Force (FN)^{2}	805	0.90	–5.72	0	±0
Spanish Phalanx of the CNSO (FE–JONS)	365	0.41	New	0	±0
Spanish Solidarity (SE)	136	0.15	New	0	±0
Communist Unification of Spain (UCE)	99	0.11	New	0	±0
Communist League–Internationalist Socialist Workers' Coalition (LC (COSI))	99	0.11	New	0	±0
Falangist Movement of Spain (MFE)	66	0.07	New	0	±0
Communist Party of Spain (Marxist–Leninist) (PCE (m–l))	56	0.06	New	0	±0
Blank ballots	693	0.77	+0.40		
Total	89,610			3	±0
Valid votes	89,610	98.28	–0.57		
Invalid votes	1,564	1.72	+0.57		
Votes cast / turnout	91,174	84.33	+11.84		
Abstentions	16,942	15.67	–11.84		
Registered voters	108,116				
Sources
Footnotes: ^{1} People's Alliance–People's Democratic Party results are compared to Democratic Coalition totals in the 1979 election.; ^{2} New Force results are compared to National Union totals in the 1979 election.

=== 1979 ===
Summary of the 1 March 1979 Congress of Deputies election results in Guadalajara
Parties and alliances	Popular vote			Seats	
Parties and alliances	Votes	%	±pp	Total	+/−
Union of the Democratic Centre (UCD)	36,361	46.94	–1.79	2	±0
Spanish Socialist Workers' Party (PSOE)^{1}	18,155	23.44	–0.49	1	±0
Democratic Coalition (CD)^{2}	8,416	10.87	–5.01	0	±0
Communist Party of Spain (PCE)	6,699	8.65	+1.81	0	±0
National Union (UN)^{3}	5,131	6.62	+2.92	0	±0
Spanish Socialist Workers' Party (historical) (PSOEh)	666	0.86	New	0	±0
Workers' Revolutionary Organization (ORT)	513	0.66	New	0	±0
Communist Organization of Spain (Red Flag) (OCE–BR)	421	0.54	New	0	±0
Party of Labour of Spain (PTE)^{4}	301	0.39	–0.26	0	±0
Authentic Spanish Phalanx (FEA)	246	0.32	New	0	±0
Spanish Phalanx of the CNSO (Authentic) (FE–JONS(A))	156	0.20	New	0	±0
Communist Movement–Organization of Communist Left (MC–OIC)	107	0.14	New	0	±0
Blank ballots	286	0.37	+0.12		
Total	77,458			3	±0
Valid votes	77,458	98.85	–0.08		
Invalid votes	899	1.15	+0.08		
Votes cast / turnout	78,357	72.49	–13.31		
Abstentions	29,738	27.51	+13.31		
Registered voters	108,095				
Sources
Footnotes: ^{1} Spanish Socialist Workers' Party results are compared to the combined totals of Spanish Socialist Workers' Party and People's Socialist Party–Socialist Unity in the 1977 election.; ^{2} Democratic Coalition results are compared to People's Alliance totals in the 1977 election.; ^{3} National Union results are compared to Spanish Phalanx of the CNSO totals in the 1977 election.; ^{4} Party of Labour of Spain results are compared to Democratic Left Front totals in the 1977 election.

=== 1977 ===
Summary of the 15 June 1977 Congress of Deputies election results in Guadalajara
Parties and alliances	Popular vote			Seats	
Parties and alliances	Votes	%	±pp	Total	+/−
Union of the Democratic Centre (UCD)	39,321	48.73	n/a	2	n/a
Spanish Socialist Workers' Party (PSOE)	17,133	21.23	n/a	1	n/a
People's Alliance (AP)	12,815	15.88	n/a	0	n/a
Communist Party of Spain (PCE)	5,521	6.84	n/a	0	n/a
Spanish Phalanx of the CNSO (FE–JONS)	2,989	3.70	n/a	0	n/a
People's Socialist Party–Socialist Unity (PSP–US)	2,182	2.70	n/a	0	n/a
Democratic Left Front (FDI)	526	0.65	n/a	0	n/a
Blank ballots	203	0.25	n/a		
Total	80,690			3	n/a
Valid votes	80,690	98.93	n/a		
Invalid votes	872	1.07	n/a		
Votes cast / turnout	81,562	85.80	n/a		
Abstentions	13,499	14.20	n/a		
Registered voters	95,061				

== Bibliography ==
- Ley 1/1977, de 4 de enero, para la Reforma Política (Fundamental Law 1/1977). Official State Gazette (in Spanish). 4 January 1977. BOE-A-1977-165.
- Real Decreto-ley 20/1977, de 18 de marzo, sobre Normas Electorales (Royal Decree-Law 20/1977). Official State Gazette (in Spanish). 18 March 1977. BOE-A-1977-7445.
- Constitución Española (Constitution). Official State Gazette (in Spanish). 27 December 1978. BOE-A-1978-31229.
- Ley Orgánica 5/1985, de 19 de junio, del Régimen Electoral General (Organic Law 5/1985). Official State Gazette (in Spanish). 19 June 1985. BOE-A-1985-11672.
- Carreras de Odriozola, Albert; Tafunell Sambola, Xavier (2005) [1989]. Estadísticas históricas de España, siglos XIX-XX (PDF) (in Spanish). Vol. 1 (II ed.). Bilbao: Fundación BBVA. pp. 1072–1097. ISBN 84-96515-00-1. Archived from the original (PDF) on 24 September 2015.
