= 1991 Spanish local elections in Castilla–La Mancha =

This article presents the results breakdown of the local elections held in Castilla–La Mancha on 26 May 1991. The following tables show detailed results in the autonomous community's most populous municipalities, sorted alphabetically.

== City control ==
The following table lists party control in the most populous municipalities, including provincial capitals (highlighted in bold). Gains for a party are highlighted in that party's colour.

Municipality	Population	Previous control	New control
**Albacete**	129,002	Spanish Socialist Workers' Party (PSOE)	Spanish Socialist Workers' Party (PSOE)
**Ciudad Real**	58,175	Spanish Socialist Workers' Party (PSOE)	Spanish Socialist Workers' Party (PSOE)
**Cuenca**	43,209	People's Party (PP)	Spanish Socialist Workers' Party (PSOE)
**Guadalajara**	63,581	Spanish Socialist Workers' Party (PSOE)	United Left (IU) (PP in 1992)
Talavera de la Reina	69,215	Democratic and Social Centre (CDS)	Spanish Socialist Workers' Party (PSOE)
**Toledo**	60,671	People's Party (PP)	Spanish Socialist Workers' Party (PSOE)

== Municipalities ==
=== Albacete ===
Population: 129,002

← Summary of the 26 May 1991 City Council of Albacete election results →
Parties and alliances	Popular vote			Seats	
Parties and alliances	Votes	%	±pp	Total	+/−
Spanish Socialist Workers' Party (PSOE)	25,957	47.58	+4.41	**14**	+1
People's Party (PP)^{1}	19,240	35.27	+1.95	**10**	+1
United Left (IU)	5,678	10.41	+2.57	**3**	+1
Democratic and Social Centre (CDS)	1,950	3.57	−8.64	0	−3
Manchegan Regionalist Party (PRM)	596	1.09	+0.73	0	±0
Left Platform (PCE (m–l)–CRPE)	205	0.38	New	0	±0
Blank ballots	928	1.70	+0.16		
**Total**	**54,554**			**27**	**±0**
Valid votes	54,554	99.10	+0.64		
Invalid votes	497	0.90	−0.64		
**Votes cast / turnout**	**55,051**	**58.51**	**−7.26**		
Abstentions	39,039	41.49	+7.26		
**Registered voters**	**94,090**				
Sources
Footnotes: ^{1} People's Party results are compared to the combined totals of People's Alliance and People's Democratic Party–Independent Farmers' Group in the 1987 election.

=== Ciudad Real ===
Population: 58,175

← Summary of the 26 May 1991 City Council of Ciudad Real election results →
Parties and alliances	Popular vote			Seats	
Parties and alliances	Votes	%	±pp	Total	+/−
Spanish Socialist Workers' Party (PSOE)	9,855	41.89	+22.72	**11**	+6
People's Party (PP)^{1}	9,260	39.36	+19.82	**10**	+5
United Left (IU)	1,795	7.63	+3.97	**2**	+2
Democratic and Social Centre (CDS)	1,709	7.26	+0.62	**2**	+1
Regionalist Unitary Party (PUR)	511	2.17	New	0	±0
Independent Group of Ciudad Real (AICR)	n/a	n/a	−48.89	0	−14
Blank ballots	394	1.67	+0.83		
**Total**	**23,524**			**25**	**±0**
Valid votes	23,524	98.81	+0.14		
Invalid votes	284	1.19	−0.14		
**Votes cast / turnout**	**23,808**	**56.51**	**−10.80**		
Abstentions	18,319	43.49	+10.80		
**Registered voters**	**42,127**				
Sources
Footnotes: ^{1} People's Party results are compared to People's Alliance totals in the 1987 election.

=== Cuenca ===
Population: 43,209

← Summary of the 26 May 1991 City Council of Cuenca election results →
Parties and alliances	Popular vote			Seats	
Parties and alliances	Votes	%	±pp	Total	+/−
Spanish Socialist Workers' Party (PSOE)	10,649	48.24	+2.17	**11**	±0
People's Party (PP)^{1}	9,373	42.46	−0.77	**10**	+1
United Left (IU)	891	4.04	+1.09	0	±0
Democratic and Social Centre (CDS)	530	2.40	−3.46	0	−1
Commoners' Land (TC)	335	1.52	New	0	±0
Blank ballots	298	1.35	+0.12		
**Total**	**22,076**			**21**	**±0**
Valid votes	22,076	99.33	+0.61		
Invalid votes	150	0.67	−0.61		
**Votes cast / turnout**	**22,226**	**67.05**	**−6.02**		
Abstentions	10,924	32.95	+6.02		
**Registered voters**	**33,150**				
Sources
Footnotes: ^{1} People's Party results are compared to the combined totals of People's Alliance, People's Democratic Party–Independent Farmers' Group and Liberal Party in the 1987 election.

=== Guadalajara ===
Population: 63,581

← Summary of the 26 May 1991 City Council of Guadalajara election results →
Parties and alliances	Popular vote			Seats	
Parties and alliances	Votes	%	±pp	Total	+/−
People's Party (PP)^{1}	13,404	43.71	+5.25	**12**	+2
Spanish Socialist Workers' Party (PSOE)	11,503	37.51	−1.29	**10**	±0
United Left (IU)	3,388	11.05	+3.69	**3**	+1
Democratic and Social Centre (CDS)	1,294	4.22	−8.13	0	−3
Regionalist Party of Guadalajara (PRGU)	434	1.42	New	0	±0
Blank ballots	642	2.09	+0.68		
**Total**	**30,665**			**25**	**±0**
Valid votes	30,665	98.68	+0.07		
Invalid votes	410	1.32	−0.07		
**Votes cast / turnout**	**31,075**	**65.36**	**−10.72**		
Abstentions	16,467	34.64	+10.72		
**Registered voters**	**47,542**				
Sources
Footnotes: ^{1} People's Party results are compared to the combined totals of People's Alliance and People's Democratic Party–Independent Farmers' Group in the 1987 election.

=== Talavera de la Reina ===
Population: 69,215

← Summary of the 26 May 1991 City Council of Talavera de la Reina election results →
Parties and alliances	Popular vote			Seats	
Parties and alliances	Votes	%	±pp	Total	+/−
Spanish Socialist Workers' Party (PSOE)	13,236	42.67	−1.14	**12**	±0
People's Party (PP)^{1}	9,215	29.71	+2.29	**8**	+2
Action for Talavera (ACTAL)	4,998	16.11	New	**4**	+4
United Left (IU)	1,807	5.83	−2.75	**1**	−1
Democratic and Social Centre (CDS)	875	2.82	−15.98	0	−5
The Greens Ecologist–Humanist List (LVLE–H)^{2}	479	1.54	+1.27	0	±0
Blank ballots	411	1.32	+0.20		
**Total**	**31,021**			**25**	**±0**
Valid votes	31,021	98.56	+1.06		
Invalid votes	452	1.44	−1.06		
**Votes cast / turnout**	**31,473**	**63.15**	**−9.48**		
Abstentions	18,369	36.85	+9.48		
**Registered voters**	**49,842**				
Sources
Footnotes: ^{1} People's Party results are compared to the combined totals of People's Alliance and People's Democratic Party–Independent Farmers' Group in the 1987 election.; ^{2} The Greens Ecologist–Humanist List results are compared to Humanist Platform totals in the 1987 election.

=== Toledo ===
Population: 60,671

← Summary of the 26 May 1991 City Council of Toledo election results →
Parties and alliances	Popular vote			Seats	
Parties and alliances	Votes	%	±pp	Total	+/−
People's Party (PP)^{1}	12,272	43.84	−0.54	**12**	+1
Spanish Socialist Workers' Party (PSOE)	11,667	41.68	+10.24	**11**	+2
United Left (IU)	2,948	10.53	−0.95	**2**	−1
Democratic and Social Centre (CDS)	530	1.89	−7.77	0	−2
Regionalist Party of Castilla–La Mancha (PRCM)	230	0.82	New	0	±0
Blank ballots	343	1.23	−0.02		
**Total**	**27,990**			**25**	**±0**
Valid votes	27,990	99.47	+0.96		
Invalid votes	150	0.53	−0.96		
**Votes cast / turnout**	**28,140**	**63.77**	**−4.32**		
Abstentions	15,986	36.23	+4.32		
**Registered voters**	**44,126**				
Sources
Footnotes: ^{1} People's Party results are compared to the combined totals of People's Alliance, People's Democratic Party–Independent Farmers' Group and Liberal Party in the 1987 election.

== See also ==
- 1991 Castilian-Manchegan regional election
