= 2007 Spanish local elections in Castilla–La Mancha =

This article presents the results breakdown of the local elections held in Castilla–La Mancha on 27 May 2007. The following tables show detailed results in the autonomous community's most populous municipalities, sorted alphabetically.

== City control ==
The following table lists party control in the most populous municipalities, including provincial capitals (shown in bold). Gains for a party are displayed with the cell's background shaded in that party's colour.

Municipality	Population	Previous control	New control
**Albacete**	161,508	Spanish Socialist Workers' Party (PSOE)	Spanish Socialist Workers' Party (PSOE)
**Ciudad Real**	70,124	People's Party (PP)	People's Party (PP)
**Cuenca**	51,205	Spanish Socialist Workers' Party (PSOE)	People's Party (PP)
**Guadalajara**	75,493	Spanish Socialist Workers' Party (PSOE)	People's Party (PP)
Talavera de la Reina	83,793	Spanish Socialist Workers' Party (PSOE)	Spanish Socialist Workers' Party (PSOE)
**Toledo**	77,601	People's Party (PP)	Spanish Socialist Workers' Party (PSOE)

== Municipalities ==
=== Albacete ===
Population: 161,508

← Summary of the 27 May 2007 City Council of Albacete election results →
Parties and alliances	Popular vote			Seats	
Parties and alliances	Votes	%	±pp	Total	+/−
Spanish Socialist Workers' Party (PSOE)	35,260	46.26	−1.38	**13**	−1
People's Party (PP)	33,121	43.46	+1.39	**13**	+1
United Left–Left of Castilla–La Mancha (IU–ICAM)	4,974	6.53	+0.46	**1**	±0
Manchegan Regionalist Party (PRM)	888	1.17	+0.04	0	±0
Humanist Party (PH)	268	0.35	−0.02	0	±0
Blank ballots	1,703	2.23	−0.48		
**Total**	**76,214**			**27**	**±0**
Valid votes	76,214	99.34	±0.00		
Invalid votes	504	0.66	±0.00		
**Votes cast / turnout**	**76,718**	**61.46**	**−3.83**		
Abstentions	48,105	38.54	+3.83		
**Registered voters**	**124,823**				

=== Ciudad Real ===
Population: 70,124

← Summary of the 27 May 2007 City Council of Ciudad Real election results →
Parties and alliances	Popular vote			Seats	
Parties and alliances	Votes	%	±pp	Total	+/−
People's Party (PP)	17,733	50.32	+4.94	**15**	+2
Spanish Socialist Workers' Party (PSOE)	12,937	36.71	−7.15	**10**	−2
United Left–Left of Castilla–La Mancha (IU–ICAM)	1,514	4.30	+0.32	0	±0
Independents for Ciudad Real (ICR)	1,391	3.95	New	0	±0
Castilian Unity (UdCa)	627	1.78	−1.51	0	±0
Liberal Democratic Centre (CDL)	119	0.34	New	0	±0
Blank ballots	922	2.62	−0.32		
**Total**	**35,243**			**25**	**±0**
Valid votes	35,243	99.27	+0.02		
Invalid votes	259	0.73	−0.02		
**Votes cast / turnout**	**35,502**	**65.53**	**−1.30**		
Abstentions	18,672	34.47	+1.30		
**Registered voters**	**54,174**				

=== Cuenca ===
Population: 51,205

← Summary of the 27 May 2007 City Council of Cuenca election results →
Parties and alliances	Popular vote			Seats	
Parties and alliances	Votes	%	±pp	Total	+/−
People's Party (PP)	12,392	46.97	+7.21	**13**	+4
Spanish Socialist Workers' Party (PSOE)	10,630	40.29	−4.85	**11**	±0
United Left–Left of Castilla–La Mancha (IU–ICAM)	1,323	5.01	+1.35	**1**	+1
Liberal Democratic Centre (CDL)	1,102	4.18	New	0	±0
Independents for Cuenca (ixC)	302	1.14	−6.86	0	−1
Commoners' Land (TC)	79	0.30	−0.04	0	±0
Blank ballots	557	2.11	−0.24		
**Total**	**26,385**			**25**	**+4**
Valid votes	26,385	99.26	+0.04		
Invalid votes	196	0.74	−0.04		
**Votes cast / turnout**	**26,581**	**65.58**	**−3.34**		
Abstentions	13,950	34.42	+3.34		
**Registered voters**	**40,531**				

=== Guadalajara ===
Population: 75,493

← Summary of the 27 May 2007 City Council of Guadalajara election results →
Parties and alliances	Popular vote			Seats	
Parties and alliances	Votes	%	±pp	Total	+/−
People's Party (PP)	18,987	49.66	+5.20	**13**	+1
Spanish Socialist Workers' Party (PSOE)	14,970	39.15	−4.69	**11**	−1
United Left–Left of Castilla–La Mancha (IU–ICAM)	2,314	6.05	−0.98	**1**	±0
Regionalist Party of Guadalajara (PRGU)	264	0.69	±0.00	0	±0
Anti-Bullfighting Party Against Mistreatment of Animals (PACMA)	232	0.61	New	0	±0
Spanish Democratic Party (PADE)	202	0.53	−0.21	0	±0
Commoners' Land (TC)	151	0.39	−0.09	0	±0
The Phalanx (FE)	141	0.37	New	0	±0
Blank ballots	976	2.55	+0.03		
**Total**	**38,237**			**25**	**±0**
Valid votes	38,237	99.02	−0.26		
Invalid votes	379	0.98	+0.26		
**Votes cast / turnout**	**38,616**	**67.07**	**−4.22**		
Abstentions	18,961	32.93	+4.22		
**Registered voters**	**57,577**				

=== Talavera de la Reina ===
Population: 83,793

← Summary of the 27 May 2007 City Council of Talavera de la Reina election results →
Parties and alliances	Popular vote			Seats	
Parties and alliances	Votes	%	±pp	Total	+/−
Spanish Socialist Workers' Party (PSOE)	19,610	50.16	−6.99	**14**	−1
People's Party (PP)	16,673	42.65	+6.14	**11**	+1
United Left–Left of Castilla–La Mancha (IU–ICAM)	1,621	4.15	+0.87	0	±0
Union of Independent Citizens of Toledo (UCIT)	438	1.12	New	0	±0
Commoners' Land (TC)	156	0.40	New	0	±0
Blank ballots	594	1.52	−0.23		
**Total**	**39,092**			**25**	**±0**
Valid votes	39,092	99.24	−0.07		
Invalid votes	298	0.76	+0.07		
**Votes cast / turnout**	**39,390**	**62.69**	**−4.99**		
Abstentions	23,439	37.31	+4.99		
**Registered voters**	**62,829**				

=== Toledo ===
Population: 77,601

← Summary of the 27 May 2007 City Council of Toledo election results →
Parties and alliances	Popular vote			Seats	
Parties and alliances	Votes	%	±pp	Total	+/−
People's Party (PP)	18,798	45.35	−1.85	**12**	−1
Spanish Socialist Workers' Party (PSOE)	18,011	43.45	+0.34	**11**	±0
United Left–Left of Castilla–La Mancha (IU–ICAM)	3,322	8.01	+1.77	**2**	+1
Spanish Democratic Party (PADE)	202	0.49	New	0	±0
Commoners' Land (TC)	198	0.48	+0.09	0	±0
Blank ballots	921	2.22	+0.05		
**Total**	**41,452**			**25**	**±0**
Valid votes	41,452	99.29	−0.05		
Invalid votes	298	0.71	+0.05		
**Votes cast / turnout**	**41,750**	**69.62**	**−0.62**		
Abstentions	18,215	30.38	+0.62		
**Registered voters**	**59,965**				

== See also ==
- 2007 Castilian-Manchegan regional election
