= 1999 Spanish local elections in Castilla–La Mancha =

This article presents the results breakdown of the local elections held in Castilla–La Mancha on 13 June 1999. The following tables show detailed results in the autonomous community's most populous municipalities, sorted alphabetically.

== City control ==
The following table lists party control in the most populous municipalities, including provincial capitals (highlighted in bold). Gains for a party are highlighted in that party's colour.

Municipality	Population	Previous control	New control
**Albacete**	145,454	People's Party (PP)	Spanish Socialist Workers' Party (PSOE)
**Ciudad Real**	61,138	People's Party (PP)	People's Party (PP)
**Cuenca**	44,558	People's Party (PP)	Spanish Socialist Workers' Party (PSOE)
**Guadalajara**	64,439	People's Party (PP)	People's Party (PP)
Talavera de la Reina	72,208	People's Party (PP)	Spanish Socialist Workers' Party (PSOE)
**Toledo**	66,989	People's Party (PP)	People's Party (PP)

== Municipalities ==
=== Albacete ===
Population: 145,454

← Summary of the 13 June 1999 City Council of Albacete election results →
Parties and alliances	Popular vote			Seats	
Parties and alliances	Votes	%	±pp	Total	+/−
Spanish Socialist Workers' Party–Progressives (PSOE–p)	32,515	44.63	+15.43	**13**	+5
People's Party (PP)	30,547	41.93	−9.59	**12**	−3
United Left–Left of Castilla–La Mancha (IU–ICAM)	5,920	8.13	−7.02	**2**	−2
Manchegan Regionalist Party (PRM)	1,001	1.37	+0.26	0	±0
Humanist Party (PH)	307	0.42	+0.23	0	±0
Blank ballots	2,570	3.53	+1.73		
**Total**	**72,860**			**27**	**±0**
Valid votes	72,860	99.16	−0.29		
Invalid votes	619	0.84	+0.29		
**Votes cast / turnout**	**73,479**	**62.96**	**−9.01**		
Abstentions	43,234	37.04	+9.01		
**Registered voters**	**116,713**				

=== Ciudad Real ===
Population: 61,138

← Summary of the 13 June 1999 City Council of Ciudad Real election results →
Parties and alliances	Popular vote			Seats	
Parties and alliances	Votes	%	±pp	Total	+/−
People's Party (PP)	16,886	51.72	−5.86	**15**	−1
Spanish Socialist Workers' Party–Progressives (PSOE–p)	12,136	37.17	+10.93	**10**	+3
United Left–Left of Castilla–La Mancha (IU–ICAM)	1,447	4.43	−6.36	0	−2
Regionalist Party of Castilla–La Mancha (PRCM)	602	1.84	−0.36	0	±0
Centrist Union–Democratic and Social Centre (UC–CDS)	371	1.14	−0.31	0	±0
Humanist Party (PH)	74	0.23	New	0	±0
Commoners' Land–Castilian Nationalist Party (TC–PNC)	65	0.20	New	0	±0
Blank ballots	1,067	3.27	+1.54		
**Total**	**32,648**			**25**	**±0**
Valid votes	32,648	99.04	−0.24		
Invalid votes	318	0.96	+0.24		
**Votes cast / turnout**	**32,966**	**65.40**	**−5.71**		
Abstentions	17,441	34.60	+5.71		
**Registered voters**	**50,407**				

=== Cuenca ===
Population: 44,558

← Summary of the 13 June 1999 City Council of Cuenca election results →
Parties and alliances	Popular vote			Seats	
Parties and alliances	Votes	%	±pp	Total	+/−
Spanish Socialist Workers' Party–Progressives (PSOE–p)	11,968	47.31	+6.91	**11**	+2
People's Party (PP)	10,939	43.24	−8.05	**10**	−1
United Left–Left of Castilla–La Mancha (IU–ICAM)	795	3.14	−2.07	0	−1
Commoners' Land–Castilian Nationalist Party (TC–PNC)	733	2.90	+2.40	0	±0
Centrist Union–Democratic and Social Centre (UC–CDS)	246	0.97	−0.17	0	±0
Humanist Party (PH)	41	0.16	New	0	±0
Blank ballots	574	2.27	+0.82		
**Total**	**25,296**			**21**	**±0**
Valid votes	25,296	99.20	−0.24		
Invalid votes	204	0.80	+0.24		
**Votes cast / turnout**	**25,500**	**70.71**	**−4.39**		
Abstentions	10,563	29.29	+4.39		
**Registered voters**	**36,063**				

=== Guadalajara ===
Population: 64,439

← Summary of the 13 June 1999 City Council of Guadalajara election results →
Parties and alliances	Popular vote			Seats	
Parties and alliances	Votes	%	±pp	Total	+/−
People's Party (PP)	15,771	46.71	−4.08	**13**	−1
Spanish Socialist Workers' Party–Progressives (PSOE–p)	12,896	38.19	+14.16	**10**	+4
United Left–Left of Castilla–La Mancha (IU–ICAM)	2,950	8.74	−10.91	**2**	−3
Regionalist Party of Guadalajara (PRGU)	369	1.09	+0.39	0	±0
Centrist Union–Democratic and Social Centre (UC–CDS)	232	0.69	−0.06	0	±0
Commoners' Land–Castilian Nationalist Party (TC–PNC)	175	0.52	New	0	±0
Humanist Party (PH)	93	0.28	New	0	±0
Blank ballots	1,279	3.79	+1.69		
**Total**	**33,765**			**25**	**±0**
Valid votes	33,765	98.90	−0.29		
Invalid votes	377	1.10	+0.29		
**Votes cast / turnout**	**34,142**	**65.56**	**−7.83**		
Abstentions	17,932	34.44	+7.83		
**Registered voters**	**52,074**				

=== Talavera de la Reina ===
Population: 72,208

← Summary of the 13 June 1999 City Council of Talavera de la Reina election results →
Parties and alliances	Popular vote			Seats	
Parties and alliances	Votes	%	±pp	Total	+/−
Spanish Socialist Workers' Party–Progressives (PSOE–p)	18,161	47.59	+11.37	**14**	+4
People's Party (PP)	15,053	39.44	−2.69	**11**	±0
United Left–Left of Castilla–La Mancha (IU–ICAM)	1,479	3.88	−3.75	0	−2
Action for Talavera Region (ACTAL)	1,469	3.85	−6.79	0	−2
Union of Talavera and Region (UTyC)	566	1.48	New	0	±0
Party of Self-employed of Spain and Spanish Independent Groups (PAE–I)	381	1.00	New	0	±0
Humanist Party (PH)	120	0.31	New	0	±0
Progressives for Talavera La Nueva Electoral Group (AEPTN)	0	0.00	New	0	±0
Blank ballots	934	2.45	+0.72		
**Total**	**38,163**			**25**	**±0**
Valid votes	38,163	99.21	+0.46		
Invalid votes	305	0.79	−0.46		
**Votes cast / turnout**	**38,468**	**67.93**	**−1.98**		
Abstentions	18,158	32.07	+1.98		
**Registered voters**	**56,626**				

=== Toledo ===
Population: 66,989

← Summary of the 13 June 1999 City Council of Toledo election results →
Parties and alliances	Popular vote			Seats	
Parties and alliances	Votes	%	±pp	Total	+/−
People's Party (PP)	16,716	45.61	−3.93	**13**	±0
Spanish Socialist Workers' Party–Progressives (PSOE–p)	15,359	41.91	+5.39	**11**	+1
United Left–Left of Castilla–La Mancha (IU–ICAM)	2,342	6.39	−4.07	**1**	−1
Spanish Democratic Party (PADE)	866	2.36	New	0	±0
Commoners' Land–Castilian Nationalist Party (TC–PNC)	169	0.46	New	0	±0
The Phalanx (FE)	112	0.31	New	0	±0
Humanist Party (PH)	62	0.17	New	0	±0
Blank ballots	1,022	2.79	+1.19		
**Total**	**36,648**			**25**	**±0**
Valid votes	36,648	99.21	−0.21		
Invalid votes	291	0.79	+0.21		
**Votes cast / turnout**	**36,939**	**68.63**	**−5.27**		
Abstentions	16,881	31.37	+5.27		
**Registered voters**	**53,820**				

== See also ==
- 1999 Castilian-Manchegan regional election
