= 2003 Spanish local elections =

- 25 May 2003 (Note: By-elections were held on 26 October 2003 in those constituencies where results were annulled by a final sentence following an electoral petition, or where elections were not held due to a lack of candidates.)

All 65,510 councillors in 8,108 municipal councils (Note: Including 50 seats in the assemblies of Ceuta and Melilla.) All 1,397 provincial/island seats in 44 provinces (Note: Including: 1,036 seats in 38 provincial deputations; 153 seats in 3 Basque foral deputations; 149 seats in 7 Canarian island cabildos; 59 seats in 3 Balearic island councils.)
- Registered: 34,386,462 ▲2.4%
- Turnout: 23,270,072 (67.7%) ▲3.7 pp
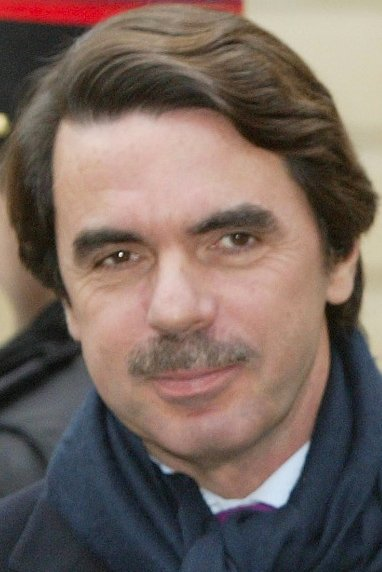

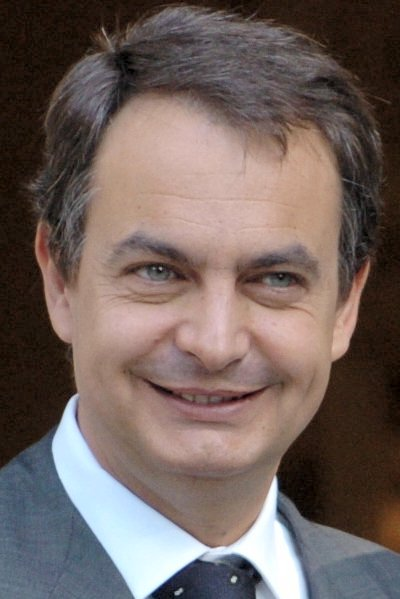

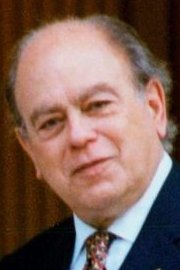

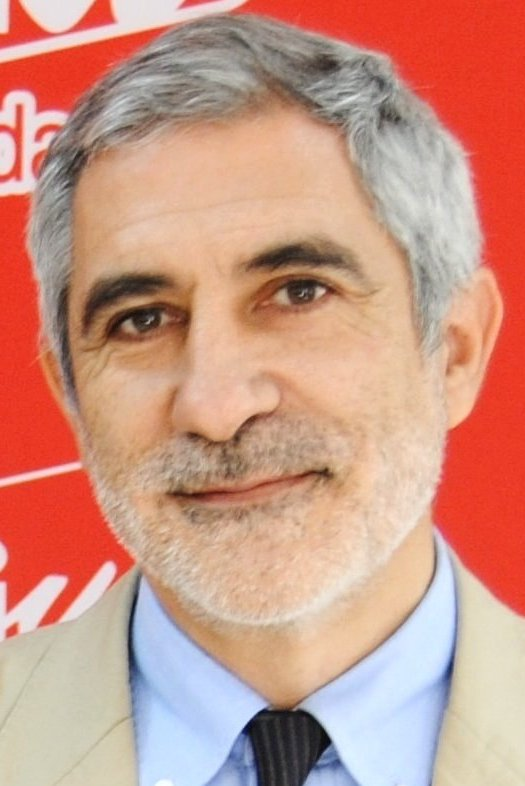

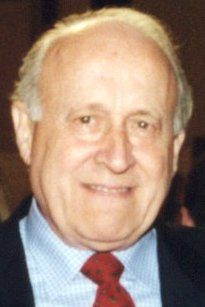

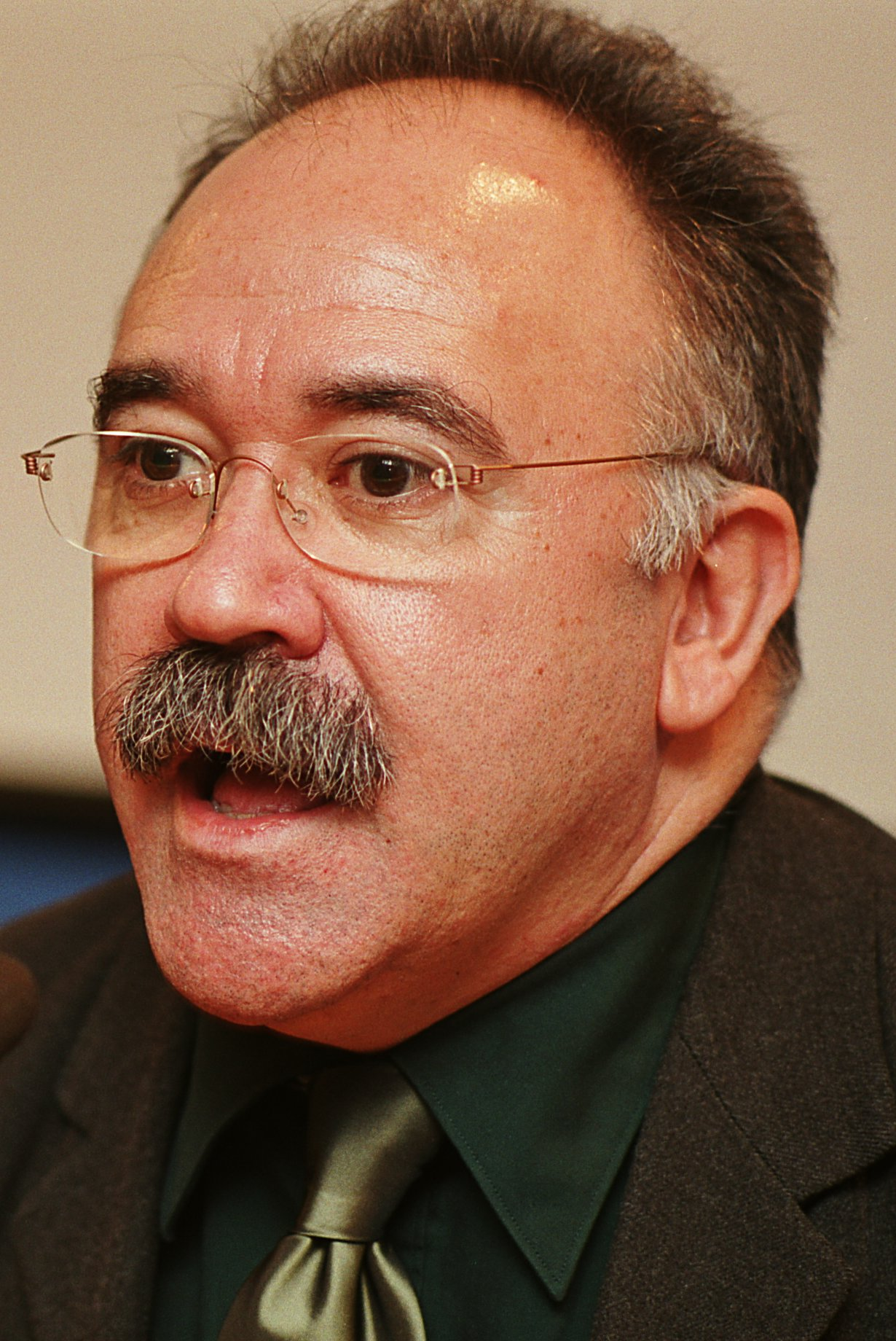
	First party	Second party	Third party
Leader	José María Aznar	José Luis Rodríguez Zapatero	Jordi Pujol
Party	PP	PSOE	CiU
Leader since	4 September 1989	22 July 2000	19 September 1978
Last election	24,626 c., 34.5% (Note: Results for PP (34.4%, 24,623 c. and 547 p.) and UPM (0.0%, 3 c. and 0 p.) in the 1999 elections.); 547 p.	21,984 c., 34.4% (Note: Results for PSOE (34.3%, 21,917 c. and 509 p.) and PDNI (0.1%, 67 c. and 0 p.) in the 1999 elections.); 509 p.	4,089 c., 3.6% 57 p.
Seats won	23,615 c. 527 p.	23,224 c. 555 p.	3,687 c. 50 p.
Seat change	▼1,011 c. ▼20 p.	▲1,240 c. ▲46 p.	▼402 c. ▼7 p.
Popular vote	7,875,762	7,999,178	791,932
Percentage	34.3%	34.8%	3.4%
Swing	▼0.2 pp	▲0.4 pp	▼0.2 pp
	Fourth party	Fifth party	Sixth party
Leader	Gaspar Llamazares	Xabier Arzalluz	Josep-Lluís Carod-Rovira
Party	IU	EAJ/PNV	ERC–AM
Leader since	29 October 2000	18 January 1985	25 November 1996
Last election	2,579 c., 7.6% (Note: Results for IU (6.5%, 2,295 c. and 39 p.) and IC–V–EPM (1.1%, 284 c. and 3 p.) in the 1999 elections.); 42 p.	1,206 c., 1.9% 56 p.	677 seats c., 1.1% 6 p.
Seats won	2,601 c. 50 p.	1,671 c. 73 p.	1,282 c. 13 p.
Seat change	▲22 c. ▲8 p.	▲465 c. ▲17 p.	▲605 c. ▲7 p.
Popular vote	1,730,732	514,850	419,961
Percentage	7.5%	2.2%	1.8%
Swing	▼0.1 pp	▲0.3 pp	▲0.7 pp
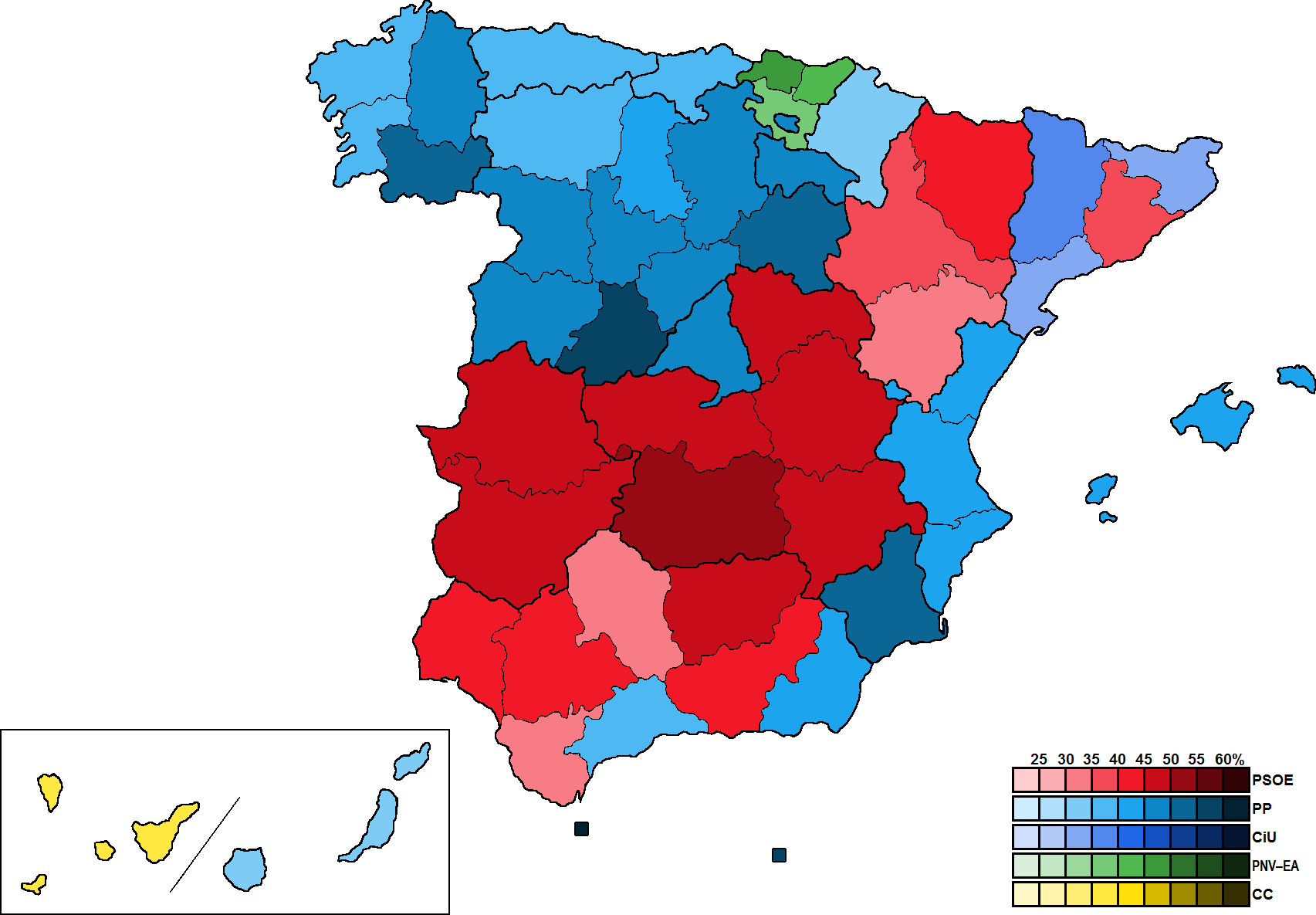
- Provincial results map for municipal elections

Local elections were held in Spain on 25 May 2003 to elect all 65,510 councillors in the 8,108 Spanish municipalities (including 50 seats in the assemblies of the autonomous cities of Ceuta and Melilla), all 1,187 provincial seats in 41 provinces (including 38 indirectly-elected provincial deputations and the three foral deputations in the Basque Country) and 208 seats in ten island councils (seven Canarian and three Balearic ones). They were held concurrently with regional elections in thirteen autonomous communities.

== Overview ==
=== Local government ===
Under the 1978 Constitution, the governance of municipalities in Spain was centered on the figure of city councils (Spanish: ayuntamientos), local corporations with independent legal personality composed of a mayor, a government council and an elected legislative assembly. The mayor was indirectly elected by the local assembly, requiring an absolute majority; otherwise, the candidate from the most-voted party automatically became mayor (ties were resolved by drawing lots). The concejo abierto system (English: open council), under which voters directly elected the local mayor by plurality voting, was reserved for municipalities under 100 inhabitants and some minor local entities.

Provincial deputations were the governing bodies of provinces in Spain—except for single-province autonomous communities—having an administration role of municipal activities and composed of a provincial president, an administrative body, and a plenary. For insular provinces, such as the Balearic and Canary Islands, deputations were replaced by island councils in each of the islands or group of islands. For Gran Canaria, Tenerife, Fuerteventura, La Gomera, El Hierro, Lanzarote and La Palma, this figure was referred to in Spanish as cabildo insular, whereas for Mallorca, Menorca and Ibiza–Formentera, its name was consejo insular (Catalan: consell insular). (Note: For the Balearic Islands, regional lawmakers served as island councillors.) The three Basque provinces had foral deputations instead (called General Assemblies, or Juntas Generales).

=== Date ===
The term of local assemblies in Spain expired four years after the date of their previous election, with election day being fixed for the fourth Sunday of May every four years. The election decree was required to be issued no later than 54 days before the scheduled election date and published on the following day in the Official State Gazette (BOE). The previous local elections were held on 13 June 1999, setting the date for election day on the fourth Sunday of May four years later, which was 25 May 2003.

Local assemblies could not be dissolved before the expiration of their term, except in cases of mismanagement that seriously harmed the public interest and implied a breach of constitutional obligations, in which case the Council of Ministers could—optionally—decide to call a by-election.

Elections to the assemblies of local entities were officially called on 1 April 2003 with the publication of the corresponding decree in the BOE, setting election day for 25 May. Subsequent by-elections were called on 2 September, for 26 October.

=== Electoral system ===
Voting for local assemblies and Canarian island councils was based on universal suffrage, comprising all Spanish nationals over 18 years of age, registered and residing in the municipality or council and with full political rights (provided that they had not been deprived of the right to vote by a final sentence, nor were legally incapacitated), as well as resident non-national European citizens, and those whose country of origin allowed reciprocal voting by virtue of a treaty.

Local councillors were elected using the D'Hondt method and closed-list proportional voting, with a five percent-threshold of valid votes (including blank ballots) in each constituency. Each municipality or council was a multi-member constituency, with a number of seats based on the following scale:

Population	Councillors		
Population	Municipalities	Canary Islands	Balearic Islands
<250	5	No island below 5,000 inhabitants	Fixed number: Ibiza–Formentera: 13; Menorca: 13; Mallorca: 33
251–1,000	7	No island below 5,000 inhabitants	Fixed number: Ibiza–Formentera: 13; Menorca: 13; Mallorca: 33
1,001–2,000	9	No island below 5,000 inhabitants	Fixed number: Ibiza–Formentera: 13; Menorca: 13; Mallorca: 33
2,001–5,000	11	No island below 5,000 inhabitants	Fixed number: Ibiza–Formentera: 13; Menorca: 13; Mallorca: 33
5,001–10,000	13	11	Fixed number: Ibiza–Formentera: 13; Menorca: 13; Mallorca: 33
10,001–20,000	17	13	Fixed number: Ibiza–Formentera: 13; Menorca: 13; Mallorca: 33
20,001–50,000	21	17	Fixed number: Ibiza–Formentera: 13; Menorca: 13; Mallorca: 33
50,001–100,000	25	21	Fixed number: Ibiza–Formentera: 13; Menorca: 13; Mallorca: 33
>100,001	+1 per each 100,000 inhabitants or fraction +1 if total is an even number		Fixed number: Ibiza–Formentera: 13; Menorca: 13; Mallorca: 33

Councillors in municipalities between 100 and 250 inhabitants were elected using open-list partial block voting, with voters choosing up to four candidates.

Most provincial deputations were indirectly elected by applying the D'Hondt method and a three percent-threshold of valid votes to municipal results—excluding candidacies not electing any councillor—in each judicial district. Seats were allocated to provincial deputations based on the following scale (with each judicial district being assigned an initial minimum of one seat and a maximum of three-fifths of the total number of provincial seats, with the remaining ones distributed in proportion to population):

Population	Seats
<500,000	25
500,001–1,000,000	27
1,000,001–3,500,000	31
>3,500,001	51

The General Assemblies of Álava, Biscay and Gipuzkoa were directly elected by voters under their own, specific electoral regulations.

The law did not provide for by-elections to fill vacant seats; instead, any vacancies arising after the proclamation of candidates and during the legislative term were filled by the next candidates on the party lists or, when required, by designated substitutes.

== Parties and candidates ==
The electoral law allowed for parties and federations registered in the interior ministry, alliances and groupings of electors to present lists of candidates. Parties and federations intending to form an alliance were required to inform the relevant electoral commission within 10 days of the election call, whereas groupings of electors needed to secure the signature of a determined amount of the electors registered in the municipality for which they sought election, disallowing electors from signing for more than one list:

- At least one percent of the electors in municipalities with a population below 5,000 inhabitants, provided that the number of signers was more than double that of councillors at stake.
- At least 100 signatures in municipalities with a population between 5,001 and 10,000.
- At least 500 signatures in municipalities with a population between 10,001 and 50,000.
- At least 1,500 signatures in municipalities with a population between 50,001 and 150,000.
- At least 3,000 signatures in municipalities with a population between 150,001 and 300,000.
- At least 5,000 signatures in municipalities with a population between 300,001 and 1,000,000.
- At least 8,000 signatures in municipalities with a population over 1,000,001.

== Results ==
=== Municipal ===
==== Overall ====
← Summary of the 25 May 2003 Spanish municipal election results →
Parties and alliances	Popular vote			Councillors	
Parties and alliances	Votes	%	±pp	Total	+/−
Spanish Socialist Workers' Party (PSOE)^{1}	7,999,178	34.83	+0.43	**23,224**	+1,240
People's Party (PP)	7,875,762	34.29	−0.17	**23,615**	−1,011
People's Party (PP)^{2}	7,775,800	33.86	−0.20	23,280	−1,019
Navarrese People's Union (UPN)	99,962	0.44	+0.01	335	+8
United Left (IU)	1,730,732	7.54	−0.05	**2,601**	+22
United Left (IU)^{3}	1,394,871	6.07	−0.18	2,204	−56
Initiative–Alternative Left–Agreement for Municipal Progress (ICV–EA–EPM)^{4}	335,861	1.46	+0.12	397	+78
Convergence and Union (CiU)	791,932	3.45	−0.18	**3,687**	−402
Basque Nationalist Party–Basque Solidarity (PNV–EA)	514,850	2.24	+0.31	**1,671**	+465
Republican Left of Catalonia–Municipal Agreement (ERC–AM)	419,961	1.83	+0.77	**1,282**	+605
Andalusian Party (PA)^{5}	342,824	1.49	−0.20	**693**	+144
Galician Nationalist Bloc (BNG)	325,331	1.42	+0.06	**595**	+9
Canarian Coalition (CC)	283,701	1.24	−0.03	**458**	+15
Canarian Coalition (CC)^{6}	281,527	1.23	−0.03	448	+14
Independent Herrenian Group (AHI)	2,174	0.01	±0.00	10	+1
Valencian Nationalist Bloc–Green Left (Bloc–EV)	139,307	0.61	+0.08	**298**	+64
The Greens (LV)	119,201	0.52	+0.21	**19**	+5
Aragonese Union (CHA)	88,939	0.39	+0.13	**196**	+116
Valencian Union (UV)	86,539	0.38	−0.13	**131**	−98
Aragonese Party (PAR)	85,857	0.37	−0.04	**907**	−18
Regionalist Party of Cantabria (PRC)	66,592	0.29	+0.06	**276**	+59
Socialist Party of Andalusia (PSA)	58,931	0.26	New	**57**	+57
Leonese People's Union (UPL)	45,791	0.20	+0.02	**230**	+63
Majorcan Union (UM)	36,485	0.16	+0.04	**103**	+35
Canarian Nationalist Federation (FNC)	36,205	0.16	+0.05	**45**	+5
Canarian Nationalist Party (PNC)	13,951	0.06	+0.01	11	+9
Lanzarote Independents Party (PIL)	11,721	0.05	+0.01	27	−2
Canarian Union (UC)	8,461	0.04	New	2	+2
Independents of Fuerteventura (IF)	2,072	0.01	±0.00	5	−4
PSM–Nationalist Agreement (PSM–EN)	35,633	0.16	−0.03	**98**	−14
Socialist Party of Mallorca–Nationalist Agreement (PSM–EN)	32,743	0.14	−0.04	92	−13
Socialist Party of Menorca–Nationalist Agreement (PSM–EN)	2,890	0.01	±0.00	6	−1
Aralar (Aralar)	31,235	0.14	New	**48**	+48
Liberal Independent Group (GIL)	26,363	0.11	−0.30	**20**	−73
Democratic and Social Centre (CDS)	23,428	0.10	−0.20	**54**	−227
Federation of Independents of Catalonia (FIC)	23,278	0.10	−0.01	**104**	−76
The Greens of the Community of Madrid (LVCM)	21,672	0.09	New	**2**	+2
Independent Group for Almería (GIAL)	18,961	0.08	New	**31**	+31
Progressive Pact+Coalition of Progressive Organizations (Pacte+COP)	16,595	0.07	−0.01	**39**	−6
Progressive Pact (Pacte)	15,262	0.07	±0.00	33	−4
Coalition of Progressive Organizations (COP)	1,333	0.01	±0.00	6	−2
Commoners' Land–Castilian Nationalist Party (TC–PNC)	16,411	0.07	−0.01	**42**	−3
Asturian Renewal Union (URAS)	15,621	0.07	−0.10	**29**	−54
Spanish Democratic Party (PADE)	14,926	0.06	−0.05	**34**	+2
Independent Candidacy–The Party of Castile and León (CI–PCL)	13,977	0.06	+0.02	**65**	+47
Meeting Point for Self-Determination (AuB)^{7} ^{8}	13,098	0.06	−1.22	**63**	−827
Riojan Party (PR)	12,667	0.06	+0.01	**65**	+7
Independent Democratic Centre (CDI)	11,381	0.05	New	**24**	+24
United Extremadura (EU)	10,489	0.05	+0.01	**55**	+5
Convergence of Democrats of Navarre (CDN)	10,440	0.05	−0.02	**17**	−8
Galician Progressive Democracy (DPG)	10,373	0.05	−0.03	**2**	−34
Independent Solution (SI)	9,274	0.04	New	**10**	+10
Initiative for the Development of Soria (IDES)	4,040	0.02	New	**21**	+21
25 May Citizens' Alternative (AC25M)	3,022	0.01	New	**5**	+5
Others (lists at <0.05% not securing any provincial or island seat)	1,172,067	5.10	—	**4,594**	+54
Blank ballots	404,448	1.76	−0.19		
**Total**	**22,967,517**	**100.00**		**65,510**	**+309**
Valid votes	22,967,517	98.70	−0.39		
Invalid votes	302,555	1.30	+0.39		
**Votes cast / turnout**	**23,270,072**	**67.67**	**+3.68**		
Abstentions	11,116,390	32.33	−3.68		
**Registered voters**	**34,386,462**				
Sources
Footnotes: ^{1} Spanish Socialist Workers' Party results are compared to the combined totals of the Spanish Socialist Workers' Party and Democratic Party of the New Left in the 1999 elections.; ^{2} People's Party results are compared to the combined totals of People's Party in Melilla and Melillan People's Union in the 1999 elections.; ^{3} United Left does not include results in Catalonia.; ^{4} Initiative–Alternative Left–Agreement for Municipal Progress results are compared to the combined totals of Initiative for Catalonia–Greens and United and Alternative Left in the 1999 elections.; ^{5} Andalusian Party results are compared to the combined totals of Andalusian Party and Pro-Torre del Mar Municipality Independent Group in the 1999 elections.; ^{6} Canarian Coalition results are compared to the combined totals of Canarian Coalition, Nationalist Canarian Centre and Independents of Gran Canaria in the 1999 elections.; ^{7} Meeting Point for Self-Determination results are compared to Basque Citizens totals in the 1999 elections.; ^{8} The Supreme Court annulled 229 of the 249 lists of Meeting Point for Self-Determination due to them being a continuation of the outlawed Unity and Basque Citizens parties. Consequently, these forces called for their voters to cast invalid ballots. Results for AuB refer only to the 16 lists which were not invalidated.

Popular vote
PSOE	34.83%
PP	34.29%
IU	7.54%
CiU	3.45%
PNV–EA	2.24%
ERC–AM	1.83%
PA	1.49%
BNG	1.42%
CC	1.24%
Bloc–EV	0.61%
LV	0.52%
Others	8.80%
Blank ballots	1.76%

==== City control ====
The following table lists party control in provincial capitals (highlighted in bold), as well as in municipalities above 75,000. Gains for a party are highlighted in that party's colour.

Municipality	Population	Previous control	New control
**A Coruña**	242,458	Spanish Socialist Workers' Party (PSOE)	Spanish Socialist Workers' Party (PSOE)
**Albacete**	152,155	Spanish Socialist Workers' Party (PSOE)	Spanish Socialist Workers' Party (PSOE)
Alcalá de Henares	179,602	Spanish Socialist Workers' Party (PSOE)	People's Party (PP)
Alcobendas	95,104	Spanish Socialist Workers' Party (PSOE)	Spanish Socialist Workers' Party (PSOE)
Alcorcón	149,594	People's Party (PP)	Spanish Socialist Workers' Party (PSOE)
Algeciras	106,710	Andalusian Party (PA)	Spanish Socialist Workers' Party (PSOE)
**Alicante**	293,629	People's Party (PP)	People's Party (PP)
**Almería**	173,338	Spanish Socialist Workers' Party (PSOE)	People's Party (PP)
**Ávila**	50,241	People's Party (PP)	People's Party (PP)
Avilés	83,511	Spanish Socialist Workers' Party (PSOE)	Spanish Socialist Workers' Party (PSOE)
**Badajoz**	136,851	People's Party (PP)	People's Party (PP)
Badalona	210,370	Socialists' Party of Catalonia (PSC–PSOE)	Socialists' Party of Catalonia (PSC–PSOE)
Barakaldo	95,515	Spanish Socialist Workers' Party (PSOE)	Spanish Socialist Workers' Party (PSOE)
**Barcelona**	1,527,190	Socialists' Party of Catalonia (PSC–PSOE)	Socialists' Party of Catalonia (PSC–PSOE)
**Bilbao**	353,950	Basque Nationalist Party–Basque Solidarity (PNV–EA)	Basque Nationalist Party–Basque Solidarity (PNV–EA)
**Burgos**	167,962	Spanish Socialist Workers' Party (PSOE)	People's Party (PP)
**Cáceres**	84,439	People's Party (PP)	People's Party (PP)
**Cádiz**	136,236	People's Party (PP)	People's Party (PP)
Cartagena	188,003	People's Party (PP)	People's Party (PP)
**Castellón de la Plana**	153,225	People's Party (PP)	People's Party (PP)
**Ciudad Real**	65,084	People's Party (PP)	People's Party (PP)
**Córdoba**	314,805	United Left (IU)	United Left (IU)
Cornellà de Llobregat	81,881	Socialists' Party of Catalonia (PSC–PSOE)	Socialists' Party of Catalonia (PSC–PSOE)
Coslada	79,862	Spanish Socialist Workers' Party (PSOE)	People's Party (PP)
**Cuenca**	46,859	Spanish Socialist Workers' Party (PSOE)	Spanish Socialist Workers' Party (PSOE)
**Donostia-San Sebastián**	181,700	Spanish Socialist Workers' Party (PSOE)	Spanish Socialist Workers' Party (PSOE)
Dos Hermanas	103,282	Spanish Socialist Workers' Party (PSOE)	Spanish Socialist Workers' Party (PSOE)
El Puerto de Santa María	77,747	Portuese Independents (IP)	Portuese Independents (IP)
Elche	201,731	Spanish Socialist Workers' Party (PSOE)	Spanish Socialist Workers' Party (PSOE)
Ferrol	79,520	Galician Nationalist Bloc (BNG)	People's Party (PP)
Fuenlabrada	179,735	Spanish Socialist Workers' Party (PSOE)	Spanish Socialist Workers' Party (PSOE)
Getafe	153,868	Spanish Socialist Workers' Party (PSOE)	Spanish Socialist Workers' Party (PSOE)
Getxo	84,024	Basque Nationalist Party–Basque Solidarity (PNV–EA)	Basque Nationalist Party–Basque Solidarity (PNV–EA)
Gijón	270,211	Spanish Socialist Workers' Party (PSOE)	Spanish Socialist Workers' Party (PSOE)
**Girona**	77,475	Socialists' Party of Catalonia (PSC–PSOE)	Socialists' Party of Catalonia (PSC–PSOE)
**Granada**	240,522	Spanish Socialist Workers' Party (PSOE)	People's Party (PP)
**Guadalajara**	69,098	People's Party (PP)	Spanish Socialist Workers' Party (PSOE)
**Huelva**	140,862	People's Party (PP)	People's Party (PP)
**Huesca**	46,462	Spanish Socialist Workers' Party (PSOE)	Spanish Socialist Workers' Party (PSOE)
**Jaén**	112,921	People's Party (PP)	People's Party (PP)
Jerez de la Frontera	187,087	Andalusian Party (PA)	People's Party (PP) (PSOE in 2005)
L'Hospitalet de Llobregat	244,323	Socialists' Party of Catalonia (PSC–PSOE)	Socialists' Party of Catalonia (PSC–PSOE)
**Las Palmas de Gran Canaria**	370,649	People's Party (PP)	People's Party (PP)
Leganés	174,436	Spanish Socialist Workers' Party (PSOE)	Spanish Socialist Workers' Party (PSOE)
**León**	135,794	People's Party (PP)	Spanish Socialist Workers' Party (PSOE) (PP in 2004)
**Lleida**	115,000	Socialists' Party of Catalonia (PSC–PSOE)	Socialists' Party of Catalonia (PSC–PSOE)
**Logroño**	136,841	People's Party (PP)	People's Party (PP)
**Lorca**	79,481	Spanish Socialist Workers' Party (PSOE)	Spanish Socialist Workers' Party (PSOE)
**Lugo**	89,509	Spanish Socialist Workers' Party (PSOE)	Spanish Socialist Workers' Party (PSOE)
**Madrid**	3,016,788	People's Party (PP)	People's Party (PP)
**Málaga**	535,686	People's Party (PP)	People's Party (PP)
Marbella	115,871	Liberal Independent Group (GIL)	Liberal Independent Group (GIL) (PSOE in 2006)
Mataró	109,298	Socialists' Party of Catalonia (PSC–PSOE)	Socialists' Party of Catalonia (PSC–PSOE)
Móstoles	198,819	Spanish Socialist Workers' Party (PSOE)	People's Party (PP)
**Murcia**	377,888	People's Party (PP)	People's Party (PP)
**Ourense**	109,011	People's Party (PP)	People's Party (PP)
**Oviedo**	202,938	People's Party (PP)	People's Party (PP)
**Palencia**	80,801	Spanish Socialist Workers' Party (PSOE)	Spanish Socialist Workers' Party (PSOE)
**Palma de Mallorca**	358,462	People's Party (PP)	People's Party (PP)
**Pamplona**	189,364	Navarrese People's Union (UPN)	Navarrese People's Union (UPN)
Parla	80,545	Spanish Socialist Workers' Party (PSOE)	Spanish Socialist Workers' Party (PSOE)
**Pontevedra**	76,798	Galician Nationalist Bloc (BNG)	Galician Nationalist Bloc (BNG)
Reus	91,616	Socialists' Party of Catalonia (PSC–PSOE)	Socialists' Party of Catalonia (PSC–PSOE)
Sabadell	187,201	Socialists' Party of Catalonia (PSC–PSOE)	Socialists' Party of Catalonia (PSC–PSOE)
**Salamanca**	156,006	People's Party (PP)	People's Party (PP)
San Cristóbal de La Laguna	135,004	Canarian Coalition (CC)	Canarian Coalition (CC)
San Fernando	88,333	Andalusian Party (PA)	Andalusian Party (PA)
Sant Boi de Llobregat	80,041	Socialists' Party of Catalonia (PSC–PSOE)	Socialists' Party of Catalonia (PSC–PSOE)
Santa Coloma de Gramenet	115,568	Socialists' Party of Catalonia (PSC–PSOE)	Socialists' Party of Catalonia (PSC–PSOE)
**Santa Cruz de Tenerife**	217,415	Canarian Coalition (CC)	Canarian Coalition (CC)
**Santander**	184,661	People's Party (PP)	People's Party (PP)
Santiago de Compostela	93,273	Spanish Socialist Workers' Party (PSOE)	Spanish Socialist Workers' Party (PSOE)
**Segovia**	54,945	Democratic and Social Centre (CDS)	Spanish Socialist Workers' Party (PSOE)
**Seville**	704,114	Spanish Socialist Workers' Party (PSOE)	Spanish Socialist Workers' Party (PSOE)
**Soria**	35,112	Spanish Socialist Workers' Party (PSOE)	People's Party (PP)
Talavera de la Reina	77,519	Spanish Socialist Workers' Party (PSOE)	Spanish Socialist Workers' Party (PSOE)
**Tarragona**	117,184	Convergence and Union (CiU)	Convergence and Union (CiU)
Telde	91,160	Canarian Coalition (CC)	People's Party (PP)
Terrassa	179,300	Socialists' Party of Catalonia (PSC–PSOE)	Socialists' Party of Catalonia (PSC–PSOE)
**Teruel**	31,506	People's Party (PP)	Spanish Socialist Workers' Party (PSOE)
**Toledo**	70,893	People's Party (PP)	People's Party (PP)
Torrejón de Ardoz	101,056	Spanish Socialist Workers' Party (PSOE)	Spanish Socialist Workers' Party (PSOE)
**Valencia**	761,871	People's Party (PP)	People's Party (PP)
**Valladolid**	318,576	People's Party (PP)	People's Party (PP)
Vigo	288,324	Galician Nationalist Bloc (BNG)	Spanish Socialist Workers' Party (PSOE) (PP in 2003)
**Vitoria-Gasteiz**	221,270	People's Party (PP)	People's Party (PP)
**Zamora**	65,575	People's Party (PP)	People's Party (PP)
**Zaragoza**	620,419	People's Party (PP)	Spanish Socialist Workers' Party (PSOE)

==== Autonomous cities ====
The following table lists party control in the autonomous cities. Gains for a party are highlighted in that party's colour.

City	Population	Previous control	New control
Ceuta	76,152	People's Party (PP)	People's Party (PP)
Melilla	69,184	People's Party (PP)	People's Party (PP)

=== Provincial and island ===
==== Summary ====
← Summary of the 25 May 2003 Spanish provincial and island election results →
Parties and alliances	Seats				
Parties and alliances	PD	IC	FD	Total	+/−
Spanish Socialist Workers' Party (PSOE)	459	61	35	**555**	+46
People's Party (PP)	429	64	34	**527**	−20
Basque Nationalist Party–Basque Solidarity (PNV–EA)	—	—	73	**73**	+17
Canarian Coalition (CC)	—	56	—	**56**	±0
Canarian Coalition (CC)	—	49	—	49	±0
Independent Herrenian Group (AHI)	—	7	—	7	±0
United Left (IU)	39	2	9	**50**	+8
United Left (IU)^{1}	30	2	9	41	+2
Initiative–Alternative Left–Agreement for Municipal Progress (ICV–EA–EPM)	9	—	—	9	+6
Convergence and Union (CiU)	50	—	—	**50**	−7
Galician Nationalist Bloc (BNG)	15	—	—	**15**	±0
Republican Left of Catalonia–Municipal Agreement (ERC–AM)	13	—	—	**13**	+7
Canarian Nationalist Federation (FNC)	—	11	—	**11**	+1
Lanzarote Independents Party (PIL)	—	8	—	8	+1
Independents of Fuerteventura (IF)	—	2	—	2	−1
Canarian Nationalist Party (PNC)	—	1	—	1	+1
Aragonese Party (PAR)	9	—	—	**9**	−1
Andalusian Party (PA)	7	—	—	**7**	−5
Progressive Pact+Coalition of Progressive Organizations (Pacte+COP)	—	5	—	**5**	−2
Progressive Pact (Pacte)^{6}	—	5	—	5	−1
Coalition of Progressive Organizations (COP)	—	0	—	0	−1
Aragonese Union (CHA)	4	—	—	**4**	+1
PSM–Nationalist Agreement (PSM–EN)	—	4	—	**4**	−1
Socialist Party of Mallorca–Nationalist Agreement (PSM–EN)	—	3	—	3	−1
Socialist Party of Menorca–Nationalist Agreement (PSM–EN)	—	1	—	1	±0
Majorcan Union (UM)	—	3	—	**3**	±0
Socialist Party of Andalusia (PSA)	2	—	—	**2**	+2
Leonese People's Union (UPL)	2	—	—	**2**	−1
Valencian Nationalist Bloc–Green Left (Bloc–EV)	1	—	—	**1**	−1
Valencian Union (UV)	1	—	—	**1**	±0
Aralar (Aralar)	—	—	1	**1**	+1
Liberal Independent Group (GIL)	1	—	—	**1**	−4
Independent Group for Almería (GIAL)	1	—	—	**1**	+1
Independent Solution (SI)	1	—	—	**1**	+1
Alavese Unity (UA)	—	—	1	**1**	−1
Initiative for the Development of Soria (IDES)	1	—	—	**1**	+1
25 May Citizens' Alternative (AC25M)	—	1	—	**1**	+1
Independent Popular Council of Formentera (AIPF)	—	1	—	**1**	+1
Centrist Union–Democratic and Social Centre (UC–CDS)	0	—	—	0	−1
Commoners' Land–Castilian Nationalist Party (TC–PNC)	0	—	—	0	−1
Independent Sorian Alternative (ALSI)	0	—	—	0	−1
Independent Burgalese Popular Action (APBI)	0	—	—	0	−1
Basque Citizens (EH)	n/a	n/a	n/a	0	−29
Independents (INDEP)	1	0	0	**1**	±0
**Total**	**1,036**	**208**	**153**	**1,397**	**+12**
Sources
Footnotes: ^{1} United Left does not include results in Catalonia.

==== Indirectly-elected ====
The following table lists party control in the indirectly-elected provincial deputations. Gains for a party are highlighted in that party's colour.

Province	Population	Previous control	New control
A Coruña	1,111,886	People's Party (PP)	Spanish Socialist Workers' Party (PSOE)
Albacete	371,787	Spanish Socialist Workers' Party (PSOE)	Spanish Socialist Workers' Party (PSOE)
Alicante	1,557,968	People's Party (PP)	People's Party (PP)
Almería	546,498	People's Party (PP)	People's Party (PP)
Ávila	165,138	People's Party (PP)	People's Party (PP)
Badajoz	662,808	Spanish Socialist Workers' Party (PSOE)	Spanish Socialist Workers' Party (PSOE)
Barcelona	4,906,117	Socialists' Party of Catalonia (PSC–PSOE)	Socialists' Party of Catalonia (PSC–PSOE)
Burgos	352,230	People's Party (PP)	People's Party (PP)
Cáceres	410,242	Spanish Socialist Workers' Party (PSOE)	Spanish Socialist Workers' Party (PSOE)
Cádiz	1,140,793	Spanish Socialist Workers' Party (PSOE)	Spanish Socialist Workers' Party (PSOE)
Castellón	501,237	People's Party (PP)	People's Party (PP)
Ciudad Real	484,338	Spanish Socialist Workers' Party (PSOE)	Spanish Socialist Workers' Party (PSOE)
Córdoba	771,131	Spanish Socialist Workers' Party (PSOE)	Spanish Socialist Workers' Party (PSOE)
Cuenca	201,614	Spanish Socialist Workers' Party (PSOE)	Spanish Socialist Workers' Party (PSOE)
Girona	598,112	Convergence and Union (CiU)	Convergence and Union (CiU)
Granada	818,959	Spanish Socialist Workers' Party (PSOE)	Spanish Socialist Workers' Party (PSOE)
Guadalajara	177,761	Spanish Socialist Workers' Party (PSOE)	Spanish Socialist Workers' Party (PSOE)
Huelva	464,934	Spanish Socialist Workers' Party (PSOE)	Spanish Socialist Workers' Party (PSOE)
Huesca	208,963	Spanish Socialist Workers' Party (PSOE)	Spanish Socialist Workers' Party (PSOE)
Jaén	647,387	Spanish Socialist Workers' Party (PSOE)	Spanish Socialist Workers' Party (PSOE)
León	496,655	People's Party (PP)	People's Party (PP)
Lleida	371,055	Convergence and Union (CiU)	Convergence and Union (CiU)
Lugo	361,782	People's Party (PP)	People's Party (PP)
Málaga	1,330,010	Spanish Socialist Workers' Party (PSOE)	Spanish Socialist Workers' Party (PSOE)
Ourense	343,768	People's Party (PP)	People's Party (PP)
Palencia	176,125	People's Party (PP)	People's Party (PP)
Pontevedra	919,934	People's Party (PP)	People's Party (PP)
Salamanca	347,120	People's Party (PP)	People's Party (PP)
Segovia	148,890	People's Party (PP)	People's Party (PP)
Seville	1,758,720	Spanish Socialist Workers' Party (PSOE)	Spanish Socialist Workers' Party (PSOE)
Soria	91,370	People's Party (PP)	People's Party (PP)
Tarragona	631,156	Convergence and Union (CiU)	Convergence and Union (CiU)
Teruel	137,342	Aragonese Party (PAR)	Aragonese Party (PAR) (PSOE in 2006)
Toledo	546,538	People's Party (PP)	Spanish Socialist Workers' Party (PSOE)
Valencia	2,267,503	People's Party (PP)	People's Party (PP)
Valladolid	501,157	People's Party (PP)	People's Party (PP)
Zamora	200,678	People's Party (PP)	People's Party (PP)
Zaragoza	871,209	Spanish Socialist Workers' Party (PSOE)	Spanish Socialist Workers' Party (PSOE)

==== Island councils ====
The following table lists party control in the island councils. Gains for a party are highlighted in that party's colour.

Island	Population	Previous control	New control
El Hierro	10,002	Independent Herrenian Group (AHI)	Independent Herrenian Group (AHI)
Fuerteventura	69,762	Canarian Coalition (CC)	Canarian Coalition (CC)
Gran Canaria	771,333	People's Party (PP)	People's Party (PP)
Ibiza–Formentera	107,394	Progressive Pact (Pacte)	People's Party (PP)
La Gomera	19,098	Spanish Socialist Workers' Party (PSOE)	Spanish Socialist Workers' Party (PSOE)
La Palma	85,547	Canarian Coalition (CC)	Canarian Coalition (CC)
Lanzarote	109,942	Spanish Socialist Workers' Party (PSOE)	Lanzarote Independents Party (PIL) (PP in 2005; CC in 2005)
Mallorca	730,778	Majorcan Union (UM)	Majorcan Union (UM)
Menorca	78,796	Spanish Socialist Workers' Party (PSOE)	Spanish Socialist Workers' Party (PSOE)
Tenerife	778,071	Canarian Coalition (CC)	Canarian Coalition (CC)

==== Foral deputations ====
The following table lists party control in the foral deputations. Gains for a party are highlighted in that party's colour.

Province	Population	Previous control	New control
Álava	291,860	People's Party (PP)	People's Party (PP)
Biscay	1,133,444	Basque Nationalist Party (EAJ/PNV)	Basque Nationalist Party (EAJ/PNV)
Guipúzcoa	682,977	Basque Nationalist Party (EAJ/PNV)	Basque Nationalist Party (EAJ/PNV)

== Bibliography ==
- Constitución Española (Constitution). Official State Gazette (in Spanish). 27 December 1978 [version as of 28 August 1992]. BOE-A-1978-31229.
- Ley Orgánica 10/1982, de 10 de agosto, de Estatuto de Autonomía de Canarias (Organic Law 10/1982). Official State Gazette (in Spanish). 10 August 1982 [version as of 2 July 2002]. BOE-A-1982-20821.
- Ley Orgánica 2/1983, de 25 de febrero, de Estatuto de Autonomía para las islas Baleares (Organic Law 2/1983). Official State Gazette (in Spanish). 1 March 1983. BOE-A-1983-6316.
- Ley 27/1983, de 25 de noviembre, de Relaciones entre las Instituciones Comunes de la Comunidad Autónoma y los Órganos Forales de sus Territorios Históricos (Law 27/1983). Official State Gazette (in Spanish). 25 November 1983 [version as of 20 July 1993]. BOE-A-2012-5193.
- Ley 7/1985, de 2 de abril, Reguladora de las Bases del Régimen Local (Law 7/1985). Official State Gazette (in Spanish). 2 April 1985 [version as of 11 March 2003]. BOE-A-1985-5392.
- Ley Orgánica 5/1985, de 19 de junio, del Régimen Electoral General (Organic Law 5/1985). Official State Gazette (in Spanish). 19 June 1985 [version as of 11 March 2003]. BOE-A-1985-11672.
- Ley 8/1986, de 26 de noviembre, Electoral de la Comunidad Autónoma de las Islas Baleares (Law 8/1986). Official State Gazette (in Spanish). 26 November 1986 [version as of 28 March 2003]. BOE-A-1987-2903.
- Ley 1/1987, de 27 de marzo, de Elecciones para las Juntas Generales de los Territorios Históricos de Araba, Bizkaia y Gipuzkoa (Law 1/1987). Official State Gazette (in Spanish). 27 March 1987 [version as of 10 April 1987]. BOE-A-2012-3948.
- Ley 14/1990, de 26 de julio, de Régimen Jurídico de las Administraciones Públicas de Canarias (Law 14/1990). Official State Gazette (in Spanish). 26 July 1990 [version as of 14 December 2001]. BOE-A-1990-23140.
- Ley Orgánica 3/1999, de 8 de enero, de reforma de la Ley Orgánica 2/1983, de Estatuto de Autonomía de las Illes Balears (Organic Law 3/1999). Official State Gazette (in Spanish). 8 January 1999. BOE-A-1999-458.
- Ley 8/2000, de 27 de octubre, de Consejos Insulares (Law 8/2000). Official State Gazette (in Spanish). 27 October 2000 [version as of 1 June 2001]. BOE-A-2000-20977.
- Real Decreto 374/2003, de 31 de marzo, por el que se convocan elecciones locales y a las Asambleas de Ceuta y Melilla (Royal Decree 374/2003). Official State Gazette (in Spanish). 31 March 2003. BOE-A-2003-6489.
- Real Decreto 1086/2003, de 1 de septiembre, por el que se convocan elecciones locales parciales (Royal Decree 1086/2003). Official State Gazette (in Spanish). 1 September 2003. BOE-A-2003-16974.
