= 2015 Spanish local elections in Castilla–La Mancha =

This article presents the results breakdown of the local elections held in Castilla–La Mancha on 24 May 2015. The following tables show detailed results in the autonomous community's most populous municipalities, sorted alphabetically.

== City control ==
The following table lists party control in the most populous municipalities, including provincial capitals (shown in bold). Gains for a party are displayed with the cell's background shaded in that party's colour.

Municipality	Population	Previous control	New control
**Albacete**	172,487	People's Party (PP)	People's Party (PP)
**Ciudad Real**	74,960	People's Party (PP)	Spanish Socialist Workers' Party (PSOE)
**Cuenca**	55,738	Spanish Socialist Workers' Party (PSOE)	People's Party (PP)
**Guadalajara**	83,720	People's Party (PP)	People's Party (PP)
Talavera de la Reina	86,779	People's Party (PP)	People's Party (PP)
**Toledo**	83,334	Spanish Socialist Workers' Party (PSOE)	Spanish Socialist Workers' Party (PSOE)

== Municipalities ==
=== Albacete ===
Population: 172,487

← Summary of the 24 May 2015 City Council of Albacete election results →
Parties and alliances	Popular vote			Seats	
Parties and alliances	Votes	%	±pp	Total	+/−
People's Party (PP)	29,351	33.48	−18.65	**10**	−6
Spanish Socialist Workers' Party (PSOE)	23,944	27.31	−5.91	**8**	−2
Let's Win Albacete (Ganemos)^{1}	13,446	15.34	+9.09	**5**	+4
Citizens–Party of the Citizenry (C's)	11,902	13.58	New	**4**	+4
Participatory Democracy (Participa)	2,461	2.81	New	0	±0
Union, Progress and Democracy (UPyD)	1,532	1.75	−1.95	0	±0
Union of Independent Citizens (UCIN)	987	1.13	New	0	±0
Communist Party of the Peoples of Spain (PCPE)	717	0.82	New	0	±0
Initiative for Albacete (IxAb)	704	0.80	New	0	±0
Vox (Vox)	574	0.65	New	0	±0
Humanist Party (PH)	400	0.46	New	0	±0
Blank ballots	1,654	1.89	−0.66		
**Total**	**87,672**			**27**	**±0**
Valid votes	87,672	98.55	−0.05		
Invalid votes	1,287	1.45	+0.05		
**Votes cast / turnout**	**88,959**	**67.33**	**−2.70**		
Abstentions	43,161	32.67	+2.70		
**Registered voters**	**132,120**				
Sources
Footnotes: ^{1} Let's Win Albacete results are compared to United Left of Castilla–La Mancha totals in the 2011 election.

=== Ciudad Real ===
Population: 74,960

← Summary of the 24 May 2015 City Council of Ciudad Real election results →
Parties and alliances	Popular vote			Seats	
Parties and alliances	Votes	%	±pp	Total	+/−
People's Party (PP)	14,021	36.80	−14.76	**10**	−5
Spanish Socialist Workers' Party (PSOE)	11,888	31.21	−0.48	**9**	±0
Let's Win Ciudad Real (Ganemos)^{1}	5,977	15.69	+9.81	**4**	+3
Citizens–Party of the Citizenry (C's)	2,853	7.49	New	**2**	+2
Union, Progress and Democracy (UPyD)	1,280	3.36	−1.49	0	±0
Vox (Vox)	791	2.08	New	0	±0
Castilian Unity–Pact (UdCa–Pacto)	224	0.59	−1.14	0	±0
Blank ballots	1,062	2.79	+0.07		
**Total**	**38,096**			**25**	**±0**
Valid votes	38,096	98.02	−0.62		
Invalid votes	769	1.98	+0.62		
**Votes cast / turnout**	**38,865**	**66.71**	**−3.19**		
Abstentions	19,397	33.29	+3.19		
**Registered voters**	**58,262**				
Sources
Footnotes: ^{1} Let's Win Ciudad Real results are compared to United Left of Castilla–La Mancha totals in the 2011 election.

=== Cuenca ===
Population: 55,738

← Summary of the 24 May 2015 City Council of Cuenca election results →
Parties and alliances	Popular vote			Seats	
Parties and alliances	Votes	%	±pp	Total	+/−
People's Party (PP)	10,406	37.32	−6.00	**10**	−2
Spanish Socialist Workers' Party (PSOE)	9,084	32.58	−11.21	**9**	−4
United Left of Castilla–La Mancha (IUCLM)	3,570	12.80	+8.28	**3**	+3
Citizens–Party of the Citizenry (C's)	2,881	10.33	New	**3**	+3
Union, Progress and Democracy (UPyD)	597	2.14	−0.73	0	±0
Vox (Vox)	381	1.37	New	0	±0
Castilian Party–Commoners' Land–Pact (PCAS–TC–Pacto)	276	0.99	+0.29	0	±0
Blank ballots	688	2.47	−0.08		
**Total**	**27,883**			**25**	**±0**
Valid votes	27,883	97.85	−0.63		
Invalid votes	612	2.15	+0.63		
**Votes cast / turnout**	**28,495**	**68.15**	**−4.20**		
Abstentions	13,316	31.85	+4.20		
**Registered voters**	**41,811**				

=== Guadalajara ===
Population: 83,720

← Summary of the 24 May 2015 City Council of Guadalajara election results →
Parties and alliances	Popular vote			Seats	
Parties and alliances	Votes	%	±pp	Total	+/−
People's Party (PP)	15,307	37.22	−16.97	**11**	−5
Spanish Socialist Workers' Party (PSOE)	11,635	28.29	−2.12	**8**	±0
Guadalajara Now (Ahora Guadalajara)^{1}	6,913	16.81	+10.71	**4**	+3
Citizens–Party of the Citizenry (C's)	3,939	9.58	New	**2**	+2
Let's Win–Workers' Party of Spain–Hartos.org (Ganemos–PTE–Hartos.org)	942	2.29	New	0	±0
Union, Progress and Democracy (UPyD)	856	2.08	−1.37	0	±0
Vox (Vox)	614	1.49	New	0	±0
Castilian Party–Commoners' Land–Pact (PCAS–TC–Pacto)	175	0.43	−0.21	0	±0
Blank ballots	743	1.81	−0.54		
**Total**	**41,124**			**25**	**±0**
Valid votes	41,124	98.27	−0.12		
Invalid votes	724	1.73	+0.12		
**Votes cast / turnout**	**41,848**	**69.31**	**−3.04**		
Abstentions	18,529	30.69	+3.04		
**Registered voters**	**60,377**				
Sources
Footnotes: ^{1} Guadalajara Now results are compared to United Left of Castilla–La Mancha totals in the 2011 election.

=== Talavera de la Reina ===
Population: 86,779

← Summary of the 24 May 2015 City Council of Talavera de la Reina election results →
Parties and alliances	Popular vote			Seats	
Parties and alliances	Votes	%	±pp	Total	+/−
People's Party (PP)	15,859	39.48	−12.54	**11**	−3
Spanish Socialist Workers' Party (PSOE)	12,822	31.92	−4.96	**8**	−2
Let's Win Talavera (Ganemos)^{1}	5,862	14.59	+8.58	**4**	+3
Citizens–Party of the Citizenry (C's)	3,489	8.69	New	**2**	+2
Animalist Party Against Mistreatment of Animals (PACMA)	978	2.43	New	0	±0
Union, Progress and Democracy (UPyD)	527	1.31	−1.59	0	±0
Blank ballots	633	1.58	−0.61		
**Total**	**40,170**			**25**	**±0**
Valid votes	40,170	98.21	−0.50		
Invalid votes	734	1.79	+0.50		
**Votes cast / turnout**	**40,904**	**64.54**	**−4.70**		
Abstentions	22,469	35.46	+4.70		
**Registered voters**	**63,373**				
Sources
Footnotes: ^{1} Let's Win Talavera results are compared to United Left of Castilla–La Mancha totals in the 2011 election.

=== Toledo ===
Population: 83,334

← Summary of the 24 May 2015 City Council of Toledo election results →
Parties and alliances	Popular vote			Seats	
Parties and alliances	Votes	%	±pp	Total	+/−
People's Party (PP)	14,579	32.93	−9.47	**9**	−2
Spanish Socialist Workers' Party (PSOE)	13,358	30.17	−13.61	**9**	−3
Let's Win Toledo (Ganemos)^{1}	7,395	16.70	+8.79	**4**	+2
Citizens–Party of the Citizenry (C's)	4,486	10.13	New	**3**	+3
Union of Independent Citizens (UCIN)^{2}	1,141	2.58	+1.85	0	±0
Vox (Vox)	782	1.77	New	0	±0
Animalist Party Against Mistreatment of Animals (PACMA)	646	1.46	New	0	±0
Union, Progress and Democracy (UPyD)	535	1.21	−1.20	0	±0
Spain 2000 (E–2000)	393	0.89	New	0	±0
Blank Seats (EB)	160	0.36	New	0	±0
Spain on the Move (LEM)	52	0.12	New	0	±0
Blank ballots	744	1.68	+0.11		
**Total**	**44,271**			**25**	**±0**
Valid votes	44,271	98.46	−0.44		
Invalid votes	693	1.54	+0.44		
**Votes cast / turnout**	**44,964**	**71.94**	**−3.23**		
Abstentions	17,539	28.06	+3.23		
**Registered voters**	**62,503**				
Sources
Footnotes: ^{1} Let's Win Toledo results are compared to United Left of Castilla–La Mancha totals in the 2011 election.; ^{2} Union of Independent Citizens results are compared to Union of Independent Citizens of Toledo totals in the 2011 election.

== See also ==
- 2015 Castilian-Manchegan regional election
