= 2011 Spanish local elections in Castilla–La Mancha =

This article presents the results breakdown of the local elections held in Castilla–La Mancha on 22 May 2011. The following tables show detailed results in the autonomous community's most populous municipalities, sorted alphabetically.

== City control ==
The following table lists party control in the most populous municipalities, including provincial capitals (shown in bold). Gains for a party are displayed with the cell's background shaded in that party's colour.

Municipality	Population	Previous control	New control
**Albacete**	170,475	Spanish Socialist Workers' Party (PSOE)	People's Party (PP)
**Ciudad Real**	74,345	People's Party (PP)	People's Party (PP)
**Cuenca**	56,189	People's Party (PP)	Spanish Socialist Workers' Party (PSOE)
**Guadalajara**	83,789	People's Party (PP)	People's Party (PP)
Talavera de la Reina	88,986	Spanish Socialist Workers' Party (PSOE)	People's Party (PP)
**Toledo**	82,489	Spanish Socialist Workers' Party (PSOE)	Spanish Socialist Workers' Party (PSOE)

== Municipalities ==
=== Albacete ===
Population: 170,475

← Summary of the 22 May 2011 City Council of Albacete election results →
Parties and alliances	Popular vote			Seats	
Parties and alliances	Votes	%	±pp	Total	+/−
People's Party (PP)	46,383	52.13	+8.67	**16**	+3
Spanish Socialist Workers' Party (PSOE)	29,556	33.22	−13.04	**10**	−3
United Left of Castilla–La Mancha (IUCLM)	5,561	6.25	−0.28	**1**	±0
Union, Progress and Democracy (UPyD)	3,291	3.70	New	0	±0
For a Fairer World (PUM+J)	970	1.09	New	0	±0
Manchegan Regionalist Party (PRM)	948	1.07	−0.10	0	±0
Blank ballots	2,269	2.55	+0.32		
**Total**	**88,978**			**27**	**±0**
Valid votes	88,978	98.60	−0.74		
Invalid votes	1,260	1.40	+0.74		
**Votes cast / turnout**	**90,238**	**70.03**	**+8.57**		
Abstentions	38,626	29.97	−8.57		
**Registered voters**	**128,864**				

=== Ciudad Real ===
Population: 74,345

← Summary of the 22 May 2011 City Council of Ciudad Real election results →
Parties and alliances	Popular vote			Seats	
Parties and alliances	Votes	%	±pp	Total	+/−
People's Party (PP)	20,207	51.56	+1.24	**15**	±0
Spanish Socialist Workers' Party (PSOE)	12,419	31.69	−5.02	**9**	−1
United Left of Castilla–La Mancha (IUCLM)	2,306	5.88	+1.58	**1**	+1
Union, Progress and Democracy (UPyD)	1,902	4.85	New	0	±0
Castilian Unity (UdCa)	679	1.73	−0.05	0	±0
Citizens for Blank Votes (CenB)	615	1.57	New	0	±0
Blank ballots	1,065	2.72	+0.10		
**Total**	**39,193**			**25**	**±0**
Valid votes	39,193	98.64	−0.63		
Invalid votes	540	1.36	+0.63		
**Votes cast / turnout**	**39,733**	**69.90**	**+4.37**		
Abstentions	17,110	30.10	−4.37		
**Registered voters**	**56,843**				

=== Cuenca ===
Population: 56,189

← Summary of the 22 May 2011 City Council of Cuenca election results →
Parties and alliances	Popular vote			Seats	
Parties and alliances	Votes	%	±pp	Total	+/−
Spanish Socialist Workers' Party (PSOE)	12,828	43.79	+3.50	**13**	+2
People's Party (PP)	12,690	43.32	−3.65	**12**	−1
United Left of Castilla–La Mancha (IUCLM)	1,323	4.52	−0.49	0	−1
Union, Progress and Democracy (UPyD)	842	2.87	New	0	±0
The Greens–Green Group (LV–GV)	338	1.15	New	0	±0
Citizen Union for Democracy (UCiD)	319	1.09	New	0	±0
Castilian Party (PCAS)^{1}	206	0.70	+0.40	0	±0
Blank ballots	747	2.55	+0.44		
**Total**	**29,293**			**25**	**±0**
Valid votes	29,293	98.48	−0.78		
Invalid votes	451	1.52	+0.78		
**Votes cast / turnout**	**29,744**	**72.35**	**+6.77**		
Abstentions	11,365	27.65	−6.77		
**Registered voters**	**41,109**				
Sources
Footnotes: ^{1} Castilian Party results are compared to Commoners' Land totals in the 2007 election.

=== Guadalajara ===
Population: 83,789

← Summary of the 22 May 2011 City Council of Guadalajara election results →
Parties and alliances	Popular vote			Seats	
Parties and alliances	Votes	%	±pp	Total	+/−
People's Party (PP)	22,783	54.19	+4.53	**16**	+3
Spanish Socialist Workers' Party (PSOE)	12,783	30.41	−8.74	**8**	−3
United Left of Castilla–La Mancha (IUCLM)	2,566	6.10	+0.05	**1**	±0
Union, Progress and Democracy (UPyD)	1,449	3.45	New	0	±0
More Than One Citizen Platform of Guadalajara (+ de 1 Ciudadano)	1,153	2.74	New	0	±0
Castilian Party (PCAS)^{1}	267	0.64	+0.25	0	±0
Regeneration (REG)	51	0.12	New	0	±0
Blank ballots	987	2.35	−0.20		
**Total**	**42,039**			**25**	**±0**
Valid votes	42,039	98.39	−0.63		
Invalid votes	688	1.61	+0.63		
**Votes cast / turnout**	**42,727**	**72.35**	**+5.28**		
Abstentions	16,331	27.65	−5.28		
**Registered voters**	**59,058**				
Sources
Footnotes: ^{1} Castilian Party results are compared to Commoners' Land totals in the 2007 election.

=== Talavera de la Reina ===
Population: 88,986

← Summary of the 22 May 2011 City Council of Talavera de la Reina election results →
Parties and alliances	Popular vote			Seats	
Parties and alliances	Votes	%	±pp	Total	+/−
People's Party (PP)	22,419	52.02	+9.37	**14**	+3
Spanish Socialist Workers' Party (PSOE)	15,894	36.88	−13.28	**10**	−4
United Left of Castilla–La Mancha (IUCLM)	2,589	6.01	+1.86	**1**	+1
Union, Progress and Democracy (UPyD)	1,249	2.90	New	0	±0
Blank ballots	945	2.19	+0.67		
**Total**	**43,096**			**25**	**±0**
Valid votes	43,096	98.71	−0.53		
Invalid votes	562	1.29	+0.53		
**Votes cast / turnout**	**43,658**	**69.24**	**+6.55**		
Abstentions	19,391	30.76	−6.55		
**Registered voters**	**63,049**				

=== Toledo ===
Population: 82,489

← Summary of the 22 May 2011 City Council of Toledo election results →
Parties and alliances	Popular vote			Seats	
Parties and alliances	Votes	%	±pp	Total	+/−
Spanish Socialist Workers' Party (PSOE)	20,025	43.78	+0.33	**12**	+1
People's Party (PP)	19,395	42.40	−2.95	**11**	−1
United Left of Castilla–La Mancha (IUCLM)	3,616	7.91	−0.10	**2**	±0
Union, Progress and Democracy (UPyD)	1,101	2.41	New	0	±0
Union of Independent Citizens of Toledo (UCIT)	333	0.73	New	0	±0
Citizens for Blank Votes (CenB)	261	0.57	New	0	±0
Spanish Alternative (AES)	175	0.38	New	0	±0
Independent Regional Unity–Castilian Party (PCAS)^{1}	118	0.26	−0.22	0	±0
Blank ballots	716	1.57	−0.65		
**Total**	**45,740**			**25**	**±0**
Valid votes	45,740	98.90	−0.39		
Invalid votes	510	1.10	+0.39		
**Votes cast / turnout**	**46,250**	**75.17**	**+5.55**		
Abstentions	15,279	24.83	−5.55		
**Registered voters**	**61,529**				
Sources
Footnotes: ^{1} Independent Regional Unity–Castilian Party results are compared to Commoners' Land totals in the 2007 election.

== See also ==
- 2011 Castilian-Manchegan regional election
