= Regionalist Party of Guadalajara =

Political party in Spain

Regionalist Party of Guadalajara Partido Regionalista de Guadalajara
- Leader: Alberto Ángel Rojo Rojo
- Founded: 1988
- Ideology: Guadalajaran regionalism Anti-nuclear
- Political position: Centre-left
- Local Government (2011): 2 / 1,414

Regionalist Party of Guadalajara (in Spanish: Partido Regionalista de Guadalajara, PRGU) is a political party in the province of Guadalajara, Spain. PRGU was founded in 1988.

Following the 1999 municipal elections, PRGU entered into a government coalition with the Spanish Socialist Workers' Party (PSOE) in the municipality of Villanueva de la Torre. However, in 2002 two councilmembers of PRGU, Juan Pablo Cobos and Javier Baranda, voted against the mayor, which led to Partido Popular taking over the municipal government. The two councilmembers were expelled from PRGU and later joined PP.

PRGU supports the struggle against the Zorita nuclear power plant.

The regional elections of Castilla-La Mancha in 2003 PRGU got 514 votes. In the 2004 parliamentary elections PRGU obtained 325 votes.
