= 2007 Spanish local elections in the Community of Madrid =

This article presents the results breakdown of the local elections held in the Community of Madrid on 27 May 2007. The following tables show detailed results in the autonomous community's most populous municipalities, sorted alphabetically.

== City control ==
The following table lists party control in the most populous municipalities, including provincial capitals (shown in bold). Gains for a party are displayed with the cell's background shaded in that party's colour.

Municipality	Population	Previous control	New control
Alcalá de Henares	201,380	People's Party (PP)	People's Party (PP)
Alcobendas	104,118	Spanish Socialist Workers' Party (PSOE)	People's Party (PP)
Alcorcón	164,633	Spanish Socialist Workers' Party (PSOE)	Spanish Socialist Workers' Party (PSOE)
Coslada	83,233	People's Party (PP)	Spanish Socialist Workers' Party (PSOE)
Fuenlabrada	193,715	Spanish Socialist Workers' Party (PSOE)	Spanish Socialist Workers' Party (PSOE)
Getafe	156,320	Spanish Socialist Workers' Party (PSOE)	Spanish Socialist Workers' Party (PSOE)
Las Rozas de Madrid	75,719	People's Party (PP)	People's Party (PP)
Leganés	182,471	Spanish Socialist Workers' Party (PSOE)	People's Party (PP) (PSOE in 2007)
**Madrid**	3,128,600	People's Party (PP)	People's Party (PP)
Móstoles	206,301	People's Party (PP)	People's Party (PP)
Parla	95,087	Spanish Socialist Workers' Party (PSOE)	Spanish Socialist Workers' Party (PSOE)
Pozuelo de Alarcón	79,581	People's Party (PP)	People's Party (PP)
Torrejón de Ardoz	112,114	Spanish Socialist Workers' Party (PSOE)	People's Party (PP)

== Municipalities ==
=== Alcalá de Henares ===
Population: 201,380

← Summary of the 27 May 2007 City Council of Alcalá de Henares election results →
Parties and alliances	Popular vote			Seats	
Parties and alliances	Votes	%	±pp	Total	+/−
People's Party (PP)	42,356	48.83	+1.49	14	±0
Spanish Socialist Workers' Party (PSOE)	32,192	37.11	+4.36	11	+1
United Left of the Community of Madrid (IUCM)	6,034	6.96	−4.40	2	−1
Habitable Alcalá (AH)	1,945	2.24	New	0	±0
The Greens of the Community of Madrid (LVCM)	1,348	1.55	−0.02	0	±0
Spanish Democratic Party (PADE)	317	0.37	New	0	±0
The Phalanx (FE)	310	0.36	+0.15	0	±0
Internationalist Solidarity and Self-Management (SAIn)	289	0.33	New	0	±0
Republican Left (IR)	185	0.21	New	0	±0
Democratic Solidarity (SD)	108	0.12	New	0	±0
Humanist Party (PH)	98	0.11	−0.15	0	±0
Blank ballots	1,561	1.80	−0.64		
Total	86,743			27	±0
Valid votes	86,743	99.61	+0.26		
Invalid votes	336	0.39	−0.26		
Votes cast / turnout	87,079	62.98	−1.76		
Abstentions	51,187	37.02	+1.76		
Registered voters	138,266				

=== Alcobendas ===
Population: 104,118

← Summary of the 27 May 2007 City Council of Alcobendas election results →
Parties and alliances	Popular vote			Seats	
Parties and alliances	Votes	%	±pp	Total	+/−
People's Party (PP)	24,892	49.89	+8.33	14	+2
Spanish Socialist Workers' Party (PSOE)	18,337	36.75	−6.85	11	−1
United Left of the Community of Madrid (IUCM)	4,013	8.04	+1.31	2	+1
The Greens of the Community of Madrid (LVCM)	874	1.75	−0.58	0	±0
Spanish Democratic Party (PADE)	279	0.56	−1.60	0	±0
Democratic and Social Centre (CDS)	196	0.39	New	0	±0
Spanish Alternative (AES)	128	0.26	New	0	±0
Humanist Party (PH)	108	0.22	−0.19	0	±0
Blank ballots	1,068	2.14	−0.01		
Total	49,895			27	+2
Valid votes	49,895	99.28	−0.24		
Invalid votes	363	0.72	+0.24		
Votes cast / turnout	50,258	67.34	−2.28		
Abstentions	24,378	32.66	+2.28		
Registered voters	74,636				

=== Alcorcón ===
Population: 164,633

← Summary of the 27 May 2007 City Council of Alcorcón election results →
Parties and alliances	Popular vote			Seats	
Parties and alliances	Votes	%	±pp	Total	+/−
Spanish Socialist Workers' Party (PSOE)	39,487	46.81	+1.62	14	±0
People's Party (PP)	35,567	42.17	+3.54	12	+1
United Left of the Community of Madrid (IUCM)	4,847	5.75	−3.16	1	−1
The Greens–Green Group (LV–GV)	2,289	2.71	New	0	±0
Spanish Democratic Centre (CDEs)	276	0.33	New	0	±0
Communist Party of the Peoples of Spain (PCPE)	248	0.29	+0.07	0	±0
Blank ballots	1,633	1.94	−0.39		
Total	84,347			27	±0
Valid votes	84,347	99.41	−0.04		
Invalid votes	500	0.59	+0.04		
Votes cast / turnout	84,847	67.19	−0.26		
Abstentions	41,439	32.81	+0.26		
Registered voters	126,286				

=== Coslada ===
Population: 83,233

← Summary of the 27 May 2007 City Council of Coslada election results →
Parties and alliances	Popular vote			Seats	
Parties and alliances	Votes	%	±pp	Total	+/−
People's Party (PP)	16,617	40.24	+11.94	12	+5
Spanish Socialist Workers' Party (PSOE)	13,846	33.53	+8.68	9	+2
United Left of the Community of Madrid (IUCM)	5,053	12.24	−6.84	3	−2
Left Platform of Coslada (PIC)	2,401	5.81	−18.74	1	−5
Republican Group of Coslada (ARCO)	1,173	2.84	New	0	±0
The Greens–Green Group (LV–GV)	795	1.93	New	0	±0
Coslada and San Fernando Citizens (CCSF)	611	1.48	New	0	±0
Blank ballots	800	1.94	−0.01		
Total	41,296			25	±0
Valid votes	41,296	99.44	−0.04		
Invalid votes	233	0.56	+0.04		
Votes cast / turnout	41,529	67.75	−1.53		
Abstentions	19,764	32.25	+1.53		
Registered voters	61,293				

=== Fuenlabrada ===
Population: 193,715

← Summary of the 27 May 2007 City Council of Fuenlabrada election results →
Parties and alliances	Popular vote			Seats	
Parties and alliances	Votes	%	±pp	Total	+/−
Spanish Socialist Workers' Party (PSOE)	44,684	54.16	−3.23	16	−1
People's Party (PP)	25,880	31.37	+2.93	9	+1
United Left of the Community of Madrid (IUCM)	6,984	8.46	−0.05	2	±0
Popular Democrats of Fuenlabrada (DPF)	2,795	3.39	New	0	±0
Humanist Party (PH)	692	0.84	New	0	±0
Blank ballots	1,471	1.78	+0.25		
Total	82,506			27	±0
Valid votes	82,506	99.49	−0.08		
Invalid votes	425	0.51	+0.08		
Votes cast / turnout	82,931	59.81	−3.13		
Abstentions	55,730	40.19	+3.13		
Registered voters	138,661				

=== Getafe ===
Population: 156,320

← Summary of the 27 May 2007 City Council of Getafe election results →
Parties and alliances	Popular vote			Seats	
Parties and alliances	Votes	%	±pp	Total	+/−
Spanish Socialist Workers' Party (PSOE)	35,271	44.20	−2.18	13	±0
People's Party (PP)	29,016	36.36	+2.70	11	+1
United Left of the Community of Madrid (IUCM)	9,348	11.71	−1.57	3	−1
Town Winds Neighbours' Association (AVVP)	3,032	3.80	New	0	±0
The Greens–Diverse Citizens Coalition (VCD)	1,179	1.48	−0.75	0	±0
Internationalist Socialist Workers' Party (POSI)	343	0.43	−0.02	0	±0
Blank ballots	1,608	2.02	−0.03		
Total	79,797			27	±0
Valid votes	79,797	99.41	−0.01		
Invalid votes	474	0.59	+0.01		
Votes cast / turnout	80,271	67.28	−3.32		
Abstentions	39,046	32.72	+3.32		
Registered voters	119,317				

=== Las Rozas de Madrid ===
Population: 75,719

← Summary of the 27 May 2007 City Council of Las Rozas de Madrid election results →
Parties and alliances	Popular vote			Seats	
Parties and alliances	Votes	%	±pp	Total	+/−
People's Party (PP)	23,827	59.70	+8.85	17	+2
Spanish Socialist Workers' Party (PSOE)	11,000	27.56	−6.06	7	−2
United Left of the Community of Madrid (IUCM)	2,002	5.02	−0.17	1	±0
The Greens of the Community of Madrid (LVCM)	1,143	2.86	+1.04	0	±0
Spanish Democratic Party (PADE)	378	0.95	+0.20	0	±0
Blank ballots	1,558	3.90	−0.05		
Total	39,908			25	±0
Valid votes	39,908	99.46	−0.06		
Invalid votes	216	0.54	+0.06		
Votes cast / turnout	40,124	71.74	−2.05		
Abstentions	15,808	28.26	+2.05		
Registered voters	55,932				

=== Leganés ===
Population: 182,471

← Summary of the 27 May 2007 City Council of Leganés election results →
Parties and alliances	Popular vote			Seats	
Parties and alliances	Votes	%	±pp	Total	+/−
People's Party (PP)	36,283	39.41	+2.07	12	+1
Spanish Socialist Workers' Party (PSOE)	35,213	38.25	+1.80	11	±0
United Left of the Community of Madrid (IUCM)	11,920	12.95	−3.74	3	−2
Union for Leganés (ULEG)	5,422	5.89	+4.20	1	+1
The Greens Coalition (CV)	1,228	1.33	−1.44	0	±0
Citizens for Leganés (CL)	320	0.35	New	0	±0
Communist Party of the Peoples of Spain (PCPE)	315	0.34	New	0	±0
Blank ballots	1,367	1.48	−0.51		
Total	92,068			27	±0
Valid votes	92,068	99.52	+0.17		
Invalid votes	446	0.48	−0.17		
Votes cast / turnout	92,514	66.63	−1.36		
Abstentions	46,337	33.37	+1.36		
Registered voters	138,851				

=== Madrid ===
Population: 3,128,600

=== Móstoles ===
Population: 206,301

← Summary of the 27 May 2007 City Council of Móstoles election results →
Parties and alliances	Popular vote			Seats	
Parties and alliances	Votes	%	±pp	Total	+/−
People's Party (PP)	53,350	54.09	+8.32	16	+2
Spanish Socialist Workers' Party (PSOE)	35,040	35.52	+0.13	10	±0
United Left of the Community of Madrid (IUCM)	6,061	6.14	−4.25	1	−2
The Greens of Madrid (LVM)	2,116	2.15	New	0	±0
Spanish Alternative (AES)	406	0.41	New	0	±0
Blank ballots	1,667	1.69	−0.54		
Total	98,640			27	±0
Valid votes	98,640	99.53	+0.23		
Invalid votes	466	0.47	−0.23		
Votes cast / turnout	99,106	64.41	−1.10		
Abstentions	54,750	35.59	+1.10		
Registered voters	153,856				

=== Parla ===
Population: 95,087

← Summary of the 27 May 2007 City Council of Parla election results →
Parties and alliances	Popular vote			Seats	
Parties and alliances	Votes	%	±pp	Total	+/−
Spanish Socialist Workers' Party (PSOE)	29,281	74.43	−0.92	20	±0
People's Party (PP)	6,534	16.61	+1.12	4	±0
United Left of the Community of Madrid (IUCM)	2,421	6.15	−0.18	1	±0
The Greens of the Community of Madrid (LVCM)	501	1.27	+0.63	0	±0
Humanist Party (PH)	68	0.17	New	0	±0
Blank ballots	537	1.36	+0.41		
Total	39,342			25	±0
Valid votes	39,342	99.51	+0.02		
Invalid votes	195	0.49	−0.02		
Votes cast / turnout	39,537	63.12	−3.38		
Abstentions	23,101	36.88	+3.38		
Registered voters	62,638				

=== Pozuelo de Alarcón ===
Population: 79,581

← Summary of the 27 May 2007 City Council of Pozuelo de Alarcón election results →
Parties and alliances	Popular vote			Seats	
Parties and alliances	Votes	%	±pp	Total	+/−
People's Party (PP)	27,455	63.18	+6.24	19	+3
Spanish Socialist Workers' Party (PSOE)	9,735	23.82	−9.09	6	−3
Independents for Pozuelo Candidacy (CIPP)	1,052	2.57	New	0	±0
United Left of the Community of Madrid (IUCM)	1,000	2.45	+0.18	0	±0
The Greens–Green Group (LV–GV)	599	1.47	New	0	±0
Blank ballots	1,025	2.51	−0.06		
Total	40,866			25	±0
Valid votes	40,866	99.58	−0.08		
Invalid votes	174	0.42	+0.08		
Votes cast / turnout	41,040	72.70	−1.69		
Abstentions	15,413	27.30	+1.69		
Registered voters	56,453				

=== Torrejón de Ardoz ===
Population: 112,114

← Summary of the 27 May 2007 City Council of Torrejón de Ardoz election results →
Parties and alliances	Popular vote			Seats	
Parties and alliances	Votes	%	±pp	Total	+/−
People's Party (PP)	21,157	43.27	+12.50	14	+5
Spanish Socialist Workers' Party (PSOE)	19,199	39.27	−1.76	12	±0
United Left of the Community of Madrid (IUCM)	2,959	6.05	−2.22	1	−1
Citizen Unity (UC)	1,999	4.09	−2.52	0	−2
Spanish Democratic Party (PADE)	1,021	2.09	−6.01	0	−2
The Greens (LV)	776	1.59	−0.66	0	±0
Citizens for Torrejón–Green Alternative (CT–AV)	753	1.54	New	0	±0
New Social Order (NOS)	138	0.28	New	0	±0
Blank ballots	889	1.82	+0.23		
Total	48,891			27	±0
Valid votes	48,891	99.53	+0.08		
Invalid votes	233	0.47	−0.08		
Votes cast / turnout	49,124	63.20	−1.44		
Abstentions	28,607	36.80	+1.44		
Registered voters	77,731				

== See also ==
- 2007 Madrilenian regional election
