= 2003 Spanish local elections in the Community of Madrid =

This article presents the results breakdown of the local elections held in the Community of Madrid on 25 May 2003. The following tables show detailed results in the autonomous community's most populous municipalities, sorted alphabetically.

== City control ==
The following table lists party control in the most populous municipalities, including provincial capitals (highlighted in bold). Gains for a party are highlighted in that party's colour.

Municipality	Population	Previous control	New control
Alcalá de Henares	179,602	Spanish Socialist Workers' Party (PSOE)	People's Party (PP)
Alcobendas	95,104	Spanish Socialist Workers' Party (PSOE)	Spanish Socialist Workers' Party (PSOE)
Alcorcón	149,594	People's Party (PP)	Spanish Socialist Workers' Party (PSOE)
Coslada	79,862	Spanish Socialist Workers' Party (PSOE)	People's Party (PP)
Fuenlabrada	179,735	Spanish Socialist Workers' Party (PSOE)	Spanish Socialist Workers' Party (PSOE)
Getafe	153,868	Spanish Socialist Workers' Party (PSOE)	Spanish Socialist Workers' Party (PSOE)
Leganés	174,436	Spanish Socialist Workers' Party (PSOE)	Spanish Socialist Workers' Party (PSOE)
**Madrid**	3,016,788	People's Party (PP)	People's Party (PP)
Móstoles	198,819	Spanish Socialist Workers' Party (PSOE)	People's Party (PP)
Parla	80,545	Spanish Socialist Workers' Party (PSOE)	Spanish Socialist Workers' Party (PSOE)
Torrejón de Ardoz	101,056	Spanish Socialist Workers' Party (PSOE)	Spanish Socialist Workers' Party (PSOE)

== Municipalities ==
=== Alcalá de Henares ===
Population: 179,602

← Summary of the 25 May 2003 City Council of Alcalá de Henares election results →
Parties and alliances	Popular vote			Seats	
Parties and alliances	Votes	%	±pp	Total	+/−
People's Party (PP)	42,738	47.34	+4.58	14	+2
Spanish Socialist Workers' Party (PSOE)	29,561	32.75	−4.01	10	−1
United Left of the Community of Madrid (IUCM)	10,257	11.36	−2.30	3	−1
The Greens (LV)	2,114	2.34	+0.01	0	±0
The Greens of the Community of Madrid (LVCM)	1,417	1.57	New	0	±0
National Democracy (DN)	1,286	1.42	+1.10	0	±0
Humanist Party (PH)	233	0.26	−0.07	0	±0
The Phalanx (FE)	189	0.21	−0.08	0	±0
Commoners' Land–Castilian Nationalist Party (TC–PNC)	170	0.19	New	0	±0
Madrilenian Independent Regional Party (PRIM)	105	0.12	−0.11	0	±0
Blank ballots	2,206	2.44	−0.19		
Total	90,276			27	±0
Valid votes	90,276	99.35	−0.05		
Invalid votes	591	0.65	+0.05		
Votes cast / turnout	90,867	64.74	+7.90		
Abstentions	49,486	35.26	−7.90		
Registered voters	140,353				

=== Alcobendas ===
Population: 95,104

← Summary of the 25 May 2003 City Council of Alcobendas election results →
Parties and alliances	Popular vote			Seats	
Parties and alliances	Votes	%	±pp	Total	+/−
Spanish Socialist Workers' Party (PSOE)	21,850	43.60	−3.74	12	−1
People's Party (PP)	20,829	41.56	+2.10	12	+2
United Left of the Community of Madrid (IUCM)	3,374	6.73	−0.57	1	−1
The Greens of the Community of Madrid (LVCM)	1,168	2.33	New	0	±0
Independents for Alcobendas–Spanish Democratic Party (IA–PADE)	1,080	2.16	+1.83	0	±0
The Greens (LV)	529	1.06	−0.81	0	±0
Humanist Party (PH)	206	0.41	New	0	±0
Blank ballots	1,077	2.15	−0.24		
Total	50,113			25	±0
Valid votes	50,113	99.52	−0.08		
Invalid votes	241	0.48	+0.08		
Votes cast / turnout	50,354	69.62	+6.94		
Abstentions	21,969	30.38	−6.94		
Registered voters	72,323				

=== Alcorcón ===
Population: 149,594

← Summary of the 25 May 2003 City Council of Alcorcón election results →
Parties and alliances	Popular vote			Seats	
Parties and alliances	Votes	%	±pp	Total	+/−
Spanish Socialist Workers' Party (PSOE)	40,032	45.19	+7.82	14	+3
People's Party (PP)	34,221	38.63	−6.96	11	−3
United Left of the Community of Madrid (IUCM)	7,893	8.91	−0.79	2	±0
Democratic and Social Centre (CDS)	1,950	2.20	+0.53	0	±0
The Greens of the Community of Madrid (LVCM)	947	1.07	New	0	±0
The Greens (LV)	889	1.00	−0.75	0	±0
Independent Spanish Phalanx (FEI)	213	0.24	New	0	±0
Communist Party of the Peoples of Spain (PCPE)	199	0.22	−0.24	0	±0
Humanist Party (PH)	132	0.15	−0.27	0	±0
Liberal Centrist Union (UCL)	56	0.06	New	0	±0
Blank ballots	2,060	2.33	−0.21		
Total	88,592			27	±0
Valid votes	88,592	99.45	±0.00		
Invalid votes	490	0.55	±0.00		
Votes cast / turnout	89,082	67.45	+9.51		
Abstentions	42,980	32.55	−9.51		
Registered voters	132,062				

=== Coslada ===
Population: 79,862

← Summary of the 25 May 2003 City Council of Coslada election results →
Parties and alliances	Popular vote			Seats	
Parties and alliances	Votes	%	±pp	Total	+/−
People's Party (PP)	11,857	28.30	−0.07	7	±0
Spanish Socialist Workers' Party (PSOE)	10,413	24.85	−6.49	7	−1
Left Platform of Coslada (PIC)	10,285	24.55	+9.36	6	+2
United Left of the Community of Madrid (IUCM)	7,995	19.08	−3.11	5	−1
Democratic and Social Centre (CDS)	533	1.27	New	0	±0
Blank ballots	815	1.95	+0.05		
Total	41,898			25	±0
Valid votes	41,898	99.48	−0.14		
Invalid votes	219	0.52	+0.14		
Votes cast / turnout	42,117	69.28	+10.80		
Abstentions	18,678	30.72	−10.80		
Registered voters	60,795				

=== Fuenlabrada ===
Population: 179,735

← Summary of the 25 May 2003 City Council of Fuenlabrada election results →
Parties and alliances	Popular vote			Seats	
Parties and alliances	Votes	%	±pp	Total	+/−
Spanish Socialist Workers' Party (PSOE)	50,474	57.39	−4.58	17	−1
People's Party (PP)	25,011	28.44	+2.77	8	+1
United Left of the Community of Madrid (IUCM)	7,481	8.51	+0.59	2	±0
The Greens of the Community of Madrid (LVCM)	1,294	1.47	New	0	±0
The Greens (LV)	1,049	1.19	−0.38	0	±0
Independent New Alternative for Fuenlabrada (NAIF)	761	0.87	New	0	±0
Left of Fuenlabrada (IF)	538	0.61	New	0	±0
Blank ballots	1,343	1.53	+0.21		
Total	87,951			27	±0
Valid votes	87,951	99.57	−0.07		
Invalid votes	382	0.43	+0.07		
Votes cast / turnout	88,333	62.94	+5.85		
Abstentions	52,022	37.06	−5.85		
Registered voters	140,355				

=== Getafe ===
Population: 153,868

← Summary of the 25 May 2003 City Council of Getafe election results →
Parties and alliances	Popular vote			Seats	
Parties and alliances	Votes	%	±pp	Total	+/−
Spanish Socialist Workers' Party (PSOE)	40,025	46.38	−5.42	13	−2
People's Party (PP)	29,048	33.66	+4.08	10	+1
United Left of the Community of Madrid (IUCM)	11,463	13.28	+0.98	4	+1
The Greens (LV)	1,928	2.23	+0.18	0	±0
The Greens of the Community of Madrid (LVCM)	1,304	1.51	New	0	±0
Internationalist Socialist Workers' Party (POSI)	389	0.45	New	0	±0
Party of Self-employed, Retirees and Widows (PAJV)	375	0.43	New	0	±0
Blank ballots	1,770	2.05	−0.09		
Total	86,302			27	±0
Valid votes	86,302	99.42	+0.69		
Invalid votes	503	0.58	−0.69		
Votes cast / turnout	86,805	70.60	+7.31		
Abstentions	36,155	29.40	−7.31		
Registered voters	122,960				

=== Leganés ===
Population: 174,436

← Summary of the 25 May 2003 City Council of Leganés election results →
Parties and alliances	Popular vote			Seats	
Parties and alliances	Votes	%	±pp	Total	+/−
People's Party (PP)	35,637	37.34	+5.21	11	+2
Spanish Socialist Workers' Party (PSOE)	34,793	36.45	−8.63	11	−3
United Left of the Community of Madrid (IUCM)	15,929	16.69	+1.77	5	+1
The Greens (LV)	2,642	2.77	+0.90	0	±0
Town Winds Neighbourhood Platform (PVVP)	2,425	2.54	New	0	±0
Union for Leganés (ULEG)	1,613	1.69	New	0	±0
Spanish Democratic Party (PADE)	371	0.39	New	0	±0
Liberal Centrist Union (UCL)	130	0.14	New	0	±0
Blank ballots	1,902	1.99	−0.51		
Total	95,442			27	±0
Valid votes	95,442	99.35	+0.15		
Invalid votes	620	0.65	−0.15		
Votes cast / turnout	96,062	67.99	+8.17		
Abstentions	45,222	32.01	−8.17		
Registered voters	141,284				

=== Madrid ===
Population: 3,016,788

=== Móstoles ===
Population: 198,819

← Summary of the 25 May 2003 City Council of Móstoles election results →
Parties and alliances	Popular vote			Seats	
Parties and alliances	Votes	%	±pp	Total	+/−
People's Party (PP)	46,915	45.77	+2.67	14	+1
Spanish Socialist Workers' Party (PSOE)	36,273	35.39	−0.70	10	−1
United Left of the Community of Madrid (IUCM)	10,652	10.39	−0.85	3	±0
The Greens (LV)	3,342	3.26	−0.48	0	±0
The Greens of the Community of Madrid (LVCM)	1,675	1.63	New	0	±0
United for Coimbra Independent Party (PIUC)	839	0.82	New	0	±0
Independent Spanish Phalanx–Phalanx 2000 (FEI–FE 2000)	273	0.27	New	0	±0
Humanist Party (PH)	246	0.24	+0.11	0	±0
Blank ballots	2,287	2.23	−0.16		
Total	102,502			27	±0
Valid votes	102,502	99.30	−0.24		
Invalid votes	724	0.70	+0.24		
Votes cast / turnout	103,226	65.51	+4.84		
Abstentions	54,350	34.49	−4.84		
Registered voters	157,576				

=== Parla ===
Population: 80,545

← Summary of the 25 May 2003 City Council of Parla election results →
Parties and alliances	Popular vote			Seats	
Parties and alliances	Votes	%	±pp	Total	+/−
Spanish Socialist Workers' Party (PSOE)	30,133	75.35	+34.33	20	+9
People's Party (PP)	6,193	15.49	−18.17	4	−5
United Left of the Community of Madrid (IUCM)	2,530	6.33	−12.07	1	−4
The Greens (LV)	267	0.67	New	0	±0
The Greens of the Community of Madrid (LVCM)	254	0.64	New	0	±0
Independent Progressive Party (PPI)	237	0.59	−3.17	0	±0
Blank ballots	379	0.95	−0.83		
Total	39,993			25	±0
Valid votes	39,993	99.49	−0.04		
Invalid votes	204	0.51	+0.04		
Votes cast / turnout	40,197	66.50	+12.00		
Abstentions	20,247	33.50	−12.00		
Registered voters	60,444				

=== Torrejón de Ardoz ===
Population: 101,056

← Summary of the 25 May 2003 City Council of Torrejón de Ardoz election results →
Parties and alliances	Popular vote			Seats	
Parties and alliances	Votes	%	±pp	Total	+/−
Spanish Socialist Workers' Party (PSOE)	20,013	41.03	+7.61	12	+2
People's Party (PP)	15,008	30.77	+4.41	9	+2
United Left of the Community of Madrid (IUCM)	4,033	8.27	−1.53	2	±0
Spanish Democratic Party (PADE)	3,949	8.10	−8.41	2	−2
Citizen Unity (UC)	3,223	6.61	−0.90	2	±0
The Greens (LV)	1,097	2.25	+0.19	0	±0
National Democracy (DN)	582	1.19	New	0	±0
Democratic and Social Centre (CDS)	95	0.19	−0.25	0	±0
Blank ballots	778	1.59	−0.95		
Total	48,778			27	+2
Valid votes	48,778	99.45	+0.15		
Invalid votes	269	0.55	−0.15		
Votes cast / turnout	49,047	64.64	+8.00		
Abstentions	26,827	35.36	−8.00		
Registered voters	75,874				

== See also ==
- May 2003 Madrilenian regional election
- October 2003 Madrilenian regional election
