= Opinion polling for the 2015 Spanish local elections (Community of Madrid) =

In the run up to the 2015 Spanish local elections, various organisations carried out opinion polling to gauge voting intention in local entities in Spain. Results of such polls for municipalities in the Community of Madrid are displayed in this article. The date range for these opinion polls is from the previous local elections, held on 22 May 2011, to the day the next elections were held, on 24 May 2015.

Polls are listed in reverse chronological order, showing the most recent first and using the dates when the survey fieldwork was done, as opposed to the date of publication. Where the fieldwork dates are unknown, the date of publication is given instead. The highest percentage figure in each polling survey is displayed with its background shaded in the leading party's colour. If a tie ensues, this is applied to the figures with the highest percentages. The "Lead" columns on the right shows the percentage-point difference between the parties with the highest percentages in a given poll.

== Municipalities ==
=== Alcalá de Henares ===
Color key:

Exit poll

Polling firm/Commissioner	Fieldwork date	Sample size	Turnout	PP	PSOE	IUCM–LV	UPyD	E-2000	SA	C's	Lead
2015 municipal election	24 May 2015	—N/a	66.0	24.1; 8	23.8; 7	5.3; 1	2.9; 0	5.8; 1	20.5; 6	13.5; 4	0.3
TNS Demoscopia/RTVE–FORTA	24 May 2015	?	?	23.2; 7/8	22.8; 6/7	6.5; 1/2	–	–	21.8; 6/7	14.1; 4/5	0.4
PSOE	27 Apr–1 May 2015	?	?	? 8	? 6	? 1	? 1	? 1	? 5	? 5	?
Llorente & Cuenca	31 Oct 2014	?	?	? 8/10	? 7/9	? 2/4	? 2/3	–	? 7/9	–	?
2011 municipal election	22 May 2011	—N/a	65.8	40.7; 12	31.9; 9	9.7; 3	7.1; 2	5.2; 1	–	–	8.8

=== Alcobendas ===
Polling firm/Commissioner	Fieldwork date	Sample size	Turnout	PP	UPyD	PSOE	IUCM–LV	SSPxM	C's	Lead
2015 municipal election	24 May 2015	—N/a	67.5	38.5; 12	5.8; 1	21.9; 7	5.0; 1	10.4; 3	11.7; 3	16.6
Metroscopia/PP	Oct 2014	500	?	? 14	? 4	? 7	? 2	–	–	?
2011 municipal election	22 May 2011	—N/a	68.6	49.7; 15	19.2; 5	19.1; 5	6.8; 2	–	–	30.5

=== Alcorcón ===
Color key:

Exit poll

Polling firm/Commissioner	Fieldwork date	Sample size	Turnout	PP	PSOE	IUCM–LV	UPyD	GA	C's	LV–GV	Lead
2015 municipal election	24 May 2015	—N/a	70.1	31.1; 10	24.3; 7	5.9; 1	4.0; 0	17.4; 5	12.7; 4	3.0; 0	6.8
TNS Demoscopia/RTVE–FORTA	24 May 2015	?	?	30.6; 8/10	22.8; 6/7	6.2; 1/2	–	20.3; 5/6	13.0; 3/4	–	7.8
PP	5 May 2015	?	?	? 13	? 6	? 0	? 0	? 2	? 4	? 2	?
Sigma Dos/Al Cabo de la Calle	31 Mar–7 Apr 2015	800	?	39.8; 11/13	24.6; 7/8	3.5; 0	1.8; 0	13.4; 4	12.3; 3/4	–	15.2
PP	25 Feb 2015	?	?	? 13	? 5	? 1	–	? 6	? 2	–	?
Llorente & Cuenca	31 Oct 2014	?	?	? 9/11	? 6/8	? 2/4	? 2	? 5/8	–	–	?
2011 municipal election	22 May 2011	—N/a	70.0	48.4; 15	31.4; 9	8.8; 2	5.9; 1	–	–	–	27.7

=== Arroyomolinos ===
Polling firm/Commissioner	Fieldwork date	Sample size	Turnout	PP	PIArr	PSOE	UPyD	IUCM–LV	ASP	C's	Lead
2015 municipal election	24 May 2015	—N/a	68.8	28.3; 7	13.0; 3	11.1; 3	4.4; 0	4.2; 0	13.5; 3	19.4; 5	8.9
Sigma Dos/Al Cabo de la Calle	7–9 May 2015	500	?	33.6; 8	7.6; 1/2	11.5; 2/3	2.7; 0	3.9; 0	11.3; 2/3	27.5; 7	6.1
Sigma Dos/Al Cabo de la Calle	18–21 Mar 2015	500	?	34.4; 7/9	7.2; 1	13.6; 3	9.4; 2	5.7; 0/1	9.5; 2	17.3; 4/5	17.1
2011 municipal election	22 May 2011	—N/a	68.7	45.0; 9	23.1; 4	11.2; 2	7.3; 1	7.1; 1	–	–	21.9

=== Coslada ===
Polling firm/Commissioner	Fieldwork date	Sample size	Turnout	PP	PSOE	IUCM–LV	UPyD	ARCO	SmC	C's	Lead
2015 municipal election	24 May 2015	—N/a	69.6	24.9; 7	23.0; 6	10.5; 3	3.1; 0	5.3; 1	19.4; 5	11.1; 3	1.9
PSOE	27 Apr–1 May 2015	?	?	? 6	? 6	? 2	? 0/1	? 0/1	? 5	? 5	Tie
2011 municipal election	22 May 2011	—N/a	68.2	39.4; 11	27.3; 8	13.2; 3	7.9; 2	5.8; 1	–	–	12.1

=== Fuenlabrada ===
Color key:

Exit poll

Polling firm/Commissioner	Fieldwork date	Sample size	Turnout	PSOE	PP	IUCM–LV	UPyD	GF	C's	Lead
2015 municipal election	24 May 2015	—N/a	64.9	45.2; 13	16.9; 5	5.7; 1	2.4; 0	14.5; 4	13.1; 4	28.3
TNS Demoscopia/RTVE–FORTA	24 May 2015	?	?	39.2; 10/12	21.2; 6/7	7.0; 1/2	–	15.7; 4/5	10.5; 2/3	18.0
Sigma Dos/Al Cabo de la Calle	7–9 May 2015	800	?	46.6; 14	17.8; 5	5.0; 0/1	2.2; 0	12.8; 3/4	13.3; 4	28.8
Sigma Dos/Al Cabo de la Calle	18–22 Mar 2015	800	?	46.3; 14	25.8; 7/8	5.0; 0/1	3.1; 0	9.4; 3	7.2; 2	20.5
PP	25 Feb 2015	?	?	? 7	? 12	? 1	–	? 5	? 2	?
2011 municipal election	22 May 2011	—N/a	63.3	41.1; 12	38.4; 11	10.7; 3	5.7; 1	–	–	2.7

=== Getafe ===
Color key:

Exit poll

Polling firm/Commissioner	Fieldwork date	Sample size	Turnout	PP	PSOE	IUCM–LV	UPyD	AG	C's	Lead
2015 municipal election	24 May 2015	—N/a	70.1	28.6; 9	27.3; 8	5.7; 1	3.0; 0	23.6; 7	8.1; 2	1.3
TNS Demoscopia/RTVE–FORTA	24 May 2015	?	?	29.9; 8/10	24.4; 7/8	4.6; 0/1	–	24.4; 7/8	8.1; 2/3	5.5
Celeste-Tel/Getafe Capital	27 Apr–4 May 2015	700	66.7	35.5; 10	27.1; 8	9.5; 2	2.5; 0	13.8; 4	10.9; 3	8.4
Sigma Dos/Al Cabo de la Calle	17–19 Mar 2015	800	?	36.2; 11	22.8; 6/7	9.2; 2/3	3.7; 0	16.4; 5	8.3; 2	13.4
Celeste-Tel/Getafe Capital	10–14 Mar 2015	700	66.9	34.1; 10	27.9; 8	8.1; 2	4.6; 0	12.5; 4	10.4; 3	6.2
PP	25 Feb 2015	?	?	? 13	? 5	? 2	–	? 6	? 1	?
Llorente & Cuenca	31 Oct 2014	?	?	? 7/10	? 6/9	? 4/6	? 2/3	? 7/10	–	Tie
Celeste-Tel/Getafe Capital	8–15 Oct 2014	700	70.0	34.3; 10	27.2; 8	7.3; 2	5.9; 1	20.5; 6	3.2; 0	7.1
2011 municipal election	22 May 2011	—N/a	70.9	41.4; 12	31.9; 9	13.7; 4	6.5; 2	–	–	9.5

=== Humanes de Madrid ===
Polling firm/Commissioner	Fieldwork date	Sample size	Turnout	PP	PSOE	CSH	UPyD	IUCM–LV	GH	C's	Lead
2015 municipal election	24 May 2015	—N/a	68.2	42.3; 8	11.2; 2	12.1; 2	3.4; 0	5.2; 1	12.8; 2	11.6; 2	29.5
Sigma Dos/Al Cabo de la Calle	30–31 Mar 2015	500	?	42.3; 8/9	18.5; 3/4	–	3.8; 0	4.6; 0/1	10.8; 2	15.1; 3	23.8
2011 municipal election	22 May 2011	—N/a	67.6	47.8; 9	20.1; 4	14.7 (Note: Results for UCL.); 2	8.2; 1	6.2; 1	–	–	27.7

=== Leganés ===
Color key:

Exit poll

Polling firm/Commissioner	Fieldwork date	Sample size	Turnout	PP	PSOE		IUCM–LV	UPyD	L	C's	Lead
2015 municipal election	24 May 2015	—N/a	69.2	20.0; 6	21.7; 6	20.4; 6	5.3; 1	1.6; 0	21.1; 6	7.9; 2	0.6
TNS Demoscopia/RTVE–FORTA	24 May 2015	?	?	22.2; 6/7	18.0; 4/5	12.6; 3/4	5.0; 1/2	–	27.7; 8/9	9.3; 2/3	5.5
Sigma Dos/Al Cabo de la Calle	31 Mar–6 Apr 2015	800	?	24.8; 7/8	22.4; 6/7	14.3; 4	7.0; 1/2	–	18.7; 5/6	8.9; 2	2.4
PP	25 Feb 2015	?	?	? 9	? 4	? 5	? 2	–	? 5	? 2	?
T&D Iberia/El Despertador	16–23 Feb 2015	908	64.3	21.8; 7	21.0; 6	25.0; 8	8.2; 3	3.9; 0	12.3; 3	4.1; 0	3.2
Llorente & Cuenca	31 Oct 2014	?	?	? 7/9	? 5/7	–	? 3/4	–	? 6/8	–	?
2011 municipal election	22 May 2011	—N/a	69.0	40.1; 12	27.7; 8	13.3; 4	11.5; 3	4.0; 0	–	–	12.4

=== Mejorada del Campo ===
Polling firm/Commissioner	Fieldwork date	Sample size	Turnout	PP	PSOE	IUCM–LV	UPyD	MAC	GM	Lead
2015 municipal election	24 May 2015	—N/a	64.7	21.6; 5	29.3; 7	9.3; 2	11.9; 2	21.2; 5	4.3; 0	7.7
PSOE	27 Apr–1 May 2015	?	?	? 7	? 4	? 2	? 4	? 2	? 2	?
2011 municipal election	22 May 2011	—N/a	66.1	45.8; 10	25.5; 6	13.4; 3	9.2; 2	–	–	20.3

=== Moraleja de Enmedio ===
Polling firm/Commissioner	Fieldwork date	Sample size	Turnout	PP	PSOE	PDAP	IUCM–LV	UPyD	GME	C's	Lead
2015 municipal election	24 May 2015	—N/a	71.0	37.2; 5	45.6; 7	–	4.4; 0	7.0; 1	3.7; 0	–	8.4
Sigma Dos/Al Cabo de la Calle	8–12 May 2015	400	?	46.4; 6/7	36.8; 5/6	–	2.8; 0	2.2; 0	7.3; 1	–	9.6
Sigma Dos/Al Cabo de la Calle	30 Mar–6 Apr 2015	400	?	43.6; 7	31.2; 5	–	3.5; 0	2.5; 0	9.1; 1	5.7; 0	12.4
2011 municipal election	22 May 2011	—N/a	75.2	45.5; 6	34.5; 4	12.4; 1	5.0; 0	–	–	–	11.0

=== Móstoles ===
Color key:

Exit poll

Polling firm/Commissioner	Fieldwork date	Sample size	Turnout	PP	PSOE	IUCM–LV	UPyD	SA	G	Lead
2015 municipal election	24 May 2015	—N/a	65.0	36.3; 12	23.1; 7	6.0; 2	4.2; 0	19.9; 6	4.9; 0	13.2
TNS Demoscopia/RTVE–FORTA	24 May 2015	?	?	32.8; 10/12	21.4; 7/8	4.7; 0/1	3.9; 0/1	19.0; 6/7	10.1; 2/3	11.4
Llorente & Cuenca	31 Oct 2014	?	?	? 10/13	? 5/7	? 2/3	? 1/2	? 6/8	–	?
2011 municipal election	22 May 2011	—N/a	64.5	55.9; 17	24.7; 7	9.7; 3	4.5; 2	–	–	31.2

=== Pinto ===
Polling firm/Commissioner	Fieldwork date	Sample size	Turnout	PP	PSOE	GP	UPyD	IUCM–LV	C's	Lead
2015 municipal election	24 May 2015	—N/a	68.4	31.3; 7	20.9; 5	27.8; 7	4.5; 0	2.7; 0	10.0; 2	3.5
Sigma Dos/Al Cabo de la Calle	11–12 May 2015	500	?	42.9; 10/11	20.2; 4/5	20.5; 4/5	1.0; 0	1.5; 0	10.3; 2	22.4
ZigZag Digital	30 Mar–13 Apr 2015	513	?	36.2; 8/10	17.0; 4/5	21.9; 5/6	3.8; 0	4.0; 0	14.7; 3/4	14.3
Sigma Dos/Al Cabo de la Calle	6–7 Apr 2015	500	?	46.8; 11/12	15.3; 3/4	13.6; 3	2.2; 0	4.3; 0	12.2; 3	31.5
La Voz de Pinto	26 Feb–12 Mar 2015	421	74.8	22.5; 5/6	20.1; 4/5	25.7; 6/7	3.8; 0	3.2; 0	19.0; 4/5	3.2
ZigZag Digital	26 Apr–8 May 2013	416	?	38.4; 9/10	13.3; 3	20.2; 4/5	17.0; 3/4	5.1; 0/1	–	18.2
2011 municipal election	22 May 2011	—N/a	68.4	51.1; 12	22.7; 5	8.0 (Note: Results for MIA–Pinto.); 2	7.9; 2	3.5; 0	–	28.4

=== San Fernando de Henares ===
Polling firm/Commissioner	Fieldwork date	Sample size	Turnout	IUCM–LV	PP	PSOE	UPyD	SFHSP	E-2000	Lead
2015 municipal election	24 May 2015	—N/a	69.3	16.4; 4	24.6; 6	21.2; 5	4.7; 0	23.9; 5	6.5; 1	0.7
PSOE	27 Apr–1 May 2015	?	?	? 5	? 7	? 1	? 4	? 4	–	?
2011 municipal election	22 May 2011	—N/a	68.7	43.3; 10	36.7; 8	13.7; 3	3.7; 0	–	–	6.6

=== San Martín de la Vega ===
Polling firm/Commissioner	Fieldwork date	Sample size	Turnout	PP	PSOE	IUCM–LV	Ecolo	UPyD	SSPxM	UI	Lead
2015 municipal election	24 May 2015	—N/a	65.3	23.6; 5	46.0; 9	3.7; 0	–	3.5; 0	16.1; 3	4.0; 0	22.4
ZigZag Digital	7–13 May 2015	384	?	29.7; 5/6	42.6; 8/9	5.0; 0/1	–	2.0; 0	15.1; 2/3	2.5; 0	12.9
2011 municipal election	22 May 2011	—N/a	65.8	48.1; 9	30.9; 6	9.5; 1	5.1; 1	–	–	–	17.2

=== Torrejón de Ardoz ===
Polling firm/Commissioner	Fieldwork date	Sample size	Turnout	PP	PSOE	GT	SSPxM	C's	Lead
2015 municipal election	24 May 2015	—N/a	65.9	48.9; 14	15.0; 4	7.0; 2	16.3; 5	7.2; 2	32.6
PSOE	27 Apr–1 May 2015	?	?	? 9	? 5	? 3	? 5	? 5	?
2011 municipal election	22 May 2011	—N/a	67.0	68.5; 21	15.4; 4	9.3 (Note: Results for IUCM–LV.); 2	–	–	53.1
