= 1999 Spanish local elections in the Community of Madrid =

This article presents the results breakdown of the local elections held in the Community of Madrid on 13 June 1999. The following tables show detailed results in the autonomous community's most populous municipalities, sorted alphabetically.

== City control ==
The following table lists party control in the most populous municipalities, including provincial capitals (highlighted in bold). Gains for a party are highlighted in that party's colour.

Municipality	Population	Previous control	New control
Alcalá de Henares	163,831	People's Party (PP)	Spanish Socialist Workers' Party (PSOE)
Alcobendas	86,146	Spanish Socialist Workers' Party (PSOE)	Spanish Socialist Workers' Party (PSOE)
Alcorcón	143,970	Spanish Socialist Workers' Party (PSOE)	People's Party (PP)
Coslada	73,732	Left Platform of Coslada (PIC)	Spanish Socialist Workers' Party (PSOE)
Fuenlabrada	167,458	Spanish Socialist Workers' Party (PSOE)	Spanish Socialist Workers' Party (PSOE)
Getafe	143,629	Spanish Socialist Workers' Party (PSOE)	Spanish Socialist Workers' Party (PSOE)
Leganés	173,163	Spanish Socialist Workers' Party (PSOE)	Spanish Socialist Workers' Party (PSOE)
**Madrid**	2,881,506	People's Party (PP)	People's Party (PP)
Móstoles	195,311	Spanish Socialist Workers' Party (PSOE)	Spanish Socialist Workers' Party (PSOE)
Parla	71,396	Spanish Socialist Workers' Party (PSOE)	Spanish Socialist Workers' Party (PSOE)
Torrejón de Ardoz	91,186	Spanish Socialist Workers' Party (PSOE)	Spanish Socialist Workers' Party (PSOE)

== Municipalities ==
=== Alcalá de Henares ===
Population: 163,831

← Summary of the 13 June 1999 City Council of Alcalá de Henares election results →
Parties and alliances	Popular vote			Seats	
Parties and alliances	Votes	%	±pp	Total	+/−
People's Party (PP)	31,722	42.76	+4.26	12	+1
Spanish Socialist Workers' Party (PSOE)	27,269	36.76	+6.71	11	+2
United Left (IU)	10,136	13.66	−10.61	4	−3
The Greens (LV)	1,726	2.33	New	0	±0
Centrist Union–Democratic and Social Centre (UC–CDS)	314	0.42	−1.10	0	±0
Humanist Party (PH)	245	0.33	New	0	±0
National Democracy (DN)	235	0.32	New	0	±0
The Phalanx (FE)	213	0.29	New	0	±0
Spanish Democratic Party (PADE)	195	0.26	New	0	±0
Madrilenian Independent Regional Party (PRIM)	173	0.23	+0.13	0	±0
Blank ballots	1,953	2.63	+0.27		
Total	74,181			27	±0
Valid votes	74,181	99.40	−0.11		
Invalid votes	449	0.60	+0.11		
Votes cast / turnout	74,630	56.84	−9.07		
Abstentions	56,671	43.16	+9.07		
Registered voters	131,301				

=== Alcobendas ===
Population: 86,146

← Summary of the 13 June 1999 City Council of Alcobendas election results →
Parties and alliances	Popular vote			Seats	
Parties and alliances	Votes	%	±pp	Total	+/−
Spanish Socialist Workers' Party (PSOE)	20,220	47.34	+2.49	13	+1
People's Party (PP)	16,853	39.46	−1.53	10	−1
United Left (IU)	3,120	7.30	−2.99	2	±0
The Greens (LV)	799	1.87	New	0	±0
Centrist Union–Democratic and Social Centre (UC–CDS)	320	0.75	New	0	±0
Humanist Party (PH)	146	0.34	New	0	±0
Spanish Democratic Party (PADE)	143	0.33	New	0	±0
Madrilenian Independent Regional Party (PRIM)	91	0.21	New	0	±0
Blank ballots	1,019	2.39	+1.02		
Total	42,711			25	±0
Valid votes	42,711	99.60	−0.01		
Invalid votes	171	0.40	+0.01		
Votes cast / turnout	42,882	62.68	−7.73		
Abstentions	25,533	37.32	+7.73		
Registered voters	68,415				

=== Alcorcón ===
Population: 143,970

← Summary of the 13 June 1999 City Council of Alcorcón election results →
Parties and alliances	Popular vote			Seats	
Parties and alliances	Votes	%	±pp	Total	+/−
People's Party (PP)	34,516	45.59	+0.43	14	+1
Spanish Socialist Workers' Party (PSOE)	28,289	37.37	+5.15	11	+2
United Left (IU)	7,344	9.70	−9.08	2	−3
The Greens (LV)	1,323	1.75	New	0	±0
Centrist Union–Democratic and Social Centre (UC–CDS)	1,264	1.67	New	0	±0
Communist Party of the Peoples of Spain (PCPE)	346	0.46	+0.20	0	±0
Humanist Party (PH)	318	0.42	New	0	±0
Red–Green Party (PRV)	305	0.40	New	0	±0
Spanish Democratic Party (PADE)	77	0.10	New	0	±0
Blank ballots	1,923	2.54	+0.82		
Total	75,705			27	±0
Valid votes	75,705	99.45	−0.11		
Invalid votes	421	0.55	+0.11		
Votes cast / turnout	76,126	57.94	−7.57		
Abstentions	55,254	42.06	+7.57		
Registered voters	131,380				

=== Coslada ===
Population: 73,732

← Summary of the 13 June 1999 City Council of Coslada election results →
Parties and alliances	Popular vote			Seats	
Parties and alliances	Votes	%	±pp	Total	+/−
Spanish Socialist Workers' Party (PSOE)	10,676	31.34	+12.45	8	+3
People's Party (PP)	9,663	28.37	+4.34	7	+1
United Left (IU)	7,557	22.19	−30.05	6	−8
Left Platform of Coslada (PIC)	5,174	15.19	New	4	+4
Humanist Party (PH)	210	0.62	New	0	±0
Madrilenian Independent Regional Party (PRIM)	136	0.40	−0.29	0	±0
Blank ballots	646	1.90	+0.45		
Total	34,062			25	±0
Valid votes	34,062	99.62	+0.05		
Invalid votes	130	0.38	−0.05		
Votes cast / turnout	34,192	58.48	−8.06		
Abstentions	24,274	41.52	+8.06		
Registered voters	58,466				

=== Fuenlabrada ===
Population: 167,458

← Summary of the 13 June 1999 City Council of Fuenlabrada election results →
Parties and alliances	Popular vote			Seats	
Parties and alliances	Votes	%	±pp	Total	+/−
Spanish Socialist Workers' Party (PSOE)	45,166	61.97	+13.19	18	+4
People's Party (PP)	18,706	25.67	−4.27	7	−1
United Left (IU)	5,775	7.92	−10.14	2	−3
The Greens (LV)	1,141	1.57	New	0	±0
Spanish Democratic Party (PADE)	534	0.73	New	0	±0
Humanist Party (PH)	203	0.28	+0.18	0	±0
Centrist Union–Democratic and Social Centre (UC–CDS)	200	0.27	New	0	±0
The Phalanx (FE)	193	0.26	New	0	±0
Blank ballots	962	1.32	+0.38		
Total	72,880			27	±0
Valid votes	72,880	99.64	−0.08		
Invalid votes	264	0.36	+0.08		
Votes cast / turnout	73,144	57.09	−8.46		
Abstentions	54,966	42.91	+8.46		
Registered voters	128,110				

=== Getafe ===
Population: 143,629

← Summary of the 13 June 1999 City Council of Getafe election results →
Parties and alliances	Popular vote			Seats	
Parties and alliances	Votes	%	±pp	Total	+/−
Spanish Socialist Workers' Party (PSOE)	39,185	51.80	+13.52	15	+4
People's Party (PP)	22,381	29.58	−1.69	9	±0
United Left (IU)	9,307	12.30	−13.76	3	−4
The Greens (LV)	1,554	2.05	New	0	±0
Party of Self-employed of Spain and Spanish Independent Groups (PAE–I)	581	0.77	New	0	±0
Centrist Union–Democratic and Social Centre (UC–CDS)	569	0.75	−0.35	0	±0
Humanist Party (PH)	227	0.30	New	0	±0
Municipal Democratic Platform (PDM)	226	0.30	New	0	±0
Blank ballots	1,621	2.14	+0.85		
Total	75,651			27	±0
Valid votes	75,651	98.73	−0.81		
Invalid votes	974	1.27	+0.81		
Votes cast / turnout	76,625	63.29	−9.08		
Abstentions	44,436	36.71	+9.08		
Registered voters	121,061				

=== Leganés ===
Population: 173,163

← Summary of the 13 June 1999 City Council of Leganés election results →
Parties and alliances	Popular vote			Seats	
Parties and alliances	Votes	%	±pp	Total	+/−
Spanish Socialist Workers' Party (PSOE)	38,061	45.08	+9.35	14	+4
People's Party (PP)	27,129	32.13	−1.50	9	−1
United Left (IU)	12,594	14.92	−11.09	4	−3
The Greens (LV)	1,582	1.87	New	0	±0
La Fortuna Independent Group (AIF)	1,551	1.84	New	0	±0
Centrist Union–Democratic and Social Centre (UC–CDS)	528	0.63	New	0	±0
Red–Green Party (PRV)	303	0.36	New	0	±0
Humanist Party (PH)	277	0.33	+0.15	0	±0
Union Community of Madrid (UCMA)	187	0.22	New	0	±0
Commoners' Land–Castilian Nationalist Party (TC–PNC)	117	0.14	New	0	±0
Blank ballots	2,108	2.50	+0.89		
Total	84,437			27	±0
Valid votes	84,437	99.20	−0.22		
Invalid votes	681	0.80	+0.22		
Votes cast / turnout	85,118	59.82	−8.97		
Abstentions	57,166	40.18	+8.97		
Registered voters	142,284				

=== Madrid ===
Population: 2,881,506

=== Móstoles ===
Population: 195,311

← Summary of the 13 June 1999 City Council of Móstoles election results →
Parties and alliances	Popular vote			Seats	
Parties and alliances	Votes	%	±pp	Total	+/−
People's Party (PP)	38,271	43.10	+0.51	13	±0
Spanish Socialist Workers' Party (PSOE)	32,045	36.09	+10.45	11	+3
United Left (IU)	9,980	11.24	−10.79	3	−3
The Greens (LV)	3,320	3.74	New	0	±0
Olive Tree Forum (FO)	1,822	2.05	New	0	±0
Centrist Union–Democratic and Social Centre (UC–CDS)	766	0.86	−0.57	0	±0
Party of El Bierzo (PB)	234	0.26	New	0	±0
Humanist Party (PH)	118	0.13	New	0	±0
Red–Green Party (PRV)	111	0.13	New	0	±0
Blank ballots	2,119	2.39	+0.72		
Total	88,786			27	±0
Valid votes	88,786	99.54	−0.02		
Invalid votes	414	0.46	+0.02		
Votes cast / turnout	89,200	60.67	−5.25		
Abstentions	57,816	39.33	+5.25		
Registered voters	147,016				

=== Parla ===
Population: 71,396

← Summary of the 13 June 1999 City Council of Parla election results →
Parties and alliances	Popular vote			Seats	
Parties and alliances	Votes	%	±pp	Total	+/−
Spanish Socialist Workers' Party (PSOE)	12,475	41.02	+5.41	11	+2
People's Party (PP)	10,236	33.66	+5.92	9	+2
United Left (IU)	5,596	18.40	−14.55	5	−4
Independent Progressive Party (PPI)	1,144	3.76	New	0	±0
Humanist Party (PH)	237	0.78	New	0	±0
Centrist Union–Democratic and Social Centre (UC–CDS)	182	0.60	New	0	±0
Blank ballots	542	1.78	+0.61		
Total	30,412			25	±0
Valid votes	30,412	99.53	−0.08		
Invalid votes	145	0.47	+0.08		
Votes cast / turnout	30,557	54.50	−8.74		
Abstentions	25,513	45.50	+8.74		
Registered voters	56,070				

=== Torrejón de Ardoz ===
Population: 91,186

← Summary of the 13 June 1999 City Council of Torrejón de Ardoz election results →
Parties and alliances	Popular vote			Seats	
Parties and alliances	Votes	%	±pp	Total	+/−
Spanish Socialist Workers' Party (PSOE)	13,145	33.42	+9.57	10	+3
People's Party (PP)	10,370	26.36	−11.96	7	−4
Spanish Democratic Party (PADE)	6,493	16.51	New	4	+4
United Left (IU)	3,854	9.80	−10.85	2	−4
Citizen Unity (UC)	2,954	7.51	+1.32	2	+1
The Greens (LV)	812	2.06	New	0	±0
Independent Democratic Group (GDI)	460	1.17	New	0	±0
Centrist Union–Democratic and Social Centre (UC–CDS)	173	0.44	−0.81	0	±0
Humanist Party (PH)	75	0.19	New	0	±0
Blank ballots	999	2.54	+0.54		
Total	39,335			25	±0
Valid votes	39,335	99.30	−0.28		
Invalid votes	276	0.70	+0.28		
Votes cast / turnout	39,611	56.64	−8.08		
Abstentions	30,329	43.36	+8.08		
Registered voters	69,940				

== See also ==
- 1999 Madrilenian regional election
