= 1995 Spanish local elections in the Community of Madrid =

This article presents the results breakdown of the local elections held in the Community of Madrid on 28 May 1995. The following tables show detailed results in the autonomous community's most populous municipalities, sorted alphabetically.

== City control ==
The following table lists party control in the most populous municipalities, including provincial capitals (highlighted in bold). Gains for a party are highlighted in that party's colour.

Municipality	Population	Previous control	New control
Alcalá de Henares	166,250	Spanish Socialist Workers' Party (PSOE)	People's Party (PP)
Alcobendas	83,990	Spanish Socialist Workers' Party (PSOE)	Spanish Socialist Workers' Party (PSOE)
Alcorcón	142,165	Spanish Socialist Workers' Party (PSOE)	Spanish Socialist Workers' Party (PSOE)
Coslada	79,240	United Left (IU)	United Left (IU) (PIC in 1999)
Fuenlabrada	158,212	Spanish Socialist Workers' Party (PSOE)	Spanish Socialist Workers' Party (PSOE)
Getafe	144,368	Spanish Socialist Workers' Party (PSOE)	Spanish Socialist Workers' Party (PSOE)
Leganés	178,162	Spanish Socialist Workers' Party (PSOE)	Spanish Socialist Workers' Party (PSOE)
**Madrid**	3,041,101	People's Party (PP)	People's Party (PP)
Móstoles	199,141	Spanish Socialist Workers' Party (PSOE)	Spanish Socialist Workers' Party (PSOE)
Parla	72,145	Spanish Socialist Workers' Party (PSOE)	Spanish Socialist Workers' Party (PSOE)
Torrejón de Ardoz	87,219	Spanish Socialist Workers' Party (PSOE)	People's Party (PP) (PSOE in 1997)

== Municipalities ==
=== Alcalá de Henares ===
Population: 166,250

← Summary of the 28 May 1995 City Council of Alcalá de Henares election results →
Parties and alliances	Popular vote			Seats	
Parties and alliances	Votes	%	±pp	Total	+/−
People's Party (PP)	31,786	38.50	+12.95	11	+3
Spanish Socialist Workers' Party (PSOE)	24,806	30.05	−10.24	9	−4
United Left (IU)	20,036	24.27	+5.82	7	+1
Green Cooperation (CVerde)	1,398	1.69	New	0	±0
Democratic and Social Centre (CDS)	1,254	1.52	−3.25	0	±0
Local Action (AL)	496	0.60	New	0	±0
Platform of Independents of Spain (PIE)	304	0.37	New	0	±0
United Extremadura (EU)	219	0.27	New	0	±0
Complutense Independent Alternative (ALIC)	125	0.15	New	0	±0
C+C Political Association (C+C)	109	0.13	New	0	±0
Madrilenian Independent Regional Party (PRIM)	82	0.10	−0.92	0	±0
Blank ballots	1,945	2.36	+0.66		
Total	82,560			27	±0
Valid votes	82,560	99.51	+0.07		
Invalid votes	408	0.49	−0.07		
Votes cast / turnout	82,968	65.91	+13.26		
Abstentions	42,918	34.09	−13.26		
Registered voters	125,886				

=== Alcobendas ===
Population: 83,990

← Summary of the 28 May 1995 City Council of Alcobendas election results →
Parties and alliances	Popular vote			Seats	
Parties and alliances	Votes	%	±pp	Total	+/−
Spanish Socialist Workers' Party (PSOE)	20,128	44.85	−9.18	12	−3
People's Party (PP)	18,395	40.99	+10.05	11	+3
United Left (IU)	4,618	10.29	+2.60	2	±0
The Greens–Green Group (LV–GV)	607	1.35	New	0	±0
Platform of Independents of Spain (PIE)	520	1.16	New	0	±0
Blank ballots	614	1.37	+0.29		
Total	44,882			25	±0
Valid votes	44,882	99.61	+0.07		
Invalid votes	176	0.39	−0.07		
Votes cast / turnout	45,058	70.41	+11.58		
Abstentions	18,936	29.59	−11.58		
Registered voters	63,994				

=== Alcorcón ===
Population: 142,165

← Summary of the 28 May 1995 City Council of Alcorcón election results →
Parties and alliances	Popular vote			Seats	
Parties and alliances	Votes	%	±pp	Total	+/−
People's Party (PP)	36,089	45.16	+14.46	13	+4
Spanish Socialist Workers' Party (PSOE)	25,745	32.22	−10.10	9	−4
United Left (IU)	15,003	18.78	+5.59	5	+1
The Greens–Green Group (LV–GV)	1,219	1.53	New	0	±0
Humanist Neighbourhood Coalition (CVH)	263	0.33	New	0	±0
Communist Party of the Peoples of Spain (PCPE)	209	0.26	New	0	±0
Democratic and Social Centre (CDS)	n/a	n/a	−5.62	0	−1
Blank ballots	1,377	1.72	+0.31		
Total	79,905			27	±0
Valid votes	79,905	99.56	+0.06		
Invalid votes	352	0.44	−0.06		
Votes cast / turnout	80,257	65.51	+10.40		
Abstentions	42,256	34.49	−10.40		
Registered voters	122,513				

=== Coslada ===
Population: 79,240

← Summary of the 28 May 1995 City Council of Coslada election results →
Parties and alliances	Popular vote			Seats	
Parties and alliances	Votes	%	±pp	Total	+/−
United Left (IU)	18,891	52.24	+0.60	14	±0
People's Party (PP)	8,691	24.03	+11.51	6	+3
Spanish Socialist Workers' Party (PSOE)	6,833	18.89	−10.95	5	−3
Independent Union of Coslada (UNICOS)	976	2.70	New	0	±0
Madrilenian Independent Regional Party (PRIM)	249	0.69	−0.13	0	±0
Blank ballots	525	1.45	+0.21		
Total	36,165			25	±0
Valid votes	36,165	99.57	+0.11		
Invalid votes	155	0.43	−0.11		
Votes cast / turnout	36,320	66.54	+12.40		
Abstentions	18,263	33.46	−12.40		
Registered voters	54,583				

=== Fuenlabrada ===
Population: 158,212

← Summary of the 28 May 1995 City Council of Fuenlabrada election results →
Parties and alliances	Popular vote			Seats	
Parties and alliances	Votes	%	±pp	Total	+/−
Spanish Socialist Workers' Party (PSOE)	34,057	48.78	−9.43	14	−4
People's Party (PP)	20,899	29.94	+12.36	8	+3
United Left (IU)	12,607	18.06	+2.56	5	+1
The Greens–Green Group (LV–GV)	694	0.99	New	0	±0
United Extremadura (EU)	265	0.38	New	0	±0
Platform of Independents of Spain (PIE)	257	0.37	New	0	±0
Independent Group of Fuenlabrada (GIF)	202	0.29	New	0	±0
Madrilenian Independent Regional Party (PRIM)	103	0.15	−0.53	0	±0
Humanist Platform (PH)	72	0.10	New	0	±0
Blank ballots	658	0.94	+0.18		
Total	69,814			27	±0
Valid votes	69,814	99.72	+0.06		
Invalid votes	199	0.28	−0.06		
Votes cast / turnout	70,013	65.55	+16.40		
Abstentions	36,803	34.45	−16.40		
Registered voters	106,816				

=== Getafe ===
Population: 144,368

← Summary of the 28 May 1995 City Council of Getafe election results →
Parties and alliances	Popular vote			Seats	
Parties and alliances	Votes	%	±pp	Total	+/−
Spanish Socialist Workers' Party (PSOE)	31,483	38.28	−11.77	11	−4
People's Party (PP)	25,721	31.27	+11.14	9	+3
United Left (IU)	21,434	26.06	+6.23	7	+1
The Greens–Green Group (LV–GV)	949	1.15	New	0	±0
Democratic and Social Centre (CDS)	908	1.10	−3.39	0	±0
Citizen Group for Education and Democracy (ACED)	234	0.28	New	0	±0
Independent Platform of Getafe (PIG)	208	0.25	New	0	±0
Platform of Independents of Spain (PIE)	147	0.18	New	0	±0
Madrilenian Independent Regional Party (PRIM)	94	0.11	−0.09	0	±0
Blank ballots	1,064	1.29	+0.30		
Total	82,242			27	±0
Valid votes	82,242	99.54	+0.17		
Invalid votes	378	0.46	−0.17		
Votes cast / turnout	82,620	72.37	+14.06		
Abstentions	31,538	27.63	−14.06		
Registered voters	114,158				

=== Leganés ===
Population: 178,162

← Summary of the 28 May 1995 City Council of Leganés election results →
Parties and alliances	Popular vote			Seats	
Parties and alliances	Votes	%	±pp	Total	+/−
Spanish Socialist Workers' Party (PSOE)	33,782	35.73	−11.97	10	−4
People's Party (PP)	31,793	33.63	+13.58	10	+4
United Left (IU)	24,592	26.01	+5.67	7	+1
The Greens–Green Group (LV–GV)	1,780	1.88	New	0	±0
Platform of Independents of Spain (PIE)	636	0.67	New	0	±0
Communist Party of the Peoples of Spain (PCPE)	267	0.28	New	0	±0
Humanist Platform (PH)	174	0.18	New	0	±0
Democratic and Social Centre (CDS)	n/a	n/a	−5.04	0	−1
Blank ballots	1,519	1.61	+0.24		
Total	94,543			27	±0
Valid votes	94,543	99.42	−0.05		
Invalid votes	553	0.58	+0.05		
Votes cast / turnout	95,096	68.79	+14.55		
Abstentions	43,141	31.21	−14.55		
Registered voters	138,237				

=== Madrid ===
Population: 3,041,101

=== Móstoles ===
Population: 199,141

← Summary of the 28 May 1995 City Council of Móstoles election results →
Parties and alliances	Popular vote			Seats	
Parties and alliances	Votes	%	±pp	Total	+/−
People's Party (PP)	40,485	42.59	+10.67	13	+3
Spanish Socialist Workers' Party (PSOE)	24,372	25.64	−10.95	8	−3
United Left (IU)	20,941	22.03	+4.55	6	+1
Independent Mostolenian Union (UNMI)	3,011	3.17	New	0	±0
Democratic and Social Centre (CDS)	1,355	1.43	−3.89	0	−1
The Greens–Green Group (LV–GV)	1,347	1.42	New	0	±0
Móstoles Citizen Initiatives (MIC)	1,125	1.18	New	0	±0
Independent Regional Unity (URI)	461	0.48	New	0	±0
Platform of Independents of Spain (PIE)	253	0.27	New	0	±0
Madrilenian Independent Regional Party (PRIM)	121	0.13	−0.23	0	±0
Blank ballots	1,588	1.67	+0.37		
Total	95,059			27	±0
Valid votes	95,059	99.56	+0.04		
Invalid votes	421	0.44	−0.04		
Votes cast / turnout	95,480	65.92	+15.53		
Abstentions	49,359	34.08	−15.53		
Registered voters	144,839				

=== Parla ===
Population: 72,145

← Summary of the 28 May 1995 City Council of Parla election results →
Parties and alliances	Popular vote			Seats	
Parties and alliances	Votes	%	±pp	Total	+/−
Spanish Socialist Workers' Party (PSOE)	11,548	35.61	−7.29	9	−3
United Left (IU)	10,684	32.95	+2.47	9	+1
People's Party (PP)	8,994	27.74	+9.97	7	+2
Independent Regional Unity (URI)	475	1.46	New	0	±0
Platform of Independents of Spain (PIE)	346	1.07	New	0	±0
Blank ballots	380	1.17	+0.12		
Total	32,427			25	±0
Valid votes	32,427	99.61	+0.09		
Invalid votes	126	0.39	−0.09		
Votes cast / turnout	32,553	63.24	+13.72		
Abstentions	18,921	36.76	−13.72		
Registered voters	51,474				

=== Torrejón de Ardoz ===
Population: 87,219

← Summary of the 28 May 1995 City Council of Torrejón de Ardoz election results →
Parties and alliances	Popular vote			Seats	
Parties and alliances	Votes	%	±pp	Total	+/−
People's Party (PP)	15,676	38.32	+11.54	11	+3
Spanish Socialist Workers' Party (PSOE)	9,759	23.85	−8.13	7	−2
United Left (IU)	8,447	20.65	+1.81	6	+1
Citizen Unity (UC)	2,532	6.19	New	1	+1
Independent Group of Torrejón (GIT)	1,930	4.72	−6.07	0	−3
Renewal Action (AR)	809	1.98	New	0	±0
Democratic and Social Centre (CDS)	511	1.25	−3.54	0	±0
United Extremadura (EU)	246	0.60	New	0	±0
Madrilenian Independent Regional Party (PRIM)	101	0.25	−0.55	0	±0
Spanish Phalanx of the CNSO (FE–JONS)	85	0.21	−0.25	0	±0
Blank ballots	817	2.00	+0.60		
Total	40,913			25	±0
Valid votes	40,913	99.58	+0.19		
Invalid votes	171	0.42	−0.19		
Votes cast / turnout	41,084	64.72	+13.58		
Abstentions	22,395	35.28	−13.58		
Registered voters	63,479				

== See also ==
- 1995 Madrilenian regional election
