= Municipal elections in Madrid =

Elections in the municipal council of Madrid, Spain.

== May 2003 ==
| Party | Votes | % | Seats |
|---|---|---|---|
| Partido Popular | 874,264 | 51.30 | 30 |
| Partido Socialista Obrero Español | 625,148 | 36.68 | 21 |
| Izquierda Unida de la Comunidad de Madrid | 123,015 | 7.22 | 4 |
| Los Verdes | 26,448 | 1.55 | 0 |
| Los Verdes de la Comunidad de Madrid | 9,944 | 0.58 | 0 |
| Izquierda Republicana | 3,553 | 0.21 | 0 |
| Familia y Vida | 3,094 | 0.18 | 0 |
| La Falange | 2,174 | 0.13 | 0 |
| Centro Democrático y Social | 2,136 | 0.13 | 0 |
| Falange Española Independiente | 1,113 | 0.07 | 0 |
| Partido Humanista | 1,022 | 0.06 | 0 |
| Partido Regional Independiente Madrileño | 903 | 0.05 | 0 |
| Tierra Comunera-Partido Nacionalista Castellano | 820 | 0.05 | 0 |
| Otra Democracia es Posible | 810 | 0.05 | 0 |
| Partido Democráta Español | 801 | 0.05 | 0 |
| Falange Autentica | 635 | 0.04 | 0 |
| Inmigrantes con Derechos Igualdad y Obligaciones | 479 | 0.03 | 0 |
| Federación Republicana | 478 | 0.03 | 0 |
| Blank votes | 27,304 | 1.60 | |
| Valid votes | 1,704,141 | 99.56 | |
| Invalid votes | 7.472 | 0.44 | |
| Total | | 1,711,613 (68.90 %) | |

== June 1987 ==
Source:
