= 1999 Spanish local elections =

- 13 June 1999 (Note: By-elections were held on 28 November 1999 in those constituencies where results were annulled by a final sentence following an electoral petition, or where elections were not held due to a lack of candidates.)

All 65,201 councillors in 8,104 municipal councils (Note: Including 50 seats in the assemblies of Ceuta and Melilla.) All 1,385 provincial/island seats in 44 provinces (Note: Including: 1,034 seats in 38 provincial deputations; 153 seats in 3 Basque foral deputations; 139 seats in 7 Canarian island cabildos; 59 seats in 3 Balearic island councils.)
- Registered: 33,585,957 ▲5.1%
- Turnout: 21,491,984 (64.0%) ▼5.9 pp
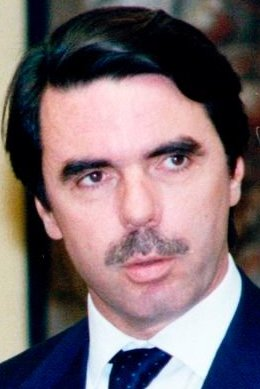

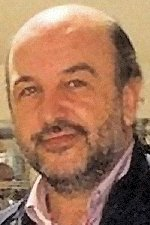

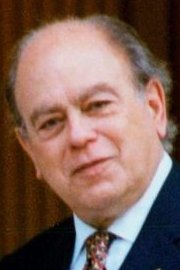

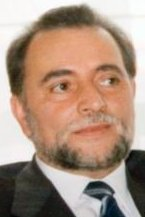

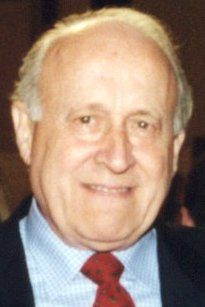

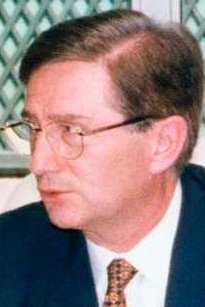
	First party	Second party	Third party
Leader	José María Aznar	Joaquín Almunia	Jordi Pujol
Party	PP	PSOE–p	CiU
Leader since	4 September 1989	21 June 1997	19 September 1978
Last election	24,772 c., 35.3% 553 p.	21,160 c., 30.8% (Note: Results for PSOE in the 1995 elections, not including Ibiza and Formentera.); 475 p.	4,265 c., 4.4% 64 p.
Seats won	24,623 c. 547 p.	21,917 c. 509 p.	4,089 c. 57 p.
Seat change	▼149 c. ▼6 p.	▲757 c. ▲34 p.	▼176 c. ▼7 p.
Popular vote	7,334,135	7,296,484	774,074
Percentage	34.4%	34.3%	3.6%
Swing	▼0.9 pp	▲3.5 pp	▼0.8 pp
	Fourth party	Fifth party	Sixth party
Leader	Julio Anguita	Xabier Arzalluz	José María Mur
Party	IU	EAJ/PNV	PAR
Leader since	12 February 1989	18 January 1985	July 1987
Last election	3,101 c., 9.9% (Note: Results for IU in the 1995 elections, not including Ibiza nor IC–EV results in Catalonia.); 75 p.	1,421 c., 2.0% (Note: Results for PNV (1.4%, 1,015 c. and 47 p.) and EA (0.6%, 406 c. and 15 p.) in the 1995 elections.); 62 p.	1,050 c., 0.5% 11 p.
Seats won	2,295 c. 39 p.	1,206 c. 56 p.	925 c. 10 p.
Seat change	▼806 c. ▼36 p.	▼215 c. ▼6 p.	▼125 c. ▼1 p.
Popular vote	1,387,900	411,274	87,493
Percentage	6.5%	1.9%	0.4%
Swing	▼3.4 pp	▼0.1 pp	▼0.1 pp
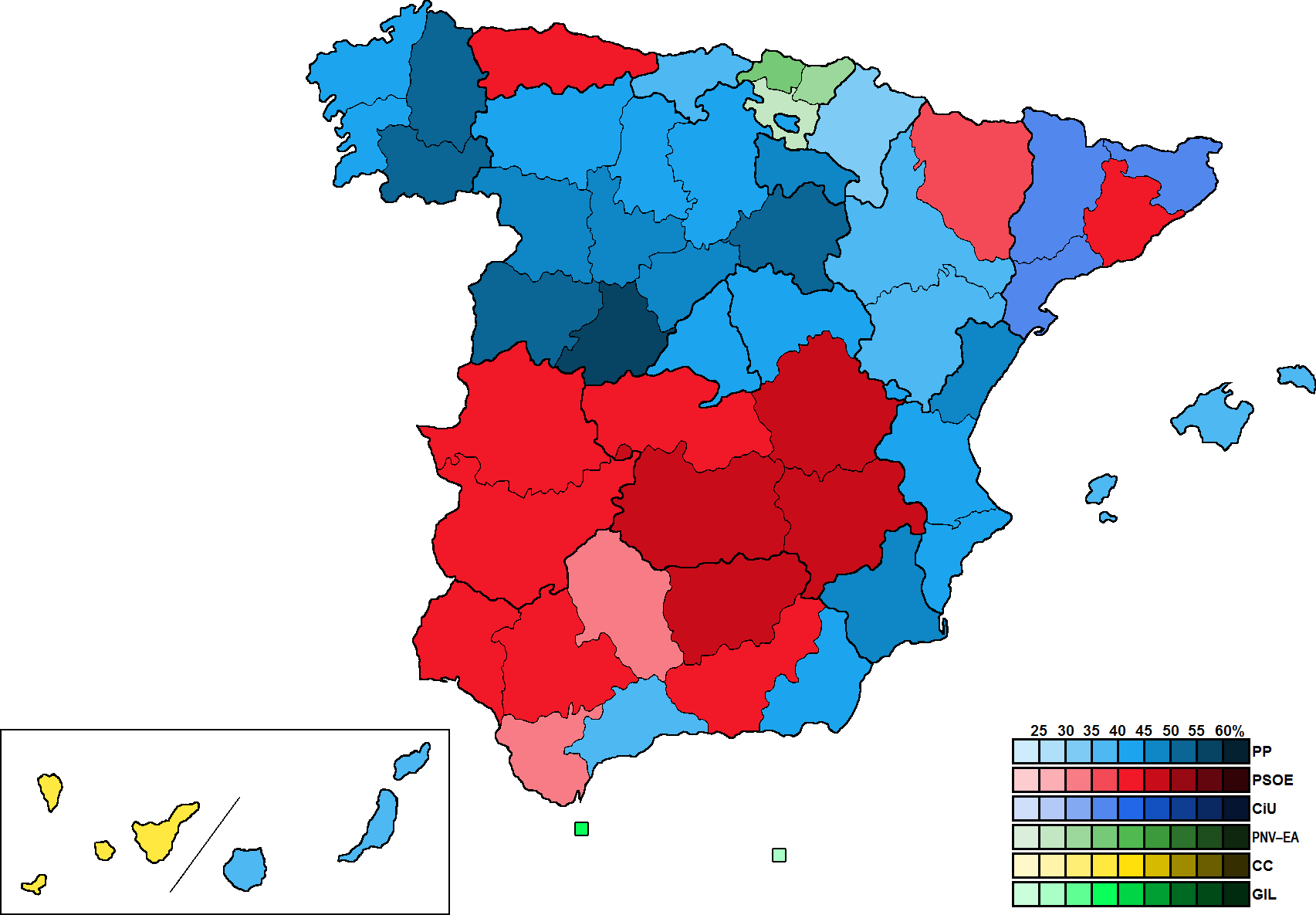
- Provincial results map for municipal elections

Local elections were held in Spain on 13 June 1999 to elect all 65,201 councillors in the 8,104 Spanish municipalities (including 50 seats in the assemblies of the autonomous cities of Ceuta and Melilla), all 1,187 provincial seats in 41 provinces (including 38 indirectly-elected provincial deputations and the three foral deputations in the Basque Country) and 198 seats in ten island councils (seven Canarian and three Balearic ones). They were held concurrently with regional elections in thirteen autonomous communities, as well as the 1999 European Parliament election.

== Overview ==
=== Local government ===
Under the 1978 Constitution, the governance of municipalities in Spain was centered on the figure of city councils (Spanish: ayuntamientos), local corporations with independent legal personality composed of a mayor, a government council and an elected legislative assembly. The mayor was indirectly elected by the local assembly, requiring an absolute majority; otherwise, the candidate from the most-voted party automatically became mayor (ties were resolved by drawing lots). The concejo abierto system (English: open council), under which voters directly elected the local mayor by plurality voting, was reserved for municipalities under 100 inhabitants and some minor local entities.

Provincial deputations were the governing bodies of provinces in Spain—except for single-province autonomous communities—having an administration role of municipal activities and composed of a provincial president, an administrative body, and a plenary. For insular provinces, such as the Balearic and Canary Islands, deputations were replaced by island councils in each of the islands or group of islands. For Gran Canaria, Tenerife, Fuerteventura, La Gomera, El Hierro, Lanzarote and La Palma, this figure was referred to in Spanish as cabildo insular, whereas for Mallorca, Menorca and Ibiza–Formentera, its name was consejo insular (Catalan: consell insular). (Note: For the Balearic Islands, regional lawmakers served as island councillors.) The three Basque provinces had foral deputations instead (called General Assemblies, or Juntas Generales).

=== Date ===
The term of local assemblies in Spain expired four years after the date of their previous election, with election day being fixed for the fourth Sunday of May every four years, but a 1998 amendment allowed for local elections held in May 1995 to be held concurrently with European Parliament elections, provided that they were scheduled for within a four month-timespan. The election decree was required to be issued no later than 54 days before the scheduled election date and published on the following day in the Official State Gazette (BOE). The previous local elections were held on 28 May 1995, setting the date for election day concurrently with that year's European Parliament election on 13 June 1999.

Local assemblies could not be dissolved before the expiration of their term, except in cases of mismanagement that seriously harmed the public interest and implied a breach of constitutional obligations, in which case the Council of Ministers could—optionally—decide to call a by-election.

Elections to the assemblies of local entities were officially called on 20 April 1999 with the publication of the corresponding decree in the BOE, setting election day for 13 June. Subsequent by-elections were called on 4 October, for 28 November.

=== Electoral system ===
Voting for local assemblies and Canarian island councils was based on universal suffrage, comprising all Spanish nationals over 18 years of age, registered and residing in the municipality or council and with full political rights (provided that they had not been deprived of the right to vote by a final sentence, nor were legally incapacitated), as well as resident non-national European citizens, and those whose country of origin allowed reciprocal voting by virtue of a treaty.

Local councillors were elected using the D'Hondt method and closed-list proportional voting, with a five percent-threshold of valid votes (including blank ballots) in each constituency. Each municipality or council was a multi-member constituency, with a number of seats based on the following scale:

Population	Councillors		
Population	Municipalities	Canary Islands	Balearic Islands
<250	5	No island below 5,000 inhabitants	Fixed number: Ibiza–Formentera: 13; Menorca: 13; Mallorca: 33
251–1,000	7	No island below 5,000 inhabitants	Fixed number: Ibiza–Formentera: 13; Menorca: 13; Mallorca: 33
1,001–2,000	9	No island below 5,000 inhabitants	Fixed number: Ibiza–Formentera: 13; Menorca: 13; Mallorca: 33
2,001–5,000	11	No island below 5,000 inhabitants	Fixed number: Ibiza–Formentera: 13; Menorca: 13; Mallorca: 33
5,001–10,000	13	11	Fixed number: Ibiza–Formentera: 13; Menorca: 13; Mallorca: 33
10,001–20,000	17	13	Fixed number: Ibiza–Formentera: 13; Menorca: 13; Mallorca: 33
20,001–50,000	21	17	Fixed number: Ibiza–Formentera: 13; Menorca: 13; Mallorca: 33
50,001–100,000	25	21	Fixed number: Ibiza–Formentera: 13; Menorca: 13; Mallorca: 33
>100,001	+1 per each 100,000 inhabitants or fraction +1 if total is an even number		Fixed number: Ibiza–Formentera: 13; Menorca: 13; Mallorca: 33

Councillors in municipalities between 100 and 250 inhabitants were elected using open-list partial block voting, with voters choosing up to four candidates.

Most provincial deputations were indirectly elected by applying the D'Hondt method and a three percent-threshold of valid votes to municipal results—excluding candidacies not electing any councillor—in each judicial district. Seats were allocated to provincial deputations based on the following scale (with each judicial district being assigned an initial minimum of one seat and a maximum of three-fifths of the total number of provincial seats, with the remaining ones distributed in proportion to population):

Population	Seats
<500,000	25
500,001–1,000,000	27
1,000,001–3,500,000	31
>3,500,001	51

The General Assemblies of Álava, Biscay and Gipuzkoa were directly elected by voters under their own, specific electoral regulations.

The law did not provide for by-elections to fill vacant seats; instead, any vacancies arising after the proclamation of candidates and during the legislative term were filled by the next candidates on the party lists or, when required, by designated substitutes.

== Parties and candidates ==
The electoral law allowed for parties and federations registered in the interior ministry, alliances and groupings of electors to present lists of candidates. Parties and federations intending to form an alliance were required to inform the relevant electoral commission within 10 days of the election call, whereas groupings of electors needed to secure the signature of a determined amount of the electors registered in the municipality for which they sought election, disallowing electors from signing for more than one list:

- At least one percent of the electors in municipalities with a population below 5,000 inhabitants, provided that the number of signers was more than double that of councillors at stake.
- At least 100 signatures in municipalities with a population between 5,001 and 10,000.
- At least 500 signatures in municipalities with a population between 10,001 and 50,000.
- At least 1,500 signatures in municipalities with a population between 50,001 and 150,000.
- At least 3,000 signatures in municipalities with a population between 150,001 and 300,000.
- At least 5,000 signatures in municipalities with a population between 300,001 and 1,000,000.
- At least 8,000 signatures in municipalities with a population over 1,000,001.

== Results ==
=== Municipal ===
==== Overall ====
← Summary of the 13 June 1999 Spanish municipal election results →
Parties and alliances	Popular vote			Councillors	
Parties and alliances	Votes	%	±pp	Total	+/−
People's Party (PP)	7,334,135	34.44	−0.83	**24,623**	−149
People's Party (PP)	7,243,243	34.01	−0.92	24,296	−183
Navarrese People's Union (UPN)	90,892	0.43	+0.08	327	+34
Spanish Socialist Workers' Party–Progressives (PSOE–p)^{1}	7,296,484	34.26	+3.46	**21,917**	+757
United Left (IU)^{1} ^{2}	1,387,900	6.52	−3.41	**2,295**	−806
Convergence and Union (CiU)	774,074	3.63	−0.77	**4,089**	−176
Basque Nationalist Party–Basque Solidarity (PNV–EA)^{3}	411,274	1.93	−0.08	**1,206**	−215
Andalusian Party (PA)^{4}	355,684	1.67	+0.11	**544**	+120
Galician Nationalist Bloc (BNG)	290,187	1.36	+0.42	**586**	+158
Basque Citizens (EH)^{5}	272,446	1.28	+0.45	**890**	+269
Canarian Coalition (CC)	268,846	1.26	+0.14	**434**	+5
Canarian Coalition (CC)^{6}	267,773	1.26	+0.20	432	+30
Nationalist Canarian Centre (CCN)	542	0.00	−0.05	1	−18
Independents of Gran Canaria (IGC)	531	0.00	−0.01	1	−7
Initiative for Catalonia–Greens–Agreement for Municipal Progress (IC–V–EPM)^{7}	227,045	1.07	−0.67	**284**	−105
Republican Left of Catalonia–The Greens–Municipal Agreement (ERC–EV–AM)^{1}	225,576	1.06	+0.14	**677**	+152
Valencian Nationalist Bloc–The Greens (BNV–EV)^{8}	113,747	0.53	+0.15	**234**	+66
Valencian Union (UV)	108,639	0.51	−0.08	**229**	+14
Liberal Independent Group (GIL)	87,743	0.41	+0.25	**93**	+50
Aragonese Party (PAR)	87,493	0.41	−0.12	**925**	−125
The Greens–Andalusian Left (LV–IA)^{1}	65,564	0.31	+0.26	**14**	+14
Centrist Union–Democratic and Social Centre (UC–CDS)	62,964	0.30	−0.07	**281**	+20
Aragonese Union (CHA)	54,614	0.26	+0.14	**80**	+41
Regionalist Party of Cantabria (PRC)	49,898	0.23	+0.08	**217**	+129
PSM–Nationalist Agreement (PSM–EN)	41,181	0.19	+0.01	**112**	+15
Socialist Party of Mallorca–Nationalist Agreement (PSM–EN)	38,675	0.18	+0.01	105	+14
Socialist Party of Menorca–Nationalist Agreement (PSM–EN)	2,506	0.01	±0.00	7	+1
Leonese People's Union (UPL)	39,321	0.18	+0.02	**167**	+29
Asturian Renewal Union (URAS)	36,036	0.17	New	**83**	+83
Democratic Party of the New Left (PDNI)	29,300	0.14	New	**67**	+67
Majorcan Union (UM)	24,501	0.12	+0.04	**68**	+24
Spanish Democratic Party (PADE)	23,865	0.11	New	**32**	+32
Federation of Independents of Catalonia (FIC)	22,597	0.11	+0.02	**180**	+3
Canarian Nationalist Federation (FNC)	22,363	0.11	+0.05	**40**	−2
Canarian Nationalist Party (PNC)	9,989	0.05	+0.05	2	+2
Lanzarote Independents Party (PIL)	9,538	0.04	−0.01	29	−2
Independents of Fuerteventura (IF)	2,836	0.01	±0.00	9	−2
Galician Democracy (DG)	18,085	0.08	New	**36**	+36
Commoners' Land–Castilian Nationalist Party (TC–PNC)	16,782	0.08	+0.06	**45**	+22
Progressive Pact+Coalition of Progressive Organizations (Pacte+COP)	16,524	0.08	+0.02	**45**	+9
Progressive Pact (Pacte)^{9}	14,988	0.07	+0.01	37	+6
Coalition of Progressive Organizations (COP)^{10}	1,536	0.01	+0.01	8	+3
Asturianist Party (PAS)	16,187	0.08	+0.02	**12**	+6
Basque Citizen Initiative (ICV/EHE)	15,111	0.07	−0.07	**2**	−3
Convergence of Democrats of Navarre (CDN)	14,573	0.07	−0.04	**25**	−17
Humanist Party (PH)	13,764	0.06	+0.04	0	±0
Party of Gran Canaria (PGC)	13,150	0.06	±0.00	**2**	±0
Regionalist Unity of Castile and León (URCL)	13,041	0.06	+0.01	**124**	+26
Party for Independence (PI)	12,820	0.06	New	**9**	+9
Portuese Independents (IP)	11,424	0.05	−0.02	**10**	−6
Extremaduran Coalition (CREx–PREx)	10,548	0.05	−0.08	**50**	−89
Galician Left–The Greens (EdeG–OV)	10,146	0.05	New	**10**	+10
Independent Initiative (II)	10,122	0.05	New	**22**	+22
Platform of Independents of Spain (PIE)	9,683	0.05	−0.31	**35**	−171
Independent Burgalese Popular Action (APBI)	9,676	0.05	New	**3**	+3
Alavese Unity (UA)	9,675	0.05	−0.05	**9**	−28
Riojan Party (PR)	9,669	0.05	±0.00	**58**	−45
Independent Sorian Alternative (ALSI)	2,671	0.01	±0.00	**4**	+2
Independent Herrenian Group (AHI)	2,345	0.01	±0.00	**9**	+1
Others (lists at <0.05% not securing any provincial or island seat)	932,140	4.38	—	**4,324**	−925
Blank ballots	415,401	1.95	+0.49		
**Total**	**21,297,014**	**100.00**		**65,201**	**−668**
Valid votes	21,297,014	99.09	−0.23		
Invalid votes	194,970	0.91	+0.23		
**Votes cast / turnout**	**21,491,984**	**63.99**	**−5.88**		
Abstentions	12,093,973	36.01	+5.88		
**Registered voters**	**33,585,957**				
Sources
Footnotes: ^{1} Spanish Socialist Workers' Party, United Left, Republican Left of Catalonia and The Greens do not include results in Ibiza and Formentera.; ^{2} United Left does not include Initiative for Catalonia results in Catalonia.; ^{3} Basque Nationalist Party–Basque Solidarity results are compared to the combined totals of Basque Nationalist Party and Basque Solidarity in the 1995 elections.; ^{4} Andalusian Party results are compared to the combined totals of Andalusian Party and Andalusian Progress Party in the 1995 elections.; ^{5} Basque Citizens results are compared to Popular Unity totals in the 1995 elections.; ^{6} Canarian Coalition results are compared to the combined totals of Canarian Coalition and Canarian Initiative in the 1995 elections.; ^{7} Initiative for Catalonia–Greens results are compared to Initiative for Catalonia totals in the 1995 elections, only in Catalonia.; ^{8} Valencian Nationalist Bloc–The Greens results are compared to Valencian People's Union–Nationalist Bloc totals in the 1995 elections.; ^{9} Progressive Pact results are compared to the combined totals of Spanish Socialist Workers' Party, The Greens, United Left, Republican Left of Catalonia and Nationalist and Ecologist Agreement in Ibiza in the 1995 elections.; ^{10} Coalition of Progressive Organizations results are compared to the combined totals of Spanish Socialist Workers' Party and United Left in Formentera in the 1995 elections.

Popular vote
PP	34.44%
PSOE–p	34.26%
IU	6.52%
CiU	3.63%
PNV–EA	1.93%
PA	1.67%
BNG	1.36%
EH	1.28%
CC	1.26%
IC–V–EPM	1.07%
ERC–EV–AM	1.06%
BNV–EV	0.53%
UV	0.51%
Others	8.53%
Blank ballots	1.95%

==== City control ====
The following table lists party control in provincial capitals (highlighted in bold), as well as in municipalities above 75,000. Gains for a party are highlighted in that party's colour.

Municipality	Population	Previous control	New control
**A Coruña**	243,134	Spanish Socialist Workers' Party (PSOE)	Spanish Socialist Workers' Party (PSOE)
**Albacete**	145,454	People's Party (PP)	Spanish Socialist Workers' Party (PSOE)
Alcalá de Henares	163,831	People's Party (PP)	Spanish Socialist Workers' Party (PSOE)
Alcobendas	86,146	Spanish Socialist Workers' Party (PSOE)	Spanish Socialist Workers' Party (PSOE)
Alcorcón	143,970	Spanish Socialist Workers' Party (PSOE)	People's Party (PP)
Algeciras	101,972	Andalusian Party (PA)	Andalusian Party (PA)
**Alicante**	272,432	People's Party (PP)	People's Party (PP)
**Almería**	168,025	People's Party (PP)	Spanish Socialist Workers' Party (PSOE)
**Ávila**	47,650	People's Party (PP)	People's Party (PP)
Avilés	84,835	People's Party (PP)	Spanish Socialist Workers' Party (PSOE)
**Badajoz**	134,710	People's Party (PP)	People's Party (PP)
Badalona	209,606	Socialists' Party of Catalonia (PSC–PSOE)	Socialists' Party of Catalonia (PSC–PSOE)
Barakaldo	98,649	Spanish Socialist Workers' Party (PSOE)	Spanish Socialist Workers' Party (PSOE)
**Barcelona**	1,505,581	Socialists' Party of Catalonia (PSC–PSOE)	Socialists' Party of Catalonia (PSC–PSOE)
**Bilbao**	358,467	Basque Nationalist Party–Basque Solidarity (PNV–EA)	Basque Nationalist Party–Basque Solidarity (PNV–EA)
**Burgos**	161,984	People's Party (PP)	Spanish Socialist Workers' Party (PSOE)
**Cáceres**	78,614	People's Party (PP)	People's Party (PP)
**Cádiz**	143,129	People's Party (PP)	People's Party (PP)
Cartagena	175,628	People's Party (PP)	People's Party (PP)
**Castellón de la Plana**	137,741	People's Party (PP)	People's Party (PP)
**Ciudad Real**	61,138	People's Party (PP)	People's Party (PP)
**Córdoba**	309,961	People's Party (PP)	United Left (IU)
Cornellà de Llobregat	80,329	Socialists' Party of Catalonia (PSC–PSOE)	Socialists' Party of Catalonia (PSC–PSOE)
Coslada	73,732 (Note: Reached 75,000 in 1992–1996, and again from 1999.)	United Left (IU)	Spanish Socialist Workers' Party (PSOE)
**Cuenca**	44,558	People's Party (PP)	Spanish Socialist Workers' Party (PSOE)
**Donostia-San Sebastián**	178,229	Spanish Socialist Workers' Party (PSOE)	Spanish Socialist Workers' Party (PSOE)
Dos Hermanas	92,506	Spanish Socialist Workers' Party (PSOE)	Spanish Socialist Workers' Party (PSOE)
Elche	191,713	Spanish Socialist Workers' Party (PSOE)	Spanish Socialist Workers' Party (PSOE)
Ferrol	82,548	People's Party (PP)	Galician Nationalist Bloc (BNG)
Fuenlabrada	167,458	Spanish Socialist Workers' Party (PSOE)	Spanish Socialist Workers' Party (PSOE)
Getafe	143,629	Spanish Socialist Workers' Party (PSOE)	Spanish Socialist Workers' Party (PSOE)
Getxo	82,974	Basque Nationalist Party–Basque Solidarity (PNV–EA)	Basque Nationalist Party–Basque Solidarity (PNV–EA)
Gijón	265,491	Spanish Socialist Workers' Party (PSOE)	Spanish Socialist Workers' Party (PSOE)
**Girona**	71,858	Socialists' Party of Catalonia (PSC–PSOE)	Socialists' Party of Catalonia (PSC–PSOE)
**Granada**	241,471	People's Party (PP)	Spanish Socialist Workers' Party (PSOE)
**Guadalajara**	64,439	People's Party (PP)	People's Party (PP)
**Huelva**	139,991	People's Party (PP)	People's Party (PP)
**Huesca**	45,485	People's Party (PP)	Spanish Socialist Workers' Party (PSOE)
**Jaén**	107,184	People's Party (PP)	People's Party (PP)
Jerez de la Frontera	181,602	Andalusian Party (PA)	Andalusian Party (PA)
L'Hospitalet de Llobregat	248,521	Socialists' Party of Catalonia (PSC–PSOE)	Socialists' Party of Catalonia (PSC–PSOE)
**Las Palmas de Gran Canaria**	352,641	People's Party (PP)	People's Party (PP)
Leganés	173,163	Spanish Socialist Workers' Party (PSOE)	Spanish Socialist Workers' Party (PSOE)
**León**	139,809	People's Party (PP)	People's Party (PP)
**Lleida**	112,207	Socialists' Party of Catalonia (PSC–PSOE)	Socialists' Party of Catalonia (PSC–PSOE)
**Logroño**	125,617	People's Party (PP)	People's Party (PP)
**Lugo**	86,620	People's Party (PP)	Spanish Socialist Workers' Party (PSOE)
**Madrid**	2,881,506	People's Party (PP)	People's Party (PP)
**Málaga**	528,079	People's Party (PP)	People's Party (PP)
Marbella	98,377	Liberal Independent Group (GIL)	Liberal Independent Group (GIL)
Mataró	103,265	Socialists' Party of Catalonia (PSC–PSOE)	Socialists' Party of Catalonia (PSC–PSOE)
Móstoles	195,311	Spanish Socialist Workers' Party (PSOE)	Spanish Socialist Workers' Party (PSOE)
**Murcia**	349,040	People's Party (PP)	People's Party (PP)
**Ourense**	107,965	People's Party (PP)	People's Party (PP)
**Oviedo**	199,549	People's Party (PP)	People's Party (PP)
**Palencia**	79,745	People's Party (PP)	Spanish Socialist Workers' Party (PSOE)
**Palma de Mallorca**	319,181	People's Party (PP)	People's Party (PP)
**Pamplona**	179,145	Convergence of Democrats of Navarre (CDN)	Navarrese People's Union (UPN)
**Pontevedra**	73,871	People's Party (PP)	Galician Nationalist Bloc (BNG)
Reus	89,034	Socialists' Party of Catalonia (PSC–PSOE)	Socialists' Party of Catalonia (PSC–PSOE)
Sabadell	184,859	Initiative for Catalonia (IC)	Socialists' Party of Catalonia (PSC–PSOE)
**Salamanca**	158,457	People's Party (PP)	People's Party (PP)
San Cristóbal de La Laguna	127,945	Canarian Coalition (CC)	Canarian Coalition (CC)
San Fernando	84,014	Andalusian Party (PA)	Andalusian Party (PA)
Sant Boi de Llobregat	78,632	Socialists' Party of Catalonia (PSC–PSOE)	Socialists' Party of Catalonia (PSC–PSOE)
Santa Coloma de Gramenet	120,958	Socialists' Party of Catalonia (PSC–PSOE)	Socialists' Party of Catalonia (PSC–PSOE)
**Santa Cruz de Tenerife**	211,930	Canarian Coalition (CC)	Canarian Coalition (CC)
**Santander**	184,165	People's Party (PP)	People's Party (PP)
Santiago de Compostela	93,584	Spanish Socialist Workers' Party (PSOE)	Spanish Socialist Workers' Party (PSOE)
**Segovia**	54,012	People's Party (PP)	Centrist Unity–Democratic and Social Centre (UC–CDS)
**Seville**	701,927	People's Party (PP)	Spanish Socialist Workers' Party (PSOE)
**Soria**	33,882	People's Party (PP)	Spanish Socialist Workers' Party (PSOE)
Talavera de la Reina	72,208 (Note: Reached 75,000 in 1994–1995, and again from 2001.)	People's Party (PP)	Spanish Socialist Workers' Party (PSOE)
**Tarragona**	112,795	Convergence and Union (CiU)	Convergence and Union (CiU)
Telde	83,733	Canarian Coalition (CC)	Canarian Coalition (CC)
Terrassa	165,654	Socialists' Party of Catalonia (PSC–PSOE)	Socialists' Party of Catalonia (PSC–PSOE)
**Teruel**	29,320	People's Party (PP)	People's Party (PP)
**Toledo**	66,989	People's Party (PP)	People's Party (PP)
Torrejón de Ardoz	91,186	Spanish Socialist Workers' Party (PSOE)	Spanish Socialist Workers' Party (PSOE)
**Valencia**	739,412	People's Party (PP)	People's Party (PP)
**Valladolid**	319,946	People's Party (PP)	People's Party (PP)
Vigo	283,110	People's Party (PP)	Galician Nationalist Bloc (BNG)
**Vitoria-Gasteiz**	216,527	Basque Nationalist Party–Basque Solidarity (PNV–EA)	People's Party (PP)
**Zamora**	64,421	People's Party (PP)	People's Party (PP)
**Zaragoza**	603,367	People's Party (PP)	People's Party (PP)

==== Autonomous cities ====
The following table lists party control in the autonomous cities. Gains for a party are highlighted in that party's colour.

City	Population	Previous control	New control
Ceuta	72,117	People's Party (PP)	Liberal Independent Group (GIL) (PP in 2001)
Melilla	60,108	Independent Party of Melilla (PIM)	Coalition for Melilla (CpM) (PP in 2000)

=== Provincial and island ===
==== Summary ====
← Summary of the 13 June 1999 Spanish provincial and island election results →
Parties and alliances	Seats				
Parties and alliances	PD	IC	FD	Total	+/−
People's Party (PP)	454	59	34	**547**	−6
Spanish Socialist Workers' Party (PSOE)^{1}	425	55	29	**509**	+34
Convergence and Union (CiU)	57	—	—	**57**	−7
Basque Nationalist Party–Basque Solidarity (PNV–EA)^{2}	—	—	56	**56**	−6
Canarian Coalition (CC)	—	49	—	**49**	+7
United Left (IU)^{3}	33	3	3	**39**	−36
Basque Citizens (EH)^{4}	—	—	29	**29**	+9
Galician Nationalist Bloc (BNG)	15	—	—	**15**	+4
Andalusian Party (PA)^{5}	12	—	—	**12**	+1
Aragonese Party (PAR)	10	—	—	**10**	−1
Canarian Nationalist Federation (FNC)	—	10	—	**10**	−2
Lanzarote Independents Party (PIL)	—	7	—	7	−1
Independents of Fuerteventura (IF)	—	3	—	3	−1
Independent Herrenian Group (AHI)	—	7	—	**7**	+1
Progressive Pact+Coalition of Progressive Organizations (Pacte+COP)	—	7	—	**7**	+2
Progressive Pact (Pacte)^{6}	—	6	—	6	+1
Coalition of Progressive Organizations (COP)	—	1	—	1	+1
Republican Left of Catalonia–The Greens–Municipal Agreement (ERC–EV–AM)	6	—	—	**6**	+4
Liberal Independent Group (GIL)	5	—	—	**5**	+2
PSM–Nationalist Agreement (PSM–EN)	—	5	—	**5**	−1
Socialist Party of Mallorca–Nationalist Agreement (PSM–EN)	—	4	—	4	−1
Socialist Party of Menorca–Nationalist Agreement (PSM–EN)	—	1	—	1	±0
Initiative for Catalonia–Greens (IC–V)^{7}	3	—	—	**3**	−4
Aragonese Union (CHA)	3	—	—	**3**	+3
Leonese People's Union (UPL)	3	—	—	**3**	+1
Majorcan Union (UM)	—	3	—	**3**	+1
Valencian Nationalist Bloc–The Greens (BNV–EV)	2	—	—	**2**	+2
Alavese Unity (UA)	—	—	2	**2**	−7
Valencian Union (UV)	1	—	—	**1**	±0
Centrist Union–Democratic and Social Centre (UC–CDS)	1	0	—	**1**	+1
Commoners' Land–Castilian Nationalist Party (TC–PNC)	1	—	—	**1**	+1
Independent Burgalese Popular Action (APBI)	1	—	—	**1**	+1
Independent Sorian Alternative (ALSI)	1	—	—	**1**	±0
Basque Citizen Initiative (ICV/EHE)	—	—	0	0	−2
Independent Popular Council of Formentera (AIPF)	—	0	—	0	−1
Independent Group of Ávila (AIAV)	n/a	n/a	n/a	0	−1
Independents (INDEP)	1	0	0	**1**	±0
**Total**	**1,034**	**198**	**153**	**1,385**	**±0**
Sources
Footnotes: ^{1} Spanish Socialist Workers' Party does not include results in Ibiza.; ^{2} Basque Nationalist Party–Basque Solidarity results are compared to the combined totals of Basque Nationalist Party and Basque Solidarity in the 1995 elections.; ^{3} United Left does not include Initiative for Catalonia results in Catalonia.; ^{4} Basque Citizens results are compared to Popular Unity totals in the 1995 elections.; ^{5} Andalusian Party results are compared to the combined totals of Andalusian Party and Andalusian Progress Party in the 1995 elections.; ^{6} Progressive Pact results are compared to the combined totals of Spanish Socialist Workers' Party and The Greens in Ibiza in the 1995 election.; ^{7} Initiative for Catalonia–Greens results are compared to Initiative for Catalonia totals in the 1995 elections, only in Catalonia.

==== Indirectly-elected ====
The following table lists party control in the indirectly-elected provincial deputations. Gains for a party are highlighted in that party's colour.

Province	Population	Previous control	New control
A Coruña (Note: Renamed from La Coruña in April 1998.)	1,106,325	People's Party (PP)	People's Party (PP)
Albacete	358,597	People's Party (PP)	Spanish Socialist Workers' Party (PSOE)
Alicante	1,388,933	People's Party (PP)	People's Party (PP)
Almería	505,448	People's Party (PP)	People's Party (PP)
Ávila	167,132	People's Party (PP)	People's Party (PP)
Badajoz	663,803	Spanish Socialist Workers' Party (PSOE)	Spanish Socialist Workers' Party (PSOE)
Barcelona	4,666,271	Socialists' Party of Catalonia (PSC–PSOE)	Socialists' Party of Catalonia (PSC–PSOE)
Burgos	344,306	People's Party (PP)	People's Party (PP)
Cáceres	405,616	Spanish Socialist Workers' Party (PSOE)	Spanish Socialist Workers' Party (PSOE)
Cádiz	1,107,484	Spanish Socialist Workers' Party (PSOE)	Spanish Socialist Workers' Party (PSOE)
Castellón	461,712	People's Party (PP)	People's Party (PP)
Ciudad Real	479,474	People's Party (PP)	Spanish Socialist Workers' Party (PSOE)
Córdoba	767,175	Spanish Socialist Workers' Party (PSOE)	Spanish Socialist Workers' Party (PSOE)
Cuenca	199,086	People's Party (PP)	Spanish Socialist Workers' Party (PSOE)
Girona	543,191	Convergence and Union (CiU)	Convergence and Union (CiU)
Granada	801,177	Spanish Socialist Workers' Party (PSOE)	Spanish Socialist Workers' Party (PSOE)
Guadalajara	159,331	People's Party (PP)	Spanish Socialist Workers' Party (PSOE)
Huelva	453,958	Spanish Socialist Workers' Party (PSOE)	Spanish Socialist Workers' Party (PSOE)
Huesca	204,956	People's Party (PP)	Spanish Socialist Workers' Party (PSOE)
Jaén	645,792	Spanish Socialist Workers' Party (PSOE)	Spanish Socialist Workers' Party (PSOE)
León	506,365	People's Party (PP)	People's Party (PP)
Lleida	357,903	Convergence and Union (CiU)	Convergence and Union (CiU)
Lugo	367,751	People's Party (PP)	People's Party (PP)
Málaga	1,240,580	People's Party (PP)	Spanish Socialist Workers' Party (PSOE)
Ourense (Note: Renamed from Orense in April 1998.)	344,170	People's Party (PP)	People's Party (PP)
Palencia	179,623	People's Party (PP)	People's Party (PP)
Pontevedra	906,298	People's Party (PP)	People's Party (PP)
Salamanca	349,550	People's Party (PP)	People's Party (PP)
Segovia	145,961	People's Party (PP)	People's Party (PP)
Seville	1,714,845	Spanish Socialist Workers' Party (PSOE)	Spanish Socialist Workers' Party (PSOE)
Soria	91,390	People's Party (PP)	People's Party (PP)
Tarragona	580,245	Convergence and Union (CiU)	Convergence and Union (CiU)
Teruel	136,840	People's Party (PP)	Aragonese Party (PAR)
Toledo	519,664	People's Party (PP)	People's Party (PP)
Valencia	2,172,796	People's Party (PP)	People's Party (PP)
Valladolid	492,029	People's Party (PP)	People's Party (PP)
Zamora	205,201	People's Party (PP)	People's Party (PP)
Zaragoza	841,438	People's Party (PP)	Spanish Socialist Workers' Party (PSOE)

==== Island councils ====
The following table lists party control in the island councils. Gains for a party are highlighted in that party's colour.

Island	Population	Previous control	New control
El Hierro	7,679	Independent Herrenian Group (AHI)	Independent Herrenian Group (AHI)
Fuerteventura	49,020	Independents of Fuerteventura (IF)	Canarian Coalition (CC)
Gran Canaria	715,994	People's Party (PP)	People's Party (PP)
Ibiza–Formentera	89,903	People's Party (PP)	Progressive Pact (Pacte)
La Gomera	16,790	Spanish Socialist Workers' Party (PSOE)	Spanish Socialist Workers' Party (PSOE)
La Palma	78,198	Canarian Coalition (CC)	Canarian Coalition (CC)
Lanzarote	84,849	Spanish Socialist Workers' Party (PSOE)	Spanish Socialist Workers' Party (PSOE)
Mallorca	637,510	Majorcan Union (UM)	Majorcan Union (UM)
Menorca	69,070	People's Party (PP)	Spanish Socialist Workers' Party (PSOE)
Tenerife	677,485	Canarian Coalition (CC)	Canarian Coalition (CC)

==== Foral deputations ====
The following table lists party control in the foral deputations. Gains for a party are highlighted in that party's colour.

Province	Population	Previous control	New control
Álava	284,595	Basque Nationalist Party (EAJ/PNV)	People's Party (PP)
Biscay	1,137,594	Basque Nationalist Party (EAJ/PNV)	Basque Nationalist Party (EAJ/PNV)
Guipúzcoa	676,019	Basque Nationalist Party (EAJ/PNV)	Basque Nationalist Party (EAJ/PNV)

== Bibliography ==
- Constitución Española (Constitution). Official State Gazette (in Spanish). 27 December 1978 [version as of 28 August 1992]. BOE-A-1978-31229.
- Ley Orgánica 10/1982, de 10 de agosto, de Estatuto de Autonomía de Canarias (Organic Law 10/1982). Official State Gazette (in Spanish). 10 August 1982 [version as of 5 August 1997]. BOE-A-1982-20821.
- Ley Orgánica 2/1983, de 25 de febrero, de Estatuto de Autonomía para las islas Baleares (Organic Law 2/1983). Official State Gazette (in Spanish). 1 March 1983. BOE-A-1983-6316.
- Ley 27/1983, de 25 de noviembre, de Relaciones entre las Instituciones Comunes de la Comunidad Autónoma y los Órganos Forales de sus Territorios Históricos (Law 27/1983). Official State Gazette (in Spanish). 25 November 1983 [version as of 20 July 1993]. BOE-A-2012-5193.
- Ley 7/1985, de 2 de abril, Reguladora de las Bases del Régimen Local (Law 7/1985). Official State Gazette (in Spanish). 2 April 1985 [version as of 22 April 1999]. BOE-A-1985-5392.
- Ley Orgánica 5/1985, de 19 de junio, del Régimen Electoral General (Organic Law 5/1985). Official State Gazette (in Spanish). 19 June 1985 [version as of 22 April 1999]. BOE-A-1985-11672.
- Ley 8/1986, de 26 de noviembre, Electoral de la Comunidad Autónoma de las Islas Baleares (Law 8/1986). Official State Gazette (in Spanish). 26 November 1986 [version as of 30 December 1997]. BOE-A-1987-2903.
- Ley 1/1987, de 27 de marzo, de Elecciones para las Juntas Generales de los Territorios Históricos de Araba, Bizkaia y Gipuzkoa (Law 1/1987). Official State Gazette (in Spanish). 27 March 1987 [version as of 10 April 1987]. BOE-A-2012-3948.
- Ley 5/1989, de 13 de abril, de Consells Insulares (Law 5/1989). Official State Gazette (in Spanish). 13 April 1989. BOE-A-1989-16895.
- Ley 14/1990, de 26 de julio, de Régimen Jurídico de las Administraciones Públicas de Canarias (Law 14/1990). Official State Gazette (in Spanish). 26 July 1990 [version as of 11 November 1996]. BOE-A-1990-23140.
- Ley 2/1998, 3 de marzo, sobre el cambio de denominación de las provincias de La Coruña y Orense (Law 2/1998). Official State Gazette (in Spanish). 3 March 1998. BOE-A-1998-5184.
- Ley Orgánica 3/1999, de 8 de enero, de reforma de la Ley Orgánica 2/1983, de Estatuto de Autonomía de las Illes Balears (Organic Law 3/1999). Official State Gazette (in Spanish). 8 January 1999. BOE-A-1999-458.
- Real Decreto 606/1999, de 19 de abril, de convocatoria de elecciones Locales y a las Asambleas de Ceuta y Melilla (Royal Decree 606/1999). Official State Gazette (in Spanish). 19 April 1999. BOE-A-1999-8719.
- Real Decreto 1524/1999, de 4 de octubre, por el que se convocan elecciones locales parciales (Royal Decree 1524/1999). Official State Gazette (in Spanish). 4 October 1999. BOE-A-1999-19811.
