= 2011 Spanish local elections in the Community of Madrid =

This article presents the results breakdown of the local elections held in the Community of Madrid on 22 May 2011. The following tables show detailed results in the autonomous community's most populous municipalities, sorted alphabetically.

== City control ==
The following table lists party control in the most populous municipalities, including provincial capitals (shown in bold). Gains for a party are displayed with the cell's background shaded in that party's colour.

Municipality	Population	Previous control	New control
Alcalá de Henares	204,120	People's Party (PP)	People's Party (PP)
Alcobendas	110,080	People's Party (PP)	People's Party (PP)
Alcorcón	168,299	Spanish Socialist Workers' Party (PSOE)	People's Party (PP)
Coslada	91,218	Spanish Socialist Workers' Party (PSOE)	People's Party (PP)
Fuenlabrada	198,973	Spanish Socialist Workers' Party (PSOE)	Spanish Socialist Workers' Party (PSOE)
Getafe	169,130	Spanish Socialist Workers' Party (PSOE)	People's Party (PP)
Las Rozas de Madrid	88,065	People's Party (PP)	People's Party (PP)
Leganés	187,227	Spanish Socialist Workers' Party (PSOE)	People's Party (PP)
**Madrid**	3,273,049	People's Party (PP)	People's Party (PP)
Móstoles	206,015	People's Party (PP)	People's Party (PP)
Parla	120,182	Spanish Socialist Workers' Party (PSOE)	Spanish Socialist Workers' Party (PSOE)
Pozuelo de Alarcón	82,804	People's Party (PP)	People's Party (PP)
San Sebastián de los Reyes	78,157	People's Party (PP)	People's Party (PP)
Torrejón de Ardoz	118,441	People's Party (PP)	People's Party (PP)

== Municipalities ==
=== Alcalá de Henares ===
Population: 204,120

← Summary of the 22 May 2011 City Council of Alcalá de Henares election results →
Parties and alliances	Popular vote			Seats	
Parties and alliances	Votes	%	±pp	Total	+/−
People's Party (PP)	35,642	40.67	−8.16	12	−2
Spanish Socialist Workers' Party (PSOE)	27,936	31.88	−5.23	9	−2
United Left of the Community of Madrid–The Greens (IUCM–LV)	8,509	9.71	+2.75	3	+1
Union, Progress and Democracy (UPyD)	6,241	7.12	New	2	+2
Spain 2000 (E–2000)	4,541	5.18	New	1	+1
Ecolo–Greens (Ecolo)^{1}	1,348	1.54	−0.01	0	±0
National Democracy (DN)	671	0.77	New	0	±0
Spanish Alternative (AES)	234	0.27	New	0	±0
Humanist Party (PH)	202	0.23	+0.12	0	±0
Internationalist Solidarity and Self-Management (SAIn)	183	0.21	−0.12	0	±0
Castilian Party (PCAS)	99	0.11	New	0	±0
Blank ballots	2,024	2.31	+0.51		
Total	87,630			27	±0
Valid votes	87,630	98.52	−1.09		
Invalid votes	1,320	1.48	+1.09		
Votes cast / turnout	88,950	65.77	+2.79		
Abstentions	46,284	34.23	−2.79		
Registered voters	135,234				
Sources
Footnotes: ^{1} Ecolo–Greens results are compared to The Greens of the Community of Madrid totals in the 2007 election.

=== Alcobendas ===
Population: 110,080

← Summary of the 22 May 2011 City Council of Alcobendas election results →
Parties and alliances	Popular vote			Seats	
Parties and alliances	Votes	%	±pp	Total	+/−
People's Party (PP)	25,239	49.68	−0.21	15	+1
Union, Progress and Democracy (UPyD)	9,732	19.16	New	5	+5
Spanish Socialist Workers' Party (PSOE)	9,697	19.09	−17.66	5	−6
United Left of the Community of Madrid–The Greens (IUCM–LV)	3,438	6.77	−1.27	2	±0
Ecolo–Greens–Social Left (Ecolo)^{1}	1,164	2.29	+0.54	0	±0
Humanist Party (PH)	231	0.45	+0.23	0	±0
Spanish Alternative (AES)	198	0.39	+0.13	0	±0
Blank ballots	1,100	2.17	+0.03		
Total	50,799			27	±0
Valid votes	50,799	98.62	−0.66		
Invalid votes	713	1.38	+0.66		
Votes cast / turnout	51,512	68.65	+1.31		
Abstentions	23,529	31.35	−1.31		
Registered voters	75,041				
Sources
Footnotes: ^{1} Ecolo–Greens–Social Left results are compared to The Greens of the Community of Madrid totals in the 2007 election.

=== Alcorcón ===
Population: 168,299

← Summary of the 22 May 2011 City Council of Alcorcón election results →
Parties and alliances	Popular vote			Seats	
Parties and alliances	Votes	%	±pp	Total	+/−
People's Party (PP)	41,335	48.44	+6.27	15	+3
Spanish Socialist Workers' Party (PSOE)	26,806	31.41	−15.40	9	−5
United Left of the Community of Madrid–The Greens (IUCM–LV)	7,544	8.84	+3.09	2	+1
Union, Progress and Democracy (UPyD)	5,069	5.94	New	1	+1
Independent Neighbourhood Initiative of Alcorcón (IVIA)	1,195	1.40	New	0	±0
Ecolo–Greens (Ecolo)	1,117	1.31	New	0	±0
Communist Party of the Peoples of Spain (PCPE)	396	0.46	+0.17	0	±0
Blank ballots	1,870	2.19	+0.25		
Total	85,332			27	±0
Valid votes	85,332	98.49	−1.09		
Invalid votes	1,306	1.51	+1.09		
Votes cast / turnout	86,638	69.99	+2.80		
Abstentions	37,157	30.01	−2.80		
Registered voters	123,795				

=== Coslada ===
Population: 91,218

← Summary of the 22 May 2011 City Council of Coslada election results →
Parties and alliances	Popular vote			Seats	
Parties and alliances	Votes	%	±pp	Total	+/−
People's Party (PP)	16,010	39.40	−0.84	11	−1
Spanish Socialist Workers' Party (PSOE)	11,097	27.31	−6.22	8	−1
United Left of the Community of Madrid–The Greens (IUCM–LV)	5,382	13.24	+1.00	3	±0
Union, Progress and Democracy (UPyD)	3,213	7.91	New	2	+2
Republican Group of Coslada (ARCO)	2,343	5.77	+2.93	1	+1
Left Platform of Coslada (PIC)	679	1.67	−4.14	0	−1
Liberal Democratic Centre (CDL)	349	0.86	New	0	±0
Castilian Party (PCAS)	185	0.46	New	0	±0
Centre and Democracy Forum (CyD)	119	0.29	New	0	±0
Blank ballots	1,261	3.10	+1.16		
Total	40,638			25	±0
Valid votes	40,638	97.89	−1.55		
Invalid votes	874	2.11	+1.55		
Votes cast / turnout	41,512	68.18	+0.43		
Abstentions	19,375	31.82	−0.43		
Registered voters	60,887				

=== Fuenlabrada ===
Population: 198,973

← Summary of the 22 May 2011 City Council of Fuenlabrada election results →
Parties and alliances	Popular vote			Seats	
Parties and alliances	Votes	%	±pp	Total	+/−
Spanish Socialist Workers' Party (PSOE)	35,284	41.08	−13.08	12	−4
People's Party (PP)	32,977	38.39	+7.02	11	+2
United Left of the Community of Madrid–The Greens (IUCM–LV)	9,192	10.70	+2.24	3	+1
Union, Progress and Democracy (UPyD)	4,926	5.74	New	1	+1
Communist Unification of Spain (UCE)	681	0.79	New	0	±0
Liberal Centrist Union (UCL)	607	0.71	New	0	±0
Blank ballots	2,223	2.59	+0.81		
Total	85,890			27	±0
Valid votes	85,890	98.37	−1.12		
Invalid votes	1,426	1.63	+1.12		
Votes cast / turnout	87,316	63.34	+3.53		
Abstentions	50,538	36.66	−3.53		
Registered voters	137,854				

=== Getafe ===
Population: 169,130

← Summary of the 22 May 2011 City Council of Getafe election results →
Parties and alliances	Popular vote			Seats	
Parties and alliances	Votes	%	±pp	Total	+/−
People's Party (PP)	34,652	41.35	+4.99	12	+1
Spanish Socialist Workers' Party (PSOE)	26,711	31.87	−12.33	9	−4
United Left of the Community of Madrid–The Greens (IUCM–LV)	11,487	13.71	+2.00	4	+1
Union, Progress and Democracy (UPyD)	5,407	6.45	New	2	+2
Getafe Town Winds Neighbours' Association (AVVPG)	2,027	2.42	−1.38	0	±0
Internationalist Socialist Workers' Party (POSI)	543	0.65	+0.22	0	±0
Liberal Democratic Centre (CDL)	481	0.57	New	0	±0
Communist Unification of Spain (UCE)	269	0.32	New	0	±0
Diverse Citizens Party (PCiD)	237	0.28	New	0	±0
Anti-Bullfighting Party Against Mistreatment of Animals (PACMA)	12	0.01	New	0	±0
Blank ballots	1,974	2.36	+0.34		
Total	83,800			27	±0
Valid votes	83,800	98.15	−1.26		
Invalid votes	1,581	1.85	+1.26		
Votes cast / turnout	85,381	70.90	+3.62		
Abstentions	35,037	29.10	−3.62		
Registered voters	120,418				

=== Las Rozas de Madrid ===
Population: 88,065

← Summary of the 22 May 2011 City Council of Las Rozas de Madrid election results →
Parties and alliances	Popular vote			Seats	
Parties and alliances	Votes	%	±pp	Total	+/−
People's Party (PP)	24,364	57.72	−1.98	16	−1
Spanish Socialist Workers' Party (PSOE)	6,356	15.06	−12.50	4	−3
Union, Progress and Democracy (UPyD)	5,383	12.75	New	3	+3
United Left of the Community of Madrid–The Greens (IUCM–LV)	3,170	7.51	+2.49	2	+1
True Change Las Rozas (CVLR)	1,567	3.71	New	0	±0
Blank ballots	1,372	3.25	−0.65		
Total	42,212			25	±0
Valid votes	42,212	98.54	−0.92		
Invalid votes	624	1.46	+0.92		
Votes cast / turnout	42,836	70.93	−0.81		
Abstentions	17,554	29.07	+0.81		
Registered voters	60,390				

=== Leganés ===
Population: 187,227

← Summary of the 22 May 2011 City Council of Leganés election results →
Parties and alliances	Popular vote			Seats	
Parties and alliances	Votes	%	±pp	Total	+/−
People's Party (PP)	37,445	40.08	+0.67	12	±0
Spanish Socialist Workers' Party (PSOE)	25,900	27.72	−10.53	8	−3
Union for Leganés (ULEG)	12,409	13.28	+7.39	4	+3
United Left of the Community of Madrid–The Greens (IUCM–LV)	10,723	11.48	−1.47	3	±0
Union, Progress and Democracy (UPyD)	3,737	4.00	New	0	±0
Communist Party of the Peoples of Spain (PCPE)	678	0.73	+0.39	0	±0
Communist Unification of Spain (UCE)	495	0.53	New	0	±0
Blank ballots	2,035	2.18	+0.70		
Total	93,422			27	±0
Valid votes	93,422	98.33	−1.19		
Invalid votes	1,586	1.67	+1.19		
Votes cast / turnout	95,008	69.05	+2.42		
Abstentions	42,595	30.95	−2.42		
Registered voters	137,603				

=== Madrid ===
Population: 3,273,049

=== Móstoles ===
Population: 206,015

← Summary of the 22 May 2011 City Council of Móstoles election results →
Parties and alliances	Popular vote			Seats	
Parties and alliances	Votes	%	±pp	Total	+/−
People's Party (PP)	53,419	55.92	+1.83	17	+1
Spanish Socialist Workers' Party (PSOE)	23,568	24.67	−10.85	7	−3
United Left of the Community of Madrid–The Greens (IUCM–LV)	9,260	9.69	+3.55	3	+2
Union, Progress and Democracy (UPyD)	4,275	4.47	New	0	±0
The Greens of Madrid (LVM)	1,866	1.95	−0.20	0	±0
Mostolenian Socialism (SOMOS)	776	0.81	New	0	±0
Blank ballots	2,367	2.48	+0.79		
Total	95,531			27	±0
Valid votes	95,531	98.40	−1.13		
Invalid votes	1,549	1.60	+1.13		
Votes cast / turnout	97,080	64.52	+0.11		
Abstentions	53,389	35.48	−0.11		
Registered voters	150,469				

=== Parla ===
Population: 120,182

← Summary of the 22 May 2011 City Council of Parla election results →
Parties and alliances	Popular vote			Seats	
Parties and alliances	Votes	%	±pp	Total	+/−
Spanish Socialist Workers' Party (PSOE)	17,274	37.14	−37.29	11	−9
People's Party (PP)	17,252	37.09	+20.48	11	+7
United Left of the Community of Madrid–The Greens (IUCM–LV)	6,671	14.34	+8.19	4	+3
Union, Progress and Democracy (UPyD)	2,568	5.52	New	1	+1
Anti-Bullfighting Party Against Mistreatment of Animals (PACMA)	512	1.10	New	0	±0
Municipal Democratic Platform (PDM)	418	0.90	New	0	±0
Citizen Union for Democracy (UCiD)	365	0.78	New	0	±0
Diverse Citizens Party (PCiD)	241	0.52	New	0	±0
Blank ballots	1,208	2.60	+1.24		
Total	46,509			27	+2
Valid votes	46,509	98.35	−1.16		
Invalid votes	780	1.65	+1.16		
Votes cast / turnout	47,289	64.96	+1.84		
Abstentions	25,511	35.04	−1.84		
Registered voters	72,800				

=== Pozuelo de Alarcón ===
Population: 82,804

← Summary of the 22 May 2011 City Council of Pozuelo de Alarcón election results →
Parties and alliances	Popular vote			Seats	
Parties and alliances	Votes	%	±pp	Total	+/−
People's Party (PP)	25,319	61.34	−1.84	17	−2
Spanish Socialist Workers' Party (PSOE)	6,662	16.14	−7.68	4	−2
Union, Progress and Democracy (UPyD)	4,519	10.95	New	3	+3
United Left of the Community of Madrid–The Greens (IUCM–LV)	2,080	5.04	+2.59	1	+1
Liberal Democratic Centre (CDL)	670	1.62	New	0	±0
Citizens–Party of the Citizenry (C's)	384	0.93	New	0	±0
The Phalanx (FE)	213	0.52	New	0	±0
Blank ballots	1,427	3.46	+0.95		
Total	41,274			25	±0
Valid votes	41,274	98.44	−1.14		
Invalid votes	654	1.56	+1.14		
Votes cast / turnout	41,928	72.42	−0.28		
Abstentions	15,966	27.58	+0.28		
Registered voters	57,894				

=== San Sebastián de los Reyes ===
Population: 78,157

← Summary of the 22 May 2011 City Council of San Sebastián de los Reyes election results →
Parties and alliances	Popular vote			Seats	
Parties and alliances	Votes	%	±pp	Total	+/−
People's Party (PP)	18,277	49.53	+0.56	14	+1
Spanish Socialist Workers' Party (PSOE)	7,085	19.20	−11.43	5	−3
Independent Left–Initiative for San Sebastián de los Reyes (II–ISSR)	6,213	16.84	+6.34	5	+2
United Left of the Community of Madrid–The Greens (IUCM–LV)	2,302	6.24	+0.85	1	±0
Union, Progress and Democracy (UPyD)	1,782	4.83	New	0	±0
Progressive Left Union San Sebastián de los Reyes (UPIS)	291	0.79	New	0	±0
Blank ballots	949	2.57	+0.42		
Total	36,899			25	±0
Valid votes	36,899	98.66	−0.82		
Invalid votes	502	1.34	+0.82		
Votes cast / turnout	37,401	66.52	+1.38		
Abstentions	18,821	33.48	−1.38		
Registered voters	56,222				

=== Torrejón de Ardoz ===
Population: 118,441

← Summary of the 22 May 2011 City Council of Torrejón de Ardoz election results →
Parties and alliances	Popular vote			Seats	
Parties and alliances	Votes	%	±pp	Total	+/−
People's Party (PP)	36,917	68.53	+25.26	21	+7
Spanish Socialist Workers' Party (PSOE)	8,291	15.39	−23.88	4	−8
United Left of the Community of Madrid–The Greens (IUCM–LV)	4,994	9.27	+3.22	2	+1
Union, Progress and Democracy (UPyD)	2,124	3.94	New	0	±0
Centre and Democracy Forum (CyD)	195	0.36	New	0	±0
Blank ballots	1,348	2.50	+0.68		
Total	53,869			27	±0
Valid votes	53,869	98.25	−1.28		
Invalid votes	961	1.75	+1.28		
Votes cast / turnout	54,830	67.01	+3.81		
Abstentions	26,994	32.99	−3.81		
Registered voters	81,824				

== See also ==
- 2011 Madrilenian regional election
