= 1991 Spanish local elections in the Community of Madrid =

This article presents the results breakdown of the local elections held in the Community of Madrid on 26 May 1991. The following tables show detailed results in the autonomous community's most populous municipalities, sorted alphabetically.

== City control ==
The following table lists party control in the most populous municipalities, including provincial capitals (highlighted in bold). Gains for a party are highlighted in that party's colour.

Municipality	Population	Previous control	New control
Alcalá de Henares	155,548	Spanish Socialist Workers' Party (PSOE)	Spanish Socialist Workers' Party (PSOE)
Alcobendas	78,295	Spanish Socialist Workers' Party (PSOE)	Spanish Socialist Workers' Party (PSOE)
Alcorcón	141,080	Spanish Socialist Workers' Party (PSOE)	Spanish Socialist Workers' Party (PSOE)
Coslada	73,252	United Left (IU)	United Left (IU)
Fuenlabrada	141,496	Spanish Socialist Workers' Party (PSOE)	Spanish Socialist Workers' Party (PSOE)
Getafe	139,068	Spanish Socialist Workers' Party (PSOE)	Spanish Socialist Workers' Party (PSOE)
Leganés	172,729	Spanish Socialist Workers' Party (PSOE)	Spanish Socialist Workers' Party (PSOE)
**Madrid**	3,120,732	Democratic and Social Centre (CDS)	People's Party (PP)
Móstoles	189,707	Spanish Socialist Workers' Party (PSOE)	Spanish Socialist Workers' Party (PSOE)
Parla	69,017	Spanish Socialist Workers' Party (PSOE)	Spanish Socialist Workers' Party (PSOE)
Torrejón de Ardoz	86,678	Spanish Socialist Workers' Party (PSOE)	Spanish Socialist Workers' Party (PSOE)

== Municipalities ==
=== Alcalá de Henares ===
Population: 155,548

← Summary of the 26 May 1991 City Council of Alcalá de Henares election results →
Parties and alliances	Popular vote			Seats	
Parties and alliances	Votes	%	±pp	Total	+/−
Spanish Socialist Workers' Party (PSOE)	23,344	40.29	−3.57	13	±0
People's Party (PP)^{1}	14,801	25.55	+8.01	8	+3
United Left (IU)	10,689	18.45	+5.64	6	+2
Democratic and Social Centre (CDS)	2,766	4.77	−13.80	0	−5
Green Union (UVE)	1,470	2.54	New	0	±0
Alcalá Independent Renovators (RIA)	1,187	2.05	New	0	±0
Left Platform (PCE (m–l)–CRPE)^{2}	1,180	2.04	+1.84	0	±0
Democratic Ecologist Cooperation (CED)	594	1.03	New	0	±0
Madrilenian Independent Regional Party (PRIM)	589	1.02	New	0	±0
Spanish Phalanx of the CNSO (FE–JONS)	329	0.57	New	0	±0
Blank ballots	986	1.70	+0.41		
Total	57,935			27	±0
Valid votes	57,935	99.44	+0.83		
Invalid votes	325	0.56	−0.83		
Votes cast / turnout	58,260	52.65	−12.52		
Abstentions	52,400	47.35	+12.52		
Registered voters	110,660				
Sources
Footnotes: ^{1} People's Party results are compared to the combined totals of People's Alliance and People's Democratic Party in the 1987 election.; ^{2} Left Platform results are compared to Republican Popular Unity totals in the 1987 election.

=== Alcobendas ===
Population: 78,295

← Summary of the 26 May 1991 City Council of Alcobendas election results →
Parties and alliances	Popular vote			Seats	
Parties and alliances	Votes	%	±pp	Total	+/−
Spanish Socialist Workers' Party (PSOE)	16,698	54.03	+4.22	15	+1
People's Party (PP)^{1}	9,563	30.94	+6.69	8	+1
United Left (IU)	2,378	7.69	+3.76	2	+2
Democratic and Social Centre (CDS)	876	2.83	−12.77	0	−4
The Greens (LV)	658	2.13	New	0	±0
Convergence of Independent Candidacies (CCI)	230	0.74	New	0	±0
Madrilenian Independent Regional Party (PRIM)	98	0.32	New	0	±0
Party of Madrid (PAM)	71	0.23	New	0	±0
Blank ballots	334	1.08	+0.02		
Total	30,906			25	±0
Valid votes	30,906	99.54	+0.58		
Invalid votes	142	0.46	−0.58		
Votes cast / turnout	31,048	58.83	−10.98		
Abstentions	21,729	41.17	+10.98		
Registered voters	52,777				
Sources
Footnotes: ^{1} People's Party results are compared to the combined totals of People's Alliance and People's Democratic Party in the 1987 election.

=== Alcorcón ===
Population: 141,080

← Summary of the 26 May 1991 City Council of Alcorcón election results →
Parties and alliances	Popular vote			Seats	
Parties and alliances	Votes	%	±pp	Total	+/−
Spanish Socialist Workers' Party (PSOE)	24,077	42.32	−4.58	13	−1
People's Party (PP)^{1}	17,468	30.70	+12.68	9	+4
United Left (IU)	7,504	13.19	+5.04	4	+2
Democratic and Social Centre (CDS)	3,196	5.62	−15.05	1	−5
The Ecologists (LE)	1,230	2.16	New	0	±0
Party of Madrid (PAM)	883	1.55	New	0	±0
Left Democratic Platform (PDI)	698	1.23	New	0	±0
Spanish Phalanx of the CNSO (FE–JONS)	367	0.65	New	0	±0
Workers' Socialist Party (PST)	240	0.42	New	0	±0
Madrilenian Independent Regional Party (PRIM)	191	0.34	New	0	±0
Left Platform (PCE (m–l)–CRPE)	149	0.26	New	0	±0
Convergence of Independent Candidacies (CCI)	86	0.15	New	0	±0
Blank ballots	801	1.41	+0.22		
Total	56,890			27	±0
Valid votes	56,890	99.50	+0.72		
Invalid votes	287	0.50	−0.72		
Votes cast / turnout	57,177	55.11	−13.95		
Abstentions	46,580	44.89	+13.95		
Registered voters	103,757				
Sources
Footnotes: ^{1} People's Party results are compared to the combined totals of People's Alliance and People's Democratic Party in the 1987 election.

=== Coslada ===
Population: 73,252

← Summary of the 26 May 1991 City Council of Coslada election results →
Parties and alliances	Popular vote			Seats	
Parties and alliances	Votes	%	±pp	Total	+/−
United Left (IU)	13,298	51.64	+15.53	14	+4
Spanish Socialist Workers' Party (PSOE)	7,684	29.84	−4.59	8	−2
People's Party (PP)^{1}	3,224	12.52	+3.17	3	+1
Democratic and Social Centre (CDS)	1,015	3.94	−9.49	0	−3
Madrilenian Independent Regional Party (PRIM)	212	0.82	New	0	±0
Blank ballots	320	1.24	+0.02		
Total	25,753			25	±0
Valid votes	25,753	99.46	+0.61		
Invalid votes	141	0.54	−0.61		
Votes cast / turnout	25,894	54.14	−13.95		
Abstentions	21,937	45.86	+13.95		
Registered voters	47,831				
Sources
Footnotes: ^{1} People's Party results are compared to People's Alliance totals in the 1987 election.

=== Fuenlabrada ===
Population: 141,496

← Summary of the 26 May 1991 City Council of Fuenlabrada election results →
Parties and alliances	Popular vote			Seats	
Parties and alliances	Votes	%	±pp	Total	+/−
Spanish Socialist Workers' Party (PSOE)	24,883	58.21	+1.41	18	+1
People's Party (PP)^{1}	7,514	17.58	+5.48	5	+2
United Left (IU)	6,624	15.50	+7.17	4	+2
Democratic and Social Centre (CDS)	1,539	3.60	−12.52	0	−5
The Ecologists (LE)	950	2.22	New	0	±0
Madrilenian Independent Regional Party (PRIM)	291	0.68	New	0	±0
Convergence of Independent Candidacies (CCI)	240	0.56	New	0	±0
Spanish Phalanx of the CNSO (FE–JONS)	144	0.34	−0.14	0	±0
Left Platform (PCE (m–l)–CRPE)^{2}	118	0.28	+0.06	0	±0
Alliance for the Republic (AxR)	115	0.27	New	0	±0
Blank ballots	326	0.76	−0.32		
Total	42,744			27	±0
Valid votes	42,744	99.66	+0.96		
Invalid votes	147	0.34	−0.96		
Votes cast / turnout	42,891	49.15	−14.34		
Abstentions	44,367	50.85	+14.34		
Registered voters	87,258				
Sources
Footnotes: ^{1} People's Party results are compared to the combined totals of People's Alliance and People's Democratic Party in the 1987 election.; ^{2} Left Platform results are compared to Republican Popular Unity totals in the 1987 election.

=== Getafe ===
Population: 139,068

← Summary of the 26 May 1991 City Council of Getafe election results →
Parties and alliances	Popular vote			Seats	
Parties and alliances	Votes	%	±pp	Total	+/−
Spanish Socialist Workers' Party (PSOE)	29,479	50.05	+2.76	15	+1
People's Party (PP)^{1}	11,854	20.13	+4.99	6	+2
United Left (IU)	11,682	19.83	+3.21	6	+1
Democratic and Social Centre (CDS)	2,642	4.49	−10.77	0	−4
The Greens (LV)	840	1.43	New	0	±0
Independent Candidacy Getafe (GCI)	588	1.00	New	0	±0
Workers' Socialist Party (PST)	355	0.60	−0.06	0	±0
The Ecologists (LE)	333	0.57	New	0	±0
Alliance for the Republic (AxR)^{2}	228	0.39	+0.02	0	±0
Spanish Phalanx of the CNSO (FE–JONS)	196	0.33	New	0	±0
Madrilenian Independent Regional Party (PRIM)	115	0.20	New	0	±0
Blank ballots	586	0.99	−0.93		
Total	58,898			27	±0
Valid votes	58,898	99.37	+0.89		
Invalid votes	374	0.63	−0.89		
Votes cast / turnout	59,272	58.31	−13.63		
Abstentions	42,385	41.69	+13.63		
Registered voters	101,657				
Sources
Footnotes: ^{1} People's Party results are compared to the combined totals of People's Alliance and People's Democratic Party in the 1987 election.; ^{2} Alliance for the Republic results are compared to Internationalist Socialist Workers' Party totals in the 1987 election.

=== Leganés ===
Population: 172,729

← Summary of the 26 May 1991 City Council of Leganés election results →
Parties and alliances	Popular vote			Seats	
Parties and alliances	Votes	%	±pp	Total	+/−
Spanish Socialist Workers' Party (PSOE)	31,967	47.70	−5.57	14	−2
United Left (IU)	13,631	20.34	+9.43	6	+3
People's Party (PP)^{1}	13,438	20.05	+7.44	6	+3
Democratic and Social Centre (CDS)	3,377	5.04	−11.39	1	−4
The Greens (LV)	1,328	1.98	New	0	±0
The Ecologists (LE)	608	0.91	New	0	±0
Convergence of Independent Candidacies (CCI)	531	0.79	New	0	±0
Madrilenian Independent Regional Party (PRIM)	485	0.72	New	0	±0
Workers' Socialist Party (PST)	402	0.60	New	0	±0
Left Platform (PCE (m–l)–CRPE)^{2}	174	0.26	+0.04	0	±0
Party of Madrid (PAM)	160	0.24	New	0	±0
Blank ballots	921	1.37	+0.34		
Total	67,022			27	±0
Valid votes	67,022	99.47	+0.97		
Invalid votes	356	0.53	−0.97		
Votes cast / turnout	67,378	54.24	−14.91		
Abstentions	56,854	45.76	+14.91		
Registered voters	124,232				
Sources
Footnotes: ^{1} People's Party results are compared to the combined totals of People's Alliance and People's Democratic Party in the 1987 election.; ^{2} Left Platform results are compared to Republican Popular Unity totals in the 1987 election.

=== Madrid ===
Population: 3,120,732

=== Móstoles ===
Population: 189,707

← Summary of the 26 May 1991 City Council of Móstoles election results →
Parties and alliances	Popular vote			Seats	
Parties and alliances	Votes	%	±pp	Total	+/−
Spanish Socialist Workers' Party (PSOE)	22,803	36.59	−8.74	11	−2
People's Party (PP)^{1}	19,890	31.92	+14.65	10	+5
United Left (IU)	10,896	17.48	+7.68	5	+2
Democratic and Social Centre (CDS)	3,313	5.32	−16.35	1	−5
The Greens (LV)	2,702	4.34	New	0	±0
Green Union (UVE)	709	1.14	New	0	±0
Democratic Platform for Móstoles (PDxM)	479	0.77	New	0	±0
Revolutionary Communist League (LCR)	254	0.41	−0.06	0	±0
Party of Madrid (PAM)	236	0.38	New	0	±0
Madrilenian Independent Regional Party (PRIM)	223	0.36	New	0	±0
Blank ballots	813	1.30	+0.21		
Total	62,318			27	±0
Valid votes	62,318	99.52	+0.72		
Invalid votes	300	0.48	−0.72		
Votes cast / turnout	62,618	50.39	−13.02		
Abstentions	61,658	49.61	+13.02		
Registered voters	124,276				
Sources
Footnotes: ^{1} People's Party results are compared to the combined totals of People's Alliance and People's Democratic Party in the 1987 election.

=== Parla ===
Population: 69,017

← Summary of the 26 May 1991 City Council of Parla election results →
Parties and alliances	Popular vote			Seats	
Parties and alliances	Votes	%	±pp	Total	+/−
Spanish Socialist Workers' Party (PSOE)	9,475	42.90	−8.44	12	−3
United Left (IU)	6,733	30.48	+13.42	8	+4
People's Party (PP)^{1}	3,925	17.77	+5.39	5	+1
Democratic and Social Centre (CDS)	1,090	4.93	−7.98	0	−3
Left Platform (PCE (m–l)–CRPE)	341	1.54	New	0	±0
Madrilenian Independent Regional Party (PRIM)	293	1.33	New	0	±0
Blank ballots	231	1.05	+0.05		
Total	22,088			25	±0
Valid votes	22,088	99.52	+0.65		
Invalid votes	106	0.48	−0.65		
Votes cast / turnout	22,194	49.52	−17.06		
Abstentions	22,628	50.48	+17.06		
Registered voters	44,822				
Sources
Footnotes: ^{1} People's Party results are compared to the combined totals of People's Alliance and People's Democratic Party in the 1987 election.

=== Torrejón de Ardoz ===
Population: 86,678

← Summary of the 26 May 1991 City Council of Torrejón de Ardoz election results →
Parties and alliances	Popular vote			Seats	
Parties and alliances	Votes	%	±pp	Total	+/−
Spanish Socialist Workers' Party (PSOE)	9,074	31.98	−8.83	9	−2
People's Party (PP)^{1}	7,598	26.78	+9.12	8	+4
United Left (IU)	5,346	18.84	+3.71	5	+1
Independent Group of Torrejón (GIT)	3,062	10.79	New	3	+3
Democratic and Social Centre (CDS)	1,358	4.79	−13.52	0	−5
The Greens (LV)	1,029	3.63	New	0	±0
Madrilenian Independent Regional Party (PRIM)	226	0.80	New	0	±0
Party of Madrid (PAM)	149	0.53	New	0	±0
Spanish Phalanx of the CNSO (FE–JONS)	130	0.46	New	0	±0
Workers' Party of Spain–Communist Unity (PTE–UC)	n/a	n/a	−5.71	0	−1
Blank ballots	398	1.40	−0.09		
Total	28,370			25	±0
Valid votes	28,370	99.39	+0.35		
Invalid votes	173	0.61	−0.35		
Votes cast / turnout	28,543	51.14	−15.99		
Abstentions	27,274	48.86	+15.99		
Registered voters	55,817				
Sources
Footnotes: ^{1} People's Party results are compared to the combined totals of People's Alliance and People's Democratic Party in the 1987 election.

== See also ==
- 1991 Madrilenian regional election
