= The Greens of the Community of Madrid =

The Greens of the Community of Madrid Los Verdes de la Comunidad de Madrid
- Secretary: Nicolás González Fernández
- Founded: 1995
- Dissolved: 2011
- Merged into: Equo
- Headquarters: Apdo. de Correos 137, 28220, Majadahonda, Madrid
- Ideology: Ecologism; Anti-capitalism

Website
- www.losverdes.info

The Greens of the Community of Madrid (Spanish: Los Verdes de la Comunidad de Madrid, LVCM) was a Spanish political party.
