= Spanish Democratic Party =

Spanish Democratic Party Partido Demócrata Español
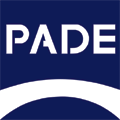
- President: Juan Ramón Calero
- Founded: 1996
- Dissolved: 10 May 2008
- Split from: PP
- Headquarters: C/ Francisco Silvela, 77; 28028 Madrid, Spain
- Ideology: Conservatism; Christian humanism
- Political position: Right-wing to far-right

The Spanish Democratic Party (Spanish: Partido Demócrata Español; PADE) was a conservative political party in Spain, created as a split from the centre-right People's Party in 1996. Its chairman was Juan Ramón Calero Rodríguez, former PP spokesperson in Congress.

== Ideology ==
It regarded itself as being to the right of the People's Party, with some sources regarding it as a far-right party. This was denied by the party, which described itself as christian humanist, liberal-reformist and moderate.
