= United Left of the Community of Madrid =

United Left of the Community of Madrid Izquierda Unida Comunidad de Madrid
- Founded: 29 April 1986
- Dissolved: 14 June 2015 (expulsion from United Left)
- Succeeded by: United Left–Madrid
- Ideology: Democratic socialism Anti-capitalism; Republicanism; Participative democracy Federalism; Environmentalism; Secularism
- Political position: Left-wing
- National affiliation: United Left (1986–2015)

Website
- www.iucm.org

United Left of the Community of Madrid (Spanish: Izquierda Unida Comunidad de Madrid, IU–CM or IUCM) was the regional branch in the Community of Madrid of United Left until 2015. The party was expelled from the main organization in June 2015.

In the municipal and regional elections of that year, IUCM did not obtain representation, for the first time in its history, in either the Assembly of Madrid or the Madrid City Council, the latter candidacy having been expressly disavowed by the federal leadership. For its part, the critical sector obtained several councilors in coalition candidacies such as Ahora Madrid.

The Spanish Patent and Trademark Office rejected the use of the acronyms IU or IUCM by this party once it had been expelled and finally, on April 2 and 3, the new Madrid federation was formed under the name of Izquierda Unida-Madrid, putting an end to the internal crisis of this formation in this region.
