= Opinion polling for the 2015 Spanish local elections =

In the run up to the 2015 Spanish local elections, various organisations carried out opinion polling to gauge voting intention in local entities in Spain. Results of such polls are displayed in this article. The date range for these opinion polls are from the previous local elections, held on 22 May 2011, to the day the next elections were held, on 24 May 2015.

Polls are listed in reverse chronological order, showing the most recent first and using the dates when the survey fieldwork was done, as opposed to the date of publication. Where the fieldwork dates are unknown, the date of publication is given instead. The highest percentage figure in each polling survey is displayed with its background shaded in the leading party's colour. If a tie ensues, this is applied to the figures with the highest percentages. The "Lead" columns on the right shows the percentage-point difference between the parties with the highest percentages in a given poll.

== Nationwide polling ==
The table below lists nationwide voting intention estimates. Refusals are generally excluded from the party vote percentages, while question wording and the treatment of "don't know" responses and those not intending to vote may vary between polling organisations.

Color key:

Poll conducted after legal ban on opinion polls

Polling firm/Commissioner	Fieldwork date	Sample size	Turnout	PP	PSOE	IU	CiU	UPyD	PNV	EH Bildu	ERC	Podemos	C's	Lead
2015 local elections	24 May 2015	—N/a	64.9	27.0	25.0	6.4	3.0	1.0	1.8	1.5	3.6	7.9	6.6	2.0
GAD3/Antena 3	11–22 May 2015	?	?	27.0	25.0	5.0	–	–	–	–	–	10.0	7.0	2.0
2011 local elections	22 May 2011	—N/a	66.2	37.5	27.8	7.4	3.5	2.1	1.4	1.4	1.2	–	–	9.7

== Sub-national polling ==
Opinion poll results for municipalities in each of Spain's autonomous communities, as well as for the Canarian cabildos insulares and the Balearic island councils, may be found through the following links:

- Opinion polling for the 2015 Spanish local elections (Andalusia)
- Opinion polling for the 2015 Spanish local elections (Aragon)
- Opinion polling for the 2015 Spanish local elections (Asturias)
- Opinion polling for the 2015 Spanish local elections (Balearic Islands)
- Opinion polling for the 2015 Spanish local elections (Basque Country)
- Opinion polling for the 2015 Spanish local elections (Canary Islands)
- Opinion polling for the 2015 Spanish local elections (Cantabria)
- Opinion polling for the 2015 Spanish local elections (Castile and León)
- Opinion polling for the 2015 Spanish local elections (Castilla–La Mancha)
- Opinion polling for the 2015 Spanish local elections (Catalonia)
- Opinion polling for the 2015 Spanish local elections (Extremadura)
- Opinion polling for the 2015 Spanish local elections (Galicia)
- Opinion polling for the 2015 Spanish local elections (La Rioja)
- Opinion polling for the 2015 Spanish local elections (Community of Madrid)
- Opinion polling for the 2015 Spanish local elections (Region of Murcia)
- Opinion polling for the 2015 Spanish local elections (Navarre)
- Opinion polling for the 2015 Spanish local elections (Valencian Community)
