= Opinion polling for the 2015 Spanish local elections (Aragon) =

In the run up to the 2015 Spanish local elections, various organisations carried out opinion polling to gauge voting intention in local entities in Spain. Results of such polls for municipalities in Asturias are displayed in this article. The date range for these opinion polls is from the previous local elections, held on 22 May 2011, to the day the next elections were held, on 24 May 2015.

Polls are listed in reverse chronological order, showing the most recent first and using the dates when the survey fieldwork was done, as opposed to the date of publication. Where the fieldwork dates are unknown, the date of publication is given instead. The highest percentage figure in each polling survey is displayed with its background shaded in the leading party's colour. If a tie ensues, this is applied to the figures with the highest percentages. The "Lead" columns on the right shows the percentage-point difference between the parties with the highest percentages in a given poll.

== Municipalities ==
=== Huesca ===
Color key:

Exit poll

Polling firm/Commissioner	Fieldwork date	Sample size	Turnout	PP	PSOE	PAR	CHA	CH	UPyD	ASP	C's	Lead
2015 municipal election	24 May 2015	—N/a	63.8	30.9; 9	24.9; 8	4.3; 0	4.2; 0	13.6; 4	0.9; 0	8.7; 2	9.1; 2	6.0
TNS Demoscopia/RTVE–FORTA	24 May 2015	?	?	27.1; 7/8	22.9; 6/7	–	4.8; 0/1	15.9; 4/5	–	11.3; 3/4	10.6; 2/3	4.2
A+M/Heraldo de Aragón	6–10 Apr 2015	719	68.3	32.2; 8/10	24.1; 6/8	5.8; 0/1	5.7; 0/1	5.4; 0/1	1.0; 0	11.9; 3/4	11.0; 3/4	8.1
A+M/Heraldo de Aragón	12–17 Mar 2014	500	60.1	34.5; 10/11	31.8; 9/10	4.0; 0	3.5; 0	10.9; 2/3	7.7; 1/2	–	–	2.7
2011 municipal election	22 May 2011	—N/a	63.8	38.1; 11	31.5; 9	6.9; 2	6.8; 2	6.5 (Note: Results for IU.); 1	2.3; 0	–	–	6.6

=== Teruel ===
Color key:

Exit poll

Polling firm/Commissioner	Fieldwork date	Sample size	Turnout	PP	PSOE	CHA	GT	PAR	CCA	UPyD	C's	Lead
2015 municipal election	24 May 2015	—N/a	63.9	32.2; 8	19.8; 5	7.5; 1	15.0; 3	10.1; 2	2.0; 0	–	9.5; 2	12.4
TNS Demoscopia/RTVE–FORTA	24 May 2015	?	?	34.2; 8/10	18.8; 4/5	6.3; 1	13.7; 2/3	6.8; 1/2	3.3; 0/1	–	11.7; 3/4	15.4
A+M/Heraldo de Aragón	13–15 Apr 2015	561	71.5	35.8; 8/10	14.4; 3/4	5.8; 0/1	14.9; 3/4	5.4; 0/1	3.7; 0	–	14.7; 3/4	20.9
A+M/Heraldo de Aragón	17–22 Mar 2014	500	60.6	41.7; 10/14	21.8; 5/6	11.6; 3/4	7.2; 1/2	4.6; 0/1	–	5.5; 0/1	–	19.9
2011 municipal election	22 May 2011	—N/a	65.1	47.8; 12	20.9; 5	8.4; 2	7.1; 1	7.1; 1	2.7; 0	2.1; 0	–	26.9
