= Opinion polling for the 2023 Spanish local elections (Aragon) =

In the run up to the 2023 Spanish local elections, various organisations carried out opinion polling to gauge voting intention in local entities in Spain. Results of such polls for municipalities in Aragon are displayed in this article. The date range for these opinion polls is from the previous local elections, held on 26 May 2019, to the day the next elections were held, on 28 May 2023.

Polls are listed in reverse chronological order, showing the most recent first and using the dates when the survey fieldwork was done, as opposed to the date of publication. Where the fieldwork dates are unknown, the date of publication is given instead. The highest percentage figure in each polling survey is displayed with its background shaded in the leading party's colour. If a tie ensues, this is applied to the figures with the highest percentages. The "Lead" columns on the right shows the percentage-point difference between the parties with the highest percentages in a given poll.

== Municipalities ==
=== Alcañiz ===
Polling firm/Commissioner	Fieldwork date	Sample size	Turnout	PSOE	PP	PAR	CS	IU	Podemos	Vox	Existe	Lead
2023 municipal election	28 May 2023	—N/a	67.0	33.1; 6	37.3; 7	5.0; 1	–	6.2; 1	1.7; 0	6.3; 1	8.1; 1	4.2
A+M/Heraldo de Aragón	27 Mar–9 Apr 2023	400	66.7	34.1; 7/8	33.2; 6/7	13.7; 2/3	2.8; 0	7.4; 1	3.1; 0	–	–	0.9
2019 municipal election	26 May 2019	—N/a	67.3	37.1; 7	27.6; 5	16.6; 3	7.3; 1	6.3; 1	3.8; 0	–	–	9.5

=== Barbastro ===
Polling firm/Commissioner	Fieldwork date	Sample size	Turnout	PP	PSOE	CS	PAR	ECC	BeC	Vox	CHA	Lead
2023 municipal election	28 May 2023	—N/a	64.4	38.7; 8	35.0; 7	2.0; 0	4.4; 0	6.3; 1	(Note: Within ECC Barbastro.)	6.1; 1	3.1; 0	3.7
A+M/Heraldo de Aragón	27 Mar–9 Apr 2023	400	66.6	38.9; 7/8	30.0; 5/6	4.4; 0	5.6; 0/1	5.3; 0/1	5.7; 0/1	5.7; 0/1	3.3; 0	8.9
2019 municipal election	26 May 2019	—N/a	64.7	31.2; 6	26.5; 5	11.8; 2	7.5; 1	6.9; 1	6.1; 1	5.2; 1	3.6; 0	4.7

=== Calatayud ===
Polling firm/Commissioner	Fieldwork date	Sample size	Turnout	PP	PSOE	CS	PAR	Vox	Podemos	CHA	Lead
2023 municipal election	28 May 2023	—N/a	64.6	48.7; 10	27.0; 5	5.3; 1	4.0; 0	6.4; 1	–	5.0; 0	21.7
A+M/Heraldo de Aragón	27 Mar–9 Apr 2023	400	67.5	48.8; 10/11	28.3; 5/6	3.5; 0	5.3; 0/1	5.0; 0/1	3.3; 0	4.5; 0	20.5
2019 municipal election	26 May 2019	—N/a	65.5	35.1; 9	27.7; 7	14.2; 3	7.0; 1	5.5; 1	4.6; 0	3.7; 0	7.4

=== Cuarte de Huerva ===
Polling firm/Commissioner	Fieldwork date	Sample size	Turnout	PAR	PSOE	CS	PP	Vox	CHA	Podemos	IU	CeC	Lead
2023 municipal election	28 May 2023	—N/a	66.9	2.3; 0	18.7; 4	9.7; 2	27.3; 5	13.9; 2	6.0; 1	2.2; 0	1.0; 0	14.7; 3	8.6
A+M/Heraldo de Aragón	27 Mar–9 Apr 2023	400	65.3	24.8; 5/6	21.1; 4	2.9; 0	22.4; 5/6	12.6; 2	8.7; 1	3.1; 0	3.2; 0	–	2.4
2019 municipal election	26 May 2019	—N/a	64.8	32.3; 6	19.8; 4	12.8; 2	10.3; 2	9.3; 2	8.5; 1	4.0; 0	2.2; 0	–	12.5

=== Ejea de los Caballeros ===
Polling firm/Commissioner	Fieldwork date	Sample size	Turnout	PSOE	PP	Así Ejea	United Left of Aragon	CS	CHA	PAR	Podemos	Vox	Lead
2023 municipal election	28 May 2023	—N/a	67.0	36.4; 7	18.2; 3	16.8; 3	9.1; 2	5.4; 1	4.8; 0	–	–	7.6; 1	18.2
A+M/Heraldo de Aragón	27 Mar–9 Apr 2023	400	68.3	46.4; 10/11	20.7; 4/5	6.8; 1	7.9; 1	2.6; 0	4.3; 0	1.3; 0	1.7; 0	6.8; 1	25.7
2019 municipal election	26 May 2019	—N/a	67.1	47.1; 10	17.7; 3	11.5; 2	7.4; 1	7.1; 1	3.3; 0	2.5; 0	2.4; 0	–	29.4

=== Fraga ===
Polling firm/Commissioner	Fieldwork date	Sample size	Turnout	PP	PSOE	ETXS	CS	Podemos	PAR	United Left of Aragon	Vox	Lead
2023 municipal election	28 May 2023	—N/a	55.8	47.4; 10	21.2; 4	14.1; 2	–	4.9; 0	–	–	9.4; 1	26.2
A+M/Heraldo de Aragón	27 Mar–9 Apr 2023	400	64.2	43.3; 9/10	24.4; 5	10.1; 2	2.7; 0	4.4; 0	4.1; 0	4.3; 0	5.2; 0/1	18.9
2019 municipal election	26 May 2019	—N/a	59.7	40.1; 8	24.1; 4	12.3; 2	7.3; 1	5.5; 1	5.0; 1	4.2; 0	–	16.0

=== Huesca ===
Color key:

Poll conducted after legal ban on opinion polls

Polling firm/Commissioner	Fieldwork date	Sample size	Turnout	PSOE	PP	CS	Podemos	Vox	CH	PAR	CHA	Lead
2023 municipal election	28 May 2023	—N/a	63.2	28.3; 10	36.1; 12	4.7; 0	1.9; 0	10.5; 3	4.5; 0	2.2; 0	4.4; 0	7.8
GAD3/RTVE–FORTA	2–27 May 2023	850	?	30.0; 9	36.0; 11/12	–	6.0; 1	10.0; 2/3	–	–	5.0; 1	6.0
A+M/Heraldo de Aragón	13–17 Apr 2023	600	66.3	37.4; 11/12	34.8; 10/11	3.8; 0	6.9; 2	6.4; 1/2	3.2; 0	2.2; 0	4.4; 0/1	2.6
A+M/Heraldo de Aragón	27 Sep–5 Oct 2022	600	67.5	35.3; 11	35.2; 10	3.2; 0	6.9; 2	6.4; 2	4.1; 0	3.1; 0	4.9; 0	0.1
A+M/Heraldo de Aragón	4–18 Apr 2022	600	68.3	34.9; 11	34.1; 10	4.5; 0	5.6; 1	6.3; 1	5.4; 1	3.2; 0	5.0; 1	0.8
A+M/Heraldo de Aragón	14–15 Apr 2021	600	67.0	35.4; 11	33.7; 10	3.5; 0	6.2; 1	7.6; 2	5.2; 1	2.8; 0	4.9; 0	1.7
2019 municipal election	26 May 2019	—N/a	63.6	33.4; 10	29.8; 9	10.8; 3	8.5; 2	5.2; 1	4.5; 0	3.2; 0	3.2; 0	3.6

=== Jaca ===
Polling firm/Commissioner	Fieldwork date	Sample size	Turnout	PSOE	PP	PAR	CHA	Podemos	CS	Vox	A	Lead
2023 municipal election	28 May 2023	—N/a	60.1	22.7; 5	25.6; 5	7.4; 1	11.7; 2	5.8; 1	2.3; 0	8.8; 1	12.3; 2	2.9
A+M/Heraldo de Aragón	27 Mar–9 Apr 2023	400	66.2	30.9; 5/6	24.7; 4/5	14.6; 2	14.9; 3	5.5; 0/1	2.3; 0	6.3; 1	–	6.2
2019 municipal election	26 May 2019	—N/a	62.7	32.7; 6	17.4; 3	17.0; 3	13.9; 2	6.1; 1	5.7; 1	5.9; 1	–	15.3

=== Monzón ===
Polling firm/Commissioner	Fieldwork date	Sample size	Turnout	PSOE	PP	PAR	CM	CS	Vox	Podemos	CHA	Lead
2023 municipal election	28 May 2023	—N/a	66.9	19.3; 3	54.1; 11	6.2; 1	9.5; 1	0.5; 0	6.5; 1	–	2.4; 0	34.8
A+M/Heraldo de Aragón	27 Mar–9 Apr 2023	400	67.9	32.1; 6	29.7; 5/6	15.1; 3	9.1; 1/2	2.7; 0	5.8; 0/1	2.2; 0	2.4; 0	2.4
2019 municipal election	26 May 2019	—N/a	65.4	33.1; 6	23.8; 5	16.3; 3	9.9; 2	6.1; 1	4.4; 0	3.0; 0	2.6; 0	9.3

=== Tarazona ===
Polling firm/Commissioner	Fieldwork date	Sample size	Turnout	PP	PSOE	TP	CS	Podemos	PAR	Vox	Lead
2023 municipal election	28 May 2023	—N/a	68.3	45.0; 9	38.6; 7	7.2; 1	1.0; 0	2.5; 0	–	4.3; 0	6.4
A+M/Heraldo de Aragón	27 Mar–9 Apr 2023	400	71.8	43.1; 8/9	35.3; 7/8	9.7; 1/2	2.7; 0	3.3; 0	2.6; 0	2.4; 0	7.8
2019 municipal election	26 May 2019	—N/a	70.0	41.3; 8	32.9; 7	9.1; 1	5.1; 1	4.8; 0	3.7; 0	2.1; 0	8.4

=== Teruel ===
Color key:

Poll conducted after legal ban on opinion polls

Polling firm/Commissioner	Fieldwork date	Sample size	Turnout	PP	PSOE	CS	PAR	Vox	CHA	GT	Podemos	TE	Lead
2023 municipal election	28 May 2023	—N/a	67.8	41.9; 11	13.3; 3	1.5; 0	2.7; 0	10.7; 2	2.5; 0	4.6; 0	1.0; 0	20.4; 5	21.5
GAD3/RTVE–FORTA	2–27 May 2023	850	?	36.0; 9/10	18.0; 4	–	–	8.0; 2	–	–	–	22.0; 5/6	14.0
A+M/Heraldo de Aragón	14–18 Apr 2023	600	67.7	39.1; 10/11	25.3; 6/7	3.4; 0	6.2; 1/2	4.6; 0/1	7.3; 1/2	5.1; 1	3.5; 0	4.9; 0/1	13.8
A+M/Heraldo de Aragón	27 Sep–5 Oct 2022	600	67.4	41.9; 11	14.0; 3	3.2; 0	8.9; 2	6.2; 1	5.5; 1	4.7; 0	4.0; 0	11.0; 3	27.9
A+M/Heraldo de Aragón	4–18 Apr 2022	600	67.6	33.2; 9	20.7; 5	4.0; 0	8.1; 2	8.3; 2	6.6; 1	4.6; 0	1.0; 0	10.6; 2	12.5
A+M/Heraldo de Aragón	12–13 Apr 2021	600	?	34.8; 9	23.6; 6	4.3; 0	9.2; 2	9.5; 2	7.3; 1	5.6; 1	4.6; 0	–	11.2
2019 municipal election	26 May 2019	—N/a	64.4	30.7; 7	23.1; 5	14.0; 3	9.5; 2	5.5; 1	5.4; 1	5.4; 1	5.1; 1	–	7.6

=== Utebo ===
Polling firm/Commissioner	Fieldwork date	Sample size	Turnout	PSOE	PP	CS	United Left of Aragon	FIA	Vox	Podemos	PAR	CHA	Lead
2023 municipal election	28 May 2023	—N/a	64.1	24.2; 4	34.9; 7	1.2; 0	9.8; 2	10.9; 2	11.4; 2	1.4; 0	1.9; 0	2.7; 0	10.7
A+M/Heraldo de Aragón	27 Mar–9 Apr 2023	400	62.6	31.3; 6/7	28.1; 6/7	3.3; 0	10.1; 2	7.5; 1	7.8; 1	2.6; 0	2.8; 0	4.2; 0	3.2
2019 municipal election	26 May 2019	—N/a	59.4	33.2; 7	16.5; 3	13.8; 3	10.3; 2	8.2; 1	5.8; 1	4.7; 0	4.1; 0	2.6; 0	16.7
