= Opinion polling for the 2015 Spanish local elections (La Rioja) =

In the run up to the 2015 Spanish local elections, various organisations carried out opinion polling to gauge voting intention in local entities in Spain. Results of such polls for municipalities in La Rioja are displayed in this article. The date range for these opinion polls is from the previous local elections, held on 22 May 2011, to the day the next elections were held, on 24 May 2015.

Polls are listed in reverse chronological order, showing the most recent first and using the dates when the survey fieldwork was done, as opposed to the date of publication. Where the fieldwork dates are unknown, the date of publication is given instead. The highest percentage figure in each polling survey is displayed with its background shaded in the leading party's colour. If a tie ensues, this is applied to the figures with the highest percentages. The "Lead" columns on the right shows the percentage-point difference between the parties with the highest percentages in a given poll.

== Municipalities ==
=== Logroño ===
| Polling firm/Commissioner | Fieldwork date | Sample size | Turnout | PP | PSOE | UPyD | IU | PR+ | Podemos | C's | Cambia Logroño | Lead |
|---|---|---|---|---|---|---|---|---|---|---|---|---|
| 2015 municipal election | 24 May 2015 | —N/a | 68.5 | 35.8; 11 | 24.5; 7 | 1.8; 0 | (Note: Within Cambia Logroño.) | 5.4; 1 | | 14.1; 4 | 15.6; 4 | 11.3 |
| GAD3/Diario La Rioja | 6–12 May 2015 | 600 | ? | 40.8; 13 | 23.7; 7 | 1.3; 0 | | 3.6; 0 | | 10.7; 3 | 14.4; 4 | 17.1 |
| Gimeno 111/Rioja2 | 6–28 Apr 2015 | 400 | ? | 33.8; 10/12 | 20.5; 6/7 | 1.5; 0 | | 5.6; 1/2 | | 16.5; 4/5 | 17.6; 4/5 | 13.3 |
| GAD3/Diario La Rioja | 19–27 Jan 2015 | 600 | ? | 41.9; 14/15 | 22.2; 7 | 3.6; 0 | 4.7; 0/1 | 4.9; 0/1 | 11.2; 3 | 5.0; 1 | – | 19.7 |
| GAD3/ABC | 17–28 Mar 2014 | ? | ? | ? 15 | ? 8 | ? 2 | ? 2 | – | – | – | – | ? |
| 2011 municipal election | 22 May 2011 | —N/a | 68.5 | 48.5; 17 | 29.7; 10 | 4.5; 0 | 4.3; 0 | 4.0; 0 | – | – | – | 18.8 |
