= Opinion polling for the 2015 Spanish local elections (Navarre) =

In the run up to the 2015 Spanish local elections, various organisations carried out opinion polling to gauge voting intention in local entities in Spain. Results of such polls for municipalities in Navarre are displayed in this article. The date range for these opinion polls is from the previous local elections, held on 22 May 2011, to the day the next elections were held, on 24 May 2015.

Polls are listed in reverse chronological order, showing the most recent first and using the dates when the survey fieldwork was done, as opposed to the date of publication. Where the fieldwork dates are unknown, the date of publication is given instead. The highest percentage figure in each polling survey is displayed with its background shaded in the leading party's colour. If a tie ensues, this is applied to the figures with the highest percentages. The "Lead" columns on the right shows the percentage-point difference between the parties with the highest percentages in a given poll.

== Municipalities ==
=== Pamplona ===
Polling firm/Commissioner	Fieldwork date	Sample size	Turnout	UPN	GBai	PSN–PSOE	EH Bildu	PP	I–E	A	C's	Lead
2015 municipal election	24 May 2015	—N/a	69.4	31.0; 10	15.7; 5	10.0; 3	16.6; 5	3.8; 0	5.7; 1	9.5; 3	3.6; 0	14.4
CIES/Diario de Navarra	5–7 May 2015	340	?	30.4; 9/10	17.2; 5/6	9.3; 2/3	11.2; 3	5.4; 0/1	4.8; 0/1	12.2; 3/4	7.5; 2	13.2
Gizaker/Grupo Noticias	9–11 Mar 2015	440	76.9	27.7; 9	17.0; 6	10.9; 3	16.8; 5	3.3; 0	4.1; 0	13.9; 4	2.6; 0	10.7
Torrene Consulting/Gara	13–31 Oct 2014	?	63.8	25.0; 8	14.3; 4	9.5; 3	20.2; 6	5.9; 1/2	4.8; 0/1	14.3; 4	–	4.8
2011 municipal election	22 May 2011	—N/a	66.9	35.8; 11	22.6; 7	11.7; 3	10.9; 3	6.7; 2	5.3; 1	–	–	13.2
