= 2003 Spanish local elections in Aragon =

This article presents the results breakdown of the local elections held in Aragon on 25 May 2003. The following tables show detailed results in the autonomous community's most populous municipalities, sorted alphabetically.

== City control ==
The following table lists party control in the most populous municipalities, including provincial capitals (highlighted in bold). Gains for a party are highlighted in that party's colour.

Municipality	Population	Previous control	New control
Calatayud	18,531	People's Party (PP)	People's Party (PP)
**Huesca**	46,462	Spanish Socialist Workers' Party (PSOE)	Spanish Socialist Workers' Party (PSOE)
**Teruel**	31,506	People's Party (PP)	Spanish Socialist Workers' Party (PSOE)
**Zaragoza**	620,419	People's Party (PP)	Spanish Socialist Workers' Party (PSOE)

== Municipalities ==
=== Calatayud ===
Population: 18,531

← Summary of the 25 May 2003 City Council of Calatayud election results →
Parties and alliances	Popular vote			Seats	
Parties and alliances	Votes	%	±pp	Total	+/−
People's Party (PP)	5,678	55.69	−14.37	**11**	−2
Spanish Socialist Workers' Party (PSOE)	2,509	24.61	+8.30	**4**	+1
Aragonese Union (CHA)	1,171	11.48	+6.46	**2**	+1
Aragonese Party (PAR)	439	4.31	+1.22	0	±0
United Left of Aragon (IU)	179	1.76	−1.98	0	±0
Blank ballots	220	2.16	+0.38		
**Total**	**10,196**			**17**	**±0**
Valid votes	10,196	98.40	−0.83		
Invalid votes	166	1.60	+0.83		
**Votes cast / turnout**	**10,362**	**71.53**	**+2.55**		
Abstentions	4,124	28.47	−2.55		
**Registered voters**	**14,486**				

=== Huesca ===
Population: 46,462

← Summary of the 25 May 2003 City Council of Huesca election results →
Parties and alliances	Popular vote			Seats	
Parties and alliances	Votes	%	±pp	Total	+/−
Spanish Socialist Workers' Party (PSOE)	11,818	47.94	+16.93	**12**	+5
People's Party (PP)	6,765	27.44	−2.80	**6**	−1
Aragonese Union (CHA)	2,430	9.86	−4.35	**2**	−1
Aragonese Party (PAR)	1,932	7.84	−5.67	**1**	−2
United Left–The Greens (IU–LV)	1,011	4.10	−1.08	0	−1
Family and Life Party (PFyV)	58	0.24	New	0	±0
Aragonese Initiative (INAR)	53	0.22	New	0	±0
Blank ballots	583	2.37	−1.67		
**Total**	**24,650**			**21**	**±0**
Valid votes	24,650	99.16	+0.19		
Invalid votes	210	0.84	−0.19		
**Votes cast / turnout**	**24,860**	**64.56**	**+6.90**		
Abstentions	13,649	35.44	−6.90		
**Registered voters**	**38,509**				

=== Teruel ===
Population: 31,506

← Summary of the 25 May 2003 City Council of Teruel election results →
Parties and alliances	Popular vote			Seats	
Parties and alliances	Votes	%	±pp	Total	+/−
People's Party (PP)	6,239	36.58	−2.67	**8**	−1
Spanish Socialist Workers' Party (PSOE)	5,695	33.39	+7.15	**8**	+2
Aragonese Party (PAR)	2,801	16.42	−2.08	**4**	±0
Aragonese Union (CHA)	1,166	6.84	+0.15	**1**	±0
United Left of Aragon (IU)	688	4.03	−1.61	0	−1
Family and Life Party (PFyV)	37	0.22	New	0	±0
Humanist Party (PH)	27	0.16	−0.19	0	±0
Aragonese Initiative (INAR)	21	0.12	New	0	±0
Blank ballots	383	2.25	−1.07		
**Total**	**17,057**			**21**	**±0**
Valid votes	17,057	99.05	−0.19		
Invalid votes	164	0.95	+0.08		
**Votes cast / turnout**	**17,221**	**68.39**	**+8.04**		
Abstentions	7,960	31.61	−8.04		
**Registered voters**	**25,181**				

=== Zaragoza ===
Population: 620,419

== See also ==
- 2003 Aragonese regional election
