= 2007 Spanish local elections in La Rioja =

This article presents the results breakdown of the local elections held in La Rioja on 27 May 2007. The following tables show detailed results in the autonomous community's most populous municipalities, sorted alphabetically.

== City control ==
The following table lists party control in the most populous municipalities, including provincial capitals (shown in bold). Gains for a party are displayed with the cell's background shaded in that party's colour.

Municipality	Population	Previous control	New control
**Logroño**	147,036	People's Party (PP)	Spanish Socialist Workers' Party (PSOE)

== Municipalities ==
=== Logroño ===
Population: 147,036

← Summary of the 27 May 2007 City Council of Logroño election results →
Parties and alliances	Popular vote			Seats	
Parties and alliances	Votes	%	±pp	Total	+/−
People's Party (PP)	34,513	46.43	+0.24	**13**	−1
Spanish Socialist Workers' Party (PSOE)	29,983	40.34	+2.10	**12**	+1
Riojan Party (PR)	4,978	6.70	−0.25	**2**	±0
United Left–Citizen Initiative–The Greens (IZQ)^{1}	3,347	4.50	−1.74	0	±0
Blank ballots	1,512	2.03	−0.35		
**Total**	**74,333**			**27**	**±0**
Valid votes	74,333	99.32	−0.04		
Invalid votes	509	0.68	+0.04		
**Votes cast / turnout**	**74,842**	**67.50**	**−2.37**		
Abstentions	36,030	32.50	+2.37		
**Registered voters**	**110,872**				
Sources
Footnotes: ^{1} United Left–Citizen Initiative–The Greens results are compared to the combined totals of United Left and Citizen Initiative–The Greens in the 2003 election.

== See also ==
- 2007 Riojan regional election
