= 2007 Spanish local elections in Aragon =

This article presents the results breakdown of the local elections held in Aragon on 27 May 2007. The following tables show detailed results in the autonomous community's most populous municipalities, sorted alphabetically.

== City control ==
The following table lists party control in the most populous municipalities, including provincial capitals (shown in bold). Gains for a party are displayed with the cell's background shaded in that party's colour.

Municipality	Population	Previous control	New control
Calatayud	20,001	People's Party (PP)	Spanish Socialist Workers' Party (PSOE)
**Huesca**	49,312	Spanish Socialist Workers' Party (PSOE)	Spanish Socialist Workers' Party (PSOE)
**Teruel**	33,673	Spanish Socialist Workers' Party (PSOE)	Aragonese Party (PAR) (PP in 2010)
**Zaragoza**	646,546	Spanish Socialist Workers' Party (PSOE)	Spanish Socialist Workers' Party (PSOE)

== Municipalities ==
=== Calatayud ===
Population: 20,001

← Summary of the 27 May 2007 City Council of Calatayud election results →
Parties and alliances	Popular vote			Seats	
Parties and alliances	Votes	%	±pp	Total	+/−
People's Party (PP)	4,309	42.84	−12.85	**9**	−2
Spanish Socialist Workers' Party (PSOE)	2,660	26.45	+1.84	**6**	+2
Aragonese Party (PAR)	1,777	17.67	+13.36	**4**	+4
Aragonese Union (CHA)	938	9.33	−2.15	**2**	±0
United Left of Aragon (IU)	138	1.37	−0.39	0	±0
Blank ballots	236	2.35	+0.19		
**Total**	**10,058**			**21**	**+4**
Valid votes	10,058	99.29	+0.89		
Invalid votes	72	0.71	−0.89		
**Votes cast / turnout**	**10,130**	**69.35**	**−2.18**		
Abstentions	4,478	30.65	+2.18		
**Registered voters**	**14,608**				

=== Huesca ===
Population: 49,312

← Summary of the 27 May 2007 City Council of Huesca election results →
Parties and alliances	Popular vote			Seats	
Parties and alliances	Votes	%	±pp	Total	+/−
Spanish Socialist Workers' Party (PSOE)	8,907	38.44	−9.50	**9**	−3
People's Party (PP)	7,459	32.19	+4.75	**7**	+1
Aragonese Union (CHA)	2,092	9.03	−0.83	**2**	±0
Aragonese Party (PAR)	1,906	8.23	+0.39	**2**	+1
United Left of Aragon (IU)	1,338	5.77	+1.67	**1**	+1
The Greens–Green Group (LV–GV)	753	3.25	New	0	±0
Family and Life Party (PFyV)	45	0.19	−0.05	0	±0
Blank ballots	672	2.90	+0.53		
**Total**	**23,172**			**21**	**±0**
Valid votes	23,172	99.34	+0.18		
Invalid votes	155	0.66	−0.18		
**Votes cast / turnout**	**23,327**	**60.45**	**−4.11**		
Abstentions	15,263	39.55	+4.11		
**Registered voters**	**38,590**				

=== Teruel ===
Population: 33,673

← Summary of the 27 May 2007 City Council of Teruel election results →
Parties and alliances	Popular vote			Seats	
Parties and alliances	Votes	%	±pp	Total	+/−
People's Party (PP)	5,909	35.58	−1.00	**8**	±0
Spanish Socialist Workers' Party (PSOE)	5,170	31.13	−2.26	**7**	−1
Aragonese Party (PAR)	2,741	16.51	+0.09	**4**	±0
Aragonese Union (CHA)	1,423	8.57	+1.73	**2**	+1
United Left of Aragon (IU)	806	4.85	+0.82	0	±0
Aragon United Citizens Party (pCUA)	115	0.69	New	0	±0
Family and Life Party (PFyV)	30	0.18	−0.04	0	±0
Blank ballots	413	2.49	+0.24		
**Total**	**16,607**			**21**	**±0**
Valid votes	16,607	99.03	−0.02		
Invalid votes	163	0.97	+0.02		
**Votes cast / turnout**	**16,770**	**63.94**	**−4.45**		
Abstentions	9,457	36.06	+4.45		
**Registered voters**	**26,227**				

=== Zaragoza ===
Population: 646,546

== See also ==
- 2007 Aragonese regional election
