= 1995 Spanish local elections in Aragon =

This article presents the results breakdown of the local elections held in Aragon on 28 May 1995. The following tables show detailed results in the autonomous community's most populous municipalities, sorted alphabetically.

== City control ==
The following table lists party control in the most populous municipalities, including provincial capitals (highlighted in bold). Gains for a party are highlighted in that party's colour.

Municipality	Population	Previous control	New control
Calatayud	17,300	Spanish Socialist Workers' Party (PSOE)	People's Party (PP)
**Huesca**	45,515	Spanish Socialist Workers' Party (PSOE)	Regionalist Aragonese Party (PAR) (PP in 1997)
**Teruel**	29,971	Regionalist Aragonese Party (PAR)	People's Party (PP)
**Zaragoza**	606,620	Spanish Socialist Workers' Party (PSOE)	People's Party (PP)

== Municipalities ==
=== Calatayud ===
Population: 17,300

← Summary of the 28 May 1995 City Council of Calatayud election results →
Parties and alliances	Popular vote			Seats	
Parties and alliances	Votes	%	±pp	Total	+/−
People's Party (PP)	4,918	48.75	+21.88	**10**	+5
Spanish Socialist Workers' Party (PSOE)	2,863	28.38	−26.85	**5**	−6
United Left of Aragon (IU)	725	7.19	+4.01	**1**	+1
Aragonese Party (PAR)	580	5.75	−1.74	**1**	±0
Aragonese Union (CHA)	412	4.08	+2.60	0	±0
Platform of Independents of Spain (PIE)	218	2.16	New	0	±0
Aragonese Unity (UA)	84	0.83	New	0	±0
Blank ballots	289	2.86	+1.92		
**Total**	**10,089**			**17**	**±0**
Valid votes	10,089	99.29	−0.26		
Invalid votes	72	0.71	+0.26		
**Votes cast / turnout**	**10,161**	**72.18**	**+3.74**		
Abstentions	3,916	27.82	−3.74		
**Registered voters**	**14,077**				

=== Huesca ===
Population: 45,515

← Summary of the 28 May 1995 City Council of Huesca election results →
Parties and alliances	Popular vote			Seats	
Parties and alliances	Votes	%	±pp	Total	+/−
People's Party (PP)	7,444	30.28	+6.65	**7**	+2
Aragonese Party (PAR)	7,252	29.50	+7.41	**6**	+1
Spanish Socialist Workers' Party (PSOE)	5,268	21.43	−11.86	**5**	−3
United Left of Aragon (IU)	2,271	9.24	+0.07	**2**	±0
Aragonese Union (CHA)	1,394	5.67	+2.00	**1**	+1
Platform of Independents of Spain (PIE)	501	2.04	New	0	±0
Democratic and Social Centre (CDS)	n/a	n/a	−6.73	0	−1
Blank ballots	453	1.84	+0.41		
**Total**	**24,583**			**21**	**±0**
Valid votes	24,583	99.26	−0.13		
Invalid votes	183	0.74	+0.13		
**Votes cast / turnout**	**24,766**	**68.08**	**+7.87**		
Abstentions	11,610	31.92	−7.87		
**Registered voters**	**36,376**				

=== Teruel ===
Population: 29,971

← Summary of the 28 May 1995 City Council of Teruel election results →
Parties and alliances	Popular vote			Seats	
Parties and alliances	Votes	%	±pp	Total	+/−
People's Party (PP)	7,144	45.27	+16.09	10	+3
Spanish Socialist Workers' Party (PSOE)	5,099	32.31	−2.72	7	−2
Aragonese Party (PAR)	1,497	9.49	−8.09	2	−2
United Left of Aragon (IU)	909	5.76	+3.09	1	+1
Aragonese Union (CHA)	821	5.20	−0.54	1	±0
Blank ballots	310	1.96	+0.61		
**Total**	**15,780**			21	**±0**
Valid votes	15,780	99.31	±0.00		
Invalid votes	110	0.69	±0.00		
**Votes cast / turnout**	**15,890**	**67.52**	**+5.26**		
Abstentions	7,643	32.48	−5.26		
**Registered voters**	**23,533**				

=== Zaragoza ===
Population: 606,620

== See also ==
- 1995 Aragonese regional election
