= Opinion polling for the 2015 Spanish local elections (Catalonia) =

In the run up to the 2015 Spanish local elections, various organisations carried out opinion polling to gauge voting intention in local entities in Spain. Results of such polls for municipalities in Catalonia are displayed in this article. The date range for these opinion polls is from the previous local elections, held on 22 May 2011, to the day the next elections were held, on 24 May 2015.

Polls are listed in reverse chronological order, showing the most recent first and using the dates when the survey fieldwork was done, as opposed to the date of publication. Where the fieldwork dates are unknown, the date of publication is given instead. The highest percentage figure in each polling survey is displayed with its background shaded in the leading party's colour. If a tie ensues, this is applied to the figures with the highest percentages. The "Lead" columns on the right shows the percentage-point difference between the parties with the highest percentages in a given poll.

== Municipalities ==
=== Badalona ===
Polling firm/Commissioner	Fieldwork date	Sample size	Turnout	PP	PSC	CiU	ICV–EUiA	ERC	CUP	C's	Podemos/Podem	GBC	Lead
2015 municipal election	24 May 2015	—N/a	57.5	34.2; 10	14.1; 4	7.9; 2	6.7; 2	11.0; 3	(Note: Within GBC.)	5.6; 1		17.5; 5	16.7
GESOP/El Periódico	13–14 May 2015	500	?	39.3; 12/13	19.9; 6	10.0; 3	6.0; 1/2	7.1; 2		4.8; 0/1		9.1; 2/3	19.4
Llorente & Cuenca	31 Oct 2014	?	?	? 9/10	? 7/8	? 2/4	? 2/4	? 1/2	? 1/2	–	? 2/3	–	?
CUP (Note: Undecided and/or abstentionists excluded.)	14–26 Jul 2014	400	64	17.4; 6	12.8; 3	8.9; 2	10.6; 3	17.4; 5	6.4; 1	7.1; 2	17.4; 5	–	Tie
2011 municipal election	22 May 2011	—N/a	52.1	33.5; 11	27.1; 9	12.5; 4	8.9; 3	3.7; 0	1.8; 0	1.2; 0	–	–	6.4

=== Girona ===
Color key:

Exit poll

Polling firm/Commissioner	Fieldwork date	Sample size	Turnout	CiU	PSC	PP	CUP	ICV–EUiA	ERC	C's	Lead
2015 municipal election	24 May 2015	—N/a	56.0	32.6; 10	14.5; 4	6.0; 1	14.9; 4	4.2; 0	15.2; 4	7.5; 2	17.4
TNS Demoscopia/RTVE–FORTA	24 May 2015	?	?	? 9/10	? 3/4	? 2/3	? 5/6	? 0/1	? 4/5	? 0/1	?
GESOP/El Periódico	8–9 May 2015	500	?	35.7; 10/11	15.7; 4	9.4; 2	13.0; 3/4	5.0; 0/1	11.0; 3	6.0; 1/2	20.0
PSC	11 Jun 2014	500	?	? 9/10	? 4/5	? 2/3	? 2/3	? 1/2	? 4	? 0/1	?
2011 municipal election	22 May 2011	—N/a	51.7	31.5; 10	23.4; 7	11.7; 3	9.3; 3	7.0; 2	5.0; 0	1.3; 0	8.1

=== Igualada ===
Polling firm/Commissioner	Fieldwork date	Sample size	Turnout	CiU	PSC	ERC	PP	ICV–EUiA	PxC	SI	CUP	Lead
2015 municipal election	24 May 2015	—N/a	59.0	45.6; 11	11.9; 3	15.0; 3	6.2; 1	6.3; 1	3.4; 0	0.7; 0	9.4; 2	30.6
Opinòmetre	17 Apr 2015	400	?	? 9/10	? 2/3	? 4/5	? 1	? 1	? 0	–	? 1	?
Ràdio Igualada	30 Mar–11 Apr 2015	200	?	40.0; 10/11	14.6; 3/4	15.1; 3/4	4.9; 0/1	5.9; 1	4.9; 0/1	0.5; 0	7.6; 1/2	24.9
2011 municipal election	22 May 2011	—N/a	57.7	41.2; 10	20.6; 5	9.0; 2	7.8; 2	6.4; 1	5.8; 1	3.0; 0	–	20.6

=== L'Hospitalet de Llobregat ===
Polling firm/Commissioner	Fieldwork date	Sample size	Turnout	PSC	PP	CiU	ICV–EUiA	PxC	ERC	C's	CUP	G	Lead
2015 municipal election	24 May 2015	—N/a	53.4	33.2; 11	9.9; 3	6.0; 1	10.2; 3	3.9; 0	9.0; 2	13.2; 4	5.1; 1	7.5; 2	20.0
GESOP/El Periódico	14 May 2015	500	?	37.4; 12	12.2; 3/4	7.2; 2	7.0; 2	6.1; 1/2	7.3; 2	13.5; 4	–	–	23.9
Llorente & Cuenca	31 Oct 2014	?	?	? 11/12	? 4/6	? 3/4	? 2/3	? 0	? 1/2	–	? 1/2	? 2/3	?
2011 municipal election	22 May 2011	—N/a	50.2	38.9; 13	18.6; 6	12.3; 4	8.9; 2	7.3; 2	2.7; 0	2.1; 0	0.6; 0	–	20.3

=== Lleida ===
Color key:

Exit poll

Polling firm/Commissioner	Fieldwork date	Sample size	Turnout	PSC	CiU	PP	ICV–EUiA	ERC	CUP	C's	Comú	Lead
2015 municipal election	24 May 2015	—N/a	54.5	24.7; 8	17.9; 6	8.7; 2	4.8; 0	11.3; 3	8.8; 2	11.9; 4	7.6; 2	6.8
TNS Demoscopia/RTVE–FORTA	24 May 2015	?	?	? 8/10	? 4/5	? 4/5	? 0/1	? 3/4	? 2/3	? 2/3	? 0/1	?
GESOP/El Periódico	9–11 May 2015	500	?	34.8; 11/12	13.5; 4	12.4; 4	5.0; 0/1	11.5; 3/4	5.4; 1	10.0; 3	3.2; 0	21.3
Infortécnica/UA1 Ràdio	Apr 2015	415	?	47.4; 13/15	15.3; 4/5	8.1; 2/3	3.4; 0	8.2; 2/3	4.4; 0	13.3; 3/4	–	32.1
Infortécnica/UA1 Ràdio	Nov 2014	400	?	42.3; 12/14	17.1; 5	13.0; 4/5	4.9; 0/2	9.6; 3/4	6.5; 2	–	–	25.2
Infortécnica/UA1 Ràdio	Apr 2014	302	?	42.9; 13/14	18.8; 5/6	12.4; 3/4	5.5; 0/2	8.2; 2/3	5.4; 0/2	–	–	24.1
Infortécnica/UA1 Ràdio	Oct 2013	305	?	45.1; 12/14	15.0; 4/5	11.3; 3/4	9.8; 2/3	11.3; 2/3	? 0/2	? 0/2	–	30.1
2011 municipal election	22 May 2011	—N/a	49.8	42.1; 15	18.3; 6	16.5; 6	4.6; 0	4.2; 0	3.3; 0	1.0; 0	–	23.8

=== Mollet del Vallès ===
Polling firm/Commissioner	Fieldwork date	Sample size	Turnout	PSC	PP	CiU	ICV–EUiA	ERC	CUP	C's	Podemos/Podem	CM	Lead
2015 municipal election	24 May 2015	—N/a	55.3	26.4; 7	6.5; 1	7.9; 2	(Note: Within Canviem Mollet.)	16.7; 5	3.4; 5	11.2; 3		24.0; 7	2.4
Opinòmetre/somMollet	Jan 2015	400	?	? 6/7	? 2	? 3	? 2	? 5/6	? 2	–	? 3/4	–	?
Opinòmetre/somMollet	14 Feb 2014	400	?	? 9	? 2/3	? 3/4	? 5	? 4	? 0/1	? 0/1	–	–	?
2011 municipal election	22 May 2011	—N/a	48.2	35.4; 12	13.9; 4	13.1; 4	11.7; 3	7.6; 2	2.8 (Note: Results for IxM.); 0	2.2; 0	–	–	21.5

=== Palafolls ===
Polling firm/Commissioner	Fieldwork date	Sample size	Turnout	PSC	PP	ERC	CiU	ICV–EUiA	C's	Podemos/Podem	Lead
2015 municipal election	24 May 2015	—N/a	57.3	38.0; 6	9.5; 1	29.1; 4	5.8; 0	8.5; 1	7.5; 1	–	8.9
Infortécnica	11–15 May 2015	346	?	50.2; 6/7	10.0; 1/2	14.5; 2/3	9.5; 1/2	4.2; 0/1	8.9; 1/2	–	35.7
Infortécnica	Mar 2015	351	?	35.0; 5/6	10.6; 1/2	15.0; 2/3	16.2; 2/3	4.4; 0/1	5.6; 0/1	12.9; 0/2	18.8
2011 municipal election	22 May 2011	—N/a	54.9	44.1; 6	14.6; 2	13.5; 2	13.0; 2	6.6; 1	–	–	29.5

=== Sabadell ===
Polling firm/Commissioner	Fieldwork date	Sample size	Turnout	PSC	CiU	ICV–EUiA	PP	CAV	ERC	CpSBD	C's	UPCS	GS	Lead
2015 municipal election	24 May 2015	—N/a	55.1	15.4; 5	13.2; 4	(Note: Within UPCS.)	5.7; 1	(Note: Within CpSBD.)	14.8; 4	13.2; 4	12.0; 3	15.0; 4	6.4; 2	0.4
Opinòmetre/ERC	25–31 Mar 2015	600	?	? 6/7	? 4/5		? 2/3		? 5/6	? 2/3	? 2/3	? 4/5	–	?
2011 municipal election	22 May 2011	—N/a	50.2	38.3; 13	16.9; 5	11.5; 4	10.3; 3	7.2; 2	3.2; 0	3.1 (Note: Results for CUP.); 0	1.7; 0	–	–	21.4

=== Sant Feliu de Llobregat ===
Polling firm/Commissioner	Fieldwork date	Sample size	Turnout	ICV–EUiA	PSC	CiU	PP	ERC	C's	JSF	VxSF	Lead
2015 municipal election	24 May 2015	—N/a	58.3	23.7; 6	19.3; 4	10.0; 2	7.6; 1	12.7; 3	10.7; 2	6.6; 1	7.7; 2	4.4
GESOP/City Council of Sant Feliu	2–6 Jun 2014	800	?	26.0– 27.0; 6/7	14.0– 15.0; 3/4	12.5– 13.5; 3	11.5– 12.5; 3	14.0– 15.0; 3/4	7.0– 8.0; 1/2	6.0– 7.0; 1	–	12.0
2011 municipal election	22 May 2011	—N/a	52.5	26.8; 7	25.6; 6	17.3; 4	14.8; 4	4.5; 0	2.7; 0	–	–	1.2

=== Santa Coloma de Gramenet ===
Polling firm/Commissioner	Fieldwork date	Sample size	Turnout	PSC	PP	ICV–EUiA	PxC	SG	CiU	C's	ERC	CUP	Lead
2015 municipal election	24 May 2015	—N/a	54.0	40.7; 14	7.8; 2	7.9; 2	3.4; 0	18.6; 6	3.6; 0	11.5; 3	4.8; 0	(Note: Within SG.)	22.1
GESOP/El Periódico	12–13 May 2015	500	?	42.7; 13/14	9.3; 3	6.7; 2	–	15.2; 4/5	4.0; 0	12.0; 3/4	4.0; 0		27.5
Llorente & Cuenca	31 Oct 2014	?	?	? 10/11	? 4/5	? 3/4	? 0	? 2/3	? 1/2	–	? 1/2	? 1/2	?
2011 municipal election	22 May 2011	—N/a	49.7	39.2; 12	17.2; 5	11.9; 3	9.1; 3	6.6 (Note: Results for GG.); 2	6.6; 2	2.0; 0	1.6; 0	–	22.0

=== Sitges ===
Polling firm/Commissioner	Fieldwork date	Sample size	Turnout	PSC	CiU	PP	SGI	NH	CUP	ICV–EUiA	ERC	C's	MES	Podemos/Podem	Lead
2015 municipal election	24 May 2015	—N/a	56.2	13.3; 3	19.2; 5	6.5; 1	7.0; 1	9.2; 2	10.6; 3	2.0; 0	10.7; 3	10.8; 3	4.0; 0	–	5.9
iPolitics/CiU	4–24 Feb 2015	700	?	? 3/4	? 5	? 2	? 2	? 1/2	? 2	–	? 2/3	? 1	? 0/1	? 1	?
2011 municipal election	22 May 2011	—N/a	55.1	24.5; 7	21.6; 6	13.6; 3	7.5; 2	7.1; 2	6.3; 1	4.8; 0	4.3; 0	1.2; 0	–	–	2.9

=== Tarragona ===
Color key:

Exit poll

Polling firm/Commissioner	Fieldwork date	Sample size	Turnout	PSC	CiU	PP	ICV–EUiA	ERC	CUP	C's	G	Lead
2015 municipal election	24 May 2015	—N/a	56.3	28.5; 9	10.9; 3	11.5; 4	5.6; 1	11.7; 4	8.2; 2	14.3; 4	2.3; 0	14.2
TNS Demoscopia/RTVE–FORTA	24 May 2015	?	?	? 9/11	? 4/5	? 4	? 0/1	? 2/3	? 2/3	? 3/4	? 0/1	?
GESOP/El Periódico	11–12 May 2015	500	?	30.8; 9/10	15.6; 4/5	12.7; 3/4	7.1; 2	9.8; 2/3	5.2; 0/1	14.5; 4/5	–	15.2
2011 municipal election	22 May 2011	—N/a	54.2	36.9; 12	20.6; 7	20.6; 7	5.4; 1	4.0; 0	2.3; 0	1.7; 0	–	16.3

=== Vic ===
Polling firm/Commissioner	Fieldwork date	Sample size	Turnout	CiU	PxC	CV	PSC	ERC	ICV–EUiA	SI	PLVI	Lead
2015 municipal election	24 May 2015	—N/a	56.8	35.4; 9	0.7; 0	16.9; 4	6.7; 1	20.8; 5	5.1; 1	1.9; 0	5.6; 1	14.6
CiU	31 Mar 2015	800	?	? 8/10	–	? 5	? 1/2	? 4	–	? 0/1	–	?
2011 municipal election	22 May 2011	—N/a	60.2	33.4; 8	19.9; 5	10.8; 2	8.8; 2	8.6; 2	5.7; 1	5.4; 1	–	13.5
