= 1999 Spanish local elections in Aragon =

This article presents the results breakdown of the local elections held in Aragon on 13 June 1999. The following tables show detailed results in the autonomous community's most populous municipalities, sorted alphabetically.

== City control ==
The following table lists party control in the most populous municipalities, including provincial capitals (highlighted in bold). Gains for a party are highlighted in that party's colour.

Municipality	Population	Previous control	New control
Calatayud	16,569	People's Party (PP)	People's Party (PP)
**Huesca**	45,485	People's Party (PP)	Spanish Socialist Workers' Party (PSOE)
**Teruel**	29,320	People's Party (PP)	People's Party (PP)
**Zaragoza**	603,367	People's Party (PP)	People's Party (PP)

== Municipalities ==
=== Calatayud ===
Population: 16,569

← Summary of the 13 June 1999 City Council of Calatayud election results →
Parties and alliances	Popular vote			Seats	
Parties and alliances	Votes	%	±pp	Total	+/−
People's Party (PP)	6,870	70.06	+21.31	**13**	+3
Spanish Socialist Workers' Party (PSOE)	1,599	16.31	−12.07	**3**	−2
Aragonese Union (CHA)	492	5.02	+0.94	**1**	+1
United Left of Aragon (IU)	367	3.74	−3.45	0	−1
Aragonese Party (PAR)	303	3.09	−2.66	0	−1
Blank ballots	175	1.78	−1.08		
**Total**	**9,806**			**17**	**±0**
Valid votes	9,806	99.23	−0.06		
Invalid votes	76	0.77	+0.06		
**Votes cast / turnout**	**9,882**	**68.98**	**−3.20**		
Abstentions	4,443	31.02	+3.20		
**Registered voters**	**14,325**				

=== Huesca ===
Population: 45,485

← Summary of the 13 June 1999 City Council of Huesca election results →
Parties and alliances	Popular vote			Seats	
Parties and alliances	Votes	%	±pp	Total	+/−
Spanish Socialist Workers' Party (PSOE)	6,808	31.01	+9.58	**7**	+2
People's Party (PP)	6,639	30.24	−0.04	**7**	±0
Aragonese Union (CHA)	3,119	14.21	+8.54	**3**	+2
Aragonese Party (PAR)	2,966	13.51	−15.99	**3**	−3
United Left of Aragon (IU)	1,138	5.18	−4.06	**1**	−1
Upper Aragonese Territory Regenerationist Group (ARTA)	362	1.65	New	0	±0
Humanist Party (PH)	34	0.15	New	0	±0
Blank ballots	888	4.04	+2.20		
**Total**	**21,954**			**21**	**±0**
Valid votes	21,954	98.97	−0.29		
Invalid votes	229	1.03	+0.29		
**Votes cast / turnout**	**22,183**	**57.66**	**−10.42**		
Abstentions	16,287	42.34	+10.42		
**Registered voters**	**38,470**				

=== Teruel ===
Population: 29,320

← Summary of the 13 June 1999 City Council of Teruel election results →
Parties and alliances	Popular vote			Seats	
Parties and alliances	Votes	%	±pp	Total	+/−
People's Party (PP)	5,813	39.25	−6.02	**9**	−1
Spanish Socialist Workers' Party (PSOE)	3,886	26.24	−6.07	**6**	−1
Aragonese Party (PAR)	2,740	18.50	+9.01	**4**	+2
Aragonese Union (CHA)	991	6.69	+1.49	**1**	±0
United Left of Aragon (IU)	835	5.64	−0.12	**1**	±0
Humanist Party (PH)	52	0.35	New	0	±0
Blank ballots	492	3.32	+1.36		
**Total**	**14,809**			**21**	**±0**
Valid votes	14,809	99.13	−0.18		
Invalid votes	130	0.87	+0.18		
**Votes cast / turnout**	**14,939**	**60.35**	**−7.17**		
Abstentions	9,816	39.65	+7.17		
**Registered voters**	**24,755**				

=== Zaragoza ===
Population: 603,367

== See also ==
- 1999 Aragonese regional election
