= 2003 Spanish local elections in La Rioja =

This article presents the results breakdown of the local elections held in La Rioja on 25 May 2003. The following tables show detailed results in the autonomous community's most populous municipalities, sorted alphabetically.

== City control ==
The following table lists party control in the most populous municipalities, including provincial capitals (highlighted in bold). Gains for a party are highlighted in that party's colour.

Municipality	Population	Previous control	New control
**Logroño**	136,841	People's Party (PP)	People's Party (PP)

== Municipalities ==
=== Logroño ===
Population: 136,841

← Summary of the 25 May 2003 City Council of Logroño election results →
Parties and alliances	Popular vote			Seats	
Parties and alliances	Votes	%	±pp	Total	+/−
People's Party (PP)	35,130	46.19	−5.77	**14**	−1
Spanish Socialist Workers' Party (PSOE)	29,084	38.24	+5.07	**11**	+1
Riojan Party (PR)	5,288	6.95	+1.69	**2**	+1
United Left (IU)	2,567	3.38	−2.20	0	−1
Citizen Initiative–The Greens (IC–LV)	2,175	2.86	New	0	±0
Blank ballots	1,807	2.38	−0.97		
**Total**	**76,051**			**27**	**±0**
Valid votes	76,051	99.36	+0.09		
Invalid votes	492	0.64	−0.09		
**Votes cast / turnout**	**76,543**	**69.87**	**+9.20**		
Abstentions	33,004	30.13	−9.20		
**Registered voters**	**109,547**				

== See also ==
- 2003 Riojan regional election
