= 2011 Spanish local elections in Aragon =

This article presents the results breakdown of the local elections held in Aragon on 22 May 2011. The following tables show detailed results in the autonomous community's most populous municipalities, sorted alphabetically.

== City control ==
The following table lists party control in the most populous municipalities, including provincial capitals (shown in bold). Gains for a party are displayed with the cell's background shaded in that party's colour.

Municipality	Population	Previous control	New control
Calatayud	21,717	Spanish Socialist Workers' Party (PSOE)	People's Party (PP)
**Huesca**	52,347	Spanish Socialist Workers' Party (PSOE)	People's Party (PP)
**Teruel**	35,241	People's Party (PP)	People's Party (PP)
**Zaragoza**	675,121	Spanish Socialist Workers' Party (PSOE)	Spanish Socialist Workers' Party (PSOE)

== Municipalities ==
=== Calatayud ===
Population: 21,717

← Summary of the 22 May 2011 City Council of Calatayud election results →
Parties and alliances	Popular vote			Seats	
Parties and alliances	Votes	%	±pp	Total	+/−
People's Party (PP)	4,758	47.68	+4.84	**12**	+3
Spanish Socialist Workers' Party (PSOE)	2,457	24.62	−1.83	**6**	±0
Aragonese Party (PAR)	1,494	14.97	−2.70	**3**	−1
Aragonese Union (CHA)	473	4.74	−4.59	0	−2
United Left of Aragon (IU)	206	2.06	+0.69	0	±0
Union, Progress and Democracy (UPyD)	140	1.40	New	0	±0
Federation of Independents of Aragon (FIA)	134	1.34	New	0	±0
Blank ballots	316	3.17	+0.82		
**Total**	**9,978**			**21**	**±0**
Valid votes	9,978	98.52	−0.77		
Invalid votes	150	1.48	+0.77		
**Votes cast / turnout**	**10,128**	**69.45**	**+0.10**		
Abstentions	4,455	30.55	−0.10		
**Registered voters**	**14,583**				

=== Huesca ===
Population: 52,347

← Summary of the 22 May 2011 City Council of Huesca election results →
Parties and alliances	Popular vote			Seats	
Parties and alliances	Votes	%	±pp	Total	+/−
People's Party (PP)	9,164	38.06	+5.87	**11**	+4
Spanish Socialist Workers' Party (PSOE)	7,583	31.50	−6.94	**9**	±0
Aragonese Party (PAR)	1,653	6.87	−1.36	**2**	±0
Aragonese Union (CHA)	1,632	6.78	−2.25	**2**	±0
United Left of Aragon (IU)	1,558	6.47	+0.70	**1**	±0
Greens–Ecolo (V–Ecolo)	914	3.80	New	0	±0
Union, Progress and Democracy (UPyD)	564	2.34	New	0	±0
Spanish Alternative (AES)	183	0.76	New	0	±0
Communist Unification of Spain (UCE)	15	0.06	New	0	±0
Blank ballots	809	3.36	+0.46		
**Total**	**24,075**			**25**	**+4**
Valid votes	24,075	98.34	−1.00		
Invalid votes	407	1.66	+1.00		
**Votes cast / turnout**	**24,482**	**63.79**	**+3.34**		
Abstentions	13,897	36.21	−3.34		
**Registered voters**	**38,379**				

=== Teruel ===
Population: 35,241

← Summary of the 22 May 2011 City Council of Teruel election results →
Parties and alliances	Popular vote			Seats	
Parties and alliances	Votes	%	±pp	Total	+/−
People's Party (PP)	7,932	47.83	+12.25	**12**	+4
Spanish Socialist Workers' Party (PSOE)	3,461	20.87	−10.26	**5**	−2
Aragonese Union (CHA)	1,388	8.37	−0.20	**2**	±0
United Left of Aragon (IU)	1,174	7.08	+2.23	**1**	+1
Aragonese Party (PAR)	1,170	7.05	−9.46	**1**	−3
Commitment with Aragon (CCA)	445	2.68	New	0	±0
Union, Progress and Democracy (UPyD)	354	2.13	New	0	±0
Blank ballots	660	3.98	+1.49		
**Total**	**16,584**			**21**	**±0**
Valid votes	16,584	97.79	−0.93		
Invalid votes	375	2.21	+0.93		
**Votes cast / turnout**	**16,959**	**65.11**	**+1.17**		
Abstentions	9,089	34.89	−1.17		
**Registered voters**	**26,048**				

=== Zaragoza ===
Population: 675,121

== See also ==
- 2011 Aragonese regional election
