= 2015 Spanish local elections in La Rioja =

This article presents the results breakdown of the local elections held in La Rioja on 24 May 2015. The following tables show detailed results in the autonomous community's most populous municipalities, sorted alphabetically.

== City control ==
The following table lists party control in the most populous municipalities, including provincial capitals (shown in bold). Gains for a party are displayed with the cell's background shaded in that party's colour.

Municipality	Population	Previous control	New control
**Logroño**	151,962	People's Party (PP)	People's Party (PP)

== Municipalities ==
=== Logroño ===
Population: 151,962

← Summary of the 24 May 2015 City Council of Logroño election results →
Parties and alliances	Popular vote			Seats	
Parties and alliances	Votes	%	±pp	Total	+/−
People's Party (PP)	26,845	35.78	−12.76	**11**	−6
Spanish Socialist Workers' Party (PSOE)	18,412	24.54	−5.12	**7**	−3
Change Logroño (Cambia Logroño)^{1}	11,680	15.57	+11.31	**4**	+4
Citizens–Party of the Citizenry (C's)	10,552	14.06	New	**4**	+4
Riojan Party (PR+)	4,015	5.35	+1.37	**1**	+1
Union, Progress and Democracy (UPyD)	1,356	1.81	−2.71	0	±0
Communist Party of the Peoples of Spain (PCPE)	754	1.00	+0.64	0	±0
Blank ballots	1,411	1.88	−0.70		
**Total**	**75,025**			**27**	**±0**
Valid votes	75,025	98.28	+0.02		
Invalid votes	1,313	1.72	−0.02		
**Votes cast / turnout**	**76,338**	**68.49**	**−0.03**		
Abstentions	35,113	31.51	+0.03		
**Registered voters**	**111,451**				
Sources
Footnotes: ^{1} Change Logroño results are compared to United Left of La Rioja totals in the 2011 election.

== See also ==
- 2015 Riojan regional election
