= 2019 Spanish local elections in Aragon =

This article presents the results breakdown of the local elections held in Aragon on 26 May 2019. The following tables show detailed results in the autonomous community's most populous municipalities, sorted alphabetically.

== City control ==
The following table lists party control in the most populous municipalities, including provincial capitals (shown in bold). Gains for a party are displayed with the cell's background shaded in that party's colour.

Municipality	Population	Previous control	New control
Calatayud	20,035	People's Party (PP)	People's Party (PP)
**Huesca**	52,463	Spanish Socialist Workers' Party (PSOE)	Spanish Socialist Workers' Party (PSOE)
**Teruel**	35,691	People's Party (PP)	People's Party (PP)
**Zaragoza**	666,880	Zaragoza in Common (ZeC)	People's Party (PP)

== Municipalities ==
=== Calatayud ===
Population: 20,035

← Summary of the 26 May 2019 City Council of Calatayud election results →
Parties and alliances	Popular vote			Seats	
Parties and alliances	Votes	%	±pp	Total	+/−
People's Party (PP)	3,293	35.08	−1.40	**9**	±0
Spanish Socialist Workers' Party (PSOE)	2,603	27.73	+6.55	**7**	+2
Citizens–Party of the Citizenry (Cs)	1,332	14.19	+0.09	**3**	±0
Aragonese Party (PAR)	655	6.98	−4.87	**1**	−1
Vox (Vox)	518	5.52	New	**1**	+1
We Can–Equo (Podemos–Equo)^{1}	428	4.56	−0.81	0	−1
Aragonese Union (CHA)	343	3.65	−1.76	0	−1
Plural Calatayud (CP)	108	1.15	−1.81	0	±0
Blank ballots	106	1.13	−1.52		
**Total**	**9,386**			**21**	**±0**
Valid votes	9,386	98.95	+1.32		
Invalid votes	100	1.05	−1.32		
**Votes cast / turnout**	**9,486**	**65.49**	**−0.13**		
Abstentions	4,998	34.51	+0.13		
**Registered voters**	**14,484**				
Sources
Footnotes: ^{1} We Can–Equo results are compared to Aragon Can totals in the 2015 election.

=== Huesca ===
Population: 52,463

← Summary of the 26 May 2019 City Council of Huesca election results →
Parties and alliances	Popular vote			Seats	
Parties and alliances	Votes	%	±pp	Total	+/−
Spanish Socialist Workers' Party (PSOE)	8,355	33.37	+8.49	**10**	+2
People's Party (PP)	7,463	29.80	−1.14	**9**	±0
Citizens–Party of the Citizenry (Cs)	2,701	10.79	+1.65	**3**	+1
We Can–Equo (Podemos–Equo)^{1}	2,134	8.52	−0.23	**2**	±0
Vox (Vox)	1,310	5.23	New	**1**	+1
Changing Huesca (Cambiar Huesca)	1,119	4.47	−9.14	0	−4
Aragonese Party (PAR)	809	3.23	−1.03	0	±0
Aragonese Union (CHA)	803	3.21	−0.96	0	±0
Blank Seats (EB)	97	0.39	−0.54	0	±0
Blank ballots	249	0.99	−1.40		
**Total**	**25,040**			**25**	**±0**
Valid votes	25,040	99.36	+0.95		
Invalid votes	161	0.64	−0.95		
**Votes cast / turnout**	**25,201**	**63.60**	**−0.19**		
Abstentions	14,425	36.40	+0.19		
**Registered voters**	**39,626**				
Sources
Footnotes: ^{1} We Can–Equo results are compared to Aragon Can totals in the 2015 election.

=== Teruel ===
Population: 35,691

← Summary of the 26 May 2019 City Council of Teruel election results →
Parties and alliances	Popular vote			Seats	
Parties and alliances	Votes	%	±pp	Total	+/−
People's Party (PP)	5,321	30.70	−1.53	**7**	−1
Spanish Socialist Workers' Party (PSOE)	3,997	23.06	+3.26	**5**	±0
Citizens–Party of the Citizenry (Cs)	2,430	14.02	+4.51	**3**	+1
Aragonese Party (PAR)	1,655	9.55	−0.59	**2**	±0
Vox (Vox)	953	5.50	New	**1**	+1
Aragonese Union (CHA)	940	5.42	−2.11	**1**	±0
Winning Teruel–United Left (GT–IU)	934	5.39	−9.60	**1**	−2
We Can–Equo–Teruel Municipalist Space (Podemos–Equo–EMT)	880	5.08	New	**1**	+1
Blank Seats (EB)	43	0.25	−0.55	0	±0
Blank ballots	177	1.02	−1.57		
**Total**	**17,330**			**21**	**±0**
Valid votes	17,330	99.14	+1.64		
Invalid votes	150	0.86	−1.64		
**Votes cast / turnout**	**17,480**	**64.40**	**+0.45**		
Abstentions	9,664	35.60	−0.45		
**Registered voters**	**27,144**				

=== Zaragoza ===
Population: 666,880

== See also ==
- 2019 Aragonese regional election
