= 2011 Spanish local elections in La Rioja =

This article presents the results breakdown of the local elections held in La Rioja on 22 May 2011. The following tables show detailed results in the autonomous community's most populous municipalities, sorted alphabetically.

== City control ==
The following table lists party control in the most populous municipalities, including provincial capitals (shown in bold). Gains for a party are displayed with the cell's background shaded in that party's colour.

Municipality	Population	Previous control	New control
**Logroño**	152,650	Spanish Socialist Workers' Party (PSOE)	People's Party (PP)

== Municipalities ==
=== Logroño ===
Population: 152,650

← Summary of the 22 May 2011 City Council of Logroño election results →
Parties and alliances	Popular vote			Seats	
Parties and alliances	Votes	%	±pp	Total	+/−
People's Party (PP)	35,680	48.54	+2.11	**17**	+4
Spanish Socialist Workers' Party (PSOE)	21,801	29.66	−10.68	**10**	−2
Union, Progress and Democracy (UPyD)	3,323	4.52	New	0	±0
United Left of La Rioja (IU)	3,131	4.26	−0.24	0	±0
Riojan Party (PR)	2,924	3.98	−2.72	0	−2
Citizens of Logroño (Cñ)	2,604	3.54	New	0	±0
Greens of La Rioja–Ecolo (Ecolo–V)	1,061	1.44	New	0	±0
For a Fairer World (PUM+J)	357	0.49	New	0	±0
Anti-Bullfighting Party Against Mistreatment of Animals (PACMA)	310	0.42	New	0	±0
Communist Party of the Peoples of Spain (PCPE)	262	0.36	New	0	±0
Spanish Alternative (AES)	151	0.21	New	0	±0
Blank ballots	1,898	2.58	+0.55		
**Total**	**73,502**			**27**	**±0**
Valid votes	73,502	98.26	−1.06		
Invalid votes	1,302	1.74	+1.06		
**Votes cast / turnout**	**74,804**	**68.52**	**+1.02**		
Abstentions	34,371	31.48	−1.02		
**Registered voters**	**109,175**				

== See also ==
- 2011 Riojan regional election
