= 2023 Spanish local elections in Aragon =

This article presents the results breakdown of the local elections held in Aragon on 28 May 2023. The following tables show detailed results in the autonomous community's most populous municipalities, sorted alphabetically.

== City control ==
The following table lists party control in the most populous municipalities, including provincial capitals (shown in bold). Gains for a party are displayed with the cell's background shaded in that party's colour.

Municipality	Population	Previous control	New control
Calatayud	19,776	People's Party (PP)	People's Party (PP)
**Huesca**	53,305	Spanish Socialist Workers' Party (PSOE)	People's Party (PP)
**Teruel**	35,900	People's Party (PP)	People's Party (PP)
**Zaragoza**	673,010	People's Party (PP)	People's Party (PP)

== Municipalities ==
=== Calatayud ===
Population: 19,776

← Summary of the 28 May 2023 City Council of Calatayud election results →
Parties and alliances	Popular vote			Seats	
Parties and alliances	Votes	%	±pp	Total	+/−
People's Party (PP)	4,373	48.74	+13.66	**10**	+1
Spanish Socialist Workers' Party (PSOE)	2,422	26.99	−0.74	**5**	−2
Vox (Vox)	572	6.37	+0.85	**1**	±0
Citizens–You Aragon (CS–Tú Aragón)	472	5.26	−8.93	**1**	−2
Aragonese Union (CHA)	447	4.98	+1.33	0	±0
Aragonese Party (PAR)	355	3.96	−3.02	0	−1
United Left of Aragon (IU)^{1}	144	1.60	+0.45	0	±0
Blank ballots	188	2.10	+0.97		
**Total**	**8,973**			**17**	**−4**
Valid votes	8,973	97.53	−1.42		
Invalid votes	227	2.47	+1.42		
**Votes cast / turnout**	**9,200**	**64.58**	**−0.91**		
Abstentions	5,046	35.42	+0.91		
**Registered voters**	**14,246**				
Sources
Footnotes: ^{1} United Left of Aragon results are compared to Plural Calatayud totals in the 2019 election.

=== Huesca ===
Population: 53,305

← Summary of the 28 May 2023 City Council of Huesca election results →
Parties and alliances	Popular vote			Seats	
Parties and alliances	Votes	%	±pp	Total	+/−
People's Party (PP)	8,841	36.07	+6.27	**12**	+3
Spanish Socialist Workers' Party (PSOE)	6,938	28.31	−5.06	**10**	±0
Vox (Vox)	2,581	10.53	+5.30	**3**	+2
We Can–Green Alliance (Podemos–AV)	1,149	4.69	−3.83	0	−2
Changing Huesca (Cambiar Huesca)	1,098	4.48	+0.01	0	±0
Aragonese Union (CHA)	1,088	4.44	+1.23	0	±0
Greens Equo (Equo)	1,055	4.30	New	0	±0
Aragonese Party (PAR)	543	2.22	−1.01	0	±0
Citizens–You Aragon (CS–Tú Aragón)	454	1.85	−8.94	0	−3
Blank Seats to Leave Empty Seats (EB)	177	0.72	+0.33	0	±0
Federation of Independents of Aragon (FIA)	94	0.38	New	0	±0
Blank ballots	491	2.00	+1.01		
**Total**	**24,509**			**25**	**±0**
Valid votes	24,509	98.49	−0.87		
Invalid votes	375	1.51	+0.87		
**Votes cast / turnout**	**24,884**	**63.18**	**−0.42**		
Abstentions	14,499	36.82	+0.42		
**Registered voters**	**39,383**				

=== Teruel ===
Population: 35,900

← Summary of the 28 May 2023 City Council of Teruel election results →
Parties and alliances	Popular vote			Seats	
Parties and alliances	Votes	%	±pp	Total	+/−
People's Party (PP)	7,536	41.94	+11.24	**11**	+4
Teruel Exists–Exists Coalition (Existe)	3,673	20.44	New	**5**	+5
Spanish Socialist Workers' Party (PSOE)	2,396	13.34	−9.72	**3**	−2
Vox (Vox)	1,918	10.68	+5.18	**2**	+1
Winning Teruel–United Left (GT–IU)	819	4.56	−0.83	0	−1
Aragonese Party (PAR)	493	2.74	−6.81	0	−2
Aragonese Union (CHA)	455	2.53	−2.89	0	−1
Citizens–You Aragon (CS–Tú Aragón)	261	1.45	−12.57	0	−3
We Can–Green Alliance (Podemos–AV)	175	0.97	−4.11	0	−1
Blank ballots	241	1.34	+0.32		
**Total**	**17,967**			**21**	**±0**
Valid votes	17,967	98.48	−0.66		
Invalid votes	277	1.52	+0.66		
**Votes cast / turnout**	**18,244**	**67.79**	**+3.39**		
Abstentions	8,667	32.21	−3.39		
**Registered voters**	**26,911**				

=== Zaragoza ===
Population: 673,010

== See also ==
- 2023 Aragonese regional election
