= 2015 Spanish local elections in Aragon =

This article presents the results breakdown of the local elections held in Aragon on 24 May 2015. The following tables show detailed results in the autonomous community's most populous municipalities, sorted alphabetically.

== City control ==
The following table lists party control in the most populous municipalities, including provincial capitals (shown in bold). Gains for a party are displayed with the cell's background shaded in that party's colour.

Municipality	Population	Previous control	New control
Calatayud	20,658	People's Party (PP)	People's Party (PP)
**Huesca**	52,555	People's Party (PP)	Spanish Socialist Workers' Party (PSOE)
**Teruel**	35,675	People's Party (PP)	People's Party (PP)
**Zaragoza**	666,058	Spanish Socialist Workers' Party (PSOE)	Zaragoza in Common (ZeC)

== Municipalities ==
=== Calatayud ===
Population: 20,658

← Summary of the 24 May 2015 City Council of Calatayud election results →
Parties and alliances	Popular vote			Seats	
Parties and alliances	Votes	%	±pp	Total	+/−
People's Party (PP)	3,399	36.48	−11.20	**9**	−3
Spanish Socialist Workers' Party (PSOE)	1,973	21.18	−3.44	**5**	−1
Citizens–Party of the Citizenry (C's)	1,314	14.10	New	**3**	+3
Aragonese Party (PAR)	1,104	11.85	−3.12	**2**	−1
Aragonese Union (CHA)	504	5.41	+0.67	**1**	+1
Aragon Can (Aragón Sí Puede)	500	5.37	New	**1**	+1
Plural Calatayud (Calatayud Plural)^{1}	276	2.96	+0.90	0	±0
Blank ballots	247	2.65	−0.52		
**Total**	**9,317**			**21**	**±0**
Valid votes	9,317	97.63	−0.89		
Invalid votes	226	2.37	+0.89		
**Votes cast / turnout**	**9,543**	**65.62**	**−3.83**		
Abstentions	5,000	34.38	+3.83		
**Registered voters**	**14,543**				
Sources
Footnotes: ^{1} Plural Calatayud results are compared to United Left of Aragon totals in the 2011 election.

=== Huesca ===
Population: 52,555

← Summary of the 24 May 2015 City Council of Huesca election results →
Parties and alliances	Popular vote			Seats	
Parties and alliances	Votes	%	±pp	Total	+/−
People's Party (PP)	7,586	30.94	−7.12	**9**	−2
Spanish Socialist Workers' Party (PSOE)	6,101	24.88	−6.62	**8**	−1
Changing Huesca (Cambiar Huesca)^{1}	3,336	13.61	+7.14	**4**	+3
Citizens–Party of the Citizenry (C's)	2,242	9.14	New	**2**	+2
Aragon Can (Aragón Sí Puede)	2,145	8.75	New	**2**	+2
Aragonese Party (PAR)	1,044	4.26	−2.61	0	−2
Aragonese Union (CHA)	1,022	4.17	−2.61	0	−2
Blank Seats (EB)	229	0.93	New	0	±0
Union, Progress and Democracy (UPyD)	227	0.93	−1.41	0	±0
Blank ballots	585	2.39	−0.97		
**Total**	**24,517**			**25**	**±0**
Valid votes	24,517	98.41	+0.07		
Invalid votes	397	1.59	−0.07		
**Votes cast / turnout**	**24,914**	**63.79**	**±0.00**		
Abstentions	14,141	36.21	±0.00		
**Registered voters**	**39,055**				
Sources
Footnotes: ^{1} Changing Huesca results are compared to United Left of Aragon totals in the 2011 election.

=== Teruel ===
Population: 35,675

← Summary of the 24 May 2015 City Council of Teruel election results →
Parties and alliances	Popular vote			Seats	
Parties and alliances	Votes	%	±pp	Total	+/−
People's Party (PP)	5,356	32.23	−15.60	**8**	−4
Spanish Socialist Workers' Party (PSOE)	3,290	19.80	−1.07	**5**	±0
Winning Teruel (G:IU–LV)^{1}	2,492	14.99	+7.91	**3**	+2
Aragonese Party (PAR)	1,685	10.14	+3.09	**2**	+1
Citizens–Party of the Citizenry (C's)	1,581	9.51	New	**2**	+2
Aragonese Union (CHA)	1,252	7.53	−0.84	**1**	−1
Commitment with Aragon (CCA)	339	2.04	−0.64	0	±0
Blank Seats (EB)	133	0.80	New	0	±0
Federation of Independents of Aragon (FIA)	60	0.36	New	0	±0
Blank ballots	431	2.59	−1.39		
**Total**	**16,619**			**21**	**±0**
Valid votes	16,619	97.50	−0.29		
Invalid votes	427	2.50	+0.29		
**Votes cast / turnout**	**17,046**	**63.95**	**−1.16**		
Abstentions	9,611	36.05	+1.16		
**Registered voters**	**26,657**				
Sources
Footnotes: ^{1} Winning Teruel results are compared to United Left of Aragon totals in the 2011 election.

=== Zaragoza ===
Population: 666,058

== See also ==
- 2015 Aragonese regional election
