= 2015 Spanish local elections =

- 24 May 2015 (Note: By-elections were held on 27 September and 20 December 2015 in those constituencies where results were annulled by a final sentence following an electoral petition, or where elections were not held due to a lack of candidates.)

All 67,515 councillors in 8,122 municipal councils (Note: Including 50 seats in the assemblies of Ceuta and Melilla.) All 1,424 provincial/island seats in 44 provinces (Note: Including: 1,040 seats in 38 provincial deputations; 155 seats in 7 Canarian island cabildos; 153 seats in 3 Basque foral deputations; 76 seats in 4 Balearic island councils.)
- Opinion polls
- Registered: 35,099,122 ▲1.1%
- Turnout: 22,781,766 (64.9%) ▼1.3 pp
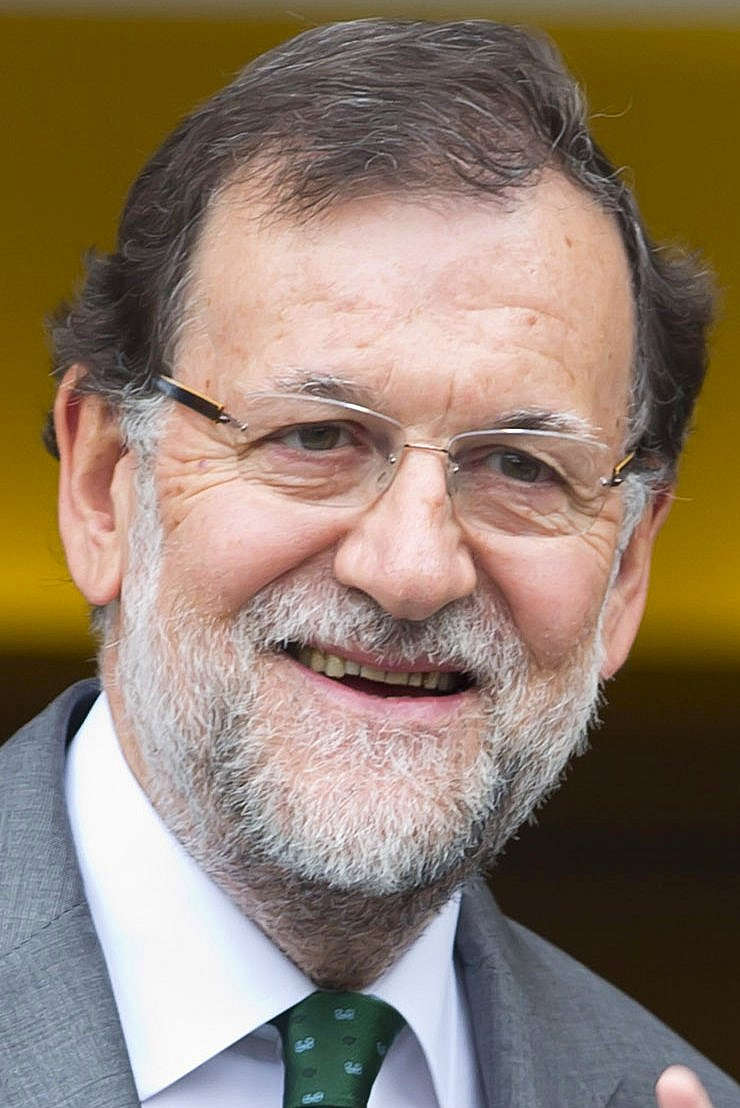

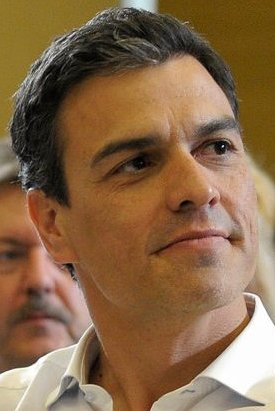

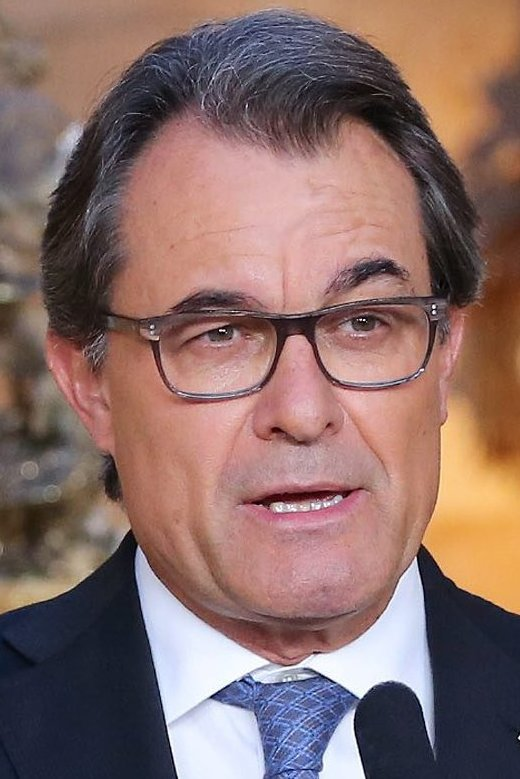

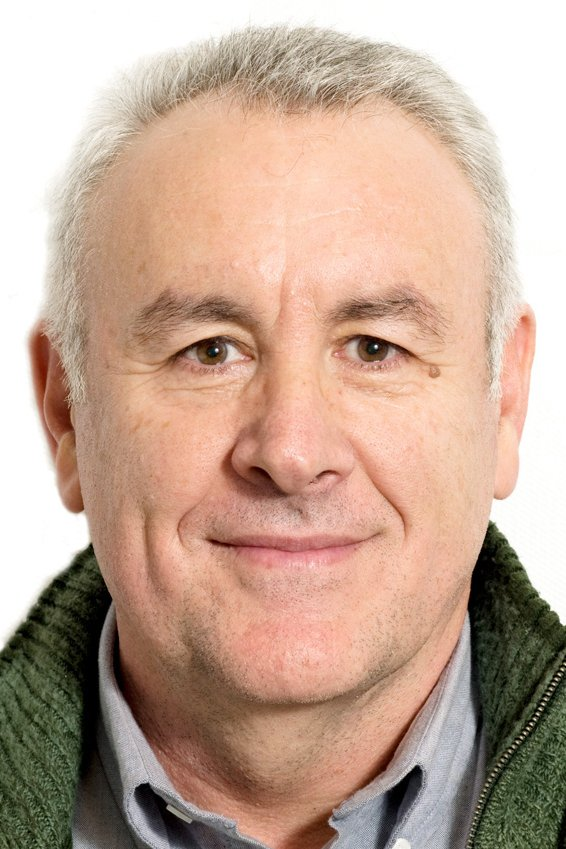

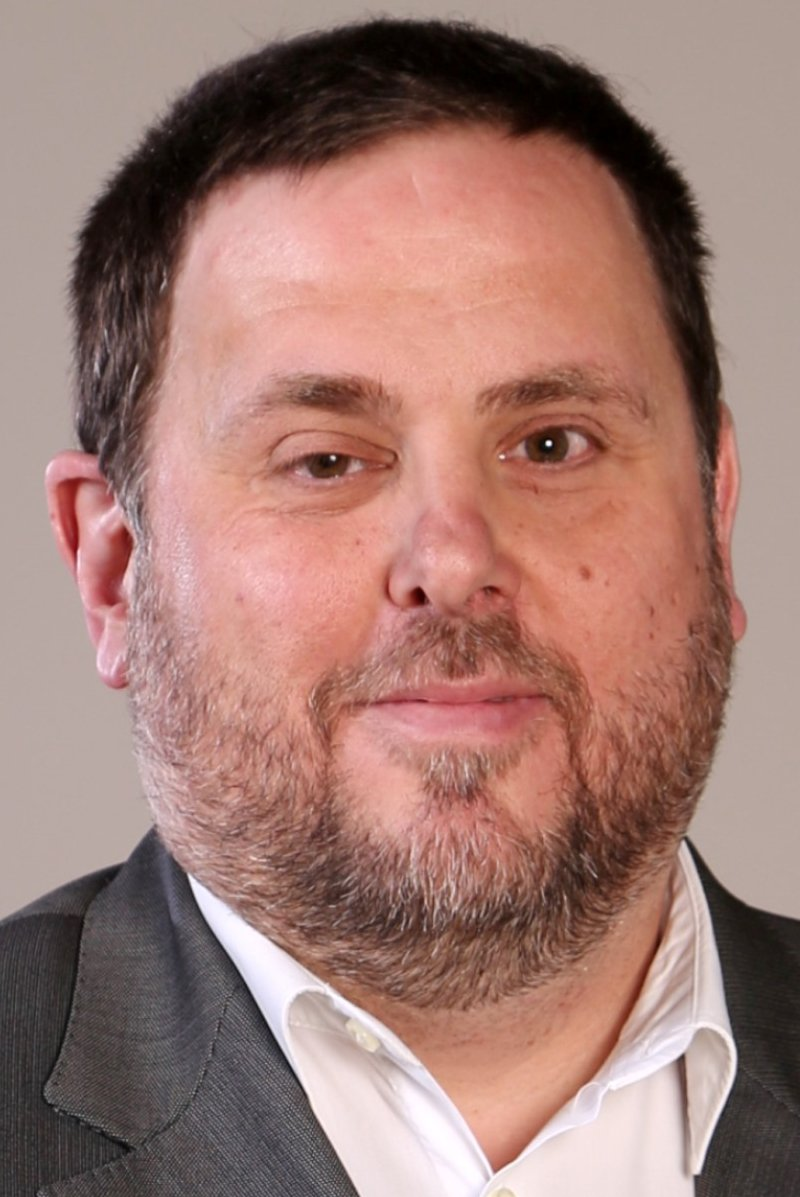

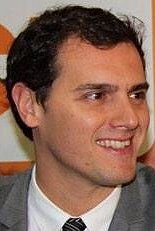
	First party	Second party	Third party
Leader	Mariano Rajoy	Pedro Sánchez	Artur Mas
Party	PP	PSOE	CiU
Leader since	2 October 2004	26 July 2014	27 November 2004
Last election	26,510 c., 37.5% (Note: Results for PP (37.5%, 26,507 c. and 618 p.) and totals within the Sa Unió alliance (3 c. and 3 p.) in the 2011 elections.); 621 p.	21,765 c., 27.8% (Note: Results for PSOE (27.8%, 21,761 c. and 482 p.) and totals within the PSOE–Pact for Ibiza alliance (4 c. and 4 p.) in the 2011 elections.); 486 p.	3,867 c., 3.5% 63 p.
Seats won	22,744 c. 483 p.	20,858 c. 464 p.	3,336 c. 51 p.
Seat change	▼3,766 c. ▼138 p.	▼907 c. ▼22 p.	▼531 c. ▼12 p.
Popular vote	6,070,176	5,613,733	669,781
Percentage	27.1%	25.0%	3.0%
Swing	▼10.4 pp	▼2.8 pp	▼0.5 pp
	Fourth party	Fifth party	Sixth party
Leader	Cayo Lara	Oriol Junqueras	Albert Rivera
Party	IU	ERC–AM	C's
Leader since	14 December 2008	17 September 2011	9 July 2006
Last election	2,649 c., 7.4% 29 p.	1,392 c., 1.2% 11 p.	81 c., 0.2% (Note: Results for C's (0.2%, 12 c. and 0 p.) and UPSa–C's (0.0%, 69 c. and 0 p.) in the 2011 elections.); 0 p.
Seats won	2,833 c. 41 p.	2,387 c. 32 p.	1,516 c. 41 p.
Seat change	▲184 c. ▲12 p.	▲995 c. ▲21 p.	▲1,435 c. ▲41 p.
Popular vote	1,445,071	513,529	1,469,875
Percentage	6.4%	2.3%	6.6%
Swing	▼0.8 pp	▲1.1 pp	▲6.4 pp
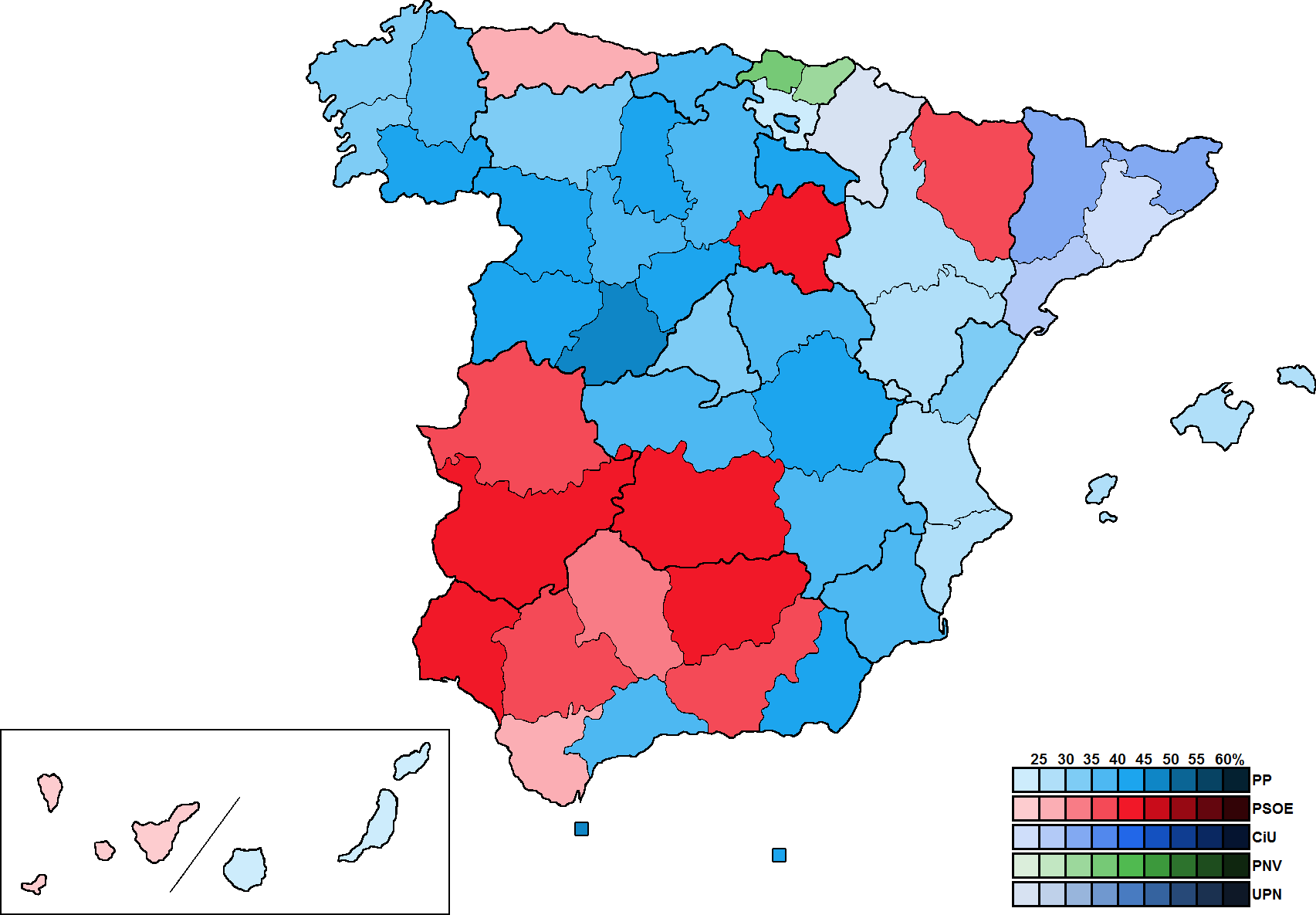
- Provincial results map for municipal elections

Local elections were held in Spain on 24 May 2015 to elect all 67,515 councillors in the 8,122 Spanish municipalities (including 50 seats in the assemblies of the autonomous cities of Ceuta and Melilla), all 1,193 provincial seats in 41 provinces (including 38 indirectly-elected provincial deputations and the three foral deputations in the Basque Country) and 231 seats in ten island councils (seven Canarian and four Balearic ones). They were held concurrently with regional elections in thirteen autonomous communities, as well as elections in the three foral deputations of the Basque Country, the four island councils in the Balearic Islands and the seven island cabildos in the Canary Islands.

== Background ==
After Podemos' success in the 2014 European Parliament election, the party decided not to directly contest the local elections scheduled for May 2015 to focus on the regional and general elections to be held throughout that year. Instead, they opted for the Guanyem Barcelona formula, popular unity municipal candidacies comprising different parties and social movements. The model was reproduced in many cities under the name Ganemos (Let's Win).

United Left (IU), the traditional left-wing third party of Spain, also started debating whether to join these local coalitions. However, this option was not well received by some party sectors, particularly their Madrid branch, who feared that the party would lose its identity if it joined these coalitions. The first attempt at a joint candidacy that included Podemos and United Left, among others, succeeded in Barcelona with Guanyem Barcelona, later Barcelona en Comú, under activist Ada Colau's leadership.

Another national party that decided to participate in most of these unitary candidacies was Equo, as well as minoritary parties like For a Fairer World (PUM+J), Building the Left–Socialist Alternative (CLI–AS), Republican Alternative (ALTER), Renewal–Nationalist Brotherhood (Anova), or Initiative for Catalonia Greens (ICV). The unitary lists also included individuals from social movements like the anti-eviction PAH, 15M, o the so-called mareas (Spanish for "tides") made up of workers from different service sectors like teachers, Public Health System workers or young people forced to migrate as a consequence of the 2008–15 Spanish financial crisis.

== Overview ==
=== Local government ===
Under the 1978 Constitution, the governance of municipalities in Spain was centered on the figure of city councils (Spanish: ayuntamientos), local corporations with independent legal personality composed of a mayor, a government council and an elected legislative assembly. The mayor was indirectly elected by the local assembly, requiring an absolute majority; otherwise, the candidate from the most-voted party automatically became mayor (ties were resolved by drawing lots). The concejo abierto system (English: open council), under which voters directly elected the local mayor by plurality voting, was reserved for some minor local entities.

Provincial deputations were the governing bodies of provinces in Spain—except for single-province autonomous communities—having an administration role of municipal activities and composed of a provincial president, an administrative body, and a plenary. For insular provinces, such as the Balearic and Canary Islands, deputations were replaced by island councils in each of the islands or group of islands. For Gran Canaria, Tenerife, Fuerteventura, La Gomera, El Hierro, Lanzarote and La Palma, this figure was referred to in Spanish as cabildo insular, whereas for Mallorca, Menorca, Ibiza and Formentera, its name was consejo insular (Catalan: consell insular). The three Basque provinces had foral deputations instead (called General Assemblies, or Juntas Generales).

=== Date ===
The term of local assemblies in Spain expired four years after the date of their previous election, with election day being fixed for the fourth Sunday of May every four years. The election decree was required to be issued no later than 54 days before the scheduled election date and published on the following day in the Official State Gazette (BOE). The previous local elections were held on 22 May 2011, setting the date for election day on the fourth Sunday of May four years later, which was 24 May 2015.

Local assemblies could not be dissolved before the expiration of their term, except in cases of mismanagement that seriously harmed the public interest and implied a breach of constitutional obligations, in which case the Council of Ministers could—optionally—decide to call a by-election.

Elections to the assemblies of local entities were officially called on 31 March 2015 with the publication of the corresponding decree in the BOE, setting election day for 24 May. Subsequent by-elections were called on 4 August (for 27 September) and 27 October (for 20 December).

=== Electoral system ===
Voting for local assemblies and island councils was based on universal suffrage, comprising all Spanish nationals over 18 years of age, registered and residing in the municipality or council and with full political rights (provided that they had not been deprived of the right to vote by a final sentence, nor were legally incapacitated), as well as resident non-national European citizens, and those whose country of origin allowed reciprocal voting by virtue of a treaty.

Local councillors were elected using the D'Hondt method and closed-list proportional voting, with a five percent-threshold of valid votes (including blank ballots) in each constituency. Each municipality or council was a multi-member constituency, with a number of seats based on the following scale:

Population	Councillors		
Population	Municipalities	Canary Islands	Balearic Islands (Note: For the Island Council of Formentera, councillors in the city council served as island councillors.)
<100	3	No island below 5,000 inhabitants	Fixed number: Ibiza: 13; Menorca: 13; Mallorca: 33; Formentera: Same as homonymous city council
101–250	5	No island below 5,000 inhabitants	Fixed number: Ibiza: 13; Menorca: 13; Mallorca: 33; Formentera: Same as homonymous city council
251–1,000	7	No island below 5,000 inhabitants	Fixed number: Ibiza: 13; Menorca: 13; Mallorca: 33; Formentera: Same as homonymous city council
1,001–2,000	9	No island below 5,000 inhabitants	Fixed number: Ibiza: 13; Menorca: 13; Mallorca: 33; Formentera: Same as homonymous city council
2,001–5,000	11	No island below 5,000 inhabitants	Fixed number: Ibiza: 13; Menorca: 13; Mallorca: 33; Formentera: Same as homonymous city council
5,001–10,000	13	11	Fixed number: Ibiza: 13; Menorca: 13; Mallorca: 33; Formentera: Same as homonymous city council
10,001–20,000	17	13	Fixed number: Ibiza: 13; Menorca: 13; Mallorca: 33; Formentera: Same as homonymous city council
20,001–50,000	21	17	Fixed number: Ibiza: 13; Menorca: 13; Mallorca: 33; Formentera: Same as homonymous city council
50,001–100,000	25	21	Fixed number: Ibiza: 13; Menorca: 13; Mallorca: 33; Formentera: Same as homonymous city council
>100,001	+1 per each 100,000 inhabitants or fraction +1 if total is an even number		Fixed number: Ibiza: 13; Menorca: 13; Mallorca: 33; Formentera: Same as homonymous city council

Councillors in municipalities below 250 inhabitants were elected using open-list partial block voting, with voters in constituencies between 101 and 250 inhabitants choosing up to four candidates; and in those below 100, up to two.

Most provincial deputations were indirectly elected by applying the D'Hondt method and a three percent-threshold of valid votes to municipal results—excluding candidacies not electing any councillor—in each judicial district. Seats were allocated to provincial deputations based on the following scale (with each judicial district being assigned an initial minimum of one seat and a maximum of three-fifths of the total number of provincial seats, with the remaining ones distributed in proportion to population):

Population	Seats
<500,000	25
500,001–1,000,000	27
1,000,001–3,500,000	31
>3,500,001	51

The General Assemblies of Álava, Biscay and Gipuzkoa were directly elected by voters under their own, specific electoral regulations.

The law did not provide for by-elections to fill vacant seats; instead, any vacancies arising after the proclamation of candidates and during the legislative term were filled by the next candidates on the party lists or, when required, by designated substitutes.

== Parties and candidates ==
The electoral law allowed for parties and federations registered in the interior ministry, alliances and groupings of electors to present lists of candidates. Parties and federations intending to form an alliance were required to inform the relevant electoral commission within 10 days of the election call, whereas groupings of electors needed to secure the signature of a determined amount of the electors registered in the municipality for which they sought election, disallowing electors from signing for more than one list:

- At least one percent of the electors in municipalities with a population below 5,000 inhabitants, provided that the number of signers was more than double that of councillors at stake.
- At least 100 signatures in municipalities with a population between 5,001 and 10,000.
- At least 500 signatures in municipalities with a population between 10,001 and 50,000.
- At least 1,500 signatures in municipalities with a population between 50,001 and 150,000.
- At least 3,000 signatures in municipalities with a population between 150,001 and 300,000.
- At least 5,000 signatures in municipalities with a population between 300,001 and 1,000,000.
- At least 8,000 signatures in municipalities with a population over 1,000,001.

Additionally, a balanced composition of men and women was required in the electoral lists, so that candidates of either sex made up at least 40 percent of the total composition.

== Results ==
=== Municipal ===
==== Overall ====
← Summary of the 24 May 2015 Spanish municipal election results →
Parties and alliances	Popular vote			Councillors	
Parties and alliances	Votes	%	±pp	Total	+/−
People's Party (PP)^{1}	6,070,176	27.06	−10.48	**22,744**	−3,766
Spanish Socialist Workers' Party (PSOE)^{2}	5,613,733	25.02	−2.77	**20,858**	−907
Podemos-linked citizen/popular unity platforms	1,795,737	8.00	New	**819**	+819
Platforms with Podemos as main promoter	1,200,411	5.35	New	477	+477
Platforms with Podemos and other parties as main promoters	496,873	2.21	New	235	+235
Podemos-linked platforms without an official endorsement	98,453	0.44	New	107	+107
Citizens–Party of the Citizenry (C's)^{3}	1,469,875	6.55	+6.33	**1,516**	+1,435
United Left (IU)	1,445,071	6.44	−1.00	**2,833**	+184
United Left (IU)^{4}	1,216,041	5.42	−0.81	2,423	+188
Agreement (Entesa)	165,666	0.74	−0.33	328	−72
United Left–Renewal–Son (EU–Anova–Son)^{5}	63,364	0.28	+0.15	82	+68
Convergence and Union (CiU)	669,781	2.99	−0.46	**3,336**	−531
Republican Left of Catalonia–Municipal Agreement (ERC–AM)	513,529	2.29	+1.09	**2,387**	+995
Commitment Coalition (Compromís)	384,083	1.71	+0.82	**724**	+343
Basque Nationalist Party (EAJ/PNV)	360,434	1.61	+0.16	**1,019**	+137
Basque Country Gather (EH Bildu)	309,315	1.38	−0.01	**1,195**	+56
Union, Progress and Democracy (UPyD)	232,478	1.04	−1.02	**128**	−24
Popular Unity Candidacy–Active People (CUP–PA)	209,584	0.93	+0.65	**362**	+261
Galician Nationalist Bloc–Open Assemblies (BNG)	190,158	0.85	−0.31	**468**	−221
Canarian Coalition–Canarian Nationalist Party (CCa–PNC)	157,968	0.70	−0.25	**308**	−101
Canarian Coalition–Canarian Nationalist Party (CCa–PNC)^{6}	155,968	0.70	−0.24	297	−100
Independent Herrenian Group (AHI)	2,000	0.01	±0.00	11	−1
Andalusian Party (PA)	151,069	0.67	−0.36	**319**	−157
Let's Win (Ganemos)	137,826	0.61	New	**90**	+90
Navarrese People's Union (UPN)	81,164	0.36	−0.03	**288**	−35
New Canaries–Broad Front (NC–FA)	75,010	0.33	+0.08	**90**	+28
Regionalist Party of Cantabria (PRC)	71,926	0.32	+0.01	**325**	+6
Forum of Citizens (FAC)	65,544	0.29	−0.25	**83**	−75
Vox (Vox)	64,148	0.29	New	**22**	+22
Aragonese Party (PAR)	59,420	0.26	−0.08	**918**	−73
More for Mallorca–APIB (Més–APIB)^{7}	58,112	0.26	+0.12	**128**	+48
Anti-Bullfighting Party Against Mistreatment of Animals (PACMA)	55,687	0.25	+0.13	0	±0
Aragonese Union (CHA)	42,110	0.19	−0.05	**164**	−21
El Pi–Proposal for the Isles (El Pi)^{8}	34,234	0.15	+0.05	**97**	+29
Participatory Democracy (Participa)	33,721	0.15	New	**6**	+6
United (Unidos)	30,458	0.14	±0.00	**38**	−9
United for Gran Canaria (UxGC)	20,570	0.09	New	12	+12
Majorero Progressive Party (PPMAJO)	3,384	0.02	±0.00	9	−8
Lanzarote Independents Party (PIL)	3,153	0.01	−0.01	7	−9
Citizens for Canarian Change (CIUCA)	3,035	0.01	−0.03	10	±0
Commitment to Gran Canaria (CGCa)	316	0.00	−0.06	0	−4
Yes to the Future (GBai)^{9}	29,635	0.13	−0.03	**59**	−11
Citizens of Democratic Centre (CCD)	29,298	0.13	+0.10	**44**	+27
Platform for Catalonia (PxC)	27,281	0.12	−0.17	**9**	−58
Yes We Can (SSP)^{10}	25,304	0.11	+0.03	**39**	+19
Equo (Equo)	24,790	0.11	New	**19**	+19
Union for Leganés (ULEG)	19,733	0.09	+0.03	**6**	+2
Blank Seats (EB)	18,225	0.08	New	**1**	+1
Commitment to Galicia–Transparent Councils (CxG–CCTT)	17,686	0.08	New	**41**	+41
Leonese People's Union (UPL)	16,946	0.08	−0.01	**139**	+5
Ourensan Democracy (DO)	14,746	0.07	+0.05	**12**	+10
Citizens' Movement of Cartagena (MCC)	14,700	0.07	+0.05	**5**	+4
Extremadurans (eXtremeños)	14,297	0.06	+0.05	**95**	+78
Galician Land (TeGa)	14,272	0.06	±0.00	**29**	+6
Neighbours' Alternative (AV)	14,146	0.06	+0.02	**17**	+6
Costa del Sol Can... Tic Tac (CSSPTT)	14,104	0.06	New	**12**	+12
Spain 2000 (E–2000)	13,796	0.06	±0.00	**7**	+2
Union of Independent Citizens (UCIN)^{11}	12,012	0.05	+0.02	**50**	+17
Communist Party of the Peoples of Spain (PCPE)	11,606	0.05	±0.00	**2**	+1
The Greens–Green Group (LV–GV)	11,432	0.05	+0.01	0	±0
Roque Aguayro (RA)	10,754	0.05	+0.01	**17**	+3
Let's Change Between All (CET)	10,532	0.05	New	**14**	+14
Coalition for El Bierzo (CB)^{12}	7,846	0.03	+0.02	**38**	+34
Independents of La Selva (IdSelva)	6,943	0.03	New	**43**	+43
More for Menorca (MpM)^{13}	4,669	0.02	±0.00	**13**	+6
Gomera Socialist Group (ASG)	4,287	0.02	New	**24**	+24
We Are Lanzarote (SomosLan)^{14}	3,864	0.02	+0.01	**9**	+7
People for Formentera (GxF)	1,817	0.01	±0.00	**9**	+3
Commitment to Formentera (CompromísFormentera)^{15}	460	0.00	n/a	**2**	±0
Others (lists at <0.05% not securing any provincial or island seat)	1,284,255	5.72	—	**5,495**	+431
Blank ballots	371,375	1.66	−0.93		
**Total**	**22,433,162**	**100.00**		**67,515**	**−715**
Valid votes	22,433,162	98.47	+0.16		
Invalid votes	348,604	1.53	−0.16		
**Votes cast / turnout**	**22,781,766**	**64.91**	**−1.25**		
Abstentions	12,317,356	35.09	+1.25		
**Registered voters**	**35,099,122**				
Sources
Footnotes: ^{1} Including results within The Union of Formentera alliance in the 2011 elections.; ^{2} Including results within the PSOE–Pact for Ibiza alliance in the 2011 elections.; ^{3} Citizens–Party of the Citizenry results are compared to the combined totals of Citizens–Party of the Citizenry and Yes for Salamanca in the 2011 elections.; ^{4} United Left does not include results in Galicia.; ^{5} United Left–Renewal–Son results are compared to United Left totals in Galicia in the 2011 elections.; ^{6} Canarian Coalition–Canarian Nationalist Party results are compared to the combined totals of Canarian Coalition–Nationalist Party–Canarian Centre and Canarian Nationalist Party in the 2011 elections.; ^{7} More for Mallorca–APIB results are compared to PSM–Initiative Greens–Agreement–APIB totals in the 2011 elections.; ^{8} El Pi–Proposal for the Isles results are compared to the combined totals of Convergence for the Isles and Regionalist League of the Balearic Islands in the 2011 elections.; ^{9} Yes to the Future results are compared to Navarre Yes 2011 totals in the 2011 elections.; ^{10} Yes We Can results are compared to Yes We Can Citizens' Alternative totals in the 2011 elections.; ^{11} Union of Independent Citizens results are compared to Union of Independent Citizens of Toledo totals in the 2011 elections.; ^{12} Coalition for El Bierzo results are compared to Party of El Bierzo totals in the 2011 elections.; ^{13} More for Menorca results are compared to Socialist Party of Menorca–Nationalist Agreement totals in the 2011 elections.; ^{14} We Are Lanzarote results are compared to 25 May Citizens' Alternative totals in the 2011 elections.; ^{15} Within The Union of Formentera alliance in the 2011 elections.

Popular vote
PP	27.06%
PSOE	25.02%
Podemos	8.00%
C's	6.55%
IU	6.44%
CiU	2.99%
ERC–AM	2.29%
Compromís	1.71%
EAJ/PNV	1.61%
EH Bildu	1.38%
UPyD	1.04%
CUP–PA	0.93%
BNG	0.85%
CCa–PNC	0.70%
PA	0.67%
Ganemos	0.61%
Others	10.49%
Blank ballots	1.66%

==== City control ====
The following table lists party control in provincial capitals (highlighted in bold), as well as in municipalities above 75,000. Gains for a party are highlighted in that party's colour.

Municipality	Population	Previous control	New control
**A Coruña**	244,810	People's Party (PP)	Atlantic Tide (Marea)
**Albacete**	172,426	People's Party (PP)	People's Party (PP)
Alcalá de Guadaíra	75,080	Spanish Socialist Workers' Party (PSOE)	Spanish Socialist Workers' Party (PSOE)
Alcalá de Henares	200,768	People's Party (PP)	People's Party (PP)
Alcobendas	112,188	People's Party (PP)	People's Party (PP)
Alcorcón	170,336	People's Party (PP)	People's Party (PP)
Algeciras	120,601	People's Party (PP)	People's Party (PP)
**Alicante**	332,067	People's Party (PP)	Spanish Socialist Workers' Party (PSOE) (PP in 2018)
**Almería**	193,351	People's Party (PP)	People's Party (PP)
Arona	79,928	Canarian Coalition (CCa)	Spanish Socialist Workers' Party (PSOE)
**Ávila**	58,358	People's Party (PP)	People's Party (PP)
Avilés	81,659	Spanish Socialist Workers' Party (PSOE)	Spanish Socialist Workers' Party (PSOE)
**Badajoz**	149,946	People's Party (PP)	People's Party (PP)
Badalona	217,210	People's Party (PP)	Let's Win Badalona–Badalona in Common (GBC) (PSC–PSOE in 2018)
Barakaldo	100,080	Spanish Socialist Workers' Party (PSOE)	Basque Nationalist Party (EAJ/PNV)
**Barcelona**	1,602,386	Convergence and Union (CiU)	Barcelona in Common (BComú)
**Bilbao**	346,574	Basque Nationalist Party (EAJ/PNV)	Basque Nationalist Party (EAJ/PNV)
**Burgos**	177,100	People's Party (PP)	People's Party (PP)
**Cáceres**	95,814	People's Party (PP)	People's Party (PP)
**Cádiz**	118,919	People's Party (PP)	For Cádiz Yes We Can (PCSSP)
Cartagena	216,451	People's Party (PP)	Citizens' Movement of Cartagena (MCC)
**Castellón de la Plana**	173,841	People's Party (PP)	Spanish Socialist Workers' Party (PSOE)
Chiclana de la Frontera	82,645	People's Party (PP)	Spanish Socialist Workers' Party (PSOE)
**Ciudad Real**	74,054	People's Party (PP)	Spanish Socialist Workers' Party (PSOE)
**Córdoba**	326,609	People's Party (PP)	Spanish Socialist Workers' Party (PSOE)
Cornellà de Llobregat	86,234	Socialists' Party of Catalonia (PSC–PSOE)	Socialists' Party of Catalonia (PSC–PSOE)
Coslada	88,847	People's Party (PP)	Spanish Socialist Workers' Party (PSOE)
**Cuenca**	55,102	Spanish Socialist Workers' Party (PSOE)	People's Party (PP)
**Donostia/San Sebastián**	186,126	Basque Country Gather (EH Bildu)	Basque Nationalist Party (EAJ/PNV)
Dos Hermanas	131,855	Spanish Socialist Workers' Party (PSOE)	Spanish Socialist Workers' Party (PSOE)
El Ejido	84,144	People's Party (PP)	People's Party (PP)
El Puerto de Santa María	88,184	People's Party (PP)	Spanish Socialist Workers' Party (PSOE)
Elche	228,647	People's Party (PP)	Spanish Socialist Workers' Party (PSOE)
Ferrol	70,389 (Note: Reached 75,000 in 1970–2007.)	People's Party (PP)	Ferrol in Common (FeC)
Fuengirola	77,525	People's Party (PP)	People's Party (PP)
Fuenlabrada	195,864	Spanish Socialist Workers' Party (PSOE)	Spanish Socialist Workers' Party (PSOE)
Gandía	76,497	People's Party (PP)	Spanish Socialist Workers' Party (PSOE)
Getafe	173,057	People's Party (PP)	Spanish Socialist Workers' Party (PSOE)
Getxo	79,544	Basque Nationalist Party (EAJ/PNV)	Basque Nationalist Party (EAJ/PNV)
Gijón	275,735	Forum of Citizens (FAC)	Forum of Citizens (FAC)
**Girona**	97,227	Convergence and Union (CiU)	Convergence and Union (CiU)
**Granada**	234,758	People's Party (PP)	People's Party (PP) (PSOE in 2016)
**Guadalajara**	83,633	People's Party (PP)	People's Party (PP)
**Huelva**	146,318	People's Party (PP)	Spanish Socialist Workers' Party (PSOE)
**Huesca**	52,555	People's Party (PP)	Spanish Socialist Workers' Party (PSOE)
**Jaén**	115,395	People's Party (PP)	People's Party (PP)
Jerez de la Frontera	212,830	People's Party (PP)	Spanish Socialist Workers' Party (PSOE)
L'Hospitalet de Llobregat	253,518	Socialists' Party of Catalonia (PSC–PSOE)	Socialists' Party of Catalonia (PSC–PSOE)
**Las Palmas de Gran Canaria**	379,766	People's Party (PP)	Spanish Socialist Workers' Party (PSOE)
Las Rozas de Madrid	92,784	People's Party (PP)	People's Party (PP)
Leganés	186,696	People's Party (PP)	Spanish Socialist Workers' Party (PSOE)
**León**	127,817	People's Party (PP)	People's Party (PP)
**Lleida**	139,176	Socialists' Party of Catalonia (PSC–PSOE)	Socialists' Party of Catalonia (PSC–PSOE)
**Logroño**	151,962	People's Party (PP)	People's Party (PP)
Lorca	91,759	People's Party (PP)	People's Party (PP)
**Lugo**	98,560	Spanish Socialist Workers' Party (PSOE)	Spanish Socialist Workers' Party (PSOE)
**Madrid**	3,165,235	People's Party (PP)	Madrid Now (Ahora Madrid)
**Málaga**	566,913	People's Party (PP)	People's Party (PP)
Manresa	75,297	Convergence and Union (CiU)	Convergence and Union (CiU)
Marbella	139,537	People's Party (PP)	Spanish Socialist Workers' Party (PSOE) (PP in 2017)
Mataró	124,280	Convergence and Union (CiU)	Socialists' Party of Catalonia (PSC–PSOE)
Mijas	77,521	People's Party (PP)	Citizens–Party of the Citizenry (C's)
Móstoles	205,712	People's Party (PP)	Spanish Socialist Workers' Party (PSOE)
**Murcia**	439,712	People's Party (PP)	People's Party (PP)
Orihuela	83,417	The Greens (LV)	People's Party (PP)
**Ourense**	106,905	Spanish Socialist Workers' Party (PSOE)	People's Party (PP)
**Oviedo**	223,765	People's Party (PP)	Spanish Socialist Workers' Party (PSOE)
**Palencia**	79,595	People's Party (PP)	People's Party (PP)
**Palma**	400,578	People's Party (PP)	Spanish Socialist Workers' Party (PSOE) (Més in 2017)
**Pamplona**	196,166	Navarrese People's Union (UPN)	Basque Country Gather (EH Bildu)
Parla	125,323	Spanish Socialist Workers' Party (PSOE)	People's Party (PP)
**Pontevedra**	82,946	Galician Nationalist Bloc (BNG)	Galician Nationalist Bloc (BNG)
Pozuelo de Alarcón	84,360	People's Party (PP)	People's Party (PP)
Reus	104,962	Convergence and Union (CiU)	Convergence and Union (CiU)
Rivas-Vaciamadrid	80,483	United Left (IU)	United Left (IU)
Roquetas de Mar	91,682	People's Party (PP)	People's Party (PP)
Sabadell	207,444	Socialists' Party of Catalonia (PSC–PSOE)	Republican Left of Catalonia (ERC) (CUP in 2017)
**Salamanca**	146,438	People's Party (PP)	People's Party (PP)
San Cristóbal de La Laguna	152,843	Canarian Coalition (CCa)	Canarian Coalition (CCa)
San Fernando	95,949	People's Party (PP)	Spanish Socialist Workers' Party (PSOE)
San Sebastián de los Reyes	83,329	People's Party (PP)	Spanish Socialist Workers' Party (PSOE)
Sant Boi de Llobregat	83,107	Socialists' Party of Catalonia (PSC–PSOE)	Socialists' Party of Catalonia (PSC–PSOE)
Sant Cugat del Vallès	87,118	Convergence and Union (CiU)	Convergence and Union (CiU)
Santa Coloma de Gramenet	118,738	Socialists' Party of Catalonia (PSC–PSOE)	Socialists' Party of Catalonia (PSC–PSOE)
**Santa Cruz de Tenerife**	203,811	Canarian Coalition (CCa)	Canarian Coalition (CCa)
**Santander**	175,736	People's Party (PP)	People's Party (PP)
Santiago de Compostela	95,800	People's Party (PP)	Open Compostela (CA)
**Segovia**	52,728	Spanish Socialist Workers' Party (PSOE)	Spanish Socialist Workers' Party (PSOE)
**Seville**	693,878	People's Party (PP)	Spanish Socialist Workers' Party (PSOE)
**Soria**	39,168	Spanish Socialist Workers' Party (PSOE)	Spanish Socialist Workers' Party (PSOE)
Talavera de la Reina	84,119	People's Party (PP)	People's Party (PP)
**Tarragona**	132,199	Socialists' Party of Catalonia (PSC–PSOE)	Socialists' Party of Catalonia (PSC–PSOE)
Telde	102,078	People's Party (PP)	New Canaries (NCa)
Terrassa	215,517	Socialists' Party of Catalonia (PSC–PSOE)	Socialists' Party of Catalonia (PSC–PSOE)
**Teruel**	35,675	People's Party (PP)	People's Party (PP)
**Toledo**	83,459	Spanish Socialist Workers' Party (PSOE)	Spanish Socialist Workers' Party (PSOE)
Torrejón de Ardoz	126,878	People's Party (PP)	People's Party (PP)
Torrent	80,551	People's Party (PP)	Spanish Socialist Workers' Party (PSOE)
Torrevieja	91,415	People's Party (PP)	The Greens (LV)
**Valencia**	786,424	People's Party (PP)	Commitment Coalition (Compromís)
**Valladolid**	303,905	People's Party (PP)	Spanish Socialist Workers' Party (PSOE)
Vélez-Málaga	78,166	People's Party (PP)	Spanish Socialist Workers' Party (PSOE)
Vigo	294,997	Spanish Socialist Workers' Party (PSOE)	Spanish Socialist Workers' Party (PSOE)
**Vitoria-Gasteiz**	242,082	People's Party (PP)	Basque Nationalist Party (EAJ/PNV)
**Zamora**	63,831	People's Party (PP)	United Left (IU)
**Zaragoza**	666,058	Spanish Socialist Workers' Party (PSOE)	Zaragoza in Common (ZeC)

==== Autonomous cities ====
The following table lists party control in the autonomous cities. Gains for a party are highlighted in that party's colour.

City	Population	Previous control	New control
Ceuta	84,963	People's Party (PP)	People's Party (PP)
Melilla	84,509	People's Party (PP)	People's Party (PP)

=== Provincial and island ===
==== Summary ====
← Summary of the 24 May 2015 Spanish provincial and island election results →
Parties and alliances	Seats				
Parties and alliances	PD	IC	FD	Total	+/−
People's Party (PP)^{1}	415	51	17	**483**	−138
Spanish Socialist Workers' Party (PSOE)^{2}	391	52	21	**464**	−22
Podemos-linked citizen/popular unity platforms	24	27	20	**71**	+71
We Can (Podemos)	—	27	20	47	+47
Platforms with Podemos and other parties as main promoters	16	—	—	16	+16
Platforms with Podemos as main promoter	8	—	—	8	+8
Basque Nationalist Party (EAJ/PNV)	—	—	54	**54**	+5
Convergence and Union (CiU)	51	—	—	**51**	−12
Citizens–Party of the Citizenry (C's)	36	4	1	**41**	+41
United Left (IU)	40	0	1	**41**	+12
United Left (IU)^{3}	36	0	1	37	+12
Agreement (Entesa)	3	—	—	3	−1
United Left–Renewal–Son (EU–Anova–Son)^{4}	1	—	—	1	+1
Canarian Coalition–Canarian Nationalist Party (CCa–PNC)	—	41	—	**41**	−12
Canarian Coalition–Canarian Nationalist Party (CCa–PNC)	—	35	—	35	−12
Independent Herrenian Group (AHI)	—	6	—	6	±0
Basque Country Gather (EH Bildu)^{5}	—	—	39	**39**	−7
Republican Left of Catalonia–Municipal Agreement (ERC–AM)	32	—	—	**32**	+21
New Canaries–Broad Front (NC–FA)	—	13	—	**13**	+8
Galician Nationalist Bloc (BNG)	12	—	—	**12**	−1
Commitment Coalition (Compromís)	11	—	—	**11**	+9
Gomera Socialist Group (ASG)	—	10	—	**10**	+10
Aragonese Party (PAR)	9	—	—	**9**	−1
People for Formentera (GxF)	—	9	—	**9**	+3
United (Unidos)	—	7	—	**7**	+1
United for Gran Canaria (UxGC)	—	4	—	4	+4
Majorero Progressive Party (PPMAJO)	—	2	—	2	−1
Lanzarote Independents Party (PIL)	—	1	—	1	−2
Popular Unity Candidacy (CUP)	6	—	—	**6**	+6
More for Mallorca–PSM–Agreement–Initiative Greens (Més–PSM–Entesa–IV)^{6}	—	6	—	**6**	+2
El Pi–Proposal for the Isles (El Pi)	—	3	—	**3**	+3
More for Menorca (MpM)^{7}	—	3	—	**3**	+2
Union, Progress and Democracy (UPyD)	2	0	0	**2**	±0
Aragonese Union (CHA)	2	—	—	**2**	+1
Ourensan Democracy (DO)	2	—	—	**2**	+2
We Are Lanzarote (SomosLan)^{8}	—	2	—	**2**	+1
Commitment to Formentera (CompromísFormentera)^{9}	—	2	—	**2**	±0
Andalusian Party (PA)	1	—	—	**1**	−1
Participatory Democracy (Participa)	1	—	—	**1**	+1
Equo (Equo)	1	—	—	**1**	+1
Leonese People's Union (UPL)	1	—	—	**1**	±0
Neighbours' Alternative (AV)	1	—	—	**1**	+1
Coalition for El Bierzo (CB)	1	—	—	**1**	+1
Independents of La Selva (IdSelva)	1	—	—	**1**	+1
Yes We Can (SSP)	—	1	—	**1**	+1
Cordobese Union (UCOR)	0	—	—	0	−2
Zamoran Independent Electors (ADEIZA)	0	—	—	0	−1
Citizen Forum of Jerez (FCJ)	0	—	—	0	−1
Municipal Assemblies of Fuerteventura (AMF)	—	0	—	0	−2
People for Ibiza (GxE)^{10}	—	0	—	0	−1
Sorian People's Platform (PPSO)	n/a	n/a	n/a	0	−1
**Total**	**1,040**	**231**	**153**	**1,424**	**+2**
Sources
Footnotes: ^{1} Including results within The Union of Formentera alliance in the 2011 elections.; ^{2} Including results within the PSOE–Pact for Ibiza alliance in the 2011 elections.; ^{3} United Left does not include results in Galicia.; ^{4} United Left–Renewal–Son results are compared to United Left totals in Galicia in the 2011 elections.; ^{5} Basque Country Gather results are compared to the combined totals of Gather–Basque Solidarity–Alternative and Aralar in the 2011 elections.; ^{6} More for Mallorca–PSM–Agreement–Initiative Greens results are compared to PSM–Initiative Greens–Agreement totals in the 2011 elections.; ^{7} More for Menorca results are compared to Socialist Party of Menorca–Nationalist Agreement totals in the 2011 elections.; ^{8} We Are Lanzarote results are compared to 25 May Citizens' Alternative totals in the 2011 elections.; ^{9} Within The Union of Formentera alliance in the 2011 elections.; ^{10} Within the PSOE–Pact for Ibiza alliance in the 2011 elections.

==== Indirectly-elected ====
The following table lists party control in the indirectly-elected provincial deputations. Gains for a party are highlighted in that party's colour.

Province	Population	Previous control	New control
A Coruña	1,132,735	People's Party (PP)	Spanish Socialist Workers' Party (PSOE)
Albacete	396,987	People's Party (PP)	Spanish Socialist Workers' Party (PSOE)
Alicante	1,868,438	People's Party (PP)	People's Party (PP)
Almería	701,688	People's Party (PP)	People's Party (PP)
Ávila	167,015	People's Party (PP)	People's Party (PP)
Badajoz	690,929	Spanish Socialist Workers' Party (PSOE)	Spanish Socialist Workers' Party (PSOE)
Barcelona	5,523,784	Convergence and Union (CiU)	Convergence and Union (CiU)
Burgos	365,525	People's Party (PP)	People's Party (PP)
Cáceres	408,703	People's Party (PP)	Spanish Socialist Workers' Party (PSOE)
Cádiz	1,240,175	People's Party (PP)	Spanish Socialist Workers' Party (PSOE)
Castellón	587,508	People's Party (PP)	People's Party (PP)
Ciudad Real	519,613	Spanish Socialist Workers' Party (PSOE)	Spanish Socialist Workers' Party (PSOE)
Córdoba	799,402	People's Party (PP)	Spanish Socialist Workers' Party (PSOE)
Cuenca	207,449	People's Party (PP)	People's Party (PP)
Girona	756,156	Convergence and Union (CiU)	Convergence and Union (CiU)
Granada	919,455	People's Party (PP)	Spanish Socialist Workers' Party (PSOE)
Guadalajara	255,426	People's Party (PP)	People's Party (PP)
Huelva	519,229	Spanish Socialist Workers' Party (PSOE)	Spanish Socialist Workers' Party (PSOE)
Huesca	224,909	Spanish Socialist Workers' Party (PSOE)	Spanish Socialist Workers' Party (PSOE)
Jaén	659,033	Spanish Socialist Workers' Party (PSOE)	Spanish Socialist Workers' Party (PSOE)
León	484,694	People's Party (PP)	People's Party (PP)
Lleida	438,001	Convergence and Union (CiU)	Convergence and Union (CiU)
Lugo	342,748	Spanish Socialist Workers' Party (PSOE)	People's Party (PP)
Málaga	1,621,968	People's Party (PP)	People's Party (PP)
Ourense	322,293	People's Party (PP)	People's Party (PP)
Palencia	167,609	People's Party (PP)	People's Party (PP)
Pontevedra	950,919	People's Party (PP)	Spanish Socialist Workers' Party (PSOE)
Salamanca	342,459	People's Party (PP)	People's Party (PP)
Segovia	159,303	People's Party (PP)	People's Party (PP)
Seville	1,941,355	Spanish Socialist Workers' Party (PSOE)	Spanish Socialist Workers' Party (PSOE)
Soria	92,221	People's Party (PP)	Spanish Socialist Workers' Party (PSOE)
Tarragona	800,962	Convergence and Union (CiU)	Convergence and Union (CiU)
Teruel	140,365	People's Party (PP)	Aragonese Party (PAR)
Toledo	699,136	People's Party (PP)	Spanish Socialist Workers' Party (PSOE)
Valencia	2,548,898	People's Party (PP)	Spanish Socialist Workers' Party (PSOE)
Valladolid	529,157	People's Party (PP)	People's Party (PP)
Zamora	185,432	People's Party (PP)	People's Party (PP)
Zaragoza	960,111	People's Party (PP)	Spanish Socialist Workers' Party (PSOE)

==== Island councils ====
The following table lists party control in the island councils. Gains for a party are highlighted in that party's colour.

Island	Population	Previous control	New control
El Hierro	10,675	Spanish Socialist Workers' Party (PSOE)	Independent Herrenian Group (AHI)
Formentera	11,545	People for Formentera (GxF)	People for Formentera (GxF)
Fuerteventura	106,930	Canarian Coalition–Canarian Nationalist Party (CCa–PNC)	Canarian Coalition–Canarian Nationalist Party (CCa–PNC)
Gran Canaria	851,157	People's Party (PP)	New Canaries (NCa)
Ibiza	140,271	People's Party (PP)	Spanish Socialist Workers' Party (PSOE)
La Gomera	20,721	Gomera Socialist Group (ASG)	Gomera Socialist Group (ASG)
La Palma	83,456	Spanish Socialist Workers' Party (PSOE)	Spanish Socialist Workers' Party (PSOE)
Lanzarote	141,940	Canarian Coalition–Canarian Nationalist Party (CCa–PNC)	Canarian Coalition–Canarian Nationalist Party (CCa–PNC)
Mallorca	858,313	People's Party (PP)	More for Mallorca (Més)
Menorca	93,313	People's Party (PP)	More for Menorca (MpM) (PSOE in 2017)
Tenerife	889,936	Canarian Coalition–Canarian Nationalist Party (CCa–PNC)	Canarian Coalition–Canarian Nationalist Party (CCa–PNC)

==== Foral deputations ====
The following table lists party control in the foral deputations. Gains for a party are highlighted in that party's colour.

Province	Population	Previous control	New control
Álava	321,932	People's Party (PP)	Basque Nationalist Party (EAJ/PNV)
Biscay	1,151,905	Basque Nationalist Party (EAJ/PNV)	Basque Nationalist Party (EAJ/PNV)
Gipuzkoa (Note: Renamed from Guipúzcoa in July 2011.)	715,018	Basque Country Gather (EH Bildu)	Basque Nationalist Party (EAJ/PNV)

== Bibliography ==
- Constitución Española (Constitution). Official State Gazette (in Spanish). 27 December 1978 [version as of 27 September 2011]. BOE-A-1978-31229.
- Ley Orgánica 10/1982, de 10 de agosto, de Estatuto de Autonomía de Canarias (Organic Law 10/1982). Official State Gazette (in Spanish). 10 August 1982 [version as of 17 July 2010]. BOE-A-1982-20821.
- Ley 27/1983, de 25 de noviembre, de Relaciones entre las Instituciones Comunes de la Comunidad Autónoma y los Órganos Forales de sus Territorios Históricos (Law 27/1983). Official State Gazette (in Spanish). 25 November 1983 [version as of 19 July 2006]. BOE-A-2012-5193.
- Ley 7/1985, de 2 de abril, Reguladora de las Bases del Régimen Local (Law 7/1985). Official State Gazette (in Spanish). 2 April 1985 [version as of 30 December 2013]. BOE-A-1985-5392.
- Ley Orgánica 5/1985, de 19 de junio, del Régimen Electoral General (Organic Law 5/1985). Official State Gazette (in Spanish). 19 June 1985 [version as of 31 March 2015]. BOE-A-1985-11672.
- Ley 8/1986, de 26 de noviembre, Electoral de la Comunidad Autónoma de las Islas Baleares (Law 8/1986). Official State Gazette (in Spanish). 26 November 1986 [version as of 3 November 2006]. BOE-A-1987-2903.
- Ley 1/1987, de 27 de marzo, de Elecciones para las Juntas Generales de los Territorios Históricos de Araba, Bizkaia y Gipuzkoa (Law 1/1987). Official State Gazette (in Spanish). 27 March 1987 [version as of 2 March 2005]. BOE-A-2012-3948.
- Ley 8/2000, de 27 de octubre, de Consejos Insulares (Law 8/2000). Official State Gazette (in Spanish). 27 October 2000 [version as of 9 July 2012]. BOE-A-2000-20977.
- Ley Orgánica 1/2007, de 28 de febrero, de reforma del Estatuto de Autonomía de las Illes Balears (Organic Law 1/2007). Official State Gazette (in Spanish). 28 February 2007 [version as of 17 July 2010]. BOE-A-2007-4233.
- Ley 7/2009, de 11 de diciembre, electoral de los Consejos Insulares (Law 7/2009). Official State Gazette (in Spanish). 11 December 2009 [version as of 22 December 2009]. BOE-A-2010-1399.
- Ley 19/2011, de 5 de julio, por la que pasan a denominarse oficialmente "Araba/Álava", "Gipuzkoa" y "Bizkaia" las demarcaciones provinciales llamadas anteriormente "Álava", "Guipúzcoa" y "Vizcaya" (Law 19/2011). Official State Gazette (in Spanish). 5 July 2011. BOE-A-2011-11606.
- Ley 8/2015, de 1 de abril, de Cabildos Insulares (Law 8/2015). Official State Gazette (in Spanish). 1 April 2015 [version as of 14 April 2015]. BOE-A-2015-4621.
- Real Decreto 233/2015, de 30 de marzo, por el que se convocan elecciones locales y a las Asambleas de Ceuta y Melilla para el 24 de mayo de 2015 (Royal Decree 233/2015). Official State Gazette (in Spanish). 30 March 2015. BOE-A-2015-3448.
- Real Decreto 741/2015, de 31 de julio, por el que se convocan elecciones locales parciales 2015 por haberse declarado la nulidad de la elección celebrada el 24 de mayo de 2015 (Royal Decree 741/2015). Official State Gazette (in Spanish). 31 July 2015. BOE-A-2015-8769.
- Real Decreto 953/2015, de 26 de octubre, por el que se convocan elecciones locales parciales (Royal Decree 953/2015). Official State Gazette (in Spanish). 30 March 2015. BOE-A-2015-11508.
