= Opinion polling for the 2007 Spanish local elections =

In the run up to the 2007 Spanish local elections, various organisations carried out opinion polling to gauge voting intention in local entities in Spain. Results of such polls are displayed in this article. The date range for these opinion polls are from the previous local elections, held on 25 May 2003, to the day the next elections were held, on 27 May 2007.

Polls are listed in reverse chronological order, showing the most recent first and using the dates when the survey fieldwork was done, as opposed to the date of publication. Where the fieldwork dates are unknown, the date of publication is given instead. The highest percentage figure in each polling survey is displayed with its background shaded in the leading party's colour. If a tie ensues, this is applied to the figures with the highest percentages. The "Lead" columns on the right shows the percentage-point difference between the parties with the highest percentages in a given poll.

== Nationwide polling ==
The table below lists nationwide voting intention estimates. Refusals are generally excluded from the party vote percentages, while question wording and the treatment of "don't know" responses and those not intending to vote may vary between polling organisations.

Polling firm/Commissioner	Fieldwork date	Sample size	Turnout	PSOE	PP	IU	CiU	Lead
2007 local elections	27 May 2007	—N/a	64.0	34.9	35.6	5.4	3.3	0.7
Metroscopia/ABC	16–18 Apr 2007	1,002	65	38.3	36.2	5.7	–	2.1
2003 local elections	25 May 2003	—N/a	64.0	34.8	34.3	6.1	3.4	0.5

== Sub-national polling ==
Opinion poll results for municipalities in each of Spain's autonomous communities, as well as for the Canarian and Balearic island councils, may be found below:

=== Andalusia ===
==== Málaga ====
Polling firm/Commissioner	Fieldwork date	Sample size	Turnout	PP	PSOE–A	IULV	Lead
2007 municipal election	27 May 2007	—N/a	50.2	51.0; 17	36.3; 12	7.2; 2	14.7
Sigma Dos/El Mundo	2–9 May 2007	400	?	52.3; 17/18	34.3; 11/12	7.8; 2	18.0
2003 municipal election	25 May 2003	—N/a	56.3	49.1; 17	34.2; 12	8.3; 2	14.9

=== Basque Country ===
==== Bilbao ====
Polling firm/Commissioner	Fieldwork date	Sample size	Turnout	PNV	PP	PSE–EE (PSOE)	EB–B	Aralar	EA	Lead
2007 municipal election	27 May 2007	—N/a	57.0	41.2; 13	22.4; 7	22.0; 7	8.0; 2	(Note: Within EB–B.)	2.7; 0	18.8
Sigma Dos/El Mundo	2–9 May 2007	400	?	40.1; 12/13	25.2; 8	20.8; 6/7	8.9; 2		–	14.9
2003 municipal election	25 May 2003	—N/a	68.3	41.3; 13	25.9; 8	18.7; 5	10.2; 3	1.4; 0	(Note: Within PNV.)	15.4

==== Donostia-San Sebastián ====
Polling firm/Commissioner	Fieldwork date	Sample size	Turnout	PSE–EE (PSOE)	PNV	PP	EB–B	Aralar	EA	Lead
2007 municipal election	27 May 2007	—N/a	54.9	37.4; 11	17.2; 5	21.4; 6	11.4; 3		8.3; 2	16.0
Sigma Dos/El Mundo	2–9 May 2007	400	?	36.3; 10/11	24.6; 7	23.5; 7	9.9; 2/3		3.6; 0	11.7
2003 municipal election	25 May 2003	—N/a	66.5	35.6; 10	29.7; 9	23.8; 7	5.2; 1	3.4; 0		5.9

==== Vitoria-Gasteiz ====
Polling firm/Commissioner	Fieldwork date	Sample size	Turnout	PP	PNV	PSE–EE (PSOE)	EB–B	Aralar	EA	Lead
2007 municipal election	27 May 2007	—N/a	62.3	29.7; 9	21.9; 6	31.4; 9	7.5; 2		5.6; 1	1.7
Opina/Cadena SER	15 May 2007	?	?	31.0; 9	22.0; 6	30.0; 8/9	? 2		? 1/2	1.0
Sigma Dos/El Mundo	2–9 May 2007	400	?	29.5; 9	24.3; 7/8	28.8; 8/9	9.1; 2		4.3; 0	0.7
CIS	9–29 Apr 2007	800	?	31.5; 9	26.4; 8	25.2; 7	11.0; 3		3.7; 0	5.1
2003 municipal election	25 May 2003	—N/a	70.9	30.5; 9	29.4; 9	23.9; 7	8.0; 2	1.8; 0		1.1

=== Castile and León ===
==== León ====
Polling firm/Commissioner	Fieldwork date	Sample size	Turnout	PP	PSOE	UPL	Lead
2007 municipal election	27 May 2007	—N/a	63.1	37.6; 11	44.2; 13	10.8; 3	6.6
Sigma Dos/El Mundo	2–9 May 2007	400	?	43.7; 12/13	41.4; 11/12	10.6; 3	2.3
2003 municipal election	25 May 2003	—N/a	65.3	38.5; 12	34.2; 10	19.2; 5	4.3

==== Valladolid ====
Polling firm/Commissioner	Fieldwork date	Sample size	Turnout	PP	PSOE	IUCyL	Lead
2007 municipal election	27 May 2007	—N/a	69.1	47.8; 15	39.0; 13	5.9; 1	8.8
Opina/Cadena SER	13 May 2007	800	?	48.7; 15	44.0; 13	5.6; 1	4.7
Sigma Dos/El Mundo	27 Apr–2 May 2007	500	?	47.1; 14/15	42.1; 13/14	5.7; 1	5.0
2003 municipal election	25 May 2003	—N/a	70.7	44.6; 15	39.8; 13	5.3; 1	4.8

=== Galicia ===
==== A Coruña ====
Polling firm/Commissioner	Fieldwork date	Sample size	Turnout	PSdeG–PSOE	PP	BNG	EU–IU	Lead
2007 municipal election	27 May 2007	—N/a	53.9	35.0; 11	31.4; 10	20.7; 6	3.2; 0	3.6
Opina/Cadena SER	15 May 2007	600	?	48.0; 14/15	27.5; 8	16.5; 4	5.0; 0/1	20.5
Sigma Dos/El Mundo	2–9 May 2007	400	?	47.8; 14	23.7; 6/7	23.2; 6/7	–	24.1
2003 municipal election	25 May 2003	—N/a	57.3	45.7; 14	24.1; 7	22.7; 6	2.5; 0	21.6

==== Santiago de Compostela ====
Polling firm/Commissioner	Fieldwork date	Sample size	Turnout	PSdeG–PSOE	PP	BNG	EU–IU	Lead
2007 municipal election	27 May 2007	—N/a	56.5	38.2; 10	39.0; 11	16.5; 4	2.3; 0	0.7
CIS	9–29 Apr 2007	800	?	47.1; 12/13	33.1; 9	13.8; 3/4	1.8; 0	14.0
2003 municipal election	25 May 2003	—N/a	64.8	40.3; 11	36.4; 10	16.7; 4	1.2; 0	3.9
