= 2007 Spanish local elections =

- 27 May 2007 (Note: By-elections were held on 28 October 2007 in those constituencies where results were annulled by a final sentence following an electoral petition, or where elections were not held due to a lack of candidates.)

All 66,131 councillors in 8,111 municipal councils (Note: Including 50 seats in the assemblies of Ceuta and Melilla.) All 1,416 provincial/island seats in 44 provinces (Note: Including: 1,038 seats in 38 provincial deputations; 153 seats in 3 Basque foral deputations; 153 seats in 7 Canarian island cabildos; 72 seats in 4 Balearic island councils.)
- Opinion polls
- Registered: 35,153,523 ▲2.2%
- Turnout: 22,488,232 (64.0%) ▼3.7 pp
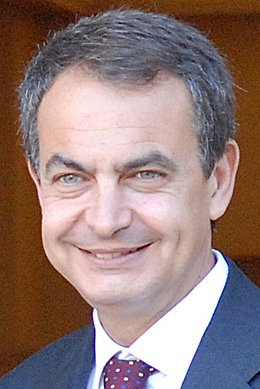

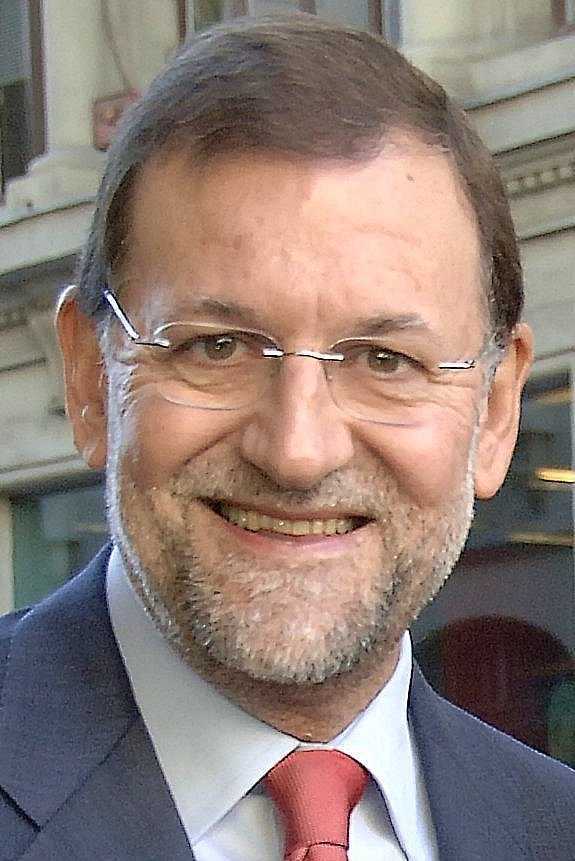

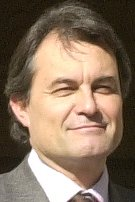

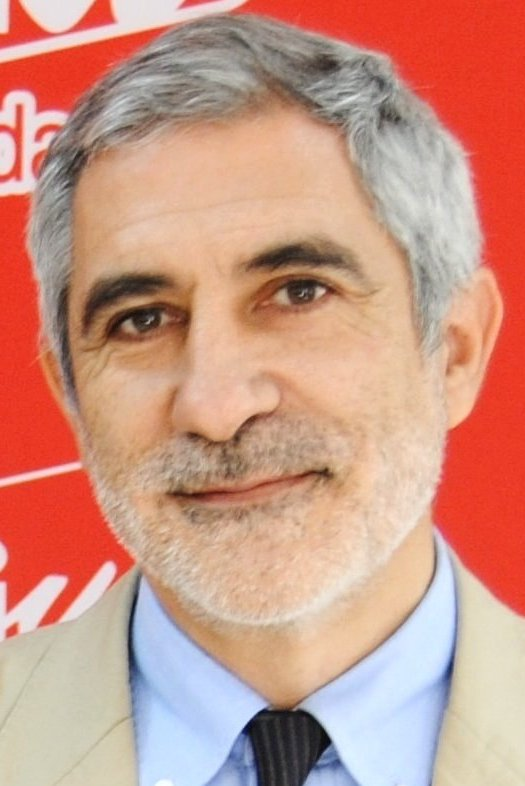

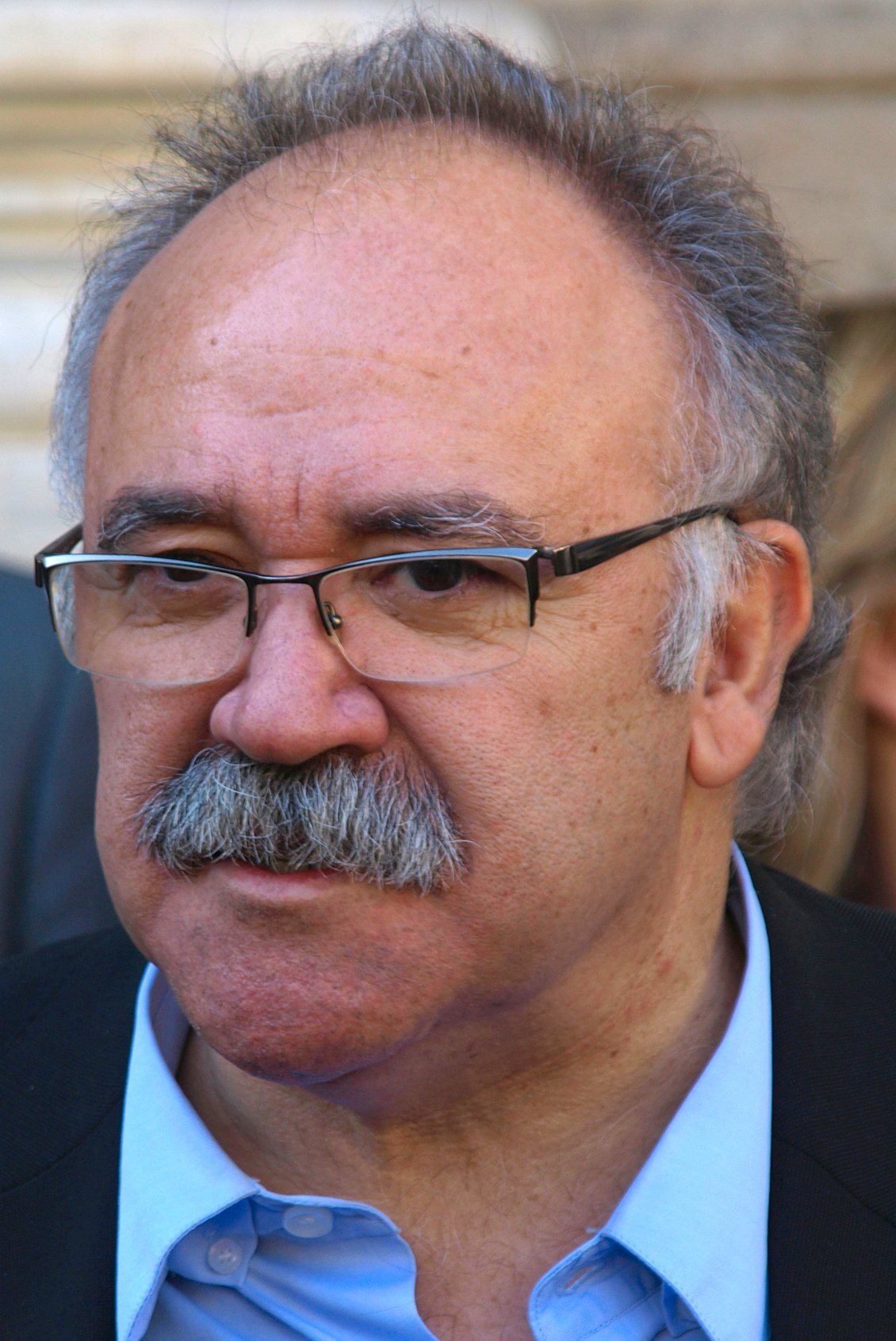

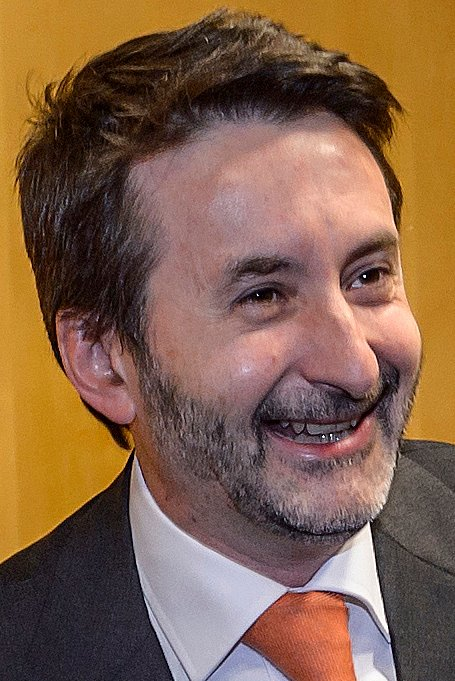
	First party	Second party	Third party
Leader	José Luis Rodríguez Zapatero	Mariano Rajoy	Artur Mas
Party	PSOE	PP	CiU
Leader since	22 July 2000	2 October 2004	27 November 2004
Last election	23,257 c., 34.9% (Note: Results for PSOE (34.8%, 23,224 c. and 555 p.) and Pacte (0.1%, 33 c. and 5 p.) in the 2003 elections.); 560 p.	23,670 c., 34.3% (Note: Results for PP (34.8%, 23,615 c. and 527 p.) and EU (0.0%, 55 c. and 0 p.) in the 2003 elections.); 527 p.	3,687 c., 3.4% 50 p.
Seats won	24,029 c. 590 p.	23,348 c. 530 p.	3,387 c. 51 p.
Seat change	▲772 c. ▲30 p.	▼322 c. ▲3 p.	▼300 c. ▲1 p.
Popular vote	7,760,865	7,916,075	723,325
Percentage	34.9%	35.6%	3.3%
Swing	0.0 pp	▲1.3 pp	▼0.1 pp
	Fourth party	Fifth party	Sixth party
Leader	Gaspar Llamazares	Josep-Lluís Carod-Rovira	Josu Jon Imaz
Party	IU	ERC–AM	EAJ/PNV
Leader since	29 October 2000	25 November 1996	18 January 2004
Last election	2,622 c., 7.5% (Note: Results for IU (7.4%, 2,589 c. and 48 p.; not including Mallorca), Aralar in the Basque Country (0.1%, 30 c. and 1 p.) and UDCE (0.0%, 3 c. and 0 p.) in the 2003 elections.); 49 p.	1,282 c., 1.8% 13 p.	1,499 c., 52 p. (PNV–EA) (Note: Within the PNV–EA alliance in the 2005 election: PNV (1,499 c. and 52 p.) and EA (103 c. and 21 p.).)
Seats won	2,595 c. 41 p.	1,591 c. 13 p.	1,043 c. 53 p.
Seat change	▼27 c. ▼8 p.	▲309 c. 0 p.	▼456 c. ▲1 p.
Popular vote	1,554,180	347,601	310,036
Percentage	7.0%	1.6%	1.4%
Swing	▼0.5 pp	▼0.2 pp	n/a
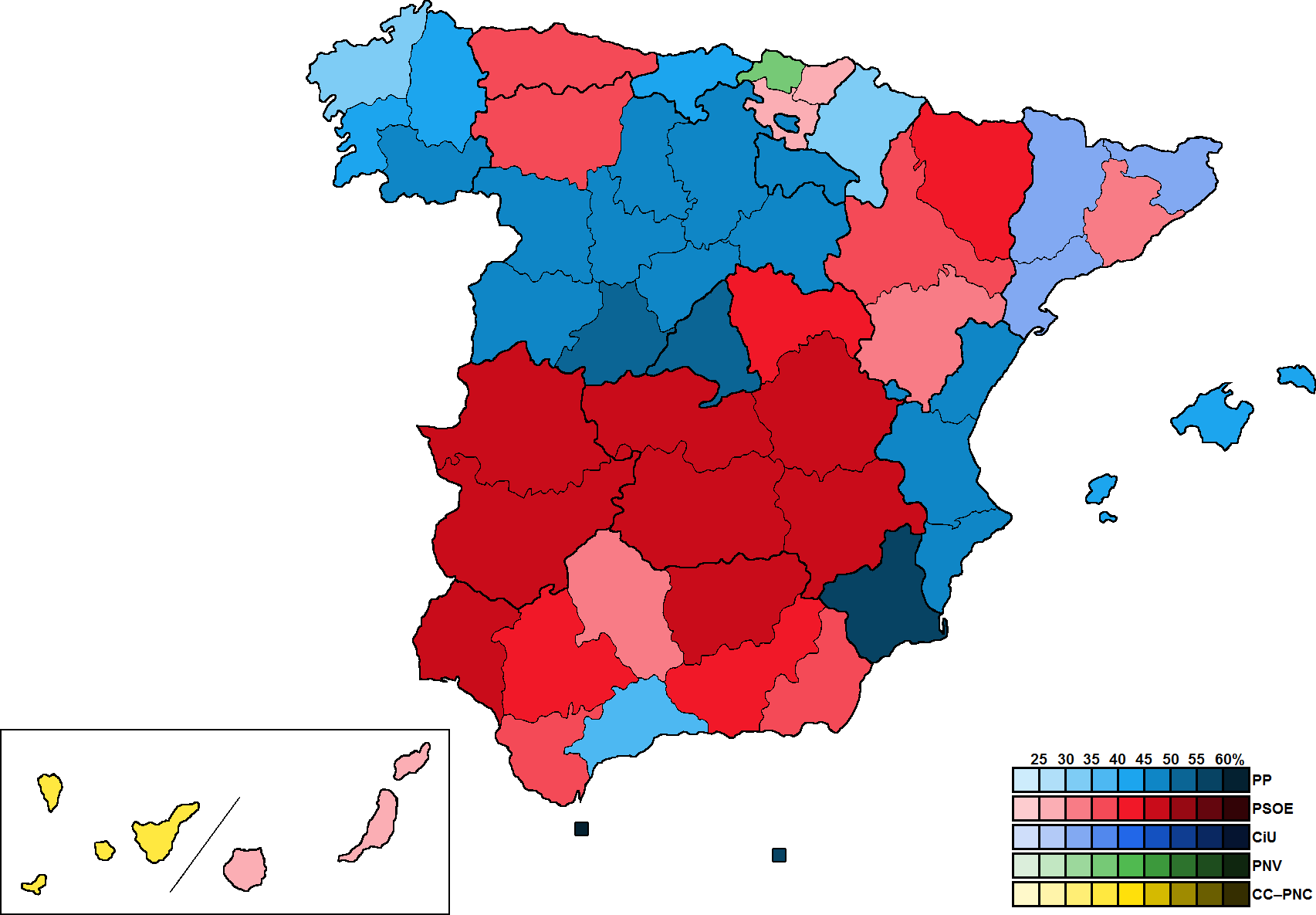
- Provincial results map for municipal elections

Local elections were held in Spain on 27 May 2007 to elect all 66,131 councillors in the 8,111 Spanish municipalities (including 50 seats in the assemblies of the autonomous cities of Ceuta and Melilla), all 1,191 provincial seats in 41 provinces (including 38 indirectly-elected provincial deputations and the three foral deputations in the Basque Country) and 225 seats in ten island councils (seven Canarian and four Balearic ones). They were held concurrently with regional elections in thirteen autonomous communities.

The results saw few changes overall; most incumbent governments retained their majority, with only a few exceptions. The PP government in the Balearics fell, and a coalition led by PSOE took power. While the elections were seen as a first indication of how the 2008 Spanish general election might turn out, the results proved to be inconclusive. In 2003, the PSOE had a slight edge with 34.8 against the PP's 34.3; in this election, the PP had 35.6 to the PSOE's 34.9. Turnout was slightly lower, with 63.8 instead of 67.7 four years earlier.

== Overview ==
=== Local government ===
Under the 1978 Constitution, the governance of municipalities in Spain was centered on the figure of city councils (Spanish: ayuntamientos), local corporations with independent legal personality composed of a mayor, a government council and an elected legislative assembly. The mayor was indirectly elected by the local assembly, requiring an absolute majority; otherwise, the candidate from the most-voted party automatically became mayor (ties were resolved by drawing lots). The concejo abierto system (English: open council), under which voters directly elected the local mayor by plurality voting, was reserved for municipalities under 100 inhabitants and some minor local entities.

Provincial deputations were the governing bodies of provinces in Spain—except for single-province autonomous communities—having an administration role of municipal activities and composed of a provincial president, an administrative body, and a plenary. For insular provinces, such as the Balearic and Canary Islands, deputations were replaced by island councils in each of the islands or group of islands. For Gran Canaria, Tenerife, Fuerteventura, La Gomera, El Hierro, Lanzarote and La Palma, this figure was referred to in Spanish as cabildo insular, whereas for Mallorca, Menorca, Ibiza and Formentera, its name was consejo insular (Catalan: consell insular). The three Basque provinces had foral deputations instead (called General Assemblies, or Juntas Generales).

=== Date ===
The term of local assemblies in Spain expired four years after the date of their previous election, with election day being fixed for the fourth Sunday of May every four years. The election decree was required to be issued no later than 54 days before the scheduled election date and published on the following day in the Official State Gazette (BOE). The previous local elections were held on 25 May 2003, setting the date for election day on the fourth Sunday of May four years later, which was 27 May 2007.

Local assemblies could not be dissolved before the expiration of their term, except in cases of mismanagement that seriously harmed the public interest and implied a breach of constitutional obligations, in which case the Council of Ministers could—optionally—decide to call a by-election.

Elections to the assemblies of local entities were officially called on 3 April 2007 with the publication of the corresponding decree in the BOE, setting election day for 27 May. Subsequent by-elections were called on 4 September, for 28 October.

=== Electoral system ===
Voting for local assemblies and island councils was based on universal suffrage, comprising all Spanish nationals over 18 years of age, registered and residing in the municipality or council and with full political rights (provided that they had not been deprived of the right to vote by a final sentence, nor were legally incapacitated), as well as resident non-national European citizens, and those whose country of origin allowed reciprocal voting by virtue of a treaty.

Local councillors were elected using the D'Hondt method and closed-list proportional voting, with a five percent-threshold of valid votes (including blank ballots) in each constituency. Each municipality or council was a multi-member constituency, with a number of seats based on the following scale:

Population	Councillors		
Population	Municipalities	Canary Islands	Balearic Islands (Note: For the Island Council of Formentera, councillors in the city council served as island councillors.)
<250	5	No island below 5,000 inhabitants	Fixed number: Ibiza: 13; Menorca: 13; Mallorca: 33; Formentera: Same as homonymous city council
251–1,000	7	No island below 5,000 inhabitants	Fixed number: Ibiza: 13; Menorca: 13; Mallorca: 33; Formentera: Same as homonymous city council
1,001–2,000	9	No island below 5,000 inhabitants	Fixed number: Ibiza: 13; Menorca: 13; Mallorca: 33; Formentera: Same as homonymous city council
2,001–5,000	11	No island below 5,000 inhabitants	Fixed number: Ibiza: 13; Menorca: 13; Mallorca: 33; Formentera: Same as homonymous city council
5,001–10,000	13	11	Fixed number: Ibiza: 13; Menorca: 13; Mallorca: 33; Formentera: Same as homonymous city council
10,001–20,000	17	13	Fixed number: Ibiza: 13; Menorca: 13; Mallorca: 33; Formentera: Same as homonymous city council
20,001–50,000	21	17	Fixed number: Ibiza: 13; Menorca: 13; Mallorca: 33; Formentera: Same as homonymous city council
50,001–100,000	25	21	Fixed number: Ibiza: 13; Menorca: 13; Mallorca: 33; Formentera: Same as homonymous city council
>100,001	+1 per each 100,000 inhabitants or fraction +1 if total is an even number		Fixed number: Ibiza: 13; Menorca: 13; Mallorca: 33; Formentera: Same as homonymous city council

Councillors in municipalities between 100 and 250 inhabitants were elected using open-list partial block voting, with voters choosing up to four candidates.

Most provincial deputations were indirectly elected by applying the D'Hondt method and a three percent-threshold of valid votes to municipal results—excluding candidacies not electing any councillor—in each judicial district. Seats were allocated to provincial deputations based on the following scale (with each judicial district being assigned an initial minimum of one seat and a maximum of three-fifths of the total number of provincial seats, with the remaining ones distributed in proportion to population):

Population	Seats
<500,000	25
500,001–1,000,000	27
1,000,001–3,500,000	31
>3,500,001	51

The General Assemblies of Álava, Biscay and Gipuzkoa were directly elected by voters under their own, specific electoral regulations.

The law did not provide for by-elections to fill vacant seats; instead, any vacancies arising after the proclamation of candidates and during the legislative term were filled by the next candidates on the party lists or, when required, by designated substitutes.

== Parties and candidates ==
The electoral law allowed for parties and federations registered in the interior ministry, alliances and groupings of electors to present lists of candidates. Parties and federations intending to form an alliance were required to inform the relevant electoral commission within 10 days of the election call, whereas groupings of electors needed to secure the signature of a determined amount of the electors registered in the municipality for which they sought election, disallowing electors from signing for more than one list:

- At least one percent of the electors in municipalities with a population below 5,000 inhabitants, provided that the number of signers was more than double that of councillors at stake.
- At least 100 signatures in municipalities with a population between 5,001 and 10,000.
- At least 500 signatures in municipalities with a population between 10,001 and 50,000.
- At least 1,500 signatures in municipalities with a population between 50,001 and 150,000.
- At least 3,000 signatures in municipalities with a population between 150,001 and 300,000.
- At least 5,000 signatures in municipalities with a population between 300,001 and 1,000,000.
- At least 8,000 signatures in municipalities with a population over 1,000,001.

Amendments in 2007 required a balanced composition of men and women in the electoral lists, so that candidates of either sex made up at least 40 percent of the total composition.

== Results ==
=== Municipal ===
==== Overall ====
← Summary of the 27 May 2007 Spanish municipal election results →
Parties and alliances	Popular vote			Councillors	
Parties and alliances	Votes	%	±pp	Total	+/−
People's Party (PP)	7,916,075	35.62	+1.28	**23,348**	−322
People's Party (PP)^{1}	7,805,165	35.12	+1.21	23,012	−323
Navarrese People's Union (UPN)	110,910	0.50	+0.06	336	+1
Spanish Socialist Workers' Party (PSOE)^{2}	7,760,865	34.92	+0.02	**24,029**	+772
United Left (IU)	1,554,180	6.99	−0.54	**2,595**	−27
United Left (IU)^{3}	1,210,478	5.45	−0.15	1,994	−122
Initiative–EUiA–Agreement for Municipal Progress (ICV–EUiA–EPM)	259,099	1.17	−0.29	456	+59
United Left–Greens–Aralar–Stand up (EB–B–Aralar–Zutik)^{4}	84,603	0.38	−0.09	145	+36
Convergence and Union (CiU)	723,325	3.25	−0.20	**3,387**	−300
Republican Left of Catalonia–Municipal Agreement (ERC–AM)	347,601	1.56	−0.27	**1,591**	+309
Galician Nationalist Bloc (BNG)	315,279	1.42	±0.00	**661**	+66
Basque Nationalist Party (EAJ/PNV)^{5}	310,036	1.39	n/a	**1,043**	−456
Andalusian Party (PA)	237,098	1.07	−0.42	**527**	−166
Canarian Coalition–Canarian Nationalist Party (CC–PNC)	217,678	0.98	−0.32	**404**	−65
Canarian Coalition–Canarian Nationalist Party (CC–PNC)^{6}	215,045	0.97	−0.32	393	−66
Independent Herrenian Group (AHI)	2,633	0.01	±0.00	11	+1
Valencian Nationalist Bloc–The Greens Ecologist Left (Bloc–EVEE)	105,754	0.48	−0.13	**277**	−21
Basque Nationalist Action (EAE/ANV)^{7} ^{8}	94,253	0.42	+0.36	**432**	+369
Aragonese Party (PAR)	94,079	0.42	+0.05	**983**	+76
Regionalist Party of Cantabria (PRC)	73,657	0.33	+0.04	**303**	+27
Basque Solidarity (EA)^{5}	72,590	0.33	n/a	**255**	+152
The Greens (LV)	72,297	0.33	−0.19	**24**	+5
Citizens–Party of the Citizenry (C's)	71,226	0.32	New	**13**	+13
Aragonese Union (CHA)	58,463	0.26	−0.13	**228**	+32
New Canaries (NC)	57,624	0.26	New	**61**	+61
Navarre Yes (NaBai)^{9}	52,387	0.24	+0.07	**133**	+31
Canarian Centre (CCN)	48,969	0.22	+0.16	**69**	+35
Canarian Centre (CCN)^{10}	40,323	0.18	+0.13	47	+40
Lanzarote Independents Party (PIL)	8,646	0.04	−0.01	22	−5
Socialist Party of Andalusia (PSA)	48,365	0.22	−0.04	**64**	+7
Majorcan Union (UM)	36,558	0.16	±0.00	**99**	−4
Leonese People's Union–United Zamora (UPL–ZU)^{11}	34,044	0.15	−0.06	**188**	−77
Galician Land (TeGa)	33,626	0.15	New	**66**	+66
Bloc for Mallorca (PSM–EN, EU–EV, ERC)^{12}	31,670	0.14	−0.10	**58**	−46
Party of Almería (PdeAL)	22,554	0.10	New	**61**	+61
Popular Unity Candidacy (CUP)	21,803	0.10	+0.07	**24**	+18
Valencian Coalition (CVa)	21,304	0.10	New	**20**	+20
Independent Candidacy–The Party of Castile and León (CI–PCL)	19,885	0.09	+0.03	**149**	+84
Galicianist Party (PG)	19,739	0.09	New	**10**	+10
Valencian Union–The Eco-pacifist Greens (UV–LVEP)	19,419	0.09	−0.29	**29**	−102
Federation of Independents of Catalonia (FIC)	17,478	0.08	−0.02	**86**	−18
Social Democratic Party (PSD)	14,634	0.07	New	**16**	+16
Commoners' Land (TC)	14,331	0.06	−0.01	**93**	+51
Vallès Alternative Candidacies (CAV)	13,471	0.06	New	**13**	+13
Liberal Democratic Centre (CDL)	12,705	0.06	New	**38**	+38
Independents for Extremadura (IPEx)	12,693	0.06	New	**85**	+85
Platform for Catalonia (PxC)	12,425	0.06	+0.05	**17**	+13
Asturian Renewal Union–Asturianist Party (URAS–PAS)^{13}	11,513	0.05	−0.06	**11**	−21
Anti-Bullfighting Party Against Mistreatment of Animals (PACMA)	11,148	0.05	New	0	±0
Riojan Party (PR)	11,085	0.05	−0.01	**43**	−22
Commitment to Gran Canaria (CGCa)	10,688	0.05	New	**2**	+2
Union of the Salamancan People (UPSa)	10,179	0.05	+0.02	**85**	+27
The Greens of the Community of Madrid (LVCM)	10,061	0.05	−0.04	**5**	+3
Independent Solution (SI)	8,039	0.04	±0.00	**34**	+24
Zamoran Independent Electors–Zamoran People's Union (ADEIZA–UPZ)	6,705	0.03	+0.01	**63**	+31
Initiative for the Development of Soria (IDES)	3,753	0.02	±0.00	**20**	−1
PSM–Nationalist Agreement–The Greens of Menorca (PSM–EN, EV–Me)	1,800	0.01	±0.00	**5**	−1
People for Formentera (GxF)	1,134	0.01	New	**5**	+5
Independents of Formentera Group (GUIF)	518	0.00	±0.00	**2**	−1
Others (lists at <0.05% not securing any provincial or island seat)	1,124,438	5.06	—	**4,436**	−217
Blank ballots	427,061	1.92	+0.16		
**Total**	**22,225,879**	**100.00**		**66,131**	**+621**
Valid votes	22,225,879	98.83	+0.13		
Invalid votes	262,353	1.17	−0.13		
**Votes cast / turnout**	**22,488,232**	**63.97**	**−3.70**		
Abstentions	12,665,291	36.03	+3.70		
**Registered voters**	**35,153,523**				
Sources
Footnotes: ^{1} People's Party results are compared to the combined totals of People's Party and United Extremadura in the 2003 elections.; ^{2} Spanish Socialist Workers' Party results are compared to the combined totals of Spanish Socialist Workers' Party and Progressive Pact in the 2003 elections.; ^{3} United Left results are compared to the combined totals of United Left and Ceutan Democratic Union in the 2003 elections, without including results in the Basque Country and Mallorca.; ^{4} United Left–Greens–Aralar–Stand up results are compared to the combined totals of United Left and Aralar in the Basque Country in the 2003 elections.; ^{5} Within the Basque Nationalist Party–Basque Solidarity alliance in the 2003 elections.; ^{6} Canarian Coalition–Canarian Nationalist Party results are compared to the combined totals of Canarian Coalition and Canarian Nationalist Party in the 2003 elections.; ^{7} Basque Nationalist Action results are compared to Meeting Point for Self-Determination totals in the 2003 elections.; ^{8} The Supreme Court annulled 133 of the 256 lists of Basque Nationalist Action due to them being a continuation of the outlawed Unity party. Results for EAE/ANV refer only to the 123 lists which were not invalidated.; ^{9} Navarre Yes results are compared to the combined totals of Aralar, Basque Solidarity–Basque Nationalist Party and Assembly in Navarre in the 2003 elections.; ^{10} Canarian Centre results are compared to the combined totals of Canarian Union and Independents of Fuerteventura in the 2003 elections.; ^{11} Leonese People's Union–United Zamora results are compared to the combined totals of Leonese People's Union and United Zamora in the 2003 elections.; ^{12} Bloc for Mallorca results are compared to the combined totals of Socialist Party of Mallorca–Nationalist Agreement and United Left (in Mallorca) in the 2003 elections.; ^{13} Asturian Renewal Union–Asturianist Party results are compared to the combined totals of Asturian Renewal Union and Asturianist Party in the 2003 elections.

Popular vote
PP	35.62%
PSOE	34.92%
IU	6.99%
CiU	3.25%
ERC–AM	1.56%
BNG	1.42%
EAJ/PNV	1.39%
PA	1.07%
CC–PNC	0.98%
Others	10.87%
Blank ballots	1.92%

==== City control ====
The following table lists party control in provincial capitals (highlighted in bold), as well as in municipalities above 75,000. Gains for a party are highlighted in that party's colour.

Municipality	Population	Previous control	New control
**A Coruña**	243,320	Spanish Socialist Workers' Party (PSOE)	Spanish Socialist Workers' Party (PSOE)
**Albacete**	161,508	Spanish Socialist Workers' Party (PSOE)	Spanish Socialist Workers' Party (PSOE)
Alcalá de Henares	201,380	People's Party (PP)	People's Party (PP)
Alcobendas	104,118	Spanish Socialist Workers' Party (PSOE)	People's Party (PP)
Alcorcón	164,633	Spanish Socialist Workers' Party (PSOE)	Spanish Socialist Workers' Party (PSOE)
Algeciras	112,937	Spanish Socialist Workers' Party (PSOE)	Spanish Socialist Workers' Party (PSOE)
**Alicante**	322,431	People's Party (PP)	People's Party (PP)
**Almería**	185,309	People's Party (PP)	People's Party (PP)
**Ávila**	53,272	People's Party (PP)	People's Party (PP)
Avilés	83,538	Spanish Socialist Workers' Party (PSOE)	Spanish Socialist Workers' Party (PSOE)
**Badajoz**	143,748	People's Party (PP)	People's Party (PP)
Badalona	221,520	Socialists' Party of Catalonia (PSC–PSOE)	Socialists' Party of Catalonia (PSC–PSOE)
Barakaldo	95,640	Spanish Socialist Workers' Party (PSOE)	Spanish Socialist Workers' Party (PSOE)
**Barcelona**	1,605,602	Socialists' Party of Catalonia (PSC–PSOE)	Socialists' Party of Catalonia (PSC–PSOE)
**Bilbao**	354,145	Basque Nationalist Party (EAJ/PNV)	Basque Nationalist Party (EAJ/PNV)
**Burgos**	173,676	People's Party (PP)	People's Party (PP)
**Cáceres**	90,218	People's Party (PP)	Spanish Socialist Workers' Party (PSOE)
**Cádiz**	130,561	People's Party (PP)	People's Party (PP)
Cartagena	208,609	People's Party (PP)	People's Party (PP)
**Castellón de la Plana**	172,110	People's Party (PP)	People's Party (PP)
**Ciudad Real**	70,124	People's Party (PP)	People's Party (PP)
**Córdoba**	322,867	United Left (IU)	United Left (IU)
Cornellà de Llobregat	84,289	Socialists' Party of Catalonia (PSC–PSOE)	Socialists' Party of Catalonia (PSC–PSOE)
Coslada	83,233	People's Party (PP)	Spanish Socialist Workers' Party (PSOE)
**Cuenca**	51,205	Spanish Socialist Workers' Party (PSOE)	People's Party (PP)
**Donostia-San Sebastián**	183,308	Spanish Socialist Workers' Party (PSOE)	Spanish Socialist Workers' Party (PSOE)
Dos Hermanas	114,672	Spanish Socialist Workers' Party (PSOE)	Spanish Socialist Workers' Party (PSOE)
El Ejido	75,969	Party of Almería (PdeAL)	Party of Almería (PdeAL)
El Puerto de Santa María	83,101	Portuese Independents (IP)	People's Party (PP)
Elche	219,032	Spanish Socialist Workers' Party (PSOE)	Spanish Socialist Workers' Party (PSOE)
Ferrol	76,399	People's Party (PP)	Spanish Socialist Workers' Party (PSOE)
Fuenlabrada	193,715	Spanish Socialist Workers' Party (PSOE)	Spanish Socialist Workers' Party (PSOE)
Gandía	74,827 (Note: Reached 75,000 in 2007.)	Spanish Socialist Workers' Party (PSOE)	Spanish Socialist Workers' Party (PSOE)
Getafe	156,320	Spanish Socialist Workers' Party (PSOE)	Spanish Socialist Workers' Party (PSOE)
Getxo	82,327	Basque Nationalist Party (EAJ/PNV)	Basque Nationalist Party (EAJ/PNV)
Gijón	274,472	Spanish Socialist Workers' Party (PSOE)	Spanish Socialist Workers' Party (PSOE)
**Girona**	89,890	Socialists' Party of Catalonia (PSC–PSOE)	Socialists' Party of Catalonia (PSC–PSOE)
**Granada**	237,929	People's Party (PP)	People's Party (PP)
**Guadalajara**	75,493	Spanish Socialist Workers' Party (PSOE)	People's Party (PP)
**Huelva**	145,763	People's Party (PP)	People's Party (PP)
**Huesca**	49,312	Spanish Socialist Workers' Party (PSOE)	Spanish Socialist Workers' Party (PSOE)
**Jaén**	116,769	People's Party (PP)	Spanish Socialist Workers' Party (PSOE)
Jerez de la Frontera	199,544	Spanish Socialist Workers' Party (PSOE)	Spanish Socialist Workers' Party (PSOE)
L'Hospitalet de Llobregat	248,150	Socialists' Party of Catalonia (PSC–PSOE)	Socialists' Party of Catalonia (PSC–PSOE)
**Las Palmas de Gran Canaria**	377,056	People's Party (PP)	Spanish Socialist Workers' Party (PSOE)
Las Rozas de Madrid	75,719	People's Party (PP)	People's Party (PP)
Leganés	182,471	Spanish Socialist Workers' Party (PSOE)	People's Party (PP) (PSOE in 2007)
**León**	136,985	People's Party (PP)	Spanish Socialist Workers' Party (PSOE)
**Lleida**	125,677	Socialists' Party of Catalonia (PSC–PSOE)	Socialists' Party of Catalonia (PSC–PSOE)
**Logroño**	147,036	People's Party (PP)	Spanish Socialist Workers' Party (PSOE)
**Lorca**	89,936	Spanish Socialist Workers' Party (PSOE)	People's Party (PP)
**Lugo**	93,450	Spanish Socialist Workers' Party (PSOE)	Spanish Socialist Workers' Party (PSOE)
**Madrid**	3,128,600	People's Party (PP)	People's Party (PP)
**Málaga**	560,631	People's Party (PP)	People's Party (PP)
Marbella	125,519	Spanish Socialist Workers' Party (PSOE)	People's Party (PP)
Mataró	118,748	Socialists' Party of Catalonia (PSC–PSOE)	Socialists' Party of Catalonia (PSC–PSOE)
Móstoles	206,301	People's Party (PP)	People's Party (PP)
**Murcia**	416,996	People's Party (PP)	People's Party (PP)
Orihuela	77,979	People's Party (PP)	People's Party (PP)
**Ourense**	108,137	People's Party (PP)	Spanish Socialist Workers' Party (PSOE)
**Oviedo**	214,883	People's Party (PP)	People's Party (PP)
**Palencia**	82,263	Spanish Socialist Workers' Party (PSOE)	Spanish Socialist Workers' Party (PSOE)
**Palma de Mallorca**	375,048	People's Party (PP)	Spanish Socialist Workers' Party (PSOE)
**Pamplona**	195,769	Navarrese People's Union (UPN)	Navarrese People's Union (UPN)
Parla	95,087	Spanish Socialist Workers' Party (PSOE)	Spanish Socialist Workers' Party (PSOE)
**Pontevedra**	80,096	Galician Nationalist Bloc (BNG)	Galician Nationalist Bloc (BNG)
Pozuelo de Alarcón	79,581	People's Party (PP)	People's Party (PP)
Reus	101,767	Socialists' Party of Catalonia (PSC–PSOE)	Socialists' Party of Catalonia (PSC–PSOE)
Sabadell	200,545	Socialists' Party of Catalonia (PSC–PSOE)	Socialists' Party of Catalonia (PSC–PSOE)
**Salamanca**	159,754	People's Party (PP)	People's Party (PP)
San Cristóbal de La Laguna	142,161	Canarian Coalition (CC)	Canarian Coalition (CC)
San Fernando	93,544	Andalusian Party (PA)	Andalusian Party (PA)
Sant Boi de Llobregat	81,368	Socialists' Party of Catalonia (PSC–PSOE)	Socialists' Party of Catalonia (PSC–PSOE)
Santa Coloma de Gramenet	119,056	Socialists' Party of Catalonia (PSC–PSOE)	Socialists' Party of Catalonia (PSC–PSOE)
**Santa Cruz de Tenerife**	223,148	Canarian Coalition (CC)	Canarian Coalition (CC)
**Santander**	182,926	People's Party (PP)	People's Party (PP)
Santiago de Compostela	93,458	Spanish Socialist Workers' Party (PSOE)	Spanish Socialist Workers' Party (PSOE)
**Segovia**	55,476	Spanish Socialist Workers' Party (PSOE)	Spanish Socialist Workers' Party (PSOE)
**Seville**	704,414	Spanish Socialist Workers' Party (PSOE)	Spanish Socialist Workers' Party (PSOE)
**Soria**	38,004	People's Party (PP)	Spanish Socialist Workers' Party (PSOE)
Talavera de la Reina	83,793	Spanish Socialist Workers' Party (PSOE)	Spanish Socialist Workers' Party (PSOE)
**Tarragona**	131,158	Convergence and Union (CiU)	Socialists' Party of Catalonia (PSC–PSOE)
Telde	97,525	People's Party (PP)	New Canaries (NC)
Terrassa	199,817	Socialists' Party of Catalonia (PSC–PSOE)	Socialists' Party of Catalonia (PSC–PSOE)
**Teruel**	33,673	Spanish Socialist Workers' Party (PSOE)	Aragonese Party (PAR) (PP in 2010)
**Toledo**	77,601	People's Party (PP)	Spanish Socialist Workers' Party (PSOE)
Torrejón de Ardoz	112,114	Spanish Socialist Workers' Party (PSOE)	People's Party (PP)
Torrent	74,616 (Note: Reached 75,000 in 2007.)	Spanish Socialist Workers' Party (PSOE)	People's Party (PP)
Torrevieja	92,034	People's Party (PP)	People's Party (PP)
**Valencia**	805,304	People's Party (PP)	People's Party (PP)
**Valladolid**	319,943	People's Party (PP)	People's Party (PP)
Vigo	293,255	People's Party (PP)	Spanish Socialist Workers' Party (PSOE)
**Vitoria-Gasteiz**	227,568	People's Party (PP)	Spanish Socialist Workers' Party (PSOE)
**Zamora**	66,135	People's Party (PP)	People's Party (PP)
**Zaragoza**	646,546	Spanish Socialist Workers' Party (PSOE)	Spanish Socialist Workers' Party (PSOE)

==== Autonomous cities ====
The following table lists party control in the autonomous cities. Gains for a party are highlighted in that party's colour.

City	Population	Previous control	New control
Ceuta	75,861	People's Party (PP)	People's Party (PP)
Melilla	66,871	People's Party (PP)	People's Party (PP)

=== Provincial and island ===
==== Summary ====
← Summary of the 27 May 2007 Spanish provincial and island election results →
Parties and alliances	Seats				
Parties and alliances	PD	IC	FD	Total	+/−
Spanish Socialist Workers' Party (PSOE)^{1}	465	81	44	**590**	+30
People's Party (PP)	438	63	29	**530**	+3
Canarian Coalition–Canarian Nationalist Party (CC–PNC)	—	54	—	**54**	−3
Canarian Coalition–Canarian Nationalist Party (CC–PNC)^{2}	—	46	—	46	−3
Independent Herrenian Group (AHI)	—	7	—	7	±0
Canarian Nationalist Party (PNC)	—	1	—	1	±0
Basque Nationalist Party (EAJ/PNV)^{3}	—	—	53	**53**	+1
Convergence and Union (CiU)	51	—	—	**51**	+1
United Left (IU)	29	0	12	**41**	−8
United Left (IU)^{4}	25	0	—	25	−5
United Left–Greens–Aralar (EB–B–Aralar)^{5}	—	—	12	12	+2
Initiative–EUiA–Agreement for Municipal Progress (ICV–EUiA–EPM)	4	—	—	4	−5
Galician Nationalist Bloc (BNG)	17	—	—	**17**	+2
Republican Left of Catalonia–Municipal Agreement (ERC–AM)	13	—	—	**13**	±0
Aragonese Party (PAR)	11	—	—	**11**	+2
Basque Solidarity (EA)^{3}	—	—	10	**10**	−11
Canarian Centre (CCN)	—	7	—	**7**	−3
Lanzarote Independents Party (PIL)	—	6	—	6	−2
Canarian Centre (CCN)^{6}	—	1	—	1	−1
New Canaries (NCa)	—	6	—	**6**	+6
Basque Nationalist Action (EAE/ANV)	—	—	5	**5**	+5
People for Formentera (GxF)	—	5	—	**5**	+5
Andalusian Party (PA)	4	—	—	**4**	−3
Aragonese Union (CHA)	3	—	—	**3**	−1
Bloc for Mallorca (PSM–EN, EU–EV, ERC)^{7}	—	3	—	**3**	−2
Majorcan Union (UM)	—	3	—	**3**	±0
Party of Almería (PdeAL)	2	—	—	**2**	+2
Independents of Formentera Group (GUIF)	—	2	—	**2**	+2
Valencian Nationalist Bloc–The Greens Ecologist Left (Bloc–EVEE)	1	—	—	**1**	±0
Leonese People's Union (UPL)	1	—	—	**1**	−1
Independent Solution (SI)	1	—	—	**1**	±0
Zamoran Independent Electors–Zamoran People's Union (ADEIZA–UPZ)	1	—	—	**1**	+1
Initiative for the Development of Soria (IDES)	1	—	—	**1**	±0
PSM–Nationalist Agreement–The Greens of Menorca (PSM–EN, EV–Me)	—	1	—	**1**	±0
Socialist Party of Andalusia (PSA)	0	—	—	0	−2
Valencian Union (UV)	0	—	—	0	−1
Independent Group for Almería (GIAL)	0	—	—	0	−1
25 May Citizens' Alternative (AC25M)	—	0	—	0	−1
Liberal Independent Group (GIL)	n/a	n/a	n/a	0	−1
Alavese Unity (UA)	n/a	n/a	n/a	0	−1
Independent Popular Council of Formentera (AIPF)	n/a	n/a	n/a	0	−1
Independents (INDEP)	0	0	0	0	−1
**Total**	**1,038**	**225**	**153**	**1,416**	**+19**
Sources
Footnotes: ^{1} Spanish Socialist Workers' Party results are compared to the combined totals of Spanish Socialist Workers' Party and Progressive Pact totals in the 2003 elections.; ^{2} Canarian Coalition–Canarian Nationalist Party results are compared to Canarian Coalition totals in the 2003 elections.; ^{3} Within the Basque Nationalist Party–Basque Solidarity alliance in the 2003 elections.; ^{4} United Left does not include results in the Basque Country and Mallorca.; ^{5} United Left–Greens–Aralar results are compared to the combined totals of United Left (in the Basque Country) and Aralar in the 2003 elections.; ^{6} Canarian Centre results are compared to Independents of Fuerteventura totals in the 2003 elections.; ^{7} Bloc for Mallorca results are compared to the combined totals of Socialist Party of Mallorca–Nationalist Agreement and United Left (in Mallorca) in the 2003 elections.

==== Indirectly-elected ====
The following table lists party control in the indirectly-elected provincial deputations. Gains for a party are highlighted in that party's colour.

Province	Population	Previous control	New control
A Coruña	1,129,141	Spanish Socialist Workers' Party (PSOE)	Spanish Socialist Workers' Party (PSOE)
Albacete	387,658	Spanish Socialist Workers' Party (PSOE)	Spanish Socialist Workers' Party (PSOE)
Alicante	1,783,555	People's Party (PP)	People's Party (PP)
Almería	635,850	People's Party (PP)	Spanish Socialist Workers' Party (PSOE)
Ávila	167,818	People's Party (PP)	People's Party (PP)
Badajoz	673,474	Spanish Socialist Workers' Party (PSOE)	Spanish Socialist Workers' Party (PSOE)
Barcelona	5,309,404	Socialists' Party of Catalonia (PSC–PSOE)	Socialists' Party of Catalonia (PSC–PSOE)
Burgos	362,964	People's Party (PP)	People's Party (PP)
Cáceres	412,899	Spanish Socialist Workers' Party (PSOE)	Spanish Socialist Workers' Party (PSOE)
Cádiz	1,194,062	Spanish Socialist Workers' Party (PSOE)	Spanish Socialist Workers' Party (PSOE)
Castellón	559,761	People's Party (PP)	People's Party (PP)
Ciudad Real	506,864	Spanish Socialist Workers' Party (PSOE)	Spanish Socialist Workers' Party (PSOE)
Córdoba	788,287	Spanish Socialist Workers' Party (PSOE)	Spanish Socialist Workers' Party (PSOE)
Cuenca	208,616	Spanish Socialist Workers' Party (PSOE)	Spanish Socialist Workers' Party (PSOE)
Girona	687,331	Convergence and Union (CiU)	Republican Left of Catalonia (ERC)
Granada	876,184	Spanish Socialist Workers' Party (PSOE)	Spanish Socialist Workers' Party (PSOE)
Guadalajara	213,505	Spanish Socialist Workers' Party (PSOE)	Spanish Socialist Workers' Party (PSOE)
Huelva	492,174	Spanish Socialist Workers' Party (PSOE)	Spanish Socialist Workers' Party (PSOE)
Huesca	218,023	Spanish Socialist Workers' Party (PSOE)	Spanish Socialist Workers' Party (PSOE)
Jaén	662,751	Spanish Socialist Workers' Party (PSOE)	Spanish Socialist Workers' Party (PSOE)
León	498,223	People's Party (PP)	People's Party (PP)
Lleida	407,496	Convergence and Union (CiU)	Republican Left of Catalonia (ERC)
Lugo	356,595	People's Party (PP)	Spanish Socialist Workers' Party (PSOE)
Málaga	1,491,287	Spanish Socialist Workers' Party (PSOE)	Spanish Socialist Workers' Party (PSOE)
Ourense	338,671	People's Party (PP)	People's Party (PP)
Palencia	173,153	People's Party (PP)	People's Party (PP)
Pontevedra	943,117	People's Party (PP)	People's Party (PP)
Salamanca	353,110	People's Party (PP)	People's Party (PP)
Segovia	156,598	People's Party (PP)	People's Party (PP)
Seville	1,835,077	Spanish Socialist Workers' Party (PSOE)	Spanish Socialist Workers' Party (PSOE)
Soria	93,431	People's Party (PP)	People's Party (PP)
Tarragona	730,466	Convergence and Union (CiU)	Convergence and Union (CiU)
Teruel	142,160	Spanish Socialist Workers' Party (PSOE)	Spanish Socialist Workers' Party (PSOE)
Toledo	615,618	Spanish Socialist Workers' Party (PSOE)	Spanish Socialist Workers' Party (PSOE)
Valencia	2,463,592	People's Party (PP)	People's Party (PP)
Valladolid	519,249	People's Party (PP)	People's Party (PP)
Zamora	197,492	People's Party (PP)	People's Party (PP)
Zaragoza	917,288	Spanish Socialist Workers' Party (PSOE)	Spanish Socialist Workers' Party (PSOE)

==== Island councils ====
The following table lists party control in the island councils. Gains for a party are highlighted in that party's colour.

Island	Population	Previous control	New control
El Hierro	10,688	Independent Herrenian Group (AHI)	Independent Herrenian Group (AHI)
Formentera	7,957	→ Newly-established	People for Formentera (GxF)
Fuerteventura	89,680	Canarian Coalition–Canarian Nationalist Party (CC–PNC)	Canarian Coalition–Canarian Nationalist Party (CC–PNC)
Gran Canaria	807,049	People's Party (PP)	Spanish Socialist Workers' Party (PSOE)
Ibiza	113,908	People's Party (PP)	Spanish Socialist Workers' Party (PSOE)
La Gomera	21,952	Spanish Socialist Workers' Party (PSOE)	Spanish Socialist Workers' Party (PSOE)
La Palma	86,062	Canarian Coalition–Canarian Nationalist Party (CC–PNC)	Canarian Coalition–Canarian Nationalist Party (CC–PNC)
Lanzarote	127,457	Canarian Coalition–Canarian Nationalist Party (CC–PNC)	Spanish Socialist Workers' Party (PSOE) (CC–PNC in 2009)
Mallorca	790,763	Majorcan Union (UM)	Spanish Socialist Workers' Party (PSOE)
Menorca	88,434	Spanish Socialist Workers' Party (PSOE)	Spanish Socialist Workers' Party (PSOE)
Tenerife	852,945	Canarian Coalition–Canarian Nationalist Party (CC–PNC)	Canarian Coalition–Canarian Nationalist Party (CC–PNC)

==== Foral deputations ====
The following table lists party control in the foral deputations. Gains for a party are highlighted in that party's colour.

Province	Population	Previous control	New control
Álava	301,926	People's Party (PP)	Basque Nationalist Party (EAJ/PNV)
Biscay	1,139,863	Basque Nationalist Party (EAJ/PNV)	Basque Nationalist Party (EAJ/PNV)
Guipúzcoa	691,895	Basque Nationalist Party (EAJ/PNV)	Basque Nationalist Party (EAJ/PNV)

== Bibliography ==
- Constitución Española (Constitution). Official State Gazette (in Spanish). 27 December 1978 [version as of 28 August 1992]. BOE-A-1978-31229.
- Ley Orgánica 10/1982, de 10 de agosto, de Estatuto de Autonomía de Canarias (Organic Law 10/1982). Official State Gazette (in Spanish). 10 August 1982 [version as of 2 July 2002]. BOE-A-1982-20821.
- Ley 27/1983, de 25 de noviembre, de Relaciones entre las Instituciones Comunes de la Comunidad Autónoma y los Órganos Forales de sus Territorios Históricos (Law 27/1983). Official State Gazette (in Spanish). 25 November 1983 [version as of 19 July 2006]. BOE-A-2012-5193.
- Ley 7/1985, de 2 de abril, Reguladora de las Bases del Régimen Local (Law 7/1985). Official State Gazette (in Spanish). 2 April 1985 [version as of 13 April 2007]. BOE-A-1985-5392.
- Ley Orgánica 5/1985, de 19 de junio, del Régimen Electoral General (Organic Law 5/1985). Official State Gazette (in Spanish). 19 June 1985 [version as of 20 April 2007]. BOE-A-1985-11672.
- Ley 8/1986, de 26 de noviembre, Electoral de la Comunidad Autónoma de las Islas Baleares (Law 8/1986). Official State Gazette (in Spanish). 26 November 1986 [version as of 3 November 2006]. BOE-A-1987-2903.
- Ley 1/1987, de 27 de marzo, de Elecciones para las Juntas Generales de los Territorios Históricos de Araba, Bizkaia y Gipuzkoa (Law 1/1987). Official State Gazette (in Spanish). 27 March 1987 [version as of 2 March 2005]. BOE-A-2012-3948.
- Ley 14/1990, de 26 de julio, de Régimen Jurídico de las Administraciones Públicas de Canarias (Law 14/1990). Official State Gazette (in Spanish). 26 July 1990 [version as of 14 December 2001]. BOE-A-1990-23140.
- Ley 8/2000, de 27 de octubre, de Consejos Insulares (Law 8/2000). Official State Gazette (in Spanish). 27 October 2000 [version as of 1 June 2001]. BOE-A-2000-20977.
- Ley Orgánica 1/2007, de 28 de febrero, de reforma del Estatuto de Autonomía de las Illes Balears (Organic Law 1/2007). Official State Gazette (in Spanish). 28 February 2007 [version as of 10 March 2007]. BOE-A-2007-4233.
- Real Decreto 444/2007, de 2 de abril, por el que se convocan elecciones locales y a las Asambleas de Ceuta y Melilla, para el 27 de mayo de 2007 (Royal Decree 444/2007). Official State Gazette (in Spanish). 2 April 2007. BOE-A-2007-7018.
- Real Decreto 1137/2007, de 31 de agosto, por el que se convocan elecciones locales parciales (Royal Decree 1137/2007). Official State Gazette (in Spanish). 31 August 2007. BOE-A-2007-15951.
