= 1999 Spanish local elections in Galicia =

This article presents the results breakdown of the local elections held in Galicia on 13 June 1999. The following tables show detailed results in the autonomous community's most populous municipalities, sorted alphabetically.

== City control ==
The following table lists party control in the most populous municipalities, including provincial capitals (highlighted in bold). Gains for a party are highlighted in that party's colour.

Municipality	Population	Previous control	New control
**A Coruña**	243,134	Socialists' Party of Galicia (PSdeG–PSOE)	Socialists' Party of Galicia (PSdeG–PSOE)
Ferrol	82,548	People's Party (PP)	Galician Nationalist Bloc (BNG)
**Lugo**	86,620	People's Party (PP)	Socialists' Party of Galicia (PSdeG–PSOE)
**Ourense**	107,965	People's Party (PP)	People's Party (PP)
**Pontevedra**	73,871	People's Party (PP)	Galician Nationalist Bloc (BNG)
Santiago de Compostela	93,584	Socialists' Party of Galicia (PSdeG–PSOE)	Socialists' Party of Galicia (PSdeG–PSOE)
Vigo	283,110	People's Party (PP)	Galician Nationalist Bloc (BNG)

== Municipalities ==
=== A Coruña ===
Population: 243,134

← Summary of the 13 June 1999 City Council of A Coruña election results →
Parties and alliances	Popular vote			Seats	
Parties and alliances	Votes	%	±pp	Total	+/−
Socialists' Party of Galicia (PSdeG–PSOE)	66,911	56.34	+4.82	**17**	+2
People's Party (PP)	29,321	24.69	−11.62	**7**	−3
Galician Nationalist Bloc (BNG)	15,460	13.02	+5.09	**3**	+1
United Left (EU–IU)	1,583	1.33	−1.30	0	±0
Galician Democracy (DG)	743	0.63	New	0	±0
Left of Galicia–The Greens (EdeG–OV)	615	0.52	New	0	±0
Party of Self-employed and Professionals (AUTONOMO)	530	0.45	New	0	±0
Humanist Party (PH)	280	0.24	+0.02	0	±0
Spanish Democratic Party (PADE)	213	0.18	New	0	±0
Blank ballots	3,117	2.62	+1.24		
**Total**	**118,773**			**27**	**±0**
Valid votes	118,773	99.24	−0.41		
Invalid votes	912	0.76	+0.41		
**Votes cast / turnout**	**119,685**	**55.76**	**−7.48**		
Abstentions	94,965	44.24	+7.48		
**Registered voters**	**214,650**				

=== Ferrol ===
Population: 82,548

← Summary of the 13 June 1999 City Council of Ferrol election results →
Parties and alliances	Popular vote			Seats	
Parties and alliances	Votes	%	±pp	Total	+/−
People's Party (PP)	12,916	32.37	+1.84	**9**	+1
Galician Nationalist Bloc (BNG)	11,148	27.94	+16.38	**8**	+5
Socialists' Party of Galicia (PSdeG–PSOE)	7,072	17.73	−4.93	**5**	−1
Independents for Ferrol (IF)	4,370	10.95	−9.26	**3**	−2
United Left (EU–IU)	1,877	4.70	−7.33	0	−3
Galician Democracy (DG)	1,166	2.92	New	0	±0
Party of Self-employed and Professionals (AUTONOMO)	354	0.89	New	0	±0
Humanist Party (PH)	55	0.14	New	0	±0
Blank ballots	938	2.35	+0.86		
**Total**	**39,896**			**25**	**±0**
Valid votes	39,896	99.29	−0.24		
Invalid votes	285	0.71	+0.24		
**Votes cast / turnout**	**40,181**	**57.19**	**−5.96**		
Abstentions	30,080	42.81	+5.96		
**Registered voters**	**70,261**				

=== Lugo ===
Population: 86,620

← Summary of the 13 June 1999 City Council of Lugo election results →
Parties and alliances	Popular vote			Seats	
Parties and alliances	Votes	%	±pp	Total	+/−
People's Party (PP)	19,000	42.10	−4.43	**12**	−1
Socialists' Party of Galicia (PSdeG–PSOE)	10,461	23.18	+3.60	**7**	+2
Galician Nationalist Bloc (BNG)	9,346	20.71	+6.16	**6**	+2
United Left (EU–IU)	1,868	4.14	−9.42	0	−3
Independents of Lugo (IN–LU)	1,443	3.20	New	0	±0
Galician Democracy (DG)	1,127	2.50	New	0	±0
Left of Galicia–The Greens (EdeG–OV)	833	1.85	New	0	±0
Humanist Party (PH)	69	0.15	New	0	±0
Blank ballots	982	2.18	+0.22		
**Total**	**45,129**			**25**	**±0**
Valid votes	45,129	99.03	−0.39		
Invalid votes	444	0.97	+0.39		
**Votes cast / turnout**	**45,573**	**61.07**	**−3.69**		
Abstentions	29,050	38.93	+3.69		
**Registered voters**	**74,623**				

=== Ourense ===
Population: 107,965

← Summary of the 13 June 1999 City Council of Ourense election results →
Parties and alliances	Popular vote			Seats	
Parties and alliances	Votes	%	±pp	Total	+/−
People's Party (PP)	26,786	47.58	+1.57	**14**	±0
Galician Nationalist Bloc (BNG)	12,519	22.24	+1.55	**7**	+1
Socialists' Party of Galicia (PSdeG–PSOE)	11,180	19.86	−3.97	**6**	−1
Ourensan Unity (UO)	1,987	3.53	New	0	±0
Left of Galicia–The Greens (EdeG–OV)	878	1.56	New	0	±0
Galician Coalition (CG)	791	1.41	−0.44	0	±0
United Left (EU–IU)	671	1.19	−2.51	0	±0
Galician Democracy (DG)	289	0.51	New	0	±0
Humanist Party (PH)	70	0.12	New	0	±0
Blank ballots	1,124	2.00	+0.62		
**Total**	**56,295**			**27**	**±0**
Valid votes	56,295	98.71	−0.78		
Invalid votes	734	1.29	+0.78		
**Votes cast / turnout**	**57,029**	**56.99**	**−9.20**		
Abstentions	43,043	43.01	+9.20		
**Registered voters**	**100,072**				

=== Pontevedra ===
Population: 73,871

← Summary of the 13 June 1999 City Council of Pontevedra election results →
Parties and alliances	Popular vote			Seats	
Parties and alliances	Votes	%	±pp	Total	+/−
People's Party (PP)	15,505	38.92	−2.85	**10**	−1
Galician Nationalist Bloc (BNG)	14,887	37.37	+11.97	**10**	+3
Socialists' Party of Galicia (PSdeG–PSOE)	7,118	17.87	−1.37	**5**	±0
Centrist Union–Democratic and Social Centre (UC–CDS)	465	1.17	New	0	±0
United Left (EU–IU)	449	1.13	−0.73	0	±0
Left of Galicia–The Greens (EdeG–OV)	308	0.77	New	0	±0
Galician Democracy (DG)	233	0.58	New	0	±0
Humanist Party (PH)	52	0.13	New	0	±0
United Pontevedra (PU)	n/a	n/a	−8.79	0	−2
Blank ballots	824	2.07	+0.04		
**Total**	**39,841**			**25**	**±0**
Valid votes	39,841	99.29	−0.24		
Invalid votes	286	0.71	+0.24		
**Votes cast / turnout**	**40,127**	**61.76**	**−1.99**		
Abstentions	24,848	38.24	+1.99		
**Registered voters**	**64,975**				

=== Santiago de Compostela ===
Population: 93,584

← Summary of the 13 June 1999 City Council of Santiago de Compostela election results →
Parties and alliances	Popular vote			Seats	
Parties and alliances	Votes	%	±pp	Total	+/−
People's Party (PP)	20,901	42.86	+2.73	**11**	±0
Socialists' Party of Galicia (PSdeG–PSOE)	16,208	33.24	−11.64	**9**	−3
Galician Nationalist Bloc (BNG)	8,780	18.00	+8.74	**5**	+3
Galician Democracy (DG)	974	2.00	New	0	±0
Independents of Santiago de Compostela (ISC)	325	0.67	New	0	±0
United Left (EU–IU)	242	0.50	−2.78	0	±0
Left of Galicia–The Greens (EdeG–OV)	233	0.48	New	0	±0
Humanist Party (PH)	56	0.11	New	0	±0
Blank ballots	1,047	2.15	+0.54		
**Total**	**48,766**			**25**	**±0**
Valid votes	48,766	99.21	−0.24		
Invalid votes	386	0.79	+0.24		
**Votes cast / turnout**	**49,152**	**59.36**	**−7.18**		
Abstentions	33,649	40.64	+7.18		
**Registered voters**	**82,801**				

=== Vigo ===
Population: 283,110

← Summary of the 13 June 1999 City Council of Vigo election results →
Parties and alliances	Popular vote			Seats	
Parties and alliances	Votes	%	±pp	Total	+/−
People's Party (PP)	50,565	36.71	−9.46	**11**	−4
Galician Nationalist Bloc (BNG)	34,192	24.83	+12.09	**8**	+4
Socialists' Party of Galicia (PSdeG–PSOE)	32,314	23.46	−1.86	**7**	−1
Viguese Progressives (PROVI)	7,966	5.78	New	**1**	+1
Galician Union (UGA)	4,605	3.34	New	0	±0
United Left (EU–IU)	2,102	1.53	−3.32	0	±0
Left of Galicia–The Greens (EdeG–OV)	1,073	0.78	New	0	±0
Humanist Party (PH)	565	0.41	+0.28	0	±0
Galician Democracy (DG)	378	0.27	New	0	±0
Social Democratic Party of Law (SDD)	108	0.08	New	0	±0
Blank ballots	3,859	2.80	+0.94		
**Total**	**137,727**			**27**	**±0**
Valid votes	137,727	99.21	−0.30		
Invalid votes	1,099	0.79	+0.30		
**Votes cast / turnout**	**138,826**	**58.43**	**−7.12**		
Abstentions	98,762	41.57	+7.12		
**Registered voters**	**237,588**				
