= 1995 Spanish local elections in Galicia =

This article presents the results breakdown of the local elections held in Galicia on 28 May 1995. The following tables show detailed results in the autonomous community's most populous municipalities, sorted alphabetically.

== City control ==
The following table lists party control in the most populous municipalities, including provincial capitals (highlighted in bold). Gains for a party are highlighted in that party's colour.

Municipality	Population	Previous control	New control
**A Coruña**	255,087	Socialists' Party of Galicia (PSdeG–PSOE)	Socialists' Party of Galicia (PSdeG–PSOE)
Ferrol	85,692	Socialists' Party of Galicia (PSdeG–PSOE)	People's Party (PP)
**Lugo**	87,305	People's Party (PP)	People's Party (PP)
**Ourense**	108,547	Socialists' Party of Galicia (PSdeG–PSOE)	People's Party (PP)
**Pontevedra**	76,461	People's Party (PP)	People's Party (PP)
Santiago de Compostela	93,398	Socialists' Party of Galicia (PSdeG–PSOE)	Socialists' Party of Galicia (PSdeG–PSOE)
Vigo	288,573	Socialists' Party of Galicia (PSdeG–PSOE)	People's Party (PP)

== Municipalities ==
=== A Coruña ===
Population: 255,087

← Summary of the 28 May 1995 City Council of A Coruña election results →
Parties and alliances	Popular vote			Seats	
Parties and alliances	Votes	%	±pp	Total	+/−
Socialists' Party of Galicia (PSdeG–PSOE)	69,705	51.52	−7.74	**15**	−3
People's Party (PP)	49,135	36.31	+7.45	**10**	+1
Galician Nationalist Bloc (BNG)	10,735	7.93	+3.12	**2**	+2
United Left–Galician Left (EU–EG)	3,560	2.63	+0.74	0	±0
Humanist Platform (PH)^{1}	298	0.22	−0.29	0	±0
Blank ballots	1,874	1.38	+0.41		
**Total**	**135,307**			**27**	**±0**
Valid votes	135,307	99.65	−0.08		
Invalid votes	478	0.35	+0.08		
**Votes cast / turnout**	**135,785**	**63.24**	**+6.69**		
Abstentions	78,926	36.76	−6.69		
**Registered voters**	**214,711**				
Sources
Footnotes: ^{1} Humanist Platform results are compared to The Greens Ecologist–Humanist List totals in the 1991 election.

=== Ferrol ===
Population: 85,692

← Summary of the 28 May 1995 City Council of Ferrol election results →
Parties and alliances	Popular vote			Seats	
Parties and alliances	Votes	%	±pp	Total	+/−
People's Party (PP)	13,545	30.53	−7.52	**8**	−2
Socialists' Party of Galicia (PSdeG–PSOE)	10,052	22.66	−6.67	**6**	−2
Independents for Ferrol (IF)	8,966	20.21	New	**5**	+5
United Left–Galician Left (EU–EG)	5,336	12.03	−5.39	**3**	−2
Galician Nationalist Bloc (BNG)	5,129	11.56	+4.55	**3**	+1
Galician Alternative (AG)	675	1.52	New	0	±0
Blank ballots	661	1.49	+0.19		
**Total**	**44,364**			**25**	**±0**
Valid votes	44,364	99.53	−0.06		
Invalid votes	210	0.47	+0.06		
**Votes cast / turnout**	**44,574**	**63.15**	**+11.17**		
Abstentions	26,008	36.85	−11.17		
**Registered voters**	**70,582**				

=== Lugo ===
Population: 87,305

← Summary of the 28 May 1995 City Council of Lugo election results →
Parties and alliances	Popular vote			Seats	
Parties and alliances	Votes	%	±pp	Total	+/−
People's Party (PP)	21,581	46.53	+5.06	**13**	+1
Socialists' Party of Galicia (PSdeG–PSOE)	9,080	19.58	−4.99	**5**	−2
Galician Nationalist Bloc (BNG)	6,750	14.55	+7.19	**4**	+2
United Left–Galician Left (EU–EG)	6,291	13.56	+7.69	**3**	+2
Galician Nationalist Convergence (CNG)	1,767	3.81	−6.22	0	−3
Blank ballots	910	1.96	+0.66		
**Total**	**46,379**			**25**	**±0**
Valid votes	46,379	99.42	−0.06		
Invalid votes	271	0.58	+0.06		
**Votes cast / turnout**	**46,650**	**64.76**	**+6.08**		
Abstentions	25,384	35.24	−6.08		
**Registered voters**	**72,034**				

=== Ourense ===
Population: 108,547

← Summary of the 28 May 1995 City Council of Ourense election results →
Parties and alliances	Popular vote			Seats	
Parties and alliances	Votes	%	±pp	Total	+/−
People's Party (PP)	26,513	46.01	+14.31	**14**	+4
Socialists' Party of Galicia (PSdeG–PSOE)	13,732	23.83	−12.59	**7**	−5
Galician Nationalist Bloc (BNG)	11,921	20.69	+14.35	**6**	+4
United Left–Galician Left (EU–EG)	2,134	3.70	+0.74	0	±0
Galician Coalition (CG)^{1}	1,064	1.85	−9.56	0	−3
Platform of Independents of Spain (PIE)	923	1.60	New	0	±0
Independent Electors' Group of Orense (ADEI–O)	262	0.45	−1.07	0	±0
The Greens of Galicia (OVG)	253	0.44	+0.02	0	±0
Humanist Platform (PH)^{2}	28	0.05	−0.22	0	±0
Blank ballots	795	1.38	+0.32		
**Total**	**57,625**			**27**	**±0**
Valid votes	57,625	99.49	+0.25		
Invalid votes	295	0.51	−0.25		
**Votes cast / turnout**	**57,920**	**66.19**	**+9.96**		
Abstentions	29,585	33.81	−9.96		
**Registered voters**	**87,505**				
Sources
Footnotes: ^{1} Galician Coalition results are compared to Centrist Convergence–Democratic and Social Centre totals in the 1991 election.; ^{2} Humanist Platform results are compared to The Greens Ecologist–Humanist List totals in the 1991 election.

=== Pontevedra ===
Population: 76,461

← Summary of the 28 May 1995 City Council of Pontevedra election results →
Parties and alliances	Popular vote			Seats	
Parties and alliances	Votes	%	±pp	Total	+/−
People's Party (PP)	15,979	41.77	+1.76	**11**	−1
Galician Nationalist Bloc (BNG)	9,719	25.40	+11.88	**7**	+3
Socialists' Party of Galicia (PSdeG–PSOE)	7,361	19.24	−3.16	**5**	−1
United Pontevedra (PU)	3,363	8.79	+4.19	**2**	+2
United Left–Galician Left (EU–EG)	713	1.86	+0.86	0	±0
The Greens of Galicia (OVG)	346	0.90	New	0	±0
Galician Nationalist Convergence (CNG)	n/a	n/a	−10.66	0	−3
Blank ballots	778	2.03	+0.83		
**Total**	**38,259**			**25**	**±0**
Valid votes	38,259	99.53	+0.32		
Invalid votes	179	0.47	−0.32		
**Votes cast / turnout**	**38,438**	**63.75**	**+4.58**		
Abstentions	21,858	36.25	−4.58		
**Registered voters**	**60,296**				

=== Santiago de Compostela ===
Population: 93,398

← Summary of the 28 May 1995 City Council of Santiago de Compostela election results →
Parties and alliances	Popular vote			Seats	
Parties and alliances	Votes	%	±pp	Total	+/−
Socialists' Party of Galicia (PSdeG–PSOE)	22,131	44.88	+2.36	**12**	−1
People's Party (PP)	19,790	40.13	+1.77	**11**	±0
Galician Nationalist Bloc (BNG)	4,566	9.26	+3.76	**2**	+1
United Left–Galician Left (EU–EG)	1,618	3.28	+1.50	0	±0
The Greens of Galicia (OVG)	414	0.84	New	0	±0
Blank ballots	792	1.61	+0.52		
**Total**	**49,311**			**25**	**±0**
Valid votes	49,311	99.45	−0.12		
Invalid votes	271	0.55	+0.12		
**Votes cast / turnout**	**49,582**	**66.54**	**+6.56**		
Abstentions	24,934	33.46	−6.56		
**Registered voters**	**74,516**				

=== Vigo ===
Population: 288,573

← Summary of the 28 May 1995 City Council of Vigo election results →
Parties and alliances	Popular vote			Seats	
Parties and alliances	Votes	%	±pp	Total	+/−
People's Party (PP)	69,095	46.17	+4.36	**15**	+2
Socialists' Party of Galicia (PSdeG–PSOE)	37,890	25.32	−12.41	**8**	−3
Galician Nationalist Bloc (BNG)	19,061	12.74	+7.72	**4**	+3
United Left–Galician Left (EU–EG)	7,257	4.85	+2.67	0	±0
Union of Independent Viguese (UVI)	6,518	4.36	New	0	±0
Solidarity and Local Integration Party: Neighbourhoods with Voice (PSIBV)	5,958	3.98	New	0	±0
Platform of Independents of Spain (PIE)	359	0.24	New	0	±0
Main Party of Galicia (PPGA)	213	0.14	New	0	±0
Humanist Platform (PH)^{1}	193	0.13	−0.54	0	±0
Galician People's Front (FPG)	190	0.13	New	0	±0
Spanish Phalanx of the CNSO (FE–JONS)	133	0.09	New	0	±0
Galician Socialist Party–Galician Left (PSG–EG)	n/a	n/a	−7.68	0	−2
Blank ballots	2,782	1.86	+0.58		
**Total**	**149,649**			**27**	**±0**
Valid votes	149,649	99.51	−0.01		
Invalid votes	733	0.49	+0.01		
**Votes cast / turnout**	**150,382**	**65.55**	**+6.61**		
Abstentions	79,025	34.45	−6.61		
**Registered voters**	**229,407**				
Sources
Footnotes: ^{1} Humanist Platform results are compared to The Greens Ecologist–Humanist List totals in the 1991 election.
