= 2007 Spanish local elections in the Basque Country =

This article presents the results breakdown of the local elections held in the Basque Country on 27 May 2007. The following tables show detailed results in the autonomous community's most populous municipalities, sorted alphabetically.

== City control ==
The following table lists party control in the most populous municipalities, including provincial capitals (shown in bold). Gains for a party are displayed with the cell's background shaded in that party's colour.

Municipality	Population	Previous control	New control
Barakaldo	95,640	Socialist Party of the Basque Country (PSE–EE (PSOE))	Socialist Party of the Basque Country (PSE–EE (PSOE))
Basauri	43,626	Basque Nationalist Party (EAJ/PNV)	Socialist Party of the Basque Country (PSE–EE (PSOE))
**Bilbao**	354,145	Basque Nationalist Party (EAJ/PNV)	Basque Nationalist Party (EAJ/PNV)
**Donostia-San Sebastián**	183,308	Socialist Party of the Basque Country (PSE–EE (PSOE))	Socialist Party of the Basque Country (PSE–EE (PSOE))
Errenteria	37,853	Socialist Party of the Basque Country (PSE–EE (PSOE))	Socialist Party of the Basque Country (PSE–EE (PSOE))
Getxo	82,327	Basque Nationalist Party (EAJ/PNV)	Basque Nationalist Party (EAJ/PNV)
Irun	60,261	Socialist Party of the Basque Country (PSE–EE (PSOE))	Socialist Party of the Basque Country (PSE–EE (PSOE))
Portugalete	49,118	Socialist Party of the Basque Country (PSE–EE (PSOE))	Socialist Party of the Basque Country (PSE–EE (PSOE))
Santurtzi	47,320	Socialist Party of the Basque Country (PSE–EE (PSOE))	Basque Nationalist Party (EAJ/PNV)
**Vitoria-Gasteiz**	227,568	People's Party (PP)	Socialist Party of the Basque Country (PSE–EE (PSOE))

== Municipalities ==
=== Barakaldo ===
Population: 95,640

← Summary of the 27 May 2007 City Council of Barakaldo election results →
Parties and alliances	Popular vote			Seats	
Parties and alliances	Votes	%	±pp	Total	+/−
Socialist Party of the Basque Country–Basque Country Left (PSE–EE (PSOE))	19,296	41.15	+7.11	11	+2
Basque Nationalist Party (EAJ/PNV)^{1}	9,785	20.87	n/a	5	−2
People's Party (PP)	7,714	16.45	−5.22	4	−1
Basque Nationalist Action (EAE/ANV)	4,936	10.53	New	3	+3
United Left–Greens (EB–B)^{2}	3,465	7.39	−5.10	2	−1
Basque Solidarity (EA)^{1}	950	2.03	n/a	0	−1
Blank ballots	747	1.59	−0.02		
Total	46,893			25	±0
Valid votes	46,893	99.09	+4.58		
Invalid votes	431	0.91	−4.58		
Votes cast / turnout	47,324	56.58	−7.95		
Abstentions	36,314	43.42	+7.95		
Registered voters	83,638				
Sources
Footnotes: ^{1} Within the Basque Nationalist Party–Basque Solidarity alliance in the 2003 election.; ^{2} United Left–Greens results are compared to United Left totals in the 2003 election.

=== Basauri ===
Population: 43,626

← Summary of the 27 May 2007 City Council of Basauri election results →
Parties and alliances	Popular vote			Seats	
Parties and alliances	Votes	%	±pp	Total	+/−
Socialist Party of the Basque Country–Basque Country Left (PSE–EE (PSOE))	8,062	40.52	+12.01	9	+3
Basque Nationalist Party (EAJ/PNV)^{1}	6,238	31.35	n/a	7	−2
People's Party (PP)	2,738	13.76	−3.37	3	−1
United Left–Greens–Aralar (EB–B–Aralar)^{2}	1,652	8.30	−0.23	2	+1
Basque Solidarity (EA)^{1}	770	3.87	n/a	0	−1
Humanist Party (PH)	107	0.54	−0.06	0	±0
Blank ballots	330	1.66	+0.35		
Total	19,897			21	±0
Valid votes	19,897	91.63	−2.15		
Invalid votes	1,818	8.37	+2.15		
Votes cast / turnout	21,715	58.40	−9.34		
Abstentions	15,466	41.60	+9.34		
Registered voters	37,181				
Sources
Footnotes: ^{1} Within the Basque Nationalist Party–Basque Solidarity alliance in the 2003 election.; ^{2} United Left–Greens–Aralar results are compared to United Left totals in the 2003 election.

=== Bilbao ===
Population: 354,145

← Summary of the 27 May 2007 City Council of Bilbao election results →
Parties and alliances	Popular vote			Seats	
Parties and alliances	Votes	%	±pp	Total	+/−
Basque Nationalist Party (EAJ/PNV)^{1}	64,881	41.23	n/a	13	+2
People's Party (PP)	35,278	22.42	−3.48	7	−1
Socialist Party of the Basque Country–Basque Country Left (PSE–EE (PSOE))	34,687	22.04	+3.33	7	+2
United Left–Greens–Aralar (EB–B–Aralar)^{2}	12,564	7.98	−3.59	2	−1
Basque Solidarity (EA)^{1}	4,246	2.70	n/a	0	−2
The Greens (B/LV)	1,334	0.85	New	0	±0
Party of the Democratic Karma (PKD)	1,036	0.66	+0.01	0	±0
For a Fairer World (PUM+J)	463	0.29	New	0	±0
Humanist Party (PH)	224	0.14	−0.09	0	±0
Carlist Party of the Basque Country–Carlist Party (EKA–PC)	138	0.09	+0.06	0	±0
Blank ballots	2,507	1.59	+0.48		
Total	157,358			29	±0
Valid votes	157,358	92.52	−2.23		
Invalid votes	12,725	7.48	+2.23		
Votes cast / turnout	170,083	57.04	−11.28		
Abstentions	128,074	42.96	+11.28		
Registered voters	298,157				
Sources
Footnotes: ^{1} Within the Basque Nationalist Party–Basque Solidarity alliance in the 2003 election.; ^{2} United Left–Greens–Aralar results are compared to the combined totals of United Left and Aralar in the 2003 election.

=== Donostia-San Sebastián ===
Population: 183,308

← Summary of the 27 May 2007 City Council of Donostia-San Sebastián election results →
Parties and alliances	Popular vote			Seats	
Parties and alliances	Votes	%	±pp	Total	+/−
Socialist Party of the Basque Country–Basque Country Left (PSE–EE (PSOE))	27,786	37.43	+1.83	11	+1
People's Party (PP)	15,862	21.37	−2.39	6	−1
Basque Nationalist Party (EAJ/PNV)^{1}	12,768	17.20	n/a	5	±0
United Left–Greens–Aralar (EB–B–Aralar)^{2}	8,487	11.43	+2.77	3	+2
Basque Solidarity (EA)^{1}	6,181	8.33	n/a	2	−2
We, the Women of the Plaza (Plazandreok)	585	0.79	+0.14	0	±0
Humanist Party (PH)	271	0.37	New	0	±0
Blank ballots	2,301	3.10	+1.60		
Total	74,241			27	±0
Valid votes	74,241	87.07	−2.71		
Invalid votes	11,029	12.93	+2.71		
Votes cast / turnout	85,270	54.86	−11.60		
Abstentions	70,174	45.14	+11.60		
Registered voters	155,444				
Sources
Footnotes: ^{1} Within the Basque Nationalist Party–Basque Solidarity alliance in the 2003 election.; ^{2} United Left–Greens–Aralar results are compared to the combined totals of United Left and Aralar in the 2003 election.

=== Errenteria ===
Population: 37,853

← Summary of the 27 May 2007 City Council of Errenteria election results →
Parties and alliances	Popular vote			Seats	
Parties and alliances	Votes	%	±pp	Total	+/−
Socialist Party of the Basque Country–Basque Country Left (PSE–EE (PSOE))	6,412	37.03	−6.29	8	−2
Basque Nationalist Action (EAE/ANV)	4,296	24.81	New	6	+6
Basque Nationalist Party (EAJ/PNV)^{1}	2,101	12.13	n/a	2	−1
United Left–Greens–Aralar (EB–B–Aralar)^{2}	1,889	10.91	−0.27	2	±0
People's Party (PP)	1,439	8.31	−3.86	2	±0
Basque Solidarity (EA)^{1}	873	5.04	n/a	1	−3
Blank ballots	306	1.77	−0.09		
Total	17,316			21	±0
Valid votes	17,316	99.37	+16.40		
Invalid votes	110	0.63	−16.40		
Votes cast / turnout	17,426	53.45	−9.25		
Abstentions	15,174	46.55	+9.25		
Registered voters	32,600				
Sources
Footnotes: ^{1} Within the Basque Nationalist Party–Basque Solidarity alliance in the 2003 election.; ^{2} United Left–Greens–Aralar results are compared to United Left totals in the 2003 election.

=== Getxo ===
Population: 82,327

← Summary of the 27 May 2007 City Council of Getxo election results →
Parties and alliances	Popular vote			Seats	
Parties and alliances	Votes	%	±pp	Total	+/−
Basque Nationalist Party (EAJ/PNV)^{1}	13,559	35.10	n/a	10	+1
People's Party (PP)	12,793	33.12	+0.28	10	+1
Socialist Party of the Basque Country–Basque Country Left (PSE–EE (PSOE))	6,113	15.82	+2.86	4	+1
United Left–Greens–Aralar (EB–B–Aralar)^{2}	2,500	6.47	−3.38	1	−1
Basque Solidarity (EA)^{1}	1,538	3.98	n/a	0	−2
The Greens (B/LV)	1,286	3.33	New	0	±0
Blank ballots	842	2.18	+0.48		
Total	38,631			25	±0
Valid votes	38,631	91.64	−2.66		
Invalid votes	3,522	8.36	+2.66		
Votes cast / turnout	42,153	62.67	−12.30		
Abstentions	25,110	37.33	+12.30		
Registered voters	67,263				
Sources
Footnotes: ^{1} Within the Basque Nationalist Party–Basque Solidarity alliance in the 2003 election.; ^{2} United Left–Greens–Aralar results are compared to the combined totals of United Left and Aralar in the 2003 election.

=== Irun ===
Population: 60,261

← Summary of the 27 May 2007 City Council of Irun election results →
Parties and alliances	Popular vote			Seats	
Parties and alliances	Votes	%	±pp	Total	+/−
Socialist Party of the Basque Country–Basque Country Left (PSE–EE (PSOE))	10,635	39.62	+5.19	12	+3
People's Party (PP)	4,320	16.09	−2.65	4	−1
Basque Nationalist Party (EAJ/PNV)^{1}	4,113	15.32	n/a	4	−1
Basque Nationalist Action (EAE/ANV)^{2}	2,687	10.01	+2.26	3	+1
United Left–Greens–Aralar (EB–B–Aralar)^{3}	2,088	7.78	+0.34	2	+1
Basque Solidarity (EA)^{1}	1,320	4.92	n/a	0	−3
Citizen Action (AC/HE)	1,009	3.76	New	0	±0
Liberal Centrist Union (UCL)	141	0.53	New	0	±0
Blank ballots	529	1.97	+0.31		
Total	26,842			25	±0
Valid votes	26,842	99.15	+0.02		
Invalid votes	231	0.85	−0.02		
Votes cast / turnout	27,073	53.35	−11.96		
Abstentions	23,677	46.65	+11.96		
Registered voters	50,750				
Sources
Footnotes: ^{1} Within the Basque Nationalist Party–Basque Solidarity alliance in the 2003 election.; ^{2} Basque Nationalist Action results are compared to Irun People totals in the 2003 election.; ^{3} United Left–Greens–Aralar results are compared to United Left totals in the 2003 election.

=== Portugalete ===
Population: 49,118

← Summary of the 27 May 2007 City Council of Portugalete election results →
Parties and alliances	Popular vote			Seats	
Parties and alliances	Votes	%	±pp	Total	+/−
Socialist Party of the Basque Country–Basque Country Left (PSE–EE (PSOE))	8,756	37.67	+5.32	9	+1
Basque Nationalist Party (EAJ/PNV)^{1}	7,464	32.11	n/a	7	−1
People's Party (PP)	3,675	15.81	−3.84	3	−2
United Left–Greens–Aralar (EB–B–Aralar)^{2}	2,317	9.97	−3.07	2	−1
Basque Solidarity (EA)^{1}	576	2.48	n/a	0	−1
Blank ballots	457	1.97	+0.52		
Total	23,245			21	−4
Valid votes	23,245	93.23	−1.71		
Invalid votes	1,687	6.77	+1.71		
Votes cast / turnout	24,932	59.22	−8.64		
Abstentions	17,167	40.78	+8.64		
Registered voters	42,099				
Sources
Footnotes: ^{1} Within the Basque Nationalist Party–Basque Solidarity alliance in the 2003 election.; ^{2} United Left–Greens–Aralar results are compared to the combined totals of United Left and Aralar in the 2003 election.

=== Santurtzi ===
Population: 47,320

← Summary of the 27 May 2007 City Council of Santurtzi election results →
Parties and alliances	Popular vote			Seats	
Parties and alliances	Votes	%	±pp	Total	+/−
Basque Nationalist Party (EAJ/PNV)^{1}	9,898	45.36	n/a	11	+4
Socialist Party of the Basque Country–Basque Country Left (PSE–EE (PSOE))	7,018	32.16	−2.01	7	−1
People's Party (PP)	2,624	12.03	−3.33	2	−1
United Left–Greens (EB–B)^{2}	1,582	7.25	−3.45	1	−1
Basque Solidarity (EA)^{1}	327	1.50	n/a	0	−1
Blank ballots	371	1.70	+0.05		
Total	21,820			21	±0
Valid votes	21,820	91.25	−1.31		
Invalid votes	2,093	8.75	+1.31		
Votes cast / turnout	23,913	59.50	−7.06		
Abstentions	16,280	40.50	+7.06		
Registered voters	40,193				
Sources
Footnotes: ^{1} Within the Basque Nationalist Party–Basque Solidarity alliance in the 2003 election.; ^{2} United Left–Greens results are compared to United Left totals in the 2003 election.

=== Vitoria-Gasteiz ===
Population: 227,568

← Summary of the 27 May 2007 City Council of Vitoria-Gasteiz election results →
Parties and alliances	Popular vote			Seats	
Parties and alliances	Votes	%	±pp	Total	+/−
Socialist Party of the Basque Country–Basque Country Left (PSE–EE (PSOE))	33,855	31.37	+7.43	9	+2
People's Party (PP)	32,101	29.74	−0.73	9	±0
Basque Nationalist Party (EAJ/PNV)^{1}	23,622	21.89	n/a	6	−2
United Left–Greens–Aralar (EB–B–Aralar)^{2}	8,062	7.47	−2.37	2	±0
Basque Solidarity (EA)^{1}	6,046	5.60	n/a	1	±0
Anti-Bullfighting Party Against Mistreatment of Animals (PACMA/ZAAAA)	860	0.80	New	0	±0
For a Fairer World (PUM+J)	716	0.66	New	0	±0
Democratic Innovation (InnDe)	490	0.45	New	0	±0
Humanist Party (PH)	296	0.27	−0.17	0	±0
Blank ballots	1,885	1.75	+0.41		
Total	107,933			27	±0
Valid votes	107,933	93.71	−1.51		
Invalid votes	7,249	6.29	+1.51		
Votes cast / turnout	115,182	62.26	−8.63		
Abstentions	69,807	37.74	+8.63		
Registered voters	184,989				
Sources
Footnotes: ^{1} Within the Basque Nationalist Party–Basque Solidarity alliance in the 2003 election.; ^{2} United Left–Greens–Aralar results are compared to the combined totals of United Left and Aralar in the 2003 election.
