= 2003 Spanish local elections in the Basque Country =

This article presents the results breakdown of the local elections held in the Basque Country on 25 May 2003. The following tables show detailed results in the autonomous community's most populous municipalities, sorted alphabetically.

== City control ==
The following table lists party control in the most populous municipalities, including provincial capitals (highlighted in bold). Gains for a party are highlighted in that party's colour.

Municipality	Population	Previous control	New control
Barakaldo	95,515	Socialist Party of the Basque Country (PSE–EE (PSOE))	Socialist Party of the Basque Country (PSE–EE (PSOE))
Basauri	45,482	Basque Nationalist Party (EAJ/PNV)	Basque Nationalist Party (EAJ/PNV)
**Bilbao**	353,950	Basque Nationalist Party (EAJ/PNV)	Basque Nationalist Party (EAJ/PNV)
**Donostia-San Sebastián**	181,700	Socialist Party of the Basque Country (PSE–EE (PSOE))	Socialist Party of the Basque Country (PSE–EE (PSOE))
Errenteria	38,697	Socialist Party of the Basque Country (PSE–EE (PSOE))	Socialist Party of the Basque Country (PSE–EE (PSOE))
Getxo	84,024	Basque Nationalist Party (EAJ/PNV)	Basque Nationalist Party (EAJ/PNV)
Irun	57,618	Socialist Party of the Basque Country (PSE–EE (PSOE))	Socialist Party of the Basque Country (PSE–EE (PSOE))
Portugalete	51,553	Socialist Party of the Basque Country (PSE–EE (PSOE))	Socialist Party of the Basque Country (PSE–EE (PSOE))
Santurtzi	47,460	Socialist Party of the Basque Country (PSE–EE (PSOE))	Socialist Party of the Basque Country (PSE–EE (PSOE))
**Vitoria-Gasteiz**	221,270	People's Party (PP)	People's Party (PP)

== Municipalities ==
=== Barakaldo ===
Population: 95,515

← Summary of the 25 May 2003 City Council of Barakaldo election results →
Parties and alliances	Popular vote			Seats	
Parties and alliances	Votes	%	±pp	Total	+/−
Socialist Party of the Basque Country–Basque Country Left (PSE–EE (PSOE))	17,448	34.04	+0.69	9	±0
Basque Nationalist Party–Basque Solidarity (PNV–EA)	15,474	30.19	+7.59	8	+2
People's Party (PP)	11,108	21.67	+0.98	5	±0
United Left (EB/IU)	6,401	12.49	+4.37	3	+1
Basque Citizens (EH)	n/a	n/a	−12.79	0	−3
Blank ballots	825	1.61	+0.06		
Total	51,256			25	±0
Valid votes	51,256	94.51	−4.82		
Invalid votes	2,976	5.49	+4.82		
Votes cast / turnout	54,232	64.53	+5.87		
Abstentions	29,816	35.47	−5.87		
Registered voters	84,048				

=== Basauri ===
Population: 45,482

← Summary of the 25 May 2003 City Council of Basauri election results →
Parties and alliances	Popular vote			Seats	
Parties and alliances	Votes	%	±pp	Total	+/−
Basque Nationalist Party–Basque Solidarity (PNV–EA)	11,045	43.92	+9.58	10	+3
Socialist Party of the Basque Country–Basque Country Left (PSE–EE (PSOE))	7,170	28.51	+0.67	6	±0
People's Party (PP)	4,309	17.13	−0.53	4	±0
United Left (EB/IU)	2,145	8.53	+3.31	1	±0
Humanist Party (PH)	152	0.60	+0.10	0	±0
Basque Citizens (EH)	n/a	n/a	−13.09	0	−3
Blank ballots	329	1.31	−0.05		
Total	25,150			21	±0
Valid votes	25,150	93.78	−5.54		
Invalid votes	1,668	6.22	+5.54		
Votes cast / turnout	26,818	67.74	+6.93		
Abstentions	12,770	32.26	−6.93		
Registered voters	39,588				

=== Bilbao ===
Population: 353,950

← Summary of the 25 May 2003 City Council of Bilbao election results →
Parties and alliances	Popular vote			Seats	
Parties and alliances	Votes	%	±pp	Total	+/−
Basque Nationalist Party–Basque Solidarity (PNV–EA)	82,176	41.33	+10.24	13	+4
People's Party (PP)	51,499	25.90	+0.88	8	±0
Socialist Party of the Basque Country–Basque Country Left (PSE–EE (PSOE))	37,206	18.71	+2.21	5	±0
United Left (EB/IU)	20,308	10.21	+4.93	3	+2
Aralar (Aralar)	2,701	1.36	New	0	±0
Party of the Democratic Karma (PKD)	1,285	0.65	New	0	±0
Anti-Bullfighting Party Against Mistreatment of Animals (PACMA/ZAAAA)	484	0.24	New	0	±0
Humanist Party (PH)	456	0.23	+0.10	0	±0
Internationalist Socialist Workers' Party (POSI)	315	0.16	New	0	±0
Spanish Front (Frente)	85	0.04	New	0	±0
Carlist Party (EKA/PC)	66	0.03	New	0	±0
Independent Spanish Phalanx–Phalanx 2000 (FEI–FE 2000)	61	0.03	New	0	±0
Basque Citizens (EH)	n/a	n/a	−12.56	0	−4
Basque Citizen Initiative (ICV/EHE)	n/a	n/a	−7.60	0	−2
Blank ballots	2,207	1.11	−0.19		
Total	198,849			29	±0
Valid votes	198,849	94.75	−4.59		
Invalid votes	11,018	5.25	+4.59		
Votes cast / turnout	209,867	68.32	+7.65		
Abstentions	97,331	31.68	−7.65		
Registered voters	307,198				

=== Donostia-San Sebastián ===
Population: 181,700

← Summary of the 25 May 2003 City Council of Donostia-San Sebastián election results →
Parties and alliances	Popular vote			Seats	
Parties and alliances	Votes	%	±pp	Total	+/−
Socialist Party of the Basque Country–Basque Country Left (PSE–EE (PSOE))	33,349	35.60	+5.55	10	+1
Basque Nationalist Party–Basque Solidarity (PNV–EA)^{1}	27,855	29.73	+6.23	9	+2
People's Party (PP)	22,260	23.76	+2.76	7	+1
United Left (EB/IU)	4,895	5.23	+2.10	1	+1
Aralar (Aralar)	3,214	3.43	New	0	±0
We, the Women of the Plaza (Plazandreok)	611	0.65	±0.00	0	±0
Independent Spanish Phalanx–Phalanx 2000 (FEI–FE 2000)	66	0.07	New	0	±0
Spanish Front (Frente)	26	0.03	New	0	±0
Basque Citizens (EH)	n/a	n/a	−19.62	0	−5
Blank ballots	1,402	1.50	+0.21		
Total	93,678			27	±0
Valid votes	93,678	89.78	−9.70		
Invalid votes	10,665	10.22	+9.70		
Votes cast / turnout	104,343	66.46	+2.90		
Abstentions	52,663	33.54	−2.90		
Registered voters	157,006				
Sources
Footnotes: ^{1} Basque Nationalist Party–Basque Solidarity results are compared to Basque Solidarity–Basque Nationalist Party totals in the 1999 election.

=== Errenteria ===
Population: 38,697

← Summary of the 25 May 2003 City Council of Errenteria election results →
Parties and alliances	Popular vote			Seats	
Parties and alliances	Votes	%	±pp	Total	+/−
Socialist Party of the Basque Country–Basque Country Left (PSE–EE (PSOE))	7,512	43.32	+9.52	10	+2
Basque Nationalist Party–Basque Solidarity (PNV–EA)	5,456	31.47	+13.14	7	+3
People's Party (PP)	2,110	12.17	+0.66	2	±0
United Left (EB/IU)	1,938	11.18	+5.18	2	+1
Basque Citizens (EH)	n/a	n/a	−28.86	0	−6
Blank ballots	323	1.86	+0.35		
Total	17,339			21	±0
Valid votes	17,339	82.97	−16.32		
Invalid votes	3,560	17.03	+16.32		
Votes cast / turnout	20,899	62.70	+2.37		
Abstentions	12,432	37.30	−2.37		
Registered voters	33,331				

=== Getxo ===
Population: 84,024

← Summary of the 25 May 2003 City Council of Getxo election results →
Parties and alliances	Popular vote			Seats	
Parties and alliances	Votes	%	±pp	Total	+/−
Basque Nationalist Party–Basque Solidarity (PNV–EA)	20,923	42.66	+5.40	11	±0
People's Party (PP)	16,106	32.84	−0.28	9	±0
Socialist Party of the Basque Country–Basque Country Left (PSE–EE (PSOE))	6,355	12.96	+3.10	3	+1
United Left (EB/IU)	3,538	7.21	+3.07	2	+2
Aralar (Aralar)	1,294	2.64	New	0	±0
Basque Citizens (EH)	n/a	n/a	−13.10	0	−3
Blank ballots	832	1.70	−0.19		
Total	49,048			25	±0
Valid votes	49,048	94.30	−5.18		
Invalid votes	2,966	5.70	+5.18		
Votes cast / turnout	52,014	74.97	+7.09		
Abstentions	17,367	25.03	−7.09		
Registered voters	69,381				

=== Irun ===
Population: 57,618

← Summary of the 25 May 2003 City Council of Irun election results →
Parties and alliances	Popular vote			Seats	
Parties and alliances	Votes	%	±pp	Total	+/−
Socialist Party of the Basque Country–Basque Country Left (PSE–EE (PSOE))	11,101	34.43	+3.87	9	+1
Basque Nationalist Party–Basque Solidarity (PNV–EA)	9,663	29.97	+0.07	8	±0
People's Party (PP)	6,042	18.74	−2.31	5	−1
Irun People–Meeting Point for Self-Determination (IH)^{1}	2,497	7.75	−4.26	2	−1
United Left (EB/IU)	2,400	7.44	+2.75	1	+1
Blank ballots	535	1.66	−0.13		
Total	32,238			25	±0
Valid votes	32,238	99.13	−0.06		
Invalid votes	284	0.87	+0.06		
Votes cast / turnout	32,522	65.31	+3.89		
Abstentions	17,273	34.69	−3.89		
Registered voters	49,795				
Sources
Footnotes: ^{1} Irun People–Meeting Point for Self-Determination results are compared to Basque Citizens totals in the 1999 election.

=== Portugalete ===
Population: 51,553

← Summary of the 25 May 2003 City Council of Portugalete election results →
Parties and alliances	Popular vote			Seats	
Parties and alliances	Votes	%	±pp	Total	+/−
Basque Nationalist Party–Basque Solidarity (PNV–EA)	9,689	33.54	+5.90	9	+2
Socialist Party of the Basque Country–Basque Country Left (PSE–EE (PSOE))	9,336	32.32	+3.09	8	±0
People's Party (PP)	5,678	19.65	−0.90	5	±0
United Left (EB/IU)	3,386	11.72	+1.97	3	+1
Aralar (Aralar)	381	1.32	New	0	±0
Basque Citizens (EH)	n/a	n/a	−10.98	0	−3
Blank ballots	420	1.45	−0.40		
Total	28,890			25	±0
Valid votes	28,890	94.94	−4.16		
Invalid votes	1,541	5.06	+4.16		
Votes cast / turnout	30,431	67.86	+6.44		
Abstentions	14,412	32.14	−6.44		
Registered voters	44,843				

=== Santurtzi ===
Population: 47,460

← Summary of the 25 May 2003 City Council of Santurtzi election results →
Parties and alliances	Popular vote			Seats	
Parties and alliances	Votes	%	±pp	Total	+/−
Basque Nationalist Party–Basque Solidarity (PNV–EA)	9,640	38.12	+11.43	8	+2
Socialist Party of the Basque Country–Basque Country Left (PSE–EE (PSOE))	8,641	34.17	−0.20	8	±0
People's Party (PP)	3,883	15.36	+0.10	3	±0
United Left (EB/IU)	2,707	10.70	+3.04	2	+1
Basque Citizens (EH)	n/a	n/a	−14.56	0	−3
Blank ballots	417	1.65	+0.19		
Total	25,288			21	±0
Valid votes	25,288	92.56	−6.78		
Invalid votes	2,034	7.44	+6.78		
Votes cast / turnout	27,322	66.56	+6.07		
Abstentions	13,725	33.44	−6.07		
Registered voters	41,047				

=== Vitoria-Gasteiz ===
Population: 221,270

← Summary of the 25 May 2003 City Council of Vitoria-Gasteiz election results →
Parties and alliances	Popular vote			Seats	
Parties and alliances	Votes	%	±pp	Total	+/−
People's Party (PP)	38,222	30.47	−0.33	9	±0
Basque Nationalist Party–Basque Solidarity (PNV–EA)	36,855	29.38	+4.84	9	+2
Socialist Party of the Basque Country–Basque Country Left (PSE–EE (PSOE))	30,033	23.94	+5.32	7	+2
United Left (EB/IU)	10,058	8.02	+2.89	2	+1
Alavese Unity (UA)	5,667	4.52	−2.98	0	−2
Aralar (Aralar)	2,283	1.82	New	0	±0
Humanist Party (PH)	553	0.44	+0.05	0	±0
Independent Spanish Phalanx–Phalanx 2000 (FEI–FE 2000)	54	0.04	New	0	±0
Spanish Front (Frente)	49	0.04	New	0	±0
Basque Citizens (EH)	n/a	n/a	−11.57	0	−3
Blank ballots	1,687	1.34	−0.10		
Total	125,461			27	±0
Valid votes	125,461	95.22	−3.86		
Invalid votes	6,298	4.78	+3.86		
Votes cast / turnout	131,759	70.89	+8.99		
Abstentions	54,094	29.11	−8.99		
Registered voters	185,853				
