= 2003 Spanish local elections in Galicia =

This article presents the results breakdown of the local elections held in Galicia on 25 May 2003. The following tables show detailed results in the autonomous community's most populous municipalities, sorted alphabetically.

== City control ==
The following table lists party control in the most populous municipalities, including provincial capitals (highlighted in bold). Gains for a party are highlighted in that party's colour.

Municipality	Population	Previous control	New control
**A Coruña**	242,458	Socialists' Party of Galicia (PSdeG–PSOE)	Socialists' Party of Galicia (PSdeG–PSOE)
Ferrol	79,520	Galician Nationalist Bloc (BNG)	People's Party (PP)
**Lugo**	89,509	Socialists' Party of Galicia (PSdeG–PSOE)	Socialists' Party of Galicia (PSdeG–PSOE)
**Ourense**	109,011	People's Party (PP)	People's Party (PP)
**Pontevedra**	76,798	Galician Nationalist Bloc (BNG)	Galician Nationalist Bloc (BNG)
Santiago de Compostela	93,273	Socialists' Party of Galicia (PSdeG–PSOE)	Socialists' Party of Galicia (PSdeG–PSOE)
Vigo	288,324	Galician Nationalist Bloc (BNG)	Socialists' Party of Galicia (PSdeG–PSOE) (PP in 2003)

== Municipalities ==
=== A Coruña ===
Population: 242,458

← Summary of the 25 May 2003 City Council of A Coruña election results →
Parties and alliances	Popular vote			Seats	
Parties and alliances	Votes	%	±pp	Total	+/−
Socialists' Party of Galicia (PSdeG–PSOE)	57,150	45.70	−10.64	14	−3
People's Party (PP)	30,083	24.06	−0.63	7	±0
Galician Nationalist Bloc (BNG)	28,382	22.70	+9.68	6	+3
United Left (EU–IU)	3,156	2.52	+1.19	0	±0
Party of Self-employed and Professionals (AUTONOMO)	1,054	0.84	+0.39	0	±0
Humanist Party (PH)	591	0.47	+0.23	0	±0
National Democracy (DN)	172	0.14	New	0	±0
Blank ballots	4,459	3.57	+0.95		
Total	125,047			27	±0
Valid votes	125,047	99.31	+0.07		
Invalid votes	872	0.69	−0.07		
Votes cast / turnout	125,919	57.34	+1.58		
Abstentions	93,668	42.66	−1.58		
Registered voters	219,587				

=== Ferrol ===
Population: 79,520

← Summary of the 25 May 2003 City Council of Ferrol election results →
Parties and alliances	Popular vote			Seats	
Parties and alliances	Votes	%	±pp	Total	+/−
People's Party (PP)	10,231	24.48	−7.89	7	−2
Galician Nationalist Bloc (BNG)	9,458	22.63	−5.31	6	−2
Independents for Ferrol (IF)	9,412	22.52	+11.57	6	+3
Socialists' Party of Galicia (PSdeG–PSOE)	5,433	13.00	−4.73	4	−1
United Left (EU–IU)	3,950	9.45	+4.75	2	+2
Citizen Action of Ferrol (ACF)	2,002	4.79	New	0	±0
Party of Self-employed and Professionals (AUTONOMO)	239	0.57	−0.32	0	±0
Blank ballots	1,075	2.57	+0.22		
Total	41,800			25	±0
Valid votes	41,800	99.36	+0.07		
Invalid votes	271	0.64	−0.07		
Votes cast / turnout	42,071	63.51	+6.32		
Abstentions	24,169	36.49	−6.32		
Registered voters	66,240				

=== Lugo ===
Population: 89,509

← Summary of the 25 May 2003 City Council of Lugo election results →
Parties and alliances	Popular vote			Seats	
Parties and alliances	Votes	%	±pp	Total	+/−
Socialists' Party of Galicia (PSdeG–PSOE)	28,089	51.36	+28.18	13	+6
People's Party (PP)	18,063	33.03	−9.07	9	−3
Galician Nationalist Bloc (BNG)	6,285	11.49	−9.22	3	−3
United Left (EU–IU)	796	1.46	−2.68	0	±0
Democratic and Social Centre (CDS)	375	0.69	New	0	±0
Humanist Party (PH)	123	0.22	+0.07	0	±0
Blank ballots	960	1.76	−0.42		
Total	54,691			25	±0
Valid votes	54,691	99.42	+0.39		
Invalid votes	320	0.58	−0.39		
Votes cast / turnout	55,011	69.63	+8.56		
Abstentions	23,992	30.37	−8.56		
Registered voters	79,003				

=== Ourense ===
Population: 109,011

← Summary of the 25 May 2003 City Council of Ourense election results →
Parties and alliances	Popular vote			Seats	
Parties and alliances	Votes	%	±pp	Total	+/−
People's Party (PP)	28,841	46.48	−1.10	14	±0
Galician Nationalist Bloc (BNG)	15,165	24.44	+2.20	7	±0
Socialists' Party of Galicia (PSdeG–PSOE)	12,187	19.64	−0.22	6	±0
Socialists for Galicia–Socialists for Ourense (SpG–SpO)	2,938	4.74	New	0	±0
United Left (EU–IU)	836	1.35	+0.16	0	±0
Galician Coalition (CG)	313	0.50	−0.91	0	±0
Ourensan Democracy (DO)	284	0.46	New	0	±0
Another Democracy is Possible (ODeP)	131	0.21	New	0	±0
Humanist Party (PH)	125	0.20	+0.08	0	±0
Blank ballots	1,225	1.97	−0.03		
Total	62,045			27	±0
Valid votes	62,045	99.27	+0.56		
Invalid votes	458	0.73	−0.56		
Votes cast / turnout	62,503	61.55	+4.56		
Abstentions	39,044	38.45	−4.56		
Registered voters	101,547				

=== Pontevedra ===
Population: 76,798

← Summary of the 25 May 2003 City Council of Pontevedra election results →
Parties and alliances	Popular vote			Seats	
Parties and alliances	Votes	%	±pp	Total	+/−
Galician Nationalist Bloc (BNG)	17,400	38.93	+1.56	10	±0
People's Party (PP)	15,946	35.68	−3.24	10	±0
Socialists' Party of Galicia (PSdeG–PSOE)	8,004	17.91	+0.04	5	±0
The Greens (OV)	1,060	2.37	New	0	±0
Os Praceres Citizen Initiative (ICP)	666	1.49	New	0	±0
United Left (EU–IU)	392	0.88	−0.25	0	±0
Democratic and Social Centre (CDS)	315	0.70	New	0	±0
Blank ballots	912	2.04	−0.03		
Total	44,695			25	±0
Valid votes	44,695	99.38	+0.09		
Invalid votes	280	0.62	−0.09		
Votes cast / turnout	44,975	63.25	+1.49		
Abstentions	26,131	36.75	−1.49		
Registered voters	71,106				

=== Santiago de Compostela ===
Population: 93,273

← Summary of the 25 May 2003 City Council of Santiago de Compostela election results →
Parties and alliances	Popular vote			Seats	
Parties and alliances	Votes	%	±pp	Total	+/−
Socialists' Party of Galicia (PSdeG–PSOE)	20,481	40.32	+7.08	11	+2
People's Party (PP)	18,489	36.40	−6.46	10	−1
Galician Nationalist Bloc (BNG)	8,507	16.75	−1.25	4	−1
United Left (EU–IU)	590	1.16	+0.66	0	±0
Independent Democratic Centre (CDI)	581	1.14	New	0	±0
Another Democracy is Possible (ODeP)	216	0.43	New	0	±0
Democratic and Social Centre (CDS)	206	0.41	New	0	±0
Blank ballots	1,720	3.39	+1.24		
Total	50,790			25	±0
Valid votes	50,790	99.24	+0.03		
Invalid votes	389	0.76	−0.03		
Votes cast / turnout	51,179	64.82	+5.46		
Abstentions	27,778	35.18	−5.46		
Registered voters	78,957				

=== Vigo ===
Population: 288,324

← Summary of the 25 May 2003 City Council of Vigo election results →
Parties and alliances	Popular vote			Seats	
Parties and alliances	Votes	%	±pp	Total	+/−
People's Party (PP)	52,598	33.11	−3.60	10	−1
Socialists' Party of Galicia (PSdeG–PSOE)	44,497	28.01	+4.55	8	+1
Galician Nationalist Bloc (BNG)	39,387	24.79	−0.04	7	−1
Viguese Progressives–Galician Progressive Democracy (PROVI–DPG)^{1}	10,373	6.53	+0.48	2	+1
Convergence for Vigo (COVI)	3,955	2.49	New	0	±0
United Left (EU–IU)	3,197	2.01	+0.48	0	±0
The Olive Tree (EO)	666	0.42	New	0	±0
Humanist Party (PH)	465	0.29	−0.12	0	±0
Republican Left–Galician Republican Left–PCPG (IR–ERG–PCPG)	272	0.17	New	0	±0
Blank ballots	3,447	2.17	−0.63		
Total	158,857			27	±0
Valid votes	158,857	99.30	+0.09		
Invalid votes	1,113	0.70	−0.09		
Votes cast / turnout	159,970	63.86	+5.43		
Abstentions	90,540	36.14	−5.43		
Registered voters	250,510				
Sources
Footnotes: ^{1} Viguese Progressives–Galician Progressive Democracy results are compared to the combined totals of Viguese Progressives and Galician Democracy in the 1999 election.
