= Opinion polling for the 2023 Spanish local elections (Asturias) =

In the run up to the 2023 Spanish local elections, various organisations carried out opinion polling to gauge voting intention in local entities in Spain. Results of such polls for municipalities in Asturias are displayed in this article. The date range for these opinion polls is from the previous local elections, held on 26 May 2019, to the day the next elections were held, on 28 May 2023.

Polls are listed in reverse chronological order, showing the most recent first and using the dates when the survey fieldwork was done, as opposed to the date of publication. Where the fieldwork dates are unknown, the date of publication is given instead. The highest percentage figure in each polling survey is displayed with its background shaded in the leading party's colour. If a tie ensues, this is applied to the figures with the highest percentages. The "Lead" columns on the right shows the percentage-point difference between the parties with the highest percentages in a given poll.

== Municipalities ==
=== Avilés ===
Polling firm/Commissioner	Fieldwork date	Sample size	Turnout	PSOE	Cambia Avilés	PP	Cs	Vox	FAC	Lead
2023 municipal election	28 May 2023	—N/a	60.8	33.1; 9	13.3; 4	30.6; 9	1.5; 0	12.5; 3	1.1; 0	2.5
GESOP/La Nueva España	6–15 May 2023	400	?	34.6; 9/10	18.0; 4/5	21.1; 6/7	3.5; 0	12.9; 3/4	–	13.5
GAD3/IU	1–7 Mar 2023	400	?	36.0; 10	18.7; 5	32.2; 9/10	2.2; 0	4.8; 0/1	1.2; 0	3.8
2019 municipal election	26 May 2019	—N/a	58.8	36.4; 10	19.9; 5	14.7; 4	13.4; 4	7.5; 2	1.7; 0	16.5

=== Gijón ===
Polling firm/Commissioner	Fieldwork date	Sample size	Turnout	PSOE	CS	FAC	Podemos	PP	Vox	IU/IX	Lead
2023 municipal election	28 May 2023	—N/a	64.1	29.0; 9	1.0; 0	28.7; 8	5.2; 1	16.7; 5	8.0; 2	8.0; 2	0.3
GESOP/La Nueva España	2–6 May 2023	504	?	31.7; 9/10	1.2; 0	30.8; 9/10	5.8; 1	12.8; 3/4	7.6; 2	6.2; 1/2	0.9
GAD3/Vocento	26–27 Apr 2023	?	?	31.6; 9/10	1.5; 0	22.3; 6/7	9.2; 2/3	19.1; 6	6.6; 2	5.0; 0/1	9.3
GAD3/IU	1–7 Mar 2023	601	?	29.4; 9	2.0; 0	25.5; 7	8.6; 2	17.3; 5	8.8; 2	6.7; 2	3.9
PSOE	27 Aug 2022	?	?	32.8; 10	–	12.9; 4	8.5; 2	28.0; 9	6.0; 1	6.0; 1	4.8
EM-Analytics/Electomanía	5 Dec 2021	?	?	28.5; 8	? 0	19.6; 6	? 3	14.2; 4	14.0; 4	? 2	8.9
EM-Analytics/Electomanía	13 May–6 Aug 2021	439	?	32.0; 10	2.9; 0	16.3; 5	9.7; 3	15.3; 4	12.7; 3	7.9; 2	15.7
Asturbarómetro	2–20 Jul 2021	408	?	38.1; 11	2.7; 0	13.1; 3/4	5.9; 1	20.2; 6	13.2; 4	6.0; 1/2	17.9
2019 municipal election	26 May 2019	—N/a	60.6	34.2; 11	13.4; 4	12.4; 3	11.9; 3	11.2; 3	7.0; 2	6.2; 1	20.8

=== Langreo ===
Polling firm/Commissioner	Fieldwork date	Sample size	Turnout	PSOE	UpL	PP	CS	FAC	IU/IX	Podemos	Vox (Spanish political party)	Lead
2023 municipal election	28 May 2023	—N/a	58.4	29.1; 7	–	18.9; 4	1.0; 0	1.1; 0	30.3; 8	4.2; 0	8.8; 2	1.2
GESOP/La Nueva España	2–16 May 2023	300	?	34.1; 8/9	–	13.0; 3	–	2.6; 0	27.5; 6/7	2.6; 0	10.0; 2/3	6.6
2019 municipal election	26 May 2019	—N/a	56.9	36.6; 9	35.1; 8	12.2; 2	9.9; 2	2.7; 0	(Note: Within Unidas por Llangréu.)		–	1.5

=== Llanera ===
Polling firm/Commissioner	Fieldwork date	Sample size	Turnout	PSOE	PP	IU/IX	CS	Podemos	Vox	Lead
2023 municipal election	28 May 2023	—N/a	67.0	42.7; 8	29.6; 6	7.6; 1	–	4.0; 0	12.6; 2	13.1
Asturbarómetro/Vox	Nov 2022	260	?	? 8/7	? 5/6	? 1	? 0/1	? 0/1	? 2/3	?
Asturbarómetro	20–28 May 2021	401	?	39.5; 7	29.1; 5/6	12.2; 2	1.8; 0	2.1; 0	15.3; 2/3	10.4
2019 municipal election	26 May 2019	—N/a	63.3	43.6; 8	24.2; 5	8.7; 1	7.9; 1	7.1; 1	7.0; 1	19.4

=== Mieres ===
Polling firm/Commissioner	Fieldwork date	Sample size	Turnout	IU/IX	PSOE	PP	Podemos	Vox (Spanish political party)	Lead
2023 municipal election	28 May 2023	—N/a	59.1	55.9; 14	14.9; 3	15.6; 3	2.3; 0	5.4; 1	40.3
GESOP/La Nueva España	2–12 May 2023	300	?	57.8; 15	16.6; 4	11.4; 2	3.5; 0	4.7; 0	41.2
2019 municipal election	26 May 2019	—N/a	59.6	58.1; 15	18.1; 4	10.4; 2	4.8; 0	2.5; 0	40.0

=== Oviedo ===
Polling firm/Commissioner	Fieldwork date	Sample size	Turnout	PP	PSOE	CS	Podemos	Vox	IU/IX	FAC	Lead
2023 municipal election	28 May 2023	—N/a	64.0	42.5; 14	24.2; 7	1.5; 0	4.5; 0	10.8; 3	10.1; 3	2.7; 0	18.3
GESOP/La Nueva España	2–17 May 2023	502	?	42.0; 13/14	23.5; 7/8	2.0; 0	5.1; 1	8.1; 2	11.8; 3	2.1; 0	18.5
GAD3/Vocento	26–27 Apr 2023	?	?	44.2; 13	25.4; 8	2.2; 0	5.5; 1	11.9; 3	6.5; 2	–	18.8
GAD3/IU	1–7 Mar 2023	500	?	45.8; 14	28.4; 9	3.0; 0	4.0*; 0	8.8; 2	6.2; 2	1.9; 0	17.8
Sigma Dos/El Mundo	9–15 Dec 2022	300	?	37.8; 11/12	27.4; 9	4.7; 0/1	7.5*; 2	13.6; 4	5.9; 1/2	0.4; 0	10.4
Asturbarómetro	12 Jun 2021	403	?	33.6; 10	28.3; 8	6.3; 1/2	5.8*; 1	15.5; 4/5	8.1; 2	–	5.3
Asturbarómetro	8–28 Nov 2020	408	?	33.2; 10	26.5; 8	10.5; 3	8.1*; 2	14.3; 4	4.7; 0	0.4; 0	6.7
Asturbarómetro	8–20 Jul 2020	404	?	33.1; 10	24.8; 7	13.4; 4	11.4*; 3	7.6; 2	6.4; 1	0.7; 0	8.3
ElectoPanel/Electomanía	1 Apr–15 Jun 2020	?	?	33.8; 10	28.4; 8	10.3; 3	11.3*; 3	12.3; 3	–	–	5.4
2019 municipal election	26 May 2019	—N/a	62.9	31.9; 9	26.4; 8	16.1; 5	11.6 (Note: Results for Somos.); 3	6.9; 2	3.8; 0	1.0; 0	5.5

=== Siero ===
Polling firm/Commissioner	Fieldwork date	Sample size	Turnout	PSOE	PP	IU/IX	CS	Podemos	Vox	FAC	PVF	Lead
2023 municipal election	28 May 2023	—N/a	61.1	43.9; 13	23.6; 7	6.7; 1	0.9; 0	5.4; 1	8.9; 2	2.5; 0	6.2; 1	20.3
GESOP/La Nueva España	2–11 May 2023	300	?	40.5; 12/13	19.9; 5/6	8.2; 2	1.7; 0	7.6; 2	10.1; 2/3	3.5; 0	4.5; 0/1	20.6
2019 municipal election	26 May 2019	—N/a	59.6	39.8; 12	11.5; 3	9.4; 3	8.6; 2	8.2; 2	6.2; 1	5.7; 1	5.3; 1	28.3
