= Opinion polling for the 2019 Spanish local elections (Asturias) =

In the run up to the 2019 Spanish local elections, various organisations carried out opinion polling to gauge voting intention in local entities in Spain. Results of such polls for municipalities in Asturias are displayed in this article. The date range for these opinion polls is from the previous local elections, held on 24 May 2015, to the day the next elections were held, on 26 May 2019.

Polls are listed in reverse chronological order, showing the most recent first and using the dates when the survey fieldwork was done, as opposed to the date of publication. Where the fieldwork dates are unknown, the date of publication is given instead. The highest percentage figure in each polling survey is displayed with its background shaded in the leading party's colour. If a tie ensues, this is applied to the figures with the highest percentages. The "Lead" columns on the right shows the percentage-point difference between the parties with the highest percentages in a given poll.

== Municipalities ==
=== Avilés ===
Polling firm/Commissioner	Fieldwork date	Sample size	Turnout	PSOE	PP	Podemos	IU–IX	Cs	GAeC	FAC	Vox	PACMA	Cambia Avilés	Lead
2019 municipal election	26 May 2019	—N/a	58.8	36.4; 10	14.7; 4	(Note: Within Cambia Avilés.)		13.4; 4	2.9; 0	1.7; 0	7.5; 2	–	19.9; 5	16.5
DYM/La Nueva España	10–15 May 2019	407	?	40.0; 10/11	15.0; 4			15.0; 4	3.0; 0	1.0; 0	6.0; 1	–	18.0; 5/6	22.0
ElectoPanel/Electomanía	16–21 Dec 2018	450	?	25.9; 7	19.3; 5	13.0; 4	8.7; 2	20.3; 6	–	2.7; 0	6.0; 1	0.7; 0	–	5.6
2015 municipal election	24 May 2015	—N/a	61.0	26.7; 8	21.9; 6	16.7 (Note: Results for Somos.); 5	13.2; 3	7.7; 2	5.4; 1	4.9; 0	–	–	–	4.8

=== Gijón ===
Polling firm/Commissioner	Fieldwork date	Sample size	Turnout	FAC	PSOE	Podemos	PP	IU–IX	Cs	Unidas Podemos	Vox	PACMA	Lead
2019 municipal election	26 May 2019	—N/a	60.6	12.4; 3	34.2; 11	11.9; 3	11.2; 3	6.2; 1	13.4; 4	–	7.0; 2	–	20.8
DYM/La Nueva España	10–15 May 2019	501	?	10.0; 3	35.0; 10	13.0; 3/4	7.0; 2	5.0; 1	16.0; 4/5	–	10.0; 3	–	19.0
InvesMark/El Comercio	8–15 May 2019	400	?	17.2; 4/5	28.2; 8/9	17.6; 5	6.5; 1/2	5.7; 1	16.4; 4/5	–	5.3; 1	–	10.6
ElectoPanel/Electomanía	16–21 Dec 2018	450	?	10.9; 3	26.5; 8	17.7; 5	12.3; 4	5.9; 1	16.7; 5	–	6.0; 1	0.7; 0	8.8
Asturbarómetro	2–20 Jan 2018	401	?	16.6; 5	21.2; 6	18.7; 5	18.4; 5	9.0; 2	12.6; 4	–	–	–	2.5
Asturbarómetro	20 Aug–20 Sep 2016	?	?	22.1; 6	23.3; 7	(Note: Within Unidas Podemos.)	19.3; 5/6		4.8; 0/1	26.3; 7/8	–	–	3.0
2015 municipal election	24 May 2015	—N/a	62.5	25.6; 8	24.8; 7	21.1 (Note: Results for Xixón Sí Puede.); 6	10.7; 3	8.1; 2	5.7; 1	–	–	–	0.8

=== Langreo ===
Polling firm/Commissioner	Fieldwork date	Sample size	Turnout	PSOE	IU–IX	Podemos	PP	Cs	UpL	Lead
2019 municipal election	26 May 2019	—N/a	56.9	36.6; 9	(Note: Within Unidas por Llangréu.)		12.2; 2	9.9; 2	35.1; 8	1.5
DYM/La Nueva España	10–15 May 2019	251	?	35.0; 8			11.0; 2	12.0; 2/3	36.0; 8/9	1.0
2015 municipal election	24 May 2015	—N/a	59.7	28.2; 6	24.8; 6	20.7; 5	14.0; 3	5.2; 1	–	3.4

=== Mieres ===
Polling firm/Commissioner	Fieldwork date	Sample size	Turnout	IU–IX	PSOE	PP	Podemos	Cs	Lead
2019 municipal election	26 May 2019	—N/a	59.6	58.1; 15	18.1; 4	10.4; 2	4.7; 0	3.9; 0	40.0
DYM/La Nueva España	10–15 May 2019	254	?	59.0; 13/14	17.0; 4	7.0; 1/2	9.0; 2	4.0; 0/1	42.0
2015 municipal election	24 May 2015	—N/a	59.7	49.1; 12	18.7; 4	13.1; 3	11.8; 2	3.0; 0	30.4

=== Oviedo ===
Polling firm/Commissioner	Fieldwork date	Sample size	Turnout	PP	Somos Oviedo	PSOE	IU–IX	Cs	FAC	Vox	PACMA	Lead
2019 municipal election	26 May 2019	—N/a	62.9	31.9; 9	11.6; 3	26.4; 8	3.8; 0	16.1; 5	1.0; 0	6.9; 2	0.7; 0	5.5
DYM/La Nueva España	10–15 May 2019	501	?	26.0; 7/8	12.0; 3/4	31.0; 8/9	4.0; 0/1	17.0; 5	1.0; 0	9.0; 2	–	5.0
InvesMark/El Comercio	8–15 May 2019	400	?	26.4; 7/8	13.7; 4	23.2; 6/7	5.6; 0/1	16.5; 4/5	6.0; 1	6.3; 2/3	–	3.2
ElectoPanel/Electomanía	16–21 Dec 2018	450	?	25.0; 8	12.7; 4	16.3; 4	5.7; 1	19.8; 6	2.7; 0	13.6; 4	0.5; 0	5.2
La Nueva España	13 Dec 2018	402	?	23.3; 6	17.2; 5	17.4; 5	10.4; 3	14.2; 4	–	13.6; 4	–	5.9
NC Report/AsturiasDiario	22 Mar–10 Apr 2018	850	?	28.0; 9	17.8; 5	18.1; 5	9.7; 3	16.3; 5	3.5; 0	–	–	9.9
IU	28 Jan–10 Feb 2016	?	?	35.3	18.0	17.8	9.2	14.6	–	–	–	17.3
2015 municipal election	24 May 2015	—N/a	60.3	34.4; 11	19.0; 6	18.0; 5	9.2; 3	8.5; 2	3.9; 0	1.4; 0	–	15.4

=== Siero ===
Polling firm/Commissioner	Fieldwork date	Sample size	Turnout	PSOE	FAC	Somos Siero	PP	IU–IX	PVF	Cs	PINSI	Vox	Lead
2019 municipal election	26 May 2019	—N/a	59.6	39.8; 12	5.7; 1	8.2; 2	11.5; 3	9.4; 3	5.3; 1	8.6; 2	4.2; 0	6.2; 1	28.3
DYM/La Nueva España	10–15 May 2019	252	?	38.0; 10/11	5.0; 0/1	7.0; 2	15.0; 4	11.0; 3	? 0/1	10.0; 3	? 0/1	8.0; 2	23.0
2015 municipal election	24 May 2015	—N/a	59.2	24.6; 7	16.0; 5	14.7; 4	12.5; 3	11.4; 3	5.7; 1	5.3; 1	5.3; 1	0.5; 0	8.6
