= 2023 Spanish local elections in Asturias =

This article presents the results breakdown of the local elections held in Asturias on 28 May 2023. The following tables show detailed results in the autonomous community's most populous municipalities, sorted alphabetically.

== City control ==
The following table lists party control in the most populous municipalities, including provincial capitals (shown in bold). Gains for a party are displayed with the cell's background shaded in that party's colour.

Municipality	Population	Previous control	New control
Avilés	75,877	Spanish Socialist Workers' Party (PSOE)	Spanish Socialist Workers' Party (PSOE)
Castrillón	22,235	United Left–Asturian Left (IU–IAS)	People's Party (PP)
Gijón	267,706	Spanish Socialist Workers' Party (PSOE)	Asturias Forum (Foro)
Langreo	38,262	Spanish Socialist Workers' Party (PSOE)	United Left–More Country–Asturian Left (IU–MP–IAS)
Mieres	36,574	United Left–Asturian Left (IU–IAS)	United Left–More Country–Asturian Left (IU–MP–IAS)
**Oviedo**	215,167	People's Party (PP)	People's Party (PP)
San Martín del Rey Aurelio	15,505	Spanish Socialist Workers' Party (PSOE)	Spanish Socialist Workers' Party (PSOE)
Siero	51,792	Spanish Socialist Workers' Party (PSOE)	Spanish Socialist Workers' Party (PSOE)

== Municipalities ==
=== Avilés ===
Population: 75,877

← Summary of the 28 May 2023 City Council of Avilés election results →
Parties and alliances	Popular vote			Seats	
Parties and alliances	Votes	%	±pp	Total	+/−
Spanish Socialist Workers' Party (PSOE)	12,488	33.05	−3.38	9	−1
People's Party (PP)	11,545	30.56	+15.88	9	+5
Change Avilés (Podemos–IU–CxAsturies)	5,018	13.28	−6.59	4	−1
Vox (Vox)	4,713	12.47	+5.01	3	+1
Aviles on the Move (Avilés En Marcha)	810	2.14	New	0	±0
Greens Equo (V–Q)	807	2.14	New	0	±0
Citizens–Party of the Citizenry (CS)	546	1.45	−11.93	0	−4
Asturias Forum (Foro)	427	1.13	−0.57	0	±0
Communist Party of the Workers of Spain (PCTE)	343	0.91	+0.29	0	±0
Unionist Party of the Spanish State (PUEDE)	237	0.63	New	0	±0
Blank ballots	847	2.24	+0.86		
Total	37,781			25	±0
Valid votes	37,781	98.40	−0.81		
Invalid votes	613	1.60	+0.81		
Votes cast / turnout	38,394	60.77	+1.94		
Abstentions	24,781	39.23	−1.94		
Registered voters	63,175				

=== Gijón ===
Population: 267,706

← Summary of the 28 May 2023 City Council of Gijón election results →
Parties and alliances	Popular vote			Seats	
Parties and alliances	Votes	%	±pp	Total	+/−
Spanish Socialist Workers' Party (PSOE)	40,637	28.98	−5.23	9	−2
Asturias Forum (Foro)	40,231	28.69	+16.32	8	+5
People's Party (PP)	23,359	16.66	+5.44	5	+2
Vox (Vox)	11,234	8.01	+1.00	2	±0
Assembly for Gijón United Left–More Country–Asturian Left (IU–MP–IAS)^{1}	11,232	8.01	+1.81	2	+1
We Can Gijón (Podemos)	7,214	5.15	−6.75	1	−2
Citizens–Party of the Citizenry (CS)	1,334	0.95	−12.44	0	−4
Greens Equo (V–Q)	980	0.70	New	0	±0
Let Gijón Speak (QHG)	918	0.65	New	0	±0
Communist Party of the Workers of Spain (PCTE)	379	0.27	+0.06	0	±0
Andecha Astur (Andecha)	357	0.25	+0.03	0	±0
Unite Principality (SMP)	283	0.20	New	0	±0
Blank ballots	2,050	1.46	+0.55		
Total	140,208			27	±0
Valid votes	140,208	98.94	+0.58		
Invalid votes	1,509	1.06	−0.58		
Votes cast / turnout	141,717	64.09	+3.53		
Abstentions	79,404	35.91	−3.53		
Registered voters	221,121				
Sources
Footnotes: ^{1} Assembly for Gijón United Left–More Country–Asturian Left results are compared to United Left–Asturian Left: Gijón for the Left totals in the 2019 election.

=== Langreo ===
Population: 38,262

← Summary of the 28 May 2023 City Council of Langreo election results →
Parties and alliances	Popular vote			Seats	
Parties and alliances	Votes	%	±pp	Total	+/−
Assembly for Langreo United Left–More Country–Asturian Left (IU–MP–IAS)^{1}	5,618	30.31	n/a	8	+4
Spanish Socialist Workers' Party (PSOE)	5,399	29.13	−7.46	7	−2
People's Party (PP)	3,504	18.90	+6.75	4	+2
Vox (Vox)	1,621	8.75	New	2	+2
We Can Llangréu (Podemos)^{1}	786	4.24	n/a	0	−4
Union of Independent Citizens (UCIN)	330	1.78	+0.12	0	±0
Asturias Forum (Foro)	201	1.08	−1.57	0	±0
For Asturias (Por Asturias)	189	1.02	New	0	±0
It is For Langreo (EPL)	184	0.99	New	0	±0
Citizens–Party of the Citizenry (CS)	178	0.96	−8.90	0	−2
Unite Principality (SMP)	114	0.62	New	0	±0
Blank ballots	411	2.22	+0.75		
Total	18,535			21	±0
Valid votes	18,535	97.75	−0.95		
Invalid votes	426	2.25	+0.95		
Votes cast / turnout	18,961	58.37	+1.48		
Abstentions	13.523	41.63	−1.48		
Registered voters	32,484				
Sources
Footnotes: ^{1} Within the United for Langreo alliance in the 2019 election.

=== Mieres ===
Population: 36,574

← Summary of the 28 May 2023 City Council of Mieres election results →
Parties and alliances	Popular vote			Seats	
Parties and alliances	Votes	%	±pp	Total	+/−
Assembly for Mieres United Left–More Country–Asturian Left (IU–MP–IAS)^{1}	10,270	55.93	−2.18	14	−1
People's Party (PP)	2,868	15.62	+5.25	3	+1
Spanish Socialist Workers' Party (PSOE)	2,737	14.91	−3.23	3	−1
Vox (Vox)	999	5.44	+2.95	1	+1
We Can Mieres (Podemos)	430	2.34	−2.38	0	±0
SOS Asturias–Empty Spain (SOS Mieres–EV)	365	1.99	New	0	±0
Asturias Forum (Foro)	237	1.29	+0.37	0	±0
Communist Party of the Workers of Spain (PCTE)	123	0.67	+0.29	0	±0
Blank ballots	333	1.81	+0.79		
Total	18,362			21	±0
Valid votes	18,362	98.37	−0.74		
Invalid votes	305	1.63	+0.74		
Votes cast / turnout	18,667	59.05	+0.53		
Abstentions	12,943	40.95	−0.53		
Registered voters	31,610				
Sources
Footnotes: ^{1} Assembly for Mieres United Left–More Country–Asturian Left results are compared to United Left–Asturian Left: Mieres by the Left totals in the 2019 election.

=== Oviedo ===
Population: 215,167

← Summary of the 28 May 2023 City Council of Oviedo election results →
Parties and alliances	Popular vote			Seats	
Parties and alliances	Votes	%	±pp	Total	+/−
People's Party (PP)	46,805	42.51	+10.64	14	+5
Spanish Socialist Workers' Party (PSOE)	26,636	24.19	−2.25	7	−1
Vox (Vox)	11,915	10.82	+3.90	3	+1
Assembly for Oviedo United Left–More Country–Asturian Left (IU–MP–IAS)^{1}	11,128	10.11	+6.34	3	+3
We Can (Podemos)^{2}	4,901	4.45	−7.16	0	−3
Asturias Forum (Foro)	2,954	2.68	+1.66	0	±0
Citizens–Party of the Citizenry (CS)	1,683	1.53	−14.61	0	−5
Unite Principality (SMP)	793	0.72	New	0	±0
Blank Seats to Leave Empty Seats (EB)	447	0.41	New	0	±0
For a Fairer World (PUM+J)	415	0.38	New	0	±0
Communist Party of the Workers of Spain (PCTE)	305	0.28	+0.13	0	±0
Andecha Astur (Andecha)	258	0.23	+0.05	0	±0
Blank ballots	1,876	1.70	+0.74		
Total	110,116			27	±0
Valid votes	110,116	98.90	−0.53		
Invalid votes	1,228	1.10	+0.53		
Votes cast / turnout	111,344	64.01	+1.12		
Abstentions	62.596	35.99	−1.12		
Registered voters	173,940				
Sources
Footnotes: ^{1} Assembly for Oviedo United Left–More Country–Asturian Left results are compared to United Left–Asturian Left: Oviedo by the Left totals in the 2019 election.; ^{2} We Can results are compared to We Are Oviedo–We Can Asturias totals in the 2019 election.

=== San Martín del Rey Aurelio ===
Population: 15,505

← Summary of the 28 May 2023 City Council of San Martín del Rey Aurelio election results →
Parties and alliances	Popular vote			Seats	
Parties and alliances	Votes	%	±pp	Total	+/−
Spanish Socialist Workers' Party (PSOE)	2,500	30.50	−10.74	6	−2
Assembly for Samartín United Left–More Country–Asturian Left (IU–MP–IAS)^{1}	1,827	22.29	−7.29	5	±0
People's Party (PP)	1,290	15.74	+3.52	3	+1
Samartín Electors' Group (AESamartín)	822	10.03	New	2	+2
Start up San Martín (Arranca San Martín)	645	7.87	New	1	+1
Vox (Vox)	388	4.73	New	0	±0
Citizens–Party of the Citizenry (CS)	322	3.93	−3.73	0	−1
We Can San Martín del Rey Aurelio (Podemos)	246	3.00	−4.60	0	−1
Blank ballots	158	1.93	+0.24		
Total	8,198			17	±0
Valid votes	8,198	97.77	+0.07		
Invalid votes	187	2.23	−0.07		
Votes cast / turnout	8,385	62.21	+1.00		
Abstentions	5,093	37.79	−1.00		
Registered voters	13,478				
Sources
Footnotes: ^{1} Assembly for Samartín United Left–More Country–Asturian Left results are compared to United Left–Asturian Left: San Martín del Rey Aurelio by the Left totals in the 2019 election.

=== Siero ===
Population: 51,792

← Summary of the 28 May 2023 City Council of Siero election results →
Parties and alliances	Popular vote			Seats	
Parties and alliances	Votes	%	±pp	Total	+/−
Spanish Socialist Workers' Party (PSOE)	11,524	43.92	+4.11	13	+1
People's Party (PP)	6,180	23.55	+12.04	7	+4
Vox (Vox)	2,339	8.91	+2.73	2	+1
Assembly for Siero United Left–More Country–Asturian Left (IU–MP–IAS)^{1}	1,749	6.67	−2.70	1	−2
La Fresneda Local Platform (PVF)	1,638	6.24	+0.93	1	±0
We Can (Podemos)^{2}	1,421	5.42	−2.79	1	−1
Asturias Forum (Foro)	649	2.47	−3.27	0	−1
Citizens–Party of the Citizenry (CS)	240	0.91	−7.73	0	−2
Blank ballots	501	1.91	+0.83		
Total	26,241			25	±0
Valid votes	26,241	98.50	−0.69		
Invalid votes	400	1.50	+0.69		
Votes cast / turnout	26,641	61.07	+1.51		
Abstentions	16,985	38.93	−1.51		
Registered voters	43,626				
Sources
Footnotes: ^{1} Assembly for Siero United Left–More Country–Asturian Left results are compared to United Left–Asturian Left: Siero by the Left totals in the 2019 election.; ^{2} We Can results are compared to We Are Siero totals in the 2019 election.

== See also ==
- 2023 Asturian regional election
