= Opinion polling for the 2019 Spanish local elections (Galicia) =

In the run up to the 2019 Spanish local elections, various organisations carried out opinion polling to gauge voting intention in local entities in Spain. Results of such polls for municipalities in Galicia are displayed in this article. The date range for these opinion polls is from the previous local elections, held on 24 May 2015, to the day the next elections were held, on 26 May 2019.

Polls are listed in reverse chronological order, showing the most recent first and using the dates when the survey fieldwork was done, as opposed to the date of publication. Where the fieldwork dates are unknown, the date of publication is given instead. The highest percentage figure in each polling survey is displayed with its background shaded in the leading party's colour. If a tie ensues, this is applied to the figures with the highest percentages. The "Lead" columns on the right show the percentage-point difference between the parties with the highest percentages in a given poll.

== Municipalities ==
=== A Coruña ===
Color key:

Poll conducted after legal ban on opinion polls Exit poll

Polling firm/Commissioner	Fieldwork date	Sample size	Turnout	PP	Marea Atlántica	PSdeG–PSOE	BNG	Cs	AV	Vox	Lead
2019 municipal election	26 May 2019	—N/a	62.8	30.3; 9	20.2; 6	30.0; 9	7.2; 2	5.8; 1	2.3; 0	2.1; 0	0.3
GfK/FORTA	26 May 2019	?	?	25.8; 7/8	24.7; 6/7	29.0; 8/10	9.9; 2/3	5.2; 0/1	–	5.5; 0/1	3.2
Sondaxe/La Voz de Galicia	21–24 May 2019	300	65.3	25.4; 8	19.9; 6	26.3; 8	7.3; 2	8.9; 3	3.3; 0	4.9; 0	0.9
Sondaxe/La Voz de Galicia	16–19 May 2019	300	63.9	28.3; 9	21.5; 6	30.0; 9	6.7; 2	5.4; 1	2.2; 0	2.1; 0	1.7
Sondaxe/La Voz de Galicia	15–18 May 2019	300	63.2	29.0; 9	20.3; 6	26.2; 8	9.2; 2	6.5; 2	2.5; 0	2.9; 0	2.8
Sondaxe/La Voz de Galicia	14–17 May 2019	300	64.8	27.7; 9	18.2; 5	28.4; 9	10.0; 3	5.8; 1	2.7; 0	3.2; 0	0.7
Sondaxe/La Voz de Galicia	13–16 May 2019	300	64.9	26.4; 8	17.2; 5	31.0; 10	10.3; 3	5.8; 1	2.1; 0	4.2; 0	4.6
Sondaxe/La Voz de Galicia	12–15 May 2019	300	66.5	25.6; 8	17.1; 5	30.0; 9	9.7; 3	7.8; 2	1.7; 0	4.0; 0	4.4
DYM/La Opinión A Coruña	10–15 May 2019	604	60	28.0; 8	21.0; 6	30.0; 9	7.0; 2	8.0; 2	–	3.0; 0	2.0
Sondaxe/La Voz de Galicia	11–14 May 2019	300	67.8	24.1; 7	19.4; 6	32.2; 10	7.6; 2	7.1; 2	3.1; 0	3.3; 0	8.1
Sondaxe/La Voz de Galicia	10–13 May 2019	300	65.2	23.3; 7	21.2; 6	30.7; 10	6.7; 2	9.0; 2	3.2; 0	2.1; 0	7.4
Sondaxe/La Voz de Galicia	9–12 May 2019	300	69.5	24.1; 7	21.5; 7	30.1; 8	6.0; 2	9.7; 3	3.9; 0	1.8; 0	6.0
Sondaxe/La Voz de Galicia	8–11 May 2019	300	70.8	24.1; 7	23.1; 7	28.9; 8	6.9; 2	9.9; 3	–	1.7; 0	4.8
Sondaxe/La Voz de Galicia	7–10 May 2019	300	74.0	24.6; 7	23.6; 7	28.5; 8	7.0; 2	9.6; 3	–	1.6; 0	3.9
40 dB/El País	30 Apr–2 May 2019	800	?	25.0; 7	22.0; 6/7	31.3; 9/10	7.0; 2	8.3; 2	–	–	6.3
Sondaxe/La Voz de Galicia	28 Jan–3 Feb 2019	400	?	30.8; 9	24.5; 7	22.2; 7	8.1; 2	6.4; 2	–	1.6; 0	6.3
Edesga/Marea	15–25 Jan 2019	800	?	23.6; 7/8	23.8; 8/9	22.4; 6/7	8.5; 1/2	8.7; 1/3	–	–	0.2
Sondaxe/La Voz de Galicia	2–14 May 2018	400	?	29.4; 9	31.9; 9	19.8; 6	5.5; 1	9.2; 2	–	–	2.5
Sondaxe/La Voz de Galicia	5–11 May 2017	?	61.6	34.8; 11	36.4; 11	12.5; 3	5.5; 1	5.4; 1	–	–	1.6
Sondaxe/La Voz de Galicia	15 Nov–21 Dec 2016	?	?	32.0; 10	36.0; 11	14.4; 4	7.9; 2	2.4; 0	–	–	4.0
NC Report/La Razón	26 Jul–8 Aug 2015	600	52.5	31.6; 10	29.3; 9	19.9; 6	6.1; 1	5.5; 1	–	–	2.3
2015 municipal election	24 May 2015	—N/a	60.1	30.9; 10	30.9; 10	18.3; 6	5.7; 1	4.9; 0	1.5; 0	–	0.0

=== A Estrada ===
Polling firm/Commissioner	Fieldwork date	Sample size	Turnout	PP	PSdeG–PSOE	Móvete	BNG	Lead
2019 municipal election	26 May 2019	—N/a	72.9	52.4; 12	27.3; 6	12.0; 2	6.6; 1	25.1
DYM/Prensa Ibérica	19 May 2019	?	?	51.0; 11/12	24.0; 5/6	7.0; 1	13.0; 2/3	27.0
2015 municipal election	24 May 2015	—N/a	74.2	45.2; 11	36.4; 8	7.2; 1	6.5; 1	8.8

=== Allariz ===
Polling firm/Commissioner	Fieldwork date	Sample size	Turnout	BNG	PP	PSdeG–PSOE	Lead
2019 municipal election	26 May 2019	—N/a	70.1	62.1; 9	22.8; 3	13.7; 1	39.3
Infortéctica/La Región	15 May 2018	?	?	? 9/10	? 2/3	? 1	?
2015 municipal election	24 May 2015	—N/a	67.0	65.5; 9	23.1; 3	8.7; 1	42.5

=== Carballo ===
Polling firm/Commissioner	Fieldwork date	Sample size	Turnout	BNG	PP	TeGa	PSdeG–PSOE	Lead
2019 municipal election	26 May 2019	—N/a	61.5	51.6; 12	21.5; 4	9.6; 2	14.9; 3	30.1
Sondaxe/La Voz de Galicia	10–16 May 2019	300	64.4	47.0; 11	16.9; 4	15.5; 3	12.5; 3	30.1
Sondaxe/La Voz de Galicia	28 Jan–3 Feb 2019	300	70.2	48.2; 11	20.5; 5	9.6; 2	12.4; 3	27.7
2015 municipal election	24 May 2015	—N/a	62.4	47.0; 11	23.4; 5	14.2; 3	10.5; 2	23.6

=== Celanova ===
Polling firm/Commissioner	Fieldwork date	Sample size	Turnout	PP	BNG	PSdeG–PSOE	CD	Lead
2019 municipal election	26 May 2019	—N/a	75.3	42.3; 6	11.0; 1	16.5; 2	29.6; 4	12.7
Inforténica/La Región	16 May 2019	?	?	64.3; 7/8	14.3; 2/3	13.3; 2	8.2; 0/2	50.0
2015 municipal election	24 May 2015	—N/a	73.5	57.1; 8	23.3; 3	17.5; 2	–	33.8

=== Ferrol ===
Color key:

Poll conducted after legal ban on opinion polls Exit poll

Polling firm/Commissioner	Fieldwork date	Sample size	Turnout	PP	FeC	PSdeG–PSOE	BNG	Cs	Vox	MF	Lead
2019 municipal election	26 May 2019	—N/a	61.1	41.4; 12	10.7; 3	29.5; 8	7.4; 2	3.7; 0	1.5; 0	2.0; 0	11.9
GfK/FORTA	26 May 2019	?	?	35.9; 10/12	11.7; 3/4	30.9; 8/10	7.6; 1/2	4.0; 0/1	–	–	5.0
Sondaxe/La Voz de Galicia	21–24 May 2019	300	64.7	36.6; 11	9.0; 2	25.2; 8	9.1; 2	8.9; 2	–	3.2; 0	11.4
Sondaxe/La Voz de Galicia	16–19 May 2019	300	58.2	35.8; 10	10.8; 3	27.5; 8	8.9; 2	5.4; 1	–	5.4; 1	8.3
Sondaxe/La Voz de Galicia	15–18 May 2019	300	61.8	39.0; 12	10.9; 3	25.6; 7	9.6; 2	3.6; 0	–	5.7; 1	13.4
Sondaxe/La Voz de Galicia	14–17 May 2019	300	60.7	43.0; 13	12.2; 3	23.4; 7	9.2; 2	3.7; 0	–	4.2; 0	19.6
Sondaxe/La Voz de Galicia	13–16 May 2019	300	62.3	39.9; 11	12.5; 3	27.1; 8	7.8; 2	3.3; 0	–	5.2; 1	12.8
Sondaxe/La Voz de Galicia	12–15 May 2019	300	65.4	38.7; 11	13.8; 4	27.1; 8	6.2; 1	4.0; 0	–	5.3; 1	11.6
Sondaxe/La Voz de Galicia	11–14 May 2019	300	68.3	40.2; 12	13.0; 3	29.0; 8	5.8; 1	5.3; 1	–	3.3; 0	11.2
Sondaxe/La Voz de Galicia	10–13 May 2019	300	71.3	37.9; 11	12.5; 3	27.6; 8	5.6; 1	6.4; 1	–	5.5; 1	10.3
Sondaxe/La Voz de Galicia	9–12 May 2019	300	70.1	37.1; 11	9.7; 2	29.0; 8	6.8; 1	7.9; 2	–	6.4; 1	8.1
Sondaxe/La Voz de Galicia	8–11 May 2019	300	67.8	34.7; 10	9.4; 2	29.5; 8	9.8; 2	5.9; 1	–	7.2; 2	5.2
Sondaxe/La Voz de Galicia	7–10 May 2019	300	67.5	30.9; 9	11.7; 3	28.6; 8	8.5; 2	6.9; 1	–	9.8; 2	2.3
Sondaxe/La Voz de Galicia	28 Jan–3 Feb 2019	400	54.3	42.6; 12	16.5; 5	18.4; 5	8.2; 2	5.4; 1	2.2; 0	–	24.2
Sondaxe/La Voz de Galicia	2–14 May 2018	400	?	36.7; 11	21.4; 6	16.5; 4	7.5; 2	8.0; 2	–	–	15.3
Sondaxe/La Voz de Galicia	5–11 May 2017	?	51.4	39.8; 11	28.5; 8	8.9; 2	10.4; 3	6.4; 1	–	–	11.3
Sondaxe/La Voz de Galicia	15 Nov–21 Dec 2016	?	55.5	40.2; 11	25.5; 7	? 4	? 2	? 1	–	–	14.7
2015 municipal election	24 May 2015	—N/a	56.1	36.1; 11	22.0; 6	18.3; 5	7.5; 2	5.7; 1	0.9; 0	–	14.1

=== Lalín ===
Polling firm/Commissioner	Fieldwork date	Sample size	Turnout	PP	CxG	PSdeG–PSOE	APAC	BNG	Cs	Lead
2019 municipal election	26 May 2019	—N/a	78.5	43.1; 11	20.7; 5	18.7; 4	3.6; 0	7.1; 1	2.0; 0	22.4
DYM/Prensa Ibérica	19 May 2019	?	?	43.0; 10/11	9.0; 2	30.0; 6/7	6.0; 1	4.0; 0/1	3.0; 0/1	13.0
ECO360	14–28 Sep 2015	320	?	29.9; 6/7	38.9; 9/10	13.6; 3	7.5; 1	5.6; 1	–	9.0
2015 municipal election	24 May 2015	—N/a	73.5	44.7; 10	25.3; 6	14.5; 3	6.5; 1	5.3; 1	–	19.4

=== Lugo ===
Color key:

Poll conducted after legal ban on opinion polls Exit poll

Polling firm/Commissioner	Fieldwork date	Sample size	Turnout	PP	PSdeG–PSOE	LN	BNG	Cs	EU	Vox	Podemos (Spanish political party)	Lead
2019 municipal election	26 May 2019	—N/a	61.5	32.4; 10	26.5; 8	2.8; 0	16.4; 5	8.3; 2	2.7; 0	2.1; 0	4.0; 0	5.9
GfK/FORTA	26 May 2019	?	?	25.8; 7/8	28.8; 8/10	–	16.8; 4/5	8.2; 1/2	3.2; 0/1	–	5.5; 0/1	3.0
Sondaxe/La Voz de Galicia	21–24 May 2019	300	61.7	31.5; 10	28.1; 8	3.8; 0	18.0; 5	9.0; 2	4.7; 0	0.6; 0	2.3; 2	2.4
Sondaxe/La Voz de Galicia	16–19 May 2019	300	60.0	30.2; 9	28.9; 8	2.5; 0	13.5; 4	10.0; 2	1.6; 0	1.8; 0	8.0; 2	1.3
Sondaxe/La Voz de Galicia	15–18 May 2019	300	57.8	28.9; 8	30.4; 8	0.8; 0	14.0; 4	11.0; 3	2.5; 0	0.7; 0	8.3; 2	1.5
Sondaxe/La Voz de Galicia	14–17 May 2019	300	58.9	30.4; 9	29.9; 8	1.6; 0	15.6; 4	7.8; 2	2.8; 0	1.5; 0	7.5; 2	0.5
Sondaxe/La Voz de Galicia	13–16 May 2019	300	60.9	29.7; 8	30.2; 9	1.4; 0	14.2; 4	7.5; 2	2.4; 0	1.3; 0	9.4; 2	0.5
Sondaxe/La Voz de Galicia	12–15 May 2019	300	62.7	28.0; 8	32.4; 9	2.0; 0	13.7; 4	8.5; 2	2.5; 0	1.4; 0	8.3; 2	4.4
Sondaxe/La Voz de Galicia	11–14 May 2019	300	63.3	26.5; 8	30.5; 9	3.4; 0	15.8; 4	9.1; 2	2.8; 0	0.6; 0	6.6; 2	4.0
Sondaxe/La Voz de Galicia	10–13 May 2019	300	64.0	22.9; 7	32.1; 9	4.8; 0	16.8; 5	10.0; 3	2.6; 0	0.6; 0	5.8; 1	9.2
Sondaxe/La Voz de Galicia	9–12 May 2019	300	66.6	24.9; 7	31.5; 9	5.5; 1	17.4; 5	9.7; 2	–	0.6; 0	5.5; 1	6.6
Sondaxe/La Voz de Galicia	8–11 May 2019	300	64.7	25.6; 7	32.6; 10	7.1; 2	15.9; 4	9.3; 2	–	1.3; 0	4.5; 0	7.0
Sondaxe/La Voz de Galicia	7–10 May 2019	300	64.7	28.4; 8	32.6; 9	6.7; 2	16.0; 4	6.1; 1	–	0.6; 0	5.9; 1	4.2
Sondaxe/La Voz de Galicia	28 Jan–3 Feb 2019	400	59.1	29.2; 8	31.2; 9	8.3; 2	10.5; 3	9.7; 2	2.8; 0	5.2; 1	–	2.0
Sondaxe/La Voz de Galicia	2–14 May 2018	400	?	26.3; 8	23.0; 7	9.8; 2	8.7; 2	15.2; 4	9.6; 2	–	–	3.3
Sondaxe/La Voz de Galicia	5–11 May 2017	?	55.9	30.7; 8	30.8; 9	12.0; 3	8.3; 2	5.0; 1	7.6; 2	–	–	0.1
2015 municipal election	24 May 2015	—N/a	60.9	32.0; 9	29.5; 8	11.4; 3	8.7; 2	7.4; 2	5.0; 1	–	–	2.5

=== Moaña ===
Polling firm/Commissioner	Fieldwork date	Sample size	Turnout	PP	BNG	PSdeG–PSOE	XM	Lead
2019 municipal election	26 May 2019	—N/a	65.3	32.1; 6	40.1; 7	16.3; 3	10.2; 1	8.0
DYM/Prensa Ibérica	19 May 2019	?	?	26.0; 5	45.0; 8	12.0; 2/3	11.0; 1/2	19.0
2015 municipal election	24 May 2015	—N/a	65.0	39.6; 7	32.6; 6	19.4; 3	6.5; 1	7.0

=== Monforte de Lemos ===
Polling firm/Commissioner	Fieldwork date	Sample size	Turnout	PSdeG–PSOE	BNG	PP	esperta	Cs	Lead
2019 municipal election	26 May 2019	—N/a	64.2	55.6; 11	8.5; 1	22.1; 4	9.3; 1	2.9; 0	33.5
Infortécnica/El Progreso	17 May 2019	?	?	? 10	? 1/2	? 4	? 0/1	? 0/1	?
2015 municipal election	24 May 2015	—N/a	65.9	32.6; 6	28.3; 5	28.1; 5	7.3; 1	–	4.3

=== Narón ===
Polling firm/Commissioner	Fieldwork date	Sample size	Turnout	TeGa	PP	PSdeG–PSOE	BNG	NpD	ENE	Lead
2019 municipal election	26 May 2019	—N/a	53.8	41.2; 10	25.3; 6	12.5; 3	9.1; 2	4.3; 0	3.1; 0	15.9
Sondaxe/La Voz de Galicia	9–15 May 2019	300	54.8	36.5; 9	22.0; 5	11.1; 3	9.5; 2	6.0; 2	–	14.5
2015 municipal election	24 May 2015	—N/a	52.3	38.5; 10	21.9; 5	8.9; 2	8.1; 2	6.1 (Note: Results for EU.); 1	5.3; 1	16.6

=== O Barco de Valdeorras ===
Polling firm/Commissioner	Fieldwork date	Sample size	Turnout	PSdeG–PSOE	PP	RC	BNG	Lead
2019 municipal election	26 May 2019	—N/a	59.1	53.7; 10	27.6; 5	9.6; 1	7.4; 1	26.1
Inforténica/La Región	13 May 2019	192	?	50.8; 7/9	41.3; 7/9	4.8; 0/1	3.2; 0/1	9.5
2015 municipal election	24 May 2015	—N/a	59.7	53.1; 10	32.0; 6	8.7; 1	4.8; 0	21.1

=== Ourense ===
Color key:

Poll conducted after legal ban on opinion polls Exit poll

Polling firm/Commissioner	Fieldwork date	Sample size	Turnout	PP	DO	PSdeG–PSOE	OUeC	BNG	Cs	Vox	Unidas Podemos	EC	Lead
2019 municipal election	26 May 2019	—N/a	64.8	22.5; 7	21.5; 7	26.4; 9	3.8; 0	6.3; 2	8.7; 2	1.3; 0	2.6; 0	1.5; 0	3.9
GfK/FORTA	26 May 2019	?	?	20.8; 6/7	20.8; 6/7	27.1; 8/10	? 1/2	? 2/3	7.0; 1/2	–	–	–	6.3
Sondaxe/La Voz de Galicia	21–24 May 2019	300	65.1	23.1; 7	18.0; 5	28.9; 9	1.3; 0	7.3; 2	5.4; 1	–	9.7; 3	0.7; 0	5.8
Infortécnica/La Región	19 May 2019	?	?	31.7; 9	17.1; 5	24.4; 7	4.1; 1	6.5; 2	8.1; 2	2.8; 0	5.3; 1	–	7.3
Sondaxe/La Voz de Galicia	16–19 May 2019	300	60.9	24.3; 9	18.4; 6	27.4; 10	4.3; 0	3.8; 0	5.3; 1	–	4.0; 0	5.0; 1	3.1
Sondaxe/La Voz de Galicia	15–18 May 2019	300	61.0	25.3; 8	14.7; 5	29.7; 10	3.6; 0	4.3; 0	5.8; 2	–	2.4; 0	6.2; 2	4.4
Sondaxe/La Voz de Galicia	14–17 May 2019	300	64.5	24.7; 8	15.8; 5	30.5; 9	2.4; 0	5.1; 1	6.4; 2	0.6; 0	2.5; 0	6.7; 2	5.8
Sondaxe/La Voz de Galicia	13–16 May 2019	300	67.7	21.5; 7	18.6; 6	29.1; 9	3.0; 0	6.1; 2	10.6; 3	0.6; 0	4.2; 0	–	7.6
Sondaxe/La Voz de Galicia	12–15 May 2019	300	68.3	21.1; 6	22.9; 7	26.2; 8	1.0; 0	8.3; 2	9.7; 3	0.6; 0	5.5; 1	–	3.3
Sondaxe/La Voz de Galicia	11–14 May 2019	300	68.7	19.6; 6	24.7; 8	27.7; 8	1.0; 0	8.5; 2	8.3; 2	0.6; 0	6.1; 1	–	3.0
Sondaxe/La Voz de Galicia	10–13 May 2019	300	69.1	19.6; 6	24.0; 7	27.0; 8	1.7; 0	7.2; 2	9.3; 2	0.5; 0	7.2; 2	–	3.0
Infortécnica/La Región	12 May 2019	400	?	33.6; 9	18.2; 5	20.9; 6	4.5; 1	6.4; 2	7.3; 2	3.6; 1	5.5; 1	–	12.7
Sondaxe/La Voz de Galicia	9–12 May 2019	300	73.8	18.6; 6	20.9; 6	27.5; 8	3.1; 0	7.4; 2	11.0; 3	1.0; 0	7.0; 2	–	6.6
Sondaxe/La Voz de Galicia	8–11 May 2019	300	75.2	18.2; 6	20.8; 7	28.3; 9	4.9; 0	4.9; 0	10.9; 3	0.6; 0	5.7; 2	–	7.5
Sondaxe/La Voz de Galicia	7–10 May 2019	300	75.8	19.1; 6	23.8; 7	25.7; 8	3.7; 0	5.4; 1	9.9; 3	0.6; 0	6.5; 2	–	1.9
Sondaxe/La Voz de Galicia	28 Jan–3 Feb 2019	400	67.4	29.0; 9	21.6; 6	22.9; 7	10.4; 3	–	7.0; 2	–	–	–	6.1
Sondaxe/La Voz de Galicia	2–14 May 2018	400	?	31.0; 10	24.1; 7	19.3; 6	11.7; 3	3.9; 0	5.9; 1	–	–	–	6.9
Infortécnica/La Región	11 Mar 2018	600	?	? 9/11	? 6/7	? 6/7	? 1/2	? 0/2	? 0/2	–	–	–	?
Infortécnica/La Región	25 Jun 2017	?	?	42.2; 11	18.5; 5	20.6; 6	10.0; 3	5.0; 2	–	–	–	–	21.6
Sondaxe/La Voz de Galicia	5–11 May 2017	?	60.8	36.3; 11	21.0; 6	16.7; 5	13.1; 4	5.3; 1	–	–	–	–	15.3
2015 municipal election	24 May 2015	—N/a	61.3	30.9; 10	25.5; 8	19.1; 6	10.4; 3	4.6; 0	–	–	–	–	5.4

=== Pontevedra ===
Color key:

Poll conducted after legal ban on opinion polls Exit poll

Polling firm/Commissioner	Fieldwork date	Sample size	Turnout	BNG	PP	PSdeG–PSOE	MaPo	Cs	Vox	Unidas Podemos	Lead
2019 municipal election	26 May 2019	—N/a	62.5	39.8; 11	30.0; 9	14.0; 4	3.6; 0	5.2; 1	2.5; 0	3.0; 0	9.8
GfK/FORTA	26 May 2019	?	?	47.6; 13/15	22.8; 6/7	12.8; 3/4	4.1; 0/1	5.1; 0/1	–	4.2; 0/1	24.8
Sondaxe/La Voz de Galicia	21–24 May 2019	300	62.2	40.2; 12	23.4; 6	13.6; 4	6.2; 1	8.1; 2	2.4; 0	–	16.8
Sondaxe/La Voz de Galicia	16–19 May 2019	300	60.7	46.2; 13	23.8; 7	13.2; 4	6.3; 1	4.8; 0	3.0; 0	–	22.4
Sondaxe/La Voz de Galicia	15–18 May 2019	300	62.6	46.3; 13	25.4; 7	13.1; 4	6.3; 1	4.2; 0	2.3; 0	–	20.9
Sondaxe/La Voz de Galicia	14–17 May 2019	300	58.0	45.4; 13	27.2; 7	14.1; 4	5.4; 1	4.0; 0	1.5; 0	–	18.2
Sondaxe/La Voz de Galicia	13–16 May 2019	300	65.6	42.6; 12	23.4; 7	15.2; 4	6.4; 1	6.4; 1	3.6; 0	–	19.2
Sondaxe/La Voz de Galicia	12–15 May 2019	300	66.7	43.3; 12	23.5; 6	14.4; 4	7.0; 2	6.2; 1	2.5; 0	–	19.8
DYM/Faro de Vigo	10–15 May 2019	403	?	46.0; 12/13	24.0; 6/7	14.0; 4	4.0; 0/1	6.0; 1	3.0; 0	–	22.0
Sondaxe/La Voz de Galicia	11–14 May 2019	300	66.9	44.7; 12	22.1; 6	11.7; 3	9.3; 2	7.9; 2	2.5; 0	–	22.6
Sondaxe/La Voz de Galicia	10–13 May 2019	300	71.6	42.0; 11	23.0; 6	14.4; 4	8.8; 2	7.8; 2	2.1; 0	–	19.0
Sondaxe/La Voz de Galicia	9–12 May 2019	300	67.2	43.4; 12	23.0; 6	16.4; 4	7.5; 2	6.9; 1	0.5; 0	–	20.4
Sondaxe/La Voz de Galicia	8–11 May 2019	300	65.8	45.7; 12	22.0; 6	14.2; 4	8.0; 2	6.9; 1	1.2; 0	–	23.7
Sondaxe/La Voz de Galicia	7–10 May 2019	300	65.3	46.7; 13	23.0; 6	14.1; 4	5.5; 1	6.9; 1	0.7; 0	–	23.7
Sondaxe/La Voz de Galicia	28 Jan–3 Feb 2019	400	69.4	44.6; 13	16.0; 5	12.4; 3	8.8; 2	6.8; 2	3.9; 0	–	28.6
Sondaxe/La Voz de Galicia	2–14 May 2018	400	?	41.3; 12	24.0; 6	12.5; 3	7.3; 2	7.6; 2	–	–	17.3
Sondaxe/La Voz de Galicia	5–11 May 2017	?	68.3	41.7; 12	27.6; 7	11.2; 3	10.2; 2	6.3; 1	–	–	14.1
2015 municipal election	24 May 2015	—N/a	60.3	43.1; 12	27.1; 7	10.8; 3	8.1; 2	5.7; 1	–	–	16.0

=== Ribadavia ===
Polling firm/Commissioner	Fieldwork date	Sample size	Turnout	PSdeG–PSOE	PP	BNG	REC	CxG	Lead
2019 municipal election	26 May 2019	—N/a	79.3	32.3; 4	36.8; 5	8.2; 1	21.8; 3	–	4.5
Infortécnica/La Región	17 May 2019	?	?	31.9; 4	34.0; 5	6.4; 1	27.7; 3	–	3.1
2015 municipal election	24 May 2015	—N/a	77.3	34.1; 5	33.4; 5	12.1; 1	11.4; 1	7.9; 1	0.7

=== Ribeira ===
Polling firm/Commissioner	Fieldwork date	Sample size	Turnout	PP	BNG	PSdeG–PSOE	Cs	IPR	Vox	PBBI	Lead
2019 municipal election	26 May 2019	—N/a	62.9	36.0; 9	10.1; 2	11.6; 2	2.1; 0	4.5; 0	–	27.6; 7	8.4
Sondaxe/La Voz de Galicia	9–15 May 2019	300	63.1	21.4; 5	14.0; 3	18.8; 5	–	8.3; 2	–	25.1; 6	3.7
Sondaxe/La Voz de Galicia	28 Jan–3 Feb 2019	300	54.4	31.8; 8	17.9; 4	14.0; 3	8.6; 2	11.0; 3	5.0; 1	–	13.9
2015 municipal election	24 May 2015	—N/a	59.1	41.0; 9	17.4; 4	17.1; 3	12.8; 3	9.9; 2	–	–	23.6

=== Santiago de Compostela ===
Color key:

Poll conducted after legal ban on opinion polls Exit poll

Polling firm/Commissioner	Fieldwork date	Sample size	Turnout	Compostela Aberta	PP	PSdeG–PSOE	BNG	Cs	Vox	Lead
2019 municipal election	26 May 2019	—N/a	66.7	20.4; 5	29.2; 8	34.7; 10	9.3; 2	3.2; 0	1.1; 0	5.5
GfK/FORTA	26 May 2019	?	?	26.1; 7/8	21.9; 5/6	32.4; 8/10	12.9; 3/4	3.4; 0/1	–	6.3
Sondaxe/La Voz de Galicia	21–24 May 2019	300	66.1	22.2; 6	24.4; 7	33.7; 9	10.3; 3	3.9; 0	1.2; 0	9.3
Sondaxe/La Voz de Galicia	16–19 May 2019	300	69.3	22.9; 6	24.3; 7	33.3; 9	7.7; 2	5.7; 1	1.9; 0	9.0
Sondaxe/La Voz de Galicia	15–18 May 2019	300	70.0	23.8; 7	24.2; 7	30.2; 8	9.3; 2	5.7; 1	1.2; 0	6.0
Sondaxe/La Voz de Galicia	14–17 May 2019	300	67.6	23.9; 7	25.5; 7	30.5; 8	8.1; 2	5.4; 1	1.2; 0	5.0
Sondaxe/La Voz de Galicia	13–16 May 2019	300	66.7	22.9; 6	26.8; 8	32.2; 9	9.3; 2	3.2; 0	1.9; 0	5.4
Sondaxe/La Voz de Galicia	12–15 May 2019	300	70.0	21.4; 6	25.7; 7	33.0; 9	10.1; 3	3.6; 0	2.8; 0	7.3
Sondaxe/La Voz de Galicia	11–14 May 2019	300	70.8	20.6; 6	23.6; 7	36.9; 10	8.4; 2	3.3; 0	3.0; 0	13.3
Sondaxe/La Voz de Galicia	10–13 May 2019	300	74.1	21.3; 6	23.1; 6	36.8; 10	8.5; 2	5.8; 1	2.8; 0	13.7
Sondaxe/La Voz de Galicia	9–12 May 2019	300	73.0	19.6; 5	21.1; 6	38.1; 10	8.3; 2	8.4; 2	2.9; 0	17.0
Sondaxe/La Voz de Galicia	8–11 May 2019	300	72.5	19.7; 5	21.0; 6	37.7; 10	8.9; 2	8.3; 2	1.7; 0	16.7
Sondaxe/La Voz de Galicia	7–10 May 2019	300	70.0	20.5; 5	20.8; 6	35.3; 10	10.3; 2	8.8; 2	1.2; 0	14.5
Sondaxe/La Voz de Galicia	28 Jan–3 Feb 2019	400	64.9	28.4; 8	28.8; 8	19.9; 5	9.4; 2	–	8.5; 2	0.4
Sondaxe/La Voz de Galicia	2–14 May 2018	400	?	32.4; 9	31.9; 9	17.2; 4	8.4; 2	6.8; 1	–	0.5
Edesga/Compostela Aberta	5–11 Feb 2018	810	?	37.7; 10/11	28.2; 7/8	16.6; 4	7.2; 2	5.3; 1	–	9.5
Sondaxe/La Voz de Galicia	17 Dec 2017	?	?	39.5; 11	31.7; 9	12.4; 3	8.8; 2	4.5; 0	–	7.8
Sondaxe/La Voz de Galicia	5–11 May 2017	?	58.1	38.6; 10	35.1; 10	11.1; 3	7.8; 2	4.3; 0	–	3.5
Sondaxe/La Voz de Galicia	15 Nov–21 Dec 2016	?	?	34.1; 10	33.7; 9	14.3; 4	7.1; 2	3.8; 0	–	0.4
2015 municipal election	24 May 2015	—N/a	61.1	34.6; 10	33.6; 9	14.7; 4	6.9; 2	4.8; 0	–	1.0

=== Sarria ===
Polling firm/Commissioner	Fieldwork date	Sample size	Turnout	PP	PSdeG–PSOE	CxG	BNG	CS	Cs	Podemos (Spanish political party)	Ga.S	Lead
2019 municipal election	26 May 2019	—N/a	73.4	24.8; 6	12.4; 2	2.0; 0	11.6; 2	28.7; 6	3.9; 0	3.3; 0	6.9; 1	3.9
Infortécnica/El Progreso	18 May 2019	?	?	27.3; 5	26.5; 5	? 1	9.1; 2	13.6; 2	? 1	? 1	–	0.8
2015 municipal election	24 May 2015	—N/a	73.3	37.7; 7	23.7; 4	15.7; 3	12.5; 2	–	–	–	–	14.0

=== Verín ===
Polling firm/Commissioner	Fieldwork date	Sample size	Turnout	PP	PSdeG–PSOE	BNG	Lead
2019 municipal election	26 May 2019	—N/a	70.8	23.8; 4	46.4; 8	26.2; 5	20.2
Infortéctica/La Región	1 Jul 2018	240	?	? 5/6	? 7/8	? 4	?
2015 municipal election	24 May 2015	—N/a	65.9	38.1; 7	31.0; 6	24.1; 4	7.1

=== Vigo ===
Color key:

Poll conducted after legal ban on opinion polls Exit poll

Polling firm/Commissioner	Fieldwork date	Sample size	Turnout	PSdeG–PSOE	PP	Marea de Vigo	BNG	Cs	Vox	Lead
2019 municipal election	26 May 2019	—N/a	62.7	67.6; 20	13.7; 4	7.0; 2	5.7; 1	2.4; 0	1.3; 0	53.9
GfK/FORTA	26 May 2019	?	?	63.2; 19/21	14.1; 3/4	8.8; 2/3	5.9; 0/1	3.1; 0/1	–	49.1
Sondaxe/La Voz de Galicia	21–24 May 2019	300	63.1	66.2; 20	14.3; 4	6.8; 2	5.4; 1	1.7; 0	0.7; 0	45.6
Sondaxe/La Voz de Galicia	16–19 May 2019	300	64.8	60.8; 18	15.2; 4	10.1; 3	6.5; 2	4.4; 0	0.7; 0	45.6
Infortécnica/Atlántico	18 May 2019	?	?	68.0; 19	18.0; 5	5.0; 1	? 0/1	? 0/1	? 0/1	50.0
Sondaxe/La Voz de Galicia	15–18 May 2019	300	64.9	63.5; 19	13.8; 4	8.2; 2	6.4; 2	2.8; 0	0.5; 0	49.7
Sondaxe/La Voz de Galicia	14–17 May 2019	300	67.3	62.5; 18	16.8; 5	6.9; 2	6.6; 2	2.5; 0	0.7; 0	45.7
Sondaxe/La Voz de Galicia	13–16 May 2019	300	68.3	64.0; 19	13.4; 4	7.0; 2	7.4; 2	2.9; 0	0.7; 0	50.6
Sondaxe/La Voz de Galicia	12–15 May 2019	300	65.8	65.1; 19	13.5; 4	6.6; 2	7.0; 2	3.6; 0	1.2; 0	51.6
DYM/Faro de Vigo	10–15 May 2019	?	?	66.0; 20/21	15.0; 4	9.0; 2	4.0; 0/1	3.0; 0	2.0; 0	51.0
Sondaxe/La Voz de Galicia	11–14 May 2019	300	68.4	61.7; 19	15.7; 5	6.2; 1	8.0; 2	2.9; 0	0.5; 0	46.0
Sondaxe/La Voz de Galicia	10–13 May 2019	300	69.8	68.0; 20	13.1; 4	5.9; 1	7.1; 2	3.5; 0	0.5; 0	54.9
Sondaxe/La Voz de Galicia	9–12 May 2019	300	73.1	66.4; 20	13.6; 4	6.3; 1	6.5; 2	2.7; 0	2.4; 0	52.8
Sondaxe/La Voz de Galicia	8–11 May 2019	300	75.2	65.7; 20	15.2; 4	6.4; 2	6.3; 1	–	–	50.5
Sondaxe/La Voz de Galicia	7–10 May 2019	300	71.1	64.6; 20	13.4; 4	7.9; 2	6.2; 1	–	–	51.2
Sondaxe/La Voz de Galicia	28 Jan–3 Feb 2019	400	?	58.7; 18	15.6; 5	10.3; 3	5.5; 1	–	–	43.1
Sondaxe/La Voz de Galicia	2–14 May 2018	400	?	54.6; 17	15.5; 5	13.7; 4	5.7; 1	4.9; 0	–	39.1
Sondaxe/La Voz de Galicia	5–11 May 2017	?	65.2	54.1; 16	16.5; 5	16.5; 5	6.1; 1	–	–	37.6
2015 municipal election	24 May 2015	—N/a	61.1	51.8; 17	20.5; 7	11.5; 3	4.8; 0	–	–	31.3

=== Vilagarcía de Arousa ===
Polling firm/Commissioner	Fieldwork date	Sample size	Turnout	PSdeG–PSOE	PP	VeC	BNG	PDDdG	MV	Cs	Lead
2019 municipal election	26 May 2019	—N/a	60.1	47.5; 12	22.9; 5	6.7; 1	7.9; 1	(Note: Within En Marea.)	6.2; 1	5.1; 1	24.6
DYM/Prensa Ibérica	19 May 2019	203	64.8	45.0; 10/11	19.0; 5/6	4.0; 0/1	9.0; 2		8.0; 1	11.0; 2	26.0
Sondaxe/La Voz de Galicia	9–15 May 2019	300	62.7	40.6; 10	22.4; 5	8.8; 2	7.2; 1		13.6; 3	–	18.2
Sondaxe/La Voz de Galicia	28 Jan–3 Feb 2019	300	59.8	43.8; 10	24.0; 6		11.3; 2		15.0; 3	–	19.8
Sondaxe/La Voz de Galicia	16–25 Oct 2018	?	?	45.0; 10	28.7; 7		7.0; 1		15.3; 3	–	16.3
2015 municipal election	24 May 2015	—N/a	60.9	34.2; 8	29.4; 7	15.5; 3	9.2; 2	8.2; 1	–	–	4.8

=== Vilalba ===
Polling firm/Commissioner	Fieldwork date	Sample size	Turnout	PP	PSdeG–PSOE	PDDdG	BNG	VA–SC	Lead
2019 municipal election	26 May 2019	—N/a	71.3	39.7; 7	43.8; 8	–	3.9; 0	11.5; 2	4.1
Infortécnica/El Progreso	18 May 2019	?	?	45.0; 8	28.0; 5	–	10.0; 1	20.0; 3	17.0
2015 municipal election	24 May 2015	—N/a	68.9	47.1; 9	36.4; 6	7.6; 1	6.6; 1	(Note: Within PDDdG.)	10.7

=== Viveiro ===
Polling firm/Commissioner	Fieldwork date	Sample size	Turnout	PSdeG–PSOE	PP	BNG	Son	xV	Lead
2019 municipal election	26 May 2019	—N/a	66.8	45.4; 8	25.5; 5	7.5; 1	5.4; 1	14.1; 2	19.9
Infortécnica/El Progreso	17 May 2019	?	?	37.1; 8	23.9; 5	? 1	? 1	15.1; 2	13.2
Sondaxe/La Voz de Galicia	10–16 May 2019	300	67.4	50.6; 10	22.8; 4	9.1; 1	–	11.7; 2	27.8
2015 municipal election	24 May 2015	—N/a	67.1	45.6; 8	27.0; 5	16.2; 3	6.4; 1	–	18.6

=== Xinzo de Limia ===
Polling firm/Commissioner	Fieldwork date	Sample size	Turnout	PP	PSdeG–PSOE	XA	BNG	Cs	AXIL	CxG	Lead
2019 municipal election	26 May 2019	—N/a	74.9	33.2; 5	25.1; 3	8.2; 1	6.9; 1	9.9; 1	14.8; 2	0.3; 0	8.1
Infortécnica/La Región	30 Apr–May 2019	?	?	35.1; 5/6	28.8; 3/4	3.6; 0/1	14.4; 2	13.5; 2	2.7; 0/1	1.8; 0	6.3
Infortécnica/La Región	15 Jul 2018	204	?	? 6/7	? 2/3	? 3	? 0/1	? 0/1	–	–	?
2015 municipal election	24 May 2015	—N/a	73.3	46.0; 9	25.2; 4	18.6; 3	8.7; 1	–	–	–	20.8
