= Opinion polling for the 2019 Spanish local elections (Andalusia) =

Surveys held before the 2019 Spanish local election

In the run up to the 2019 Spanish local elections, various organisations carried out opinion polling to gauge voting intention in local entities in Spain. Results of such polls for municipalities in Andalusia are displayed in this article. The date range for these opinion polls is from the previous local elections, held on 24 May 2015, to the day the next elections were held, on 26 May 2019.

Polls are listed in reverse chronological order, showing the most recent first and using the dates when the survey fieldwork was done, as opposed to the date of publication. Where the fieldwork dates are unknown, the date of publication is given instead. The highest percentage figure in each polling survey is displayed with its background shaded in the leading party's colour. If a tie ensues, this is applied to the figures with the highest percentages. The "Lead" columns on the right shows the percentage-point difference between the parties with the highest percentages in a given poll.

== Municipalities ==
=== Alcalá de los Gazules ===
Polling firm/Commissioner	Fieldwork date	Sample size	Turnout	PSOE–A	PP	IULV	Lead
2019 municipal election	26 May 2019	—N/a	66.1	72.4; 10	9.9; 1	16.8; 2	55.6
Insobel/8TV	8–10 May 2018	400	?	71.4; 10/11	13.4; 1/2	14.0; 1/2	57.4
2015 municipal election	24 May 2015	—N/a	69.6	68.9; 10	16.3; 2	13.7; 1	52.6

=== Algeciras ===
Polling firm/Commissioner	Fieldwork date	Sample size	Turnout	PP	PSOE–A	ASSP	Cs	IULV	Vox	Adelante Andalucía (2018)	Lead
2019 municipal election	26 May 2019	—N/a	49.1	41.3; 13	26.6; 8	(Note: Within AA.)	8.0; 2		8.3; 2	9.3; 2	14.7
SW Demoscopia/Grupo Viva	21 Feb–1 Mar 2018	721	?	45.9; 14/15	22.8; 6/7	8.6; 2/3	12.4; 3/4	5.8; 0/1	–	–	23.1
2015 municipal election	24 May 2015	—N/a	45.8	43.9; 14	21.6; 6	11.9; 3	7.4; 2	7.2; 2	–	–	22.3

=== Almería ===
Polling firm/Commissioner	Fieldwork date	Sample size	Turnout	PP	PSOE–A	Cs	IULV	Ahora	Podemos	Vox	Lead
2019 municipal election	26 May 2019	—N/a	54.9	43.5; 13	30.1; 9	7.7; 2	4.2; 0	–	5.3; 1	7.8; 2	13.4
Deimos/La Voz de Almería	15–17 May 2019	606	?	35.9; 9/10	29.4; 8/9	11.6; 3/4	2.7; 0/1	–	6.9; 1/3	9.8; 2/3	6.5
Celeste-Tel/La Opinión de Almería	21–24 Nov 2017	500	50.1	39.5; 12	28.2; 9	13.7; 4	6.5; 2	3.3; 0	2.8; 0	–	11.3
SW Demoscopia/Grupo Viva	20 Nov 2017	?	?	42.5; 14	22.4; 7	9.5; 3	11.7; 3	2.6; 0	4.1; 0	–	20.1
2015 municipal election	24 May 2015	—N/a	52.8	40.4; 13	27.0; 9	10.0; 3	7.0; 2	3.7; 0	3.5*; 0	–	13.4
(*) Results for Let's Win Almería Yes We Can.

=== Almuñecar ===
Polling firm/Commissioner	Fieldwork date	Sample size	Turnout	PP	PA	PSOE–A	PMAS	IULV	Cs	CAnda	Adelante Andalucía (2018)	Vox	Lead
2019 municipal election	26 May 2019	—N/a	64.1	24.5; 6	–	14.8; 3	9.2; 2		8.5; 2	32.0; 7	6.6; 1	3.7; 0	7.5
GA Consulting/La Voz de Granada	9–14 May 2019	638	?	18.1; 4	–	21.4; 5	8.1; 1/2		14.7; 2/3	23.2; 5	9.9; 1/2	5.2; 1	1.8
2015 municipal election	24 May 2015	—N/a	64.8	35.6; 8	29.0; 7	15.0; 3	7.9; 2	7.0; 1	3.1; 0	–	–	–	6.6

=== Arcos de la Frontera ===
Polling firm/Commissioner	Fieldwork date	Sample size	Turnout	PSOE–A	PP	AiPro	AeC	Ven–T	IULV	Cs	Adelante Andalucía (2018)	Lead
2019 municipal election	26 May 2019	—N/a	58.2	48.0; 11	22.2; 5	12.4; 3		–		8.3; 2	4.7; 0	25.8
Insobel/8TV	19–22 Apr 2018	400	?	37.5; 9	21.5; 5	16.5; 3/4	5.4; 1	4.0; 0	–	11.8; 2/3	–	16.0
2015 municipal election	24 May 2015	—N/a	65.4	39.3; 10	26.0; 6	17.0; 4	6.8; 1	4.8; 0	4.0; 0	–	–	13.3

=== Barbate ===
Polling firm/Commissioner	Fieldwork date	Sample size	Turnout	PA	PSOE–A	PP	SB	IULV	AxSí	Lead
2019 municipal election	26 May 2019	—N/a	58.9	–	10.5; 2	9.3; 2	–	4.3; 0	70.0; 17	59.5
Insobel/8TV	21–23 May 2018	400	?	–	16.2; 3/4	13.0; 3	6.0; 1	9.5; 2	49.8; 11/12	33.6
2015 municipal election	24 May 2015	—N/a	59.6	39.3; 8	19.3; 5	17.5; 4	12.3; 3	7.4; 1	–	20.0

=== Baza ===
Polling firm/Commissioner	Fieldwork date	Sample size	Turnout	PSOE–A	PP	IULV	PA	Cs	Vox	Lead
2019 municipal election	26 May 2019	—N/a	64.3	46.3; 11	14.4; 3	8.3; 1	–	22.5; 5	7.4; 1	23.8
GA Consulting/La Voz de Granada	9–14 May 2019	638	?	42.0; 9/10	17.0; 3/4	10.4; 1/2	–	18.3; 3/4	7.9; 1	23.7
2015 municipal election	24 May 2015	—N/a	61.3	47.3; 12	27.5; 6	7.2; 1	7.0; 1	5.2; 1	–	19.8

=== Cádiz ===
Polling firm/Commissioner	Fieldwork date	Sample size	Turnout	PP	Podemos	PSOE–A	Ganar Cádiz	Cs	Vox	Adelante Andalucía (2018)	Lead
2019 municipal election	26 May 2019	—N/a	62.6	22.0; 6		17.2; 5		11.0; 3	3.8; 0	43.6; 13	21.6
Dataestudios/La Voz de Cádiz	6–10 May 2019	408	?	21.4; 6/7		17.4; 5/6		10.6; 2/3	4.7; 0/1	41.3; 13/14	29.9
SW Demoscopia/Grupo Viva	8–11 Apr 2019	800	?	22.6; 6		20.0; 6		10.7; 3	5.8; 1	36.2; 11	13.6
Dataestudios/La Voz de Cádiz	24–29 Sep 2018	400	?	23.7; 7	28.3; 9	18.6; 5	6.0; 1	15.9; 5	–	–	4.6
Insobel/8TV	15 Jun 2018	500	?	23.9; 7	28.1; 8	22.4; 6/7	5.5; 1	16.4; 4/5	–	–	4.2
Podemos	9–25 May 2017	2,500	?	30.6; 9	32.1; 10	16.0; 5	5.4; 1	9.6; 2	–	–	1.5
Insobel/8TV Cádiz	15–19 May 2017	400	?	36.5; 11	26.9; 8	19.0; 6	6.1; 1	5.9; 1	–	–	9.6
SW Demoscopia/Grupo Viva	9–12 May 2017	514	?	? 8/9	? 9/10	? 5/6	? 0/1	9.8; 2/3	–	–	?
Insobel/8TV Cádiz	7–11 Jun 2016	400	?	37.8; 11/12	30.2; 9	18.7; 5/6	4.2; 0/1	5.2; 1	–	–	7.6
NC Report/La Razón	26 Jul–8 Aug 2015	900	57.7	34.5; 10	25.9; 7	18.1; 5	10.9; 3	6.8; 2	–	–	8.6
2015 municipal election	24 May 2015	—N/a	65.3	33.8; 10	27.9*; 8	17.3; 5	8.4; 2	7.2; 2	0.3; 0	–	5.9
(*) Results for For Cádiz Yes We Can.

=== Carmona ===
Polling firm/Commissioner	Fieldwork date	Sample size	Turnout	PP	PSOE–A	IULV	Podemos	Cs	Vox	Lead
2019 municipal election	26 May 2019	—N/a	58.8	57.1; 13	21.3; 5	13.7; 3	2.2; 0	3.2; 0	1.8; 0	35.8
PSOE	15 May 2019	400	?	36.6; 8/9	27.4; 7/8	18.5; 4/5	3.3; 0	8.1; 1	5.2; 0/1	9.2
2015 municipal election	24 May 2015	—N/a	57.6	42.1; 10	22.7; 5	20.7; 5	5.0*; 1	–	–	19.4
(*) Results for Participatory Democracy–Carmona.

=== Cartaya ===
Polling firm/Commissioner	Fieldwork date	Sample size	Turnout	PSOE–A	ICar	PP	IULV	PA	Cs	Adelante Andalucía (2018)	Lead
2019 municipal election	26 May 2019	—N/a	62.0	39.3; 7	27.1; 5	16.3; 3		–	6.7; 1	8.5; 1	12.2
Dialoga Consultores/PSOE	3 Oct 2018	800	?	41.5; 8/9	15.4; 3/4	18.9; 3/4	? 0/1	–	? 0/1	–	22.6
2015 municipal election	24 May 2015	—N/a	61.3	33.5; 6	24.1; 5	17.8; 3	10.1; 2	8.6; 1	–	–	9.4

=== Chiclana de la Frontera ===
Polling firm/Commissioner	Fieldwork date	Sample size	Turnout	PSOE–A	PP	IULV	Podemos	GCH	Cs	AxSí	Vox	Lead
2019 municipal election	26 May 2019	—N/a	46.6	33.2; 9	21.7; 6	7.6; 2	8.4; 2	6.8; 2	13.6; 3	–	6.6; 1	11.5
Mercadinamica	30 Apr 2019	?	?	26.3; 7/8	25.4; 7	3.7; 0/1	8.2; 2	5.1; 0/1	18.7; 4/5	–	12.6; 3/4	0.9
SW Demoscopia/Grupo Viva	1–7 Jun 2018	600	?	42.6; 12/13	20.4; 6/7	10.9; 2/3	6.1; 0/1	6.2; 1/2	8.9; 1/2	1.2; 0	–	22.2
Insobel/8TV	23–25 May 2018	500	?	34.1; 10	25.0; 7	11.2; 3	9.4; 2	9.7; 2	6.6; 1	–	–	9.1
Insobel/8TV	1–7 Jun 2016	400	?	36.7; 10	22.2; 6	7.6; 2	17.3; 5	7.6; 2	–	–	–	14.5
2015 municipal election	24 May 2015	—N/a	48.7	36.8; 11	26.6; 8	11.1; 3	9.9*; 2	5.8; 1	–	–	–	10.2
(*) Results for For Chiclana Yes We Can.

=== Conil de la Frontera ===
Polling firm/Commissioner	Fieldwork date	Sample size	Turnout	IULV	PSOE–A	PP	PA	AxSí	Cs	Lead
2019 municipal election	26 May 2019	—N/a	58.2	41.5; 9	22.2; 5	12.0; 2	–	17.1; 4	6.2; 1	19.3
Insobel/8TV	14–16 May 2018	400	?	53.9; 12	24.1; 5	10.0; 2	–	10.8; 2	–	29.8
2015 municipal election	24 May 2015	—N/a	55.0	45.8; 11	28.9; 6	11.8; 2	11.7; 2	–	–	16.9

=== Córdoba ===
Polling firm/Commissioner	Fieldwork date	Sample size	Turnout	PP	PSOE–A	GC	IULV	Cs	UCOR	Vox	Podemos	Lead
2019 municipal election	26 May 2019	—N/a	56.4	29.8; 9	27.0; 8	(Note: Within Podemos.)	10.8; 3	15.2; 5	–	8.0; 2	6.1; 2	2.8
Dataestudios/ABC	20 May 2019	?	?	25.2; 7/8	27.8; 9/10	2.6; 0	13.5; 4	15.5; 5	–	6.8; 2/3	5.3; 0/1	2.6
Deimos/Ondamezquita TV	6–8 May 2019	443	67.8	24.1; 7/8	25.8; 7/9	–	10.8; 3/4	14.3; 4/5	–	9.4; 2/3	13.0; 3/4	1.7
Dataestudios/ABC	17–22 Sep 2018	402	?	28.2; 9/10	23.0; 7/8	11.2; 3	13.3; 4	14.4; 5	3.4; 0	–	1.8; 0	5.2
PSOE	7 Jul 2018	?	?	25.5; 8	29.2; 9	10.5; 3	9.0; 3	19.0; 6	1.2; 0	–	–	3.7
PP	11–19 Jun 2018	404	?	29.7; 10	23.0; 7	8.9; 2	12.0; 4	20.0; 6	–	1.0; 0	–	6.7
PP	Jan 2018	?	?	26.8; 8/9	20.5; 6/7	9.5; 2/3	16.4; 5	22.0; 6/7	–	–	–	4.8
SW Demoscopia/Grupo Viva	5 Oct–4 Nov 2017	?	?	30.5; 10/11	20.7; 7/8	10.6; 3/4	14.4; 3/4	15.4; 4/5	6.8; 0/1	–	–	9.8
2015 municipal election	24 May 2015	—N/a	57.1	34.7; 11	20.6; 7	12.6; 4	12.0; 4	8.6; 2	5.7; 1	0.3; 0	–	14.1

=== El Puerto de Santa María ===
Polling firm/Commissioner	Fieldwork date	Sample size	Turnout	PP	PSOE–A	L	IULV	Cs	PA	Podemos	AxSí	Vox	Adelante Andalucía (2018)	UP	Lead
2019 municipal election	26 May 2019	—N/a	53.6	29.4; 9	27.1; 8	4.8; 0		9.4; 2	–		3.8; 0	7.5; 2	11.1; 3	6.0; 1	2.3
Insobel/8TV	30 May–1 Jun 2018	500	?	21.0; 6	23.2; 7	5.4; 1	9.4; 2/3	15.5; 4/5	–	10.7; 3	2.8; 0	–	–	–	1.2
elmira.es	28 May 2018	600	?	31.6; 9	19.0; 5	5.9; 1	7.6; 2	17.5; 4	–	11.7; 3	5.3; 1	–	–	–	12.6
2015 municipal election	24 May 2015	—N/a	50.7	31.7; 9	20.3; 6	15.2; 4	10.4; 3	9.5; 2	6.4; 1	–	–	–	–	–	11.4

=== El Viso del Alcor ===
Polling firm/Commissioner	Fieldwork date	Sample size	Turnout	PSOE–A	IULV	PP	Cs	Vox	Lead
2019 municipal election	26 May 2019	—N/a	70.2	53.3; 10	22.7; 4	13.6; 2	6.5; 1	2.8; 0	30.6
Dialoga Consultores	29–30 Apr 2019	400	?	44.0; 8/9	25.2; 4/5	14.2; 2/3	13.2; 2/3	1.8; 0	18.8
2015 municipal election	24 May 2015	—N/a	71.5	46.0; 8	27.9; 5	24.5; 4	–	–	18.1

=== Granada ===
Polling firm/Commissioner	Fieldwork date	Sample size	Turnout	PP	PSOE–A	Cs	VG	IULV	Vox	Adelante Andalucía (2018)	Lead
2019 municipal election	26 May 2019	—N/a	60.9	23.8; 7	32.5; 10	14.8; 4	2.4; 0		9.5; 3	10.0; 3	8.7
GA Consulting/La Voz de Granada	9–14 May 2019	638	?	23.0; 7/8	25.0; 8/10	18.0; 5/6	4.7; 0/1		7.8; 1/2	14.7; 3/4	2.0
PSOE	13 Apr 2019	?	?	? 8	? 8	? 5	–		? 3	? 3	Tie
Cs	13 Apr 2019	?	?	? 6	? 7	? 8	–		? 2	? 4	?
SW Demoscopia/Grupo Viva	21 Nov–4 Dec 2017	605	?	25.4; 7	28.7; 9	22.3; 7	11.6; 3	6.0; 1	–	–	3.3
Bevents/PP	20–22 Apr 2016	500	?	39.9; 12/13	24.4; 7/8	12.3; 3	9.1; 2/3	6.4; 2	–	–	15.5
2015 municipal election	24 May 2015	—N/a	59.8	35.6; 11	25.9; 8	14.1; 4	12.8; 3	5.9; 1	0.9; 0	–	9.7

=== Guadix ===
Polling firm/Commissioner	Fieldwork date	Sample size	Turnout	PSOE–A	PP	AGX	IULV	Cs	PA	Adelante Andalucía (2018)	Vox	Lead
2019 municipal election	26 May 2019	—N/a	64.4	27.1; 5	38.6; 8	7.1; 1		12.9; 2	–	7.5; 1	4.5; 0	11.5
GA Consulting/La Voz de Granada	9–14 May 2019	638	?	38.0; 7/8	18.9; 3/4	8.4; 1		12.7; 2	–	9.8; 1/2	5.1; 0/1	15.1
2015 municipal election	24 May 2015	—N/a	61.0	37.1; 7	36.7; 7	7.6; 1	6.5; 1	6.0; 1	5.0; 0	–	–	0.4

=== Huelva ===
Polling firm/Commissioner	Fieldwork date	Sample size	Turnout	PSOE–A	PP	Cs	IULV	MRH	PH	Vox	Adelante Andalucía (2018)	Lead
2019 municipal election	26 May 2019	—N/a	51.2	45.2; 14	16.1; 4	9.7; 3		7.8; 2		6.9; 2	9.4; 2	29.1
SW Demoscopia/Grupo Viva	9–16 Jan 2018	?	?	39.7; 12/13	19.1; 5/6	17.8; 5/6	8.7; 1/2	5.1; 0/1	5.3; 0/1	–	–	20.6
2015 municipal election	24 May 2015	—N/a	52.1	35.3; 11	26.7; 8	10.1; 3	10.0; 3	6.4; 1	5.3; 1	–	–	8.6

=== Jaén ===
Polling firm/Commissioner	Fieldwork date	Sample size	Turnout	PP	PSOE–A	Cs	JeC	IULV	Vox	Adelante Andalucía (2018)	Lead
2019 municipal election	26 May 2019	—N/a	59.9	27.0; 8	37.0; 11	15.4; 4	3.7; 0		6.3; 2	6.3; 2	10.0
SW Demoscopia/Grupo Viva	2–5 Jan 2018	?	?	30.1; 9/10	28.4; 8/9	25.0; 7/8	7.3; 2/3	3.9; 0/1	–	–	1.7
NC Report	17 Dec 2017	1,100	?	37.4; 11	28.4; 9	14.3; 4	10.0; 3	3.8; 0	–	–	9.0
2015 municipal election	24 May 2015	—N/a	60.9	38.4; 12	29.5; 9	11.3; 3	10.3; 3	4.1; 0	–	–	8.9

=== Jerez de la Frontera ===
Polling firm/Commissioner	Fieldwork date	Sample size	Turnout	PP	PSOE–A	GJ	Cs	IULV	Podemos	Adelante Andalucía (2018)	J	Vox	Lead
2019 municipal election	26 May 2019	—N/a	52.2	28.3; 9	32.1; 10	5.3; 1	13.7; 4			11.2; 3	2.9; 0	4.8; 0	3.8
Andaluza Demoscópica DC	16 Jun 2018	?	?	38.2; 12	24.0; 7	(Note: Within Unidas Podemos.)	6.1; 1/2			21.4; 6/7	1.2; 0	–	14.2
PP	23 Feb 2018	600	?	37.7; 11/12	23.1; 6/7	5.4; 1	11.8; 2/3	6.9; 2	12.2; 3/4	–	–	–	14.6
SW Demoscopia/Grupo Viva	28 Apr–9 May 2017	606	?	? 9/10	? 8/9	? 4/5	13.3; 3/4	? 1/2	–	–	–	–	?
2015 municipal election	24 May 2015	—N/a	54.7	34.1; 11	24.2; 7	16.2; 5	8.9; 2	7.3; 2	–	–	–	–	9.9

=== Málaga ===
Polling firm/Commissioner	Fieldwork date	Sample size	Turnout	PP	PSOE–A	Málaga Ahora	Cs	IULV	Vox	Adelante Andalucía (2018)	Lead
2019 municipal election	26 May 2019	—N/a	55.5	39.8; 14	32.5; 12	1.9; 0	7.8; 2		4.4; 0	10.6; 3	7.3
Metroscopia/PP	7–9 May 2019	1,000	?	32.0– 33.0; 12	29.0– 30.0; 10/11	5.0; 0/1	11.0– 12.0; 3/4		3.0– 5.0; 0/1	12.0– 13.0; 4	3.0
Celeste-Tel/PSOE	24 Apr–2 May 2019	1,000	56.9	26.7; 9	28.7; 10	7.8; 2	13.6; 4		7.1; 2	12.1; 4	2.0
ElectoPanel/Electomanía	31 Mar–7 Apr 2019	?	?	33.5; 11	23.0; 8		13.6; 4		9.1; 3	16.8; 5	10.5
ElectoPanel/Electomanía	24–31 Mar 2019	?	?	32.6; 11	23.1; 8		14.2; 4		9.2; 3	17.0; 5	9.5
ElectoPanel/Electomanía	17–24 Mar 2019	?	?	32.8; 11	23.6; 8		13.9; 4		9.0; 3	16.7; 5	9.2
ElectoPanel/Electomanía	10–17 Mar 2019	?	?	33.1; 11	22.6; 7		13.2; 4		10.6; 3	17.3; 6	10.5
ElectoPanel/Electomanía	3–10 Mar 2019	?	?	32.9; 11	22.3; 8	10.8; 3	13.6; 4	7.1; 2	10.4; 3	–	10.6
ElectoPanel/Electomanía	22 Feb–3 Mar 2019	?	?	33.9; 12	22.0; 7	10.9; 3	14.0; 4	7.0; 2	9.3; 3	–	11.9
Metroscopia/PP	28–31 Jan 2019	1,000	?	34.5; 11/12	20.2; 6/7	9.8; 3	16.0; 5	9.1; 3	6.2; 2	–	14.3
Metroscopia/PP	11–13 Apr 2018	1,000	?	34.8; 12	21.8; 7	8.5; 3	18.3; 6	11.1; 3	–	–	13.0
SW Demoscopia/Grupo Viva	3–12 Jul 2017	?	?	39.3; 14	24.5; 8	10.4; 3	10.0; 3	9.3; 3	–	–	14.8
2015 municipal election	24 May 2015	—N/a	54.4	36.6; 13	26.2; 9	13.3; 4	10.4; 3	7.4; 2	0.3; 0	–	10.4

=== Marbella ===
Polling firm/Commissioner	Fieldwork date	Sample size	Turnout	PP	PSOE–A	OSP	Podemos	IULV	Cs	Unidas Podemos	Vox	UCIN	Lead
2019 municipal election	26 May 2019	—N/a	52.6	40.3; 14	31.3; 10	6.8; 2	2.6; 0	4.3; 0	5.5; 1	–	3.3; 0	1.8; 0	9.0
Deimos/Marbella Confidencial	14–17 May 2019	413	?	32.3; 9/10	28.1; 7/9	6.8; 1/3	7.5; 2/3	2.0; 0/1	9.6; 2/3	–	9.7; 2/3	2.7; 0/1	4.2
Deimos/Marbella Confidencial	9–11 Apr 2018	412	?	44.4; 13/14	26.5; 8	6.4; 1/2	8.2; 2	5.6; 0/2	6.4; 1/2	–	–	–	17.9
Deimos/Marbella Confidencial	1–4 Jun 2017	406	?	34.1; 10	32.9; 9	7.4; 2			6.7; 1/2	16.9; 4/5	–	–	1.2
Deimos/Marbella Confidencial	1–4 Jun 2017	406	?	35.1; 10/11	33.3; 10	8.7; 2/3	7.1; 2	5.3; 1	6.8; 1/2	–	–	–	1.8
Deimos/Marbella Confidencial	8–9 Jun 2016	406	?	36.2; 11	26.0; 8	5.0; 0/1	10.1; 3	7.4; 2	9.5; 2/3	–	–	–	10.2
2015 municipal election	24 May 2015	—N/a	53.6	41.0; 13	26.3; 8	9.2; 2	8.2*; 2	6.8; 2	–	–	–	–	14.7
(*) Results for Costa del Sol Can... Tic Tac.

=== Mijas ===
Polling firm/Commissioner	Fieldwork date	Sample size	Turnout	PP	PSOE–A	Cs	CSSP	Podemos	Vox	Lead
2019 municipal election	26 May 2019	—N/a	52.6	30.4; 9	27.5; 8	21.3; 6	1.3; 0	5.9; 1	5.6; 1	2.9
SW Demoscopia/Cs	8 Feb 2018	?	?	27.8; 7/8	24.5; 6/7	33.7; 9/10	6.4; 1	–	–	5.9
2015 municipal election	24 May 2015	—N/a	54.5	36.4; 11	26.2; 7	17.1; 5	7.3; 2	–	–	10.2

=== Motril ===
Polling firm/Commissioner	Fieldwork date	Sample size	Turnout	PP	PSOE–A	PA	IULV	Cs	Podemos	Vox	AxSí	PMAS	MD	Lead
2019 municipal election	26 May 2019	—N/a	57.8	27.9; 8	21.8; 6	–	7.0; 2	7.6; 2	4.0; 0	6.3; 1	9.6; 3	11.1; 3	3.7; 0	6.1
GA Consulting/La Voz de Granada	9–14 May 2019	638	?	16.1; 5/6	27.2; 8/9	–	5.1; 1/2	13.4; 3/4	8.0; 1/2	9.2; 1/2	11.8; 3	4.8; 0/1	5.1; 0/1	11.1
2015 municipal election	24 May 2015	—N/a	56.4	31.8; 10	22.8; 7	16.4; 5	11.2; 3	5.0; 0	–	–	–	–	–	9.0

=== Ronda ===
Polling firm/Commissioner	Fieldwork date	Sample size	Turnout	PP	PSOE–A	APR	PA	IULV	Cs	CSD	Lead
2019 municipal election	26 May 2019	—N/a	58.1	34.6; 9	26.6; 6	12.6; 3	–	6.5; 1	6.4; 1	5.3; 1	8.0
APR	29 Mar–7 Apr 2017	415	?	? 8	? 6	? 5	–	? 2	–	–	?
2015 municipal election	24 May 2015	—N/a	53.8	29.5; 7	26.2; 6	12.8; 3	11.8; 3	9.3; 2	–	–	3.3

=== San Fernando ===
Polling firm/Commissioner	Fieldwork date	Sample size	Turnout	PSOE–A	PP	Podemos	PA	Cs	AxSí	Vox	Lead
2019 municipal election	26 May 2019	—N/a	52.0	39.2; 11	18.1; 5	7.0; 2	–	10.1; 2	11.0; 3	8.6; 2	21.1
Insobel/8TV	14 Jun 2018	500	?	32.0; 9	21.0; 5/6	17.0; 4/5	–	12.0; 3	13.8; 3	–	11.0
2015 municipal election	24 May 2015	—N/a	52.5	29.8; 8	23.2; 7	14.4*; 4	12.4; 3	10.7; 3	–	–	6.6
(*) Results for Yes We Can San Fernando.

=== San Roque ===
Polling firm/Commissioner	Fieldwork date	Sample size	Turnout	PSOE–A	PP	Podemos	PA	PIVG	IULV	Cs	AxSí	Adelante Andalucía (2018)	SR100	Lead
2019 municipal election	26 May 2019	—N/a	57.7	44.8; 11	20.7; 5		–	6.4; 1		7.2; 1	–	7.2; 1	8.4; 2	24.1
Insobel/8TV	13 Jun 2018	?	?	47.6; 12/13	20.4; 5	10.9; 2/3	–	2.7; 0	–	5.8; 1	2.7; 0	–	–	27.2
2015 municipal election	24 May 2015	—N/a	58.2	42.9; 11	25.3; 6	7.8*; 2	6.7; 1	5.3; 1	3.8; 0	3.4; 0	–	–	–	17.6
(*) Results for San Roque Yes We Can.

=== Ubrique ===
Polling firm/Commissioner	Fieldwork date	Sample size	Turnout	PSOE–A	PP	PA	IULV	AxSí	Cs	Adelante Andalucía (2018)	Lead
2019 municipal election	26 May 2019	—N/a	69.2	58.9; 11	19.8; 4	–		7.5; 1	6.2; 1	4.0; 0	39.1
Insobel/8TV	15–18 May 2018	400	?	52.7; 9/10	25.9; 4/5	–	5.1; 1	14.5; 2	–	–	26.8
2015 municipal election	24 May 2015	—N/a	68.1	45.2; 9	29.8; 5	13.2; 2	5.6; 1	–	–	–	15.4

=== Utrera ===
Polling firm/Commissioner	Fieldwork date	Sample size	Turnout	PSOE–A	PA	IULV	PP	Unidas Podemos	JxU	Cs	Lead
2019 municipal election	26 May 2019	—N/a	58.1	44.9; 14	–	1.8; 0	4.2; 0	–	32.7; 10	6.1; 1	12.2
Dialoga Consultores	15–26 May 2017	?	?	50.8; 16/17	14.6; 3/4		9.3; 2/3	10.6; 2/3	–	–	36.2
2015 municipal election	24 May 2015	—N/a	57.0	43.6; 12	31.8; 9	7.8; 2	7.3; 2	–	–	–	11.8

=== Vejer de la Frontera ===
Polling firm/Commissioner	Fieldwork date	Sample size	Turnout	PP	PSOE–A	IULV	Lead
2019 municipal election	26 May 2019	—N/a	64.4	52.5; 10	36.7; 7	4.1; 0	15.8
Insobel/8TV	3–5 May 2018	400	?	55.6; 10	32.5; 6	6.3; 1	23.1
2015 municipal election	24 May 2015	—N/a	65.8	55.3; 10	34.2; 6	7.4; 1	21.1

=== Villamartín ===
Polling firm/Commissioner	Fieldwork date	Sample size	Turnout	PA	PSOE–A	IULV	PP	AxSí	Adelante Andalucía (2018)	Lead
2019 municipal election	26 May 2019	—N/a	63.2	–	34.3; 6		3.2; 0	51.8; 10	9.7; 1	17.5
Insobel/8TV	10–14 May 2018	400	?	–	29.8; 5/6	7.4; 1	8.8; 1	49.2; 9/10	–	19.4
2015 municipal election	24 May 2015	—N/a	68.1	53.5; 10	27.0; 5	8.1; 1	6.6; 1	–	–	26.5
