= Opinion polling for the 2019 Spanish local elections (Cantabria) =

In the run up to the 2019 Spanish local elections, various organisations carried out opinion polling to gauge voting intention in local entities in Spain. Results of such polls for municipalities in Cantabria are displayed in this article. The date range for these opinion polls is from the previous local elections, held on 24 May 2015, to the day the next elections were held, on 26 May 2019.

Polls are listed in reverse chronological order, showing the most recent first and using the dates when the survey fieldwork was done, as opposed to the date of publication. Where the fieldwork dates are unknown, the date of publication is given instead. The highest percentage figure in each polling survey is displayed with its background shaded in the leading party's colour. If a tie ensues, this is applied to the figures with the highest percentages. The "Lead" columns on the right shows the percentage-point difference between the parties with the highest percentages in a given poll.

== Municipalities ==
=== Camargo ===
Polling firm/Commissioner	Fieldwork date	Sample size	Turnout	PP	PSOE	PRC	IU	Podemos	Cs	Lead
2019 municipal election	26 May 2019	—N/a	68.8	26.9; 6	31.2; 8	15.7; 4	5.0; 0	2.8; 0	11.6; 3	4.3
Cantabria24Horas	11 Nov 2018	?	?	? 7	? 7	? 3	? 1	? 0	? 3	Tie
2015 municipal election	24 May 2015	—N/a	68.9	41.1; 10	23.7; 5	15.2; 3	7.9; 2	6.2 (Note: Results for Ganemos.); 1	–	17.4

=== Castro Urdiales ===
Polling firm/Commissioner	Fieldwork date	Sample size	Turnout	CV	PP	PRC	PSOE	MC– AAC	Podemos	Cs	Vox	Lead
2019 municipal election	26 May 2019	—N/a	64.0	14.8; 3	12.5; 3	23.9; 6	26.1; 6	–	6.5; 1	7.7; 2	3.3; 0	2.2
MuchoCastro	17–19 May 2019	520	?	? 6/7	? 5	? 4	? 3/4	–	? 0	? 1/2	? 0/1	?
MuchoCastro	18–29 Dec 2018	698	?	? 6	? 5	? 3	? 3/4	–	? 1/2	? 1	? 1	?
MuchoCastro	25 May–3 Jun 2018	495	?	19.9; 4/5	23.9; 6	12.2; 3	18.4; 4/5	–	9.0; 2	5.7; 1	–	4.0
MuchoCastro	6–12 Dec 2017	676	?	18.2; 4	25.9; 6	13.8; 3	22.5; 5/6	–	12.7; 2/3	–	–	3.4
2015 municipal election	24 May 2015	—N/a	61.8	29.7; 7	19.4; 5	18.7; 4	15.5; 4	5.8; 1	–	–	–	10.3

=== El Astillero ===
Polling firm/Commissioner	Fieldwork date	Sample size	Turnout	PP	PRC	PSOE	IU	Cs	Lead
2019 municipal election	26 May 2019	—N/a	68.8	14.2; 3	19.1; 4	22.5; 4	5.3; 1	26.7; 5	4.2
Cantabria24Horas	11 Nov 2018	?	?	? 3	? 2	? 4	? 1	? 7	?
2015 municipal election	24 May 2015	—N/a	69.0	33.6; 6	24.1; 5	24.0; 4	12.5; 2	–	9.5

=== Piélagos ===
Polling firm/Commissioner	Fieldwork date	Sample size	Turnout	PP	PRC	AVIP	PSOE	Cs	IU	Lead
2019 municipal election	26 May 2019	—N/a	69.7	35.8; 9	12.5; 3	7.5; 2	25.8; 6	6.5; 1	3.6; 0	10.0
Cantabria24Horas	11 Nov 2018	?	?	? 6	? 5	? 1	? 6	? 3	? 0	Tie
2015 municipal election	24 May 2015	—N/a	68.5	34.4; 8	16.0; 4	14.8; 3	14.1; 3	9.4; 2	7.3; 1	18.4

=== Santander ===
Polling firm/Commissioner	Fieldwork date	Sample size	Turnout	PP	PSOE	PRC	Cs	Podemos	IU	Vox	Unidas Podemos	Lead
2019 municipal election	26 May 2019	—N/a	64.7	35.3; 11	23.4; 7	19.1; 5	8.8; 2	(Note: Within Unidas Podemos.)		5.3; 1	6.1; 1	11.9
Sigma Dos/El Diario Montañés	6–8 May 2019	400	?	29.8; 9	24.2; 7/8	15.8; 5	12.6; 3/4			4.5; 0	8.9; 2	5.6
Sigma Dos/PP	2 Dec 2018	?	?	35.0; 10/11	22.3; 6/7	12.1; 3	13.1; 4			–	11.8; 3	12.7
2015 municipal election	24 May 2015	—N/a	64.3	40.8; 13	17.6; 5	15.4; 4	8.3; 2	6.8 (Note: Results for GSSP.); 2	5.5; 1	0.7; 0	–	23.2

=== Torrelavega ===
Polling firm/Commissioner	Fieldwork date	Sample size	Turnout	PP	PSOE	PRC	TSí	ACPT	Podemos	Cs	Vox	Unidas Podemos	Lead
2019 municipal election	26 May 2019	—N/a	68.8	15.9; 5	26.4; 8	26.8; 8	6.2; 1	8.6; 2		6.3; 1	4.6; 0	3.5; 0	0.4
Sigma Dos/El Diario Montañés	6–8 May 2019	?	?	17.9; 5	29.6; 8/9	19.1; 5/6	5.1; 0/1	7.1; 1/2		6.1; 1	5.5; 1	7.4; 2	10.5
2015 municipal election	24 May 2015	—N/a	69.7	24.5; 7	20.0; 6	17.7; 5	12.6; 4	8.1; 2	5.4 (Note: Results for Torrelavega Puede.); 1	4.6; 0	–	–	4.5
