= Opinion polling for the 2019 Spanish local elections (Region of Murcia) =

In the run up to the 2019 Spanish local elections, various organisations carried out opinion polling to gauge voting intention in local entities in Spain. Results of such polls for municipalities in the Region of Murcia are displayed in this article. The date range for these opinion polls is from the previous local elections, held on 24 May 2015, to the day the next elections were held, on 26 May 2019.

Polls are listed in reverse chronological order, showing the most recent first and using the dates when the survey fieldwork was done, as opposed to the date of publication. Where the fieldwork dates are unknown, the date of publication is given instead. The highest percentage figure in each polling survey is displayed with its background shaded in the leading party's colour. If a tie ensues, this is applied to the figures with the highest percentages. The "Lead" columns on the right shows the percentage-point difference between the parties with the highest percentages in a given poll.

== Municipalities ==
=== Cartagena ===
Polling firm/Commissioner	Fieldwork date	Sample size	Turnout	PP	PSOE	MCC	Cs	Podemos	Vox	Unidas Podemos	Lead
2019 municipal election	26 May 2019	—N/a	57.1	25.5; 7	21.7; 6	27.4; 8	8.2; 2	(Note: Within Unidas Podemos.)	8.0; 2	6.9; 2	1.9
PublicData	20 May 2019	?	?	17.6; 5	30.8; 9/10	13.0; 3/4	14.6; 4		12.0; 3	6.5; 1/2	13.2
Sigma Dos/La Verdad	14–15 May 2019	600	?	23.7; 7	24.8; 7/8	20.5; 6	10.2; 2/3		8.0; 2	8.1; 2	1.1
+Sinergia Creativa	31 Mar 2019	800	54.9	20.4; 6	27.0; 8	15.1; 4	18.9; 5		10.0; 2	8.2; 2	6.6
2015 municipal election	24 May 2015	—N/a	57.8	30.7; 10	17.8; 6	16.9; 5	11.7; 3	11.4 (Note: Results for CTSSP.); 3	1.1; 0	–	12.9

=== Murcia ===
Polling firm/Commissioner	Fieldwork date	Sample size	Turnout	PP	PSOE	Cs	Podemos	CM	Vox	Lead
2019 municipal election	26 May 2019	—N/a	64.6	34.9; 11	28.9; 9	13.5; 4	6.4; 2	2.2; 0	10.2; 3	6.0
Sigma Dos/La Verdad	14–15 May 2019	600	?	31.4; 10	28.7; 9/10	13.4; 4	11.3; 3	3.1; 0	8.6; 2/3	2.7
2015 municipal election	24 May 2015	—N/a	65.3	37.6; 12	19.6; 6	15.4; 5	9.2 (Note: Results for Es Ahora Murcia.); 3	9.1; 3	1.3; 0	18.0

=== Totana ===
Polling firm/Commissioner	Fieldwork date	Sample size	Turnout	PP	PSOE	IU–V–RM	Cs	Vox	AT	Lead
2019 municipal election	26 May 2019	—N/a	61.9	26.9; 6	20.0; 5	27.3; 6	6.6; 1	10.3; 2	6.9; 1	0.4
Celeste-Tel	2–15 May 2017	450	60.7	36.1; 8	23.9; 5	28.1; 7	6.8; 1	–	–	8.0
2015 municipal election	24 May 2015	—N/a	67.2	36.8; 8	25.0; 6	24.6; 6	5.9; 1	–	–	11.8
