= Opinion polling for the 2019 Spanish local elections (Navarre) =

In the run up to the 2019 Spanish local elections, various organisations carried out opinion polling to gauge voting intention in local entities in Spain. Results of such polls for municipalities in Navarre are displayed in this article. The date range for these opinion polls is from the previous local elections, held on 24 May 2015, to the day the next elections were held, on 26 May 2019.

Polls are listed in reverse chronological order, showing the most recent first and using the dates when the survey fieldwork was done, as opposed to the date of publication. Where the fieldwork dates are unknown, the date of publication is given instead. The highest percentage figure in each polling survey is displayed with its background shaded in the leading party's colour. If a tie ensues, this is applied to the figures with the highest percentages. The "Lead" columns on the right shows the percentage-point difference between the parties with the highest percentages in a given poll.

== Municipalities ==
=== Pamplona ===
Color key:

Poll conducted after legal ban on opinion polls

Polling firm/Commissioner	Fieldwork date	Sample size	Turnout	UPN	EH Bildu	GBai	PSN–PSOE	A	I–E	PP	Cs	Podemos	Vox	NA+	Lead
2019 municipal election	26 May 2019	—N/a	71.1	(Note: Within NA+.)	24.8; 7	7.8; 2	16.2; 5	0.8; 0	3.4; 0			3.8; 0	1.1; 0	40.6; 13	15.8
Gizaker/EiTB	24–26 May 2019	600	?		23.3; 7	12.8; 3/4	13.4; 4	1.0; 0	6.0; 1/2			5.7; 1	–	34.4; 10/11	11.1
Gizaker/Grupo Noticias	17 May 2019	375	71.0		22.1; 7	16.4; 5	10.0; 3	6.7; 1/2	4.4; 0/1			4.8; 0/1	4.5; 0/1	30.1; 9/10	8.0
Gizaker/EiTB	14–15 May 2019	400	71		21.2; 7	15.3; 5	11.9; 3/4	3.7; 0	5.0; 1			4.1; 0	2.3; 0	33.9; 11	12.7
CIES/Diario de Navarra	3–13 May 2019	367	71–73		22.4; 6/7	9.5; 3	11.6; 3/4	? 0	? 0			8.3; 2/3	–	38.7; 11/12	16.3
Celeste-Tel/Navarra.com	20 Feb 2019	400	?	? 9	19.0; 6	? 4	13.4; 4	? 2	5.3; 1	<5.0; 0	5.2; 1	–	–	–	?
Gizaker/EiTB	23 Nov–3 Dec 2018	650	?	27.7; 9	22.4; 7	11.9; 4	11.5; 3	5.8; 1	5.0; 1	2.6; 0	8.4; 2	–	1.7; 0	–	5.3
Telwind/Grupo Noticias	3–4 Sep 2018	500	?	29.9; 9/10	19.3; 6/7	15.2; 5	9.6; 3	7.6; 2	5.7; 1	4.0; 0	4.9; 0/1	–	–	–	10.6
Gizaker/EiTB	14–21 May 2018	350	?	29.9; 9	18.5; 5	17.5; 5	10.0; 3	7.0; 2	6.2; 2	2.4; 0	5.5; 1	–	–	–	11.4
Gizaker/EiTB	16–20 May 2017	350	?	27.8; 9	19.5; 6	15.1; 5	11.4; 3	10.3; 3	5.2; 1	3.5; 0	–	–	–	–	8.3
Telwind/Grupo Noticias	3–9 May 2017	500	?	31.1; 10	18.9; 6	14.1; 4	10.6; 3	8.3; 2	6.3; 2	<3.0; 0	4.7; 0	–	–	–	12.2
2015 municipal election	24 May 2015	—N/a	69.4	31.0; 10	16.6; 5	15.7; 5	10.0; 3	9.5; 3	5.7; 1	3.8; 0	3.6; 0	–	–	–	14.4
