= Opinion polling for the 2019 Spanish local elections (Aragon) =

In the run up to the 2019 Spanish local elections, various organisations carried out opinion polling to gauge voting intention in local entities in Spain. Results of such polls for municipalities in Aragon are displayed in this article. The date range for these opinion polls is from the previous local elections, held on 24 May 2015, to the day the next elections were held, on 26 May 2019.

Polls are listed in reverse chronological order, showing the most recent first and using the dates when the survey fieldwork was done, as opposed to the date of publication. Where the fieldwork dates are unknown, the date of publication is given instead. The highest percentage figure in each polling survey is displayed with its background shaded in the leading party's colour. If a tie ensues, this is applied to the figures with the highest percentages. The "Lead" columns on the right shows the percentage-point difference between the parties with the highest percentages in a given poll.

== Municipalities ==
=== Alcañiz ===
Polling firm/Commissioner	Fieldwork date	Sample size	Turnout	PP	IU	PSOE	PAR	Cs	CHA	Podemos	Lead
2019 municipal election	26 May 2019	—N/a	67.3	27.6; 5	6.3; 1	37.1; 7	16.6; 3	7.3; 1	–	3.8; 0	9.5
A+M/Heraldo de Aragón	6–11 May 2019	300	66.5	31.0; 6/7	4.2; 0	29.9; 5/6	11.0; 2	11.7; 2	3.6; 0	6.6; 1	1.1
A+M/Heraldo de Aragón	12–13 Apr 2018	300	67.6	30.8; 5/6	12.1; 2/3	23.7; 4	10.5; 2	12.2; 2/3	1.4; 0	7.1; 1	7.1
2015 municipal election	24 May 2015	—N/a	66.9	35.9; 7	18.0; 3	17.9; 3	14.8; 3	5.2; 1	2.9; 0	2.7 (Note: Results for Ganemos Bajo Aragón.); 0	17.9

=== Andorra ===
Polling firm/Commissioner	Fieldwork date	Sample size	Turnout	IU	PSOE	PP	PAR	CHA	AA	Cs	EA	Lead
2019 municipal election	26 May 2019	—N/a	69.5	16.1; 2	33.8; 5	12.0; 2	13.9; 2	3.5; 0	2.1; 0	7.7; 1	6.2; 1	17.7
A+M/Heraldo de Aragón	12–13 Apr 2018	300	67.3	30.1; 4/5	27.0; 3/4	14.0; 2	5.3; 0/1	3.9; 0	7.8; 1	9.9; 1/2	–	3.1
2015 municipal election	24 May 2015	—N/a	68.7	28.7; 4	22.7; 3	17.0; 2	12.5; 2	9.4; 1	7.4; 1	–	–	6.0

=== Barbastro ===
Polling firm/Commissioner	Fieldwork date	Sample size	Turnout	PSOE	PP	Cs	PAR	CB	CHA	BeC	Vox	Lead
2019 municipal election	26 May 2019	—N/a	64.7	26.5; 5	31.2; 6	11.8; 2	7.5; 1	6.9; 1	3.6; 0	6.1; 1	5.2; 1	4.7
A+M/Heraldo de Aragón	6–11 May 2019	300	70.4	36.3; 7/8	20.7; 4/5	13.7; 2	9.4; 2	6.8; 0/1	3.9; 0	2.8; 0	5.2; 0/1	15.6
A+M/Heraldo de Aragón	12–13 Apr 2018	300	65.5	38.2; 7/8	17.5; 3/4	15.1; 3	10.7; 2	9.9; 1/2	2.5; 0	1.4; 0	–	20.7
2015 municipal election	24 May 2015	—N/a	65.8	37.9; 8	23.2; 5	10.0; 2	8.8; 1	7.3; 1	4.4; 1	–	–	14.7

=== Calamocha ===
Polling firm/Commissioner	Fieldwork date	Sample size	Turnout	PAR	PSOE	PP	CCA	CHA	Cs	Podemos	Lead
2019 municipal election	26 May 2019	—N/a	72.3	11.0; 1	53.5; 8	12.7; 1	–	2.8; 0	10.9; 1	4.1; 0	40.8
A+M/Heraldo de Aragón	12–13 Apr 2018	300	62.1	22.2; 3	27.7; 3/4	19.3; 2/3	13.2; 1	7.5; 1	6.9; 0/1	1.3; 0	5.5
2015 municipal election	24 May 2015	—N/a	67.5	28.2; 3	25.2; 3	23.6; 3	12.7; 1	8.4; 1	–	–	3.0

=== Calatayud ===
Polling firm/Commissioner	Fieldwork date	Sample size	Turnout	PP	PSOE	Cs	PAR	CHA	Podemos	CP	Vox	Lead
2019 municipal election	26 May 2019	—N/a	65.5	35.1; 9	27.7; 7	14.2; 3	7.0; 1	3.7; 0	4.6; 0	1.2; 0	5.5; 1	7.4
A+M/Heraldo de Aragón	6–11 May 2019	300	71.2	25.4; 6/7	22.8; 6/7	21.1; 4/5	10.4; 2	6.3; 1	5.4; 0/1	3.1; 0	3.9; 0	2.6
A+M/Heraldo de Aragón	12–13 Apr 2018	300	67.3	29.5; 7/8	19.3; 4/5	26.2; 6/7	11.8; 2/3	4.0; 0	6.7; 1	–	–	3.3
2015 municipal election	24 May 2015	—N/a	65.6	36.5; 9	21.2; 5	14.1; 3	11.9; 2	5.4; 1	5.4 (Note: Results for Aragón Sí Puede.); 1	3.0; 0	–	15.3

=== Cuarte de Huerva ===
Polling firm/Commissioner	Fieldwork date	Sample size	Turnout	PAR	PP	PSOE	CHA	Cs	Podemos	United Left of Aragon	Vox	Lead
2019 municipal election	26 May 2019	—N/a	64.8	32.3; 6	10.3; 2	19.8; 4	8.5; 1	12.8; 2	4.0; 0	2.2; 0	9.3; 2	12.5
A+M/Heraldo de Aragón	6–11 May 2019	300	68.8	37.1; 8	10.3; 2	13.7; 2	12.4; 2	10.1; 2	3.6; 0	3.2; 0	7.8; 1	23.4
A+M/Heraldo de Aragón	12–13 Apr 2018	300	69.9	37.1; 7/8	10.2; 2	17.1; 3/4	7.2; 1/2	16.3; 3	6.1; 1	4.1; 0	–	20.0
2015 municipal election	24 May 2015	—N/a	64.7	38.2; 8	12.4; 2	12.4; 2	10.0; 2	9.8; 2	7.6; 1	4.4; 0	–	25.8

=== Ejea de los Caballeros ===
Polling firm/Commissioner	Fieldwork date	Sample size	Turnout	PSOE	PP	EPC- ZGZ	CHA	PAR	Cs	United Left of Aragon	Podemos	Así Ejea	Lead
2019 municipal election	26 May 2019	—N/a	67.1	47.1; 10	17.7; 3	–	3.3; 0	2.5; 0	7.1; 1	7.4; 1	2.4; 0	11.5; 2	29.4
A+M/Heraldo de Aragón	6–11 May 2019	300	67.8	45.5; 9/10	20.5; 4/5	–	6.8; 1	2.8; 0	4.0; 0	8.2; 1	6.7; 0/1	4.6; 0	25.0
A+M/Heraldo de Aragón	12–13 Apr 2018	300	67.0	50.0; 10/11	17.6; 3	11.8; 2	5.9; 1	3.4; 0	8.9; 1/2	–	–	–	32.4
2015 municipal election	24 May 2015	—N/a	67.0	51.9; 10	21.6; 4	14.6; 2	6.3; 1	3.3; 0	–	–	–	–	30.3

=== Fraga ===
Polling firm/Commissioner	Fieldwork date	Sample size	Turnout	PSOE	PP	Cs	CxF	Podemos	PAR	United Left of Aragon	CHA	Lead
2019 municipal election	26 May 2019	—N/a	59.7	24.1; 4	40.1; 8	7.3; 1	12.3; 2	5.5; 1	5.0; 1	4.2; 0	–	16.0
A+M/Heraldo de Aragón	6–11 May 2019	300	68.7	32.6; 6/7	27.6; 5/6	14.4; 2	7.5; 1	5.4; 0/1	5.6; 0/1	5.1; 0/1	–	5.0
A+M/Heraldo de Aragón	12–13 Apr 2018	300	65.7	34.8; 7	24.3; 4/5	12.8; 2	8.6; 1/2	5.0; 0/1	5.4; 1	6.1; 1	–	10.5
2015 municipal election	24 May 2015	—N/a	61.1	33.2; 7	30.6; 6	7.8; 1	7.1; 1	6.7; 1	6.5; 1	4.5; 0	1.1; 0	2.6

=== Huesca ===
Color key:

Exit poll

Polling firm/Commissioner	Fieldwork date	Sample size	Turnout	PP	PSOE	CH	Cs	Podemos	PAR	CHA	Vox	Lead
2019 municipal election	26 May 2019	—N/a	63.6	29.8; 9	33.4; 10	4.5; 0	10.8; 3	8.5; 2	3.2; 0	3.2; 0	5.2; 1	3.6
GfK/FORTA	26 May 2019	?	?	21.3; 6/7	36.7; 10/12	6.7; 1/2	10.4; 2/3	11.6; 3/4	–	4.1; 0/1	4.9; 0/1	15.4
A+M/Heraldo de Aragón	7–8 May 2019	600	68.9	24.4; 7/8	25.2; 7/8	10.2; 3/4	14.3; 3	10.1; 3	4.1; 0	5.1; 0/1	5.4; 1	0.8
A+M/Heraldo de Aragón	4–5 Oct 2018	600	64.4	26.6; 8/9	30.1; 9/10	10.1; 3	18.4; 5/6	4.4; 0/1	3.3; 0	4.1; 0	–	3.5
A+M/Heraldo de Aragón	11–15 Apr 2018	600	64.1	25.2; 7/8	30.8; 8/9	10.9; 3	16.1; 4/5	6.9; 2	3.9; 0	3.7; 0	–	5.6
A+M/Heraldo de Aragón	22–27 Nov 2017	600	68.6	27.9; 9/10	30.5; 10/11	8.9; 2/3	12.7; 3/4	5.4; 1/2	–	–	–	2.6
2015 municipal election	24 May 2015	—N/a	63.8	30.9; 9	24.9; 8	13.6; 4	9.1; 2	8.7; 2	4.3; 0	4.2; 0	–	6.0

=== Jaca ===
Polling firm/Commissioner	Fieldwork date	Sample size	Turnout	PSOE	PP	PAR	CHA	CJ	Podemos	Cs	Vox	Lead
2019 municipal election	26 May 2019	—N/a	62.7	32.7; 6	17.4; 3	17.0; 3	13.9; 2	–	6.1; 1	5.7; 1	5.9; 1	15.3
A+M/Heraldo de Aragón	6–11 May 2019	300	69.3	33.0; 6/7	13.0; 2/3	10.3; 2	9.4; 1	–	11.1; 2	13.0; 2	6.4; 0/1	20.0
A+M/Heraldo de Aragón	12–13 Apr 2018	300	61.6	30.2; 5/6	22.7; 4	9.7; 1/2	9.3; 1/2	11.0; 2	4.3; 0	10.4; 2	–	7.5
2015 municipal election	24 May 2015	—N/a	64.6	32.6; 6	23.9; 5	11.0; 2	10.7; 2	9.5; 1	5.4; 1	4.7; 0	–	8.7

=== Monzón ===
Polling firm/Commissioner	Fieldwork date	Sample size	Turnout	PSOE	PP	CM	PAR	Cs	CHA	Podemos	Vox	Lead
2019 municipal election	26 May 2019	—N/a	65.4	33.1; 6	23.8; 5	9.9; 2	16.3; 3	6.1; 1	2.6; 0	3.0; 0	4.4; 0	9.3
A+M/Heraldo de Aragón	6–11 May 2019	300	69.6	30.1; 6	17.0; 3/4	9.7; 2	13.0; 2	15.3; 3	3.3; 0	6.8; 0/1	3.8; 0	13.1
2015 municipal election	24 May 2015	—N/a	64.6	28.8; 6	25.1; 5	16.1; 3	14.3; 2	6.8; 1	4.1; 0	–	–	3.7

=== Sabiñánigo ===
Polling firm/Commissioner	Fieldwork date	Sample size	Turnout	PSOE	PAR	CS	PP	CHA	Cs	Podemos	Lead
2019 municipal election	26 May 2019	—N/a	61.3	43.9; 7	13.7; 2	11.1; 1	14.9; 2	4.2; 0	6.6; 1	4.5; 0	29.0
A+M/Heraldo de Aragón	12–13 Apr 2018	300	67.9	31.7; 5	24.5; 4	14.0; 2	8.6; 1	4.2; 0	7.9; 1	1.7; 0	7.2
2015 municipal election	24 May 2015	—N/a	65.1	35.7; 6	27.8; 4	16.3; 2	11.3; 1	4.9; 0	1.9; 0	–	7.9

=== Tarazona ===
Polling firm/Commissioner	Fieldwork date	Sample size	Turnout	PP	TP	PSOE	Cs	PAR	Podemos	Vox	Lead
2019 municipal election	26 May 2019	—N/a	70.0	41.3; 8	9.1; 1	32.9; 7	5.1; 1	3.7; 0	4.8; 0	2.1; 0	8.4
A+M/Heraldo de Aragón	6–11 May 2019	300	72.0	47.8; 9/10	2.6; 0	17.0; 3/4	8.1; 1	4.0; 0	16.9; 3/4	1.8; 0	30.8
A+M/Heraldo de Aragón	12–13 Apr 2018	300	70.8	44.2; 8/9	17.1; 3	18.9; 3/4	15.1; 3	1.8; 0	–	–	25.3
2015 municipal election	24 May 2015	—N/a	71.1	54.1; 10	19.0; 3	17.6; 3	6.4; 1	1.3; 0	–	–	35.1

=== Teruel ===
Color key:

Exit poll

Polling firm/Commissioner	Fieldwork date	Sample size	Turnout	PP	PSOE	GT	PAR	Cs	CHA	Podemos	Vox	Lead
2019 municipal election	26 May 2019	—N/a	64.4	30.7; 7	23.1; 5	5.4; 1	9.5; 2	14.0; 3	5.4; 1	5.1; 1	5.5; 1	7.6
GfK/FORTA	26 May 2019	?	?	23.2; 5/6	29.2; 6/7	5.7; 0/1	8.3; 1/2	14.9; 3/4	5.2; 0/1	6.0; 1/2	5.2; 0/1	6.0
A+M/Heraldo de Aragón	14–15 May 2019	600	69.5	26.5; 7/8	20.9; 5/6	6.5; 1	9.6; 2	18.5; 4/5	7.4; 1	4.3; 0	5.2; 0/1	5.6
A+M/Heraldo de Aragón	4–5 Oct 2018	600	62.9	30.2; 7/8	24.7; 5/6	9.1; 2	8.3; 2	17.4; 4	6.4; 1	–	–	5.5
A+M/Heraldo de Aragón	11–15 Apr 2018	600	61.7	34.8; 8/9	15.7; 3/4	8.1; 1/2	9.2; 2	17.2; 4	8.4; 2	4.3; 0	–	17.6
A+M/Heraldo de Aragón	22–27 Nov 2017	600	70.0	30.8; 8/9	23.4; 6/7	10.3; 2	9.5; 2	12.4; 2/3	6.5; 1	–	–	7.4
2015 municipal election	24 May 2015	—N/a	63.9	32.2; 8	19.8; 5	15.0; 3	10.1; 2	9.5; 2	7.5; 1	–	–	12.4

=== Utebo ===
Polling firm/Commissioner	Fieldwork date	Sample size	Turnout	PSOE	PP	United Left of Aragon	Cs	CHA	Podemos	PAR	Vox	FIA	Lead
2019 municipal election	26 May 2019	—N/a	59.4	33.2; 7	16.5; 3	10.3; 2	13.8; 3	2.6; 0	4.7; 0	4.1; 0	5.8; 1	8.2; 1	16.7
A+M/Heraldo de Aragón	6–11 May 2019	300	70.9	32.8; 6/7	11.5; 2/3	5.5; 0/1	20.2; 3/4	5.6; 0/1	8.5; 1	3.0; 0	8.6; 1	–	12.6
A+M/Heraldo de Aragón	12–13 Apr 2018	300	66.7	29.8; 6	20.4; 3	13.4; 3	23.6; 4/5	4.7; 0/1	1.2; 0	–	–	–	6.2
2015 municipal election	24 May 2015	—N/a	61.8	30.9; 6	24.1; 5	16.3; 3	12.8; 2	5.9; 1	0.0; 0	–	–	–	6.8
