= 2019 Spanish local elections in Asturias =

This article presents the results breakdown of the local elections held in Asturias on 26 May 2019. The following tables show detailed results in the autonomous community's most populous municipalities, sorted alphabetically.

== City control ==
The following table lists party control in the most populous municipalities, including provincial capitals (shown in bold). Gains for a party are displayed with the cell's background shaded in that party's colour.

Municipality	Population	Previous control	New control
Avilés	78,715	Spanish Socialist Workers' Party (PSOE)	Spanish Socialist Workers' Party (PSOE)
Castrillón	22,376	United Left of Asturias (IU/IX)	United Left–Asturian Left (IU–IAS)
Gijón	271,843	Forum of Citizens (FAC)	Spanish Socialist Workers' Party (PSOE)
Langreo	39,984	United Left of Asturias (IU/IX)	Spanish Socialist Workers' Party (PSOE)
Mieres	38,428	United Left of Asturias (IU/IX)	United Left–Asturian Left (IU–IAS)
**Oviedo**	220,020	Spanish Socialist Workers' Party (PSOE)	People's Party (PP)
San Martín del Rey Aurelio	16,283	Spanish Socialist Workers' Party (PSOE)	Spanish Socialist Workers' Party (PSOE)
Siero	51,662	Spanish Socialist Workers' Party (PSOE)	Spanish Socialist Workers' Party (PSOE)

== Municipalities ==
=== Avilés ===
Population: 78,715

← Summary of the 26 May 2019 City Council of Avilés election results →
Parties and alliances	Popular vote			Seats	
Parties and alliances	Votes	%	±pp	Total	+/−
Spanish Socialist Workers' Party (PSOE)	13,949	36.43	+9.73	10	+2
Change Avilés (Podemos–IU–CxAsturies)^{1}	7,608	19.87	−10.05	5	−3
People's Party (PP)	5,621	14.68	−7.19	4	−2
Citizens–Party of the Citizenry (Cs)	5,123	13.38	+5.67	4	+2
Vox (Vox)	2,858	7.46	New	2	+2
Let's Win Avilés in Common (GAC)	1,098	2.87	−2.55	0	−1
Forum of Citizens (FAC)	651	1.70	−3.18	0	±0
Union of Independent Citizens (UCIN)	615	1.61	New	0	±0
Communist Party of the Workers of Spain (PCTE)	236	0.62	New	0	±0
Blank ballots	528	1.38	−0.75		
Total	38,287			25	±0
Valid votes	38,287	99.21	+0.51		
Invalid votes	304	0.79	−0.51		
Votes cast / turnout	38,591	58.83	−2.18		
Abstentions	27,012	41.17	+2.18		
Registered voters	65,603				
Sources
Footnotes: ^{1} Change Avilés results are compared to the combined totals of We Are Avilés and United Left of Asturias in the 2015 election.

=== Gijón ===
Population: 271,843

← Summary of the 26 May 2019 City Council of Gijón election results →
Parties and alliances	Popular vote			Seats	
Parties and alliances	Votes	%	±pp	Total	+/−
Spanish Socialist Workers' Party (PSOE)	46,465	34.21	+9.41	11	+4
Citizens–Party of the Citizenry (Cs)	18,189	13.39	+7.68	4	+3
Forum of Citizens (FAC)	16,803	12.37	−13.22	3	−5
We Can–Equo (Podemos–Equo)^{1}	16,161	11.90	−9.20	3	−3
People's Party (PP)	15,245	11.22	+0.47	3	±0
Vox (Vox)	9,517	7.01	New	2	+2
United Left–Asturian Left: Gijón for the Left (IU–IAS)	8,424	6.20	−1.95	1	−1
For Gijón (Por Gijón)	3,210	2.36	New	0	±0
Andecha Astur (Andecha)	295	0.22	−0.06	0	±0
Communist Party of the Workers of Spain (PCTE)	284	0.21	New	0	±0
Blank ballots	1,236	0.91	−0.51		
Total	135,829			27	±0
Valid votes	135,829	99.36	+0.26		
Invalid votes	877	0.64	−0.26		
Votes cast / turnout	136,706	60.56	−1.93		
Abstentions	89,015	39.44	+1.93		
Registered voters	225,721				
Sources
Footnotes: ^{1} We Can–Equo results are compared to Gijón Can totals in the 2015 election.

=== Langreo ===
Population: 39,984

← Summary of the 26 May 2019 City Council of Langreo election results →
Parties and alliances	Popular vote			Seats	
Parties and alliances	Votes	%	±pp	Total	+/−
Spanish Socialist Workers' Party (PSOE)	6,968	36.59	+8.34	9	+3
United for Langreo (IU–Podemos–Equo)^{1}	6,678	35.07	−10.50	8	−3
People's Party (PP)	2,314	12.15	−1.85	2	−1
Citizens–Party of the Citizenry (Cs)	1,877	9.86	+4.70	2	+1
Forum of Citizens (FAC)	504	2.65	−1.33	0	±0
Union of Independent Citizens (UCIN)	316	1.66	New	0	±0
Communist Party of the Workers of Spain (PCTE)	106	0.56	New	0	±0
Blank ballots	280	1.47	−1.03		
Total	19,043			21	±0
Valid votes	19,043	98.70	+0.90		
Invalid votes	251	1.30	−0.90		
Votes cast / turnout	19,294	56.89	+0.10		
Abstentions	14,620	43.11	−0.10		
Registered voters	33,914				
Sources
Footnotes: ^{1} United for Langreo results are compared to the combined totals of United Left of Asturias and We Are Langreo in the 2015 election.

=== Mieres ===
Population: 38,428

← Summary of the 26 May 2019 City Council of Mieres election results →
Parties and alliances	Popular vote			Seats	
Parties and alliances	Votes	%	±pp	Total	+/−
United Left–Asturian Left: Mieres by the Left (IU–IAS)	11,406	58.11	+9.05	15	+3
Spanish Socialist Workers' Party (PSOE)	3,560	18.14	−0.61	4	±0
People's Party (PP)	2,033	10.36	−2.70	2	−1
We Can (Podemos)^{1}	927	4.72	−7.13	0	−2
Citizens–Party of the Citizenry (Cs)	759	3.87	+0.91	0	±0
Vox (Vox)	489	2.49	New	0	±0
Forum of Citizens (FAC)	180	0.92	−1.10	0	±0
Communist Party of the Workers of Spain (PCTE)	74	0.38	New	0	±0
Imagine Mieres (IM)	0	0.00	New	0	±0
Blank ballots	200	1.02	−0.58		
Total	19,628			21	±0
Valid votes	19,628	99.11	+0.54		
Invalid votes	176	0.89	−0.54		
Votes cast / turnout	19,804	59.58	−0.17		
Abstentions	13,433	40.42	+0.17		
Registered voters	33,237				
Sources
Footnotes: ^{1} We Can results are compared to We Are Mieres totals in the 2015 election.

=== Oviedo ===
Population: 220,020

← Summary of the 26 May 2019 City Council of Oviedo election results →
Parties and alliances	Popular vote			Seats	
Parties and alliances	Votes	%	±pp	Total	+/−
People's Party (PP)	35,413	31.87	−2.52	9	−2
Spanish Socialist Workers' Party (PSOE)	29,385	26.44	+8.40	8	+3
Citizens–Party of the Citizenry (Cs)	17,934	16.14	+7.67	5	+3
We Are Oviedo–We Can Asturias (Somos Oviedo/Uviéu)	12,898	11.61	−7.43	3	−3
Vox (Vox)	7,690	6.92	+5.54	2	+2
United Left–Asturian Left: Oviedo by the Left (IU–IAS)	4,194	3.77	−5.46	0	−3
Forum of Citizens (FAC)	1,130	1.02	−2.86	0	±0
Animalist Party Against Mistreatment of Animals (PACMA)	820	0.74	New	0	±0
Let's Win (Ganemos)	234	0.21	New	0	±0
Andecha Astur (Andecha)	199	0.18	−0.04	0	±0
Communist Party of the Workers of Spain (PCTE)	163	0.15	New	0	±0
Blank ballots	1,071	0.96	−0.94		
Total	111,131			27	±0
Valid votes	111,131	99.43	+0.50		
Invalid votes	632	0.57	−0.50		
Votes cast / turnout	111,763	62.89	+2.55		
Abstentions	65,942	37.11	−2.55		
Registered voters	177,705				

=== San Martín del Rey Aurelio ===
Population: 16,283

← Summary of the 26 May 2019 City Council of San Martín del Rey Aurelio election results →
Parties and alliances	Popular vote			Seats	
Parties and alliances	Votes	%	±pp	Total	+/−
Spanish Socialist Workers' Party (PSOE)	3,487	41.24	+2.99	8	+1
United Left–Asturian Left: San Martín del Rey Aurelio by the Left (IU–IAS)	2,501	29.58	+4.69	5	±0
People's Party (PP)	1,033	12.22	−0.31	2	±0
Citizens–Party of the Citizenry (Cs)	648	7.66	New	1	+1
We Can (Podemos)^{1}	643	7.60	−11.84	1	−2
Blank ballots	143	1.69	−0.14		
Total	8,455			17	±0
Valid votes	8,455	97.70	−0.11		
Invalid votes	199	2.30	+0.11		
Votes cast / turnout	8,654	61.21	−0.91		
Abstentions	5,484	38.79	+0.91		
Registered voters	14,138				
Sources
Footnotes: ^{1} We Can results are compared to We Are San Martín del Rey Aurelio totals in the 2015 election.

=== Siero ===
Population: 51,662

← Summary of the 26 May 2019 City Council of Siero election results →
Parties and alliances	Popular vote			Seats	
Parties and alliances	Votes	%	±pp	Total	+/−
Spanish Socialist Workers' Party (PSOE)	10,097	39.81	+15.19	12	+5
People's Party (PP)	2,920	11.51	−0.99	3	±0
United Left–Asturian Left: Siero by the Left (IU–IAS)	2,378	9.37	−2.04	3	±0
Citizens–Party of the Citizenry (Cs)	2,191	8.64	+3.33	2	+1
We Are Siero (Somos Siero)	2,083	8.21	−6.46	2	−2
Vox (Vox)	1,568	6.18	+5.64	1	+1
Forum of Citizens (FAC)	1,455	5.74	−10.23	1	−4
La Fresneda Local Platform (PVF)	1,346	5.31	−0.40	1	±0
Independent Party of Siero (PINSI)	1,055	4.16	−1.14	0	−1
Blank ballots	273	1.08	−0.98		
Total	25,366			25	±0
Valid votes	25,366	99.19	+0.73		
Invalid votes	206	0.81	−0.73		
Votes cast / turnout	25,572	59.56	+0.36		
Abstentions	17,366	40.44	−0.36		
Registered voters	42,938				

== See also ==
- 2019 Asturian regional election
