= 2007 Canarian island council elections =

Elections in the Spanish region of the Canary Islands

Island council elections were held in the Canary Islands on 27 May 2007 to elect the 8th Island Councils (the cabildos insulares) of El Hierro, Fuerteventura, Gran Canaria, La Gomera, La Palma, Lanzarote and Tenerife. All 153 seats in the seven island councils were up for election. They were held concurrently with regional elections in thirteen autonomous communities (including the Canary Islands) and local elections all across Spain.

== Overall ==
← Summary of the 27 May 2007 Canarian island council election results →
Parties and alliances	Popular vote			Seats	
Parties and alliances	Votes	%	±pp	Total	+/−
Spanish Socialist Workers' Party (PSOE)	289,934	31.46	+5.91	55	+9
Canarian Coalition–Canarian Nationalist Party (CC–PNC)	231,852	25.16	−9.32	54	−3
Canarian Coalition–Canarian Nationalist Party (CC–PNC)	228,032	24.75	−8.29	46	−3
Independent Herrenian Group (AHI)	3,114	0.34	+0.03	7	±0
Canarian Nationalist Party (PNC)	706	0.08	−1.06	1	±0
People's Party (PP)	219,574	23.83	−6.09	31	−4
New Canaries (NCa)	56,964	6.18	New	6	+6
Canarian Centre (CCN)	47,523	5.16	+1.97	7	−3
Canarian Centre (CCN)^{2}	37,510	4.07	+2.37	1	−1
Lanzarote Independents Party (PIL)	10,013	1.09	−0.40	6	−2
The Greens (Verdes)	11,373	1.23	−1.16	0	±0
Canarian United Left (IUC)	10,085	1.09	−0.09	0	±0
Commitment to Gran Canaria (CGCa)	9,933	1.08	New	0	±0
Yes We Can for Tenerife Alternative (ASSPPT)^{3}	8,912	0.97	+0.53	0	±0
The Greens–Green Group (LV–GV)	5,933	0.64	New	0	±0
Canarian Nationalist Alternative (ANC)	2,542	0.28	New	0	±0
25 May Citizens' Alternative (AC25M)	1,869	0.20	−0.15	0	−1
Unity of the People (UP)	1,528	0.17	New	0	±0
United Neighbours (VU)	1,508	0.16	New	0	±0
Alternative Island (ISAL)	1,328	0.14	New	0	±0
Communist Party of the Canarian People (PCPC)	1,306	0.14	+0.02	0	±0
Party of Gran Canaria (PGC)	1,097	0.12	New	0	±0
Nationalist Maga Alternative (AMAGA)	1,066	0.12	New	0	±0
Centre Coalition (CCCAN)	1,043	0.11	New	0	±0
Humanist Party (PH)	762	0.08	−0.04	0	±0
Canarian Popular Alternative (APCa)^{4}	663	0.07	−0.07	0	±0
Commitment to Tenerife (CTF)	492	0.05	New	0	±0
Pensionist Assembly of the Canaries (TPC)	470	0.05	±0.00	0	±0
National Democracy (DN)	350	0.04	New	0	±0
Neighbourhood Party for Progress (PVPS)	257	0.03	New	0	±0
Blank ballots	13,151	1.43	+0.19		
Total	921,515			153	+4
Valid votes	921,515	99.37	−0.07		
Invalid votes	5,845	0.63	+0.07		
Votes cast / turnout	927,360	61.34	−2.26		
Abstentions	584,474	38.66	+2.26		
Registered voters	1,511,834				
Sources
Footnotes: ^{1} Canarian Coalition–Canarian Nationalist Party results are compared to Canarian Coalition totals in the 2003 elections.; ^{2} Canarian Centre results are compared to the combined totals of Canarian Union and Independents of Fuerteventura in the 2003 elections.; ^{3} Yes We Can for Tenerife Alternative results are compared to Canarian Popular Alternative totals in Tenerife in the 2003 elections.; ^{4} Canarian Popular Alternative results are compared to Canarian Popular Alternative totals in Gran Canaria in the 2003 elections.

Popular vote
PSOE	31.46%
CC–PNC	25.16%
PP	23.83%
NCa	6.18%
CCN	5.16%
Verdes	1.23%
IUC	1.09%
CGCa	1.08%
Others	3.38%
Blank ballots	1.43%

Seats
PSOE	35.95%
CC–PNC	35.29%
PP	20.26%
CCN	4.58%
NCa	3.92%

== Island control ==
The following table lists party control in the island councils. Gains for a party are highlighted in that party's colour.

Island	Population	Previous control	New control
El Hierro	10,688	Independent Herrenian Group (AHI)	Independent Herrenian Group (AHI)
Fuerteventura	89,680	Canarian Coalition–Canarian Nationalist Party (CC–PNC)	Canarian Coalition–Canarian Nationalist Party (CC–PNC)
Gran Canaria	807,049	People's Party (PP)	Spanish Socialist Workers' Party (PSOE)
La Gomera	21,952	Spanish Socialist Workers' Party (PSOE)	Spanish Socialist Workers' Party (PSOE)
La Palma	86,062	Canarian Coalition–Canarian Nationalist Party (CC–PNC)	Canarian Coalition–Canarian Nationalist Party (CC–PNC)
Lanzarote	127,457	Canarian Coalition–Canarian Nationalist Party (CC–PNC)	Spanish Socialist Workers' Party (PSOE) (CC in 2009)
Tenerife	852,945	Canarian Coalition–Canarian Nationalist Party (CC–PNC)	Canarian Coalition–Canarian Nationalist Party (CC–PNC)

== Islands ==
=== El Hierro ===
← Summary of the 27 May 2007 Island Council of El Hierro election results →
Parties and alliances	Popular vote			Seats	
Parties and alliances	Votes	%	±pp	Total	+/−
Canarian Coalition–Independent Herrenian Group (CC–AHI)	3,114	52.41	+2.29	7	±0
Spanish Socialist Workers' Party (PSOE)	1,179	19.84	−0.65	3	±0
People's Party (PP)	1,050	17.67	−1.56	2	±0
Canarian Nationalist Party (PNC)	391	6.58	−2.22	1	±0
Canarian Centre (CCN)	125	2.10	New	0	±0
Blank ballots	83	1.40	+0.04		
Total	5,942			13	±0
Valid votes	5,942	98.80	−0.97		
Invalid votes	72	1.20	+0.97		
Votes cast / turnout	6,014	64.22	+9.15		
Abstentions	3,350	35.78	−9.15		
Registered voters	9,364				

=== Fuerteventura ===
← Summary of the 27 May 2007 Island Council of Fuerteventura election results →
Parties and alliances	Popular vote			Seats	
Parties and alliances	Votes	%	±pp	Total	+/−
Canarian Coalition–Canarian Nationalist Party (CC–PNC)	13,539	40.35	+9.65	10	+3
Spanish Socialist Workers' Party (PSOE)	8,071	24.05	−3.20	6	±0
People's Party (PP)	7,898	23.54	−3.17	5	−1
Canarian Centre–Independents of Fuerteventura (CCN–IF)^{1}	1,454	4.33	−5.17	0	−2
The Greens of the Canaries (Verdes)	1,452	4.33	+1.35	0	±0
New Fuerteventura–New Canaries (NCa)	564	1.68	New	0	±0
Canarian United Left (IUC)	149	0.44	New	0	±0
Blank ballots	431	1.28	+0.26		
Total	33,558			21	±0
Valid votes	33,558	98.96	−0.24		
Invalid votes	351	1.04	+0.24		
Votes cast / turnout	33,909	61.80	−1.97		
Abstentions	20,959	38.20	+1.97		
Registered voters	54,868				
Sources
Footnotes: ^{1} Canarian Centre–Independents of Fuerteventura results are compared to Independents of Fuerteventura totals in the 2003 election.

=== Gran Canaria ===
← Summary of the 27 May 2007 Island Council of Gran Canaria election results →
Parties and alliances	Popular vote			Seats	
Parties and alliances	Votes	%	±pp	Total	+/−
People's Party (PP)	136,502	34.86	−13.22	12	−3
Spanish Socialist Workers' Party (PSOE)	132,767	33.91	+12.81	12	+5
New Canaries–New Gran Canaria (NCa)	51,906	13.26	New	4	+4
Canarian Coalition–Canarian Nationalist Party (CC–PNC)^{1}	20,234	5.17	−19.88	1	−6
Canarian Centre (CCN)	14,944	3.82	New	0	±0
Commitment to Gran Canaria (CGCa)	9,933	2.54	New	0	±0
The Greens of the Canaries (Verdes)	9,921	2.53	+0.35	0	±0
Canarian United Left (IUC)	2,399	0.61	−0.73	0	±0
Unity of the People (UP)	1,528	0.39	New	0	±0
United Neighbours (VU)	1,508	0.39	New	0	±0
Party of Gran Canaria (PGC)	1,097	0.28	New	0	±0
Nationalist Maga Alternative (AMAGA)	1,066	0.27	New	0	±0
Communist Party of the Canarian People (PCPC)	725	0.19	−0.07	0	±0
Canarian Popular Alternative (APCa)	663	0.17	−0.16	0	±0
Pensionist Assembly of the Canaries (TPC)	470	0.12	+0.01	0	±0
Humanist Party (PH)	346	0.09	−0.07	0	±0
Blank ballots	5,545	1.42	+0.14		
Total	391,554			29	±0
Valid votes	391,554	99.36	−0.05		
Invalid votes	2,516	0.64	+0.05		
Votes cast / turnout	394,070	63.16	−4.53		
Abstentions	229,876	36.84	+4.53		
Registered voters	623,946				
Sources
Footnotes: ^{1} Canarian Coalition–Canarian Nationalist Party results are compared to the combined totals of Canarian Coalition and Canarian Union in the 2003 election.

=== La Gomera ===
← Summary of the 27 May 2007 Island Council of La Gomera election results →
Parties and alliances	Popular vote			Seats	
Parties and alliances	Votes	%	±pp	Total	+/−
Spanish Socialist Workers' Party (PSOE)	8,973	66.83	+4.25	12	+3
Canarian Coalition–Canarian Nationalist Party (CC–PNC)^{1}	3,225	24.02	−8.19	4	±0
Canarian Centre (CCN)	729	5.43	New	1	+1
People's Party (PP)	332	2.47	−1.72	0	±0
Blank ballots	167	1.24	+0.22		
Total	13,426			17	+4
Valid votes	13,426	98.47	−0.75		
Invalid votes	208	1.53	+0.75		
Votes cast / turnout	13,634	62.52	+3.35		
Abstentions	8,175	37.48	−3.35		
Registered voters	21,809				
Sources
Footnotes: ^{1} Canarian Coalition–Canarian Nationalist Party results are compared to the combined totals of Canarian Coalition and Canarian Nationalist Party in the 2003 election.

=== La Palma ===
← Summary of the 27 May 2007 Island Council of La Palma election results →
Parties and alliances	Popular vote			Seats	
Parties and alliances	Votes	%	±pp	Total	+/−
Canarian Coalition–Canarian Nationalist Party (CC–PNC)	21,816	46.77	−2.55	11	±0
Spanish Socialist Workers' Party (PSOE)	12,706	27.24	+4.84	6	+1
People's Party (PP)	7,773	16.66	−4.80	4	−1
Canarian Centre (CCN)	2,030	4.35	New	0	±0
Initiative for La Palma–New Canaries (NCa)^{1}	1,474	3.16	−0.98	0	±0
Canarian United Left (IUC)	451	0.97	New	0	±0
Blank ballots	398	0.85	+0.07		
Total	46,648			21	±0
Valid votes	46,648	99.37	−0.15		
Invalid votes	295	0.63	+0.15		
Votes cast / turnout	46,943	62.01	+2.86		
Abstentions	28,758	37.99	−2.86		
Registered voters	75,701				
Sources
Footnotes: ^{1} Initiative for La Palma–New Canaries results are compared to Initiative for La Palma totals in the 2003 election.

=== Lanzarote ===
← Summary of the 27 May 2007 Island Council of Lanzarote election results →
Parties and alliances	Popular vote			Seats	
Parties and alliances	Votes	%	±pp	Total	+/−
Spanish Socialist Workers' Party (PSOE)	10,494	23.69	+1.03	6	±0
Lanzarote Independents Party (PIL)	10,013	22.60	−9.20	6	−2
Canarian Coalition (CC)	9,190	20.74	+2.16	6	+1
People's Party (PP)	5,399	12.19	−1.38	3	±0
Nationalist Party of Lanzarote–New Canaries (NCa)	3,020	6.82	New	2	+2
25 May Citizens' Alternative (AC25M)	1,869	4.22	−3.14	0	−1
Alternative Island (ISAL)	1,328	3.00	New	0	±0
Canarian Centre (CCN)	1,294	2.92	New	0	±0
Canarian Nationalist Party (PNC)	315	0.71	New	0	±0
Neighbourhood Party for Progress (PVPS)	257	0.58	New	0	±0
Blank ballots	1,125	2.54	+1.02		
Total	44,304			23	±0
Valid votes	44,304	99.33	−0.10		
Invalid votes	301	0.67	+0.10		
Votes cast / turnout	44,605	56.30	−1.78		
Abstentions	34,624	43.70	+1.78		
Registered voters	79,229				

=== Tenerife ===
← Summary of the 27 May 2007 Island Council of Tenerife election results →
Parties and alliances	Popular vote			Seats	
Parties and alliances	Votes	%	±pp	Total	+/−
Canarian Coalition–Canarian Nationalist Party (CC–PNC)^{1}	160,028	41.45	−6.76	14	−1
Spanish Socialist Workers' Party (PSOE)	115,744	29.98	+0.10	10	±0
People's Party (PP)	60,620	15.70	+1.46	5	+1
Canarian Centre (CCN)	16,934	4.39	New	0	±0
Yes We Can for Tenerife Alternative (ASSPPT)^{2}	8,912	2.31	+1.24	0	±0
The Greens–United Left–Citizens' Union–United for Tenerife (LV–IU–UC–UPT)^{3}	7,086	1.84	−2.53	0	±0
The Greens–Green Group (LV–GV)	5,933	1.54	New	0	±0
Canarian Nationalist Alternative (ANC)	2,542	0.66	New	0	±0
Centre Coalition (CCCAN)	1,043	0.27	New	0	±0
Communist Party of the Canarian People (PCPC)	581	0.15	New	0	±0
Commitment to Tenerife (CTF)	492	0.13	New	0	±0
Humanist Party (PH)	416	0.11	−0.01	0	±0
National Democracy (DN)	350	0.09	New	0	±0
Blank ballots	5,402	1.40	+0.15		
Total	386,083			29	±0
Valid votes	386,083	99.46	−0.04		
Invalid votes	2,102	0.54	+0.04		
Votes cast / turnout	388,185	60.01	−1.05		
Abstentions	258,732	39.99	+1.05		
Registered voters	646,917				
Sources
Footnotes: ^{1} Canarian Coalition–Canarian Nationalist Party results are compared to the combined totals of Canarian Coalition and Canarian Nationalist Party in the 2003 election.; ^{2} Yes We Can for Tenerife Alternative results are compared to Canarian Popular Alternative totals in the 2003 election.; ^{3} The Greens–United Left–Citizens' Union–United for Tenerife results are compared to the combined totals of The Greens of the Canaries and Canarian United Left in the 2003 election.
