= 2011 Canarian island council elections =

Elections in the Spanish region of the Canary Islands

Island council elections were held in the Canary Islands on 22 May 2011 to elect the 9th Island Councils (the cabildos insulares) of El Hierro, Fuerteventura, Gran Canaria, La Gomera, La Palma, Lanzarote and Tenerife. All 157 seats in the seven island councils were up for election. They were held concurrently with regional elections in thirteen autonomous communities (including the Canary Islands) and local elections all across Spain.

== Overall ==
← Summary of the 22 May 2011 Canarian island council election results →
Parties and alliances	Popular vote			Seats	
Parties and alliances	Votes	%	±pp	Total	+/−
People's Party (PP)	276,284	30.44	+6.61	47	+16
Canarian Coalition–Nationalist Party–Canarian Centre (CC–PNC–CCN)	231,804	25.54	−3.69	53	−2
Canarian Coalition–Nationalist Party–Canarian Centre (CC–PNC–CCN)^{1}	229,346	25.27	−3.55	47	±0
Independent Herrenian Group (AHI)	2,398	0.26	−0.08	6	−1
Canarian Nationalist Party (PNC)	60	0.01	−0.07	0	−1
Spanish Socialist Workers' Party (PSOE)	186,644	20.56	−10.90	43	−12
New Canaries (NCa)	62,430	6.88	+0.70	5	−1
Canarian United Left (IUC)	25,941	2.86	+1.34	0	±0
The Greens (Verdes)	19,992	2.20	+0.97	0	±0
Yes We Can Citizens' Alternative (ACSSP)^{2}	19,945	2.20	+1.16	0	±0
Union, Progress and Democracy (UPyD)	9,035	1.00	New	0	±0
Commitment to Gran Canaria (CGCa)	7,685	0.85	−0.23	0	±0
Canarian Nationalist Alternative (ANC)	6,945	0.77	+0.49	0	±0
Citizens for Canarian Change (CIUCA)	6,847	0.75	New	0	±0
Lanzarote Independents Party (PIL)	5,459	0.60	−0.49	3	−3
Common Sense in the Canaries (SCC)	5,191	0.57	New	0	±0
Majorero Progressive Party (PPMAJO)	4,687	0.52	New	3	+3
Municipal Assemblies of Fuerteventura (AMF)	2,494	0.27	New	2	+2
Independent Centre of the Canaries (CICAN)	2,354	0.26	New	0	±0
Communist Party of the Canarian People (PCPC)	2,329	0.26	+0.12	0	±0
25 May Citizens' Alternative (AC25M)	2,206	0.24	+0.04	1	+1
United Neighbours (VU)	1,382	0.15	−0.01	0	±0
Liberal Democratic Centre (CDL)	1,231	0.14	New	0	±0
Unity of the People (UP)	1,133	0.12	−0.05	0	±0
Humanist Party (PH)	876	0.10	+0.02	0	±0
Managers for Lanzarote (GPL)	590	0.06	New	0	±0
Canarian Social Democratic Centre (CSDC)	461	0.05	New	0	±0
National Democracy (DN)	416	0.05	New	0	±0
Canarian Patriotic Movement (MPC)	159	0.02	New	0	±0
HeroNeo Citizen Forum (FCHN)	80	0.01	New	0	±0
Blank ballots	23,127	2.55	+1.12		
Total	907,727			157	+4
Valid votes	907,727	97.38	−1.99		
Invalid votes	24,459	2.62	+1.99		
Votes cast / turnout	932,186	63.22	+1.88		
Abstentions	542,283	36.78	−1.88		
Registered voters	1,474,469				
Sources
Footnotes: ^{1} Canarian Coalition–Nationalist Party–Canarian Centre results are compared to the combined totals of Canarian Coalition–Canarian Nationalist Party and Canarian Centre in the 2007 elections.; ^{2} Yes We Can Citizens' Alternative results are compared to the combined totals of Yes We Can for Tenerife Alternative and Canarian Popular Alternative in the 2007 elections.

Popular vote
PP	30.44%
CC–PNC–CCN	25.54%
PSOE	20.56%
NCa	6.88%
IUC	2.86%
Verdes	2.20%
ACSSP	2.20%
UPyD	1.00%
PIL	0.60%
PPMAJO	0.52%
AMF	0.27%
AC25M	0.24%
Others	4.15%
Blank ballots	2.55%

Seats
CC–PNC–CCN	33.76%
PP	29.94%
PSOE	27.39%
NCa	3.18%
PIL	1.91%
PPMAJO	1.91%
AMF	1.27%
AC25M	0.64%

== Island control ==
The following table lists party control in the island councils. Gains for a party are highlighted in that party's colour.

Island	Population	Previous control	New control
El Hierro	10,960	Independent Herrenian Group (AHI)	Independent Herrenian Group (AHI) (PSOE in 2011)
Fuerteventura	103,492	Canarian Coalition–Canarian Nationalist Party (CC–PNC)	Canarian Coalition–Canarian Nationalist Party (CC–PNC)
Gran Canaria	845,676	Spanish Socialist Workers' Party (PSOE)	People's Party (PP)
La Gomera	22,776	Spanish Socialist Workers' Party (PSOE)	Spanish Socialist Workers' Party (PSOE) (ASG in 2015)
La Palma	87,324	Canarian Coalition–Canarian Nationalist Party (CC–PNC)	Canarian Coalition–Canarian Nationalist Party (CC–PNC) (PSOE in 2013)
Lanzarote	141,437	Canarian Coalition–Canarian Nationalist Party (CC–PNC)	Canarian Coalition–Canarian Nationalist Party (CC–PNC)
Tenerife	906,854	Canarian Coalition–Canarian Nationalist Party (CC–PNC)	Canarian Coalition–Canarian Nationalist Party (CC–PNC)

== Islands ==
=== El Hierro ===
← Summary of the 22 May 2011 Island Council of El Hierro election results →
Parties and alliances	Popular vote			Seats	
Parties and alliances	Votes	%	±pp	Total	+/−
Independent Herrenian Group–Canarian Coalition (AHI–CC)^{1}	2,398	39.43	−15.08	6	−1
Spanish Socialist Workers' Party (PSOE)	2,187	35.96	+16.12	5	+2
People's Party (PP)	1,194	19.63	+1.96	2	±0
El Hierro Initiative–Canarian United Left (IpH–IUC)	104	1.71	New	0	±0
HeroNeo Citizen Forum (FCHN)	80	1.32	New	0	±0
Canarian Nationalist Party (PNC)	60	0.99	−5.59	0	−1
Blank ballots	58	0.95	−0.45		
Total	6,081			13	±0
Valid votes	6,081	98.97	+0.17		
Invalid votes	63	1.03	−0.17		
Votes cast / turnout	6,144	75.68	+11.46		
Abstentions	1,974	24.32	−11.46		
Registered voters	8,118				
Sources
Footnotes: ^{1} Independent Herrenian Group–Canarian Coalition results are compared to the combined totals of and Independent Herrenian Group–Canarian Coalition and Canarian Centre in the 2011 election.

=== Fuerteventura ===
← Summary of the 22 May 2011 Island Council of Fuerteventura election results →
Parties and alliances	Popular vote			Seats	
Parties and alliances	Votes	%	±pp	Total	+/−
Canarian Coalition–Nationalist Party–Canarian Centre (CC–PNC–CCN)^{1}	12,209	36.00	−8.68	9	−1
People's Party (PP)	6,134	18.09	−5.45	5	±0
Spanish Socialist Workers' Party (PSOE)	5,046	14.88	−9.17	4	−2
Majorero Progressive Party (PPMAJO)	4,687	13.82	New	3	+3
Municipal Assemblies of Fuerteventura (AMF)	2,494	7.35	New	2	+2
New Fuerteventura–New Canaries (NCa)	1,216	3.59	+1.91	0	±0
The Greens (Verdes)	675	1.99	−2.34	0	±0
Canarian United Left (IUC)	353	1.04	+0.60	0	±0
Union, Progress and Democracy (UPyD)	314	0.93	New	0	±0
Blank ballots	788	2.32	+1.04		
Total	33,916			23	+2
Valid votes	33,916	97.04	−1.92		
Invalid votes	1,033	2.96	+1.92		
Votes cast / turnout	34,949	64.10	+2.30		
Abstentions	19,574	35.90	−2.30		
Registered voters	54,523				
Sources
Footnotes: ^{1} Canarian Coalition–Nationalist Party–Canarian Centre results are compared to the combined totals of Canarian Coalition–Canarian Nationalist Party and Canarian Centre–Independents of Fuerteventura in the 2007 election.

=== Gran Canaria ===
← Summary of the 22 May 2011 Island Council of Gran Canaria election results →
Parties and alliances	Popular vote			Seats	
Parties and alliances	Votes	%	±pp	Total	+/−
People's Party (PP)	146,498	38.78	+3.92	14	+2
Spanish Socialist Workers' Party (PSOE)	78,348	20.74	−13.17	7	−5
New Canaries–New Gran Canaria (NCa)	57,925	15.33	+2.07	5	+1
Canarian Coalition–Nationalist Party–Canarian Centre (CC–PNC–CCN)^{1}	34,912	9.24	+0.25	3	+2
The Greens (Verdes)	10,290	2.72	+0.19	0	±0
Commitment to Gran Canaria (CGCa)	7,685	2.03	−0.51	0	±0
Citizens for Canarian Change (CIUCA)	6,847	1.81	New	0	±0
Canarian United Left (IUC)	5,522	1.46	+0.85	0	±0
Common Sense in the Canaries (SCC)	5,191	1.37	New	0	±0
Union, Progress and Democracy (UPyD)	4,623	1.22	New	0	±0
Yes We Can Citizens' Alternative (ACSSP)^{2}	2,568	0.68	+0.51	0	±0
Canarian Nationalist Alternative (ANC)	1,630	0.43	New	0	±0
United Neighbours (VU)	1,382	0.37	−0.02	0	±0
Communist Party of the Canarian People (PCPC)	1,175	0.31	+0.12	0	±0
Unity of the People (UP)	1,133	0.30	−0.09	0	±0
Liberal Democratic Centre (CDL)	540	0.14	New	0	±0
National Democracy (DN)	416	0.11	New	0	±0
Blank ballots	11,085	2.93	+1.51		
Total	377,770			29	±0
Valid votes	377,770	96.86	−2.50		
Invalid votes	12,243	3.14	+2.50		
Votes cast / turnout	390,013	62.26	−0.90		
Abstentions	236,408	37.74	+0.90		
Registered voters	626,421				
Sources
Footnotes: ^{1} Canarian Coalition–Nationalist Party–Canarian Centre results are compared to the combined totals of Canarian Coalition–Canarian Nationalist Party and Canarian Centre in the 2007 election.; ^{2} Yes We Can Citizens' Alternative results are compared to Canarian Popular Alternative totals in the 2007 election.

=== La Gomera ===
← Summary of the 22 May 2011 Island Council of La Gomera election results →
Parties and alliances	Popular vote			Seats	
Parties and alliances	Votes	%	±pp	Total	+/−
Spanish Socialist Workers' Party (PSOE)	6,450	52.13	−14.70	10	−2
People's Party (PP)	3,282	26.53	+24.06	5	+5
Canarian Coalition–Nationalist Party–Canarian Centre (CC–PNC–CCN)^{1}	1,564	12.64	−16.81	2	−3
New Canaries (NCa)	514	4.15	New	0	±0
The Greens (Verdes)	431	3.48	New	0	±0
Blank ballots	132	1.07	−0.17		
Total	12,373			17	±0
Valid votes	12,373	98.31	−0.16		
Invalid votes	213	1.69	+0.16		
Votes cast / turnout	12,586	78.09	+15.57		
Abstentions	3,532	21.91	−15.57		
Registered voters	16,118				
Sources
Footnotes: ^{1} Canarian Coalition–Nationalist Party–Canarian Centre results are compared to the combined totals of Canarian Coalition–Canarian Nationalist Party and Canarian Centre in the 2007 election.

=== La Palma ===
← Summary of the 22 May 2011 Island Council of La Palma election results →
Parties and alliances	Popular vote			Seats	
Parties and alliances	Votes	%	±pp	Total	+/−
Canarian Coalition–Nationalist Party–Canarian Centre (CC–PNC–CCN)^{1}	17,761	39.65	−11.47	9	−2
People's Party (PP)	12,645	28.23	+11.57	6	+2
Spanish Socialist Workers' Party (PSOE)	10,967	24.48	−2.76	6	±0
New Canaries (NCa)	984	2.20	−0.96	0	±0
The Greens (Verdes)	853	1.90	New	0	±0
Canarian United Left (IUC)	651	1.45	+0.48	0	±0
Union, Progress and Democracy (UPyD)	323	0.72	New	0	±0
Blank ballots	612	1.37	+0.52		
Total	44,796			21	±0
Valid votes	44,796	98.05	−1.32		
Invalid votes	893	1.95	+1.32		
Votes cast / turnout	45,689	71.11	+9.10		
Abstentions	18,559	28.89	−9.10		
Registered voters	64,248				
Sources
Footnotes: ^{1} Canarian Coalition–Nationalist Party–Canarian Centre results are compared to the combined totals of Canarian Coalition–Canarian Nationalist Party and Canarian Centre in the 2007 election.

=== Lanzarote ===
← Summary of the 22 May 2011 Island Council of Lanzarote election results →
Parties and alliances	Popular vote			Seats	
Parties and alliances	Votes	%	±pp	Total	+/−
Canarian Coalition–Nationalist Party–Canarian Centre (CC–PNC–CCN)^{1}	13,418	31.26	+6.89	9	+3
People's Party (PP)	9,592	22.34	+10.15	6	+3
Spanish Socialist Workers' Party (PSOE)	6,726	15.67	−8.02	4	−2
Lanzarote Independents Party (PIL)	5,459	12.72	−9.88	3	−3
25 May Citizens' Alternative (AC25M)	2,206	5.14	+0.92	1	+1
Nationalist Party of Lanzarote–New Canaries–Option for Lanzarote (NCa)	1,791	4.17	−2.65	0	−2
Canarian United Left (IUC)	783	1.82	New	0	±0
Managers for Lanzarote (GPL)	590	1.37	New	0	±0
Union, Progress and Democracy (UPyD)	399	0.93	New	0	±0
Canarian Patriotic Movement (MPC)	159	0.37	New	0	±0
Blank ballots	1,804	4.20	+1.66		
Total	42,927			23	±0
Valid votes	42,927	96.43	−2.90		
Invalid votes	1,591	3.57	+2.90		
Votes cast / turnout	44,518	54.86	−1.44		
Abstentions	36,630	45.14	+1.44		
Registered voters	81,148				
Sources
Footnotes: ^{1} Canarian Coalition–Nationalist Party–Canarian Centre results are compared to the combined totals of Canarian Coalition, Canarian Centre and Canarian Nationalist Party in the 2007 election.

=== Tenerife ===
← Summary of the 22 May 2011 Island Council of Tenerife election results →
Parties and alliances	Popular vote			Seats	
Parties and alliances	Votes	%	±pp	Total	+/−
Canarian Coalition–Nationalist Party–Canarian Centre (CC–PNC–CCN)^{1}	149,482	38.34	−7.50	15	+1
People's Party (PP)	96,939	24.86	+9.16	9	+4
Spanish Socialist Workers' Party (PSOE)	76,920	19.73	−10.25	7	−3
United Left–The Greens–Socialists for Tenerife (IU–LV–SxTF)	18,528	4.75	+2.91	0	±0
Yes We Can for Tenerife Alternative (ASSPPT)	17,377	4.46	+2.15	0	±0
The Greens (Verdes)	7,743	1.99	New	0	±0
Canarian Nationalist Alternative (ANC)	5,315	1.36	+0.70	0	±0
Union, Progress and Democracy (UPyD)	3,376	0.87	New	0	±0
Independent Centre of the Canaries (CICAN)	2,354	0.60	New	0	±0
Communist Party of the Canarian People (PCPC)	1,154	0.30	+0.15	0	±0
Humanist Party (PH)	876	0.22	+0.11	0	±0
Liberal Democratic Centre (CDL)	691	0.18	New	0	±0
Canarian Social Democratic Centre (CSDC)	461	0.12	New	0	±0
Blank ballots	8,648	2.22	+0.82		
Total	389,864			31	+2
Valid votes	389,864	97.89	−1.57		
Invalid votes	8,423	2.11	+1.57		
Votes cast / turnout	398,287	63.84	+3.83		
Abstentions	225,606	36.16	−3.83		
Registered voters	623,893				
Sources
Footnotes: ^{1} Canarian Coalition–Nationalist Party–Canarian Centre results are compared to the combined totals of Canarian Coalition–Canarian Nationalist Party and Canarian Centre in the 2007 election.
