= 2003 Canarian island council elections =

Elections in the Spanish region of the Canary Islands

Island council elections were held in the Canary Islands on 25 May 2003 to elect the 7th Island Councils (the cabildos insulares) of El Hierro, Fuerteventura, Gran Canaria, La Gomera, La Palma, Lanzarote and Tenerife. All 149 seats in the seven island councils were up for election. They were held concurrently with regional elections in thirteen autonomous communities (including the Canary Islands) and local elections all across Spain.

== Overall ==
← Summary of the 25 May 2003 Canarian island council election results →
Parties and alliances	Popular vote			Seats	
Parties and alliances	Votes	%	±pp	Total	+/−
Canarian Coalition (CC)	305,410	33.34	−3.62	56	±0
Canarian Coalition (CC)	302,602	33.04	−3.61	49	±0
Independent Herrenian Group (AHI)	2,808	0.31	±0.00	7	±0
People's Party (PP)	274,064	29.92	+2.78	35	+4
Spanish Socialist Workers' Party (PSOE)	234,010	25.55	+2.13	46	+4
Canarian Nationalist Federation (FNC)	39,618	4.33	+0.76	11	+1
Lanzarote Independents Party (PIL)	13,655	1.49	+0.10	8	+1
Canarian Union (UC)	12,663	1.38	New	0	±0
Canarian Nationalist Party (PNC)	10,412	1.14	−0.53	1	+1
Independents of Fuerteventura (IF)	2,888	0.32	−0.19	2	−1
The Greens of the Canaries (Verdes)	21,875	2.39	+0.93	0	±0
Canarian United Left (IUC)	10,853	1.18	−1.75	0	±0
Canarian Popular Alternative (APCa)	5,330	0.58	New	0	±0
25 May Citizens' Alternative (AC25M)	3,161	0.35	New	1	+1
Reformist Canarian Centre (CCR)	1,976	0.22	New	0	±0
Initiative for La Palma (INPA)	1,881	0.21	New	0	±0
Humanist Party (PH)	1,108	0.12	−0.02	0	±0
Lanzarote Assembly–PdA–PCL (AC–PdA–PCL)	1,108	0.12	New	0	±0
Communist Party of the Canarian People (PCPC)	1,061	0.12	New	0	±0
Tenerife Union (UTI)	616	0.07	New	0	±0
Canarian Management Assembly (AGC)	590	0.06	New	0	±0
Majoreran People's Union (UPM)	558	0.06	New	0	±0
European Centrist Union (UCEEE)	521	0.06	New	0	±0
Pensionist Assembly of the Canaries (TPC)	431	0.05	−0.01	0	±0
Democratic Canarian Movement (MCD)	430	0.05	New	0	±0
Centrist Union (UNICE)	0	0.00	New	0	±0
Blank ballots	11,398	1.24	−0.14		
Total	915,999			149	+10
Valid votes	915,999	99.44	+0.03		
Invalid votes	5,123	0.56	−0.03		
Votes cast / turnout	921,122	63.60	+1.24		
Abstentions	527,254	36.40	−1.24		
Registered voters	1,448,376				

Popular vote
CC	33.34%
PP	29.92%
PSOE	25.55%
FNC	4.33%
Verdes	2.39%
IUC	1.18%
AC25M	0.35%
Others	1.70%
Blank ballots	1.24%

Seats
CC	37.58%
PSOE	30.87%
PP	23.49%
FNC	7.38%
AC25M	0.67%

== Island control ==
The following table lists party control in the island councils. Gains for a party are highlighted in that party's colour.

Island	Population	Previous control	New control
El Hierro	10,002	Independent Herrenian Group (AHI)	Independent Herrenian Group (AHI)
Fuerteventura	69,762	Canarian Coalition (CC)	Canarian Coalition (CC)
Gran Canaria	771,333	People's Party (PP)	People's Party (PP)
La Gomera	19,098	Spanish Socialist Workers' Party (PSOE)	Spanish Socialist Workers' Party (PSOE)
La Palma	85,547	Canarian Coalition (CC)	Canarian Coalition (CC)
Lanzarote	109,942	Spanish Socialist Workers' Party (PSOE)	Lanzarote Independents Party (PIL) (PP in 2005; CC in 2005)
Tenerife	778,071	Canarian Coalition (CC)	Canarian Coalition (CC)

== Islands ==
=== El Hierro ===
← Summary of the 25 May 2003 Island Council of El Hierro election results →
Parties and alliances	Popular vote			Seats	
Parties and alliances	Votes	%	±pp	Total	+/−
Canarian Coalition–Independent Herrenian Group (CC–AHI)	2,808	50.12	−8.05	7	±0
Spanish Socialist Workers' Party (PSOE)	1,148	20.49	−0.99	3	+1
People's Party (PP)	1,077	19.23	+1.84	2	±0
Canarian Nationalist Party (PNC)	493	8.80	New	1	+1
Blank ballots	76	1.36	−0.14		
Total	5,602			13	+2
Valid votes	5,602	99.77	+0.22		
Invalid votes	13	0.23	−0.22		
Votes cast / turnout	5,615	55.07	−10.11		
Abstentions	4,582	44.93	+10.11		
Registered voters	10,197				

=== Fuerteventura ===
← Summary of the 25 May 2003 Island Council of Fuerteventura election results →
Parties and alliances	Popular vote			Seats	
Parties and alliances	Votes	%	±pp	Total	+/−
Canarian Coalition (CC)	9,335	30.70	−4.94	7	+1
Spanish Socialist Workers' Party (PSOE)	8,287	27.25	+0.17	6	+1
People's Party (PP)	8,123	26.71	+10.35	6	+3
Independents of Fuerteventura (IF)	2,888	9.50	−6.87	2	−1
The Greens of the Canaries (Verdes)	906	2.98	New	0	±0
Majoreran People's Union (UPM)	558	1.84	New	0	±0
Blank ballots	310	1.02	−0.10		
Total	30,407			21	+4
Valid votes	30,407	99.20	−0.15		
Invalid votes	244	0.80	+0.15		
Votes cast / turnout	30,651	63.77	+0.56		
Abstentions	17,412	36.23	−0.56		
Registered voters	48,063				

=== Gran Canaria ===
← Summary of the 25 May 2003 Island Council of Gran Canaria election results →
Parties and alliances	Popular vote			Seats	
Parties and alliances	Votes	%	±pp	Total	+/−
People's Party (PP)	195,716	48.08	+6.11	15	+1
Canarian Coalition (CC)	89,318	21.94	−8.09	7	−3
Spanish Socialist Workers' Party (PSOE)	85,878	21.10	+4.60	7	+2
Canarian Union (UC)	12,663	3.11	New	0	±0
The Greens of the Canaries (Verdes)	8,864	2.18	+0.80	0	±0
Canarian United Left (IUC)	5,439	1.34	−1.13	0	±0
Canarian Popular Alternative (APCa)	1,325	0.33	New	0	±0
Communist Party of the Canarian People (PCPC)	1,061	0.26	New	0	±0
Humanist Party (PH)	647	0.16	±0.00	0	±0
European Centrist Union (UCEEE)	521	0.13	New	0	±0
Pensionist Assembly of the Canaries (TPC)	431	0.11	−0.02	0	±0
Centrist Union (UNICE)	0	0.00	New	0	±0
Blank ballots	5,229	1.28	+0.08		
Total	407,092			29	±0
Valid votes	407,092	99.41	±0.00		
Invalid votes	2,431	0.59	±0.00		
Votes cast / turnout	409,523	67.69	+5.00		
Abstentions	195,452	32.31	−5.00		
Registered voters	604,975				

=== La Gomera ===
← Summary of the 25 May 2003 Island Council of La Gomera election results →
Parties and alliances	Popular vote			Seats	
Parties and alliances	Votes	%	±pp	Total	+/−
Spanish Socialist Workers' Party (PSOE)	7,442	62.58	+2.60	9	±0
Canarian Coalition (CC)	3,651	30.70	+4.45	4	+1
People's Party (PP)	498	4.19	−2.91	0	−1
Canarian Nationalist Party (PNC)	180	1.51	New	0	±0
Blank ballots	121	1.02	+0.37		
Total	11,892			13	±0
Valid votes	11,892	98.22	−0.10		
Invalid votes	93	0.78	+0.10		
Votes cast / turnout	11,985	59.17	−13.48		
Abstentions	8,269	40.83	+13.48		
Registered voters	20,254				

=== La Palma ===
← Summary of the 25 May 2003 Island Council of La Palma election results →
Parties and alliances	Popular vote			Seats	
Parties and alliances	Votes	%	±pp	Total	+/−
Canarian Coalition (CC)	22,432	49.32	+2.87	11	+1
Spanish Socialist Workers' Party (PSOE)	10,188	22.40	−9.37	5	−2
People's Party (PP)	9,763	21.46	+4.41	5	+1
Initiative for La Palma (INPA)	1,881	4.14	New	0	±0
The Greens of the Canaries (Verdes)	868	1.91	+0.11	0	±0
Blank ballots	353	0.78	−0.03		
Total	45,485			21	±0
Valid votes	45,485	99.52	+0.15		
Invalid votes	218	0.48	−0.15		
Votes cast / turnout	45,703	59.15	−10.76		
Abstentions	31,559	40.85	+10.76		
Registered voters	77,262				

=== Lanzarote ===
← Summary of the 25 May 2003 Island Council of Lanzarote election results →
Parties and alliances	Popular vote			Seats	
Parties and alliances	Votes	%	±pp	Total	+/−
Lanzarote Independents Party (PIL)	13,655	31.80	+0.95	8	+1
Spanish Socialist Workers' Party (PSOE)	9,731	22.66	−3.81	6	±0
Canarian Coalition (CC)	7,979	18.58	−6.90	5	−1
People's Party (PP)	5,827	13.57	+3.37	3	+1
25 May Citizens' Alternative (AC25M)	3,161	7.36	New	1	+1
Lanzarote Assembly–PdA–PCL (AC–PdA–PCL)	1,108	2.58	New	0	±0
Democratic Canarian Movement (MCD)	430	1.00	New	0	±0
Canarian United Left (IUC)	398	0.93	−1.84	0	±0
Blank ballots	651	1.52	−0.55		
Total	42,940			23	+2
Valid votes	42,940	99.43	−0.01		
Invalid votes	244	0.57	+0.01		
Votes cast / turnout	43,184	58.08	+3.28		
Abstentions	31,175	41.92	−3.28		
Registered voters	74,359				

=== Tenerife ===
← Summary of the 25 May 2003 Island Council of Tenerife election results →
Parties and alliances	Popular vote			Seats	
Parties and alliances	Votes	%	±pp	Total	+/−
Canarian Coalition (CC)	169,887	45.60	+0.85	15	+1
Spanish Socialist Workers' Party (PSOE)	111,336	29.88	+1.70	10	+2
People's Party (PP)	53,060	14.24	−1.42	4	−1
The Greens of the Canaries (Verdes)	11,237	3.02	+1.18	0	±0
Canarian Nationalist Party (PNC)	9,739	2.61	−0.48	0	±0
Canarian United Left (IUC)	5,016	1.35	−2.30	0	±0
Canarian Popular Alternative (APCa)	4,005	1.07	New	0	±0
Reformist Canarian Centre (CCR)	1,976	0.53	New	0	±0
Tenerife Union (UTI)	616	0.17	New	0	±0
Canarian Management Assembly (AGC)	590	0.16	New	0	±0
Humanist Party (PH)	461	0.12	−0.05	0	±0
Blank ballots	4,658	1.25	−0.36		
Total	372,581			29	+2
Valid votes	372,581	99.50	+0.09		
Invalid votes	1,880	0.50	−0.09		
Votes cast / turnout	374,461	61.06	−0.63		
Abstentions	238,805	38.94	+0.63		
Registered voters	613,266				
