= 1999 Canarian island council elections =

Elections in the Spanish region of the Canary Islands

Island council elections were held in the Canary Islands on 13 June 1999 to elect the 6th Island Councils (the cabildos insulares) of El Hierro, Fuerteventura, Gran Canaria, La Gomera, La Palma, Lanzarote and Tenerife. All 139 seats in the seven island councils were up for election. They were held concurrently with regional elections in thirteen autonomous communities (including the Canary Islands) and local elections all across Spain.

== Overall ==
← Summary of the 13 June 1999 Canarian island council election results →
| Parties and alliances | Popular vote | | | Seats | |
| Parties and alliances | Votes | % | ±pp | Total | +/− |
|---|---|---|---|---|---|
| Canarian Coalition (CC) | 302,500 | 36.65 | +3.50 | 49 | +7 |
| People's Party (PP) | 223,961 | 27.14 | −2.61 | 31 | −3 |
| Spanish Socialist Workers' Party (PSOE) | 193,310 | 23.42 | −0.24 | 42 | −1 |
| Canarian Nationalist Federation (FNC) | 29,446 | 3.57 | +1.68 | 10 | −2 |
| Canarian Nationalist Party (PNC) | 13,767 | 1.67 | New | 0 | ±0 |
| Lanzarote Independents Party (PIL) | 11,438 | 1.39 | +0.06 | 7 | −1 |
| Independents of Fuerteventura (IF) | 4,241 | 0.51 | −0.05 | 3 | −1 |
| Canarian United Left (IUC) | 24,219 | 2.93 | −1.86 | 0 | −2 |
| Party of Gran Canaria (PGC) | 14,482 | 1.75 | −0.16 | 0 | ±0 |
| The Greens of the Canaries (Verdes) | 12,020 | 1.46 | New | 0 | ±0 |
| Centrist Union–Democratic and Social Centre (UC–CDS) | 4,272 | 0.52 | −0.15 | 0 | ±0 |
| Independent Herrenian Group (AHI) | 2,562 | 0.31 | +0.01 | 7 | +1 |
| Popular Democracy (PD) | 1,478 | 0.18 | New | 0 | ±0 |
| The Blue Seagull (LAGA) | 1,335 | 0.16 | New | 0 | ±0 |
| Humanist Party (PH) | 1,140 | 0.14 | −0.02 | 0 | ±0 |
| Canarian Alternative–Independent Citizens of the Canaries (AC–CICA) | 776 | 0.09 | New | 0 | ±0 |
| Nationalist Maga Alternative (AMAGA) | 654 | 0.08 | New | 0 | ±0 |
| Independent People's Group of Lanzarote (APIL) | 635 | 0.08 | New | 0 | ±0 |
| Fuerteventura Popular Platform (PPF) | 558 | 0.07 | New | 0 | ±0 |
| Pensionist Assembly of the Canaries (TPC) | 475 | 0.06 | New | 0 | ±0 |
| Gomera Group of Independents (AGI) | 88 | 0.01 | New | 0 | ±0 |
| Blank ballots | 11,378 | 1.38 | +0.33 | | |
| Total | 825,289 | | | 139 | ±0 |
| Valid votes | 825,289 | 99.41 | ±0.00 | | |
| Invalid votes | 4,909 | 0.59 | ±0.00 | | |
| Votes cast / turnout | 830,198 | 62.36 | −2.62 | | |
| Abstentions | 501,192 | 37.64 | +2.62 | | |
| Registered voters | 1,331,390 | | | | |

Popular vote
| CC | 36.65% |
| PP | 27.14% |
| PSOE | 23.42% |
| FNC | 3.57% |
| IUC | 2.93% |
| PGC | 1.75% |
| Verdes | 1.46% |
| AHI | 0.31% |
| Others | 1.38% |
| Blank ballots | 1.38% |

Seats
| CC | 35.25% |
| PSOE | 30.22% |
| PP | 22.30% |
| FNC | 7.19% |
| AHI | 5.04% |

== Island control ==
The following table lists party control in the island councils. Gains for a party are highlighted in that party's colour.

| Island | Population | Previous control | New control |
|---|---|---|---|
| El Hierro | 7,679 | Independent Herrenian Group (AHI) | Independent Herrenian Group (AHI) |
| Fuerteventura | 49,020 | Independents of Fuerteventura (IF) | Canarian Coalition (CC) |
| Gran Canaria | 715,994 | People's Party (PP) | People's Party (PP) |
| La Gomera | 16,790 | Spanish Socialist Workers' Party (PSOE) | Spanish Socialist Workers' Party (PSOE) |
| La Palma | 78,198 | Canarian Coalition (CC) | Canarian Coalition (CC) |
| Lanzarote | 84,849 | Spanish Socialist Workers' Party (PSOE) | Spanish Socialist Workers' Party (PSOE) |
| Tenerife | 677,485 | Canarian Coalition (CC) | Canarian Coalition (CC) |

== Islands ==
=== El Hierro ===
← Summary of the 13 June 1999 Island Council of El Hierro election results →
| Parties and alliances | Popular vote | | | Seats | |
| Parties and alliances | Votes | % | ±pp | Total | +/− |
|---|---|---|---|---|---|
| Independent Herrenian Group (AHI) | 2,562 | 58.17 | +8.86 | 7 | +1 |
| Spanish Socialist Workers' Party (PSOE) | 946 | 21.48 | −2.41 | 2 | −1 |
| People's Party (PP) | 766 | 17.39 | −1.86 | 2 | ±0 |
| Canarian United Left (IUC) | 45 | 1.02 | +0.16 | 0 | ±0 |
| Centrist Union–Democratic and Social Centre (UC–CDS) | 19 | 0.43 | +0.24 | 0 | ±0 |
| Blank ballots | 66 | 1.50 | +1.03 | | |
| Total | 4,404 | | | 11 | ±0 |
| Valid votes | 4,404 | 99.55 | −0.16 | | |
| Invalid votes | 20 | 0.45 | +0.16 | | |
| Votes cast / turnout | 4,424 | 65.18 | −16.57 | | |
| Abstentions | 2,363 | 34.82 | +16.57 | | |
| Registered voters | 6,787 | | | | |

=== Fuerteventura ===
← Summary of the 13 June 1999 Island Council of Fuerteventura election results →
| Parties and alliances | Popular vote | | | Seats | |
| Parties and alliances | Votes | % | ±pp | Total | +/− |
|---|---|---|---|---|---|
| Canarian Coalition (CC) | 9,233 | 35.64 | +1.20 | 6 | ±0 |
| Spanish Socialist Workers' Party (PSOE) | 7,014 | 27.08 | +6.96 | 5 | +2 |
| Independents of Fuerteventura (IF) | 4,241 | 16.37 | −5.45 | 3 | −1 |
| People's Party (PP) | 4,238 | 16.36 | −3.81 | 3 | −1 |
| Fuerteventura Popular Platform (PPF) | 558 | 2.15 | New | 0 | ±0 |
| Canarian United Left (IUC) | 328 | 1.27 | −0.96 | 0 | ±0 |
| Blank ballots | 291 | 1.12 | +0.30 | | |
| Total | 25,903 | | | 17 | ±0 |
| Valid votes | 25,903 | 99.35 | −0.03 | | |
| Invalid votes | 170 | 0.65 | +0.03 | | |
| Votes cast / turnout | 26,073 | 63.21 | −5.90 | | |
| Abstentions | 15,177 | 36.79 | +5.90 | | |
| Registered voters | 41,250 | | | | |

=== Gran Canaria ===
← Summary of the 13 June 1999 Island Council of Gran Canaria election results →
| Parties and alliances | Popular vote | | | Seats | |
| Parties and alliances | Votes | % | ±pp | Total | +/− |
|---|---|---|---|---|---|
| People's Party (PP) | 154,378 | 41.97 | +2.14 | 14 | ±0 |
| Canarian Coalition (CC) | 110,466 | 30.03 | +2.64 | 10 | +1 |
| Spanish Socialist Workers' Party (PSOE) | 60,688 | 16.50 | −2.03 | 5 | −1 |
| Party of Gran Canaria (PGC) | 14,482 | 3.94 | −0.27 | 0 | ±0 |
| Canarian United Left (IUC) | 9,077 | 2.47 | −2.34 | 0 | ±0 |
| The Greens of the Canaries (Verdes) | 5,059 | 1.38 | New | 0 | ±0 |
| Canarian Nationalist Party (PNC) | 3,388 | 0.92 | New | 0 | ±0 |
| Popular Democracy (PD) | 1,478 | 0.40 | New | 0 | ±0 |
| Centrist Union–Democratic and Social Centre (UC–CDS) | 1,352 | 0.37 | −0.06 | 0 | ±0 |
| The Blue Seagull (LAGA) | 1,335 | 0.36 | New | 0 | ±0 |
| Nationalist Maga Alternative (AMAGA) | 654 | 0.18 | New | 0 | ±0 |
| Humanist Party (PH) | 578 | 0.16 | −0.06 | 0 | ±0 |
| Pensionist Assembly of the Canaries (TPC) | 475 | 0.13 | New | 0 | ±0 |
| Blank ballots | 4,410 | 1.20 | +0.17 | | |
| Total | 367,820 | | | 29 | ±0 |
| Valid votes | 367,820 | 99.41 | ±0.00 | | |
| Invalid votes | 2,166 | 0.59 | ±0.00 | | |
| Votes cast / turnout | 369,986 | 62.69 | +3.96 | | |
| Abstentions | 220,152 | 37.31 | −3.96 | | |
| Registered voters | 590,138 | | | | |

=== La Gomera ===
← Summary of the 13 June 1999 Island Council of La Gomera election results →
| Parties and alliances | Popular vote | | | Seats | |
| Parties and alliances | Votes | % | ±pp | Total | +/− |
|---|---|---|---|---|---|
| Spanish Socialist Workers' Party (PSOE) | 6,305 | 59.98 | +9.80 | 9 | +2 |
| Canarian Coalition (CC) | 2,759 | 26.25 | −6.51 | 3 | −1 |
| People's Party (PP) | 746 | 7.10 | −2.61 | 1 | ±0 |
| Canarian United Left (IUC) | 545 | 5.19 | −1.63 | 0 | −1 |
| Gomera Group of Independents (AGI) | 88 | 0.84 | New | 0 | ±0 |
| Blank ballots | 68 | 0.65 | +0.13 | | |
| Total | 10,511 | | | 13 | ±0 |
| Valid votes | 10,511 | 99.32 | −0.29 | | |
| Invalid votes | 72 | 0.68 | +0.29 | | |
| Votes cast / turnout | 10,583 | 72.65 | −3.86 | | |
| Abstentions | 3,984 | 27.35 | +3.86 | | |
| Registered voters | 14,567 | | | | |

=== La Palma ===
← Summary of the 13 June 1999 Island Council of La Palma election results →
| Parties and alliances | Popular vote | | | Seats | |
| Parties and alliances | Votes | % | ±pp | Total | +/− |
|---|---|---|---|---|---|
| Canarian Coalition (CC) | 20,298 | 46.45 | +10.15 | 10 | +2 |
| Spanish Socialist Workers' Party (PSOE) | 13,881 | 31.77 | −6.74 | 7 | −2 |
| People's Party (PP) | 7,451 | 17.05 | −1.28 | 4 | ±0 |
| Canarian United Left (IUC) | 922 | 2.11 | −2.64 | 0 | ±0 |
| The Greens of the Canaries (Verdes) | 787 | 1.80 | New | 0 | ±0 |
| Blank ballots | 355 | 0.81 | −0.03 | | |
| Total | 43,694 | | | 21 | ±0 |
| Valid votes | 43,694 | 99.37 | −0.10 | | |
| Invalid votes | 276 | 0.63 | +0.10 | | |
| Votes cast / turnout | 43,970 | 69.91 | +1.52 | | |
| Abstentions | 18,928 | 30.09 | −1.52 | | |
| Registered voters | 62,898 | | | | |

=== Lanzarote ===
← Summary of the 13 June 1999 Island Council of Lanzarote election results →
| Parties and alliances | Popular vote | | | Seats | |
| Parties and alliances | Votes | % | ±pp | Total | +/− |
|---|---|---|---|---|---|
| Lanzarote Independents Party (PIL) | 11,438 | 30.85 | −0.96 | 7 | −1 |
| Spanish Socialist Workers' Party (PSOE) | 9,816 | 26.47 | −0.51 | 6 | −1 |
| Canarian Coalition (CC) | 9,448 | 25.48 | +10.51 | 6 | +3 |
| People's Party (PP) | 3,781 | 10.20 | −4.59 | 2 | −1 |
| Canarian United Left (IUC) | 1,026 | 2.77 | −0.63 | 0 | ±0 |
| Independent People's Group of Lanzarote (APIL) | 635 | 1.71 | New | 0 | ±0 |
| Centrist Union–Democratic and Social Centre (UC–CDS) | 166 | 0.45 | −2.47 | 0 | ±0 |
| Blank ballots | 769 | 2.07 | +0.83 | | |
| Total | 37,079 | | | 21 | ±0 |
| Valid votes | 37,079 | 99.44 | −0.10 | | |
| Invalid votes | 208 | 0.56 | +0.10 | | |
| Votes cast / turnout | 37,287 | 54.80 | −6.36 | | |
| Abstentions | 30,751 | 45.20 | +6.36 | | |
| Registered voters | 68,038 | | | | |

=== Tenerife ===
← Summary of the 13 June 1999 Island Council of Tenerife election results →
| Parties and alliances | Popular vote | | | Seats | |
| Parties and alliances | Votes | % | ±pp | Total | +/− |
|---|---|---|---|---|---|
| Canarian Coalition (CC) | 150,296 | 44.75 | +3.29 | 14 | +2 |
| Spanish Socialist Workers' Party (PSOE) | 94,660 | 28.18 | +1.64 | 8 | ±0 |
| People's Party (PP) | 52,601 | 15.66 | −7.22 | 5 | −1 |
| Canarian United Left (IUC) | 12,276 | 3.65 | −1.43 | 0 | −1 |
| Canarian Nationalist Party (PNC) | 10,379 | 3.09 | New | 0 | ±0 |
| The Greens of the Canaries (Verdes) | 6,174 | 1.84 | New | 0 | ±0 |
| Centrist Union–Democratic and Social Centre (UC–CDS) | 2,735 | 0.81 | +0.12 | 0 | ±0 |
| Canarian Alternative–Independent Citizens of the Canaries (AC–CICA) | 776 | 0.23 | New | 0 | ±0 |
| Humanist Party (PH) | 562 | 0.17 | +0.03 | 0 | ±0 |
| Blank ballots | 5,419 | 1.61 | +0.50 | | |
| Total | 335,878 | | | 27 | ±0 |
| Valid votes | 335,878 | 99.41 | +0.02 | | |
| Invalid votes | 1,997 | 0.59 | −0.02 | | |
| Votes cast / turnout | 337,875 | 61.69 | −0.82 | | |
| Abstentions | 209,837 | 38.31 | +0.82 | | |
| Registered voters | 547,712 | | | | |
