= 1995 Canarian island council elections =

Elections in the Spanish region of the Canary Islands

Island council elections were held in the Canary Islands on 28 May 1995 to elect the 5th Island Councils (the cabildos insulares) of El Hierro, Fuerteventura, Gran Canaria, La Gomera, La Palma, Lanzarote and Tenerife. All 139 seats in the seven island councils were up for election. They were held concurrently with regional elections in thirteen autonomous communities (including the Canary Islands) and local elections all across Spain.

== Overall ==
← Summary of the 28 May 1995 Canarian island council election results →
| Parties and alliances | Popular vote | | | Seats | |
| Parties and alliances | Votes | % | ±pp | Total | +/− |
|---|---|---|---|---|---|
| Canarian Coalition (CC)^{1} | 263,816 | 33.15 | −0.12 | 42 | +6 |
| People's Party (PP) | 236,737 | 29.75 | +16.66 | 34 | +20 |
| Spanish Socialist Workers' Party (PSOE) | 188,302 | 23.66 | −10.31 | 43 | −8 |
| Canarian United Left (IUC) | 38,132 | 4.79 | New | 2 | +2 |
| Nationalist Canarian Platform (PCN) | 30,290 | 3.81 | +1.16 | 12 | −3 |
| Party of Gran Canaria (PGC) | 15,234 | 1.91 | New | 0 | ±0 |
| Lanzarote Independents Party (PIL) | 10,582 | 1.33 | −0.84 | 8 | −4 |
| Independents of Fuerteventura (IF) | 4,474 | 0.56 | +0.08 | 4 | +1 |
| Coalition for Gran Canaria (CGC) | 10,532 | 1.32 | New | 0 | ±0 |
| Democratic and Social Centre–Centrist Union (CDS–UC) | 5,321 | 0.67 | −11.28 | 0 | −18 |
| Independent Herrenian Group (AHI) | 2,398 | 0.30 | +0.08 | 6 | +2 |
| Popular Front of the Canary Islands–Awañac (FREPIC–Awañac) | 2,331 | 0.29 | −0.22 | 0 | ±0 |
| Tenerife Assembly (ATF) | 2,227 | 0.28 | New | 0 | ±0 |
| National Congress of the Canaries (CNC) | 2,076 | 0.26 | New | 0 | ±0 |
| Humanist Platform (PH)^{2} | 1,251 | 0.16 | −0.02 | 0 | ±0 |
| Green Left of the Canary Islands (Izegzawen) | 1,243 | 0.16 | New | 0 | ±0 |
| Nationalist Lanzarote Assembly (ACON) | 970 | 0.12 | New | 0 | ±0 |
| Tenerife Independent Familiar Groups (AFIT) | 662 | 0.08 | New | 0 | ±0 |
| Party of The People (LG) | 572 | 0.07 | −0.13 | 0 | ±0 |
| Socialist Canarian Party (PCS) | 325 | 0.04 | New | 0 | ±0 |
| Canarian Initiative (ICAN)^{3} | 293 | 0.04 | −0.03 | 0 | −1 |
| Blank ballots | 8,344 | 1.05 | +0.31 | | |
| Total | 795,822 | | | 139 | ±0 |
| Valid votes | 795,822 | 99.41 | +0.14 | | |
| Invalid votes | 4,686 | 0.59 | −0.14 | | |
| Votes cast / turnout | 800,508 | 64.98 | +3.12 | | |
| Abstentions | 431,431 | 35.02 | −3.12 | | |
| Registered voters | 1,231,939 | | | | |
Sources
Footnotes: ^{1} Canarian Coalition results are compared to the combined totals of Tenerife Group of Independents, Canarian Initiative (not including results in El Hierro), La Palma Group of Independents and Majorera Assembly in the 1991 elections.; ^{2} Humanist Platform results are compared to The Greens Ecologist–Humanist List totals in the 1991 elections.; ^{3} Nationalist Canarian Initiative results are compared to Canarian Initiative totals in El Hierro in the 1991 elections.

Popular vote
| CC | 33.15% |
| PP | 29.75% |
| PSOE | 23.66% |
| IUC | 4.79% |
| PCN | 3.81% |
| CGC | 1.32% |
| AHI | 0.30% |
| Others | 2.17% |
| Blank ballots | 1.05% |

Seats
| PSOE | 30.94% |
| CC | 30.22% |
| PP | 24.46% |
| PCN | 8.63% |
| AHI | 4.32% |
| IUC | 1.44% |

== Island control ==
The following table lists party control in the island councils. Gains for a party are highlighted in that party's colour.

| Island | Population | Previous control | New control |
|---|---|---|---|
| El Hierro | 7,846 | Spanish Socialist Workers' Party (PSOE) | Independent Herrenian Group (AHI) |
| Fuerteventura | 41,477 | Canarian Coalition (CC) | Independents of Fuerteventura (IF) |
| Gran Canaria | 715,860 | Canarian Coalition (CC) | People's Party (PP) |
| La Gomera | 16,812 | Spanish Socialist Workers' Party (PSOE) | Spanish Socialist Workers' Party (PSOE) |
| La Palma | 81,724 | Spanish Socialist Workers' Party (PSOE) | Spanish Socialist Workers' Party (PSOE) (CC in 1996) |
| Lanzarote | 75,110 | Spanish Socialist Workers' Party (PSOE) | Lanzarote Independents Party (PIL) (PSOE in 1997) |
| Tenerife | 669,271 | Canarian Coalition (CC) | Canarian Coalition (CC) |

== Islands ==
=== El Hierro ===
← Summary of the 28 May 1995 Island Council of El Hierro election results →
| Parties and alliances | Popular vote | | | Seats | |
| Parties and alliances | Votes | % | ±pp | Total | +/− |
|---|---|---|---|---|---|
| Independent Herrenian Group (AHI) | 2,398 | 49.31 | +12.79 | 6 | +2 |
| Spanish Socialist Workers' Party (PSOE) | 1,162 | 23.89 | −8.14 | 3 | −1 |
| People's Party (PP) | 936 | 19.25 | −0.76 | 2 | ±0 |
| Canarian Initiative (ICAN) | 293 | 6.03 | −5.21 | 0 | −1 |
| Canarian United Left (IUC) | 42 | 0.86 | New | 0 | ±0 |
| Democratic and Social Centre–Centrist Union (CDS–UC) | 9 | 0.19 | New | 0 | ±0 |
| Blank ballots | 23 | 0.47 | +0.28 | | |
| Total | 4,863 | | | 11 | ±0 |
| Valid votes | 4,863 | 99.71 | +0.04 | | |
| Invalid votes | 14 | 0.29 | −0.04 | | |
| Votes cast / turnout | 4,877 | 81.75 | +6.93 | | |
| Abstentions | 1,089 | 18.25 | −6.93 | | |
| Registered voters | 5,966 | | | | |

=== Fuerteventura ===
← Summary of the 28 May 1995 Island Council of Fuerteventura election results →
| Parties and alliances | Popular vote | | | Seats | |
| Parties and alliances | Votes | % | ±pp | Total | +/− |
|---|---|---|---|---|---|
| Canarian Coalition (CC)^{1} | 7,061 | 34.44 | −1.55 | 6 | −1 |
| Independents of Fuerteventura (IF) | 4,474 | 21.82 | +3.24 | 4 | +1 |
| People's Party (PP) | 4,136 | 20.17 | +15.37 | 4 | +4 |
| Spanish Socialist Workers' Party (PSOE) | 4,124 | 20.12 | −1.39 | 3 | −1 |
| Canarian United Left (IUC) | 457 | 2.23 | New | 0 | ±0 |
| Democratic and Social Centre–Centrist Union (CDS–UC) | 81 | 0.40 | −18.09 | 0 | −3 |
| Blank ballots | 169 | 0.82 | +0.20 | | |
| Total | 20,502 | | | 17 | ±0 |
| Valid votes | 20,502 | 99.38 | ±0.00 | | |
| Invalid votes | 127 | 0.62 | ±0.00 | | |
| Votes cast / turnout | 20,629 | 69.11 | −0.51 | | |
| Abstentions | 9,220 | 30.89 | +0.51 | | |
| Registered voters | 29,849 | | | | |
Sources
Footnotes: ^{1} Canarian Coalition results are compared to Majorera Assembly totals in the 1991 election.

=== Gran Canaria ===
← Summary of the 28 May 1995 Island Council of Gran Canaria election results →
| Parties and alliances | Popular vote | | | Seats | |
| Parties and alliances | Votes | % | ±pp | Total | +/− |
|---|---|---|---|---|---|
| People's Party (PP) | 143,987 | 39.83 | +21.36 | 14 | +8 |
| Canarian Coalition (CC)^{1} | 99,017 | 27.39 | +8.50 | 9 | +4 |
| Spanish Socialist Workers' Party (PSOE) | 66,992 | 18.53 | −16.95 | 6 | −6 |
| Canarian United Left (IUC) | 17,382 | 4.81 | New | 0 | ±0 |
| Party of Gran Canaria (PGC) | 15,234 | 4.21 | New | 0 | ±0 |
| Coalition for Gran Canaria (CGC) | 10,532 | 2.91 | New | 0 | ±0 |
| Popular Front of the Canary Islands–Awañac (FREPIC–Awañac) | 2,331 | 0.64 | +0.22 | 0 | ±0 |
| Democratic and Social Centre–Centrist Union (CDS–UC) | 1,501 | 0.42 | −18.37 | 0 | −6 |
| Humanist Platform (PH)^{2} | 786 | 0.22 | −0.17 | 0 | ±0 |
| Blank ballots | 3,726 | 1.03 | +0.25 | | |
| Total | 361,488 | | | 29 | ±0 |
| Valid votes | 361,488 | 99.41 | +0.19 | | |
| Invalid votes | 2,144 | 0.59 | −0.19 | | |
| Votes cast / turnout | 363,632 | 66.65 | +4.02 | | |
| Abstentions | 181,943 | 33.35 | −4.02 | | |
| Registered voters | 545,575 | | | | |
Sources
Footnotes: ^{1} Canarian Coalition results are compared to the combined totals of Canarian Initiative and Canarian Nationalist Party in the 1991 election.; ^{2} Humanist Platform results are compared to The Greens Ecologist–Humanist List totals in the 1991 election.

=== La Gomera ===
← Summary of the 28 May 1995 Island Council of La Gomera election results →
| Parties and alliances | Popular vote | | | Seats | |
| Parties and alliances | Votes | % | ±pp | Total | +/− |
|---|---|---|---|---|---|
| Spanish Socialist Workers' Party (PSOE) | 4,993 | 50.18 | −6.95 | 7 | −1 |
| Canarian Coalition (CC)^{1} | 3,260 | 32.76 | +26.76 | 4 | +4 |
| People's Party (PP) | 966 | 9.71 | +6.51 | 1 | +1 |
| Canarian United Left (IUC) | 679 | 6.82 | New | 1 | +1 |
| Democratic and Social Centre–Gomera Group of Independents (CDS–AGI) | n/a | n/a | −32.77 | 0 | −5 |
| Blank ballots | 52 | 0.52 | +0.10 | | |
| Total | 9,950 | | | 13 | ±0 |
| Valid votes | 9,950 | 99.61 | −0.12 | | |
| Invalid votes | 39 | 0.39 | +0.12 | | |
| Votes cast / turnout | 9,989 | 76.51 | +5.24 | | |
| Abstentions | 3,067 | 23.49 | −5.24 | | |
| Registered voters | 13,056 | | | | |
Sources
Footnotes: ^{1} Canarian Coalition results are compared to Canarian Initiative totals in the 1991 election.

=== La Palma ===
← Summary of the 28 May 1995 Island Council of La Palma election results →
| Parties and alliances | Popular vote | | | Seats | |
| Parties and alliances | Votes | % | ±pp | Total | +/− |
|---|---|---|---|---|---|
| Spanish Socialist Workers' Party (PSOE) | 16,074 | 38.51 | +5.68 | 9 | +2 |
| Canarian Coalition (CC)^{1} | 15,151 | 36.30 | −6.37 | 8 | −1 |
| People's Party (PP) | 7,653 | 18.33 | −0.55 | 4 | ±0 |
| Canarian United Left (IUC) | 1,984 | 4.75 | New | 0 | ±0 |
| Democratic and Social Centre–Centrist Union (CDS–UC) | 528 | 1.26 | −4.05 | 0 | −1 |
| Blank ballots | 350 | 0.84 | +0.54 | | |
| Total | 41,740 | | | 21 | ±0 |
| Valid votes | 41,740 | 99.47 | +0.02 | | |
| Invalid votes | 223 | 0.53 | −0.02 | | |
| Votes cast / turnout | 41,963 | 68.39 | +0.98 | | |
| Abstentions | 19,394 | 31.61 | −0.98 | | |
| Registered voters | 61,357 | | | | |
Sources
Footnotes: ^{1} Canarian Coalition results are compared to the combined totals of La Palma Group of Independents and Canarian Initiative in the 1991 election.

=== Lanzarote ===
← Summary of the 28 May 1995 Island Council of Lanzarote election results →
| Parties and alliances | Popular vote | | | Seats | |
| Parties and alliances | Votes | % | ±pp | Total | +/− |
|---|---|---|---|---|---|
| Lanzarote Independents Party (PIL) | 10,582 | 31.81 | −16.98 | 8 | −4 |
| Spanish Socialist Workers' Party (PSOE) | 8,973 | 26.98 | −0.29 | 7 | +1 |
| Canarian Coalition (CC)^{1} | 4,979 | 14.97 | +10.54 | 3 | +3 |
| People's Party (PP) | 4,919 | 14.79 | +11.44 | 3 | +3 |
| Canarian United Left (IUC) | 1,131 | 3.40 | New | 0 | ±0 |
| Democratic and Social Centre–Centrist Union (CDS–UC) | 971 | 2.92 | −11.78 | 0 | −3 |
| Nationalist Lanzarote Assembly (ACON) | 970 | 2.92 | New | 0 | ±0 |
| Socialist Canarian Party (PCS) | 325 | 0.98 | New | 0 | ±0 |
| Blank ballots | 414 | 1.24 | +0.77 | | |
| Total | 33,264 | | | 21 | ±0 |
| Valid votes | 33,264 | 99.54 | −0.09 | | |
| Invalid votes | 153 | 0.46 | +0.09 | | |
| Votes cast / turnout | 33,417 | 61.16 | +2.65 | | |
| Abstentions | 21,218 | 38.84 | −2.65 | | |
| Registered voters | 54,635 | | | | |
Sources
Footnotes: ^{1} Canarian Coalition results are compared to the combined totals of Canarian Initiative and Canarian Nationalist Party in the 1991 election.

=== Tenerife ===
← Summary of the 28 May 1995 Island Council of Tenerife election results →
| Parties and alliances | Popular vote | | | Seats | |
| Parties and alliances | Votes | % | ±pp | Total | +/− |
|---|---|---|---|---|---|
| Canarian Coalition–Tenerife Group of Independents (CC–ATI)^{1} | 134,348 | 41.46 | −11.19 | 12 | −3 |
| Spanish Socialist Workers' Party (PSOE) | 85,984 | 26.54 | −6.69 | 8 | −2 |
| People's Party (PP) | 74,140 | 22.88 | +14.88 | 6 | +4 |
| Canarian United Left (IUC) | 16,457 | 5.08 | New | 1 | +1 |
| Democratic and Social Centre–Centrist Union (CDS–UC) | 2,231 | 0.69 | −3.21 | 0 | ±0 |
| Tenerife Assembly (ATF) | 2,227 | 0.69 | New | 0 | ±0 |
| National Congress of the Canaries (CNC) | 2,076 | 0.64 | New | 0 | ±0 |
| Green Left of the Canary Islands (Izegzawen) | 1,243 | 0.38 | New | 0 | ±0 |
| Tenerife Independent Familiar Groups (AFIT) | 662 | 0.20 | New | 0 | ±0 |
| Party of The People (LG) | 572 | 0.18 | −0.11 | 0 | ±0 |
| Humanist Platform (PH) | 465 | 0.14 | New | 0 | ±0 |
| Blank ballots | 3,610 | 1.11 | +0.29 | | |
| Total | 324,015 | | | 27 | ±0 |
| Valid votes | 324,015 | 99.39 | +0.16 | | |
| Invalid votes | 1,986 | 0.61 | −0.16 | | |
| Votes cast / turnout | 326,001 | 62.51 | +2.69 | | |
| Abstentions | 195,500 | 37.49 | −2.69 | | |
| Registered voters | 521,501 | | | | |
Sources
Footnotes: ^{1} Canarian Coalition–Tenerife Group of Independents results are compared to the combined totals of Tenerife Group of Independents, Canarian Initiative and Canarian Nationalist Party in the 1991 election.
