= San Vicente de Robres =

- Populated place
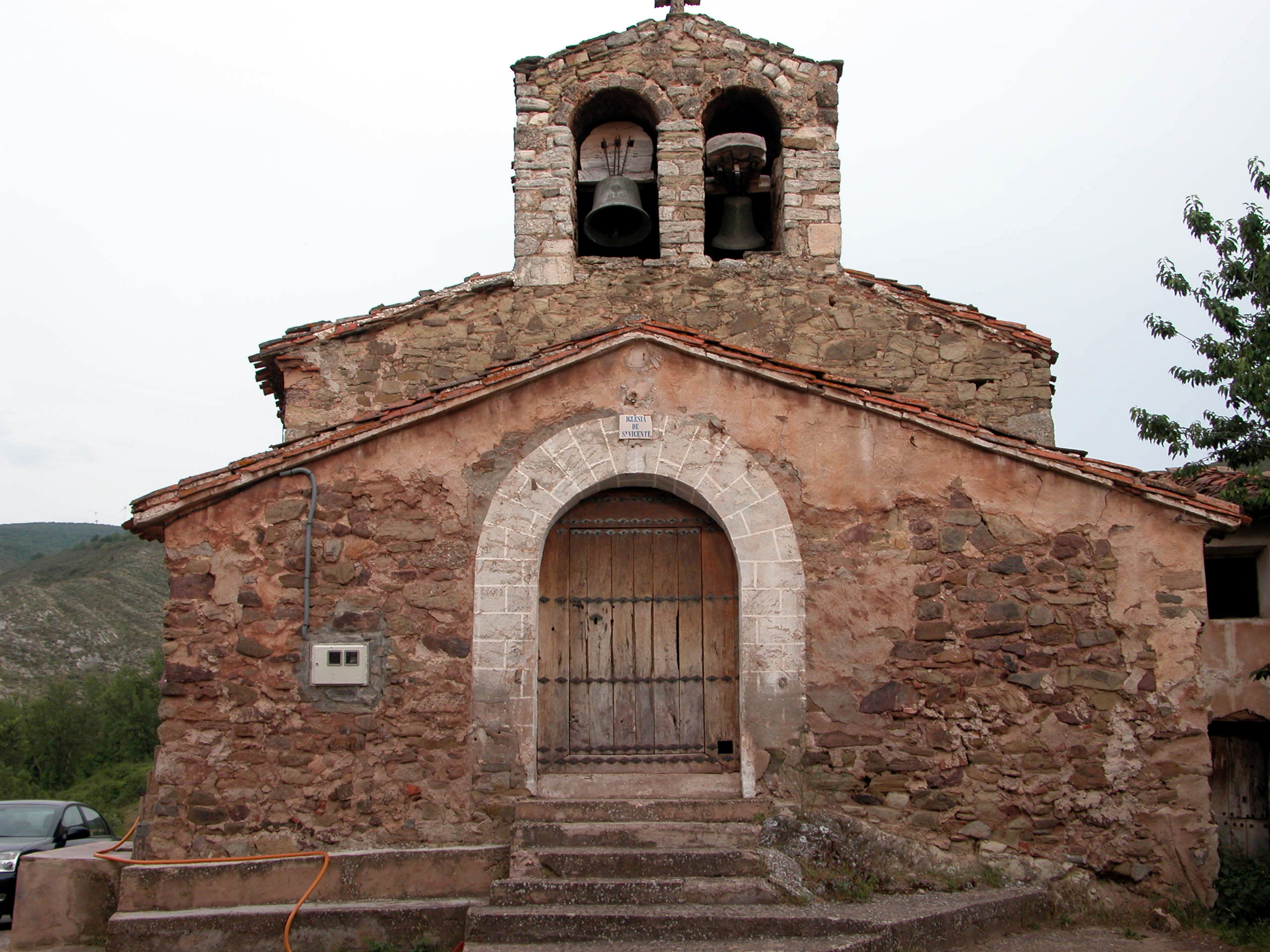
- Saint Vincent Church.

- Location within La Rioja, Spain Location within Spain
- Country: Spain
- Autonomous community: La Rioja
- Comarca: Logroño

Population
  - Total: 30
- Postal code: 26131

San Vicente de Robres is a village in the municipality of Robres del Castillo, in the province and autonomous community of La Rioja, Spain. As of 2018 had a population of 21 people.
