= 1995 Spanish local elections =

- 28 May 1995 (Note: By-elections were held on 5 November 1995 in those constituencies where results were annulled by a final sentence following an electoral petition, or where elections were not held due to a lack of candidates.)

All 65,869 councillors in 8,067 municipal councils (Note: Including 50 seats in the assemblies of Ceuta and Melilla.) All 1,385 provincial/island seats in 44 provinces (Note: Including: 1,034 seats in 38 provincial deputations; 153 seats in 3 Basque foral deputations; 139 seats in 7 Canarian island cabildos; 59 seats in 3 Balearic island councils.)
- Opinion polls
- Registered: 31,953,812 ▲5.7%
- Turnout: 22,324,852 (69.9%) ▲7.1 pp
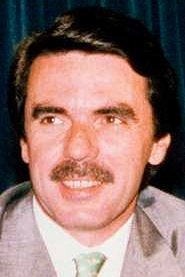

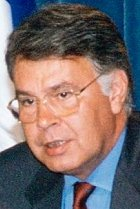

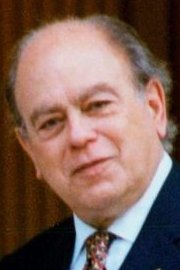

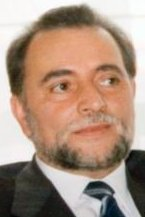

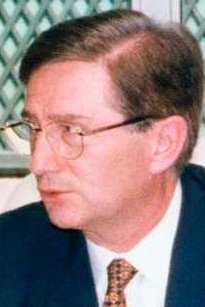

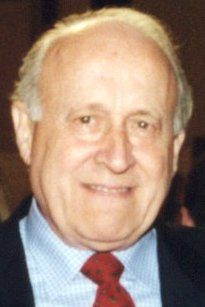
	First party	Second party	Third party
Leader	José María Aznar	Felipe González	Jordi Pujol
Party	PP	PSOE	CiU
Leader since	4 September 1989	13 October 1974	19 September 1978
Last election	19,543 c., 25.7% 391 p.	25,365 c., 38.7% (Note: Results data for PSOE (38.3%, 25,260 c. and 628 p.) and EE (0.4%, 105 c. and 8 p.) in the 1991 elections.); 636 p.	4,360 c., 4.9% 68 p.
Seats won	24,772 c. 553 p.	21,189 c. 479 p.	4,265 c. 64 p.
Seat change	▲5,229 c. ▲162 p.	▼4,176 c. ▼157 p.	▼95 c. ▼4 p.
Popular vote	7,820,392	6,838,607	975,037
Percentage	35.3%	30.8%	4.4%
Swing	▲9.6 pp	▼7.9 pp	▼0.5 pp
	Fourth party	Fifth party	Sixth party
Leader	Julio Anguita	José María Mur	Xabier Arzalluz
Party	IU	PAR	EAJ/PNV
Leader since	12 February 1989	July 1987	18 January 1985
Last election	2,531 c., 8.0% 36 p.	1,221 c., 0.7% 15 p.	993 c., 1.6% 47 p.
Seats won	3,493 c. 82 p.	1,050 c. 11 p.	1,015 c. 47 p.
Seat change	▲962 c. ▲46 p.	▼171 c. ▼4 p.	▲22 c. 0 p.
Popular vote	2,589,780	116,447	313,318
Percentage	11.7%	0.5%	1.4%
Swing	▲3.7 pp	▼0.2 pp	▼0.2 pp
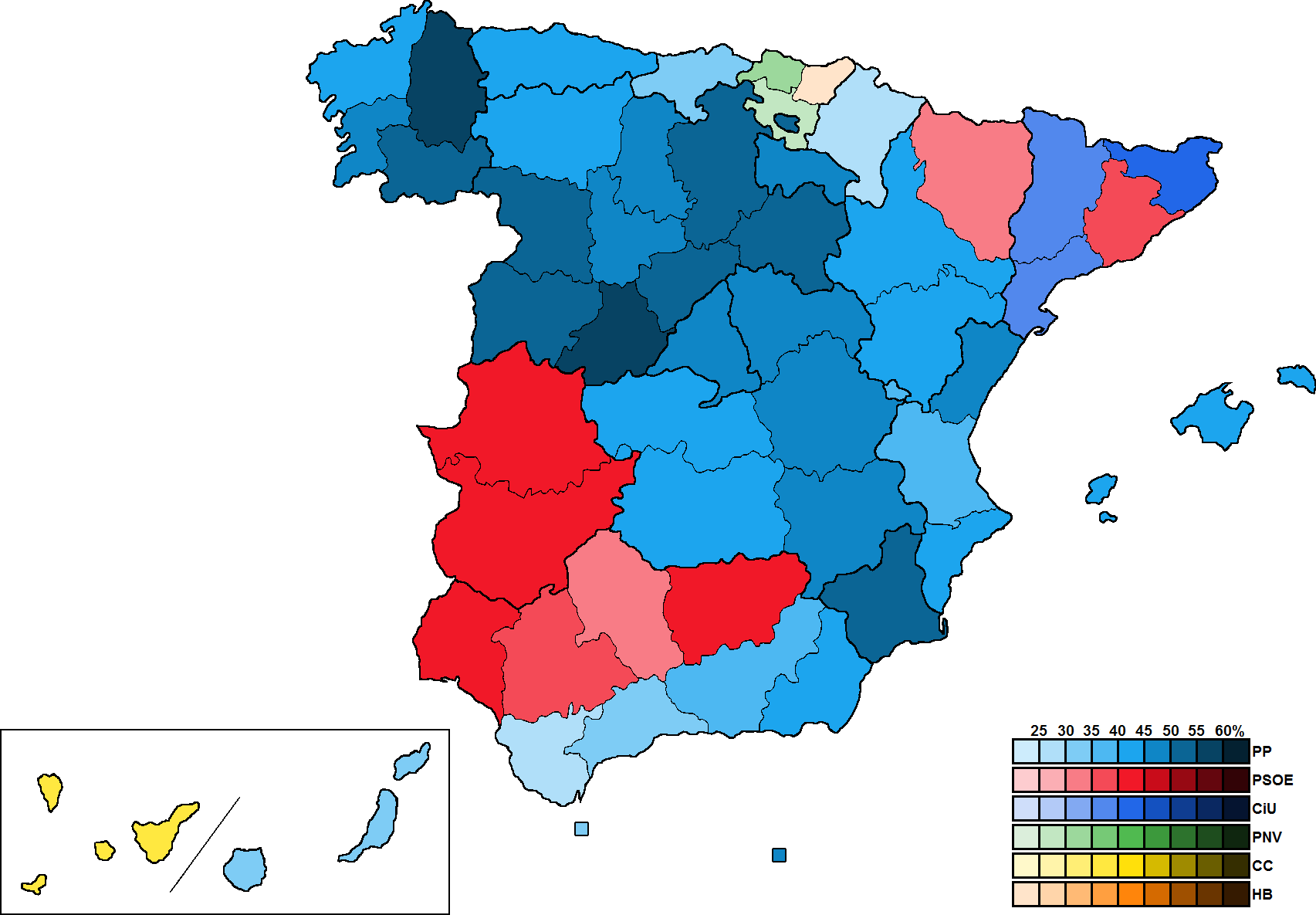
- Provincial results map for municipal elections

Local elections were held in Spain on 28 May 1995 to elect all 65,869 councillors in the 8,067 Spanish municipalities (including 50 seats in the assemblies of the autonomous cities of Ceuta and Melilla), all 1,187 provincial seats in 41 provinces (including 38 indirectly-elected provincial deputations and the three foral deputations in the Basque Country) and 198 seats in ten island councils (seven Canarian and three Balearic ones). They were held concurrently with regional elections in thirteen autonomous communities.

== Overview ==
=== Local government ===
Under the 1978 Constitution, the governance of municipalities in Spain was centered on the figure of city councils (Spanish: ayuntamientos), local corporations with independent legal personality composed of a mayor, a government council and an elected legislative assembly. The mayor was indirectly elected by the local assembly, requiring an absolute majority; otherwise, the candidate from the most-voted party automatically became mayor (ties were resolved by drawing lots). The concejo abierto system (English: open council), under which voters directly elected the local mayor by plurality voting, was reserved for municipalities under 100 inhabitants and some minor local entities.

Provincial deputations were the governing bodies of provinces in Spain—except for single-province autonomous communities—having an administration role of municipal activities and composed of a provincial president, an administrative body, and a plenary. For insular provinces, such as the Balearic and Canary Islands, deputations were replaced by island councils in each of the islands or group of islands. For Gran Canaria, Tenerife, Fuerteventura, La Gomera, El Hierro, Lanzarote and La Palma, this figure was referred to in Spanish as cabildo insular, whereas for Mallorca, Menorca and Ibiza–Formentera, its name was consejo insular (Catalan: consell insular). (Note: For the Balearic Islands, regional lawmakers served as island councillors.) The three Basque provinces had foral deputations instead (called General Assemblies, or Juntas Generales).

=== Date ===
The term of local assemblies in Spain expired four years after the date of their previous election, with election day being fixed for the fourth Sunday of May every four years. The election decree was required to be issued no later than 54 days before the scheduled election date and published on the following day in the Official State Gazette (BOE). The previous local elections were held on 26 May 1991, setting the date for election day on the fourth Sunday of May four years later, which was 28 May 1995.

Local assemblies could not be dissolved before the expiration of their term, except in cases of mismanagement that seriously harmed the public interest and implied a breach of constitutional obligations, in which case the Council of Ministers could—optionally—decide to call a by-election.

Elections to the assemblies of local entities were officially called on 4 April 1995 with the publication of the corresponding decree in the BOE, setting election day for 28 May. Subsequent by-elections were called on 12 September, for 5 November.

=== Electoral system ===
Voting for local assemblies and Canarian island councils was based on universal suffrage, comprising all Spanish nationals over 18 years of age, registered and residing in the municipality or council and with full political rights (provided that they had not been deprived of the right to vote by a final sentence, nor were legally incapacitated), as well as resident non-nationals whose country of origin allowed reciprocal voting by virtue of a treaty or within the framework of Community Law.

Local councillors were elected using the D'Hondt method and closed-list proportional voting, with a five percent-threshold of valid votes (including blank ballots) in each constituency. Each municipality or council was a multi-member constituency, with a number of seats based on the following scale:

Population	Councillors		
Population	Municipalities	Canary Islands	Balearic Islands
<250	5	No island below 5,000 inhabitants	Fixed number: Ibiza–Formentera: 13; Menorca: 13; Mallorca: 33
251–1,000	7	No island below 5,000 inhabitants	Fixed number: Ibiza–Formentera: 13; Menorca: 13; Mallorca: 33
1,001–2,000	9	No island below 5,000 inhabitants	Fixed number: Ibiza–Formentera: 13; Menorca: 13; Mallorca: 33
2,001–5,000	11	No island below 5,000 inhabitants	Fixed number: Ibiza–Formentera: 13; Menorca: 13; Mallorca: 33
5,001–10,000	13	11	Fixed number: Ibiza–Formentera: 13; Menorca: 13; Mallorca: 33
10,001–20,000	17	13	Fixed number: Ibiza–Formentera: 13; Menorca: 13; Mallorca: 33
20,001–50,000	21	17	Fixed number: Ibiza–Formentera: 13; Menorca: 13; Mallorca: 33
50,001–100,000	25	21	Fixed number: Ibiza–Formentera: 13; Menorca: 13; Mallorca: 33
>100,001	+1 per each 100,000 inhabitants or fraction +1 if total is an even number		Fixed number: Ibiza–Formentera: 13; Menorca: 13; Mallorca: 33

Councillors in municipalities between 100 and 250 inhabitants were elected using open-list partial block voting, with voters choosing up to four candidates.

Most provincial deputations were indirectly elected by applying the D'Hondt method and a three percent-threshold of valid votes to municipal results—excluding candidacies not electing any councillor—in each judicial district. Seats were allocated to provincial deputations based on the following scale (with each judicial district being assigned an initial minimum of one seat and a maximum of three-fifths of the total number of provincial seats, with the remaining ones distributed in proportion to population):

Population	Seats
<500,000	25
500,001–1,000,000	27
1,000,001–3,500,000	31
>3,500,001	51

The General Assemblies of Álava, Biscay and Gipuzkoa were directly elected by voters under their own, specific electoral regulations.

The law did not provide for by-elections to fill vacant seats; instead, any vacancies arising after the proclamation of candidates and during the legislative term were filled by the next candidates on the party lists or, when required, by designated substitutes.

== Parties and candidates ==
The electoral law allowed for parties and federations registered in the interior ministry, alliances and groupings of electors to present lists of candidates. Parties and federations intending to form an alliance were required to inform the relevant electoral commission within 10 days of the election call, whereas groupings of electors needed to secure the signature of a determined amount of the electors registered in the municipality for which they sought election, disallowing electors from signing for more than one list:

- At least one percent of the electors in municipalities with a population below 5,000 inhabitants, provided that the number of signers was more than double that of councillors at stake.
- At least 100 signatures in municipalities with a population between 5,001 and 10,000.
- At least 500 signatures in municipalities with a population between 10,001 and 50,000.
- At least 1,500 signatures in municipalities with a population between 50,001 and 150,000.
- At least 3,000 signatures in municipalities with a population between 150,001 and 300,000.
- At least 5,000 signatures in municipalities with a population between 300,001 and 1,000,000.
- At least 8,000 signatures in municipalities with a population over 1,000,001.

== Opinion polls ==
The table below list opinion polling results in reverse chronological order, showing the most recent first and using the dates when the survey fieldwork was done, as opposed to the date of publication. Where the fieldwork dates are unknown, the date of publication is given instead. The highest percentage figure in each polling survey is displayed with its background shaded in the leading party's colour. If a tie ensues, this is applied to the figures with the highest percentages. The "Lead" column on the right shows the percentage-point difference between the parties with the highest percentages in a poll. Refusals are generally excluded from the party vote percentages, while question wording and the treatment of "don't know" responses and those not intending to vote may vary between polling organisations.

Polling firm/Commissioner	Fieldwork date	Sample size	Turnout	PSOE	PP	IU	Lead
1995 local elections	28 May 1995	—N/a	69.9	30.8	35.3	11.7	4.5
Demoscopia/El País	10–15 May 1995	16,700	?	28.0	36.9	13.3	8.9
1991 local elections	26 May 1991	—N/a	62.8	38.3	25.7	8.0	12.6

== Results ==
=== Municipal ===
==== Overall ====
← Summary of the 28 May 1995 Spanish municipal election results →
Parties and alliances	Popular vote			Councillors	
Parties and alliances	Votes	%	±pp	Total	+/−
People's Party (PP)	7,820,392	35.27	+9.56	**24,772**	+5,229
People's Party (PP)	7,743,656	34.93	+9.59	24,479	+5,181
Navarrese People's Union (UPN)	76,736	0.35	−0.01	293	+48
Spanish Socialist Workers' Party (PSOE)^{1}	6,838,607	30.84	−7.88	**21,189**	−4,176
United Left (IU)	2,589,780	11.68	+3.71	**3,493**	+962
Convergence and Union (CiU)	975,037	4.40	−0.46	**4,265**	−95
Basque Nationalist Party (EAJ/PNV)	313,318	1.41	−0.18	**1,015**	+22
Andalusian Party (PA)	260,249	1.17	−0.65	**345**	−195
Canarian Coalition (CC)	247,219	1.12	−0.15	**429**	+65
Canarian Coalition (CC)^{2}	211,882	0.96	+0.28	372	+126
Canarian Initiative (ICAN)^{3}	21,140	0.10	−0.45	30	−83
Nationalist Canarian Centre (CCN)	10,915	0.05	New	19	+19
Independents of Gran Canaria (IGC)	3,282	0.01	−0.03	8	+3
Galician Nationalist Bloc (BNG)	208,098	0.94	+0.37	**428**	+187
Republican Left of Catalonia (ERC)	204,906	0.92	+0.43	**525**	+297
Popular Unity (HB)	184,742	0.83	−0.23	**621**	−80
Basque Solidarity (EA)	133,576	0.60	−0.10	**406**	+13
Valencian Union–Independents–Centrists (UV–FICVA–CCV)	129,759	0.59	−0.40	**215**	−120
Aragonese Party (PAR)	116,447	0.53	−0.15	**1,050**	−171
Andalusian Progress Party (PAP)	86,895	0.39	New	**79**	+79
Valencian People's Union–Nationalist Bloc (UPV–BN)	84,462	0.38	+0.09	**168**	+76
Democratic and Social Centre (CDS)	81,560	0.37	−3.51	**261**	−2,678
Platform of Independents of Spain (PIE)	79,338	0.36	New	**206**	+206
Union for the Progress of Cantabria (UPCA)	41,628	0.19	−0.19	**170**	−115
Nationalists of the Balearic Islands (PSM–ENE)	40,246	0.18	+0.04	**97**	+31
Socialist Party of Mallorca–Nationalists of Majorca (PSM–NM)	37,230	0.17	+0.06	91	+37
Socialist Party of Menorca–Nationalists of the Islands (PSM–NI)^{4}	2,352	0.01	–0.01	6	–5
Nationalist and Ecologist Agreement (ENE)	664	0.00	–0.01	0	–1
Liberal Independent Group (GIL)	36,438	0.16	+0.05	**43**	+24
Leonese People's Union (UPL)	34,715	0.16	+0.11	**138**	+110
Regionalist Party of Cantabria (PRC)	33,221	0.15	+0.05	**88**	+19
Basque Citizen Initiative (ICV–Gorordo)	32,129	0.14	New	**5**	+5
Extremaduran Coalition (CEx)^{5}	28,060	0.13	+0.05	**139**	+72
Aragonese Union (CHA)	27,648	0.12	+0.07	**39**	+23
Nationalist Canarian Platform (PCN)	26,956	0.12	+0.05	**44**	−10
Party of Gran Canaria (PGC)	14,018	0.06	New	2	+2
Lanzarote Independents Party (PIL)	10,493	0.05	−0.01	31	−14
Independents of Fuerteventura (IF)	2,445	0.01	±0.00	11	+2
Convergence of Democrats of Navarre (CDN)	24,186	0.11	New	**42**	+42
The Greens–Green Group (LV–GV)	23,415	0.11	New	**1**	+1
Alavese Unity (UA)	21,562	0.10	−0.01	**37**	−2
Federation of Independents of Catalonia (FIC)	19,718	0.09	New	**177**	+177
Majorcan Union (UM)^{6}	18,713	0.08	+0.03	**44**	+23
Portuese Independents (IP)	16,522	0.07	+0.04	**16**	+8
The Greens (LV)	13,490	0.06	−0.38	**4**	−1
Asturianist Party (PAS)^{7}	13,414	0.06	±0.00	**6**	±0
Andalusian Federation of Independents (FADI)	12,964	0.06	New	**58**	+58
Riojan Party (PR)	11,842	0.05	+0.01	**103**	+21
Galician Nationalist Convergence (CNG)	11,551	0.05	−0.23	**21**	−116
The Alternative Greens (LVA)^{8}	11,519	0.05	−0.03	0	±0
Coalition for Gran Canaria (CGC)	10,970	0.05	New	**6**	+6
Independent Group of Ávila (AIAV)	10,547	0.05	New	**115**	+115
Independent Solution (SI)	10,310	0.05	−0.07	**61**	±0
Regionalist Unity of Castile and León (URCL)^{9}	10,004	0.05	+0.02	**98**	+62
Independent Herrenian Group (AHI)	1,724	0.01	±0.00	**8**	±0
Independent Sorian Alternative (ALSI)	1,715	0.01	New	**2**	+2
Others (lists at <0.05% not securing any provincial or island seat)	948,641	4.28	—	**4,840**	−1,003
Blank ballots	323,712	1.46	+0.33		
**Total**	**22,171,945**	**100.00**		**65,869**	**−439**
Valid votes	22,171,945	99.32	+0.02		
Invalid votes	152,907	0.68	−0.02		
**Votes cast / turnout**	**22,324,852**	**69.87**	**+7.09**		
Abstentions	9,628,960	30.13	−7.09		
**Registered voters**	**31,953,812**				
Sources
Footnotes: ^{1} Spanish Socialist Workers' Party results are compared to the combined totals of the Spanish Socialist Workers Party and Basque Country Left in the 1991 elections.; ^{2} Canarian Coalition results are compared to the combined totals of Tenerife Group of Independents, La Palma Group of Independents, Majorera Assembly and Independent Realejeran Group in the 1991 elections.; ^{3} Canarian Initiative are compared to the combined totals of Canarian Initiative and Canarian Nationalist Assembly in the 1991 elections.; ^{4} Socialist Party of Menorca–Nationalists of the Islands results are compared to Agreement of the Left of Menorca totals in the 1991 elections.; ^{5} Extremaduran Coalition results are compared to the combined totals of United Extremadura and Extremaduran Regionalist Party in the 1991 elections.; ^{6} Majorcan Union results are compared to Independent Union of Majorca–Independents of Majorca totals in the 1991 elections.; ^{7} Asturianist Party results are compared to Asturian Coalition totals in the 1991 elections.; ^{8} The Alternative Greens results are compared to Green Union totals in the 1991 elections.; ^{9} Regionalist Unity of Castile and León results are compared to Regionalist Democracy of Castile and León totals in the 1991 elections.

Popular vote
PP	35.27%
PSOE	30.84%
IU	11.68%
CiU	4.40%
EAJ/PNV	1.41%
PA	1.17%
CC	1.12%
BNG	0.94%
ERC	0.92%
HB	0.83%
EA	0.60%
UV–FICVA–CCV	0.59%
PAR	0.53%
Others	8.24%
Blank ballots	1.46%

==== City control ====
The following table lists party control in provincial capitals (highlighted in bold), as well as in municipalities above 75,000. Gains for a party are highlighted in that party's colour.

Municipality	Population	Previous control	New control
**A Coruña**	255,087	Spanish Socialist Workers' Party (PSOE)	Spanish Socialist Workers' Party (PSOE)
**Albacete**	141,179	Spanish Socialist Workers' Party (PSOE)	People's Party (PP)
Alcalá de Henares	166,250	Spanish Socialist Workers' Party (PSOE)	People's Party (PP)
Alcobendas	83,990	Spanish Socialist Workers' Party (PSOE)	Spanish Socialist Workers' Party (PSOE)
Alcorcón	103,787	Spanish Socialist Workers' Party (PSOE)	Spanish Socialist Workers' Party (PSOE)
Algeciras	102,079	Spanish Socialist Workers' Party (PSOE)	Andalusian Progress Party (PAP) (PA in 1996)
**Alicante**	274,964	Spanish Socialist Workers' Party (PSOE)	People's Party (PP)
**Almería**	167,361	Spanish Socialist Workers' Party (PSOE)	People's Party (PP)
**Ávila**	49,639	People's Party (PP)	People's Party (PP)
Avilés	88,570	Spanish Socialist Workers' Party (PSOE)	People's Party (PP)
**Badajoz**	130,153	Spanish Socialist Workers' Party (PSOE)	People's Party (PP)
Badalona	219,340	Socialists' Party of Catalonia (PSC–PSOE)	Socialists' Party of Catalonia (PSC–PSOE)
Barakaldo	103,594	Spanish Socialist Workers' Party (PSOE)	Spanish Socialist Workers' Party (PSOE)
**Barcelona**	1,630,867	Socialists' Party of Catalonia (PSC–PSOE)	Socialists' Party of Catalonia (PSC–PSOE)
**Bilbao**	371,876	Basque Nationalist Party (EAJ/PNV)	Basque Nationalist Party (EAJ/PNV)
**Burgos**	166,251	People's Party (PP)	People's Party (PP)
**Cáceres**	80,235	Spanish Socialist Workers' Party (PSOE)	People's Party (PP)
**Cádiz**	155,438	Spanish Socialist Workers' Party (PSOE)	People's Party (PP)
Cartagena	179,659	Spanish Socialist Workers' Party (PSOE)	People's Party (PP)
**Castellón de la Plana**	139,094	People's Party (PP)	People's Party (PP)
**Ciudad Real**	62,072	Spanish Socialist Workers' Party (PSOE)	People's Party (PP)
**Córdoba**	315,948	United Left (IU)	People's Party (PP)
Cornellà de Llobregat	84,142	Socialists' Party of Catalonia (PSC–PSOE)	Socialists' Party of Catalonia (PSC–PSOE)
Coslada	79,240	United Left (IU)	United Left (IU)
**Cuenca**	44,960	Spanish Socialist Workers' Party (PSOE)	People's Party (PP)
**Donostia-San Sebastián**	177,929	Spanish Socialist Workers' Party (PSOE)	Spanish Socialist Workers' Party (PSOE)
Dos Hermanas	82,814	Spanish Socialist Workers' Party (PSOE)	Spanish Socialist Workers' Party (PSOE)
Elche	191,305	Spanish Socialist Workers' Party (PSOE)	Spanish Socialist Workers' Party (PSOE)
Ferrol	85,692	Spanish Socialist Workers' Party (PSOE)	People's Party (PP)
Fuenlabrada	158,212	Spanish Socialist Workers' Party (PSOE)	Spanish Socialist Workers' Party (PSOE)
Getafe	144,368	Spanish Socialist Workers' Party (PSOE)	Spanish Socialist Workers' Party (PSOE)
Getxo	83,466	Basque Nationalist Party (EAJ/PNV)	Basque Nationalist Party (EAJ/PNV)
Gijón	269,644	Spanish Socialist Workers' Party (PSOE)	Spanish Socialist Workers' Party (PSOE)
**Girona**	72,333	Socialists' Party of Catalonia (PSC–PSOE)	Socialists' Party of Catalonia (PSC–PSOE)
**Granada**	271,180	Spanish Socialist Workers' Party (PSOE)	People's Party (PP)
**Guadalajara**	67,401	People's Party (PP)	People's Party (PP)
**Huelva**	145,049	Spanish Socialist Workers' Party (PSOE)	People's Party (PP)
**Huesca**	45,515	Spanish Socialist Workers' Party (PSOE)	Aragonese Party (PAR) (PP in 1997)
**Jaén**	112,772	Spanish Socialist Workers' Party (PSOE)	People's Party (PP)
Jerez de la Frontera	186,273	Andalusian Progress Party (PAP)	Andalusian Progress Party (PAP) (PA in 1996)
L'Hospitalet de Llobregat	266,642	Socialists' Party of Catalonia (PSC–PSOE)	Socialists' Party of Catalonia (PSC–PSOE)
**Las Palmas de Gran Canaria**	371,787	Spanish Socialist Workers' Party (PSOE)	People's Party (PP)
Leganés	178,162	Spanish Socialist Workers' Party (PSOE)	Spanish Socialist Workers' Party (PSOE)
**León**	147,311	People's Party (PP)	People's Party (PP)
**Lleida**	114,234	Socialists' Party of Catalonia (PSC–PSOE)	Socialists' Party of Catalonia (PSC–PSOE)
**Logroño**	124,823	Spanish Socialist Workers' Party (PSOE)	People's Party (PP)
**Lugo**	87,305	People's Party (PP)	People's Party (PP)
**Madrid**	3,041,101	People's Party (PP)	People's Party (PP)
**Málaga**	531,443	Spanish Socialist Workers' Party (PSOE)	People's Party (PP)
Marbella	86,013	Liberal Independent Group (GIL)	Liberal Independent Group (GIL)
Mataró	102,117	Socialists' Party of Catalonia (PSC–PSOE)	Socialists' Party of Catalonia (PSC–PSOE)
Móstoles	199,141	Spanish Socialist Workers' Party (PSOE)	Spanish Socialist Workers' Party (PSOE)
**Murcia**	341,531	Spanish Socialist Workers' Party (PSOE)	People's Party (PP)
**Ourense**	108,547	Spanish Socialist Workers' Party (PSOE)	People's Party (PP)
**Oviedo**	201,712	People's Party (PP)	People's Party (PP)
**Palencia**	79,561	Spanish Socialist Workers' Party (PSOE)	People's Party (PP)
**Palma de Mallorca**	322,008	People's Party (PP)	People's Party (PP)
**Pamplona**	182,465	Navarrese People's Union (UPN)	Convergence of Democrats of Navarre (CDN)
**Pontevedra**	76,461	People's Party (PP)	People's Party (PP)
Reus	90,059	Socialists' Party of Catalonia (PSC–PSOE)	Socialists' Party of Catalonia (PSC–PSOE)
Sabadell	189,006	Initiative for Catalonia (IC)	Initiative for Catalonia (IC)
**Salamanca**	167,382	Spanish Socialist Workers' Party (PSOE)	People's Party (PP)
San Cristóbal de La Laguna	125,183	Canarian Coalition (CC)	Canarian Coalition (CC)
San Fernando	87,588	Andalusian Party (PA)	Andalusian Party (PA)
Sant Boi de Llobregat	79,594	Socialists' Party of Catalonia (PSC–PSOE)	Socialists' Party of Catalonia (PSC–PSOE)
Santa Coloma de Gramenet	131,764	Socialists' Party of Catalonia (PSC–PSOE)	Socialists' Party of Catalonia (PSC–PSOE)
**Santa Cruz de Tenerife**	203,929	Canarian Coalition (CC)	Canarian Coalition (CC)
**Santander**	194,822	People's Party (PP)	People's Party (PP)
Santiago de Compostela	93,398	Spanish Socialist Workers' Party (PSOE)	Spanish Socialist Workers' Party (PSOE)
**Segovia**	55,372	People's Party (PP)	People's Party (PP)
**Seville**	714,148	Andalusian Party (PA)	People's Party (PP)
**Soria**	33,317	People's Party (PP)	People's Party (PP)
Talavera de la Reina	75,138	Spanish Socialist Workers' Party (PSOE)	People's Party (PP)
**Tarragona**	114,630	Convergence and Union (CiU)	Convergence and Union (CiU)
Telde	84,078	Canarian Coalition (CC)	Canarian Coalition (CC)
Terrassa	161,428	Socialists' Party of Catalonia (PSC–PSOE)	Socialists' Party of Catalonia (PSC–PSOE)
**Teruel**	29,971	Aragonese Party (PAR)	People's Party (PP)
**Toledo**	64,040	Spanish Socialist Workers' Party (PSOE)	People's Party (PP)
Torrejón de Ardoz	87,219	Spanish Socialist Workers' Party (PSOE)	People's Party (PP) (PSOE in 1997)
**Valencia**	764,293	People's Party (PP)	People's Party (PP)
**Valladolid**	336,917	Spanish Socialist Workers' Party (PSOE)	People's Party (PP)
Vigo	288,573	Spanish Socialist Workers' Party (PSOE)	People's Party (PP)
**Vitoria-Gasteiz**	214,148	Basque Nationalist Party (EAJ/PNV)	Basque Nationalist Party (EAJ/PNV)
**Zamora**	65,885	Spanish Socialist Workers' Party (PSOE)	People's Party (PP)
**Zaragoza**	606,620	Spanish Socialist Workers' Party (PSOE)	People's Party (PP)

==== Autonomous cities ====
The following table lists party control in the autonomous cities. Gains for a party are highlighted in that party's colour.

City	Population	Previous control	New control
Ceuta	71,926	→ Newly-established	Progress and Future of Ceuta (PFC) (PP in 1996)
Melilla	63,570	→ Newly-established	People's Party (PP) (PIM in 1998)

=== Provincial and island ===
==== Summary ====
← Summary of the 28 May 1995 Spanish provincial and island election results →
Parties and alliances	Seats				
Parties and alliances	PD	IC	FD	Total	+/−
People's Party (PP)	464	64	25	**553**	+162
Spanish Socialist Workers' Party (PSOE)^{1}	394	59	26	**479**	−157
United Left (IU)	68	5	9	**82**	+46
Convergence and Union (CiU)	64	—	—	**64**	−4
Basque Nationalist Party (EAJ/PNV)	—	—	47	**47**	±0
Canarian Coalition (CC)^{2}	—	42	—	**42**	+6
Popular Unity (HB)	—	—	20	**20**	−7
Basque Solidarity (EA)	—	—	15	**15**	−4
Nationalist Canarian Platform (PCN)	—	12	—	**12**	−3
Lanzarote Independents Party (PIL)	—	8	—	8	−4
Independents of Fuerteventura (IF)	—	4	—	4	+1
Galician Nationalist Bloc (BNG)	11	—	—	**11**	+8
Aragonese Party (PAR)	11	—	—	**11**	−4
Alavese Unity (UA)	—	—	9	**9**	−2
Andalusian Party (PA)	6	—	—	**6**	−9
Nationalists of the Balearic Islands (PSM–ENE)	—	6	—	**6**	+1
Socialist Party of Mallorca–Nationalists of Mallorca (PSM–NM)	—	5	—	5	+2
Socialist Party of Menorca–Nationalists of the Islands (PSM–NI)^{3}	—	1	—	1	−1
Independent Herrenian Group (AHI)	—	6	—	**6**	+2
Andalusian Progress Party (PAP)	5	—	—	**5**	+5
Liberal Independent Group (GIL)	3	—	—	**3**	+1
Republican Left of Catalonia (ERC)	2	—	—	**2**	+2
Leonese People's Union (UPL)	2	—	—	**2**	+1
Basque Citizen Initiative (ICV–Gorordo)	—	—	2	**2**	+2
Majorcan Union (UM)^{4}	—	2	—	**2**	+1
Valencian Union–Independents–Centrists (UV–FICVA–CCV)	1	—	—	**1**	−3
The Greens (LV)	—	1	—	**1**	+1
Independent Group of Ávila (AIAV)	1	—	—	**1**	+1
Independent Sorian Alternative (ALSI)	1	—	—	**1**	+1
Independent Popular Council of Formentera (AIPF)	—	1	—	**1**	+1
Democratic and Social Centre (CDS)	0	0	0	0	−32
Valencian People's Union–Nationalist Bloc (UPV–BN)	0	—	—	0	−1
Galician Nationalist Convergence (CNG)	0	—	—	0	−10
Independents of Ibiza and Formentera Federation (FIEF)	—	0	—	0	−1
Canarian Initiative (ICAN)^{5}	—	0	—	0	−1
People's Palentine Group (APP)	n/a	n/a	n/a	0	−1
Independents (INDEP)	1	0	0	**1**	±0
**Total**	**1,034**	**198**	**153**	**1,385**	**+2**
Sources
Footnotes: ^{1} Spanish Socialist Workers' Party results are compared to the combined totals of the Spanish Socialist Workers' Party and Basque Country Left in the 1991 elections.; ^{2} Canarian Coalition results are compared to the combined totals of Tenerife Group of Independents, Canarian Initiative (not including results in El Hierro), La Palma Group of Independents and Majorera Assembly in the 1991 elections.; ^{3} Socialist Party of Menorca–Nationalists of the Islands results are compared to Agreement of the Left of Menorca totals in the 1991 elections.; ^{4} Majorcan Union results are compared to Independent Union of Mallorca–Independents of Mallorca totals in the 1991 election.; ^{5} Canarian Initiative results are compared to Canarian Initiative totals in El Hierro in the 1991 elections.

==== Indirectly-elected ====
The following table lists party control in the indirectly-elected provincial deputations. Gains for a party are highlighted in that party's colour.

Province	Population	Previous control	New control
Albacete	358,626	Spanish Socialist Workers' Party (PSOE)	People's Party (PP)
Alicante	1,348,667	Spanish Socialist Workers' Party (PSOE)	People's Party (PP)
Almería	486,005	Spanish Socialist Workers' Party (PSOE)	People's Party (PP)
Ávila	176,910	People's Party (PP)	People's Party (PP)
Badajoz	671,774	Spanish Socialist Workers' Party (PSOE)	Spanish Socialist Workers' Party (PSOE)
Barcelona	4,743,797	Socialists' Party of Catalonia (PSC–PSOE)	Socialists' Party of Catalonia (PSC–PSOE)
Burgos	359,738	People's Party (PP)	People's Party (PP)
Cáceres	423,159	Spanish Socialist Workers' Party (PSOE)	Spanish Socialist Workers' Party (PSOE)
Cádiz	1,118,137	Spanish Socialist Workers' Party (PSOE)	Spanish Socialist Workers' Party (PSOE)
Castellón	461,701	Spanish Socialist Workers' Party (PSOE)	People's Party (PP)
Ciudad Real	488,699	Spanish Socialist Workers' Party (PSOE)	People's Party (PP)
Córdoba	779,333	Spanish Socialist Workers' Party (PSOE)	Spanish Socialist Workers' Party (PSOE)
Cuenca	207,175	Spanish Socialist Workers' Party (PSOE)	People's Party (PP)
Girona (Note: Renamed from Gerona in March 1992.)	536,317	Convergence and Union (CiU)	Convergence and Union (CiU)
Granada	833,526	Spanish Socialist Workers' Party (PSOE)	Spanish Socialist Workers' Party (PSOE)
Guadalajara	153,141	People's Party (PP)	People's Party (PP)
Huelva	454,995	Spanish Socialist Workers' Party (PSOE)	Spanish Socialist Workers' Party (PSOE)
Huesca	210,099	Spanish Socialist Workers' Party (PSOE)	People's Party (PP)
Jaén	663,586	Spanish Socialist Workers' Party (PSOE)	Spanish Socialist Workers' Party (PSOE)
La Coruña	1,131,404	Spanish Socialist Workers' Party (PSOE)	People's Party (PP)
León	531,913	Spanish Socialist Workers' Party (PSOE)	People's Party (PP)
Lleida (Note: Renamed from Lérida in March 1992.)	359,532	Convergence and Union (CiU)	Convergence and Union (CiU)
Lugo	387,038	People's Party (PP)	People's Party (PP)
Málaga	1,212,531	Spanish Socialist Workers' Party (PSOE)	People's Party (PP)
Orense	362,832	People's Party (PP)	People's Party (PP)
Palencia	186,184	People's Party (PP)	People's Party (PP)
Pontevedra	931,688	People's Party (PP)	People's Party (PP)
Salamanca	364,920	Independent (INDEP)	People's Party (PP)
Segovia	149,139	People's Party (PP)	People's Party (PP)
Seville	1,701,400	Spanish Socialist Workers' Party (PSOE)	Spanish Socialist Workers' Party (PSOE)
Soria	94,584	People's Party (PP)	People's Party (PP)
Tarragona	569,057	Convergence and Union (CiU)	Convergence and Union (CiU)
Teruel	143,198	People's Party (PP)	People's Party (PP)
Toledo	510,601	Spanish Socialist Workers' Party (PSOE)	People's Party (PP)
Valencia	2,188,459	Spanish Socialist Workers' Party (PSOE)	People's Party (PP)
Valladolid	505,208	People's Party (PP)	People's Party (PP)
Zamora	214,624	People's Party (PP)	People's Party (PP)
Zaragoza	850,888	Spanish Socialist Workers' Party (PSOE)	People's Party (PP)

==== Island councils ====
The following table lists party control in the island councils. Gains for a party are highlighted in that party's colour.

Island	Population	Previous control	New control
El Hierro	7,846	Spanish Socialist Workers' Party (PSOE)	Independent Herrenian Group (AHI)
Fuerteventura	41,477	Canarian Coalition (CC)	Independents of Fuerteventura (IF)
Gran Canaria	715,860	Canarian Coalition (CC)	People's Party (PP)
Ibiza–Formentera	88,143	People's Party (PP)	People's Party (PP)
La Gomera	16,812	Spanish Socialist Workers' Party (PSOE)	Spanish Socialist Workers' Party (PSOE)
La Palma	81,724	Spanish Socialist Workers' Party (PSOE)	Spanish Socialist Workers' Party (PSOE) (CC in 1996)
Lanzarote	75,110	Spanish Socialist Workers' Party (PSOE)	Lanzarote Independents Party (PIL) (PSOE in 1997)
Mallorca	622,447	People's Party (PP)	Majorcan Union (UM)
Menorca	68,027	People's Party (PP)	People's Party (PP)
Tenerife	669,271	Canarian Coalition (CC)	Canarian Coalition (CC)

==== Foral deputations ====
The following table lists party control in the foral deputations. Gains for a party are highlighted in that party's colour.

Province	Population	Previous control	New control
Álava	281,703	Basque Nationalist Party (EAJ/PNV)	Basque Nationalist Party (EAJ/PNV)
Biscay	1,164,772	Basque Nationalist Party (EAJ/PNV)	Basque Nationalist Party (EAJ/PNV)
Guipúzcoa	684,714	Basque Nationalist Party (EAJ/PNV)	Basque Nationalist Party (EAJ/PNV)

== Bibliography ==
- Constitución Española (Constitution). Official State Gazette (in Spanish). 27 December 1978 [version as of 28 August 1992]. BOE-A-1978-31229.
- Ley Orgánica 10/1982, de 10 de agosto, de Estatuto de Autonomía de Canarias (Organic Law 10/1982). Official State Gazette (in Spanish). 10 August 1982 [version as of 16 August 1982]. BOE-A-1982-20821.
- Ley Orgánica 2/1983, de 25 de febrero, de Estatuto de Autonomía para las islas Baleares (Organic Law 2/1983). Official State Gazette (in Spanish). 1 March 1983. BOE-A-1983-6316.
- Ley 27/1983, de 25 de noviembre, de Relaciones entre las Instituciones Comunes de la Comunidad Autónoma y los Órganos Forales de sus Territorios Históricos (Law 27/1983). Official State Gazette (in Spanish). 25 November 1983 [version as of 20 July 1993]. BOE-A-2012-5193.
- Ley 7/1985, de 2 de abril, Reguladora de las Bases del Régimen Local (Law 7/1985). Official State Gazette (in Spanish). 2 April 1985 [version as of 31 December 1994]. BOE-A-1985-5392.
- Ley Orgánica 5/1985, de 19 de junio, del Régimen Electoral General (Organic Law 5/1985). Official State Gazette (in Spanish). 19 June 1985 [version as of 24 March 1995]. BOE-A-1985-11672.
- Ley 8/1986, de 26 de noviembre, Electoral de la Comunidad Autónoma de las Islas Baleares (Law 8/1986). Official State Gazette (in Spanish). 26 November 1986 [version as of 25 March 1995]. BOE-A-1987-2903.
- Ley 1/1987, de 27 de marzo, de Elecciones para las Juntas Generales de los Territorios Históricos de Araba, Bizkaia y Gipuzkoa (Law 1/1987). Official State Gazette (in Spanish). 27 March 1987 [version as of 10 April 1987]. BOE-A-2012-3948.
- Ley 5/1989, de 13 de abril, de Consells Insulares (Law 5/1989). Official State Gazette (in Spanish). 13 April 1989. BOE-A-1989-16895.
- Ley 14/1990, de 26 de julio, de Régimen Jurídico de las Administraciones Públicas de Canarias (Law 14/1990). Official State Gazette (in Spanish). 26 July 1990. BOE-A-1990-23140.
- Ley 2/1992, de 28 de febrero, por la que pasan a denominarse oficialmente Girona y Lleida las provincias de Gerona y Lérida (Law 2/1992). Official State Gazette (in Spanish). 28 February 1992. BOE-A-1992-4904.
- Real Decreto 489/1995, de 3 de abril, de convocatoria de elecciones locales y a las Asambleas de Ceuta y Melilla (Royal Decree 489/1995). Official State Gazette (in Spanish). 3 April 1995. BOE-A-1995-8132.
- Real Decreto 1495/1995, de 11 de septiembre, por el que se convocan elecciones locales parciales (Royal Decree 1495/1995). Official State Gazette (in Spanish). 11 September 1995. BOE-A-1995-20662.
