= We Are Lanzarote =

We Are Lanzarote Somos Lanzarote
- Leader: Collective leadership
- Founded: 1 April 2015
- Merger of: Citizen Alternative 25th of May; Canarian Nationalist Alternative; Democratic Alternative of Haría; Canarian Green Party; Partido Vecinal
- Headquarters: C/ Trillo, nº 20, Arrecife, Lanzarote, Canary Islands
- Ideology: Participative democracy Canarian nationalism Ecologism; Feminism
- Political position: Left-wing
- Island council of Lanzarote: 2 / 23
- Town councillors: 9 / 121

Website
- somoslanzarote.org

We Are Lanzarote Spanish: Somos Lanzarote, Somos is a left-wing Canarian and ecologist political party, born in 2015 after a process of confluence between various parties in the Canarian island of Lanzarote.

== History ==
Somos run for the local and insular elections of 2015, gaining 2 seats in the Cabildo of Lanzarote and 9 local councillors, including 3 in Arrecife (the capital of the island).
