= 1995 Spanish local elections in La Rioja =

This article presents the results breakdown of the local elections held in La Rioja on 28 May 1995. The following tables show detailed results in the autonomous community's most populous municipalities, sorted alphabetically.

== City control ==
The following table lists party control in the most populous municipalities, including provincial capitals (highlighted in bold). Gains for a party are highlighted in that party's colour.

Municipality	Population	Previous control	New control
**Logroño**	124,823	Spanish Socialist Workers' Party (PSOE)	People's Party (PP)

== Municipalities ==
=== Logroño ===
Population: 124,823

← Summary of the 28 May 1995 City Council of Logroño election results →
Parties and alliances	Popular vote			Seats	
Parties and alliances	Votes	%	±pp	Total	+/−
People's Party (PP)	36,080	50.95	+9.28	**15**	+2
Spanish Socialist Workers' Party (PSOE)	23,375	33.01	−7.92	**10**	−2
United Left (IU)	6,001	8.47	+2.50	**2**	+1
Riojan Party (PR)	3,159	4.46	+1.14	0	±0
Riojan Alternative (AR)	937	1.32	New	0	±0
Democratic and Social Centre (CDS)	n/a	n/a	−6.19	0	−1
Blank ballots	1,266	1.79	−0.12		
**Total**	**70,818**			**27**	**±0**
Valid votes	70,818	99.49	+0.29		
Invalid votes	361	0.51	−0.29		
**Votes cast / turnout**	**71,179**	**71.09**	**+10.53**		
Abstentions	28,952	28.91	−10.53		
**Registered voters**	**100,131**				

== See also ==
- 1995 Riojan regional election
