= 1991 Spanish local elections in La Rioja =

This article presents the results breakdown of the local elections held in La Rioja on 26 May 1991. The following tables show detailed results in the autonomous community's most populous municipalities, sorted alphabetically.

== City control ==
The following table lists party control in the most populous municipalities, including provincial capitals (highlighted in bold). Gains for a party are highlighted in that party's colour.

Municipality	Population	Previous control	New control
**Logroño**	121,911	Spanish Socialist Workers' Party (PSOE)	Spanish Socialist Workers' Party (PSOE)

== Municipalities ==
=== Logroño ===
Population: 121,911

← Summary of the 26 May 1991 City Council of Logroño election results →
Parties and alliances	Popular vote			Seats	
Parties and alliances	Votes	%	±pp	Total	+/−
People's Party (PP)^{1}	23,406	41.67	+7.27	**13**	+3
Spanish Socialist Workers' Party (PSOE)	22,989	40.93	−1.92	**12**	−1
Democratic and Social Centre (CDS)	3,479	6.19	−5.65	**1**	−2
United Left (IU)	3,355	5.97	+3.82	**1**	+1
Riojan Party (PR)	1,867	3.32	−1.91	0	−1
Blank ballots	1,075	1.91	+0.40		
**Total**	**56,171**			**27**	**±0**
Valid votes	56,171	99.20	+0.79		
Invalid votes	453	0.80	−0.79		
**Votes cast / turnout**	**56,624**	**60.56**	**−7.57**		
Abstentions	36,880	39.44	+7.57		
**Registered voters**	**93,504**				
Sources
Footnotes: ^{1} People's Party results are compared to the combined totals of People's Alliance and People's Democratic Party in the 1987 election.

== See also ==
- 1991 Riojan regional election
