= Robres del Castillo =

- Municipality
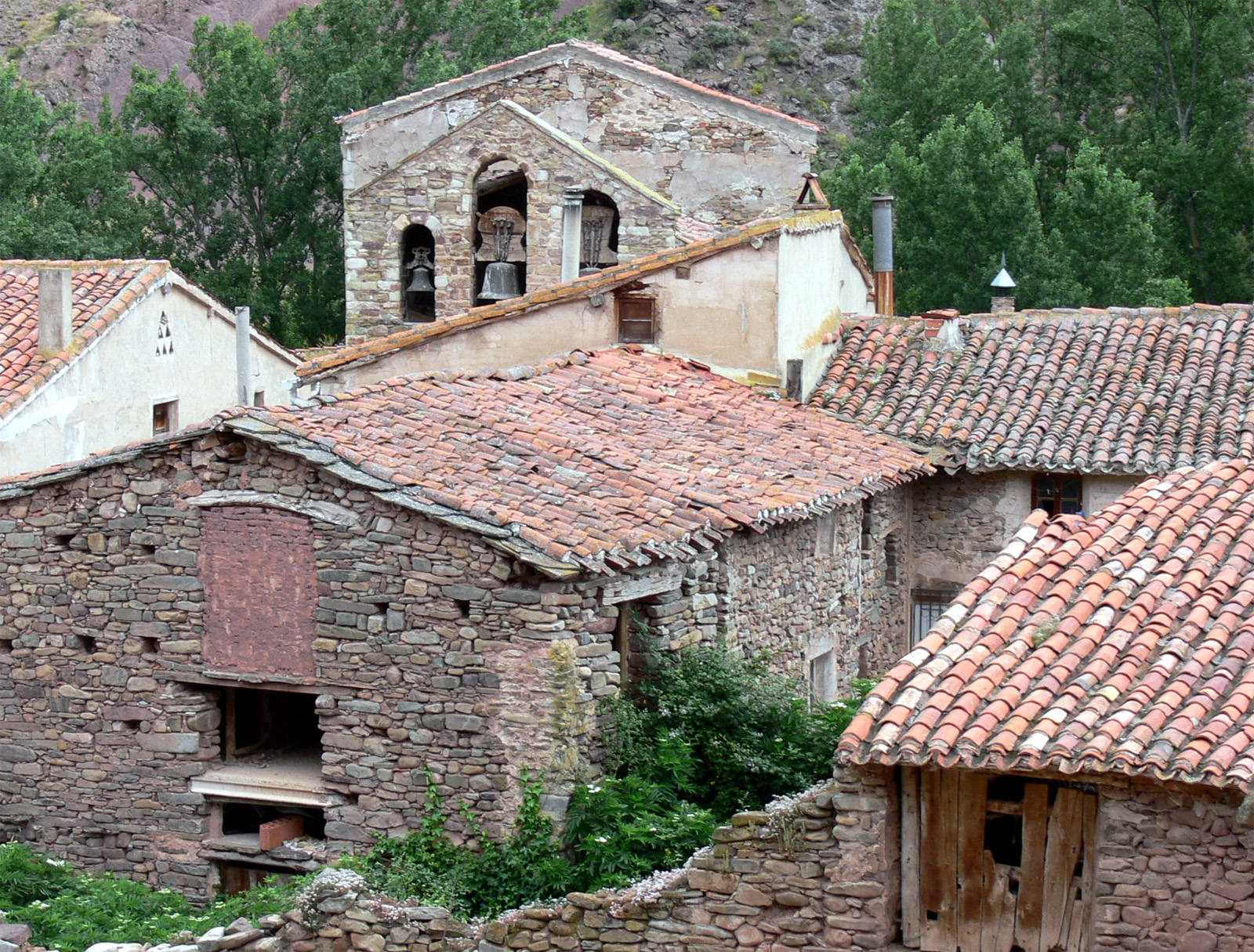
- View of Robres del Castillo

- Location within La Rioja, Spain Location within Spain
- Coordinates: 42°16′25″N 2°17′30″W
- Country: Spain
- Autonomous community: La Rioja
- Comarca: Logroño

Government
  - Mayor: Ricardo García Barrio (PP)

Area
  - Total: 35.88 km^{2} (13.85 sq mi)
- Elevation: 727 m (2,385 ft)

Population (2025-01-01)
  - Total: 21
- Demonym(s): robreño, ña
- Postal code: 26131
- Website: Official website

Robres del Castillo is a village in the province and autonomous community of La Rioja, Spain. The municipality covers an area of 35.88 square kilometres (13.85 sq mi) and as of 2011 had a population of 30 people.

== Politics ==
List of mayors since the democratic elections of 1979
| Term | Mayor | Political party |
|---|---|---|
| 1979–1983 | Cirilo Oliván San Miguel | UCD |
| 1983–1987 | Cirilo Oliván San Miguel | AP |
| 1987–1991 | María Jesús Barrio Galilea | Independent |
| 1991–1995 | María Jesús Barrio Galilea | Independent |
| 1995–1999 | María Jesús Barrio Galilea | Independent |
| 1999–2003 | Victoriano Martínez Martínez | PP |
| 2003–2007 | Victoriano Martínez Martínez | PP |
| 2007–2011 | Juan José Aguado Villamuza | PP |
| 2011–2015 | Juan José Aguado Villamuza | PP |
| 2015–2019 | Ricardo García Barrio | PP |
| 2019–2023 | n/d | n/d |
| 2023– | n/d | n/d |
