= 1999 Spanish local elections in La Rioja =

This article presents the results breakdown of the local elections held in La Rioja on 13 June 1999. The following tables show detailed results in the autonomous community's most populous municipalities, sorted alphabetically.

== City control ==
The following table lists party control in the most populous municipalities, including provincial capitals (highlighted in bold). Gains for a party are highlighted in that party's colour.

Municipality	Population	Previous control	New control
**Logroño**	125,617	People's Party (PP)	People's Party (PP)

== Municipalities ==
=== Logroño ===
Population: 125,617

← Summary of the 13 June 1999 City Council of Logroño election results →
Parties and alliances	Popular vote			Seats	
Parties and alliances	Votes	%	±pp	Total	+/−
People's Party (PP)	33,401	51.96	+1.01	**15**	±0
Spanish Socialist Workers' Party (PSOE)	21,321	33.17	+0.16	**10**	±0
United Left (IU)	3,588	5.58	−2.89	**1**	−1
Riojan Party (PR)	3,381	5.26	+0.80	**1**	+1
Movement to Humanist Socialism (MASH)	241	0.37	New	0	±0
Humanist Party (PH)	194	0.30	New	0	±0
Blank ballots	2,154	3.35	+1.56		
**Total**	**64,280**			**27**	**±0**
Valid votes	64,280	99.27	−0.22		
Invalid votes	472	0.73	+0.22		
**Votes cast / turnout**	**64,752**	**60.67**	**−10.42**		
Abstentions	41,971	39.33	+10.42		
**Registered voters**	**106,723**				

== See also ==
- 1999 Riojan regional election
