= 1987 Spanish local elections in La Rioja =

This article presents the results breakdown of the local elections held in La Rioja on 10 June 1987. The following tables show detailed results in the autonomous community's most populous municipalities, sorted alphabetically.

== City control ==
The following table lists party control in the most populous municipalities, including provincial capitals (highlighted in bold). Gains for a party are highlighted in that party's colour.

Municipality	Population	Previous control	New control
**Logroño**	115,622	Spanish Socialist Workers' Party (PSOE)	Spanish Socialist Workers' Party (PSOE)

== Municipalities ==
=== Logroño ===
Population: 115,622

← Summary of the 10 June 1987 City Council of Logroño election results →
Parties and alliances	Popular vote			Seats	
Parties and alliances	Votes	%	±pp	Total	+/−
Spanish Socialist Workers' Party (PSOE)	24,826	42.85	−6.03	**13**	−2
People's Alliance (AP)^{1}	18,868	32.57	−7.81	**10**	−2
Democratic and Social Centre (CDS)	6,859	11.84	+8.82	**3**	+3
Progressive Riojan Party (PRP)	3,032	5.23	+1.17	**1**	+1
United Left (IU)^{2}	1,243	2.15	−0.43	0	±0
People's Democratic Party (PDP)	1,058	1.83	New	0	±0
Workers' Party of Spain–Communist Unity (PTE–UC)	1,038	1.79	New	0	±0
Humanist Platform (PH)	138	0.24	New	0	±0
Blank ballots	872	1.51	+1.51		
**Total**	**57,934**			**27**	**±0**
Valid votes	57,934	98.41	−1.59		
Invalid votes	936	1.59	+1.59		
**Votes cast / turnout**	**58,870**	**68.13**	**+5.25**		
Abstentions	27,544	31.87	−5.25		
**Registered voters**	**86,414**				
Sources
Footnotes: ^{1} People's Alliance results are compared to People's Coalition totals in the 1983 election.; ^{2} United Left results are compared to Communist Party of Spain totals in the 1983 election.

== See also ==
- 1987 Riojan regional election
