= Canarian Nationalist Alternative =

Canarian Nationalist Alternative Alternativa Nacionalista Canaria
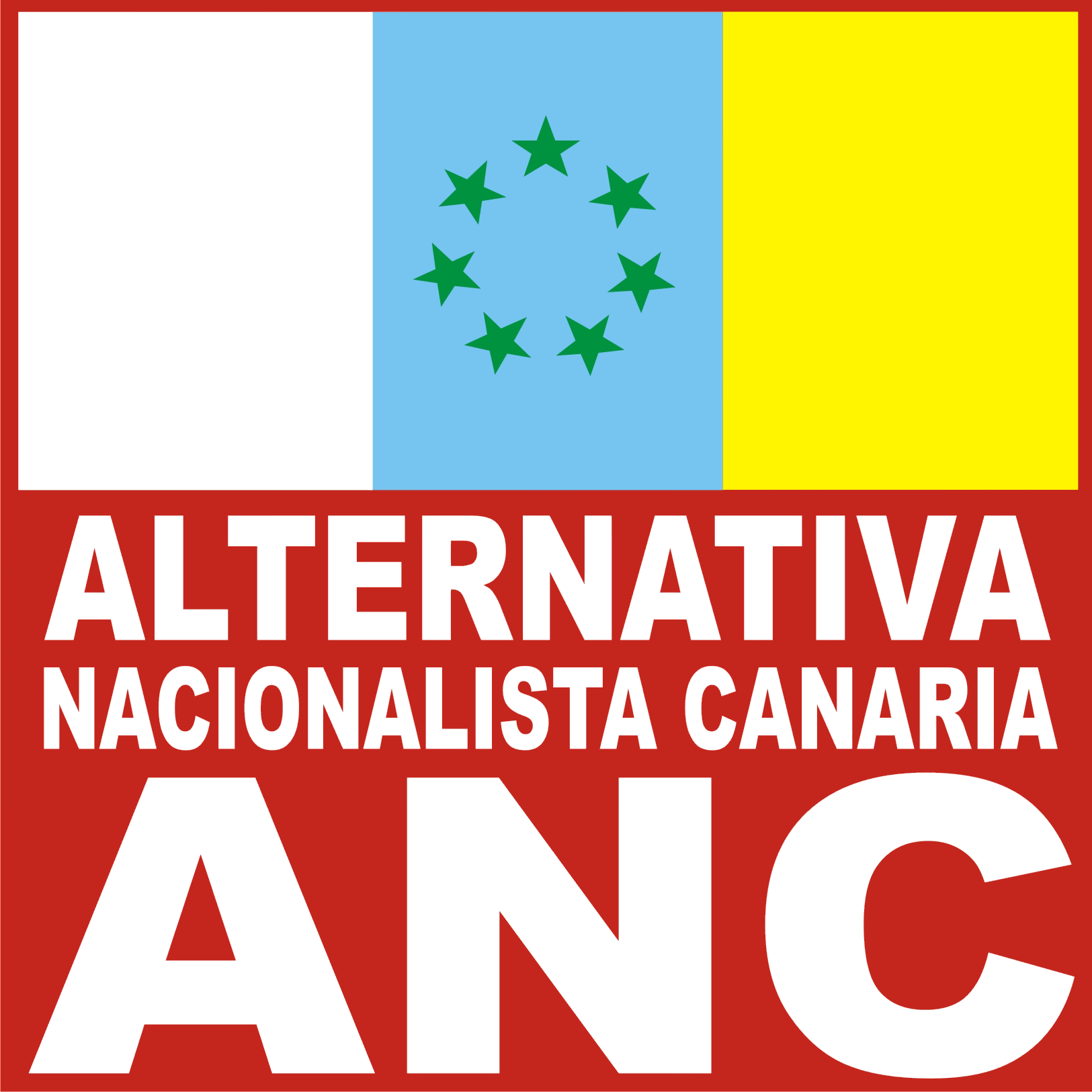
- Founded: 2006
- Split from: Canarian Popular Alternative
- Ideology: Canarian nationalism Canarian independentism Socialism; Ecologism; Feminism; Anticolonialism
- Political position: Left-wing
- National affiliation: Ahora Repúblicas
- Regional affiliation: Ahora Canarias

Website
- alternativanacionalistacanaria.org

Canarian Nationalist Alternative (Spanish: Alternativa Nacionalista Canaria, ANC) is a Canarian left-wing nationalist political party, born in 2006 after a split of the Canarian Popular Alternative (APC).

== Objectives ==
The ANC seeks independence for the Canary Islands and building a more just and equitable economic and social order, based in socialism. The party also defends environmental sustainability, renewable energy and feminism.

== History ==
The party was formed in 2006 by militants of the APC, that were against their integration into Alternativa Sí se puede por Tenerife, and some members of the Canarian Nationalist Party. In 2007 the ANC presented lists to the municipal and Canarian elections. The party gained 2500 votes in the autonomic elections, and 1100 votes in the local ones, obtaining 4 town councillors.

In 2011, the ANC experienced some growth. In the regional elections of that year the party gained 6400 votes and 7,000 votes in local elections, presenting lists in almost every island. Despite this increase the party failed to gain any town councillors. In the general election the ANC obtained 3100 votes.

In the 2014 European elections the ANC supported The Peoples Decide list. In the 2015 local elections ANC joined Somos in the island of Lanzarote.
