= Canarian Popular Alternative =

People's Alternative for the Canary Islands Alternativa Popular Canaria
- Founded: 2002
- Ideology: Canarian nationalism Socialism; Ecologism
- Political position: Left-wing
- International affiliation: None

Website
- alternativanacionalistacanaria.org

Alternativa Popular Canaria (APC, Spanish: People's Alternative for the Canary Islands) is a Canarian nationalist leftist party founded in 2002, and part of the Movimiento de Liberación Nacional Canario (MLNC, Canarian National Liberation Movement). Its creation was spurred by the youth organisation Azarug and several municipal parties, as well as members of various leftist nationalist parties.

ASAVA, a municipal party which stood for Valsequillo in Gran Canaria, and the leftist independence party Unidad del Pueblo, while not members of APC, have collaborated with that party in certain matters.

== History ==
In the municipal elections of 2003, APC gained a council seat in the municipality of Santa Úrsula (Tenerife). In La Orotava they ran as Iniciativa por La Orotava (IPO, Initiative for La Orotava) along with Los Verdes de Canarias, obtaining five council seats. In the European Parliament elections of June 2004, APC backed Europe of the Peoples. The party held its second National Assembly 25–26 June 2005, and its third on 16 September 2006. In 2006 a split within the party in Tenerife produced the offshoot Canarian Nationalist Alternative.

APT participated in the 2007 Canarian Parliament elections, in coalition with the Alternativa Ciudadana 25 de Mayo (Citizen Alternative May 25), but failed to gain any seats. In the 2007 Spanish municipal elections they lost their seat in Santa Úrsula (the local branch having split from the party) but won three seats in La Orotava.

The Cabildo of Tenerife, as well as the municipalities of Santa Cruz de Tenerife, San Cristobal de La Laguna, Granadilla de Abona, Buenavista del Norte and Tacoronte, supported Alternativa Sí Se Puede por Tenerife (Alternative Yes We Can for Tenerife), a political option into which APC was integrated. In the 2009 European Parliament elections, the APC backed Iniciativa Internacionalista, an far-left Spanish coalition.

In its fourth National Assembly, APC decided not to stand in any further elections, remaining instead within the Alternativa Sí Se Puede por Tenerife. Since APC does not condemn the past violent policies of MPAIAC, it is viewed by local rightist and pro-Spanish parties as one of the groups that seek to minimize terrorism in the Canary Islands.

== See also ==
- Canarian nationalism
- Azarug
