= Independents of Fuerteventura =

Political party in Spain

Independents of Fuerteventura Independientes de Fuerteventura
- Founded: 1983 (as group); 17 May 1984 (as party)
- Headquarters: C/ Juan XXIII, 70, 35600 Puerto del Rosario (Las Palmas)
- Ideology: Canarian nationalism

Independents of Fuerteventura (Spanish: Independientes de Fuerteventura, IF) is a political force in Fuerteventura (Canary Islands) which first contested the 1983 elections and that was formally registered as a party on 17 May 1984.
