= Cabildo insular =

Institution charged with local government and administration in Spain

Location of the Canary Islands in relation to Spain

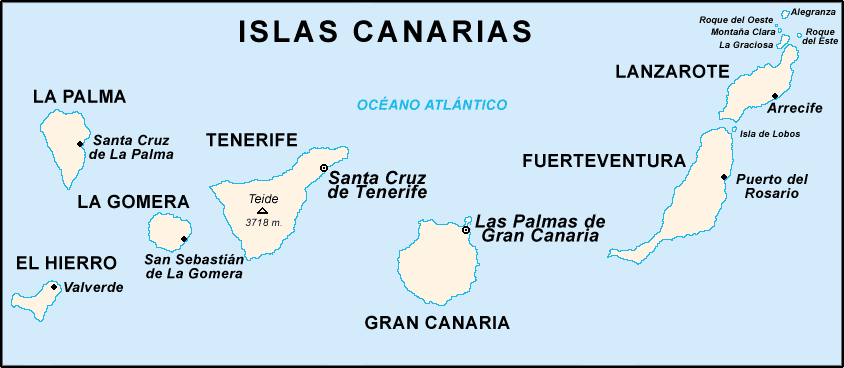
Map of the Canary Islands

A cabildo insular (Spanish pronunciation: [kaˈβildo‿insuˈlaɾ]; lit. 'island council') is the government and administrative institution of each of the seven major islands in the Canary Islands archipelago: Tenerife, Fuerteventura, Gran Canaria, Lanzarote, La Palma, La Gomera and El Hierro. The island of La Graciosa falls under the jurisdiction of the cabildo of Lanzarote.

The members of a cabildo are elected by direct universal suffrage by the Spanish citizens of each island. The membership is determined by party-list proportional representation. In Francoist Spain the members were appointed rather than elected.

Originally created under the Law of Cabildos of 1912, by 1925 the cabildos insulares had taken over powers ascribed to the provincial councils. Cabildos exercise a level of authority between those of their province and their autonomous communities in matters of health, environment, culture, sports, industry, roads, drinking water and irrigation, hunting and fishing licensing, museums, beaches, public transportation and land organization. Cabildos can impose fuel taxes.

== List of cabildos insulares ==
There are seven cabildos: El Hierro, Fuerteventura, Gran Canaria, La Gomera, La Palma, Lanzarote, and Tenerife.

Cabildo	Island(s)	Image
Cabildo de El Hierro	El Hierro	
Cabildo de Fuerteventura	Fuerteventura	
Cabildo de Gran Canaria	Gran Canaria	
Cabildo de Lanzarote	Lanzarote, La Graciosa	
Cabildo de La Gomera	La Gomera	
Cabildo de La Palma	La Palma	
Cabildo de Tenerife	Tenerife	

== See also ==
- Cabildo de Tenerife
- Cabildo (council)
- Local government in Spain

== Bibliography ==
- Hernández Bravo de Laguna, Juan (2014). "Los Cabildos Insulares en la Constitución y el Estatuto ¿transformación o continuidad?". XX Coloquio de Historia Canario-Americana (in Spanish). Las Palmas de Gran Canaria: Cabildo de Gran Canaria. p. 788.
