= Opinion polling for the 2019 Spanish local elections (Canary Islands) =

In the run up to the 2019 Spanish local elections, various organisations carried out opinion polling to gauge voting intention in local entities in Spain. Results of such polls for municipalities and island cabildos in the Canary Islands are displayed in this article. The date range for these opinion polls is from the previous local elections, held on 24 May 2015, to the day the next elections were held, on 26 May 2019.

Polls are listed in reverse chronological order, showing the most recent first and using the dates when the survey fieldwork was done, as opposed to the date of publication. Where the fieldwork dates are unknown, the date of publication is given instead. The highest percentage figure in each polling survey is displayed with its background shaded in the leading party's colour. If a tie ensues, this is applied to the figures with the highest percentages. The "Lead" columns on the right shows the percentage-point difference between the parties with the highest percentages in a given poll.

== Municipalities ==
=== Arrecife ===
Color key:

Exit poll

Polling firm/Commissioner	Fieldwork date	Sample size	Turnout	PSOE	CCa	PP	SL	LAVA	Podemos	Cs	NCa	Vox	Lead
2019 municipal election	26 May 2019	—N/a	44.7	17.2; 5	28.5; 9	17.2; 6	6.2; 2	2.6; 0	9.1; 3	4.6; 0	(Note: Within Somos Lanzarote.)	2.5; 0	11.3
GfK/FORTA	26 May 2019	?	?	22.1; 6/7	24.4; 7/8	16.5; 4/5	5.9; 0/1	–	8.5; 2/3	10.7; 2/3		–	2.3
TSA/Lanzarote Media	5–17 Apr 2019	342	49.5	24.9; 6/7	18.8; 4/5	10.5; 2/3	? 3/4	5.2; 0/1	? 2/3	10.2; 2/3		? 0	6.1
Infortécnica/Lancelot Medios	8 Apr 2019	?	?	? 5/6	? 5/6	26.9; 6/7	? 1/2	? 1/2	? 1/2	? 1/2		–	?
2015 municipal election	24 May 2015	—N/a	46.3	19.6; 6	17.3; 5	15.3; 5	10.0; 3	8.9 (Note: Results for PIL.); 2	8.9 (Note: Results for GL.); 2	6.0; 2	4.9; 0	–	2.3

=== Las Palmas de Gran Canaria ===
Color key:

Exit poll

Polling firm/Commissioner	Fieldwork date	Sample size	Turnout	PP	PSOE	Podemos	Cs	NCa	UxGC	IUC	CCa	Vox	Unidas Podemos	PACMA	Lead
2019 municipal election	26 May 2019	—N/a	50.7	22.2; 7	31.7; 11	(Note: Within Unidas Podemos.)	9.5; 3	9.5; 3	(Note: Within CCa.)		8.4; 2	3.2; 0	10.4; 3	1.3; 0	9.5
GfK/FORTA	26 May 2019	?	?	18.2; 5/6	32.6; 10/12		11.8; 3/4	9.5; 2/3			7.2; 2/3	–	10.6; 3/4	3.3; 0/1	14.4
TSA/Canarias7	29 Apr–14 May 2019	?	64	13.9; 4/5	22.4; 7/8		13.6; 4/5	13.6; 3/4			14.2; 4/5	4.8; 0	14.0; 4/5	–	8.2
Infocom/CC	12–21 Jun 2018	?	?	17.9; 6	29.4; 9	12.3; 4	16.9; 5	7.6; 3		–	10.9; 3	–	–	–	11.5
TSA/Canarias7	16 Apr 2018	?	?	19.2; 6/7	23.4; 8/9	15.2; 5/6	12.3; 4/5	12.8; 4/5	5.1; 1/2	–	4.6; 0	–	–	–	4.2
2015 municipal election	24 May 2015	—N/a	57.0	28.8; 10	19.7; 7	16.1 (Note: Results for LPGC Puede.); 6	7.7; 2	7.5; 2	5.6; 2	3.5 (Note: Results for Canarias Decide.); 0	3.2; 0	0.4; 0	–	–	9.1

=== Puerto del Rosario ===
Color key:

Exit poll

Polling firm/Commissioner	Fieldwork date	Sample size	Turnout	CCa	PSOE	PP	NCa	AMF	IUC	GF	Podemos	Cs	Vox	AEPR	Lead
2019 municipal election	26 May 2019	—N/a	52.7	17.4; 4	19.9; 5	13.5; 3	9.8; 2	(Note: Within NCa.)	–	5.0; 1	7.6; 2	7.9; 2	3.7; 0	7.9; 2	2.5
GfK/FORTA	26 May 2019	?	?	16.8; 4/5	23.3; 6/7	13.9; 3/4	6.6; 1/2		–	5.4; 0/1	15.5; 3/4	7.1; 1/2	3.7; 0/1	–	6.5
2015 municipal election	24 May 2015	—N/a	56.6	27.8; 7	19.0; 4	15.4; 4	8.8; 2	8.4; 2	6.1; 1	5.2 (Note: Results for PPMAJO.); 1	–	–	–	–	8.8

=== San Cristóbal de La Laguna ===
Color key:

Exit poll

Polling firm/Commissioner	Fieldwork date	Sample size	Turnout	CCa	Unidas Podemos	PSOE	PP	NCa	Cs	Avante	Vox	Lead
2019 municipal election	26 May 2019	—N/a	55.6	27.7; 9	17.0; 5	23.9; 7	7.8; 2	2.3; 0	7.1; 2	8.8; 2	2.3; 0	3.8
GfK/FORTA	26 May 2019	?	?	23.9; 7/8	20.2; 5/6	20.7; 6/7	11.4; 3/4	–	7.3; 1/2	7.2; 1/2	–	3.2
TSA/Canarias7	29 Apr–14 May 2019	?	?	20.2; 6/7	16.8; 5/6	23.0; 6/7	8.1; 2/3	5.0; 0/1	7.1; 2	9.3; 3	2.3; 0	2.8
SEC	3 Jun 2018	1,000	?	29.0– 30.0; 8	14.0– 15.0; 4	22.0– 23.0; 6	11.0– 12.0; 3	4.0– 5.0; 1	17.0– 19.0; 5	–	–	7.0
TSA/Canarias7	17 Apr 2018	?	?	21.6; 6/7	17.1; 5	22.0; 6/7	11.0; 3	7.9; 2	15.2; 4/5	–	–	0.4
2015 municipal election	24 May 2015	—N/a	58.1	23.9; 7	18.5; 6	18.1; 5	15.2; 4	9.6; 3	7.2; 2	–	–	5.4

=== Santa Cruz de Tenerife ===
Color key:

Exit poll

Polling firm/Commissioner	Fieldwork date	Sample size	Turnout	CCa	PP	PSOE	SSP	Cs	IUC	Vox	Unidas Podemos	NCa	Lead
2019 municipal election	26 May 2019	—N/a	53.4	30.8; 10	9.7; 3	26.4; 9	4.4; 0	8.4; 2		3.1; 0	10.6; 3	1.7; 0	4.4
GfK/FORTA	26 May 2019	?	?	29.1; 8/10	8.6; 2/3	26.1; 7/8	10.3; 2/3	8.8; 2/3		–	8.2; 2/3	–	3.0
TSA/Canarias7	29 Apr–14 May 2019	?	?	23.9; 7/9	9.8; 3/4	22.5; 7/9	7.6; 2/3	9.1; 3/4		3.9; 0	10.4; 3/4	5.8; 1/2	1.4
IADC	29 Apr–4 May 2019	700	53–56	28.0– 29.0; 11/12	11.0– 12.0; 3/4	16.0– 17.0; 5/6	8.0– 9.0; 2/3	11.0– 12.0; 3/4		–	5.0– 6.0; 1/2	–	12.0
TSA/Canarias7	16 Apr 2018	?	?	25.8; 7/8	12.1; 3/4	18.7; 5/6	15.2; 4/5	12.5; 3/4	5.3; 1	–	–	–	7.1
2015 municipal election	24 May 2015	—N/a	55.1	24.3; 9	17.5; 6	13.2; 4	12.1; 4	9.5; 3	5.1; 1	0.5; 0	–	–	6.8

=== Telde ===
Color key:

Exit poll

Polling firm/Commissioner	Fieldwork date	Sample size	Turnout	NCa	+xT	UxGC	PSOE	PP	CCa	Podemos	CCD	Cs	CIUCA	Unidas Podemos	Vox	Lead
2019 municipal election	26 May 2019	—N/a	54.2	24.3; 8	7.1; 2		20.2; 6	7.2; 2	12.2; 4			4.1; 0	10.4; 3	6.8; 2	2.0; 0	4.1
GfK/FORTA	26 May 2019	?	?	26.3; 8/9	7.2; 1/2		22.1; 6/7	8.8; 2/3	11.0; 3/4			6.1; 1/2	–	7.1; 1/2	–	4.2
TSA/Canarias7	29 Apr–14 May 2019	?	?	22.5; 7/8	11.9; 3/4		16.8; 5/6	8.4; 2/3	12.2; 4			5.6; 1/2	8.6; 2/3	7.2; 2	3.1; 0	5.7
TSA/Canarias7	17 Apr 2018	?	?	23.4; 7/8	11.1; 3	11.7; 3/4	14.7; 4/5	10.7; 3	5.6; 1	7.5; 2	3.9; 0	6.2; 2	(Note: Within UxGC.)	–	–	8.7
2015 municipal election	24 May 2015	—N/a	61.9	20.7; 7	13.5; 4	12.6; 4	11.5; 4	8.7; 3	8.2; 2	7.3 (Note: Results for SPGT.); 2	5.3; 1	3.6; 0		–	–	7.2

== Island Cabildos ==
=== El Hierro ===
Color key:

Exit poll

Polling firm/Commissioner	Fieldwork date	Sample size	Turnout	AHI	PSOE	PP	Podemos	NCa	AEPEH	Lead
2019 island council election	26 May 2019	—N/a	75.3	20.9; 3	26.9; 4	10.2; 1	7.5; 1	2.8; 0	24.0; 4	2.9
GfK/FORTA	26 May 2019	?	?	20.9; 3/4	28.3; 4/5	19.2; 2/3	–	5.0; 0/1	15.0; 2/3	7.4
2015 island council election	24 May 2015	—N/a	74.8	45.1; 6	24.9; 3	13.6; 2	6.7; 1	6.6; 1	–	20.2

=== Fuerteventura ===
Color key:

Exit poll

Polling firm/Commissioner	Fieldwork date	Sample size	Turnout	CCa	PSOE	PP	Podemos	GF	NCa	Cs	Lead
2019 island council election	26 May 2019	—N/a	56.7	25.4; 7	23.1; 7	14.2; 4	7.0; 2	4.7; 0	10.8; 3	4.8; 0	2.3
GfK/FORTA	26 May 2019	?	?	25.5; 7/8	25.5; 6/7	11.2; 2/3	14.0; 3/4	–	6.3; 1/2	5.5; 1/2	Tie
TSA/Canarias7	29 Apr–14 May 2019	?	?	22.7; 6/7	22.2; 5/6	9.0; 2	12.9; 3/4	5.3; 1	11.5; 3	9.5; 2	0.5
2015 island council election	24 May 2015	—N/a	59.4	30.6; 9	17.6; 5	11.9; 3	10.6; 3	8.3; 2	5.8; 1	2.9; 0	13.0

=== Gran Canaria ===
Color key:

Exit poll

Polling firm/Commissioner	Fieldwork date	Sample size	Turnout	NCa	PP	PSOE	Podemos	UxGC	CCa	Cs	IUC	Vox	Lead
2019 island council election	26 May 2019	—N/a	56.2	25.7; 8	17.8; 6	24.5; 8	7.2; 2		10.7; 3	6.9; 2	0.6; 0	2.5; 0	1.2
GfK/FORTA	26 May 2019	?	?	20.0; 6/7	16.6; 5/6	27.8; 8/10	10.5; 3/4		9.1; 2/3	8.2; 2/3	–	–	7.8
Hamalgama Métrica/La Provincia	5–17 May 2019	?	?	25.1; 7/8	14.2; 4	23.7; 7	12.4; 3/4		15.1; 4/5	7.1; 2	–	1.3; 0	1.4
TSA/Canarias7	29 Apr–14 May 2019	?	?	26.5; 8/9	11.9; 3/4	17.5; 5/6	12.3; 3/4		12.0; 3/4	9.1; 2/3	–	4.6; 0	9.0
Infocom/CC	12–21 Jun 2018	1,201	?	27.5; 9	12.5; 4	17.4; 5/6	10.7; 3		14.7; 4/5	10.8; 3	–	–	10.1
TSA/Canarias7	19 Feb–31 Mar 2018	796	?	28.9; 10	12.3; 4	17.8; 6	10.9; 3/4	7.8; 2	5.1; 0/1	11.2; 3/4	–	–	11.1
Hamalgama Métrica/La Provincia	10–25 Aug 2017	?	?	26.2; 8/9	20.9; 6/7	17.7; 5/6	12.1; 3/4	8.5; 2/3	6.6; 1/2	5.4; 1	1.5; 0	–	5.3
2015 island council election	24 May 2015	—N/a	61.6	26.5; 9	17.5; 6	14.5; 5	13.4; 4	11.3; 4	5.6; 1	4.3; 0	1.5; 0	0.3; 0	9.1

=== La Gomera ===
Color key:

Exit poll

Polling firm/Commissioner	Fieldwork date	Sample size	Turnout	ASG	PSOE	PP	SSP	NCa	CCa	Lead
2019 island council election	26 May 2019	—N/a	76.1	57.5; 11	14.8; 3	4.5; 0	12.8; 2	4.2; 0	5.6; 1	42.7
GfK/FORTA	26 May 2019	?	?	54.4; 10/12	15.5; 2/3	3.7; 0/1	9.2; 1/2	5.7; 0/1	8.6; 1/2	38.9
2015 island council election	24 May 2015	—N/a	77.0	50.2; 10	15.3; 3	9.3; 1	9.2; 1	9.0; 1	6.3; 1	34.9

=== La Palma ===
Color key:

Exit poll

Polling firm/Commissioner	Fieldwork date	Sample size	Turnout	PSOE	CCa	PP	Podemos	NCa	Lead
2019 island council election	26 May 2019	—N/a	68.1	29.2; 7	29.9; 8	25.5; 6	3.6; 0	3.5; 0	0.7
GfK/FORTA	26 May 2019	?	?	29.0; 7/8	30.0; 7/8	21.8; 5/6	3.7; 0/1	3.3; 0/1	1.0
2015 island council election	24 May 2015	—N/a	66.7	31.4; 8	29.4; 7	22.9; 5	5.0; 1	2.7; 0	2.0

=== Lanzarote ===
Color key:

Exit poll

Polling firm/Commissioner	Fieldwork date	Sample size	Turnout	CCa	PSOE	Podemos	PP	SL	LAVA	NCa	Cs	Vox	Lead
2019 island council election	26 May 2019	—N/a	51.9	27.7; 8	28.3; 9	7.6; 2	13.8; 4	4.7; 0	4.6; 0		4.9; 0	2.4; 0	0.6
GfK/FORTA	26 May 2019	?	?	28.3; 7/8	29.8; 8/9	7.5; 1/2	12.8; 3/4	3.5; 0/1	–		7.4; 1/2	–	1.5
TSA/Canarias7	29 Apr–14 May 2019	?	?	19.8; 5/6	24.4; 6/7	13.5; 3/4	10.4; 2/3	13.2; 3/4	5.1; 0/1		9.8; 2/3	–	4.6
Infortécnica/Lancelot Medios	8 Apr 2019	400	?	26.1; 7	24.6; 6	? 2	? 3/4	? 0/1	? 1		? 1	? 0/1	1.5
2015 island council election	24 May 2015	—N/a	52.5	24.2; 7	19.1; 5	12.5; 3	12.0; 3	6.9; 2	6.7; 1	6.6; 1	5.3; 1	–	5.1

=== Tenerife ===
Color key:

Exit poll

Polling firm/Commissioner	Fieldwork date	Sample size	Turnout	CCa	PSOE	PP	Podemos	Cs	IUC	NCa	Vox	ASTf	Lead
2019 island council election	26 May 2019	—N/a	58.4	31.1; 11	30.8; 11	12.6; 4	9.4; 3	6.3; 2	1.1; 0	1.9; 0	2.2; 0	0.4; 0	0.3
GfK/FORTA	26 May 2019	?	?	29.4; 9/11	32.8; 11/13	10.6; 3/4	12.2; 3/4	7.5; 2/3	–	–	–	–	3.4
Hamalgama Métrica/El Día	5–17 May 2019	?	?	25.2; 8/9	24.1; 8/9	16.4; 5	13.7; 4	8.6; 2/3	–	3.0; 0	–	5.2; 0/1	1.1
TSA/Canarias7	29 Apr–14 May 2019	?	?	26.7; 9/10	24.9; 8/9	10.9; 3/4	15.9; 5/6	8.2; 2/3	–	4.2; 0	3.8; 0	–	1.8
Perfiles/CC	16–20 Apr 2018	710	?	30.0– 31.0; 10/11	22.0– 23.0; 7/8	13.0– 14.0; 4/5	11.0– 12.0; 3/4	10.0– 11.0; 3/4	–	3.0– 4.0; 0	–	–	8.0
TSA/Canarias7	19 Feb–31 Mar 2018	792	?	25.8; 8/9	22.5; 7/8	17.2; 5/6	13.9; 4/5	10.3; 3	–	4.5; 0	–	–	3.3
Hamalgama Métrica/La Provincia	10–25 Aug 2017	?	?	24.3; 8	23.3; 7/8	24.0; 7/8	? 4	? 2	–	–	–	–	0.3
2015 island council election	24 May 2015	—N/a	60.5	28.6; 10	20.6; 7	19.4; 6	13.9; 5	5.5; 1	2.7; 0	2.2; 0	–	–	8.0
