= 2019 Canarian island council elections =

Elections in the Spanish region of the Canary Islands

Island council elections were held in the Canary Islands on 26 May 2019 to elect the 11th Island Councils (the cabildos insulares) of El Hierro, Fuerteventura, Gran Canaria, La Gomera, La Palma, Lanzarote and Tenerife. All 157 seats in the seven island councils were up for election. They were held concurrently with regional elections in twelve autonomous communities (including the Canary Islands) and local elections all across Spain.

== Overall ==
← Summary of the 26 May 2019 Canarian island council election results →
Parties and alliances	Popular vote			Seats	
Parties and alliances	Votes	%	±pp	Total	+/−
Spanish Socialist Workers' Party (PSOE)	247,434	27.48	+9.23	49	+13
Canarian Coalition–PNC–United for Gran Canaria (CCa–PNC–UxGC)	196,827	21.86	−1.44	41	−4
Canarian Coalition–PNC–United for Gran Canaria (CCa–PNC–UxGC)^{1}	195,506	21.71	−1.29	38	−1
Independent Herrenian Group (AHI)	1,321	0.15	−0.15	3	−3
People's Party (PP)	138,217	15.35	−2.59	25	−1
New Canaries–Broad Front (NC–FA)^{2}	110,316	12.25	−1.38	11	−4
Yes We Can Canaries (Podemos–SSP–Equo)^{3}	70,941	7.88	−4.97	10	−7
Citizens–Party of the Citizenry (Cs)	54,981	6.11	+1.44	4	+2
Vox (Vox)	20,742	2.30	+2.19	0	±0
Animalist Party Against Mistreatment of Animals (PACMA)	9,585	1.06	New	0	±0
Canarian United Left (IUC)^{4}	7,831	0.87	−1.19	0	±0
Gomera Socialist Group (ASG)	6,969	0.77	+0.12	11	+1
Canaries Now (ANC–UP)^{5}	2,868	0.32	−0.32	0	±0
More for Gran Canaria (Más por Gran Canaria)^{6}	2,761	0.31	−0.03	0	±0
The Greens–Green Group (LV–GV)	2,685	0.30	New	0	±0
Lanzarote Advances (LAVA)^{7}	2,239	0.25	−0.09	0	−1
Win Fuerteventura (PPMAJO–UP Majorero)^{8}	1,725	0.19	−0.13	0	−2
Tenerife Socialist Group (ASTf)	1,624	0.18	New	0	±0
Yes We Can (SSP)	1,555	0.17	+0.05	2	+1
For El Hierro Electoral Group (AEPEH)	1,513	0.17	New	4	+4
Nivaria (Nivaria)	1,185	0.13	New	0	±0
Fuerteventura Party (PF)	1,185	0.13	New	0	±0
With You, We Are Democracy (Contigo)	1,116	0.12	New	0	±0
Communist Party of the Canarian People (PCPC)	1,022	0.11	+0.01	0	±0
United for Lanzarote (UPLanzarote)	713	0.08	New	0	±0
For a Fairer World (PUM+J)	686	0.08	New	0	±0
Democratic Union of the Canary Islands (UDC)	633	0.07	New	0	±0
Roque de Gando (RDG)	521	0.06	New	0	±0
Let's Vote Fuerteventura (Votemos)	486	0.05	New	0	±0
Everyone for Lanzarote (TPL)	434	0.05	New	0	±0
Vote For Yourself (Vótate)	417	0.05	New	0	±0
Seniors in Action (3e en acción)	408	0.05	New	0	±0
Canaries for Progress (Ci–Progreso)	321	0.04	New	0	±0
Frontera Union (UF)	320	0.04	New	0	±0
Lanzarote Neighbourhood Force (FVL)	316	0.04	New	0	±0
Villages of Benahoare (PdB)	152	0.02	New	0	±0
Union of Independent Citizens (UCIN)	36	0.00	New	0	±0
Blank ballots	9,635	1.07	−0.55		
Total	900,399			157	+2
Valid votes	900,399	99.18	+1.19		
Invalid votes	7,462	0.82	−1.19		
Votes cast / turnout	907,861	57.69	−3.30		
Abstentions	665,787	42.31	+3.30		
Registered voters	1,573,648				
Sources
Footnotes: ^{1} Canarian Coalition–PNC–United for Gran Canaria results are compared to the combined totals of Canarian Coalition–Canarian Nationalist Party and United for Gran Canaria in the 2015 elections.; ^{2} New Canaries–Broad Front results are compared to the combined totals of New Canaries, We Are Lanzarote and Municipal Assemblies of Fuerteventura in the 2015 elections.; ^{3} Yes We Can Canaries results are compared to We Can totals in the 2015 elections.; ^{4} Canarian United Left results are compared to Canaries Decides totals in the 2015 elections.; ^{5} Canaries Now results are compared to Canarian Nationalist Alternative totals in the 2015 elections.; ^{6} More for Gran Canaria results are compared to More for Telde totals in the 2015 elections.; ^{7} Lanzarote Advances results are compared to Lanzarote Independents Party totals in the 2015 elections.; ^{8} Win Fuerteventura results are compared to Majorero Progressive Party totals in the 2015 elections.

Popular vote
PSOE	27.48%
CCa–PNC–UxGC	21.86%
PP	15.35%
NC–FA	12.25%
SPC	7.88%
Cs	6.11%
Vox	2.30%
PACMA	1.06%
ASG	0.77%
SSP	0.17%
AEPEH	0.17%
Others	4.29%
Blank ballots	1.07%

Seats
PSOE	31.21%
CCa–PNC–UxGC	26.11%
PP	15.92%
NC–FA	7.01%
ASG	7.01%
SPC	6.37%
Cs	2.55%
AEPEH	2.55%
SSP	1.27%

== Island control ==
The following table lists party control in the island councils. Gains for a party are highlighted in that party's colour.

Island	Population	Previous control	New control
El Hierro	10,798	Independent Herrenian Group (AHI)	Spanish Socialist Workers' Party (PSOE)
Fuerteventura	113,275	Canarian Coalition–Canarian Nationalist Party (CCa–PNC)	Spanish Socialist Workers' Party (PSOE) (AMF in 2021)
Gran Canaria	846,717	New Canaries (NCa)	New Canaries (NCa)
La Gomera	21,136	Gomera Socialist Group (ASG)	Gomera Socialist Group (ASG)
La Palma	81,863	Spanish Socialist Workers' Party (PSOE)	Canarian Coalition–Canarian Nationalist Party (CCa–PNC) (PP in 2019)
Lanzarote	149,183	Canarian Coalition–Canarian Nationalist Party (CCa–PNC)	Spanish Socialist Workers' Party (PSOE)
Tenerife	904,713	Canarian Coalition–Canarian Nationalist Party (CCa–PNC)	Canarian Coalition–Canarian Nationalist Party (CCa–PNC) (PSOE in 2019)

== Islands ==
=== El Hierro ===
← Summary of the 26 May 2019 Island Council of El Hierro election results →
Parties and alliances	Popular vote			Seats	
Parties and alliances	Votes	%	±pp	Total	+/−
Spanish Socialist Workers' Party (PSOE)	1,695	26.85	+1.92	4	+1
For El Hierro Electoral Group (AEPEH)	1,513	23.97	New	4	+4
Independent Herrenian Group–Canarian Coalition (AHI–CCa)	1,321	20.93	−24.14	3	−3
People's Party (PP)	645	10.22	−3.43	1	−1
El Hierro Can–Canarian United Left (Puede.IUC)^{1}	472	7.48	−1.26	1	±0
Frontera Union (UF)	320	5.07	New	0	±0
New Canaries–Broad Front (NC–FA)	179	2.84	−3.80	0	−1
Citizens–Party of the Citizenry (Cs)	95	1.51	New	0	±0
Union of Independent Citizens (UCIN)	36	0.57	New	0	±0
Blank ballots	36	0.57	−0.40		
Total	6,312			13	±0
Valid votes	6,312	99.31	+1.17		
Invalid votes	44	0.69	−1.17		
Votes cast / turnout	6,356	75.25	+0.46		
Abstentions	2,090	24.75	−0.46		
Registered voters	8,446				
Sources
Footnotes: ^{1} El Hierro Can–Canarian United Left results are compared to the combined totals of We Can and Canaries Decides in the 2015 election.

=== Fuerteventura ===
← Summary of the 26 May 2019 Island Council of Fuerteventura election results →
Parties and alliances	Popular vote			Seats	
Parties and alliances	Votes	%	±pp	Total	+/−
Canarian Coalition–Canarian Nationalist Party (CCa–PNC)	9,321	25.37	−5.23	7	−2
Spanish Socialist Workers' Party (PSOE)	8,482	23.08	+5.50	7	+2
People's Party (PP)	5,200	14.15	+2.26	4	+1
New Canaries–Broad Front–Municipal Assemblies of Fuerteventura (NC–AMF)^{1}	3,983	10.84	+0.29	3	+2
Yes We Can Canaries (Podemos–Equo–SSP)^{2}	2,567	6.99	−3.64	2	−1
Citizens–Party of the Citizenry (Cs)	1,769	4.81	+1.88	0	±0
Win Fuerteventura (PPMAJO–UP Majorero)^{3}	1,725	4.69	−3.58	0	−2
Fuerteventura Party (PF)	1,185	3.22	New	0	±0
Vox (Vox)	1,044	2.84	New	0	±0
Let's Vote Fuerteventura (Votemos)	486	1.32	New	0	±0
With You, We Are Democracy (Contigo)	461	1.25	New	0	±0
Blank ballots	522	1.42	−0.17		
Total	36,745			23	±0
Valid votes	36,745	98.22	+0.82		
Invalid votes	665	1.78	−0.82		
Votes cast / turnout	37,410	56.69	−2.75		
Abstentions	28,585	43.31	+2.75		
Registered voters	65,995				
Sources
Footnotes: ^{1} New Canaries–Broad Front–Municipal Assemblies of Fuerteventura results are compared to the combined totals of New Canaries–Broad Front–Independents of Fuerteventura and Municipal Assemblies of Fuerteventura in the 2015 election.; ^{2} Yes We Can Canaries results are compared to We Can totals in the 2015 election.; ^{3} Win Fuerteventura results are compared to Majorero Progressive Party totals in the 2015 election.

=== Gran Canaria ===
← Summary of the 26 May 2019 Island Council of Gran Canaria election results →
Parties and alliances	Popular vote			Seats	
Parties and alliances	Votes	%	±pp	Total	+/−
New Canaries–Broad Front (NC–FA)	94,576	25.74	−0.73	8	−1
Spanish Socialist Workers' Party (PSOE)	90,133	24.53	+9.98	8	+3
People's Party (PP)	65,490	17.82	+0.29	6	±0
Canarian Coalition–United for Gran Canaria (CC–UxGC)^{1}	39,243	10.68	−6.20	3	−2
Yes We Can Canaries (Podemos–Equo–SSP)^{2}	26,415	7.19	−6.20	2	−2
Citizens–Party of the Citizenry (Cs)	25,474	6.93	+2.60	2	+2
Vox (Vox)	9,127	2.48	+2.22	0	±0
Animalist Party Against Mistreatment of Animals (PACMA)	4,261	1.16	New	0	±0
More for Gran Canaria (Más por Gran Canaria)^{3}	2,761	0.75	−0.03	0	±0
Canarian United Left (IUC)^{4}	2,219	0.60	−0.86	0	±0
Canaries Now (ANC–UP)^{5}	1,471	0.40	+0.19	0	±0
For a Fairer World (PUM+J)	686	0.19	New	0	±0
Communist Party of the Canarian People (PCPC)	587	0.16	New	0	±0
Roque de Gando (RDG)	521	0.14	New	0	±0
Vote For Yourself (Vótate)	417	0.11	New	0	±0
With You, We Are Democracy (Contigo)	309	0.08	New	0	±0
Blank ballots	3,805	1.04	−0.36		
Total	367,495			29	±0
Valid votes	367,495	99.18	+0.68		
Invalid votes	3,045	0.82	−0.68		
Votes cast / turnout	370,540	56.21	−5.44		
Abstentions	288,635	43.79	+5.44		
Registered voters	659,175				
Sources
Footnotes: ^{1} Canarian Coalition–United for Gran Canaria results are compared to the combined totals of United for Gran Canaria and Canarian Coalition–Canarian Nationalist Party in the 2015 election.; ^{2} Yes We Can Canaries results are compared to We Can totals in the 2015 election.; ^{3} More for Gran Canaria results are compared to More for Telde totals in the 2015 election.; ^{4} Canarian United Left results are compared to Canaries Decides totals in the 2015 election.; ^{5} Canaries Now results are compared to Canarian Nationalist Alternative totals in the 2015 election.

=== La Gomera ===
← Summary of the 26 May 2019 Island Council of La Gomera election results →
Parties and alliances	Popular vote			Seats	
Parties and alliances	Votes	%	±pp	Total	+/−
Gomera Socialist Group (ASG)	6,969	57.48	+7.29	11	+1
Spanish Socialist Workers' Party (PSOE)	1,799	14.84	−0.42	3	±0
Yes We Can (SSP)	1,555	12.82	+3.63	2	+1
Canarian Coalition–Canarian Nationalist Party (CCa–PNC)	673	5.55	−0.70	1	±0
People's Party (PP)	541	4.46	−3.84	0	−1
New Canaries (NCa)	508	4.19	−4.81	0	−1
Blank ballots	80	0.66	+0.10		
Total	12,125			17	±0
Valid votes	12,125	99.21	+0.79		
Invalid votes	96	0.79	−0.79		
Votes cast / turnout	12,221	76.14	−0.82		
Abstentions	3,829	23.86	+0.82		
Registered voters	16,050				

=== La Palma ===
← Summary of the 26 May 2019 Island Council of La Palma election results →
Parties and alliances	Popular vote			Seats	
Parties and alliances	Votes	%	±pp	Total	+/−
Canarian Coalition–Canarian Nationalist Party (CCa–PNC)	12,824	29.90	+0.47	8	+1
Spanish Socialist Workers' Party (PSOE)	12,519	29.19	−2.26	7	−1
People's Party (PP)	10,928	25.48	+2.54	6	+1
Yes We Can Canaries (Podemos–Equo–SSP)^{1}	1,557	3.63	−1.41	0	−1
New Canaries–Broad Front (NC–FA)	1,495	3.49	+0.78	0	±0
Citizens–Party of the Citizenry (Cs)	1,034	2.41	−0.54	0	±0
Canarian United Left (IUC)^{2}	896	2.09	−0.83	0	±0
Vox (Vox)	717	1.67	New	0	±0
Canaries for Progress (Ci–Progreso)	321	0.75	New	0	±0
Villages of Benahoare (PdB)	152	0.35	New	0	±0
Blank ballots	442	1.03	−0.46		
Total	42,885			21	±0
Valid votes	42,885	98.73	+1.07		
Invalid votes	552	1.27	−1.07		
Votes cast / turnout	43,437	68.09	+1.42		
Abstentions	20,353	31.91	−1.42		
Registered voters	63,790				
Sources
Footnotes: ^{1} Yes We Can Canaries results are compared to We Can totals in the 2015 election.; ^{2} Canarian United Left results are compared to Canaries Decides totals in the 2015 election.

=== Lanzarote ===
← Summary of the 26 May 2019 Island Council of Lanzarote election results →
Parties and alliances	Popular vote			Seats	
Parties and alliances	Votes	%	±pp	Total	+/−
Spanish Socialist Workers' Party (PSOE)	13,905	28.27	+9.14	9	+4
Canarian Coalition–Canarian Nationalist Party (CCa–PNC)	13,635	27.72	+3.50	8	+1
People's Party (PP)	6,784	13.79	+1.82	4	+1
Stand Up Lanzarote–Yes We Can (Podemos–Equo–SSP)^{1}	3,714	7.55	−4.94	2	−1
Citizens–Party of the Citizenry (Cs)	2,394	4.87	−0.46	0	−1
We Are Lanzarote–New Canaries–Broad Front (SomosLan–NC)^{2}	2,336	4.75	−8.70	0	−3
Lanzarote Advances (LAVA)^{3}	2,239	4.55	−2.13	0	−1
Vox (Vox)	1,177	2.39	New	0	±0
United for Lanzarote (UPLanzarote)	713	1.45	New	0	±0
Canarian United Left (IUC)^{4}	641	1.30	−0.66	0	±0
Everyone for Lanzarote (TPL)	434	0.88	New	0	±0
Lanzarote Neighbourhood Force (FVL)	316	0.64	New	0	±0
Canaries Now (ANC–UP)	124	0.25	New	0	±0
With You, We Are Democracy (Contigo)	46	0.09	New	0	±0
Blank ballots	734	1.49	−0.82		
Total	49,192			23	±0
Valid votes	49,192	99.11	+0.82		
Invalid votes	441	0.89	−0.82		
Votes cast / turnout	49,633	51.85	−0.63		
Abstentions	46,082	48.15	+0.63		
Registered voters	95,715				
Sources
Footnotes: ^{1} Stand Up Lanzarote–Yes We Can results are compared to We Can totals in the 2015 election.; ^{2} We Are Lanzarote–New Canaries–Broad Front results are compared to the combined totals of We Are Lanzarote and New Canaries–Broad Front in the 2015 election.; ^{3} Lanzarote Advances results are compared to Lanzarote Independents Party totals in the 2015 election.; ^{4} Canarian United Left results are compared to Canaries Decides totals in the 2015 election.

=== Tenerife ===
← Summary of the 26 May 2019 Island Council of Tenerife election results →
Parties and alliances	Popular vote			Seats	
Parties and alliances	Votes	%	±pp	Total	+/−
Canarian Coalition–Canarian Nationalist Party (CCa–PNC)	119,810	31.07	+2.45	11	+1
Spanish Socialist Workers' Party (PSOE)	118,901	30.83	+10.28	11	+4
People's Party (PP)	48,629	12.61	−6.81	4	−2
Yes We Can Canaries (Podemos–Equo–SSP)^{1}	36,216	9.39	−4.50	3	−2
Citizens–Party of the Citizenry (Cs)	24,215	6.28	+0.76	2	+1
Vox (Vox)	8,677	2.25	New	0	±0
New Canaries–Broad Front (NC–FA)	7,239	1.88	−0.30	0	±0
Animalist Party Against Mistreatment of Animals (PACMA)	5,324	1.38	New	0	±0
Canarian United Left (IUC)^{2}	4,075	1.06	−1.67	0	±0
The Greens–Green Group (LV–GV)	2,685	0.70	New	0	±0
Tenerife Socialist Group (ASTf)	1,624	0.42	New	0	±0
Canaries Now (ANC–UP)^{3}	1,273	0.33	−0.80	0	±0
Nivaria (Nivaria)	1,185	0.31	New	0	±0
Democratic Union of the Canary Islands (UDC)	633	0.16	New	0	±0
Communist Party of the Canarian People (PCPC)	435	0.11	−0.14	0	±0
Seniors in Action (3e en acción)	408	0.11	New	0	±0
With You, We Are Democracy (Contigo)	300	0.08	New	0	±0
Blank ballots	4,016	1.04	−0.78		
Total	385,645			31	+2
Valid votes	385,645	99.33	+1.82		
Invalid votes	2,619	0.67	−1.82		
Votes cast / turnout	388,264	58.43	−2.10		
Abstentions	276,213	41.57	+2.10		
Registered voters	664,477				
Sources
Footnotes: ^{1} Yes We Can Canaries results are compared to We Can totals in the 2015 election.; ^{2} Canarian United Left results are compared to Canaries Decides totals in the 2015 election.; ^{3} Canaries Now results are compared to Canarian Nationalist Alternative totals in the 2015 election.
