= 2019 Spanish local elections =

- 26 May 2019 (Note: By-elections were held on 17 November 2019 in those constituencies where results were annulled by a final sentence following an electoral petition, or where elections were not held due to a lack of candidates.)

All 66,979 councillors in 8,131 municipal councils (Note: Including 50 seats in the assemblies of Ceuta and Melilla.) All 1,424 provincial/island seats in 44 provinces (Note: Including: 1,038 seats in 38 provincial deputations; 157 seats in 7 Canarian island cabildos; 153 seats in 3 Basque foral deputations; 76 seats in 4 Balearic island councils.)
- Opinion polls
- Registered: 35,275,287 ▲0.5%
- Turnout: 22,996,370 (65.2%) ▲0.3 pp
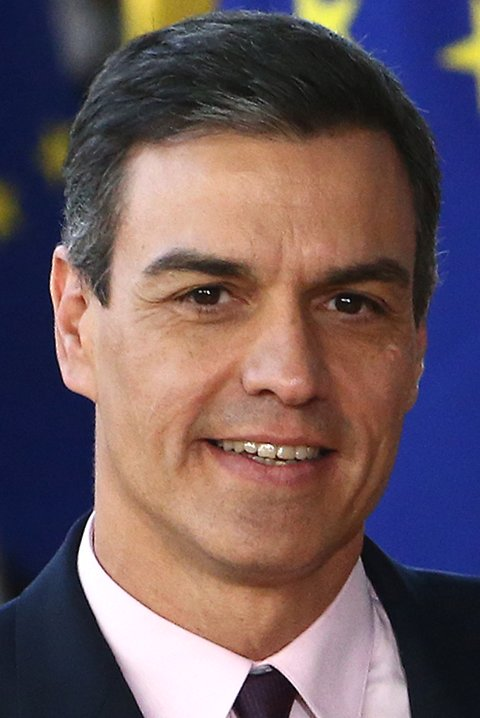

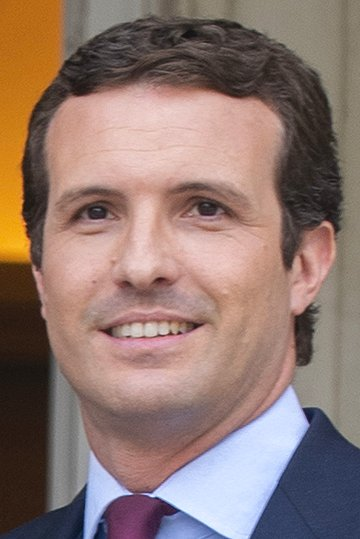

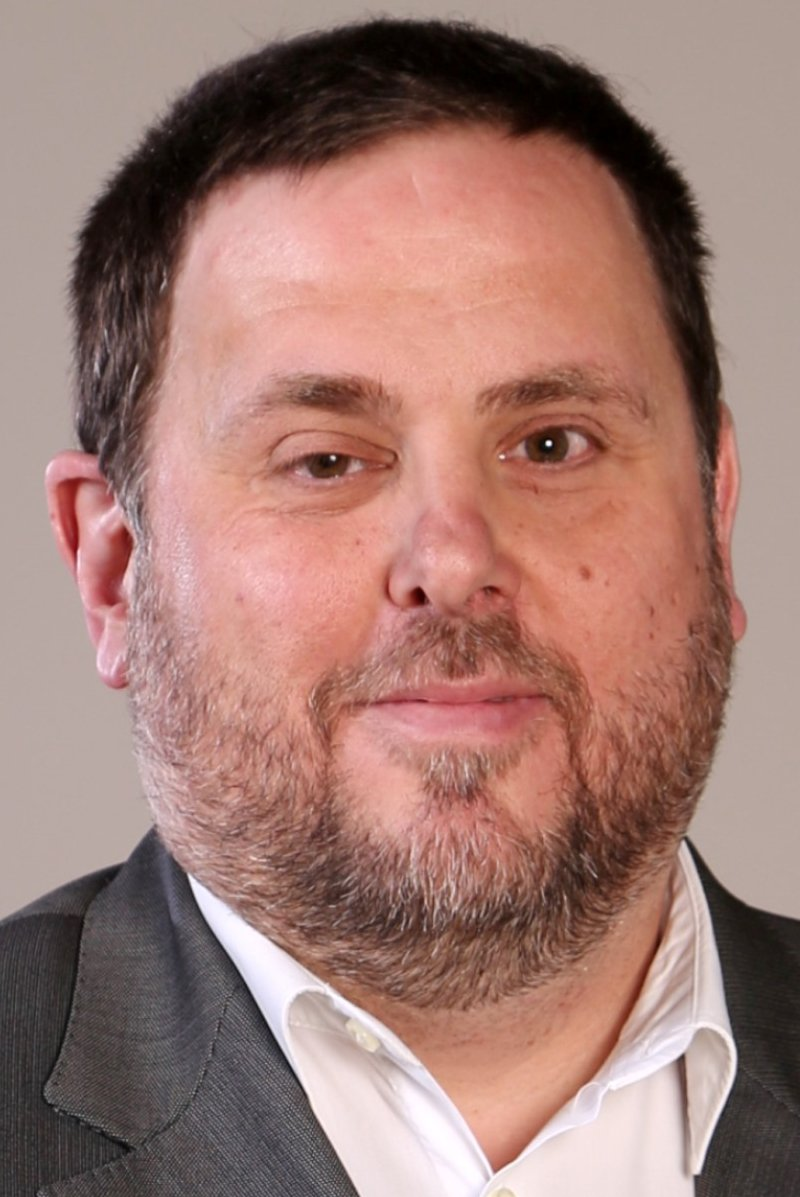

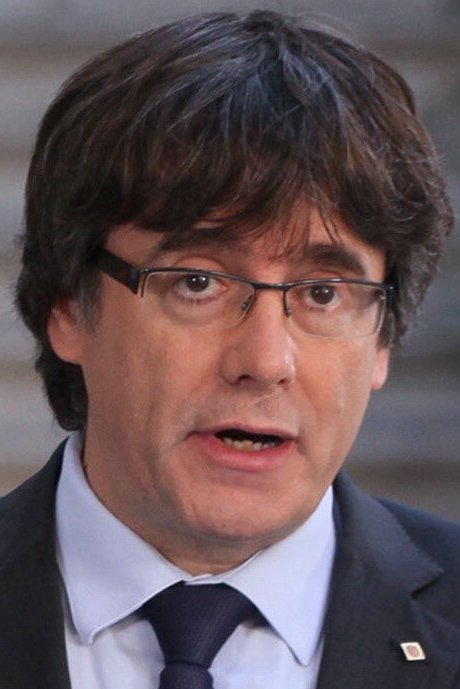

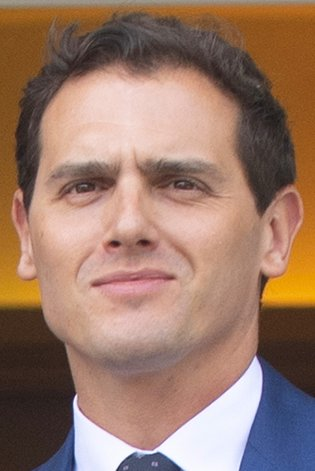

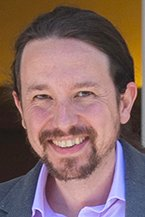
| | First party | Second party | Third party |
|---|---|---|---|
| Leader | Pedro Sánchez | Pablo Casado | Oriol Junqueras |
| Party | PSOE | PP | ERC–AM |
| Leader since | 18 June 2017 | 21 July 2018 | 17 September 2011 |
| Last election | 20,858 c., 25.0% 464 p. | 22,721 c., 27.0% (Note: Results for PP in the 2015 elections, not including Navarre and Formentera.); 479 p. | 2,387 c., 2.3% 32 p. |
| Seats won | 22,341 c. 548 p. | 20,376 c. 411 p. | 3,125 c. 47 p. |
| Seat change | ▲1,483 c. ▲84 p. | ▼2,345 c. ▼68 p. | ▲738 c. ▲15 p. |
| Popular vote | 6,695,553 | 5,162,031 | 829,005 |
| Percentage | 29.4% | 22.7% | 3.6% |
| Swing | ▲4.4 pp | ▼4.3 pp | ▲1.3 pp |
| | Fourth party | Fifth party | Sixth party |
| Leader | Carles Puigdemont | Albert Rivera | Pablo Iglesias |
| Party | JxCat–Junts | Cs | Unidas Podemos |
| Leader since | 13 November 2017 | 9 July 2006 | 15 November 2014 |
| Last election | 3,336 c., 3.0% (Note: Results for CiU in the 2015 elections.); 51 p. | 1,516 c., 6.5% (Note: Results for C's in the 2015 elections, not including Formentera.); 41 p. | 3,651 c., 12.2% (Note: Results for IU (6.4%, 2,833 c. and 41 p.), Podemos (5.7%, 799 c. and 71 p.) and Equo (0.1%, 19 c. and 1 p.) in the 2015 elections, not including Ahora Madrid results.); 113 p. |
| Seats won | 2,804 c. 35 p. | 2,793 c. 61 p. | 2,667 c. 70 p. |
| Seat change | ▼532 c. ▼16 p. | ▲1,277 c. ▲20 p. | ▼984 c. ▼43 p. |
| Popular vote | 558,508 | 2,089,018 | 2,014,934 |
| Percentage | 2.5% | 9.2% | 8.8% |
| Swing | ▼0.5 pp | ▲2.7 pp | ▼2.4 pp |
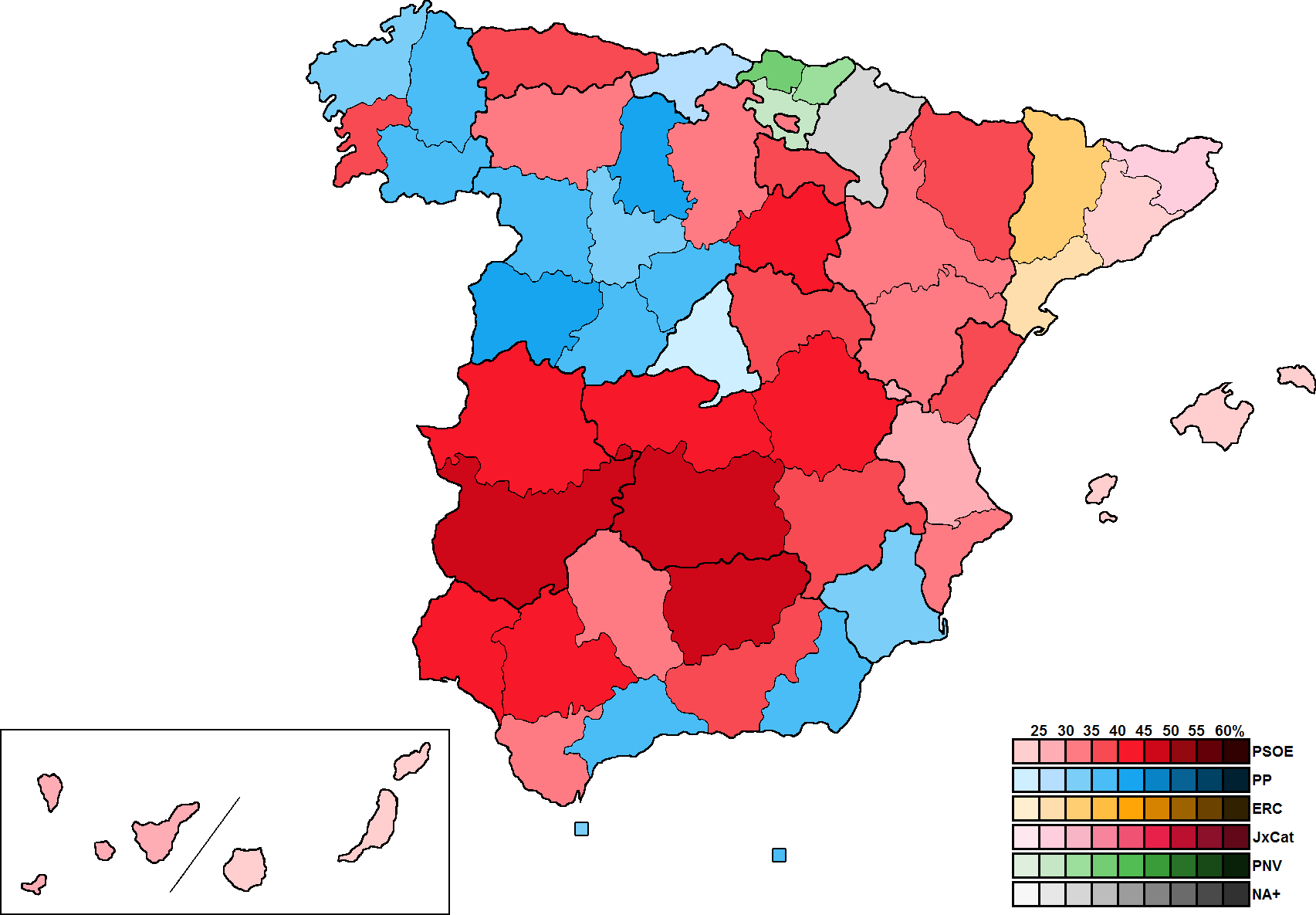
- Provincial results map for municipal elections

Local elections were held in Spain on 26 May 2019 to elect all 66,979 councillors in the 8,131 Spanish municipalities (including 50 seats in the assemblies of the autonomous cities of Ceuta and Melilla), all 1,191 provincial seats in 41 provinces (including 38 indirectly-elected provincial deputations and the three foral deputations in the Basque Country) and 233 seats in ten island councils (seven Canarian and four Balearic ones). They were held concurrently with regional elections in twelve autonomous communities, as well as the 2019 European Parliament election.

The Spanish Socialist Workers' Party (PSOE), invigorated from its general election win the previous month, emerged as the largest political party in the elections overall for the first time since 2007, scoring first place in the popular vote for the first time since 2003 and achieving its largest margin of victory over the People's Party (PP) since the 1991 elections. Conversely, the PP scored its worst result in local elections in Spain since the People's Alliance result in 1987, but managed to hold out against a surging Citizens (Cs), which secured disappointing results after falling barely one percentage point short of overcoming the PP in the April general election. The alliance of Podemos and United Left (IU), Unidas Podemos, lost much of the ground gained in the 2015 local elections, whereas results for the emerging far-right Vox were very modest.

== Overview ==
=== Local government ===
Under the 1978 Constitution, the governance of municipalities in Spain was centered on the figure of city councils (Spanish: ayuntamientos), local corporations with independent legal personality composed of a mayor, a government council and an elected legislative assembly. The mayor was indirectly elected by the local assembly, requiring an absolute majority; otherwise, the candidate from the most-voted party automatically became mayor (ties were resolved by drawing lots). The concejo abierto system (English: open council), under which voters directly elected the local mayor by plurality voting, was reserved for some minor local entities.

Provincial deputations were the governing bodies of provinces in Spain—except for single-province autonomous communities—having an administration role of municipal activities and composed of a provincial president, an administrative body, and a plenary. For insular provinces, such as the Balearic and Canary Islands, deputations were replaced by island councils in each of the islands or group of islands. For Gran Canaria, Tenerife, Fuerteventura, La Gomera, El Hierro, Lanzarote and La Palma, this figure was referred to in Spanish as cabildo insular, whereas for Mallorca, Menorca, Ibiza and Formentera, its name was consejo insular (Catalan: consell insular). The three Basque provinces had foral deputations instead (called General Assemblies, or Juntas Generales).

=== Date ===
The term of local assemblies in Spain expired four years after the date of their previous election, with election day being fixed for the fourth Sunday of May every four years. The election decree was required to be issued no later than 54 days before the scheduled election date and published on the following day in the Official State Gazette (BOE). The previous local elections were held on 24 May 2015, setting the date for election day on the fourth Sunday of May four years later, which was 26 May 2019.

Local assemblies could not be dissolved before the expiration of their term, except in cases of mismanagement that seriously harmed the public interest and implied a breach of constitutional obligations, in which case the Council of Ministers could—optionally—decide to call a by-election.

Elections to the assemblies of local entities were officially called on 2 April 2019 with the publication of the corresponding decree in the BOE, setting election day for 26 May. Subsequent by-elections were called on 24 September, for 17 November.

=== Electoral system ===
Voting for local assemblies and island councils was based on universal suffrage, comprising all Spanish nationals over 18 years of age, registered and residing in the municipality or council and with full political rights (provided that they had not been deprived of the right to vote by a final sentence), (Note: Amendments in 2018 granted the right to vote to those legally incapacitated.) as well as resident non-national European citizens, and those whose country of origin allowed reciprocal voting by virtue of a treaty.

Local councillors were elected using the D'Hondt method and closed-list proportional voting, with a five percent-threshold of valid votes (including blank ballots) in each constituency. Each municipality or council was a multi-member constituency, with a number of seats based on the following scale:

| Population | Councillors | | |
| Population | Municipalities | Canary Islands | Balearic Islands (Note: For the Island Council of Formentera, councillors in the city council served as island councillors.) |
|---|---|---|---|
| <100 | 3 | No island below 5,000 inhabitants | Fixed number: Ibiza: 13; Menorca: 13; Mallorca: 33; Formentera: Same as homonymous city council |
| 101–250 | 5 | No island below 5,000 inhabitants | Fixed number: Ibiza: 13; Menorca: 13; Mallorca: 33; Formentera: Same as homonymous city council |
| 251–1,000 | 7 | No island below 5,000 inhabitants | Fixed number: Ibiza: 13; Menorca: 13; Mallorca: 33; Formentera: Same as homonymous city council |
| 1,001–2,000 | 9 | No island below 5,000 inhabitants | Fixed number: Ibiza: 13; Menorca: 13; Mallorca: 33; Formentera: Same as homonymous city council |
| 2,001–5,000 | 11 | No island below 5,000 inhabitants | Fixed number: Ibiza: 13; Menorca: 13; Mallorca: 33; Formentera: Same as homonymous city council |
| 5,001–10,000 | 13 | 11 | Fixed number: Ibiza: 13; Menorca: 13; Mallorca: 33; Formentera: Same as homonymous city council |
| 10,001–20,000 | 17 | 13 | Fixed number: Ibiza: 13; Menorca: 13; Mallorca: 33; Formentera: Same as homonymous city council |
| 20,001–50,000 | 21 | 17 | Fixed number: Ibiza: 13; Menorca: 13; Mallorca: 33; Formentera: Same as homonymous city council |
| 50,001–100,000 | 25 | 21 | Fixed number: Ibiza: 13; Menorca: 13; Mallorca: 33; Formentera: Same as homonymous city council |
| >100,001 | +1 per each 100,000 inhabitants or fraction +1 if total is an even number | | Fixed number: Ibiza: 13; Menorca: 13; Mallorca: 33; Formentera: Same as homonymous city council |

Councillors in municipalities below 250 inhabitants were elected using open-list partial block voting, with voters in constituencies between 101 and 250 inhabitants choosing up to four candidates; and in those below 100, up to two.

Most provincial deputations were indirectly elected by applying the D'Hondt method and a three percent-threshold of valid votes to municipal results—excluding candidacies not electing any councillor—in each judicial district. Seats were allocated to provincial deputations based on the following scale (with each judicial district being assigned an initial minimum of one seat and a maximum of three-fifths of the total number of provincial seats, with the remaining ones distributed in proportion to population):

| Population | Seats |
|---|---|
| <500,000 | 25 |
| 500,001–1,000,000 | 27 |
| 1,000,001–3,500,000 | 31 |
| >3,500,001 | 51 |

The General Assemblies of Álava, Biscay and Gipuzkoa were directly elected by voters under their own, specific electoral regulations.

The law did not provide for by-elections to fill vacant seats; instead, any vacancies arising after the proclamation of candidates and during the legislative term were filled by the next candidates on the party lists or, when required, by designated substitutes.

== Parties and candidates ==
The electoral law allowed for parties and federations registered in the interior ministry, alliances and groupings of electors to present lists of candidates. Parties and federations intending to form an alliance were required to inform the relevant electoral commission within 10 days of the election call, whereas groupings of electors needed to secure the signature of a determined amount of the electors registered in the municipality for which they sought election, disallowing electors from signing for more than one list:

- At least one percent of the electors in municipalities with a population below 5,000 inhabitants, provided that the number of signers was more than double that of councillors at stake.
- At least 100 signatures in municipalities with a population between 5,001 and 10,000.
- At least 500 signatures in municipalities with a population between 10,001 and 50,000.
- At least 1,500 signatures in municipalities with a population between 50,001 and 150,000.
- At least 3,000 signatures in municipalities with a population between 150,001 and 300,000.
- At least 5,000 signatures in municipalities with a population between 300,001 and 1,000,000.
- At least 8,000 signatures in municipalities with a population over 1,000,001.

Additionally, a balanced composition of men and women was required in the electoral lists, so that candidates of either sex made up at least 40 percent of the total composition.

== Results ==
=== Municipal ===
==== Overall ====
← Summary of the 26 May 2019 Spanish municipal election results →
| Parties and alliances | Popular vote | | | Councillors | |
| Parties and alliances | Votes | % | ±pp | Total | +/− |
|---|---|---|---|---|---|
| Spanish Socialist Workers' Party (PSOE) | 6,695,553 | 29.39 | +4.37 | **22,341** | +1,483 |
| People's Party (PP)^{1} | 5,162,031 | 22.66 | −4.34 | **20,376** | −2,345 |
| Citizens–Party of the Citizenry (Cs) | 2,089,018 | 9.17 | +2.63 | **2,793** | +1,277 |
| Citizens–Party of the Citizenry (Cs)^{2} | 1,989,566 | 8.73 | +2.54 | 2,787 | +1,276 |
| Barcelona for Change–Citizens (BCN Canvi–Cs)^{3} | 99,452 | 0.44 | +0.10 | 6 | +1 |
| United We Can (Unidas Podemos) | 2,014,934 | 8.84 | −3.39 | **2,667** | −984 |
| United We Can (Podemos–IU–Equo)^{4} | 1,647,870 | 7.23 | −3.27 | 2,387 | −882 |
| In Common We Can–In Common We Win (ECP–ECG)^{5} | 367,064 | 1.61 | −0.13 | 280 | −102 |
| Vox (Vox) | 843,389 | 3.70 | +3.41 | **547** | +525 |
| Republican Left of Catalonia–Municipal Agreement (ERC–AM) | 829,005 | 3.64 | +1.35 | **3,125** | +738 |
| More Madrid (Más Madrid) | 561,486 | 2.46 | +0.14 | **32** | +12 |
| More Madrid (Más Madrid)^{6} | 556,014 | 2.44 | +0.12 | 30 | +10 |
| More Madrid–United Left (Más Madrid–IU) | 5,472 | 0.02 | New | 2 | +2 |
| Together for Catalonia–Together (JxCat–Junts)^{7} | 558,508 | 2.45 | −0.54 | **2,804** | −532 |
| Basque Nationalist Party (EAJ/PNV) | 408,984 | 1.79 | +0.18 | **1,065** | +46 |
| Basque Country Gather (EH Bildu) | 348,577 | 1.53 | +0.15 | **1,263** | +68 |
| Municipal Commitment: Bloc–Initiative–Greens Equo (Compromís Municipal) | 347,110 | 1.52 | −0.19 | **734** | +10 |
| Galician Nationalist Bloc (BNG) | 194,365 | 0.85 | ±0.00 | **456** | −12 |
| Canarian Coalition–PNC–United for Gran Canaria (CCa–PNC–UxGC) | 178,790 | 0.78 | −0.01 | **312** | −8 |
| Canarian Coalition–PNC–United for Gran Canaria (CCa–PNC–UxGC)^{8} | 177,177 | 0.78 | −0.01 | 304 | −5 |
| Independent Herrenian Group (AHI) | 1,613 | 0.01 | ±0.00 | 8 | −3 |
| Popular Unity Candidacy–Municipalist Alternative (CUP–AMunt) | 176,963 | 0.78 | −0.15 | **336** | −26 |
| Sum Navarre (NA+)^{9} | 104,848 | 0.46 | +0.03 | **298** | −9 |
| Regionalist Party of Cantabria (PRC) | 82,077 | 0.36 | +0.04 | **351** | +26 |
| New Canaries–Broad Front (NC–FA) | 76,523 | 0.34 | +0.01 | **105** | +15 |
| Andalusia by Herself (AxSí)^{10} | 50,723 | 0.22 | −0.45 | **106** | −213 |
| More for Mallorca–APIB (Més–APIB) | 46,539 | 0.20 | −0.06 | **120** | −8 |
| Catalonia Primaries (Primàries) | 45,994 | 0.20 | New | **21** | +21 |
| Animalist Party Against Mistreatment of Animals (PACMA) | 45,724 | 0.20 | −0.05 | 0 | ±0 |
| Aragonese Party (PAR) | 43,326 | 0.19 | −0.07 | **661** | −257 |
| El Pi–Proposal for the Isles (El Pi) | 30,876 | 0.14 | −0.01 | **96** | −1 |
| El Pi–Proposal for the Isles (El Pi) | 29,182 | 0.13 | −0.02 | 94 | −3 |
| Proposal for Ibiza (PxE) | 1,694 | 0.01 | New | 2 | +2 |
| Aragonese Union (CHA) | 30,865 | 0.14 | −0.05 | **148** | −16 |
| Forum of Citizens (FAC) | 30,408 | 0.13 | −0.16 | **49** | −34 |
| All for Terrassa (TxT) | 27,972 | 0.12 | New | **10** | +10 |
| Citizens' Movement of Cartagena (MCC) | 23,934 | 0.11 | +0.04 | **8** | +3 |
| Coalition 100x100 (100x100) | 21,574 | 0.09 | +0.06 | **31** | +22 |
| Leonese People's Union (UPL) | 21,557 | 0.09 | +0.01 | **151** | +12 |
| Yes to the Future (GBai) | 21,490 | 0.09 | −0.04 | **50** | −9 |
| Local Tides (Mareas Locais) | 21,277 | 0.09 | New | **47** | +47 |
| Neighbours' Alternative (AV) | 20,057 | 0.09 | +0.03 | **28** | +11 |
| Union of Independent Citizens (UCIN) | 18,920 | 0.08 | +0.03 | **73** | +23 |
| Let's Win (Ganemos) | 18,113 | 0.08 | −0.53 | **14** | −76 |
| With You, We Are Democracy (Contigo) | 17,471 | 0.08 | New | **19** | +19 |
| Act–The Left Today–The Greens (PACT–LIH–GMLV) | 17,256 | 0.08 | New | **13** | +13 |
| For Ávila (XAV) | 14,811 | 0.07 | New | **80** | +80 |
| Union for Leganés (ULEG) | 14,741 | 0.06 | −0.03 | **4** | −2 |
| Ourensan Democracy (DO) | 13,279 | 0.06 | −0.01 | **9** | −3 |
| Vall d'Albaida Unites Us (La Vall) | 12,733 | 0.06 | New | **28** | +28 |
| Citizens of Democratic Centre (CCD) | 12,524 | 0.05 | −0.08 | **23** | −21 |
| Commitment to Galicia (CxG) | 12,139 | 0.05 | −0.03 | **20** | −21 |
| Yes We Can (SSP) | 11,695 | 0.05 | −0.06 | **21** | −18 |
| Independents for Huelva (IxH)^{11} | 11,687 | 0.05 | +0.04 | **43** | +20 |
| Coalition for Melilla (CpM) | 10,472 | 0.05 | +0.01 | **8** | +1 |
| Independents of La Selva (IdSelva) | 9,229 | 0.04 | +0.01 | **48** | +5 |
| All for Empordà (Txl'E) | 7,644 | 0.03 | New | **34** | +34 |
| Cuenca Unites Us (CNU) | 6,216 | 0.03 | New | **6** | +6 |
| Gomera Socialist Group (ASG) | 5,602 | 0.02 | ±0.00 | **34** | +10 |
| Sorian People's Platform (PPSO) | 5,483 | 0.02 | New | **78** | +78 |
| More for Menorca (MxMe) | 4,716 | 0.02 | ±0.00 | **13** | ±0 |
| People for Formentera (GxF) | 1,398 | 0.01 | ±0.00 | **6** | −3 |
| The Union of Formentera (PP–CompromísFormentera) (Sa Unió)^{12} | 1,329 | 0.01 | ±0.00 | **6** | ±0 |
| Others (lists at <0.05% not securing any provincial or island seat) | 1,188,743 | 5.22 | — | **5,265** | −587 |
| Blank ballots | 214,596 | 0.94 | −0.72 | | |
| **Total** | **22,785,274** | | | **66,979** | **−536** |
| Valid votes | 22,785,274 | 99.08 | +0.61 | | |
| Invalid votes | 211,096 | 0.92 | −0.61 | | |
| **Votes cast / turnout** | **22,996,370** | **65.19** | **+0.28** | | |
| Abstentions | 12,278,917 | 34.81 | −0.28 | | |
| **Registered voters** | **35,275,287** | | | | |
Sources
Footnotes: ^{1} People's Party does not include results in Navarre and Formentera.; ^{2} Citizens–Party of the Citizenry (Cs) does not include results in Navarre and the municipality of Barcelona.; ^{3} Barcelona for Change–Citizens results are compared to Citizens–Party of the Citizenry totals in the municipality of Barcelona in the 2015 elections.; ^{4} United We Can results are compared to the combined totals of Podemos-linked citizen/popular unity platforms, United Left and Equo in the 2015 elections, not including Catalonia nor results for Madrid Now.; ^{5} In Common We Can–In Common We Win results are compared to the combined totals of Podemos-linked citizen/popular unity platforms (in Catalonia) and Agreement in the 2015 elections.; ^{6} More Madrid results are compared to Madrid Now totals in the 2015 elections.; ^{7} Together for Catalonia–Together results are compared to Convergence and Union totals in the 2015 elections.; ^{8} Canarian Coalition–PNC–United for Gran Canaria results are compared to the combined totals of Canarian Coalition–Canarian Nationalist Party and United for Gran Canaria in the 2015 elections.; ^{9} Sum Navarre results are compared to the combined totals of Navarrese People's Union, People's Party and Citizens–Party of the Citizenry in Navarre in the 2015 elections.; ^{10} Andalusia by Herself results are compared to Andalusian Party totals in the 2015 elections.; ^{11} Independents for Huelva results are compared to Independents Coalition for Huelva totals in the 2015 elections.; ^{12} The Union of Formentera results are compared to the combined totals of People's Party (in Formentera) and Commitment to Formentera in the 2015 elections.

Popular vote
| PSOE | 29.39% |
| PP | 22.66% |
| Cs | 9.17% |
| Unidas Podemos | 8.84% |
| Vox | 3.70% |
| ERC–AM | 3.64% |
| Más Madrid | 2.46% |
| JxCat–Junts | 2.45% |
| EAJ/PNV | 1.79% |
| EH Bildu | 1.53% |
| Compromís | 1.52% |
| BNG | 0.85% |
| CCa–PNC | 0.78% |
| CUP–AMunt | 0.78% |
| Others | 9.49% |
| Blank ballots | 0.94% |

==== City control ====
The following table lists party control in provincial capitals (highlighted in bold), as well as in municipalities above 75,000. Gains for a party are highlighted in that party's colour.

| Municipality | Population | Previous control | New control |
|---|---|---|---|
| **A Coruña** | 244,850 | Atlantic Tide (Marea) | Spanish Socialist Workers' Party (PSOE) |
| **Albacete** | 173,050 | People's Party (PP) | Citizens–Party of the Citizenry (Cs) (PSOE in 2021) |
| Alcalá de Guadaíra | 75,256 | Spanish Socialist Workers' Party (PSOE) | Spanish Socialist Workers' Party (PSOE) |
| Alcalá de Henares | 193,751 | Spanish Socialist Workers' Party (PSOE) | Spanish Socialist Workers' Party (PSOE) |
| Alcobendas | 116,037 | People's Party (PP) | Spanish Socialist Workers' Party (PSOE) |
| Alcorcón | 169,502 | People's Party (PP) | Spanish Socialist Workers' Party (PSOE) |
| Algeciras | 121,414 | People's Party (PP) | People's Party (PP) |
| **Alicante** | 331,577 | People's Party (PP) | People's Party (PP) |
| **Almería** | 196,851 | People's Party (PP) | People's Party (PP) |
| Arona | 79,448 | Spanish Socialist Workers' Party (PSOE) | Spanish Socialist Workers' Party (PSOE) |
| **Ávila** | 57,657 | People's Party (PP) | For Ávila (XAV) |
| Avilés | 78,715 | Spanish Socialist Workers' Party (PSOE) | Spanish Socialist Workers' Party (PSOE) |
| **Badajoz** | 150,530 | People's Party (PP) | People's Party (PP) (Cs in 2021; PP in 2022) |
| Badalona | 217,741 | Socialists' Party of Catalonia (PSC–PSOE) | Socialists' Party of Catalonia (PSC–PSOE) (PP in 2020; PSC–PSOE in 2021) |
| Barakaldo | 100,435 | Basque Nationalist Party (EAJ/PNV) | Basque Nationalist Party (EAJ/PNV) |
| **Barcelona** | 1,620,343 | Barcelona in Common (BComú) | Barcelona in Common (BComú) |
| **Bilbao** | 345,821 | Basque Nationalist Party (EAJ/PNV) | Basque Nationalist Party (EAJ/PNV) |
| **Burgos** | 175,921 | People's Party (PP) | Spanish Socialist Workers' Party (PSOE) |
| **Cáceres** | 96,068 | People's Party (PP) | Spanish Socialist Workers' Party (PSOE) |
| **Cádiz** | 116,979 | Forward Andalusia (Adelante) | Forward Andalusia (Adelante) |
| Cartagena | 213,943 | Spanish Socialist Workers' Party (PSOE) | Spanish Socialist Workers' Party (PSOE) |
| **Castellón de la Plana** | 170,888 | Spanish Socialist Workers' Party (PSOE) | Spanish Socialist Workers' Party (PSOE) |
| Chiclana de la Frontera | 83,831 | Spanish Socialist Workers' Party (PSOE) | Spanish Socialist Workers' Party (PSOE) |
| **Ciudad Real** | 74,743 | Spanish Socialist Workers' Party (PSOE) | Spanish Socialist Workers' Party (PSOE) (Cs in 2021) |
| **Córdoba** | 325,708 | Spanish Socialist Workers' Party (PSOE) | People's Party (PP) |
| Cornellà de Llobregat | 87,173 | Socialists' Party of Catalonia (PSC–PSOE) | Socialists' Party of Catalonia (PSC–PSOE) |
| Coslada | 81,860 | Spanish Socialist Workers' Party (PSOE) | Spanish Socialist Workers' Party (PSOE) |
| **Cuenca** | 54,898 | People's Party (PP) | Spanish Socialist Workers' Party (PSOE) |
| **Donostia/San Sebastián** | 186,665 | Basque Nationalist Party (EAJ/PNV) | Basque Nationalist Party (EAJ/PNV) |
| Dos Hermanas | 133,168 | Spanish Socialist Workers' Party (PSOE) | Spanish Socialist Workers' Party (PSOE) |
| El Ejido | 84,710 | People's Party (PP) | People's Party (PP) |
| El Puerto de Santa María | 88,364 | Spanish Socialist Workers' Party (PSOE) | People's Party (PP) |
| Elche | 230,625 | Spanish Socialist Workers' Party (PSOE) | Spanish Socialist Workers' Party (PSOE) |
| Ferrol | 66,799 (Note: Reached 75,000 in 1970–2007.) | Ferrol in Common–Son (Ferrol en Común) | Spanish Socialist Workers' Party (PSOE) |
| Fuengirola | 75,396 | People's Party (PP) | People's Party (PP) |
| Fuenlabrada | 193,586 | Spanish Socialist Workers' Party (PSOE) | Spanish Socialist Workers' Party (PSOE) |
| Gandía | 73,829 (Note: Reached 75,000 in 2007–2015.) | Spanish Socialist Workers' Party (PSOE) | Spanish Socialist Workers' Party (PSOE) |
| Getafe | 180,747 | Spanish Socialist Workers' Party (PSOE) | Spanish Socialist Workers' Party (PSOE) |
| Getxo | 78,276 | Basque Nationalist Party (EAJ/PNV) | Basque Nationalist Party (EAJ/PNV) |
| Gijón | 271,843 | Forum of Citizens (FAC) | Spanish Socialist Workers' Party (PSOE) |
| **Girona** | 100,266 | Together for Catalonia (JxCat–Junts) | Together for Catalonia (JxCat–Junts) |
| **Granada** | 232,208 | Spanish Socialist Workers' Party (PSOE) | Citizens–Party of the Citizenry (Cs) (PSOE in 2021) |
| **Guadalajara** | 84,145 | People's Party (PP) | Spanish Socialist Workers' Party (PSOE) |
| **Huelva** | 144,258 | Spanish Socialist Workers' Party (PSOE) | Spanish Socialist Workers' Party (PSOE) |
| **Huesca** | 52,463 | Spanish Socialist Workers' Party (PSOE) | Spanish Socialist Workers' Party (PSOE) |
| **Jaén** | 113,457 | People's Party (PP) | Spanish Socialist Workers' Party (PSOE) |
| Jerez de la Frontera | 212,879 | Spanish Socialist Workers' Party (PSOE) | Spanish Socialist Workers' Party (PSOE) |
| L'Hospitalet de Llobregat | 261,068 | Socialists' Party of Catalonia (PSC–PSOE) | Socialists' Party of Catalonia (PSC–PSOE) |
| **Las Palmas de Gran Canaria** | 378,517 | Spanish Socialist Workers' Party (PSOE) | Spanish Socialist Workers' Party (PSOE) |
| Las Rozas de Madrid | 95,550 | People's Party (PP) | People's Party (PP) |
| Leganés | 186,907 | Spanish Socialist Workers' Party (PSOE) | Spanish Socialist Workers' Party (PSOE) |
| **León** | 124,772 | People's Party (PP) | Spanish Socialist Workers' Party (PSOE) |
| **Lleida** | 137,856 | Socialists' Party of Catalonia (PSC–PSOE) | Republican Left of Catalonia (ERC) |
| **Logroño** | 151,113 | People's Party (PP) | Spanish Socialist Workers' Party (PSOE) |
| Lorca | 93,079 | People's Party (PP) | Spanish Socialist Workers' Party (PSOE) |
| **Lugo** | 98,025 | Spanish Socialist Workers' Party (PSOE) | Spanish Socialist Workers' Party (PSOE) |
| **Madrid** | 3,223,334 | More Madrid (Más Madrid) | People's Party (PP) |
| **Málaga** | 571,026 | People's Party (PP) | People's Party (PP) |
| Manresa | 76,250 | Together for Catalonia (JxCat–Junts) | Together for Catalonia (JxCat–Junts) (ERC in 2020) |
| Marbella | 141,463 | People's Party (PP) | People's Party (PP) |
| Mataró | 126,988 | Socialists' Party of Catalonia (PSC–PSOE) | Socialists' Party of Catalonia (PSC–PSOE) |
| Mijas | 80,630 | Citizens–Party of the Citizenry (Cs) | Spanish Socialist Workers' Party (PSOE) |
| Móstoles | 207,095 | Spanish Socialist Workers' Party (PSOE) | Spanish Socialist Workers' Party (PSOE) |
| **Murcia** | 447,182 | People's Party (PP) | People's Party (PP) (PSOE in 2021) |
| Orihuela | 101,321 | People's Party (PP) | People's Party (PP) (PSOE in 2022) |
| **Ourense** | 105,505 | People's Party (PP) | Ourensan Democracy (DO) |
| **Oviedo** | 220,020 | Spanish Socialist Workers' Party (PSOE) | People's Party (PP) |
| **Palencia** | 78,629 | People's Party (PP) | Citizens–Party of the Citizenry (Cs) |
| **Palma** | 409,661 | More for Mallorca (Més) | Spanish Socialist Workers' Party (PSOE) |
| **Pamplona** | 199,066 | Basque Country Gather (EH Bildu) | Sum Navarre (NA+) |
| Parla | 128,256 | People's Party (PP) | Spanish Socialist Workers' Party (PSOE) |
| **Pontevedra** | 82,802 | Galician Nationalist Bloc (BNG) | Galician Nationalist Bloc (BNG) |
| Pozuelo de Alarcón | 86,172 | People's Party (PP) | People's Party (PP) |
| Reus | 103,477 | Together for Catalonia (JxCat–Junts) | Together for Catalonia (JxCat–Junts) |
| Rivas-Vaciamadrid | 85,893 | United Left (IU) | United Left (IU) |
| Roquetas de Mar | 94,925 | People's Party (PP) | People's Party (PP) |
| Rubí | 76,423 | Socialists' Party of Catalonia (PSC–PSOE) | Socialists' Party of Catalonia (PSC–PSOE) |
| Sabadell | 211,734 | Popular Unity Candidacy (CUP) | Socialists' Party of Catalonia (PSC–PSOE) |
| **Salamanca** | 143,978 | People's Party (PP) | People's Party (PP) |
| San Cristóbal de La Laguna | 155,549 | Canarian Coalition–Canarian Nationalist Party (CCa) | Spanish Socialist Workers' Party (PSOE) |
| San Fernando | 95,174 | Spanish Socialist Workers' Party (PSOE) | Spanish Socialist Workers' Party (PSOE) |
| San Sebastián de los Reyes | 87,724 | Spanish Socialist Workers' Party (PSOE) | Spanish Socialist Workers' Party (PSOE) |
| Sant Boi de Llobregat | 82,904 | Socialists' Party of Catalonia (PSC–PSOE) | Socialists' Party of Catalonia (PSC–PSOE) |
| Sant Cugat del Vallès | 90,664 | Together for Catalonia (JxCat–Junts) | Republican Left of Catalonia (ERC) |
| Santa Coloma de Gramenet | 118,821 | Socialists' Party of Catalonia (PSC–PSOE) | Socialists' Party of Catalonia (PSC–PSOE) |
| **Santa Cruz de Tenerife** | 204,856 | Canarian Coalition–Canarian Nationalist Party (CCa–PNC) | Spanish Socialist Workers' Party (PSOE) (CCa–PNC in 2020) |
| **Santander** | 172,044 | People's Party (PP) | People's Party (PP) |
| Santiago de Compostela | 96,405 | Open Compostela (CA) | Spanish Socialist Workers' Party (PSOE) |
| **Segovia** | 51,683 | Spanish Socialist Workers' Party (PSOE) | Spanish Socialist Workers' Party (PSOE) |
| **Seville** | 688,711 | Spanish Socialist Workers' Party (PSOE) | Spanish Socialist Workers' Party (PSOE) |
| **Soria** | 39,112 | Spanish Socialist Workers' Party (PSOE) | Spanish Socialist Workers' Party (PSOE) |
| Talavera de la Reina | 83,009 | People's Party (PP) | Spanish Socialist Workers' Party (PSOE) |
| **Tarragona** | 132,299 | Socialists' Party of Catalonia (PSC–PSOE) | Republican Left of Catalonia (ERC) |
| Telde | 123,265 | New Canaries (NCa) | Canarian Coalition–Canarian Nationalist Party (CCa–PNC) (NCa in 2021) |
| Terrassa | 218,535 | Socialists' Party of Catalonia (PSC–PSOE) | All for Terrassa (TxT) |
| **Teruel** | 35,691 | People's Party (PP) | People's Party (PP) |
| **Toledo** | 84,282 | Spanish Socialist Workers' Party (PSOE) | Spanish Socialist Workers' Party (PSOE) |
| Torrejón de Ardoz | 129,729 | People's Party (PP) | People's Party (PP) |
| Torrent | 81,245 | Spanish Socialist Workers' Party (PSOE) | Spanish Socialist Workers' Party (PSOE) |
| Torrevieja | 82,599 | The Greens (LV) | People's Party (PP) |
| **Valencia** | 791,413 | Commitment Coalition (Compromís) | Commitment Coalition (Compromís) |
| **Valladolid** | 298,866 | Spanish Socialist Workers' Party (PSOE) | Spanish Socialist Workers' Party (PSOE) |
| Vélez-Málaga | 80,817 | Spanish Socialist Workers' Party (PSOE) | Spanish Socialist Workers' Party (PSOE) |
| Vigo | 293,642 | Spanish Socialist Workers' Party (PSOE) | Spanish Socialist Workers' Party (PSOE) |
| **Vitoria-Gasteiz** | 249,176 | Basque Nationalist Party (EAJ/PNV) | Basque Nationalist Party (EAJ/PNV) |
| **Zamora** | 61,827 | United Left (IU) | United Left (IU) |
| **Zaragoza** | 666,880 | Zaragoza in Common (ZGZ) | People's Party (PP) |

==== Autonomous cities ====
The following table lists party control in the autonomous cities. Gains for a party are highlighted in that party's colour.

| City | Population | Previous control | New control |
|---|---|---|---|
| Ceuta | 85,144 | People's Party (PP) | People's Party (PP) |
| Melilla | 86,384 | People's Party (PP) | Citizens–Party of the Citizenry (Cs) |

=== Provincial and island ===
==== Summary ====
← Summary of the 26 May 2019 Spanish provincial and island election results →
| Parties and alliances | Seats | | | | |
| Parties and alliances | PD | IC | FD | Total | +/− |
|---|---|---|---|---|---|
| Spanish Socialist Workers' Party (PSOE) | 449 | 72 | 27 | **548** | +84 |
| People's Party (PP)^{1} | 358 | 42 | 11 | **411** | −68 |
| United We Can (Podemos–IU–Equo) | 40 | 16 | 14 | **70** | −43 |
| United We Can (Podemos–IU–Equo)^{2} | 34 | 16 | 14 | 64 | −42 |
| In Common We Can–In Common We Win (ECP–ECG)^{3} | 6 | — | — | 6 | −1 |
| Basque Nationalist Party (EAJ/PNV) | — | — | 62 | **62** | +8 |
| Citizens–Party of the Citizenry (Cs) | 52 | 9 | 0 | **61** | +20 |
| Republican Left of Catalonia–Municipal Agreement (ERC–AM) | 47 | — | — | **47** | +15 |
| Canarian Coalition–PNC–United for Gran Canaria (CCa–PNC–UxGC) | — | 41 | — | **41** | −4 |
| Canarian Coalition–PNC–United for Gran Canaria (CCa–PNC–UxGC)^{4} | — | 38 | — | 38 | −1 |
| Independent Herrenian Group (AHI) | — | 3 | — | 3 | −3 |
| Basque Country Gather (EH Bildu) | — | — | 39 | **39** | ±0 |
| Together for Catalonia–Together (JxCat–Junts)^{5} | 35 | — | — | **35** | −16 |
| Vox (Vox) | 10 | 3 | 0 | **13** | +13 |
| Galician Nationalist Bloc (BNG) | 11 | — | — | **11** | −1 |
| New Canaries–Broad Front (NC–FA)^{6} | — | 11 | — | **11** | −4 |
| Gomera Socialist Group (ASG) | — | 11 | — | **11** | +1 |
| Municipal Commitment: Bloc–Initiative–Greens Equo (Compromís Municipal) | 8 | — | — | **8** | −3 |
| Aragonese Party (PAR) | 8 | — | — | **8** | −1 |
| People for Formentera (GxF) | — | 6 | — | **6** | −3 |
| The Union of Formentera (PP–CompromísFormentera) (Sa Unió)^{7} | — | 6 | — | **6** | ±0 |
| More for Mallorca (Més) | — | 4 | — | **4** | −2 |
| For Ávila (XAV) | 4 | — | — | **4** | +4 |
| For El Hierro Electoral Group (AEPEH) | — | 4 | — | **4** | +4 |
| El Pi–Proposal for the Isles (El Pi) | — | 3 | — | **3** | ±0 |
| More for Menorca (MxMe) | — | 3 | — | **3** | ±0 |
| Sorian People's Platform (PPSO) | 3 | — | — | **3** | +3 |
| Coalition 100x100 (100x100) | 2 | — | — | **2** | +2 |
| Ourensan Democracy (DO) | 2 | — | — | **2** | ±0 |
| Yes We Can (SSP) | — | 2 | — | **2** | +1 |
| Popular Unity Candidacy (CUP) | 1 | — | — | **1** | −5 |
| Andalusia by Herself (AxSí)^{8} | 1 | — | — | **1** | ±0 |
| All for Terrassa (TxT) | 1 | — | — | **1** | +1 |
| Leonese People's Union (UPL) | 1 | — | — | **1** | ±0 |
| Neighbours' Alternative (AV) | 1 | — | — | **1** | ±0 |
| Vall d'Albaida Unites Us (La Vall) | 1 | — | — | **1** | +1 |
| Independents of La Selva (IdSelva) | 1 | — | — | **1** | ±0 |
| All for Empordà (Txl'E) | 1 | — | — | **1** | +1 |
| Cuenca Unites Us (CNU) | 1 | — | — | **1** | +1 |
| Aragonese Union (CHA) | 0 | — | — | 0 | −2 |
| Coalition for El Bierzo (CB) | 0 | — | — | 0 | −1 |
| Union, Progress and Democracy (UPyD) | 0 | — | — | 0 | −2 |
| Lanzarote Advances (LAVA)^{9} | — | 0 | — | 0 | −1 |
| Win Fuerteventura (PPMAJO–UP Majorero)^{10} | — | 0 | — | 0 | −2 |
| Participatory Democracy (Participa) | n/a | n/a | n/a | 0 | −1 |
| **Total** | **1,038** | **233** | **153** | **1,424** | **±0** |
Sources
Footnotes: ^{1} People's Party does not include results in Formentera.; ^{2} United We Can results are compared to the combined totals of Podemos-linked citizen/popular unity platforms, United Left and Equo in the 2015 elections, not including Catalonia.; ^{3} In Common We Can–In Common We Win results are compared to the combined totals of Podemos-linked citizen/popular unity platforms (in Catalonia) and Agreement in the 2015 elections.; ^{4} Canarian Coalition–PNC–United for Gran Canaria results are compared to the combined totals of Canarian Coalition–Canarian Nationalist Party and United for Gran Canaria in the 2015 elections.; ^{5} Together for Catalonia–Together results are compared to Convergence and Union totals in the 2015 elections.; ^{6} New Canaries–Broad Front results are compared to the combined totals of New Canaries–Broad Front and We Are Lanzarote in the 2015 elections.; ^{7} The Union of Formentera results are compared to the combined totals of People's Party (in Formentera) and Commitment to Formentera in the 2015 elections.; ^{8} Andalusia by Herself results are compared to Andalusian Party totals in the 2015 elections.; ^{9} Lanzarote Advances results are compared to Lanzarote Independents Party totals in the 2015 elections.; ^{10} Win Fuerteventura results are compared to Majorero Progressive Party totals in the 2015 elections.

==== Indirectly-elected ====
The following table lists party control in the indirectly-elected provincial deputations. Gains for a party are highlighted in that party's colour.

| Province | Population | Previous control | New control |
|---|---|---|---|
| A Coruña | 1,119,351 | Spanish Socialist Workers' Party (PSOE) | Spanish Socialist Workers' Party (PSOE) |
| Albacete | 388,786 | Spanish Socialist Workers' Party (PSOE) | Spanish Socialist Workers' Party (PSOE) |
| Alicante | 1,838,819 | People's Party (PP) | People's Party (PP) |
| Almería | 709,340 | People's Party (PP) | People's Party (PP) |
| Ávila | 158,498 | People's Party (PP) | People's Party (PP) |
| Badajoz | 676,376 | Spanish Socialist Workers' Party (PSOE) | Spanish Socialist Workers' Party (PSOE) |
| Barcelona | 5,609,350 | Together for Catalonia (JxCat–Junts) | Socialists' Party of Catalonia (PSC–PSOE) |
| Burgos | 357,070 | People's Party (PP) | People's Party (PP) |
| Cáceres | 396,487 | Spanish Socialist Workers' Party (PSOE) | Spanish Socialist Workers' Party (PSOE) |
| Cádiz | 1,238,714 | Spanish Socialist Workers' Party (PSOE) | Spanish Socialist Workers' Party (PSOE) |
| Castellón | 576,898 | People's Party (PP) | Spanish Socialist Workers' Party (PSOE) |
| Ciudad Real | 499,100 | Spanish Socialist Workers' Party (PSOE) | Spanish Socialist Workers' Party (PSOE) |
| Córdoba | 785,240 | Spanish Socialist Workers' Party (PSOE) | Spanish Socialist Workers' Party (PSOE) |
| Cuenca | 197,222 | People's Party (PP) | Spanish Socialist Workers' Party (PSOE) |
| Girona | 761,947 | Together for Catalonia (JxCat–Junts) | Together for Catalonia (JxCat–Junts) |
| Granada | 912,075 | Spanish Socialist Workers' Party (PSOE) | Spanish Socialist Workers' Party (PSOE) |
| Guadalajara | 254,308 | People's Party (PP) | Spanish Socialist Workers' Party (PSOE) |
| Huelva | 519,932 | Spanish Socialist Workers' Party (PSOE) | Spanish Socialist Workers' Party (PSOE) |
| Huesca | 219,345 | Spanish Socialist Workers' Party (PSOE) | Spanish Socialist Workers' Party (PSOE) |
| Jaén | 638,099 | Spanish Socialist Workers' Party (PSOE) | Spanish Socialist Workers' Party (PSOE) |
| León | 463,746 | People's Party (PP) | Spanish Socialist Workers' Party (PSOE) |
| Lleida | 432,866 | Together for Catalonia (JxCat–Junts) | Republican Left of Catalonia (ERC) |
| Lugo | 331,327 | People's Party (PP) | Spanish Socialist Workers' Party (PSOE) |
| Málaga | 1,641,121 | People's Party (PP) | People's Party (PP) |
| Ourense | 309,293 | People's Party (PP) | People's Party (PP) |
| Palencia | 162,035 | People's Party (PP) | People's Party (PP) |
| Pontevedra | 941,772 | Spanish Socialist Workers' Party (PSOE) | Spanish Socialist Workers' Party (PSOE) |
| Salamanca | 331,473 | People's Party (PP) | People's Party (PP) |
| Segovia | 153,342 | People's Party (PP) | People's Party (PP) |
| Seville | 1,939,887 | Spanish Socialist Workers' Party (PSOE) | Spanish Socialist Workers' Party (PSOE) |
| Soria | 88,600 | Spanish Socialist Workers' Party (PSOE) | People's Party (PP) |
| Tarragona | 795,902 | Together for Catalonia (JxCat–Junts) | Republican Left of Catalonia (ERC) |
| Teruel | 134,572 | Aragonese Party (PAR) | Spanish Socialist Workers' Party (PSOE) |
| Toledo | 687,391 | Spanish Socialist Workers' Party (PSOE) | Spanish Socialist Workers' Party (PSOE) |
| Valencia | 2,547,986 | Spanish Socialist Workers' Party (PSOE) | Spanish Socialist Workers' Party (PSOE) |
| Valladolid | 519,851 | People's Party (PP) | People's Party (PP) |
| Zamora | 174,549 | People's Party (PP) | Citizens–Party of the Citizenry (Cs) |
| Zaragoza | 954,811 | Spanish Socialist Workers' Party (PSOE) | Spanish Socialist Workers' Party (PSOE) |

==== Island councils ====
The following table lists party control in the island councils. Gains for a party are highlighted in that party's colour.

| Island | Population | Previous control | New control |
|---|---|---|---|
| El Hierro | 10,798 | Independent Herrenian Group (AHI) | Spanish Socialist Workers' Party (PSOE) |
| Formentera | 12,216 | People for Formentera (GxF) | People for Formentera (GxF) |
| Fuerteventura | 113,275 | Canarian Coalition–Canarian Nationalist Party (CCa–PNC) | Spanish Socialist Workers' Party (PSOE) (AMF in 2021) |
| Gran Canaria | 846,717 | New Canaries (NCa) | New Canaries (NCa) |
| Ibiza | 144,659 | Spanish Socialist Workers' Party (PSOE) | People's Party (PP) |
| La Gomera | 21,136 | Gomera Socialist Group (ASG) | Gomera Socialist Group (ASG) |
| La Palma | 81,863 | Spanish Socialist Workers' Party (PSOE) | Canarian Coalition–Canarian Nationalist Party (CCa–PNC) (PP in 2019) |
| Lanzarote | 149,183 | Canarian Coalition–Canarian Nationalist Party (CCa–PNC) | Spanish Socialist Workers' Party (PSOE) |
| Mallorca | 880,113 | More for Mallorca (Més) | Spanish Socialist Workers' Party (PSOE) |
| Menorca | 91,920 | Spanish Socialist Workers' Party (PSOE) | Spanish Socialist Workers' Party (PSOE) |
| Tenerife | 904,713 | Canarian Coalition–Canarian Nationalist Party (CCa–PNC) | Canarian Coalition–Canarian Nationalist Party (CCa–PNC) (PSOE in 2019) |

==== Foral deputations ====
The following table lists party control in the foral deputations. Gains for a party are highlighted in that party's colour.

| Province | Population | Previous control | New control |
|---|---|---|---|
| Álava | 328,868 | Basque Nationalist Party (EAJ/PNV) | Basque Nationalist Party (EAJ/PNV) |
| Biscay | 1,149,628 | Basque Nationalist Party (EAJ/PNV) | Basque Nationalist Party (EAJ/PNV) |
| Gipuzkoa | 720,592 | Basque Nationalist Party (EAJ/PNV) | Basque Nationalist Party (EAJ/PNV) |

== See also ==
- 2019 Aranese Council election

== Bibliography ==
- Constitución Española (Constitution). Official State Gazette (in Spanish). 27 December 1978 [version as of 27 September 2011]. BOE-A-1978-31229.
- Ley 27/1983, de 25 de noviembre, de Relaciones entre las Instituciones Comunes de la Comunidad Autónoma y los Órganos Forales de sus Territorios Históricos (Law 27/1983). Official State Gazette (in Spanish). 25 November 1983 [version as of 14 April 2016]. BOE-A-2012-5193.
- Ley 7/1985, de 2 de abril, Reguladora de las Bases del Régimen Local (Law 7/1985). Official State Gazette (in Spanish). 2 April 1985 [version as of 4 August 2018]. BOE-A-1985-5392.
- Ley Orgánica 5/1985, de 19 de junio, del Régimen Electoral General (Organic Law 5/1985). Official State Gazette (in Spanish). 19 June 1985 [version as of 6 March 2019]. BOE-A-1985-11672.
- Ley 8/1986, de 26 de noviembre, Electoral de la Comunidad Autónoma de las Islas Baleares (Law 8/1986). Official State Gazette (in Spanish). 26 November 1986 [version as of 2 February 2019]. BOE-A-1987-2903.
- Ley 1/1987, de 27 de marzo, de Elecciones para las Juntas Generales de los Territorios Históricos de Araba, Bizkaia y Gipuzkoa (Law 1/1987). Official State Gazette (in Spanish). 27 March 1987 [version as of 2 March 2005]. BOE-A-2012-3948.
- Ley 8/2000, de 27 de octubre, de Consejos Insulares (Law 8/2000). Official State Gazette (in Spanish). 27 October 2000 [version as of 9 July 2012]. BOE-A-2000-20977.
- Ley Orgánica 1/2007, de 28 de febrero, de reforma del Estatuto de Autonomía de las Illes Balears (Organic Law 1/2007). Official State Gazette (in Spanish). 28 February 2007 [version as of 17 July 2010]. BOE-A-2007-4233.
- Ley 7/2009, de 11 de diciembre, electoral de los Consejos Insulares (Law 7/2009). Official State Gazette (in Spanish). 11 December 2009 [version as of 22 December 2009]. BOE-A-2010-1399.
- Ley 8/2015, de 1 de abril, de Cabildos Insulares (Law 8/2015). Official State Gazette (in Spanish). 1 April 2015 [version as of 22 April 2019]. BOE-A-2015-4621.
- Ley Orgánica 1/2018, de 5 de noviembre, de reforma del Estatuto de Autonomía de Canarias (Organic Law 1/2018). Official State Gazette (in Spanish). 5 November 2018 [version as of 6 November 2018]. BOE-A-2018-15138.
- Real Decreto 209/2019, de 1 de abril, por el que se convocan elecciones locales y a las Asambleas de Ceuta y Melilla para el 26 de mayo de 2019 (Royal Decree 209/2019). Official State Gazette (in Spanish). 1 April 2019. BOE-A-2019-4824.
- Real Decreto 538/2019, de 20 de septiembre, por el que se convocan elecciones locales parciales 2019 (Royal Decree 538/2019). Official State Gazette (in Spanish). 20 September 2019. BOE-A-2019-13514.
