= 2015 Canarian island council elections =

Elections in the Spanish region of the Canary Islands

Island council elections were held in the Canary Islands on 24 May 2015 to elect the 10th Island Councils (the cabildos insulares) of El Hierro, Fuerteventura, Gran Canaria, La Gomera, La Palma, Lanzarote and Tenerife. All 155 seats in the seven island councils were up for election. They were held concurrently with regional elections in thirteen autonomous communities (including the Canary Islands) and local elections all across Spain.

== Overall ==
← Summary of the 24 May 2015 Canarian island council election results →
Parties and alliances	Popular vote			Seats	
Parties and alliances	Votes	%	±pp	Total	+/−
Canarian Coalition–Canarian Nationalist Party (CCa–PNC)	168,482	18.44	−7.09	41	−12
Canarian Coalition–Canarian Nationalist Party (CCa–PNC)^{1}	165,774	18.14	−7.14	35	−12
Independent Herrenian Group (AHI)	2,708	0.30	+0.04	6	±0
Spanish Socialist Workers' Party (PSOE)	166,758	18.25	−2.31	36	−7
People's Party (PP)	163,896	17.94	−12.50	26	−21
New Canaries (NCa)	119,728	13.10	+6.22	13	+8
We Can (Podemos)	117,390	12.85	New	17	+17
United (Unidos)	50,353	5.51	+2.79	7	+1
United for Gran Canaria (UxGC)^{2}	44,369	4.86	+3.26	4	+4
Lanzarote Independents Party (PIL)	3,075	0.34	−0.26	1	−2
Majorero Progressive Party (PPMAJO)	2,909	0.32	−0.20	2	−1
Citizens–Party of the Citizenry (C's)	42,696	4.67	New	2	+2
Canaries Decides (IUC–LV–UP–ALTER)^{3}	18,803	2.06	−3.12	0	±0
Union, Progress and Democracy (UPyD)	7,973	0.87	−0.13	0	±0
Gomera Socialist Group (ASG)	5,972	0.65	New	10	+10
Canarian Nationalist Alternative (ANC)	5,893	0.64	−0.13	0	±0
Citizens of Democratic Centre (CCD)	5,079	0.56	New	0	±0
Canarian Green Party (PVerde)	4,768	0.52	New	0	±0
Socialists for Tenerife–Greens (SxTF–Verdes)	4,007	0.44	New	0	±0
Nationalist Canarian Centre (CCN)	3,996	0.44	New	0	±0
We Are Lanzarote (SomosLan)^{4}	3,157	0.35	+0.11	2	+1
More for Telde (+xT)	3,074	0.34	New	0	±0
Municipal Assemblies of Fuerteventura (AMF)	1,669	0.18	−0.09	0	−2
Yes We Can (SSP)	1,093	0.12	New	1	+1
Vox (Vox)	1,015	0.11	New	0	±0
San Borondón (SB)	956	0.10	New	0	±0
Communist Party of the Canarian People (PCPC)	948	0.10	−0.16	0	±0
Libertarian Party (P–LIB)	710	0.08	New	0	±0
New Fuerteventura (NF)	564	0.06	New	0	±0
Blank ballots	14,763	1.62	−0.93		
Total	913,743			155	−2
Valid votes	913,743	97.99	+0.61		
Invalid votes	18,734	2.01	−0.61		
Votes cast / turnout	932,477	60.99	−2.23		
Abstentions	596,366	39.01	+2.23		
Registered voters	1,528,843				
Sources
Footnotes: ^{1} Canarian Coalition–Canarian Nationalist Party results are compared to the combined totals of Canarian Coalition–Canarian Nationalist Party and Canarian Nationalist Party in the 2011 elections.; ^{2} United for Gran Canaria results are compared to the combined totals of Commitment to Gran Canaria and Citizens for Canarian Change in the 2011 elections.; ^{3} Canaries Decides results are compared to the combined totals of Canarian United Left, The Greens and Unity of the People in the 2011 elections.; ^{4} We Are Lanzarote results are compared to Citizens' Alternative 25 May totals in the 2011 elections.

Popular vote
CCa–PNC	18.44%
PSOE	18.25%
PP	17.94%
NCa	13.10%
Podemos	12.85%
Unidos	5.51%
C's	4.67%
Canarias Decide	2.06%
ASG	0.65%
SomosLan	0.35%
SSP	0.12%
Others	4.45%
Blank ballots	1.62%

Seats
CCa–PNC	26.45%
PSOE	23.23%
PP	16.77%
Podemos	10.97%
NCa	8.39%
ASG	6.45%
Unidos	4.52%
C's	1.29%
SomosLan	1.29%
SSP	0.65%

== Island control ==
The following table lists party control in the island councils. Gains for a party are highlighted in that party's colour.

Island	Population	Previous control	New control
El Hierro	10,675	Spanish Socialist Workers' Party (PSOE)	Independent Herrenian Group (AHI)
Fuerteventura	106,930	Canarian Coalition–Canarian Nationalist Party (CCa–PNC)	Canarian Coalition–Canarian Nationalist Party (CCa–PNC)
Gran Canaria	851,157	People's Party (PP)	New Canaries (NCa)
La Gomera	20,721	Gomera Socialist Group (ASG)	Gomera Socialist Group (ASG)
La Palma	83,456	Spanish Socialist Workers' Party (PSOE)	Spanish Socialist Workers' Party (PSOE)
Lanzarote	141,940	Canarian Coalition–Canarian Nationalist Party (CCa–PNC)	Canarian Coalition–Canarian Nationalist Party (CCa–PNC)
Tenerife	889,936	Canarian Coalition–Canarian Nationalist Party (CCa–PNC)	Canarian Coalition–Canarian Nationalist Party (CCa–PNC)

== Islands ==
=== El Hierro ===
← Summary of the 24 May 2015 Island Council of El Hierro election results →
Parties and alliances	Popular vote			Seats	
Parties and alliances	Votes	%	±pp	Total	+/−
Canarian Coalition–Independent Herrenian Group (CCa–AHI)	2,708	45.07	+5.64	6	±0
Spanish Socialist Workers' Party (PSOE)	1,498	24.93	−11.03	3	−2
People's Party (PP)	820	13.65	−5.98	2	±0
We Can (Podemos)	405	6.74	New	1	+1
New Canaries–Broad Front (NC–FA)	399	6.64	New	1	+1
Canaries Decides (IpH–IUC–LV–UP)^{1}	120	2.00	+0.29	0	±0
Blank ballots	58	0.97	+0.02		
Total	6,008			13	±0
Valid votes	6,008	98.14	−0.83		
Invalid votes	114	1.86	+0.83		
Votes cast / turnout	6,122	74.79	−0.89		
Abstentions	2,064	25.21	+0.89		
Registered voters	8,186				
Sources
Footnotes: ^{1} Canaries Decides results are compared to El Hierro Initiative–Canarian United Left totals in the 2011 election.

=== Fuerteventura ===
← Summary of the 24 May 2015 Island Council of Fuerteventura election results →
Parties and alliances	Popular vote			Seats	
Parties and alliances	Votes	%	±pp	Total	+/−
Canarian Coalition–Canarian Nationalist Party (CCa–PNC)	10,763	30.60	−5.40	9	±0
Spanish Socialist Workers' Party (PSOE)	6,183	17.58	+2.70	5	+1
People's Party (PP)	4,183	11.89	−6.20	3	−2
We Can (Podemos)	3,739	10.63	New	3	+3
Majorero Progressive Party (PPMAJO)	2,909	8.27	−5.55	2	−1
New Canaries–Broad Front–Independents of Fuerteventura (NC–IF)	2,039	5.80	+2.21	1	+1
Municipal Assemblies of Fuerteventura (AMF)	1,669	4.75	−2.60	0	−2
Citizens–Party of the Citizenry (C's)	1,032	2.93	New	0	±0
Canarian Nationalist Alternative (ANC)	776	2.21	New	0	±0
New Fuerteventura (NF)	564	1.60	New	0	±0
Canaries Decides (IUC–LV–UP–ALTER)^{1}	443	1.26	−1.77	0	±0
Union, Progress and Democracy (UPyD)	309	0.88	−0.05	0	±0
Blank ballots	560	1.59	−0.73		
Total	35,169			23	±0
Valid votes	35,169	97.40	+0.36		
Invalid votes	940	2.60	−0.36		
Votes cast / turnout	36,109	59.44	−4.66		
Abstentions	24,637	40.56	+4.66		
Registered voters	60,746				
Sources
Footnotes: ^{1} Canaries Decides results are compared to the combined totals of The Greens and Canarian United Left in the 2011 election.

=== Gran Canaria ===
← Summary of the 24 May 2015 Island Council of Gran Canaria election results →
Parties and alliances	Popular vote			Seats	
Parties and alliances	Votes	%	±pp	Total	+/−
New Canaries–Broad Front (NC–FA)	103,759	26.47	+11.14	9	+4
People's Party (PP)	68,714	17.53	−21.25	6	−8
Spanish Socialist Workers' Party (PSOE)	57,015	14.55	−6.19	5	−2
We Can (Podemos)	52,496	13.39	New	4	+4
United for Gran Canaria (UxGC)^{1}	44,369	11.32	+7.48	4	+4
Canarian Coalition–Canarian Nationalist Party (CCa–PNC)	21,807	5.56	−3.68	1	−2
Citizens–Party of the Citizenry (C's)	16,971	4.33	New	0	±0
Canaries Decides (IUC–LV–UP–ALTER)^{2}	5,742	1.46	−3.02	0	±0
Canarian Green Party (PVerde)	4,768	1.22	New	0	±0
Union, Progress and Democracy (UPyD)	3,298	0.84	−0.38	0	±0
More for Telde (+xT)	3,074	0.78	New	0	±0
Citizens of Democratic Centre (CCD)	2,674	0.68	New	0	±0
Vox (Vox)	1,015	0.26	New	0	±0
Canarian Nationalist Alternative (ANC)	806	0.21	−0.22	0	±0
Blank ballots	5,481	1.40	−1.53		
Total	391,989			29	±0
Valid votes	391,989	98.50	+1.64		
Invalid votes	5,971	1.50	−1.64		
Votes cast / turnout	397,960	61.65	−0.61		
Abstentions	247,601	38.35	+0.61		
Registered voters	645,561				
Sources
Footnotes: ^{1} United for Gran Canaria results are compared to the combined totals of Commitment to Gran Canaria and Citizens for Canarian Change in the 2011 election.; ^{2} Canaries Decides results are compared to the combined totals of The Greens, Canarian United Left and Unity of the People in the 2011 election.

=== La Gomera ===
← Summary of the 24 May 2015 Island Council of La Gomera election results →
Parties and alliances	Popular vote			Seats	
Parties and alliances	Votes	%	±pp	Total	+/−
Gomera Socialist Group (ASG)	5,972	50.19	New	10	+10
Spanish Socialist Workers' Party (PSOE)	1,816	15.26	−36.87	3	−7
People's Party (PP)	1,101	9.25	−17.28	1	−4
Yes We Can (SSP)	1,093	9.19	New	1	+1
New Canaries–Gomera Democratic Alternative (NC–ADGomera)	1,071	9.00	+4.85	1	+1
Canarian Coalition–Canarian Nationalist Party (CCa–PNC)	744	6.25	−6.39	1	−1
Union, Progress and Democracy (UPyD)	34	0.29	New	0	±0
Blank ballots	67	0.56	−0.51		
Total	11,898			17	±0
Valid votes	11,898	98.42	+0.11		
Invalid votes	191	1.58	−0.11		
Votes cast / turnout	12,089	76.96	−1.13		
Abstentions	3,620	23.04	+1.13		
Registered voters	15,709				

=== La Palma ===
← Summary of the 24 May 2015 Island Council of La Palma election results →
Parties and alliances	Popular vote			Seats	
Parties and alliances	Votes	%	±pp	Total	+/−
Spanish Socialist Workers' Party (PSOE)	13,186	31.45	+6.97	8	+2
Canarian Coalition–Canarian Nationalist Party (CCa–PNC)	12,340	29.43	−10.22	7	−2
People's Party (PP)	9,617	22.94	−5.29	5	−1
We Can (Podemos)	2,115	5.04	New	1	+1
Citizens–Party of the Citizenry (C's)	1,236	2.95	New	0	±0
Canaries Decides (IUC–LV–UP–ALTER)^{1}	1,223	2.92	−0.43	0	±0
New Canaries–Broad Front (NC–FA)	1,136	2.71	+0.51	0	±0
Union, Progress and Democracy (UPyD)	452	1.08	+0.36	0	±0
Blank ballots	625	1.49	+0.12		
Total	41,930			21	±0
Valid votes	41,930	97.66	−0.39		
Invalid votes	1,003	2.34	+0.39		
Votes cast / turnout	42,933	66.67	−4.44		
Abstentions	21,464	33.33	+4.44		
Registered voters	64,397				
Sources
Footnotes: ^{1} Canaries Decides results are compared to the combined totals of The Greens and Canarian United Left in the 2011 election.

=== Lanzarote ===
← Summary of the 24 May 2015 Island Council of Lanzarote election results →
Parties and alliances	Popular vote			Seats	
Parties and alliances	Votes	%	±pp	Total	+/−
Canarian Coalition–Canarian Nationalist Party (CCa–PNC)	11,148	24.22	−7.04	7	−2
Spanish Socialist Workers' Party (PSOE)	8,805	19.13	+3.46	5	+1
We Can (Podemos)	5,749	12.49	New	3	+3
People's Party (PP)	5,509	11.97	−10.37	3	−3
We Are Lanzarote (SomosLan)^{1}	3,157	6.86	+1.72	2	+1
Lanzarote Independents Party (PIL)	3,075	6.68	−6.04	1	−2
New Canaries–Broad Front (NC–FA)	3,032	6.59	+2.42	1	+1
Citizens–Party of the Citizenry (C's)	2,452	5.33	New	1	+1
San Borondón (SB)	956	2.08	New	0	±0
Canaries Decides (IUC–LV–UP–ALTER)^{2}	900	1.96	+0.14	0	±0
Union, Progress and Democracy (UPyD)	189	0.41	−0.52	0	±0
Blank ballots	1,062	2.31	−1.89		
Total	46,034			23	±0
Valid votes	46,034	98.29	+1.86		
Invalid votes	801	1.71	−1.86		
Votes cast / turnout	46,835	52.48	−2.38		
Abstentions	42,411	47.52	+2.38		
Registered voters	89,246				
Sources
Footnotes: ^{1} We Are Lanzarote results are compared to Citizens' Alternative 25 May totals in the 2011 election.; ^{2} Canaries Decides results are compared to Canarian United Left totals in the 2011 election.

=== Tenerife ===
← Summary of the 24 May 2015 Island Council of Tenerife election results →
Parties and alliances	Popular vote			Seats	
Parties and alliances	Votes	%	±pp	Total	+/−
Canarian Coalition–Canarian Nationalist Party (CCa–PNC)	108,972	28.62	−9.72	10	−5
Spanish Socialist Workers' Party (PSOE)	78,255	20.55	+0.82	7	±0
People's Party (PP)	73,952	19.42	−5.44	6	−3
We Can (Podemos)	52,886	13.89	New	5	+5
Citizens–Party of the Citizenry (C's)	21,005	5.52	New	1	+1
Canaries Decides (IUC–LV–UP–ALTER)^{1}	10,375	2.73	−4.01	0	±0
For Tenerife–New Canaries–Broad Front (XTF–NC)	8,292	2.18	New	0	±0
Canarian Nationalist Alternative (ANC)	4,311	1.13	−0.23	0	±0
Socialists for Tenerife–Greens (SxTF–Verdes)	4,007	1.05	New	0	±0
Nationalist Canarian Centre (CCN)	3,996	1.05	New	0	±0
Union, Progress and Democracy (UPyD)	3,691	0.97	+0.10	0	±0
Citizens of Democratic Centre (CCD)	2,405	0.63	New	0	±0
Communist Party of the Canarian People (PCPC)	948	0.25	−0.05	0	±0
Libertarian Party (P–LIB)	710	0.19	New	0	±0
Blank ballots	6,910	1.82	−0.40		
Total	380,715			29	−2
Valid votes	380,715	97.51	−0.38		
Invalid votes	9,714	2.49	+0.38		
Votes cast / turnout	390,429	60.53	−3.31		
Abstentions	254,569	39.47	+3.31		
Registered voters	644,998				
Sources
Footnotes: ^{1} Canaries Decides results are compared to the combined totals of United Left–The Greens–Socialists for Tenerife and The Greens in the 2011 election.
