= 2023 Canarian island council elections =

Elections in the Spanish region of the Canary Islands

Island council elections were held in the Canary Islands on 28 May 2023 to elect the 12th Island Councils (the cabildos insulares) of El Hierro, Fuerteventura, Gran Canaria, La Gomera, La Palma, Lanzarote and Tenerife. All 157 seats in the seven island councils were up for election. They were held concurrently with regional elections in twelve autonomous communities (including the Canary Islands) and local elections all across Spain.

== Overall ==
← Summary of the 28 May 2023 Canarian island council election results →
Parties and alliances	Popular vote			Seats	
Parties and alliances	Votes	%	±pp	Total	+/−
Spanish Socialist Workers' Party (PSOE)	226,725	24.86	−2.62	43	−6
Canarian Coalition (CCa)^{1}	187,207	20.52	−1.19	41	+3
People's Party (PP)	180,164	19.75	+4.40	31	+6
New Canaries–Canarist Broad Front (NC–FAC)	110,969	12.17	−0.08	13	+2
Vox (Vox)	67,098	7.36	+5.06	6	+6
United Yes We Can (Podemos–IUC–SSP)^{2}	34,342	3.76	−4.99	1	−9
Drago Greens Canaries (DVC)	26,566	2.91	New	0	±0
United for Gran Canaria (UxGC)	17,899	1.96	New	0	±0
Animalist Party with the Environment (PACMA)^{3}	11,604	1.27	+0.21	0	±0
Gomera Socialist Group (ASG)	6,847	0.75	−0.02	11	±0
Citizens–Party of the Citizenry (CS)	4,675	0.51	−5.60	0	−4
Let's Talk Now (Hablemos Ahora)	4,232	0.46	New	0	±0
Municipal Assemblies of Fuerteventura (AMF)	3,611	0.40	New	2	+2
Gather Sustainable Canaries (Reunir)	2,835	0.31	New	0	±0
Canaries Now–Communist Party of the Canarian People (ANC–UP–PCPC)^{4}	2,182	0.24	−0.19	0	±0
Seniors in Action (3e)	2,031	0.22	+0.17	0	±0
Initiative for La Gomera (IxLG)^{5}	1,663	0.18	+0.01	2	±0
Independent Herrenian Group (AHI)	1,574	0.17	+0.02	4	+1
Herrenian Assembly (AH)	1,249	0.14	−0.03	3	−1
Stand Up Lanzarote (LEP)	1,019	0.11	New	0	±0
Democratic Union of the Canary Islands (UDC)	924	0.10	+0.03	0	±0
Electoral Alternative Movement (MAE)	771	0.08	New	0	±0
With You, We Are Democracy (Contigo)	706	0.08	−0.04	0	±0
Platform for Fuerteventura (PxF)	502	0.06	New	0	±0
More Canaries (+C)	134	0.01	New	0	±0
Blank ballots	14,658	1.61	+0.54		
Total	912,187			157	±0
Valid votes	912,187	98.52	−0.66		
Invalid votes	13,748	1.48	+0.66		
Votes cast / turnout	925,935	57.29	−0.40		
Abstentions	690,325	42.71	+0.40		
Registered voters	1,616,260				
Sources
Footnotes: ^{1} Canarian Coalition results are compared to Canarian Coalition–PNC–United for Gran Canaria totals in the 2019 elections.; ^{2} United Yes We Can results are compared to the combined totals of Yes We Can Canaries and Canarian United Left in the 2019 elections.; ^{3} Animalist Party with the Environment results are compared to Animalist Party Against Mistreatment of Animals totals in the 2019 elections.; ^{4} Canaries Now–Communist Party of the Canarian People results are compared to the combined totals of Canaries Now and Communist Party of the Canarian People in the 2019 elections.; ^{5} Initiative for La Gomera results are compared to Yes We Can totals in La Gomera in the 2019 elections.

Popular vote
PSOE	24.86%
CCa	20.52%
PP	19.75%
NC–FAC	12.17%
Vox	7.36%
USP	3.76%
DVC	2.91%
UxGC	1.96%
PACMA	1.27%
ASG	0.75%
AMF	0.40%
IxLG	0.18%
AHI	0.17%
AH	0.14%
Others	2.19%
Blank ballots	1.61%

Popular vote
PSOE	27.39%
CCa	26.11%
PP	19.75%
NC–FAC	8.28%
ASG	7.01%
Vox	3.82%
AHI	2.55%
AH	1.91%
AMF	1.27%
IxLG	1.27%
USP	0.64%

== Island control ==
The following table lists party control in the island councils. Gains for a party are highlighted in that party's colour.

Island	Population	Previous control	New control
El Hierro	11,423	Spanish Socialist Workers' Party (PSOE)	Independent Herrenian Group (AHI) (PSOE in 2023)
Fuerteventura	120,021	Spanish Socialist Workers' Party (PSOE)	Canarian Coalition (CCa)
Gran Canaria	853,262	New Canaries (NCa)	New Canaries (NCa)
La Gomera	21,798	Gomera Socialist Group (ASG)	Gomera Socialist Group (ASG)
La Palma	83,439	People's Party (PP)	Canarian Coalition (CCa)
Lanzarote	156,112	Spanish Socialist Workers' Party (PSOE)	Canarian Coalition (CCa)
Tenerife	931,646	Spanish Socialist Workers' Party (PSOE)	Canarian Coalition (CCa)

== Islands ==
=== El Hierro ===
← Summary of the 26 May 2023 Island Council of El Hierro election results →
Parties and alliances	Popular vote			Seats	
Parties and alliances	Votes	%	±pp	Total	+/−
Independent Herrenian Group (AHI)	1,574	26.36	+5.43	4	+1
Spanish Socialist Workers' Party (PSOE)	1,553	26.00	−0.85	3	−1
Herrenian Assembly (AH)	1,249	20.91	−3.06	3	−1
People's Party (PP)	865	14.48	+4.26	2	+1
United Left–Gather Canaries (IU–Reunir)^{1}	477	7.98	+0.50	1	±0
Vox (Vox)	85	1.42	New	0	±0
Seniors in Action (3e)	78	1.31	New	0	±0
Blank ballots	91	1.52	+0.95		
Total	6,118			13	±0
Valid votes	5,972	97.61	−1.70		
Invalid votes	146	2.39	+1.70		
Votes cast / turnout	6,118	70.26	−4.99		
Abstentions	2,590	29.74	+4.99		
Registered voters	8,708				
Sources
Footnotes: ^{1} United Left–Gather Canaries results are compared to El Hierro Can–Canarian United Left totals in the 2019 election.

=== Fuerteventura ===
← Summary of the 28 May 2023 Island Council of Fuerteventura election results →
Parties and alliances	Popular vote			Seats	
Parties and alliances	Votes	%	±pp	Total	+/−
Canarian Coalition (CCa)^{1}	10,681	27.84	+2.47	8	+1
People's Party (PP)	7,184	18.72	+4.57	5	+1
Spanish Socialist Workers' Party (PSOE)	6,764	17.63	−5.45	5	−2
New Canaries–Canarist Broad Front (NC–FAC)	4,873	12.70	+1.86	3	±0
Municipal Assemblies of Fuerteventura (AMF)	3,611	9.41	New	2	+2
Vox (Vox)	1,904	4.96	+2.12	0	±0
Drago Greens Canaries (DVC)	1,201	3.13	New	0	±0
United Yes We Can (Podemos–IUC–SSP)^{2}	763	1.99	−5.00	0	−2
Platform for Fuerteventura (PxF)	502	1.31	New	0	±0
With You, We Are Democracy (Contigo)	276	0.72	−0.53	0	±0
Blank ballots	611	1.59	+0.17		
Total	38,370			23	±0
Valid votes	38,370	97.38	−0.84		
Invalid votes	1,033	2.62	+0.84		
Votes cast / turnout	39,403	55.96	−0.73		
Abstentions	31,008	44.04	+0.73		
Registered voters	70,411				
Sources
Footnotes: ^{1} Canarian Coalition results are compared to Canarian Coalition–Canarian Nationalist Party totals in the 2019 election.; ^{2} United Yes We Can results are compared to Yes We Can Canaries totals in the 2019 election.

=== Gran Canaria ===
← Summary of the 28 May 2023 Island Council of Gran Canaria election results →
Parties and alliances	Popular vote			Seats	
Parties and alliances	Votes	%	±pp	Total	+/−
New Canaries–Canarist Broad Front (NC–FAC)	90,385	24.44	−1.30	8	±0
Spanish Socialist Workers' Party (PSOE)	80,688	21.82	−2.71	8	±0
People's Party (PP)	75,520	20.42	+2.60	7	+1
Canarian Coalition (CCa)^{1}	33,320	9.01	−1.67	3	±0
Vox (Vox)	33,054	8.94	+6.46	3	+3
United for Gran Canaria (UxGC)	17,899	4.84	New	0	±0
United Yes We Can (Podemos–IUC–SSP)^{2}	12,404	3.35	−4.44	0	−2
Drago Greens Canaries (DVC)	6,521	1.76	New	0	±0
Let's Talk Now (Hablemos Ahora)	4,232	1.14	New	0	±0
Animalist Party with the Environment (PACMA)^{3}	3,845	1.04	−0.12	0	±0
Gather Sustainable Canaries (Reunir)	1,972	0.53	New	0	±0
Canaries Now–Communist Party of the Canarian People (ANC–UP–PCPC)^{4}	1,301	0.35	−0.21	0	±0
Citizens–Party of the Citizenry (CS)	1,199	0.32	−6.61	0	−2
Seniors in Action (3e)	1,074	0.29	New	0	±0
With You, We Are Democracy (Contigo)	430	0.12	+0.04	0	±0
Blank ballots	5,938	1.61	+0.57		
Total	369,782			29	±0
Valid votes	369,782	99.58	−0.60		
Invalid votes	5,340	1.42	+0.60		
Votes cast / turnout	375,122	55.83	−0.38		
Abstentions	296,737	44.17	+0.38		
Registered voters	671,859				
Sources
Footnotes: ^{1} Canarian Coalition results are compared to Canarian Coalition–United for Gran Canaria totals in the 2019 election.; ^{2} United Yes We Can results are compared to the combined totals of Yes We Can Canaries and Canarian United Left in the 2019 election.; ^{3} Animalist Party with the Environment results are compared to Animalist Party Against Mistreatment of Animals totals in the 2019 election.; ^{4} Canaries Now–Communist Party of the Canarian People results are compared to the combined totals of Canaries Now and Communist Party of the Canarian People in the 2019 election.

=== La Gomera ===
← Summary of the 28 May 2023 Island Council of La Gomera election results →
Parties and alliances	Popular vote			Seats	
Parties and alliances	Votes	%	±pp	Total	+/−
Gomera Socialist Group (ASG)	6,847	58.49	+1.01	11	±0
Spanish Socialist Workers' Party (PSOE)	1,774	15.15	+0.31	3	±0
Initiative for La Gomera (IxLG)^{1}	1,663	14.21	+1.39	2	±0
Canarian Coalition (CCa)^{2}	701	5.99	+0.44	1	±0
People's Party (PP)	411	3.51	−0.95	0	±0
Vox (Vox)	195	1.67	New	0	±0
Blank ballots	116	0.99	+0.33		
Total	11,707			17	±0
Valid votes	11,707	98.24	−0.97		
Invalid votes	210	1.76	+0.97		
Votes cast / turnout	11,917	73.16	−2.98		
Abstentions	4,372	26.84	+2.98		
Registered voters	16,289				
Sources
Footnotes: ^{1} Initiative for La Gomera results are compared to Yes We Can totals in the 2019 election.; ^{2} Canarian Coalition results are compared to Canarian Coalition–Canarian Nationalist Party totals in the 2019 election.

=== La Palma ===
← Summary of the 28 May 2023 Island Council of La Palma election results →
Parties and alliances	Popular vote			Seats	
Parties and alliances	Votes	%	±pp	Total	+/−
Canarian Coalition (CCa)^{1}	20,501	46.85	+16.95	11	+3
Spanish Socialist Workers' Party (PSOE)	9,016	20.60	−8.59	5	−2
People's Party (PP)	8,833	20.18	−5.30	5	−1
New Canaries–Canarist Broad Front (NC–FAC)	1,178	2.69	−0.80	0	±0
Drago Greens Canaries (DVC)	916	2.09	New	0	±0
Vox (Vox)	808	1.85	+0.18	0	±0
United Yes We Can (Podemos–IUC–SSP)^{2}	800	1.83	−3.89	0	±0
Electoral Alternative Movement (MAE)	771	1.76	New	0	±0
Citizens–Party of the Citizenry (CS)	408	0.93	−1.48	0	±0
More Canaries (+C)	134	0.31	New	0	±0
Blank ballots	397	0.91	−0.12		
Total	43,762			21	±0
Valid votes	43,762	98.64	−0.09		
Invalid votes	602	1.36	+0.09		
Votes cast / turnout	44,364	69.08	+0.99		
Abstentions	19,854	30.92	−0.99		
Registered voters	64,218				
Sources
Footnotes: ^{1} Canarian Coalition results are compared to Canarian Coalition–Canarian Nationalist Party totals in the 2019 election.; ^{2} United Yes We Can results are compared to the combined totals of Yes We Can Canaries and Canarian United Left in the 2019 election.

=== Lanzarote ===
← Summary of the 28 May 2023 Island Council of Lanzarote election results →
Parties and alliances	Popular vote			Seats	
Parties and alliances	Votes	%	±pp	Total	+/−
Canarian Coalition (CCa)^{1}	14,390	28.93	+1.21	8	±0
Spanish Socialist Workers' Party (PSOE)	14,321	28.80	+0.53	8	−1
People's Party (PP)	8,531	17.15	+3.36	4	±0
New Canaries–Canarist Broad Front (NC–FAC)^{2}	4,357	8.76	+4.01	2	+2
Vox (Vox)	3,044	6.12	+3.73	1	+1
United Yes We Can (Podemos–IUC–SSP)^{3}	2,078	4.18	−4.67	0	−2
Stand Up Lanzarote (LEP)	1,019	2.05	New	0	±0
Drago Greens Canaries (DVC)	951	1.91	New	0	±0
Blank ballots	1,042	2.10	+0.61		
Total	49,733			23	±0
Valid votes	49,733	98.48	−0.63		
Invalid votes	766	1.52	+0.63		
Votes cast / turnout	50,499	50.18	−1.67		
Abstentions	50,128	49.82	+1.67		
Registered voters	100,627				
Sources
Footnotes: ^{1} Canarian Coalition results are compared to Canarian Coalition–Canarian Nationalist Party totals in the 2019 election.; ^{2} New Canaries–Canarist Broad Front results are compared to We Are Lanzarote–New Canaries–Broad Front totals in the 2019 election.; ^{3} United Yes We Can results are compared to the combined totals of Stand Up Lanzarote–Yes We Can and Canarian United Left in the 2019 election.

=== Tenerife ===
← Summary of the 28 May 2023 Island Council of Tenerife election results →
Parties and alliances	Popular vote			Seats	
Parties and alliances	Votes	%	±pp	Total	+/−
Spanish Socialist Workers' Party (PSOE)	112,609	28.66	−2.17	11	±0
Canarian Coalition (CCa)^{1}	107,614	27.39	−3.68	10	−1
People's Party (PP)	78,820	20.06	+7.45	8	+4
Vox (Vox)	28,008	7.13	+4.88	2	+2
United Yes We Can (Podemos–IUC–SSP)^{2}	17,820	4.54	−5.91	0	−3
Drago Greens Canaries (DVC)	16,977	4.32	New	0	±0
New Canaries–Canarist Broad Front (NC–FAC)	10,176	2.59	+0.71	0	±0
Animalist Party with the Environment (PACMA)^{3}	7,759	1.97	+0.59	0	±0
Citizens–Party of the Citizenry (CS)	3,068	0.78	−5.50	0	−2
Democratic Union of the Canary Islands (UDC)	924	0.24	+0.08	0	±0
Canaries Now–Communist Party of the Canarian People (ANC–UP–PCPC)^{4}	881	0.22	−0.22	0	±0
Seniors in Action (3e)	879	0.22	+0.11	0	±0
Gather Sustainable Canaries (Reunir)	863	0.22	New	0	±0
Blank ballots	6,463	1.65	+0.61		
Total	392,861			31	±0
Valid votes	392,861	98.58	−0.75		
Invalid votes	5,651	1.42	+0.75		
Votes cast / turnout	398,512	58.25	−0.18		
Abstentions	285,636	41.75	+0.18		
Registered voters	684,148				
Sources
Footnotes: ^{1} Canarian Coalition results are compared to Canarian Coalition–Canarian Nationalist Party totals in the 2019 election.; ^{2} United Yes We Can results are compared to the combined totals of Yes We Can Canaries and Canarian United Left in the 2019 election.; ^{3} Animalist Party with the Environment results are compared to Animalist Party Against Mistreatment of Animals totals in the 2019 election.; ^{4} Canaries Now–Communist Party of the Canarian People results are compared to the combined totals of Canaries Now and Communist Party of the Canarian People in the 2019 election.
