= Herrenian Assembly =

Herrenian Assembly Asamblea Herreña
- Leader: David Cabrera de León
- Founded: 18 April 2019
- Split from: Independent Herrenian Group
- Ideology: El Hierro regionalism Canarian nationalism Federalism
- Political position: Centre
- Cabildo of El Hierro: 3 / 13
- Spanish Senate: 0 / 266
- Canarian Parliament: 0 / 60
- Town councillors: 8 / 33

Website
- coalicioncanaria.org/ahi

The Herrenian Assembly (Spanish: Asamblea Herreña, AH) is a regionalist and Canarian nationalist political party in El Hierro. AH was created in 2019 as the For El Hierro Electoral Group (Spanish: Agrupación Electoral por El Hierro, AExEH) by David Cabrera de León, a former member of the Independent Herrenian Group.

In February 2023, ahead of the 2023 Canarian regional election, the party signed an electoral alliance with the Gomera Socialist Group.

== Electoral performance ==
=== Cabildo of El Hierro ===
Cabildo of El Hierro
Election	Leading candidate	Votes	%	Seats	+/–	Government
2019	David Cabrera de León	1,513	23.97 (#2)	4 / 13	4	Coalition (PSOE–AExEH)
2023	David Cabrera de León	1,249	20.91 (#3)	3 / 13	1	Opposition

== See also ==
- Canarian nationalism
- El Hierro
