= United for Gran Canaria =

United for Gran Canaria Unidos por Gran Canaria
- Founded: 2015
- Split from: People's Party of the Canary Islands
- Ideology: Liberalism; Gran Canaria regionalism
- Political position: Centre to centre-right
- Canarian Parliament: 0 / 70
- Island councils: 1 / 155
- Town councillors: 11 / 1,382

United for Gran Canaria (Spanish: Unidos por Gran Canaria, UxGC) is a Canary Island-based political party founded by former People's Party leader in Gran Canaria José Miguel Bravo de Laguna. Ahead of the 2015 Canarian regional election, it ran in the United electoral alliance (Spanish: Unidos) formed by Nationalist Canarian Centre, Citizens for Change, Commitment for Gran Canaria, Lanzarote Independents Party, Majorero Progressive Party, Democratic and Progressive Party and Independent Group of Moya.

The party gained its only MP in the Canarian Parliament after Lucas Bravo de Laguna Cabrera, who had run as an independent for the 2019 Canarian regional election within the Canarian Coalition banner, became the General Secretary of the Party.

== Member parties ==
- Nationalist Canarian Centre (CCN)
- Citizens for Canarian Change (CIUCA)
- Commitment for Gran Canaria (CGCa)
- Lanzarote Independents Party (PIL)
- Majorero Progressive Party (PPMAJO)
- Democratic and Progressive Party (PDP)
- Independent Center Group of Moya (ACIM)

== Electoral performance ==
=== Parliament of the Canary Islands ===
Parliament of the Canary Islands
Election	Island constituencies		Regional constituency		Seats	+/–	Government
Election	Votes	%	Votes	%	Seats	+/–	Government
2015	32,868	3.59 (#7)			0 / 60	0	Extra-parliamentary
2019	Within CCa–PNC				1 / 70	1	Opposition
2023	17,153	1.88 (#8)	13,760	1.51 (#8)	0 / 70	1	Extra-parliamentary

=== Cabildo de Gran Canaria ===
Cabildo de Gran Canaria
Election	Votes	%	Seats	+/–	Government
2015	44,369	11.32 (#5)	4 / 29	4	Opposition
2019	Within CCa–UxGC		1 / 29	3	Opposition
2023	17,872	4.83 (#6)	0 / 29	1	Extra-parliamentary
