= Canaries Decides =

Canaries Decides Canarias Decide
- Founded: 2015
- Dissolved: 2016
- Merger of: ICU (2015); LV; UP; ALTER
- Political position: Left-wing

Canaries Decides (Spanish: Canarias Decide) was a Canary Island-based electoral alliance formed in 2015 by The Greens, Unity of the People and Republican Alternative. United Canarian Left was also a member of the alliance in the 2015 Canarian regional election, but contested the 2015 general election separately.

== Member parties ==
- United Canarian Left (ICU) (in the 2015 Canarian regional election)
- The Greens (LV)
- Unity of the People (UP)
- Republican Alternative (ALTER)
