= Gana Fuerteventura =

Fuerteventura Wins Gana Fuerteventura
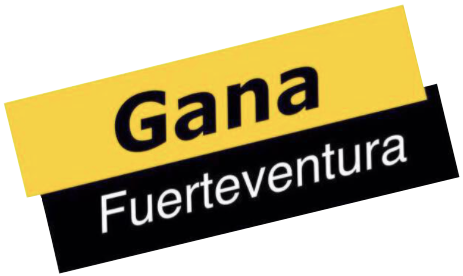
- Leader: Domingo González Arroyo
- Founded: 2019
- Merged into: Majorero Progressive Party; Unión del Pueblo Majorero
- Headquarters: C/ Avenida Juan de Bethencourt, Nº 91- Bajo (Puerto del Rosario)
- Ideology: Insularism; Centrism; Progressivism; Liberalism; Spanish patriotism Monarchism
- Political position: Centre
- Local seats: 4 / 104
- Cabildo of Fuerteventura: 0 / 23

Fuerteventura Wins (Spanish: Gana Fuerteventura) is an island-wide electoral coalition on the island of Fuerteventura. It defends a greater relevance of the island in the whole of the Canary Islands. It is currently led by Domingo González Arroyo, after the union of his Majorero Progressive Party (PPMAJO) with the Union of the Majorero People, led by Águeda Montelongo González.

It currently governs in the municipality of La Oliva.
