= Municipal Assemblies of Fuerteventura =

Municipal Assemblies of Fuerteventura Asambleas Municipales de Fuerteventura
- Abbreviation: AMF
- Founded: 2007
- Registered: 6 June 2008
- Ideology: Canarian nationalism

Website
- www.amffuerteventura.org

The Municipal Assemblies of Fuerteventura (Spanish: Asambleas Municipales de Fuerteventura, AMF) is a political party in the Canary Islands, based in the island of Fuerteventura. It contested the 2011 and 2015 Spanish general elections in electoral alliance with the People's Party for the Spanish Senate.
