= Unity of the People =

Unity of the People Unidad del Pueblo
- Founded: 1998
- Ideology: Canarian nationalism Socialism; Canarian independence Euroscepticism; Pacifism
- Political position: Left-wing
- National affiliation: Ahora Repúblicas
- Regional affiliation: Ahora Canarias

Website
- unidaddelpueblo.info

Unidad del Pueblo (English: Unity of the People; UP) is a Canary Islands left-wing nationalist party.

== Objectives ==
UP seeks independence for the Canary Islands and building a socialist society. The party defends a leading paper of the working class in the process of achieving its goals.

== History ==
UP was formed by former members of other left-wing Canarian nationalist political parties. Unidad del Pueblo supported Alternativa Popular Canaria (APC) from 2002 to 2005, when political differences between the two organizations arise. UP gained a town councillor in the 1999 and 2003 local elections in Santa Lucía de Tirajana.

Since 2007 UP began to present lists in all the elections held in the Canary Islands. The party achieved 1,400 votes in the regional elections of that year and 1,800 in the municipal ones, losing the only councilman the party had. In 2009, it was one of the parties supporting the candidacy Iniciativa Internacionalista in the European elections. In the European elections of 2014 UP supported the coalition The Peoples Decide. In the local elections of 2015 the party ran in coalition with United Canarian Left, Republican Alternative and The Greens, gaining one town councillor (Antonio Ordoñez Sánchez) in Santa Lucía de Tirajana.
