= Majorero Progressive Party =

Majorero Progressive Party Partido Progresista Majorero
- Leader: Domingo González Arroyo
- Founded: 2009
- Dissolved: 2019
- Headquarters: C/ Avenida Juan de Bethencourt, Nº 91- Bajo (Puerto del Rosario)
- Ideology: Insularism; Progressivism
- Political position: Centre
- National affiliation: Unidos (2015)
- Local seats: 9 / 100
- Cabildo of Fuerteventura: 1 / 14

Website
- www.partidoprogresistamajorero.es

Majorero Progressive Party (Spanish: Partido Progresista Majorero, PPMAJO) was a centrist insularist political party representing Fuerteventura, and island in the Canary Islands. It was founded and led by Domingo González Arroyo, who founded it after leaving the PP.

In March 2019, it joined the Unión del Pueblo Majorero (led by Águeda Montelongo) to form Gana Fuerteventura.
