= Opinion polling for the 2023 Spanish local elections (Canary Islands) =

In the run up to the 2023 Spanish local elections, various organisations carried out opinion polling to gauge voting intention in local entities in Spain. Results of such polls for municipalities and island cabildos in the Canary Islands are displayed in this article. The date range for these opinion polls is from the previous local elections, held on 26 May 2019, to the day the next elections were held, on 28 May 2023.

Polls are listed in reverse chronological order, showing the most recent first and using the dates when the survey fieldwork was done, as opposed to the date of publication. Where the fieldwork dates are unknown, the date of publication is given instead. The highest percentage figure in each polling survey is displayed with its background shaded in the leading party's colour. If a tie ensues, this is applied to the figures with the highest percentages. The "Lead" columns on the right shows the percentage-point difference between the parties with the highest percentages in a given poll.

== Municipalities ==
=== Adeje ===
Polling firm/Commissioner	Fieldwork date	Sample size	Turnout	PSOE	CCa	USP	PP	CS	Vox	Lead
2023 municipal election	28 May 2023	—N/a	41.6	54.0; 13	22.6; 5	6.3; 1	7.6; 1	–	6.7; 1	31.4
EM-Analytics/GMG	1 Sep–13 Mar 2023	471	?	53.4; 12	21.7; 5	6.3; 1	12.4; 3	2.7; 0	1.9; 2	31.7
2019 municipal election	26 May 2019	—N/a	53.4	60.2; 14	17.4; 4	8.3; 2	7.6; 1	4.3; 0	–	42.8

=== Antigua ===
Polling firm/Commissioner	Fieldwork date	Sample size	Turnout	ALxAN	PP	CCa	PSOE	NCa	CS	USP	CSD	AMF	Lead
2023 municipal election	28 May 2023	—N/a	60.4	36.3; 7	17.8; 3	15.5; 3	5.4; 1	–	–	–	5.8; 1	13.4; 2	13.0
Perfiles/Radio Insular	24 Oct–3 Nov 2022	600	?	31.0– 32.0; 7	18.0– 19.0; 4	12.0– 13.0; 2	15.0– 16.0; 3	6.0– 7.0; 1	–	3.0– 4.0; 0	–	(Note: Within NCa.)	13.0
2019 municipal election	26 May 2019	—N/a	57.3	26.0; 5	20.2; 4	13.7; 2	12.3; 2	9.4; 2	7.3; 1	5.5; 1	1.3; 0		5.8

=== Arona ===
Polling firm/Commissioner	Fieldwork date	Sample size	Turnout	PSOE	CCa	PP	CxA	USP	CS	Vox	NCa	+PA	Lead
2023 municipal election	28 May 2023	—N/a	38.8	29.3; 8	16.4; 5	16.8; 5	–	2.1; 0	–	8.6; 2	5.2; 1	15.3; 4	12.5
EM-Analytics/GMG	19 May–14 Aug 2022	702	?	46.8; 14	15.9; 4	14.7; 4	7.2; 2	5.5; 1	2.8; 0	2.4; 0	–	–	30.9
2019 municipal election	26 May 2019	—N/a	37.9	47.8; 14	15.1; 4	13.3; 3	6.8; 2	6.6; 1	5.2; 1	–	–	–	32.7

=== Arrecife ===
Polling firm/Commissioner	Fieldwork date	Sample size	Turnout	CCa	PP	PSOE	USP	NCa	CS	ASL	LAVA	Vox	Lead
2023 municipal election	28 May 2023	—N/a	42.0	23.0; 7	24.2; 7	28.1; 9	4.2; 0	4.7; 0	–	(Note: Within CCa.)	–	7.6; 2	3.9
EM-Analytics/GMG	10 May–18 Sep 2022	?	?	29.7; 9	19.0; 6	15.6; 5	9.4; 2	7.0; 2	1.4; 0	3.0; 0	2.9; 0	5.4; 1	10.7
2019 municipal election	26 May 2019	—N/a	44.7	28.5; 9	17.2; 6	17.2; 5	9.1; 3	6.2; 2	4.6; 0	3.9; 0	2.6; 0	2.5; 0	11.3

=== La Oliva ===
Polling firm/Commissioner	Fieldwork date	Sample size	Turnout	CCa	EM	PSOE	GF	NCa	Podemos	PP	Vox	Lead
2023 municipal election	28 May 2023	—N/a	49.8	29.3; 7	10.2; 2	23.1; 6	–	5.7; 1	–	23.0; 5	3.8; 0	6.2
Perfiles/Radio Insular	24 Oct–3 Nov 2022	600	?	28.0– 29.0; 8/9	14.0– 15.0; 4/5	13.0– 14.0; 4	6.0– 7.0; 1/2	4.0– 5.0; 0/1	3.0– 4.0; 0	11.0– 12.0; 3/4	3.0– 4.0; 0	14.0
2019 municipal election	26 May 2019	—N/a	51.0	24.6; 7	16.9; 4	16.2; 4	12.7; 3	6.3; 1	6.1; 1	6.0; 1	–	7.7

=== Las Palmas de Gran Canaria ===
Color key:

Poll conducted after legal ban on opinion polls

Polling firm/Commissioner	Fieldwork date	Sample size	Turnout	PSOE	PP	USP	CS	NCa	CCa	Vox	UxGC	DVC	Lead
2023 municipal election	28 May 2023	—N/a	50.8	33.1; 11	27.2; 7	5.4; 1	0.4; 0	6.1; 2	5.2; 1	11.3; 4	3.3; 0	1.9; 0	5.9
Sigma Dos/RTVE–FORTA	28 May 2023	?	?	32.0; 10/11	25.5; 8/9	6.8; 2	–	9.1; 3	7.1; 2	5.0; 1	6.1; 1/2	–	6.5
TSA/Canarias7	1–18 May 2023	?	?	33.1; 11/12	25.9; 8/9	10.1; 3	–	11.2; 3/4	5.1; 1	4.9; 0/1	5.0; 1	–	7.2
Perfiles/La Provincia	12–17 May 2023	?	?	27.0– 28.0; 9/10	23.0– 24.0; 8/9	6.0– 7.0; 2	3.0– 4.0; 0	9.0– 10.0; 3	11.0– 12.0; 4	5.0– 6.0; 1/2	4.0– 5.0; 0/2	–	4.0
Ágora Integral/Canarias Ahora	1–14 May 2023	800	?	33.0; 11/12	29.6; 10	6.9; 2	0.6; 0	9.7; 3	4.3; 0	5.0; 0/1	7.6; 2	1.4; 0	3.4
EM-Analytics/GMG	5 Apr–13 May 2023	415	?	32.1; 11	28.0; 9	8.2; 2	1.3; 0	11.3; 3	5.3; 1	5.5; 1	5.8; 2	2.2; 0	4.1
Sigma Dos/Antena 3	27 Apr 2023	?	?	33.8; 11/12	31.1; 10	6.4; 2	–	? 1	? 3	5.8; 1/2	–	–	2.7
Ágora Integral/Canarias Ahora	5–23 Apr 2023	1,000	?	32.8; 11/12	29.2; 10	6.9; 2	1.3; 0	9.9; 3	4.6; 0	5.0; 0/1	6.4; 2	–	3.6
TSA/Canarias7	3–19 Apr 2023	?	?	33.2; 11/12	27.5; 9/10	8.6; 2/3	2.2; 0	12.1; 3/4	4.5; 0	–	6.5; 2	–	5.7
GAD3/Tiempo de Canarias	30 Mar–18 Apr 2023	611	?	32.7; 11	30.5; 10/12	5.9; 1/2	0.8; 0	6.5; 2	6.1; 2	6.0; 1/2	5.0; 0/1	1.4; 0	2.2
EM-Analytics/GMG	6 Jan–4 Apr 2023	1,283	?	32.7; 11	27.9; 10	8.1; 2	1.1; 0	11.9; 4	4.8; 0	5.1; 1	5.3; 1	2.4; 0	4.8
22Grados/Tiempo de Canarias	15–31 Mar 2023	?	?	37.2; 12/15	28.4; 10/12	4.8; 0/2	0.4; 0	7.4; 2/3	6.1; 0/2	4.5; 0	5.0; 0/2	–	8.8
Sigma Dos/El Mundo	13–19 Jan 2023	300	?	33.8; 11/12	27.5; 9/10	5.7; 1/2	1.2; 0	9.1; 3	10.6; 3	4.8; 0/1	2.0; 0	–	6.3
EM-Analytics/GMG	18 Sep–5 Jan 2023	876	?	32.5; 11	27.2; 9	8.6; 3	0.9; 0	13.4; 4	4.6; 0	5.7; 1	5.1; 1	–	5.3
Ágora Integral/Canarias Ahora	25 Nov–10 Dec 2022	1,000	?	32.3; 11/12	27.9; 10	7.9; 2	–	10.6; 4	4.8; 0	5.1; 0/1	5.2; 1	–	4.4
EM-Analytics/GMG	10 May–18 Sep 2022	751	?	34.5; 11	27.5; 8	9.5; 3	0.9; 0	13.8; 4	6.5; 2	5.1; 1	–	–	7.0
TSA/Canarias7	21 Feb–23 Mar 2022	?	?	33.5; 11/12	19.8; 6/7	8.4; 2/3	? 0	13.7; 4/5	? 0	5.3; 1/2	5.2; 1/2	–	13.7
EM-Analytics/Electomanía	13 May–1 Oct 2021	358	?	31.9; 11	26.1; 9	8.1; 2	3.6; 0	10.9; 3	8.2; 2	6.0; 2		–	5.8
2019 municipal election	26 May 2019	—N/a	50.7	31.7; 11	22.2; 7	10.4; 3	9.5; 3	9.5; 3	8.4; 2	3.2; 0		–	9.5

=== Los Realejos ===
Polling firm/Commissioner	Fieldwork date	Sample size	Turnout	PP	PSOE	CCa	Podemos	IUC	CS	Vox	USP	Lead
2023 municipal election	28 May 2023	—N/a	69.9	61.3; 15	22.5; 5	6.0; 1	(Note: Within USP.)		0.6; 0	2.4; 0	4.0; 0	38.8
SyM Consulting	17–20 Sep 2021	582	69.4	44.4; 11/12	32.2; 8	7.9; 1/2	3.5; 0	2.5; 0	0.5; 0	5.0; 0	–	12.2
2019 municipal election	26 May 2019	—N/a	71.7	64.0; 15	20.3; 5	5.7; 1	4.6; 0	2.3; 0	1.8; 0	–	–	43.7

=== Pájara ===
Polling firm/Commissioner	Fieldwork date	Sample size	Turnout	PSOE	CCa	NCa	PP	Podemos	AMF	Vox	Lead
2023 municipal election	28 May 2023	—N/a	51.3	35.2; 8	27.1; 6	14.1; 3	8.0; 2	–	11.1; 2	2.0; 0	8.1
Perfiles/Radio Insular	24 Oct–3 Nov 2022	600	?	33.0– 34.0; 9	25.0– 26.0; 7	13.0– 14.0; 3	8.0– 9.0; 2	3.0– 4.0; 0		3.0– 4.0; 0	8.0
2019 municipal election	26 May 2019	—N/a	52.6	34.8; 8	27.9; 7	13.7; 3	8.8; 2	6.0; 1		–	6.9

=== Puerto de la Cruz ===
Polling firm/Commissioner	Fieldwork date	Sample size	Turnout	PSOE	PP	ACP	CCa	CS	Lead
2023 municipal election	28 May 2023	—N/a	60.5	45.7; 10	29.1; 7	11.5; 2	8.4; 2	–	16.6
SyM Consulting	21–23 Sep 2021	517	64.0	33.6; 7/8	35.3; 8	12.0; 2/3	15.1; 3	0.5; 0	1.7
2019 municipal election	26 May 2019	—N/a	61.1	37.4; 8	33.4; 8	13.4; 3	9.1; 2	3.7; 2	4.0

=== Puerto del Rosario ===
Polling firm/Commissioner	Fieldwork date	Sample size	Turnout	PSOE	CCa	PP	NCa	AEPR	CS	Podemos	GF	AMF	FA	USP	Lead
2023 municipal election	28 May 2023	—N/a	54.1	14.2; 4	25.1; 7	16.6; 4	3.6; 0	–	–		–	7.1; 1	17.1; 4	2.2; 0	8.0
Perfiles/Radio Insular	24 Oct–3 Nov 2022	600	?	17.0– 18.0; 4/5	26.0– 27.0; 6/7	20.0– 21.0; 5/6	4.0– 5.0; 0/1	4.0– 5.0; 0/1	(Note: Within FA.)	4.0– 5.0; 0/1	3.0– 4.0; 0		13.0– 14.0; 3/4	–	6.0
2019 municipal election	26 May 2019	—N/a	52.7	19.9; 5	17.4; 4	13.5; 3	9.8; 2	7.9; 2	7.9; 2	7.6; 2	5.0; 1		–	–	2.5

=== San Bartolomé de Tirajana ===
Polling firm/Commissioner	Fieldwork date	Sample size	Turnout	PP	PSOE	NCa	CCa	CS	UxGC	Podemos	Vox	USP	Lead
2023 municipal election	28 May 2023	—N/a	57.7	26.4; 7	19.9; 6	16.7; 5	23.8; 7	–	1.2; 0		4.2; 0	1.5; 0	2.6
Ágora Integral/Canarias Ahora	5–23 Apr 2023	500	?	39.0; 11/12	23.3; 6/7	12.3; 3	12.0; 3	–	5.9; 1		2.2; 0	3.0; 0	15.7
GCEMOP	29 Mar–5 Apr 2023	300	?	26.0– 27.0; 8	17.0– 18.0; 5	13.0– 14.0; 4	25.0– 26.0; 8	2.0– 3.0; 0	2.0– 3.0; 0	3.0– 4.0; 0	3.0– 4.0; 0	–	1.0
2019 municipal election	26 May 2019	—N/a	56.2	26.8; 8	24.5; 7	16.4; 5	12.4; 4	5.7; 1	4.7; 0	3.9; 0	2.0; 0	–	2.3

=== San Cristóbal de La Laguna ===
Polling firm/Commissioner	Fieldwork date	Sample size	Turnout	CCa	PSOE	USP	Avante	PP	CS	Vox	NCa	DVC	Lead
2023 municipal election	28 May 2023	—N/a	56.6	27.4; 8	32.6; 10	7.3; 2	(Note: Within PSOE.)	12.3; 3	0.7; 0	7.5; 2	2.1; 0	6.2; 2	5.0
TSA/Canarias7	1–18 May 2023	?	?	25.2; 8	34.5; 11	11.4; 3		9.8; 3	–	–	–	7.2; 2	9.3
Perfiles/La Provincia	12–17 May 2023	?	?	23.0– 24.0; 8	35.0– 36.0; 11/12	11.0– 12.0; 3/4		7.0– 8.0; 2	2.0– 3.0; 0	4.0– 5.0; 0/1	–	5.0– 6.0; 1/2	12.0
Ágora Integral/Canarias Ahora	5–23 Apr 2023	500	?	27.1; 8/9	33.4; 10/11	12.0; 3/4		15.6; 4/5	–	3.3; 0	–	5.0; 0/1	6.3
TSA/Canarias7	3–19 Apr 2023	?	?	26.3; 8/9	33.2; 10/11	11.6; 3/4		11.5; 3/4	2.1; 0	2.2; 0	4.3; 0	6.1; 1/2	6.9
EM-Analytics/GMG	15 Jun–4 Feb 2023	975	?	29.1; 8	32.8; 9	13.7; 4		13.2; 4	1.8; 0	4.2; 2	2.8; 0	–	3.7
Ágora Integral/Canarias Ahora	19–22 Jan 2023	500	?	27.9; 8	34.4; 11	13.9; 4		15.9; 4	1.1; 0	2.2; 0	2.8; 0	–	6.5
EM-Analytics/GMG	2 May–15 Jun 2022	654	?	28.8; 9	24.3; 7	16.1; 5	6.9; 2	9.1; 2	4.6; 0	7.3; 2	2.3; 0	–	4.5
TSA/Canarias7	21 Feb–23 Mar 2022	?	?	? 8/9	? 11/12	? 4/5	? 0	? 2	? 0	4.8; 0	–	–	?
SyM Consulting	21–23 Sep 2021	639	53.9	29.8; 9	20.7; 6/7	13.7; 4	6.6; 2	12.9; 3/4	3.0; 0	7.6; 2	–	–	9.2
2019 municipal election	26 May 2019	—N/a	55.6	27.7; 9	23.9; 7	17.0; 5	8.8; 2	7.8; 2	7.1; 2	2.3; 0	2.3; 0	–	3.8

=== Santa Cruz de Tenerife ===
Color key:

Poll conducted after legal ban on opinion polls

Polling firm/Commissioner	Fieldwork date	Sample size	Turnout	CCa	PSOE	USP	PP	CS	Vox	NCa	DVC	Lead
2023 municipal election	28 May 2023	—N/a	54.3	28.9; 9	30.2; 10	4.5; 0	16.1; 5	1.2; 0	8.8; 3	1.6; 0	3.6; 0	1.3
Sigma Dos/RTVE–FORTA	28 May 2023	?	?	30.2; 9/10	30.8; 10	5.9; 1	15.2; 4/5	–	8.3; 2	–	–	0.6
TSA/Canarias7	1–18 May 2023	?	?	29.7; 10	29.5; 10	8.3; 2	10.2; 3	5.2; 1	–	–	5.0; 1	0.2
Perfiles/La Provincia	12–17 May 2023	?	?	30.0– 31.0; 9/10	29.0– 30.0; 9/10	6.0– 7.0; 1/2	15.0– 16.0; 4/5	3.0– 4.0; 0	7.0– 8.0; 2	–	4.0– 5.0; 0/1	1.0
Ágora Integral/Canarias Ahora	1–14 May 2023	?	?	31.3; 9/10	31.2; 9/10	6.8; 2	15.7; 5	–	4.5; 0	1.7; 0	5.0; 0/1	0.1
EM-Analytics/GMG	1 Apr–12 May 2023	401	?	31.0; 10	26.8; 8	10.9; 3	12.9; 4	2.9; 0	6.5; 2	1.8; 0	4.6; 0	4.2
Ágora Integral/Canarias Ahora	5–23 Apr 2023	1,000	?	32.8; 10/11	30.0; 9/10	6.9; 2	15.7; 4/5	–	4.3; 0	–	5.0; 0/1	2.8
TSA/Canarias7	3–19 Apr 2023	?	?	31.9; 10/11	29.8; 9/10	6.9; 2	13.6; 4	–	–	–	5.1; 1	2.1
GAD3/Tiempo de Canarias	30 Mar–18 Apr 2023	587	?	33.8; 10/11	29.7; 9	6.7; 2	15.9; 5	1.1; 0	4.7; 0/1	0.3; 0	2.0; 0	4.1
22Grados/Tiempo de Canarias	15–31 Mar 2023	?	?	29.7; 10/11	27.1; 9/10	11.1; 2/4	13.7; 4/6	3.4; 0	5.2; 0/2	1.6; 0	–	2.6
Sigma Dos/El Mundo	13–19 Jan 2023	300	?	30.0; 9/10	29.5; 9/10	9.3; 3	15.2; 4/5	2.2; 0	5.3; 1	1.5; 0	–	0.5
Ágora Integral/Canarias Ahora	26 Dec–2 Jan 2022	500	?	32.4; 10/11	28.7; 9/10	7.3; 2	16.3; 5	1.4; 0	4.7; 2	–	–	3.7
EM-Analytics/GMG	23 Oct–22 Nov 2022	345	?	30.6; 9	28.0; 9	12.1; 3	12.7; 4	2.9; 0	6.7; 2	1.7; 0	–	2.6
EM-Analytics/GMG	20 May–22 Oct 2022	980	?	30.9; 10	27.3; 8	11.8; 3	12.7; 4	3.9; 0	6.4; 2	1.7; 0	–	3.6
EM-Analytics/GMG	2–19 May 2022	695	?	30.0; 10	26.8; 8	11.8; 3	12.3; 4	4.4; 0	7.4; 2	1.7; 0	–	3.2
TSA/Canarias7	21 Feb–23 Mar 2022	?	?	? 10/11	? 9/10	? 2/3	? 3/4	? 0	5.2; 1	–	–	?
SyM Consulting	21–23 Sep 2021	768	55.0	27.8; 8/9	25.6; 7/8	7.1; 2	23.6; 7	2.4; 0	7.9; 2	–	–	2.2
ElectoPanel/Electomanía	1 Apr–15 Jun 2020	?	?	32.4; 10	21.5; 7	9.3; 3	12.2; 4	–	9.6; 3	–	–	10.9
2019 municipal election	26 May 2019	—N/a	53.4	30.8; 10	26.4; 9	10.6; 3	9.7; 3	8.4; 2	3.1; 0	1.7; 0	–	4.4

=== Santiago del Teide ===
Polling firm/Commissioner	Fieldwork date	Sample size	Turnout	PP	CCa	PSOE	Lead
2023 municipal election	28 May 2023	—N/a	54.9	68.4; 13	20.7; 3	7.2; 1	47.7
SyM Consulting	17 Sep–1 Oct 2021	591	60.8	56.8; 10	28.0; 4/5	14.2; 2/3	28.8
2019 municipal election	26 May 2019	—N/a	55.4	63.5; 11	24.1; 4	11.6; 2	39.4

=== Telde ===
Polling firm/Commissioner	Fieldwork date	Sample size	Turnout	NCa	PSOE	CCa	CIUCA	PP	+xT	USP	CS	GCC	Vox	UxGC	DVC	Lead
2023 municipal election	28 May 2023	—N/a	54.6	14.2; 4	15.1; 5	9.6; 3	22.2; 7	13.5; 4	5.9; 2	2.1; 0	–	–	6.3; 2	2.5; 0	1.6; 0	7.1
TSA/Canarias7	1–18 May 2023	?	?	29.2; 9/10	20.0; 6/7	7.1; 2	6.8; 2	11.8; 3/4	5.8; 1/2	5.7; 1/2	–	–	–	4.5; 0	–	9.2
Perfiles/La Provincia	12–17 May 2023	?	?	23.0– 24.0; 8	18.0– 19.0; 6	11.0– 12.0; 3/4	11.0– 12.0; 3/4	9.0– 10.0; 3	6.0– 7.0; 2	3.0– 4.0; 0	–	–	4.0– 5.0; 0/1	3.0– 4.0; 0	–	5.0
Ágora Integral/Canarias Ahora	5–23 Apr 2023	500	?	26.7; 8	19.1; 6	11.5; 3	9.7; 2	15.9; 4/5	6.4; 2	5.0; 0/1	–	–	1.9; 0	1.2; 0	1.9; 0	7.6
TSA/Canarias7	3–19 Apr 2023	?	?	28.9; 9/10	19.8; 6/7	9.8; 3	7.5; 2	12.2; 3/4	6.2; 1/2	5.8; 1/2	1.8; 0	–	2.5; 0	3.9; 0	–	9.1
EM-Analytics/GMG	10 May–18 Sep 2022	450	?	21.8; 7	22.5; 7	11.1; 3	9.9; 3	9.2; 2	7.6; 2	6.4; 2	1.1; 0	3.0; 0	5.2; 1	–	–	0.7
TSA/Canarias7	21 Feb–23 Mar 2022	?	?	30.2; 10/11	18.6; 6/7	5.0; 1/2	8.9; 2/3	? 2	9.6; 3/4	? 1/2	–	–	5.1; 1/2	–	–	11.6
2019 municipal election	26 May 2019	—N/a	54.2	24.3; 8	20.2; 6	12.2; 4	10.4; 3	7.2; 2	7.1; 2	6.8; 2	4.1; 0	3.3; 0	2.0; 0		–	4.1

=== Tuineje ===
Polling firm/Commissioner	Fieldwork date	Sample size	Turnout	CCa	PP	AMF	PSOE	NCa	Lead
2023 municipal election	28 May 2023	—N/a	58.0	31.2; 6	34.0; 6	9.8; 1	14.6; 3	6.1; 1	2.8
Perfiles/Radio Insular	24 Oct–3 Nov 2022	600	?	27.0– 28.0; 5/6	29.0– 30.0; 5/6	11.0– 12.0; 2	20.0– 21.0; 4	3.0– 4.0; 0	2.0
2019 municipal election	26 May 2019	—N/a	61.6	25.1; 5	21.6; 4	19.9; 4	19.7; 4	4.9; 0	3.5

== Island Cabildos ==
=== El Hierro ===
Color key:

Poll conducted after legal ban on opinion polls

Polling firm/Commissioner	Fieldwork date	Sample size	Turnout	PSOE	AH	AHI	PP	IUC	NCa	Lead
2023 island council election	28 May 2023	—N/a	70.3	26.0; 3	20.9; 3	26.4; 4	14.5; 2	8.0; 1	–	0.4
Sigma Dos/RTVE–FORTA	28 May 2023	?	?	25.4; 4/5	13.1; 2	31.5; 4/5	16.2; 2	6.2; 0/1	–	6.1
Perfiles/La Provincia	12–17 May 2023	?	?	15.0– 16.0; 2	25.0– 26.0; 4	33.0– 34.0; 5	13.0– 14.0; 2	–	–	8.0
Ágora Integral/Canarias Ahora	5–23 Apr 2023	200	?	27.1; 3/4	24.3; 3/4	24.2; 3/4	14.3; 1/2	6.8; 1	–	2.8
TSA/Canarias7	3–19 Apr 2023	?	?	28.7; 4	22.4; 3	25.2; 3/4	? 1	? 1	–	3.5
22Grados/Tiempo de Canarias	15–31 Mar 2023	?	?	35.6; 4/6	21.6; 2/4	24.7; 2/4	12.3; 0/2	4.7; 0	–	10.9
2019 island council election	26 May 2019	—N/a	75.3	26.9; 4	24.0; 4	20.9; 3	10.2; 1	7.5; 1	2.8; 0	2.9

=== Fuerteventura ===
Color key:

Poll conducted after legal ban on opinion polls

Polling firm/Commissioner	Fieldwork date	Sample size	Turnout	CCa	PSOE	PP	NCa	Podemos	CS	GF	Vox	AMF	USP	DVC	Lead
2023 island council election	28 May 2023	—N/a	56.0	27.8; 8	17.6; 5	18.7; 5	12.7; 3		–	–	5.0; 0	9.4; 2	2.0; 0	3.1; 0	9.1
Sigma Dos/RTVE–FORTA	28 May 2023	?	?	27.2; 7/8	22.1; 6	20.7; 5/6	6.2; 1		–	–	6.8; 1/2	–	5.6; 1	–	5.1
Ágora Integral/Canarias Ahora	14–17 May 2023	800	?	23.2; 6	24.9; 7	21.1; 5	7.8; 2		–	–	–	11.8; 2/3	4.9; 0/1	–	1.7
Perfiles/La Provincia	12–17 May 2023	?	?	28.0– 29.0; 8/9	19.0– 20.0; 5/6	16.0– 17.0; 4/5	8.0– 9.0; 2		–	–	–	5.0– 6.0; 1	5.0– 6.0; 1	–	9.0
Ágora Integral/Canarias Ahora	5–23 Apr 2023	350	?	24.2; 6/7	23.6; 6/7	22.9; 5/6	9.0; 2		–	–	2.9; 0	7.5; 1	6.0; 1	1.2; 0	0.6
TSA/Canarias7	3–19 Apr 2023	?	?	27.5; 7/8	24.5; 6/7	17.6; 4/5	9.9; 2/3		–	–	–	–	6.3; 1	–	3.0
22Grados/Tiempo de Canarias	15–31 Mar 2023	?	?	29.3; 7/9	24.2; 7/8	18.3; 5/6	4.3; 0		1.4; 0	2.3; 0	–	7.1; 0/2	4.8; 0/1	–	5.1
Perfiles/Radio Insular	24 Oct–3 Nov 2022	600	?	26.0– 27.0; 9	21.0– 22.0; 7	17.0– 18.0; 5/6	3.0– 4.0; 0	3.0– 4.0; 0	–	–	–	5.0– 6.0; 1/2	–	–	5.0
TSA/Canarias7	21 Feb–23 Mar 2022	?	?	21.2; 5/6	31.1; 8/9	13.8; 3/4	? 3/4	5.1; 1	2.0; 0	3.8; 0	3.4; 0		–	–	9.9
2019 island council election	26 May 2019	—N/a	56.7	25.4; 7	23.1; 7	14.2; 4	10.8; 3	7.0; 2	4.8; 0	4.7; 0	2.8; 0		–	–	2.3

=== Gran Canaria ===
Color key:

Poll conducted after legal ban on opinion polls

Polling firm/Commissioner	Fieldwork date	Sample size	Turnout	NCa	PSOE	PP	CCa	Podemos	CS	Vox	IUC	UxGC	USP	DVC	Lead
2023 island council election	28 May 2023	—N/a	55.8	24.4; 8	21.8; 8	20.4; 7	9.0; 3		0.3; 0	8.9; 3		4.8; 0	3.4; 0	1.8; 0	2.6
Sigma Dos/RTVE–FORTA	28 May 2023	?	?	26.8; 9/10	25.1; 8/9	20.7; 7	9.9; 3		–	4.9; 0/1		–	4.6; 0/1	–	1.7
TSA/Canarias7	1–18 May 2023	?	55	28.1; 9/10	26.0; 8/9	21.2; 7	5.2; 1		1.3; 0	2.9; 0		5.0; 1	7.1; 2	–	2.1
Perfiles/La Provincia	12–17 May 2023	?	?	24.0– 25.0; 7/8	22.0– 23.0; 7/8	17.0– 18.0; 5/6	10.0– 11.0; 3/4		3.0– 4.0; 0	6.0– 7.0; 2		5.0– 6.0; 1/2	5.0– 6.0; 1/2	–	2.0
Ágora Integral/Canarias Ahora	1–14 May 2023	800	?	26.2; 9	24.3; 8	23.1; 7/8	5.1; 1		0.4; 0	4.6; 0		8.1; 2/3	5.9; 1	1.3; 0	1.9
Ágora Integral/Canarias Ahora	5–23 Apr 2023	750	?	26.5; 9	25.2; 8/9	23.5; 7	5.8; 1		0.4; 0	2.8; 0		7.2; 2	5.8; 0/1	2.6; 0	1.3
TSA/Canarias7	3–19 Apr 2023	?	56	27.4; 9/10	25.8; 8/9	20.1; 6/7	5.0; 1		2.5; 0	2.3; 0		5.4; 1/2	6.7; 2	–	1.6
GAD3/Tiempo de Canarias	30 Mar–18 Apr 2023	827	?	18.5; 7	26.6; 8	21.7; 7	9.3; 3		0.7; 0	5.8; 1		6.1; 2	5.9; 1	1.2; 0	4.9
22Grados/Tiempo de Canarias	15–31 Mar 2023	?	?	25.6; 8/9	25.9; 8/9	21.2; 7/8	7.0; 2/3		0.5; 0	3.9; 0		5.1; 0/2	3.7; 0	–	0.3
Ágora Integral/Canarias Ahora	25 Nov–10 Dec 2022	1,000	56.3	26.7; 9	26.5; 9	23.1; 7/8	5.0; 1	5.8; 1/2	–	–	–	5.4; 1	–	–	0.2
TSA/Canarias7	21 Feb–23 Mar 2022	?	56.0	29.2; 9/10	29.8; 9/10	17.6; 5/6	? 1	5.2; 1	2.5; 0	5.2; 1	–	? 1/2	–	–	0.6
Hamalgama Métrica/La Provincia	3–16 Sep 2019	800	?	23.9; 8	28.9; 9	18.6; 6	8.6; 2	7.2; 2	6.5; 2	2.5; 0	0.7; 0		–	–	5.0
2019 island council election	26 May 2019	—N/a	56.2	25.7; 8	24.5; 8	17.8; 6	10.7; 3	7.2; 2	6.9; 2	2.5; 0	0.6; 0		–	–	1.2

=== La Gomera ===
Color key:

Poll conducted after legal ban on opinion polls

Polling firm/Commissioner	Fieldwork date	Sample size	Turnout	ASG	PSOE	IxLG	CCa	PP	NCa	Lead
2023 island council election	28 May 2023	—N/a	73.2	58.5; 11	15.2; 3	14.2; 2	6.0; 1	3.5; 0	–	43.3
Sigma Dos/RTVE–FORTA	28 May 2023	?	?	53.8; 10	16.7; 3	14.0; 2	7.1; 1	5.5; 1	–	37.1
Perfiles/La Provincia	12–17 May 2023	?	?	51.0– 52.0; 10/11	14.0– 15.0; 2/3	6.0– 7.0; 1	6.0– 7.0; 1	8.0– 9.0; 1	–	37.0
Ágora Integral/Canarias Ahora	5–23 Apr 2023	250	?	59.7; 11	14.7; 3	10.3; 1	5.3; 1	5.2; 1	–	45.0
TSA/Canarias7	3–19 Apr 2023	?	?	59.2; 12	17.2; 3	? 1	? 1	–	–	42.0
22Grados/Tiempo de Canarias	15–31 Mar 2023	?	?	62.1; 11/12	20.3; 2/4	7.9; 1/2	3.5; 0	3.1; 0	–	41.8
Ágora Integral/Canarias Ahora	8–10 Feb 2023	400	76.3	58.5; 11	15.2; 3	10.2; 1	5.9; 1	6.6; 1	3.8; 0	43.3
2019 island council election	26 May 2019	—N/a	76.1	57.5; 11	14.8; 3	12.8; 2	5.6; 1	4.5; 0	4.2; 0	42.7

=== La Palma ===
Color key:

Poll conducted after legal ban on opinion polls

Polling firm/Commissioner	Fieldwork date	Sample size	Turnout	CCa	PSOE	PP	Podemos	NCa	CS	USP	DVC	Lead
2023 island council election	28 May 2023	—N/a	69.1	46.8; 11	20.6; 5	20.2; 5		2.7; 0	0.9; 0	1.8; 0	2.1; 0	26.2
Sigma Dos/RTVE–FORTA	28 May 2023	?	?	38.8; 9/10	23.7; 5/6	24.3; 6		–	–	–	–	14.5
Perfiles/La Provincia	12–17 May 2023	?	?	31.0– 32.0; 9	27.0– 28.0; 7	20.0– 21.0; 5		–	–	–	–	4.0
Ágora Integral/Canarias Ahora	5–23 Apr 2023	350	?	30.8; 8	28.1; 6	30.2; 7		3.9; 0	0.2; 0	3.9; 0	1.1; 0	0.6
TSA/Canarias7	3–19 Apr 2023	?	?	27.3; 6/7	29.2; 6/7	31.4; 7/8		–	–	–	–	5.2
22Grados/Tiempo de Canarias	15–31 Mar 2023	?	?	33.0; 7/9	27.0; 6/7	27.8; 6/7		–	–	4.2; 0	–	5.2
Ágora Integral/Canarias Ahora	8–15 Jan 2023	500	68.0	30.8; 8	28.1; 6	30.0; 7	3.2; 0	3.2; 0	0.4; 0	–	–	0.8
2019 island council election	26 May 2019	—N/a	68.1	29.9; 8	29.2; 7	25.5; 6	3.6; 0	3.5; 0	2.4; 0	–	–	0.7

=== Lanzarote ===
Color key:

Poll conducted after legal ban on opinion polls

Polling firm/Commissioner	Fieldwork date	Sample size	Turnout	PSOE	CCa	PP	Podemos	CS	NCa	LAVA	Vox	USP	DVC	Lead
2023 island council election	28 May 2023	—N/a	50.2	28.8; 8	28.9; 8	17.2; 4		–	8.8; 2	–	6.1; 1	4.2; 0	–	0.1
Sigma Dos/RTVE–FORTA	28 May 2023	?	?	30.7; 8	31.2; 8	18.9; 5		–	5.0; 1	–	5.6; 1	–	–	0.5
Perfiles/La Provincia	12–17 May 2023	?	?	25.0– 26.0; 7	31.0– 32.0; 9	17.0– 18.0; 4/5		–	7.0– 8.0; 1/2	–	4.0– 5.0; 0/1	3.0– 4.0; 0	–	6.0
Ágora Integral/Canarias Ahora	1–14 May 2023	800	?	29.3; 9	27.8; 7/8	21.5; 5/6		0.9; 0	6.8; 1	–	4.8; 0	5.7; 1	1.4; 0	1.5
Ágora Integral/Canarias Ahora	5–23 Apr 2023	350	52.0	29.3; 9	27.8; 7	21.5; 5		0.9; 0	5.1; 1	4.8; 0	2.4; 0	5.7; 1	1.2; 0	1.5
TSA/Canarias7	3–19 Apr 2023	?	?	30.1; 8/9	26.1; 7/8	17.0; 4		–	8.6; 2	–	2.2; 0	5.8; 1	–	4.0
22Grados/Tiempo de Canarias	15–31 Mar 2023	?	?	36.0; 8/10	27.0; 7/9	15.4; 4/5		0.2; 0	5.3; 0/1	–	2.2; 0	6.0; 0/2	–	9.0
TSA/Canarias7	21 Feb–23 Mar 2022	?	?	34.2; 10	20.4; 6	11.5; 4	5.8; 1	3.2; 0	7.8; 2	3.6; 0	4.7; 0	–	–	13.8
2019 island council election	26 May 2019	—N/a	51.9	28.3; 9	27.7; 8	13.8; 4	7.6; 2	4.9; 0	4.7; 0	4.6; 0	2.4; 0	–	–	0.6

=== Tenerife ===
Color key:

Poll conducted after legal ban on opinion polls

Polling firm/Commissioner	Fieldwork date	Sample size	Turnout	CCa	PSOE	PP	Podemos	CS	Vox	NCa	USP	DVC	Lead
2023 island council election	28 May 2023	—N/a	58.2	27.4; 10	28.7; 11	20.1; 8		0.8; 0	7.1; 2	2.6; 0	4.5; 0	4.3; 0	1.3
Sigma Dos/RTVE–FORTA	28 May 2023	?	?	29.0; 10	31.2; 11	19.6; 6/7		–	8.1; 2/3	–	4.9; 0/1	–	2.2
Perfiles/La Provincia	12–17 May 2023	?	?	29.0– 30.0; 11	25.0– 26.0; 9/10	15.0– 16.0; 5/6		3.0– 4.0; 0	7.0– 8.0; 2/3	–	7.0– 8.0; 2/3	4.0– 5.0; 0/2	4.0
Ágora Integral/Canarias Ahora	1–14 May 2023	800	?	32.6; 11/12	32.2; 11/12	18.4; 6		0.3; 0	4.4; 0	1.7; 0	6.1; 2	2.3; 0	0.4
Ágora Integral/Canarias Ahora	5–23 Apr 2023	750	?	32.1; 11/12	29.8; 11	19.9; 6/7		0.2; 0	2.4; 0	2.2; 0	7.8; 2	2.1; 0	2.3
TSA/Canarias7	3–19 Apr 2023	?	?	31.8; 11/12	31.4; 11/12	15.5; 5/6		–	–	–	7.0; 2	–	0.4
GAD3/Tiempo de Canarias	30 Mar–18 Apr 2023	827	?	24.9; 9	31.7; 12	21.9; 8		1.7; 0	5.4; 2	4.2; 0	4.3; 0	3.3; 0	6.8
22Grados/Tiempo de Canarias	15–31 Mar 2023	?	?	28.0; 9/11	29.4; 9/11	20.8; 7/8		3.0; 0	5.5; 0	–	8.6; 3/4	–	1.4
Ágora Integral/Canarias Ahora	26 Dic–2 Jan 2023	1,000	?	32.9; 11/12	29.9; 10/11	19.1; 7	6.9; 2	1.6; 0	4.3; 0	0.9; 0	–	–	3.0
TSA/Canarias7	21 Feb–23 Mar 2022	?	?	27.1; 9/10	34.7; 12/13	13.9; 4/5	6.7; 2	2.3; 0	5.2; 1/2	5.1; 1/2	–	–	7.6
2019 island council election	26 May 2019	—N/a	58.4	31.1; 11	30.8; 11	12.6; 4	9.4; 3	6.3; 2	2.2; 0	1.9; 0	–	–	0.3
