= Opinion polling for the 2015 Spanish local elections (Canary Islands) =

In the run up to the 2015 Spanish local elections, various organisations carried out opinion polling to gauge voting intention in local entities in Spain. Results of such polls for municipalities and island cabildos in the Canary Islands are displayed in this article. The date range for these opinion polls is from the previous local elections, held on 22 May 2011, to the day the next elections were held, on 24 May 2015.

Polls are listed in reverse chronological order, showing the most recent first and using the dates when the survey fieldwork was done, as opposed to the date of publication. Where the fieldwork dates are unknown, the date of publication is given instead. The highest percentage figure in each polling survey is displayed with its background shaded in the leading party's colour. If a tie ensues, this is applied to the figures with the highest percentages. The "Lead" columns on the right shows the percentage-point difference between the parties with the highest percentages in a given poll.

== Municipalities ==
=== Las Palmas de Gran Canaria ===
Polling firm/Commissioner	Fieldwork date	Sample size	Turnout	PP	PSOE	UxGC	NCa	CCa	LV	IUC	UPyD	LPGCP	C's	Lead
2015 municipal election	24 May 2015	—N/a	57.0	28.8; 10	19.7; 7	5.6; 2	7.5; 2	3.2; 0	(Note: Within IUC.)	3.5; 0	1.4; 0	16.1; 6	7.7; 2	9.1
Perfiles/Diario de Avisos	4–14 May 2015	?	?	31.0– 32.0; 11/12	18.0– 19.0; 6/7	5.0– 6.0; 1/2	6.0– 7.0; 2	5.0– 6.0; 1/2	–	–	–	7.0– 8.0; 2/3	11.0– 12.0; 4/5	13.0
Focus Investigación	21 Apr 2015	?	?	33.3; 11	20.7; 6/7	–	4.0; 0	5.1; 0/1	–	5.8; 1/2	–	17.2; 5/6	7.6; 2	12.6
Perfiles/Diario de Avisos	7–20 Apr 2015	?	?	31.0– 32.0; 11/12	19.0– 20.0; 7	–	7.0– 8.0; 2/3	4.0– 5.0; 0/1	–	–	–	8.0– 9.0; 3	13.0– 14.0; 5	12.0
TSA/Canarias7	26 Mar–9 Apr 2015	?	?	30.1; 10/11	19.5; 6/7	1.9; 0	9.1; 3	–	–	–	–	16.7; 5/6	8.5; 2/3	10.6
NC Report/Canarias7	9 Feb 2014	?	?	33.5; 11/13	21.1; 7/8	5.8; 1/2	10.5; 3/4	6.1; 1/2	5.1; 1/2	5.5; 1/2	–	–	–	12.4
Hamalgama Métrica/La Provincia	25 Nov–5 Dec 2013	?	50.2	34.9; 13	21.6; 8	8.9; 3	9.9; 4	5.0; 1	4.8; 0	4.6; 0	4.7; 0	–	–	13.3
2011 municipal election	22 May 2011	—N/a	56.1	43.2; 16	23.0; 9	7.0 (Note: Results for CGCa.); 2	6.1; 2	4.9; 0	3.4; 0	1.9; 0	1.7; 0	–	–	20.2

=== Mogán ===
Polling firm/Commissioner	Fieldwork date	Sample size	Turnout	PP	CIUCA	PSOE	NCa	CCa	CGCa	Podemos	Lead
2015 municipal election	24 May 2015	—N/a	67.6	35.3; 8	41.6; 10	8.1; 2	5.1; 1	2.5; 0	4.3; 0	–	6.3
Investigación & Desarrollo/PP	5 Feb 2015	450	?	50.7; 12	20.0; 5	7.6; 1	6.5; 1	2.8; 0	4.2; 0	8.0; 2	30.7
2011 municipal election	22 May 2011	—N/a	66.5	50.7; 11	25.5; 6	10.2; 2	7.2; 1	5.2; 1	–	–	25.2

=== San Cristóbal de La Laguna ===
Polling firm/Commissioner	Fieldwork date	Sample size	Turnout	CCa	PP	PSOE	IUC	SSP	Podemos	NCa	C's	USP	Lead
2015 municipal election	24 May 2015	—N/a	58.1	23.9; 7	15.2; 4	18.1; 5	(Note: Within Unid@s Se Puede.)			9.6; 3	7.2; 2	18.5; 6	5.4
Perfiles/Diario de Avisos	4–14 May 2015	?	?	25.0– 26.0; 8	13.0– 14.0; 4	18.0– 19.0; 5/6				13.0– 14.0; 4	8.0– 9.0; 2/3	12.0– 13.0; 3/4	7.0
Perfiles/Diario de Avisos	7–20 Apr 2015	?	?	26.0– 27.0; 8/9	19.0– 20.0; 6	17.0– 18.0; 5/6				10.0– 11.0; 3	5.0– 6.0; 1/2	12.0– 13.0; 3/4	7.0
TSA/Canarias7	26 Mar–9 Apr 2015	?	?	27.2; 8/9	13.7; 4	13.6; 4	4.6; 0	–	12.0; 3/4	16.3; 5	9.0; 2/3	–	10.9
ULL/PSOE	2 Mar 2015	995	?	? 8/9	? 4	? 8/9	–	–	? 6	–	–	–	Tie
2011 municipal election	22 May 2011	—N/a	59.0	39.8; 13	20.6; 6	15.1; 4	9.1; 3	5.8; 1	–	–	–	–	19.2

=== Santa Cruz de Tenerife ===
Polling firm/Commissioner	Fieldwork date	Sample size	Turnout	PP	CCa	PSOE	SSP	IUC	CSC	CCN	NCa	C's	Lead
2015 municipal election	24 May 2015	—N/a	55.1	17.5; 6	24.3; 9	13.2; 4	12.1; 4	5.1; 1	–	1.8; 0	1.8; 0	9.5; 3	6.8
Perfiles/Diario de Avisos	4–14 May 2015	?	?	18.0– 19.0; 6/7	30.0– 31.0; 10/11	15.0– 16.0; 5/6	8.0– 9.0; 2/3	4.0– 5.0; 0/1	–	–	4.0– 5.0; 0/1	8.0– 9.0; 2/3	12.0
Perfiles/Diario de Avisos	7–20 Apr 2015	?	?	19.0– 20.0; 7	27.0– 28.0; 9/10	14.0– 15.0; 5	8.0– 9.0; 2/3	5.0– 6.0; 1/2	–	–	–	8.0– 9.0; 2/3	8.0
TSA/Canarias7	26 Mar–9 Apr 2015	?	?	17.4; 5/6	22.8; 7/8	12.3; 3/4	12.5; 3/4	4.1; 0	–	3.5; 0	8.9; 1/2	15.2; 4/5	5.4
MírameTV	23 Apr 2014	?	?	? 10/12	? 6	? 2/3	? 5	? 2	–	–	–	–	?
Hamalgama Métrica/La Provincia	25 Nov–5 Dec 2013	?	51.0	24.7; 8	24.6; 8	14.4; 4	9.9; 3	6.8; 2	7.7; 2	–	–	–	0.1
2011 municipal election	22 May 2011	—N/a	56.6	28.4; 9	27.4; 9	15.6; 5	7.5 (Note: Results for ASSPPT.); 2	5.8; 1	5.4; 1	(Note: Within CCa.)	–	–	1.0

=== Telde ===
Polling firm/Commissioner	Fieldwork date	Sample size	Turnout	NCa	PP	UxGC	PSOE	+xT	CCa	SPGT	C's	CCD	Lead
2015 municipal election	24 May 2015	—N/a	61.9	20.7; 7	8.7; 3	12.6; 4	11.5; 4	13.5; 4	8.2; 2	7.3; 2	3.6; 0	5.3; 1	7.2
Perfiles/Diario de Avisos	4–14 May 2015	?	?	20.0– 21.0; 6/7	12.0– 13.0; 3/4	8.0– 9.0; 2/3	15.0– 16.0; 4/5	9.0– 10.0; 2/3	10.0– 11.0; 3	6.0– 7.0; 1/2	6.0– 7.0; 1/2	–	5.0
Focus Investigación	21 Apr 2015	?	?	? 5	? 5	? 2	? 3	? 1	? 3	? 6	? 2	–	?
Perfiles/Diario de Avisos	7–20 Apr 2015	?	?	16.0– 17.0; 5	12.0– 13.0; 3/4	10.0– 11.0; 3	16.0– 17.0; 5	8.0– 9.0; 2/3	8.0– 9.0; 2/3	5.0– 6.0; 1/2	15.0– 16.0; 4/5	–	Tie
TSA/Canarias7	26 Mar–9 Apr 2015	?	?	18.9; 6	12.0; 3/4	? 4	? 2	? 3	11.4; 3	14.8; 4/5	? 1	–	4.1
2011 municipal election	22 May 2011	—N/a	61.3	27.6; 9	27.4; 8	12.4 (Note: Results for CIUCA.); 4	8.9; 2	8.0; 2	6.2; 2	–	–	–	0.2

== Island Cabildos ==
=== El Hierro ===
Polling firm/Commissioner	Fieldwork date	Sample size	Turnout	AHI	PSOE	PP	IUC	NCa	Podemos	C's	Lead
2015 island council election	24 May 2015	—N/a	74.8	45.1; 6	24.9; 3	13.6; 2	2.0; 2	6.6; 1	6.7; 1	–	20.2
Perfiles/Diario de Avisos	4–14 May 2015	100	?	44.0– 45.0; 7	22.0– 23.0; 3	14.0– 15.0; 2	–	8.0– 9.0; 1	–	–	22.0
Focus Investigación/Cadena SER	21 Apr 2015	?	?	? 7	? 4	? 1	–	–	? 1	–	?
Perfiles/Diario de Avisos	7–20 Apr 2015	100	?	37.0– 38.0; 6	27.0– 28.0; 4	20.0– 21.0; 2	–	–	5.0– 6.0; 0	8.0– 9.0; 1	10.0
TSA/Canarias7	26 Mar–9 Apr 2015	100	?	44.2; 7/8	19.8; 3/4	? 2/3	–	–	5.1; 0/1	5.3; 0/1	24.4
Hamalgama Métrica/La Provincia	10–28 Nov 2014	150	?	? 7	? 4	? 2	–	–	–	–	?
Celeste-Tel/Diario de Avisos	5–16 Apr 2014	150	?	48.9; 7	26.5; 4	17.4; 2	3.2; 0	4.0; 0	–	–	22.4
2011 island council election	22 May 2011	—N/a	75.7	39.4; 6	36.0; 5	19.6; 2	1.7; 0	–	–	–	3.4

=== Fuerteventura ===
Polling firm/Commissioner	Fieldwork date	Sample size	Turnout	CCa	PP	PSOE	PPM	AMF	NCa	LV	Podemos	C's	Lead
2015 island council election	24 May 2015	—N/a	59.4	30.6; 9	11.9; 3	17.6; 5	8.3; 2	4.7; 0	5.8; 1	1.3; 0	10.6; 3	2.9; 0	13.0
Perfiles/Diario de Avisos	4–14 May 2015	400	?	30.0– 31.0; 9/10	11.0– 12.0; 3/4	16.0– 17.0; 5	8.0– 9.0; 2/3	–	4.0– 5.0; 0/1	–	7.0– 8.0; 2	6.0– 7.0; 1/2	14.0
Focus Investigación/Cadena SER	21 Apr 2015	?	?	? 10	? 4/5	? 4	–	–	–	–	? 4	? 1	?
Perfiles/Diario de Avisos	7–20 Apr 2015	400	?	29.0– 30.0; 9/10	10.0– 11.0; 3	17.0– 18.0; 5/6	5.0– 6.0; 1/2	4.0– 5.0; 0/1	4.0– 5.0; 0/1	–	7.0– 8.0; 2	8.0– 9.0; 2/3	12.0
TSA/Canarias7	26 Mar–9 Apr 2015	304	?	29.9; 8/9	8.8; 2	16.5; 4/5	9.4; 2/3	2.8; 0	6.5; 1/2	–	16.3; 4/5	6.7; 1/2	13.4
Hamalgama Métrica/La Provincia	10–28 Nov 2014	400	?	? 10	? 4	? 4	? 3	–	–	–	? 2	–	?
Celeste-Tel/Diario de Avisos	5–16 Apr 2014	400	?	37.7; 10	15.1; 4	15.7; 4	10.6; 2	8.9; 2	5.6; 1	2.0; 0	–	–	22.0
2011 island council election	22 May 2011	—N/a	64.1	36.0; 9	18.1; 5	14.9; 4	13.8; 3	7.3; 2	3.6; 0	2.0; 0	–	–	17.9

=== Gran Canaria ===
Polling firm/Commissioner	Fieldwork date	Sample size	Turnout	PP	PSOE	NCa	CCa	LV	IUC	UPyD	Podemos	C's	UxGC	Lead
2015 island council election	24 May 2015	—N/a	61.6	17.5; 6	14.5; 5	26.5; 9	5.6; 1		1.5; 0	0.8; 0	13.4; 4	4.3; 0	11.3; 4	9.1
Perfiles/Diario de Avisos	4–14 May 2015	800	?	23.0– 24.0; 7/8	16.0– 17.0; 5/6	17.0– 18.0; 5/6	7.0– 8.0; 2	–	–	–	10.0– 11.0; 3	6.0– 7.0; 1/2	13.0– 14.0; 4/5	6.0
Focus Investigación/Cadena SER	21 Apr 2015	?	?	? 8	? 7	? 6	? 4	–	–	–	? 4	? 0/1	? 0/1	?
Perfiles/Diario de Avisos	7–20 Apr 2015	800	?	22.0– 23.0; 7/8	18.0– 19.0; 6	13.0– 14.0; 4/5	7.0– 8.0; 2	–	–	–	10.0– 11.0; 3/4	11.0– 12.0; 4	8.0– 9.0; 2/3	4.0
TSA/Canarias7	26 Mar–9 Apr 2015	814	?	21.5; 7	17.2; 5/6	20.7; 4/5	4.5; 0	–	–	–	11.2; 3/4	7.2; 2	11.3; 3/4	0.8
IAP	15–21 Jan 2015	600	?	28.7; 11/12	11.8; 4	19.8; 8	5.1; 1/2	–	1.8; 0	–	11.2; 4	–	–	8.9
Hamalgama Métrica/La Provincia	10–28 Nov 2014	500	66.3	? 11	? 6	? 6	7.9; 2	–	–	–	12.0; 4	–	–	?
Celeste-Tel/Diario de Avisos	5–16 Apr 2014	800	?	33.8; 11	20.6; 7	20.6; 7	12.0; 4	3.3; 0	3.7; 0	2.8; 0	–	–	–	13.2
Hamalgama Métrica/La Provincia	25 Nov–5 Dec 2013	?	56.9	33.4; 12	18.5; 7	18.3; 7	9.0; 3	3.4; 0	3.7; 0	2.8; 0	–	–	–	14.9
2011 island council election	22 May 2011	—N/a	62.3	38.8; 14	20.7; 7	15.3; 5	9.2; 3	2.7; 0	1.5; 0	1.2; 0	–	–	–	18.1

=== La Gomera ===
Polling firm/Commissioner	Fieldwork date	Sample size	Turnout	PSOE	PP	CCa	NCa	LV	CCN	IUC	UPyD	Podemos	C's	ASG	SSP	Lead
2015 island council election	24 May 2015	—N/a	77.0	15.3; 3	9.3; 1	6.3; 1	9.0; 1	–	–	–	0.3; 0	–	–	50.2; 10	9.2; 1	34.9
Perfiles/Diario de Avisos	4–14 May 2015	100	?	15.0– 16.0; 3	12.0– 13.0; 2	7.0– 8.0; 1	5.0– 6.0; 1	–	–	–	–	5.0– 6.0; 1	–	46.0– 47.0; 9	–	31.0
Focus Investigación/Cadena SER	21 Apr 2015	?	?	? 6	? 3	? 2	–	–	–	–	–	? 1	–	? 6	–	Tie
Perfiles/Diario de Avisos	7–20 Apr 2015	100	?	22.0– 23.0; 4/5	14.0– 15.0; 3	12.0– 13.0; 2	–	–	–	–	–	5.0– 6.0; 1	6.0– 7.0; 1	27.0– 28.0; 5/6	–	5.0
TSA/Canarias7	26 Mar–9 Apr 2015	150	?	11.6; 2	19.9; 4/5	9.8; 1/2	8.6; 1	–	–	–	–	–	5.8; 1	38.7; 7/8	–	18.8
Celeste-Tel	24 Feb 2015	600	71.8	12.7; 2	20.2; 4	? 1	–	–	–	–	–	–	–	46.6; 9	? 1	26.4
Celeste-Tel	13 Jan 2015	?	?	9.9; 1	? 3	? 1	–	–	–	–	–	? 2	–	41.2; 10	–	?
Celeste-Tel	13 Jan 2015	?	?	47.2; 10	? 4	? 1	–	–	–	–	–	? 2	–	–	–	?
Hamalgama Métrica/La Provincia	10–28 Nov 2014	150	?	54.0; 11	14.7; 3	11.7; 2	4.3; 0	2.2; 0	3.6; 0	–	–	8.2; 1	–	–	–	39.3
Celeste-Tel/PSOE	1 Nov 2014	500	72.1	51.4; 11	18.9; 4	8.8; 1	4.4; 0	3.5; 0	4.4; 0	–	–	8.6; 1	–	–	–	?
Celeste-Tel/Diario de Avisos	5–16 Apr 2014	150	?	45.7; 9	18.9; 3	15.3; 3	9.7; 2	3.5; 0	–	4.5; 0	2.4; 0	–	–	–	–	26.8
2011 island council election	22 May 2011	—N/a	78.1	52.1; 10	26.5; 5	12.6; 2	4.2; 0	3.5; 0		–	–	–	–	–	–	25.6

=== La Palma ===
Polling firm/Commissioner	Fieldwork date	Sample size	Turnout	CCa	PP	PSOE	NCa	LV	IUC	UPyD	Podemos	C's	Lead
2015 island council election	24 May 2015	—N/a	66.7	29.4; 7	22.9; 5	31.4; 8	2.7; 0		2.9; 0	1.1; 0	5.0; 1	2.9; 0	2.0
Perfiles/Diario de Avisos	4–14 May 2015	?	?	29.0– 30.0; 7/8	21.0– 22.0; 5	30.0– 31.0; 7/8	–	–	–	–	6.0– 7.0; 1	–	1.0
Focus Investigación/Cadena SER	21 Apr 2015	?	?	? 6/7	? 5/6	? 6/7	–	–	–	–	? 1	? 1	Tie
Perfiles/Diario de Avisos	7–20 Apr 2015	400	?	31.0– 32.0; 7/8	21.0– 22.0; 5	27.0– 28.0; 6/7	–	–	–	–	4.0– 5.0; 0/1	5.0– 6.0; 1	4.0
TSA/Canarias7	26 Mar–9 Apr 2015	302	?	35.8; 8/9	20.5; 4/5	23.6; 5/6	5.1; 1	–	–	–	–	5.7; 1	12.2
Hamalgama Métrica/La Provincia	10–28 Nov 2014	300	?	? 8	? 6	? 6	–	–	–	–	? 1	–	?
Celeste-Tel/Diario de Avisos	5–16 Apr 2014	400	?	34.7; 8	25.3; 6	28.1; 6	5.0; 1	1.4; 0	4.0; 0	0.8; 0	–	–	6.6
2011 island council election	22 May 2011	—N/a	71.1	39.6; 9	28.2; 6	24.5; 6	2.2; 0	1.9; 0	1.5; 0	0.7; 0	–	–	11.4

=== Lanzarote ===
Polling firm/Commissioner	Fieldwork date	Sample size	Turnout	CCa	PP	PSOE	PIL	SL	NCa	IUC	Podemos	C's	Lead
2015 island council election	24 May 2015	—N/a	52.5	24.2; 7	12.0; 3	19.1; 5	6.7; 1	6.9; 2	6.6; 1	2.0; 0	12.5; 3	5.3; 1	5.1
Perfiles/Diario de Avisos	4–14 May 2015	400	?	25.0– 26.0; 7/8	14.0– 15.0; 4	23.0– 24.0; 6/7	6.0– 7.0; 1/2	5.0– 6.0; 1	4.0– 5.0; 0/1	–	7.0– 8.0; 2	6.0– 7.0; 1/2	2.0
Focus Investigación/Cadena SER	21 Apr 2015	?	?	? 7/8	? 3/4	? 5/6	? 3/4	–	–	–	? 4	? 0/1	?
Perfiles/Diario de Avisos	7–20 Apr 2015	400	?	27.0– 28.0; 7/8	14.0– 15.0; 3/4	14.0– 15.0; 3/4	7.0– 8.0; 1/2	–	6.0– 7.0; 1/2	–	13.0– 14.0; 3/4	7.0– 8.0; 1/2	13.0
TSA/Canarias7	26 Mar–9 Apr 2015	302	?	29.2; 7/8	14.5; 3/4	14.6; 3/4	11.8; 3	6.4; 1	7.3; 1/2	–	7.8; 2	–	14.6
Hamalgama Métrica/La Provincia	10–28 Nov 2014	400	?	? 8	? 5	? 4	? 3	–	–	–	? 3	–	?
Celeste-Tel/Diario de Avisos	5–16 Apr 2014	400	?	30.9; 8	17.5; 4	19.4; 5	15.6; 4	5.4; 1	3.6; 0	5.1; 1	–	–	11.5
2011 island council election	22 May 2011	—N/a	54.9	31.3; 9	22.3; 6	15.7; 4	12.7; 3	5.1 (Note: Results for AC25M.); 1	4.2; 0	1.8; 0	–	–	9.0

=== Tenerife ===
Polling firm/Commissioner	Fieldwork date	Sample size	Turnout	CCa	PP	PSOE	IUC	SSP	LV	UPyD	NCa	Podemos	C's	Lead
2015 island council election	24 May 2015	—N/a	61.6	28.6; 10	19.4; 6	20.6; 7	2.7; 0	–		1.0; 0	2.2; 0	13.9; 5	5.5; 1	8.0
Perfiles/Diario de Avisos	4–14 May 2015	800	?	28.0– 29.0; 10/11	18.0– 19.0; 6/7	16.0– 17.0; 6/7	–	–	–	–	–	10.0– 11.0; 3/4	9.0– 10.0; 3/4	10.0
Focus Investigación/Cadena SER	21 Apr 2015	?	?	31.8; 10/11	18.4; 6	22.9; 7/8	? 0/1	–	–	–	–	10.8; 3	6.2; 2	8.9
Perfiles/Diario de Avisos	7–20 Apr 2015	800	?	27.0– 28.0; 10/11	18.0– 19.0; 6/7	19.0– 20.0; 7	4.0– 5.0; 0/1	–	–	–	–	9.0– 10.0; 3	8.0– 9.0; 2	8.0
TSA/Canarias7	26 Mar–9 Apr 2015	807	?	33.5; 10/11	17.9; 5/6	18.1; 5/6	–	–	–	–	6.5; 2	9.7; 3	7.9; 2	15.4
Hamalgama Métrica/La Provincia	10–28 Nov 2014	500	67.4	? 12	? 8	? 6	–	? 1	–	–	? 2	? 2	–	?
Celeste-Tel/Diario de Avisos	5–16 Apr 2014	800	?	34.1; 11	20.5; 7	19.4; 6	8.7; 3	7.9; 2	2.8; 0	2.5; 0	–	–	–	13.6
Hamalgama Métrica/La Provincia	25 Nov–5 Dec 2013	?	57.8	34.4; 12	24.7; 9	18.2; 6	7.2; 2	6.7; 2	–	–	–	–	–	9.7
2011 island council election	22 May 2011	—N/a	63.8	38.3; 15	24.9; 9	19.7; 7	4.8; 0	4.5; 0	2.0; 0	0.9; 0	–	–	–	13.4
