= 2007 Spanish local elections in the Canary Islands =

This article presents the results breakdown of the local elections held in the Canary Islands on 27 May 2007. The following tables show detailed results in the autonomous community's most populous municipalities, sorted alphabetically.

== City control ==
The following table lists party control in the most populous municipalities, including provincial capitals (shown in bold). Gains for a party are displayed with the cell's background shaded in that party's colour.

Municipality	Population	Previous control	New control
Arona	69,100	Canarian Coalition–Canarian Nationalist Party (CC–PNC)	Canarian Coalition–Canarian Nationalist Party (CC–PNC)
**Las Palmas de Gran Canaria**	377,056	People's Party (PP)	Spanish Socialist Workers' Party (PSOE)
San Cristóbal de La Laguna	142,161	Canarian Coalition–Canarian Nationalist Party (CC–PNC)	Canarian Coalition–Canarian Nationalist Party (CC–PNC)
**Santa Cruz de Tenerife**	223,148	Canarian Coalition–Canarian Nationalist Party (CC–PNC)	Canarian Coalition–Canarian Nationalist Party (CC–PNC)
Telde	97,525	People's Party (PP)	New Canaries (NCa)

== Municipalities ==
=== Arona ===
Population: 69,100

← Summary of the 27 May 2007 City Council of Arona election results →
Parties and alliances	Popular vote			Seats	
Parties and alliances	Votes	%	±pp	Total	+/−
Canarian Coalition–Canarian Nationalist Party (CC–PNC)^{1}	8,067	44.42	+17.83	**13**	+6
Spanish Socialist Workers' Party (PSOE)	3,913	21.55	−3.34	**6**	−1
People's Party (PP)	2,750	15.14	−1.75	**4**	±0
Centre of Arona (CAN)	1,736	9.56	−12.34	**2**	−4
Reformist Canarian Centre (CCR)	795	4.38	−1.99	0	−1
The Greens–Green Group (LV–GV)	720	3.96	New	0	±0
Blank ballots	179	0.99	+0.25		
**Total**	**18,160**			**25**	**±0**
Valid votes	18,160	99.29	−0.23		
Invalid votes	130	0.71	+0.23		
**Votes cast / turnout**	**18,290**	**48.61**	**−2.05**		
Abstentions	19,333	51.39	+2.05		
**Registered voters**	**37,623**				
Sources
Footnotes: ^{1} Canarian Coalition–Canarian Nationalist Party results are compared to the combined totals of Canarian Coalition and Canarian Nationalist Federation in the 2003 election.

=== Las Palmas de Gran Canaria ===
Population: 377,056

← Summary of the 27 May 2007 City Council of Las Palmas de Gran Canaria election results →
Parties and alliances	Popular vote			Seats	
Parties and alliances	Votes	%	±pp	Total	+/−
Spanish Socialist Workers' Party (PSOE)	70,783	41.90	+13.69	**15**	+6
People's Party (PP)	61,255	36.26	−9.98	**12**	−3
Commitment to Gran Canaria (CGCa)	10,290	6.09	New	**2**	+2
New Canaries–New Gran Canaria (NCa)	7,667	4.54	New	0	±0
The Greens (Verdes)	4,839	2.86	+0.57	0	±0
Canarian Coalition–Canarian Nationalist Party (CC–PNC)^{1}	4,449	2.63	−15.58	0	−5
Canarian Centre (CCN)	2,978	1.76	New	0	±0
Canarian United Left (IUC)	1,053	0.62	−1.04	0	±0
Nationalist Maga Alternative (AMAGA)	837	0.50	New	0	±0
Party of Gran Canaria (PGC)	550	0.33	New	0	±0
United Neighbours (VU)	529	0.31	−0.39	0	±0
Communist Party of the Canarian People (PCPC)	374	0.22	−0.10	0	±0
Unity of the People (UP)	303	0.18	New	0	±0
Canarian Popular Alternative (APCa)	257	0.15	−0.07	0	±0
Humanist Party (PH)	181	0.11	−0.07	0	±0
Blank ballots	2,586	1.53	−0.30		
**Total**	**168,931**			**29**	**±0**
Valid votes	168,931	99.37	−0.08		
Invalid votes	1,078	0.63	+0.08		
**Votes cast / turnout**	**170,009**	**56.84**	**−4.63**		
Abstentions	129,077	43.16	+4.63		
**Registered voters**	**299,086**				
Sources
Footnotes: ^{1} Canarian Coalition–Canarian Nationalist Party results are compared to the combined totals of Canarian Coalition and Canarian Union–Canarian Nationalist Federation in the 2003 election.

=== San Cristóbal de La Laguna ===
Population: 142,161

← Summary of the 27 May 2007 City Council of San Cristóbal de La Laguna election results →
Parties and alliances	Popular vote			Seats	
Parties and alliances	Votes	%	±pp	Total	+/−
Canarian Coalition–Canarian Nationalist Party (CC–PNC)^{1}	31,278	46.71	+4.54	**15**	+3
Spanish Socialist Workers' Party (PSOE)	18,358	27.42	−9.82	**9**	−2
People's Party (PP)	7,272	10.86	−2.01	**3**	−1
Canarian Centre (CCN)	2,797	4.18	New	0	±0
Yes We Can for Tenerife Alternative (ASSPPT)^{2}	2,577	3.85	+2.96	0	±0
The Greens–United Left–Citizens' Union–United for La Laguna (LV–IU–UC–ULL)^{3}	2,009	3.00	−0.42	0	±0
Canarian Nationalist Alternative (ANC)	542	0.81	New	0	±0
Independent Democratic Citizen Alternative (ACDI)	426	0.64	New	0	±0
Commitment to Tenerife (CTF)	212	0.32	New	0	±0
Communist Party of the Canarian People (PCPC)	191	0.29	New	0	±0
Centre Coalition (CCCAN)	136	0.20	New	0	±0
Humanist Party (PH)	134	0.20	+0.05	0	±0
Blank ballots	1,028	1.54	+0.35		
**Total**	**66,960**			**27**	**±0**
Valid votes	66,960	99.36	−0.12		
Invalid votes	428	0.64	+0.12		
**Votes cast / turnout**	**67,388**	**57.69**	**+2.52**		
Abstentions	49,420	42.31	−2.52		
**Registered voters**	**116,808**				
Sources
Footnotes: ^{1} Canarian Coalition–Canarian Nationalist Party results are compared to the combined totals of Canarian Coalition and Canarian Nationalist Federation in the 2003 election.; ^{2} Yes We Can for Tenerife Alternative results are compared to Canarian Popular Alternative totals in the 2003 election.; ^{3} The Greens–United Left–Citizens' Union–United for La Laguna results are compared to the combined totals of The Greens of the Canaries and Canarian United Left in the 2003 election.

=== Santa Cruz de Tenerife ===
Population: 223,148

← Summary of the 27 May 2007 City Council of Santa Cruz de Tenerife election results →
Parties and alliances	Popular vote			Seats	
Parties and alliances	Votes	%	±pp	Total	+/−
Canarian Coalition–Canarian Nationalist Party (CC–PNC)^{1}	32,325	35.22	−20.28	**11**	−6
Spanish Socialist Workers' Party (PSOE)	22,102	24.08	+5.35	**7**	+2
People's Party (PP)	17,329	18.88	+1.38	**6**	+1
Citizens of Santa Cruz (CSC)	6,475	7.05	New	**2**	+2
Canarian Centre (CCN)	4,874	5.31	New	**1**	+1
Yes We Can for Tenerife Alternative (ASSPPT)^{2}	2,258	2.46	+0.39	0	±0
The Greens–United Left–Citizens' Union–United for Tenerife (LV–IU–UC–UPT)^{3}	2,162	2.36	−1.98	0	±0
The Greens–Green Group (LV–GV)	1,580	1.72	New	0	±0
Canarian Nationalist Alternative (ANC)	586	0.64	New	0	±0
Centre Coalition (CCCAN)	227	0.25	New	0	±0
Communist Party of the Canarian People (PCPC)	165	0.18	New	0	±0
Blank ballots	1,701	1.85	+0.33		
**Total**	**91,784**			**27**	**±0**
Valid votes	91,784	99.50	−0.01		
Invalid votes	460	0.50	+0.01		
**Votes cast / turnout**	**92,244**	**50.22**	**−1.10**		
Abstentions	91,431	49.78	+1.10		
**Registered voters**	**183,675**				
Sources
Footnotes: ^{1} Canarian Coalition–Canarian Nationalist Party results are compared to the combined totals of Canarian Coalition and Canarian Nationalist Federation in the 2003 election.; ^{2} Yes We Can for Tenerife Alternative results are compared to Canarian Popular Alternative totals in the 2003 election.; ^{3} The Greens–United Left–Citizens' Union–United for Tenerife results are compared to the combined totals of The Greens of the Canaries and Canarian United Left in the 2003 election.

=== Telde ===
Population: 97,525

← Summary of the 27 May 2007 City Council of Telde election results →
Parties and alliances	Popular vote			Seats	
Parties and alliances	Votes	%	±pp	Total	+/−
New Canaries–New Gran Canaria (NCa)	14,712	30.70	New	**9**	+9
People's Party (PP)	10,329	21.56	−7.43	**7**	−1
Spanish Socialist Workers' Party (PSOE)	8,056	16.81	+6.70	**5**	+3
Citizens for Canarian Change–Federal Group of Jinámar Valley (CIUCA–AFV)	4,973	10.38	−9.74	**3**	−2
Canarian Centre (CCN)	2,921	6.10	New	**1**	+1
Canarian Coalition–Canarian Nationalist Party (CC–PNC)	2,253	4.70	−31.37	0	−10
The Greens (Verdes)	1,113	2.32	+0.68	0	±0
Canarian United Left (IUC)	1,018	2.12	+1.18	0	±0
United Neighbours (VU)	629	1.31	New	0	±0
Canarian People for the Canaries (CparaC)	592	1.24	New	0	±0
Commitment to Gran Canaria (CGCa)	295	0.62	New	0	±0
Telde Progressive Party (PPT)	111	0.23	New	0	±0
Pensionist Assembly of the Canaries (TPC)	78	0.16	New	0	±0
Party of Gran Canaria (PGC)	76	0.16	New	0	±0
Blank ballots	762	1.59	−0.65		
**Total**	**47,918**			**25**	**±0**
Valid votes	47,918	99.41	−0.10		
Invalid votes	283	0.59	+0.10		
**Votes cast / turnout**	**48,201**	**63.04**	**−5.85**		
Abstentions	28,263	36.96	+5.85		
**Registered voters**	**76,464**				

== See also ==
- 2007 Canarian regional election
