= 2003 Spanish local elections in the Canary Islands =

This article presents the results breakdown of the local elections held in the Canary Islands on 25 May 2003. The following tables show detailed results in the autonomous community's most populous municipalities, sorted alphabetically.

== City control ==
The following table lists party control in the most populous municipalities, including provincial capitals (highlighted in bold). Gains for a party are highlighted in that party's colour.

Municipality	Population	Previous control	New control
Arona	52,572	Canarian Coalition (CC)	Canarian Coalition (CC)
**Las Palmas de Gran Canaria**	370,649	People's Party (PP)	People's Party (PP)
San Cristóbal de La Laguna	135,004	Canarian Coalition (CC)	Canarian Coalition (CC)
**Santa Cruz de Tenerife**	217,415	Canarian Coalition (CC)	Canarian Coalition (CC)
Telde	91,160	Canarian Coalition (CC)	People's Party (PP)

== Municipalities ==
=== Arona ===
Population: 52,572

← Summary of the 25 May 2003 City Council of Arona election results →
Parties and alliances	Popular vote			Seats	
Parties and alliances	Votes	%	±pp	Total	+/−
Canarian Coalition (CC)	4,201	26.18	−3.02	**7**	±0
Spanish Socialist Workers' Party (PSOE)	3,993	24.89	−8.30	**7**	−1
Centre of Arona (CAN)	3,514	21.90	New	**6**	+6
People's Party (PP)	2,710	16.89	−1.25	**4**	±0
Reformist Canarian Centre (CCR)	1,022	6.37	New	**1**	+1
The Greens of the Canaries (Verdes)	422	2.63	New	0	±0
Canarian Nationalist Party (PNC)	65	0.41	−1.51	0	±0
Centrist Union–Democratic and Social Centre (UC–CDS)	n/a	n/a	−11.71	0	−2
Blank ballots	118	0.74	−0.18		
**Total**	**16,045**			**25**	**+4**
Valid votes	16,045	99.52	+0.12		
Invalid votes	78	0.48	−0.12		
**Votes cast / turnout**	**16,123**	**50.66**	**+1.40**		
Abstentions	15,701	49.34	−1.40		
**Registered voters**	**31,824**				

=== Las Palmas de Gran Canaria ===
Population: 370,649

← Summary of the 25 May 2003 City Council of Las Palmas de Gran Canaria election results →
Parties and alliances	Popular vote			Seats	
Parties and alliances	Votes	%	±pp	Total	+/−
People's Party (PP)	84,204	46.24	−11.30	**15**	−4
Spanish Socialist Workers' Party (PSOE)	51,374	28.21	+13.42	**9**	+4
Canarian Coalition–Commitment for Las Palmas de Gran Canaria (CC–CLP)	26,377	14.48	+0.59	**5**	+1
Canarian Union–Canarian Nationalist Federation (UC–FNC)^{1}	6,796	3.73	+3.05	0	±0
The Greens of the Canaries (Verdes)	4,166	2.29	New	0	±0
Canarian United Left (IUC)	3,025	1.66	−2.38	0	±0
United Neighbours (VU)	1,281	0.70	New	0	±0
Communist Party of the Canarian People (PCPC)	578	0.32	New	0	±0
Canarian Popular Alternative (APCa)	406	0.22	New	0	±0
Humanist Party (PH)	328	0.18	−0.24	0	±0
Pensionist Assembly of the Canaries (TPC)	236	0.13	−0.09	0	±0
Party of Gran Canaria (PGC)	n/a	n/a	−5.88	0	−1
Blank ballots	3,341	1.83	+0.37		
**Total**	**182,112**			**29**	**±0**
Valid votes	182,112	99.45	+0.10		
Invalid votes	1,014	0.55	−0.10		
**Votes cast / turnout**	**183,126**	**61.47**	**+6.84**		
Abstentions	114,807	38.53	−6.84		
**Registered voters**	**297,933**				
Sources
Footnotes: ^{1} Canarian Union–Canarian Nationalist Federation results are compared to Canarian Nationalist Party totals in the 1999 election.

=== San Cristóbal de La Laguna ===
Population: 135,004

← Summary of the 25 May 2003 City Council of San Cristóbal de La Laguna election results →
Parties and alliances	Popular vote			Seats	
Parties and alliances	Votes	%	±pp	Total	+/−
Canarian Coalition (CC)	26,485	40.43	+8.56	**12**	+2
Spanish Socialist Workers' Party (PSOE)	24,395	37.24	−2.95	**11**	−2
People's Party (PP)	8,431	12.87	−2.12	**4**	±0
The Greens of the Canaries (Verdes)	1,430	2.18	+0.15	0	±0
Canarian Nationalist Party (PNC)	1,137	1.74	−3.11	0	±0
Canarian Socialist Action Movement (MASCA)	839	1.28	New	0	±0
Canarian United Left (IUC)	810	1.24	−1.61	0	±0
Canarian Popular Alternative (APCa)	581	0.89	New	0	±0
Canarian Management Assembly (AGC)	276	0.42	New	0	±0
Tenerife Union (UTI)	129	0.20	New	0	±0
Reformist Canarian Centre (CCR)	121	0.18	New	0	±0
Humanist Party (PH)	98	0.15	−0.22	0	±0
Blank ballots	777	1.19	−0.56		
**Total**	**65,509**			**27**	**±0**
Valid votes	65,509	99.48	+0.19		
Invalid votes	340	0.52	−0.19		
**Votes cast / turnout**	**65,849**	**55.17**	**−1.75**		
Abstentions	53,507	44.83	+1.75		
**Registered voters**	**119,356**				

=== Santa Cruz de Tenerife ===
Population: 217,415

← Summary of the 25 May 2003 City Council of Santa Cruz de Tenerife election results →
Parties and alliances	Popular vote			Seats	
Parties and alliances	Votes	%	±pp	Total	+/−
Canarian Coalition (CC)	43,002	46.09	−11.37	**14**	−4
Spanish Socialist Workers' Party (PSOE)	17,475	18.73	+5.30	**5**	+1
People's Party (PP)	16,326	17.50	+0.78	**5**	±0
Canarian Nationalist Party (PNC)	8,785	9.41	+6.08	**3**	+3
The Greens of the Canaries (Verdes)	2,494	2.67	+1.12	0	±0
Canarian Popular Alternative (APCa)	1,936	2.07	New	0	±0
Canarian United Left (IUC)	1,559	1.67	−2.06	0	±0
Reformist Canarian Centre (CCR)	312	0.33	New	0	±0
Blank ballots	1,420	1.52	−0.51		
**Total**	**93,309**			**27**	**±0**
Valid votes	93,309	99.51	+0.18		
Invalid votes	455	0.49	−0.18		
**Votes cast / turnout**	**93,764**	**51.32**	**+2.22**		
Abstentions	88,926	48.68	−2.22		
**Registered voters**	**182,690**				

=== Telde ===
Population: 91,160

← Summary of the 25 May 2003 City Council of Telde election results →
Parties and alliances	Popular vote			Seats	
Parties and alliances	Votes	%	±pp	Total	+/−
Canarian Coalition (CC)	17,975	36.07	−15.19	**10**	−5
People's Party (PP)	14,446	28.99	+1.86	**8**	±0
Federal Group of Jinámar Valley–Citizens for Change Platform (AFV–CIUCA)	10,026	20.12	+14.17	**5**	+4
Spanish Socialist Workers' Party (PSOE)	5,041	10.11	+3.34	**2**	+1
The Greens of the Canaries (Verdes)	816	1.64	New	0	±0
Coalition for Telde (CT)	496	1.00	New	0	±0
Canarian United Left (IUC)	466	0.94	−1.79	0	±0
Socialists of the Canaries (SDC)	106	0.21	New	0	±0
Blank ballots	467	0.94	+0.01		
**Total**	**49,839**			**25**	**±0**
Valid votes	49,839	99.51	+0.36		
Invalid votes	243	0.49	−0.36		
**Votes cast / turnout**	**50,082**	**68.89**	**+5.06**		
Abstentions	22,617	31.11	−5.06		
**Registered voters**	**72,699**				

== See also ==
- 2003 Canarian regional election
