= 2023 Spanish local elections in the Canary Islands =

This article presents the results breakdown of the local elections held in the Canary Islands on 28 May 2023. The following tables show detailed results in the autonomous community's most populous municipalities, sorted alphabetically.

== City control ==
The following table lists party control in the most populous municipalities, including provincial capitals (shown in bold). Gains for a party are displayed with the cell's background shaded in that party's colour.

| Municipality | Population | Previous control | New control |
|---|---|---|---|
| Arona | 82,982 | Spanish Socialist Workers' Party (PSOE) | People's Party (PP) |
| **Las Palmas de Gran Canaria** | 378,797 | Spanish Socialist Workers' Party (PSOE) | Spanish Socialist Workers' Party (PSOE) |
| San Cristóbal de La Laguna | 157,815 | Spanish Socialist Workers' Party (PSOE) | Spanish Socialist Workers' Party (PSOE) |
| **Santa Cruz de Tenerife** | 208,688 | Canarian Coalition (CCa) | Canarian Coalition (CCa) |
| Telde | 102,472 | New Canaries (NCa) | Citizens for Canarian Change (CIUCA) |

== Municipalities ==
=== Arona ===
Population: 82,982

← Summary of the 28 May 2023 City Council of Arona election results →
| Parties and alliances | Popular vote | | | Seats | |
| Parties and alliances | Votes | % | ±pp | Total | +/− |
|---|---|---|---|---|---|
| Spanish Socialist Workers' Party (PSOE) | 6,088 | 29.30 | −18.53 | **8** | −6 |
| People's Party (PP) | 3,482 | 16.76 | +3.46 | **5** | +2 |
| Canarian Coalition (CCa) | 3,408 | 16.40 | +1.28 | **5** | +1 |
| More for Arona (+PorArona) | 3,169 | 15.25 | New | **4** | +4 |
| Vox (Vox) | 1,788 | 8.61 | New | **2** | +2 |
| New Canaries–Canarist Broad Front (NC–FAC) | 1,071 | 5.15 | New | **1** | +1 |
| Drago Greens Canaries (DVC) | 514 | 2.47 | New | 0 | ±0 |
| United Yes We Can (USP)^{1} | 433 | 2.08 | −5.83 | 0 | −1 |
| Canarian Force Democratic Unity (FCUD) | 375 | 1.80 | New | 0 | ±0 |
| Movement of the People (MDP) | 144 | 0.69 | −0.28 | 0 | ±0 |
| Citizens for Arona (CxArona) | n/a | n/a | −6.81 | 0 | −2 |
| Citizens–Party of the Citizenry (CS) | n/a | n/a | −5.22 | 0 | −1 |
| Blank ballots | 304 | 1.46 | +0.67 | | |
| **Total** | **20,776** | | | **25** | **±0** |
| Valid votes | 20,776 | 98.26 | −1.03 | | |
| Invalid votes | 367 | 1.74 | +1.03 | | |
| **Votes cast / turnout** | **21,143** | **38.80** | **+0.89** | | |
| Abstentions | 33,356 | 61.20 | −0.89 | | |
| **Registered voters** | **54,499** | | | | |
Sources
Footnotes: ^{1} United Yes We Can results are compared to the combined totals of Yes We Can Arona and United Left in the 2019 election.

=== Las Palmas de Gran Canaria ===
Population: 378,797

← Summary of the 28 May 2023 City Council of Las Palmas de Gran Canaria election results →
| Parties and alliances | Popular vote | | | Seats | |
| Parties and alliances | Votes | % | ±pp | Total | +/− |
|---|---|---|---|---|---|
| Spanish Socialist Workers' Party (PSOE) | 50,494 | 33.08 | +1.35 | **12** | +1 |
| People's Party (PP) | 41,515 | 27.20 | +5.00 | **9** | +2 |
| Vox (Vox) | 17,233 | 11.29 | +8.13 | **4** | +4 |
| New Canaries–Canarist Broad Front (NC–FAC) | 9,347 | 6.12 | −3.38 | **2** | −1 |
| United Yes We Can (USP) | 8,191 | 5.37 | −5.02 | **1** | −2 |
| Canarian Coalition (CCa)^{1} | 7,944 | 5.20 | −3.18 | **1** | −1 |
| United for Gran Canaria (UxGC) | 5,066 | 3.32 | New | 0 | ±0 |
| Drago Greens Canaries (DVC) | 2,875 | 1.88 | New | 0 | ±0 |
| Let's Talk Now (Hablemos Ahora) | 2,598 | 1.70 | New | 0 | ±0 |
| Animalist Party with the Environment (PACMA)^{2} | 1,970 | 1.29 | −0.03 | 0 | ±0 |
| Citizens–Party of the Citizenry (CS) | 643 | 0.42 | −9.09 | 0 | −3 |
| Seniors in Action (3e) | 535 | 0.35 | +0.20 | 0 | ±0 |
| Canarian Nationalist Party (PNC) | 527 | 0.35 | New | 0 | ±0 |
| Canaries Now–Communist Party of the Canarian People (ANC–UP–PCPC)^{3} | 514 | 0.34 | −0.37 | 0 | ±0 |
| Gather Sustainable Canaries (Reunir) | 489 | 0.32 | New | 0 | ±0 |
| With You, We Are Democracy (Contigo) | 197 | 0.13 | New | 0 | ±0 |
| Blank ballots | 2,499 | 1.64 | +0.59 | | |
| **Total** | **152,637** | | | **29** | **±0** |
| Valid votes | 152,637 | 98.62 | −0.60 | | |
| Invalid votes | 2,140 | 1.38 | +0.60 | | |
| **Votes cast / turnout** | **154,777** | **50.75** | **+0.04** | | |
| Abstentions | 150,192 | 49.25 | −0.04 | | |
| **Registered voters** | **304,969** | | | | |
Sources
Footnotes: ^{1} Canarian Coalition results are compared to Canarian Coalition–United for Gran Canaria totals in the 2019 election.; ^{2} Animalist Party with the Environment results are compared to Animalist Party Against Mistreatment of Animals totals in the 2019 election.; ^{3} Canaries Now–Communist Party of the Canarian People results are compared to the combined totals of Communist Party of the Canarian People and Canaries Now in the 2019 election.

=== San Cristóbal de La Laguna ===
Population: 157,815

← Summary of the 28 May 2023 City Council of San Cristóbal de La Laguna election results →
| Parties and alliances | Popular vote | | | Seats | |
| Parties and alliances | Votes | % | ±pp | Total | +/− |
|---|---|---|---|---|---|
| Spanish Socialist Workers' Party (PSOE)^{1} | 23,459 | 32.56 | −0.19 | **10** | +1 |
| Canarian Coalition (CCa)^{2} | 19,713 | 27.36 | −0.29 | **8** | −1 |
| People's Party (PP) | 8,827 | 12.25 | +4.46 | **3** | +1 |
| Vox (Vox) | 5,379 | 7.47 | +5.18 | **2** | +2 |
| United We Can (USP) | 5,260 | 7.30 | −9.68 | **2** | −3 |
| Drago Greens Canaries (DVC) | 4,452 | 6.18 | New | **2** | +2 |
| Animalist Party with the Environment (PACMA) | 1,642 | 2.28 | New | 0 | ±0 |
| New Canaries–Canarist Broad Front (NC–FAC) | 1,542 | 2.14 | −0.11 | 0 | ±0 |
| Citizens–Party of the Citizenry (CS) | 490 | 0.68 | −6.42 | 0 | −2 |
| Gather Sustainable Canaries (Reunir) | 227 | 0.32 | New | 0 | ±0 |
| Blank ballots | 1,057 | 1.47 | +0.44 | | |
| **Total** | **72,048** | | | **27** | **±0** |
| Valid votes | 72,048 | 98.66 | −0.37 | | |
| Invalid votes | 982 | 1.34 | +0.37 | | |
| **Votes cast / turnout** | **73,030** | **56.57** | **+0.99** | | |
| Abstentions | 56,073 | 43.43 | −0.99 | | |
| **Registered voters** | **129,103** | | | | |
Sources
Footnotes: ^{1} Spanish Socialist Workers' Party results are compared to the combined totals of Spanish Socialist Workers' Party and La Laguna Ahead in the 2019 election.; ^{2} Canarian Coalition results are compared to Canarian Coalition–Canarian Nationalist Party totals in the 2019 election.

=== Santa Cruz de Tenerife ===
Population: 208,688

← Summary of the 28 May 2023 City Council of Santa Cruz de Tenerife election results →
| Parties and alliances | Popular vote | | | Seats | |
| Parties and alliances | Votes | % | ±pp | Total | +/− |
|---|---|---|---|---|---|
| Spanish Socialist Workers' Party (PSOE) | 27,142 | 30.16 | +3.80 | **10** | +1 |
| Canarian Coalition (CCa)^{1} | 26,032 | 28.93 | −1.91 | **9** | −1 |
| People's Party (PP) | 14,474 | 16.08 | +6.42 | **5** | +2 |
| Vox (Vox) | 7,884 | 8.76 | +5.64 | **3** | +3 |
| United Yes We Can (USP)^{2} | 4,048 | 4.50 | −10.49 | 0 | −3 |
| Drago Greens Canaries (DVC) | 3,235 | 3.59 | New | 0 | ±0 |
| Animalist Party with the Environment (PACMA)^{3} | 2,421 | 2.69 | +1.11 | 0 | ±0 |
| New Canaries–Canarist Broad Front (NC–FAC) | 1,457 | 1.62 | −0.08 | 0 | ±0 |
| Citizens–Party of the Citizenry (CS) | 1,061 | 1.18 | −7.18 | 0 | −2 |
| Gather Sustainable Canaries (Reunir) | 237 | 0.26 | New | 0 | ±0 |
| Canaries Now–Communist Party of the Canarian People (ANC–UP–PCPC)^{4} | 234 | 0.26 | −0.26 | 0 | ±0 |
| Canarian Nationalist Party (PNC) | 218 | 0.24 | New | 0 | ±0 |
| Political Reset (Reset) | 140 | 0.16 | New | 0 | ±0 |
| Blank ballots | 1,412 | 1.57 | +0.78 | | |
| **Total** | **89,995** | | | **27** | **±0** |
| Valid votes | 89,995 | 98.84 | −0.58 | | |
| Invalid votes | 1,055 | 1.16 | +0.58 | | |
| **Votes cast / turnout** | **91,050** | **54.35** | **+0.95** | | |
| Abstentions | 76,482 | 45.65 | −0.95 | | |
| **Registered voters** | **167,532** | | | | |
Sources
Footnotes: ^{1} Canarian Coalition results are compared to Canarian Coalition–Canarian Nationalist Party totals in the 2019 election.; ^{2} United We Can] results are compared to the combined totals of United We Can–United Left–Equo and Yes We Can in the 2019 election.; ^{3} Animalist Party with the Environment results are compared to Animalist Party Against Mistreatment of Animals totals in the 2019 election.; ^{4} Canaries Now–Communist Party of the Canarian People results are compared to the combined totals of Canaries Now and Communist Party of the Canarian People in the 2019 election.

=== Telde ===
Population: 102,472

← Summary of the 28 May 2023 City Council of Telde election results →
| Parties and alliances | Popular vote | | | Seats | |
| Parties and alliances | Votes | % | ±pp | Total | +/− |
|---|---|---|---|---|---|
| Citizens for Canarian Change (CIUCA) | 10,223 | 22.20 | +11.77 | **7** | +4 |
| Spanish Socialist Workers' Party (PSOE) | 6,949 | 15.09 | −5.11 | **5** | −1 |
| New Canaries–Canarist Broad Front (NC–FAC) | 6,545 | 14.21 | −10.07 | **4** | −4 |
| People's Party (PP) | 6,200 | 13.46 | +6.22 | **4** | +2 |
| Canarian Coalition (CCa)^{1} | 4,440 | 9.64 | −2.57 | **3** | −1 |
| Vox (Vox) | 2,883 | 6.26 | +4.24 | **2** | +2 |
| More for Telde (+xT) | 2,732 | 5.93 | −1.18 | **2** | ±0 |
| United for Gran Canaria (UxGC) | 1,133 | 2.46 | New | 0 | ±0 |
| Progressive Left of Telde (IPTelde) | 987 | 2.14 | New | 0 | ±0 |
| United Yes We Can (USP) | 957 | 2.08 | −4.70 | 0 | −2 |
| Drago Greens Canaries (DVC) | 742 | 1.61 | New | 0 | ±0 |
| Let's Talk Now (Hablemos Ahora) | 581 | 1.26 | New | 0 | ±0 |
| La Pepa What is Ours (Lo Nuestro) | 342 | 0.74 | New | 0 | ±0 |
| Roque de Gando (RDG) | 259 | 0.56 | −0.47 | 0 | ±0 |
| Gather Sustainable Canaries (Reunir) | 136 | 0.30 | New | 0 | ±0 |
| Seniors in Action (3e) | 118 | 0.26 | +0.07 | 0 | ±0 |
| Canaries Now–Communist Party of the Canarian People (ANC–UP–PCPC) | 93 | 0.20 | New | 0 | ±0 |
| Blank ballots | 733 | 1.59 | +0.71 | | |
| **Total** | **46,053** | | | **27** | **±0** |
| Valid votes | 46,053 | 98.49 | −0.46 | | |
| Invalid votes | 704 | 1.51 | +0.46 | | |
| **Votes cast / turnout** | **46,757** | **54.59** | **+0.35** | | |
| Abstentions | 38,901 | 45.41 | −0.35 | | |
| **Registered voters** | **85,658** | | | | |
Sources
Footnotes: ^{1} Canarian Coalition results are compared to Canarian Coalition–United for Gran Canaria totals in the 2019 election.

== See also ==
- 2023 Canarian regional election
