= 2019 Spanish local elections in the Canary Islands =

This article presents the results breakdown of the local elections held in the Canary Islands on 26 May 2019. The following tables show detailed results in the autonomous community's most populous municipalities, sorted alphabetically.

== City control ==
The following table lists party control in the most populous municipalities, including provincial capitals (shown in bold). Gains for a party are displayed with the cell's background shaded in that party's colour.

Municipality	Population	Previous control	New control
Arona	79,448	Spanish Socialist Workers' Party (PSOE)	Spanish Socialist Workers' Party (PSOE)
**Las Palmas de Gran Canaria**	378,517	Spanish Socialist Workers' Party (PSOE)	Spanish Socialist Workers' Party (PSOE)
San Cristóbal de La Laguna	155,549	Canarian Coalition–Canarian Nationalist Party (CCa–PNC)	Spanish Socialist Workers' Party (PSOE)
**Santa Cruz de Tenerife**	204,856	Canarian Coalition–Canarian Nationalist Party (CCa–PNC)	Spanish Socialist Workers' Party (PSOE) (CCa–PNC in 2020)
Telde	102,424	New Canaries (NCa)	Canarian Coalition–United for Gran Canaria (CC–UxGC) (NCa in 2021)

== Municipalities ==
=== Arona ===
Population: 79,448

← Summary of the 26 May 2019 City Council of Arona election results →
Parties and alliances	Popular vote			Seats	
Parties and alliances	Votes	%	±pp	Total	+/−
Spanish Socialist Workers' Party (PSOE)	9,508	47.83	+12.55	**14**	+2
Canarian Coalition (CCa)	3,006	15.12	+0.95	**4**	−1
People's Party (PP)	2,644	13.30	−2.29	**3**	−2
Citizens for Arona (CxArona)	1,353	6.81	−2.39	**2**	−1
Yes We Can Arona (SSP–Podemos)^{1}	1,306	6.57	−3.31	**1**	+1
Citizens–Party of the Citizenry (Cs)	1,037	5.22	+1.43	**1**	+1
United Left (IU)^{2}	267	1.34	−1.14	0	±0
ARAB Europeans for the Canaries (AREPC)	237	1.19	New	0	±0
Movement of the People (MDP)	193	0.97	New	0	±0
Canaries Now (ANC–UP)^{3}	171	0.86	−0.29	0	±0
Blank ballots	158	0.79	−0.52		
**Total**	**19,880**			**25**	**±0**
Valid votes	19,880	99.29	+0.38		
Invalid votes	143	0.71	−0.38		
**Votes cast / turnout**	**20,023**	**37.91**	**−3.44**		
Abstentions	32,798	62.09	+3.44		
**Registered voters**	**52,821**				
Sources
Footnotes: ^{1} Yes We Can Arona results are compared to the combined totals of United with Arona and Yes We Can in the 2015 election.; ^{2} United Left results are compared to Canaries Decides totals in the 2015 election.; ^{3} Canaries Now results are compared to Canarian Nationalist Alternative totals in the 2015 election.

=== Las Palmas de Gran Canaria ===
Population: 378,517

← Summary of the 26 May 2019 City Council of Las Palmas de Gran Canaria election results →
Parties and alliances	Popular vote			Seats	
Parties and alliances	Votes	%	±pp	Total	+/−
Spanish Socialist Workers' Party (PSOE)	48,480	31.73	+11.99	**11**	+4
People's Party (PP)	33,921	22.20	−6.56	**7**	−3
United We Can–United Left–Equo (Podemos–IU–Equo)^{1}	15,881	10.39	−9.24	**3**	−3
Citizens–Party of the Citizenry (Cs)	14,527	9.51	+1.80	**3**	+1
New Canaries–Broad Front (NC–FA)	14,521	9.50	+2.01	**3**	+1
Canarian Coalition–United for Gran Canaria (CC–UxGC)^{2}	12,812	8.38	−0.36	**2**	±0
Vox (Vox)	4,831	3.16	+2.75	0	±0
Animalist Party Against Mistreatment of Animals (PACMA)	2,014	1.32	New	0	±0
The Greens–Green Group (LV–GV)	1,456	0.95	New	0	±0
Citizens for Canarian Change (CIUCA)	655	0.43	New	0	±0
Communist Party of the Canarian People (PCPC)	554	0.36	New	0	±0
Canaries Now (ANC–UP)^{3}	531	0.35	+0.03	0	±0
For a Fairer World (PUM+J)	442	0.29	−0.30	0	±0
Seniors in Action (3e en acción)	230	0.15	New	0	±0
Vote For Yourself (Vótate)	189	0.12	New	0	±0
Humanist Party (PH)	165	0.11	New	0	±0
Blank ballots	1,600	1.05	−0.66		
**Total**	**152,809**			**29**	**±0**
Valid votes	152,809	99.22	+0.59		
Invalid votes	1,198	0.78	−0.59		
**Votes cast / turnout**	**154,007**	**50.71**	**−6.25**		
Abstentions	149,705	49.29	+6.25		
**Registered voters**	**303,712**				
Sources
Footnotes: ^{1} United We Can–United Left–Equo results are compared to the combined totals of Las Palmas de Gran Canaria Can and Canaries Decides in the 2015 election.; ^{2} Canarian Coalition–United for Gran Canaria results are compared to the combined totals of United for Gran Canaria and Canarian Coalition–Canarian Nationalist Party in the 2015 election.; ^{3} Canaries Now results are compared to Canarian Nationalist Alternative totals in the 2015 election.

=== San Cristóbal de La Laguna ===
Population: 155,549

← Summary of the 26 May 2019 City Council of San Cristóbal de La Laguna election results →
Parties and alliances	Popular vote			Seats	
Parties and alliances	Votes	%	±pp	Total	+/−
Canarian Coalition–Canarian Nationalist Party (CCa–PNC)	19,201	27.65	+3.71	**9**	+2
Spanish Socialist Workers' Party (PSOE)	16,603	23.91	+5.82	**7**	+2
United We Can (Podemos–SSP–IU–Equo)^{1}	11,794	16.98	−1.53	**5**	−1
La Laguna Ahead (Avante La Laguna)	6,136	8.84	New	**2**	+2
People's Party (PP)	5,411	7.79	−7.39	**2**	−2
Citizens–Party of the Citizenry (Cs)	4,930	7.10	−0.07	**2**	±0
Vox (Vox)	1,590	2.29	New	0	±0
New Canaries–Broad Front (NC–FA)	1,563	2.25	−7.34	0	−3
Nivaria (Nivaria)	916	1.32	New	0	±0
Canaries Now (ANC–UP)^{2}	312	0.45	−0.77	0	±0
Seniors in Action (3e en acción)	181	0.26	New	0	±0
ARAB Europeans for the Canaries (AREPC)	91	0.13	New	0	±0
Blank ballots	718	1.03	−0.98		
**Total**	**69,446**			**27**	**±0**
Valid votes	69,446	99.03	+0.82		
Invalid votes	677	0.97	−0.82		
**Votes cast / turnout**	**70,123**	**55.58**	**−2.52**		
Abstentions	56,039	44.42	+2.52		
**Registered voters**	**126,162**				
Sources
Footnotes: ^{1} United We Can–United Left–Equo results are compared to United We Can totals in the 2015 election.; ^{2} Canaries Now results are compared to Canarian Nationalist Alternative totals in the 2015 election.

=== Santa Cruz de Tenerife ===
Population: 204,856

← Summary of the 26 May 2019 City Council of Santa Cruz de Tenerife election results →
Parties and alliances	Popular vote			Seats	
Parties and alliances	Votes	%	±pp	Total	+/−
Canarian Coalition–Canarian Nationalist Party (CCa–PNC)	27,073	30.84	+6.58	**10**	+1
Spanish Socialist Workers' Party (PSOE)	23,143	26.36	+13.12	**9**	+5
United We Can–United Left–Equo (Podemos–IUC–Equo)^{1}	9,300	10.59	+3.05	**3**	+2
People's Party (PP)	8,481	9.66	−7.81	**3**	−3
Citizens–Party of the Citizenry (Cs)	7,337	8.36	−1.12	**2**	−1
Yes We Can (SSP)	3,864	4.40	−7.68	0	−4
Vox (Vox)	2,736	3.12	+2.67	0	±0
New Canaries–Broad Front (NC–FA)	1,489	1.70	−0.11	0	±0
Animalist Party Against Mistreatment of Animals (PACMA)	1,389	1.58	−0.88	0	±0
Santa Cruz Common Sense (SCSC)	852	0.97	−0.50	0	±0
The Greens–Green Group (LV–GV)	609	0.69	New	0	±0
Canaries Now (ANC–UP)^{2}	343	0.39	−1.50	0	±0
Seniors in Action (3e en acción)	159	0.18	New	0	±0
For a Fairer World (PUM+J)	120	0.14	−0.32	0	±0
Communist Party of the Canarian People (PCPC)	111	0.13	−0.21	0	±0
With You, We Are Democracy (Contigo)	85	0.10	New	0	±0
Blank ballots	697	0.79	−0.92		
**Total**	**87,788**			**27**	**±0**
Valid votes	87,788	99.42	+0.79		
Invalid votes	508	0.58	−0.79		
**Votes cast / turnout**	**88,296**	**53.40**	**−1.66**		
Abstentions	77,051	46.60	+1.66		
**Registered voters**	**165,347**				
Sources
Footnotes: ^{1} United We Can–United Left–Equo results are compared to the combined totals of Canaries Decides and Santa Cruz Now in the 2015 election.; ^{2} Canaries Now results are compared to Canarian Nationalist Alternative totals in the 2015 election.

=== Telde ===
Population: 102,424

← Summary of the 26 May 2019 City Council of Telde election results →
Parties and alliances	Popular vote			Seats	
Parties and alliances	Votes	%	±pp	Total	+/−
New Canaries–Broad Front (NC–FA)	10,841	24.28	+3.60	**8**	+1
Spanish Socialist Workers' Party (PSOE)	9,022	20.20	+8.65	**6**	+2
Canarian Coalition–United for Gran Canaria (CC–UxGC)^{1}	5,454	12.21	−13.93	**4**	−3
Citizens for Canarian Change (CIUCA)	4,656	10.43	New	**3**	+3
People's Party (PP)	3,232	7.24	−1.49	**2**	−1
More for Telde (+xT)	3,176	7.11	−6.40	**2**	−2
United We Can–United Left–Equo (Podemos–IU–Equo)^{2}	3,028	6.78	−3.68	**2**	±0
Citizens–Party of the Citizenry (Cs)	1,822	4.08	+0.50	0	±0
Canarian Centrist Group (GCC)	1,453	3.25	New	0	±0
Vox (Vox)	903	2.02	New	0	±0
Roque de Gando (RDG)	460	1.03	+0.05	0	±0
With You, We Are Democracy (Contigo)	133	0.30	New	0	±0
Seniors in Action (3e en acción)	83	0.19	New	0	±0
Blank ballots	393	0.88	−0.59		
**Total**	**44,656**			**27**	**±0**
Valid votes	44,656	98.95	+0.46		
Invalid votes	472	1.05	−0.46		
**Votes cast / turnout**	**45,128**	**54.24**	**−7.70**		
Abstentions	38,067	45.76	+7.70		
**Registered voters**	**83,195**				
Sources
Footnotes: ^{1} Canarian Coalition–United for Gran Canaria results are compared to the combined totals of United for Gran Canaria, Canarian Coalition–Canarian Nationalist Party and Citizens of Democratic Centre in the 2015 election.; ^{2} United We Can–United Left–Equo results are compared to the combined totals of We Can Win Telde and Canaries Decides in the 2015 election.

== See also ==
- 2019 Canarian regional election
