= 2015 Spanish local elections in the Canary Islands =

This article presents the results breakdown of the local elections held in the Canary Islands on 24 May 2015. The following tables show detailed results in the autonomous community's most populous municipalities, sorted alphabetically.

== City control ==
The following table lists party control in the most populous municipalities, including provincial capitals (shown in bold). Gains for a party are displayed with the cell's background shaded in that party's colour.

Municipality	Population	Previous control	New control
Arona	79,890	Canarian Coalition–Canarian Nationalist Party (CCa–PNC)	Spanish Socialist Workers' Party (PSOE)
**Las Palmas de Gran Canaria**	382,283	People's Party (PP)	Spanish Socialist Workers' Party (PSOE)
San Cristóbal de La Laguna	153,009	Canarian Coalition–Canarian Nationalist Party (CCa–PNC)	Canarian Coalition–Canarian Nationalist Party (CCa–PNC)
**Santa Cruz de Tenerife**	205,279	Canarian Coalition–Canarian Nationalist Party (CCa–PNC)	Canarian Coalition–Canarian Nationalist Party (CCa–PNC)
Telde	102,076	People's Party (PP)	New Canaries (NCa)

== Municipalities ==
=== Arona ===
Population: 79,890

← Summary of the 24 May 2015 City Council of Arona election results →
Parties and alliances	Popular vote			Seats	
Parties and alliances	Votes	%	±pp	Total	+/−
Spanish Socialist Workers' Party (PSOE)	6,806	35.28	+16.55	**12**	+7
People's Party (PP)	3,008	15.59	−0.15	**5**	+1
Canarian Coalition–Canarian Nationalist Party (CCa–PNC)	2,734	14.17	−28.87	**5**	−8
Citizens for Arona (CxArona)	1,774	9.20	+3.27	**3**	+2
United with Arona (Unidos con Arona)	954	4.95	New	0	±0
Yes We Can (SSP)	951	4.93	+2.13	0	±0
Nationalist Canarian Centre (CCN)	927	4.81	New	0	±0
Citizens–Party of the Citizenry (C's)	732	3.79	New	0	±0
Canaries Decides (IUC–LV–UP–ALTER)^{1}	479	2.48	−0.82	0	±0
Let's Win (Ganemos)	355	1.84	New	0	±0
Canarian Nationalist Alternative (ANC)	222	1.15	−0.15	0	±0
Union, Progress and Democracy (UPyD)	97	0.50	New	0	±0
Centre of Arona (CAN)	n/a	n/a	−7.36	0	−2
Blank ballots	253	1.31	−0.48		
**Total**	**19,292**			**25**	**±0**
Valid votes	19,292	98.91	+0.22		
Invalid votes	213	1.09	−0.22		
**Votes cast / turnout**	**19,505**	**41.35**	**−7.15**		
Abstentions	27,666	58.65	+7.15		
**Registered voters**	**47,171**				
Sources
Footnotes: ^{1} Canaries Decides results are compared to the combined totals of United Left–The Greens–Socialists for Tenerife and The Greens in the 2011 election.

=== Las Palmas de Gran Canaria ===
Population: 382,283

← Summary of the 24 May 2015 City Council of Las Palmas de Gran Canaria election results →
Parties and alliances	Popular vote			Seats	
Parties and alliances	Votes	%	±pp	Total	+/−
People's Party (PP)	48,543	28.76	−14.45	**10**	−6
Spanish Socialist Workers' Party (PSOE)	33,312	19.74	−3.31	**7**	−2
Las Palmas de Gran Canaria Can (LPGC Puede)	27,243	16.14	New	**6**	+6
Citizens–Party of the Citizenry (C's)	13,019	7.71	New	**2**	+2
New Canaries–Broad Front (NC–FA)	12,635	7.49	+1.37	**2**	±0
United for Gran Canaria (UxGC)^{1}	9,381	5.56	−1.75	**2**	±0
Canaries Decides (IUC–LV–UP–ALTER)^{2}	5,889	3.49	−1.97	0	±0
Canarian Coalition–Canarian Nationalist Party (CCa–PNC)	5,372	3.18	−1.67	0	±0
Canarian Green Party (PVerde)	4,203	2.49	New	0	±0
Union, Progress and Democracy (UPyD)	2,325	1.38	−0.27	0	±0
Citizens of Democratic Centre (CCD)	1,533	0.91	New	0	±0
For a Fairer World (PUM+J)	998	0.59	+0.33	0	±0
Vox (Vox)	689	0.41	New	0	±0
Canarian Nationalist Alternative (ANC)	542	0.32	−0.20	0	±0
Internationalist Solidarity and Self-Management (SAIn)	205	0.12	New	0	±0
Blank ballots	2,889	1.71	−1.85		
**Total**	**168,778**			**29**	**±0**
Valid votes	168,778	98.63	+2.01		
Invalid votes	2,339	1.37	−2.01		
**Votes cast / turnout**	**171,117**	**56.96**	**+0.85**		
Abstentions	129,288	43.04	−0.85		
**Registered voters**	**300,405**				
Sources
Footnotes: ^{1} United for Gran Canaria results are compared to the combined totals of Commitment to Gran Canaria and Citizens for Canarian Change in the 2011 election.; ^{2} Canaries Decides results are compared to the combined totals of The Greens, Canarian United Left and Unity of the People in the 2011 election.

=== San Cristóbal de La Laguna ===
Population: 153,009

← Summary of the 24 May 2015 City Council of San Cristóbal de La Laguna election results →
Parties and alliances	Popular vote			Seats	
Parties and alliances	Votes	%	±pp	Total	+/−
Canarian Coalition–Canarian Nationalist Party (CCa–PNC)	16,670	23.94	−15.83	**7**	−6
United We Can (Unid@s Se Puede)^{1}	12,889	18.51	+3.70	**6**	+2
Spanish Socialist Workers' Party (PSOE)	12,592	18.09	+3.00	**5**	+1
People's Party (PP)	10,569	15.18	−5.40	**4**	−2
For Tenerife–New Canaries (XTF–NC)	6,678	9.59	New	**3**	+3
Citizens–Party of the Citizenry (C's)	4,993	7.17	New	**2**	+2
Union, Progress and Democracy (UPyD)	1,247	1.79	+0.73	0	±0
Canarian Nationalist Alternative (ANC)	846	1.22	−0.22	0	±0
Participatory Democracy (Participa)	649	0.93	New	0	±0
Nationalist Canarian Centre (CCN)	591	0.85	New	0	±0
Movement for the Unity of the Canarian People (MUPC)	493	0.71	+0.45	0	±0
Blank ballots	1,401	2.01	−0.27		
**Total**	**69,618**			**27**	**±0**
Valid votes	69,618	98.21	+0.93		
Invalid votes	1,272	1.79	−0.93		
**Votes cast / turnout**	**70,890**	**58.10**	**−0.89**		
Abstentions	51,134	41.90	+0.89		
**Registered voters**	**122,024**				
Sources
Footnotes: ^{1} United We Can results are compared to the combined totals of United Left–The Greens–Socialists for Tenerife and Yes We Can for Tenerife Alternative in the 2011 election.

=== Santa Cruz de Tenerife ===
Population: 205,279

← Summary of the 24 May 2015 City Council of Santa Cruz de Tenerife election results →
Parties and alliances	Popular vote			Seats	
Parties and alliances	Votes	%	±pp	Total	+/−
Canarian Coalition–Canarian Nationalist Party (CCa–PNC)	21,485	24.26	−3.11	**9**	±0
People's Party (PP)	15,470	17.47	−10.89	**6**	−3
Spanish Socialist Workers' Party (PSOE)	11,720	13.24	−2.35	**4**	−1
Yes We Can (SSP)	10,694	12.08	+4.58	**4**	+2
Citizens–Party of the Citizenry (C's)	8,395	9.48	New	**3**	+3
Canaries Decides (IUC–LV–UP–ALTER)^{1}	4,513	5.10	−3.28	**1**	±0
Animalist Party Against Mistreatment of Animals (PACMA)	2,178	2.46	New	0	±0
Santa Cruz Now (Ahora SC)	2,160	2.44	New	0	±0
Canarian Nationalist Alternative (ANC)	1,673	1.89	+0.26	0	±0
For Tenerife–New Canaries–Broad Front (XTF–NC)	1,604	1.81	New	0	±0
Nationalist Canarian Centre (CCN)	1,601	1.81	New	0	±0
Santa Cruz Common Sense (SCSC)	1,306	1.47	New	0	±0
Socialists for Tenerife–Greens (SxTF–Verdes)	1,122	1.27	New	0	±0
Union, Progress and Democracy (UPyD)	1,042	1.18	−0.15	0	±0
Participatory Democracy Santa Cruz (Participa)	955	1.08	New	0	±0
For a Fairer World (PUM+J)	408	0.46	+0.03	0	±0
Vox (Vox)	402	0.45	New	0	±0
Communist Party of the Canarian People (PCPC)	300	0.34	−0.09	0	±0
Citizens of Santa Cruz (CSC)	n/a	n/a	−5.39	0	−1
Blank ballots	1,518	1.71	−0.87		
**Total**	**88,546**			**27**	**±0**
Valid votes	88,546	98.63	+1.14		
Invalid votes	1,233	1.37	−1.14		
**Votes cast / turnout**	**89,779**	**55.06**	**−1.52**		
Abstentions	73,266	44.94	+1.52		
**Registered voters**	**163,045**				
Sources
Footnotes: ^{1} Canaries Decides results are compared to the combined totals of United Left–The Greens–Socialists for Tenerife and The Greens in the 2011 election.

=== Telde ===
Population: 102,076

← Summary of the 24 May 2015 City Council of Telde election results →
Parties and alliances	Popular vote			Seats	
Parties and alliances	Votes	%	±pp	Total	+/−
New Canaries–Broad Front (NC–FA)	10,208	20.68	−6.97	**7**	−2
More for Telde (+xT)	6,671	13.51	+5.55	**4**	+2
United for Gran Canaria (UxGC)^{1}	6,220	12.60	−1.41	**4**	±0
Spanish Socialist Workers' Party (PSOE)	5,701	11.55	+2.63	**4**	+2
People's Party (PP)	4,308	8.73	−17.66	**3**	−5
Canarian Coalition–Canarian Nationalist Party (CCa–PNC)	4,053	8.21	+1.99	**2**	±0
We Can Win Telde (SPGT)	3,621	7.33	New	**2**	+2
Citizens of Democratic Centre (CCD)	2,629	5.33	New	**1**	+1
Citizens–Party of the Citizenry (C's)	1,766	3.58	New	0	±0
Canaries Decides (IUC–LV–UP–ALTER)^{2}	1,545	3.13	−0.96	0	±0
Let's Win Telde (Ganemos)	940	1.90	New	0	±0
Roque de Gando (RDG)	482	0.98	New	0	±0
Union, Progress and Democracy (UPyD)	341	0.69	−0.35	0	±0
Canarian Convergence Party (PACC)	156	0.32	New	0	±0
Blank ballots	726	1.47	−1.44		
**Total**	**49,367**			**27**	**±0**
Valid votes	49,367	98.49	+1.29		
Invalid votes	757	1.51	−1.29		
**Votes cast / turnout**	**50,124**	**61.94**	**+0.62**		
Abstentions	30,796	38.06	−0.62		
**Registered voters**	**80,920**				
Sources
Footnotes: ^{1} United for Gran Canaria results are compared to the combined totals of Citizens for Canarian Change and Commitment to Gran Canaria in the 2011 election.; ^{2} Canaries Decides results are compared to the combined totals of The Greens and Canarian United Left in the 2011 election.

== See also ==
- 2015 Canarian regional election
