= 2011 Spanish local elections in the Canary Islands =

This article presents the results breakdown of the local elections held in the Canary Islands on 22 May 2011. The following tables show detailed results in the autonomous community's most populous municipalities, sorted alphabetically.

== City control ==
The following table lists party control in the most populous municipalities, including provincial capitals (shown in bold). Gains for a party are displayed with the cell's background shaded in that party's colour.

Municipality	Population	Previous control	New control
Arona	79,377	Canarian Coalition–Canarian Nationalist Party (CC–PNC)	Canarian Coalition–Canarian Nationalist Party (CC–PNC)
**Las Palmas de Gran Canaria**	383,308	Spanish Socialist Workers' Party (PSOE)	People's Party (PP)
San Cristóbal de La Laguna	152,222	Canarian Coalition–Canarian Nationalist Party (CC–PNC)	Canarian Coalition–Canarian Nationalist Party (CC–PNC)
**Santa Cruz de Tenerife**	222,643	Canarian Coalition–Canarian Nationalist Party (CC–PNC)	Canarian Coalition–Canarian Nationalist Party (CC–PNC)
Telde	100,900	New Canaries (NCa)	People's Party (PP)

== Municipalities ==
=== Arona ===
Population: 79,377

← Summary of the 22 May 2011 City Council of Arona election results →
Parties and alliances	Popular vote			Seats	
Parties and alliances	Votes	%	±pp	Total	+/−
Canarian Coalition–Nationalist Party–Canarian Centre (CC–PNC–CCN)	8,143	43.04	−1.38	**13**	±0
Spanish Socialist Workers' Party (PSOE)	3,543	18.73	−2.82	**5**	−1
People's Party (PP)	2,978	15.74	+0.60	**4**	±0
Centre of Arona (CAN)	1,393	7.36	−2.20	**2**	±0
Citizens for Arona (CxArona)	1,122	5.93	New	**1**	+1
Yes We Can for Tenerife Alternative (ASSPPT)	530	2.80	New	0	±0
United Left–The Greens–Socialists for Tenerife (IU–LV–SxTF)^{1}	353	1.87	−2.09	0	±0
The Greens (Verdes)	271	1.43	New	0	±0
Canarian Nationalist Alternative (ANC)	246	1.30	New	0	±0
Blank ballots	339	1.79	+0.80		
**Total**	**18,918**			**25**	**±0**
Valid votes	18,918	98.69	−0.60		
Invalid votes	251	1.31	+0.60		
**Votes cast / turnout**	**19,169**	**48.50**	**−0.11**		
Abstentions	20,351	51.50	+0.11		
**Registered voters**	**39,520**				
Sources
Footnotes: ^{1} United Left–The Greens–Socialists for Tenerife results are compared to The Greens–Green Group totals in the 2007 election.

=== Las Palmas de Gran Canaria ===
Population: 383,308

← Summary of the 22 May 2011 City Council of Las Palmas de Gran Canaria election results →
Parties and alliances	Popular vote			Seats	
Parties and alliances	Votes	%	±pp	Total	+/−
People's Party (PP)	68,641	43.21	+6.95	**16**	+4
Spanish Socialist Workers' Party (PSOE)	36,615	23.05	−18.85	**9**	−6
Commitment to Gran Canaria (CGCa)	11,096	6.98	+0.89	**2**	±0
New Canaries–New Gran Canaria (NCa)	9,729	6.12	+1.58	**2**	+2
Canarian Coalition–Nationalist Party–Canarian Centre (CC–PNC–CCN)^{1}	7,708	4.85	+0.46	0	±0
The Greens (Verdes)	5,397	3.40	+0.54	0	±0
Canarian United Left (IUC)	2,963	1.87	+1.25	0	±0
Union, Progress and Democracy (UPyD)	2,626	1.65	New	0	±0
Common Sense in the Canaries (SCC)	2,221	1.40	New	0	±0
Yes We Can Citizens' Alternative (ACSSP)^{2}	1,522	0.96	+0.81	0	±0
United Neighbours (VU)	957	0.60	+0.29	0	±0
Canarian Nationalist Alternative (ANC)	822	0.52	New	0	±0
Communist Party of the Canarian People (PCPC)	606	0.38	+0.16	0	±0
Citizens for Canarian Change (CIUCA)	517	0.33	New	0	±0
For a Fairer World (PUM+J)	408	0.26	New	0	±0
Humanist Party (PH)	351	0.22	+0.11	0	±0
Unity of the People (UP)	301	0.19	+0.01	0	±0
Liberal Democratic Centre (CDL)	291	0.18	New	0	±0
Centrist Democratic Liberals (LDC)	246	0.15	New	0	±0
National Democracy (DN)	187	0.12	New	0	±0
Blank ballots	5,651	3.56	+2.03		
**Total**	**158,855**			**29**	**±0**
Valid votes	158,855	96.62	−2.75		
Invalid votes	5,558	3.38	+2.75		
**Votes cast / turnout**	**164,413**	**56.11**	**−0.73**		
Abstentions	128,593	43.89	+0.73		
**Registered voters**	**293,006**				
Sources
Footnotes: ^{1} Canarian Coalition–Nationalist Party–Canarian Centre results are compared to the combined totals of Canarian Coalition–Canarian Nationalist Party and Canarian Centre in the 2007 election.; ^{2} Yes We Can Citizens' Alternative results are compared to Canarian Popular Alternative totals in the 2007 election.

=== San Cristóbal de La Laguna ===
Population: 152,222

← Summary of the 22 May 2011 City Council of San Cristóbal de La Laguna election results →
Parties and alliances	Popular vote			Seats	
Parties and alliances	Votes	%	±pp	Total	+/−
Canarian Coalition–Nationalist Party–Canarian Centre (CC–PNC–CCN)^{1}	26,976	39.77	−11.12	**13**	−2
People's Party (PP)	13,960	20.58	+9.72	**6**	+3
Spanish Socialist Workers' Party (PSOE)	10,233	15.09	−12.33	**4**	−5
United Left–The Greens–Socialists for Tenerife (IU–LV–SxTF)	6,144	9.06	+6.06	**3**	+3
Yes We Can for Tenerife Alternative (ASSPPT)	3,900	5.75	+1.90	**1**	+1
The Greens (Verdes)	1,436	2.12	New	0	±0
Canarian Nationalist Alternative (ANC)	978	1.44	+0.63	0	±0
Group for La Laguna (AxLL)	921	1.36	New	0	±0
Union, Progress and Democracy (UPyD)	703	1.04	New	0	±0
Independent Democratic Citizen Alternative (ACDI)	334	0.49	−0.15	0	±0
Humanist Party (PH)	197	0.29	+0.09	0	±0
Movement for the Unity of the Canarian People (MUPC)	173	0.26	New	0	±0
Independent Centre of the Canaries (CICAN)	137	0.20	New	0	±0
Liberal Democratic Centre (CDL)	127	0.19	New	0	±0
Canarian Social Democratic Centre (CSDC)	60	0.09	New	0	±0
Blank ballots	1,545	2.28	+0.74		
**Total**	**67,824**			**27**	**±0**
Valid votes	67,824	97.28	−2.08		
Invalid votes	1,898	2.72	+2.08		
**Votes cast / turnout**	**69,722**	**58.99**	**+1.30**		
Abstentions	48,464	41.01	−1.30		
**Registered voters**	**118,186**				
Sources
Footnotes: ^{1} Canarian Coalition–Nationalist Party–Canarian Centre results are compared to the combined totals of Canarian Coalition–Canarian Nationalist Party and Canarian Centre in the 2007 election.

=== Santa Cruz de Tenerife ===
Population: 222,643

← Summary of the 22 May 2011 City Council of Santa Cruz de Tenerife election results →
Parties and alliances	Popular vote			Seats	
Parties and alliances	Votes	%	±pp	Total	+/−
People's Party (PP)	25,407	28.36	+9.48	**9**	+3
Canarian Coalition–Nationalist Party–Canarian Centre (CC–PNC–CCN)^{1}	24,523	27.37	−13.16	**9**	−3
Spanish Socialist Workers' Party (PSOE)	13,965	15.59	−8.49	**5**	−2
Yes We Can for Tenerife Alternative (ASSPPT)	6,717	7.50	+5.04	**2**	+2
United Left–The Greens–Socialists for Tenerife (IU–LV–SxTF)	5,208	5.81	+3.45	**1**	+1
Citizens of Santa Cruz (CSC)	4,826	5.39	−1.66	**1**	−1
The Greens (Verdes)	2,302	2.57	New	0	±0
Canarian Nationalist Alternative (ANC)	1,457	1.63	+0.99	0	±0
Union, Progress and Democracy (UPyD)	1,379	1.54	New	0	±0
Independent Centre of the Canaries (CICAN)	442	0.49	New	0	±0
Communist Party of the Canarian People (PCPC)	387	0.43	+0.25	0	±0
For a Fairer World (PUM+J)	387	0.43	New	0	±0
Canarian Social Democratic Centre (CSDC)	157	0.18	New	0	±0
National Democracy (DN)	124	0.14	New	0	±0
Blank ballots	2,315	2.58	+0.73		
**Total**	**89,596**			**27**	**±0**
Valid votes	89,596	97.49	−2.01		
Invalid votes	2,308	2.51	+2.01		
**Votes cast / turnout**	**91,904**	**56.58**	**+6.36**		
Abstentions	70,517	43.42	−6.36		
**Registered voters**	**162,421**				
Sources
Footnotes: ^{1} Canarian Coalition–Nationalist Party–Canarian Centre results are compared to the combined totals of Canarian Coalition–Canarian Nationalist Party and Canarian Centre in the 2007 election.

=== Telde ===
Population: 100,900

← Summary of the 22 May 2011 City Council of Telde election results →
Parties and alliances	Popular vote			Seats	
Parties and alliances	Votes	%	±pp	Total	+/−
New Canaries–Nationalist Canarian Centre (NC–CCN)^{1}	12,986	27.65	−9.15	**9**	−1
People's Party (PP)	12,392	26.39	+4.83	**8**	+1
Citizens for Canarian Change (CIUCA)	5,830	12.41	+2.03	**4**	+1
Spanish Socialist Workers' Party (PSOE)	4,189	8.92	−7.89	**2**	−3
More for Telde (+xT)	3,738	7.96	New	**2**	+2
Canarian Coalition–Nationalist Party (CC–PNC)	2,922	6.22	+1.52	**2**	+2
The Greens (Verdes)	1,193	2.54	+0.22	0	±0
Commitment to Gran Canaria (CGCa)	751	1.60	+0.98	0	±0
Canarian United Left (IUC)	729	1.55	−0.57	0	±0
Union, Progress and Democracy (UPyD)	487	1.04	New	0	±0
Canarian Nationalist Alternative (ANC)	245	0.52	New	0	±0
Communist Party of the Canarian People (PCPC)	137	0.29	New	0	±0
Blank ballots	1,367	2.91	+1.32		
**Total**	**46,966**			**27**	**+2**
Valid votes	46,966	97.20	−2.21		
Invalid votes	1,354	2.80	+2.21		
**Votes cast / turnout**	**48,320**	**61.32**	**−1.72**		
Abstentions	30,482	38.68	+1.72		
**Registered voters**	**78,802**				
Sources
Footnotes: ^{1} New Canaries–Nationalist Canarian Centre results are compared to the combined totals of New Canaries–New Gran Canaria and Canarian Centre in the 2007 election.

== See also ==
- 2011 Canarian regional election
